= 1972–73 Borussia Mönchengladbach season =

Borussia Mönchengladbach
1972–73 season
- Manager: Hennes Weisweiler
- Bundesliga: 5th
- DFB-Pokal: Champion
- UEFA Cup: Runners-up
- Top goalscorer: League: Jupp Heynckes (30 goals); All: Jupp Heynckes (40 goals)
Home colours	Away colours

The 1973–74 Borussia Mönchengladbach season was the 73rd season in the club's history.

== Season overview ==
Despite only achieving 5th place in the 1972–73 Bundesliga, they would qualify for the 1973–74 European Cup Winners' Cup. Conversely, they would have better success in other tournaments winnin the 1972–73 DFB-Pokal and reaching runners-up in the 1972–73 UEFA Cup, losing to Liverpool. This season also saw the signing of Shmuel Rosenthal who was the first Israeli player to play for a European club.

== Squad ==
Note: Flags indicate national team as defined under FIFA eligibility rules; some limited exceptions apply. Players may hold more than one non-FIFA nationality.

No.	Pos.	Nation	Player
—	GK	GER	Wolfgang Kleff
—	GK	GER	Gregor Quasten
—	GK	GER	Bernd Schrage
—	DF	GER	Berti Vogts
—	DF	GER	Klaus-Dieter Sieloff
—	DF	GER	Rainer Bonhof
—	DF	GER	Hans-Jürgen Wittkamp
—	DF	GER	Ulrich Surau
—	DF	GER	Hartwig Bleidick
—	MF	GER	Dietmar Danner
—	MF	GER	Herbert Wimmer
—	MF	GER	Uli Stielike

No.	Pos.	Nation	Player
—	MF	GER	Christian Kulik
—	MF	ISR	Shmuel Rosenthal
—	MF	GER	Hans Klinkhammer
—	MF	GER	Heinz Michallik
—	MF	GER	Rainer Malzkorn
—	FW	GER	Jupp Heynckes
—	FW	DEN	Henning Jensen
—	FW	GER	Bernd Rupp
—	FW	GER	Günter Netzer
—	FW	DEN	Allan Simonsen
—	FW	GER	Robert Fahrig
—	FW	GER	Siegfried Zoppke

== Match results ==
=== Legend ===
Win Draw Loss

=== Bundesliga ===
16 September 1972 1	Borussia Mönchengladbach	4–3	MSV Duisburg	Bökelbergstadion, Mönchengladbach
15:30 CEST	Heynckes 20', 67'; Wimmer 63', 82'	Report	Wunder 26', 87'; Bella 89'	Attendance: 10,000; Referee: Heinz Quindeau (Ludwigshafen)

20 September 1972 2	Hamburger SV	1–3	Borussia Mönchengladbach	Volksparkstadion, Hamburg
20:00 CEST	Hönig 24'	Report	Heynckes 21'; Jensen 35', 68'	Attendance: 28,000; Referee: Heinz Quindeau (Ludwigshafen)

23 September 1972 3	Borussia Mönchengladbach	3–1	Hannover 96	Bökelbergstadion, Mönchengladbach
15:30 CEST	Heynckes 3' (pen.); Rosenthal 41'; Danner 88'	Report	Deterding 48'	Attendance: 18,000; Referee: Günter Linn (Altendiez)

30 September 1972 4	1. FC Kaiserslautern	3–1	Borussia Mönchengladbach	Bökelbergstadion, Mönchengladbach
15:30 CEST	Friedrich 52'; Vogt 60', 88'	Report	Bonhof 62'	Attendance: 22,000; Referee: Fritz Seiler (Schmiden)

4 October 1972 5	Borussia Mönchengladbach	2–3	Fortuna Düsseldorf	Betzenberg, Kaiserslautern
15:30 CEST	Heynckes 22'; Danner 74' (pen.)	Report	Geye 37'; Hesse 44'; Köhnen 61'	Attendance: 22,000; Referee: Heinz Aldinger (Waiblingen)

7 October 1972 6	VfL Bochum	3–0	Borussia Mönchengladbach	Stadion an der Castroper Straße, Bochum
19:30 CEST	Walitza 7'; Lameck 79'; Wosab 82'			Attendance: 32,000; Referee: Kurt Tschenscher (Mannheim)

11 October 1972 7	Borussia Mönchengladbach	3–2	Kickers Offenbach	Bökelbergstadion, Mönchengladbach
15:30 CEST	Wimmer 9'; Surau 15'; Heynckes 57'	Report	Schmitt 26'; Schäfer 28'	Attendance: 22,000; Referee: Heinz Aldinger (Waiblingen)

21 October 1972 8	Bayern Munich	3–0	Borussia Mönchengladbach	Olympiastadion, Munich
15:30 CEST	Müller 24', 48'; Hoeneß 66'	Report		Attendance: 74,000; Referee: Ferdinand Biwersi (Bliesransbach)

4 November 1972 9	Borussia Mönchengladbach	4–0	Eintracht Braunschweig	Bökelbergstadion, Mönchengladbach
14:30 CEST	Netzer 02'; Wimmer 16'; Danner 75'; Heynckes 81' (pen.)	Report		Attendance: 11,000; Referee: Dieter Berner (Enzberg)

11 October 1972 10	Borussia Mönchengladbach	3–2	Kickers Offenbach	Bökelbergstadion, Mönchengladbach
15:30 CEST	Wimmer 9'; Surau 15'; Heynckes 57'	Report	Schmitt 26'; Schäfer 28'	Attendance: 22,000; Referee: Heinz Aldinger (Waiblingen)

28 April 1973 29	Borussia Mönchengladbach	2–2	Hertha BSC	Bökelbergstadion, Mönchengladbach
15:30 CET	Vogts 47'; Heynckes 86'	Report	Horr 60'; Beer 81'	Attendance: 14,000; Referee: Alfons Betz (Regensburg)

11 November 1972 12	Hertha BSC	3–1	Borussia Mönchengladbach	Olympiastadion, Berlin
15:30 CET	Hermandung 16'; Sziedat 30'; Weiner 89'	Report	Surau 32'	Attendance: 52,000; Referee: Karl Riegg (Augsburg)

18 November 1972 13	Borussia Mönchengladbach	2–1	Wuppertaler SV	Bökelbergstadion, Mönchengladbach
15:30 CET	Danner 38'; Heynckes 67' (rig)	Report	Kohle 72' (pen.)	Attendance: 21,000; Referee: Walter Eschweiler (Euskirchen)

21 November 1972 14	FC Schalke 04	2–2	Borussia Mönchengladbach	Glückauf-Kampfbahn, Gelsenkirchen
20:00 CET	Lütkebohmert 7'; Kremers 36'	Report	Jensen 3'; Danner 55'	Attendance: 13,000; Referee: Rudolf Frickel (Munich)

25 November 1972 15	Eintracht Frankfurt	3–0	Borussia Mönchengladbach	Waldstadion, Frankfurt
15:30 CET	Grabowski 26' (rig); Hölzenbein 54'; Kliemann 77'	Report		Attendance: 16,000; Referee: Klaus Ohmsen (Hamburg)

2 December 1972 16	Borussia Mönchengladbach	5–2	1. FC Köln	Bökelbergstadion, Mönchengladbach
15:30 CET	Bonhof 1'; Rupp 16'; Heynckes 37', 56' (rig), 65' (rig)	Report	Flohe 52'; Simmet 74'	Attendance: 18,000; Referee: Kurt Tschenscher (Mannheim)

16 December 1972 17	VfB Stuttgart	3–0	Borussia Mönchengladbach	Neckarstadion, Stuttgart
15:30 CET	Lindner 5'; Ettmayer 53'; Frank 79'	Report		Attendance: 18,000; Referee: Herbert Lutz (Bremen)

20 January 1973 18	MSV Duisburg	2–2	Borussia Mönchengladbach	Wedaustadion, Duisburg
15:30 CET	Pirsig 32'; Lehmann 87'	Report	Bonhof 31', 36'	Attendance: 25,000; Referee: Günter Linn (Altendiez)

27 January 1973 19	Borussia Mönchengladbach	6–1	Hamburger SV	Bökelbergstadion, Mönchengladbach
15:30 CET	Rupp 23', 49'; Jensen 38'; Vogts 53'; Wittkamp 61'; Heynckes 79'	Report	34' Hönig	Attendance: 10,000; Referee: Max Klauser (Vaterstetten)

3 February 1973 20	Hannover 96	1–2	Borussia Mönchengladbach	Niedersachsenstadion, Hannover
15:30 CET	Reimann 84' (pen.)	Report	Heynckes 13', 82'	Attendance: 25,000; Referee: Ferdinand Biwersi (Bliesransbach)

10 February 1973 21	Borussia Mönchengladbach	6–2	1. FC Kaiserslautern	Bökelbergstadion, Mönchengladbach
15:30 CET	Bonhof 60'; Kulik 62'; Rupp 71', 75'; Wimmer 74'; Heynckes 83'	Report	Ackermann 73'; Bitz 78'	Attendance: 10,000; Referee: Karl-Heinz Picker (Hamburg)

17 February 1973 22	Fortuna Düsseldorf	1–3	Borussia Mönchengladbach	Rheinstadion, Düsseldorf
15:30 CET	Budde 39'	Report	Heynckes 15', 56'; Jensen 52'	Attendance: 45,000; Referee: Rudolf Frickel (Munich)

23 February 1973 23	Borussia Mönchengladbach	6–0	VfL Bochum	Bökelbergstadion, Mönchengladbach
20:00	Rupp 12'; Jensen 32'; Danner 54'; Heynckes 75'; Wittkamp 79'; Kulik 86'			Attendance: 10,000; Referee: Philipp Geng (Freiburg)

10 March 1973 24	Kickers Offenbach	2–1	Borussia Mönchengladbach	Stadion am Bieberer Berg, Offenbach am Main
15:30 CET	Hickersberger 12'; Schäfer 87'	Report	Surau 58'	Attendance: 32,000; Referee: Walter Horstmann (Groß Escherde)

17 March 1973 25	Borussia Mönchengladbach	0–3	Bayern Munich	Bökelbergstadion, Mönchengladbach
15:30 CET		Report	Hansen 28'; Krauthausen 37'; Zobel 63'	Attendance: 34,500; Referee: Klaus Ohmsen

24 March 1973 26	Rot-Weiß Oberhausen	1–3	Borussia Mönchengladbach	Niederrheinstadion, Oberhausen
15:30 CET	Hollmann 14'	Report	Jensen 11', 78'; Heynckes 85'	Attendance: 12,000; Referee: Gerhard Schulenburg (Hamburg)

31 March 1973 27	Borussia Mönchengladbach	3–1	SV Werder Bremen	Bökelbergstadion, Mönchengladbach
15:30 CET	Kulik 7'; Heynckes 30', 59'	Report	Weist 77'	Attendance: 14,000; Referee: Ferdinand Biwersi (Bliesransbach)

6 April 1973 28	Eintracht Braunschweig	0–0	Borussia Mönchengladbach	Stadion an der Hamburger Straße, Braunschweig
20:00 CET		Report		Attendance: 21,000; Referee: Heinz Aldinger (Waiblingen)

28 April 1973 29	Borussia Mönchengladbach	2–2	Hertha BSC	Bökelbergstadion, Mönchengladbach
15:30 CET	Vogts 47'; Heynckes 86'	Report	Horr 60'; Beer 81'	Attendance: 14,000; Referee: Alfons Betz (Regensburg)

5 May 1973 30	Wuppertaler SV	0–5	Borussia Mönchengladbach	Stadion am Zoo, Wuppertal
15:30 CET		Report	12' Rupp; 30', 50', 80' Heynckes; 47' Kulik	Attendance: 32,000; Referee: Paul Kindervater (Köln)

19 May 1973 31	Borussia Mönchengladbach	4–1	FC Schalke 04	Bökelbergstadion, Mönchengladbach
15:30 CET	Jensen 37', 50'; Rupp 65'; Netzer 90'	Report	Kremers 76'	Attendance: 16,000; Referee: Ferdinand Biwersi (Bliesransbach)

26 May 1973 32	Borussia Mönchengladbach	0–2	Eintracht Frankfurt	Bökelbergstadion, Mönchengladbach
15:30 CET		Report	Hölzenbein 64', 70'	Attendance: 9,000; Referee: Gert Meuser (Ingelheim)

2 June 1973 33	1. FC Köln	3–1	Borussia Mönchengladbach	Müngersdorfer Stadion, Cologne
15:30 CET	Kapellmann 40' (rig); Glowacz 47'; Flohe 84'	Report	Kulik 13'	Attendance: 15,000; Referee: Karl-Heinz Picker (Hamburg)

9 June 1973 34	Borussia Mönchengladbach	3–4	VfB Stuttgart	Bökelbergstadion, Mönchengladbach
15:30 CET	Heynckes 1', 14'; Netzer 53' (rig)	Report	Schwemmle 3'; Handschuh 17', 49'; Ettmayer 24'	Attendance: 8,000; Referee: Udo Zuchantke (Berlin)

=== DFB-Pokal ===
9 December 1972 First round - First leg	Freiburger FC	3–1	Borussia Mönchengladbach	Möslestadion, Freiburg im Breisgau
CET	Schnitzer 37'; Treuheit 77' de Fenn 86'	Report	Wittkamp 22'	Attendance: 20,000; Referee: Gert Meuser (Ingelheim)

20 December 1972 First round - Second leg	Borussia Mönchengladbach	7–1	Freiburger FC	Bökelbergstadion, Mönchengladbach
CET	Netzer 5', 38', 71' (rig); Heynckes 20', 55', 65'; Rupp 85'	Report	Matić 7'	Attendance: 10,000; Referee: Walter Engel (Reimsbach)

3 March 1973 Round of 16 - First round	FC Schalke 04	0–2	Borussia Mönchengladbach	Glückauf-Kampfbahn, Gelsenkirchen
CET		Report	Heynckes 22'; Kulik 64'	Attendance: 15,000; Referee: Rudolf Schröck (Riegelsberg)

14 March 1973 Round of 16 - Second leg	Borussia Mönchengladbach	1–1	FC Schalke 04	Bökelbergstadion, Mönchengladbach
CET	Bonhof 23'	Report	Manns 46'	Attendance: 20,000; Referee: Fritz Seiler (Schmiden)

14 April 1973 Quarter finals - first leg	Borussia Monchengladbach	2–1	1. FC Kaiserslautern	Bökelbergstadion, Mönchengladbach
CET	Danner 34', 76'	Report	Ackermann 63'	Attendance: 12,000; Referee: Walter Horstmann (Groß Escherde)

19 April 1973 Quarter finals - Second leg	1. FC Kaiserslautern	1–3	Borussia Mönchengladbach	Betzenbergstadion, Kaiserslautern
CET	Huber 87'	Report	Rupp 30'; Heynckes 39' (pen.); Kulik 89'	Attendance: 28,000; Referee: Rudolf Frickel (Munich)

2 May 1973 Semifinals - First leg	SV Werder Bremen	1–3	Borussia Monchengladbach	Weserstadion, Bremen
CET	Laumen 10'	Report	Jensen 6'; Rupp 9', 76'	Attendance: 32,000; Referee: Heinz Aldinger (Waiblingen)

15 May 1973 Semifinals - Second leg	Borussia Mönchengladbach	4–2	SV Werder Bremen	Bökelbergstadion, Mönchengladbach
CET	Heynckes 13', 65'; Bonhof 48'; Rupp 81'	Report	Laumen 56', 88'	Attendance: 15,000; Referee: Kurt Tschenscher (Mannheim)

23 June 1973 Final	Borussia Mönchengladbach	2–1	1. FC Köln	Rheinstadion, Düsseldorf
CET	Wimmer 24'; Netzer 94'	Report	Neumann 40'	Attendance: 69,600; Referee: Kurt Tschenscher (Mannheim)

=== UEFA Cup ===
==== First Round ====
13 September 1972 First leg	Aberdeen (Scotland)	2–3	(West Germany) Borussia Mönchengladbach	Pittodrie Stadium, Aberdeen
	Harper 55'; Jarvie 71'	UEFA Kicker	Kulik 20'; Heynckes 39'; Jensen 75'	Attendance: 20,242; Referee: Roger Machin (France)

27 September 1972 Second leg	Borussia Mönchengladbach (West Germany)	6–3	(Scotland) Aberdeen	Max-Morlock-Stadion, Nuremberg
	Rupp 2'; Heynckes 39' (pen.), 79', 89'; Vogts 70'; Danner 84' (pen.)	UEFA Kicker	Jarvie 21'; Willoughby 25'; Murray 45'	Attendance: 19,000; Referee: Francis Rion (Belgium)

Borussia Mönchengladbach won 9–5 on aggregate.

==== Second Round ====
25 October 1972 First leg	Borussia Mönchengladbach (West Germany)	3–0	(Denmark) Hvidovre	Max-Morlock-Stadion, Nuremberg
	Bonhof 42', 85'; Wimmer 60'	UEFA Kicker		Attendance: 9,741; Referee: Antoine Queudeville (Luxembourg)

8 November 1972 Second leg	Hvidovre (Denmark)	1–3	(West Germany) Borussia Mönchengladbach	Hvidovre Stadium, Hvidovre
	Nørregaard 52'	UEFA Kicker	Netzer 24', 41'; Heynckes 62'	Attendance: 4,935; Referee: Clive Thomas (Wales)

Borussia Mönchengladbach won 6–1 on aggregate.

==== Third Round ====
28 November 1972 First leg	1. FC Köln (West Germany)	0–0	(West Germany) Borussia Mönchengladbach	Müngersdorfer Stadion, Cologne
		UEFA Kicker		Attendance: 11,500; Referee: Sven Jonsson (Sweden)

13 December 1972 Second leg	Borussia Mönchengladbach (West Germany)	5–0	(West Germany) 1. FC Köln	Bökelbergstadion, Mönchengladbach
	Kulik 6'; Vogts 35'; Jensen 64', 79'; Rupp 66'	UEFA Kicker		Attendance: 16,227; Referee: Gyula Emsberger (Hungary)]

Borussia Mönchengladbach won 5–0 on aggregate.

==== Quarter-finals ====
6 March 1973 First leg	1. FC Kaiserslautern (West Germany)	1–2	(West Germany) Borussia Mönchengladbach	Fritz-Walter-Stadion, Kaiserslautern
	Toppmöller 22'	UEFA Kicker	Danner 14'; Jensen 26'	Attendance: 20,000; Referee: Gerhard Schulenburg (West Germany)

20 March 1973 Second leg	Borussia Mönchengladbach (West Germany)	7–1	(West Germany) 1. FC Kaiserslautern	Bökelbergstadion, Mönchengladbach
	Jensen 7', 85'; Netzer 42'; Heynckes 53' (pen.), 60', 82'; Danner 90' (pen.)	UEFA Kicker	Seel 26'	Attendance: 18,117; Referee: Kurt Tschenscher (West Germany)

Borussia Mönchengladbach won 9–2 on aggregate.

==== Semi-finals ====
11 April 1973 First leg	Borussia Mönchengladbach (Germany)	3–0	(Netherlands) Twente	Bökelbergstadion, Mönchengladbach
19:30	Heynckes 32', 60' (pen.); Jensen 51'	Report		Attendance: 34,110; Referee: Petar Hristov (Bulgaria)

25 April 1973 Second leg	Twente (Netherlands)	1–2	(Germany) Borussia Mönchengladbach	Diekman Stadion, Enschede
19:30	Notten 81'	Report	Drost 13' (o.g.); Rupp 27'	Attendance: 22,250; Referee: John Carpenter (Republic of Ireland)

Borussia Mönchengladbach won 5–1 on aggregate.

==== Final ====
10 May 1973 First leg	Liverpool (England)	3–0	(West Germany) Borussia Mönchengladbach	Anfield, Liverpool
	Keegan 21', 32'; Lloyd 61'	Report		Attendance: 41,169; Referee: Erich Linemayr (Austria)

23 May 1973 Second leg	Borussia Mönchengladbach (West Germany)	2–0	(England) Liverpool	Bökelbergstadion, Mönchengladbach
	Heynckes 31', 40'	Report		Attendance: 34,905; Referee: Pavel Kazakov (Soviet Union)

Liverpool won 3–2 on aggregate.
