= 1973–74 Borussia Mönchengladbach season =

Borussia Mönchengladbach
1973–74 season
- Manager: Hennes Weisweiler
- Bundesliga: Runners-up
- DFB-Pokal: Round-of-16
- Cup Winners' Cup: Semi-finals
- Top goalscorer: League: Jupp Heynckes (30 goals); All: Jupp Heynckes (42 goals)
Home colours	Away colours

The 1973–74 Borussia Mönchengladbach season was the 74th season in the club's history.

== Review and events ==
Borussia Mönchengladbach would reach runners-up in the 1973–74 Bundesliga which would lead them to qualify for the 1974-75 UEFA Cup. They would also reach the round-of-16, losing out to Hertha BSC via penalties.

== Squad ==
Note: Flags indicate national team as defined under FIFA eligibility rules; some limited exceptions apply. Players may hold more than one non-FIFA nationality.

No.	Pos.	Nation	Player
—	GK	GER	Wolfgang Kleff
—	GK	GER	Gregor Quasten
—	DF	GER	Berti Vogts
—	DF	GER	Klaus-Dieter Sieloff
—	DF	GER	Rainer Bonhof
—	DF	GER	Hans-Jürgen Wittkamp
—	DF	GER	Ulrich Surau
—	DF	GER	Walter Posner
—	MF	GER	Dietmar Danner
—	MF	GER	Horst Köppel
—	MF	GER	Herbert Wimmer

No.	Pos.	Nation	Player
—	MF	GER	Uli Stielike
—	MF	GER	Christian Kulik
—	MF	GER	Lorenz-Günther Köstner
—	MF	GER	Hans Klinkhammer
—	MF	GER	Heinz Michallik
—	FW	GER	Jupp Heynckes
—	FW	GER	Bernd Rupp
—	FW	DEN	Henning Jensen
—	FW	DEN	Allan Simonsen
—	FW	GER	Lorenz Hilkes

== Match Results ==
=== Bundesliga ===
11 August 1973 1	Borussia Mönchengladbach	3–1	SC Fortuna Köln	Bökelbergstadion, Mönchengladbach
15:30 CEST	Köppel 32', 49'; Danner 37' (pen.)	Report	Glock 89'	Attendance: 20,000; Referee: Heinz Aldinger (Waiblingen)

18 August 1973 2	Rot-Weiss Essen	2–6	Borussia Mönchengladbach	Georg-Melches-Stadion, Essen
15:30 CEST	de Vlugt 7', 37'	Report	Danner 21'; Heynckes 36', 48', 53', 71'; Wimmer 76'	Attendance: 30,000; Referee: Alfons Betz (Regensburg)

25 August 1973 3	Wuppertaler SV	2–4	Borussia Mönchengladbach	Stadion am Zoo, Wuppertal
15:30 CEST	Stöckl 9'; Bonhof 18' (o.g.)	Report	Danner 15'; Köppel 30', 45'; Heynckes 72'	Attendance: 32,000; Referee: Paul Kindervater (Köln)

29 August 1973 4	Borussia Mönchengladbach	1–1	Hertha BSC	Bökelbergstadion, Mönchengladbach
20:00 CEST	Danner 38'	Report	Hermandung 58'	Attendance: 28,000; Referee: Max Klauser (Vaterstetten)

1 September 1973 5	Borussia Mönchengladbach	6–0	FC Schalke 04	Bökelbergstadion, Mönchengladbach
15:30 CEST	Köppel 14', 35'; Rupp 47'; Heynckes 40', 50'; Danner 60'	Report		Attendance: 23,500; Referee: Karl Riegg (Augsburg)

8 September 1973 6	SV Werder Bremen	2–3	Borussia Mönchengladbach	Georg-Melches-Stadion, Essen
15:30 CEST	Weist 24'; Höttges 43'	Report	Heynckes 70', 87'; Rupp 76'	Attendance: 30,000; Referee: Rudolf Frickel (Munich)

14 September 1973 7	Borussia Mönchengladbach	4–3	Hannover 96	Bökelbergstadion, Mönchengladbach
20:00 CEST	Köppel 22'; Stielike 39'; Rupp 53'; Jensen 67'	Report	Peitsch 6'; Kasperski 80'; Deterding 82'	Attendance: 25,000; Referee: Fritz Seiler (Schmiden)

22 September 1973 8	Eintracht Frankfurt	1–0	Borussia Mönchengladbach	Waldstadion, Frankfurt
15:30 CEST	Rohrbach 47'	Report		Referee: Gerhard Schulenburg (Laatzen)

29 September 1973 9	Borussia Mönchengladbach	1–1	1. FC Köln	Bökelbergstadion, Mönchengladbach
15:30 CEST	Rupp 48'	Report	Konopka 40'	Attendance: 28,000; Referee: Wilfried Hilker (Bochum)

6 October 1973 10	MSV Duisburg	1–2	Borussia Mönchengladbach	Wedaustadion, Duisburg
15:30 CEST	Linßen 78'	Report	Köppel 43'; Simonsen 79'	Attendance: 23,000; Referee: Max Klauser (Vaterstetten)

17 October 1973 11	Borussia Mönchengladbach	2–2	1. FC Kaiserslautern	Bökelbergstadion, Mönchengladbach
15:30 CEST	Heynckes 9'; Sieloff 87'	Report	Toppmöller 74'; Laumen 89'	Attendance: 12,000; Referee: Wilfried Haselberger (Reutlingen)

20 October 1973 12	VfB Stuttgart	6–1	Borussia Mönchengladbach	Neckarstadion, Stuttgart
15:30 CEST	Handschuh 20'; Brenninger 40' (pen.); Ohlicher 55', 57'; Ettmayer 74', 78'	Report	Heynckes 48'	Attendance: 60,000; Referee: Wolfgang Dittmer (Mutterstadt)

27 October 1973 13	Borussia Mönchengladbach	2–0	VfL Bochum	Bökelbergstadion, Mönchengladbach
15:30	Jensen 21'; Heynckes 24'			Attendance: 20,000; Referee: Herbert Kollmann (Obertal)

3 November 1973 14	Hamburger SV	1–0	Borussia Mönchengladbach	Neckarstadion, Stuttgart
15:30 CEST	Kaltz 53'	Schema Report		Attendance: 51,000; Referee: Heinz Aldinger (Waiblingen)

10 November 1973 15	Kickers Offenbach	2–3	Borussia Mönchengladbach	Bieberer Berg, Offenbach
15:30 CEST	Ritschel 23' (pen.); Semlitsch 26'	Report	Heynckes 41'; Danner 67'; Jensen 73'	Attendance: 25,000; Referee: Herbert Lutz (Bremen)

17 November 1973 16	Borussia Mönchengladbach	1–2	Fortuna Düsseldorf	Bökelbergstadion, Mönchengladbach
15:30 CEST	Heynckes 64'	Report	Herzog 58'; Geye 77'	Attendance: 22,000; Referee: Kurt Tschenscher (Mannheim)

8 December 1973 17	Bayern Munich	4–3	Borussia Mönchengladbach	Olympiastadion, Munich
15:30 CEST	Roth 4'; Müller 20' (yellow card); Zobel 23'; Hoeneß 64'	Report	Wimmer 6'; Jensen 18'; Bonhof 88'	Attendance: 65,000; Referee: Walter Engel (Reimsbach)

5 January 1974 18	SC Fortuna Köln	3–5	Borussia Mönchengladbach	Radrennbahn, Köln
15:30 CEST	Kucharski 8'; Mödrath 50'; Glock 53'	Report	Rupp 17'; Köstner 41'; Heynckes 59', 74', 79'	Attendance: 15,000; Referee: Fritz Seiler (Schmiden)

12 January 1974 19	Borussia Mönchengladbach	2–2	Rot-Weiss Essen	Bökelbergstadion, Mönchengladbach
15:30 CEST	Bonhof 31'; Danner 50'	Report	de Vlugt 17'; Bast 88' (pen.)	Attendance: 15,000; Referee: Heinz Aldinger (Waiblingen)

19 January 1974 20	Hertha BSC	3–4	Borussia Mönchengladbach	Olympiastadion, Munich
15:30 CEST	Hermandung 8'; Horr 54'; Erich Beer 59'	Report	Weiner 2' (o.g.); Vogts 23'; Heynckes 23'; Jensen 52'	Attendance: 30,000; Referee: Gert Meuser (Ingelheim)

19 January 1974 21	Borussia Mönchengladbach	7–1	Borussia Mönchengladbach	Bökelbergstadion, Mönchengladbach
15:30 CEST	Heynckes 27', 71' (pen.); Vogts 34'; Danner 34'; Jensen 59'; Stielike 64'; Rupp 66'	Report	Kohle 41'	Attendance: 21,000; Referee: Walter Eschweiler (Euskirchen)

2 February 1974 22	FC Schalke 04	2–0	Borussia Mönchengladbach	Parkstadion, Gelsenkirchen
15:30 CEST	Scheer 45'; Fichtel 79'	Report		Attendance: 70,000; Referee: Ferdinand Biwersi (Bliesransbach)

15 February 1974 23	Borussia Mönchengladbach	3–1	Werder Bremen	Bökelbergstadion, Mönchengladbach
15:30 CEST	Jensen 78', 84'; Heynckes 81'	Report	Görts 21'	Attendance: 12,000; Referee: Volker Huster (Lahnstein)

2 March 1974 24	Hannover 96	0–2	Borussia Mönchengladbach	Niedersachsenstadion, Hannover
15:30 CEST		Report	Jensen 7'; Heynckes 25'	Attendance: 13,000; Referee: Karl Riegg (Augsburg)

9 March 1974 25	Borussia Mönchengladbach	0–0	Eintracht Frankfurt	Bökelbergstadion, Mönchengladbach
15:30 CEST		(Report)		Attendance: 32,000; Referee: Herbert Lutz (Bremen)

16 March 1974 26	1. FC Köln	0–1	Borussia Mönchengladbach	Niedersachsenstadion, Hannover
15:30 CEST		Report	Heynckes 87'	Attendance: 28,000; Referee: Peter Gabor (Berlin)

23 March 1974 27	Borussia Mönchengladbach	3–2	MSV Duisburg	Bökelbergstadion, Mönchengladbach
15:30 CEST	Heynckes 17'; Bonhof 31' (pen.); Vogts 45'	Report	Wunder 26', 50'	Attendance: 23,500; Referee: Dieter Berner (Enzberg)

23 March 1974 28	1. FC Kaiserslautern	2–4	Borussia Mönchengladbach	Betzenberg, Kaiserslautern
15:30 CEST	Diehl 83' (pen.); Meier 86'	Report	Danner 9'; Heynckes 11', 19'; Wittkamp 46'	Attendance: 32,200; Referee: Dieter Dreher (Bickenbach)

6 April 1974 28	Borussia Mönchengladbach	3–1	VfB Stuttgart	Bökelbergstadion, Mönchengladbach
15:30 CEST	Rupp 2', 55'; Wittkamp 36'	Report	Handschuh 90'	Attendance: 21,000; Referee: Volker Huster (Lahnstein)

20 April 1974 30	VfL Bochum	1–1	Borussia Mönchengladbach	Bochum, Stadion an der Castroper Straße
15:30 CEST	Walitza 56'		Rupp 28'	Attendance: 26,000; Referee: Kurt Tschenscher (Mannheim)

27 April 1974 31	Borussia Mönchengladbach	6–1	Hamburger SV	Bökelbergstadion, Mönchengladbach
15:30 CEST	Rupp 23'; Köppel 34', 56', 68'; Stielike 36'; Sieloff 76'	Report	Krobbach 50'	Attendance: 19,000; Referee: Volker Huster (Lahnstein)

4 May 1974 32	Borussia Mönchengladbach	5–1	Kickers Offenbach	Bökelbergstadion, Mönchengladbach
15:30 CEST	Bonhof 35'; Wittkamp 45'; Köppel 47'; Heynckes 71' (pen.), 80'	Report	Kostedde 55'	Attendance: 17,000; Referee: Jan Redelfs (Hannover)

11 May 1974 33	Fortuna Düsseldorf	1–0	Borussia Mönchengladbach	Bökelbergstadion, Mönchengladbach
15:30 CEST	Geye 8'	Report		Attendance: 45,000; Referee: Walter Engel (Reimsbach)

18 May 1974 34	Borussia Mönchengladbach	5–0	Bayern Munich	Bökelbergstadion, Mönchengladbach
15:30 CEST	Heynckes 30', 45'; Simonsen 34'; Bonhof 41'; Köstner 71'	Report		Attendance: 34,500; Referee: Ferdinand Biwersi (Bliesransbach)

=== DFB-Pokal ===
1 December 1973 First round	VfB Oldenburg	0–5	Borussia Mönchengladbach	Marschweg-Stadion, Oldenburg
14:30 CEST		Report	Heynckes 30', 45'; Simonsen 34'; Bonhof 41'; Köstner 71'	Attendance: 30,000; Referee: Peter Gabor (Berlin)

15 December 1973 Round-of-16	Borussia Mönchengladbach	2–2	Hamburger SV	Bökelbergstadion, Mönchengladbach
15:30 CEST		Report		Attendance: 10,000; Referee: Dieter Berner (Enzberg)

21 December 1973 Round-of-16	Hamburger SV	3–1	Borussia Mönchengladbach	Volksparkstadion, Hamburg
15:30 CEST		Report		Attendance: 50,000; Referee: Alfons Betz (Regensburg)

=== European Cup Winners' Cup ===
==== First Round ====
20 September 1973 First leg	ÍB Vestmannaeyja (Iceland)	0–7	(Germany) Borussia Mönchengladbach	Laugardalsvöllur, Reykjavík
			Heynckes 8', 56', 75'; Sigurgeirsson 37' (o.g.); Kulik 39', 48'; Finnbogason 62' (o.g.)	Attendance: 2,742; Referee: Pat Partridge (England)

3 October 1973 Second leg	Borussia Mönchengladbach (Germany)	9–1	(Iceland) ÍB Vestmannaeyja	Bökelbergstadion, Mönchengladbach
	Wimmer 3', 56'; Valtýsson 23' (o.g.); Simonsen 28', 33', 68'; Köppel 34', 39'; Rupp 81'		Óskarsson 65'	Attendance: 4,838; Referee: Robert Wurtz (France)

Borussia Mönchengladbach won 16–1 on aggregate.

==== Second Round ====
24 October 1973 First leg	Borussia Mönchengladbach (Germany)	3–0	(Scotland) Rangers	Bökelbergstadion, Mönchengladbach
	Heynckes 21', 64'; Rupp 87'			Attendance: 33,000; Referee: Robert Schaut (Belgium)

7 November 1973 Second leg	Rangers (Scotland)	3–2	(Germany) Borussia Mönchengladbach	Ibrox Stadium, Glasgow
	Conn 11'; Jackson 32'; MacDonald 61'		Jensen 27', 71'	Attendance: 40,000; Referee: Francisco Lobo (Portugal)

Borussia Mönchengladbach won 5–3 on aggregate.

==== Quarter-finals ====
5 March 1974 First leg	Glentoran (Northern Ireland)	0–2	(Germany) Borussia Mönchengladbach	The Oval, Belfast
			Heynckes 8'; Köppel 70'	Attendance: 7,066; Referee: Anton Bucheli (Switzerland)

20 March 1974 Second leg	Borussia Mönchengladbach (Germany)	5–0	(Northern Ireland) Glentoran	Bökelbergstadion, Mönchengladbach
	Wimmer 20'; Heynckes 22', 63'; Köppel 57'; Vogts 60'			Attendance: 11,332; Referee: Bohumil Kopcio (Czechoslovakia)

Borussia Mönchengladbach won 7–0 on aggregate.

==== Semi-finals ====
10 April 1974 First leg	Milan (Italy)	2–0	(West Germany) Borussia Mönchengladbach	San Siro, Milan
	Bigon 18'; Chiarugi 52'			Attendance: 61,285; Referee: Erich Linemayr, (Austria)

24 April 1974 Second leg	Borussia Mönchengladbach (West Germany)	1–0	(Italy) Milan	Rheinstadion, Düsseldorf
	Sabadini 23' (o.g.)			Attendance: 67,081; Referee: Ángel Franco Martínez (Spain)

Milan won 2–1 on aggregate.
