= 1973 UEFA Cup final =

- Event: 1972–73 UEFA Cup
Liverpool	Borussia Mönchengladbach
(England)	(West Germany)
3	2
- on aggregate

First leg
Liverpool	Borussia Mönchengladbach
3	0
- Date: 10 May 1973
- Venue: Anfield, Liverpool
- Referee: Erich Linemayr (Austria)
- Attendance: 41,169

Second leg
Borussia Mönchengladbach	Liverpool
2	0
- Date: 23 May 1973
- Venue: Bökelbergstadion, Mönchengladbach
- Referee: Pavel Kazakov (Soviet Union)
- Attendance: 34,905

The 1973 UEFA Cup Final was an association football match played over two-legs between Liverpool of England and Borussia Mönchengladbach of West Germany. The first leg was played at Anfield, Liverpool on 10 May 1973 and the second leg was played on 23 May 1973 at the Bökelbergstadion, Mönchengladbach. It was the final of the 1972–73 season of Europe's secondary cup competition, the UEFA Cup. Liverpool and Mönchengladbach were both appearing in their first final, although Liverpool had previously reached the final of the European Cup Winners' Cup losing 2–1 to Borussia Dortmund.

Each club needed to progress through four rounds to reach the final. Matches were contested over two legs, with a match at each team's home ground. The majority of Liverpool's ties were won by at least two goals, the exception was the semi-final against Tottenham Hotspur, which Liverpool won on the away goals rule. Borussia Mönchengladbach's ties were predominantly one-sided. The West German team won by at least four goals in all four of their ties, a 9–2 aggregate victory over 1. FC Kaiserslautern represented their biggest margin of victory.

Watched by a crowd of 41,169 at Anfield, Liverpool took the lead in the first leg when Kevin Keegan scored in the 21st minute. Another goal by Keegan in the first half, extended Liverpool's lead and a further goal by Larry Lloyd meant Liverpool won the first leg 3–0. Therefore, in the second leg at the Bökelbergstadion, Liverpool had to avoid losing by three clear goals to win the competition. A crowd of 34,905 watched Borussia take the lead in the 29th minute courtesy of a Jupp Heynckes goal, he scored again 11 minutes later to double Borussia's lead. Borussia were unable to find the third goal they needed to take the match into extra-time and won the second leg 2–0. Thus, Liverpool won the final 3–2 on aggregate to win their first European trophy.

== Route to the final ==
=== Liverpool ===
Round	Opposition	First leg	Second leg	Aggregate score
1st	Eintracht Frankfurt	2–0 (h)	0–0 (a)	2–0
2nd	AEK Athens	3–0 (h)	3–1 (a)	6–1
3rd	Dynamo Berlin	0–0 (a)	3–1 (h)	3–1
Quarter-final	Dynamo Dresden	2–0 (a)	1–0 (h)	3–0
Semi-final	Tottenham Hotspur	1–0 (h)	1–2 (a)	2–2

Liverpool qualified for the UEFA Cup as a result of finishing third in the 1971–72 Football League First Division. Their opponents in the first round were West German team Eintracht Frankfurt. Liverpool won the first leg at their home ground, Anfield, 2–0. The second leg at Frankfurt's home ground the Waldstadion ended in a 0–0 draw, which meant Liverpool progressed to the second round with a 2–0 aggregate victory. Greek team AEK Athens were the opposition. Liverpool won the first leg at Anfield 3–0, a 3–1 victory at AEK's home ground the Nikos Goumas Stadium ensured Liverpool won the tie 6–1 on aggregate.

The opposition in the third round were Dynamo Berlin of East Germany. The first leg at Dynamo's home ground the Sportforum ended in a 0–0 draw. The second leg at Anfield was more eventful Liverpool took the lead through Phil Boersma in the first minute and Dynamo equalised six minutes later. Two further goals for Liverpool secured a 3–1 victory in the match and on aggregate. In the quarter-finals Liverpool again faced East German opposition, their opponents were Dynamo Dresden. Liverpool won the first leg 2–0 at Anfield, and they won the second leg 1–0 in East Germany, to beat Dresden 3–0 on aggregate.

Reigning champions Tottenham Hotspur were the opposition in the semi-final. Liverpool won an attacking match at Anfield 1–0. The second leg at White Hart Lane was equally eventful. Tottenham took the lead in the second half when Martin Peters scored to give Spurs the lead. Seven minutes Liverpool equalised when Steve Heighway scored this levelled the match and gave Liverpool a 2–1 lead on aggregate. Tottenham went 2–1 up when Peters scored again, this levelled the aggregate score at 2–2, but Liverpool had scored an away goal, and would, therefore, progress to the next round as a result.

=== Borussia Mönchengladbach ===
Round	Opposition	First leg	Second leg	Aggregate score
1st	Aberdeen	3–2 (a)	6–3 (h)	9–5
2nd	Hvidovre IF	3–0 (h)	3–1 (a)	6–1
3rd	1. FC Köln	0–0 (a)	5–0 (h)	5–0
Quarter-final	1. FC Kaiserslautern	2–1 (a)	7–1 (h)	9–2
Semi-final	Twente	3–0 (h)	2–1 (a)	5–1

Borussia qualified for the UEFA Cup courtesy of a third-place finish in the 1971–72 Bundesliga. The opposition in the first round were Scottish side Aberdeen. The first leg was held at Aberdeen's home ground Pittodrie, with Borussia winning 3–2. The second leg at Borussia's home ground, the Bökelbergstadion, was won 6–3 by the West German side; this meant they qualified for the second round courtesy of a 9–5 aggregate victory. Danish side Hvidovre IF were the opposition in the second round. A 3–0 victory in West Germany was followed by a 3–1 victory in Denmark to secure a 6–1 aggregate victory for Borussia.

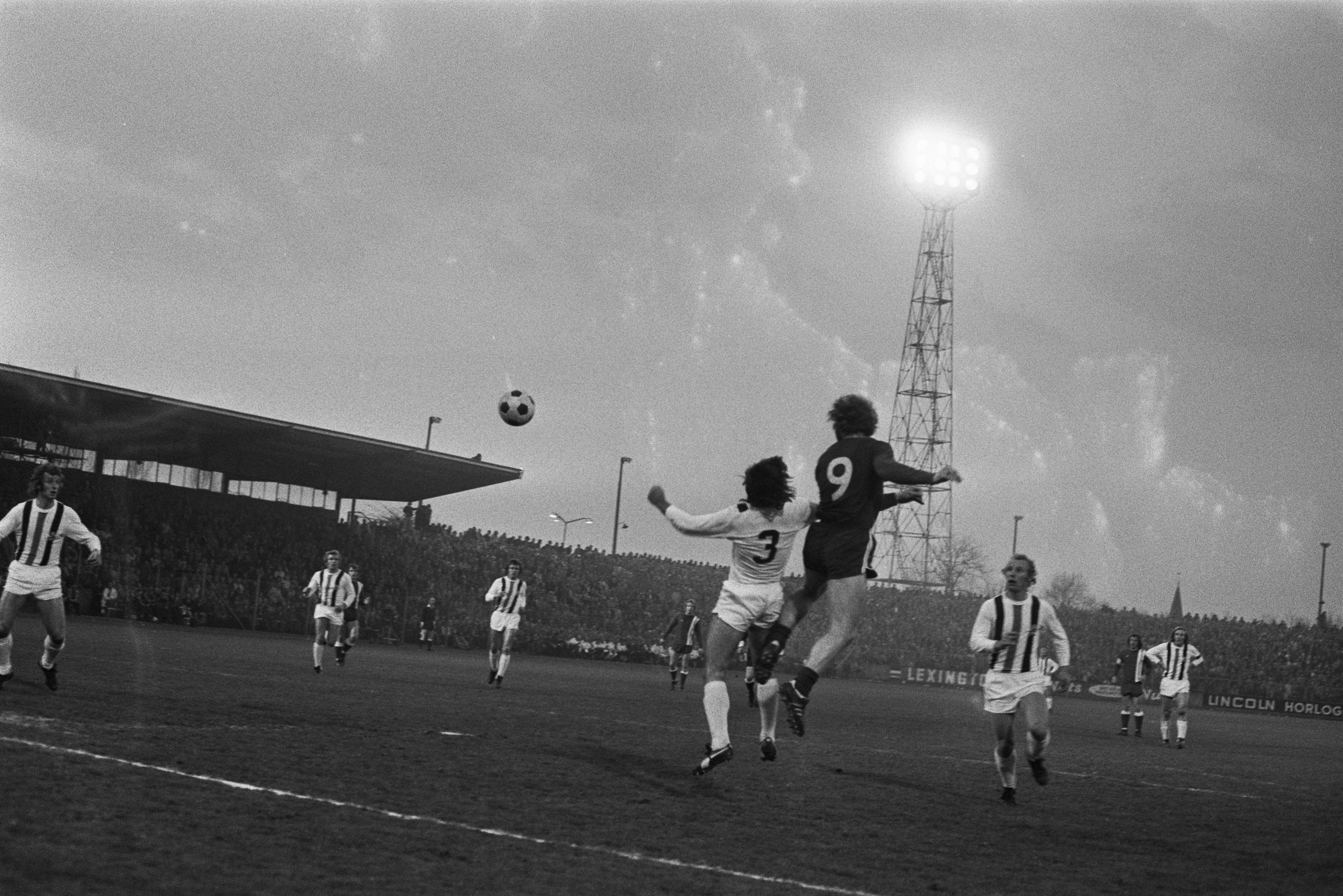
Borussia beat Twente 2–1 in the second leg to reach the final with a 5–1 aggregate victory.

Fellow West German side 1. FC Köln were the opposition in the third round. The first leg at Köln's home ground, the Müngersdorfer Stadion ended in a 0–0 draw. Borussia easily won the second leg at their home ground 5–0 to win the tie by the same score on aggregate. They were again drawn against West German opposition in the quarter-finals, the team in this instance was 1. FC Kaiserslautern. The first leg held at Kaiserlautern's home ground, the Fritz-Walter-Stadion, was won 2–1 by Borussia and a 7–1 victory in the second leg at their home ground ensured they progressed to the semi-finals courtesy of a 9–2 aggregate victory.

Dutch team Twente were Borussia's opposition in the semi-finals. The first leg was held in West Germany and Borussia won 3–0 to put themselves in a good position to reach the final, going into the second leg in the Netherlands. Borussia won the second leg 2–1 to win the tie 5–1 on aggregate and progress to their first European final.

== Background ==
Liverpool were appearing in their second European final. They had previously lost 2–1 in the final of the 1965–66 European Cup Winners' Cup against West German team Borussia Dortmund. Borussia Mönchengladbach were appearing in their first European final, they had appeared in European competition but the furthest they had progressed was the second round of the 1970–71 European Cup and 1971–72 European Cup when they were beat by English team Everton and Inter Milan of Italy respectively.

Liverpool had won the 1972–73 Football League First Division, a 2–0 victory over Leeds United ensured they became champions. Their league success meant that whatever the result they would be competing in the European Cup the following season. As a result of their league success, Liverpool were looking to become the first English team to win a European trophy in the same year as winning the league. Borussia Mönchengladbach had finished fifth in the 1972–73 Bundesliga, however they won the 1972–73 DFB-Pokal, the German domestic cup competition. This meant they would be participating in the European Cup Winners' Cup in the following season.

== First leg ==
=== Summary ===
==== Abandoned game ====
There had been heavy rain in Liverpool in the week before the first leg. Nevertheless, Austrian referee Erich Linemayr decided that the first leg on 9 May would still go ahead. The rain intensified following kick-off and the players were unable to pass the ball to each other. The referee took the decision to abandon the game after 27 minutes with the match to be played the next day.

==== Re-arranged game ====
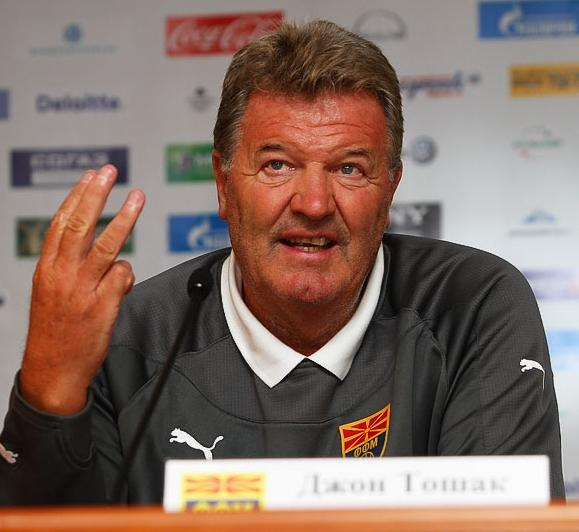
John Toshack, whose introduction in the replayed first leg contributed to Liverpool's victory.

The 27 minutes that had been played the previous day had given Liverpool manager Bill Shankly insight into how to beat Borussia. He noted that defender Günter Netzer was suspect in the air, to exploit this he decided to omit Brian Hall in place of John Toshack, whom Shankly believed would exploit this weakness. The inclusion of Toshack had the desired effect. In the 21st minute his header across the penalty area from a Chris Lawler pass, set up the first goal for Kevin Keegan, who dived forward to head the ball into the far corner of the goal.

Keegan nearly extended Liverpool's lead four minutes later when they were awarded a penalty for handball. Alec Lindsay put a high pass into the penalty area; Borussia defender Rainer Bonhof, under pressure from Toshack, handled the ball and Liverpool were awarded a penalty. However, Keegan's penalty was saved by Borussia goalkeeper Wolfgang Kleff who pushed the effort round the post. Borussia nearly made Keegan pay for his penalty miss a few minutes later, but Dietmar Danner's shot hit the post. Keegan made amends in the 33rd minute when he scored again. Emlyn Hughes headed the ball into the Borussia penalty area, Toshack who was facing away from the Borussia goal headed the ball back to Keegan, who volleyed the ball into the goal from ten yards to give Liverpool a 2–0 lead.

Liverpool extended their lead in the 60th minute when defender Larry Lloyd scored. Toshack won Liverpool a corner and with Borussia defender Netzer focusing on the striker, Lloyd was left unmarked to head in Keegan's corner and extend the English club's lead to 3–0. Despite Liverpool's goals, Borussia were presented with an opportunity to get back into the tie when they were awarded a penalty in the 65th minute. Steve Heighway's tackle on Henning Jensen was judged to be a foul by Austrian referee Linemayr. Jupp Heynckes took the penalty for the German team hitting it to Liverpool goalkeeper Ray Clemence's right, but Clemence dived the right way and saved the penalty, preventing Borussia from scoring an away goal. No further goals were scored and the referee blew for full-time with the final score 3–0 to Liverpool.

Shankly was equivocal in his praise of the players after the match stating: "It was an international-class game. Really tremendous. I am not making predictions about the second-leg, but we have a distinct advantage because we did not give away a goal." Shankly had Clemence to thank for Liverpool not conceding an away goal and the goalkeeper revealed that he had done his homework on the penalty taker Heynckes: "I watched Heynckes take a penalty in the semi-final on television and decided to dive the same way. The save was a reward for my homework."

=== Details ===
10 May 1973
19:30 BST

Liverpool (England)	3–0	(West Germany) Borussia Mönchengladbach
Keegan 21', 32'; Lloyd 61'	Report

Anfield, Liverpool
Attendance: 41,169
Referee: Erich Linemayr (Austria)

Liverpool	Borussia Mönchengladbach

GK	1	(England) Ray Clemence
RB	2	(England) Chris Lawler
CB	5	(England) Larry Lloyd
CB	4	(England) Tommy Smith (c)
LB	3	(England) Alec Lindsay
CM	6	(England) Emlyn Hughes
CM	8	(Scotland) Peter Cormack
CM	11	(England) Ian Callaghan
RW	7	(England) Kevin Keegan
CF	9	(Wales) John Toshack
LW	10	(Republic of Ireland) Steve Heighway	(substituted off) 83'
Substitutes:
DF		(England) Trevor Storton
GK	13	(England) Frankie Lane
MF	14	(Scotland) Brian Hall	(substituted on) 83'
DF	15	(England) Phil Thompson
FW	16	(England) Phil Boersma
Manager:
(Scotland) Bill Shankly

GK	1	(West Germany) Wolfgang Kleff
RB	3	(West Germany) Heinz Michallik
CB	5	(West Germany) Rainer Bonhof
CB	10	(West Germany) Günter Netzer (c)
LB	4	(West Germany) Berti Vogts
CM	8	(West Germany) Herbert Wimmer
CM	2	(West Germany) Dietmar Danner
CM	6	(West Germany) Christian Kulik
RW	7	(Denmark) Henning Jensen
CF	9	(West Germany) Bernd Rupp	(substituted off) 82'
LW	11	(West Germany) Jupp Heynckes
Substitutes:
FW	13	(Denmark) Allan Simonsen	(substituted on) 82'
Manager:
(West Germany) Hennes Weisweiler

== Second leg ==
=== Summary ===
Liverpool's 3–0 victory in the first leg meant that Borussia needed to score three goals to force the tie into extra-time. Liverpool employed a "holding action" against the "attacking Germans" in order to protect their three-goal lead. Another bout of torrential rain affected the second leg, as a result the pitch was slippery, and with the onus on Borussia to attack this caused problems for the Liverpool defence.

Knowing the task in hand Borussia bombarded Liverpool in the first half, the architect was midfielder Günter Netzer whose passing was instrumental to Borussia's play. Borussia's attacking brought their first goal in the 30th minute. Jupp Heynckes who had missed the penalty for Borussia in the first leg, scored from six yards after Bernd Rupp passed to him from the right hand side of the pitch. Heynckes extended the German side's lead in the 39th minute when he curled the ball into the Liverpool goal from left of the Liverpool penalty area.

Borussia needed one more goal to level the tie and take it into extra-time. However, despite an initial spell of dominance following the start of the second half they were unable to match the intensity that they had shown in the first half, Liverpool gained confidence from this and saw out the second half, losing the match 2–0, but they won their first European trophy as a result of a 3–2 aggregate victory. Liverpool's victory meant that they became the first English team to win a European trophy and league championship in the same season.

=== Details ===
23 May 1973
19:30 CEST

Borussia Mönchengladbach (West Germany)	2–0	(England) Liverpool
Heynckes 29', 40'	Report

Bökelbergstadion, Mönchengladbach
Attendance: 34,905
Referee: Pavel Kazakov (Soviet Union)

Borussia Mönchengladbach	Liverpool

GK	1	(West Germany) Wolfgang Kleff
RB	5	(West Germany) Rainer Bonhof
CB	3	(West Germany) Ulrich Surau
CB	4	(West Germany) Berti Vogts
LB	2	(West Germany) Dietmar Danner
CM	10	(West Germany) Günter Netzer (c)
CM	6	(West Germany) Christian Kulik
CM	8	(West Germany) Herbert Wimmer
RW	7	(Denmark) Henning Jensen
CF	9	(West Germany) Bernd Rupp
LW	11	(West Germany) Jupp Heynckes
Substitutes:
DF	12	(West Germany) Heinz Michallik
FW	13	(Denmark) Allan Simonsen
DF	14	(West Germany) Klaus-Dieter Sieloff
GK	15	(West Germany) Bernd Schrage
Manager:
(West Germany) Hennes Weisweiler

GK	1	(England) Ray Clemence
RB	2	(England) Chris Lawler
CB	5	(England) Larry Lloyd
CB	4	(England) Tommy Smith (c)
LB	3	(England) Alec Lindsay
CM	6	(England) Emlyn Hughes
CM	8	(Scotland) Peter Cormack
CM	11	(England) Ian Callaghan
RW	7	(England) Kevin Keegan
LW	9	(Republic of Ireland) Steve Heighway	(substituted off) 77'
CF	10	(Wales) John Toshack
Substitutes:
MF	12	(Scotland) Brian Hall
GK	13	(England) Frankie Lane
FW	14	(England) Phil Boersma	(substituted on) 77'
DF	15	(England) Phil Thompson
DF	16	(England) Trevor Storton
Manager:
(Scotland) Bill Shankly

== See also ==
- 1972–73 Liverpool F.C. season
- 1972–73 Borussia Mönchengladbach season
- 1973 European Cup final
- 1973 European Cup Winners' Cup final
- 1977 European Cup final – contested between same teams
- Liverpool F.C. in international football

== Bibliography ==
- Hale, Steve; Ponting, Ivan (1992). Liverpool in Europe. London: Guinness Publishing. ISBN 0-85112-569-7.
- Nawrat, Chris; Hutchings, Steve (1995). The Sunday Times Illustrated History of Football: The Post-War Years. London: Chancellor Press. ISBN 1-85153-014-2.
- Kelly, Stephen F. (1988). The Official Illustrated History of Liverpool FC: You'll Never Walk Alone. London: Queen Anne Press. ISBN 0-356-19594-5.
- Liversedge, Stan (1991). Liverpool: The Official Centenary History. London: Hamlyn Publishing Group. ISBN 0-600-57308-7.
