= 1974–75 Borussia Mönchengladbach season =

Borussia Mönchengladbach
1974–75 season
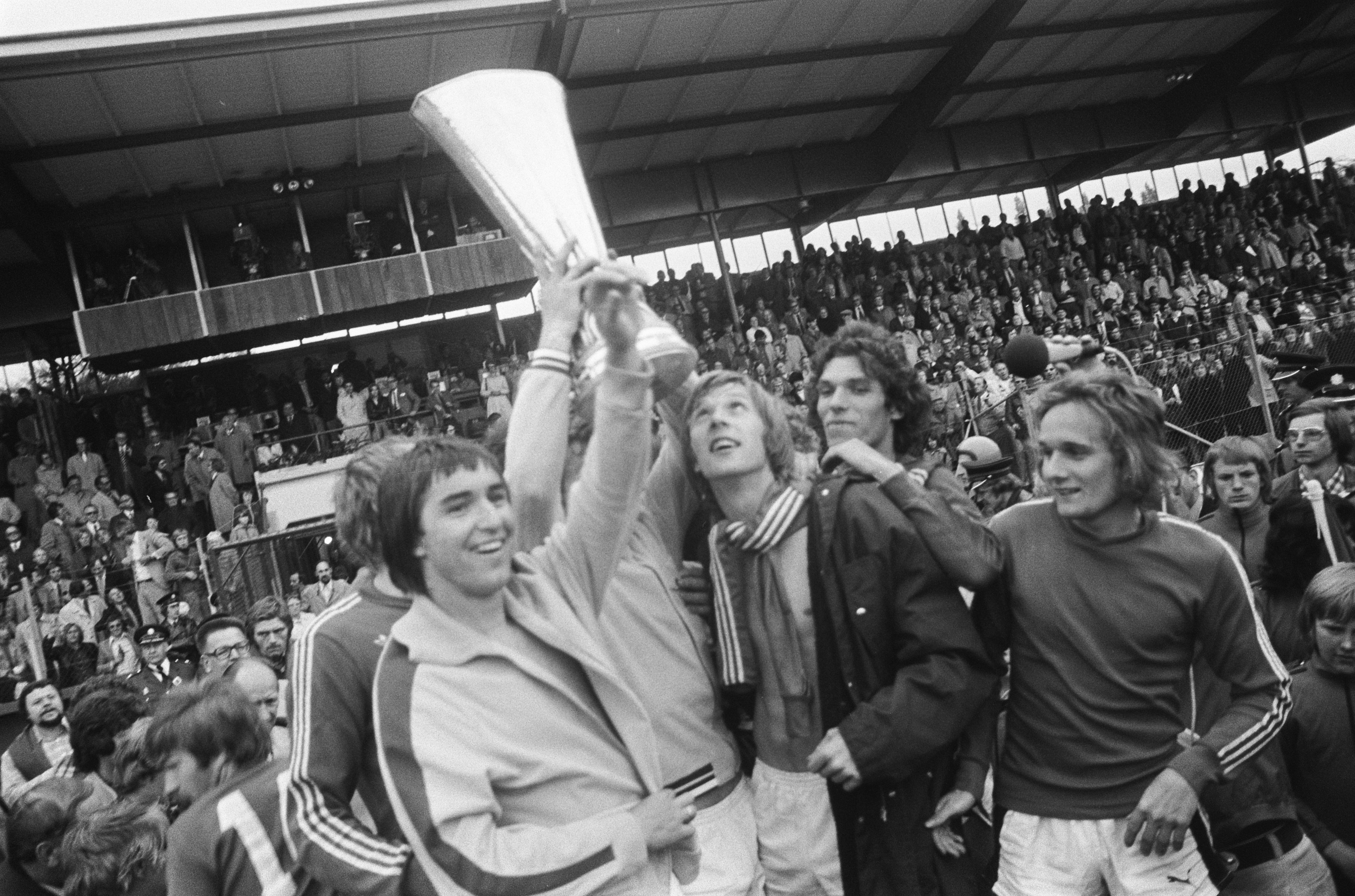
- Borussia Mönchengladbach players with the UEFA Cup
- Manager: Hennes Weisweiler
- Bundesliga: Winners
- DFB-Pokal: Second round
- UEFA Cup: Winners
- Top goalscorer: League: Jupp Heynckes (27 goals); All: Jupp Heynckes (42 goals)

The 1974–75 Borussia Mönchengladbach season was the 75th season in club history. The club won a double of the Bundesliga and UEFA Cup.

== Review and events ==
Borussia Mönchengladbach won the double. The club faced 1. FC Köln 5 times during the season which includes two Bundesliga matches, two UEFA Cup matches and one DFB-Pokal match. The club won three, drew twice and lost once against 1. FC Köln.

== Squad ==
Note: Flags indicate national team as defined under FIFA eligibility rules; some limited exceptions apply. Players may hold more than one non-FIFA nationality.

No.	Pos.	Nation	Player
—	GK	GER	Wolfgang Kleff
—	GK	GER	Gregor Quasten
—	DF	GER	Rainer Bonhof
—	DF	GER	Hans Klinkhammer
—	DF	GER	Norbert Kox
—	DF	GER	Walter Posner
—	DF	GER	Frank Schäffer
—	DF	GER	Ulrich Surau
—	DF	GER	Berti Vogts
—	DF	GER	Hans-Jürgen Wittkamp
—	MF	GER	Dietmar Danner
—	MF	GER	Horst Köppel

No.	Pos.	Nation	Player
—	MF	GER	Lorenz-Günther Köstner
—	MF	GER	Christian Kulik
—	MF	GER	Uli Stielike
—	MF	GER	Herbert Wimmer
—	FW	GER	Karl Del'Haye
—	FW	GER	Jupp Heynckes
—	FW	GER	Lorenz Hilkes
—	FW	DEN	Henning Jensen
—	FW	DEN	Allan Simonsen
—	FW	BEL	Roger Roebbens

== Match results ==
=== Legend ===
Win Draw Loss Postponed

=== Bundesliga ===
==== League table ====
Pos	Team	Pld	W	D	L	GF	GA	GD	Pts	Qualification or relegation
1	Borussia Mönchengladbach (C)	34	21	8	5	86	40	+46	50	Qualification to European Cup first round
2	Hertha BSC	34	19	6	9	61	43	+18	44	Qualification to UEFA Cup first round
3	Eintracht Frankfurt	34	18	7	9	89	49	+40	43	Qualification to Cup Winners' Cup first round
4	Hamburger SV	34	18	7	9	55	38	+17	43	Qualification to UEFA Cup first round
5	1. FC Köln	34	17	7	10	77	51	+26	41	Qualification to UEFA Cup first round

Source: www.dfb.de
Rules for classification: 1) points; 2) goal difference; 3) number of goals scored.
(C) Champions

24 August 1974 1	Borussia Mönchengladbach	1–3	Hamburger SV	Mönchengladbach
15:30	Heynckes 57'		Zaczyk 42'; Björnmose 55'; Eigl 64'	Stadium: Bökelbergstadion; Attendance: 23,000; Referee: Karl Riegg

31 August 1974 2	Eintracht Frankfurt	1–1	Borussia Mönchengladbach	Frankfurt
15:30	Holzenbein 38'		Wittkamp 76'	Stadium: Waldstadion; Attendance: 41,000; Referee: Walter Horstmann

10 September 1974 3	Borussia Mönchengladbach	3–1	Tennis Borussia Berlin	Mönchengladbach
20:00	Bonhof 36' (pen.); Wittkamp 47'; Simonsen 61'		Geyer 17'	Stadium: Bökelbergstadion; Attendance: 15,000; Referee: Jürgen Messmer

14 September 1974 4	Kaiserslautern	1–3	Borussia Mönchengladbach	Kaiserslautern
20:00	Sandberg 14'		Jensen 34', 66'; Simonsen 57'	Stadium: Stadion Betzenberg; Attendance: 32,000; Referee: Heinz Aldinger

21 September 1974 5	Borussia Mönchengladbach	4–1	MSV Duisburg	Mönchengladbach
15:30	Wimmer 32'; Heynckes 64', 77'; Simonsen 70'		Lehmann 76'	Stadium: Bökelbergstadion; Attendance: 23,300; Referee: Peter Gabor

28 September 1974 6	Rot-Weiss Essen	1–3	Borussia Mönchengladbach	Essen
15:30	Lippens 34'		Jensen 31'; Heynckes 62', 86'	Stadium: Georg-Melches-Stadion; Attendance: 18,000; Referee: Kurt Tschenscher

5 October 1974 7	Borussia Mönchengladbach	3–0	VfL Bochum	Mönchengladbach
15:30	Jensen 32', 42'; Simonsen 54' (pen.)			Stadium: Bökelbergstadion; Attendance: 13,100; Referee: Wolfgang Dittmer

9 October 1974 8	Fortuna Düsseldorf	3–2	Borussia Mönchengladbach	Düsseldorf
20:00	Brei 35'; Zewe 65'; Geye 74' (pen.)		Wittkamp 38'; Simonsen 60'	Stadium: Rheinstadion; Attendance: 48,000; Referee: Wilfried Haselberger

12 October 1974 9	Borussia Mönchengladbach	1–2	Bayern Munich	Mönchengladbach
15:30	Wittkamp 36'		Wunder 71'; Torstensson 73'	Stadium: Bökelbergstadion; Attendance: 34,500; Referee: Walter Engel

18 October 1974 10	Kickers Offenbach	4–3	Borussia Mönchengladbach	Offenbach am Main
20:00	Hickersberger 2'; Ritschel 47'; Kostedde 70'; Schwemmle 78'		Simonsen 34', 41' (pen.), 57'	Stadium: Bieberer Berg; Attendance: 31,000; Referee: Jan Redelfs

2 November 1974 11	Borussia Mönchengladbach	1–1	Hertha BSC	Mönchengladbach
15:30	Wittkamp 64'		Hermandung 27'	Stadium: Bökelbergstadion; Attendance: 13,000; Referee: Max Klauser

9 November 1974 12	VfB Stuttgart	1–2	Borussia Mönchengladbach	Stuttgart
15:30	Ohlicher 85'		Heynckes 20'} Entenmann 63' (o.g.)	Stadium: Neckarstadion; Attendance: 26,000; Referee: Ferdinand Biwersi

16 November 1974 13	Borussia Mönchengladbach	1–1	1. FC Köln	Mönchengladbach
15:30	Jensen 18'		Müller 26'	Stadium: Bökelbergstadion; Attendance: 20,000; Referee: Günter Linn

23 November 1974 14	Wuppertaler SV	1–5	Borussia Mönchengladbach	Wuppertal
15:30	Galbierz 54'		Kulik 20', 73'; Heynckes 61', 88'; Simonsen 81'	Stadium: Stadion am Zoo; Attendance: 11,000; Referee: Jürgen Messmer

22 January 1975 15	Borussia Mönchengladbach	1–0	Schalke 04	Mönchengladbach
20:00	Heynckes 66'			Stadium: Bökelbergstadion; Attendance: 32,000; Referee: Karl Riegg

19 January 1975 16	Eintracht Braunschweig	1–3	Borussia Mönchengladbach	Braunschweig
15:30	Danner 34' (o.g.)		Kulik 12'; Jensen 15'; Merkhoffer 68' (o.g.)	Stadium: Eintracht-Stadion; Attendance: 35,000; Referee: Kurt Tschenscher

14 December 1974 17	Borussia Mönchengladbach	4–2	Werder Bremen	Mönchengladbach
15:30	Heynckes 9', 75'; Jensen 20'; Köstner 34'		Röntved 32', 88'	Stadium: Bökelbergstadion; Attendance: 9,900; Referee: Heinz Quindeau

25 January 1975 18	Hamburger SV	1–1	Borussia Mönchengladbach	Hamburg
15:30	Nogly 56'		Jensen 55'	Stadium: Volksparkstadion; Attendance: 56,000; Referee: Heinz Aldinher

1 February 1975 19	Borussia Mönchengladbach	3–0	Eintracht Frankfurt	Mönchengladbach
15:30	Kulik 24'; Simonsen 33'; Heynckes 40'			Stadium: Bökelbergstadion; Attendance: 24,300; Referee: Ferdinand Biwersi

15 February 1975 20	Tennis Borussia Berlin	1–4	Borussia Mönchengladbach	Berlin
15:30	Stolzenburg 33'		Heynckes 27', 50', 88'; Bonhof 68'	Stadium: Mommsenstadion; Attendance: 9,000; Referee: Walter Horstmann

22 February 1975 21	Borussia Mönchengladbach	3–0	Kaiserslautern	Mönchengladbach
15:30	Toppmöller 59' (o.g.); Simonsen 72'; Heynckes 90+1'			Stadium: Bökelbergstadion; Attendance: 24,300; Referee: Karl-Heinz Pickler

1 March 1982 22	MSV Duisburg	1–1	Borussia Mönchengladbach	Duisburg
15:30	Bücker 83'		Bonhof 24'	Stadium: Wedaustadion; Attendance: 29,000; Referee: Klaus Ohmsen

8 March 1975 23	Borussia Mönchengladbach	1–1	Rot-Weiss Essen	Mönchengladbach
15:30	Heynckes 14'		Wörmer 25'	Stadium: Bökelbergstadion; Attendance: 21,500; Referee: Herbert Lutz

22 March 1975 24	VfL Bochum	0–0	Borussia Mönchengladbach	Bochum
15:30				Stadium: Ruhrstadion; Attendance: 29,000; Referee: Karl Riegg

26 March 1975 25	Borussia Mönchengladbach	3–1	Fortuna Düsseldorf	Mönchengladbach
15:30	Jensen 11'; Heynckes 40', 48'		Hesse 90'	Stadium: Bökelbergstadion; Attendance: 24,000; Referee: Hermann Schröder

13 April 1975 26	Bayern Munich	1–1	Borussia Mönchengladbach	Munich
15:30	Müller 90' (pen.)		Kulik 80'	Stadium: Munich Olympic Stadium; Attendance: 72,000; Referee: Volker Roth

5 April 1975 27	Borussia Mönchengladbach	5–1	Kickers Offenbach	Mönchengladbach
15:30	Heynckes 18', 87'; Simonsen 19', 79' (pen.); Wittkamp 45'		Kostedde 24'; Schimdradner 68'	Stadium: Bökelbergstadion; Attendance: 27,500; Referee: Walter Horstmann

19 April 1975 28	Hertha BSC	2–1	Borussia Mönchengladbach	Berlin
15:30	Müller 31', 75'		Stielike 23'	Stadium: Berlin Olympic Stadium; Attendance: 80,000; Referee: Ferdinand Biwersi

3 May 1975 29	Borussia Mönchengladbach	5–1	VfB Stuttgart	Mönchengladbach
15:30	Jensen 3'; Danner 38', 69'; Kulik 53'; Bonhof 60'		Hadewicz 79'	Stadium: Bökelbergstadion; Attendance: 15,000; Referee: Günter Linn

10 May 1975 30	1. FC Köln	1–2	Borussia Mönchengladbach	Cologne
15:30	Löhr 37' (pen.)		Simonsen 3'; Danner 59'	Stadium: Müngersdorfer Stadion; Attendance: 28,000; Referee: Heinz Aldinger

24 May 1975 31	Borussia Mönchengladbach	6–2	Wuppertaler SV	Mönchengladbach
15:30	Simonsen 13' (pen.), 18', 53'; Heynckes 41', 51', 88'		Berghaus 25'; Jung 65'	Stadium: Bökelbergstadion; Attendance: 22,500; Referee: Wolfgang Dittmer

31 May 1975 32	Schalke 04	1–3	Borussia Mönchengladbach	Gelsenkirchen
15:30	Kremers 50'		Simonsen 35' (pen.); Bonhof 40'; Heynckes 85'	Stadium: Parkstadion; Attendance: 70,000; Referee: Karl Riegg

7 June 1975 33	Borussia Mönchengladbach	2–0	Eintracht Braunschweig	Mönchengladbach
15:30	Jensen 88', 90'			Stadium: Bökelbergstadion; Attendance: 31,000; Referee: Wilfried Haselberger

14 June 1975 34	Werder Bremen	1–4	Borussia Mönchengladbach	Bremen
15:30	Röber 17'		Bonhof 19'; Heynckes 40', 87'; Köppel 80'	Stadium: Weserstadion; Attendance: 31,000; Referee: Dieter Berner

=== DFB-Pokal ===
7 September 1974 First round	TV Gültstein	0–5	Borussia Mönchengladbach	Ammerstadion, Gültstein
			Köppel 15'; Heynckes 22', 58', 79'; Wittkamp 72'	Attendance: 6,000; Referee: Heinz Kettenbach

29 January 1975 Second round	Borussia Mönchengladbach	3–5	1. FC Köln	Bökelbergstadion, Mönchengladbach
	Heynckes 13'; Wimmer 30'; Simonsen 34' (pen.)		Flohe 31', 39' (pen.); Konopka 35'; Neumann 44'; Müller 60'	Attendance: 15,000; Referee: Rudolf Frickel

=== UEFA Cup ===
==== First round ====
18 September 1974 First leg	(Austria) Wacker Innsbruck	2–1	(West Germany) Borussia Mönchengladbach	Tivoli Stadion Tirol, Innsbruck
20:00	Flindt Bjerg 53', 55'		Heynckes 62'	Attendance: 16,000; Referee: Jozef Korček (Czechoslovakia)

2 October 1974 Second leg	(West Germany) Borussia Mönchengladbach	3–0 (2–4 agg.)	(Austria) Wacker Innsbruck	Bökelbergstadion, Mönchengladbach
	Vogts 11'; Heynckes 66'; Jensen 70'			Attendance: 17,041; Referee: Ernst Dörflinger (Switzerland)

==== Second round ====
22 October 1974 First leg	(West Germany) Borussia Mönchengladbach	1–0	(France) Lyon	Bökelbergstadion, Mönchengladbach
	Simonsen 8'			Attendance: 4,769; Referee: Marijan Raus (Yugoslavia

5 November 1974 Second leg	(France) Lyon	2–5 (6–2 agg.)	(West Germany) Borussia Mönchengladbach	Stade de Gerland, Lyon
	Valette 1'; Domenech 71'		Bonhof 23', 50'; Simonsen 28', 89'; Kulik 64'	Attendance: 34,988; Referee: Antonio Camacho Jiménez (Spain)

==== Third round ====
27 November 1974 First leg	(West Germany) Borussia Mönchengladbach	5–0	(Spain) Real Zaragoza	Bökelbergstadion, Mönchengladbach
	Simonsen 8' (pen.) 32'; Heynckes 24', 76'; Bonhof 45'			Attendance: 14,000; Referee: Erik Axelryd (Sweden)

11 December 1974 Second leg	(Spain) Real Zaragoza	2–4 (9–2 agg.)	(West Germany) Borussia Mönchengladbach	La Romareda, Zaragoza
	Violeta 11'; Galdós 63'		Simonsen 18'; Heynckes 20', 89'; Stielike 75'	Attendance: 25,000; Referee: William Gow (Wales)

==== Quarter-finals ====
5 March 1975 First leg	(Czechoslovakia) Baník Ostrava	0–1	(West Germany) Borussia Mönchengladbach	Bazaly, Ostrava
			Heynckes 51'	Attendance: 32,269; Referee: Robert Wurtz (France)

19 March 1975 Second leg	(West Germany) Borussia Mönchengladbach	3–1 (1–4 agg.)	(Czechoslovakia) Baník Ostrava	Bökelbergstadion, Mönchengladbach
	Mička 10' (o.g.); Heynckes 46'; Vogts 50'		Hudeček 67'	Attendance: 10,119; Referee: Rolf Nyhus (Norway)

==== Semi-finals ====
9 April 1975 First leg	(West Germany) 1. FC Köln	1–3	(West Germany) Borussia Mönchengladbach	Müngersdorfer Stadion, Cologne
	Löhr 52'		Simonsen 23', 60'; Danner 35'	Attendance: 26,745; Referee: Bob Matthewson (England)

23 April 1975 Second leg	(West Germany) Borussia Mönchengladbach	1–0 (1–4 agg.)	(West Germany) 1. FC Köln	Bökelbergstadion, Mönchengladbach
	Danner 48'			Attendance: 29,575; Referee: Milivoje Gugulović (Yugoslavia)

==== Final ====
7 May 1975 First leg	(West Germany) Borussia Mönchengladbach	0–0	(Netherlands) FC Twente	Rheinstadion, Düsseldorf
				Attendance: 42,638; Referee: Károly Palotai (Hungary)

21 May 1975 Second leg	(Netherlands) FC Twente	1–5 (1–5 agg.)	(West Germany) Borussia Mönchengladbach	Diekman Stadion, Enschede
	Drost 76'		Simonsen 2', 87' (pen.); Heynckes 9', 50', 60'	Attendance: 21,767; Referee: Paul Schiller (Austria)
