= 1971–72 Borussia Mönchengladbach season =

Borussia Mönchengladbach
1971–72 season
- Chairman: Helmut Beyer
- Manager: Hennes Weisweiler
- Bundesliga: 3rd
- DFB-Pokal: Quarter-finals
- European Cup: Round of 16
- Top goalscorer: League: Jupp Heynckes (19 goals); All: Jupp Heynckes (22 goals)
Home colours	Away colours

The 1971–72 Borussia Mönchengladbach season was the 73rd season in the club's history and the 7th in the top-flight of German football. The season began on 14 August 1971 against 1. FC Kaiserslautern and finished on 5 April 1972 against FC Schalke 04.

== Season overview ==
In the 1971–72 season, Borussia Mönchengladbach, coached by Hennes Weisweiler, finished the 1971–72 Bundesliga in 3rd place with a total of 18 wins, 7 draws and 9 losses. The team's top scorer was Jupp Heynckes with 19 goals. In the 1971–72 European Cup, Borussia Mönchengladbach were eliminated in the round of 16 by Inter Milan, after losing 4–2 in Milan and drawing 0–0 in Berlin in the replay of the first leg. During the initial first leg match, which went down in history as the Match of the Can, Borussia had won 7-1 but the result had not been approved by UEFA due to a Mönchengladbach fan throwing a can of Coca-Cola that hit Italian forward Roberto Boninsegna.

== Squad ==
Note: Flags indicate national team as defined under FIFA eligibility rules; some limited exceptions apply. Players may hold more than one non-FIFA nationality.

No.	Pos.	Nation	Player
—	GK	GER	Wolfgang Kleff
—	GK	GER	Gregor Quasten
—	GK	GER	Bernd Schrage
—	DF	GER	Berti Vogts
—	DF	GER	Klaus-Dieter Sieloff
—	DF	GER	Rainer Bonhof
—	DF	GER	Ludwig Müller
—	DF	GER	Hans-Jürgen Wittkamp
—	DF	GER	Ulrich Surau
—	DF	GER	Hartwig Bleidick
—	MF	GER	Dietmar Danner
—	MF	GER	Herbert Wimmer
—	MF	GER	Christian Kulik

No.	Pos.	Nation	Player
—	MF	GER	Heinz Michallik
—	MF	GER	Rainer Malzkorn
—	MF	GER	Hans-Jürgen Wloka
—	FW	GER	Jupp Heynckes
—	FW	GER	Bernd Rupp
—	FW	GER	Günter Netzer
—	FW	DEN	Ulrik le Fevre
—	FW	GER	Hans-Jürgen Greven
—	FW	GER	Siegfried Zoppke
—	FW	GER	Robert Fahrian
—	FW	GER	Wilfried Stevens
—	FW	GER	Peter Wloka

== Transfers ==
Transfers In
Date	Name	From	Transfer Fee
Summer 1972	(Germany) Dietmar Danner	(Germany) VfR Mannheim	
Summer 1972	(Germany) Christian Kulik	(Germany) Alemannia Aachen	
Summer 1972	(Germany) Heinz Michallik	(Germany) Gütersloh	
Summer 1972	(Germany) Ulrich Surau	(Germany) Alemannia Aachen	
Summer 1972	(Germany) Hans-Jürgen Wittkamp	(Germany) FC Schalke 04	
		Total Transfer Fees	

Transfer Out
Date	Name	To	Transfer Fee
Summer 1971	(Germany) Werner Adler	(Germany) Karlsruher SC	
Summer 1971	(Germany) Peter Dietrich	(Germany) Werder Bremen	
Summer 1971	(Germany) Horst Köppel	(Germany) VfB Stuttgart	
Summer 1971	(Germany) Herbert Laumen	(Germany) Werder Bremen	
		Total Transfer Fees	

== Match results ==
=== Legend ===
Win Draw Loss

=== Bundesliga ===
14 August 1971 1	1. FC Kaiserslautern	1–0	Borussia Mönchengladbach	Betzenbergstadion, Kaiserslautern
15:30 CET	Bitz 71'	Report		Attendance: 33,000; Referee: Karl Riegg (Augsburg)

21 August 1971 2	Borussia Mönchengladbach	5–1	Arminia Bielefeld	Bökelbergstadion, Mönchengladbach
15:30 CET	Heynckes 33', 37'; Netzer 39', 87' (pen.); Fevre 67'	Report	Kasperski 60'	Attendance: 16,000; Referee: Diedrich Basedow (Hamburg)

28 August 1971 3	VfL Bochum	0–2	Borussia Mönchengladbach	Stadion an der Castroper Straße, Bochum
15:30			Heynckes 34'; Wloka 70'	Attendance: 35,000; Referee: Kurt Tschenscher (Mannheim)

1 September 1971 4	Borussia Mönchengladbach	0–0	VfB Stuttgart	Bökelbergstadion, Mönchengladbach
20:00 CET		Report		Attendance: 22,000; Referee: Walter Horstmann (Groß Escherde)

3 September 1971 5	Bayern Munich	2–0	Borussia Mönchengladbach	Munich
20:00 CET	Roth 27'; Hoeneß 31'	Report		Stadium: Grünwalder Stadion; Attendance: 40,000; Referee: Klaus Ohmsen (Hamburg)

11 September 1971 6	Borussia Mönchengladbach	3–0	Hannover 96	Bökelbergstadion, Mönchengladbach
15:30 CET	Netzer 18' (pen.); Bonhof 45'; Wittkamp 57'	Report		Attendance: 15,000; Referee: Ferdinand Biwersi (Bliesransbach)

18 September 1971 7	MSV Duisburg	1–5	Borussia Mönchengladbach	Wedaustadion, Duisburg
15:30 CET	Wunder 59'	Report	Müller 15', 53'; Wloka 27'; Heynckes 70'; Fevre 84'	Attendance: 30,000; Referee: Horst Bonacker (Quadrath-Ichendorf)

25 September 1971 8	Borussia Mönchengladbach	1–0	Hamburger SV	Bökelbergstadion, Mönchengladbach
15:30 CET	Netzer 75'	Report		Attendance: 20,000; Referee: Heinz Aldinger (Waiblingen)

2 October 1971 9	1. FC Köln	4–3	Borussia Mönchengladbach	Müngersdorfer Stadion, Cologne
15:30 CET	Hemmersbach 15'; Flohe 44'; Scheermann 47', 80'	Report	Netzer 21', 68'; Fevre 42'	Attendance: 25,000; Referee: Gerhard Schulenburg (Laatzen)

13 October 1971 10	Borussia Mönchengladbach	6–2	Eintracht Frankfurt	Bökelbergstadion, Mönchengladbach
20:00 CET	Müller 22' (pen.); Wittkamp 30'; Danner 63', 70'; Heynckes 81' (pen.), 89' (pen.)	Report	Konca 1'; Grabowski 64'	Attendance: 12,000; Referee: Herbert Lutz (Bremen)

16 October 1971 11	Borussia Dortmund	0–0	Borussia Mönchengladbach	Stadion Rote Erde, Dortmund
15:30 CET		Report		Attendance: 28,000; Referee: Walter Eschweiler (Euskirchen)

23 October 1971 12	Borussia Mönchengladbach	7–0	FC Schalke 04	Bökelbergstadion, Mönchengladbach
15:30 CET	Heynckes 4', 29'; Netzer 6' (pen.), 64'; Bleidick 23'; Fevre 36', 52'	Report		Attendance: 27,000; Referee: Rudolf Schröck (Riegelsberg)

30 October 1971 13	Fortuna Düsseldorf	0–2	Borussia Mönchengladbach	Flinger Broich, Düsseldorf
15:30 CET		Report	Heynckes 32'; Kulik 36'	Attendance: 25,000; Referee: Gert Meuser (Ingelheim)

6 November 1971 14	Borussia Mönchengladbach	5–2	Hertha BSC	Bökelbergstadion, Mönchengladbach
15:30 CET	Sieloff 40' (pen.); Wloka 43'; Heynckes 55'; Danner 59'; Wimmer 66'	Report	Varga 57'; Horr 78' (pen.)	Attendance: 16,000; Referee: Kurt Tschenscher (Mannheim)

13 November 1971 15	Eintracht Braunschweig	2–1	Borussia Mönchengladbach	Stadion an der Hamburger Straße, Braunschweig
15:30 CET	Grzyb 52'; Bäse 71'	Report	Heynckes 42'	Attendance: 18,000; Referee: Dieter Berner (Enzberg)

27 November 1971 16	Borussia Mönchengladbach	5–2	Rot-Weiß Oberhausen	Bökelbergstadion, Mönchengladbach
15:30 CET	Kulik 49'; Netzer 57'; Wimmer 70'; Bonhof 72'; Fevre 90'	Report	Hollmann 3'; Hoffmann 26'	Attendance: 13,000; Referee: Fritz Seiler (Schmiden)

11 December 1971 17	Werder Bremen	2–2	Borussia Mönchengladbach	Weserstadion, Bremen
15:30 CET	Hasebrink 65'; Laumen 73'	Report	Sieloff 39'; Kulik 47'	Attendance: 35,000; Referee: Alfons Betz (Regensburg)

22 January 1972 18	Borussia Mönchengladbach	2–1	1. FC Kaiserslautern	Bökelbergstadion, Mönchengladbach
15:30 CET	Netzer 47' (rig); Danner 70'	Report	Vogt 20'	Attendance: 15,000; Referee: Philipp Geng (Freiburg)

29 January 1972 19	Arminia Bielefeld	2–3	Borussia Mönchengladbach	Bielefelder Alm, Bielefeld
15:30 CET	Roggensack 43'; Słomiany 52'	Report	51' Vogts; 63' Sieloff; 88' Heynckes	Attendance: 20,000; Referee: Karl-Heinz Picker (Hamburg)

8 February 1972 20	Borussia Mönchengladbach	1–1	VfL Bochum	Bökelbergstadion, Mönchengladbach
20:00 CET	Kulik 79'		Walitza 29'	Attendance: 20,000; Referee: Wolfgang Dittmer (Mutterstadt)

19 February 1972 21	VfB Stuttgart	0–1	Borussia Mönchengladbach	Neckarstadion, Stuttgart
15:00 CET		Report	Heynckes 52'	Attendance: 30,000; Referee: Diedrich Basedow (Hamburg)

26 February 1972 22	Borussia Mönchengladbach	2–2	Bayern Munich	Bökelbergstadion, Mönchengladbach
15:30 CET	Heynckes 4', 20'	Report	Schneider 23'; Roth 47'	Attendance: 30,000; Referee: Gerhard Schulenburg (Hamburg)

4 March 1972 23	Hannover 96	2–0	Borussia Mönchengladbach	Niedersachsenstadion, Hannover
15:30 CET	Keller 41'; Weller 61'	Report		Attendance: 38,000; Referee: Fritz Seiler (Schmiden)

11 March 1972 24	Borussia Mönchengladbach	3–0	MSV Duisburg	Bökelbergstadion, Mönchengladbach
15:30 CET	Wimmer 53'; Heynckes 55'; Fevre 84'	Report		Attendance: 10,000; Referee: Heinz Aldinger (Waiblingen)

18 March 1972 25	Hamburger SV	1–0	Borussia Mönchengladbach	Volksparkstadion, Hannover
15:30 CET	Seeler 25'	Report		Attendance: 26,000; Referee: Alfons Betz (Regensburg)

25 March 1972 26	Borussia Mönchengladbach	3–0	1. FC Köln	Bökelbergstadion, Mönchengladbach
15:30 CET	Netzer 28'; Fevre 75'; Wimmer 85'	Report		Attendance: 21,000; Referee: Ferdinand Biwersi (Bliesransbach)

8 April 1972 27	Eintracht Frankfurt	3–0	Borussia Mönchengladbach	Waldstadion, Frankfurt
15:30 CET	Grabowski 23'; Heese 59'; Hölzenbein 66'	Report		Attendance: 36,000; Referee: Diedrich Basedow (Hamburg)

15 April 1972 28	Borussia Mönchengladbach	7–1	Borussia Dortmund	Bökelbergstadion, Mönchengladbach
15:30 CET	Fevre 20', 76'; Netzer 28' (rig), 48', 52'; Wimmer 55'; Danner 80'	Report	Bücker 67'	Attendance: 8,000; Referee: Walter Horstmann (Groß Escherde)

22 April 1972 29	FC Schalke 04	1–1	Borussia Mönchengladbach	Glückauf-Kampfbahn, Gelsenkirchen
15:30 CET	Lütkebohmert 54'	Report	Netzer 42'	Attendance: 40,000; Referee: Horst Herden (Hamburg)

6 May 1972 30	Borussia Mönchengladbach	1–2	Fortuna Düsseldorf	Bökelbergstadion, Mönchengladbach
15:30 CET	Netzer 40'	Report	Geye 10'; Herzog 66'	Attendance: 15,000; Referee: Erich Pfleiderer (Heilbronn)

27 May 1972 31	Hertha BSC	2–1	Borussia Mönchengladbach	Olympiastadion, Berlin
15:30 CET	Hermandung 1'; Beer 33'	Report	Heynckes 80'	Attendance: 10,000; Referee: Roth (Salzgitter)

3 June 1972 32	Borussia Mönchengladbach	4–1	Eintracht Braunschweig	Bökelbergstadion, Mönchengladbach
15:30 CET	Sieloff 37'; Wittkamp 54', 83'; Wimmer 87'	Report	Gersdorff 68'	Attendance: 8,000; Referee: Max Klauser (Vaterstetten)

23 June 1972 33	Rot-Weiß Oberhausen	0–4	Borussia Mönchengladbach	Niederrheinstadion, Oberhausen
20:00 CET		Report	5' Heynckes; 40' Wittkamp; 69' Wimmer; 87' (rig) Netzer	Attendance: 8,000; Referee: Karl-Heinz Fork (Unna-Massen)

28 June 1972 34	Borussia Mönchengladbach	2–2	Werder Bremen	Bökelbergstadion, Mönchengladbach
15:30 CET	Heynckes 2'; Wittkamp 35'	Report	Dietrich 50'; Weist 59'	Attendance: 9,000; Referee: Rudolf Schröck (Riegelsberg)

=== DFB-Pokal ===
==== First Round ====
5 December 1971 First leg	Bayer 04 Leverkusen	0–3	Borussia Mönchengladbach	Ulrich-Haberland-Stadion, Leverkusen
CET		Report	Sieloff 17' (pen.); Wimmer 41'; Fevre 80'	Attendance: 7,000; Referee: Wilfried Hilker (Bochum)

14 December 1971 Second leg	Borussia Mönchengladbach	4–2	Bayer 04 Leverkusen	Bökelbergstadion, Mönchengladbach
CET	Wimmer 10'; Wittkamp 32'; Danner 34'; Sieloff 48'	Report	Surau 57' (o.g.); Strelczyk 82'	Attendance: 5,000; Referee: Hans Georg Merboth (Schiffweiler)

==== Round of 16 ====
13 February 1972 First leg	Borussia Mönchengladbach	4–2	Eintracht Frankfurt	Bökelbergstadion, Mönchengladbach
CET	Fevre 16'; Bonhof 62'; Wittkamp 69'; Nickel 75' (aut)	Report	Nickel 47'; Konca 49'	Attendance: 6,000; Referee: Ferdinand Biwersi (Bliesransbach)

22 February 1972 Second leg	Eintracht Frankfurt	3–2	Borussia Mönchengladbach	Waldstadion, Frankfurt
CET	Weidle 31'; Grabowski 61'; Hölzenbein 75'	Report	Heynckes 35'; Netzer 81'	Attendance: 37,000; Referee: Jan Redelfs (Hannover)

==== Quarter finals ====
1 April 1972 First leg	Borussia Mönchengladbach	2–2	FC Schalke 04	Bökelbergstadion, Mönchengladbach
CET	Fevre 72'; Heynckes 76' (pen.)	Report	Fischer 11', 48'	Attendance: 25,000; Referee: Klaus Ohmsen (Hamburg)

5 April 1972 Second leg	FC Schalke 04	1–0	Borussia Mönchengladbach	Glückauf-Kampfbahn, Gelsenkirchen
CET	Scheer 88'	Report		Attendance: 33,000; Referee: Rudolf Frickel (Munich)

=== European Cup ===
==== First leg ====
15 September 1971 First round	Cork Hibernians (Republic of Ireland)	0–5	(West Germany) Borussia Mönchengladbach	Flower Lodge, Cork
		Report	Wloka 5', 30'; Heynckes 19'; Le Fevre 32', 39'	Attendance: 8,513; Referee: Robert Schaut (Belgium)

29 September 1971 Second leg	Borussia Mönchengladbach (West Germany)	2–1	(Republic of Ireland) Cork Hibernians	Bökelbergstadion, Mönchengladbach
	Sieloff 60'; Wimmer 82'	Report	Dennehy 32'	Attendance: 9,098; Referee: Josef Krnavek (Czechoslovakia)

Borussia Mönchengladbach won 7–1 on aggregate.

==== Second Round ====
20 October 1971 First leg	Borussia Mönchengladbach (West Germany)	7–1	(Italy) Inter Milan	Bökelbergstadion, Mönchengladbach
	Heynckes 7', 44'; Le Fevre 21', 34'; Netzer 42', 52'; Sieloff 83' (pen.)	Report	Boninsegna 20'	Attendance: 27,500; Referee: Jef Dorpmans (Netherlands)

3 November 1971 First round - replay	Inter Milan (Italy)	4–2	(West Germany) Borussia Mönchengladbach	San Siro, Milan
	Bellugi 10'; Boninsegna 13'; Jair 57'; Ghio 90'	Report	Le Fevre 38'; Wittkamp 89'	Attendance: 57,413; Referee: Rudolf Scheurer (Switzerland)

1 December 1971 Second leg	Borussia Mönchengladbach (West Germany)	0–0	(Italy) Inter Milan	Olympiastadion, West Berlin
		Report		Attendance: 84,561; Referee: Jack Taylor (England)

Inter Milan won 4–2 on aggregate.
