= 1977 European Cup final =

European Cup final (1977)

- Match programme cover
- Event: 1976–77 European Cup
Borussia Mönchengladbach	Liverpool
(West Germany)	(England)
1	3
- Date: 25 May 1977
- Venue: Stadio Olimpico, Rome
- Referee: Robert Wurtz (France)
- Attendance: 52,078

The 1977 European Cup final was an association football match played between Borussia Mönchengladbach of West Germany and Liverpool of England on 25 May 1977 at the Stadio Olimpico in Rome, Italy (the venue was decided in Bern by the UEFA Executive Committee on 17 September 1976). The showpiece event was the final match of the 1976–77 season of Europe's premier cup competition, the European Cup. Both teams were appearing in their first European Cup final, although the two sides had previously met in the 1973 UEFA Cup final, which Liverpool won 3–2 on aggregate over two legs.

Each club needed to progress through four rounds to reach the final. Matches were contested over two legs, with a match at each team's home ground. Borussia Mönchengladbach's route to the final was difficult; all but one of their ties were won by a margin of just one goal. Liverpool's victories varied from close affairs to comfortable victories. They beat the previous season's runners-up Saint-Étienne by a single goal over two legs, while they defeated FC Zürich 6–1 on aggregate in the semi-final.

Watched by a crowd of 52,078, Liverpool took an early lead through Terry McDermott, but Allan Simonsen equalised for Mönchengladbach early in the second half. Liverpool regained the lead midway through the second half with a headed goal from Tommy Smith. A penalty by Phil Neal ensured Liverpool won the match 3–1 to secure their first European Cup. The victory was a year after they had won the UEFA Cup, which meant that Bob Paisley became the first manager to win the UEFA Cup and European Cup in successive seasons.

== Route to the final ==
=== Borussia Mönchengladbach ===
Round	Opposition	First leg	Second leg	Aggregate score
1st	Austria Wien	0–1 (a)	3–0 (h)	3–1
2nd	Torino	2–1 (a)	0–0 (h)	2–1
Quarter-final	Club Brugge	2–2 (h)	1–0 (a)	3–2
Semi-final	Dynamo Kyiv	0–1 (a)	2–0 (h)	2–1

Mönchengladbach gained entry to the competition as a result of winning the 1975–76 Bundesliga. Their opposition in the first round were Austrian champions Austria Wien. The away leg at the Franz Horr Stadium in Vienna ended in a 1–0 defeat for Gladbach, but the return leg at the Bökelbergstadion saw the German side win 3–0 courtesy of goals from Uli Stielike, Rainer Bonhof and Jupp Heynckes. A 3–1 aggregate victory meant they would face Italian champions Torino in the second round. Borussia won the first leg away from home at the Stadio Olimpico Grande Torino, 2–1. The second leg finished 0–0, which was enough for them to progress to the quarter-finals courtesy of a 2–1 aggregate victory.

Gladbach's opposition in the quarter-finals were Belgian champions Club Brugge. The first leg at the Bökelbergstadion saw Borussia concede two goals in the first half. However, they scored two goals in the second half courtesy of Christian Kulik and Allan Simonsen to secure a 2–2 draw. Despite this, Club Brugge had the advantage due to them having two away goals. The German side knew they had to score in the second leg at the Jan Breydel Stadium in Bruges to have any chance of progressing to the semi-finals. The first half was goalless, and with six minutes of the second half remaining, Wilfried Hannes scored the goal Borussia needed. The match finished 1–0, and a 3–2 aggregate victory meant they progressed to the semi-finals. Their opposition were Soviet champions Dynamo Kyiv. The first leg at the Central Stadium was won 1–0 by the hosts Dynamo, so Gladbach again needed to score in the return leg to stay in the competition. Midway through the second half, Rainer Bonhof scored to make the tie 1–1 on aggregate. With eight minutes remaining and the tie heading for extra time, Hans-Jürgen Wittkamp scored to give Borussia a two-goal lead. The score remained the same, and Mönchengladbach progressed to their first European Cup final with a 2–1 aggregate victory.

=== Liverpool ===
Round	Opposition	First leg	Second leg	Aggregate score
1st	Crusaders	2–0 (h)	5–0 (a)	7–0
2nd	Trabzonspor	0–1 (a)	3–0 (h)	3–1
Quarter-final	Saint-Étienne	0–1 (a)	3–1 (h)	3–2
Semi-final	Zürich	3–1 (a)	3–0 (h)	6–1

Liverpool were the reigning UEFA Cup champions, having beaten Belgian team Club Brugge 4–3 on aggregate to win the 1975–76 UEFA Cup. Liverpool entered the competition as English champions having won the 1975–76 Football League First Division. They were drawn against minnows Crusaders, the Northern Irish champions, in the first round. The first leg was a home tie at Anfield, which Liverpool won 2–0 courtesy of a Phil Neal penalty and a John Toshack goal. The second leg away at Seaview, was won 5–0 by Liverpool. However, four of their goals were scored within nine minutes of the end of the match, making the scoreline seem more one-sided than the match actually was. Liverpool won the tie 7–0 and were drawn against Turkish champions Trabzonspor in the second round. The first leg was played in Trabzon at Hüseyin Avni Aker Stadium. The Reds failed to avoid defeat there when the Turkish side were awarded a penalty midway through the second half, which they converted to run out 1–0 winners. But Liverpool recovered in the second leg at Anfield. Three goals early in the first half meant they won the match 3–0 to win the tie 3–1 on aggregate and progress to the quarter-finals.

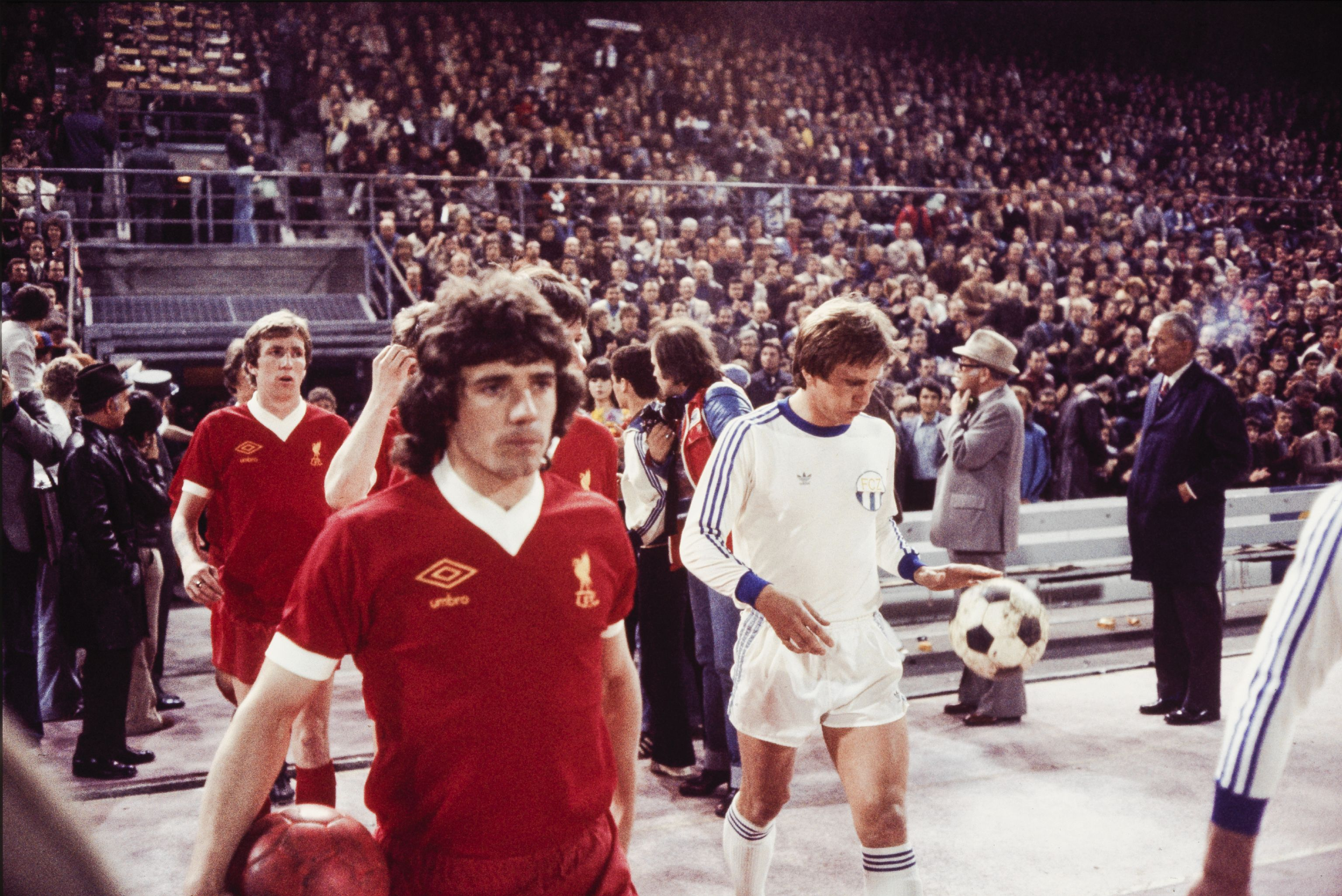
Liverpool and FC Zurich players walking out before their first leg match in the semi-final

Liverpool's opponents in the quarter-finals were the previous year's beaten finalists, Saint-Étienne of France. The first leg was at the Stade Geoffroy-Guichard. As in the previous round, Liverpool lost the away leg 1–0. The return leg at Anfield is considered one of Liverpool's most memorable European matches. Liverpool scored in the second minute of the match through Kevin Keegan to level the tie. Early in the second half Saint-Étienne equalised through Dominique Bathenay. The goal meant that the tie was 2–1 in the French team's favour and due to the away goals rule, Liverpool needed to score two goals to progress to the semi-finals. Liverpool scored again midway through the second half to make the score 2–2 on aggregate. With 18 minutes remaining, David Fairclough replaced John Toshack. After 12 minutes on the pitch, the "supersub" had struck again. Liverpool went on to win the match 3–1 and the tie 3–2 to progress to the semi-finals. The Reds' opponents there were Swiss champions FC Zürich. The first leg at the Letzigrund was won 3–1 by Liverpool, after they had initially gone a goal behind. Liverpool won the second leg at Anfield 3–0 to win the tie 6–1 on aggregate and ensure their participation in the final.

== Match ==
=== Summary ===
The 1977 final was the first appearance in the showpiece match for both Mönchengladbach and Liverpool. The clubs had faced each other before in the final of another European competition: the two-legged 1973 UEFA Cup final, which Liverpool won 3–2 on aggregate. Despite this being both clubs' first European Cup final they had both won European competitions. In addition to their UEFA Cup victory over Mönchengladbach, Liverpool had won the previous season's UEFA Cup, beating Club Brugge 4–3 on aggregate. Borussia were successful in the 1974–75 UEFA Cup; they beat FC Twente of the Netherlands 5–1 on aggregate.

Borussia were aiming to become the second German team to win the European Cup after Bayern Munich had won the three previous finals. Liverpool entered the match having just been crowned English champions again; they won the 1976–77 Football League for a then-record tenth time by a single point over Manchester City and Ipswich Town. Liverpool had also progressed to the final of the 1976–77 FA Cup against Manchester United, giving them the opportunity to win an unprecedented treble of League, FA Cup and European Cup. However, it was not to be as Liverpool lost the FA Cup final 2–1. Borussia entered the match as German champions; they had won the 1976–77 Bundesliga by a single point from Schalke and Eintracht Braunschweig.

The first chance of the match fell to Gladbach; Rainer Bonhof saw his shot come back off the post. In the 24th minute, Borussia player Herbert Wimmer suffered an injury and had to be replaced by Christian Kulik. Three minutes later Ian Callaghan won the ball in midfield and passed to Steve Heighway on the right wing. Heighway cut inside from a wing and passed into space for Terry McDermott who scored the opening goal of the match. Borussia began to exert more of an influence on the game after Liverpool's goal, however they were unable to equalise before the end of the first half.

Seven minutes after the restart, the Germans equalised. A stray Jimmy Case pass was picked up by Allan Simonsen, who advanced towards goal and scored to level the match at 1–1. Moments later, Liverpool thought they had won a penalty when Kevin Keegan seemed to have been brought down by Berti Vogts; however, the referee waved play on. Five minutes after their goal, Simonsen crossed the ball from the wing, it was met by Uli Stielike whose shot was saved by Liverpool goalkeeper Ray Clemence. Two minutes later Liverpool regained the lead. They won a corner on the left side of the pitch and Heighway delivered the ball into the penalty area. It was met at the near post by Tommy Smith whose header gave Liverpool a 2–1 lead in what was his 600th appearance for the club. Soon afterwards, Bonhof appeared to have brought Heighway down in the penalty area, but the referee again waved play on. However, in the 82nd minute Liverpool were awarded a penalty when Vogts again brought Keegan down. Phil Neal scored the penalty to give the Reds a 3–1 lead. No further goals were scored and Liverpool won their first European Cup.

Liverpool's entire 1976-77 European Cup campaign was the subject of a theatre show, Under a Rome Red Sky, at the Epstein Theatre, Liverpool, on November 16, 2026. The cast included Jimmy Case, Phil Thompson, David Fairclough, and Sammy Lee, and a video contribution from Berti Vogts.

=== Details ===
25 May 1977
20:15 CEST

Borussia Mönchengladbach (West Germany)	1–3	(England) Liverpool
Simonsen 51'	Report	McDermott 28'; Smith 65'; Neal 83' (pen.)

Stadio Olimpico, Rome
Attendance: 52,078
Referee: Robert Wurtz (France)

Borussia Mönchengladbach	Liverpool

GK	1	(West Germany) Wolfgang Kneib
DF	2	(West Germany) Berti Vogts (c)
DF	3	(West Germany) Hans Klinkhammer
DF	4	(West Germany) Hans-Jürgen Wittkamp
MF	5	(West Germany) Rainer Bonhof
MF	6	(West Germany) Horst Wohlers		(substituted off) 79'
FW	7	(Denmark) Allan Simonsen
MF	8	(West Germany) Herbert Wimmer		(substituted off) 24'
MF	9	(West Germany) Uli Stielike	(yellow card) 86'
DF	10	(West Germany) Frank Schäffer
FW	11	(West Germany) Jupp Heynckes
Substitutes:
MF	12	(West Germany) Christian Kulik		(substituted on) 24'
MF	15	(West Germany) Wilfried Hannes		(substituted on) 79'
Manager:
(West Germany) Udo Lattek

GK	1	(England) Ray Clemence
DF	2	(England) Phil Neal
DF	3	(Wales) Joey Jones
DF	4	(England) Tommy Smith
MF	5	(England) Ray Kennedy
DF	6	(England) Emlyn Hughes (c)
FW	7	(England) Kevin Keegan
MF	8	(England) Jimmy Case
FW	9	(Republic of Ireland) Steve Heighway
MF	10	(England) Ian Callaghan
MF	11	(England) Terry McDermott
Substitutes:
FW	12	(England) David Fairclough
GK	13	(England) Peter McDonnell
FW	14	(England) David Johnson
FW	15	(England) Alan Waddle
DF	16	(England) Alec Lindsay
Manager:
(England) Bob Paisley

== See also ==
- 1973 UEFA Cup final – contested between same teams
- 1976–77 Liverpool F.C. season
- 1977 European Cup Winners' Cup final
- 1977 European Super Cup
- 1977 UEFA Cup final
- Liverpool F.C. in international football

== Bibliography ==
- Graham, Matthew (1985). Liverpool. Hamlyn Publishing Group. ISBN 0-600-50254-6.
- Hale, Steve; Ponting, Ivan (1992). Liverpool in Europe. London: Guinness Publishing. ISBN 0-85112-569-7.
- Kelly, Stephen F. (1988). You'll Never Walk Alone. London: Queen Anne Press. ISBN 0-356-19594-5.
- Liversedge, Stan (1991). Liverpool: The Official Centenary History. London: Hamlyn Publishing Group. ISBN 0-600-57308-7.
- Wilson, Jonathan (2008). Inverting the Pyramid: The History of Football Tactics. Orion. ISBN 978-1-4091-0204-5.
