= Klinkhammer (surname) =

Klinkhammer is a German occupational surname for a blacksmith. Notable people with this name include:

- Hans Klinkhammer (born 1953), retired German football player
- Rob Klinkhammer (born 1986), Canadian former professional ice hockey left winger
