= 1975–76 Bundesliga =

13th season of the Bundesliga

Bundesliga
- Season: 1975–76
- Dates: 9 August 1975 – 12 June 1976
- Champions: Borussia Mönchengladbach; 4th Bundesliga title 4th German title
- Relegated: Hannover 96; Kickers Offenbach; Bayer 05 Uerdingen
- European Cup: Borussia Mönchengladbach; FC Bayern Munich (title holders)
- Cup Winners' Cup: Hamburger SV
- UEFA Cup: 1. FC Köln; Eintracht Braunschweig; FC Schalke 04; 1. FC Kaiserslautern (losing DFB-Pokal finalists to Hamburg)
- Goals: 1,009
- Average goals/game: 3.3
- Top goalscorer: Klaus Fischer (29)
- Biggest home win: Frankfurt 6–0 Bochum (8 November 1975); Frankfurt 6–0 FC Bayern (22 November 1975)
- Biggest away win: Uerdingen 0–5 Frankfurt (7 February 1976)
- Highest scoring: FC Bayern 7–4 Hertha BSC (11 goals) (12 June 1976)

The 1975–76 Bundesliga was the 13th season of the Bundesliga, West Germany's premier football league. It began on 9 August 1975 and ended on 12 June 1976. Borussia Mönchengladbach were the defending champions.

== Competition modus ==
Every team played two games against each other team, one at home and one away. Teams received two points for a win and one point for a draw. If two or more teams were tied on points, places were determined by goal difference and, if still tied, by goals scored. The team with the most points were crowned champions while the three teams with the fewest points were relegated to their respective 2. Bundesliga divisions.

== Team changes to 1974–75 ==
VfB Stuttgart, Tennis Borussia Berlin and Wuppertaler SV were relegated to the 2. Bundesliga after finishing in the last three places. They were replaced by Hannover 96, winners of the 2. Bundesliga Northern Division, Karlsruher SC, winners of the Southern Division and Bayer 05 Uerdingen, who won a two-legged promotion play-off against FK Pirmasens.

== Team overview ==
Location of teams in Bundesliga 1975–76

Club	Location	Ground	Capacity
Hertha BSC Berlin	Berlin	Olympiastadion	100,000
VfL Bochum	Bochum	Stadion an der Castroper Straße^{1}	40,000
Eintracht Braunschweig	Braunschweig	Eintracht-Stadion	38,000
SV Werder Bremen	Bremen	Weserstadion	32,000
MSV Duisburg	Duisburg	Wedaustadion	38,500
Fortuna Düsseldorf	Düsseldorf	Rheinstadion	59,600
Rot-Weiß Essen	Essen	Georg-Melches-Stadion	40,000
Eintracht Frankfurt	Frankfurt	Waldstadion	62,000
Hamburger SV	Hamburg	Volksparkstadion	80,000
Hannover 96	Hanover	Niedersachsenstadion	60,400
1. FC Kaiserslautern	Kaiserslautern	Stadion Betzenberg	42,000
Karlsruher SC	Karlsruhe	Wildparkstadion	50,000
1. FC Köln	Cologne	Müngersdorfer Stadion	61,000
Borussia Mönchengladbach	Mönchengladbach	Bökelbergstadion	34,500
FC Bayern Munich	Munich	Olympiastadion	70,000
Kickers Offenbach	Offenbach am Main	Bieberer Berg	30,000
FC Schalke 04	Gelsenkirchen	Parkstadion	70,000
Bayer 05 Uerdingen	Krefeld	Grotenburg-Kampfbahn	22,000

Notes

1. The VfL Bochum played six of their 1976 home games at Stadion am Schloss Strünkede in Herne and one at the Westfalenstadion in Dortmund because the field at their Stadion an der Castroper Straße had become unplayable due to the 1976–1979 expansion of the stadium.

== League table ==
Pos	Team	Pld	W	D	L	GF	GA	GD	Pts	Qualification or relegation
1	Borussia Mönchengladbach (C)	34	16	13	5	66	37	+29	45	Qualification to European Cup first round (Note: Bayern Munich won the 1975–76 European Cup and thereby automatically qualified as defending champions. As a consequence, their original UEFA Cup spot earned through league placement was transferred to sixth-placed Schalke 04.)
2	Hamburger SV	34	17	7	10	59	32	+27	41	Qualification to Cup Winners' Cup first round
3	Bayern Munich	34	15	10	9	72	50	+22	40	Qualification to European Cup first round
4	1. FC Köln	34	14	11	9	62	45	+17	39	Qualification to UEFA Cup first round (Note: As Hamburger SV qualified for the Cup Winners' Cup, their UEFA Cup spot was transferred to DFB-Pokal runners-up 1. FC Kaiserslautern.)
5	Eintracht Braunschweig	34	14	11	9	52	48	+4	39	Qualification to UEFA Cup first round
6	Schalke 04	34	13	11	10	76	55	+21	37	Qualification to UEFA Cup first round
7	1. FC Kaiserslautern	34	15	7	12	66	60	+6	37	Qualification to UEFA Cup first round
8	Rot-Weiss Essen	34	13	11	10	61	67	−6	37	
9	Eintracht Frankfurt	34	13	10	11	79	58	+21	36	
10	MSV Duisburg	34	13	7	14	55	62	−7	33	
11	Hertha BSC	34	11	10	13	59	61	−2	32	
12	Fortuna Düsseldorf	34	10	10	14	47	57	−10	30	
13	Werder Bremen	34	11	8	15	44	55	−11	30	
14	VfL Bochum	34	12	6	16	49	62	−13	30	
15	Karlsruher SC	34	12	6	16	46	59	−13	30	
16	Hannover 96 (R)	34	9	9	16	48	60	−12	27	Relegation to 2. Bundesliga
17	Kickers Offenbach (R)	34	9	9	16	40	72	−32	27	Relegation to 2. Bundesliga
18	Bayer 05 Uerdingen (R)	34	6	10	18	28	69	−41	22	Relegation to 2. Bundesliga

Source: www.dfb.de
Rules for classification: 1) points; 2) goal difference; 3) number of goals scored.
(C) Champions; (R) Relegated

== Results ==
Home \ Away	BSC	BOC	EBS	SVW	DUI	F95	RWE	SGE	HSV	H96	FCK	KSC	KOE	BMG	FCB	KOF	S04	B05
Hertha BSC	—	4–1	1–0	0–0	1–2	2–2	2–2	4–4	1–1	1–0	3–0	1–1	2–1	3–0	2–1	1–0	2–1	5–0
VfL Bochum	2–0	—	2–0	0–3	1–2	0–1	2–1	5–3	0–3	2–0	2–0	4–2	1–0	2–0	3–1	5–1	1–4	3–0
Eintracht Braunschweig	5–2	1–1	—	3–2	3–1	3–1	1–1	2–0	1–0	3–2	2–0	2–0	0–0	0–0	1–1	5–1	4–1	1–0
Werder Bremen	3–2	4–1	0–1	—	2–0	3–0	3–3	1–2	1–3	0–0	3–2	1–0	3–2	2–2	0–0	3–1	1–1	3–0
MSV Duisburg	2–1	1–1	1–0	2–0	—	2–2	4–0	1–1	1–1	4–3	1–2	1–0	0–4	2–3	1–1	6–2	1–3	2–0
Fortuna Düsseldorf	2–1	3–1	3–3	3–0	1–3	—	5–2	1–1	1–0	3–0	5–1	0–2	0–0	1–1	1–1	0–0	1–2	2–0
Rot-Weiss Essen	3–1	1–0	2–2	2–0	5–2	2–2	—	4–3	1–1	1–0	5–1	1–0	2–3	1–3	3–3	2–2	0–0	2–1
Eintracht Frankfurt	1–1	6–0	6–1	2–0	1–1	5–2	1–3	—	1–0	5–1	1–1	0–2	2–2	1–1	6–0	1–0	2–1	3–1
Hamburger SV	2–1	5–3	4–0	1–2	3–0	3–1	4–1	4–2	—	3–0	2–0	3–0	2–1	0–0	0–1	2–0	4–1	0–0
Hannover 96	2–6	4–1	2–0	0–0	0–2	1–2	0–0	3–2	1–0	—	2–0	2–0	3–3	3–3	2–2	4–0	1–1	3–1
1. FC Kaiserslautern	5–0	2–1	3–1	4–0	3–0	2–1	5–0	3–1	2–0	2–2	—	3–1	1–1	0–3	2–1	2–2	1–3	1–2
Karlsruher SC	3–0	2–2	0–2	2–0	2–2	1–0	1–2	1–0	3–2	3–2	3–5	—	3–1	2–4	1–2	2–1	2–2	1–0
1. FC Köln	2–0	1–0	1–1	1–1	3–2	4–0	3–0	3–3	1–1	2–1	1–1	1–3	—	0–4	1–0	4–0	2–1	4–0
Borussia Mönchengladbach	1–1	1–1	0–0	3–0	3–0	1–0	1–2	4–2	1–1	2–0	3–0	4–0	2–1	—	4–1	2–0	0–2	6–1
Bayern Munich	7–4	4–0	1–1	4–0	3–0	5–0	5–1	1–1	1–0	3–1	3–4	2–0	1–2	4–0	—	3–1	3–2	2–0
Kickers Offenbach	2–1	1–0	4–2	2–0	2–1	1–1	0–4	2–1	3–2	1–0	1–4	0–0	1–5	1–1	2–2	—	1–1	2–3
Schalke 04	2–2	1–1	5–1	4–2	5–1	2–0	5–1	2–4	0–1	1–2	2–2	6–2	3–1	2–2	2–2	1–1	—	5–1
Bayer Uerdingen	1–1	0–0	0–0	2–1	0–4	2–0	1–1	0–5	0–1	1–1	2–2	1–1	1–1	1–1	2–1	1–2	3–2	—

Source: DFB
Legend: Blue = home team win; Yellow = draw; Red = away team win.

== Top goalscorers ==
29 goals

- (Germany) Klaus Fischer (FC Schalke 04)

23 goals

- (Germany) Erich Beer (Hertha BSC)
- (Germany) Gerd Müller (FC Bayern Munich)

22 goals

- (Germany) Klaus Toppmöller (1. FC Kaiserslautern)

18 goals

- (Germany) Horst Hrubesch (Rot-Weiss Essen)

17 goals

- (Sweden) Roland Sandberg (1. FC Kaiserslautern)

16 goals

- (Germany) Wolfgang Frank (Eintracht Braunschweig)
- (Germany) Bernd Hölzenbein (Eintracht Frankfurt)
- (Denmark) Allan Simonsen (Borussia Mönchengladbach)

15 goals

- (Germany) Hannes Löhr (1. FC Köln)
- (Germany) Bernd Nickel (Eintracht Frankfurt)

== Champion squad ==
Borussia Mönchengladbach
Goalkeeper: Wolfgang Kleff (34).

Defenders: Hans-Jürgen Wittkamp (34 / 5); Berti Vogts (34 / 1); Frank Schäffer (26); Hans Klinkhammer (24 / 2); Ulrich Surau (3).
Midfielders: Herbert Wimmer (34 / 3); Dietmar Danner (34 / 2); Uli Stielike (33 / 4); Rainer Bonhof (30 / 5); Horst Köppel (16); Wilfried Hannes (9 / 1); Christian Kulik (4); Horst Wohlers (2); Norbert Ringels (1).
Forwards: Allan Simonsen (Denmark) (34 / 16); Henning Jensen (Denmark) (33 / 11); Jupp Heynckes (24 / 12); Karl Del'Haye (2).
(league appearances and goals listed in brackets)

Manager: Udo Lattek.

On the roster but have not played in a league game: Hans-Jakob Klingen; Norbert Kox; Hans-Jürgen Offermanns; Gerd Engels; Roger Roebben.

== See also ==
- 1975–76 2. Bundesliga
- 1975–76 DFB-Pokal
