= Egon Schmitt =

German footballer

Personal information
- Date of birth: 12 November 1948 (age 77)
- Place of birth: Mühlheim am Main, Germany
- Height: 1.77 m (5 ft 10 in)
- Position: Defender

Senior career*
Years	Team	Apps	(Gls)
1967–1973	Kickers Offenbach		
1973–1982	1. FC Saarbrücken		

International career
- West Germany
- * Club domestic league appearances and goals

Egon Schmitt (born 12 November 1948) is a German former footballer who played as a defender. He competed for West Germany in the men's tournament at the 1972 Summer Olympics.
