= Fred Hesse =

German footballer (1942–2021)

- Hesse in the 1975–75 season

Personal information
- Full name: Fred Hesse
- Date of birth: 19 October 1942
- Place of birth: Düsseldorf, Gau Düsseldorf, Germany
- Date of death: 19 October 2021 (aged 70)
- Place of death: Kaarst, North Rhine-Westphalia, Germany
- Position: Defender

Youth career
- 1970–1971: VfB Stuttgart

Senior career*
Years	Team	Apps	(Gls)
???–1966	Alemannia 08 Düsseldorf		
1966–1977	Fortuna Düsseldorf	297	(16)
- * Club domestic league appearances and goals

Fred Hesse (19 October 1942 – 19 October 2021) was a German footballer. He played as a defender for Fortuna Düsseldorf throughout the 1970s, playing in several seasons of the Bundesliga.

== Career ==
Fred Hesse first played for Alemannia 08 Düsseldorf, where he played as a left half-forward. He did his military service as a radio operator in Buxtehude and during this time, he played for Buxtehuder SV, with whom he was promoted to the Landesliga Hamburg in 1963 and played there in the 1963–64 season whilst his membership with Alemannia 08 Düsseldorf was suspended, to which he returned after military service. In 1966, he was signed by the then Regionalliga club Fortuna Düsseldorf and was banned until September 1966 for violating the amateur statutes.

From 1966 to 1977 he played as a professional football player for Fortuna Düsseldorf in the Bundesliga and the Regionalliga West and scored ten goals for Fortuna Düsseldorf in 176 Bundesliga matches as a defender.

He made his debut in September 1966 on the third matchday of the 1966–67 Bundesliga in a 2–4 defeat against Eintracht Frankfurt. In his first season, he became a regular starter, making 27 appearances as a defender. After the season, Fortuna Düsseldorf was relegated to the second-tier Regionalliga West. In the decisive final match of the 1970–71 Regionalliga West season against VfR Neuss, which ended 3–1 with Hesse scoring the first goal for the club. The win qualified them for the promotion round, where Fortuna Düsseldorf secured promotion back to the Bundesliga as group winners, unbeaten with only two draws.

From the start of the 1971–72 Bundesliga, he was selected as captain. In September 1973, he scored Fortuna Düsseldorf's first European goal in a 1–0 win against Danish club Næstved BK in the first leg of the first round of the 1973–74 UEFA Cup. In April 1976, he suffered a serious ankle injury and, against medical advice, was given pain-relieving injections to play in the remaining seven games of the relegation battle of the 1975–76 Bundesliga before undergoing ankle surgery at the start of the 1976–77 Bundesliga. Due to the after-effects of the injury, he was forced to end his professional career after the 1976–77 season, appearing only in 13 friendlies in his final season.

After his active career as a footballer, he worked as a painter and varnisher for the city of Düsseldorf. He also worked as a youth coach for Fortuna Düsseldorf for more than 15 years. With Fortuna Düsseldorf's U-team, he won the Niederrheinliga championship in the 1992–93 German U19 Football Championship and reached the finals of the German championship for the last time, but was eliminated in the first round by the U-team of VfB Stuttgart, coached by Ralf Rangnick. Fred Hesse was a member of the traditional Fortuna 70 team, founded in 1982.

Hesse was married and lived in Kaarst. He was friends with Heinz Lucas, the former coach of Fortuna Düsseldorf, until his death in 2016. In June 2021, Hesse died at the age of 78 after a long illness.
