= Walter Posner =

German footballer (born 1953)

Personal information
- Date of birth: 22 February 1953 (age 73)
- Height: 1.77 m (5 ft 10 in)
- Position: Defender

Senior career*
Years	Team	Apps	(Gls)
1973–1975	Borussia Mönchengladbach	2	(0)
1975–1984	Bayer Leverkusen	274	(5)
Total		276	(5)
- * Club domestic league appearances and goals

Walter Posner (born 22 February 1953) is a German former professional footballer who played as a defender. He spent seven seasons in the Bundesliga with Borussia Mönchengladbach and Bayer Leverkusen.

== Honours ==
Borussia Mönchengladbach

- UEFA Cup: 1974–75
- Bundesliga: 1974–75
