= Karl-Heinz Handschuh =

German footballer

Personal information
- Date of birth: 30 November 1947 (age 78)
- Place of birth: Reichenbach, Germany
- Height: 1.76 m (5 ft 9 in)
- Positions: Midfielder; striker

Youth career
- VfB Reichenbach

Senior career*
Years	Team	Apps	(Gls)
1966–1974	VfB Stuttgart	185	(64)
1974–1980	Eintracht Braunschweig	173	(22)
Total		358	(86)

International career
1972–1975	West Germany B	2	(0)
- * Club domestic league appearances and goals

Karl-Heinz Handschuh (born 30 November 1947) is a German former professional footballer who played as a midfielder or striker. He spent 14 seasons in the Bundesliga with VfB Stuttgart and Eintracht Braunschweig.

His son Steffen Handschuh appeared for VfB Stuttgart as well.
