= Eckhard Deterding =

German footballer (1948–2024)

- Deterding with Hannover 96

Personal information
- Date of birth: 13 April 1948
- Place of birth: Bremerhaven, Bremen, West Germany
- Date of death: 11 January 2024 (aged 75)
- Place of death: Hanover, Lower Saxony, Germany
- Height: 1.73 m (5 ft 8 in)
- Position: Forward

Senior career*
Years	Team	Apps	(Gls)
1966–1969	TuS Bremerhaven 93	66	(14)
1969–1971	SV Werder Bremen	16	(1)
1971–1972	Olympia Wilhelmshaven	30	(6)
1972–1974	Hannover 96		
1974–1976	Preußen Münster	74	(30)
1976–1977	Bonner SC		
1977–1978	KSV Baunatal		
1978–1979	Hannover 96	25	(2)
- * Club domestic league appearances and goals

Eckhard Deterding (13 April 1948 – 11 January 2024) was a German football player and manager. He played as a forward for various clubs of the Bundesliga and the 2. Bundesliga throughout his career. He was primarily associated with his careers with SV Werder Bremen, Hannover 96 and Preußen Münster throughout the 1970s.

== Career ==
Deterding made his senior debut at 18 years of age with TuS Bremerhaven 93 in the Regionalliga Nord during the 1966–67 Regionalliga as the club would narrowly miss relegation. In his two succeeding seasons with Bremerhaven, the club remained within the middle of the table. After a total of 66 Regionalliga games with 14 goals, he moved to Werder Bremen for the 1969–70 Bundesliga. In his two seasons at Werder, he experienced three coaches in quick succession, Fritz Rebell, Hans Tilkowski and Robert Gebhardt, with whom the club achieved 11th and 10th place at the end of their respective seasons. During his time with Werder Bremen, Deterding was unable to make the starting Xi, playing only 16 matches and scoring once. Following this, Deterding returned to the Regionalliga for the 1971–72 edition with TSR Olympia Wilhelmshaven, where he stayed for a single season, playing in over 30 matches and scoring six goals for the team. He then returned to the Bundesliga, this time with Hannover 96. With Hannover, he played in the top-flight of German football for two seasons. In the 1972–73 Bundesliga, they narrowly missed relegation with 16th place but in the 1973–74 edition, they finished last and were relegated. During this initial career, Deterding would achieve a record statistic for scoring 0.06 goals per game. However, Deterding would leave the club mid-season and played for Preußen Münster in the course of the 1973–74 Regionalliga where he made 21 appearances for the Prussians, scoring 14 goals. In the newly founded 2. Bundesliga, during the 1974–75 and 1975–76 editions, Deterding scored 16 goals in 53 appearances. This was followed by a single season at Bonner SC and an extra season at KSV Baunatal, both within the 2. Bundesliga. In his last professional season during the 1978–79 2. Bundesliga, he led the "running miracle" back to Hannover 96, where he scored two goals in 25 second division games.

== Later life ==
Following his career in football, Deterding worked at the Hanoverian Transport Company.
