= Werner Weist =

German footballer (1949–2019)

Personal information
- Date of birth: 11 March 1949
- Place of birth: Dortmund, Germany
- Date of death: 13 May 2019 (aged 70)
- Height: 1.74 m (5 ft 9 in)
- Position: Striker

Youth career
- SV 08 Dortmund

Senior career*
Years	Team	Apps	(Gls)
1968–1971	Borussia Dortmund	72	(34)
1971–1977	Werder Bremen	145	(53)
1977–1978	Stuttgarter Kickers	10	(1)
Total		227	(88)
- * Club domestic league appearances and goals

Werner Weist (11 March 1949 – 13 May 2019) was a German footballer who played as a striker. He spent nine seasons in the Bundesliga with Borussia Dortmund and SV Werder Bremen. The best result he achieved was fifth place.
