= Bernd Rupp =

German footballer

Personal information
- Date of birth: 24 February 1942 (age 84)
- Place of birth: Burgsolms, Germany
- Height: 1.69 m (5 ft 7 in)
- Position: Striker

Youth career
- –1964: SV Wiesbaden

Senior career*
Years	Team	Apps	(Gls)
1964–1967	Borussia Mönchengladbach	100	(55)
1967–1969	Werder Bremen	58	(23)
1969–1972	1. FC Köln	97	(46)
1972–1974	Borussia Mönchengladbach	53	(19)
Total		308	(143)

International career
1966	West Germany	1	(1)
- * Club domestic league appearances and goals

Bernd Rupp (born 24 February 1942) is a German former professional footballer who played as a striker. He played his only game for West Germany on 12 October 1966, scoring a goal in a 2–0 friendly win against Turkey. He scored 119 goals in the Bundesliga in 274 matches.

== Honours ==
Borussia Mönchengladbach

- UEFA Cup: runners-up 1972–73
- DFB-Pokal: 1972–73
- Bundesliga: runners-up 1973–74
