= Henning Jensen =

Danish footballer (1949–2017)

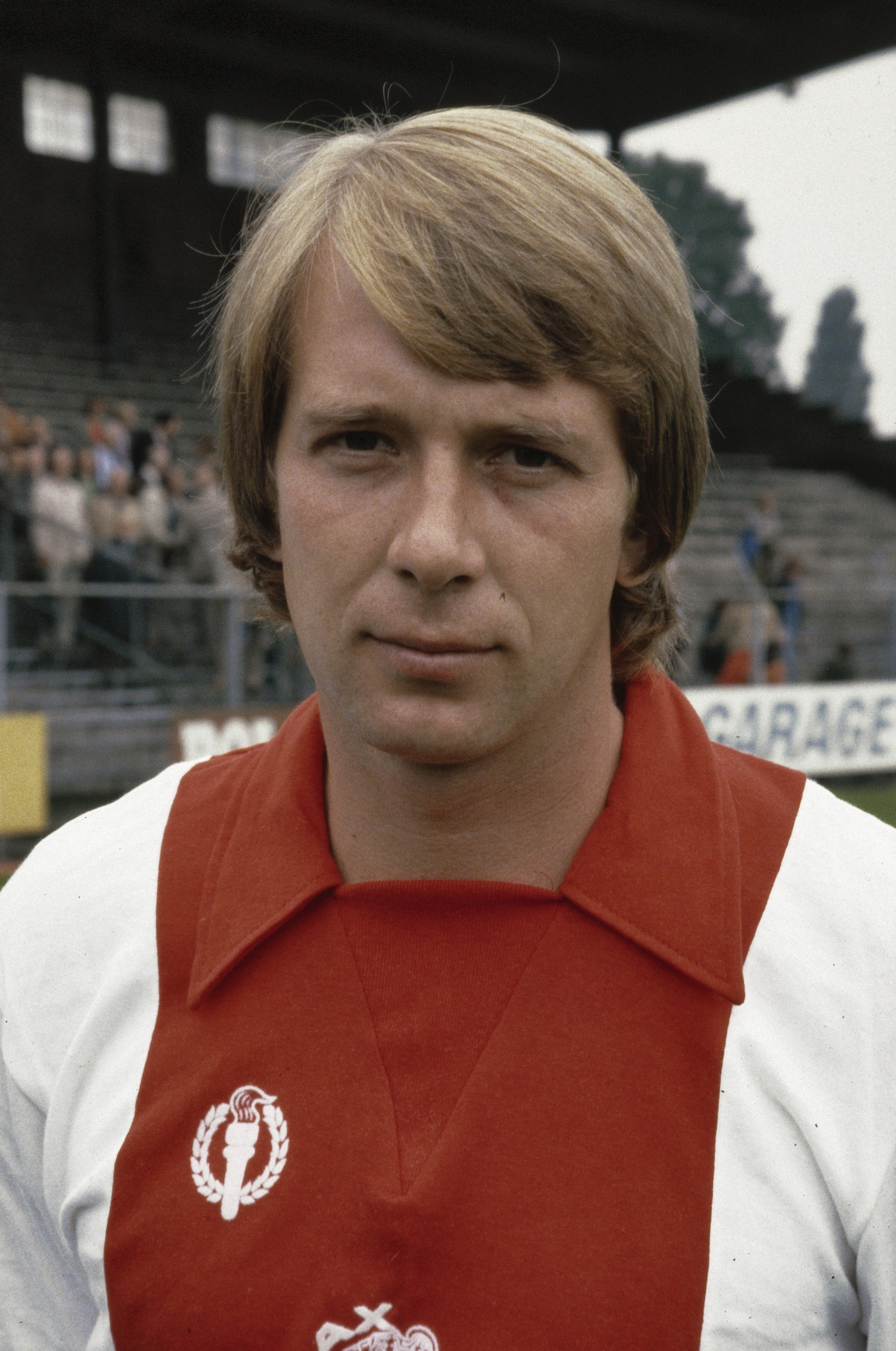
- Jensen playing for Ajax, 1979

Personal information
- Date of birth: 17 August 1949
- Place of birth: Nørresundby, Denmark
- Date of death: 4 December 2017 (aged 68)
- Place of death: Aalborg, Denmark
- Position: Forward

Senior career*
Years	Team	Apps	(Gls)
1965–1972	Nørresundby		
1972–1976	Borussia M'gladbach	125	(44)
1976–1979	Real Madrid	81	(16)
1979–1981	Ajax	56	(7)
1981–1983	AGF	53	(17)
1984	Nørresundby		

International career
1972–1980	Denmark	21	(9)
- * Club domestic league appearances and goals

Henning Jensen (17 August 1949 – 4 December 2017) was a Danish football player who played professionally for German club Borussia Mönchengladbach, Spanish club Real Madrid and Dutch club Ajax Amsterdam where he won the domestic league championship in each country. He scored nine goals in 21 games for the Denmark national team from 1972 to 1980.

== Biography ==
Born in Nørresundby, Jensen started playing football for local team Nørresundby BK in the Denmark Series, the then fourth best division of Danish football. Playing as a right-sided attacker, he made his debut for the Danish national team in May 1972, and scored a goal in the 1972 Summer Olympics qualification match against Romania. Before having ever played a Danish league game, he moved abroad in 1972 as he signed a professional contract with German club Borussia Mönchengladbach.

At Mönchengladbach, he played alongside fellow Danish national team player Allan Simonsen in attack. He won the 1972–73 DFB-Pokal, 1974–75 UEFA Cup, and two Bundesliga championships in his four years at the club. After 44 goals in 125 league games, he earned a lucrative move to defending Spanish La Liga champions Real Madrid in 1976. He played three successful years at Real Madrid, winning the 1977–78 and 1978–79 La Liga championships. In total he played 102 official games for Real Madrid. While in Madrid, he scored the 300th goal in the European competition for the club. He moved to the Netherlands in 1979, to play for defending Dutch Eredivisie champions Ajax Amsterdam of the coaches Cor Brom and Leo Beenhakker. He met in Amsterdam other Danish players like Frank Arnesen and Søren Lerby (and two years later also for a very short period Jesper Olsen). The routined player had to work hard for his position in the team for the first time at the age of 30 years. The midfielder had much rivalry from Frank Arnesen, Dick Schoenaker and Søren Lerby, which trio formed one of the strongest (attacking) midfields of Europe those years. Jensen started as centre forward, when central attacker Ray Clarke was sold. Thereafter he played at the wings, as wing attacker for a period. When Frank Arnesen had been injured a part of the 1979–80 season Jensen moved to the midfield, there playing his best matches for Ajax Amsterdam. In the season 1979–80 he won with Ajax the Dutch Eredivisie league championship and also the semi-finals of the European Cup tournament for champions were reached that season.

He returned to Denmark in July 1981, to play for AGF Aarhus, before he moved back to Nørresundby and played his last games for Nørresundby BK.

In 2006, Henning Jensen was named among the nominees for DBU's "Denmark's All-Time Best Footballer" award, alongside Preben Elkjær, Brian Laudrup, Michael Laudrup, Morten Olsen, Peter Schmeichel, Allan Simonsen and Jon Dahl Tomasson.

He died on 4 December 2017 at the age of 68 in Aalborg after a short illness from cancer.

== Career statistics ==
Appearances and goals by club, season and competition
Club	Season	League			National Cup		League Cup		International		Total	
Club	Season	Division	Apps	Goals	Apps	Goals	Apps	Goals	Apps	Goals	Apps	Goals
Borussia Mönchengladbach	1972–73	Bundesliga	33	11	8	1	8	2	10	7	59	21
Borussia Mönchengladbach	1973–74	Bundesliga	25	9	3	0	–		5	2	42	11
Borussia Mönchengladbach	1974–75	Bundesliga	34	13	2	0	–		11	1	47	14
Borussia Mönchengladbach	1975-76	Bundesliga	33	11	4	2	-		6	1	43	14
Borussia Mönchengladbach	Total	Bundesliga	125	44	17	3	8	2	32	11	175	60

== Honours ==
- DFB-Pokal: 1972–73
- UEFA Cup: 1974–75
- Bundesliga: 1974–75, 1975–76
- Spanish La Liga: 1977–78, 1978–79
- Dutch Eredivisie: 1979–80
