= Heinz Michallik =

German footballer

Personal information
- Date of birth: 21 July 1947 (age 79)
- Place of birth: Hamm, Germany
- Height: 1.75 m (5 ft 9 in)
- Position: Defender

Senior career*
| Years | Team | Apps | (Gls) |
| 1968–1971 | DJK Gütersloh | | |
| 1971–1974 | Borussia Mönchengladbach | 39 | (0) |
| 1974–1978 | FC Augsburg | 114 | (1) |
| 1978–1984 | TSV Neusäß | | |
- * Club domestic league appearances and goals

Heinz Michallik (born 21 July 1947) is a German former professional footballer who played as a defender.

== Career ==
Born in Hamm, Michallik played for DJK Gütersloh, Borussia Mönchengladbach, FC Augsburg and TSV Neusäß.
