= Dietmar Danner =

German footballer

Personal information
- Date of birth: 29 November 1950 (age 75)
- Place of birth: Mannheim, West Germany
- Position: Midfielder

Youth career
- Eintracht Plankstadt

Senior career*
Years	Team	Apps	(Gls)
1969–1971	VfR Mannheim	65	(16)
1971–1980	Borussia Mönchengladbach	179	(27)
1980–1981	FC Schalke 04	19	(0)
1981–1982	1. FC Saarbrücken		
1982–1983	LASK Linz	16	(1)

International career
1973–1976	West Germany	6	(0)
- * Club domestic league appearances and goals

Dietmar Danner (born 29 November 1950) is a German former professional footballer.

== Club career ==
Danner won three German championships and one DFB-Pokal title, as well as two UEFA Cup titles with Borussia Mönchengladbach, with whom he spent the majority of his playing career.

Danner was a part of Mönchengladbach during their golden period playing alongside players like Günter Netzer, Rainer Bonhof, Uli Stielike, Bertie Vogts, Allan Simonsen, Herbert Wimmer and Jupp Heynckes. Danner was an all around player in an adventurous, attacking, side. His career at the club and international level was cut short by an injury in 1976. Danner never regained full fitness and only played 49 more league games, including his final 19 with Schalke 04.

== International career ==
He earned six caps for the West Germany national team from 1973 to 1976. He missed out on being part of the 1974 World Cup winning West German squad but was included for the UEFA Euro 1976.

== Honours ==
- UEFA Euro 1976 runner-up
- European Cup runner-up: 1976–77
- UEFA Cup:1974–75, 1978–79; runner-up: 1972–73, 1979–80
- Bundesliga: 1974–75, 1975–76, 1976–77; runner-up: 1973–74, 1977–78
- DFB-Pokal: 1972–73
