= Hans Klinkhammer =

German footballer

Personal information
- Date of birth: 23 August 1953 (age 73)
- Place of birth: Germany
- Height: 1.84 m (6 ft 1/2 in)
- Position: Full back

Senior career*
| Years | Team | Apps | (Gls) |
| 1972–1980 | Borussia Mönchengladbach | 149 | (2) |
| 1980–1982 | TSV 1860 München | 41 | (3) |
| 1982–1983 | Union Solingen | 17 | (1) |
| Total | | 207 | (6) |

International career
| 1977 | West Germany B | 1 | (0) |
- * Club domestic league appearances and goals

Hans Klinkhammer (born 23 August 1953) is a retired German football player. He spent nine seasons in the Bundesliga with Borussia Mönchengladbach and TSV 1860 München.

== Honours ==
- European Cup finalist: 1976–77
- UEFA Cup winner: 1974–75, 1978–79
- UEFA Cup finalist: 1972–73, 1979–80
- Bundesliga champion: 1974–75, 1975–76, 1976–77
- Bundesliga runner-up: 1973–74, 1977–78
- DFB-Pokal winner: 1972–73
