= Ulrich Surau =

German footballer

Personal information
- Date of birth: 19 August 1952 (age 74)
- Place of birth: Emmerich am Rhein, West Germany
- Positions: Defender; midfielder

Senior career*
Years	Team	Apps	(Gls)
1970–1971	Alemannia Aachen		
1971–1976	Borussia Mönchengladbach	57	(3)
1976	Rot-Weiss Essen	12	(3)
1977	Bonner SC	7	(2)
1977–1979	NEC Nijmegen	35	(5)
Total		111	(13)
- * Club domestic league appearances and goals

Ulrich Surau (born 19 August 1952) is a German former football player. He spent six seasons in the Bundesliga with Borussia Mönchengladbach and Rot-Weiss Essen.

== Honours ==
- UEFA Cup winner: 1975.
- UEFA Cup finalist: 1973.
- Bundesliga champion: 1975, 1976.
- Bundesliga runner-up: 1974.
- DFB-Pokal winner: 1973.
