= Christian Kulik =

German footballer (born 1952)

Personal information
- Date of birth: 6 December 1952 (age 73)
- Place of birth: Zabrze, Poland
- Height: 1.78 m (5 ft 10 in)
- Position: Midfielder

Senior career*
Years	Team	Apps	(Gls)
1970–1971	Alemannia Aachen		
1971–1981	Borussia Mönchengladbach	220	(38)
1981–1982	FC Antwerp	4	(0)
1982–1984	SG Düren 99		
1984–1986	FC Mendrisio-Stabio		
1986	FC Chur		
1986–1988	FSV Salmrohr	14	(1)
- * Club domestic league appearances and goals

Christian Kulik (born 6 December 1952) is a German former professional footballer who played as a midfielder. He spent ten seasons in the Bundesliga with Borussia Mönchengladbach.

== Career ==
Kulik was born in Zabrze, Silesia, Poland. He made 220 Bundesliga appearances for Borussia Mönchengladbach.

He ended his career after a stint with FSV Salmrohr.

== Honours ==
- European Cup finalist: 1976–77
- UEFA Cup: 1974–75, 1978–79; runner-up 1972–73, 1979–80
- Bundesliga: 1974–75, 1975–76, 1976–77; runner-up: 1973–74, 1977–78
- DFB-Pokal: 1972–73
