= Herbert Wimmer =

German footballer (born 1944)

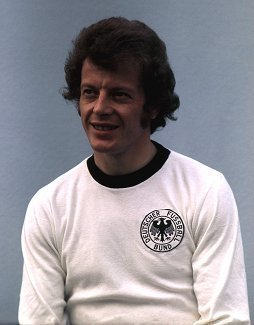
- Wimmer in 1972

Personal information
- Date of birth: 9 November 1944 (age 81)
- Place of birth: Eupen, Belgium
- Height: 1.79 m (5 ft 10 in)
- Position: Midfielder

Youth career
- Borussia Brand

Senior career*
Years	Team	Apps	(Gls)
1966–1978	Borussia Mönchengladbach	366	(51)

International career
1968–1976	West Germany	36	(4)
Medal record
Men's football
Representing West Germany
FIFA World Cup
Winner	1974 West Germany
UEFA European Championship
Winner	1972 Belgium
Runner-up	1976 Yugoslavia
- * Club domestic league appearances and goals

Herbert "Hacki" Wimmer (born 9 November 1944) is a German former professional footballer who played as a midfielder. Besides winning five national championships and two UEFA Cups with his club side Borussia Mönchengladbach, he won the 1974 World Cup and the UEFA Euro 1972 with Germany.

== Club career ==
Wimmer started his playing career with lowly Borussia Brand (a place close to the city of Aachen). Between 1966 and 1978, he played in 366 Bundesliga matches for Borussia Mönchengladbach and scored 51 goals. With the club, he won five national championships (in 1970, 1971, 1975, 1976, and 1977), the German Cup in 1973, and the UEFA Cup in 1975.

Wimmer started out as a forward, but in Mönchengladbach, his role was primarily to cover defensively for the star of the team in this era, midfield playmaker Günter Netzer. His physical endurance, which earned him the nickname the Iron Lung, was one of his major assets. Wimmer was considered as a paragon of a player that never runs out of steam. As such, Jonathan Wilson, when writing for The Guardian in 2013, described him as a "destroyer," which is a type of holding midfielder whose role is mainly to help win back possession and distribute the ball to other players.

== International career ==
Between 1968 and 1976, Wimmer also played in 36 matches for the West Germany national team, where he scored four goals. With West Germany, he won the 1972 European Football Championship – he scored the second goal in the 3–0 win in the final against the USSR – and the 1974 FIFA World Cup, where he took part in two matches.

== Honours ==
Borussia Mönchengladbach

- Bundesliga: 1969–70, 1970–71, 1974–75, 1975–76, 1976–77
- DFB-Pokal: 1972–73
- UEFA Cup: 1974–75; runner-up: 1972–73
- European Cup runner-up: 1976–77

West Germany

- FIFA World Cup: 1974
- UEFA European Championship: 1972; runner-up: 1976

Individual

- UEFA European Championship Team of the Tournament: 1972
- kicker Bundesliga Team of the Season: 1975–76
