= Bökelbergstadion =

Football stadium in Mönchengladbach, Germany

Coordinates: 51°12′32.07″N 6°26′22.40″E

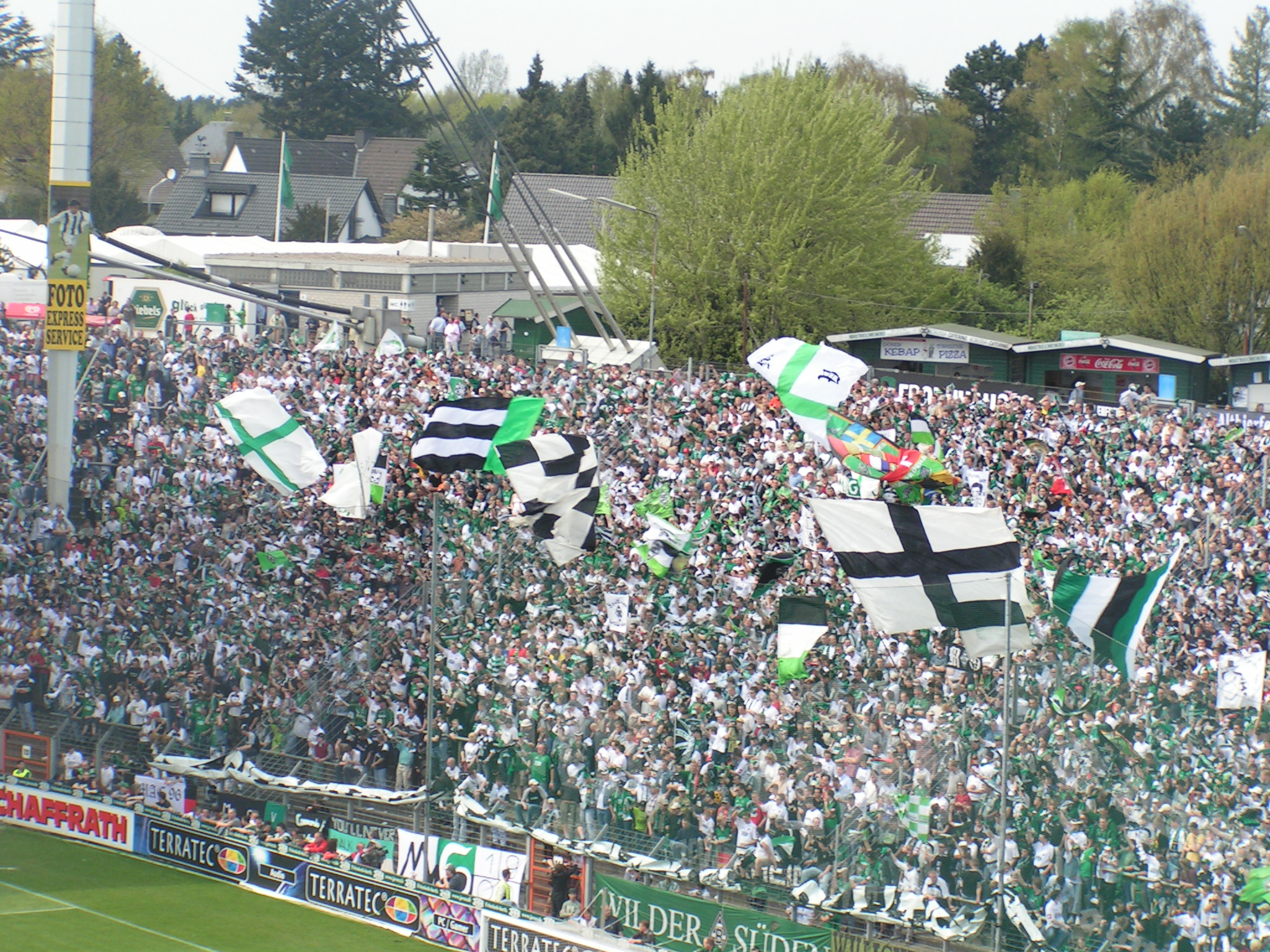
- Bökelbergstadion in April 2004
- Interactive map of Bökelbergstadion
- Location: Mönchengladbach, Germany
- Owner: Stadt Mönchengladbach
- Capacity: 34,500

Construction
- Opened: 20 September 1919
- Renovated: 1960, 1978
- Closed: 2004
- Demolished: 2006

Tenant
- Borussia Mönchengladbach

The Bökelbergstadion (pronounced [ˈbøːkl̩bɛʁkˌʃtaːdi̯ɔn]) was a football stadium in Mönchengladbach, Germany.

== History ==
It was the home of Bundesliga side Borussia Mönchengladbach before Borussia-Park opened in 2004. The stadium had a capacity of up to 34,500 people. The inauguration took place on 20 September 1919 under the name "Westdeutsches Stadion". The site's nickname then, was "de Kull" (the gravel-pit). The name "Bökelbergstadion" was established on 28 July 1962, after Borussia Mönchengladbach won the DFB-Pokal for the first time. The stadium was demolished in August 2006. Construction of new residential buildings went ahead in 2007. The terraces of the former north and south curve as well as those of the main grandstand have been preserved and are now integrated into the surrounding residential area as a public green space. The former stadium structure is still clearly visible. On 2 December 2019 a memorial of the Bökelberg was unveiled on site.
