= 1970–71 Borussia Mönchengladbach season =

Borussia Mönchengladbach
1970–71 season
- Chairman: Helmut Beyer
- Manager: Hennes Weisweiler
- Bundesliga: 1st
- DFB-Pokal: Quarter-finals
- European Cup: Second round
- Top goalscorer: League: Herbert Laumen (20 goals); All: Herbert Laumen (28 goals)
Home colours	Away colours

The 1970–71 Borussia Mönchengladbach season was the 72nd season in the club's history and the 6th in the top-flight of German football. The season began on 15 August 1970 against Kickers Offenbach and finished on 5 June 1971 against Eintracht Frankfurt.

== Season overview ==
In the 1970–71 season, Borussia Mönchengladbach, coached by Hennes Weisweiler, won their second title in the Bundesliga after their success in the 1969–70 Bundesliga. In the 1970–71 DFB-Pokal, Borussia Mönchengladbach was eliminated in the quarterfinals by Fortuna Düsseldorf. In the 1970–71 European Cup, Borussia Mönchengladbach were eliminated in the round of 16 by Everton.

== Squad ==
Note: Flags indicate national team as defined under FIFA eligibility rules; some limited exceptions apply. Players may hold more than one non-FIFA nationality.

No.	Pos.	Nation	Player
—	GK	GER	Wolfgang Kleff
—	GK	GER	Bernd Schrage
—	DF	GER	Werner Adler
—	DF	GER	Berti Vogts
—	DF	GER	Klaus-Dieter Sieloff
—	DF	GER	Rainer Bonhof
—	DF	GER	Ludwig Müller
—	DF	GER	Hans-Jürgen Wittkamp
—	DF	GER	Heinz Wittmann

No.	Pos.	Nation	Player
—	DF	GER	Hartwig Bleidick
—	MF	GER	Herbert Wimmer
—	MF	GER	Peter Dietrich
—	MF	GER	Hans-Jürgen Wloka
—	FW	GER	Jupp Heynckes
—	FW	GER	Günter Netzer
—	FW	DEN	Ulrik le Fevre
—	FW	GER	Horst Köppel

== Transfers ==
=== In ===
Pos.	Player	Transferred from	Fee	Date	Source
DF	(Germany) Werner Adler	(Germany) SV Alsenborn		Summer 1970	
FW	(Germany) Jupp Heynckes	(Germany) Hannover 96		Summer 1970	

=== Out ===
Pos.	Player	Transferred to	Fee	Date	Source
GK	(Germany) Volker Danner	(Germany) MSV Duisburg		Summer 1970	
MF	(Germany) Werner Kaiser	(Germany) 1. FC Saarbrücken		Summer 1970	
MF	(Germany) Heinz Koch	(Germany) VfL Osnabrück		Summer 1970	
FW	(Germany) Peter Kracke	(Germany) 1. FC Saarbrücken		Summer 1970	
FW	(Germany) Peter Meyer	(Germany) VfL Benrath		Summer 1970	
MF	(Germany) Winfried Schäfer	(Germany) Kickers Offenbach		Summer 1970	
MF	(Germany) Erwin Spinnler	(Germany) Kickers Offenbach		Summer 1970	
MF	(Germany) Gerd Zimmermann	(Germany) SC Fortuna Köln		Summer 1970	

== Match results ==
=== Legend ===
Win Draw Loss

=== Bundesliga ===
15 August 1970 1	Borussia Mönchengladbach	2–0	Kickers Offenbach	Bökelbergstadion, Mönchengladbach
15:30 CET	Bonhof 79'; Köppel 87'	Report		Attendance: 25,000; Referee: Horst Herden (Hamburg)

22 August 1970 2	Hamburger SV	2–2	Borussia Mönchengladbach	Volksparkstadion, Hamburg
15:30 CET	Zaczyk 62' (pen.); Seeler 70'	Report	Heynckes 7'; Netzer 30'	Attendance: 42,000; Referee: Heinz Aldinger (Waiblingen)

28 August 1970 3	Borussia Mönchengladbach	0–0	Hannover 96	Bökelbergstadion, Mönchengladbach
20:00 CET		Report		Attendance: 26,000; Referee: Fritz Seiler (Schmiden)

5 September 1970 4	Arminia Bielefeld	0–2	Borussia Mönchengladbach	Bielefelder Alm, Bielefeld
15:30 CET		Report	31' Köppel; 57' Laumen	Attendance: 30,000; Referee: Karl Riegg (Augsburg)

12 September 1970 5	Borussia Mönchengladbach	5–0	1. FC Kaiserslautern	Bökelbergstadion, Mönchengladbach
15:30 CET	Laumen 4', 66'; Köppel 12', 87'; Wimmer 25'	Report		Attendance: 16,000; Referee: Gerhard Schulenburg (Laatzen)

19 September 1970 6	Bayern Munich	2–2	Borussia Mönchengladbach	Munich
15:30 CET	Schwarzenbeck 14'; Müller 74'	Report	Sieloff 64' (pen.); Heynckes 90'	Stadium: Grünwalder Stadion; Attendance: 43,000; Referee: Ferdinand Biwersi (Bliesransbach)

30 September 1970 7	Borussia Mönchengladbach	6–0	Rot-Weiß Oberhausen	Bökelbergstadion, Mönchengladbach
20:00 CET	Netzer 5', 69'; Heynckes 23'; Sieloff 49' (pen.); Müller 53' (rig); Laumen 80'	Report		Attendance: 18,000; Referee: Alfons Betz (Regensburg)

26 September 1970 8	FC Schalke 04	0–0	Borussia Mönchengladbach	Glückauf-Kampfbahn, Gelsenkirchen
15:30 CET		Report		Attendance: 35,000; Referee: Kurt Tschenscher (Mannheim)

3 October 1970 9	Borussia Mönchengladbach	1–1	1. FC Köln	Bökelbergstadion, Mönchengladbach
15:30 CET	Fevre 48'	Report	Rupp 19'	Attendance: 22,000; Referee: Walter Horstmann (Groß Escherde)

7 October 1970 10	Werder Bremen	1–1	Borussia Mönchengladbach	Weserstadion, Bremen
20:00 CET	Zembski 10'	Report	Müller 26'	Attendance: 32,000; Referee: Rudolf Schröck (Riegelsberg)

10 October 1970 11	Borussia Mönchengladbach	3–1	Eintracht Braunschweig	Bökelbergstadion, Mönchengladbach
15:30 CET	Laumen 12', 67'; Heynckes 84'	Report	Merkhoffer 73'	Attendance: 27,000; Referee: Günter Linn (Altendiez)

24 October 1970 12	MSV Duisburg	1–1	Borussia Mönchengladbach	Wedaustadion, Duisburg
15:30 CET	Rettkowski 72'	Report	Heynckes 67'	Attendance: 20,000; Referee: Rudolf Frickel (Munich)

31 October 1970 13	Borussia Mönchengladbach	4–1	VfB Stuttgart	Bökelbergstadion, Mönchengladbach
15:30 CET	Netzer 2', 11'; Eisele 58' (o.g.); Laumen 65'	Report	Handschuh 69'	Attendance: 14,000; Referee: Herbert Lutz (Bremen)

7 November 1970 14	Hertha BSC	4–2	Borussia Mönchengladbach	Olympiastadion, Berlin
15:30 CET	Weber 28'; Steffenhagen 38'; Horr 47'; Varga 88' (pen.)	Report	Laumen 66'; Heynckes 67'	Attendance: 80,000; Referee: Dieter Heckeroth (Frankfurt/Main)

13 November 1970 15	Borussia Mönchengladbach	3–2	Borussia Dortmund	Bökelbergstadion, Mönchengladbach
20:00 CET	Dietrich 17'; Netzer 28'; Köppel 30'	Report	Weinkauff 77', 79'	Attendance: 22,000; Referee: Karl Riegg (Augsburg)

28 November 1970 16	Rot-Weiss Essen	1–2	Borussia Mönchengladbach	Georg-Melches-Stadion, Essen
15:30 CET	Fürhoff 43'	Report	Fevre 52'; Heynckes 66'	Attendance: 33,000; Referee: Kurt Tschenscher (Mannheim)

4 December 1970 17	Borussia Mönchengladbach	5–0	Eintracht Frankfurt	Bökelbergstadion, Mönchengladbach
20:00 CET	Laumen 12', 66'; Heynckes 28', 45'; Dietrich 84'	Report		Attendance: 14,000; Referee: Jan Redelfs (Hannover)

23 January 1971 18	Kickers Offenbach	1–3	Borussia Mönchengladbach	Stadion am Bieberer Berg, Offenbach am Main
15:30 CET	Winkler 73'	Report	Reich 13' (o.g.); Heynckes 49', 70'	Attendance: 23,000; Referee: Ewald Regely (Berlin)

30 January 1971 19	Borussia Mönchengladbach	3–0	Hamburger SV	Bökelbergstadion, Mönchengladbach
15:30 CET	Sieloff 66' (rig); Wimmer 74'; Heynckes 78'	Report		Attendance: 23,000; Referee: Gert Meuser (Ingelheim)

6 February 1971 20	Hannover 96	1–1	Borussia Mönchengladbach	Niedersachsenstadion, Hannover
15:30 CET	Siemensmeyer 42'	Report	Laumen 60'	Attendance: 41,000; Referee: Alfons Betz (Regensburg)

13 February 1971 21	Borussia Mönchengladbach	0–2	Arminia Bielefeld	Bökelbergstadion, Mönchengladbach
15:30 CET		Report	Brei 47'; Wittmann 58' (o.g.)	Attendance: 17,000; Referee: Dieter Berner (Enzberg)

27 February 1971 21	1. FC Kaiserslautern	0–1	Borussia Mönchengladbach	Betzenbergstadion, Kaiserslautern
15:30 CET		Report	Dietrich 35'	Attendance: 31,000; Referee: Heinz Aldinger (Waiblingen)

14 April 1971 23	Borussia Mönchengladbach	3–1	Bayern Munich	Bökelbergstadion, Mönchengladbach
20:00 CET	Netzer 37' le Fevre 56'; Laumen 83'	Report	Mrosko 66'	Attendance: 30,000; Referee: Horst Herden (Hamburg)

28 April 1971 24	Rot-Weiß Oberhausen	0–2	Borussia Mönchengladbach	Niederrheinstadion, Oberhausen
20:00 CET		Report	Laumen 25'; Wimmer 29'	Attendance: 28,000; Referee: Heinz Aldinger (Waiblingen)

20 March 1971 25	Borussia Mönchengladbach	2–0	FC Schalke 04	Bökelbergstadion, Mönchengladbach
15:30 CET	Netzer 13'; Sieloff 26'	Report		Attendance: 30,000; Referee: Fritz Seiler (Schmiden)

27 March 1971 26	1. FC Köln	3–2	Borussia Mönchengladbach	Müngersdorfer Stadion, Cologne
15:30 CET	Weber 9'; Rupp 14', 37'	Report	Heynckes 7'; Köppel 57'	Attendance: 45,000; Referee: Gerhard Schulenburg (Hamburg)

3 April 1971 27	Borussia Mönchengladbach	0–2	Werder Bremen	Bökelbergstadion, Mönchengladbach
15:30 CET	Köppel 7'	Report	Hasebrink 16'	Attendance: 14,000; Referee: Gert Meuser (Ingelheim)

17 April 1971 28	Eintracht Braunschweig	1–1	Borussia Mönchengladbach	Stadion an der Hamburger Straße, Braunschweig
15:30 CET	Ulsaß 26'	Report	Laumen 8'	Attendance: 30,000; Referee: Alfons Betz (Regensburg)

1 May 1971 29	Borussia Mönchengladbach	1–0	MSV Duisburg	Bökelbergstadion, Mönchengladbach
15:30 CET	Sieloff 40' (pen.)	Report		Attendance: 22,000; Referee: Rudolf Schröck (Riegelsberg)

8 May 1971 30	VfB Stuttgart	1–1	Borussia Mönchengladbach	Neckarstadion, Stuttgart
15:30 CET	Handschuh 13'	Report	Laumen 31'	Attendance: 48,000; Referee: Jan Redelfs (Hannover)

14 May 1971 31	Borussia Mönchengladbach	4–0	Hertha BSC	Bökelbergstadion, Mönchengladbach
20:00 CET	Laumen 4', 52'; Köppel 8'; Heynckes 56'	Report		Attendance: 25,000; Referee: Dieter Heckeroth (Frankfurt/Main)

22 May 1971 32	Borussia Dortmund	3–4	Borussia Mönchengladbach	Stadion Rote Erde, Dortmund
15:30 CET	Neuberger 6'; Weinkauff 26'; Ritschel 54'	Report	Laumen 35'; Heynckes 48'; Sieloff 50'; Vogts 56'	Attendance: 30,000; Referee: Karl Riegg (Augsburg)

29 May 1971 33	Borussia Mönchengladbach	4–3	Rot-Weiss Essen	Bökelbergstadion, Mönchengladbach
15:30 CET	Laumen 7', 30'; Heynckes 49', 56'	Report	Erlhoff 21'; Stauvermann 72'; Ferner 83'	Attendance: 24,000; Referee: Alfons Betz (Regensburg)

5 June 1971 34	Eintracht Frankfurt	1–4	Borussia Mönchengladbach	Waldstadion, Frankfurt
15:30 CET	Nickel 45'	Report	Netzer 43'; Köppel 69'; Heynckes 78', 81'	Attendance: 65,000; Referee: Walter Horstmann (Groß Escherde)

=== DFB-Pokal ===
12 December 1970 First round - First leg	SV Alsenborn	1–1	Borussia Mönchengladbach	Stadion an der Kinderlehre, Enkenbach-Alsenborn
CET	Lenz 55'	Report	Netzer 60'	Attendance: 18,000; Referee: Fritz Seiler (Schmiden)

30 December 1970 First round - Second leg	Borussia Mönchengladbach	3–1	SV Alsenborn	Bökelbergstadion, Mönchengladbach
CET	Laumen 28', 85'; Sieloff 56' (pen.)	Report	Nepomucký 58'	Attendance: 9,500; Referee: Karl-Heinz Picker (Hamburg)

20 February 1971 Round of 16	Hertha BSC	1–3	Borussia Mönchengladbach	Olympiastadion, Berlin
CET	Gayer 72'	Report	Dietrich 28'; Köppel 67'; Heynckes 78'	Attendance: 50,000; Referee: Gerhard Schulenburg (Hamburg)

8 April 1971 Quarter-finals	Fortuna Düsseldorf	3–1	Borussia Mönchengladbach	Flinger Broich, Düsseldorf
CET	Begerau 60'; Hoffer 83'; Geye 89'	Report	Laumen 19'	Attendance: 24,000; Referee: Karl Riegg (Augsburg)

=== European Cup ===
==== First Round ====
16 September 1970 First leg	EPA Larnaca (Cyprus)	0–6	(West Germany) Borussia Mönchengladbach	Rosenaustadion, Augsburg
		Report	Laumen 6', 35'; Köppel 28', 48'; Netzer 57'; Heynckes 84'	Attendance: 15,764; Referee: Josef Krňávek (Czechoslovakia)

22 September 1970 Second leg	Borussia Mönchengladbach (West Germany)	10–0	(Cyprus) EPA Larnaca	Bökelbergstadion, Mönchengladbach
	Netzer 19'; Wimmer 30'; Köppel 35', 60'; Dietrich 40'; Sieloff 44' (pen.); Laumen 50', 56'; Heynckes 73'; Vogts 82'	Report		Attendance: 16,059; Referee: Bohumil Smejkal (Czechoslovakia)

Borussia Mönchengladbach won 16–0 on aggregate.

==== Second Round ====
21 October 1970 First leg	Borussia Mönchengladbach (West Germany)	1–1	(England) Everton	Bökelbergstadion, Mönchengladbach
	Vogts 35'	Report	Kendall 47'	Attendance: 29,340; Referee: Karlo Kruashvili (Soviet Union)

4 November 1970 Second leg	Everton (England)	1–1 (a.e.t.) (4–3 p)	(West Germany) Borussia Mönchengladbach	Goodison Park, Liverpool
	Morrissey 1'	Report	Laumen 35'	Attendance: 42,744; Referee: Antonio Sbardella (Italy)
	Penalties
	Royle (penalty missed); Ball (penalty scored); Morrissey (penalty scored); Kendall (penalty scored); Brown (penalty scored)		(penalty scored) Sieloff; (penalty missed) Laumen; (penalty scored) Heynckes; (penalty scored) Köppel; (penalty missed) Müller

2–2 on aggregate; Everton won on penalties.
