= 1969–70 Borussia Mönchengladbach season =

Borussia Mönchengladbach
1969–70 season
- Chairman: Helmut Beyer
- Manager: Hennes Weisweiler
- Bundesliga: Champions
- DFB-Pokal: Quarter-finals
- Top goalscorer: League: Herbert Laumen (19 goals); All: Herbert Laumen (21 goals)
- Highest home attendance: 32,000 vs. FC Schalke 04, 1. FC Köln, Hamburger SV
- Lowest home attendance: 15,000 vs. Eintracht Braunschweig
Home colours	Away colours

The 1969–70 Borussia Mönchengladbach season was the 71st season in the club's history and the 5th in the top-flight of German football. The season began on 16 August 1969 against FC Schalke 04 and finished on 3 May 1970 against Rot-Weiß Oberhausen. This season saw the club win their first national title through the 1969–70 Bundesliga, winning the tournament with 51 points.

== Season overview ==
In the 1969–70 season, Borussia Mönchengladbach, coached by Hennes Weisweiler, won the 1969–70 Bundesliga. In the 1969–70 DFB-Pokal, Borussia Mönchengladbach were eliminated in the quarter-finals by 1. FC Köln. This season was notable for the signing of the club's second foreign player through Danish forward Ulrik le Fevre following Yugoslav defender Vladimir Durković in the 1966–67 season.

== Squad ==
Note: Flags indicate national team as defined under FIFA eligibility rules; some limited exceptions apply. Players may hold more than one non-FIFA nationality.

No.	Pos.	Nation	Player
—	GK	GER	Volker Danner
—	GK	GER	Wolfgang Kleff
—	DF	GER	Heinz Koch
—	DF	GER	Berti Vogts
—	DF	GER	Klaus-Dieter Sieloff
—	DF	GER	Rainer Bonhof
—	DF	GER	Ludwig Müller
—	DF	GER	Hans-Jürgen Wittkamp
—	DF	GER	Heinz Wittmann
—	DF	GER	Hartwig Bleidick
—	MF	GER	Winfried Schäfer

No.	Pos.	Nation	Player
—	MF	GER	Werner Kaiser
—	MF	GER	Gerd Zimmermann
—	MF	GER	Herbert Wimmer
—	MF	GER	Peter Dietrich
—	MF	GER	Hans-Jürgen Wloka
—	MF	GER	Erwin Spinnler
—	FW	GER	Günter Netzer
—	FW	DEN	Ulrik le Fevre
—	FW	GER	Horst Köppel
—	FW	GER	Peter Kracke
—	FW	GER	Peter Meyer

== Transfers ==
=== In ===
Pos.	Player	Transferred from	Fee	Date	Source
MF	(Germany) Werner Kaiser	(Germany) Borussia Mönchengladbach II		Summer 1969	
FW	(Denmark) Ulrik le Fevre	(Denmark) Vejle BK		Summer 1969	
FW	(Germany) Ludwig Müller	(Germany) 1. FC Nürnberg		Summer 1969	
FW	(Germany) Klaus-Dieter Sieloff	(Germany) VfB Stuttgart		Summer 1969	

=== Out ===
Pos.	Player	Transferred to	Fee	Date	Source
GK	(Germany) Klaus Ackermann	(Germany) 1. FC Kaiserslautern		Summer 1969	
DF	(Germany) Manfred Kempers	(Germany) 1. FC Saarbrücken		Summer 1969	
FW	(Germany) Erwin Kremers	(Germany) Kickers Offenbach		Summer 1969	
DF	(Germany) Helmut Kremers	(Germany) Kickers Offenbach		Summer 1969	
DF	(Germany) Egon Milder	(Switzerland) Luzern		Summer 1969	
MF	(Germany) Gerd Pittscheidt	(Germany) Viktoria Köln		Summer 1969	
MF	(Germany) Rudolf Pöggeler	(Germany) SV Victoria 11 Köln		Summer 1969	
MF	(Germany) Klaus Winkler	(Germany) Kickers Offenbach		Summer 1969	

== Match results ==
=== Legend ===
Win Draw Loss

=== Bundesliga ===
16 August 1969 1	FC Schalke 04	2–0	Borussia Mönchengladbach	Glückauf-Kampfbahn, Gelsenkirchen
15:30 CET	Wittkamp 35'; Wüst 80'	Report		Attendance: 38,000; Referee: Kurt Tschenscher (Mannheim)

23 August 1969 2	Borussia Mönchengladbach	2–1	Bayern Munich	Bökelbergstadion, Mönchengladbach
15:30 CET	Kaiser 48'; Laumen 72'	Report	Starek 11'	Attendance: 32,000; Referee: Gerhard Schulenburg (Hamburg)

30 August 1969 3	Borussia Mönchengladbach	2–1	Rot-Weiss Essen	Bökelbergstadion, Mönchengladbach
15:30 CET	Kaiser 52'; Schäfer 75'	Report	Beer 4'	Attendance: 28,000; Referee: Günter Linn (Altendiez)

5 September 1969 4	Eintracht Frankfurt	1–2	Borussia Mönchengladbach	Waldstadion, Frankfurt
20:00 CET	Schämer 59'	Report	Kaiser 13'; Laumen 19'	Attendance: 37,000; Referee: Walter Horstmann (Groß Escherde)

12 September 1969 5	Borussia Mönchengladbach	1–1	1. FC Kaiserslautern	Bökelbergstadion, Mönchengladbach
20:00 CET	Vogts 21'	Report	Geisert 85'	Attendance: 28,000; Referee: Franz Wengenmayer (Munich)

27 September 1969 6	Borussia Dortmund	2–1	Borussia Mönchengladbach	Stadion Rote Erde, Dortmund
15:30 CET	Weist 61', 89'	Report	41' Kaiser	Attendance: 26,000; Referee: Heinz Siebert (Mannheim)

4 October 1969 7	Borussia Mönchengladbach	1–0	Eintracht Braunschweig	Bökelbergstadion, Mönchengladbach
15:30 CET	Netzer 27' (pen.)	Report		Attendance: 15,000; Referee: Rudolf Schröck (Riegelsberg)

11 October 1969 8	SV Werder Bremen	0–0	Borussia Mönchengladbach	Weserstadion, Bremen
15:30 CET		Report		Attendance: 14,000; Referee: Fritz Seiler (Schmiden)

15 October 1969 9	Borussia Mönchengladbach	4–1	MSV Duisburg	Bökelbergstadion, Mönchengladbach
20:00 CET	Vogts 26'; Laumen 29', 46'; Wimmer 66'	Report	Sondermann 34'	Attendance: 24,000; Referee: Elmar Schäfer (Neustadt/Rübenberge)

25 October 1969 10	TSV 1860 Munich	0–3	Borussia Mönchengladbach	Grünwalder Stadion, Munich
15:30 CET		Report	Müller 14'; Laumen 58', 77'	Attendance: 13,000; Referee: Horst Herden (Hamburg)

31 October 1969 11	Borussia Mönchengladbach	5–1	Alemannia Aachen	Bökelbergstadion, Mönchengladbach
20:00 CEST	Köppel 13'; Laumen 52'; le Fevre 69'; Netzer 76'; Wimmer 87'	Report	Ionescu 43'	Attendance: 25,000; Referee: Helmut Fritz (Ludwigshafen)

8 November 1969 12	Hertha BSC	1–1	Borussia Mönchengladbach	Olympiastadion, Berlin
15:30 CET	Wild 90'	Report	Laumen 81'	Attendance: 80,000; Referee: Diedrich Basedow (Hamburg)

15 November 1969 13	Borussia Mönchengladbach	3–0	VfB Stuttgart	Bökelbergstadion, Mönchengladbach
15:30 CET	Köppel 8', 33', 61'	Report		Attendance: 25,000; Referee: Jan Redelfs (Hannover)

29 November 1969 14	1. FC Köln	0–1	Borussia Mönchengladbach	Müngersdorfer Stadion, Cologne
15:30 CET		Report	Fevre 88'	Attendance: 54,000; Referee: Kurt Tschenscher (Mannheim)

5 December 1969 15	Borussia Mönchengladbach	5–0	Hannover 96	Bökelbergstadion, Mönchengladbach
20:00 CET	Laumen 43', 53'; Wimmer 50'; Dietrich 57', 78'	Report		Attendance: 25,000; Referee: Ferdinand Biwersi (Bliesransbach)

13 Decenmber 1969 16	Hamburger SV	1–3	Borussia Mönchengladbach	Volksparkstadion, Hamburg
15:30 CET	Hönig 86'	Report	Dietrich 65'; Laumen 67'; Fevre 85'	Attendance: 25,000; Referee: Alfred Ott (Rheinbrohl)

19 December 1969 17	Borussia Mönchengladbach	6–1	Rot-Weiß Oberhausen	Bökelbergstadion, Mönchengladbach
20:00 CET	Laumen 15'; Fevre 30'; Vogts 32', 46'; Dietrich 62'; Bleidick 88'	Report	Dausmann 75'	Attendance: 25,000; Referee: Klaus Ohmsen (Hamburg)

11 March 1970 18	Borussia Mönchengladbach	2–0	FC Schalke 04	Bökelbergstadion, Mönchengladbach
20:00 CET	Netzer 31'; Laumen 70'	Report		Attendance: 32,000; Referee: Heinz Aldinger (Waiblingen)

15 April 1970 19	Bayern Munich	1–0	Borussia Mönchengladbach	Grünwalder Stadion, Munich
20:00 CET	Roth 28'	Report		Attendance: 40,000; Referee: Horst Herden (Hamburg)

21 April 1970 20	Rot-Weiss Essen	1–0	Borussia Mönchengladbach	Georg-Melches-Stadion, Essen
20:00 CET	Lippens 79'	Report		Attendance: 25,000; Referee: Heinz Siebert (Mannheim)

31 January 1970 21	Borussia Mönchengladbach	1–2	Eintracht Frankfurt	Bökelbergstadion, Mönchengladbach
15:30 CET	Köppel 68'	Report	Hölzenbein 57'; Heese 63'	Attendance: 17,000; Referee: Ferdinand Biwersi (Bliesransbach)

7 February 1970 22	1. FC Kaiserslautern	1–4	Borussia Mönchengladbach	Betzenbergstadion, Kaiserslautern
15:30 CET	Geisert 22'	Report	Wimmer 15'; Netzer 57'; Laumen 62'; Köppel 78'	Attendance: 28,000; Referee: Klaus Ohmsen (Hamburg)

14 February 1970 23	Borussia Mönchengladbach	4–2	Borussia Dortmund	Bökelbergstadion, Mönchengladbach
15:30 CET	Sieloff 21'; Netzer 34'; Laumen 38'; Köppel 53'	Report	Schütz 52'; Weist 73'	Attendance: 21,000; Referee: Albert Binder (Holzgerlingen)

24 March 1970 24	Eintracht Braunschweig	0–1	Borussia Mönchengladbach	Stadion an der Hamburger Straße, Braunschweig
20:00 CET		Report	Wimmer 61'	Attendance: 32,000; Referee: Rudolf Frickel (Munich)

28 February 1970 25	Borussia Mönchengladbach	1–0	Werder Bremen	Bökelbergstadion, Mönchengladbach
15:30 CET	Fevre 88'	Report		Attendance: 18,000; Referee: Kurt Tschenscher (Mannheim)

7 March 1970 26	MSV Duisburg	0–1	Borussia Mönchengladbach	Wedaustadion, Duisburg
15:30 CET		Report	Fevre 17'	Attendance: 29,000; Referee: Alfons Betz (Regensburg)

14 March 1970 27	Borussia Mönchengladbach	3–1	TSV 1860 Munich	Bökelbergstadion, Mönchengladbach
15:30 CET	Fevre 30'; Wimmer 45'; Schäfer 68'	Report	Müller 21' (o.g.)	Attendance: 28,000; Referee: Horst Herden (Hamburg)

21 March 1970 28	Alemannia Aachen	0–3	Borussia Mönchengladbach	Old Tivoli, Aachen
15:30 CET		Report	Martinelli 36' (o.g.); Laumen 63'; Sieloff 87'	Attendance: 16,000; Referee: Gerhard Schulenburg (Laatzen)

28 March 1970 29	Borussia Mönchengladbach	1–1	Hertha BSC	Bökelbergstadion, Mönchengladbach
15:30 CET	Köppel 18'	Report	Steffenhagen 61'	Attendance: 25,000; Referee: Walter Horstmann (Groß Escherde)

4 April 1970 30	VfB Stuttgart	0–0	Borussia Mönchengladbach	Neckarstadion, Stuttgart
15:30 CET		Report		Attendance: 45,000; Referee: Jan Redelfs (Hannover)

11 April 1970 31	Borussia Mönchengladbach	2–0	1. FC Köln	Bökelbergstadion, Mönchengladbach
15:30 CET	Sieloff 35'; Laumen 50'	Report		Attendance: 32,000; Referee: Kurt Tschenscher (Mannheim)

18 April 1970 32	Hannover 96	1–0	Borussia Mönchengladbach	Niedersachsenstadion, Hannover
15:30 CET	Siemensmeyer 33'	Report		Attendance: 30,000; Referee: Fritz Seiler (Schmiden)

30 April 1970 33	Borussia Mönchengladbach	4–3	Hamburger SV	Bökelbergstadion, Mönchengladbach
15:30 CET	Laumen 14'; Vogts 38'; Köppel 45'; Bleidick 47'	Report	Kremer 54'; Dörfel 69'; Fock 85'	Attendance: 32,000; Referee: Karl Riegg (Augsburg)

3 May 1970 34	Rot-Weiß Oberhausen	3–4	Borussia Mönchengladbach	Niederrheinstadion, Oberhausen
15:30 CET	Krauthausen 16', 76'; Fritsche 65'	Report	Dietrich 8'; Laumen 33'; Netzer 84'; Fevre 90'	Attendance: 25,000; Referee: Dieter Heckeroth (Frankfurt/Main)

=== DFB-Pokal ===
2 January 1970 First round	Eintracht Gelsenkirchen	1–3	Borussia Mönchengladbach	Südstadion, Gelsenkirchen
CET	Kontny 65' (pen.)	Report	Laumen 47', 85'; Schäfer 61'	Attendance: 8,000; Referee: Gert Meuser (Ingelheim)

29 July 1970 Round of 16	Hannover 96	1–3	Borussia Mönchengladbach	Niedersachsenstadion, Hannover
CET	Keller 64'	Report	Müller 16'; Heynckes 48'; Köppel 52'	Attendance: 25,000; Referee: Dieter Wohlfarth (Bergen-Enkheim)

5 August 1970 Quarterfinals	Borussia Mönchengladbach	2–3	1. FC Köln	Bökelbergstadion, Mönchengladbach
CET	Vogts 52'; Müller 60' (pen.)	Report	Löhr 31'; Biskup 87' (pen.); Hemmersbach 93'	Attendance: 32,000; Referee: Franz Wengenmayer (Munich)
