= 1970–71 Bundesliga =

8th season of the Bundesliga

Bundesliga
- Season: 1970–71
- Dates: 15 August 1970 – 5 June 1971
- Champions: Borussia Mönchengladbach; 2nd Bundesliga title 2nd German title
- Relegated: Kickers Offenbach; Rot-Weiss Essen
- European Cup: Borussia Mönchengladbach
- Cup Winners' Cup: FC Bayern Munich
- UEFA Cup: Hertha BSC; Eintracht Braunschweig; Hamburger SV; 1. FC Köln (losing DFB Cup finalists to Bayern)
- Goals: 914
- Average goals/game: 2.99
- Top goalscorer: Lothar Kobluhn (24)
- Biggest home win: Oberhausen 8–1 Hamburg (26 September 1970); FC Bayern 7–0 Köln (15 May 1971)
- Biggest away win: Kaiserslautern 0–5 Stuttgart (5 December 1970)
- Highest scoring: Oberhausen 8–1 Hamburg (9 goals) (26 September 1970); Dortmund 7–2 Essen (9 goals) (8 May 1971)

The 1970–71 Bundesliga was the eighth season of the Bundesliga, West Germany's premier football league. It began on 15 August 1970 and ended on 5 June 1971. Borussia Mönchengladbach were the defending champions.

== Competition modus ==
Every team played two games against each other team, one at home and one away. Teams received two points for a win and one point for a draw. If two or more teams were tied on points, places were determined by goal difference and, if still tied, by goals scored. The team with the most points were crowned champions while the two teams with the fewest points were relegated to their respective Regionalliga divisions.

== Team changes to 1969–70 ==
TSV 1860 Munich and Alemannia Aachen were relegated to the Regionalliga after finishing in the last two places. They were replaced by Arminia Bielefeld and Kickers Offenbach, who won their respective promotion play-off groups.

== Season overview ==
Borussia Mönchengladbach successfully defended their title. FC Bayern Munich ended up in second place, but not without a title, as they defeated 1. FC Köln in the domestic cup final, thereby qualifying for the Cup Winners' Cup. As a consequence, Bayern's original spot in the newly formed UEFA Cup, to which teams finishing in second to fifth place were permitted to enter, went to Köln. The latter were joined by Hertha BSC, Eintracht Braunschweig and Hamburger SV. The teams demoted to the Regionalliga were Kickers Offenbach and Rot-Weiss Essen.

=== Bundesliga scandal ===
Eventually, it was revealed that the decisions in the league had not been determined on the strength of each team alone. On 6 June 1971, Offenbach chairman Horst-Gregorio Canellas played an audio tape to an audience who originally had gathered to celebrate Canellas' 50th birthday. The circle included national team coach Helmut Schön, as well as high DFB representatives and also a few reporters. The tape proved that matches had been sold for money. Soon, the DFB launched its own investigation. It was discovered that a total of 18 games had been fixed, including almost every relevant match in the relegation decision. Over 60 players from ten clubs were involved and nearly one million marks had been paid. Nevertheless, the first verdicts were not spoken until after the start of the following season, meaning that the bribed games officially counted in the final table.

== Team overview ==
Location of teams in Bundesliga 1970–71

Club	Ground	Capacity
Hertha BSC	Olympiastadion	100,000
Arminia Bielefeld	Stadion Alm	32,000
Eintracht Braunschweig	Eintracht-Stadion	38,000
SV Werder Bremen	Weserstadion	32,000
Borussia Dortmund	Stadion Rote Erde	30,000
MSV Duisburg	Wedaustadion	38,500
Rot-Weiss Essen	Georg-Melches-Stadion	40,000
Eintracht Frankfurt	Waldstadion	87,000
Hamburger SV	Volksparkstadion	80,000
Hannover 96	Niedersachsenstadion	86,000
1. FC Kaiserslautern	Stadion Betzenberg	42,000
1. FC Köln	Müngersdorfer Stadion	76,000
Borussia Mönchengladbach	Bökelbergstadion	34,500
FC Bayern Munich	Stadion an der Grünwalder Straße	44,300
Rot-Weiß Oberhausen	Niederrheinstadion	30,000
Kickers Offenbach	Bieberer Berg	30,000
FC Schalke 04	Glückauf-Kampfbahn	35,000
VfB Stuttgart	Neckarstadion	53,000

== League table ==
Pos	Team	Pld	W	D	L	GF	GA	GD	Pts	Qualification or relegation
1	Borussia Mönchengladbach (C)	34	20	10	4	77	35	+42	50	Qualification to European Cup first round
2	Bayern Munich	34	19	10	5	74	36	+38	48	Qualification to Cup Winners' Cup first round
3	Hertha BSC	34	16	9	9	61	43	+18	41	Qualification to UEFA Cup first round
4	Eintracht Braunschweig	34	16	7	11	52	40	+12	39	Qualification to UEFA Cup first round
5	Hamburger SV	34	13	11	10	54	63	−9	37	Qualification to UEFA Cup first round
6	Schalke 04	34	15	6	13	44	40	+4	36	
7	MSV Duisburg	34	12	11	11	43	47	−4	35	
8	1. FC Kaiserslautern	34	15	4	15	54	57	−3	34	
9	Hannover 96	34	12	9	13	53	49	+4	33	
10	Werder Bremen	34	11	11	12	41	40	+1	33	
11	1. FC Köln	34	11	11	12	46	56	−10	33	Qualification to UEFA Cup first round (Note: As Bayern Munich qualified for the Cup Winners' Cup, their UEFA Cup place was transferred to DFB-Pokal runners-up 1. FC Köln.)
12	VfB Stuttgart	34	11	8	15	49	49	0	30	
13	Borussia Dortmund	34	10	9	15	54	60	−6	29	
14	Arminia Bielefeld	34	12	5	17	34	53	−19	29	
15	Eintracht Frankfurt	34	11	6	17	39	56	−17	28	
16	Rot-Weiß Oberhausen	34	9	9	16	54	69	−15	27	
17	Kickers Offenbach (R)	34	9	9	16	49	65	−16	27	Relegation to Regionalliga
18	Rot-Weiss Essen (R)	34	7	9	18	48	68	−20	23	Relegation to Regionalliga

Source: www.dfb.de
Rules for classification: 1) points; 2) goal difference; 3) number of goals scored.
(C) Champions; (R) Relegated

== Results ==
Home \ Away	BSC	DSC	EBS	SVW	BVB	DUI	RWE	SGE	HSV	H96	FCK	KOE	BMG	FCB	RWO	KOF	S04	VFB
Hertha BSC	—	0–1	1–0	3–1	5–2	3–1	1–1	6–2	2–0	0–0	5–3	3–2	4–2	3–3	3–1	3–1	2–1	2–0
Arminia Bielefeld	1–1	—	0–1	3–0	2–3	0–0	0–0	1–0	1–1	3–1	2–1	1–0	0–2	1–0	2–1	2–0	0–3	1–0
Eintracht Braunschweig	2–1	3–2	—	1–0	3–0	5–0	1–0	2–0	4–1	0–4	2–0	3–1	1–1	1–1	1–1	3–0	3–3	4–0
Werder Bremen	0–0	4–1	2–0	—	3–1	0–2	1–1	1–0	2–2	0–0	1–1	1–1	1–1	0–1	2–0	3–1	0–1	3–1
Borussia Dortmund	3–1	3–0	1–1	0–1	—	5–1	7–2	3–0	1–1	2–2	0–2	0–0	3–4	0–0	2–0	1–1	1–2	3–1
MSV Duisburg	1–0	4–1	0–0	3–1	4–3	—	1–0	3–1	2–2	3–2	1–1	0–0	1–1	2–0	2–2	2–2	1–0	1–0
Rot-Weiss Essen	0–3	2–1	0–1	2–2	0–1	1–1	—	2–0	1–3	2–0	4–0	2–0	1–2	3–1	3–3	2–3	1–3	1–1
Eintracht Frankfurt	1–3	1–1	5–2	0–2	2–0	0–0	3–2	—	0–0	2–1	3–2	1–1	1–4	0–1	5–0	3–0	1–0	1–0
Hamburger SV	0–0	3–2	2–1	1–1	2–1	2–0	2–1	3–0	—	1–0	5–2	2–0	2–2	1–5	0–0	3–2	1–2	1–0
Hannover 96	1–1	2–0	1–0	0–3	4–1	3–3	3–1	1–2	0–3	—	2–1	2–0	1–1	2–2	1–2	1–1	3–0	3–0
1. FC Kaiserslautern	2–0	3–0	0–1	2–1	1–0	3–0	5–2	2–0	2–0	2–1	—	0–0	0–1	2–1	4–1	4–0	2–0	0–5
1. FC Köln	3–2	2–0	3–1	1–1	2–2	2–1	3–2	0–0	3–0	0–1	1–2	—	3–2	0–3	2–4	4–2	2–0	2–1
Borussia Mönchengladbach	4–0	0–2	3–1	0–2 (Note: The Borussia Mönchengladbach v Werder Bremen match from 3 April 1971 was suspended after 88 minutes and a score of 1–1 due to a broken goal post. Since Borussia Mönchengladbach could not provide a replacement goal post, the match was abandoned and later awarded to Werder Bremen with a score of 0–2.)	3–2	1–0	4–3	5–0	3–0	0–0	5–0	1–1	—	3–1	6–0	2–0	2–0	4–1
Bayern Munich	1–0	2–0	4–1	2–1	1–1	2–1	2–2	2–1	6–2	4–1	3–1	7–0	2–2	—	4–2	0–0	3–0	1–0
Rot-Weiß Oberhausen	1–1	4–2	1–0	3–0	0–1	0–2	0–0	0–0	8–1	4–3	4–2	2–2	0–2	0–4	—	2–2	4–1	1–2
Kickers Offenbach	1–0	5–0	0–2	2–1	3–0	2–0	1–2	0–2	3–3	1–5	2–2	4–1	1–3	1–1	3–2	—	0–1	3–3
Schalke 04	0–1	0–1	1–0	0–0	0–0	1–0	4–1	4–1	3–1	3–0	2–0	2–2	0–0	1–3	2–0	1–2	—	2–1
VfB Stuttgart	1–1	1–0	1–1	3–0	6–1	1–0	5–1	2–1	3–3	1–2	2–0	1–2	1–1	1–1	2–1	1–0	1–1	—

Source: DFB
Legend: Blue = home team win; Yellow = draw; Red = away team win.

== Top goalscorers ==
24 goals

- (Germany) Lothar Kobluhn (Rot-Weiß Oberhausen)

22 goals

- (Germany) Gerd Müller (FC Bayern Munich)
- (Germany) Karl-Heinz Vogt (1. FC Kaiserslautern)

20 goals

- (Germany) Lorenz Horr (Hertha BSC)
- (Germany) Herbert Laumen (Borussia Mönchengladbach)

19 goals

- (Germany) Jupp Heynckes (Borussia Mönchengladbach)
- (Germany) Ferdinand Keller (Hannover 96)
- (Germany) Willi Lippens (Rot-Weiss Essen)

18 goals

- (Germany) Lothar Ulsaß (Eintracht Braunschweig)

15 goals

- (Germany) Klaus Fischer (FC Schalke 04)
- (Germany) Hartmut Weiß (VfB Stuttgart)

== Champion squad ==
Borussia Mönchengladbach
Goalkeeper: Wolfgang Kleff (34).

Defenders: Ludwig Müller (34 / 2); Berti Vogts (34 / 1); Klaus-Dieter Sieloff (33 / 6); Heinz Wittmann (20); Hartwig Bleidick (16).
Midfielders: Günter Netzer (32 / 9); Peter Dietrich (28 / 3); Herbert Wimmer (26 / 3); Rainer Bonhof (11 / 1); Hans-Jürgen Wloka (11).
Forwards: Horst Köppel (34 / 9); Jupp Heynckes (33 / 19); Herbert Laumen (31 / 20); Ulrik le Fevre (Denmark) (31 / 3).
(league appearances and goals listed in brackets)

Manager: Hennes Weisweiler.

On the roster but have not played in a league game: Bernd Schrage; Werner Adler.

== See also ==
- 1970–71 DFB-Pokal
