= 1969–70 Bundesliga =

7th season of the Bundesliga

Bundesliga
- Season: 1969–70
- Dates: 16 August 1969 – 3 May 1970
- Champions: Borussia Mönchengladbach; 1st Bundesliga title 1st German title
- Relegated: TSV 1860 Munich; Alemannia Aachen
- European Cup: Borussia Mönchengladbach
- Goals: 951
- Average goals/game: 3.11
- Top goalscorer: Gerd Müller (38)
- Biggest home win: Hertha BSC 9–1 Dortmund (18 April 1970); Köln 8–0 Schalke (8 November 1969)
- Biggest away win: Braunschweig 0–4 Oberhausen (6 September 1969); Braunschweig 0–4 FC Bayern (27 September 1969); Hertha BSC 0–4 FC Bayern (21 March 1970)
- Highest scoring: Hertha BSC 9–1 Dortmund (10 goals) (18 April 1970)

The 1969–70 Bundesliga was the seventh season of the Bundesliga, West Germany's premier football league. It began on 16 August 1969 and ended on 3 May 1970. Bayern Munich were the defending champions.

== Competition modus ==
Every team played two games against each other team, one at home and one away. Teams received two points for a win and one point for a draw. If two or more teams were tied on points, places were determined by goal difference and, if still tied, by goals scored. The team with the most points were crowned champions while the two teams with the fewest points were relegated to their respective Regionalliga divisions.

== Team changes to 1968–69 ==
1. FC Nürnberg and Kickers Offenbach were relegated to the Regionalliga after finishing in the last two places. They were replaced by Rot-Weiss Essen and Rot-Weiß Oberhausen, who won their respective promotion play-off groups.

== Season overview ==
The 1969–70 season saw Borussia Mönchengladbach win their first title. Key to their success was a, in comparison to the previous seasons, significantly improved defense. Mönchengladbach successfully held off Bayern Munich despite a record season of Bayern striker Gerd Müller, who scored 38 goals.

At the other end of the table, 1860 Munich and Alemannia Aachen were demoted. The Munich side was forced to sell several key players because of financial problems, filling the voids with youth players. However, those players lacked Bundesliga capability, so relegation was a logical consequence. Meanwhile, Aachen had an even more disastrous year. Despite a second-place finish in 1968–69, the team was never able to provide even a rudimentary repeat of their level of play throughout the season, which eventually fixed their demotion several rounds before the end of the season.

The season in general was overshadowed by a very harsh winter. A total of 45 games had to be postponed because of frozen pitches and similar conditions between January and April 1970, including a complete round of games on 10 January 1970. As a consequence, many teams had severe scheduling problems. The situation was impaired by the upcoming World Cup, which was to begin only three weeks after the end of the season. Eventually, the table was evened up again, but only prior to the last two rounds of matches.

Other notable events were the cup victory of Regionalliga sides Kickers Offenbach (although the team had already been promoted by the time the final was played) and an incident in a game between rivals Borussia Dortmund and FC Schalke 04 where Schalke player Friedel Rausch was bitten into his rear by a shepherd. The dog had been used by local police to ensure that the pitch in Dortmund's Stadion Rote Erde was kept free of spectators, who gathered until the sidelines in a hopelessly overcrowded venue.

== Team overview ==
Location of teams in Bundesliga 1969–70

Club	Ground	Capacity
Alemannia Aachen	Tivoli	30,000
Hertha BSC	Olympiastadion	100,000
Eintracht Braunschweig	Eintracht-Stadion	38,000
SV Werder Bremen	Weserstadion	32,000
Borussia Dortmund	Stadion Rote Erde	30,000
MSV Duisburg	Wedaustadion	38,500
Rot-Weiss Essen	Georg-Melches-Stadion	40,000
Eintracht Frankfurt	Waldstadion	87,000
Hamburger SV	Volksparkstadion	80,000
Hannover 96	Niedersachsenstadion	86,000
1. FC Kaiserslautern	Stadion Betzenberg	42,000
1. FC Köln	Müngersdorfer Stadion	76,000
Borussia Mönchengladbach	Bökelbergstadion	34,500
TSV 1860 Munich	Stadion an der Grünwalder Straße	44,300
FC Bayern Munich	Stadion an der Grünwalder Straße	44,300
Rot-Weiß Oberhausen	Niederrheinstadion	30,000
FC Schalke 04	Glückauf-Kampfbahn	35,000
VfB Stuttgart	Neckarstadion	53,000

== League table ==
Pos	Team	Pld	W	D	L	GF	GA	GD	Pts	Qualification or relegation
1	Borussia Mönchengladbach (C)	34	23	5	6	71	29	+42	51	Qualification to European Cup first round
2	Bayern Munich	34	21	5	8	88	37	+51	47	Qualification to Inter-Cities Fairs Cup first round
3	Hertha BSC	34	20	5	9	67	41	+26	45	Qualification to Inter-Cities Fairs Cup first round
4	1. FC Köln	34	20	3	11	83	38	+45	43	Qualification to Inter-Cities Fairs Cup first round
5	Borussia Dortmund	34	14	8	12	60	67	−7	36	
6	Hamburger SV	34	12	11	11	57	54	+3	35	Qualification to Inter-Cities Fairs Cup first round
7	VfB Stuttgart	34	14	7	13	59	62	−3	35	
8	Eintracht Frankfurt	34	12	10	12	54	54	0	34	
9	Schalke 04	34	11	12	11	43	54	−11	34	
10	1. FC Kaiserslautern	34	10	12	12	44	55	−11	32	
11	Werder Bremen	34	10	11	13	38	47	−9	31	
12	Rot-Weiss Essen	34	8	15	11	41	54	−13	31	
13	Hannover 96	34	11	8	15	49	61	−12	30	
14	Rot-Weiß Oberhausen	34	11	7	16	50	62	−12	29	
15	MSV Duisburg	34	9	11	14	35	48	−13	29	
16	Eintracht Braunschweig	34	9	10	15	40	49	−9	28	
17	1860 Munich (R)	34	9	7	18	41	56	−15	25	Relegation to Regionalliga
18	Alemannia Aachen (R)	34	5	7	22	31	83	−52	17	Relegation to Regionalliga

Source: www.dfb.de
Rules for classification: 1) points; 2) goal difference; 3) number of goals scored.
(C) Champions; (R) Relegated

== Results ==
Home \ Away	AAC	BSC	EBS	SVW	BVB	DUI	RWE	SGE	HSV	H96	FCK	KOE	BMG	M60	FCB	RWO	S04	VFB
Alemannia Aachen	—	2–4	1–1	0–0	3–1	3–2	0–0	2–1	0–2	1–1	1–1	1–3	0–3	0–0	1–3	2–0	1–2	4–2
Hertha BSC	2–1	—	2–0	4–1	9–1	1–0	4–0	2–0	1–0	1–1	3–0	1–0	1–1	4–2	0–4	1–0	3–0	3–1
Eintracht Braunschweig	3–0	1–2	—	1–2	1–1	2–1	0–0	3–1	3–0	1–1	1–0	1–2	0–1	2–2	0–4	0–4	3–0	1–0
Werder Bremen	4–1	1–0	0–1	—	1–3	0–0	2–1	3–2	1–1	1–0	3–2	2–1	0–0	1–1	1–0	1–1	0–1	1–1
Borussia Dortmund	3–1	0–0	2–2	2–1	—	3–1	4–1	2–1	2–1	2–1	5–1	1–0	2–1	3–1	1–3	3–2	1–1	0–0
MSV Duisburg	2–1	1–3	1–0	1–1	0–1	—	0–1	1–1	0–0	1–0	0–0	1–1	0–1	2–1	4–2	2–1	2–0	1–1
Rot-Weiss Essen	2–0	5–2	1–1	3–2	3–3	0–0	—	1–1	2–2	1–0	1–1	0–0	1–0	3–0	1–1	1–0	1–1	3–3
Eintracht Frankfurt	6–2	1–1	0–0	2–1	2–0	0–1	2–1	—	2–2	3–3	2–1	0–0	1–2	4–3	2–1	5–1	2–1	4–0
Hamburger SV	4–1	1–0	3–3	2–2	4–3	4–1	1–0	5–1	—	2–0	2–1	2–5	1–3	0–1	1–3	2–1	1–1	1–3
Hannover 96	5–0	2–1	0–2	3–2	4–2	0–0	3–0	1–1	1–1	—	4–2	3–4	1–0	3–1	0–1	2–1	3–1	2–0
1. FC Kaiserslautern	3–1	1–0	2–0	1–0	2–2	0–2	0–0	2–0	1–1	5–2	—	3–2	1–4	3–2	0–0	0–0	1–1	3–2
1. FC Köln	3–0	5–1	3–2	3–0	5–2	6–2	5–2	1–2	3–0	5–0	6–1	—	0–1	2–1	0–2	0–1	8–0	3–1
Borussia Mönchengladbach	5–1	1–1	1–0	1–0	4–2	4–1	2–1	1–2	4–3	5–0	1–1	2–0	—	3–1	2–1	6–1	2–0	3–0
1860 Munich	0–0	2–0	1–0	0–1	3–0	2–2	0–0	1–1	0–2	3–0	0–1	1–0	0–3	—	2–1	4–1	0–2	4–1
Bayern Munich	6–0	1–2	5–1	4–1	3–0	2–0	4–0	2–1	2–1	7–2	1–1	1–2	1–0	2–0	—	6–2	6–0	1–2
Rot-Weiß Oberhausen	1–0	3–1	2–1	3–1	2–1	2–0	1–1	3–1	1–3	0–0	0–0	0–2	3–4	3–0	3–3	—	0–3	3–0
Schalke 04	3–0	1–3	1–1	0–0	1–1	0–0	5–3	0–0	1–1	2–0	4–2	1–0	2–0	3–1	2–2	2–2	—	1–2
VfB Stuttgart	5–0	1–4	3–2	1–1	2–1	4–3	4–1	4–0	1–1	2–1	2–1	0–3	0–0	3–1	2–3	4–2	2–0	—

Source: DFB
Legend: Blue = home team win; Yellow = draw; Red = away team win.

== Top goalscorers ==
38 goals

- (Germany) Gerd Müller (FC Bayern Munich)

20 goals

- (Germany) Werner Weist (Borussia Dortmund)

19 goals

- (Germany) Klaus Fischer (TSV 1860 Munich)
- (Germany) Herbert Laumen (Borussia Mönchengladbach)
- (Germany) Hannes Löhr (1. FC Köln)

17 goals

- (Germany) Uwe Seeler (Hamburger SV)

16 goals

- (Germany) Bernd Rupp (1. FC Köln)

15 goals

- (Germany) Franz Brungs (Hertha BSC)
- (Germany) Hugo Dausmann (Rot-Weiß Oberhausen)

13 goals

- (Germany) Wolfgang Gayer (Hertha BSC)
- (Germany) Lorenz Horr (Hertha BSC)

== Champion squad ==
Borussia Mönchengladbach
Goalkeepers: Wolfgang Kleff (34); Volker Danner (1).

Defenders: Berti Vogts (34 / 5); Klaus-Dieter Sieloff (33 / 3); Ludwig Müller (33 / 1); Hartwig Bleidick (28 / 2); Gerd Zimmermann (6); Erwin Spinnler (2).
Midfielders: Peter Dietrich (33 / 5); Günter Netzer (29 / 6); Winfried Schäfer (26 / 2).
Forwards: Herbert Laumen (34 / 19); Horst Köppel (34 / 9); Herbert Wimmer (30 / 6); Ulrik le Fevre (Denmark) (29 / 8); Werner Kaiser (10 / 4); Peter Kracke (2); Peter Meyer (1).
(league appearances and goals listed in brackets)

Manager: Hennes Weisweiler.

On the roster but have not played in a league game: Heinz Koch; Heinz Wittmann.

== See also ==
- 1969–70 DFB-Pokal
