= Heinz Koch =

German footballer (born 1949)

Personal information
- Date of birth: 3 September 1949 (age 77)
- Place of birth: Büttgen, North Rhine-Westphalia, West Germany
- Position: Defender

Youth career
- ???–1968: VfR Büttgen

Senior career*
Years	Team	Apps	(Gls)
1968–1970	Borussia Mönchengladbach	0	(0)
1970–1978	VfL Osnabrück	262	(0)

International career
1968	West Germany U-18	3	(0)
- * Club domestic league appearances and goals

Heinz Koch (born 3 September 1949) is a retired German footballer. He played as a defender, primarily for VfL Osnabrück throughout the 1970s in the Regionalliga Nord and later the 2. Bundesliga.

== Club career ==
Koch began his football career at VfR Büttgen, where Berti Vogts' extraordinary career had also begun and played his way through the Lower Rhine team as he began to attract the attention of the DFB. In addition to Wolfgang Kleff, Koch left such an impression that Borussia Mönchengladbach coach Hennes Weisweiler he also chose to sign Koch and Schäfer for the 1968–69 season and the defensive talent from Büttgen moved to Borussia Mönchengladbach in the Bundesliga in the summer of 1968. At the Bökelbergstadion however, he was unable to prevail against competitors such as Vogts, Egon Milder, Hartwig Bleidick, Erwin Spinnler and Helmut Kremers and did not play a competitive game. During the 1969–70 season, defensive greats Ludwig Müller and Klaus-Dieter Sieloff were also signed and they were able to win the first German championship with Koch's chances of playing further reduced.

In 1970, he joined VfL Osnabrück in the second-tier Regionalliga Nord without making a single appearance for Mönchengladbach. The strong defensive midfielder made 279 appearances for Osnabrück until the end of the 1977–78 season, scoring 23 goals, including 135 games and 12 goals in the 2. Bundesliga. He made his debut under coach Fritz Langner on 16 August 1970 in a 2–2 home draw against Phönix Lübeck in the Regionalliga Nord. He played as a defender in front of goalkeeper Andreas Burose. At the end of the round, VfL won the championship with a one-point lead over FC St. Pauli. Koch had played in 26 league games. In the following promotion round to the Bundesliga, another six appearances were added. Osnabrück finished 2nd behind promoted VfL Bochum who were promoted instead. Players of the 1971 championship team included Friedhelm Holtgrave, Karl August Tripp, Ulrich Kallius, Carsten Baumann and Willi Mumme. After the 1973–74 season, Heinz Koch was voted "best player" by the visitors to VfL Osnabrück's home games by a large margin. By the time of his retirement, he made 262 appearances for the club including 135 appearances in the 2. Bundesliga.

After his playing days, he coached lower-class clubs in the Osnabrück region. He now runs a physiotherapy practice in Belm.

== International career ==
He represented the West Germany U-18 team 1968 UEFA European Under-18 Championship following successfully eliminating Spain in the qualifiers. Alongside Amand Theis, Reiner Geye, Hans-Josef Kapellmann and Winfried Schäfer, the team would end up in dead last with only a single victory over Italy.
