= 1974–75 Bundesliga =

12th season of the Bundesliga

Bundesliga
- Season: 1974–75
- Dates: 24 August 1974 – 14 June 1975
- Champions: Borussia Mönchengladbach; 3rd Bundesliga title 3rd German title
- Relegated: VfB Stuttgart; Tennis Borussia Berlin; Wuppertaler SV
- European Cup: Borussia Mönchengladbach; FC Bayern Munich (title holders)
- Cup Winners' Cup: Eintracht Frankfurt
- UEFA Cup: Hertha BSC; Hamburger SV; 1. FC Köln; MSV Duisburg (losing DFB-Pokal finalists to Frankfurt)
- Goals: 1,056
- Average goals/game: 3.45
- Top goalscorer: Jupp Heynckes (27)
- Biggest home win: Frankfurt 9–1 Essen (5 October 1974)
- Biggest away win: Essen 0–5 Frankfurt (22 March 1975)
- Highest scoring: Düsseldorf 6–5 FC Bayern (11 goals) (7 June 1975)

The 1974–75 Bundesliga was the 12th season of the Bundesliga, West Germany's premier football league. It began on 24 August 1974 and ended on 14 June 1975. FC Bayern Munich were the defending champions.

== Competition modus ==
Every team played two games against each other team, one at home and one away. Teams received two points for a win and one point for a draw. If two or more teams were tied on points, places were determined by goal difference and, if still tied, by goals scored. The team with the most points were crowned champions while the three teams with the fewest points were relegated to their respective 2. Bundesliga divisions.

== Team changes to 1973–74 ==
Fortuna Köln and Hannover 96 were relegated to the newly introduced 2. Bundesliga after finishing in the last two places. Both teams were replaced by Tennis Borussia Berlin and Eintracht Braunschweig, who won their respective promotion play-off groups.

== Team overview ==
Location of teams in Bundesliga 1974–75

Club	Ground	Capacity
Hertha BSC Berlin	Olympiastadion	100,000
Tennis Borussia Berlin	Mommsenstadion	18,000
VfL Bochum	Ruhrstadion	40,000
Eintracht Braunschweig	Eintracht-Stadion	38,000
SV Werder Bremen	Weserstadion	32,000
MSV Duisburg	Wedaustadion	38,500
Fortuna Düsseldorf	Rheinstadion	59,600
Rot-Weiss Essen	Georg-Melches-Stadion	40,000
Eintracht Frankfurt	Waldstadion	87,000
Hamburger SV	Volksparkstadion	80,000
1. FC Kaiserslautern	Stadion Betzenberg	42,000
1. FC Köln	Radrennbahn Müngersdorf	29,000
Borussia Mönchengladbach	Bökelbergstadion	34,500
FC Bayern Munich	Olympiastadion	70,000
Kickers Offenbach	Bieberer Berg	30,000
FC Schalke 04	Parkstadion	70,000
VfB Stuttgart	Neckarstadion	53,000
Wuppertaler SV	Stadion am Zoo	28,000

== League table ==
Pos	Team	Pld	W	D	L	GF	GA	GD	Pts	Qualification or relegation
1	Borussia Mönchengladbach (C)	34	21	8	5	86	40	+46	50	Qualification to European Cup first round
2	Hertha BSC	34	19	6	9	61	43	+18	44	Qualification to UEFA Cup first round
3	Eintracht Frankfurt	34	18	7	9	89	49	+40	43	Qualification to Cup Winners' Cup first round
4	Hamburger SV	34	18	7	9	55	38	+17	43	Qualification to UEFA Cup first round
5	1. FC Köln	34	17	7	10	77	51	+26	41	Qualification to UEFA Cup first round
6	Fortuna Düsseldorf	34	16	9	9	66	55	+11	41	
7	Schalke 04	34	16	7	11	52	37	+15	39	
8	Kickers Offenbach	34	17	4	13	72	62	+10	38	
9	Eintracht Braunschweig	34	14	8	12	52	42	+10	36	
10	Bayern Munich	34	14	6	14	57	63	−6	34	Qualification to European Cup first round (Note: Bayern Munich won the 1974–75 European Cup and thereby automatically qualified as defending champions.)
11	VfL Bochum	34	14	5	15	53	53	0	33	
12	Rot-Weiss Essen	34	10	12	12	56	68	−12	32	
13	1. FC Kaiserslautern	34	13	5	16	56	55	+1	31	
14	MSV Duisburg	34	12	6	16	59	77	−18	30	Qualification to UEFA Cup first round (Note: As Eintracht Frankfurt qualified for the Cup Winners' Cup, their UEFA Cup spot was transferred to DFB-Pokal runners-up MSV Duisburg.)
15	Werder Bremen	34	9	7	18	45	69	−24	25	
16	VfB Stuttgart (R)	34	8	8	18	50	79	−29	24	Relegation to 2. Bundesliga
17	Tennis Borussia Berlin (R)	34	5	6	23	38	89	−51	16	Relegation to 2. Bundesliga
18	Wuppertaler SV (R)	34	2	8	24	32	86	−54	12	Relegation to 2. Bundesliga

Source: www.dfb.de
Rules for classification: 1) points; 2) goal difference; 3) number of goals scored.
(C) Champions; (R) Relegated

== Results ==
Home \ Away	BSC	TBB	BOC	EBS	SVW	DUI	F95	RWE	SGE	HSV	FCK	KOE	BMG	FCB	KOF	S04	VFB	WSV
Hertha BSC	—	2–1	4–2	3–1	2–0	3–0	3–3	4–2	2–1	1–0	2–1	1–1	2–1	4–1	4–1	1–0	4–0	2–0
Tennis Borussia Berlin	0–3	—	2–0	2–2	4–0	2–3	1–4	1–0	1–4	0–3	3–2	2–3	1–4	2–2	0–2	0–2	1–1	0–0
VfL Bochum	4–0	0–0	—	1–0	3–1	1–2	4–2	2–2	3–1	4–2	4–0	3–2	0–0	3–0	3–1	2–1	1–0	4–2
Eintracht Braunschweig	2–1	5–0	2–0	—	0–0	4–1	3–0	4–2	2–0	1–2	3–2	1–4	1–3	3–1	1–0	1–0	6–0	1–1
Werder Bremen	4–0	1–1	3–0	0–0	—	3–1	0–0	0–0	0–3	1–0	3–1	4–1	1–4	0–2	3–6	0–1	5–2	2–1
MSV Duisburg	1–3	2–3	3–1	3–2	4–0	—	0–3	3–3	1–3	2–0	3–2	1–3	1–1	2–1	2–1	2–0	3–3	2–2
Fortuna Düsseldorf	0–0	3–2	0–1	2–2	4–1	1–1	—	4–0	2–2	0–0	2–0	3–0	3–2	6–5	3–2	2–1	4–0	2–0
Rot-Weiss Essen	2–1	3–2	1–1	1–2	1–1	3–0	1–2	—	0–5	0–0	3–1	1–1	1–3	2–2	5–1	4–4	3–1	2–0
Eintracht Frankfurt	1–2	7–1	4–1	2–0	2–1	4–1	4–0	9–1	—	1–3	5–1	3–2	1–1	2–0	0–0	2–1	5–5	5–0
Hamburger SV	1–1	4–0	3–2	0–0	2–0	2–3	2–1	2–2	3–1	—	2–0	3–1	1–1	1–0	1–0	1–1	1–0	4–1
1. FC Kaiserslautern	3–0	4–0	1–0	2–0	4–1	2–0	1–0	2–0	2–2	1–0	—	1–1	1–3	0–1	1–2	1–1	6–0	2–0
1. FC Köln	2–1	7–1	4–1	3–0	3–1	4–2	2–2	0–1	0–0	4–0	2–0	—	1–2	1–0	0–1	4–2	4–2	4–0
Borussia Mönchengladbach	1–1	3–1	3–0	2–0	4–2	4–1	3–1	1–1	3–0	1–3	3–0	1–1	—	1–2	5–2	1–0	5–1	6–2
Bayern Munich	2–1	3–1	2–1	1–0	2–0	2–1	4–0	2–2	2–1	0–1	2–5	6–3	1–1	—	2–3	0–2	1–1	3–1
Kickers Offenbach	3–1	3–2	2–0	2–1	5–1	3–3	2–3	1–3	2–1	4–1	2–2	1–4	4–3	6–0	—	3–0	3–1	3–1
Schalke 04	1–0	3–0	1–0	1–1	2–0	5–0	3–0	3–0	1–1	3–1	2–1	1–1	1–3	2–2	2–0	—	2–0	1–0
VfB Stuttgart	1–2	2–1	1–0	0–0	2–2	2–1	1–1	3–2	3–4	1–2	0–1	2–0	1–2	1–2	3–1	3–1	—	5–1
Wuppertaler SV	0–0	2–0	1–1	0–1	2–4	1–4	2–3	0–2	2–3	0–4	3–3	1–4	1–5	3–1	0–0	0–1	2–2	—

Source: DFB
Legend: Blue = home team win; Yellow = draw; Red = away team win.

== Top goalscorers ==
27 goals

- (Germany) Jupp Heynckes (Borussia Mönchengladbach)

24 goals

- (Germany) Dieter Müller (1. FC Köln)

23 goals

- (Germany) Gerd Müller (FC Bayern Munich)

21 goals

- (Sweden) Roland Sandberg (1. FC Kaiserslautern)

18 goals

- (Denmark) Allan Simonsen (Borussia Mönchengladbach)
- (Germany) Erwin Kostedde (Kickers Offenbach)
- (Germany) Manfred Burgsmüller (Rot-Weiss Essen)

17 goals

- (Germany) Klaus Fischer (FC Schalke 04)
- (Germany) Hermann Ohlicher (VfB Stuttgart)

16 goals

- (Germany) Bernd Hölzenbein (Eintracht Frankfurt)

== Champion squad ==
Borussia Mönchengladbach
Goalkeeper: Wolfgang Kleff (34).

Defenders: Berti Vogts (34); Hans-Jürgen Wittkamp (29 / 6); Rainer Bonhof (28 / 6); Hans Klinkhammer (23); Frank Schäffer (14); Ulrich Surau (14); Walter Posner (2).
Midfielders: Herbert Wimmer (29 / 1); Uli Stielike (25 / 1); Christian Kulik (24 / 6); Dietmar Danner (21 / 3); Lorenz-Günther Köstner (18 / 1); Horst Köppel (7 / 1).
Forwards: Allan Simonsen (Denmark) (34 / 18); Henning Jensen (Denmark) (34 / 13); Jupp Heynckes (31 / 27); Lorenz Hilkes (5); Karl Del'Haye (4).
(league appearances and goals listed in brackets)

Manager: Hennes Weisweiler.

On the roster but have not played in a league game: Gregor Quasten; Norbert Kox; Roger Roebben.

== Attendances ==
No.	Team	Attendance	Change	Highest
1	Schalke 04	39,988	-5.8%	70,300
2	Bayern München	36,412	-3.1%	73,000
3	Hertha BSC	36,235	31.3%	91,000
4	Hamburger SV	31,941	29.1%	57,000
5	VfB Stuttgart	26,599	-3.5%	65,000
6	Eintracht Frankfurt	23,788	-2.6%	58,400
7	OFC Kickers	22,412	50.9%	35,000
8	Fortuna 95	22,235	-7.0%	55,000
9	Borussia Mönchengladbach	22,150	-0.5%	34,500
10	BTSV Eintracht	21,235	131.7%	38,000
11	1. FC Kaiserslautern	19,824	11.8%	37,000
12	Werder Bremen	18,765	18.5%	40,000
13	1. FC Köln	18,500	8.0%	28,000
14	VfL Bochum	17,647	-1.2%	34,000
15	MSV Duisburg	16,588	-12.3%	31,000
16	RW Essen	15,047	-12.7%	30,000
17	Tennis Borussia Berlin	10,605	666.8%	75,000
18	Wuppertaler SV	9,165	-42.4%	22,000
