= Hennes Weisweiler =

German football player and coach

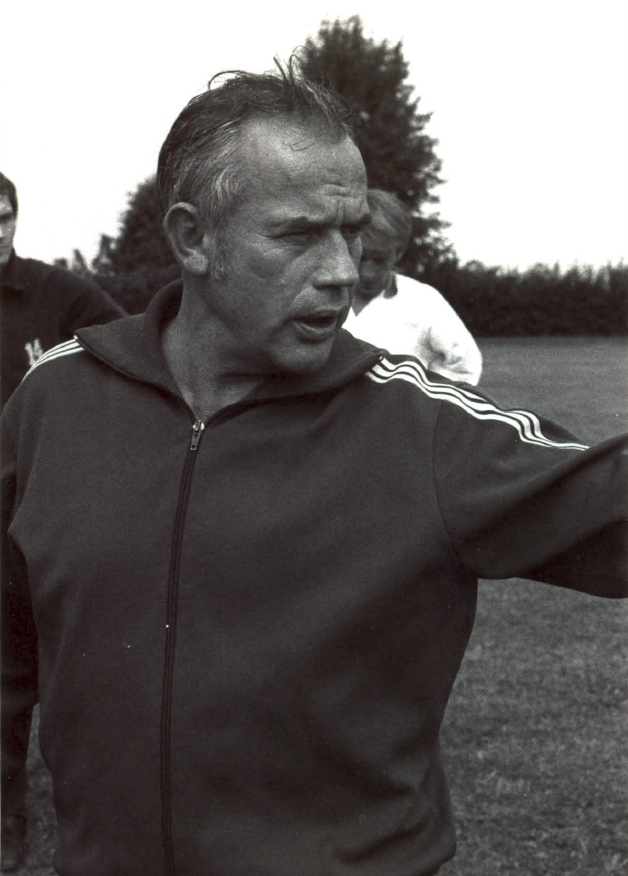
- Weisweiler in 1970

Personal information
- Full name: Hans Weisweiler
- Date of birth: 5 December 1919
- Place of birth: Erftstadt-Lechenich, Germany
- Date of death: 5 July 1983 (aged 63)
- Place of death: Zürich, Switzerland
- Position: Midfielder

Senior career*
Years	Team	Apps	(Gls)
1948–1952	1. FC Köln	62	(0)

Managerial career
- 1949–1952: 1. FC Köln (player-coach)
- 1952–1954: Rheydter SpV
- 1954–1955: Germany (assistant)
- 1955–1958: 1. FC Köln
- 1958–1964: Viktoria Köln
- 1964–1975: Borussia Mönchengladbach
- 1975–1976: Barcelona
- 1976–1980: 1. FC Köln
- 1980–1982: New York Cosmos
- 1982–1983: Grasshopper
- * Club domestic league appearances and goals

Hans "Hennes" Weisweiler (5 December 1919 – 5 July 1983) was a German professional football player and coach. As a coach, he won major titles with Bundesliga clubs Borussia Mönchengladbach and 1. FC Köln in the 1970s.

With eleven titles, eight with West German clubs, Weisweiler was one of the most successful European coaches of his time. His influence went well beyond. Between 1957 and 1970, at the German Sports Academy in Cologne, Weisweiler was responsible for the training of hundreds of coaches from all over the world. In 2005, the training centre for coaches there was named the Hennes-Weisweiler-Academy in his honour.

Weisweiler is most closely associated with the fortunes of Borussia Mönchengladbach in the 1960s and 1970s and with 1. FC Köln in the late 1970s. He is also famous for having developed the talents of many outstanding players, including Günter Netzer, Berti Vogts, Jupp Heynckes, Rainer Bonhof, Allan Simonsen, Uli Stielike, Bernd Schuster and Pierre Littbarski.

== Career ==
=== From player to coach in Cologne ===
The team 1. FC Köln was founded in 1948, and Weisweiler was in the first ever line-up for the club. After the club was promoted in 1949 into the western division of the then five ways split West German first division (Oberliga), he was given the role of player-manager. In this position, which he held until 1952 he played himself 62 times in the league.

In 1955, he returned to the club for another three years as head coach, but left in 1958 to join local rivals Viktoria Köln, which also played in the Oberliga, but the club remained in the shadow of 1. FC. After the foundation of the Bundesliga in 1963, Viktoria played in the second German division. The team achieved its best ever ranking in the last year of Weisweiler's rule of the club.

=== Years in Mönchengladbach ===
Weisweiler took over as manager of Borussia Mönchengladbach in 1964. The club's most recent major title had been its win in the German cup in 1960, and it had found itself in the second division after the inception of the Bundesliga, finishing eighth in the year before he arrived.

Weisweiler found a team with young local talent, such as the 19-year-old Günter Netzer and Jupp Heynckes, as well as Bernd Rupp and Herbert Laumen, who later played for the national team. The next year Borussia, the average age of the players a mere 21.5, finished first in its division and gained promotion to the Bundesliga.

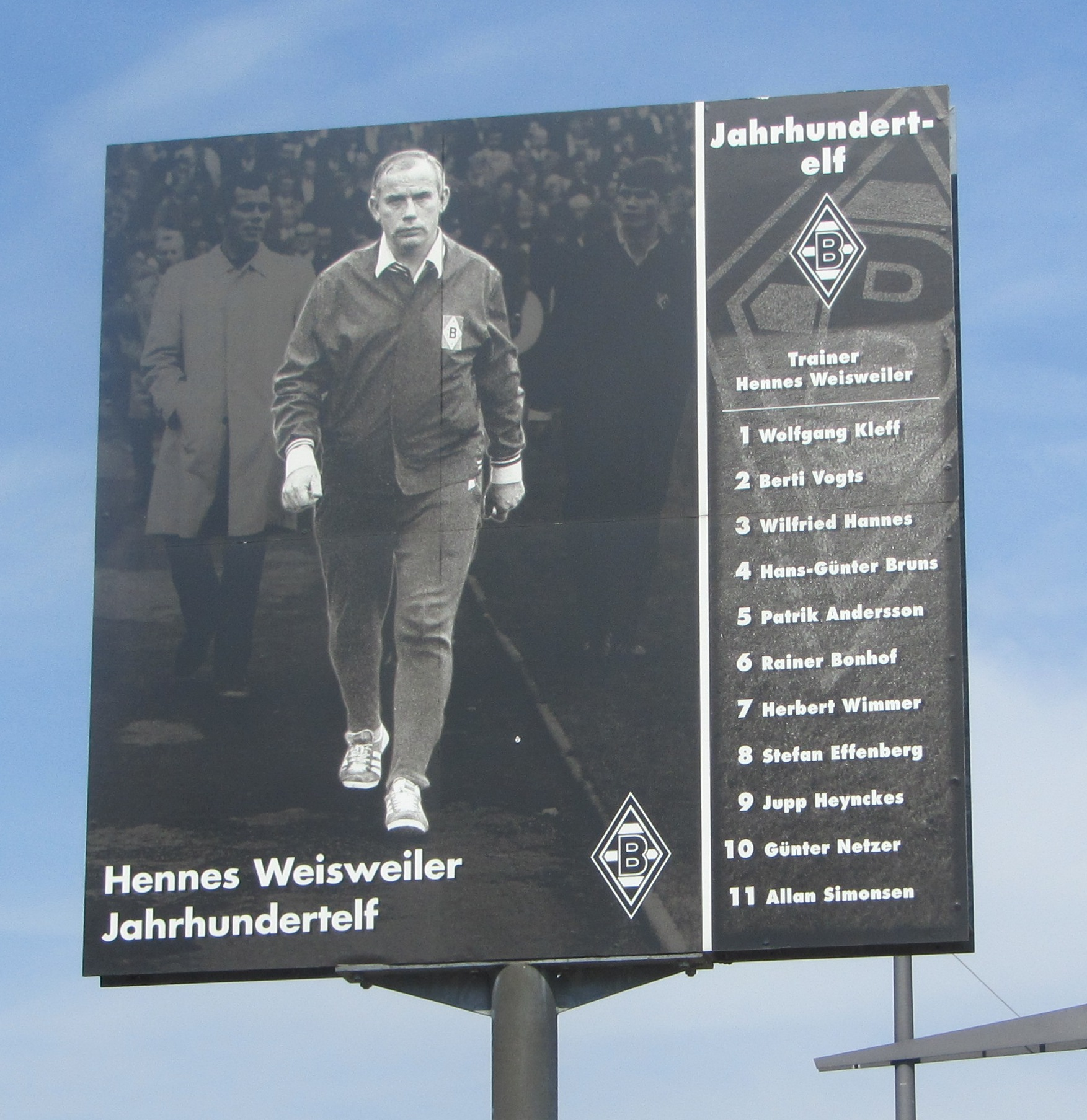
Weisweiler and the names of the players of the "Team of the Century"

With the beginning of the new season another 19-year-old, Berti Vogts, joined the team. The first two years in the Bundesliga were learning years. Despite the later addition of another talented player, Herbert Wimmer, Borussia finished in 13th and 8th place in the league. In its third year the club came to the attention of a wider audience and finished third, despite losing Heynckes to Hannover 96. The team, by now known for their attacking style, repeated that success the following year. At the beginning of the 1969–70 season Borussia was even widely tipped as being the holders Bayern Munich's main rival for the Championship, as the defense had been strengthened with the arrival of international Ludwig Müller, and the attack boosted by the addition of Danish international Ulrik Le Fevre. Decisive also was Weisweiler's ability to find and add further gifted young players, and younger talents including players like Horst Köppel reached sufficient maturity to hold their own on the highest level. This "youth culture" eventually gave Borussia the nickname they still carry today: the Foals.

At the end of the year the team was crowned champion for the first time, and twelve months later the club from the small town became the first side in Bundesliga history to defend the league title. This was secured with a 4–1 away win in Frankfurt, which enabled Borussia to fend off a late Bayern challenge on the last match day.

The team's first European Champions Cup participation had ended in the second round, when after two 1–1 draws with Everton, Borussia lost in the penalty shoot-out. During their second challenge, Helenio Herrera's catenaccio specialists Inter Milan, at the time one of Europe's most celebrated sides, visited the Bökelberg stadium. During the first half of the match, with Borussia leading 2–1, Inter's Roberto Boninsegna was allegedly hit in the head by a soft drink can thrown from the stands, and had been stretchered off. It is disputed that he had actually been struck, or if it had truly caused him injury. Borussia had obliterated Inter by a final score of 7–1. Netzer later said his team had played so well they would have defeated any side in Europe by a huge margin, however Inter players said that when Boninsegna got stretchered off they essentially stopped playing. The empty can was presented to the referee, and afterwards when Inter's officials complained, the governing authorities annulled the match and ordered it to be replayed on a neutral ground. Inter won its home leg against Borussia 4–2, and the neutral match played in Berlin ended 0–0. The annulled match has come to be called 'the Match of the Can', Inter went on to lose in the European Cup final to Ajax.

In the Bundesliga, only three days after the initial triumph against Inter, the Foals defeated the surprise team of the season, Schalke 04, 7–0, but Bayern Munich won the title and Borussia finished third. Before the season Borussia had let Dietrich, Horst Köppel and Herbert Laumen go, and important parts of the team were crucially weakened, as new players such as Rainer Bonhof and Dietmar Danner were not yet able to fill the gaps.

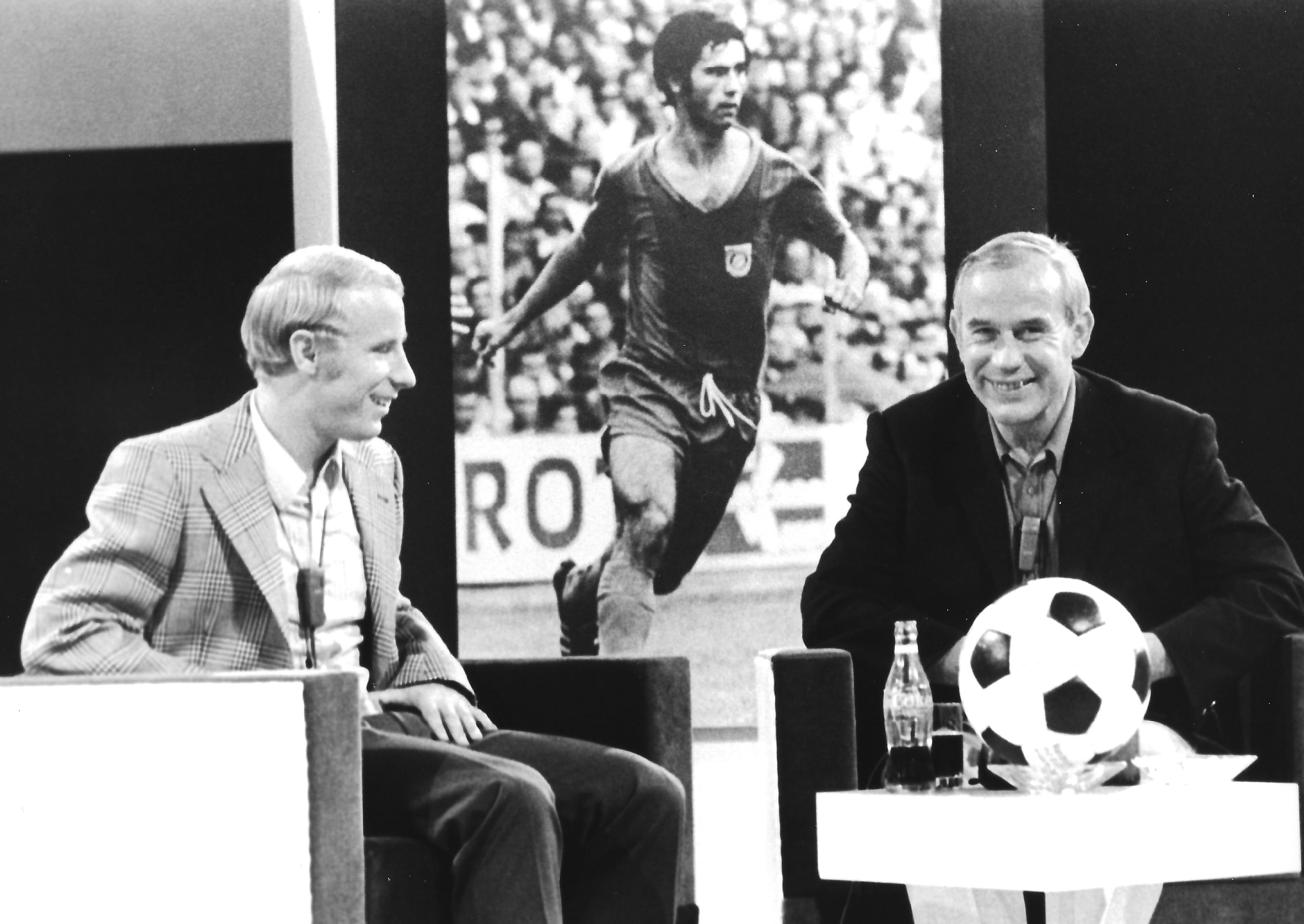
Weisweiler (right) alongside Berti Vogts, one of his players at Mönchengladbach, 1970

The team was restructured further during the 1972–73 season. This time experienced players such as Ulrik Le Fevre left the club, replaced by two young Danish forwards Henning Jensen and Allan Simonsen. Jensen made an immediate impact, but the 19-year-old diminutive lightweight Simonsen was immediately regarded a dud by everyone who saw him in one of his rare appearances in the first team. Weisweiler's expressions of belief in Simonson were met with general disbelief, but five years later Simonsen was voted Europe's Player of the Year.

The season was later overshadowed by the first major conflict of Weisweiler with his star. Günter Netzer was, with teammates Herbert Wimmer and Jupp Heynckes, part of the powerful German side that won the 1972 European Championship in Belgium. Many thought he was the tournament's most glamorous player. Weisweiler may have resented that he himself was no longer the star of the team. Netzer may have wanted to move to a more glamorous club, that paid him more. The conflict ended in separation, and a few weeks before the end of the season Netzer's departure to Real Madrid was announced. There was still one important match to go: the DFB-Pokal cup final in Düsseldorf, against Weisweiler's original club 1. FC Köln. The atmosphere was emotionally charged, made more so because the coach left Netzer on the bench. Despite a temperature of 35° both teams played attacking football, and on both sides the goalkeepers, Borussia's Wolfgang Kleff and Cologne's Gerhard Welz, were called on to make major saves. Welz even saving a second half penalty by Heynckes. In the short break before extra time Netzer removed his track suit and, it is said, told Weisweiler he would be playing. Shortly after the game resumed, Netzer, with only his second possession of the ball, scored a winner for Borussia after a give-and-go with Bonhof. Thus ended one of the major 1970s coach-player associations, with Weisweiler and Netzer, in their last year together with Borussia, winning the DFB-Pokal cup but only finishing fifth in the league.

With Netzer gone, Weisweiler had more time again for team building. A consolidated Borussia ended the 1973–74 season in second place, Weisweiler again having managed to infuse good new talent, including future international Uli Stielike, into his side.

The newly-found harmony led Weisweiler's team to an all-conquering farewell season. With 86 goals scored, never before and never again achieved by the club, the team cruised to the league championship. In addition, Borussia won its first major European title when, after a 0–0 draw at home, they dismantled Twente 5–1 in the second leg of the UEFA Cup final. In all, Weisweiler had led Borussia to three Bundesliga titles, one German cup title, and a UEFA Cup title (as well as being runners-up on several occasions), establishing a side that throughout the 1970s rivalled Bayern Munich in their domestic achievements. Weisweiler was succeeded by Udo Lattek (who had managed Bayern Munich to many of their 1970s triumphs), Lattek led Borussia to consecutive league titles the next two years, and to the European Cup final against Liverpool in 1977, largely with players assembled by Weisweiler.

=== Barcelona ===
Weisweiler moved in the summer of 1975 to the Spanish top club Barcelona, replacing Rinus Michels, who returned to Holland after four years with the Catalans. When asked why he would leave Mönchengladbach at the height of his influence and success, he said in an interview: "I have shaped a team with my style. Now I'll try to enforce it in Spain."

With Barcelona, led by Dutch Stars Johan Cruyff and Johan Neeskens, Weisweiler's goal was to win the Spanish league and the European Champions Cup. However, from day one Cruyff and Weisweiler came into conflict. "Weisweiler is not the manager of my choice", stated the Dutch playmaker, who guessed he would not under Weisweiler get the freedom to play as he wanted to. In his year at the club Barcelona did not win any titles, and he returned to West Germany to take over 1. FC Köln, where he had started his managerial career.

=== FC Köln ===
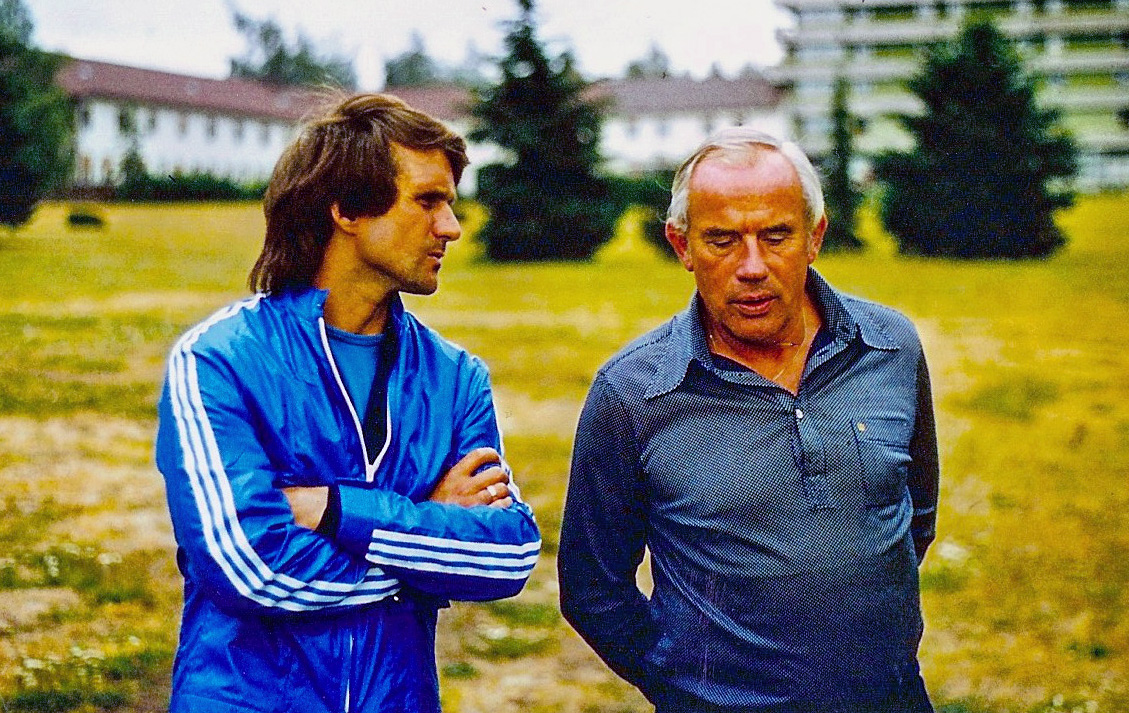
Weisweiler (right) with Wolfgang Overath in 1976

Weisweiler managed 1. FC Köln from 1976 to 1980. On the field Köln was backstopped by national team goalkeeper Harald Schumacher and led up front by top scorer Dieter Müller, but contained no recognized superstars. Nonetheless, the team competed for the major domestic trophies for most of Weismeiler's years. Köln won the German Cup in 1977, defeating Hertha BSC in the final, and again in 1978, defeating Fortuna Düsseldorf. Köln achieved the ultimate domestic success in winning the Bundesliga title in 1977–78. They finished ahead of Weismeiler's old team, Borussia Mönchengladbach, by the narrowest of margins, winning the title by virtue of superior goal difference. Neither Köln nor Borussia Mönchengladbach has won a league title since. The year after their title win, led by 20-year-old midfield sensation Bernd Schuster in his first full year with the club, Köln made it to the European Cup semi-final, losing 4–3 on aggregate to eventual champions Nottingham Forest when a goalless or low-scoring draw in the return home leg would have seen Köln to the final. Köln made it to the German Cup final again in 1980, but this time was defeated by Fortuna Düsseldorf. By then a young Pierre Littbarski had been eased into the first team as a scoring midfielder-winger. Littbarski did not play in the cup final, but in the role envisioned for him by Weisweiler went on to be a vital part of the West Germany national team that made it to three consecutive World Cup finals, including the 1990 victory.

=== New York Cosmos ===
Weisweiler took over as manager of the New York Cosmos five games into the 1980 North American Soccer League season. The team finished with a 24 and 8 record, and won the Soccer Bowl title, defeating the Fort Lauderdale Strikers 3–0 in the final. The next year the club made it to the final again, this time losing to the Chicago Sting in a shootout after a goalless regulation time and overtime. During Weisweiler's tenure at the Cosmos he managed stars Franz Beckenbauer, Carlos Alberto, Johan Neeskens and Giorgio Chinaglia at the veteran stage of their careers.

=== Grasshopper ===
Weisweiler managed the Swiss record champion Grasshopper in 1982–83, with whom he won a domestic double that season.

== Death ==
Weisweiler died of a heart attack at his home in Aesch, Switzerland, near Zurich, on 5 July 1983. He was 63.

== Coaching record ==
As of 20 January 2014

Team	From	To	Record					
Team	From	To	G	W	D	L	Win %	Ref.
1. FC Köln	1 July 1949	30 June 1952	90	46	16	28	51.11	
Rheydter SV	1 July 1952	30 June 1954						
1. FC Köln	1 July 1955	30 June 1958	93	45	22	26	48.39	
Borussia Mönchengladbach	27 April 1964	30 June 1975	459	237	117	105	51.63	
Barcelona	1 July 1975	30 June 1976	44	24	8	12	54.55	
1. FC Köln	1 July 1976	15 April 1980	171	95	36	40	55.56	
New York Cosmos	1 July 1980	31 December 1981						
Grasshopper	1 July 1982	5 July 1983						
Total			857	447	200	210	52.16	—

== Honours ==
=== Manager ===
Borussia Mönchengladbach

- Bundesliga: 1969–70, 1970–71, 1974–75; runner-up: 1973–74
- DFB-Pokal: 1972–73
- DFB-Ligapokal: runner-up 1972–73
- UEFA Cup: 1974–75, runner-up: 1972–73

FC Köln

- Bundesliga: 1977–78
- DFB-Pokal: 1976–77, 1977–78; runner-up: 1953–54

New York Cosmos

- North American Soccer League: 1980

Grasshopper

- Swiss Nationalliga A: 1982–83
- Swiss Cup: 1982–83

=== Individual ===
- FourFourTwo 69th Greatest Manager of All Time: 2020
- France Football 38th Greatest Manager of All Time: 2019
