= Dieter Zembski =

German footballer

Personal information
- Date of birth: 6 November 1946 (age 79)
- Place of birth: Bremen, Germany
- Height: 1.72 m (5 ft 8 in)
- Position: Defender

Youth career
- Union Bremen

Senior career*
Years	Team	Apps	(Gls)
1968–1975	Werder Bremen	179	(4)
1975–1980	Eintracht Braunschweig	122	(0)
Total		301	(4)

International career
1971	West Germany	1	(0)
- * Club domestic league appearances and goals

Dieter Zembski (born 6 November 1946) is a German former professional footballer who played as a defender. He spent 12 seasons in the Bundesliga with SV Werder Bremen and Eintracht Braunschweig.

== International career ==
Zembski represented West Germany once, in a friendly against Mexico in 1971. However, he could not establish himself in the national team against Berti Vogts and Paul Breitner and made no further appearances.

== Personal life ==
Before and after his professional football career, Zembski played in various rock bands. In 1965 he performed with his band The Mushroams, in which he played drums, on the Beat-Club music program on German national television.
