= Peter Meyer (footballer, born 1940) =

German footballer (1940–2026)

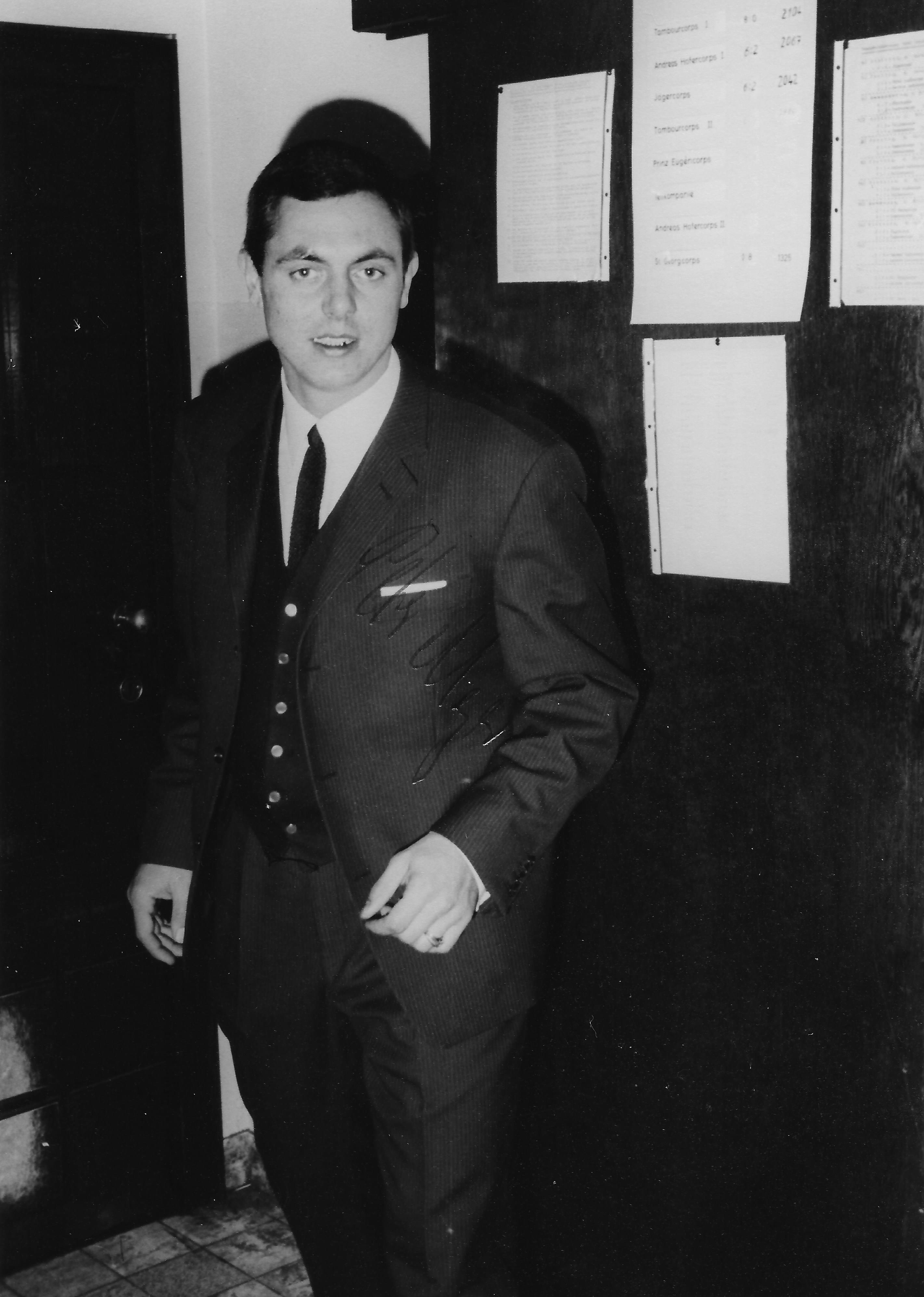
- Meyer in 1967

Personal information
- Date of birth: 18 February 1940
- Place of birth: Düsseldorf, Gau Düsseldorf, Germany
- Date of death: 11 February 2026 (aged 85)
- Height: 1.78 m (5 ft 10 in)
- Position: Striker

Youth career
- Wersten 04
- TuRU Düsseldorf

Senior career*
Years	Team	Apps	(Gls)
1960–1967	Fortuna Düsseldorf	174	(119)
1967–1970	Borussia Mönchengladbach	19	(19)
- VfL 06 Benrath
- Düsseldorfer SC Viktoria 02

International career
1967	Germany	1	(0)
- * Club domestic league appearances and goals

Peter Meyer (18 February 1940 – 11 February 2026) was a German professional footballer who played as a striker. He spent eight seasons in the Bundesliga with Fortuna Düsseldorf and Borussia Mönchengladbach. He also represented Germany once, in a UEFA Euro 1968 qualifier against Albania.

== Career ==
=== Fortuna Düsseldorf ===
Meyer started his career at Wersten 04 and TuRU Düsseldorf before joining Fortuna Düsseldorf in 1960. He played in the 1961–62 DFB-Pokal final with the club, losing 2–1 to 1. FC Nürnberg. In 1966, he helped Fortuna reach the Bundesliga for the first time, scoring twice in a 5–1 victory against Kickers Offenbach in the Aufstiegsrunde, securing the club's promotion on goal average. He appeared 25 times and scored eight goals during the following season in the Bundesliga, but could not prevent Fortuna from being relegated at the end of the campaign. Meyer was not offered a new contract following Fortuna's relegation, and was free to look for a new club. With a total of 119 goals in 174 league games between 1960 and 1967, he was the club's record goalscorer at the time of his death in 2026.

=== Borussia Mönchengladbach ===
After initially agreeing terms with MSV Duisburg, Meyer opted to sign for Borussia Mönchengladbach after being persuaded to join the club by Günter Netzer, who showed up at the car workshop that Meyer worked at. He debuted on 19 August 1967 against Schalke 04, scoring a hat trick in a 4–3 away win, and went on to score 19 goals for the club in the first half of the 1967–68 Bundesliga season. He was subsequently selected by Helmut Schön to play for West Germany in their decisive Euro 1968 qualification match against Albania in Tirana. West Germany failed to qualify after drawing the match 0–0, and the game became known as the "Disgrace of Tirana".

=== Injury and retirement ===
In January 1968, during a training match played in Duisburg, Meyer broke his tibia and fibula following a collision with his own goalkeeper Volker Danner. Meyer never fully recovered from the injury, and required a second operation after returning to training too soon after the incident. He made a brief comeback in August 1969, starting in a league match against Bayern Munich, but was substituted at half-time, and never made another appearance in the Bundesliga. He left the club at the end of the 1969–70 season and dropped into amateur football in his home city of Düsseldorf, joining VfL Benrath in the Verbandsliga Niederrhein, followed by Düsseldorfer SC Viktoria 02 before deciding to retire.

== Death ==
Meyer died in February 2026, at the age of 85.

== Honours ==
- Bundesliga champion: 1969–70

== Bibliography ==
- Bitter, Jürgen: Deutschlands Fußball-Nationalspieler: das Lexikon. SVB Sportverlag, Berlin 1997, ISBN 3-328-00749-0, pp. 314 f.
- Homann, Ulrich (Hrsg.): Höllenglut an Himmelfahrt. Die Geschichte der Aufstiegsrunden zur Fußballbundesliga 1963–1974. Klartext, Essen 1990, ISBN 3-88474-346-5.
- Karn, Christian; Reinhard Rehberg: Enzyklopädie des deutschen Ligafußballs. Band 9: Spielerlexikon 1963–1994. Bundesliga, Regionalliga, 2. Liga. AGON Sportverlag, Kassel 2012, ISBN 978-3-89784-214-4, p. 338.
- Landefeld, Harald; Achim Nöllenheidt (Hrsg.): Helmut, erzähl mich dat Tor... Neue Geschichten und Porträts aus der Oberliga West 1947–1963. Klartext, Essen 1993, ISBN 3-88474-043-1.
- Weinrich, Matthias: Enzyklopädie des deutschen Ligafußballs. Band 3: 35 Jahre Bundesliga. Teil 1. Die Gründerjahre 1963–1975. Geschichten, Bilder, Aufstellungen, Tabellen. AGON Sportverlag, Kassel 1998, ISBN 3-89784-132-0.
