= Hermann Erlhoff =

German footballer and coach (1944–2022)

Personal information
- Date of birth: 22 December 1944
- Place of birth: Herten, Germany
- Date of death: 17 February 2022 (aged 77)
- Height: 1.83 m (6 ft 0 in)
- Positions: Defender; midfielder

Senior career*
Years	Team	Apps	(Gls)
- TSV Marl-Hüls
1967–1970	Schalke 04	75	(8)
1970–1976	Rot-Weiss Essen	87	(7)
Total		162	(15)

Managerial career
- 1976–1978: Rot-Weiss Essen
- 2000–2001: FFC Flaesheim-Hillen
- * Club domestic league appearances and goals

Hermann Erlhoff (22 December 1944 – 17 February 2022) was a German professional football player and coach.

== Playing career ==
Erlhoff played as a defender and midfielder for TSV Marl-Hüls, FC Schalke 04 and Rot-Weiss Essen. He made a total of 162 appearances in the Bundesliga, scoring 15 goals. He was also the league's second ever substitute player.

== Coaching career ==
After retiring as a player in 1976, Erlhoff worked as a coach at Rot-Weiss Essen before becoming manager. He later coached at a number of amateur teams, including Rot-Weiß Oberhausen and SpVgg Erkenschwick. He also managed the women's team FFC Flaesheim-Hillen, whom he led to the final of the 2000–01 DFB-Pokal Frauen, which the club lost.

== Later life and death ==
Erlhoff later worked as a sports teacher. After having dementia, he died on 17 February 2022, at the age of 77.
