= Otto Geisert =

German footballer (1939–2021)

Personal information
- Date of birth: 18 November 1939
- Place of birth: Nordhorn, Hanover, Prussia, Germany
- Date of death: 8 January 2021 (aged 81)
- Place of death: Kaiserslautern, Rhineland-Palatinate, Germany
- Height: 1.80 m (5 ft 11 in)
- Position: Midfielder

Senior career*
Years	Team	Apps	(Gls)
–1962	Eintracht Nordhorn		
1962–1965	Karlsruher SC	45	(10)
1965–1970	1. FC Kaiserslautern	153	(21)
1970–1971	Charleroi		
1971–1974	FC Homburg		
- * Club domestic league appearances and goals

Otto Geisert (18 November 1939 – 8 January 2021) was a German footballer who played as a midfielder. He spent seven seasons in the Bundesliga with Karlsruher SC and 1. FC Kaiserslautern. The best league finish he achieved was a fifth place.

He died on 8 January 2021, aged 81, in Kaiserslautern.
