= Klaus-Dieter Sieloff =

German footballer (1942–2011)

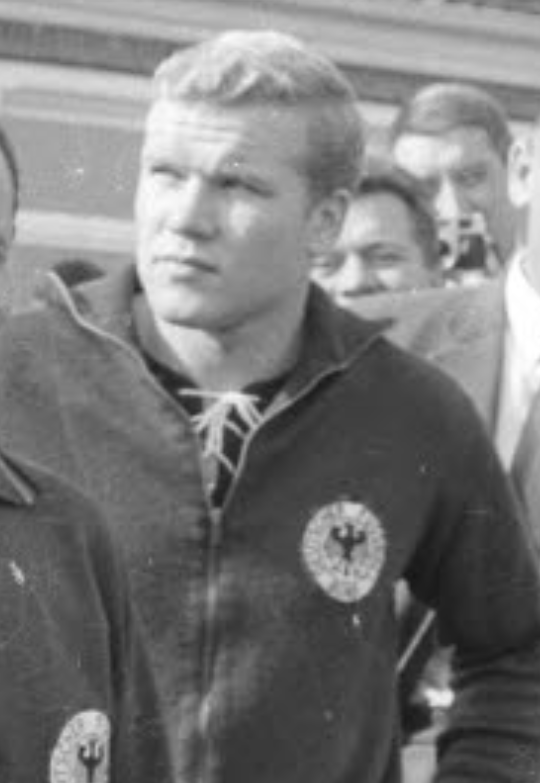
- Sieloff in 1965

Personal information
- Date of birth: 27 February 1942
- Place of birth: Tilsit, East Prussia, Germany
- Date of death: 13 December 2011 (aged 69)
- Place of death: Stuttgart, Germany
- Height: 1.78 m (5 ft 10 in)
- Positions: Defender; sweeper

Youth career
- –1954: Borussia Kiel
- 1954–1959: FV Rottweil 08
- 1959–1960: VfB Stuttgart

Senior career*
Years	Team	Apps	(Gls)
1960–1969	VfB Stuttgart	174	(22)
1969–1974	Borussia Mönchengladbach	123	(15)
1974–1976	Alemannia Aachen	42	(3)
1976–1977	TSG Backnang		
Total		338	(40)

International career
1964–1971	West Germany	14	(5)
Medal record
Men's football
Representing West Germany
FIFA World Cup
Runner-up	1966 England
Third place	1970 Mexico
- * Club domestic league appearances and goals

Klaus-Dieter Sieloff (27 February 1942 – 13 December 2011) was a German footballer who played as a defender. He spent 11 seasons in the Bundesliga with VfB Stuttgart and Borussia Mönchengladbach. He played in two World Cup Qualifying matches in 1966.

== Early life ==
During his youth in Kiel, Sieloff aimed to become a boxer, having stood in the ring 25 times by the age of 14. When his family moved to Rottweil near Stuttgart and after visiting football games of VfB Stuttgart at Neckarstadion, Sieloff's interest however shifted from boxing to football. In October 1960, he played his first game for VfB Stuttgart in the Oberliga Süd. There he soon became a fixture in the stopper position in Stuttgart's team.

== Career ==
Physically strong yet technically adept, Sieloff soon got the attention of West Germany national team coach Sepp Herberger, who first called him up for a 1964 friendly against Finland in Helsinki. During the next year, Sieloff became the standard sweeper of West Germany. As a player, Sieloff became known for surging forward from the sweeper position, often scoring with long range shots.

Unfortunately for Sieloff, he lost his starting place in the West Germany national team during the 1965–66 season and thus did not feature in the 1966 FIFA World Cup. During the next four years, the sweeper position was usually that of either Willi Schulz or Karl-Heinz Schnellinger and thus Sieloff did not gain anymore caps up to 1970. After the 1970 FIFA World Cup, with Schulz retiring from international play and Schnellinger not featuring regularly in the German lineups due to playing abroad, Sieloff revived his international career, which was also fostered by his success at club level with Borussia Mönchengladbach.

In 1969, Sieloff had made the change from VfB Stuttgart to Borussia Mönchengladbach. Their coach Hennes Weisweiler intended to strengthen the defense of his young team, which was already very strong offensively, but lacked the defensive thoroughness to succeed in a long league campaign. For the 1969–70 season, Mönchengladbach added Sieloff as sweeper as well as Ludwig Müller as the stopper. With the defense strengthened, Borussia Mönchengladbach won the 1969–70 and the 1970–71 Bundesliga seasons.

With Sieloff being one of the celebrated stars of the team, he made his comeback for West Germany in April 1970 in a friendly against Romania. After the 1970 World Cup, with Schulz retired, Sieloff once again became the starting sweeper of West Germany. However, during 1971 it became apparent that Franz Beckenbauer, who previously played in midfield, was the strongest option at the sweeper position, which meant the end of Sieloff's international career after 14 appearances.

For Borussia Mönchengladbach, Sieloff played until 1974 when he moved to Alemannia Aachen, where he remained until 1976. He ended his career in 1977, playing one season for TSG Backnang. After his career, Sieloff became chief of the Mercedes-Benz company-facilitated sports activities group. He died in December 2011.

== Honours ==
Borussia Mönchengladbach

- Bundesliga: 1969–70, 1970–71
- DFB-Pokal: 1972–73
- UEFA Cup finalist: 1972–73

West Germany

- FIFA World Cup: runner-up 1966; third place 1970
