= Egon Milder =

German footballer (1942–1975)

Personal information
- Date of birth: 22 April 1942
- Date of death: 18 October 1975 (aged 33)
- Place of death: Lucerne, Switzerland
- Height: 1.83 m (6 ft 0 in)
- Positions: Defender; midfielder

Youth career
- –1961: SuS Kaiserau

Senior career*
Years	Team	Apps	(Gls)
1961–1962	SuS Kaiserau		
1962–1963	VfL Bochum	23	(3)
1963–1969	Borussia Mönchengladbach	183	(19)
1969–?	FC Luzern		
- FC Kriens

Managerial career
- FC Kriens
- * Club domestic league appearances and goals

Egon Milder (22 April 1942 – 18 October 1975) was a German footballer who played as a defender or midfielder. He spent four seasons in the Bundesliga with Borussia Mönchengladbach.

== Career statistics ==
Club performance			League		Cup		Other		Total	
Season	Club	League	Apps	Goals	Apps	Goals	Apps	Goals	Apps	Goals
West Germany			League		DFB-Pokal		Other^{1}		Total	
1961–62	SuS Kaiserau	Bezirksliga Westfalen			—		—			
1962–63	VfL Bochum	2. Oberliga West	23	3	—		—		23	3
1963–64	Borussia Mönchengladbach	Regionalliga West	29	1	1	0	—		30	1
1964–65	Borussia Mönchengladbach	Regionalliga West	31	7	—		5	1	36	8
1965–66	Borussia Mönchengladbach	Bundesliga	22	5	1	0	—		23	5
1966–67	Borussia Mönchengladbach	Bundesliga	34	2	1	1	—		35	3
1967–68	Borussia Mönchengladbach	Bundesliga	34	0	3	0	—		37	0
1968–69	Borussia Mönchengladbach	Bundesliga	33	4	2	1	—		35	5
Switzerland			League		Swiss Cup		Other		Total	
1969–70	FC Luzern	Nationalliga B					—			
	FC Luzern						—			
	FC Kriens						—			
Total	West Germany				8	2	5	1		
Total	Switzerland						0	0		
Career total							5	1		

^{1} 1964–65 includes the Regionalliga promotion playoffs.
