= Werner Kaiser =

German footballer

Personal information
- Date of birth: 29 August 1949 (age 77)
- Position: Striker

Senior career*
Years	Team	Apps	(Gls)
1969–1970	Borussia Mönchengladbach	10	(4)
1970–1971	1. FC Saarbrücken		
- * Club domestic league appearances and goals

Werner Kaiser (born 29 August 1949) is a retired German football player. He spent one season in the Fußball-Bundesliga with Borussia Mönchengladbach.

== Honours ==
- Bundesliga champion: 1969–70
