= Peter Kracke =

German footballer (1943–1993)

Personal information
- Date of birth: 1 June 1943
- Place of birth: Velbert, Germany
- Date of death: 15 November 1993 (aged 50)
- Height: 1.70 m (5 ft 7 in)
- Position: Striker

Youth career
- –1969: SSVg Velbert

Senior career*
Years	Team	Apps	(Gls)
1969–1970	Borussia Mönchengladbach	2	(0)
1970–1971	1. FC Saarbrücken		
1971–1972	AS Angoulême	16	(2)
1972–1974	DJK Gütersloh		
- * Club domestic league appearances and goals

Peter Kracke (1 June 1943 – 15 November 1993) was a German professional footballer who played as a striker. He spent one season in the Bundesliga with Borussia Mönchengladbach.

== Honours ==
Borussia Mönchengladbach

- Bundesliga: 1969–70
