= Gerd Zimmermann (footballer) =

German footballer (1949–2022)

Personal information
- Date of birth: 26 September 1949
- Place of birth: Jüchen, North Rhine-Westphalia, West Germany
- Date of death: 6 April 2022 (aged 72)
- Height: 1.84 m (6 ft 0 in)
- Positions: Defender; midfielder

Senior career*
Years	Team	Apps	(Gls)
1968–1970	Borussia Mönchengladbach	8	(0)
1970–1974	Fortuna Köln		
1974–1980	Fortuna Düsseldorf	166	(40)
1980	Houston Hurricane	10	(2)
1980–1981	Calgary Boomers indoor	6	(6)
1981	Calgary Boomers	27	(3)
1981–1982	Union Solingen	9	(2)
1982–1983	Fortuna Köln		
- * Club domestic league appearances and goals

Gerd Zimmermann (26 September 1949 – 6 April 2022) was a German footballer. He spent nine seasons in the Bundesliga with Borussia Mönchengladbach, SC Fortuna Köln and Fortuna Düsseldorf. He spent two years in the North American Soccer League playing for the Houston Hurricane and the Calgary Boomers before returning to Germany to close out his career.

== Honours ==
Borussia Mönchengladbach

- Bundesliga: 1969–70

Fortuna Düsseldorf

- European Cup Winners' Cup finalist: 1978–79
- DFB-Pokal: 1978–79, 1979–80; runner-up 1977–78

Fortuna Köln

- DFB-Pokal: runner-up 1982–83
