= Hans-Jürgen Wloka =

German footballer

Personal information
- Date of birth: September 12, 1951 (age 75)
- Positions: Midfielder; striker

Senior career*
Years	Team	Apps	(Gls)
1970–1972	Borussia Mönchengladbach	29	(3)
1972–1974	Arminia Bielefeld	59	(6)
1974–1979	Bayer Uerdingen	162	(27)
1979–1980	Arminia Hannover	17	(1)
1980–1985	Rot-Weiß Oberhausen	103	(5)
- * Club domestic league appearances and goals

Hans-Jürgen Wloka (born September 12, 1951) is a German former footballer who spent 3 seasons in the Bundesliga with Borussia Mönchengladbach and Bayer Uerdingen.

== Honours ==
- Bundesliga champion: 1971.
