= Herbert Laumen =

German footballer

Personal information
- Date of birth: 11 August 1943 (age 83)
- Place of birth: Mönchengladbach, Germany
- Height: 1.73 m (5 ft 8 in)
- Position: Striker

Senior career*
| Years | Team | Apps | (Gls) |
| 1962–1971 | Borussia Mönchengladbach | 247 | (118) |
| 1971–1973 | Werder Bremen | 60 | (18) |
| 1973–1974 | 1. FC Kaiserslautern | 21 | (6) |
| 1974–1975 | Metz | 19 | (5) |
| 1975–1976 | Neu-Isenburg | | |
| 1976–1980 | Weseler SV | | |

International career
| 1968 | West Germany | 2 | (1) |
- * Club domestic league appearances and goals

Herbert Laumen (born 11 August 1943) is a German former professional footballer who played as a striker.

He scored more than 120 Bundesliga goals.

Laumen won two caps for the West Germany national team in the late 1960s.

== Honours ==
Borussia Mönchengladbach

- Bundesliga: 1969–70, 1970–71
