= Volker Danner =

German footballer (1942–2005)

Personal information
- Date of birth: 21 August 1942
- Date of death: 14 March 2005 (aged 62)
- Place of death: Wesel, Germany
- Height: 1.82 m (6 ft 0 in)
- Position: Goalkeeper

Senior career*
Years	Team	Apps	(Gls)
1963–1966	1. FC Saarbrücken		
1966–1970	Borussia Mönchengladbach	93	(0)
1970–1973	MSV Duisburg	62	(0)
1973–1974	Hamburger SV	0	(0)
- SC Wesel
- * Club domestic league appearances and goals

Volker Danner (21 August 1942 – 14 March 2005) was a German professional footballer who played as a goalkeeper. He spent nine seasons in the Bundesliga with 1. FC Saarbrücken, Borussia Mönchengladbach, MSV Duisburg and Hamburger SV.

== Honours ==
Borussia Mönchengladbach

- Bundesliga: 1969–70

Hamburger SV

- DFB-Pokal finalist: 1973–74
