= Horst Köppel =

German footballer and manager (born 1948)

Personal information
- Date of birth: 17 May 1948 (age 78)
- Place of birth: Stuttgart, Germany
- Height: 1.77 m (5 ft 10 in)
- Positions: Striker; midfielder

Youth career
- 1953–1958: SpVgg Neuwirtshaus
- 1958–1964: FV Zuffenhausen
- 1964–1966: VfB Stuttgart

Senior career*
Years	Team	Apps	(Gls)
1966–1968	VfB Stuttgart	61	(25)
1968–1971	Borussia Mönchengladbach	100	(23)
1971–1973	VfB Stuttgart	63	(19)
1973–1979	Borussia Mönchengladbach	84	(16)
1976	→ Vancouver Whitecaps (loan)	12	(1)
1977	→ Vancouver Whitecaps (loan)	8	(0)
1979–1981	1. FC Viersen		

International career
	West Germany Amateurs	2	(1)
1966–1972	West Germany U-23	9	(2)
	West Germany B	1	(2)
1968–1973	West Germany	11	(2)

Managerial career
- 1979–1981: 1. FC Viersen
- 1981–1982: 1. FC Köln (assistant)
- 1982–1983: Arminia Bielefeld
- 1983–1987: West Germany (assistant)
- 1987: Bayer 05 Uerdingen
- 1988–1991: Borussia Dortmund
- 1992: Fortuna Düsseldorf
- 1993–1994: FC Tirol Innsbruck
- 1994–1995: Eintracht Frankfurt (assistant)
- 1997: Urawa Red Diamonds
- 1997: Borussia Dortmund (scout)
- 2001–2004: Borussia Dortmund II
- 2004: Borussia Mönchengladbach II
- 2004: Borussia Mönchengladbach (caretaker)
- 2004–2005: Borussia Mönchengladbach II
- 2005–2006: Borussia Mönchengladbach
- 2006: Al-Wahda FC
- 2009: Ingolstadt 04
Medal record
Representing West Germany
UEFA European Championship
Winner	1972 Belgium
- * Club domestic league appearances and goals

Horst Köppel (born 17 May 1948) is a German football manager and former player who last worked as manager for FC Ingolstadt 04 in 2009.

== Playing career ==
Köppel scored 83 goals in the West German top-flight.

For the West Germany national team he collected 11 caps.

== Managerial career ==
=== Arminia Bielefeld ===
Köppel was manager of Arminia Bielefeld between 1 July 1982 and 30 June 1983.

=== Bayer 05 Uerdingen ===
Köppel was manager of Bayer 05 Uerdingen from 1 July 1987 to 1 December 1987. Köppel was replaced by Rolf Schafstall.

=== Borussia Dortmund ===
Köppel managed Borussia Dortmund from 1 July 1988 to 30 June 1991.

=== Fortuna Düsseldorf ===
Köppel managed Fortuna Düsseldorf from 26 March 1992 to 10 August 1992.

=== Tirol Innsbruck ===
Köppel managed Tirol Innsbruck from 1 July 1993 to 15 May 1994.

=== Urawa Red Diamonds ===
Köppel managed Urawa Red Diamonds from 1 February 1997 to 31 December 1997.

=== Borussia Dortmund II ===
Köppel officially took over as manager of Borussia Dortmund II on 1 July 2001. Köppel was manager until 30 June 2004 when he decided to join Borussia Mönchengladbach's reserve side.

=== Borussia Mönchengladbach ===
Köppel became manager of Borussia Mönchengladbach II on 1 July 2004. He became caretaker manager of Borussia Mönchengladbach on 27 October 2004. Dick Advocaat was hired as the new manager, ending Köppel's stint as caretaker manager, on 1 November 2004. Köppel returned to the reserve team on 2 November 2004. Köppel became manager of the senior squad after Advocaat resigned as manager of the club on 18 April 2005. Köppel was sacked on 16 May 2006.

=== Al-Wahda FC ===
Köppel became manager of Al-Wahda FC on 5 August 2006. Köppel was sacked on 11 October 2006.

=== Ingolstadt 04 ===
Köppel became manager of Ingolstadt 04 on 27 April 2009. Köppel was sacked on 10 November 2009.

== Managerial statistics ==
As of 22 January 2014

Team	From	To	Record					
Team	From	To	G	W	D	L	Win %	Ref.
Arminia Bielefeld	1 July 1982	30 June 1983	38	14	8	16	36.84	
Bayer Uerdingen	1 July 1987	1 December 1987	20	7	3	10	35.00	
Borussia Dortmund	1 July 1988	30 June 1991	121	51	39	31	42.15	
Fortuna Düsseldorf	26 March 1992	10 August 1992	16	1	5	10	6.25	
Tirol Innsbruck	1 July 1993	15 May 1994	41	17	12	12	41.46	
Urawa Reds	1 February 1997	31 December 1997	32	17	0	15	53.13	
Borussia Dortmund II	1 July 2001	30 June 2004	102	49	25	28	48.04	
Borussia Mönchengladbach II	1 July 2004	27 October 2004	12	8	2	2	66.67	
Borussia Mönchengladbach	27 October 2004	1 November 2004	1	1	0	0	100.00	
Borussia Mönchengladbach II	2 November 2004	18 April 2005	14	8	4	2	57.14	
Borussia Mönchengladbach	18 April 2005	16 May 2006	41	12	15	14	29.27	
Al-Wahda FC	5 August 2006	11 October 2006	4	2	0	2	50.00	
Ingolstadt 04	27 April 2009	10 November 2009	22	8	4	10	36.36	
Total			464	195	117	152	42.03	—

== Honours ==
=== Player ===
- UEFA Euro 1972 winner
- European Cup runner-up: 1976–77
- UEFA Cup winner: 1974–75, 1978–79
- Bundesliga champion: 1969–70, 1970–71, 1974–75, 1975–76, 1976–77
- Bundesliga runner-up: 1973–74, 1977–78

=== Coach ===
- DFB-Pokal: 1988–89
- DFL-Supercup: 1989
