= Niederrheinstadion =

Multi-purpose stadium in Oberhausen, Germany

Stadion Niederrhein
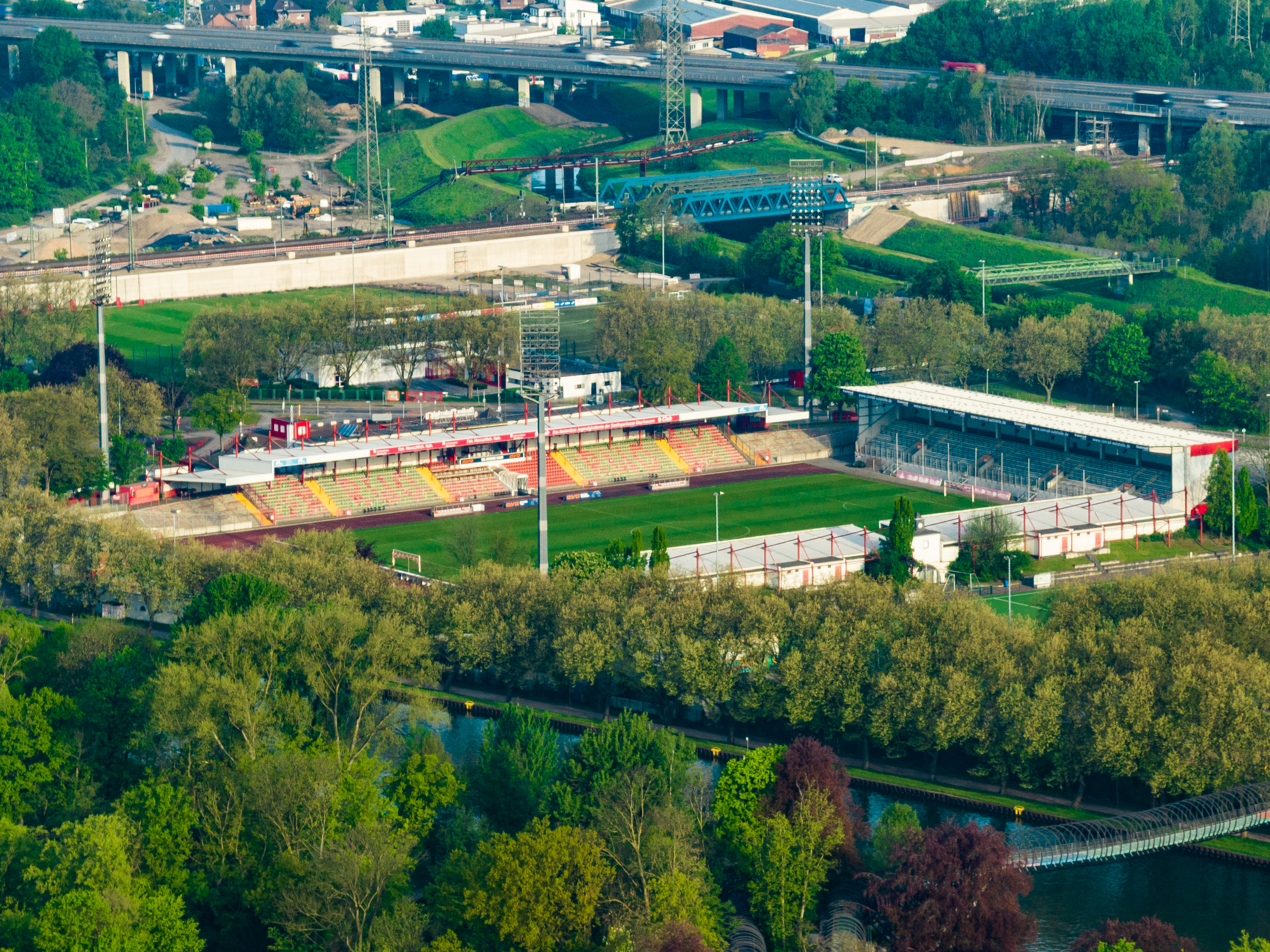
- Aerial view of Stadion Niederrhein
- Interactive map of Stadion Niederrhein
- Former names: Städtisches Stadion am Gräfenbusch
- Location: Lindnerstraße 2–6; 46149 Oberhausen, Germany
- Coordinates: 51°29′37″N 6°51′16″E
- Owner: City of Oberhausen
- Capacity: 17,165
- Surface: Grass
- Record attendance: 44-48,000 (18 June 1950)

Construction
- Groundbreaking: 27 June 1924; 102 years ago
- Opened: 28 February 1926; 100 years ago
- Renovated: 1982, 1996, 2018

Tenant
- Rot-Weiß Oberhausen

Niederrheinstadion or Stadion Niederrhein is a multi-purpose stadium in Oberhausen, Germany. It is currently used mostly for football matches and is the home stadium of Rot-Weiß Oberhausen. The stadium currently has a capacity of 17,165 spectators (4,000 seats).

== History ==
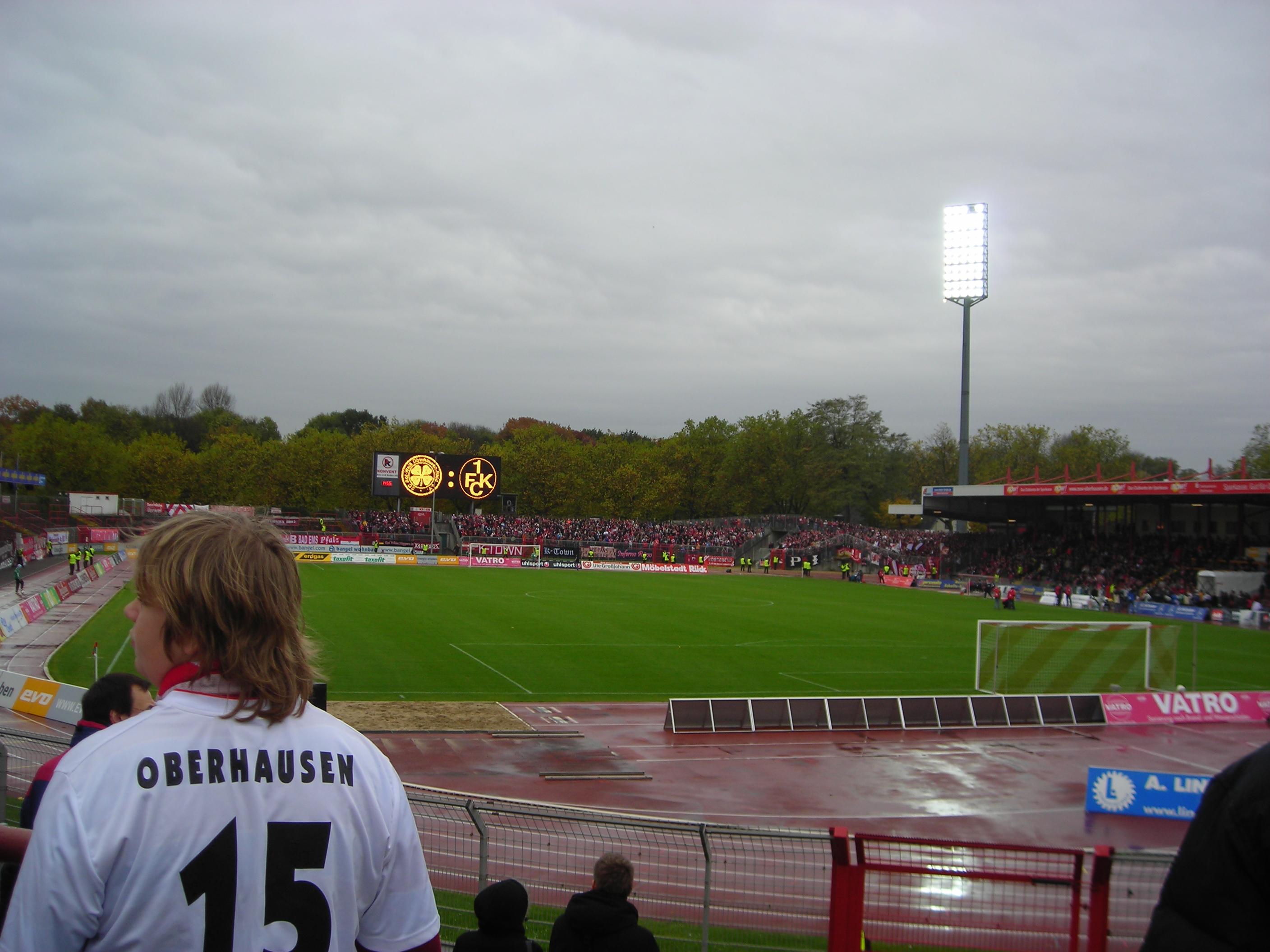
Stadion Niederrhein

The stadium was officially opened on February 28, 1926, with a match between Duisburger SV and Arminia Bielefeld. At that time, it was called "Städtisches Stadion am Gräfenbusch", before being renamed to Stadion Niederrhein three years later, a name which has not been changed since.

From the year 1970 on, the at the time brightest floodlights in a European stadium provided enough light to allow color television broadcasts for the first time. 1982, tartan tracks were added, and in the year 1996 the old scoreboard from the Ulrich-Haberland-Stadion in Leverkusen was installed, a gift from Bayer 04 Leverkusen to the city of Oberhausen. In the two following years, the standing and the main terrace were renovated. The construction works were finished in 1998 and the stadium was reopened in time for the new season of the 2. Bundesliga.

With Rot-Weiß Oberhausen being promoted to 2. Bundesliga in 2008, again renovations were needed to meet the requirements from the DFL. As part of this, the turf was replaced completely and undersoil heating was installed. At the beginning of the year 2017, works to replace parts of the old standing area began. The new standing terraces were opened in 2018.

== Other uses ==
The stadium was one of the four grounds of the 2004 UEFA European Under-21 Championship. Three group stage matches, one semi-final and the match for third place took place in Oberhausen. At the INAS World Football Championships 2006 for athletes with intellectual disabilities two years later, the match between France and Hungary (1:3) was hosted in the Stadion Niederrhein. In the 2009/10 season of the UEFA Women's Champions League, the women's football club FCR 2001 Duisburg held two of their home matches in Oberhausen, because the floodlights in the PCC-Stadion in Duisburg did not satisfy the UEFA requirements.

Major motorcycle speedway events took place at the stadium including rounds of the Speedway World Championship in 1956 and 1958.

== Records ==
In 1950, the record attendance of around 45,000 spectators was achieved when Preußen Dellbrück and Kickers Offenbach met in the semi-final for the German championship. The match ended with a 3:0 win for Offenbach.

== Transport ==
Stadion Niederrhein can be reached by bus. There is a number of stations in the surrounding area, with the closest to the stadium being "Schloss Oberhausen" on line 122. On matchdays, additional direct busses to transport fans from the train stations Oberhausen, Sterkrade, and Osterfeld to the stadium are provided.
