= Peter Dietrich =

German footballer

Personal information
- Date of birth: 6 March 1944 (age 82)
- Place of birth: Neu-Isenburg, Germany
- Height: 1.77 m (5 ft 10 in)
- Position: Midfielder

Youth career
- SpVgg Neu-Isenburg

Senior career*
Years	Team	Apps	(Gls)
1963–1964	SpVgg Neu-Isenburg		
1964–1966	ESV Ingolstadt		
1966–1967	Rot-Weiss Essen	28	(3)
1967–1971	Borussia Mönchengladbach	103	(14)
1971–1976	Werder Bremen	82	(7)

International career
1970	West Germany	1	(0)
Medal record
Men's football
Representing West Germany
FIFA World Cup
Third place	1970 Mexico
- * Club domestic league appearances and goals

Peter Dietrich (born 6 March 1944 in Neu-Isenburg) is a German former footballer who played as a midfielder.

Dietrich won his lone cap for West Germany straight before the 1970 FIFA World Cup, but did not add any further international match to his tally before his retirement.
