= Heinz Wittmann =

German footballer

Personal information
- Date of birth: September 12, 1943 (age 83)
- Height: 1.75 m (5 ft 9 in)
- Position: Defender

Senior career*
Years	Team	Apps	(Gls)
1964–1965	SC Zwiesel		
1965–1973	Borussia Mönchengladbach	123	(0)
- * Club domestic league appearances and goals

Heinz Wittmann (born September 12, 1943) is a German former footballer who spent 8 seasons in the Bundesliga with Borussia Mönchengladbach.

== Honours ==
- UEFA Cup finalist: 1973.
- Bundesliga champion: 1970, 1971.
- DFB-Pokal winner: 1973.
