= Wolfgang Kleff =

German footballer

Personal information
- Full name: Wolfgang Kleff
- Date of birth: 16 November 1946 (age 79)
- Place of birth: Schwerte, Germany
- Height: 1.80 m (5 ft 11 in)
- Position: Goalkeeper

Youth career
- VfL Schwerte

Senior career*
Years	Team	Apps	(Gls)
1968–1979	Borussia Mönchengladbach	272	(0)
1979–1980	Hertha BSC	33	(0)
1980–1982	Borussia Mönchengladbach	49	(0)
1982–1984	Fortuna Düsseldorf	59	(0)
1984–1985	Rot-Weiß Oberhausen	31	(0)
1985–1986	VfL Bochum	20	(0)
1986–1987	FSV Salmrohr	25	(0)
1987–1992	SV Straelen	58	(0)
1999–2000	KFC Uerdingen	0	(0)
2007–2008	FC Rheinbach	1	(0)
Total		548	(0)

International career
1971–1973	West Germany	6	(0)
Medal record
Men's football
Representing West Germany
FIFA World Cup
Winner	1974 West Germany
UEFA European Championship
Winner	1972 Belgium
- * Club domestic league appearances and goals

Wolfgang Kleff (born 16 November 1946) is a German former professional footballer who played as a goalkeeper.

== Club career ==
Kleff was born in Schwerte, North Rhine-Westphalia. He joined Borussia Mönchengladbach from amateur outfit VfL Schwerte, where he was not a regular starter, in 1968 to become the leading goalkeeper of the Bundesliga side until injuries forced him to lay-off periods in the late 1970s. From 1968 to 1976 he did not miss any domestic game of Borussia Mönchengladbach and was able to lift five Bundesliga titles (1969–70, 1970–71, 1974–75, 1975–76, 1976–77) one DFB-Pokal (1972–73) and one UEFA Cup (1974–75) trophy with Die Fohlen. He was also in the Borussia Mönchengladbach team which lost to Liverpool in the 1973 UEFA Cup Final in and the 1976–77 European Cup. He was also part of the Mönchengladbach team which won the 1978–79 UEFA Cup.

After a season at Hertha BSC, he returned to Mönchengladbach, Kleff played two more years in the Bundesliga for his old club, joining local rival Fortuna Düsseldorf for two years in 1982. After a fall-out with Düsseldorf he joined Rot-Weiß Oberhausen of the 2. Bundesliga and was on the verge of becoming 40 years of age when he enjoyed one more year in the best German division with VfL Bochum. At the age of forty Kleff played the majority of games for promoted FSV Salmrohr in the 1986–87 2. Bundesliga. The season ended in swift relegation for Salmrohr and in Kleff's decision to hang up his gloves. However, for some time he continued to be a goalkeeper for amateurs such as SV Straelen.

At the end of his career, Kleff made a total of 433 appearances in the Bundesliga and 56 games in the 2. Bundesliga.

== International career ==
Kleff's international career with the West Germany national team was limited due to his competitor Sepp Maier occupying the role of West Germany's leading goalkeeper in that decade. Kleff won six caps for his country in between 1971 and 1974, the first of which took place in Oslo on 22 June 1971, a 7–1 defeat of Norway in a post-season friendly. Kleff won the 1972 UEFA European Championship trophy in Brussels and the 1974 FIFA World Cup.

== Post-playing life ==
Kleff's resemblance to German actor and comedian Otto Waalkes earned him the nickname "Otto" and minor roles in films such as Otto – Der Film (Otto – The Movie) in 1985 and Werner – Beinhart! in 1990.

== Honours ==
Borussia Mönchengladbach

- Bundesliga: 1969–70, 1970–71, 1974–75, 1975–76, 1976–77
- DFB-Pokal: 1972–73
- UEFA Cup: 1974–75, 1978–79

Germany

- UEFA European Championship: 1972
- FIFA World Cup: 1974
