= Erwin Spinnler =

German footballer

Personal information
- Date of birth: 11 April 1947 (age 79)
- Height: 1.78 m (5 ft 10 in)
- Positions: Striker; defender

Senior career*
Years	Team	Apps	(Gls)
1965–1970	Borussia Mönchengladbach	45	(0)
1970–1971	Kickers Offenbach	12	(0)
- * Club domestic league appearances and goals as of 21:16, 17 February 2009 (UTC)

Erwin Spinnler (born 11 April 1947) is a retired German football player. He spent 6 seasons in the Bundesliga with Borussia Mönchengladbach and Kickers Offenbach.

== Honours ==
- Bundesliga champion: 1970.
