= Ludwig Müller (footballer) =

German footballer (1941–2021)

Personal information
- Date of birth: 25 August 1941
- Place of birth: Haßfurt, Bavaria, Germany
- Date of death: 24 June 2021 (aged 79)
- Place of death: Haßfurt, Bavaria, Germany
- Height: 1.78 m (5 ft 10 in)
- Position: Defender

Youth career
- 1950–1960: 1. FC Haßfurt

Senior career*
Years	Team	Apps	(Gls)
1960–1964	1. FC Haßfurt		
1964–1969	1. FC Nürnberg	136	(10)
1969–1972	Borussia Mönchengladbach	81	(6)
1972–1975	Hertha BSC	97	(10)

International career
1968–1969	West Germany	6	(0)
- * Club domestic league appearances and goals

Ludwig 'Luggi' Müller (25 August 1941 – 24 June 2021) was a German professional footballer who played as a defender.

== Club career ==
He spent 11 seasons in the Bundesliga with 1. FC Nürnberg, Borussia Mönchengladbach and Hertha BSC.

== International career ==
Müller also played six games for the West Germany national team, including a 1970 FIFA World Cup qualifier against Cyprus and five friendlies.

== Life after pro times ==
He died on 24 June 2021 aged 79 in his home town of Haßfurt.

== Honours ==
- Bundesliga: 1967–68, 1969–70, 1970–71
