= Hartwig Bleidick =

German footballer (born 1944)

Personal information
- Date of birth: 26 December 1944 (age 81)
- Place of birth: Soest, Germany
- Height: 1.76 m (5 ft 9 in)
- Position: Defender

Youth career
- –1968: Soester SV

Senior career*
Years	Team	Apps	(Gls)
1968–1973	Borussia Mönchengladbach	114	(6)

International career
1968–1972	West Germany Amateur	32	(2)
1971	West Germany	2	(0)
- * Club domestic league appearances and goals

Hartwig Bleidick (born 26 December 1944) is a former football defender.
