= Wedaustadion =

Stadium in Duisburg, Germany

Coordinates: 51°24′32.52″N 6°46′43.19″E

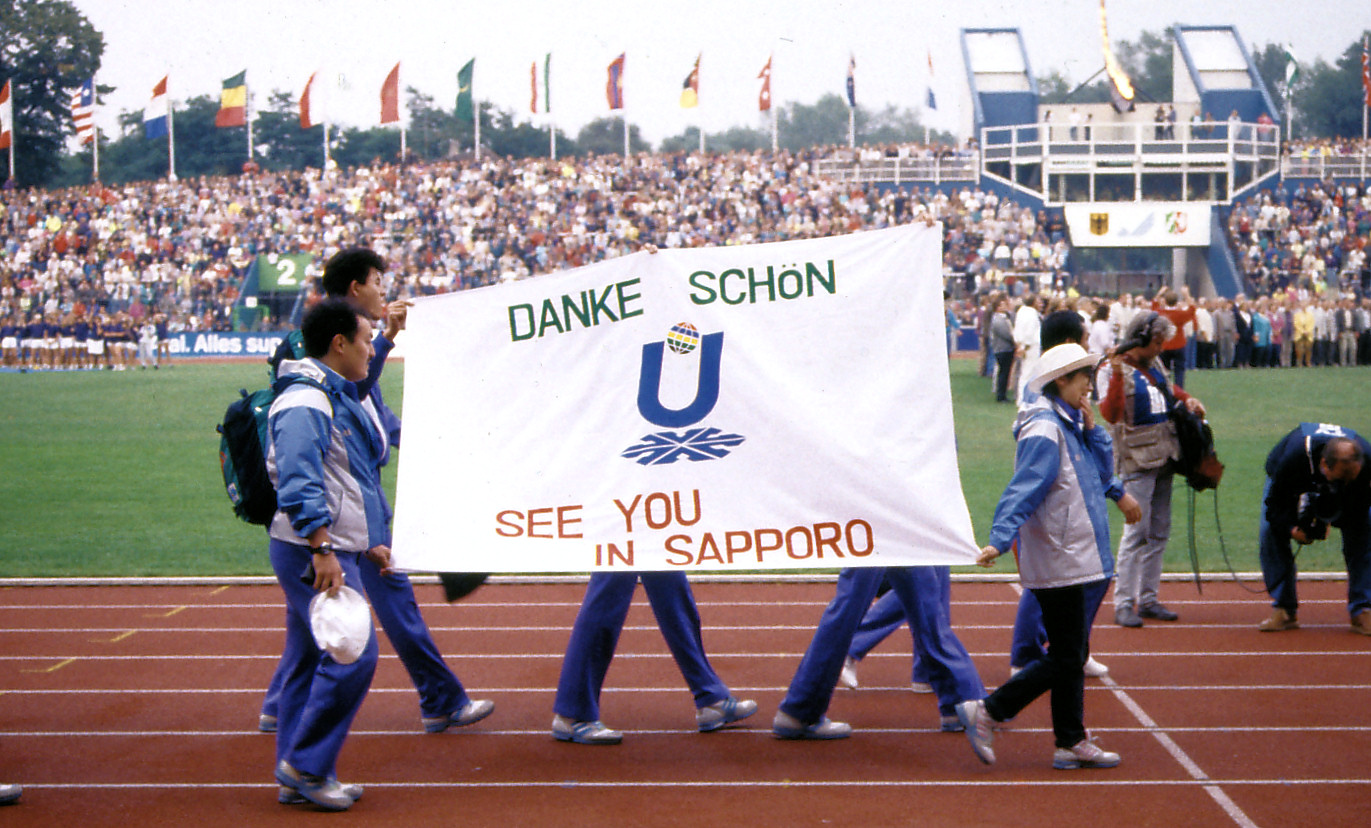
- Wedaustadion in 1989
- Interactive map of Wedaustadion
- Location: Duisburg, Germany
- Capacity: 30,112
- Surface: Grass

Construction
- Opened: 1921
- Closed: 2003
- Demolished: 2003

Tenant
- MSV Duisburg

Wedaustadion was a multi-purpose stadium in Duisburg, Germany. It was the home ground for MSV Duisburg until the club moved to the new MSV-Arena after the 2003–04 season. The stadium held 30,112. It was built in 1921 and was the second biggest stadium in Germany at the time.

Preceded by —	Home of MSV Duisburg; 1921–2003	Succeeded by MSV-Arena; 2004–present

Preceded by Maksimir Stadium; Yugoslavia	Universiade; 1989	Succeeded by Don Valley Stadium; UK
