= Georg-Melches-Stadion =

Football stadium

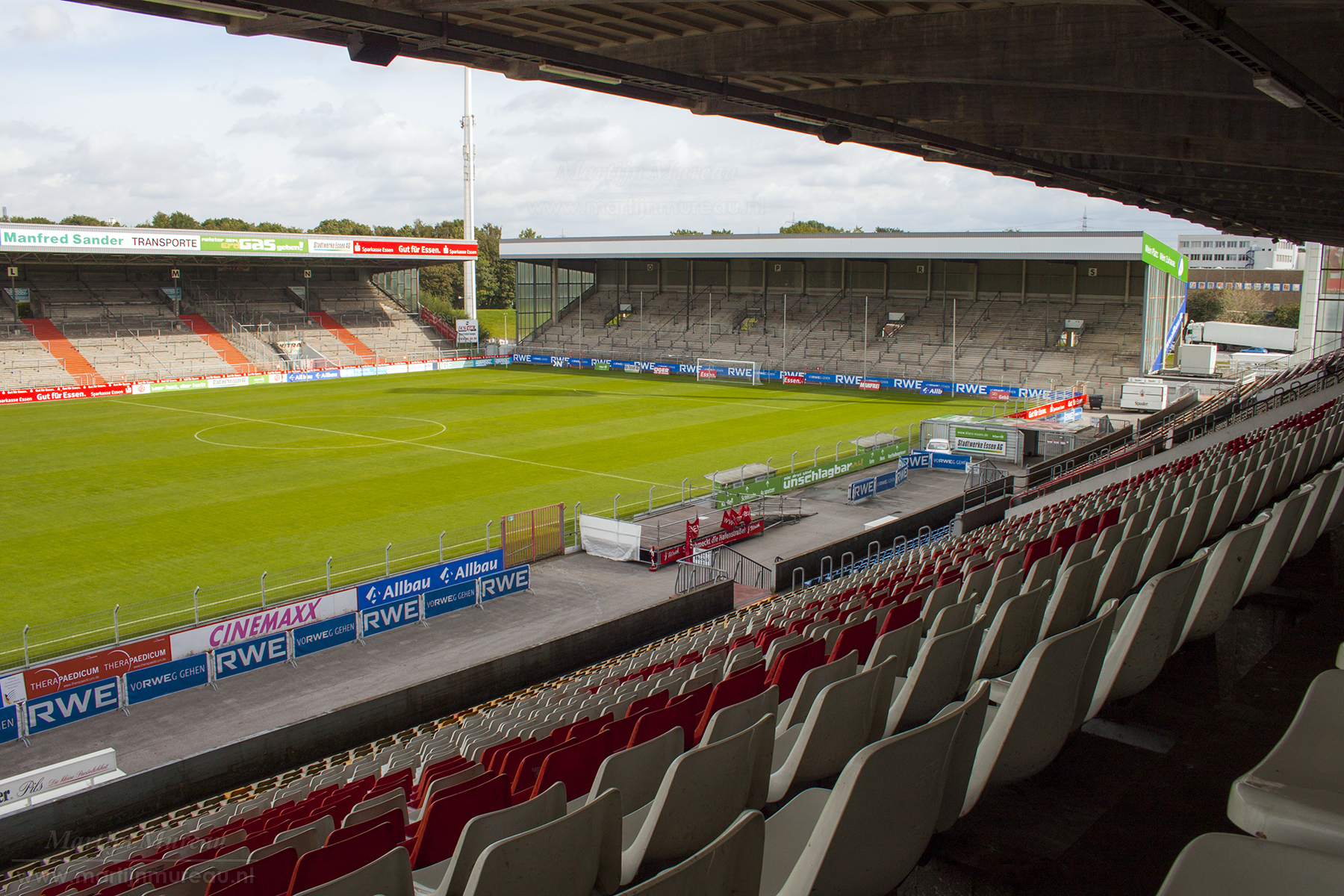
- Interactive map of Georg-Melches-Stadion
- Former names: Stadion Phönixstrasse (1923–1937); Stadion Rot-Weiss (1937–1939); Stadion an der Hafenstrasse (1939–1964)
- Location: Hafenstrasse 97a 45356 Essen; Germany
- Coordinates: 51°29′09″N 6°58′40″E
- Owner: Municipality of Essen
- Capacity: 15,000
- Surface: Grass
- Field size: 105 × 68 m

Construction
- Built: 1923
- Opened: 1923
- Renovated: 1939, 1948, 1954, 1977, 1994, 2005
- Closed: 19 May 2012
- Demolished: 21 May 2012

Tenants
- Rot-Weiss Essen (1939–2012); Germany national football team (Selected matches)

Georg-Melches-Stadion was a stadium in Essen, Germany. It was built in 1923, renovated to the former state in 1939, 1948 and 1954 and had a capacity of 30,000. Due to safety reasons this was reduced to 15,000 from 1994 onwards. It was used, mostly, for football matches of Rot-Weiss Essen and concerts. The stadium was demolished by August 2012.

In 1920, the predecessor of Rot-Weiss Essen bought a piece of land at the PHönixstrasse (which was later renamed to Hafenstrasse). After the purchase it appeared that the land was too short to build a stadium. In the years after, the club purchased the remaining lands and construction of the stadium began. In 1923 the club built three stands, which could hold 10,00 spectators. In 1939 the club built a new stadium on the same location, allowing the capacity to grow to roughly 27,000. During the Second World War the stadium was heavily damaged. In 1948 the renovation and reconstruction of it was finished and in the early 1950s Rot-Weiss Essen planned on building a new multifunctional main stand.

The ideas behind this new main stand would be a revolution on the European mainland. Georg Melches had a vision a multifunctional stand, in which a sporthall, a sauna, offices, residential units, commercial units and a press room were present. The construction would be made out of concrete and in 1954 the building was officially inaugurated. German and European papers were positive on these developments and even called the stadium the German Highbury, as an example to Arsenal's former stadium. In 1952 Rot-Weiss Essen won the German Cup and in 1954 it won the German national championship. In 1956 Georg Melches and Rot-Weiss Essen installed the first floodlight installation of West Germany. The stadium was an example for other stadiums. Due to medical conditions, Georg Melches stepped down and died in 1963. In 1964 Rot-Weiss Essen renamed the stadium to the Georg Melches Stadion.

After Melches’ death, Rot-Weiss Essen couldn't have the same successes as in the 1950s. It also appeared that all the club's money was invested in the stadium and the club had troubles in investing the little money left in new players. When West Germany was chosen as hosts for the 1974 FIFA World Cup, the club hoped investors and the municipality of Essen would invest into the stadium to make it a host for the World Cup. This did not happen and rivals Schalke 04 and Borussia Dortmund built a new stadium to host matches for the World Cup. With the little money left, Rot-Weiss Essen invested in renovating the stadium in 1975. Relegation from the 1. Bundesliga in 1977 and financial problems forced the club to sell the Georg Melches Stadium to Essen in 1979.

The municipality of Essen invested almost nothing in the renovation of the stadium and due to safety reasons parts of the stadium were closed down and demolished in 1994. The capacity was reduced to 15,000. In 2010 it was announced that Rot-Weiss Essen would build a new stadium 100 meters from the Georg Melches Stadion. One of the stands was cut into half, leaving the stadium with only 2.5 stands. On 19 May 2012, Rot-Weiss Essen played their last match in the stadium against Fortuna Köln. Two days later the Georg Melches Stadion was demolished and in August 2012 the Stadion Essen was opened.
