= 1979–80 Eintracht Frankfurt season =

Eintracht Frankfurt
1979-80 season
- Chairman: Achaz von Thümen
- Manager: Friedel Rausch
- Bundesliga: 9th
- DFB-Pokal: 4th Round
- UEFA Cup: Winner
- Top goalscorer: League: Cha Bum-kun (12); All: Bernd Hölzenbein (19)
- Highest home attendance: 60,000 27 October 1979 v Bayern Munich (league)
- Lowest home attendance: 10,000 (on three occasions) (league)
- Average home league attendance: 23,118
Home colours	Away colours

The 1979–80 Eintracht Frankfurt season was the 80th season in the club's football history. In 1974–75 the club played in the Bundesliga, the top tier of German football. It was the club's 17th season in the Bundesliga.

The season ended up with Eintracht winning the UEFA Cup for the first time.

== Matches ==
=== Legend ===
Win Draw Loss Postponed

=== Friendlies ===
19 July 1979	SpVgg Neu-Isenburg (West Germany)	0–10	(West Germany) Eintracht Frankfurt	Neu-Isenburg, West Germany
		(Report)	Hölzenbein 6', 36'; Berndroth 11' (o.g.); Schaub 19'; Müller 20', 26'; Grabowski 24'; Karger 65'; Lottermann 69'; Nachtweih 80'	Stadium: Sportpark Neu-Isenburg; Attendance: 2,500; Referee: Ulmer

21 July 1979	Wormatia Worms (West Germany)	2–5	(West Germany) Eintracht Frankfurt	Alsheim, West Germany
	Nathmann 1'; Mattern 71'	(Report)	Cha Bum-kun 32'; Karger 34'; Hölzenbein 48'; Borchers 56', 85'	Attendance: 2,700; Referee: Herbold

22 July 1979	AS Saint-Étienne (France)	2–1	(West Germany) Eintracht Frankfurt	Mulhouse, France
	Rep 27'; Ehrmantraut 31' (o.g.)	(Report)	Hölzenbein 17' (pen.)	Attendance: 8,000

24 July 1979	FSV Frankfurt (West Germany)	0–3	(West Germany) Eintracht Frankfurt	Frankfurt, West Germany
		(Report)	Cha Bum-kun 7'; Hölzenbein 12'; Nachtweih 86'	Stadium: Stadion am Bornheimer Hang; Attendance: 8,000; Referee: Jupe

28 July 1979	ASV Cham (West Germany)	2–3	(West Germany) Eintracht Frankfurt	West Germany
	Bauer 38' (pen.); Hutterer 89'	(Report)	Lorant 24'; Cha Bum-kun 52'; Nachtweih 90'	Attendance: 3,000

29 July 1979	SpVgg Lam (West Germany)	1–16	(West Germany) Eintracht Frankfurt	West Germany
	Kuchler 50'	(Report)	Karger 3', 52'; Nickel 10', 33', 70', 80'; Körbel 25', 79'; Neuberger 28'; Cha Bum-kun 29'; Ehrmantraut 39'; Nachtweih 55'; Borchers 66', 85'; Schaub 75'; Hölzenbein 83'	Attendance: 2,300

1 August 1979	SK VÖEST Linz (Austria)	2–1	(West Germany) Eintracht Frankfurt	Linz, Austria
	Kreuz 19'; Hagmayr 67'	(Report)	Hölzenbein 13'	Attendance: 12,000

3 August 1979	DJK Konstanz (West Germany)	0–3	(West Germany) Eintracht Frankfurt
		(Report)	Lottermann 27'; Grabowski 54'; Cha Bum-kun 72'	Attendance: 2,700; Referee: Meßmer

4 August 1979	VfB Friedrichshafen (West Germany)	3–3	(West Germany) Eintracht Frankfurt	West Germany
	Wohlfahrt 42'; Leidensberger 51'; Bauer 88'	(Report)	Lorant 3' (pen.); Karger 61'; Borchers 72'	Attendance: 3,000

6 August 1979	Eintracht Frankfurt (West Germany)	3–2	(Greece) PAOK	Offenburg, West Germany
	Körbel; Borchers 74'; Nachtweih 76'	(Report)	Guerino	Attendance: 2,000

14 August 1979	Standard Liège (Belgium)	2–1	(West Germany) Eintracht Frankfurt
	Sigurvinsson 54'; Voordecker 87'	(Report)	Lottermann 48'	Attendance: 8,000; Referee: Rion

20 August 1979	PAOK (Greece)	1–4	(West Germany) Eintracht Frankfurt	Saloniki, Greece
	Kermanidis 31'	(Report)	Schaub 14', 42', 71'; Nickel 89'	Attendance: 28,000

22 August 1979	Olympiakos (Greece)	2–2	(West Germany) Eintracht Frankfurt	Greece
	Giorgos KokolakisKokolakis 4'; Luizzi 16'	(Report)	Nachtweih 8'; Lorant	Attendance: 44,000

4 September 1979	Israel	1–3	(West Germany) Eintracht Frankfurt	Ramat Gan, Israel
	Neuman 82'	(Report)	Hölzenbein 9'; Cha Bum-kun 34'; Nickel 78'	Stadium: Ramat Gan Stadium; Attendance: 5,000

11 September 1979	SG Höchst (West Germany)	2–6	(West Germany) Eintracht Frankfurt	West Germany
	Launhardt 19'; Rudloff 73'	(Report)	Pezzey 3'; Cha Bum-kun 33'; Wagner 34' (o.g.); Nickel 60'; Nachtweih 63'; Ehrmantraut 85'	Attendance: 2,500; Referee: Dürck

7 October 1979	SSV Troisdorf (West Germany)	0–2	(West Germany) Eintracht Frankfurt	West Germany
		(Report)	Trapp 80'	Attendance: 2,200

14 October 1979	Union Böckingen (West Germany)	0–9	(West Germany) Eintracht Frankfurt	West Germany
		(Report)	Nickel; Cha Bum-kun; Lorant; Nachtweih; Borchers; Karger; Neuberger	Attendance: 1,800

17 October 1979	VfR 19 Limburg (West Germany)	0–9	(West Germany) Eintracht Frankfurt	Limburg, West Germany
		(Report)	Lorant 10'; Lottermann 50', 71'; Müller 57'; Ehrmantraut 77'; Blättel 84', 85'; Karger 88'; Nachtweih	Attendance: 2,500; Referee: Jupe

29 December 1979	Kickers Offenbach (West Germany)	2–1	(West Germany) Eintracht Frankfurt	West Germany
	Domes 21'; Knecht 83'	(Report)	Borchers 27'	Attendance: 5,300; Referee: Dreher

11 January 1980 Semi-final	AS Nancy-Lorraine (France)	2–0	(West Germany) Eintracht Frankfurt	Abidjan, Ivory Coast
20:45 CEST	Rubio 15'; Umpiérrez 79'	(Report)		Attendance: 20,000; Referee: Poll

13 January 1980 3rd place play-off	Ivory Coast	0–0 (a.e.t.) (4–3 p)	(West Germany) Eintracht Frankfurt	Abidjan, Ivory Coast
		(Report)		Attendance: 10,000
	Penalties
	(penalty scored) Goba		(penalty missed) Pahl; (penalty scored) Neuberger; (penalty scored) Nachtweih; (penalty scored) Lorant; (penalty missed) Müller

3 February 1980	1. FC Nürnberg (West Germany)	4–1	(West Germany) Eintracht Frankfurt	Nuremberg, West Germany
	Lieberwirth 58'; Szymanek 67'; Heidenreich 87', 90'	(Report)	Schaub 26'	Stadium: Städtisches Stadion; Attendance: 4,200; Referee: Schmidhuber

15 April 1980	FV Biebrich 02 (West Germany)	0–6	(West Germany) Eintracht Frankfurt	West Germany
		(Report)	Pezzey 5'; Michael Künast 40'; Borchers 52'; Nickel 58'; Künast 70'; Peukert 90'	Attendance: 1,200; Referee: Fenski

28 April 1980	FG 02 Seckbach (West Germany)	0–9	(West Germany) Eintracht Frankfurt	West Germany
		(Report)	Karger 12'; Pezzey 21'; Lottermann 35'; Nickel 37'; Hölzenbein 42', 77', 83'; Nachtweih (79.)(80.) 79', 80'

29 April 1980	Olympia Lorsch (West Germany)	2–4	(West Germany) Eintracht Frankfurt	West Germany
	Reichenbach; Volk	(Report)	Nickel; Hölzenbein 74'; Karger 83', 88'	Attendance: 1,500

4 May 1980	SKV Mörfelden (West Germany)	0–11	(West Germany) Eintracht Frankfurt	West Germany
		(Report)	Nickel; Neuberger; Lottermann; Cha Bum-kun; Hölzenbein; Gruber; Funk	Attendance: 2,000

10 May 1980	SV Neuhof (West Germany)	1–9	(West Germany) Eintracht Frankfurt	Neuhof, West Germany
16:00 CEST		(Report)	Körbel; Trapp; Nachtweih; Hölzenbein; Lottermann; Pezzey	Stadium: Glückauf-Stadion; Attendance: 3,000

11 May 1980	FC Burgsolms (West Germany)	1–12	(West Germany) Eintracht Frankfurt	Burgsolms, West Germany
	Goal	(Report)	Hölzenbein; Nachtweih; Nickel; Lottermann; Lorant; Blättel; Künast	Attendance: 3,000

25 May 1980	Waldeck XI (West Germany)	2–5	(West Germany) Eintracht Frankfurt	Vöhl, West Germany
	Goal	(Report)	Nachtweih; Nickel; Lorant; Trapp (o.g.)	Attendance: 2,500

27 May 1980	SC Freiburg (West Germany)	1–0	(West Germany) Eintracht Frankfurt	Bad Krozingen, West Germany
	Schulzke 69'	(Report)		Attendance: 3,500

1 June 1980	FC Sportfreunde Schwalbach (West Germany)	0–12	(West Germany) Eintracht Frankfurt	West Germany
		(Report)	Cha Bum-kun; Hölzenbein 22', 30', 41', 50', 77'; Körbel 27'; Nickel (pen.) 89'; Künast 42'; Peukert 83'	Attendance: 4,000; Referee: Schmitt

3 June 1980	SV 1920 Bonames (West Germany)	2–14	(West Germany) Eintracht Frankfurt	Frankfurt, West Germany
18:00 CEST	Goal	(Report)	Lottermann; Nachtweih; Cha Bum-kun; Nickel; Künast; Otto	Stadium: Sportplatz Harheimer Weg; Attendance: 2,000

5 June 1980	TuS Dehrn (West Germany)	2–8	(West Germany) Eintracht Frankfurt	West Germany
	Goal	(Report)	Otto; Lorant; Nachtweih; Nickel; Hölzenbein; Blättel	Attendance: 3,000

7 June 1980	Eintracht Frankfurt (West Germany)	1–3	(Brazil) CR Flamengo	Frankfurt, West Germany
	Nachtweih 3'	(Report)	Zico 11' (pen.); Nunes 49'; Andrade 86'	Stadium: Waldstadion; Attendance: 3,000; Referee: Walz

12 June 1980	South Korea	1–2	(West Germany) Eintracht Frankfurt	Seoul, South Korea
	Kwon Oh-son 71'	(Report)	Nachtweih 17'; Lorant 51' (pen.)	Attendance: 30,000

13 June 1980	South Korea	0–1	(West Germany) Eintracht Frankfurt	Busan, South Korea
		(Report)	Cha Bum-kun 80'	Attendance: 30,000

15 June 1980	South Korea	2–3	(West Germany) Eintracht Frankfurt	Seoul, South Korea
15:00 KST	Lee Jung-il 3'; Huh Jung-moo 84'	(Report)	Cha Bum-kun 9'; Hölzenbein 14'; Nickel 55'	Attendance: 25,000

18 June 1980	Hallelujah FC (South Korea)	0–2	(West Germany) Eintracht Frankfurt	Incheon, South Korea
		(Report)	Schaub 17', 46'	Attendance: 25,000

=== Bundesliga ===
==== League fixtures and results ====
11 August 1979 1	Eintracht Frankfurt	0–1	Borussia Dortmund	Frankfurt, West Germany
15:30 CEST		(Report)	Vöge 21'	Stadium: Waldstadion; Attendance: 25,000; Referee: Roth

18 August 1979 2	Fortuna Düsseldorf	1–3	Eintracht Frankfurt	Düsseldorf, West Germany
15:30 CEST	T Allofs 35'	(Report)	Neuberger 23'; Nachtweih 31', 85'	Stadium: Rheinstadion; Attendance: 19,000; Referee: Redelfs

28 August 1979 3	Eintracht Frankfurt	2–0	VfB Stuttgart	Frankfurt, West Germany
20:00 CEST	Hölzenbein 49'; Cha Bum-kun 52'	(Report)		Stadium: Waldstadion; Attendance: 40,000; Referee: Horstmann

1 September 1979 4	Eintracht Braunschweig	2–3	Eintracht Frankfurt	Braunschweig, West Germany
15:30 CEST	Worm 25'; Popivoda 78'	(Report)	Cha Bum-kun 32'; Hölzenbein 47', 73'	Stadium: Eintracht-Stadion; Attendance: 14,000; Referee: Eschweiler

8 September 1979 5	Eintracht Frankfurt	3–0	Bayer Leverkusen	Frankfurt, West Germany
15:30 CEST	Pezzey 22'; Körbel 42'; Cha Bum-kun 80'	(Report)		Stadium: Waldstadion; Attendance: 18,000; Referee: Walz

15 September 1979 6	Schalke 04	1–0	Eintracht Frankfurt	Gelsenkirchen, West Germany
15:30 CEST	Fischer 5'	(Report)		Stadium: Parkstadion; Attendance: 33,000; Referee: Meuser

22 September 1979 7	Eintracht Frankfurt	3–2	Hamburger SV	Frankfurt, West Germany
15:30 CEST	Pezzey 35'; Karger 69', 77'	(Report)	Buljan 31', 72'	Stadium: Waldstadion; Attendance: 54,000; Referee: Luca

6 October 1979 8	Borussia Mönchengladbach	4–1	Eintracht Frankfurt	Mönchengladbach, West Germany
20:00 CEST	Nielsen 11'; Lienen 27'; Nickel 37' (pen.); Wohlers 88'	(Report)	Müller 2'	Stadium: Bökelbergstadion; Attendance: 19,000; Referee: Hontheim

27 October 1979 9	Eintracht Frankfurt	3–2	Bayern Munich	Frankfurt, West Germany
15:30 CEST	Körbel 67'; Nickel 70'; Karger 78'	(Report)	Horsmann 18'; Rummenigge 61'	Stadium: Waldstadion; Attendance: 60,000; Referee: Joos

27 October 1979 10	Hertha BSC	1–0	Eintracht Frankfurt	Berlin, West Germany
15:30 CEST	Remark 82'	(Report)		Stadium: Olympiastadion; Attendance: 38,000; Referee: Assenmacher

3 November 1979 11	Eintracht Frankfurt	6–0	MSV Duisburg	Frankfurt, West Germany
15:30 CEST	Cha Bum-kun 23'; Nickel 24'; Körbel 36'; Karger 51'; Hölzenbein 83', 86'	(Report)		Stadium: Waldstadion; Attendance: 13,000; Referee: Brückner

10 November 1979 12	1. FC Kaiserslautern	0–1	Eintracht Frankfurt	Kaiserslautern, West Germany
15:30 CEST		(Report)	Hölzenbein 65'	Stadium: Betzenbergstadion; Attendance: 25,000; Referee: Gabor

17 November 1979 13	VfL Bochum	1–0	Eintracht Frankfurt	Bochum, West Germany
15:30 CEST	Abel 80' (pen.)	(Report)		Stadium: Ruhrstadion; Attendance: 20,000; Referee: Treib

24 November 1979 14	Eintracht Frankfurt	3–0	1. FC Köln	Frankfurt, West Germany
15:30 CEST	Cha Bum-kun 26', 79'; Karger 44'	(Report)		Stadium: Waldstadion; Attendance: 25,000; Referee: Niemann

1 December 1979 15	Werder Bremen	4–3	Eintracht Frankfurt	Bremen, West Germany
15:30 CEST	Dreßel 4', 38'; Bracht 54'; Reinders 57'	(Report)	Karger 22'; Lottermann 44'; Nachtweih 65'	Stadium: Weserstadion; Attendance: 15,000; Referee: Uhlig

8 December 1979 16	Eintracht Frankfurt	2–0	Bayer Uerdingen	Frankfurt, West Germany
15:30 CEST	Borchers 51'; Lottermann 85'	(Report)		Stadium: Waldstadion; Attendance: 12,000; Referee: Horeis

15 December 1979 17	TSV 1860 München	2–1	Eintracht Frankfurt	Munich, West Germany
15:30 CEST	Bitz 21', 75'	(Report)	Hölzenbein 81'	Stadium: Olympiastadion; Attendance: 15,000; Referee: Waltert

19 January 1980 18	Borussia Dortmund	0–1	Eintracht Frankfurt	Dortmund, West Germany
15:30 CEST		(Report)	Hölzenbein 50'	Stadium: Westfalenstadion; Attendance: 28,500; Referee: Linn

26 January 1980 19	Eintracht Frankfurt	1–2	Fortuna Düsseldorf	Frankfurt, West Germany
15:30 CEST	Karger 38'	(Report)	T Allofs 2'; Zewe 82'	Stadium: Waldstadion; Attendance: 17,000; Referee: Gabor

2 February 1980 20	VfB Stuttgart	4–2	Eintracht Frankfurt	Stuttgart, West Germany
15:30 CEST	Müller 49'; Klotz 55'; Kelsch 57', 58'	(Report)	Borchers 39'; Cha Bum-kun 80'	Stadium: Neckarstadion; Attendance: 25,000; Referee: Eschweiler

9 February 1980 21	Eintracht Frankfurt	7–2	Eintracht Braunschweig	Frankfurt, West Germany
15:30 CEST	Pezzey 25'; Cha Bum-kun 38'; Nachtweih 45'; Nickel 51'; Hölzenbein 62', 63'; Borchers 82'	(Report)	Trimhold 30'; Eggeling 73'	Stadium: Waldstadion; Attendance: 10,000; Referee: Hennig

22 February 1980 22	Bayer Leverkusen	2–1	Eintracht Frankfurt	Leverkusen, West Germany
20:00 CEST	Szech 15', 84'	(Report)	Hölzenbein 48'	Stadium: Ulrich-Haberland-Stadion; Attendance: 12,000; Referee: Horstmann

1 March 1980 23	Eintracht Frankfurt	3–2	Schalke 04	Frankfurt, West Germany
15:30 CEST	Karger 59'; Cha Bum-kun 80'; Nachtweih 82'	(Report)	Drexler 37'; Fischer 52'	Stadium: Waldstadion; Attendance: 21,000; Referee: Roth

8 March 1980 24	Hamburger SV	5–0	Eintracht Frankfurt	Hamburg, West Germany
15:30 CEST	Hrubesch 7', 86'; Kaltz 25'; Milewski 29'; Reimann 30'	(Report)		Stadium: Volksparkstadion; Attendance: 33,000; Referee: Engel

15 March 1980 25	Eintracht Frankfurt	5–2	Borussia Mönchengladbach	Frankfurt, West Germany
20:00 CEST	Borchers 1'; Nachtweih 7'; Körbel 44'; Cha Bum-kun 83'; Karger 86'	(Report)	Hannes 41'; Bödeker 43'	Stadium: Waldstadion; Attendance: 25,000; Referee: Heitmann

22 March 1980 26	Bayern Munich	2–0	Eintracht Frankfurt	Munich, West Germany
15:30 CEST	Lorant 32' (o.g.); Horsmann 45'	(Report)		Stadium: Olympiastadion; Attendance: 36,000; Referee: Hennig

29 March 1980 27	Eintracht Frankfurt	0–4	Hertha BSC	Frankfurt, West Germany
15:30 CEST		(Report)	Agerbeck 25', 55'; Toppel 39'; Diefenbach 55' (pen.)	Stadium: Waldstadion; Attendance: 10,000; Referee: Uhlig

20 April 1980 28	MSV Duisburg	1–0	Eintracht Frankfurt	Duisburg, West Germany
15:30 CEST	Steiner 44'	(Report)		Stadium: Wedaustadion; Attendance: 15,000; Referee: Horeis

19 April 1980 29	Eintracht Frankfurt	3–5	1. FC Kaiserslautern	Frankfurt, West Germany
	Nickel 6'; Cha Bum-kun 18'; Lorant 58' (pen.)	(Report)	Wendt 19', 90'; Briegel 65', 68'; Neues 88' (pen.)	Stadium: Waldstadion; Attendance: 22,000; Referee: Brückner

26 April 1980 30	Eintracht Frankfurt	0–1	VfL Bochum	Frankfurt, West Germany
15:30 CEST		(Report)	Kaczor 55'	Stadium: Waldstadion; Attendance: 10,000; Referee: Hontheim

3 May 1980 31	1. FC Köln	2–2	Eintracht Frankfurt	Cologne, West Germany
15:30 CEST	Neumann 4'; Schuster 21'	(Report)	Cha Bum-kun 43'; Nickel 87' (pen.)	Stadium: Müngersdorfer Stadion; Attendance: 13,000; Referee: Meuser

17 May 1980 32	Eintracht Frankfurt	3–2	Werder Bremen	Frankfurt, West Germany
15:30 CEST	Nachtweih 56'; Künast 77'; Peukert 90'	(Report)	Röber 41' (pen.); Dreßel 53'	Stadium: Waldstadion; Attendance: 16,000; Referee: Eschweiler

24 May 1980 33	Bayer Uerdingen	3–2	Eintracht Frankfurt	Krefeld, West Germany
15:30 CEST	Funkel 8', 48'; Mattsson 45'	(Report)	Lottermann 69'; Nickel 85'	Stadium: Grotenburg-Stadion; Attendance: 12,000; Referee: Quindeau

31 May 1980 34	Eintracht Frankfurt	1–1	TSV 1860 München	Frankfurt, West Germany
15:30 CEST	Zander 7' (o.g.)	(Report)	Senzen 56'	Stadium: Waldstadion; Attendance: 15,000; Referee: Burgers

==== League table ====
Pos	Team	Pld	W	D	L	GF	GA	GD	Pts	Qualification or relegation
7	Borussia Mönchengladbach	34	12	12	10	61	60	+1	36	
8	Schalke 04	34	12	9	13	40	51	−11	33	
9	Eintracht Frankfurt	34	15	2	17	65	61	+4	32	Qualification to UEFA Cup first round (Note: Eintracht Frankfurt won the 1979–80 UEFA Cup and thereby automatically qualified as defending champions.)
10	VfL Bochum	34	13	6	15	41	44	−3	32	
11	Fortuna Düsseldorf	34	13	6	15	62	72	−10	32	Qualification to Cup Winners' Cup first round

Source: www.dfb.de
Rules for classification: 1) points; 2) goal difference; 3) number of goals scored.

=== DFB-Pokal ===
25 August 1979 1st Round	Eintracht Frankfurt	6–1	BSK Olympia Neugablonz	Frankfurt, West Germany
15:30 CEST	Hölzenbein 6', 43', 88'; Lottermann 12'; Grabowski 13'; Nickel 75'	(Report)	Bayer 83'	Stadium: Waldstadion; Attendance: 3,000; Referee: Nickel

29 September 1979 2nd Round	Freiburger FC	1–4	Eintracht Frankfurt
15:30 CEST	Seubert 80'	(Report)	Lorant 9'; Karger 59'; Hölzenbein 70'; Nickel 71'	Attendance: 12,000; Referee: Joos

5 January 1980 3rd Round	Eintracht Frankfurt	2–0	SV Waldhof Mannheim	Frankfurt, West Germany
15:30 CEST	Pezzey 4'; Borchers 65'	(Report)		Stadium: Waldstadion; Attendance: 3,500; Referee: Nickel

16 February 1980 4th Round	VfB Stuttgart	3–2	Eintracht Frankfurt	Stuttgart, West Germany
	Volkert 60'; Ohlicher 67', 69'	(Report)	Hölzenbein 28'; Borchers 41'	Attendance: 25,000; Referee: Redelfs

=== UEFA Cup ===
19 September 1979 1st Round	Aberdeen (Scotland)	1–1	(West Germany) Eintracht Frankfurt	Aberdeen, Scotland
20:30 CEST	Harper 53'	(Report)	Cha Bum-kun 13'	Stadium: Pittodrie; Attendance: 23,000; Referee: Agnolin

3 October 1979 1st Round	Eintracht Frankfurt (West Germany)	1–0	(Scotland) Aberdeen	Frankfurt, West Germany
	Hölzenbein 50'	(Report)		Stadium: Waldstadion; Attendance: 17,000; Referee: Castillo

24 October 1979 2nd Round	Dinamo București (Romania)	2–0	(West Germany) Eintracht Frankfurt	Bucharest, Romania
	Mulțescu 20' (pen.); Augustin 88'	(Report)		Stadium: Stadionul Dinamo; Attendance: 12,000; Referee: Foote

7 November 1979 2nd Round	Eintracht Frankfurt (West Germany)	3–0 (a.e.t.)	(Romania) Dinamo București	Frankfurt, West Germany
	Cha Bum-kun 73'; Hölzenbein 90'; Nickel 93'	(Report)		Stadium: Waldstadion; Attendance: 20,000; Referee: Fredriksson

28 November 1979 3rd Round	Eintracht Frankfurt (West Germany)	4–1	(Netherlands) Feyenoord Rotterdam	Frankfurt, West Germany
	Cha Bum-kun 20'; Nickel 30'; Müller 55'; Lottermann 58'	(Report)	Stafleu 86'	Stadium: Waldstadion; Attendance: 40,000; Referee: Hunting

12 December 1979 3rd Round	Feyenoord Rotterdam (Netherlands)	1–0	(West Germany) Eintracht Frankfurt	Rotterdam, Netherlands
20:00 CEST	Peters 90'	(Report)		Stadium: De Kuip; Attendance: 64,000; Referee: Vautrot

5 March 1980 Quarter-finals	Eintracht Frankfurt (West Germany)	4–1	(Czechoslovak Socialist Republic) Zbrojovka Brno	Frankfurt, West Germany
	Nachtweih 13'; Lorant 44' (pen.); Nickel 51'; Karger 72'	(Report)	Horný 31'	Stadium: Waldstadion; Attendance: 30,000; Referee: Farrell

19 March 1980 Quarter-finals	Zbrojovka Brno (Czechoslovak Socialist Republic)	3–2	(West Germany) Eintracht Frankfurt	Brno, Czechoslovakia
16:30 CEST	Horný 10'; Kotásek 89'; Kopenec 90'	(Report)	Karger 18'; Neuberger 77'	Stadium: Stadion Za Lužánkami; Attendance: 45,000; Referee: Amundsen

9 April 1980 Semi-finals	Bayern Munich (West Germany)	2–0	(West Germany) Eintracht Frankfurt	Munich, West Germany
	Hoeneß 50'; Breitner 76' (pen.)	(Report)		Stadium: Olympiastadion; Attendance: 14,000; Referee: Padar

22 April 1980 Semi-finals	Eintracht Frankfurt (West Germany)	5–1 (a.e.t.)	(West Germany) Bayern Munich	Frankfurt, West Germany
	Pezzey 31', 87'; Karger 103', 107'; Lorant 118' (pen.)	(Report)	Dremmler 105'	Stadium: Waldstadion; Attendance: 50,000; Referee: McGinlay

==== Final ====
===== First leg =====
7 May 1980

Borussia Mönchengladbach (West Germany)	3–2	(West Germany) Eintracht Frankfurt
Kulik 44', 88'; Matthäus 76'	Report Overview	Karger 37'; Hölzenbein 71'

Bökelbergstadion, Mönchengladbach
Attendance: 25,000
Referee: Emilio Guruceta Muro (Spain)

Borussia Mönchengladbach	Eintracht Frankfurt

GK	1	(West Germany) Wolfgang Kneib
RB	2	(West Germany) Frank Schäffer
CB	3	(West Germany) Winfried Schäfer
CB	4	(West Germany) Wilfried Hannes
LB	5	(West Germany) Norbert Ringels
CM	6	(West Germany) Lothar Matthäus
CM	8	(West Germany) Christian Kulik (c)
CM	10	(Denmark) Carsten Nielsen		(substituted off) 66'
RF	7	(West Germany) Karl Del'Haye		(substituted off) 72'
CF	9	(West Germany) Harald Nickel	Booked
LF	11	(West Germany) Ewald Lienen
Substitutes:
FW	12	(Denmark) Steen Thychosen		(substituted on) 66'
MF	13	(West Germany) Ralf Bödeker		(substituted on) 72'
Manager:
(West Germany) Jupp Heynckes

GK	1	(East Germany) Jürgen Pahl
RB	3	(West Germany) Willi Neuberger
CB	5	(Austria) Bruno Pezzey
CB	4	(West Germany) Charly Körbel
LB	2	(West Germany) Horst Ehrmantraut
CM	6	(West Germany) Werner Lorant	Booked
CM	9	(West Germany) Ronny Borchers	Booked
CM	10	(West Germany) Bernd Nickel
RF	11	(South Korea) Cha Bum-kun
CF	8	(West Germany) Harald Karger		(substituted off) 81'
LF	7	(West Germany) Bernd Hölzenbein (c)		(substituted off) 79'
Substitutes:
MF	12	(East Germany) Norbert Nachtweih		(substituted on) 79'
MF	13	(West Germany) Wolfgang Trapp		(substituted on) 81'
Manager:
(West Germany) Friedel Rausch

===== Second leg =====
21 May 1980

Eintracht Frankfurt (West Germany)	1–0	(West Germany) Borussia Mönchengladbach
Schaub 81'	Report Overview

Waldstadion, Frankfurt
Attendance: 59,000
Referee: Alexis Ponnet (Belgium)

Eintracht Frankfurt	Borussia Mönchengladbach

GK	1	(East Germany) Jürgen Pahl
RB	3	(West Germany) Willi Neuberger
CB	5	(Austria) Bruno Pezzey
CB	4	(West Germany) Charly Körbel
LB	2	(West Germany) Horst Ehrmantraut
CM	6	(West Germany) Werner Lorant
CM	10	(West Germany) Bernd Nickel
CM	9	(West Germany) Ronny Borchers	Booked
RF	11	(South Korea) Cha Bum-kun	Booked
CF	8	(East Germany) Norbert Nachtweih		(substituted off) 77'
LF	7	(West Germany) Bernd Hölzenbein (c)	Booked
Substitutes:
CF	15	(West Germany) Fred Schaub		(substituted on) 77'
Manager:
(West Germany) Friedel Rausch

GK	1	(West Germany) Wolfgang Kneib
RB	2	(West Germany) Jürgen Fleer	Booked
CB	4	(West Germany) Wilfried Hannes	Booked
CB	3	(West Germany) Winfried Schäfer
LB	5	(West Germany) Norbert Ringels
CM	6	(West Germany) Lothar Matthäus		(substituted off) 86'
CM	8	(West Germany) Christian Kulik (c)
CM	10	(Denmark) Carsten Nielsen		(substituted off) 68'
RF	7	(West Germany) Ralf Bödeker	Booked
CF	9	(West Germany) Harald Nickel
LF	11	(West Germany) Ewald Lienen
Substitutes:
FW	12	(West Germany) Karl Del'Haye		(substituted on) 68'
FW	13	(Denmark) Steen Thychosen		(substituted on) 86'
Manager:
(West Germany) Jupp Heynckes

3–3 on aggregate. Eintracht Frankfurt won on away goals.

== Squad ==
=== Squad and statistics ===
No.	Pos	Nat	Player	Total		Bundesliga		DFB-Pokal		UEFA Cup	
No.	Pos	Nat	Player	Apps	Goals	Apps	Goals	Apps	Goals	Apps	Goals
	GK	(West Germany) FRG	Klaus Funk	36	0	25	0	3	0	8	0
	GK	(West Germany) FRG	Jürgen Pahl	14	0	9	0	1	0	4	0
	DF	(West Germany) FRG	Horst Ehrmantraut	18	0	13	0	1	0	4	0
	DF	(West Germany) FRG	Rigobert Gruber	14	0	12	0	1	0	1	0
	DF	(West Germany) FRG	Charly Körbel	48	4	32	4	4	0	12	0
	DF	(West Germany) FRG	Helmut Müller	37	2	25	1	2	0	10	1
	DF	(West Germany) FRG	Willi Neuberger	47	2	32	1	3	0	12	1
	DF	(Austria) AUT	Bruno Pezzey	28	6	14	3	2	1	12	2
	DF	(West Germany) FRG	Wolfgang Trapp	11	0	8	0	0	0	3	0
	DF	(West Germany) FRG	Claus-Peter Zick	1	0	1	0	0	0	0	0
	MF	(West Germany) FRG	Michael Blättel	1	0	1	0	0	0	0	0
	MF	(West Germany) FRG	Jürgen Grabowski	36	1	25	0	4	1	7	0
	MF	(West Germany) FRG	Werner Lorant	40	4	26	1	3	1	11	2
	MF	(West Germany) FRG	Stefan Lottermann	32	5	25	3	3	1	4	1
	MF	(West Germany) FRG	Norbert Nachtweih	47	8	32	7	4	0	11	1
	MF	(West Germany) FRG	Bernd Nickel	36	11	26	6	3	2	7	3
	FW	(West Germany) FRG	Ronny Borchers	41	6	28	4	4	2	9	0
	FW	(South Korea) KOR	Cha Bum-kun	46	15	31	12	4	0	11	3
	FW	(West Germany) FRG	Bernd Hölzenbein	42	19	29	11	4	5	9	3
	FW	(West Germany) FRG	Harald Karger	37	15	23	9	4	1	10	5
	FW	(West Germany) FRG	Michael Künast	2	1	2	1	0	0	0	0
	FW	(West Germany) FRG	Christian Peukert	1	1	1	1	0	0	0	0
	FW	(West Germany) FRG	Fred Schaub	8	1	6	0	1	0	1	1

== Sources ==
- Matheja, Ulrich (2011). Unsere Eintracht - Eintracht Frankfurt - Die Chronik. Die Werkstatt. ISBN 978-3-89533-750-5.
