= 1980 UEFA Cup final =

- Event: 1979–80 UEFA Cup
Borussia Mönchengladbach	Eintracht Frankfurt
(West Germany)	(West Germany)
3	3
- on aggregate Eintracht Frankfurt won on away goals

First leg
Borussia Mönchengladbach	Eintracht Frankfurt
3	2
- Date: 7 May 1980
- Venue: Bökelbergstadion, Mönchengladbach
- Referee: Emilio Guruceta Muro (Spain)
- Attendance: 25,000

Second leg
Eintracht Frankfurt	Borussia Mönchengladbach
1	0
- Date: 21 May 1980
- Venue: Waldstadion, Frankfurt
- Referee: Alexis Ponnet (Belgium)
- Attendance: 59,000

The 1980 UEFA Cup Final was a two-legged final, played on 7 May 1980 and 21 May 1980 to determine the champion of the 1979–80 UEFA Cup. The final pitted Eintracht Frankfurt of West Germany against Borussia Mönchengladbach, another West German side. Mönchengladbach were the holders, having won the competition's final the year prior.

Eintracht Frankfurt won on away goals after the tie ended 3–3 on aggregate.

== Route to the final ==
This season of the UEFA Cup was unique in that all four teams that played in the semi-finals of the competition were clubs from the Bundesliga in West Germany – VfB Stuttgart, Bayern Munich, Eintracht Frankfurt, and Borussia Mönchengladbach.

Borussia Mönchengladbach				Round	Eintracht Frankfurt			
Opponent	Agg.	1st leg	2nd leg		Opponent	Agg.	1st leg	2nd leg
(Norway) Viking FK	4–1	3–0 (H)	1–1 (A)	First round	(Scotland) Aberdeen	2–1	1–1 (A)	1–0 (H)
(Italy) Internazionale	4–3 (a.e.t.)	1–1 (H)	3–2 (a.e.t.) (A)	Second round	(Romania) Dinamo București	3–2 (a.e.t.)	0–2 (A)	3–0 (a.e.t.) (H)
(Romania) Universitatea Craiova	2–1	2–0 (H)	0–1 (A)	Third round	(Netherlands) Feyenoord	4–2	4–1 (H)	0–1 (A)
(France) Saint-Étienne	6–1	4–1 (A)	2–0 (H)	Quarter-finals	(Czechoslovakia) Zbrojovka Brno	6–4	4–1 (H)	2–3 (A)
(West Germany) VfB Stuttgart	3–2	1–2 (A)	2–0 (H)	Semi-finals	(West Germany) Bayern München	5–3 (a.e.t.)	0–2 (A)	5–1 (a.e.t.) (H)

== Match details ==
=== First leg ===
7 May 1980

Borussia Mönchengladbach (West Germany)	3–2	(West Germany) Eintracht Frankfurt
Kulik 44', 88'; Matthäus 76'	Report Overview	Karger 37'; Hölzenbein 71'

Bökelbergstadion, Mönchengladbach
Attendance: 25,000
Referee: Emilio Guruceta Muro (Spain)

Borussia Mönchengladbach	Eintracht Frankfurt

GK	1	(West Germany) Wolfgang Kneib
RB	2	(West Germany) Frank Schäffer
CB	3	(West Germany) Winfried Schäfer
CB	4	(West Germany) Wilfried Hannes
LB	5	(West Germany) Norbert Ringels
CM	6	(West Germany) Lothar Matthäus
CM	8	(West Germany) Christian Kulik (c)
CM	10	(Denmark) Carsten Nielsen		(substituted off) 66'
RF	7	(West Germany) Karl Del'Haye		(substituted off) 72'
CF	9	(West Germany) Harald Nickel	Booked
LF	11	(West Germany) Ewald Lienen
Substitutes:
FW	12	(Denmark) Steen Thychosen		(substituted on) 66'
MF	13	(West Germany) Ralf Bödeker		(substituted on) 72'
Manager:
(West Germany) Jupp Heynckes

GK	1	(East Germany) Jürgen Pahl
RB	3	(West Germany) Willi Neuberger
CB	5	(Austria) Bruno Pezzey
CB	4	(West Germany) Charly Körbel
LB	2	(West Germany) Horst Ehrmantraut
CM	6	(West Germany) Werner Lorant	Booked
CM	9	(West Germany) Ronny Borchers	Booked
CM	10	(West Germany) Bernd Nickel
RF	11	(South Korea) Cha Bum-kun
CF	8	(West Germany) Harald Karger		(substituted off) 81'
LF	7	(West Germany) Bernd Hölzenbein (c)		(substituted off) 79'
Substitutes:
MF	12	(East Germany) Norbert Nachtweih		(substituted on) 79'
MF	13	(West Germany) Wolfgang Trapp		(substituted on) 81'
Manager:
(West Germany) Friedel Rausch

=== Second leg ===
21 May 1980

Eintracht Frankfurt (West Germany)	1–0	(West Germany) Borussia Mönchengladbach
Schaub 81'	Report Overview

Waldstadion, Frankfurt
Attendance: 59,000
Referee: Alexis Ponnet (Belgium)

Eintracht Frankfurt	Borussia Mönchengladbach

GK	1	(East Germany) Jürgen Pahl
RB	3	(West Germany) Willi Neuberger
CB	5	(Austria) Bruno Pezzey
CB	4	(West Germany) Charly Körbel
LB	2	(West Germany) Horst Ehrmantraut
CM	6	(West Germany) Werner Lorant
CM	10	(West Germany) Bernd Nickel
CM	9	(West Germany) Ronny Borchers	Booked
RF	11	(South Korea) Cha Bum-kun	Booked
CF	8	(East Germany) Norbert Nachtweih		(substituted off) 77'
LF	7	(West Germany) Bernd Hölzenbein (c)	Booked
Substitutes:
CF	15	(West Germany) Fred Schaub		(substituted on) 77'
Manager:
(West Germany) Friedel Rausch

GK	1	(West Germany) Wolfgang Kneib
RB	2	(West Germany) Jürgen Fleer	Booked
CB	4	(West Germany) Wilfried Hannes	Booked
CB	3	(West Germany) Winfried Schäfer
LB	5	(West Germany) Norbert Ringels
CM	6	(West Germany) Lothar Matthäus		(substituted off) 86'
CM	8	(West Germany) Christian Kulik (c)
CM	10	(Denmark) Carsten Nielsen		(substituted off) 68'
RF	7	(West Germany) Ralf Bödeker	Booked
CF	9	(West Germany) Harald Nickel
LF	11	(West Germany) Ewald Lienen
Substitutes:
FW	12	(West Germany) Karl Del'Haye		(substituted on) 68'
FW	13	(Denmark) Steen Thychosen		(substituted on) 86'
Manager:
(West Germany) Jupp Heynckes

== See also ==
- 1980 European Cup final
- 1980 European Cup Winners' Cup final
- Eintracht Frankfurt in European football
- German football clubs in European competitions
- 1979–80 Eintracht Frankfurt season
