= 1981 DFB-Pokal final =

- Match programme cover
- Event: 1980–81 DFB-Pokal
Eintracht Frankfurt	1. FC Kaiserslautern
3	1
- Date: 2 May 1981
- Venue: Neckarstadion, Stuttgart
- Referee: Horst Joos (Stuttgart)
- Attendance: 71,000

The 1981 DFB-Pokal final decided the winner of the 1980–81 DFB-Pokal, the 38th season of Germany's knockout football cup competition. It was played on 2 May 1981 at the Neckarstadion in Stuttgart. Eintracht Frankfurt won the match 3–1 against 1. FC Kaiserslautern, to claim their 3rd cup title.

== Route to the final ==
The DFB-Pokal began with 128 teams in a single-elimination knockout cup competition. There were a total of six rounds leading up to the final. Teams were drawn against each other, and the winner after 90 minutes would advance. If still tied, 30 minutes of extra time was played. If the score was still level, a replay would take place at the original away team's stadium. If still level after 90 minutes, 30 minutes of extra time was played. If the score was still level, a penalty shoot-out was used to determine the winner.

Note: In all results below, the score of the finalist is given first (H: home; A: away).

Eintracht Frankfurt		Round	1. FC Kaiserslautern
Opponent	Result	1980–81 DFB-Pokal	Opponent	Result
VfB Gaggenau (A)	3–0	Round 1	VfR Heilbronn (A)	3–0
VfB Friedrichshafen (H)	6–0	Round 2	SG Egelsbach (A)	3–1
SSV Ulm (H)	3–0	Round 3	Bayern Munich (H)	2–1
VfB Oldenburg (A)	5–4	Round of 16	Alemannia Aachen (H)	3–0
VfB Stuttgart (H)	2–1	Quarter-finals	Borussia Mönchengladbach (H)	3–1
Hertha BSC (H)	1–0	Semi-finals	Eintracht Braunschweig (H)	3–2

== Match ==
=== Details ===
2 May 1981
16:00 CEST

Eintracht Frankfurt	3–1	1. FC Kaiserslautern
Neuberger 38'; Borchers 40'; Cha 64'	Report	Geye 90'

Neckarstadion, Stuttgart
Attendance: 71,000
Referee: Horst Joos (Stuttgart)

Eintracht Frankfurt	1. FC Kaiserslautern

GK	1	(East Germany) Jürgen Pahl
RB	2	(West Germany) Michael Sziedat
CB	5	(Austria) Bruno Pezzey
CB	4	(West Germany) Charly Körbel
LB	3	(West Germany) Willi Neuberger
RM	6	(West Germany) Werner Lorant
CM	10	(West Germany) Bernd Nickel
CM	8	(West Germany) Ronny Borchers
LM	9	(East Germany) Norbert Nachtweih
CF	11	(South Korea) Cha Bum-kun
CF	7	(West Germany) Bernd Hölzenbein (c)
Substitutes:
GK	1	(West Germany) Joachim Jüriens
DF	13	(West Germany) Rigobert Gruber
DF	14	(West Germany) Wolfgang Trapp
MF	12	(West Germany) Stefan Lottermann
FW	15	(West Germany) Harald Karger
Manager:
(West Germany) Lothar Buchmann

GK	1	(Sweden) Ronnie Hellström
RB	2	(West Germany) Wolfgang Wolf	Booked
CB	6	(West Germany) Hans-Günter Neues (c)
CB	3	(West Germany) Michael Dusek
LB	5	(West Germany) Hans-Peter Briegel
CM	4	(West Germany) Werner Melzer
CM	8	(West Germany) Friedhelm Funkel
CM	10	(West Germany) Hannes Bongartz
RW	7	(West Germany) Reiner Geye
CF	9	(Sweden) Benny Wendt
LW	11	(West Germany) Erhard Hofeditz
Substitutes:
GK	1	(West Germany) Armin Reichel
DF	13	(West Germany) Norbert Buschlinger
MF	12	(West Germany) Johannes Riedl
MF	15	(West Germany) Jörn Kaminke
FW	14	(West Germany) Axel Brummer
Manager:
(West Germany) Karl-Heinz Feldkamp

Match rules

- 90 minutes.
- 30 minutes of extra time if necessary.
- Penalty shoot-out if scores still level.
- Maximum of two substitutions.
