= 1976–77 Borussia Mönchengladbach season =

Borussia Mönchengladbach
1976–77 season
- Manager: Udo Lattek
- Stadium: Bökelbergstadion
- Bundesliga: 1st
- DFB-Pokal: First round
- European Cup: Runners-up
- Top goalscorer: League: Jupp Heynckes (15 goals); All: Jupp Heynckes (16 goals)

In the 1976–77 season, Borussia Mönchengladbach won their fifth Bundesliga title with 44 points, one point more than runners-up Schalke 04 and third-placed Eintracht Braunschweig, who defeated them in the first round of the DFB-Pokal. In the European Cup, they defeated Austria Wien, Torino, Club Brugge and FC Dynamo Kyiv, only to lose to Liverpool F.C. by 3–1 in the final, which they had lost to four years ago in the finals of the UEFA Cup. Due to his performances with the club this season, Danish forward Allan Simonsen won the Ballon D'Or.

== Squad ==
Note: Flags indicate national team as defined under FIFA eligibility rules; some limited exceptions apply. Players may hold more than one non-FIFA nationality.

No.	Pos.	Nation	Player
—	GK	GER	Wolfgang Kleff
—	GK	GER	Wolfgang Kneib
—	DF	GER	Wilfried Hannes
—	DF	GER	Norbert Ringels
—	DF	GER	Frank Schäffer
—	DF	GER	Berti Vogts
—	DF	GER	Hans-Jürgen Wittkamp
—	DF	GER	Horst Wohlers
—	MF	GER	Rainer Bonhof
—	MF	GER	Dietmar Danner
—	MF	GER	Hans Klinkhammer
—	MF	GER	Christian Kulik
—	MF	DEN	Carsten Nielsen
—	MF	GER	Uli Stielike
—	MF	GER	Herbert Wimmer

No.	Pos.	Nation	Player
—	FW	GER	Karl Del'Haye
—	FW	GER	Herbert Heidenreich
—	FW	GER	Jupp Heynckes
—	FW	GER	Horst Köppel
—	FW	DEN	Allan Simonsen

== Competitions ==
=== Bundesliga ===
==== League table ====
Pos	Team	Pld	W	D	L	GF	GA	GD	Pts	Qualification or relegation
1	Borussia Mönchengladbach (C)	34	17	10	7	58	34	+24	44	Qualification to European Cup first round
2	Schalke 04	34	17	9	8	77	52	+25	43	Qualification to UEFA Cup first round (Note: As 1. FC Köln qualified for the Cup Winners' Cup, their UEFA Cup spot was transferred to Bayern Munich.)
3	Eintracht Braunschweig	34	15	13	6	56	38	+18	43	Qualification to UEFA Cup first round
4	Eintracht Frankfurt	34	17	8	9	86	57	+29	42	Qualification to UEFA Cup first round
5	1. FC Köln	34	17	6	11	83	61	+22	40	Qualification to Cup Winners' Cup first round (Note: Hamburger SV won the 1976–77 European Cup Winners' Cup and thereby automatically qualified as defending champions.)

Source: www.dfb.de
Rules for classification: 1) points; 2) goal difference; 3) number of goals scored.
(C) Champions

==== Matches ====
14 August 1976 1	Borussia Mönchengladbach	1–1	Duisburg	Bökelbergstadion, Mönchengladbach
15:30	Heynckes 15'		Bregman 13'	Attendance: 23,500; Referee: Jan Redelfs

21 August 1976 2	Hertha BSC	0–1	Borussia Mönchengladbach	Olympiastadion, Berlin
15:30			Heynckes 43'	Attendance: 78,000; Referee: Ferdinand Biwersi

28 August 1976 3	Borussia Mönchengladbach	4–2	Bochum	Bökelbergstadion, Mönchengladbach
15:30	Bonhof 31'; Heynckes 58', 62', 85'		Kaczor 30', 60'	Attendance: 22,300; Referee: Horst Joos

4 September 1976 4	Borussia Dortmund	0–0	Borussia Mönchengladbach	Westfalenstadion, Dortmund
15:30				Attendance: 54,800; Referee: Eberhard Schmoock

11 September 1976 5	Borussia Mönchengladbach	3–1	Werder Bremen	Bökelbergstadion, Mönchengladbach
15:30	Bonhof 24' (pen.); Köppel 35'; Del'Haye 81'		Mense 54'	Attendance: 13,500; Referee: Jürgen Messmer

18 September 1976 6	1. FC Kaiserslautern	1–2	Borussia Mönchengladbach	Stadion Betzenberg, Kaiserslautern
15:30	Toppmöller 22'		Köppel 48'; Wimmer 54'	Attendance: 25,000; Referee: Dieter Dreher

24 September 1976 7	Borussia Mönchengladbach	6–0	Rot-Weiss Essen	Bökelbergstadion, Mönchengladbach
20:00	Heynckes 22', 52', 56'; Köppel 34'; Wittkamp 38'; Heidenreich 75'			Attendance: 21,200; Referee: Max Klauser

2 October 1976 8	Eintracht Frankfurt	1–3	Borussia Mönchengladbach	Waldstadion, Frankfurt
15:30	Weidle 20'		Simonsen 35', 52'; Wittkamp 40'	Attendance: 45,000; Referee: Klaus Ohmsen

9 October 1976 9	Borussia Mönchengladbach	3–1	Fortuna Düsseldorf	Bökelbergstadion, Mönchengladbach
15:30	Heynckes 11'; Stielike 61'; Vogts 65'		Zimmermann 2'	Attendance: 29,000; Referee: Paul Kindervater

23 October 1976 10	Eintracht Braunschweig	1–1	Borussia Mönchengladbach	Eintracht-Stadion, Braunschweig
15:30	Frank 73'		Simonsen 86'	Attendance: 32,000; Referee: Rudolf Frickel

29 October 1976 11	Borussia Mönchengladbach	3–0	Tennis Borussia Berlin	Bökelbergstadion, Mönchengladbach
20:00	Heynckes 45', 48'; Stielike 73'			Attendance: 20,300; Referee: Theo Antz

6 November 1976 12	Köln	0–3	Borussia Mönchengladbach	Müngersdorfer Stadion, Cologne
15:30			Heynckes 43', 83'; Bonhof 74'	Attendance: 61,188; Referee: Jürgen Messmer

13 November 1976 13	Borussia Mönchengladbach	2–0	Schalke 04	Bökelbergstadion, Mönchengladbach
15:30	Wittkamp 38'; Heynckes 78'			Attendance: 34,500; Referee: Herbert Lutz

20 November 1976 14	Hamburg	4–1	Borussia Mönchengladbach	Volksparkstadion, Hamburg
15:30	Reimann 9'; Bjørnmose 58'; Volkert 69'; Eigel 74'		Hannes 83'	Attendance: 60,000; Referee: Gert Meuser

27 November 1976 15	Borussia Mönchengladbach	3–0	Saarbrücken	Bökelbergstadion, Mönchengladbach
15:30	Stielike 26'; Hannes 47'; Simonsen 86'			Attendance: 16,100; Referee: Walter Niemann

4 December 1976 16	Karlsruhe	4–0	Borussia Mönchengladbach	Wildparkstadion, Karlsruhe
15:30	Berger 5', 30'; Struth 25'; Janzon 76'			Attendance: 46,000; Referee: Günter Linn

11 December 1976 17	Borussia Mönchengladbach	1–0	Bayern Munich	Bökelbergstadion, Mönchengladbach
15:30	Simonsen 52'			Attendance: 34,500; Referee: Volker Roth

15 January 1977 18	MSV Duisburg	3–2	Borussia Mönchengladbach	Wedaustadion, Duisburg
15:30	Worm 42'; Bruckmann 62'; Büssers 69'		Bonhof 14'; Simonsen 84'	Attendance: 22,000; Referee: Theo Antz

22 January 1977 19	Borussia Mönchengladbach	2–1	Hertha BSC	Bökelbergstadion, Mönchengladbach
15:30	Simonsen 21'; Wimmer 24'		Krämer 51'	Attendance: 22,000; Referee: Winfried Walz

29 January 1977 20	Bochum	0–0	Borussia Mönchengladbach	Ruhrstadion, Bochum
15:30				Attendance: 25,000; Referee: Wilfried Haselberger

12 February 1977 22	Werder Bremen	1–0	Borussia Mönchengladbach	Weserstadion, Bremen
15:30	Meininger 46'			Attendance: 29,000; Referee: Horst Joos

26 February 1977 23	Borussia Mönchengladbach	0–0	Kaiserslautern	Bökelbergstadion, Mönchengladbach
15:30				Attendance: 17,800; Referee: Volker Roth

5 March 1977 24	Rot-Weiss Essen	1–0	Borussia Mönchengladbach	Georg-Melches-Stadion, Essen
15:30	Hrubesch 73'			Attendance: 20,000; Referee: Herbert Schmoock

12 March 1977 25	Borussia Mönchengladbach	1–3	Eintracht Frankfurt	Bökelbergstadion, Mönchengladbach
15:30	Hannes 90'		Wenzel 25'; Stepanović 60'; Nickel 89' (pen.)	Attendance: 23,000; Referee: Günter Linn

19 March 1977 26	Fortuna Düsseldorf	0–1	Borussia Mönchengladbach	Rheinstadion, Düsseldorf
15:30			Simonsen 51'	Attendance: 40,000; Referee: Wilfried Hilker

26 March 1977 26	Borussia Mönchengladbach	1–1	Eintracht Braunschweig	Bökelbergstadion, Mönchengladbach
15:30	Bonhof 23'		Frank 84'	Attendance: 34,500; Referee: Jürgen Walther

30 March 1977 21	Borussia Mönchengladbach	1–1	Borussia Dortmund	Bökelbergstadion, Mönchengladbach
20:00	Wittkamp 61'		Huber 85' (pen.)	Attendance: 30,000; Referee: Dieter Dreher

2 April 1977 28	Tennis Borussia Berlin	0–1	Borussia Mönchengladbach	Olympiastadion, Berlin
15:30			Simonsen 63'	Attendance: 15,000; Referee: Max Klauser

12 April 1977 29	Borussia Mönchengladbach	3–1	Köln	Bökelbergstadion, Mönchengladbach
20:00	Bonhof 58'; Simonsen 70'; Kulik 77'		Flohe 75'	Attendance: 30,000; Referee: Klaus Ohmsen

16 April 1977 30	Schalke 04	1–0	Borussia Mönchengladbach	Parkstadion, Gelsenkirchen
15:30	Abramczik 6'			Attendance: 70,600; Referee: Heinz Aldinger

23 April 1977 31	Borussia Mönchengladbach	0–0	Hamburg	Bökelbergstadion, Mönchengladbach
15:30				Attendance: 31,000; Referee: Walter Engel

7 May 1977 32	Saarbrücken	2–2	Borussia Mönchengladbach	Ludwigspark, Saarbrücken
15:30	Schuster 63'; Förster 87'		Förster 3' (o.g.); Heidenreich 55'	Attendance: 37,000; Referee: Peter Gabor

14 May 1977 33	Borussia Mönchengladbach	5–1	Karlsruhe	Bökelbergstadion, Mönchengladbach
15:30	Simonsen 20', 79'; Wittkamp 47'; Wohlers 51', 68'		Kübler 84'	Attendance: 23,200; Referee: Udo Zuchantke

21 May 1977 34	Bayern Munich	2–2	Borussia Mönchengladbach	Olympiastadion, Munich
15:30	Müller 36'; Wittkamp 90' (pen.)		Heynckes 20'; Stielike 22'	Attendance: 77,500; Referee: Ferdinand Biwersi

=== DFB-Pokal ===
7 September 1976 First round	Borussia Mönchengladbach	0–2	Eintracht Braunschweig	Bökelbergstadion, Mönchengladbach
			Frank 57'; Gersdorff 84'	Attendance: 19,500; Referee: Winfried Walz

=== European Cup ===
==== First round ====
15 September 1976 First leg	Austria Wien	1–0	(Germany) Borussia Mönchengladbach	Praterstadion, Vienna
	Daxbacher 23'			Attendance: 54,000; Referee: Riccardo Lattanzi (Italy)

29 September 1976 Second leg	Borussia Mönchengladbach (Germany)	3–0	Austria Wien	Bökelbergstadion, Mönchengladbach
	Stielike 39'; Bonhof 54' (pen.); Heynckes 57'			Attendance: 28,000; Referee: Károly Palotai (Hungary)

==== Second round ====
20 October 1976 First leg	Torino (Italy)	1–2	(Germany) Borussia Mönchengladbach	Stadio Olimpico Grande Torino, Turin
	Sala 64'		Vogts 28'; Klinkhammer 79'	Attendance: 71,160; Referee: Walter Hungerbühler (Switzerland)

3 November 1976 Second leg	Borussia Mönchengladbach (Germany)	0–0	(Italy) Torino	Rheinstadion, Düsseldorf
				Attendance: 64,389; Referee: Alfred Delcourt (Belgium)

==== Quarter-final ====
2 March 1977 First leg	Borussia Mönchengladbach (Germany)	2–2	(Belgium) Club Brugge	Rheinstadion, Düsseldorf
	Kulik 43'; Simonsen 63'		Cools 23'; Courant 39'	Attendance: 65,000; Referee: Georges Konrath (France)

16 March 1977 Second leg	Club Brugge KV (Belgium)	0–1	(Germany) Borussia Mönchengladbach	Olympiastadion, Brugge
			Hannes 84'	Attendance: 32,000; Referee: Pavel Kazakov (Soviet Union)

==== Semi-final ====
6 April 1977 First leg	Dynamo Kyiv (Soviet Union)	1–0	(Germany) Borussia Mönchengladbach	Central Stadium, Kyiv
19:00	Onyshchenko 71'			Attendance: 102,000; Referee: Pablo Sánchez Ibáñez (Spain)

20 April 1977 Second leg	Borussia Mönchengladbach (Germany)	2–0	(Soviet Union) Dynamo Kyiv	Rheinstadion, Düsseldorf
20:00	Bonhof 21' (pen.); Wittkamp 82'			Attendance: 72,000; Referee: Francis Rion (Belgium)

==== Final ====
25 May 1977 Final	Borussia Mönchengladbach (Germany)	1–3	(England) Liverpool	Stadio Olimpico, Rome
	Simonsen 52'		McDermott 28'; Smith 65'; Neal 82' (pen.)	Attendance: 52,078; Referee: Robert Wurtz (France)
