= Eintracht Frankfurt in European football =

German club in European football

- Club: Eintracht Frankfurt
- Seasons played: 31
- Most appearances: Kevin Trapp (67)
- Top scorer: Bernd Hölzenbein (24)
- First entry: 1955–58 Inter-Cities Fairs Cup
- Latest entry: 2025–26 UEFA Champions League

Titles
- Champions League: 0
- Europa League: 2: 1980; 2022
- Cup Winners' Cup: 0
- Conference League: 0
- Super Cup: 0

Eintracht Frankfurt played their very first official match in competitive European football on 11 November 1959. This was a European Cup first-round game against BSC Young Boys of Switzerland. The match ended in a 4–1 away victory for the Eintracht. However, a Frankfurt XI took part already earlier in the Inter-Cities Fairs Cup with several Eintracht players in the squad. Requirements had it that the best players from the eligible teams Eintracht Frankfurt, FSV Frankfurt, Kickers Offenbach and SpVgg 03 Neu-Isenburg were picked to form a representative inter-city side.

== Summary ==
The club's first ever match against European opponents was a friendly match against Swedish side Malmö FF in 1920 when the Scanians visited Germany.

In season 1959–60, Eintracht took part in the European Cup. In this season, they became the first German club to reach a European final, eventually losing 7–3 to Real Madrid.

In the 1966–67 season, the club played in the Intertoto Cup which they finally won, facing Inter Bratislava in the final. Plus in the same season, Eintracht played in the Inter-Cities Fairs Cup and reached the semi-finals. In 1967, the Eagles won the Cup of the Alps, a tournament then composed of Italian, Swiss and German teams.

Frankfurt's first appearance in the renamed UEFA Cup was in 1972, the first step in the Cup Winners' Cup stage was made in 1974.

In the 1979–80 edition of the UEFA Cup, Eintracht reached the finals. The first leg was lost at fellow West German club Borussia Mönchengladbach, but the second leg was decided by the send on striker Fred Schaub in the 81st minute and secured the Mainhattan club the first major European title.

In the 1980s, the club struggled to participate regularly in European competitions.

Between the beginning to the mid-1990s the Eagles re-established themselves as a powerhouse in Europe and advanced far in the UEFA Cup regularly with players such as Uwe Bein, Jay-Jay Okocha, Uli Stein, Ralf Weber and Tony Yeboah on the books.

Despite reaching the 1994–95 UEFA Cup quarter-finals, Eintracht bounced between the first two tiers for almost ten years after the relegation from the Bundesliga in the 1995–96 campaign.

Since 2005, they were part of the first Bundesliga again and immediately qualified for the UEFA Cup due to the participation in the DFB Cup final against Bayern Munich who were already qualified for the Champions League. In the following UEFA Cup campaign, Eintracht reached the group stage and seemed to be likely to advance to the next round but conceded two goals at Fenerbahçe after being up 2–0 what meant that Eintracht had to defer to the Istanbul club.

In 2013, Eintracht played at Bordeaux with 12,000 fans from Frankfurt and about 8,000 Bordeaux supporters. Eintracht were eliminated in the round of 32 after drawing twice with Porto.

In 2018, the qualification for the Europa League group stage was achieved by winning the DFB Cup for the first time in thirty years. In the 2018–19 Europa League, Luka Jović with his ten goals aided Eintracht to reach the semi-finals of the competition, only losing on penalties to the eventual champions, Chelsea.

On 14 April 2022, over 20,000 fans travelled as Eintracht defeated Barcelona 3–2 at the Camp Nou and 4–3 on aggregate in the 2021–22 UEFA Europa League to qualify for the semi-finals. On 18 May 2022, Eintracht secured the Europa League title after winning 5–4 on penalties (1–1 after extra time) against Rangers in the final.

On 10 August 2022, Eintracht played in their first Super Cup final against 2021–22 UEFA Champions Winners Real Madrid in Helsinki. They lost the game 2–0.

== Overall record ==
Results (%)
1. Won – 98 (52.4%)
2. Drew – 35 (18.7%)
3. Lost – 54 (28.9%)

Accurate as of 28 January 2026

Competition	Played	Won	Drew	Lost	GF	GA	GD	Win%
European Cup / Champions League	23	8	4	11	40	49	−9	34.78
Cup Winners' Cup	24	14	3	7	41	23	+18	58.33
UEFA Cup / UEFA Europa League	125	69	27	29	236	132	+104	55.20
UEFA Europa Conference League	10	4	2	4	17	12	+5	40.00
UEFA Intertoto Cup	5	3	0	2	14	6	+8	60.00
UEFA Super Cup	1	0	0	1	0	2	−2	0.00
Total	187	98	35	54	346	222	+124	52.41

Legend: GF = Goals For. GA = Goals Against. GD = Goal Difference.

== UEFA competitions ==
Season	Competition	Round	Opponent	Home	Away	Aggregate
1959–60	European Cup	Preliminary Round	(Finland) KuPS	KuPS withdrew (Note: Initially, Kuopion Palloseura planned to move their home match to Schwenningen, West Germany, to generate more income. That plan was rejected by UEFA, so KuPS withdrew and Eintracht Frankfurt advanced in a walkover.)		
1959–60	European Cup	First Round	(Switzerland) Young Boys	1–1	4–1	5–2
1959–60	European Cup	Quarter-Final	(Austria) Wiener SC	2–1	1–1	3–2
1959–60	European Cup	Semi-Final	(Scotland) Rangers	6–1	6–3	12–4
1959–60	European Cup	Final	(Spain) Real Madrid	3–7		
1972–73	UEFA Cup	First Round	(England) Liverpool	0–0	0–2	0–2
1974–75	Cup Winners' Cup	First Round	(France) Monaco	3–0	2–2	5–2
1974–75	Cup Winners' Cup	Second Round	(Soviet Union) Dynamo Kyiv	2–3	1–2	3–5
1975–76	Cup Winners' Cup	First Round	(Northern Ireland) Coleraine	5–1	6–2	11–3
1975–76	Cup Winners' Cup	Second Round	(Spain) Atlético Madrid	1–0	2–1	3–1
1975–76	Cup Winners' Cup	Quarter-Final	(Austria) Sturm Graz	1–0	2–0	3–0
1975–76	Cup Winners' Cup	Semi-Final	(England) West Ham United	2–1	1–3	3–4
1977–78	UEFA Cup	First Round	(Malta) Sliema Wanderers	5–0	0–0	5–0
1977–78	UEFA Cup	Second Round	(Switzerland) Zürich	4–3	3–0	7–3
1977–78	UEFA Cup	Third Round	(West Germany) Bayern Munich	4–0	2–1	6–1
1977–78	UEFA Cup	Quarter-Final	(Switzerland) Grasshoppers	3–2	0–1	3–3 (a)
1979–80	UEFA Cup	First Round	(Scotland) Aberdeen	1–0	1–1	2–1
1979–80	UEFA Cup	Second Round	(Romania) Dinamo București	3–0 (a.e.t.)	0–2	3–2
1979–80	UEFA Cup	Third Round	(Netherlands) Feyenoord	4–1	0–1	4–2
1979–80	UEFA Cup	Quarter-Final	(Czechoslovakia) Zbrojovka Brno	4–1	2–3	6–4
1979–80	UEFA Cup	Semi-Final	(West Germany) Bayern Munich	5–1 (a.e.t.)	0–2	5–3
1979–80	UEFA Cup	Final	(West Germany) Borussia Mönchengladbach	1–0	2–3	3–3 (a)
1980–81	UEFA Cup	First Round	(Soviet Union) Shakhtar Donetsk	3–0	0–1	3–1
1980–81	UEFA Cup	Second Round	(Netherlands) Utrecht	3–1	1–2	4–3
1980–81	UEFA Cup	Third Round	(France) Sochaux	4–2	0–2	4–4 (a)
1981–82	Cup Winners' Cup	First Round	(Greece) PAOK	2–0	0–2	2–2, 5–4 (p)
1981–82	Cup Winners' Cup	Second Round	(Soviet Union) SKA Rostov	2–0	0–1	2–1
1981–82	Cup Winners' Cup	Quarter-Final	(England) Tottenham Hotspur	2–1	0–2	2–3
1988–89	Cup Winners' Cup	First Round	(Switzerland) Grasshoppers	1–0	0–0	1–0
1988–89	Cup Winners' Cup	Second Round	(Turkey) Sakaryaspor	3–1	3–0	6–1
1988–89	Cup Winners' Cup	Quarter-Final	(Belgium) KV Mechelen	0–0	0–1	0–1
1990–91	UEFA Cup	First Round	(Denmark) Brøndby	4–1	0–5	4–6
1991–92	UEFA Cup	First Round	Spora Luxembourg	6–1	5–0	11–1
1991–92	UEFA Cup	Second Round	(Belgium) Gent	0–1	0–0	0–1
1992–93	UEFA Cup	First Round	(Poland) Widzew Łódź	9–0	2–2	11–2
1992–93	UEFA Cup	Second Round	(Turkey) Galatasaray	0–0	0–1	0–1
1993–94	UEFA Cup	First Round	(Russia) Dynamo Moscow	1–2	6–0	7–2
1993–94	UEFA Cup	Second Round	(Ukraine) Dnipro Dnipropetrovsk	2–0	0–1	2–1
1993–94	UEFA Cup	Third Round	(Spain) Deportivo La Coruña	1–0	1–0	2–0
1993–94	UEFA Cup	Quarter-Final	Austria Salzburg	1–0	0–1	1–1, 4–5 (p)
1994–95	UEFA Cup	First Round	(Slovenia) Olimpija Ljubljana	2–0	1–1	3–1
1994–95	UEFA Cup	Second Round	(Romania) Rapid București	5–0	1–2	6–2
1994–95	UEFA Cup	Third Round	(Italy) Napoli	1–0	1–0	2–0
1994–95	UEFA Cup	Quarter-Final	(Italy) Juventus	1–1	0–3	1–4
1995	Intertoto Cup	Group 12	(Bulgaria) Spartak Plovdiv	—N/a	4–0	2nd
1995	Intertoto Cup	Group 12	(Greece) Iraklis	5–1	—N/a	2nd
1995	Intertoto Cup	Group 12	(Lithuania) FK Panerys Vilnius	—N/a	4–0	2nd
1995	Intertoto Cup	Group 12	(Austria) Vorwärts Steyr	1–2	—N/a	2nd
1995	Intertoto Cup	Second Round	(France) Bordeaux	—N/a	0–3	0–3
2006–07	UEFA Cup	First Round	(Denmark) Brøndby	4–0	2–2	6–2
2006–07	UEFA Cup	Group A	(Italy) Palermo	1–2	—N/a	5th
2006–07	UEFA Cup	Group A	(Spain) Celta Vigo	—N/a	1–1	5th
2006–07	UEFA Cup	Group A	(England) Newcastle United	0–0	—N/a	5th
2006–07	UEFA Cup	Group A	(Turkey) Fenerbahçe	—N/a	2–2	5th
2013–14	UEFA Europa League	Play-off Round	(Azerbaijan) Qarabağ	2–1	2–0	4–1
2013–14	UEFA Europa League	Group F	(France) Bordeaux	3–0	1–0	1st
2013–14	UEFA Europa League	Group F	(Cyprus) APOEL	2–0	3–0	1st
2013–14	UEFA Europa League	Group F	(Israel) Maccabi Tel Aviv	2–0	2–4	1st
2013–14	UEFA Europa League	Round of 32	(Portugal) Porto	3–3	2–2	5–5 (a)
2018–19	UEFA Europa League	Group H	(France) Marseille	4–0	2–1	1st
2018–19	UEFA Europa League	Group H	(Italy) Lazio	4–1	2–1	1st
2018–19	UEFA Europa League	Group H	(Cyprus) Apollon Limassol	2–0	3–2	1st
2018–19	UEFA Europa League	Round of 32	(Ukraine) Shakhtar Donetsk	4–1	2–2	6–3
2018–19	UEFA Europa League	Round of 16	(Italy) Internazionale	0–0	1–0	1–0
2018–19	UEFA Europa League	Quarter-Final	(Portugal) Benfica	2–0	2–4	4–4 (a)
2018–19	UEFA Europa League	Semi-Final	(England) Chelsea	1–1	1–1 (a.e.t.)	2–2, 3–4 (p)
2019–20	UEFA Europa League	Second Qualifying Round	(Estonia) Flora	2–1	2–1	4–2
2019–20	UEFA Europa League	Third Qualifying Round	(Liechtenstein) Vaduz	1–0	5–0	6–0
2019–20	UEFA Europa League	Play-off Round	(France) Strasbourg	3–0	0–1	3–1
2019–20	UEFA Europa League	Group F	(England) Arsenal	0–3	2–1	2nd
2019–20	UEFA Europa League	Group F	(Belgium) Standard Liège	2–1	1–2	2nd
2019–20	UEFA Europa League	Group F	(Portugal) Vitória de Guimarães	2–3	1–0	2nd
2019–20	UEFA Europa League	Round of 32	(Austria) Red Bull Salzburg	4–1	2–2	6–3
2019–20	UEFA Europa League	Round of 16	(Switzerland) Basel	0–3	0–1	0–4
2021–22	UEFA Europa League	Group D	(Turkey) Fenerbahçe	1–1	1–1	1st
2021–22	UEFA Europa League	Group D	(Belgium) Antwerp	1–1	1–0	1st
2021–22	UEFA Europa League	Group D	(Greece) Olympiacos	3–1	2–1	1st
2021–22	UEFA Europa League	Round of 16	(Spain) Real Betis	1–1 (a.e.t.)	2–1	3–2
2021–22	UEFA Europa League	Quarter-Final	(Spain) Barcelona	1–1	3–2	4–3
2021–22	UEFA Europa League	Semi-Final	(England) West Ham United	1–0	2–1	3–1
2021–22	UEFA Europa League	Final	(Scotland) Rangers	1–1 (a.e.t.) (5–4 p) (N)		
2022–23	UEFA Super Cup	Final	(Spain) Real Madrid	0–2 (N)		
2022–23	UEFA Champions League	Group D	(Portugal) Sporting CP	0–3	2–1	2nd
2022–23	UEFA Champions League	Group D	(France) Marseille	2–1	1–0	2nd
2022–23	UEFA Champions League	Group D	(England) Tottenham Hotspur	0–0	2–3	2nd
2022–23	UEFA Champions League	Round of 16	(Italy) Napoli	0–2	0–3	0–5
2023–24	UEFA Europa Conference League	Play-off Round	(Bulgaria) Levski Sofia	2–0	1–1	3–1
2023–24	UEFA Europa Conference League	Group G	(Scotland) Aberdeen	2–1	0–2	2nd
2023–24	UEFA Europa Conference League	Group G	(Greece) PAOK	1–2	1–2	2nd
2023–24	UEFA Europa Conference League	Group G	(Finland) HJK	6–0	1–0	2nd
2023–24	UEFA Europa Conference League	Knockout Round Play-off	(Belgium) Union Saint-Gilloise	1–2	2–2	3–4
2024–25	UEFA Europa League	League Phase	(Czech Republic) Viktoria Plzeň	3–3	—N/a	5th
2024–25	UEFA Europa League	League Phase	(Turkey) Beşiktaş	—N/a	3–1	5th
2024–25	UEFA Europa League	League Phase	(Latvia) RFS	1–0	—N/a	5th
2024–25	UEFA Europa League	League Phase	(Czech Republic) Slavia Prague	1–0	—N/a	5th
2024–25	UEFA Europa League	League Phase	(Denmark) Midtjylland	—N/a	2–1	5th
2024–25	UEFA Europa League	League Phase	(France) Lyon	—N/a	2–3	5th
2024–25	UEFA Europa League	League Phase	(Hungary) Ferencváros	2–0	—N/a	5th
2024–25	UEFA Europa League	League Phase	(Italy) Roma	—N/a	0–2	5th
2024–25	UEFA Europa League	Round of 16	(Netherlands) Ajax	4–1	2–1	6–2
2024–25	UEFA Europa League	Quarter-Final	(England) Tottenham Hotspur	0–1	1–1	1–2
2025–26	UEFA Champions League	League Phase	(Turkey) Galatasaray	5–1	—N/a	33rd
2025–26	UEFA Champions League	League Phase	(Spain) Atlético Madrid	—N/a	1–5	33rd
2025–26	UEFA Champions League	League Phase	(England) Liverpool	1–5	—N/a	33rd
2025–26	UEFA Champions League	League Phase	(Italy) Napoli	—N/a	0–0	33rd
2025–26	UEFA Champions League	League Phase	(Italy) Atalanta	0–3	—N/a	33rd
2025–26	UEFA Champions League	League Phase	(Spain) Barcelona	—N/a	1–2	33rd
2025–26	UEFA Champions League	League Phase	(Azerbaijan) Qarabağ	—N/a	2–3	33rd
2025–26	UEFA Champions League	League Phase	(England) Tottenham Hotspur	0–2	—N/a	33rd

== Non-UEFA competitions ==
Season	Competition	Round	Opposition	Home	Away	Aggregate
1955–58	Inter-Cities Fairs Cup	Group D	(England) London XI	1–0	2–3	2nd
1955–58	Inter-Cities Fairs Cup	Group D	(Switzerland) Basel XI	5–1	2–6	2nd
1964–65	Inter-Cities Fairs Cup	First Round	(Scotland) Kilmarnock	3–0	1–5	4–5
1965–66	Intertoto Cup	Group A3	(Switzerland) La Chaux-de-Fonds	4–0	2–3	3rd
1965–66	Intertoto Cup	Group A3	(Sweden) IFK Norrköping	1–2	0–1	3rd
1965–66	Intertoto Cup	Group A3	(Netherlands) PSV Eindhoven	4–2	0–3	3rd
1966–67	Intertoto Cup	Group A1	(Switzerland) La Chaux-de-Fonds	3–1	4–2	1st
1966–67	Intertoto Cup	Group A1	(Netherlands) Feyenoord	2–0	4–1	1st
1966–67	Intertoto Cup	Group A1	(Italy) Lanerossi Vicenza	1–5	1–0	1st
1966–67	Intertoto Cup	Quarter-Final	(Sweden) IFK Norrköping	3–1	1–2	4–3
1966–67	Intertoto Cup	Semi-Final	(Poland) Zagłębie Sosnowiec	6–1	1–4	7–5
1966–67	Intertoto Cup	Final	(Czechoslovakia) Inter Bratislava	1–1	3–2	4–3
1966–67	Inter-Cities Fairs Cup	First Round	(Republic of Ireland) Drumcondra	6–1	2–0	8–1
1966–67	Inter-Cities Fairs Cup	Second Round	(Denmark) Hvidovre	5–1	2–2	7–3
1966–67	Inter-Cities Fairs Cup	Third Round	(Hungary) Ferencváros	4–1	1–2	5–3
1966–67	Inter-Cities Fairs Cup	Quarter-Final	(England) Burnley	1–1	2–1	3–2
1966–67	Inter-Cities Fairs Cup	Semi-Final	(Socialist Federal Republic of Yugoslavia) Dinamo Zagreb	3–0	0–4 (a.e.t.)	3–4
1967–68	Inter-Cities Fairs Cup	First Round	(England) Nottingham Forest	0–1	0–4	0–5
1968–69	Inter-Cities Fairs Cup	First Round	(Austria) Wacker Innsbruck	3–0	2–2	5–2
1968–69	Inter-Cities Fairs Cup	Second Round	(Italy) Juventus	1–0 (a.e.t.)	0–0	1–0
1968–69	Inter-Cities Fairs Cup	Third Round	(Spain) Athletic Bilbao	1–1	0–1	1–2

== Clubs played ==
Eintracht Frankfurt have played against clubs from 37 countries (clubs classed by the country they were in when the game was played). Eintracht have played 103 different clubs in Europe.

Country	Clubs
Austria	Sturm Graz, Wacker Innsbruck, Austria Salzburg, Vorwärts Steyr, Wiener SC
Azerbaijan	Qarabağ
Belgium	Antwerp, Gent, Standard Liège, KV Mechelen, Union Saint-Gilloise
Bulgaria	Spartak Plovdiv, Levski Sofia
Cyprus	APOEL, Apollon Limassol
Czech Republic	Slavia Prague, Viktoria Plzeň
Czechoslovakia	Zbrojovka Brno (now Czech Republic), Inter Bratislava (now Slovakia)
Denmark	Brøndby, Hvidovre, Midtjylland
England	Arsenal, Burnley, Chelsea, Liverpool, London XI, Newcastle United, Nottingham Forest, Tottenham Hotspur, West Ham United
Estonia	Flora
Finland	HJK
France	Bordeaux, Lyon, Marseille, Monaco, Strasbourg
Germany (West)	Borussia Mönchengladbach, Bayern Munich
Greece	Iraklis, Olympiacos, PAOK
Hungary	Ferencváros
Ireland	Drumcondra
Israel	Maccabi Tel Aviv
Italy	Atalanta, Internazionale, Juventus, Lazio, Napoli, Palermo, Roma, Lanerossi Vicenza
Latvia	RFS
Liechtenstein	Vaduz
Lithuania	Panerys Vilnius
Luxembourg	Spora Luxembourg
Malta	Sliema Wanderers
Netherlands	Ajax, PSV Eindhoven, Feyenoord, Utrecht
Northern Ireland	Coleraine
Poland	Widzew Łódź, Zagłębie Sosnowiec
Portugal	Benfica, Porto, Sporting CP, Vitória de Guimarães
Romania	Dinamo București, Rapid București
Russia	Dynamo Moscow
Scotland	Aberdeen, Kilmarnock, Rangers
Slovenia	Olimpija Ljubljana
Soviet Union	Shakhtar Donetsk (now Ukraine), Dynamo Kyiv (now Ukraine), SKA Rostov (now Russia)
Spain	Barcelona, Real Betis, Athletic Bilbao, Deportivo La Coruña, Atlético Madrid, Real Madrid, Celta Vigo
Sweden	IFK Norrköping
Switzerland	Basel, Basel XI, Young Boys, FC Biel-Bienne, La Chaux-de-Fonds, Lausanne-Sport, Zürich, Grasshoppers
Turkey	Beşiktaş, Fenerbahçe, Galatasaray, Sakaryaspor
Ukraine	Dnipro Dnipropetrovsk, Shakhtar Donetsk
Yugoslavia	Dinamo Zagreb (now Croatia)

== Record by country of opposition ==
As of 28 January 2026

Country	Pld	W	D	L	Win %
Austria	11	6	3	2	55
Azerbaijan	3	2	0	1	66.67
Belgium	10	2	4	4	20
Bulgaria	3	2	0	0	66.67
Cyprus	4	4	0	0	100
Czech Republic	2	1	1	0	50
Czechoslovakia	4	2	1	1	50
Denmark	5	3	1	1	60
England	25	7	7	11	28
Estonia	2	2	0	0	100
Finland	2	2	0	0	100
France	14	9	1	4	64.29
Germany (West)	6	4	0	2	66.67
Greece	7	4	0	3	57.14
Hungary	3	2	0	1	66.67
(Republic of Ireland) Ireland	2	2	0	0	100
Israel	2	1	0	1	50
Italy	24	11	5	8	45.83
Latvia	1	1	0	0	100
Liechtenstein	2	2	0	0	100
Lithuania	1	1	0	0	100
Luxembourg	2	2	0	0	100
Malta	2	1	1	0	50
Netherlands	10	7	0	3	70
Northern Ireland	2	2	0	0	100
Poland	4	2	1	1	50
Portugal	8	3	2	3	37.5
Romania	4	2	0	2	50
Russia	2	1	0	1	50
Scotland	9	5	2	2	55.56
Slovenia	2	1	1	0	50
Spain	15	6	4	5	40
Sweden	3	1	0	2	33.33
Switzerland	20	13	2	5	65
Turkey	9	4	4	1	44.44
Ukraine	4	2	1	1	50
(Soviet Union) USSR	6	2	0	4	33.33
(Socialist Federal Republic of Yugoslavia) Yugoslavia	2	1	0	1	50
Totals	235	124	42	69	52.77

Pld – Played; W – Won; D – Drawn; L – Lost

== Record players ==
Key

SC = UEFA Super Cup, EC / CL = European Cup / Champions League, EL / UC = Europa League / UEFA Cup, CWC = Cup Winners' Cup, UIC = Intertoto Cup, UECL = UEFA Europa Conference League

Values include qualifying matches

As of 28 January 2026

=== Most appearances ===
Rank	Player	Eintracht career	SC	EC / CL	EL / UC	CWC	UIC	UECL	Total
1	(Germany) Kevin Trapp	2012–2015; 2018–2025	1	8	49	–	–	9	67
2	(Germany) Charly Körbel	1972–1991	–	–	25	23	5	–	53
3	(Germany) Sebastian Rode	2010–2014; 2019–2024	1	6	36	–	–	3	46
4	(Germany) Willi Neuberger	1974–1983	–	–	25	14	6	–	45
5	(Germany) Bernd Nickel	1967–1983	–	–	20	16	6	–	42
6	(Japan) Makoto Hasebe	2014–2024	–	4	34	–	–	3	41
6	(Germany) Ansgar Knauff	2022–	1	14	18	–	–	8	41
8	(Germany) Bernd Hölzenbein	1967–1981	–	–	24	11	5	–	40
9	(Serbia) Filip Kostić	2018–2022	–	–	39	–	–	–	39
10	(Japan) Daichi Kamada	2017–2018; 2019–2023	1	8	29	–	–	–	38
10	(Brazil) Tuta	2019; 2020–2025	1	7	22	–	–	8	38

=== Top goalscorers ===
Numbers in brackets indicate appearances made. Ø = goals per game

Rank	Player	Eintracht career	SC	EC / CL	EL / UC	CWC	UIC	UECL	Total	Ø
1	(Germany) Bernd Hölzenbein	1967–1981	–	–	10 (24)	8 (11)	6 (5)	–	24 (40)	0.63
2	(Japan) Daichi Kamada	2017–2018; 2019–2023	0 (1)	3 (8)	11 (29)	–	–	–	14 (38)	0.37
3	(Ghana) Tony Yeboah	1990–1995	–	–	12 (16)	–	–	–	12 (16)	0.75
3	(Serbia) Filip Kostić	2018–2022	–	–	12 (39)	–	–	–	12 (39)	0.31
5	(Germany) Bernd Nickel	1967–1983	–	–	5 (20)	5 (16)	1 (6)	–	11 (42)	0.26
6	(Serbia) Luka Jović	2017–2019; 2021	–	–	10 (14)	–	–	–	10 (14)	0.71
7	(Poland) Jan Furtok	1993–1995	–	–	7 (14)	–	1 (1)	–	8 (15)	0.53
7	(Egypt) Omar Marmoush	2023–2025	–	–	4 (6)	–	–	4 (9)	8 (15)	0.53
9	(Germany) Alexander Meier	2004–2018	–	–	7 (9)	–	–	–	7 (9)	0.78
9	(Germany) Jürgen Grabowski	1965–1980	–	–	4 (16)	3 (12)	0 (4)	–	7 (32)	0.22

== Map ==
Eintracht Frankfurt's opponents in Europe
Red: Eintracht
Yellow: Opponents in Inter-Cities Fairs Cup / UEFA Cup / UEFA Europa League
Black: European Cup / UEFA Champions League
Green: Intertoto Cup
Blue: Cup of the Alps / Philips Trophy
Purple: Cup Winners' Cup
Pink: UEFA Super Cup
Brown: UEFA Europa Conference League

== Sources ==
- Matheja, Ulrich (2011). Unsere Eintracht - Eintracht Frankfurt - Die Chronik. Die Werkstatt. ISBN 978-3-89533-750-5.
