= 1976–77 Bundesliga =

14th season of the Bundesliga

Bundesliga
- Season: 1976–77
- Dates: 14 August 1976 – 21 May 1977
- Champions: Borussia Mönchengladbach; 5th Bundesliga title 5th German title
- Relegated: Karlsruher SC; Tennis Borussia Berlin; Rot-Weiss Essen
- European Cup: Borussia Mönchengladbach
- Cup Winners' Cup: 1. FC Köln; Hamburger SV (title holders)
- UEFA Cup: FC Schalke 04; Eintracht Braunschweig; Eintracht Frankfurt; FC Bayern Munich
- Goals: 1,061
- Average goals/game: 3.47
- Top goalscorer: Dieter Müller (34)
- Biggest home win: FC Bayern 9–0 TeBe Berlin (10 September 1976)
- Biggest away win: Essen 1–8 Frankfurt (7 May 1977); FC Bayern 0–7 Schalke (9 October 1976)
- Highest scoring: Köln 8–4 TeBe Berlin (12 goals) (26 February 1977)

The 1976–77 Bundesliga was the 14th season of the Bundesliga, West Germany's premier football league. It began on 14 August 1976 and ended on 21 May 1977. Borussia Mönchengladbach were the defending champions.

== Competition modus ==
Every team played two games against each other team, one at home and one away. Teams received two points for a win and one point for a draw. If two or more teams were tied on points, places were determined by goal difference and, if still tied, by goals scored. The team with the most points were crowned champions while the three teams with the fewest points were relegated to their respective 2. Bundesliga divisions.

== Team changes to 1975–76 ==
Hannover 96, Kickers Offenbach and Bayer 05 Uerdingen were relegated to the 2. Bundesliga after finishing in the last three places. They were replaced by Tennis Borussia Berlin, winners of the 2. Bundesliga Northern Division, 1. FC Saarbrücken, winners of the Southern Division and Borussia Dortmund, who won a two-legged promotion play-off against 1. FC Nürnberg.

== Team overview ==
Location of teams in Bundesliga 1976–77

Club	Location	Ground	Capacity
Hertha BSC Berlin	Berlin	Olympiastadion	100,000
Tennis Borussia Berlin	Berlin	Olympiastadion	100,000
VfL Bochum	Bochum	Ruhrstadion	40,000
Eintracht Braunschweig	Braunschweig	Eintracht-Stadion	38,000
SV Werder Bremen	Bremen	Weserstadion	32,000
Borussia Dortmund	Dortmund	Westfalenstadion	54,000
MSV Duisburg	Duisburg	Wedaustadion	38,500
Fortuna Düsseldorf	Düsseldorf	Rheinstadion	59,600
Rot-Weiß Essen	Essen	Georg-Melches-Stadion	40,000
Eintracht Frankfurt	Frankfurt	Waldstadion	62,000
Hamburger SV	Hamburg	Volksparkstadion	80,000
1. FC Kaiserslautern	Kaiserslautern	Stadion Betzenberg	42,000
Karlsruher SC	Karlsruhe	Wildparkstadion	50,000
1. FC Köln	Cologne	Müngersdorfer Stadion	61,000
Borussia Mönchengladbach	Mönchengladbach	Bökelbergstadion	34,500
FC Bayern Munich	Munich	Olympiastadion	77,573
1. FC Saarbrücken	Saarbrücken	Ludwigspark	40,000
FC Schalke 04	Gelsenkirchen	Parkstadion	70,000

== League table ==
Pos	Team	Pld	W	D	L	GF	GA	GD	Pts	Qualification or relegation
1	Borussia Mönchengladbach (C)	34	17	10	7	58	34	+24	44	Qualification to European Cup first round
2	Schalke 04	34	17	9	8	77	52	+25	43	Qualification to UEFA Cup first round (Note: As 1. FC Köln qualified for the Cup Winners' Cup, their UEFA Cup spot was transferred to Bayern Munich.)
3	Eintracht Braunschweig	34	15	13	6	56	38	+18	43	Qualification to UEFA Cup first round
4	Eintracht Frankfurt	34	17	8	9	86	57	+29	42	Qualification to UEFA Cup first round
5	1. FC Köln	34	17	6	11	83	61	+22	40	Qualification to Cup Winners' Cup first round (Note: Hamburger SV won the 1976–77 European Cup Winners' Cup and thereby automatically qualified as defending champions.)
6	Hamburger SV	34	14	10	10	67	56	+11	38	Qualification to Cup Winners' Cup first round
7	Bayern Munich	34	14	9	11	74	65	+9	37	Qualification to UEFA Cup first round
8	Borussia Dortmund	34	12	10	12	73	64	+9	34	
9	MSV Duisburg	34	11	12	11	60	51	+9	34	
10	Hertha BSC	34	13	8	13	55	54	+1	34	
11	Werder Bremen	34	13	7	14	51	59	−8	33	
12	Fortuna Düsseldorf	34	11	9	14	52	54	−2	31	
13	1. FC Kaiserslautern	34	12	5	17	53	59	−6	29	
14	1. FC Saarbrücken	34	9	11	14	43	55	−12	29	
15	VfL Bochum	34	11	7	16	47	62	−15	29	
16	Karlsruher SC (R)	34	9	10	15	53	75	−22	28	Relegation to 2. Bundesliga
17	Tennis Borussia Berlin (R)	34	6	10	18	47	85	−38	22	Relegation to 2. Bundesliga
18	Rot-Weiss Essen (R)	34	7	8	19	49	103	−54	22	Relegation to 2. Bundesliga

Source: www.dfb.de
Rules for classification: 1) points; 2) goal difference; 3) number of goals scored.
(C) Champions; (R) Relegated

== Results ==
Home \ Away	BSC	TBB	BOC	EBS	SVW	BVB	DUI	F95	RWE	SGE	HSV	FCK	KSC	KOE	BMG	FCB	FCS	S04
Hertha BSC	—	2–0	2–0	2–1	2–1	3–2	2–4	4–0	2–1	2–3	2–1	2–0	1–1	2–4	0–1	1–1	1–1	2–1
Tennis Borussia Berlin	2–0	—	1–1	0–0	2–4	2–3	1–5	4–2	2–2	1–1	1–1	4–2	4–2	3–2	0–1	3–1	1–1	1–3
VfL Bochum	4–2	2–1	—	1–1	0–2	2–1	2–1	1–2	2–1	3–1	4–2	1–0	1–0	1–2	0–0	5–6	1–2	1–2
Eintracht Braunschweig	2–2	3–1	2–0	—	0–1	3–1	1–1	0–0	6–0	3–1	0–1	2–1	3–3	4–2	1–1	1–0	1–0	1–0
Werder Bremen	1–0	0–0	2–0	2–2	—	3–0	2–2	0–2	3–1	2–1	2–2	2–0	1–1	2–1	1–0	2–3	1–0	1–1
Borussia Dortmund	2–1	4–0	0–2	0–0	2–4	—	2–1	1–2	4–2	2–2	4–4	5–2	7–2	1–2	0–0	3–3	2–1	2–2
MSV Duisburg	1–1	1–1	0–0	1–1	3–0	0–0	—	1–0	4–0	4–3	0–0	1–0	3–1	1–1	3–2	5–2	2–3	2–2
Fortuna Düsseldorf	2–3	0–0	1–0	1–3	3–2	3–2	2–0	—	4–4	1–2	2–0	2–3	3–0	1–3	0–1	0–0	5–1	1–2
Rot-Weiss Essen	2–2	1–0	3–3	2–1	0–0	1–5	1–5	5–3	—	1–8	1–2	3–2	3–2	0–3	1–0	1–4	1–0	2–2
Eintracht Frankfurt	3–3	7–1	2–2	3–0	7–1	1–4	3–1	1–1	3–1	—	2–1	2–0	3–2	4–0	1–3	2–1	2–1	6–3
Hamburger SV	2–0	2–1	5–1	0–2	5–3	3–4	2–0	1–1	5–3	3–1	—	1–0	2–1	2–1	4–1	5–0	0–0	2–2
1. FC Kaiserslautern	0–2	3–1	2–0	1–3	4–2	2–1	2–0	0–2 (Note: The 1. FC Kaiserslautern v Fortuna Düsseldorf match from 27 November 1976 was suspended after 76 minutes and a score of 0–1 due to bottles being repeatedly thrown from the stands. The match was abandoned and later awarded to Fortuna Düsseldorf with a score of 0–2.)	7–1	2–2	2–0	—	3–1	4–2	1–2	1–1	1–0	2–0
Karlsruher SC	0–3	4–1	2–1	1–1	3–1	2–1	2–1	1–1	1–1	2–0	2–2	1–1	—	2–1	4–0	1–2	3–0	1–7
1. FC Köln	3–2	8–4	6–1	3–0	3–0	1–1	5–2	2–2	2–2	2–0	3–3	3–1	4–1	—	0–3	3–0	5–1	2–0
Borussia Mönchengladbach	2–1	3–0	4–2	1–1	3–1	1–1	1–1	3–1	6–0	1–3	0–0	0–0	5–1	3–1	—	1–0	3–0	2–0
Bayern Munich	1–0	9–0	1–1	2–2	1–0	1–2	2–2	2–1	5–1	0–3	6–2	3–0	5–0	4–1	2–2	—	5–1	0–7
1. FC Saarbrücken	1–1	0–0	0–1	1–2	2–0	2–2	1–0	0–0	2–1	2–2	3–2	2–2	1–1	3–1	2–2	6–1	—	2–3
Schalke 04	4–0	5–4	3–1	2–3	3–2	4–2	3–2	2–1	3–0	1–1	1–0	5–2	2–2	1–1	1–0	0–0	0–1	—

Source: DFB
Legend: Blue = home team win; Yellow = draw; Red = away team win.

== Top goalscorers ==
34 goals

- (Germany) Dieter Müller (1. FC Köln)

28 goals

- (Germany) Gerd Müller (FC Bayern Munich)

26 goals

- (Germany) Bernd Hölzenbein (Eintracht Frankfurt)

24 goals

- (Germany) Klaus Fischer (FC Schalke 04)
- (Germany) Wolfgang Frank (Eintracht Braunschweig)

21 goals

- (Germany) Josef Kaczor (VfL Bochum)

20 goals

- (Germany) Horst Hrubesch (Rot-Weiß Essen)
- (Sweden) Benny Wendt (Tennis Borussia Berlin)
- (Germany) Rüdiger Wenzel (Eintracht Frankfurt)

19 goals

- (Germany) Klaus Toppmöller (1. FC Kaiserslautern)

== Champion squad ==
Borussia Mönchengladbach
Goalkeeper: Wolfgang Kneib (34).

Defenders: Rainer Bonhof (33 / 6); Hans-Jürgen Wittkamp (33 / 5); Hans Klinkhammer (29); Horst Wohlers (27 / 2); Berti Vogts (captain; 27 / 1); Frank Schäffer (27); Norbert Ringels (7).
Midfielders: Herbert Wimmer (31 / 2); Uli Stielike (24 / 4); Horst Köppel (22 / 3); Wilfried Hannes (21 / 3); Christian Kulik (18 / 1); Dietmar Danner (3).
Forwards: Allan Simonsen (Denmark) (34 / 12); Jupp Heynckes (20 / 15); Herbert Heidenreich (20 / 2); Karl Del'Haye (16 / 1); Carsten Nielsen (Denmark) (1).
(league appearances and goals listed in brackets)

Manager: Udo Lattek.

On the roster but have not played in a league game: Wolfgang Kleff; Hans-Jakob Klingen; Ulrich Sude; Gerd Engels; Hans-Jürgen Offermanns; Rudi Gores.

== See also ==
- 1976–77 DFB-Pokal
