= Harald Karger =

German footballer

Personal information
- Full name: Harald Karger
- Date of birth: 14 October 1956 (age 70)
- Place of birth: Weilburg, West Germany
- Position: Striker

Youth career
- TuS Waldhausen
- –1979: FC Burgsolms

Senior career*
Years	Team	Apps	(Gls)
1979–1983	Eintracht Frankfurt	28	(9)
1983–1984	SV Wiesbaden		
1984–1987	SpVgg EGC Wirges		
1987	VfL Bad Ems		
1989	FC Werdorf		

Managerial career
- 2000–2010: Eintracht Frankfurt (Youth)
- * Club domestic league appearances and goals

Harald Karger (born 14 October 1956 in Weilburg) is a former German footballer.

== Playing career ==
Karger moved from amateur club FC Burgsolms to the Bundesliga side Eintracht Frankfurt in 1979. The qualified mail man scored nine goals in 23 appearances in his first season. In the UEFA cup Karger netted as well for his club and he scored in the first leg of the 1980 UEFA Cup Final against Borussia Mönchengladbach. The rising star suffered a collateral ligament damage in this match, which meant he missed the second leg. He only made a handful of further Bundesliga appearances after this injury. He was on the bench when Frankfurt won the 1981 DFB-Pokal Final the following season.

Because of his heading strength, Karger was awarded the nickname Schädel-Harry (Skull Harry) by journalists.

== Manager career ==
After initial tenures at some local amateur clubs, Karger is one of twenty youth coaches in the football academy of Eintracht Frankfurt and works together with former Eintracht players like Charly Körbel, Ralf Weber and Norbert Nachtweih.
