= Kneib =

Kneib is a surname. Notable people with the surname include:

- Viktor Kneib (born 1980), Russian luger
- Wolfgang Kneib (born 1952), German footballer
