= Bodeker =

Bodeker may refer to:

- ST Bodeker or Empire Mead, an Empire ship

== People with the surname ==
- Bill Boedeker (1924–2014), American football player
- Friedrich Bödeker (1867–1937), German botanist
- Ralf Bödeker (born 1958), German footballer
