= Paul Courant (footballer) =

Belgian footballer

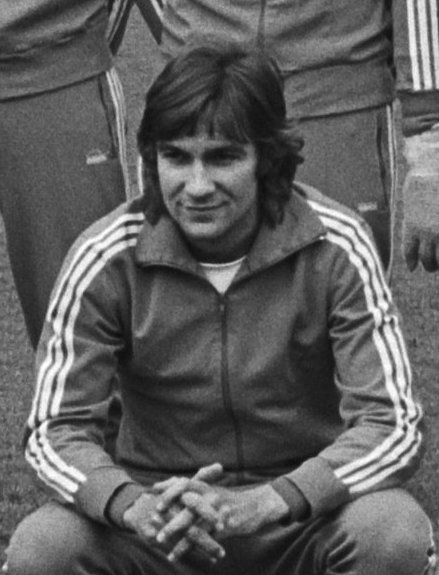

Personal information
- Date of birth: 1 November 1949 (age 76)
- Place of birth: Kortenaken, Belgium
- Position: Midfielder

International career
Years	Team	Apps	(Gls)
1976–1978	Belgium	6	(1)

Paul Courant (born 1 November 1949) is a Belgian footballer. He played in six matches for the Belgium national football team from 1976 to 1978.

== Honours ==
Individual

- Man of the Season (Belgian First Division): 1975–76
