= Rigobert Gruber =

German footballer

Personal information
- Date of birth: 14 May 1961 (age 65)
- Place of birth: Worms, Germany
- Height: 1.84 m (6 ft 0 in)
- Positions: Centre-back; libero

Youth career
- Blau-Weiß Worms

Senior career*
Years	Team	Apps	(Gls)
1979–1981	Eintracht Frankfurt	21	(1)
1981–1986	Werder Bremen	89	(12)
Total		110	(13)

International career
1979–1982	West Germany U21	9	(3)
1982	West Germany B	1	(0)
- * Club domestic league appearances and goals

Rigobert Gruber (born 14 May 1961) is a German former professional footballer who played as a centre-back or libero.

Gruber retired from football at the age of 26 after suffering a serious knee injury.

== Personal life ==
In 2021, Gruber featured in Schwarze Adler, a documentary detailing the experiences of Black players in German professional football.

== Career statistics ==
=== Club ===
Appearances and goals by club, season and competition
Club	Season	League			Cup (Note: Includes DFB-Pokal)		Europe (Note: Includes UEFA Cup)		Total	
Club	Season	Division	Apps	Goals	Apps	Goals	Apps	Goals	Apps	Goals
Eintracht Frankfurt	1979–80	Bundesliga	12	0	1	0	1	0	14	0
Eintracht Frankfurt	1980–81	Bundesliga	9	1	2	0	1	0	12	1
Eintracht Frankfurt	Total		21	1	3	0	2	0	26	1
Werder Bremen	1981–82	Bundesliga	34	8	5	4	—		39	12
Werder Bremen	1982–83	Bundesliga	28	3	2	0	5	1	35	4
Werder Bremen	1983–84	Bundesliga	27	1	4	0	4	0	35	1
Werder Bremen	Total		89	12	11	4	9	1	109	17
Career total			110	13	14	4	11	1	135	18

== Honours ==
Eintracht Frankfurt

- 1979–80 UEFA Cup
- 1980–81 DFB-Pokal
