= Werner Lorant =

German footballer and manager (1948–2025)

Personal information
- Full name: Werner Heinz Erich Lorant
- Date of birth: 21 November 1948
- Place of birth: Welver, North Rhine-Westphalia, Germany
- Date of death: 20 April 2025 (aged 76)
- Place of death: Wasserburg am Inn, Bavaria, Germany
- Height: 1.72 m (5 ft 8 in)
- Positions: Defender; defensive midfielder

Senior career*
Years	Team	Apps	(Gls)
1971–1973	Borussia Dortmund	23	(0)
1973–1977	Rot-Weiss Essen	116	(16)
1977–1978	1. FC Saarbrücken	34	(9)
1978–1982	Eintracht Frankfurt	137	(21)
1982–1983	Schalke 04	18	(0)
1983–1984	Hannover 96	33	(8)
Total		361	(54)

Managerial career
- 1986–1990: 1. FC Schweinfurt 05
- 1990–1992: Viktoria Aschaffenburg
- 1992–2001: 1860 Munich
- 2002: Fenerbahçe
- 2002–2003: LR Ahlen
- 2003–2004: Incheon United
- 2005: APOEL
- 2005–2006: Sivasspor
- 2006: Saipa Karaj
- 2006–2007: Kayseri Erciyesspor
- 2007: SpVgg Unterhaching
- 2007: Kasımpaşa
- 2008: Liaoning
- 2008: SV ATA Spor München
- 2008–2009: DAC Dunajská Streda
- 2012: DAC Dunajská Streda
- 2015: TSV Waging
- 2017: ÖTSU Hallein
- 2019: FC Hallein 04
- * Club domestic league appearances and goals

Werner Heinz Erich Lorant (21 November 1948 – 20 April 2025) was a German football player who played as a defender or as a defensive midfielder. He later became a manager, notably managing TSV 1860 Munich for nine years between 1992 and 2001 and taking the club from the third division to the UEFA Cup.

== Playing career ==
Born in Welver, North Rhine-Westphalia, Lorant commenced his professional career in 1970, in the second division with Westfalia Herne. In 1971, he moved to Borussia Dortmund. There he was part of a team that lost 11–1 against Bayern Munich and was relegated in 1972. He stuck with the club in its first second-division season, but later joined Rot-Weiss Essen in 1973, who had just been promoted to the Bundesliga. Lorant stayed with the struggling club around their star Willi Lippens and players like Manfred Burgsmüller and Horst Hrubesch until relegation in 1977. Then he joined 1. FC Saarbrücken for a season, experiencing his third relegation.

The next four-and-a-half years he spent with Eintracht Frankfurt. With the club, he won the UEFA Cup 1980, prevailing in the finals against Borussia Mönchengladbach. In 1981, he helped win the DFB-Pokal with a 3–1 victory in the final against 1. FC Kaiserslautern. With Frankfurt, Lorant played, amongst others, alongside the World Cup winners of 1974 Jürgen Grabowski and Bernd Hölzenbein. Other notable players were Norbert Nachtweih, Bernd Nickel and the Austrian international Bruno Pezzey.

Lorant left Eintracht mid-season 1982–1983 for FC Schalke 04, who had just been promoted to the Bundesliga. By the end of the season, he had to face the fourth relegation of his career. He then quickly moved on to second-division team Hannover 96, where he ended his time as a professional player after one season.

== Coaching career ==
After a brief stint as part-time coach of an amateur team in 1982, he commenced a full-time coaching career as player-manager of SV Heidingsfeld from 1984 to 1986 and with 1. FC Schweinfurt 05 from 1986 to 1990, with which he achieved the then-amateur third division championship and promotion. From 1990 to 1992, he coached Viktoria Aschaffenburg, also in the third division, where he won the championship in 1992.

After this he was hired by TSV 1860 Munich, a team that had been dwelling for some years in the third division. He took the club to the first division within two years and in 1997 qualified for the UEFA Cup, where 1860 was ousted in the first round by Austrian team Rapid Wien. In 2000, he led 1860 into the qualification for the Champions League, where the team lost against Leeds United with 2–1 and 1–0. In the ensuing UEFA Cup campaign, 1860 Munich was stopped by Italian club AC Parma; after a respectable 2–2 draw away, 1860 Munich lost the home leg 2–0. During the season, a sweltering conflict with club president Karl-Heinz Wildmoser came to a head after the team lost the derby against Bayern Munich 5–1, and Lorant was let go.

Notable players during his tenure with 1860 were the German internationals Thomas Häßler and Martin Max, who played there from 1999 in the twilight of their careers. Max became top scorer of the Bundesliga twice in this phase. German international Jens Jeremies was discovered at the club during Lorant's tenure. Foreign internationals were, amongst others, Abédi Pelé from Ghana, Harald Cerny from Austria, Miroslav Stevic from Serbia, as well as Australians Paul Agostino and Ned Zelic. Horst Heldt, Olaf Bodden, Manfred Schwabl and Bernhard Trares were further players of note in this era.

In the ensuing years, Lorant coached SpVgg Unterhaching and LR Ahlen in Germany, Fenerbahçe, Sivasspor, Kayseri Erciyesspor and Kasımpaşa in Turkey, APOEL in Cyprus, Saipa Teheran in Iran, Incheon United in South Korea, Liaoning Hongyun in China, and DAC Dunajská Streda in Slovakia. Most of these engagements ended up being very short term and the clubs were often struggling to retain the class. With Apoel in Cyprus, where Lorant spent two months in 2005, he became runner-up in the championship; however, the club hoped that he would take them to the title.

In March 2010, he was appointed sporting director of German fourth division club Tennis Borussia Berlin; however, the club folded in May.

In April 2015, Lorant was appointed manager of TSV Waging until the end of the season. In January 2017, he took charge of Austrian club ÖTSU Hallein. In April 2019, he took charge of Austrian fifth division club FC Hallein 04 until the end of the season.

== Death ==
Lorant died in Wasserburg am Inn on 20 April 2025, at the age of 76. He had been seriously ill for a year and a half.
