= Herbert Heidenreich =

German footballer

Personal information
- Full name: Herbert Heidenreich
- Date of birth: 15 November 1954 (age 71)
- Place of birth: Euben, West Germany
- Height: 1.76 m (5 ft 9 in)
- Positions: Midfielder; striker

Senior career*
Years	Team	Apps	(Gls)
1975–1976	SpVgg Bayreuth	58	(15)
1976–1977	Borussia Mönchengladbach	25	(2)
1977–1978	Tennis Borussia Berlin	23	(4)
1978–1984	1. FC Nürnberg	171	(26)
Total		277	(47)
- * Club domestic league appearances and goals

Herbert Heidenreich (born 15 November 1954 in Euben) is a retired German football player. He spent seven seasons in the Bundesliga with Borussia Mönchengladbach and 1. FC Nürnberg.

== Honours ==
- European Cup finalist: 1976–77
- Bundesliga champion: 1976–77
- Bundesliga runner-up: 1977–78
- DFB-Pokal finalist: 1981–82
