= Jürgen Pahl =

German footballer

Personal information
- Date of birth: 17 March 1956 (age 70)
- Place of birth: Teuchern, East Germany
- Height: 1.85 m (6 ft 1 in)
- Position: Goalkeeper

Senior career*
Years	Team	Apps	(Gls)
1973–1976	Chemie Halle		
1976–1987	Eintracht Frankfurt	152	(0)
1987–1989	Çaykur Rizespor	60	(0)
- * Club domestic league appearances and goals

Jürgen Pahl (born 17 March 1956 in Teuchern, East Germany) is a German former football goalkeeper. He fled together with Norbert Nachtweih from a match of the East Germany under-21 team to West Germany and was subsequently banned for a year. He played from 1978 to 1987 in the Bundesliga for Eintracht Frankfurt and won the 1979–80 UEFA Cup and 1980–81 DFB-Pokal with them.

Pahl now lives in Paraguay.

== See also ==
- List of Soviet and Eastern Bloc defectors
