= Fred Schaub =

German footballer (1960–2003)

Personal information
- Date of birth: 28 August 1960
- Place of birth: Heubach, Germany
- Date of death: 22 April 2003 (aged 42)
- Height: 1.75 m (5 ft 9 in)
- Position: Forward

Youth career
- –1976: SV Neuhof
- 1976–1978: Eintracht Frankfurt

Senior career*
Years	Team	Apps	(Gls)
1978–1980	Eintracht Frankfurt	21	(3)
1981–1983	SpVgg Fürth	84	(36)
1983	Borussia Dortmund	6	(1)
1983–1986	Hannover 96	83	(22)
1986–1988	SC Freiburg	69	(18)
1988–1990	FC Admira/Wacker		
1990–1992	VfB Mödling		
1992–1993	Favoritner AC		
1993–1995	Germania Fulda		
1995	FV Neuhof		
1999	USC Wampersdorf		
2002	ASK Oberwaltersdorf		

Managerial career
- 1993: Favoritner AC
- * Club domestic league appearances and goals

Fred Schaub (28 August 1960 – 22 April 2003) was a German professional football played as a forward. He is best remembered for scoring the winning goal for Eintracht Frankfurt in the 1979–80 UEFA Cup final.

The 17-year-old Schaub joined German Bundesliga side Eintracht Frankfurt at the beginning of the 1978–79 season. He stayed with the club until the winter break of the 1980–81 season. Though a promising talent, he never lived fully up to expectations, and appeared in only 21 league matches for the "Eagles", in which he scored three goals. However, his goal engraved him forever in the club's history.

== Career ==
=== UEFA Cup final glory ===
In May 1980, Eintracht met domestic rivals Borussia Mönchengladbach in the all-German final of the 1979–80 UEFA Cup. They lost the first leg 3–2 in Mönchengladbach. In the second leg in Frankfurt a fortnight later, the game was still deadlocked goalless when, in the 77th minute, Eintracht coach Friedel Rausch took off defender Norbert Nachtweih and replaced him with Schaub. Only four minutes later, the youngster scored what would prove to be the only goal of the match, and thus secured the first win in a European competition for Eintracht Frankfurt.

=== Subsequent Bundesliga career ===
From January 1981 until June 1983, Schaub played in the second division for SpVgg Fürth, where he scored 36 goals in 84 matches, a good enough record for Borussia Dortmund to provide him with an opportunity for a comeback in the Bundesliga. He failed to do well there, and by the time of the 1983–84 winter break he had returned to the second division, this time to Hannover 96. There, he became a regular, and remained so as Hannover attained promotion to the Bundesliga in 1985. The following year, however, they were relegated back to the second division in bottom place.

Schaub moved on to another second division club, SC Freiburg, where he was a first-choice player for the next two years.

=== In Austria ===
At the beginning of the 1988–89 season, Schaub moved to Austrian first division side FC Admira/Wacker in Vienna. There, he impressed with his fighting spirit, and together with Gerhard Rodax and Walter Knaller he formed a dangerous forward line. In his first season, the club finished runner-up in the championship and reached the cup final, losing both competitions to the then mighty FC Tirol Innsbruck, who were coached by the legendary Ernst Happel. Nevertheless, the club has not had a more successful year since.

The following season, 1989–90, Schaub experienced his final European Cup campaign, this time in the European Cup-Winners' Cup, where subsequent finalists Anderlecht eliminated Admira in the quarter-finals.

In his time with the club, Schaub scored 23 goals in 68 matches. In 1989, he was voted second best foreign player in Austria after his compatriot Hansi Müller.

After his time with Admira, he had a spell with newly promoted VfB Mödling, second division side Favoritner AC and, finally, amateur outfit USC Wampersdorf.

After his playing career, Schaub remained in Austria. By 2003, he was working as a coach of the under-17s at VfB Admira Wacker Mödling, a club which was created in 1997 from a merger of his first two Austrian clubs.

== Death ==
On 22 April 2003, Schaub was killed in an automobile accident on the Bundesautobahn 7 near Fulda. Returning to Austria from visiting his mother, his car crashed into a truck. His eight-year-old son Louis suffered serious injuries, but survived.
