= Hans-Jürgen Wittkamp =

German footballer

Personal information
- Date of birth: 23 July 1947 (age 79)
- Place of birth: Gelsenkirchen, Germany
- Height: 1.76 m (5 ft 9 in)
- Positions: Defender; striker; midfielder

Senior career*
Years	Team	Apps	(Gls)
1967–1971	FC Schalke 04	101	(30)
1971–1978	Borussia Mönchengladbach	179	(29)
1978–1981	SpVgg Erkenschwick		
- * Club domestic league appearances and goals

Hans-Jürgen Wittkamp (born 23 July 1947) is a German former football player. He spent 11 seasons in the Bundesliga with FC Schalke 04 and Borussia Mönchengladbach.
