= Wilfried Hannes =

German footballer (born 1957)

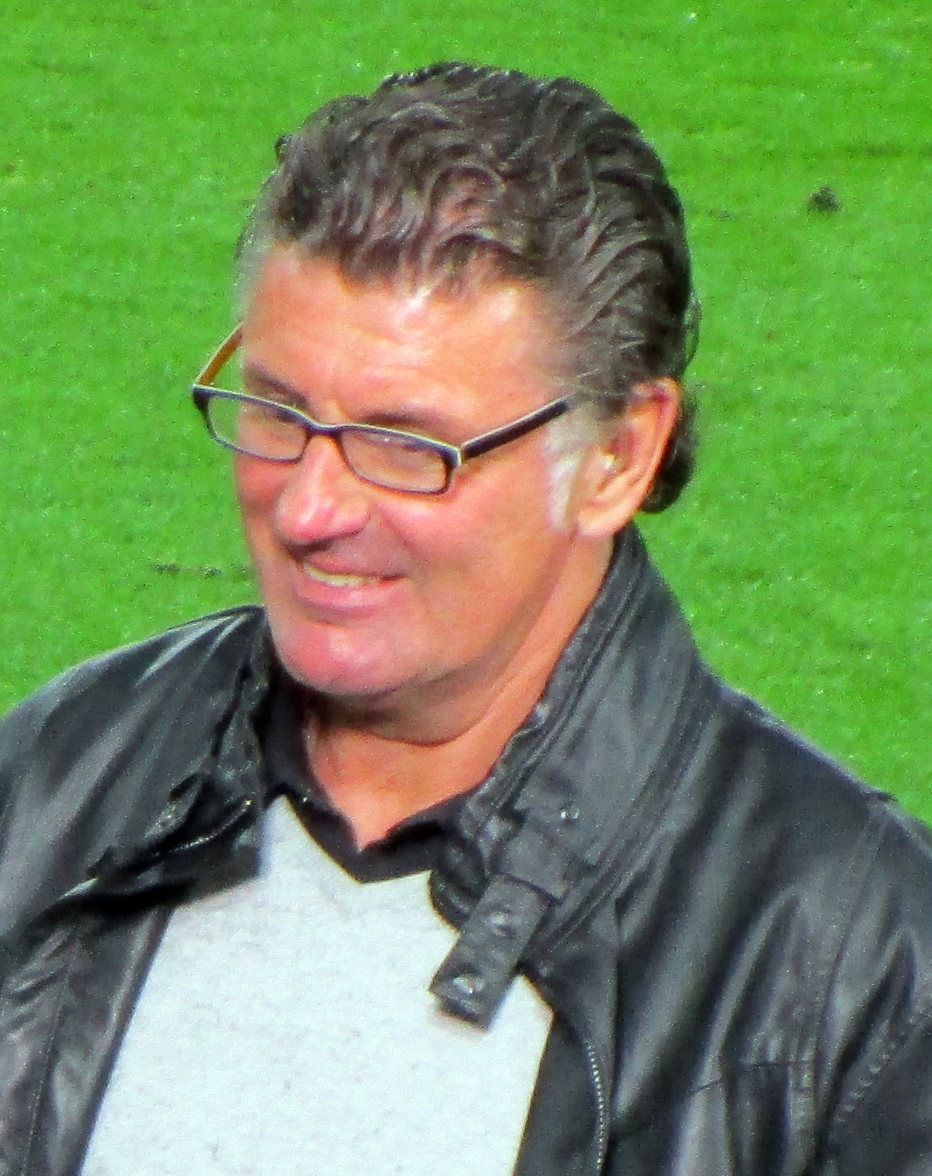

Personal information
- Date of birth: 17 May 1957 (age 69)
- Place of birth: Düren-Echtz, West Germany
- Height: 1.88 m (6 ft 2 in)
- Position: Sweeper

Team information
- Current team: Borussia Freialdenhoven (manager)

Youth career
- Sportfreunde Düren
- Düren 99

Senior career*
| Years | Team | Apps | (Gls) |
| 1975–1986 | Borussia Mönchengladbach | 261 | (58) |
| 1986–1988 | Schalke 04 | 48 | (4) |
| 1988 | Bellinzona | 29 | (5) |
| 1989 | FC Aarau | 13 | (1) |
| Total | | 351 | (68) |

International career
| 1979–1980 | West Germany B | 6 | (1) |
| 1981–1982 | West Germany | 8 | (0) |

Managerial career
- 1991–1994: Alemannia Aachen
- 1995–1998: Rhenania Würselen
- 1999–2003: Borussia Freialdenhoven
- 2003–2004: GFC Düren
- 2004–: Borussia Freialdenhoven
- * Club domestic league appearances and goals

Wilfried Hannes (born 17 May 1957) is a German former professional footballer who played as a defender, and manager, known for achieving his career despite being visually impaired after a pupil-tumour had caused him to lose his sight in his right eye as a child.

== Club career ==
Hannes was born in Düren-Echtz, Germany. At first a striker, he was a defender in his professional career for Borussia Mönchengladbach, he joined the club during the Bundesliga Championship and UEFA Cup winning season of 1975. He was a fan favourite and a crucial player, he went on to collect two more German Bundesliga titles in 1976 and 1977 and the UEFA Cup in 1979. In his years with the club he also helped them to European Cup runners-up in 1977, UEFA Cup runners-up in 1980 and German Cup runners-up in 1984.

== International career ==
His international career for West Germany lasted for just about one year in the early 1980s. In these months he won eight caps, three of them in the qualification for the 1982 FIFA World Cup. He went to the 1982 FIFA World Cup with West Germany and they came runners-up in the tournament but Hannes wasn't used on the pitch. The fact he only made eight appearances was more to do with the great defensive partnership of the Förster brothers at that time rather than his lack of ability.

Lothar Matthäus has been previously quoted has saying that during his early career at Borussia Mönchengladbach he learnt a lot from Wilfried Hannes whilst playing alongside him.

== Coaching career ==
His career as manager includes spells at Alemannia Aachen (1991–1994) and other clubs of the size of fourth divisional outfits. Lately he coached SC Borussia 1912 Freialdenhoven in the fifth division.

== Career statistics ==
=== Club ===
Appearances and goals by club, season and competition
| Club | Season | League | | | Cup | | Continental | | Other | | Total | |
| Club | Season | Division | Apps | Goals | Apps | Goals | Apps | Goals | Apps | Goals | Apps | Goals |
|---|---|---|---|---|---|---|---|---|---|---|---|---|
| Borussia Mönchengladbach | 1975–76 | Bundesliga | 9 | 1 | | | 1 | 0 | | | 10 | 1 |
| Borussia Mönchengladbach | 1976–77 | Bundesliga | 21 | 3 | | | 3 | 1 | | | 24 | 4 |
| Borussia Mönchengladbach | 1977–78 | Bundesliga | 21 | 0 | 1 | 0 | 5 | 1 | 2 (Note: Appearances in Intercontinental Cup) | 1 | 29 | 2 |
| Borussia Mönchengladbach | 1978–79 | Bundesliga | 22 | 1 | 1 | 0 | 7 | 0 | – | | 30 | 1 |
| Borussia Mönchengladbach | 1979–80 | Bundesliga | 32 | 4 | 3 | 0 | 11 | 2 | – | | 46 | 6 |
| Borussia Mönchengladbach | 1980–81 | Bundesliga | 33 | 16 | 5 | 3 | 0 | 0 | – | | 38 | 19 |
| Borussia Mönchengladbach | 1981–82 | Bundesliga | 31 | 8 | 4 | 1 | 3 | 1 | – | | 38 | 10 |
| Borussia Mönchengladbach | 1982–83 | Bundesliga | 23 | 9 | 2 | 3 | 0 | 0 | – | | 25 | 12 |
| Borussia Mönchengladbach | 1983–84 | Bundesliga | 25 | 6 | 6 | 1 | 0 | 0 | – | | 31 | 7 |
| Borussia Mönchengladbach | 1984–85 | Bundesliga | 23 | 4 | 2 | 0 | 3 | 0 | – | | 28 | 4 |
| Borussia Mönchengladbach | 1985–86 | Bundesliga | 21 | 6 | 2 | 0 | 4 | 0 | – | | 27 | 6 |
| Borussia Mönchengladbach | Total | | 261 | 58 | 26 | 8 | 37 | 5 | 2 | 1 | 326 | 72 |
| Schalke 04 | 1986–87 | Bundesliga | 27 | 1 | 0 | 0 | – | | – | | 27 | 1 |
| Schalke 04 | 1987–88 | Bundesliga | 21 | 3 | 1 | 0 | – | | – | | 22 | 3 |
| Schalke 04 | Total | | 48 | 4 | 1 | 0 | 0 | 0 | 0 | 0 | 49 | 4 |
| Bellinzona | 1988–89 | Swiss Super League | 29 | 5 | | | – | | | | 29 | 5 |
| FC Aarau | 1989–90 | Swiss Super League | 13 | 1 | | | – | | | | 13 | 1 |
| Career total | | | 351 | 68 | 27 | 8 | 37 | 5 | 2 | 1 | 417 | 82 |

== Honours ==
Borussia Mönchengladbach

- Bundesliga: 1975–76, 1976–77
- UEFA Cup: 1978–79
