= Ralf Bödeker =

German footballer

Personal information
- Date of birth: 12 May 1958 (age 68)
- Place of birth: West Germany
- Position: Midfielder

Senior career*
Years	Team	Apps	(Gls)
1978–1982	Borussia Mönchengladbach	32	(1)
- * Club domestic league appearances and goals

Ralf Bödeker (born 12 May 1958) is a German former footballer who played as a midfielder.

== Career ==
Between 1978 and 1982, Bödeker played for Borussia Mönchengladbach. He made 32 appearances and scored one goal in the Bundesliga.

== Honours ==
- UEFA Cup: 1978–79
- Kirin Cup: 1978 (Shared with SE Palmeiras)
