= Willi Neuberger =

German footballer

Personal information
- Date of birth: 15 April 1946 (age 80)
- Place of birth: Röllfeld, Germany
- Height: 1.75 m (5 ft 9 in)
- Position: Defender

Youth career
- 1955–1966: TuS Röllfeld

Senior career*
Years	Team	Apps	(Gls)
1966–1971	Borussia Dortmund	148	(26)
1971–1973	Werder Bremen	63	(11)
1973–1974	Wuppertaler SV	42	(5)
1974–1983	Eintracht Frankfurt	267	(18)
Total		520	(62)

International career
1968	West Germany	2	(0)
- * Club domestic league appearances and goals

Willi Neuberger (born 15 April 1946 in Röllfeld) is a German former professional footballer who played as a defender.

He played from 1966 until 1983 in the Bundesliga for Borussia Dortmund, Werder Bremen, Wuppertaler SV and Eintracht Frankfurt. With Eintracht he won the DFB-Pokal in 1975 and 1981 and UEFA Cup in 1980.

With his 520 Bundesliga appearances he was the record player for a long time before he was overtaken by teammate Charly Körbel. As of April 2011 he is eighth on the all-time appearance list of the Bundesliga.

He won two caps for West Germany in 1968.
