= Ronny Borchers =

German footballer (1957–2024)

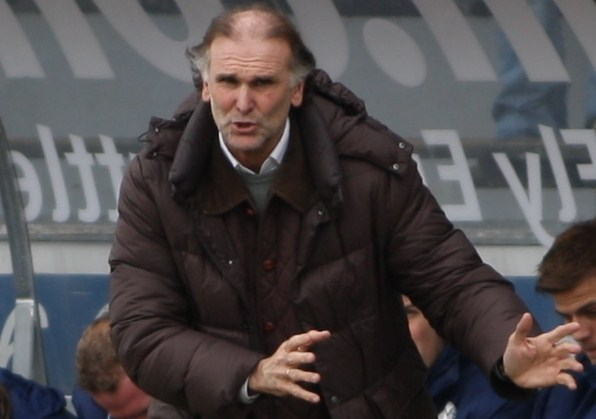
- Borchers with Viktoria Aschaffenburg in 2009

Personal information
- Full name: Ronald Borchers
- Date of birth: 10 August 1957
- Place of birth: Frankfurt, Hesse, West Germany
- Date of death: 18 August 2024 (aged 67)
- Height: 1.85 m (6 ft 1 in)
- Position: Midfielder

Youth career
- 1966–1968: SV Niederursel
- 1968–1970: Germania Ginnheim
- 1970–1975: Eintracht Frankfurt

Senior career*
Years	Team	Apps	(Gls)
1975–1984	Eintracht Frankfurt	169	(24)
1984–1985	Arminia Bielefeld	26	(4)
1985–1986	Grasshoppers	15	(1)
1986–1987	Waldhof Mannheim	18	(0)
1987–1989	FSV Frankfurt		
1989–1991	Kickers Offenbach		
1991–1992	Eintracht Frankfurt Amateure		
1992–1993	SV Bernbach		

International career
1978–1981	West Germany	6	(0)

Managerial career
- 1994–1995: SV Bernbach
- 1996–1997: Kickers Offenbach
- 1998: FSV Frankfurt
- 2004: SV Bernbach
- 2007–2008: Germania Ober-Roden
- 2008–2009: Viktoria Aschaffenburg
- 2010: TGM SV Jügesheim
- 2010–2012: Wormatia Worms
- 2013–2014: FSV Fernwald
- 2014–2017: FC 07 Bensheim
- * Club domestic league appearances and goals

Ronald "Ronny" Borchers (10 August 1957 – 18 August 2024) was a German football player and coach.

== Club career ==
Between 1975 and 1987, he played for Eintracht Frankfurt, Arminia Bielefeld and Waldhof Mannheim in the Bundesliga. With Eintracht, he won the UEFA Cup in 1979–80 and the DFB-Pokal in 1980–81.

== International career ==
Between 1978 and 1981, he played six times for West Germany.

== Coaching career ==
Following his playing career, Borchers became a coach for lower-league German teams. Since September 2010, he was managing Wormatia Worms. He was the manager of FC 07 Bensheim between 2014 and 2017.

== Death ==
Borchers died on 18 August 2024, at the age of 67.

== Honours ==
Eintracht Frankfurt

- UEFA Cup: 1979–80
- DFB-Pokal: 1980–81
