= Wolfgang Trapp =

German footballer and coach

Personal information
- Date of birth: August 1, 1957 (age 69)
- Height: 1.80 m (5 ft 11 in)
- Positions: Midfielder; defender

Youth career
- Eintracht Frankfurt

Senior career*
Years	Team	Apps	(Gls)
1977–1981	Eintracht Frankfurt	50	(0)
1981–1983	SV Darmstadt 98	43	(9)
1983–1984	Kickers Offenbach	46	(6)
1984–1985	Union Solingen	10	(0)
1985–1991	Karlsruher SC	159	(13)
1991–1993	ASV Durlach		

Managerial career
- 1991–1995: ASV Durlach
- FVP Maximiliansau
- * Club domestic league appearances and goals

Wolfgang Trapp (born August 1, 1957) is a German former footballer who became a coach.

== Honours ==
- UEFA Cup winner: 1980.
- DFB-Pokal winner: 1981.
