= Carsten Nielsen =

Danish footballer (born 1955)

Personal information
- Date of birth: 12 August 1955 (age 71)
- Place of birth: Copenhagen, Denmark
- Height: 1.85 m (6 ft 1 in)
- Position: Midfielder

Senior career*
Years	Team	Apps	(Gls)
1975–1976	B 1903		
1976–1981	Borussia Mönchengladbach	109	(23)
1981–1985	RC Strasbourg		
1985–1986	Neuchâtel Xamax FC		
1986–1987	CS Chênois		
1987–1989	Neuchâtel Xamax FC		
1990	Kjøbenhavns Boldklub		

International career
1975–1977	Denmark U-21	7	(2)
1975–1979	Denmark	4	(0)
- * Club domestic league appearances and goals

Carsten Nielsen (born 12 August 1955) is a Danish former football player.

== Honours ==
Neuchâtel Xamax

- Swiss Super League: 1987–88
- Swiss Super Cup: 1987
