= Frank Schäffer =

German footballer (1952–2024)

Personal information
- Date of birth: 6 July 1952
- Place of birth: Leonberg, Baden-Württemberg, West Germany
- Date of death: 15 November 2024 (aged 72)
- Position: Defender

Youth career
- TSV Eltingen

Senior career*
Years	Team	Apps	(Gls)
1973–1974	SpVgg Ludwigsburg		
1974–1983	Borussia Mönchengladbach	229	(6)
- * Club domestic league appearances and goals

Frank Schäffer (6 July 1952 – 15 November 2024) was a German footballer who played as a defender and later a singer. He spent nine seasons in the Bundesliga with Borussia Mönchengladbach winning the Bundesliga three times, the UEFA Cup twice and reaching the 1977 European Cup final which they lost 3-1 to Liverpool. He later became lead singer with the band Eddy & the News, with whom he sang for over 20 years. Schäffer died on 15 November 2024, at the age of 72.

== Honours ==
Borussia Mönchengladbach

- European Cup finalist: 1977
- UEFA Cup: 1975, 1979; runner-up 1980
- Bundesliga: 1975, 1976, 1977; runner-up 1978
