= Wolfgang Kneib =

German footballer

Personal information
- Date of birth: 20 November 1952 (age 73)
- Place of birth: Zornheim, West Germany
- Height: 1.96 m (6 ft 5 in)
- Position: Goalkeeper

Youth career
- TSV Zornheim

Senior career*
Years	Team	Apps	(Gls)
1969–1975	Mainz 05		
1975–1976	SV Wiesbaden		
1976–1980	Borussia Mönchengladbach	102	(0)
1980–1982	Arminia Bielefeld	67	(0)
1983–1993	Arminia Bielefeld	174	(2)
- * Club domestic league appearances and goals

Wolfgang Kneib (born 20 November 1952) is a German retired professional football played as a goalkeeper. He spent eight seasons in the Bundesliga with Borussia Mönchengladbach and Arminia Bielefeld. He scored two goals for Arminia from penalty kicks.

== Honours ==
- European Cup runner-up: 1976–77
- UEFA Cup: 1978–79; runner-up 1979–80
- Bundesliga: 1976–77
