= Bernd Nickel =

German footballer (1949–2021)

Personal information
- Full name: Bernd Nickel
- Date of birth: 15 March 1949
- Place of birth: Siegbach, Germany
- Date of death: 27 October 2021 (aged 72)
- Place of death: Siegbach, Germany
- Height: 1.70 m (5 ft 7 in)
- Positions: Attacking midfielder; striker

Youth career
- 1957–1966: SV Eisemroth
- 1966–1967: Eintracht Frankfurt

Senior career*
Years	Team	Apps	(Gls)
1967–1983	Eintracht Frankfurt	426	(141)
1983–1984	Young Boys	20	(9)
Total		446	(150)

International career
1974	West Germany	1	(0)
- * Club domestic league appearances and goals

Bernd Nickel (15 March 1949 – 27 October 2021) was a German professional footballer who played as an attacking midfielder or striker. Due to his straight shots his nickname was "Doktor Hammer".

Nickel began his career in 1957 at SV Eisemroth. In 1966 he was signed by Eintracht Frankfurt, where he scored 141 goals in 426 Bundesliga games. He won the DFB-Pokal in 1974, 1975 and 1981. His biggest success was the victory of the UEFA Cup in 1980. Frankfurt won against Borussia Mönchengladbach with 2–3 (away) and 1–0 (home) on aggregate due to the UEFA away goals' rule. Nickel stayed until 1983 at the Eintracht. He was notorious for his heavy distance shots and free kicks.

Nickel scored four Olympico goals (goals scored direct from a corner kick) from all four corners of Eintracht's Waldstadion.

At the end of his career he joined BSC Young Boys from Switzerland for the 1983–84 season.

Nickel was capped once for the DFB team. He also competed for West Germany at the 1972 Summer Olympics.

== Honours ==
=== Club ===
Eintracht Frankfurt

- DFB-Pokal: 1973–74, 1974–75, 1980–81
- UEFA Cup: 1979–80
