= Charly Körbel =

German footballer and manager

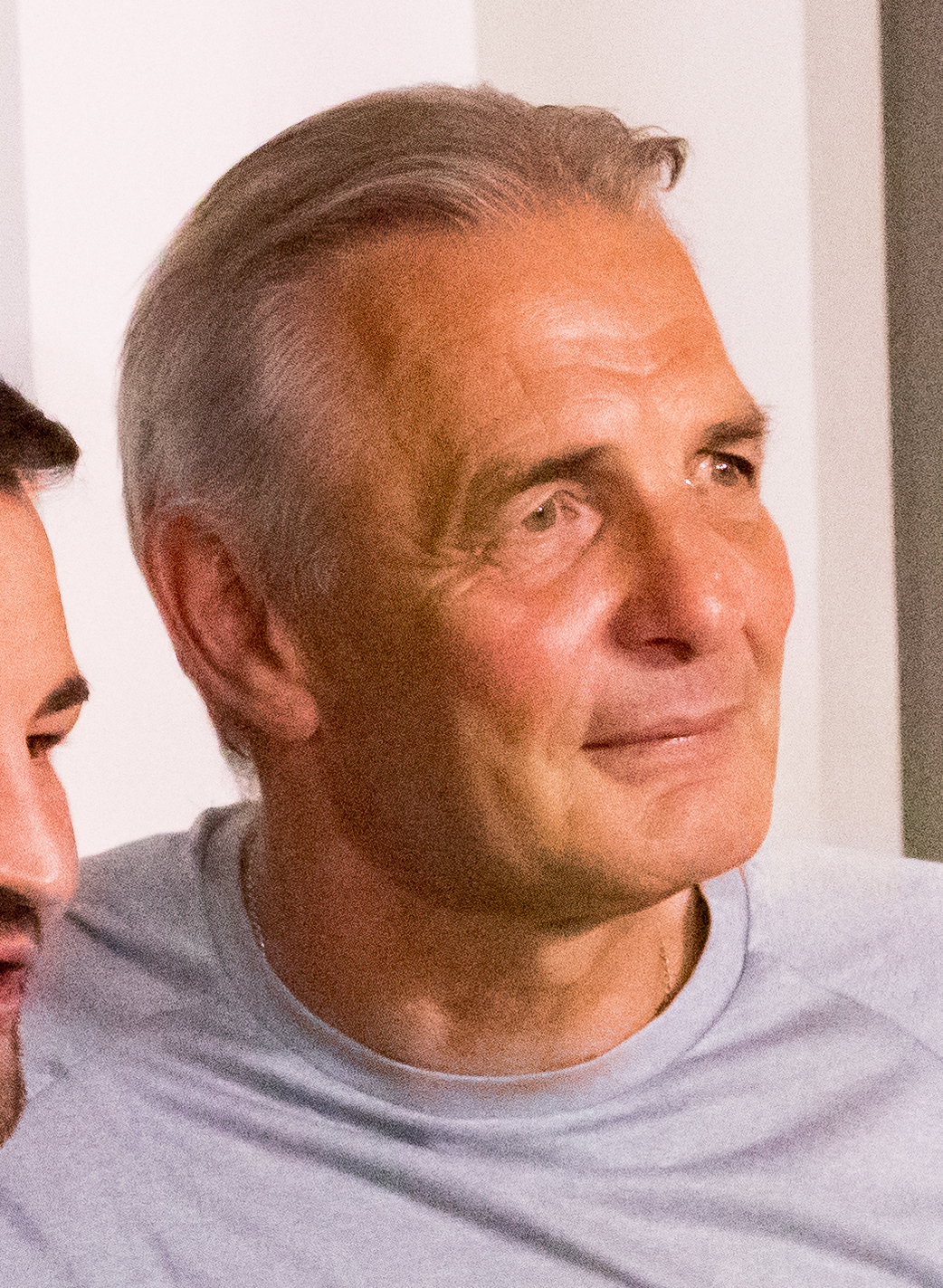
- Körbel in 2019

Personal information
- Full name: Karl-Heinz Körbel
- Date of birth: 1 December 1954 (age 71)
- Place of birth: Dossenheim, West Germany
- Height: 1.82 m (5 ft 11 1/2 in)
- Position: Defender

Team information
- Current team: Eintracht Frankfurt (youth academy)

Youth career
- 1962–1972: FC Dossenheim

Senior career*
Years	Team	Apps	(Gls)
1972–1991	Eintracht Frankfurt	602	(45)

International career
1974–1975	West Germany	6	(0)

Managerial career
- 1994: Eintracht Frankfurt (caretaker manager)
- 1995–1996: Eintracht Frankfurt
- 1996–1997: VfB Lübeck
- 1997–1998: FSV Zwickau
- * Club domestic league appearances and goals

Karl-Heinz "Charly" Körbel (born 1 December 1954) is a German former professional footballer who played as a defender. He is currently a member of Eintracht Frankfurt's directors of football and runs their football academy.

Körbel holds the record for the most Bundesliga appearances, having played 602 matches.

== Career ==
=== Playing career ===
Körbel is chiefly associated with spending his entire playing career at Eintracht Frankfurt from 1972 to 1991 having won four domestic cups and a European trophy. He currently holds the record for most Bundesliga appearances at 602. He gained six caps for West Germany and played in ten B internationals.

=== Coaching career ===
Nowadays, Körbel manages the Eintracht Football Academy and runs a sport shop in his hometown Dossenheim.

== Honours ==
Eintracht Frankfurt

- DFB-Pokal: 1973–74, 1974–75, 1980–81, 1987–88
- UEFA Cup: 1979–80
