= Norbert Nachtweih =

German footballer (born 1957)

Personal information
- Date of birth: 4 June 1957 (age 69)
- Place of birth: Sangerhausen, East Germany
- Height: 1.74 m (5 ft 9 in)
- Position: Midfielder

Youth career
- 1963–1967: Motor Sangerhausen
- 1967–1969: Traktor Polleben
- 1969–1971: MK Eisleben
- 1971–1974: Chemie Halle

Senior career*
Years	Team	Apps	(Gls)
1974–1976	Chemie Halle	35	(2)
1976–1982	Eintracht Frankfurt	120	(26)
1982–1989	Bayern Munich	202	(20)
1989–1991	Cannes	43	(2)
1991	Eintracht Frankfurt	3	(0)
1991–1995	Waldhof Mannheim	127	(11)
1997	SV Bernbach		
1998–1999	FC Schwalbach		

International career
- East Germany U21
- * Club domestic league appearances and goals

Norbert Nachtweih (born 4 June 1957) is a German former professional footballer who played as a midfielder.

He played in 325 Bundesliga games over the course of 13 seasons (46 goals), playing for Eintracht Frankfurt and Bayern Munich and winning eight major titles combined, including four national championships with the latter.

== Career ==
Born in Sangerhausen, East Germany, Nachtweih moved to West Germany in 1976, signing with Eintracht Frankfurt, for which he appeared as a midfielder over the course of five Bundesliga seasons, scoring 25 goals in his last three years combined and winning the 1979–80 UEFA Cup (11 appearances, one goal) against fellow league side Borussia Mönchengladbach.

In the 1982 summer, Nachtweih joined FC Bayern Munich, contributing with 85 games and ten goals as the Bavarians won three consecutive national championships from 1985 to 1987 (of the four he conquered with the team during his spell), and also being regularly played as a defender. In 1989, the 32-year-old moved to France and signed for AS Cannes, partnering a young Zinedine Zidane in two Ligue 1 seasons, and helping the club qualify to the UEFA Cup in his first.

After a brief spell with Eintracht, Nachtweih signed with second division's SV Waldhof Mannheim in December 1991. He retired from professional football after five seasons at the age of 39, but still competed a few years at the amateur level.

After his active career, Nachtweih managed SV Bernbach and FK Pirmasens (first as a youth coach). Subsequently, he returned to Eintracht Frankfurt, working in the club's football academy.

=== Defection ===
In October 1976, following an under-21 international game, Nachtweih fled to West Germany via Turkey alongside Jürgen Pahl, being suspended one year by FIFA. Even though he was one of the best German men's footballers in the 1980s, FIFA formalities forbade a career in the West German national team, as he had previously appeared with East Germany.

== Honours ==
Eintracht Frankfurt

- UEFA Cup: 1979–80
- DFB-Pokal: 1980–81

Bayern Munich

- Bundesliga: 1984–85, 1985–86, 1986–87, 1988–89
- DFB-Pokal: 1983–84, 1985–86; runner-up 1984–85
- European Cup: runner-up 1986–87
- DFL-Supercup: 1987

== See also ==
- List of Eastern Bloc defectors
