= 1980–81 DFB-Pokal =

Tournament details
- Country: West Germany
- Teams: 128

Final positions
- Champions: Eintracht Frankfurt
- Runners-up: 1. FC Kaiserslautern

Tournament statistics
- Matches played: 137

The 1980–81 DFB-Pokal was the 38th season of the annual German football cup competition. It began on 27 August 1980 and ended on 2 May 1981. In the final, FC Kaiserslautern was defeated by Eintracht Frankfurt (3–1) who were awarded the trophy for the third time. Despite losing in the quarter-finals, Hamburger SV set an all-time record by scoring 36 goals in the competition. Fortuna Düsseldorf set an all-time record of 18 consecutive cup-match victories since 1978, despite losing in the quarter-finals.

== Matches ==
=== First round ===
27 August 1980
FC Bayern Munich	2 – 0	Arminia Bielefeld
29 August 1980
VfB Stuttgart II	2 – 5	Borussia Dortmund	(AET)
Hannover 96	8 – 1	Borussia Hannover
MSV Duisburg	9 – 0	Wacker 04 Berlin
Concordia Hamburg	2 – 2	Hammer SpVgg	(AET)
Borussia Neunkirchen	1 – 1	SpVgg Bayreuth	(AET)
1. FC Viersen 05	2 – 2	Karlsruher SC	(AET)
30 August 1980
SV Darmstadt 98	10 – 0	FSV Hemmersdorf
FV 1913 Lauda	1 – 2	VfB Oldenburg	(AET)
RSV Würges	2 – 0	FC Ottering
FC Schalke 04	2 – 5	Bayer Uerdingen
Hamburger SV	11 – 1	VfR Wormatia Worms
VfB Stuttgart	4 – 0	Fortuna Köln
Borussia Mönchengladbach	7 – 3	OSV Hannover
VfB Gaggenau	0 – 3	Eintracht Frankfurt
SpVgg Emsdetten	0 – 6	1. FC Köln
Bramfelder SV	2 – 8	Bayer 04 Leverkusen
VfL Bochum	4 – 1	SV Wilhelmshaven
Eintracht Trier	0 – 1	Fortuna Düsseldorf
Hertha BSC	3 – 1	Holstein Kiel
SV Werder Bremen	6 – 3	Viktoria Köln	(AET)
Alemannia Aachen	3 – 0	VfB Eppingen
Rot-Weiß Essen	7 – 2	VfR Neuss
Blau-Weiß Niederembt	1 – 4	Preußen Münster	(AET)
FSV Frankfurt	3 – 1	SV Röchling Völklingen
SC Herford	3 – 0	Eintracht Nordhorn
Eintracht Braunschweig	4 – 1	SC Fürstenfeldbruck
SC Freiburg	4 – 2	Bremer SV
FC 08 Homburg	3 – 0	SG Limburgerhof
TuS Neuendorf	3 – 4	SG Egelsbach	(AET)
VfL Klafeld-Geisweid	1 – 2	Rot-Weiß Frankfurt
Rot-Weiß Niebüll	3 – 2	Eintracht Braunschweig II
Bünder SV	2 – 0	SV Südwest Ludwigshafen
TuS 08 Langerwehe	5 – 0	SV Stuttgart-Rot
SpVgg Ansbach 09	1 – 0	FSV Pfaffenhofen
TSV Gersthofen	0 – 1	OSC Bremerhaven
SG 05 Pirmasens	0 – 8	TSV 1860 München
TSV Plön	0 – 3	1. FC Saarbrücken
Arminia Hannover	2 – 1	SpVgg Erkenschwick
Moselfeuer Lehmen	1 – 15	Kickers Offenbach
Sportfreunde Eisbachtal	1 – 3	SG Wattenscheid 09
SV Buchonia Flieden	1 – 4	ESV Ingolstadt
VfB Bielefeld	1 – 3	VfB Friedrichshafen
VfR Heilbronn	0 – 3	1. FC Kaiserslautern
TSV Pliezhausen	0 – 3	SSV Ulm 1846
DSC Wanne-Eickel	1 – 3	SpVgg Frechen
Kickers Würzburg	2 – 1	TSV Hirschaid	(AET)
SV Waldhof Mannheim	8 – 0	FSV Harburg
FC Augsburg	2 – 0	Wuppertaler SV
SpVgg Fürth	1 – 1	1. FC Nürnberg	(AET)
1. FSV Mainz 05	3 – 2	MTV 1881 Ingolstadt
31 August 1980
Schwarz-Weiß Essen	6 – 0	FC Neureut
ASV Burglengenfeld	2 – 3	VfB Wissen
Rot-Weiß Oberhausen	1 – 0	FV Offenburg
TSV Röttenbach	2 – 4	KSV Hessen Kassel
Freiburger FC	3 – 1	VfB Bottrop
ASC Dudweiler	0 – 1	FV Würzburg 04
Blumenthaler SV 1919	0 – 2	SC Pfullendorf
SV Atlas Delmenhorst	6 – 2	Blau-Weiß Wesselburen
SV Siegburg 04	2 – 1	BFC Preußen Berlin
VfL Osnabrück	2 – 0	Tennis Borussia Berlin	(AET)
Stuttgarter Kickers	2 – 0	Rot-Weiß Lüdenscheid
VfR 1910 Bürstadt	4 – 1	SSV Dillenburg
TuS Celle	0 – 0	SG Union Solingen	(AET)

==== Replays ====
17 September 1980
SpVgg Bayreuth	2 – 1	Borussia Neunkirchen
24 September 1980
Hammer SpVgg	3 – 2	Concordia Hamburg
Karlsruher SC	2 – 1	1. FC Viersen 05
1. FC Nürnberg	3 – 0	SpVgg Fürth
SG Union Solingen	5 – 0	TuS Celle

=== Second round ===
Bayer 05 Uerdingen	4 – 1	SG Wattenscheid 09
Hannover 96	5 – 5	SV Werder Bremen
Eintracht Braunschweig	3 – 1	Preußen Münster
Hertha BSC Berlin	4 – 1	FV Würzburg 04
VfL Bochum	5 – 1	Rot-Weiss Essen
Kickers Offenbach	5 – 2	Bayer Leverkusen
Rot-Weiß Niebüll	0 – 4	Schwarz-Weiss Essen
SpVgg Bayreuth	1 – 3	VfB Stuttgart
Würzburger Kickers	0 – 2	Fortuna Düsseldorf
TuS 08 Langerwehe	1 – 7	Borussia Mönchengladbach
FC 08 Homburg	0 – 1	VfB Oldenburg
SV Darmstadt 98	4 – 1	VfR Bürstadt
SSV Ulm 1846	1 – 0	SC Herford
OSC Bremerhaven	0 – 2	RSV Würges
Bünder SV	3 – 1	SpVgg Frechen
Borussia Dortmund	3 – 1	TSV 1860 München
1. FC Köln	1 – 1	SC Freiburg
Borussia Dortmund	3 – 1	TSV 1860 München
FC Bayern Munich	4 – 2	SV Waldhof Mannheim
Karlsruher SC	1 – 1	Alemannia Aachen
Eintracht Frankfurt	6 – 0	VfB Friedrichshafen
Stuttgarter Kickers	13 – 0	SpVgg Ansbach 09
Union Solingen	1 – 2	Rot-Weiß Frankfurt
FC Augsburg	2 – 0	FSV Mainz 05
VfB Wissen	1 – 7	VfL Osnabrück
SC Pfullendorf	0 – 1	SV Siegburg 04
KSV Hessen Kassel	4 – 0	Hammer SpVgg
ESV Ingolstadt	1 – 3	1. FC Nürnberg
1. FC Saarbrücken	2 – 2	Freiburger FC
FSV Frankfurt	2 – 0	MSV Duisburg
Arminia Hannover	3 – 7	Hamburger SV
SG Egelsbach	1 – 3	1. FC Kaiserslautern
SV Atlas Delmenhorst	1 – 0	Rot-Weiß Oberhausen

==== Replays ====
28 October 1980
SV Werder Bremen	1 – 0	Hannover 96
Freiburger FC	3 – 1	1. FC Saarbrücken
Alemannia Aachen	1 – 0	Karlsruher SC
5 November 1980
SC Freiburg	3 – 1	1. FC Köln

=== Third round ===
22 November 1980
1. FC Kaiserslautern	2 – 1	FC Bayern Munich
VfB Stuttgart	2 – 0	1. FC Nürnberg
Fortuna Düsseldorf	3 – 0	Borussia Dortmund
Eintracht Frankfurt	3 – 0	SSV Ulm 1846
Schwarz-Weiß Essen	1 – 2	Bayer Uerdingen
Bünder SV	1 – 7	Borussia Mönchengladbach
Hamburger SV	11 – 1	Rot-Weiß Frankfurt
SC Freiburg	2 – 1	KSV Hessen Kassel	(AET)
Eintracht Braunschweig	3 – 2	Stuttgarter Kickers
Hertha BSC	4 – 1	SV Darmstadt 98
Alemannia Aachen	5 – 2	Freiburger FC
FC Augsburg	1 – 3	SV Werder Bremen
SV Siegburg 04	1 – 2	VfB Oldenburg	(AET)
RSV Würges	0 – 1	VfL Osnabrück
Kickers Offenbach	1 – 1	SV Atlas Delmenhorst
FSV Frankfurt	1 – 2	VfL Bochum

==== Replay ====
20 December 1980
SV Atlas Delmenhorst	2 – 1	Kickers Offenbach

=== Round of 16 ===
Hamburger SV	4 – 1	VfL Bochum
Fortuna Düsseldorf	2 – 0	SV Werder Bremen
VfL Osnabrück	1 – 3	VfB Stuttgart
VfB Oldenburg	4 – 5	Eintracht Frankfurt
Borussia Mönchengladbach	6 – 1	SV Atlas Delmenhorst
1. FC Kaiserslautern	3 – 0	Alemannia Aachen
Hertha BSC Berlin	5 – 1	Bayer Uerdingen
Eintracht Braunschweig	1 – 0	SC Freiburg

=== Quarter-finals ===
Eintracht Braunschweig	4 – 3	Hamburger SV	(AET)
Hertha BSC Berlin	2 – 1	Fortuna Düsseldorf
1. FC Kaiserslautern	3 – 1	Borussia Mönchengladbach
Eintracht Frankfurt	2 – 1	VfB Stuttgart

=== Semi-finals ===
Eintracht Frankfurt	1 – 0	Hertha BSC Berlin
1. FC Kaiserslautern	3 – 2	Eintracht Braunschweig

=== Final ===
2 May 1981
16:00 CEST

Eintracht Frankfurt	3–1	1. FC Kaiserslautern
Neuberger 38'; Borchers 40'; Cha 64'	Report	Geye 90'

Neckarstadion, Stuttgart
Attendance: 71,000
Referee: Horst Joos (Stuttgart)
