= List of Borussia Mönchengladbach players =

This is a list of notable footballers who have played for Borussia Mönchengladbach. Generally, this means players that have played a lot of matches for the club.

== List ==
As of 23 August 2026

Player	Position	Period	Appearances	Goals
(Germany) Willi Wicken	DF	1947–1961	183	46
(Germany) Willi Fischermann	MF	1949–1958	115	10
(Germany) Christian Dohnen	DF	1950–1958	119	0
(Germany) Heinz Janssen	FW	1952–1956	114	42
(Germany) Egmond Kablitz	MF	1952–1962	204	14
(Germany) Ewald Nienhaus	FW	1953–1957	115	46
(Germany) Hans Göbbels	MF	1954–1963	135	3
(Germany) Albert Brülls	ST	1955–1962	165	40
(Germany) Heinz de Lange	DF	1955–1966	166	1
(Germany) Lambert Pfeiffer	DF	1955–1963	120	4
(Germany) Gerd Schommen	MF	1955–1966	193	10
(Germany) Karl-Heinz Mülhausen	MF	1956–1964	180	52
(Germany) Friedel Schicks	MF	1956–1964	138	15
(Germany) Albert Jansen	DF	1957–1967	250	7
(Germany) Ulrich Kohn	ST	1959–1964	151	88
(Germany) Manfred Orzessek	GK	1961–1969	148	0
(Germany) Herbert Laumen	ST	1962–1971	275	141
(Germany) Heinz Lowin	MF	1962–1967	151	3
(Germany) Jupp Heynckes	ST	1963–1967, 1970–1978	417	298
(Germany) Egon Milder	DF	1963–1969	201	25
(Germany) Günter Netzer	MF	1963–1973	358	137
(Germany) Rudolf Pöggeler	DF	1963–1969	136	20
(Germany) Bernd Rupp	ST	1964–1967, 1972–1974	201	100
(Germany) Berti Vogts	DF	1965–1980	538	45
(Germany) Heinz Wittmann	DF	1965–1973	139	0
(Germany) Herbert Wimmer	MF	1966–1978	469	68
(Germany) Peter Dietrich	MF	1967–1971	113	14
(Germany) Hartwig Bleidick	DF	1968–1973	139	6
(Germany) Wolfgang Kleff	GK	1968–1979, 1980–1982	430	0
(Germany) Horst Köppel	MF	1968–1971, 1973–1979	219	51
(Germany) Winfried Schäfer	MF	1968–1970, 1977–1985	265	22
(Denmark) Ulrik le Fevre	ST	1969–1972	108	27
(Germany) Klaus-Dieter Sieloff	DF	1969–1974	162	20
(Germany) Rainer Bonhof	MF	1970–1978	329	63
(Germany) Dietmar Danner	MF	1971–1980	254	38
(Germany) Christian Kulik	MF	1971–1981	324	58
(Germany) Hans-Jürgen Wittkamp	DF	1971–1978	244	38
(Denmark) Henning Jensen	ST	1972–1976	182	60
(Germany) Hans Klinkhammer	DF	1972–1980	195	5
(Denmark) Allan Simonsen	ST	1972–1979	249	117
(Germany) Uli Stielike	MF	1972–1977	146	15
(Germany) Karl Del'Haye	ST	1974–1980	123	15
(Germany) Frank Schäffer	DF	1974–1983	295	8
(Germany) Wilfried Hannes	DF	1975–1986	326	72
(Germany) Norbert Ringels	DF	1975–1985	216	10
(Germany) Horst Wohlers	MF	1975–1979	132	9
(Denmark) Carsten Nielsen	MF	1976–1981	147	32
(Germany) Wolfgang Kneib	GK	1976–1980	153	0
(Germany) Ulrich Sude	GK	1976–1986	162	0
(Germany) Ewald Lienen	ST	1977–1981, 1983–1987	327	51
(Germany) Hans-Günter Bruns	DF	1978–1990	407	84
(Germany) Lothar Matthäus	MF	1979–1984	200	49
(Germany) Uwe Rahn	ST	1980–1988	286	112
(Germany) Uli Borowka	DF	1981–1987	192	13
(Germany) Hans-Jörg Criens	ST	1981–1993	346	116
(Germany) Frank Mill	ST	1981–1986	188	85
(Germany) Kurt Pinkall	ST	1981–1986	100	27
(Germany) Hans-Georg Dreßen	DF	1982–1989, 1990–1991	164	29
(Norway) Kai-Erik Herlovsen	MF	1982–1990	154	5
(Germany) Christian Hochstätter	MF	1982–1998	393	61
(Germany) Uwe Kamps	GK	1982–2004	518	0
(Germany) Michael Frontzeck	MF	1983–1989, 1995, 1999–2000	289	19
(Austria) Bernd Krauss	MF	1983–1990	202	13
(Germany) Thomas Eichin	DF	1985–1996	198	0
(Germany) André Winkhold	DF	1985–1990	152	3
(Germany) Stefan Effenberg	MF	1987–1990, 1994–1998	216	41
(Germany) Jörg Neun	MF	1988–1997	293	13
(Germany) Karlheinz Pflipsen	MF	1988–1999	220	43
(Germany) Michael Klinkert	DF	1989–2001	313	22
(Germany) Martin Max	ST	1989–1995	152	24
(Germany) Peter Wynhoff	MF	1989–1999	276	39
(Germany) Thomas Kastenmaier	DF	1990–1998	208	46
(Germany) Martin Schneider	MF	1990–1999	300	9
(Sweden) Martin Dahlin	ST	1991–1997	146	68
(Germany) Holger Fach	DF	1991–1995	118	17
(Denmark) Peter Nielsen	MF	1992–1997, 1999–2002	210	12
(Sweden) Patrik Andersson	DF	1993–1999	199	11
(Germany) Markus Hausweiler	MF	1995–2005	152	8
(Germany) Marcel Ketelaer	MF	1995–2000, 2002–2004	117	13
(Sweden) Jörgen Pettersson	ST	1996–1999	123	36
(Germany) Marcel Witeczek	DF	1997–2003	180	13
(Croatia) Slađan Ašanin	DF	1998–2004	162	14
(Slovakia) Igor Demo	MF	1999–2005	153	31
(Germany) Max Eberl	DF	1999–2005	146	0
(Germany) Bernd Korzynietz	DF	1999–2005	164	9
(Brazil) Marcelo Pletsch	DF	1999–2004	150	3
(Netherlands) Arie van Lent	ST	1999–2004	158	62
(Germany) Peer Kluge	MF	2001–2007	147	9
(Czech Republic) Ivo Ulich	MF	2001–2005	129	11
(Luxembourg) Jeff Strasser	DF	2002–2006	122	3
(Germany) Oliver Neuville	ST	2004–2010	161	42
(Belgium) Filip Daems	DF	2005–2015	232	16
(Germany) Tobias Levels	DF	2006–2012	119	1
(Netherlands) Roel Brouwers	DF	2007–2016	210	16
(Venezuela) Juan Arango	MF	2009–2014	175	31
(Brazil) Dante	DF	2009–2012	103	8
(Germany) Tony Jantschke	DF	2009–2024	302	5
(Germany) Thorben Marx	MF	2009–2015	113	4
(Germany) Marco Reus	MF	2009–2012	109	41
(Germany) Patrick Herrmann	MF	2010–2024	420	56
(Germany) Marc-André ter Stegen	GK	2010–2014	127	0
(Germany) Julian Korb	DF	2011–2017	101	3
(Norway) Havard Nordtveit	DF	2011–2016	187	12
(Austria) Martin Stranzl	DF	2011–2016	145	10
(Sweden) Oscar Wendt	DF	2011–2021	305	19
(Spain) Álvaro Domínguez	MF	2012–2016	106	3
(Switzerland) Granit Xhaka	MF	2012–2016	140	9
(Germany) Christoph Kramer	MF	2013–2015, 2016–2025	288	10
(Brazil) Raffael	ST	2013–2020	201	71
(Belgium) Thorgan Hazard	MF	2014–2019	182	46
(United States) Fabian Johnson	MF	2014–2020	140	15
(Switzerland) Yann Sommer	GK	2014–2023	335	0
(Guinea) Ibrahima Traoré	MF	2014–2021	132	11
(Switzerland) Nico Elvedi	DF	2015–2026	364	19
(Germany) Lars Stindl	MF	2015–2023	271	83
(Germany) Jonas Hofmann	MF	2016–2023	214	48
(Germany) Matthias Ginter	DF	2017–2022	179	11
(Germany) Florian Neuhaus	MF	2017–	238	26
(Switzerland) Denis Zakaria	MF	2017–2022	146	11
(France) Alassane Plea	ST	2018–2025	236	68
(Switzerland) Breel Embolo	ST	2019–2022	106	25
(Austria) Stefan Lainer	DF	2019–2025	163	5
(France) Marcus Thuram	ST	2019–2023	134	44
(Germany) Rocco Reitz	MF	2020–2026	103	8
(Germany) Luca Netz	DF	2021–2026	124	3
(United States) Joe Scally	DF	2021–	167	5

== Key ==
- GK: Goalkeeper
- DF: Defender
- MF: Midfielder
- ST: Striker
