= Wolf Werner =

German footballer and manager (1942–2018)

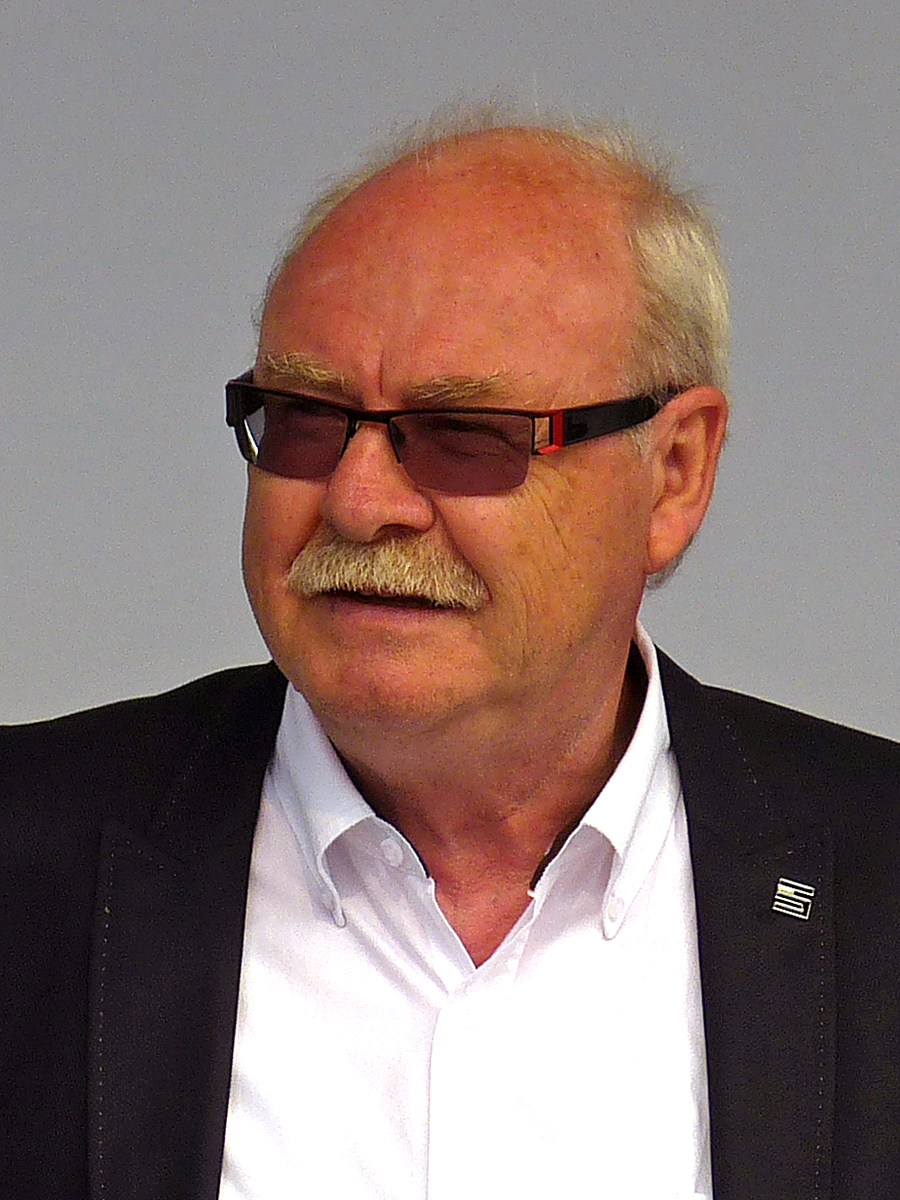
- Werner in 2013

Personal information
- Date of birth: 8 April 1942
- Place of birth: Kalisz, German-occupied Poland
- Date of death: 29 June 2018 (aged 76)
- Position: Midfielder

Senior career*
Years	Team	Apps	(Gls)
1956–1962	CfR Hardt		
1962–1969	TuRa Bremen		

Managerial career
- 1979–1987: Borussia Mönchengladbach (assistant)
- 1987–1989: Borussia Mönchengladbach
- 1991–1992: Bayern Munich II
- 1992–1996: SV Wilhelmshaven
- 2002: Werder Bremen II
- 2004: Werder Bremen (juniors)
- 2007: Fortuna Düsseldorf
- * Club domestic league appearances and goals

Wolf Werner (8 April 1942 – 29 June 2018) was a German footballer and coach who played as a midfielder. He was also manager at Fortuna Düsseldorf from 2007 to 2014.

== Career ==
=== Player ===
Werner was born in Kalisz, German-occupied Poland. He first played for CfR Hardt from 1956 to 1962 and was active in the amateur league for TuRa Bremen from 1962 to 1969. In the 1960s, he was a contract soldier with the Bundeswehr in Bremen-Burglesum.

=== Coach ===
Until 1979, Werner coached the amateur team VfB Komet Bremen. He worked as an assistant coach from 1979 to 1987. Among others at Borussia Mönchengladbach with Jupp Heynckes as head coach.

Werner managed Bundesliga club Borussia Mönchengladbach between 1987 and 1989. He was coach of SV Wilhelmshaven from 1992 and 1996. From 1996 to 2007, he worked for Werder Bremen as director of the youth academy and as a coach. During his tenure, the club's U19 won the German under 19 football championship in 1998–99 and came second in 1999–2000. From 2007, he was sporting director at Fortuna Düsseldorf, also working as interim coach. He resigned in 2014. Werner went down in club history because he was the first Borussia coach who had to leave before the end of his contract. In November 1989, he was released after a 1-0 defeat against Bayer 05 Uerdingen on matchday 17 and replaced by Gerd vom Bruch.

== Personal life ==
In the years before his death, Werner lived in Wilhelmshaven. He died on 29 June 2018, aged 76, on holiday in Kiel, Schleswig-Holstein, aged 76.
