= Borussia Mönchengladbach =

Association football club in Germany

- Full name: Borussia Verein für Leibesübungen 1900 e.V. Mönchengladbach
- Nicknames: Die Fohlen (The Foals); Die Borussen (The Prussians)
- Founded: 1 August 1900; 126 years ago (as FK Borussia 1900)
- Stadium: Borussia-Park
- Capacity: 54,057
- President: Rainer Bonhof
- Head coach: Alexander Blessin
- League: Bundesliga
- 2025–26: Bundesliga, 12th of 18
- Website: borussia.de
| Home colours | Away colours | Third colours |

Borussia Verein für Leibesübungen 1900 e.V. Mönchengladbach, better known as Borussia Mönchengladbach (German: [boˈʁʊsi̯a mœnçn̩ˈɡlatbax]) and colloquially known as just Gladbach, is a professional football club based in Mönchengladbach, North Rhine-Westphalia, Germany. The club plays in the Bundesliga, the top flight of German football. Nicknamed Die Fohlen [diː ˈfoːlən] (The Foals), the club has won five league titles, three DFB-Pokals and two UEFA Cup titles.

Borussia Mönchengladbach was founded in 1900, with its name derived from a Latinised form of Prussia, which was a popular name for German clubs in the former Kingdom of Prussia. The team joined the Bundesliga in 1965 and saw the majority of its success in the 1970s, where, under the guidance of Hennes Weisweiler and then Udo Lattek, a young squad with a fast, aggressive playing style was formed. During this period, Mönchengladbach won the Bundesliga five times, the UEFA Cup twice and reached a European Cup final in 1977.

Since 2004, Borussia Mönchengladbach have played at Borussia-Park, having previously played at the Bökelbergstadion since 1919. Based on membership, they are the fifth-largest club in Germany with over 75,000 members in 2016 and 93,000 as of 2021. The club's main rivals are 1. FC Köln, against whom they contest the Rhine derby. Their secondary rivals include Borussia Dortmund, Fortuna Düsseldorf and Bayer Leverkusen.

== History ==
=== 1899–1905: Formation ===
In November 1899, a group of discontented members left their sports association, TC Germania Gladbach (referred to as "Teutonia Gladbach" in some sources). On 17 November 1899, thirteen of these young men formed a new club, this time specifically focused on association football, in the Zum Jägerhof pub. They chose the word Borussia (Latin: "Prussia") as their association's new title, although this was not yet the club's official founding. Borussia was chosen because Mönchengladbach was located in the western provinces awarded to the Kingdom of Prussia as part of the 1815 Congress of Vienna. Other notable football clubs in western Germany that chose the name "Prussia" as their title include Borussia Dortmund in 1909 and SC Preußen Münster in 1906.

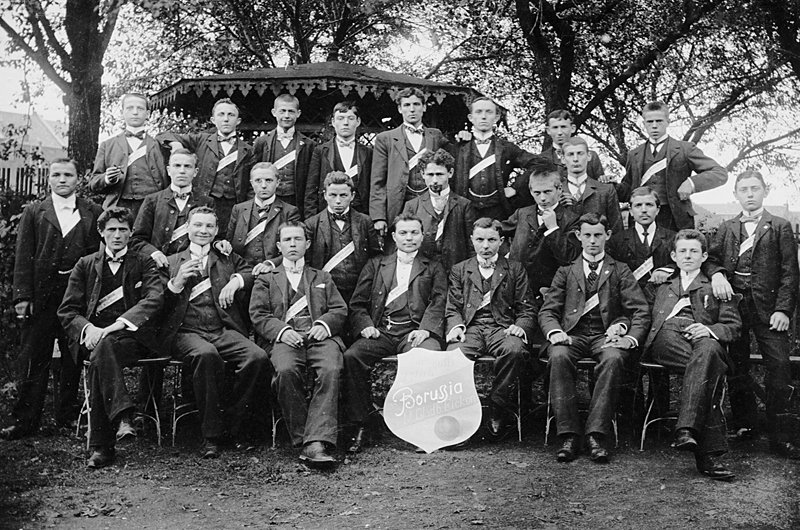
Players of FC Borussia in 1900

Borussia's early years were faced with the problems typical for association football teams in the German Empire: the sport, only recently imported from the UK in the 1880s, was not yet institutionally accepted, and as a result there were logistical shortages of football fields, goals, changing rooms, and player equipment. Borussia's players initially had to finance their own gear for what was at the time a considerable financial expenditure for working-class people.

Borussia was the second dedicated football club in the city of Mönchengladbach. FC Mönchengladbach, founded six years earlier in 1894, quickly became Borussia's first rival. Whereas FC Mönchengladbach was socially and financially established, young Borussia found it difficult to guarantee regular access to training grounds and equipment. As a result, the team joined the Marianische Jünglings-Kongregation Mönchengladbach Eicken (German: "Marian Youth Congregation Mönchengladbach Eicken"), a conservative Catholic sporting association. Within this larger organization, the footballers reformed into the Fussball Club Borussia 1900 on 1 August 1900, marking the club's official founding date.

From within the congregation, Borussia was able to more effectively organize official games against various opposing teams. The team scored 2–1 victories over both Blitz Neuwerk and Germania Mönchengladbach, and a 4–2 victory over Rheydt FC. As early as 1902, Borussia crossed international borders for the first time, losing 0–2 against Helmondia Helmond in the Netherlands, before playing the Dutch team to a 1–1 draw at home.

The appeal of both association football in general and Borussia in particular caused tensions with the conservative ideology of the Youth Congregation; the practice of football players wearing shorts instead of long trousers and the reality of football practice on Sundays hindering Church attendance created tension between Borussia and the Youth Congregation Eicken, and Borussia ultimately left the congregation on 24 May 1903.

To continue successful football competitions and to ease the organization of games, the club had applied to join the Rheinisch-Westfälischer Spielverband (German: "Rhenish-Westphalian Sports Federation") on 16 February 1903, and was accepted on 23 February. Borussia continued playing local and regional opponents like Britannia Düsseldorf and BV Solingen. They also continued to travel to the nearby Netherlands, drawing Eindhoven VV 1–1. Borussia received a 0–11 defeat against Borussia Cologne in October 1903 in the away fixture; the loss was repeated 1–4 at home in the return game.

Crest 1904–1919

In 1904, Borussia competed with several other local teams in the third class of the second district of the Rhenish-Westphalian Sports Federation. After Borussia's only competitor for the title, BV Solingen, skipped the 1905 fixture in Mönchengladbach, Borussia won the title without having to face their opponent. On 8 January 1905, Borussia additionally scored a respectable 1–0 win over its city rival FC Mönchengladbach, albeit against the third team, confirming an earlier 6–1 win over FC Mönchengladbach on 26 December 1904. After having won the district cup, Borussia competed for the third class federation cup against, among others, teams from Essen and Cologne, ultimately losing the title to Kölner FC 99.

=== 1905–1914: Before the First World War ===
After some decent athletic success in the year 1905 (18 games, 12 wins, 1 draw, 5 losses), Borussia nonetheless faced frustration, as the playing grounds were judged insufficient for competition play. The team was subsequently excluded from major competitions until a more appropriate locale could be found.

Ultimately, Borussia acquired a patch of land on Reyerhütterstraße in Mönchengladbach to enable organized play, at a time when the growing spread of football made it more and more of a hassle in terms of property damage and noise pollution. By achieving access to its own football grounds, Borussia thus evaded the growing number of police actions that were launched to call football enthusiasts to order. Regular play continued, after more than a year of absence, in the second class of the second district, against teams like FC Mönchengladbach II, FC Eintracht Mönchengladbach and various teams from Düsseldorf and Krefeld, among others. After a 2–0 against Rheydt and two victories over Düsseldorf teams (4–1 against Britannia Düsseldorf, 4–1 against Union Düsseldorf), the first home game was held in Reyerhütterstraße against Preußen Krefeld. Borussia won the game with two goals difference.

At the end of the competition, Borussia was district champion, with eight wins in eight games (although Borussia had lost a 0–2 game against FC Mönchengladbach II that was subsequently annulled when FC Mönchengladbach II was disqualified from the competition), with 25 goals scored and only 8 conceded. But Borussia was skipped for promotion regardless; the club was once again assigned to the second class (now called B-Klasse) as a result of a league reform.

In 1907, Borussia left Reyerhütterstraße, where a new factory was under construction, and reached a deal with Gladbacher Turnverein 1848 to cooperatively run a ground near the Schweizerhaus, a famous gastronomy in the vicinity of the Kaiser-Friedrich-Halle. Games at the new grounds go well, with a 5–1 win over Borussia Köln, which had inflicted a painful 0–11 loss on Borussia in 1903, as well as a 5–3 against Rheydt. The season as a whole was mediocre for Borussia, ending with five wins, four losses and a draw at 19 goals scored and 13 conceded in third place. Borussia qualified for a promotion tournament to determine the team to be promoted to A class, but lost 0–6 to Viktoria Mönchengladbach.

The 1908–09 season was better for Borussia. After a 0–2 loss at home against FC Eintracht Mönchengladbach, Borussia regained its footing, beating Viktoria Mönchengladbach 4–1 in an away game and drawing them 2–2 at home. On 13 January 1909, Borussia scored an overwhelming 13–1 victory over Spiel und Sport Essen. Losing no game but the opener against Eintracht, Gladbach easily came first in the league, thus qualifying from Group South to face the promotion candidates from Group North, FC Cleve 06. After a resounding 5–1 win at home, the enthusiasm was dampened by a 3–4 setback in the away fixture. In the tiebreaker game, Borussia won 4–1, at last gaining promotion to the first division.

Going into the 1909–10 season, Borussia exchanged its previous black and white colour scheme with blue and yellow vertical stripes. Gladbach started into the higher league with significant issues, bringing Rheydt SpV only to a 2–2 at home before struggling with a crushing defeat in the 0–9 away fixture. The team ended the season with five wins, five losses and two draws in fourth place, avoiding relegation. The club's tenth anniversary had seen a record 143 registered members, up from 32 in 1906 and 75 in 1908.

In the 1910–11 season, the league grew from seven to ten teams, adding opponents like Germania Hilden, FC Krefeld and Eintracht Mönchengladbach, bringing the game plan for Borussia to 18 games, not counting numerous friendly matches that brought the total number of games played to over 30, placing a significant strain on the amateur players. Aside from a noteworthy 11–2 victory over rivals Rheydt SV, the season was another mediocre performance for Borussia. The season forced Borussia to once again move the playing ground, after the Schweizerhaus grounds were deemed to dangerous in response to complaints by opposing teams. Borussia subsequently moved to grounds near the Catholic graveyard, and finished fourth in the league. The new grounds were known as Stadion am Rosengarten.

The 1911–12 season was the first major success in the club's history. Borussia easily dominated the league with twelve wins, one draw and one loss, and thus earned qualification for promotion games towards Verbandsliga as northern district champions as well as the West German championship. Borussia defeated VfJuB Düren, the southern district champions, in a 4–2 game, before achieving a 5–0 blowout against VfB 1900 Gießen, the Hessian champions. Ultimately, Borussia lost the finals for the West German championship against Cologne BC 01, the precursor of Borussia's greatest all-time rival, 1. FC Köln, at a 2–4 scoreline.

In a step down from the previous season's outstanding performance, Borussia proved to struggle in the 1912–13 season. While the team was not threatened by relegation at any point in the tournament, Borussia ended in the middle of the table without a serious claim towards the title, and was no serious threat in the West German championship either. Borussia ended the season in sixth place in the league, at eight wins, two draws and eight losses.

In the last full season before the First World War, the German footballing structure was again reformed in the 1913–14 season. The system of two federation leagues (German: Verbandsliga) of twenty clubs each was replaced with a system of four district leagues (German: Kreisliga) of ten clubs each. This left Borussia in the Rhenish Northern District (German: Rheinischer Nordkreis) along with teams from Aachen and Düsseldorf, as well as other teams from Mönchengladbach. In the preparation for the season, Borussia performed miserably, losing 1–3 to Viktoria Duisburg and 1–6 to Duisburg SV. Borussia, nonetheless, entered the season with a clear goal to earn the district championship. The team fell well short of that target, coming third in the league at five wins, five draws and four losses. The highlight of the season was a friendly match against an English professional team. Dulwich Hamlet, which Borussia's amateur footballers lost 2–5 (initially having led 2–1 by the 80th minute before conceding four goals in the last ten minutes).

=== 1914–1918: First World War ===
In March 1914, the club purchased De Kull, a decommissioned gravel pit and the grounds on which the later Bökelbergstadion would be built. The First World War halted the progress of both the stadium and football in general, as many players volunteered or were drafted for military service. With rapidly changing player lineups, Borussia contested the war cup (German: Kriegspokal), beating Düren 7–0. In total, Borussia played 18 games in the 1914–15 season, in spite of the logistical difficulties caused by the war.

In time for the 1915–16 season, it had become clear that the war, initially anticipated by all sides to conclude quickly, would last longer than expected. Regardless, Borussia was able to assemble a functional team for the season (reinforced regularly by players on vacation from frontline duty), and played games against Union Krefeld, Viktoria Rheydt, Konstantia Kaldenkirchen, VfB Krefeld, FC Mönchengladbach and Eintracht Mönchengladbach. After a shaky start, including a 1–4 friendly game loss to Borussia Düsseldorf, Borussia found its footing in the league, and briefly rivalled Krefeld for the first place in January 1916. Ultimately, Borussia finished second in the league. By mid-1916, Borussia was forced to cease regular play due to the lack of regularly available players. By 4 November 1916, even the provisional club leadership had to cease operations, as too many of its members were called up for military service.

Borussia suffered several losses due to war casualties: The club's chairman since 1912, Heinz Körstgens, was killed in action in 1915, as was Stephan Ditgens, Borussia player and uncle of Borussia's first ever Germany national team player, Heinz Ditgens.

=== 1918–1933: During the Weimar Republic ===
In the immediate aftermath of the military armistice of 11 November 1918, football clubs all over Germany began to gradually resume operations. Members of Borussia had informal meetings about the resumption of play even during the last months of the war, as early as mid-1918. The first recorded game of this phase was a 5–0 over Rheydt SV on 15 August 1918, followed by the turnaround in the form of a 2–7 thrashing at the hands of Rheydt SV in the return fixture a week later. The aftermath of the war interrupted the blossoming football of 1918–19, as only seven of Borussia's 14 planned games were held due to the occupation of the region by the Belgian Armed Forces.

The decades-long struggle to find a usable locale to play continued, as De Kull was not yet ready to be used. By early 1919, the team returned to Schweizerhaus as a temporary measure. On 15 March 1919, FC Borussia merged with another local club, Turnverein Germania 1889, becoming 1889 VfTuR M.Gladbach. The club achieved its first major success in 1920, defeating Kölner BC 3–1 to win the 1920–1921 West German championship final.

The union between Germania and Borussia only lasted a matter of two years; the club was thereafter known as Borussia VfL 1900 e.V. M.Gladbach.

=== 1933–1945: Football under the Third Reich ===
Following the rise of the Nazi Party to power in 1933, the German league system was reformed to consist of 16 Gauligen – Gladbach found themselves playing first in the Gauliga Niederrhein, and later in various Bezirksklassen (district leagues). Also while under the Third Reich, Mönchengladbach's first ever international player was capped; Heinz Ditgens playing in a 9–0 win over Luxembourg for Germany in the 1936 Olympic Games.

=== 1945–1959: Rebuild after War ===
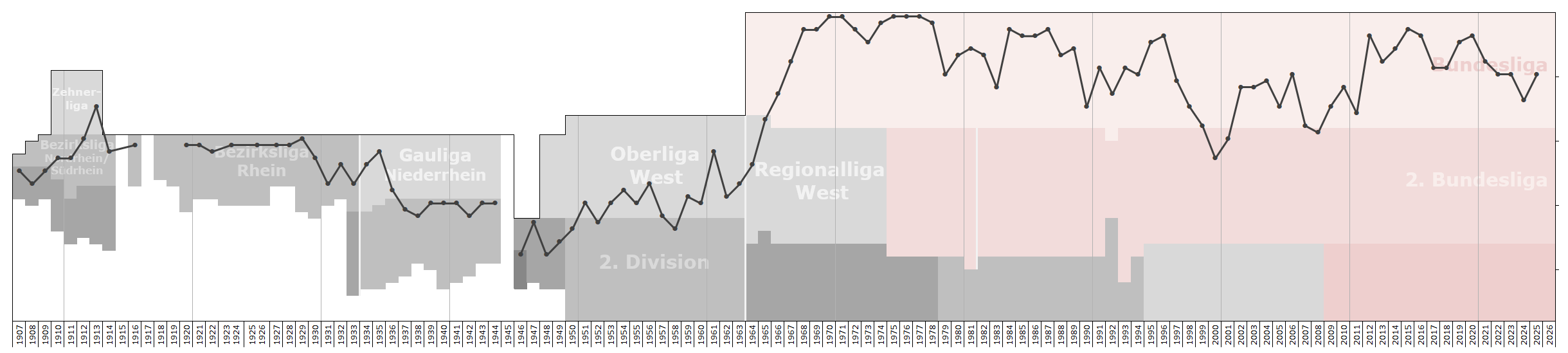
Historical chart of Borussia Mönchengladbach league performance

Eventually, Mönchengladbach resumed play in June 1946, gaining successive promotions to the Landesliga Niederrhein (the regional second tier) in 1949 and the top flight, the Oberliga West, in 1950. Following many years of promotions and relegations, Borussia won their first Oberliga title, in the 1958–59 season.

=== 1959–1965: Promotion to the Bundesliga ===
Seasons 1959–60 – 1964–65
| Season | Position | Goals For | Goals Against | Points | Average attendance |
|---|---|---|---|---|---|
| Oberliga West 1959–60 | 14 | 27 | 33 | 38 | 16,134 |
| Oberliga West 1960–61 | 6 | 31 | 29 | 58 | 22,400 |
| Oberliga West 1961–62 | 13 | 21 | 39 | 42 | 13,543 |
| Oberliga West 1962–63 | 11 | 24 | 36 | 44 | 11,200 |
| Regionalliga West 1963–64 | 8 | 41 | 35 | 71 | 12,000 |
| Regionalliga West 1964–65 | 1 | 52 | 16 | 92 | 22,334 |
gold: promotion to the Bundesliga as Champions

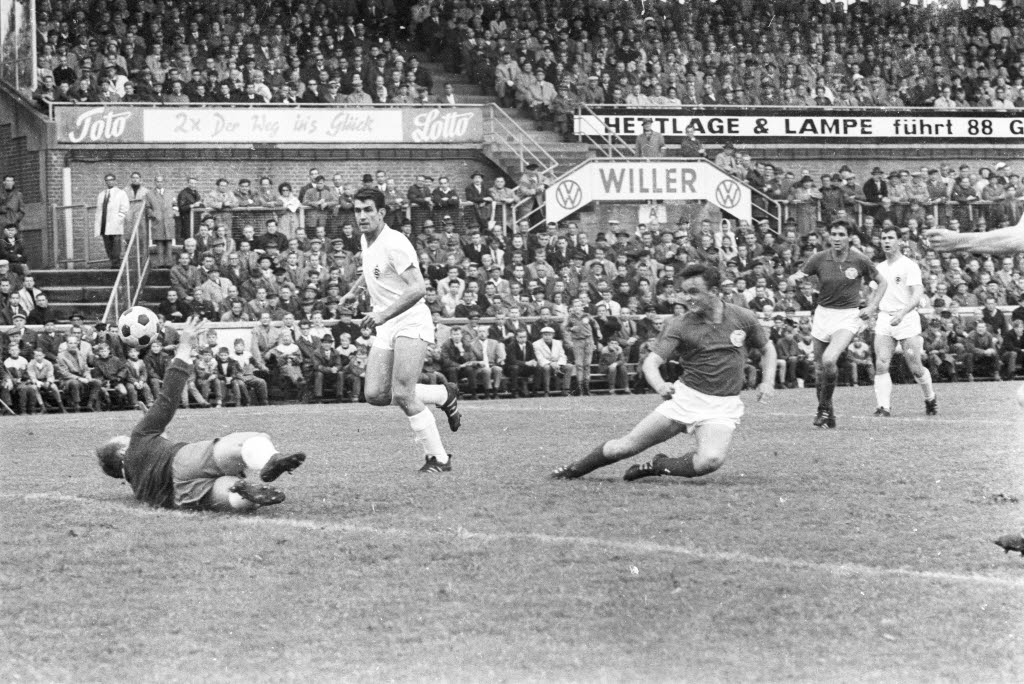
Promotion game at Holstein Kiel, 19 June 1965

In August 1960, Borussia Mönchengladbach defeated 1. FC Köln in the West German Cup. Weeks later, the club won the DFB-Pokal, a first national honour, after defeating Karlsruher SC 3–2 in the final. Borussia therefore qualified for the European Cup Winners' Cup in 1960–61, where they were defeated 11–0 on aggregate by the Scottish club, Rangers. Rangers won 3–0 in Germany and 8–0 in Glasgow.

The following year, the club took on the now-familiar name Borussia VfL Mönchengladbach after the city of München-Gladbach became Mönchengladbach.

The 1961–62 season in the Oberliga ended again with Borussia in 13th place in the table. In 1962–63, the club hoped in vain to join the circle of DFB clubs which would start the following year in the newly founded Bundesliga. Helmut Beyer, who remained in office for 30 years, took over the responsibility of president that season and Helmut Grashoff took over as second chairman. In July 1962, Borussia signed Fritz Langner, who had won the West German championship in 1959 with Westfalia Herne, as their new coach. To Langner's chagrin, the new leadership sold Albert Brüllsfor a record fee of 250,000 DM to FC Modena in Italy in order to rehabilitate the club financially. Helmut Grashoff, who collected the fee in Italian lira in cash in a suitcase, later said he had feared, after the money transfer, "being thought a bank robber". The proceeds from the transfer enabled Langner to rebuild the squad with the signing of players like Heinz Lowin, Heinz Crawatzo and Siegfried Burkhardt. That year, the A-Youth team won the West German championship with a squad that included future professional footballers, Jupp Heynckes and Herbert Laumen.

Further honours would have to wait a decade. Borussia's results in the ten years leading up to the formation of the Bundesliga in 1963 were not strong enough to earn them admission into the ranks of the nation's new top flight professional league, and so the club played in the second tier, the Regionalliga West.

In the next season, 1964–65, the club signed the youngsters, Jupp Heynckes and Bernd Rupp, and some of the youth team joined the professional squad. Their average age of 21.5 years was the lowest of all regional league teams. They earned the nickname "foals" due to their low average age as well as their carefree and successful play. Reporter Wilhelm August Hurtmanns coined the nickname in his articles in the Rheinische Post. He was taken with the style of Borussia and wrote that they would play like young foals. By April 1965, the team had won the Regionalliga West and thus secured the participation in the Bundesliga promotion round in Group 1. This saw the team play against the competitors of Wormatia Worms (Second in the Regionalliga Südwest), SSV Reutlingen (Second in the Regionalliga Süd) and Holstein Kiel (Champions in the Regionalliga Nord) in first and second matches. Of the six games Borussia won three (5–1 in Worms, 1–0 against Kiel and 7–0 against Reutlingen). The achievement of the first place made promotion to the Bundesliga safe. Together with Borussia Bayern Munich rose by winning Group 2.

Mönchengladbach enjoyed its first taste of the Bundesliga in the 1965–66 season, earning promotion alongside future powerhouse Bayern Munich. The two clubs went on to engage in a fierce struggle, as they challenged each other for domestic supremacy throughout the 1970s. Bayern took first blood in the struggle for supremacy between the two: winning the Bundesliga championship in 1969. Mönchengladbach struck back immediately in the next season with a championship of their own and followed up with a second title in 1971, becoming the first Bundesliga club ever to successfully defend their title.

=== 1965–1969: Early years in Bundesliga and struggles ===
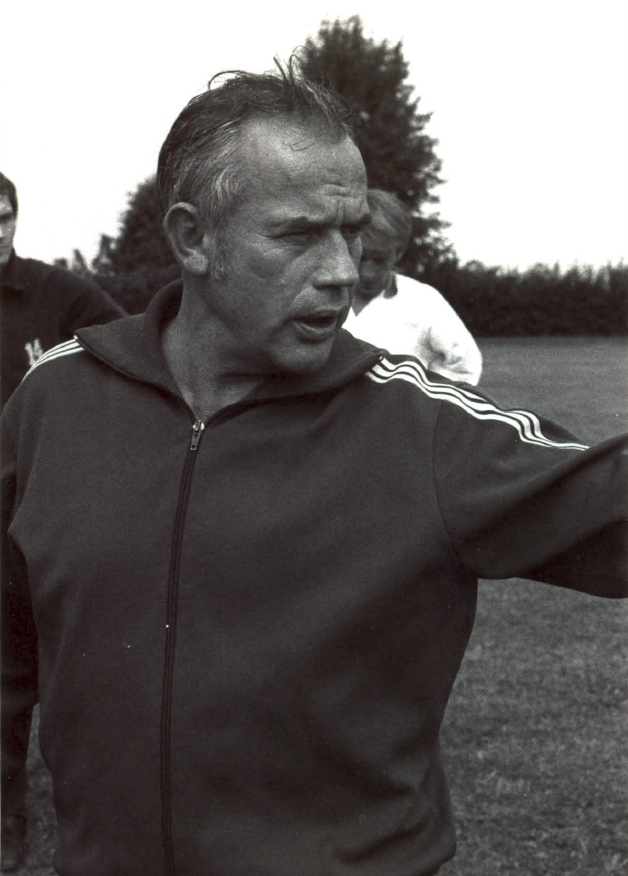
Hennes Weisweiler coached the club from 1964 to 1975.

The commitment of Weisweiler as coach pointed the way for the sporting success of the club in the Bundesliga. The economic situation of the club did not allow to finance a team of stars. Weisweiler corresponded to the needs of the association with his attitude to promote the education and development of young talents. He pressed Players not in a fixed game system, but promoted individualism and gave them considerable freedom on the field. This resulted in a carefree and offensive style of playing, the hallmark of Fohlenelf.

The club signed with Berti Vogts and Heinz Wittmann, both players whose names should be closely linked to the sporting successes of Borussia.

The first Bundesliga match in the 1965–66 season took place away against Borussia Neunkirchen and ended 1–1, the first Bundesliga goal scorer was Gerhard Elfert. The first home game against SC Tasmania 1900 Berlin Borussia won 5–0. Weisweiler knew how to give the team tactical freedom and to promote the individual enthusiasm of the players. These freedoms cost the still immature team in the first Bundesliga season with a number of sometimes high defeats. The Borussia finished the first season in the Bundesliga on the 13th place in the table.

In the following season 1966–67 showed the scoring power of the Mönchengladbacher team, which scored 70 goals. The striker Herbert Laumen scored 18, Bernd Rupp 16 and Jupp Heynckes scored 14 goals. Due to the good goal difference, the team was able to complete the season on the eighth place in the table. With an 11–0 home win over FC Schalke 04 on Matchday 18, the team celebrated the first highest ever victory in Bundesliga history.

The successes had the side effect that the salaries of the players jumped up and thus good players were not easy to hold onto. Jupp Heynckes moved for the former record transfer fee of 275,000 DM to Hannover 96, Bernd Rupp moved to SV Werder Bremen, and Eintracht Braunschweig signed Gerhard Elfert. The club bought Peter Meyer and Peter Dietrich and thus compensated for the departure of seasoned players. With a 10–0 win on the twelfth match-day of the season 1967–68 over Borussia Neunkirchen, the team showed again their scoring power. The team reached in this and the next season third place in the table. The club signed in the season 1968–69 their future coach Horst Köppel, who had already had first experiences in the national team, and from hitherto unknown amateur VfL Schwerte the then long-time goalkeeper Wolfgang Kleff and Hartwig Bleidick, Gerd Zimmermann and Winfried Schäfer, who played ten seasons at Borussia.

=== 1970–1980: Golden decade; dominance in the league and successes in Europe ===
Seasons 1969–70 – 1979–80
| Season | Position | Goals For | Goals Against | Points | Average attendance |
|---|---|---|---|---|---|
| 1969–70 | First | 71 | 29 | 51 | 25,645 |
| 1970–71 | First | 77 | 35 | 50 | 21,706 |
| 1971–72 | Third | 82 | 40 | 43 | 16,294 |
| 1972–73 | Fifth | 82 | 61 | 39 | 14,912 |
| 1973–74 | Second | 93 | 52 | 48 | 22,265 |
| 1974–75 | First | 86 | 40 | 50 | 22,150 |
| 1975–76 | First | 66 | 37 | 45 | 23,647 |
| 1976–77 | First | 58 | 34 | 44 | 25,135 |
| 1977–78 | Second | 86 | 44 | 48 | 26,059 |
| 1978–79 | Tenth | 50 | 53 | 32 | 20,129 |
| 1979–80 | Seventh | 61 | 60 | 36 | 17,655 |
in green: winning the Bundesliga

The 1970s went down as the most successful in the club's history.

Club crest 1970–1999

Under coach Hennes Weisweiler, the young side adopted an offensive style of play that attracted attention from fans from across Germany. During this period, Borussia won the championship five times, more than any other club in that era. At the same time, a rivalry developed with FC Bayern Munich, as both clubs were promoted to the Bundesliga in 1965.

After the club had twice finished third in previous years, Hennes Weisweiler in the 1969–70 season coached especially the defence. Deviating from the "foal" concept, Borussia bought for the first time experienced defensive players like Luggi Müller and Klaus-Dieter Sieloff. With Ulrik le Fevre the club signed their first Danish player, later followed by Henning Jensen and Allan Simonsen. This season saw the first Bundesliga victory over Bayern. After a 5–1 win over Alemannia Aachen on 31 October 1969, Borussia topped the Bundesliga for the first time. Today (as of December 2018) Borussia takes third place in the list of league leaders in the Bundesliga behind Bayern and Dortmund.

On 30 April 1970, with a home win against Hamburger SV in the 33rd Round of the season, Borussia were named as champions.

On 16 September 1970, Herbert Laumen scored the first goal for Borussia in European club football in the 6–0 win against EPA Larnaca. The first round of the following season 1970–71 saw only one defeat for the club. In the history of the Bundesliga unique is an incident in the home game of the 27th matchday against Werder Bremen, known as the post break from Bökelberg. In the game on 3 April 1971, after a penalty area scene in the 88th minute, the striker Herbert Laumen overturned the left goal post after a head clash with the Bremen goalkeeper Günter Bernardinto. After unsuccessful attempts of repair, as no replacement goal could be set up, the referee stopped the game at the score of 1–1. The DFB sports court in Frankfurt rated the game as a 2–0 win for Bremen. As a consequence, the DFB obliged the clubs to provide a replacement for both goals. The championship was decided only on the last match day as a head-to-head race with Bayern Munich. Nine weeks after the post-break game, on 5 June 1971, Borussia were the first side in the history of the Bundesliga to defend their championship title, with a victory at Eintracht Frankfurt.

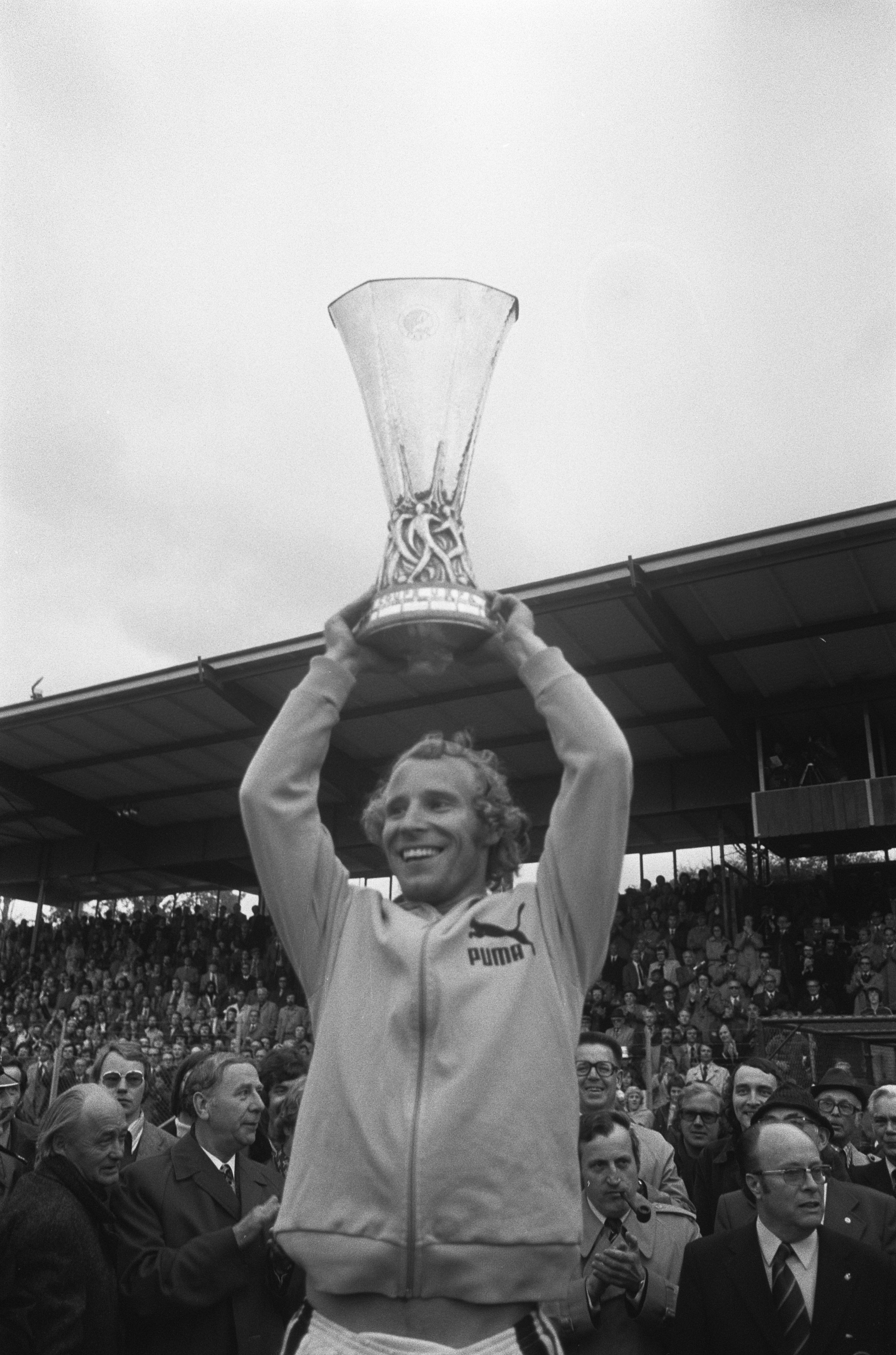
Berti Vogts with the UEFA Cup, 1975

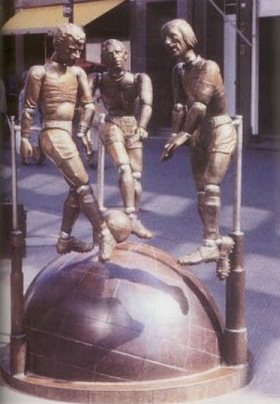
Monument to the trio of foals – Herbert Wimmer, Berti Vogts and Günter Netzer (from left to right), situated in the pedestrian area of Mönchengladbach-Eicken

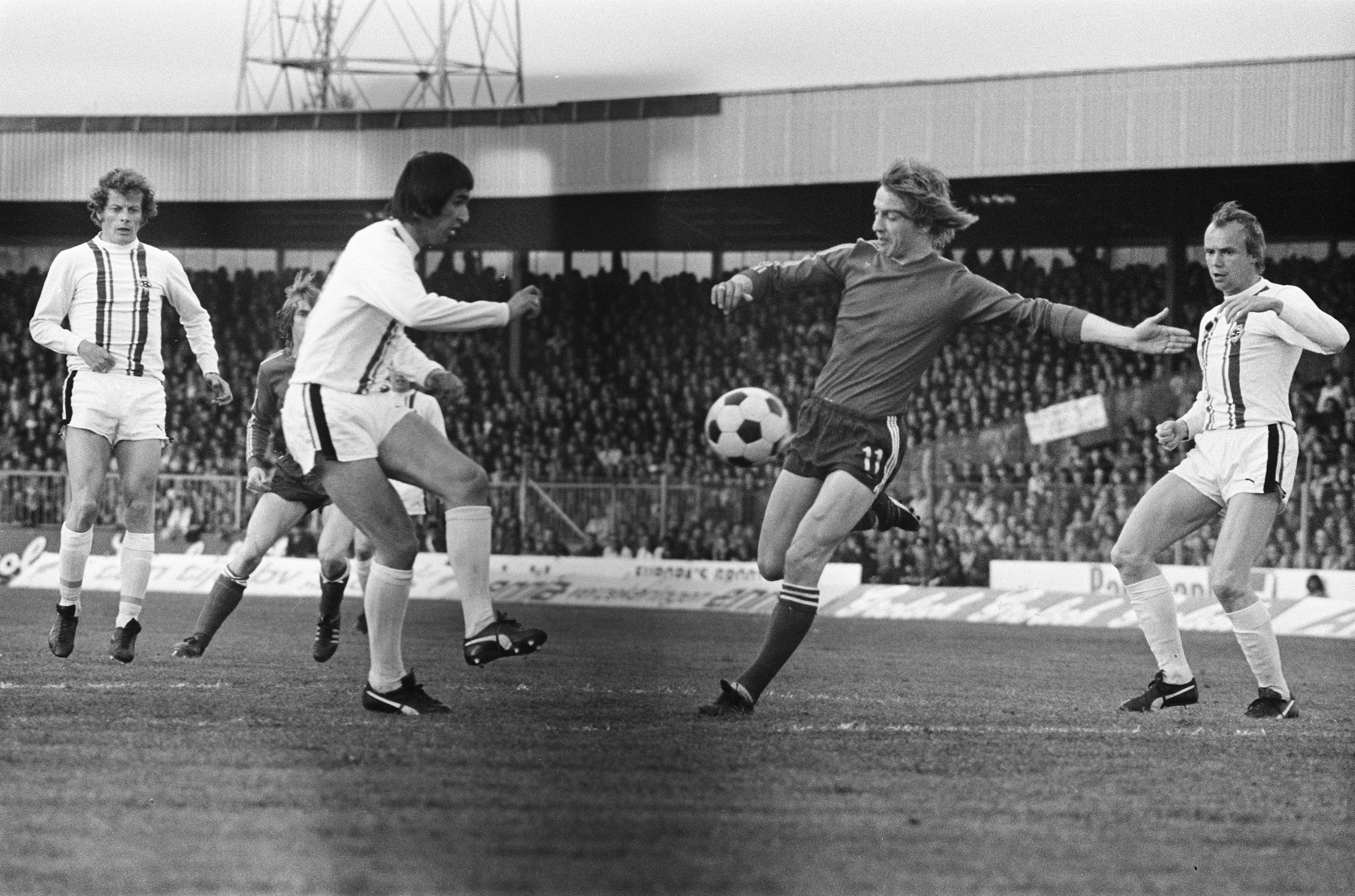
Game scene from the final of the UEFA Cup 1975, with FC Twente

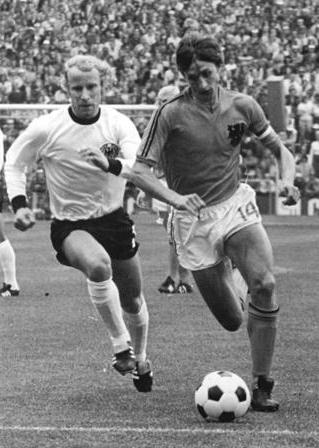
Berti Vogts in a running duel with Johan Cruyff in the World Cup final of 1974

On 20 October 1971, in the European Cup, the champions took part in a can-throwing game in football history match against Inter Milan instead. Borussia won the match at Bökelbergstadion 7–1, but UEFA cancelled the game, as the Italian striker Roberto Boninsegna was hit by an empty coke can and received medical treatment. Coaching legend Matt Busby described the game of the colts:

Nobody in the world would have won against this team today. That was football in the highest perfection.

After a 4–2 away defeat in Milan and a goalless draw in the replay at the Berlin Olympic Stadium, Borussia were eliminated from the Cup of the national champions.

Die Fohlen won 2–1 against 1. FC Köln in the Rheinland derby by a goal by Günter Netzer in 1973 to win their second DFB-Pokal. For Netzer this was the last game for Borussia: he left the club and moved to Real Madrid.

In addition to the game-winning scene in the 93rd minute from Netzer, there were numerous other highlights in this match.

The first international final match took place on 9 May 1973. Liverpool won the UEFA Cup first-leg 3–0 on the second try after the game was cancelled the day before due to rain. On 23 May 1973, Borussia Mönchengladbach won the second-leg 2–0, but Liverpool won the cup by aggregate victory.

The following seasons were marked by the departure of well-known players, although the main Mönchengladbach striker remained. In the 1973–74 season, Jupp Heynckes's 30 goals made him the top-scorer in the Bundesliga, the first Borussia Monchengladbach player to be so. In that first season following the departure of Günter Netzer, Borussia finished as runner-up to champions Bayern Munich by one point. With a total of 93 goals scored Borussia set a new club record. Borussia graduated in the following years 1972 to 1974, the championship in third and fifth place and vice-champion.

In the 1974–75 season, Borussia laid the foundation for a feat previously unheard of in the Bundesliga. On Matchday 17, the "foals" topped the league table and did not relinquish the league lead until winning the championship on 14 June 1975. The joy over the title was clouded by the departure of coach Hennes Weisweiler, who left the club after eleven years in the direction of Barcelona. The next international final with Mönchengladbach participation took place on 7 May 1975. The first leg of the UEFA Cup in Düsseldorf between Borussia and Twente ended goalless. The second leg on 21 May 1975 was won by the VfL 5: 1. With the highest away win in a UEFA Cup final, Borussia won their first international title.

Udo Lattek, who came from the rival Bayern Munich, although he had already signed with Rot-Weiss Essen, took over the club in the 1975–76 season. In contrast to the departed Weisweiler, Lattek represented a rather safety-first philosophy. The team topped the Championship on the twelfth round of the season, with a victory over Werder Bremen and Eintracht Braunschweig, and retained that lead to the end of the season.

On 3 March 1976, on Ash Wednesday, was the next international appearance of Borussia. In the European Champions Cup, Borussia Mönchengladbach played against Real Madrid, where now Günter Netzer and Paul Breitner were under contract, 2:2. In the second leg (17 March 1976), which ended 1–1, the referee Leonardus van der Kroft did not recognise two Mönchengladbach goals, in the 68th minute a goal by Henning Jensen and in the 83rd minute by Hans-Jürgen Wittkamp. Once a foul must have preceded the goal, once the referee decided on offside, although it had been not indicated by the linesman. The draw was enough for the Madrilenians to progress.

The team won three consecutive titles from 1975 to 1977. On 12 June 1976, Mönchengladbach won a fourth league title.

In the 1976–77 season, Lattek went with an almost unchanged team at the start. As Wolfgang Kleff was injured, the club signed a new goalkeeper. In Wolfgang Kneib, who came from SV Wiesbaden, Lattek found a safe substitute. Borussia needed one point to defend the title on the final day. The match took place away against Bayern Munich, then sixth in the table, and ended 2:2 by an own goal in the 90th minute by Hans-Jürgen Wittkamp. Borussia made the hat-trick and won on 21 May 1977 for the third consecutive time and for the fifth time overall the German championship title. The Dane Allan Simonsen received after this season the award as Europe's Footballer of the Year with the Ballon d'Or.

The team narrowly missed a fourth consecutive championship title in season 1977–78: Monchengladbach lost out to 1. FC Köln only by a worse goal difference. Borussia won against Borussia Dortmund 12–0 on the final day of the season, still the highest victory in the history of the Bundesliga. However, the Domstädter won their last game 5:0 at FC St. Pauli: they had a better goal difference by three goals and so won the championship. For the first time in the Bundesliga first and second were tied after the end of the season. Borussia would have been able to decide the championship in their favour had they won the match against 1. FC Cologne a few weeks earlier. However, the game ended in a draw, with Cologne player Heinz Flohe netting a vital 83rd-minute equaliser.

Although Mönchengladbach lost the 1977 final of the European Cup to Liverpool in Rome (25 May 1977), they also made four appearances in the UEFA Cup, with wins in 1975 and 1979 against losses in 1973 and 1980. The club's run had come to an end with eight trophies to their credit, and although they would continue to be competitive for many years, success would be much harder to come by.

In the following season 1978–79 Udo Lattek managed Borussia for the last time. Many regulars left the club, such as the later vice-president Rainer Bonhof, or announced their career end, such as Jupp Heynckes and Berti Vogts. Lattek did not succeed in offsetting these departures with appropriate new signings. On Matchday 30, the team was in 15th place with a goal-difference of 38:47 goals: three wins from the last four games improved the finish to tenth place. It was the first season in a long time in which the club finished with a negative goal difference. Borussia signed Jupp Heynckes to be assistant coach to Lattek this season. The second international title started on 9 May 1979. The first leg in the UEFA Cup against Red Star Belgrade ended in a draw. In the second leg on 23 May 1979, Borussia won 1–0 at home to win the UEFA Cup for the second time.

After the departure of Lattek in the 1979–80 season, the club appointed Jupp Heynckes head coach. The season was marked by two new entries. The club signed Harald Nickel of Eintracht Braunschweig. With a transfer fee of 1.15 million DM this was the hitherto most expensive new purchase. From Herzogenaurach came Lothar Matthäus. Borussia finished the season in seventh place. On 7 May 1980, Borussia Mönchengladbach was again in a final for the UEFA Cup. At home, the team won against Eintracht Frankfurt 3–2. In the second leg on 21 May 1980, Eintracht Frankfurt won 1–0 against Borussia Mönchengladbach and secured the trophy due to the larger number of away goals scored.

=== 1980–1996: Slowdown ===
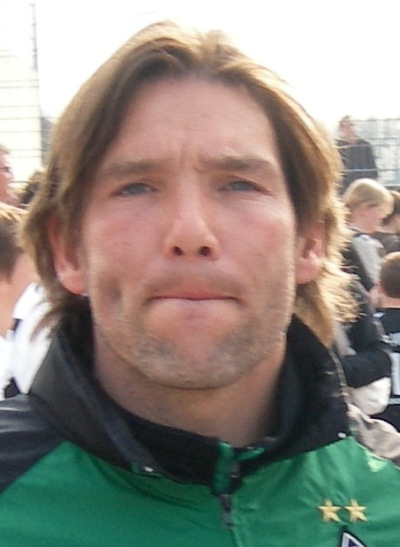
Uwe Kamps

In the 1980s, Borussia Moenchengladbach could no longer build on the titles they accumulated in the past decade and fell behind Bayern Munich. Due to the lack of ticket revenue from the small Bökelbergstadion, the club had to sell top performers repeatedly. Nevertheless, it was possible to settle frequently in the upper third of the Bundesliga and play in the championship fight. In the 1980–81 season, many long-time players left the club, including Karl Del'Haye, the first player signed by Bayern with hostile intent. Borussia committed with Wolfram Wuttke only to striking players. They replaced Wolfgang Kleff in goal to Uli Sude. The team reached this season's sixth place in the table. The sporting record did not improve in the following two seasons. With a seventh-place finish in 1982, Borussia missed participation in European competitions. The following year, Uwe Kamps guarded the goal for the first time, eventually becoming a key player.

In the 1983–84 season, Borussia contested the title. With Bernd Krauss, Michael Frontzeck and Uli Borowka, Borussia committed players who played for a long time successfully for the club. In the end, they landed tied behind VfB Stuttgart and Hamburger SV in third place. It was the first time in the history of the Bundesliga that three clubs tied the table on the last matchday. In the same season, Mönchengladbach also lost the DFB-Pokal final to Bayern Munich on penalties, Lothar Matthäus and Norbert Ringels both missing from the spot after the game originally ended all square at 1–1. Matthäus subsequently joined Bayern for a then-record fee of 2.25 million DM, leading some fans to question whether he had deliberately missed his penalty.

In the 1984–85 season, Borussia won 10–0 on Matchday 8 against Eintracht Braunschweig, which is so far the last two-digit victory in Bundesliga history. In the semi-finals of the German Cup VfL met again at Bayern Munich. After no goals had been scored in the regular season in Munich's Olympiastadion, Søren Lerby converted a penalty kick against Borussia goalkeeper Ulrich Sude in the 101st minute. This remained the only goal of the evening, so that Borussia missed the entry into the final.

The season 1985–86 brought no sporting highlights in the Bundesliga, with the club finishing fourth. Borussia Mönchengladbach gave away a 5–1 win over Real Madrid on 27 November 1985 in Düsseldorf (11 December 1985), when the club lost 4–0 in Madrid and dropped out of the UEFA Cup.

In the 1986–87 season, there was once again a coaching change. Jupp Heynckes announced his move to Bayern Munich. The club nominated Wolf Werner as the new coach. At the end of the season, Borussia stood with the third place in the table for the last time in this decade at a UEFA Cup place. The Association of German Sports Journalists voted Uwe Rahn Player of the Year. Again Borussia reached the semi-finals of the DFB Cup. But also this time Borussia lost against the later DFB Cup winner Hamburger SV. On 22 April 1987, Borussia lost against the Scottish representative Dundee United after defeat at home in Bökelberg in the UEFA Cup semi-final. It was also the first defeat in a European Cup game on the Bökelberg. After the departure of Jupp Heynckes, the era of long-standing engagements of head coaches ended. In the first 23 years from 1964 to 1987, Borussia only had three instructors; Since the departure of Heynckes, Borussia had committed 16 new coaches until 2008, with the exception of interim solutions. It was Werner's release on 21 November 1989 that saw first premature dismissal of a coach at Borussia at all. Only three later coaches managed to succeed in Mönchengladbach for more than three years, Bernd Krauss (1992–1996), Hans Meyer (1999–2003) and Lucien Favre (2011–2015).

In the next season, Borussia signed Stefan Effenberg, a player who worked long and successfully for the club. Borussia finished the season in seventh place and thus missed the participation in international competitions. The early 1990s followed a significant downward trend. As a result of the sporting decline, the number of spectators at the Bökelberg was declining for the first time. Already in the 1989–90 season, the club had fought against relegation. In the following years, Borussia placed in the midfield of the league. In the 1991–92 season, Borussia played again a good cup season. In the Cup semi-final, goalkeeper Uwe Kamps saved all four penalties against Bayer Leverkusen, and Borussia reached the final. The final on 23 May 1992 saw the Mönchengladbachers lose against the club from second division Hannover 96 3–4 on penalties.

In 1993, the club signed the players Heiko Herrlich and Patrik Andersson, and in 1994, Stefan Effenberg came back, who played for Borussia Mönchengladbach from 1987 to 1990. Under coach Bernd Krauss, they managed a renewed connection to the Bundesliga top end. In the 1994–95 season came the first trophy for Borussia since 1979, where they won the DFB-Pokal with a 3–0 victory over VfL Wolfsburg. Borussia would also win the Supercup against the German champions Borussia Dortmund a few months later.

=== 1996–2010: Firm decline and new stadium ===
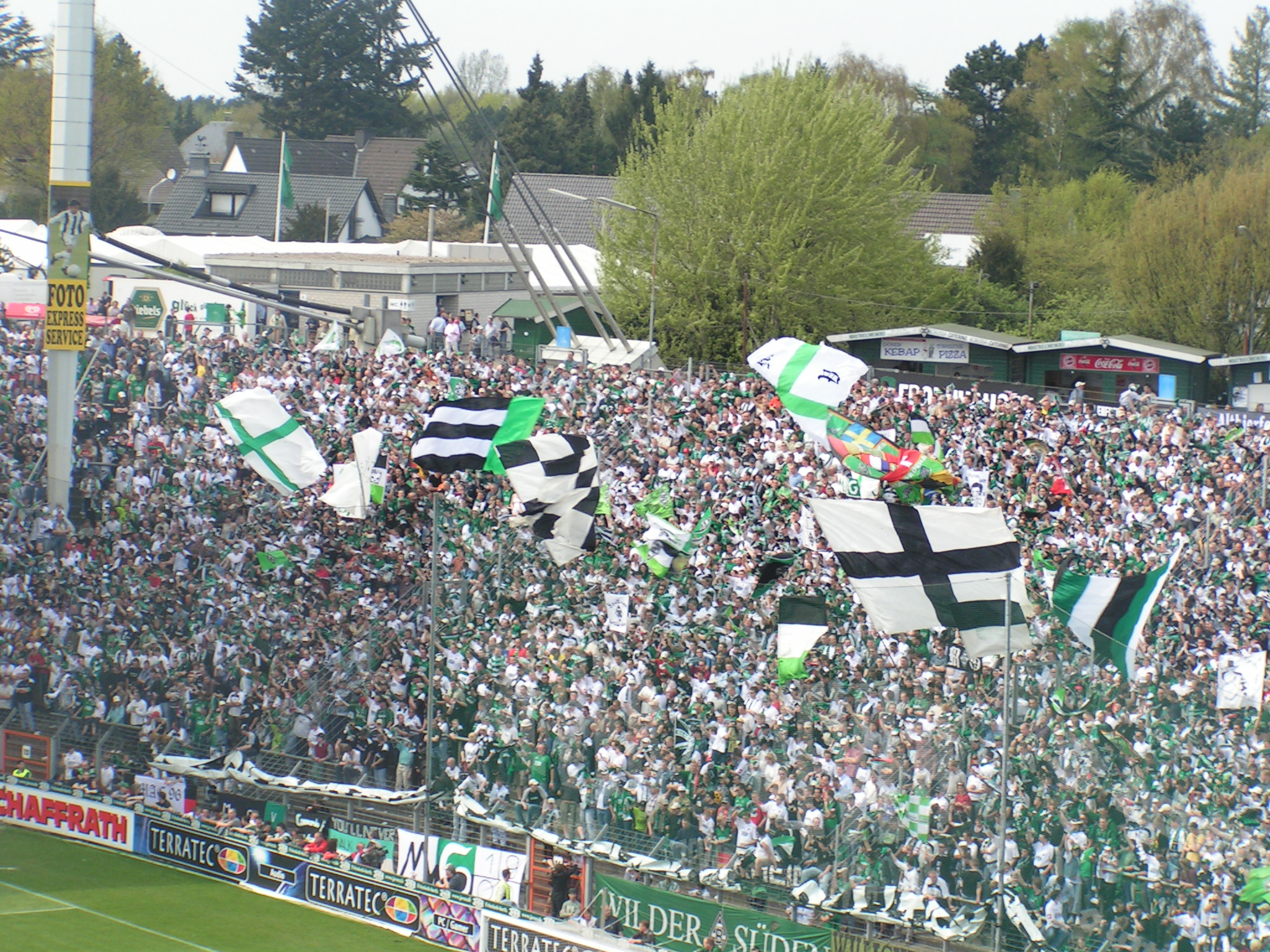
The northern curve in Bökelbergstadion

The team's performance slipped in the 1990s and Die Fohlen soon found themselves struggling in the lower half of the Bundesliga table.

After the first round of the 1996–97 season, Borussia finished 17th place in the table. The club dismissed coach Krauss due to the sporting failure. At the end of the season, the Mönchengladbacher were in eleventh place. None of the other four coaches who followed Krauss remained in office for more than a year. Under Friedel Rausch, Borussia could only remain in the Bundesliga after a dramatic season finale in 1998. Before the last matchday, the Borussia were three points above the relegation zone. On the final day of the season, they managed a 2–0 away win at VfL Wolfsburg; Karlsruher SC lost to Hansa Rostock and went down due to the worse goal difference.

In the international arena, the season was disappointing despite two victories in the first round of the UEFA Cup against Arsenal. Borussia lost in the second round of the first leg 2–4 against Monaco, the most recent victory Borussia reached with a 1–0 in Monaco, but were eliminated from the competition. In the 1998–99 season, Borussia won 3–0 against Schalke 04 on Matchday 1 and was at the top of the table for the first time in 13 years. As a result, the team suffered six losses and two draws, resulting them to stand on the ninth day at the bottom of the table. On the tenth and eleventh round followed by a 2:8 defeat against Bayer Leverkusen and a 1:7 at VfL Wolfsburg, two consecutive heavy defeats. The team remained until the end of the season in 18th place. After a total of 21 lost games, the consequence was the first relegation from the Bundesliga. As a consequence of the relegation, several top performers, including goalkeeper Robert Enke, defender Patrik Andersson, and midfielder Karlheinz Pflipsen and Sebastian Deisler all left the club.

Finally, in 1999, Gladbach were relegated to 2. Bundesliga, where they would spend two seasons. Upon returning to the Bundesliga in 2001, Mönchengladbach continued to be in the bottom half of the league.

The first season in the 2. Bundesliga started the same way as the previous one ended. In the DFB Cup, the team were knocked out early after a lost penalty shootout against the regional league SC Verl. The second division season 1999–2000 ended the Borussia despite a bad first round still in fifth place in the table. Four points were missing for direct promotion.

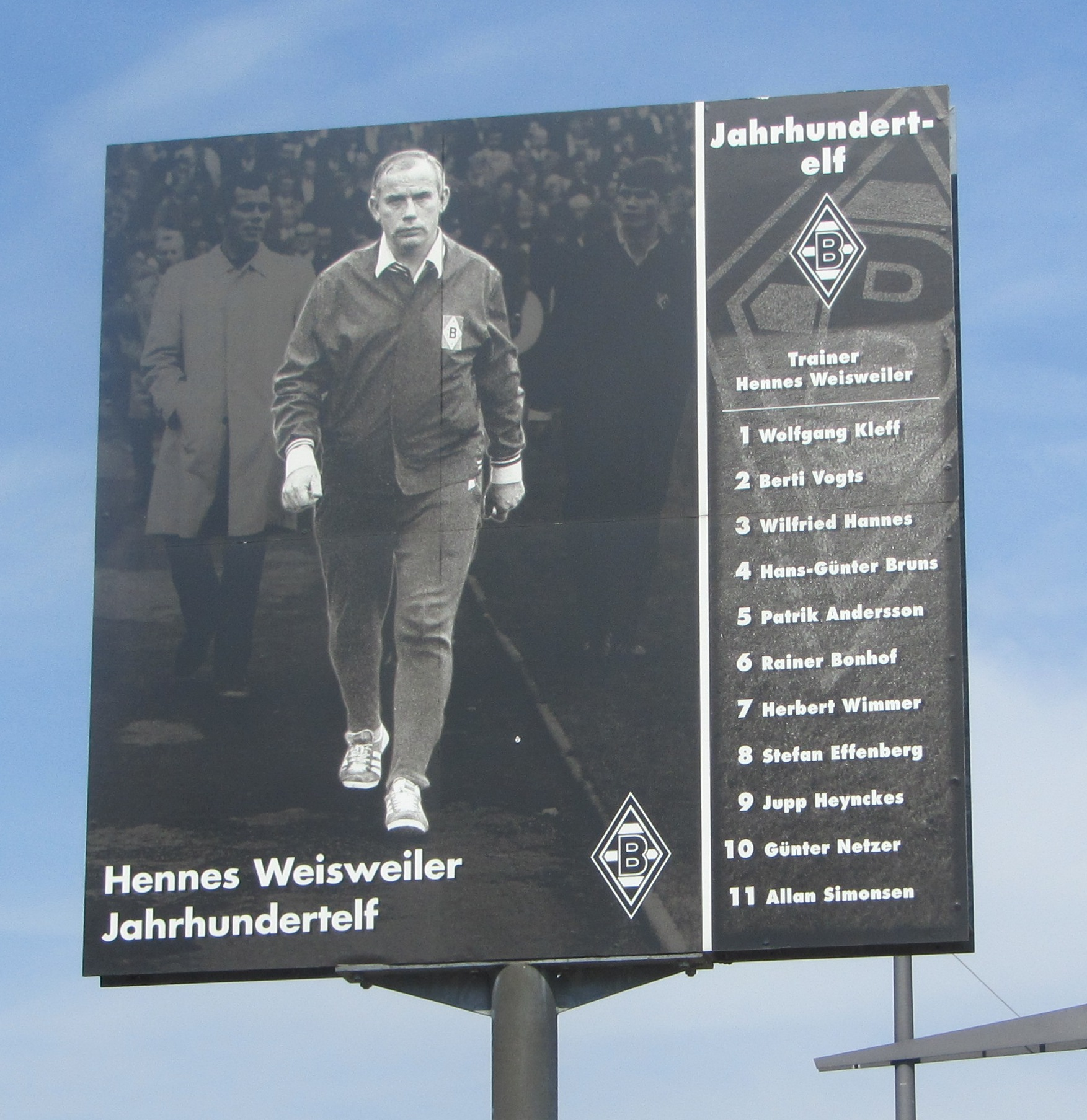
Blackboard at Borussia Park with Hennes Weisweiler and the names of the players of the "Team of the Century"

On 1 August 2000, Borussia Mönchengladbach celebrated the 100-year anniversary of the club. As part of the celebrations, next to coach Hennes Weisweiler the following players were elected by Borussia supporters in the so-called century Elf: As goalkeeper Wolfgang Kleff, in defence Berti Vogts, Hans-Günter Bruns, Wilfried Hannes and Patrik Andersson, in midfield Rainer Bonhof, Stefan Effenberg, Herbert Wimmer, and Günter Netzer, and in attack Jupp Heynckes and Allan Simonsen. Later, large-format posters with images of the players on the north and east sides were attached to the steel exterior of the stadium in Borussia Park.

In the 2000–01 season, the team was able to celebrate as a runner-up in the Bundesliga 2 re-emergence in the Bundesliga and reached the semi-finals of the DFB Cup, but were knocked out as in the previous year against a Regionalligisten (Union Berlin) on penalties. Borussia won first place in the national fair play ranking in 2002 in the draw for a place in the UEFA Cup, but the lot was not drawn. Also in the season 2003–04 Borussia missed participation in the UEFA Cup. On 17 March 2004, the Borussia were eliminated by a 0–1 defeat against the then second division Alemannia Aachen in the semi-finals of the DFB Cup. A victory against the Alemannia would have been enough, because the final opponent Werder Bremen was already qualified for the UEFA Champions League due to the table position. The season was under the motto Bye Bye Bökelberg, because on 22 May 2004, the last Bundesliga match took place in Bökelbergstadion. The Borussia defeated 1860 Munich 3:1; the last goal on Bökelberg was headed by Arie van Lent. Uwe Kamps came on in the 82nd minute and came to his 457th match in the Bundesliga.

In 2004, Mönchengladbach appointed Dick Advocaat, who had guided the Netherlands national team to the semi-finals of UEFA Euro 2004 and was a successful manager at Rangers, as their new coach. However, Advocaat was unable to have much success and resigned in April of the following year. Former Mönchengladbach player and German international Horst Köppel was appointed caretaker for the remaining five fixtures of the season. Köppel had managed the club's reserves since leaving Borussia Dortmund in June 2004. For the 2006–07 season, former Mönchengladbach player and coach Jupp Heynckes was appointed as team coach.

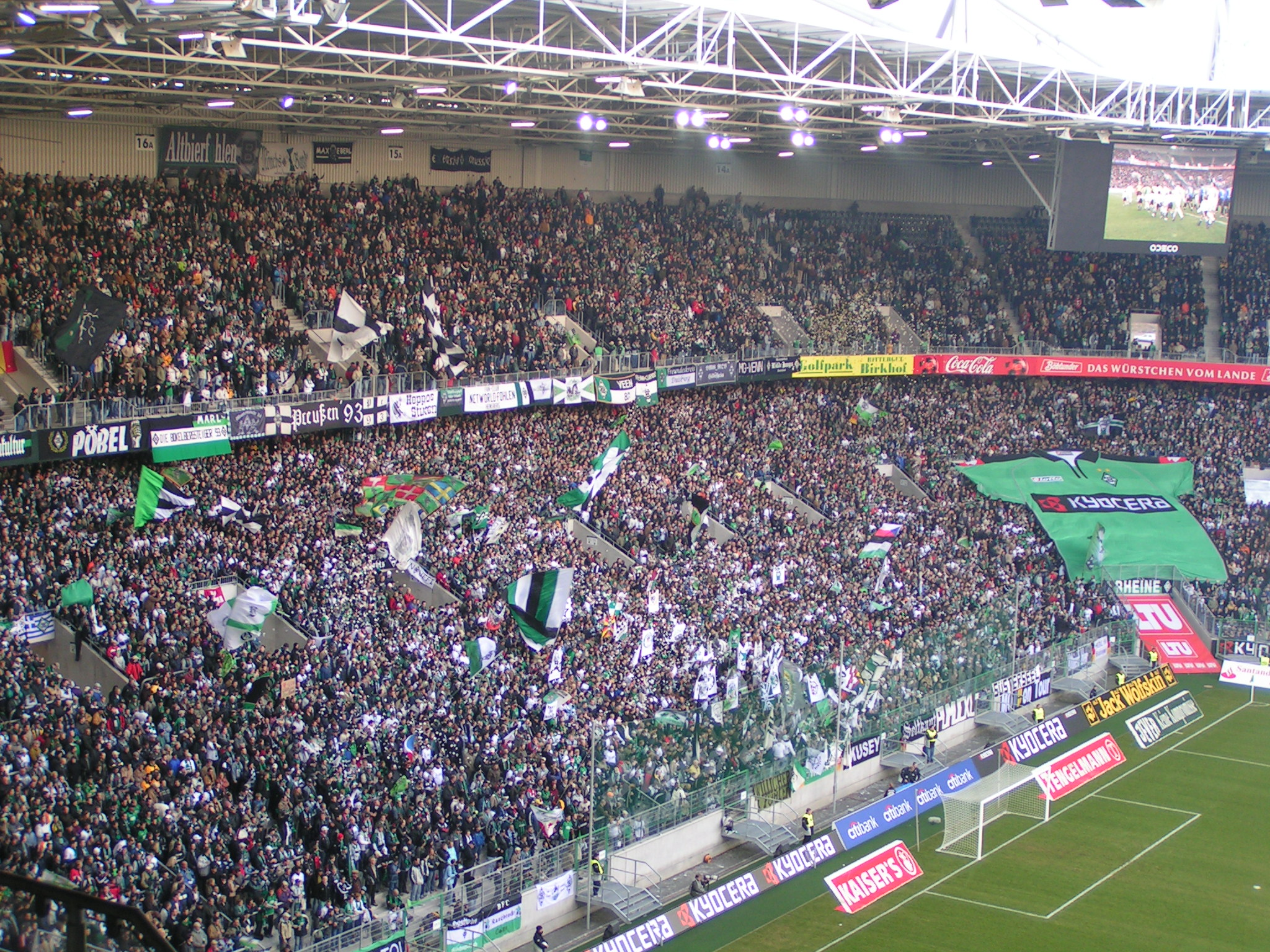
Stadium in Borussia Park, northern bend

Borussia had taken steps to improve their financial situation with the construction of their new stadium called Borussia-Park with a permitted capacity of 59,771 spectators (limited to 54,067 for Bundesliga games and to 46,249 for international games). The club had long been hindered by playing in a much smaller and older facility (Bökelberg, capacity 34,500), and with the opening of the new stadium in 2004 can look forward to increased revenues through higher ticket sales and the ability to host lucrative international matches.

On the 31st matchday of the 2006–07 season, Borussia Mönchengladbach were relegated from the Bundesliga after Arminia Bielefeld won against Werder Bremen 3–2, while Mönchengladbach lost 1–0 at home to VfB Stuttgart. They were promoted back to the Bundesliga on the 32nd match-day of the 2007–08 season after winning the match against SV Wehen 3–0.

=== 2010–2017: Revival ===
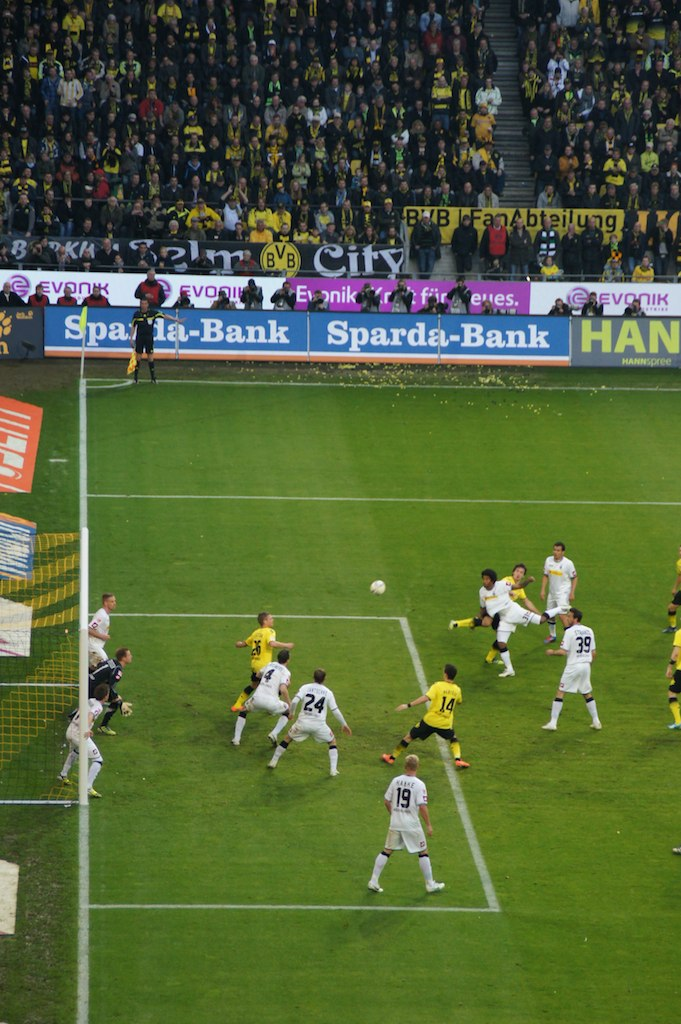
Borussia Mönchengladbach against Borussia Dortmund in April 2012

For the 110th anniversary of the club, the club brought out a DVD on which the club's story is told in a 110-minute film. On 28 July 2010, it was premiered in a cinema in Mönchengladbach.

In the 2010–11 DFB Cup, for the first time after five years the round of 16 was reached. In the Bundesliga, they succeeded after 16 years in getting the first victory against Bayer Leverkusen, but at the end of the preliminary round, the club were in last place.

Due to the seasonally poor athletic performance, a merger of leaders from the local economy founded the initiative Borussia, which accused the club management of mismanagement. According to the initiative, the old, encrusted structures should be dissolved in order to give Borussia a future. So the money should be invested in the sport rather than in the planned museum complex with attached hotel. At the 2011 Annual General Meeting, only 335 of the 4769 members present voted in favour of the initiative's goals.

At the Bundesliga home game against Mainz 05, Marco Reus scored the 2500th Bundesliga goal in the 1445th game. Other Jubiläumstorschützen were Jupp Heynckes (500), Carsten Nielsen (1000), Uwe Rahn (1500) and Martin Dahlin (2000).

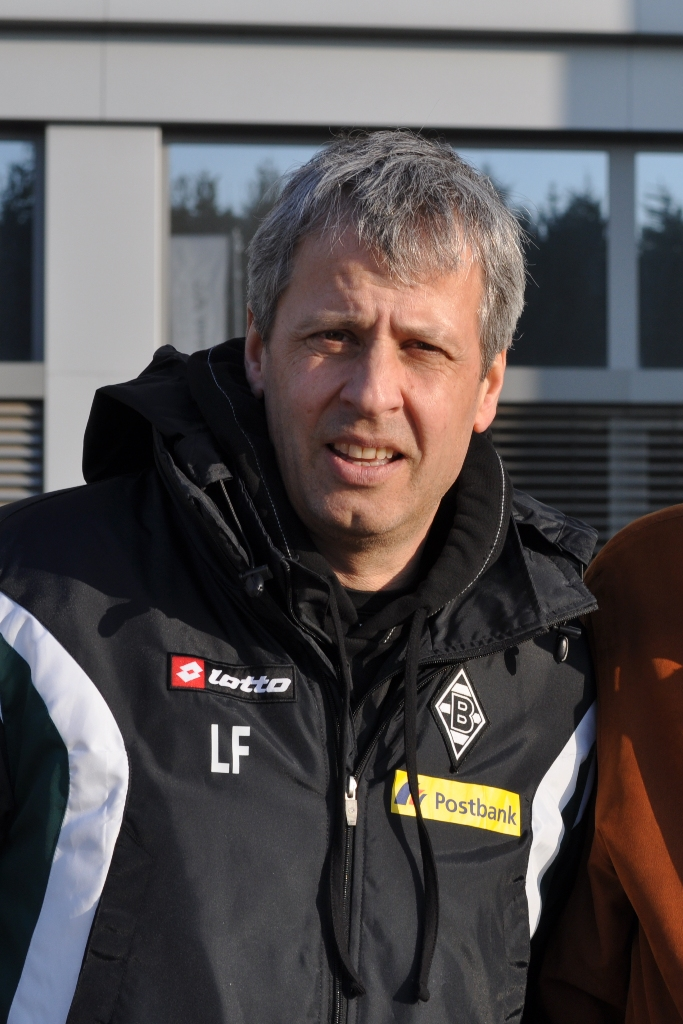
Lucien Favre, manager from 2011 to 2015

The first newcomer in the winter break was the free transfer of striker Mike Hanke of Hannover 96. The defence was reinforced with Håvard Nordtveit and Martin Stranzl. On 13 February 2011, Michael Frontzeck was dismissed due to continued failure as a coach. Decisive were defeats against the direct relegation competitors VfB Stuttgart and FC St. Pauli. Lucien Favre was hired as the new head coach. After the team had been in the last place in the table until the 30th match day, they achieved three consecutive wins and reached 16th place after a 1–1 draw at the last game day, which allowed one last chance to remain in the league. Borussia competed in two relegation matches against the second league team VfL Bochum and were able to prevent relegation with a 1–0 at home and a 1–1 draw in Bochum.

Under Favre, who took over in January 2011, Borussia Mönchengladbach has in recent years shown ambitions to re-establish themselves in the top regions of the Bundesliga. In the 2010–11 season, after a disastrous first half of the season, Borussia Mönchengladbach managed to narrowly avoid relegation through the post-season relegation play-offs.

The following season, 2011–12, followed this up with a strong season in which they were for much of the year in contention for the championship and eventually finished in fourth place. They missed out on qualification to the 2012–13 UEFA Champions League after losing 4–3 on aggregate to Ukrainian club Dynamo Kyiv in the playoff round. During the 2012–13 Bundesliga season, after losing some key players, notably Marco Reus who was voted player of the year in the Bundesliga in the previous season, Borussia Mönchengladbach still contended for the international places until the last match day, eventually finishing in eighth place.

In the 2013–14 Bundesliga season, they had another very successful year, achieving an excellent third-place after the first half of the season and finishing the season in sixth place, entering them into the 2014–15 Europa League competition at the play-off stage. They finished the 2014–15 Bundesliga season in third place, saving the club a place for direct qualification to the 2015–16 UEFA Champions League group stage. The club found itself in a tough group, together with Juventus, Manchester City and Sevilla, and, although they finished bottom of the group, they claimed a respectable points tally of five, claiming draws home and away against Juventus and defeating eventual Europa League winners Sevilla 4–2 at home.

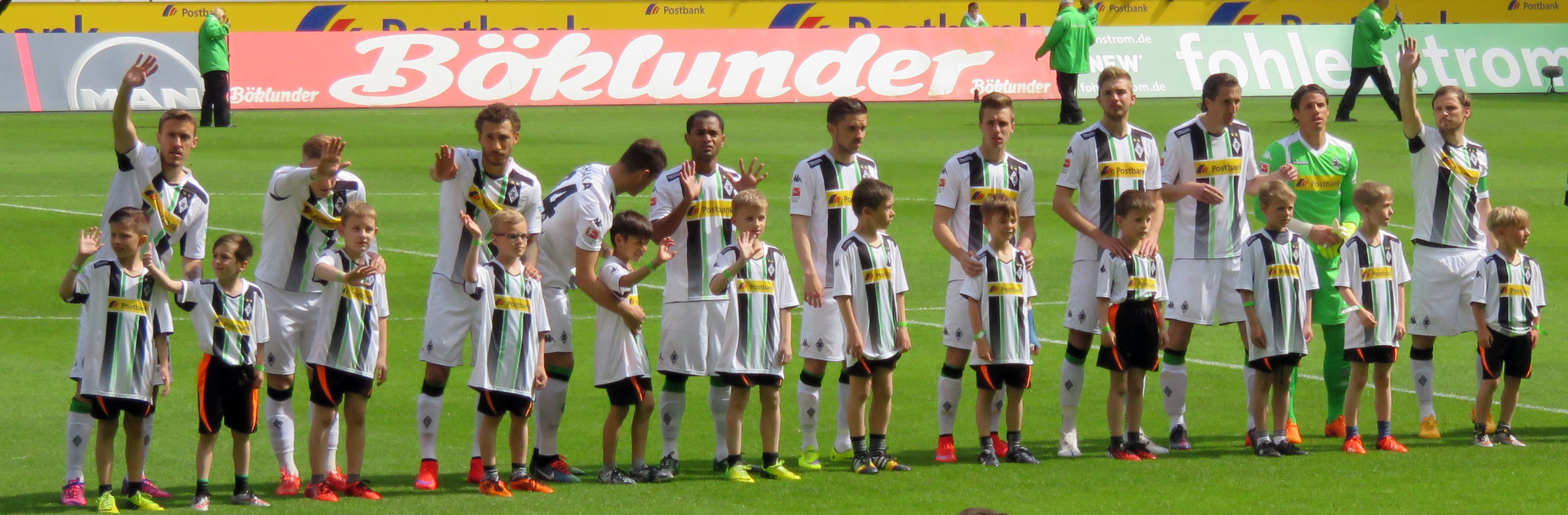
The team of the 2014–15 season before the home game against Bayer 04 Leverkusen on 9 May 2015. Left to right: Kruse; Wendt; Johnson; Xhaka; Raffael; Korb; Herrmann; Kramer; Brouwers; Sommer; and Jantschke.

After a poor start to the 2015–16 Bundesliga season, including five defeats, Favre resigned and was replaced with André Schubert as interim coach. The club's fortunes immediately changed, as it won six-straight Bundesliga matches and eventually finishing the season in fourth position, earning qualification to the Champions League for a second successive season.

In the 2016–17 season, Borussia drew a difficult group in the Champions League, but managed to finish in third place above Celtic and qualify for the UEFA Europa League knockout phase. However, after a promising start in the Bundesliga, the club experienced a poor run of form exacerbated by injuries, and had dropped to the 14th position by the winter break. As a result, André Schubert resigned and was replaced by ex-VfL Wolfsburg manager Dieter Hecking. Hecking began with three wins in four Bundesliga matches as Borussia rose to ninth place and also earned a place in the quarter-finals of the DFB-Pokal.

=== 2017–2021/22: Ascent to the top half of the table ===
A new record transfer was made by the club for the season. For the German international and world champion Matthias Ginter, the club transferred 17 million euros plus bonus payments to Borussia Dortmund. In the ninth edition of the Telekom Cup, Borussia had as early as January of the same year again to be content with the fourth and last place after a defeat on penalties against Werder Bremen and against 1899 Hoffenheim. The first round of the DFB Cup 2017–18 was able to make Borussia victorious. The VfL won the West duel against Rot-Weiss Essen 2–1. In the league prelude, the Fohlenelf kept by a goal of Nico Elvedi 1–0 in the Rheinland derby against 1. FC Köln the upper hand and "overwintered" after a final 3–1 home win against Hamburger SV to half-time as sixth with 28 points from eight wins, four draws and five defeats. In the DFB Cup Borussia were eliminated on 20 December 2017 in the last competitive game of the year after a 0–1 defeat in the second round against Bayer Leverkusen in the Borussia-Park at home, after the "Werkself" had already on the 9th matchday of the Bundesliga at the same place won 5–1. The second round match failed; the decisive goal to 1–2 defeat at 1. FC Köln fell in the fifth minute of stoppage time. By contrast, the financial data in the 2017 financial year was more positive. Despite a lack of participation in international competitions, the association posted the second-best result in its history with a turnover of 179.3 million euros and a profit after tax of 6.56 million euros after the record year 2016. The 2017–18 season ended for Borussia after a 1–2 defeat at Hamburger SV left them in ninth place and thus missed, as in the previous year, the qualification for the European competitions. The game was also the last for Hamburg in the highest German league after 55 years of uninterrupted affiliation.

In July 2018, French striker Alassane Pléa arrived from Nice for a club-record sum of 23 million euros. In the first round of the 2018–19 DFB-Pokal, Mönchengladbach defeated BSC Hastedt 11–1. Thus, Borussia surpassed the previous record, which had been set by the club in an 8–0 victory in the away game at 1. FC Viersen in the first round of the 1977–78 DFB-Pokal.

In the 2019–20 Bundesliga, Mönchengladbach started the season well and was on top of the league in December 2019, after defeating Bayern Munich 2–1. However, a shaky run of results in the second half of the season meant they ultimately finished in fourth place, 17 points behind champions Bayern. Mönchengladbach thus qualified for the UEFA Champions League, and were drawn against Inter Milan, Real Madrid and Shakhtar Donetsk. In Rose's second year in charge during the 2020/21 season, Gladbach achieved their largest win in the Champions League with a 6–0 win over Shakhtar Donetsk, with Alassane Pléa scoring a hat-trick. They advanced to the knockout stage (for the first time in the modern era) after finishing second in Group B, but were ultimately knocked out in the round of 16 by Manchester City. However, following the announcement in February 2021 that Rose would leave to join Borussia Dortmund at the end of the campaign, the team suffered a dip in domestic form and ultimately finished eighth in the Bundesliga.

In May 2021, Adi Hütter was appointed head coach following Rose's departure to Dortmund. Hütter led the team to a tenth-place finish in the 2021/22 season, highlighted by a 5-0 victory against Bayern Munich in the DFB Pokal, before leaving by mutual consent at the end of the campaign.

=== 2022- present: Decline in form ===
Daniel Farke subsequently took charge for the 2022-23 season, but was dismissed after one year following another tenth-place finish that concluded an inconsistent season. Ahead of the 2023/24 season, Gerardo Seoane took over as manager during a major squad overhaul that saw long-serving core players leave the club, including Yann Sommer, Marcus Thuram, Lars Stindl, Ramy Bensebaini and Jonas Hofmann. Under Seoane, Gladbach experienced a drop in domestic form, finishing 14th in the 2023/24 season before recovering to 10th in the following 2024/2025 season. Following a poor start to the 2025/26 season, Seoane was dismissed in September 2025 and replaced by former U23 coach Eugen Polanski, who led the team to a 12th-place finish and was permanently confirmed in the role ahead of the 2026/27 campaign.

== Club culture ==
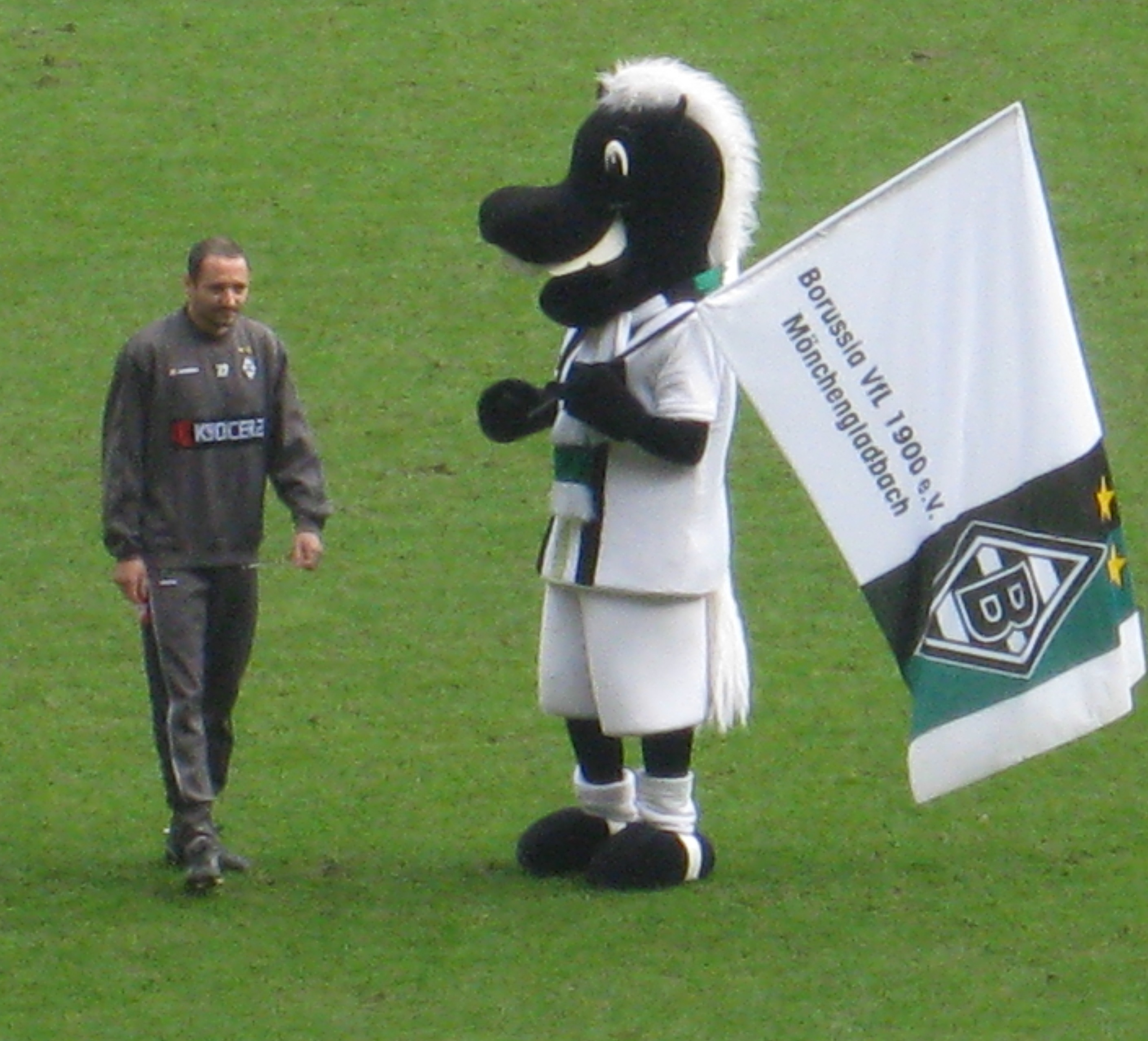
Oliver Neuville and mascot Jünter

=== Songs ===
The official club anthem is the song The Eleven of the Lower Rhine, which is sung before every home game. The song was recorded by the group BO, the band of the fan project.

== Fan culture ==
In addition to celebrity fans like Theo Zwanziger, Wolfgang Thierse, Sven Ottke, Kai Ebel, Mickie Krause, Matthias Opdenhövel, Peer Steinbrück, Stefan Gaede and Hannelore Kraft, there are fan clubs in many countries, as far as California, South Africa and New Zealand.

A known fan group of the club were "Steinwegs Mamm", who provided the drum in the 1960s for the team, and Ethem Özenrenler, known by his nickname "Manolo", who beat the drum in the northern curve of the Bökelberg Stadium for over 25 years since 1977.

=== Friendships ===
==== FSV Mainz 05 ====
After the DFB Cup match against the Mainz 05 on 25 October 1994, a 6–4 win for Mönchengladbach, a fan friendship developed between Mainz and Borussia, which is now maintained by only a few supporters.

==== Liverpool ====
On the other hand, there is a long friendship with Liverpool, which comes from the time both teams regularly met in international games.

Fans of Borussia travel to Liverpool at regular intervals to watch local Reds games. Conversely, followers from Liverpool still use a visit to Mönchengladbach to symbolise the mutual fan friendship of both clubs.

The fans of Mönchengladbach collected 21,000 DM for the families of the 96 dead in the stadium disaster in Sheffield (1989) and presented it to Liverpool in 1991 in Mönchengladbach.

For the 110th anniversary of the club on 1 August 2010, Liverpool were the opponents in a friendly match. The match in front of 51,515 spectators in the Borussia Park Mönchengladbach was won by Borussia, 1–0.

=== Rivalries ===
==== 1. FC Köln ====
By contrast, there is a strong sporting rivalry between Mönchengladbach and the regional rival 1. FC Köln.

Widely considered the most severe of Mönchengladbach's rivalries, the animosities between Mönchengladbach and Cologne had their spark in 1964, when Cologne manager Hennes Weisweiler switched allegiance in favour of Mönchengladbach.

Mönchengladbach's stadium, Borussia-Park, is furthermore located at a road named Hennes-Weisweiler-Allee in Weisweiler's memory.

This initial outrage on behalf of FC Köln supporters was soon met with a serious sporting rivalry: Although Cologne initially had had the athletic edge as a founding member of the Bundesliga and the league's first champion, Mönchengladbach quickly closed the gap. Between the seasons 1969–70 and 1977–78, Mönchengladbach won five championships, Cologne won one, and Bayern Munich secured the remaining three.

The 77–78 season has become remembered in both club's collective memories: Although Mönchengladbach defeated Borussia Dortmund in the highest victory in Bundesliga history with a crushing 12–0, Cologne carried the championship with a 5–0 win over FC St. Pauli due to their slightly better goal difference (+45 versus +42 in Cologne's favour). To add insult to injury, Cologne was back under the leadership of Hennes Weisweiler, the personified point of contention between both clubs.

Although neither club has been able to win a Bundesliga title since the 1977–78 season, the rivalry remains, with several incidents of violence between supporters of both clubs. Overall, Mönchengladbach has been more successful in matches between the two, winning 54 out of 105 duels, drawing 20 and losing 31. Notably,

Mönchengladbach is more likely to win than FC Köln even in away matches (24–10–17 in Mönchengladbach's favour).

The first iteration of Borussia vs FC Köln was played on 1 January 1961 in front of a crowd of 11,000 in Oberliga West (1947–63). Cologne defeated Mönchengladbach 4–1.

==== Bayern Munich ====
Both Mönchengladbach and Munich had not been starters in the Bundesliga – each won their right to a spot starting with the 1965–66 season. Munich finished third, Mönchengladbach 13th.

Both clubs rose to dominance between the 1969–70 and 1976–77 seasons, when five championships went to Mönchengladbach and three to Munich.

However, with Mönchengladbach's decline in the 1980s and 1990s, Munich could firmly assert its dominance in both the Bundesliga and in the direct comparisons with Borussia: out of 119 matches played Munich won 61, Mönchengladbach won 29 and the two clubs drew 32.

Yet, Mönchengladbach has remained a notable wildcard with the ability to inflict painful defeats on Munich, for example when Igor de Camargo scored the decisive goal in the 1–0 victory in the first ever game of goalkeeper Manuel Neuer and defender Jérôme Boateng at Munich on 7 August 2011.

Gladbach was also able to win in Munich in 2015 with a 0–2 victory, one of the few victories over Bayern in their home stadium, as well as being a rare domestic loss for then-Bayern manager, Pep Guardiola.

On 27 October 2021, Gladbach beat Bayern 5–0 in a DFB Pokal (German Cup) match, the worst Bayern loss since 1978 in any competition.

==== Borussia Dortmund ====
While not nearly as pronounced as Dortmund's rivalry against Schalke 04 or Mönchengladbach's own struggle against 1. FC Köln, Dortmund and Mönchengladbach still occasionally lock horns, mostly because of the naming similarity.

Both are the two Borussias of the Bundesliga. The song Es gibt nur eine Borussia ('there is only one Borussia') is popular among Mönchengladbach supporters when facing Dortmund squads. The duel between the two has been dubbed the Borussengipfel, the Borussia Summit, in the media.

== Sponsors and kit manufacturers ==
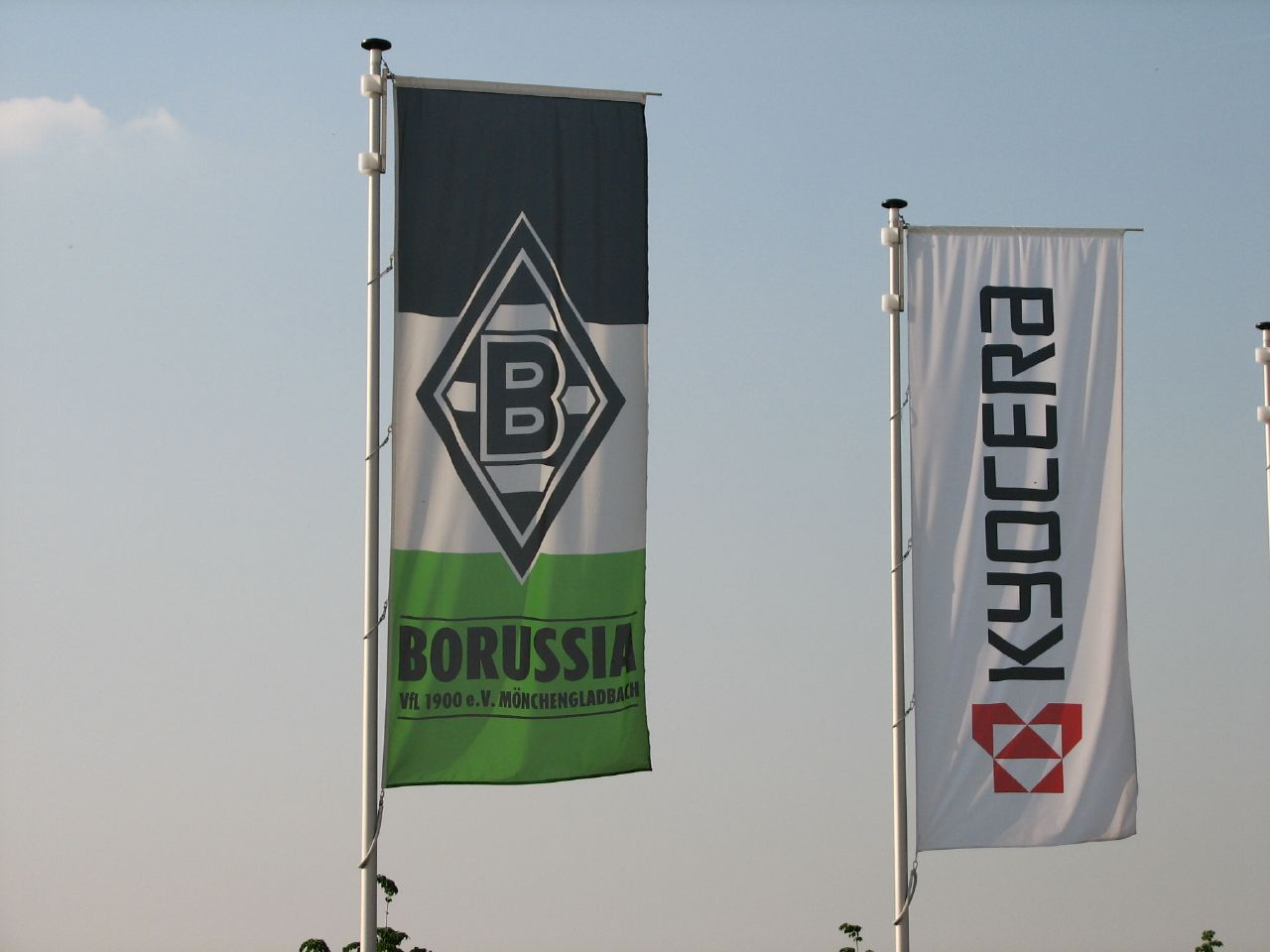
Flags of Borussia and the former sponsor Kyocera

| Year | Shirt sponsor | Branch |
|---|---|---|
| 1976–1980 | Erdgas | Energy/Natural gas |
| 1980–1983 | Datsun | Cars |
| 1983–1990 | Erdgas | Energy/Natural gas |
| 1990–1992 | Tuborg | Brewery |
| 1992–1994 | Trigema | Sportswear |
| 1994–1997 | Diebels | Brewery |
| 1997–2002 | Belinea | Hardware |
| 2002–2005 | Jever | Brewery |
| 2005–2009 | Kyocera | Electronics and ceramics |
| 2009–2020 | Postbank | Retail banking |
| 2020–2024 | Flatex | Online broker |
| 2024–present | Reuter | Online bathroom retailer |

| Year | Manufacturer |
|---|---|
| 1976–1992 | Puma |
| 1992–1995 | ASICS |
| 1995–2003 | Reebok |
| 2003–2013 | Lotto |
| 2013–2018 | Kappa |
| 2018–present | Puma |

== Players and staff ==
=== Current squad ===
As of 24 October 2026

Note: Flags indicate national team as defined under FIFA eligibility rules; some limited exceptions apply. Players may hold more than one non-FIFA nationality.

| No. | Pos. | Nation | Player |
|---|---|---|---|
| 1 | GK | GER | Moritz Nicolas |
| 2 | DF | ITA | Fabio Chiarodia |
| 3 | FW | SWE | Isac Lidberg |
| 4 | DF | IDN | Kevin Diks (vice-captain) |
| 5 | DF | POL | Jan Leszczyński |
| 6 | DF | JPN | Kō Itakura |
| 7 | MF | AUT | Kevin Stöger |
| 8 | MF | GER | Enzo Leopold |
| 9 | FW | FRA | Franck Honorat |
| 10 | MF | GER | Florian Neuhaus |
| 11 | FW | GER | Tim Kleindienst (captain) |
| 14 | DF | JPN | Daiki Hashioka (on loan from Slavia Prague) |
| 16 | MF | GER | Philipp Sander |
| 17 | MF | KOR | Jens Castrop |
| 18 | FW | JPN | Shūto Machino |
| 19 | FW | GER | Nicolas Kühn (on loan from Como) |

| No. | Pos. | Nation | Player |
|---|---|---|---|
| 20 | DF | GER | David Herold |
| 21 | GK | GER | Tobias Sippel |
| 22 | DF | UKR | Yukhym Konoplya |
| 23 | GK | GER | Jan Olschowsky |
| 25 | FW | GER | Robin Hack |
| 26 | DF | GER | Lukas Ullrich |
| 27 | MF | GER | Fritz Fleck |
| 29 | DF | USA | Joe Scally |
| 33 | GK | GER | Daniel Batz |
| 34 | MF | GER | Mathieu Nguefack |
| 35 | FW | GER | Josiah Uwakhonye |
| 36 | MF | GER | Wael Mohya |
| 38 | FW | SWE | Hugo Bolin |
| 39 | FW | GBS | Iaia Manco Danfa |
| 47 | MF | JPN | Zento Uno |
| 48 | DF | GER | Lion Schweers |

=== Out on loan ===
Note: Flags indicate national team as defined under FIFA eligibility rules; some limited exceptions apply. Players may hold more than one non-FIFA nationality.

| No. | Pos. | Nation | Player |
|---|---|---|---|
| — | GK | LUX | Tiago Pereira Cardoso (at RAAL La Louvière until 30 June 2027) |
| — | MF | CRO | Niko Horvat (at Zulte Waregem until 30 June 2027) |
| — | MF | GER | Niklas Swider (at Viktoria Köln until 30 June 2027) |

| No. | Pos. | Nation | Player |
|---|---|---|---|
| — | FW | CZE | Tomáš Čvančara (at Hradec Králové until 30 June 2027) |
| — | FW | GER | Jan Urbich (at Eintracht Braunschweig until 30 June 2027) |

=== Retired numbers ===
- 12 – the 12th man, dedicated to fans

=== Coaching and backroom staff ===
| Position | Staff |
|---|---|
| Head coach | (Germany) Alexander Blessin |
| Assistant coach | (Germany) Markus Gellhaus (Germany) Jan-Moritz Lichte |
| Goalkeeper coach | (Germany) André Wachter |
| Trainer scout | (Germany) Tony Jantschke |
| Co-trainer analysis | (Germany) Philipp Schützendorf |
| Sporting director | (Germany) Rouven Schröder |
| Scouting and recruitment director | (Germany) André Hechelmann |
| Scouting coach | (Germany) Roland Virkus |
| Team manager | (Germany) Yannick Langesberg |
| Player-care manager | (Germany) Sophie Günthel |
| Sports technologies coordinator | (Germany) Marvin Begemann |
| Head of prevention and rehab | (Germany) Alexander Mouhcine |
| Head of performance | (Germany) Jörn Menger |
| Athletic trainer | (Germany) Jonas Bode (Germany) Luca Schuster |
| Rehab coach | (Germany) Philipp Schmidt |
| Chief analyst | (Germany) Johannes Riegger |
| Video analyst | (Germany) Sebastian Koch (Germany) Jan-Ole Heck |
| Head of medical | (Germany) Klaus Schmitz |
| Club doctor | (Germany) Dr. Heribert Ditzel (Germany) Dr. Stefan Hertl (Germany) Nils Haupt (Germany) Dr. Roman Ditzel |
| Medical director physiotherapy | (Germany) Ron Rohloff |
| Physiotherapist | (Germany) Dirk Müller (Germany) Benedikt Bohnen (Germany) Tim Kraks |
| Masseur | (Poland) Adam Szordykowski |
| Dietitians | (Germany) Hannah Stormanns |
| Interpreter | (Japan) Atsushi Waki |
| Kit manager/Bus driver | (Germany) Marcus Breuer (Germany) Sven Hesselink |

=== History of head coaches ===
Borussia Mönchengladbach coaching history from 1946 to present
| (West Germany) Hans Krätschmer (1946–49); (West Germany) Werner Sottong (1949–50); (West Germany) Heinz Ditgens & Paul Pohl (1950–51); (West Germany) Fritz Pliska (1951–53); (West Germany) Fritz Silken (1953–55); (West Germany) Klaus Dondorf (1955–57); (West Germany) Fritz Pliska (1957–60); (West Germany) Bernd Oles (1960–62); (West Germany) Fritz Langner (1 July 1962 – 25 April 1964); (West Germany) Hennes Weisweiler (1 July 1964 – 30 June 1975); (West Germany) Udo Lattek (1 July 1975 – 30 June 1979); (West Germany) Jupp Heynckes (1 July 1979 – 30 June 1987); (West Germany) Wolf Werner (1 July 1987 – 21 November 1989); (Germany) Gerd vom Bruch (22 Nov 1989 – 25 September 1991); (Austria) Bernd Krauss (interim) (25 Sep 1991 – 7 October 1991); (Germany) Jürgen Gelsdorf (3 Oct 1991 – 5 November 1992); (Austria) Bernd Krauss (6 Nov 1991 – 7 December 1996); (Germany) Hannes Bongartz (19 Dec 1996 – 29 November 1997); (Germany) Norbert Meier (1 Dec 1997 – 31 March 1998); (Germany) Friedel Rausch (1 April 1998 – 10 November 1998); (Germany) Rainer Bonhof (10 Nov 1998 – 31 August 1999) | (Germany) Manfred Stefes (interim) (1999–00); (Germany) Hans Meyer (7 Sep 1999 – 1 March 2003); (Germany) Ewald Lienen (2 March 2003 – 21 September 2003); (Germany) Holger Fach (21 Sep 2003 – 27 October 2004); (Germany) Horst Köppel (interim) (27 Oct 2004 – 1 November 2004); (Netherlands) Dick Advocaat (2 Nov 2004 – 18 April 2005); (Germany) Horst Köppel (18 April 2005 – 14 May 2006); (Norway) Jörn Andersen (interim) (14 May 2006 – 30 June 2006); (Germany) Jupp Heynckes (1 July 2006 – 2 February 2007); (Netherlands) Jos Luhukay (31 Jan 2007 – 5 October 2008); (Germany) Christian Ziege (interim) (5 Oct 2008 – 18 October 2008); (Germany) Hans Meyer (18 Oct 2008 – 28 May 2009); (Germany) Michael Frontzeck (1 July 2009 – 13 February 2011); (Switzerland) Lucien Favre (14 Feb 2011 – 20 September 2015); (Germany) André Schubert (21 Sep 2015 – 21 December 2016); (Germany) Dieter Hecking (4 Jan 2017 – 18 May 2019); (Germany) Marco Rose (18 May 2019 – 30 June 2021); (Austria) Adi Hütter (1 July 2021 – 18 May 2022); (Germany) Daniel Farke (4 June 2022 – 2 June 2023); (Switzerland) Gerardo Seoane (1 July 2023 – 16 September 2025); (Poland) Eugen Polanski (16 September 2025 – 13 September 2026); (Germany) Jan-Moritz Lichte (interim) (13 September 2026 – 22 September 2026); (Germany) Alexander Blessin (22 September 2026 – ) |

== Notable former players ==
- (Algeria) Ramy Bensebaini
- (Algeria) Karim Matmour
- (Angola) Nando Rafael
- (Argentina) Federico Insúa
- (Armenia) Grant-Leon Ranos
- (Australia) Jacob Italiano
- (Australia) Mathew Leckie
- (Australia) Craig Moore
- (Austria) Martin Hinteregger
- (Austria) Bernd Krauss
- (Austria) Stefan Lainer
- (Austria) Martin Stranzl
- (Belgium) Logan Bailly
- (Belgium) Filip Daems
- (Belgium) Igor de Camargo
- (Belgium) Thorgan Hazard
- (Bosnia and Herzegovina) Haris Tabaković
- (Brazil) Dante
- (Brazil) Giovane Élber
- (Brazil) Marcelo Pletsch
- (Brazil) Raffael
- (Cameroon) Mohamadou Idrissou
- (Cameroon) Marcel Ndjeng
- (Cameroon) Nathan Ngoumou
- (Canada) Rob Friend
- (Canada) Paul Stalteri
- (Republic of the Congo) Macchambes Younga-Mouhani
- (Croatia) Slađan Ašanin
- (Czech Republic) Tomáš Galásek
- (Czech Republic) Ivo Ulich
- (Democratic Republic of the Congo) Elias Kachunga
- (Denmark) Andreas Christensen
- (Denmark) Ulrik le Fevre
- (Denmark) Henning Jensen
- (Denmark) Carsten Nielsen
- (Denmark) Peter Nielsen
- (Denmark) Allan Simonsen
- (Denmark) Jannik Vestergaard
- (England) Reece Oxford
- (Finland) Alexander Ring
- (France) Michaël Cuisance
- (France) Manu Koné
- (France) Alassane Pléa
- (France) Marcus Thuram
- (Germany) Rainer Bonhof
- (Germany) Hans-Günter Bruns
- (Germany) Hans-Jörg Criens
- (Germany) Mahmoud Dahoud
- (Germany) Max Eberl
- (Germany) Michael Frontzeck
- (Germany) Matthias Ginter
- (Germany) Wilfried Hannes
- (Germany) Patrick Herrmann
- (Germany) Jupp Heynckes
- (Germany) Jonas Hofmann
- (Germany) Christian Hochstätter
- (Germany) Tony Jantschke
- (Germany) Uwe Kamps
- (Germany) Wolfgang Kleff
- (Germany) Michael Klinkert
- (Germany) Horst Köppel
- (Germany) Christoph Kramer
- (Germany) Max Kruse
- (Germany) Christian Kulik
- (Germany) Herbert Laumen
- (Germany) Ewald Lienen
- (Germany) Marko Marin
- (Germany) Lothar Matthäus
- (Germany) Frank Mill
- (Germany) Luca Netz
- (Germany) Günter Netzer
- (Germany) Jörg Neun
- (Germany) Oliver Neuville
- (Germany) Uwe Rahn
- (Germany) Rocco Reitz
- (Germany) Marco Reus
- (Germany) Bernd Rupp
- (Germany) Frank Schäffer
- (Germany) Martin Schneider
- (Germany) Lars Stindl
- (Germany) Marc-André ter Stegen
- (Germany) Berti Vogts
- (Germany) Julian Weigl
- (Germany) Herbert Wimmer
- (Germany) Christian Ziege
- (Ghana) Lawrence Aidoo
- (Guinea) Ibrahima Traoré
- (Hungary) Krisztián Lisztes
- (Iran) Dennis Eckert
- (Israel) Gal Alberman
- (Israel) Roberto Colautti
- (Israel) Shmuel Rosenthal
- (Italy) Vincenzo Grifo
- (Ivory Coast) Steve Gohouri
- (Japan) Yūki Ōtsu
- (Japan) Kōta Takai
- (Luxembourg) Yvandro Borges Sanches
- (Luxembourg) Jeff Strasser
- (Mali) Soumaïla Coulibaly
- (Netherlands) Roel Brouwers
- (Netherlands) Luuk de Jong
- (Netherlands) Patrick Paauwe
- (Netherlands) Arie van Lent
- (Nigeria) Pascal Ojigwe
- (Norway) Kai Erik Herlovsen
- (Norway) Joshua King
- (Norway) Håvard Nordtveit
- (Paraguay) Raúl Bobadilla
- (Poland) Andrzej Juskowiak
- (Poland) Eugen Polanski
- (Portugal) Zé António
- (Romania) Ioan Lupescu
- (Russia) Roman Neustädter
- (Slovakia) László Bénes
- (Slovakia) Igor Demo
- (South Africa) Bradley Carnell
- (Rwanda) Leroy-Jacques Mickels
- (Spain) Álvaro Domínguez
- (Sweden) Patrik Andersson
- (Sweden) Martin Dahlin
- (Sweden) Branimir Hrgota
- (Sweden) Jörgen Pettersson
- (Sweden) Oscar Wendt
- (Switzerland) Winsley Boteli
- (Switzerland) Josip Drmić
- (Switzerland) Nico Elvedi
- (Switzerland) Breel Embolo
- (Switzerland) Michael Lang
- (Switzerland) Jonas Omlin
- (Switzerland) Yann Sommer
- (Switzerland) Granit Xhaka
- (Switzerland) Denis Zakaria
- (Togo) Peniel Mlapa
- (Togo) Bachirou Salou
- (Tunisia) Mehdi Ben Slimane
- (Turkey) Yunus Mallı
- (United States) Michael Bradley
- (United States) Fabian Johnson
- (United States) Kasey Keller
- (United States) Jordan Pefok
- (United States) Giovanni Reyna
- (Ukraine) Igor Belanov
- (Ukraine) Andriy Voronin
- (Venezuela) Juan Arango

== UEFA club rankings ==
As of 24 June 2026

| Rank | Team | |
|---|---|---|
| 105 | (Spain) Celta Vigo | 16.250 |
| 106 | (Croatia) Rijeka | 16.125 |
| 107 | (Germany) Borussia Mönchengladbach | 16.000 |
| 108 | (Spain) Girona | 15.723 |
| 109 | (Spain) Osasuna | 15.723 |

== Honours ==
Borussia Mönchengladbach's five Bundesliga championships entitle the club to display two gold stars of the "Verdiente Meistervereine".

Borussia Mönchengladbach's honours
| Type | Competition | Seasons |
|---|---|---|
| Domestic | Bundesliga | Winners: 1969–70, 1970–71, 1974–75, 1975–76, 1976–77 |
| Domestic | Bundesliga | Runners-up: 1973–74, 1977–78 |
| Domestic | 2. Bundesliga | Winners: 2007–08 |
| Domestic | DFB-Pokal | Winners: 1959–60, 1972–73, 1994–95 |
| Domestic | DFB-Pokal | Runners-up: 1983–84, 1991–92 |
| Domestic | German Supercup | Runners-up: 1995 |
| European | European Cup | Runners-up: 1976–77 |
| European | UEFA Cup | Winners: 1974–75, 1978–79 |
| European | UEFA Cup | Runners-up: 1972–73, 1979–80 |
| International | Intercontinental Cup | Runners-up: 1977 |

== Records and statistics ==
=== Most appearances ===
Only for Bundesliga

As of June 2026.

| Rank | Player | Matches |
|---|---|---|
| 1 | (Germany) Berti Vogts | 419 |
| 2 | (Germany) Uwe Kamps | 390 |
| 3 | (Germany) Herbert Wimmer | 366 |
| 4 | (Germany) Patrick Herrmann | 351 |
| 5 | (Germany) Christian Hochstätter | 339 |
| 6 | (Germany) Hans-Günter Bruns | 331 |
| 7 | (Germany) Wolfgang Kleff | 321 |
| 8 | (Switzerland) Nico Elvedi | 318 |
| 9 | (Germany) Hans-Jörg Criens | 290 |
| 10 | (Germany) Jupp Heynckes | 283 |

=== Top scorers ===
Only for Bundesliga

As of June 2026.

| Rank | Player | Goals |
|---|---|---|
| 1 | (Germany) Jupp Heynckes | 195 |
| 2 | (Germany) Herbert Laumen | 97 |
| 3 | (Germany) Hans-Jörg Criens | 92 |
| 4 | (Germany) Günter Netzer | 82 |
| 5 | (Germany) Uwe Rahn | 81 |
| 6 | (Denmark) Allan Simonsen | 76 |
| 7 | (Germany) Frank Mill | 71 |
| 8 | (Germany) Lars Stindl | 62 |
| 9 | (Germany) Hans-Günter Bruns | 61 |
| 10 | (Sweden) Martin Dahlin | 60 |

=== Record matches ===
==== Biggest Wins ====
Bundesliga

- Borussia Mönchengladbach 12–0 Borussia Dortmund, 29 April 1978

DFB-Pokal

- BSC Hastedt 1–11 Borussia Mönchengladbach, 19 August 2018

European Competitions

- Borussia Mönchengladbach (Germany) 10–0 (Cyprus) EPA Larnaca, 22 September 1970

Unofficial

- Borussia Mönchengladbach (Germany) 21–4 Vatican City, 13 August 2016

== Players' honours ==
For a list of every Borussia Mönchengladbach player with 100 or more appearances, see List of Borussia Mönchengladbach players

Players of the club achieved the following honours:

Ballon d'Or
| Country | Year | Player |
|---|---|---|
| Denmark | 1977 | Allan Simonsen |

Player of the Year
| Country | Year | Player |
|---|---|---|
| Germany | 1971 | Berti Vogts |
| Germany | 1972 | Günter Netzer |
| Germany | 1973 | Günter Netzer |
| Germany | 1979 | Berti Vogts |
| Germany | 1987 | Uwe Rahn |
| Germany | 2012 | Marco Reus |
| Australia | 1996 | Damian Mori |
| Austria | 1986 | Anton Polster |
| Austria | 1997 | Anton Polster |
| Belgium | 2001 | Wesley Sonck |
| Denmark | 1994 | Thomas Helveg |
| Sweden | 1993 | Martin Dahlin |
| Sweden | 1995 | Patrik Andersson |
| Sweden | 2001 | Patrik Andersson |
| United States | 1997 | Kasey Keller |
| United States | 1999 | Kasey Keller |
| United States | 2005 | Kasey Keller |

Bundesliga Top Scorers
| Country | Year | Goals | Player |
|---|---|---|---|
| Germany | 1974 | 30 | Jupp Heynckes (jointly with Gerd Müller (Bayern Munich)) |
| Germany | 1975 | 29 | Jupp Heynckes |
| Germany | 1987 | 24 | Uwe Rahn |
| Germany | 1995 | 20 | Heiko Herrlich (jointly with Mario Basler (Werder Bremen)) |

Goal of the Year
| Year | Country | Player |
|---|---|---|
| 1971 | Denmark | Ulrik Le Fevre |
| 1972 | Germany | Günter Netzer |
| 1973 | Germany | Günter Netzer |
| 1978 | Germany | Rainer Bonhof |
| 1979 | Germany | Harald Nickel |
| 2005 | Denmark | Kasper Bögelund |
| 2006 | Germany | Oliver Neuville |

Goal of the Season
| Season | Country | Player |
|---|---|---|
| 2012–13 | Venezuela | Juan Arango |
| 2020–21 | Austria | Valentino Lazaro |

== Literature ==
- Werner Jakobs; Rainer Kalb; Markus Aretz (1999), 100 Jahre Borussia Mönchengladbach – Die Borussen-Chronik (in German), Düsseldorf: Verlag Rheinsport networking, ISBN 3-934702-00-7
- Holger Jenrich; Markus Aretz (2005), Die Elf vom Niederrhein. 40 Jahre Borussia Mönchengladbach in der Bundesliga (in German), Göttingen: Verlag Die Werkstatt, ISBN 3-89533-503-7
- Helmut Grashoff; Susanne Grashoff (2005), Meine launische Diva: 30 Jahre mit Borussia Mönchengladbach (in German), Norderstedt: Radtke & Bahr GbR, ISBN 3-00-016918-0
- Holger Jenrich (2007), Das Borussia Mönchengladbach Lexikon (in German), Göttingen: Verlag Die Werkstatt, ISBN 978-3-89533-585-3
- Markus Aretz; Ingo Rütten (2008), Akte Aufstieg: Borussias Tagebuch der Saison 2007/08 (in German), Göttingen: Verlag Die Werkstatt, ISBN 978-3-89533-626-3
