= Jan-Moritz Lichte =

German football manager (born 1980)

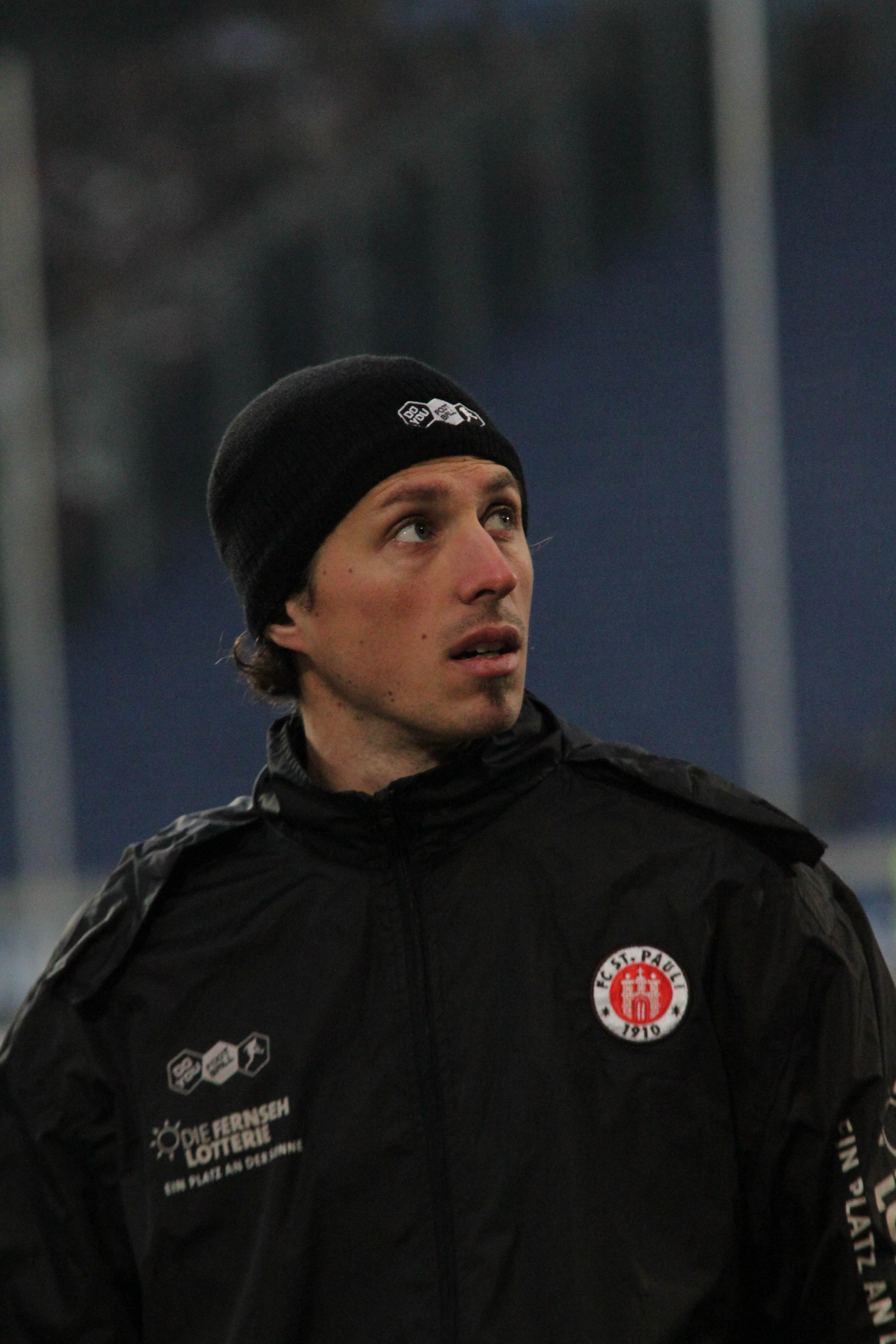
- Lichte with FC St. Pauli in 2012

Personal information
- Date of birth: 12 January 1980 (age 46)
- Place of birth: Kassel, West Germany
- Height: 1.89 m (6 ft 2 in)
- Position: Midfielder

Youth career
- –1998: KSV Baunatal

Senior career*
Years	Team	Apps	(Gls)
1998–2007	KSV Baunatal	258	(29)
2007–2009	SC Paderborn II		

Managerial career
- 2020: Mainz 05
- 2026: Borussia Mönchengladbach (interim)
- * Club domestic league appearances and goals

Jan-Moritz Lichte (born 12 January 1980) is a German football manager. As a player, he played for KSV Baunatal. He was an assistant manager at Mainz 05 between 2017 and 2020.

== Playing career ==
Lichte began his playing career in the youth teams of KSV Baunatal, before transferring to their first team in 1998.Across nine seasons, the midfielder appeared 258 times in the fifth-tier Oberliga Hessen. During the 2007–08 season, Lichte played for the reserve side of SC Paderborn. In April 2009, he retired at the age of 29.

== Managerial career ==
Lichte passed his coaching course in 2009 as the best on the course. He had taken the course at the Hennes-Weisweiler-Academy alongside Sascha Lewandowski, amongst others.

Lichte was assistant manager at Bundesliga side Bayer Leverkusen from 2012 until 2014. For the 2014–15 season, he switched to Hannover 96 as assistant manager and was responsible for the youth teams at the club the following season.

From the 2017–18 season, Lichte was assistant manager of Mainz 05. On the seventh matchday of the 2019–20 Bundesliga, he was responsible for managing the side against SC Paderborn due to a red card shown to manager Sandro Schwarz in their previous match.He became head coach of the club in September 2020 on a temporary basis after they parted company with manager Achim Beierlorzer. He was sacked on 28 December 2020.His final match was a DFB-Pokal against VfL Bochum on 23 December 2020 where Mainz lost in a shootout.He finished with a record of one win, four draws, and seven losses.

In September 2026, he was named inteirm head coach of Borussia Mönchengladbach for one game.

== Personal life ==
In 2008, Lichte graduated from Paderborn University with a degree in sports science. His younger brother Henning played for the reserve team of Mainz 05 in the 2004–05 Regionalliga Süd.

== Managerial record ==
As of match played 23 December 2020

Team	From	To	Record								Ref.
Team	From	To	M	W	D	L	GF	GA	GD	Win %	Ref.
Mainz 05	28 September 2020	28 December 2020	12	1	4	7	12	21	−9	8.33	
Total			12	1	4	7	12	21	−9	8.33	—
