= Heinz Ditgens =

German footballer and manager

Personal information
- Date of birth: 3 July 1914
- Place of birth: Mönchengladbach, Germany
- Date of death: 20 June 1998 (aged 83)
- Place of death: Mönchengladbach, Germany
- Position: Midfielder

Senior career*
Years	Team	Apps	(Gls)
1930–1950	Borussia Mönchengladbach		

International career
1936–1938	Germany	3	(0)

Managerial career
- 1950–1951: Borussia Mönchengladbach
- * Club domestic league appearances and goals

Heinz Ditgens (3 July 1914 – 20 June 1998) was a German professional footballer who played club football for Borussia Mönchengladbach. He won three caps for the Germany national side between 1936 and 1938, participating at the 1936 Summer Olympics, and became Borussia Mönchengladbach's first ever international player in the process. Ditgens also fought at Stalingrad in World War II.
