= Fritz Pliska =

German officer and Knight's Cross recipient (1915–1995)

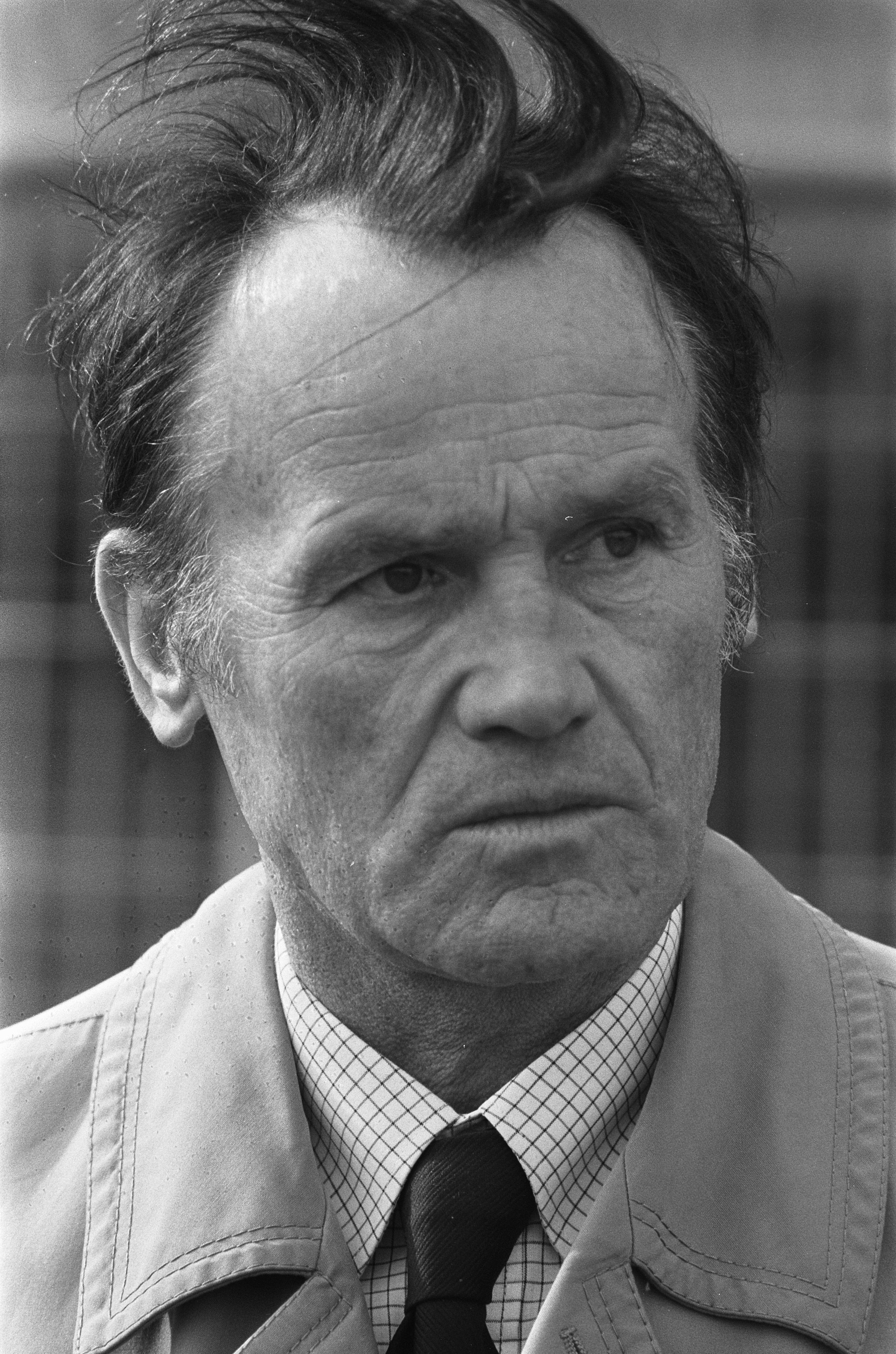
- Born: 20 December 1915; Gelsenkirchen, German Empire
- Died: 28 August 1995 (aged 79); Dülken, Germany
- Awards: Knight's Cross of the Iron Cross
Association football career
- Position: Defender
Senior career*
Years	Team	Apps	(Gls)
1945–1946	FC Schalke 04		
1948–1949	TSG Vohwinkel 80		
1948–1949	Rheydter SV		
1951–1953	Borussia Mönchengladbach		
Managerial career
- 1949–1951: Rheydter SV
- 1951–1953: Borussia Mönchengladbach
- 1954–1955: Waldhof Mannheim
- 1955–1956: VfR Frankenthal
- 1957–1960: Borussia Mönchengladbach
- 1960–1962: Fortuna Düsseldorf
- 1963–1965: Bayer 04 Leverkusen
- 1965–1967: Rot-Weiss Essen
- 1973–1974: Roda JC Kerkrade
- * Club domestic league appearances and goals

Fritz Pliska (20 December 1915 – 28 August 1995) was a German footballer and coach in the German Bundesliga and in the Dutch Eredivisie. During World War II, he served as an army soldier in the Wehrmacht and was a recipient of the Knight's Cross of the Iron Cross.

== Awards ==
- German Cross in Gold on 22 February 1942 as Oberfeldwebel in the 3./Panzer-Pionier-Bataillon
- Knight's Cross of the Iron Cross on 26 March 1944 as Oberfeldwebel and Zugführer (platoon leader) in the 3./Panzer-Pionier-Bataillon 19
