= Heinz Lowin =

German footballer (1938–1987)

Personal information
- Date of birth: 25 December 1938
- Date of death: 12 October 1987 (aged 48)
- Position: Defender

Youth career
- –1957: VfL Bochum

Senior career*
Years	Team	Apps	(Gls)
1957–1962	VfL Bochum	125	(2)
1962–1967	Borussia Mönchengladbach	136	(2)
1967–1969	VVV-Venlo	47	(0)

International career
1959	West Germany U23	3	(0)
- * Club domestic league appearances and goals

Heinz Lowin (25 December 1938 – 12 October 1987) was a German footballer who played as a defender.

== Career statistics ==
Appearances and goals by club, season and competition
Club	Season	League			Cup (Note: Includes DFB-Pokal, KNVB Cup.)		Total	
Club	Season	Division	Apps	Goals	Apps	Goals	Apps	Goals
VfL Bochum	1957–58	Oberliga West	24	1	—		24	1
VfL Bochum	1958–59	Oberliga West	24	0	—		24	0
VfL Bochum	1959–60	Oberliga West	25	1	—		25	1
VfL Bochum	1960–61	Oberliga West	26	0	0	0	26	0
VfL Bochum	1961–62	2. Oberliga West	26	0	—		26	0
VfL Bochum	Total		125	2	0	0	125	2
Borussia Mönchengladbach	1962–63	Oberliga West	28	0	—		28	0
Borussia Mönchengladbach	1963–64	Regionalliga West	38	1	1	0	39	1
Borussia Mönchengladbach	1964–65	Regionalliga West	31	1	—		31	1
Borussia Mönchengladbach	1965–66	Bundesliga	19	0	0	0	19	0
Borussia Mönchengladbach	1966–67	Bundesliga	20	0	1	0	21	0
Borussia Mönchengladbach	Total		136	2	2	0	138	2
VVV-Venlo	1967–68	Eerste Divisie	32	0				
VVV-Venlo	1968–69	Tweede Divisie	15	0				
VVV-Venlo	Total		47	0				
Career total			308	4				
