= Yannick Langesberg =

German footballer (born 1994)

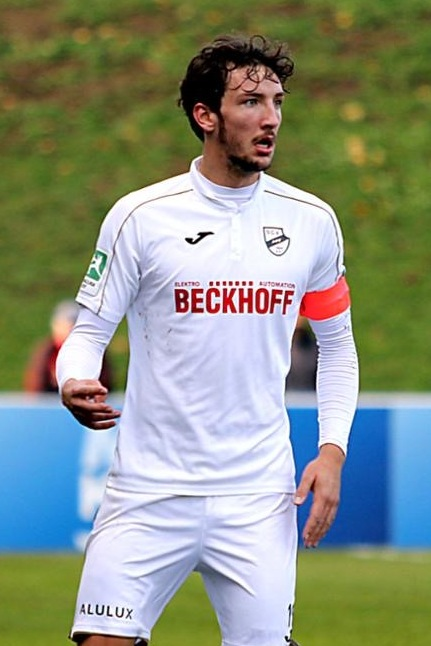
- Langesberg with SC Verl in 2019

Personal information
- Date of birth: 31 March 1994 (age 32)
- Place of birth: Wickede, Germany
- Height: 1.91 m (6 ft 3 in)
- Position: Defender

Team information
- Current team: TSV Steinbach Haiger
- Number: 13

Youth career
- –2012: SC Neheim
- 2012–2013: Borussia Dortmund

Senior career*
Years	Team	Apps	(Gls)
2013–2015	Rot Weiss Ahlen	24	(2)
2015–2019	SV Lippstadt	90	(2)
2019–2021	SC Verl	32	(1)
2021–2022	Rot-Weiss Essen	11	(0)
2022–	TSV Steinbach Haiger	35	(1)
- * Club domestic league appearances and goals as of 30 April 2024

Yannick Langesberg (born 31 March 1994) is a German professional footballer who plays as a defender for Regionalliga Südwest club TSV Steinbach Haiger.
