= Slađan Ašanin =

Croatian footballer

Personal information
- Date of birth: 13 August 1971 (age 55)
- Place of birth: Zagreb, SR Croatia, SFR Yugoslavia
- Height: 1.85 m (6 ft 1 in)
- Position: Defender

Senior career*
Years	Team	Apps	(Gls)
1993–1996	Inker Zaprešić		
1996–1998	Slavia Prague	51	(5)
1998–2004	Borussia Mönchengladbach	150	(14)
2004–2006	LR Ahlen	20	(2)
- * Club domestic league appearances and goals

Slađan Ašanin (born 13 August 1971) is a Croatian former professional footballer who played as a defender for several clubs in Europe.

== Club career ==
Born in Zagreb, Ašanin began his professional career with Inter Zaprešić. He spent two seasons with SK Slavia Praha in the Czech Gambrinus liga. In 1997, he won the Personality of the League award at the Czech Footballer of the Year awards. In 1998, he transferred to Borussia Mönchengladbach where he appeared in 150 Bundesliga matches.
