= Gerd vom Bruch =

German footballer and coach (1941–2026)

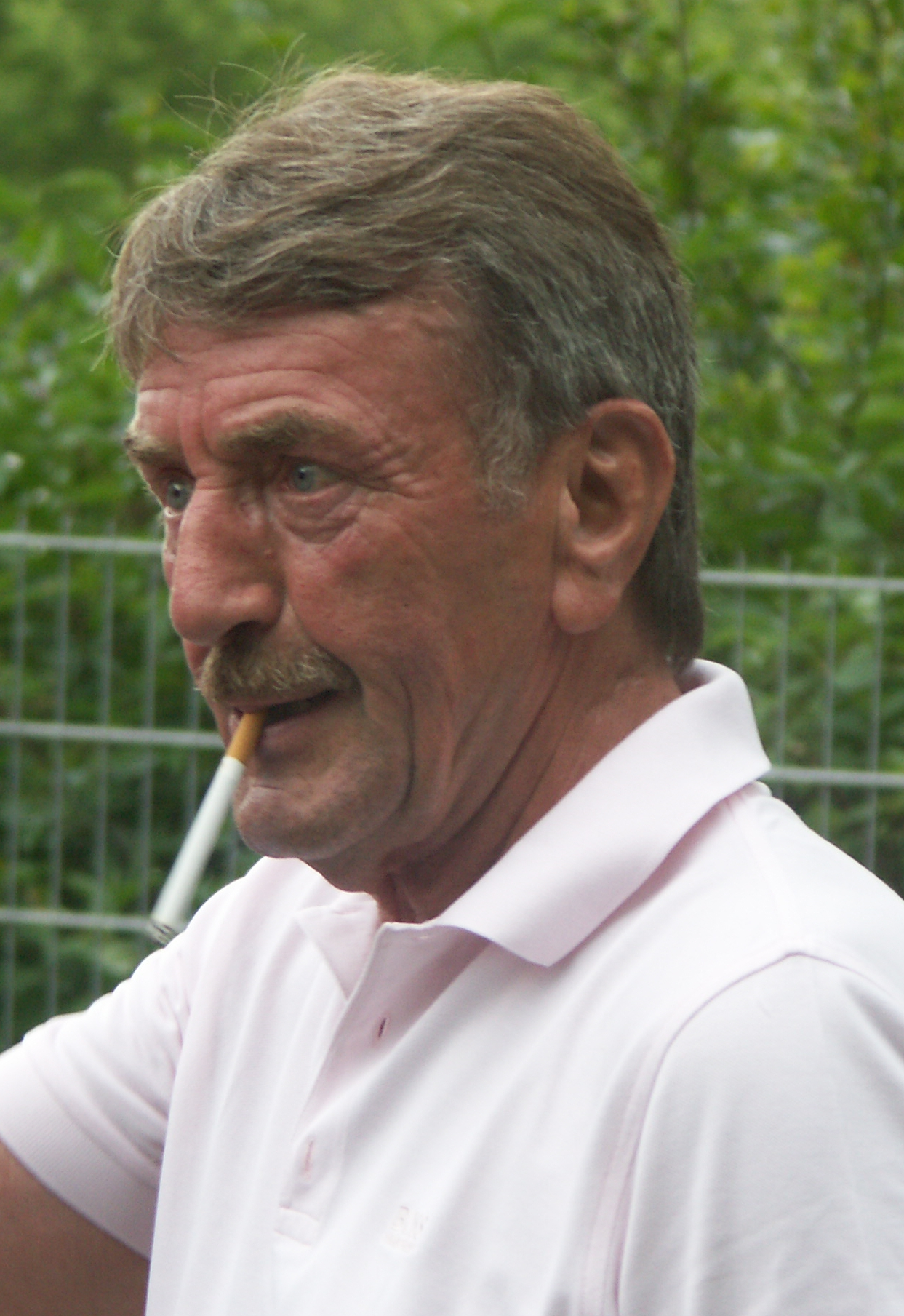
- Vom Bruch in 2011

Personal information
- Date of birth: 19 August 1941
- Date of death: 22 May 2026 (aged 84)
- Position: Midfielder

Senior career*
Years	Team	Apps	(Gls)
- Sportfreunde Siegen
- VfL Klafeld-Geisweid 08

Managerial career
- 1971–1976: SpVgg Olpe
- 1976–1980: SSV Dillenburg
- 1980–1985: Rot-Weiss Lüdenscheid
- 1985–1986: Eintracht Haiger
- 1986–1987: Sportfreunde Siegen
- 1987–1989: Borussia Mönchengladbach (assistant)
- 1989–1991: Borussia Mönchengladbach
- 1992–1993: Wuppertaler SV
- 1994–1996: Alemannia Aachen
- 1997–1998: Rot-Weiß Oberhausen
- * Club domestic league appearances and goals

Gerd vom Bruch (19 August 1941 – 22 May 2026) was a German football player and coach.

After working with lower-division clubs, he became an assistant coach at the Borussia Mönchengladbach in 1987. In 1989, he was promoted to head coach of the club, which was facing relegation from the Bundesliga, and managed to keep them in the league. He was fired in 1991, after which he went on to coach Wuppertaler SV, Alemannia Aachen, and Rot-Weiß Oberhausen.

After his last stint in Oberhausen in 1998, he worked as a player agent. Among his more notable clients were Marc-André ter Stegen, Marcell Jansen, Christoph Kramer, and Patrick Helmes.

Bruch died on 22 May 2026, at the age of 84.
