= 1983–84 VfB Stuttgart season =

VfB Stuttgart
1983–84 season
- Manager: Helmut Benthaus
- Stadium: Neckarstadion
- Bundesliga: 1st
- DFB-Pokal: Quarter-finals
- UEFA Cup: First round
- Top goalscorer: League: Peter Reichert (13 goals); All: Peter Reichert and Karl Allgöwer (15 goals)

During the 1983–84 German football season, VfB Stuttgart won the Bundesliga. It was the club's 7th consecutive season in the Bundesliga, having achieved promotion in 1977.

== Squad ==
Note: Flags indicate national team as defined under FIFA eligibility rules; some limited exceptions apply. Players may hold more than one non-FIFA nationality.

No.	Pos.	Nation	Player
—	GK	GER	Armin Jäger
—	GK	GER	Helmut Roleder
—	GK	GER	Rainer Zietsch
—	DF	GER	Thomas Kempe
—	DF	GER	Günther Schäfer
—	DF	GER	Karlheinz Förster
—	DF	GER	Guido Buchwald
—	DF	GER	Hans-Peter Makan
—	DF	GER	Bernd Förster
—	DF	GER	Kurt Niedermayer
—	MF	GER	Andreas Müller
—	MF	GER	Karl Allgöwer
—	MF	ISL	Ásgeir Sigurvinsson

No.	Pos.	Nation	Player
—	MF	GER	Hermann Ohlicher
—	FW	GER	Walter Kelsch
—	FW	GER	Peter Reichert
—	FW	SWE	Dan Corneliusson
—	FW	GER	Achim Glückler
—	FW	GER	Rudi Lorch

== Competitions ==
=== Bundesliga ===
==== Matches ====
13 August 1983 1	VfB Stuttgart	3–0	Eintracht Braunschweig	Stuttgart
15:30	Ohlicher 37', 77'; Reichert 87'			Stadium: Neckarstadion; Attendance: 25,000; Referee: Jakob Wippker

19 August 1983 2	1. FC Kaiserslautern	2–2	VfB Stuttgart	Kaiserslautern
20:00	Brehme 4' (pen.); Brummer 69'		Corneliusson 15'; Allgöwer 68'	Stadium: Betzenbergstadion; Attendance: 28,000; Referee: Karl-Josef Assenmacher

23 August 1983 3	VfB Stuttgart	0–0	Waldhof Mannheim	Stuttgart
20:00				Stadium: Neckarstadion; Attendance: 55,000; Referee: Walter Eschweiler

31 August 1983 4	Borussia Dortmund	0–3	VfB Stuttgart	Dortmund
20:00			Förster 30'; Niedermayer 48'; Corneliusson 72'	Stadium: Westfalenstadion; Attendance: 22,000; Referee: Volker Roth

3 September 1983 5	VfB Stuttgart	4–2	VfL Bochum	Stuttgart
15:30	Corneliusson 50', 84', 86'; Müller 78'		Benatelli 18'; Oswald 60'	Stadium: Neckarstadion; Attendance: 19,000; Referee: Friedrich Retzmann

10 September 1983 6	Bayer Uerdingen	3–2	VfB Stuttgart	Krefeld
15:30	Gulich 25'; Funkel 42' (pen.), 81' (pen.)		Corneliusson 28'; Schäfer 70'	Stadium: Grotenburg-Stadion; Attendance: 20,000; Referee: Wilfried Heitmann

17 September 1983 7	VfB Stuttgart	0–0	Borussia Mönchengladbach	Stuttgart
15:30				Stadium: Neckarstadion; Attendance: 20,400; Referee: Franz Gächter

24 September 1983 8	Bayer Leverkusen	1–1	VfB Stuttgart	Leverkusen
15:30	Röber 49' (pen.)		Allgöwer 58'	Stadium: Ulrich-Haberland-Stadion; Attendance: 12,800; Referee: Udo Horeis

1 October 1983 9	VfB Stuttgart	3–2	1. FC Köln	Stuttgart
15:30	Müller 37'; Niedermayer 63'; Allgöwer 80'		Allofs 79'; Fischer 85'	Stadium: Neckarstadion; Attendance: 29,000; Referee: Franz-Josef Hontheim

15 October 1983 10	Arminia Bielefeld	0–0	VfB Stuttgart	Bielefeld
15:30				Stadium: Bielefelder Alm; Attendance: 19,800; Referee: Werner Föckler

22 October 1983 11	VfB Stuttgart	1–0	Bayern Munich	Stuttgart
17:00	Kelsch 56'			Stadium: Neckarstadion; Attendance: 70.896; Referee: Karl-Heinz Tritschler

29 October 1983 12	Fortuna Düsseldorf	3–0	VfB Stuttgart	Düsseldorf
15:30	Zewe 12'; Thiele 27', 38'			Stadium: Rheinstadion; Attendance: 30,000; Referee: Friedrich Retzmann

5 November 1983 13	VfB Stuttgart	7–0	1. FC Nürnberg	Stuttgart
15:30	Allgöwer 46', 48', 87'; Schäfer 50'; Kelsch 66' (pen.); Sigurvinsson 73'; Kempe 75'			Stadium: Neckarstadion; Attendance: 17,000; Referee: Dieter Pauly

12 November 1983 14	Kickers Offenbach	1–2	VfB Stuttgart	Offenbach am Main
15:30	Trapp 38'		Niedermayer 47'; Sigurvinsson 80'	Stadium: Bieberer Berg; Attendance: 18,000; Referee: Wolf-Dieter Ahlenfelder

26 November 1983 15	Eintracht Frankfurt	1–3	VfB Stuttgart	Frankfurt
15:30	Svensson 12'		Allgöwer 16'; Sigurvinsson 54'; Reichert 70'	Stadium: Waldstadion; Attendance: 20,000; Referee: Aron Schmidhuber

3 December 1983 16	VfB Stuttgart	3–0	Werder Bremen	Stuttgart
15:30	Kelsch 62'; Allgöwer 69'; Reichert 78'			Stadium: Neckarstadion; Attendance: 34,700; Referee: Dieter Niebergall

7 December 1983 17	Hamburger SV	0–2	VfB Stuttgart	Hamburg
20:00			Corneliusson 68'; Allgöwer 88'	Stadium: Volksparkstadion; Attendance: 38,000; Referee: Walter Eschweiler

21 January 1984 18	Eintracht Braunschweig	1–0	VfB Stuttgart	Braunschweig
15:30	Kindermann 79'			Stadium: Eintracht-Stadion; Attendance: 18,000; Referee: Hans-Heinrich Barnick

28 January 1984 19	VfB Stuttgart	5–1	1. FC Kaiserslautern	Stuttgart
15:30	Corneliusson 18', 30', 79'; Reichert 55'; Sigurvinsson 90'		Allofs 89'	Stadium: Neckarstadion; Attendance: 19,000; Referee: Hans Wahmann

4 February 1984 20	Waldhof Mannheim	2–2	VfB Stuttgart	Ludwigshafen am Rhein
14:30	Walter 8'; Schön 37'		Corneliusson 47'; Reichert 83'	Stadium: Südweststadion; Attendance: 35,000; Referee: Rüdiger Wuttke

11 February 1984 21	VfB Stuttgart	3–1	Borussia Dortmund	Stuttgart
15:30	Reichert 37'; Ohlicher 44'; Förster 61'		Zorc 86' (pen.)	Stadium: Neckarstadion; Attendance: 17,400; Referee: Wolf-Günter Wiesel

10 March 1984 23	Borussia Mönchengladbach	2–0	VfB Stuttgart	Mönchengladbach
17:00	Bruns 53'; Mill 75'			Stadium: Bökelbergstadion; Attendance: 25,040; Referee: Wilfried Heitmann

16 March 1984 24	VfB Stuttgart	2–2	Bayer Leverkusen	Stuttgart
20:00	Reichert 18'; Allgöwer 66'		Zechel 53'; Bast 71'	Stadium: Neckarstadion; Attendance: 18,200; Referee: Wolf-Rüdiger Umbach

20 March 1984 22	VfB Stuttgart	4–0	Bayer Uerdingen	Stuttgart
20:00	Ohlicher 27'; Sigurvinsson 45' (pen.); Corneliusson 47'; Förster 88'			Stadium: Neckarstadion; Attendance: 18,500; Referee: Werner Föckler

24 March 1984 25	1. FC Köln	2–2	VfB Stuttgart	Cologne
15:30	Fischer 8', 32'		Reichert 38', 63'	Stadium: Müngersdorfer Stadion; Attendance: 15,000; Referee: Dieter Niebergall

31 March 1984 26	VfB Stuttgart	1–0	Arminia Bielefeld	Stuttgart
15:30	Buchwald 55'			Stadium: Neckarstadion; Attendance: 18,000; Referee: Heinz Werner

13 April 1984 28	VfB Stuttgart	6–0	Fortuna Düsseldorf	Stuttgart
20:00	Reichert 29'; Sigurvinsson 35' (pen.); Ohlicher 45', 56'; Buchwald 75'; Müller 79'			Stadium: Neckarstadion; Attendance: 34,900; Referee: Hans-Heinrich Barnick

21 April 1984 29	VfL Bochum	0–1	VfB Stuttgart	Bochum
15:30			Müller 9'	Stadium: Ruhrstadion; Attendance: 25,000; Referee: Franz-Josef Hontheim

27 April 1984 30	1. FC Nürnberg	0–6	VfB Stuttgart	Nuremberg
20:00			Allgöwer 11'; Ohlicher 16'; Sigurvinsson 40', 69'; Müller 73'; Reichert 90'	Stadium: Frankenstadion; Attendance: 18,000; Referee: Hans Wahmann

4 May 1984 31	VfB Stuttgart	5–1	Kickers Offenbach	Stuttgart
20:00	Makan 27'; Buchwald 32'; Reichert 36'; Sigurvinsson 54' (pen.), 82'		Trapp 63'	Stadium: Neckarstadion; Attendance: 36,500; Referee: Jakob Wippker

12 May 1984 32	VfB Stuttgart	2–2	Eintracht Frankfurt	Stuttgart
17:00	Reichert 8'; Allgöwer 21'		Berthold 85'; Müller 90'	Stadium: Neckarstadion

19 May 1984 33	Werder Bremen	1–2	VfB Stuttgart	Bremen
17:00	Möhlmann 72'		Sigurvinsson 62'; Ohlicher 82'	Stadium: Weserstadion

26 May 1984 34	VfB Stuttgart	0–1	Hamburger SV	Stuttgart
17:00			Milewski 85'	Stadium: Neckarstadion

=== DFB-Pokal ===
16 August 1983 First round	Mainz 05	0–1	VfB Stuttgart	Mainz
18:30			Buchwald 52'	Stadium: Bruchwegstadion; Attendance: 7,000; Referee: Gerhard Theobald

9 August 1983 Second round	1. FC Köln II	1–8	VfB Stuttgart	Cologne
14:00	Faust 65'		Allgöwer 1', 28' (pen.); Makan 25', 56'; Corneliusson 32'; Förster 84'; Zietsch 86'; Kempe 90'	Attendance: 4,500; Referee: Hans Wahmann

14 January 1984 Round of 16	VfB Stuttgart	1–1	Hamburger SV	Stuttgart
15:30	Buchwald 81'		Hartwig 27'	Stadium: Neckarstadion; Attendance: 54,000; Referee: Karl-Josef Assenmacher

31 January 1984 Round of 16 replay	Hamburger SV	3–4 (a.e.t.)	VfB Stuttgart	Hamburg
20:00	Rolff 34'; Hartwig 58'; Jakobs 101'		Reichert 1', 86'; Allgöwer 99'; Buchwald 109'	Stadium: Volksparkstadion; Attendance: 28,500; Referee: Dr. Dieter Stäglich

13 March 1984 Quarter-finals	Werder Bremen	1–0	VfB Stuttgart	Bremen
20:00	Sidka 90'			Stadium: Weserstadion; Attendance: 34,500; Referee: Dieter Pauly

=== UEFA Cup ===
14 September 1983 First round	VfB Stuttgart (West Germany)	1–1	(Bulgaria) Levski Sofia	Stuttgart
20:00	Kelsch 76'		Valchev 78'	Stadium: Neckarstadion; Attendance: 17,500; Referee: Ron Bridges (Wales)

28 September 1983 First round	Levski Sofia (Bulgaria)	1–0	VfB Stuttgart	Sofia
19:30	Valchev 89'			Stadium: Stadion Vasil Levski; Attendance: 65,000; Referee: Roger Schoeters (Belgium)
