= 1987–88 SV Werder Bremen season =

SV Werder Bremen
1987–88 season
- Manager: Otto Rehhagel
- Stadium: Weserstadion
- Bundesliga: 1st
- DFB-Pokal: Semi-finals
- UEFA Cup: Semi-finals
- Top goalscorer: League: Karl-Heinz Riedle (18 goals); All: Karl-Heinz Riedle (24 goals)

In the 1987-88 season, SV Werder Bremen won its second Bundesliga title, and reached the semi-finals of the DFB-Pokal and the UEFA Cup.

== Squad ==
Note: Flags indicate national team as defined under FIFA eligibility rules; some limited exceptions apply. Players may hold more than one non-FIFA nationality.

No.	Pos.	Nation	Player
—	GK	GER	Dieter Burdenski
—	GK	GER	Oliver Reck
—	DF	GER	Uli Borowka
—	DF	NOR	Rune Bratseth
—	DF	GER	Michael Kutzop
—	DF	GER	Jonny Otten
—	DF	GER	Matthias Ruländer
—	DF	GER	Gunnar Sauer
—	DF	GER	Thomas Schaaf
—	DF	GER	Thomas Wolter
—	MF	GER	Dieter Eilts
—	MF	GER	Günter Hermann
—	MF	GER	Norbert Meier
—	MF	GER	Benno Möhlmann
—	MF	GER	Miroslav Votava

No.	Pos.	Nation	Player
—	FW	GER	Manfred Burgsmüller
—	FW	GER	Frank Neubarth
—	FW	GER	Frank Ordenewitz
—	FW	GER	Karl-Heinz Riedle

== Competitions ==
=== Bundesliga ===
==== League table ====
Pos	Team	Pld	W	D	L	GF	GA	GD	Pts	Qualification or relegation
1	Werder Bremen (C)	34	22	8	4	61	22	+39	52	Qualification to European Cup first round
2	Bayern Munich	34	22	4	8	83	45	+38	48	Qualification to UEFA Cup first round (Note: Bayer Leverkusen won the UEFA Cup and thereby automatically qualified as title holders.)
3	1. FC Köln	34	18	12	4	57	28	+29	48	Qualification to UEFA Cup first round
4	VfB Stuttgart	34	16	8	10	69	49	+20	40	Qualification to UEFA Cup first round
5	1. FC Nürnberg	34	13	11	10	44	40	+4	37	Qualification to UEFA Cup first round

Source: www.dfb.de
Rules for classification: 1) points; 2) goal difference; 3) number of goals scored.
(C) Champions

==== Matches ====
13 August 1983 1	Stuttgart	3-0	Eintracht Braunschweig	Neckarstadion, Stuttgart
15:30	Ohlicher 37', 77'; Reichert 87'			Attendance: 25,000; Referee: Jakob Wippker

19 August 1983 2	Kaiserslautern	2–2	Stuttgart	Betzenbergstadion, Kaiserslautern
20:00	Brehme 4' (pen.); Brummer 69'		Corneliusson 15'; Allgöwer 68'	Attendance: 28,000; Referee: Karl-Josef Assenmacher

23 August 1983 3	Stuttgart	0-0	Waldhof Mannheim	Neckarstadion, Stuttgart
20:00				Attendance: 55,000; Referee: Walter Eschweiler

31 August 1983 4	Borussia Dortmund	0–3	Stuttgart	Westfalenstadion, Dortmund
20:00			Förster 30'; Niedermayer 48'; Corneliusson 72'	Attendance: 22,000; Referee: Volker Roth

3 September 1983 5	Stuttgart	4–2	Bochum	Neckarstadion, Stuttgart
15:30	Corneliusson 50', 84', 86'; Müller 78'		Benatelli 18'; Oswald 60'	Attendance: 19,000; Referee: Friedrich Retzmann

10 September 1983 6	Bayer Uerdingen	3–2	Stuttgart	Grotenburg-Kampfbahn, Krefeld
15:30	Gulich 25'; Funkel 42' (pen.), 81' (pen.)		Corneliusson 28'; Schäfer 70'	Attendance: 20,000; Referee: Wilfried Heitmann

17 September 1983 7	Stuttgart	0–0	Borussia Mönchengladbach	Neckarstadion, Stuttgart
15:30				Attendance: 20,400; Referee: Franz Gächter

24 September 1983 8	Bayer Leverkusen	1-1	Stuttgart	Ulrich-Haberland-Stadion, Leverkusen
15:30	Röber 49' (pen.)		Allgöwer 58'	Attendance: 12,800; Referee: Udo Horeis

1 October 1983 9	Stuttgart	3–2	Köln	Neckarstadion, Stuttgart
15:30	Müller 37'; Niedermayer 63'; Allgöwer 80'		Allofs 79'; Fischer 85'	Attendance: 29,000; Referee: Franz-Josef Hontheim

15 October 1983 10	Arminia Bielefeld	0-0	Stuttgart	Stadion Alm, Bielefeld
15:30				Attendance: 19,800; Referee: Werner Föckler

22 October 1983 11	Stuttgart	1-0	Bayern Munich	Neckarstadion, Stuttgart
17:00	Kelsch 56'			Attendance: 70.896; Referee: Karl-Heinz Tritschler

29 October 1983 12	Fortuna Düsseldorf	3-0	Stuttgart	Rheinstadion, Düsseldorf
15:30	Zewe 12'; Thiele 27', 38'			Attendance: 30,000; Referee: Friedrich Retzmann

5 November 1983 13	Stuttgart	7-0	Nürnberg	Neckarstadion, Stuttgart
15:30	Allgöwer 46', 48', 87'; Schäfer 50'; Kelsch 66' (pen.); Sigurvinsson 73'; Kempe 75'			Attendance: 17,000; Referee: Dieter Pauly

12 November 1983 14	Kickers Offenbach	1-2	Stuttgart	Bieberer Berg, Offenbach am Main
15:30	Trapp 38'		Niedermayer 47'; Sigurvinsson 80'	Attendance: 18,000; Referee: Wolf-Dieter Ahlenfelder

26 November 1983 15	Eintracht Frankfurt	1-3	Stuttgart	Waldstadion, Frankfurt
15:30	Svensson 12'		Allgöwer 16'; Sigurvinsson 54'; Reichert 70'	Attendance: 20,000; Referee: Aron Schmidhuber

3 December 1983 16	Stuttgart	3-0	Werder Bremen	Neckarstadion, Stuttgart
15:30	Kelsch 62'; Allgöwer 69'; Reichert 78'			Attendance: 34,700; Referee: Dieter Niebergall

7 December 1983 17	Hamburg	0-2	Stuttgart	Volksparkstadion, Hamburg
20:00			Corneliusson 68'; Allgöwer 88'	Attendance: 38,000; Referee: Walter Eschweiler

21 January 1984 18	Eintracht Braunschweig	1–0	Stuttgart	Eintracht-Stadion, Braunschweig
15:30	Kindermann 79'			Attendance: 18,000; Referee: Hans-Heinrich Barnick

28 January 1984 19	Stuttgart	5-1	Kaiserslautern	Neckarstadion, Stuttgart
15:30	Corneliusson 18', 30', 79'; Reichert 55'; Sigurvinsson 90'		Allofs 89'	Attendance: 19,000; Referee: Hans Wahmann

4 February 1984 20	Waldhof Mannheim	2-2	Stuttgart	Südweststadion, Ludwigshafen am Rhein
14:30	Walter 8'; Schön 37'		Corneliusson 47'; Reichert 83'	Attendance: 35,000; Referee: Rüdiger Wuttke

11 February 1984 21	Stuttgart	3-1	Borussia Dortmund	Neckarstadion, Stuttgart
15:30	Reichert 37'; Ohlicher 44'; Förster 61'		Zorc 86' (pen.)	Attendance: 17,400; Referee: Wolf-Günter Wiesel

10 March 1984 23	Borussia Mönchengladbach	2-0	Stuttgart	Bökelbergstadion, Mönchengladbach
17:00	Bruns 53'; Mill 75'			Attendance: 25,040; Referee: Wilfried Heitmann

16 March 1984 24	Stuttgart	2-2	Bayer Leverkusen	Neckarstadion, Stuttgart
20:00	Reichert 18'; Allgöwer 66'		Zechel 53'; Bast 71'	Attendance: 18,200; Referee: Wolf-Rüdiger Umbach

20 March 1984 22	Stuttgart	4-0	Bayer Uerdingen	Neckarstadion, Stuttgart
20:00	Ohlicher 27'; Sigurvinsson 45' (pen.); Corneliusson 47'; Förster 88'			Attendance: 18,500; Referee: Werner Föckler

24 March 1984 25	Köln	2-2	Stuttgart	Müngersdorfer Stadion, Cologne
15:30	Fischer 8', 32'		Reichert 38', 63'	Attendance: 15,000; Referee: Dieter Niebergall

31 March 1984 26	Stuttgart	1-0	Arminia Bielefeld	Neckarstadion, Stuttgart
15:30	Buchwald 55'			Attendance: 18,000; Referee: Heinz Werner

13 April 1984 28	Stuttgart	6-0	Fortuna Düsseldorf	Neckarstadion, Stuttgart
20:00	Reichert 29'; Sigurvinsson 35' (pen.); Ohlicher 45', 56'; Buchwald 75'; Müller 79'			Attendance: 34,900; Referee: Hans-Heinrich Barnick

23 April 1988 29	Nürnberg	0-0	Werder Bremen	Frankenstadion, Nuremberg
15:30				Attendance: 39,000; Referee: Bernd Kruse

30 April 1988 30	Werder Bremen	2-0	Borussia Mönchengladbach	Weserstadion, Bremen
15:30	Kutzop 76'; Riedle 81'			Attendance: 26,000; Referee: Peter Gabor

3 May 1988 31	Eintracht Frankfurt	0-1	Werder Bremen	Waldstadion, Frankfurt
20:00			Riedle 70'	Attendance: 27,000; Referee: Joachim Kautschor

7 May 1988 32	Köln	2-0	Werder Bremen	Müngersdorfer Stadion, Cologne

14 May 1988 33	Werder Bremen	1-4	Hamburg	Weserstadion, Bremen

21 May 1988 34	Schalke 04	1-4	Werder Bremen	Parkstadion, Gelsenkirchen

=== DFB-Pokal ===
28 August 1987 First round	TSV Verden	0-4	Werder Bremen	Stadion am Berliner Ring, Verden
19:30			Meier 34', 77'; Neubarth 60'; Ordenewitz 72'	Attendance: 12,000; Referee: Michael Malbranc

21 November 1987 Second round	Wolfsburg	4-5 (a.e.t.)	Werder Bremen	VfL-Stadion am Elsterweg, Wolfsburg
14:00	Plagge 79' (pen.); Ansorge 89'; Otto 90'; Fiebich 90'		Neubarth 40'; Ansorge 53' (o.g.); Kutzop 70' (pen.); Riedle 84'; Ordenewitz 101'	Attendance: 10,000; Referee: Manfred Schmidt

13 February 1988 Round of 16	1. FC Pforzheim	1–1 (a.e.t.)	Werder Bremen	Holzhof Stadion, Pforzheim
	Pfirrmann 69'		Bratseth 7'	Attendance: 11,500; Referee: Karl-Heinz Tritschler

24 February 1988 Round of 16 replay	SV Werder Bremen	3–1	1. FC Pforzheim	Weserstadion, Bremen
	Neubarth 19'; Ordenewitz 37'; Riedle 43'		Mähler 30'	Attendance: 5,000; Referee: Hellmut Krug

9 March 1988 Quarter-final	Viktoria Aschaffenburg	1–3	Werder Bremen	Stadion am Schönbusch, Aschaffenburg
	Lindenau 87'		Neubarth 7'; Votava 31'; Schaaf 55'	Attendance: 13,000; Referee: Hans-Jürgen Weber

13 April 1988 Semi-final	Werder Bremen	0–1	Eintracht Frankfurt	Weserstadion, Bremen
20:15			Schulz 45'	Attendance: 20,000; Referee: Dieter Pauly

=== UEFA Cup ===
==== First round ====
16 September 1987 First leg	Mjøndalen (Norway)	0–5	(West Germany) Werder Bremen	Nedre Eiken Stadion, Mjøndalen
			Riedle 6', 87'; Ordenewitz 52'; Sauer 55'; Wolter 64'	Attendance: 2,108; Referee: Simo Ruokonen (Finland)

30 September 1987 Second leg	Werder Bremen (West Germany)	0–1	(Norway) Mjøndalen	Weserstadion, Bremen
			Markussen 78'	Attendance: 12,000; Referee: Fred McKnight (Northern Ireland)

==== Second round ====
24 October 1987 First leg	Spartak Moscow (Soviet Union)	4–1	(West Germany) Werder Bremen	Central Lenin Stadium, Moscow
	Mostovoi 11'; Rodionov 36', 55'; Pasulko 90'		Burgsmüller 81'	Attendance: 65,000; Referee: Kurt Sørensen (Denmark)

3 November 1987 Second leg	Werder Bremen (Germany)	6–2 (a.e.t.)	(Soviet Union) Spartak Moscow	Weserstadion, Bremen
	Neubarth 4', 10'; Ordenewitz 25'; Sauer 78'; Riedle 101'; Burgsmüller 109'		Cherenkov 71'; Pasulko 110'	Attendance: 22,000; Referee: Georges Sandoz (Switzerland)

==== Third round ====
25 November 1987 First leg	Werder Bremen (West Germany)	2–1	(Soviet Union) Dinamo Tbilisi	Weserstadion, Bremen
	Neubarth 3'; Riedle 18'		Shengelia 20'	Attendance: 21,630; Referee: Ildefonso Urizar (Spain)

9 December 1987 Second leg	Dinamo Tbilisi (Soviet Union)	1–1	(West Germany) Werder Bremen	Lenin Dinamo Stadium, Tbilisi
	Sulakvelidze 31'		Schaaf 61'	Attendance: 80,000; Referee: Bo Karlsson (Sweden)

==== Quarter-finals ====
2 March 1988 First leg	Hellas Verona (Italy)	0–1	(West Germany) Werder Bremen	Stadio Marcantonio Bentegodi, Verona
20:45			Neubarth 49'	Attendance: 33,435; Referee: Bob Valentine (Scotland)

16 March 1988 Second leg	Werder Bremen (West Germany)	1–1	(Italy) Hellas Verona	Weserstadion, Bremen
	Sauer 32'		Volpecina 54'	Attendance: 39,000; Referee: Jan Keizer (Netherlands)

==== Semi-finals ====
6 April 1988 First leg	Bayer Leverkusen (West Germany)	1–0	(West Germany) Werder Bremen	Ulrich-Haberland-Stadion, Leverkusen
	Reinhardt 60'			Attendance: 17,000; Referee: Gerasimos Germanakos (Greece)

20 April 1988 Second leg	Werder Bremen (West Germany)	0–0	(West Germany) Bayer Leverkusen	Weserstadion, Bremen
				Attendance: 43,000; Referee: Henning Lund-Sørensen (Denmark)
