= List of VfB Stuttgart players =

VfB Stuttgart is a German sports club based in Stuttgart, Baden-Württemberg. The club is best known for its football team which is currently part of Germany's first division Bundesliga. VfB Stuttgart is one of Germany's most successful clubs. The club has won the national championship five times, most recently in 2006–07; the DFB-Pokal three times; and the UEFA Intertoto Cup a record three times.

== List of players ==
- Appearances and goals are for first-team competitive matches only, including Bundesliga, 2. Bundesliga, 2. Bundesliga Süd, DFB-Pokal, DFL-Supercup, DFL-Ligapokal, European Cup/Champions League, UEFA Cup/Europa League, Cup Winners' Cup and Intertoto Cup matches.

Statistics correct as of match played 9 June 2020

Table headers

- Nationality – If a player played international football, the country/countries he played for are shown. Otherwise, the player's nationality is given as their country of birth.
- VfB Stuttgart career – The year of the player's first appearance for Stuttgart to the year of his last appearance.
- Appearances – The total number of matches played, both as a starter and as a substitute.
- Goals – The total number of goals scored.

Positions key
GK	Goalkeeper
DF	Defender
MF	Midfielder
FW	Forward

List of VfB Stuttgart players with at least 100 appearances
Player	Nationality	Position	VfB Stuttgart career	Appearances	Goals	Ref.
Karl Allgöwer	Germany	MF	1980–1991	410	166	
Hans Arnold	Germany	DF	1963–1971	221	9	
Krasimir Balakov	Bulgaria	MF	1995–2003	298	73	
Timo Baumgartl	Germany	DF	2014–2019	121	2	
Thomas Berthold	Germany	DF	1993–2000	227	5	
Fredi Bobic	Germany	FW	1994–1999	182	86	
Arthur Boka	Ivory Coast	DF	2006–2014	207	7	
Marcelo Bordon	Brazil	DF	1999–2004	171	14	
Dieter Brenninger	Germany	DF	1972–1976	114	24	
Guido Buchwald	Germany	DF	1983–1994	387	45	
Andreas Buck	Germany	DF	1990–1997	185	12	
Cacau	Germany	FW	2003–2014	346	109	
Bradley Carnell	South Africa	DF	1998–2003	107	3	
Matthieu Delpierre	France	DF	2004–2012	215	5	
Slobodan Dubajić	Yugoslavia	DF	1991–1996	134	8	
Sean Dundee	Germany	DF	1999–2003	105	33	
Hans Eisele	Germany	DF	1958–1971	274	7	
Markus Elmer	Germany	DF	1973–1980	188	15	
Rudi Entenmann	Germany	MF	1961–1969	125	9	
Willi Entenmann	Germany	DF	1963–1976	277	33	
Hans Ettmayer	Germany	MF	1971–1975	114	39	
Fernando Meira	Portugal	DF	2002–2008	230	13	
Bernd Förster	Germany	DF	1978–1986	270	22	
Karlheinz Förster	Germany	DF	1977–1986	365	28	
Michael Frontzeck	Germany	DF	1989–1994	191	17	
Ionel Ganea	Romania	FW	1999–2003	138	47	
Maurizio Gaudino	Germany	MF	1987–1993	209	38	
Rolf Geiger	Germany	FW	1957–1962; 1963–1967	122	45	
Christian Gentner	Germany	MF	2004–2007; 2010–2019	373	50	
Heiko Gerber	Germany	DF	1999–2007	177	8	
Mario Gómez	Germany	FW	2003–2009; 2018–	228	109	
Gilbert Gress	France	MF	1966–1970	164	25	
Erwin Hadewicz	Germany	MF	1975–1983	271	20	
Karl-Heinz Handschuh	Germany	MF	1966–1974	209	72	
Martin Harnik	Austria	FW	2010–2016	214	68	
Jürgen Hartmann	Germany	MF	1985–1991	215	12	
Roland Hattenberger	Austria	MF	1977–1981	125	10	
Horst Haug	Germany	MF	1967–1973	149	34	
Gerhard Heinze	Germany	GK	1967–1975	219	0	
Roberto Hilbert	Germany	DF	2006–2010	153	22	
Timo Hildebrand	Germany	GK	1999–2007	296	0	
Andreas Hinkel	Germany	DF	2000–2006	206	3	
Thomas Hitzlsperger	Germany	MF	2005–2010	172	30	
Alexander Hleb	Belarus	MF	2000–2005; 2009–2010	221	21	
Dieter Hoeneß	Germany	FW	1975–1979	117	57	
Dragan Holcer	Yugoslavia	DF	1975–1981	214	5	
Dieter Höller	Germany	MF	1960–1966	131	52	
Vedad Ibišević	Bosnia and Herzegovina	FW	2012–2016	111	47	
Eike Immel	Germany	GK	1986–1995	340	0	
Emiliano Insúa	Argentina	DF	2015–2020	135	3	
Walter Kelsch	Germany	FW	1977–1984	251	65	
Sami Khedira	Germany	MF	2006–2010	132	16	
Jürgen Klinsmann	Germany	FW	1984–1989	186	94	
Ludwig Kögl	Germany	MF	1990–1996	152	16	
Horst Köppel	Germany	FW	1966–1968; 1971–1973	139	49	
Kevin Kurányi	Germany	FW	2001–2005	132	57	
Zdravko Kuzmanović	Switzerland	MF	2009–2013	127	22	
Krisztián Lisztes	Hungary	DF	1996–2001	146	15	
Ludovic Magnin	Switzerland	DF	2005–2009	134	2	
Ciprian Marica	Romania	FW	2007–2011	133	30	
Bernd Martin	Germany	DF	1973–1982	268	31	
Alexandru Maxim	Romania	MF	2013–2017	131	17	
Silvio Meißner	Germany	MF	2000–2008	232	30	
Gerd Menne	Germany	DF	1963–1969	132	8	
Cristian Molinaro	Italy	DF	2010–2014	124	0	
Andreas Müller	Germany	MF	1983–1987	129	14	
Hansi Müller	Germany	MF	1975–1982	224	81	
Georg Niedermeier	Germany	DF	2009–2016	182	14	
Hermann Ohlicher	Germany	MF	1973–1985	460	157	
Ricardo Osorio	Mexico	DF	2006–2010	101	1	
Eberhard Pfisterer	Germany	FW	1960–1967	106	9	
Gerhard Poschner	Romania	MF	1987–1990; 1994–1998	221	12	
Peter Reichert	Germany	FW	1981–1986	160	50	
Manfred Reiner	Germany	FW	1960–1967	118	37	
Helmut Roleder	Germany	GK	1972–1986	411	0	
Gōtoku Sakai	Japan	DF	2011–2015	106	2	
Günter Sawitzki	Germany	GK	1957–1971	234	0	
Arno Schäfer	Germany	DF	1973–1979	100	0	
Günther Schäfer	Germany	DF	1980–1996	399	0	
Bernd Schmider	Germany	MF	1975–1978; 1979–1980	134	11	
Thomas Schneider	Germany	DF	1991–2003	182	12	
Daniel Schwaab	Germany	DF	2013–2016	102	1	
Günter Seibold	Germany	DF	1958–1968	213	3	
Jochen Seitz	Germany	MF	2000–2003	108	10	
Klaus-Dieter Sieloff	Germany	DF	1960–1969	195	22	
Ásgeir Sigurvinsson	Iceland	MF	1982–1990	241	42	
Zvonimir Soldo	Croatia	DF	1996–2006	399	19	
Alexander Strehmel	Germany	DF	1986–1994	184	6	
Eyjólfur Sverrisson	Iceland	DF	1989–1994	120	23	
Serdar Tasci	Germany	DF	2006–2013	243	13	
Pablo Thiam	Guinea	MF	1998–2001	118	11	
Pablo Tiffert	Germany	MF	2000–2006	188	15	
Christian Träsch	Germany	DF	2008–2011	108	6	
Sven Ulreich	Germany	GK	2008–2015	220	0	
Frank Verlaat	Netherlands	DF	1995–1999	138	8	
Fritz Walter	Germany	FW	1987–1994	258	123	
Manfred Weidmann	Germany	DF	1967–1976	302	37	
Hartmut Weiß	Germany	FW	1964–1968; 1970–1971	118	44	
Timo Werner	Germany	FW	2013–2016	103	14	
Franz Wohlfahrt	Austria	GK	1996–2000	146	0	
Reinhold Zech	Germany	DF	1968–1975	224	5	
Rainer Zietsch	Germany	DF	1983–1989	160	7	
