= List of Bundesliga players =

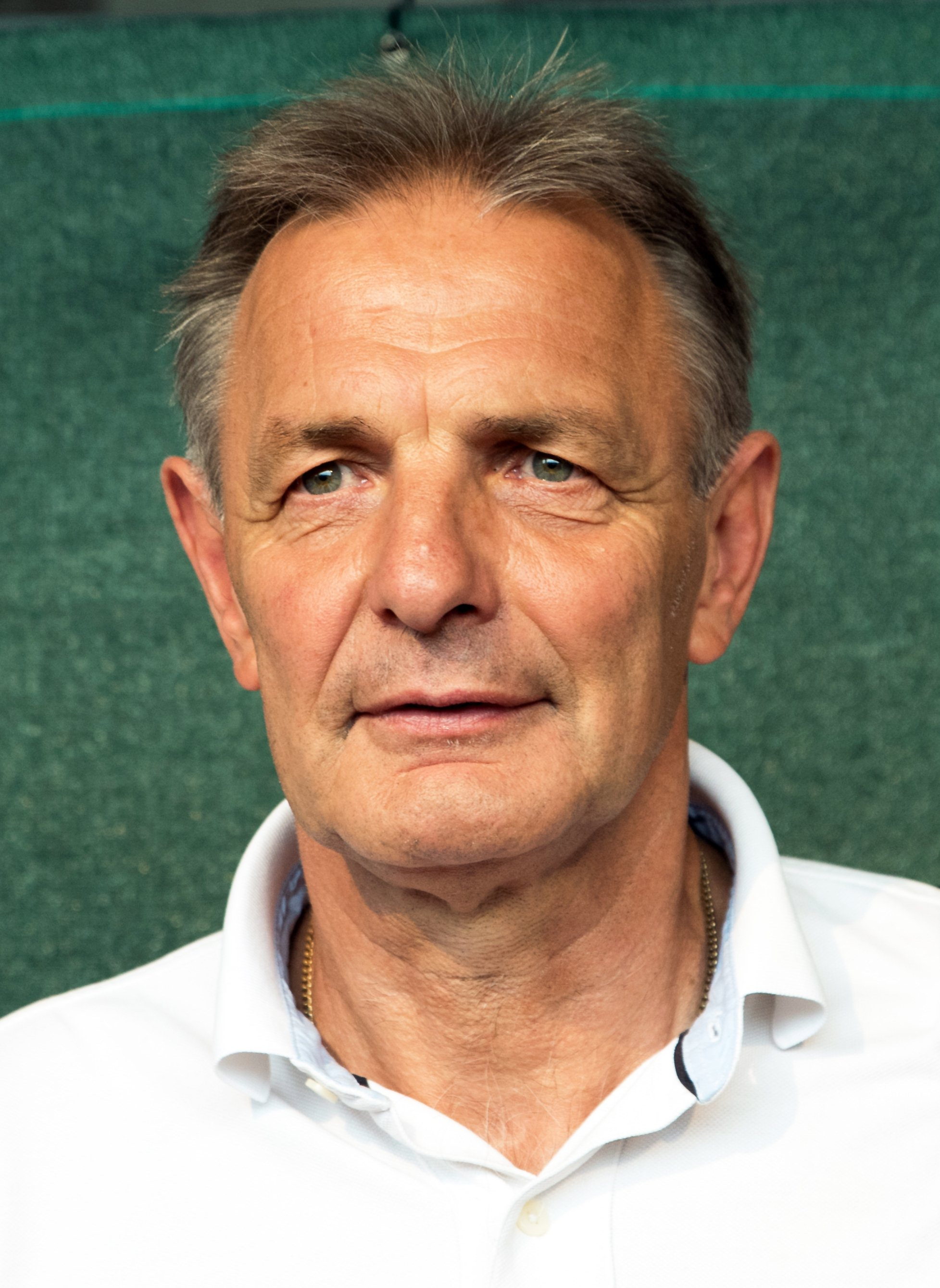
Charly Körbel has the most Bundesliga appearances.

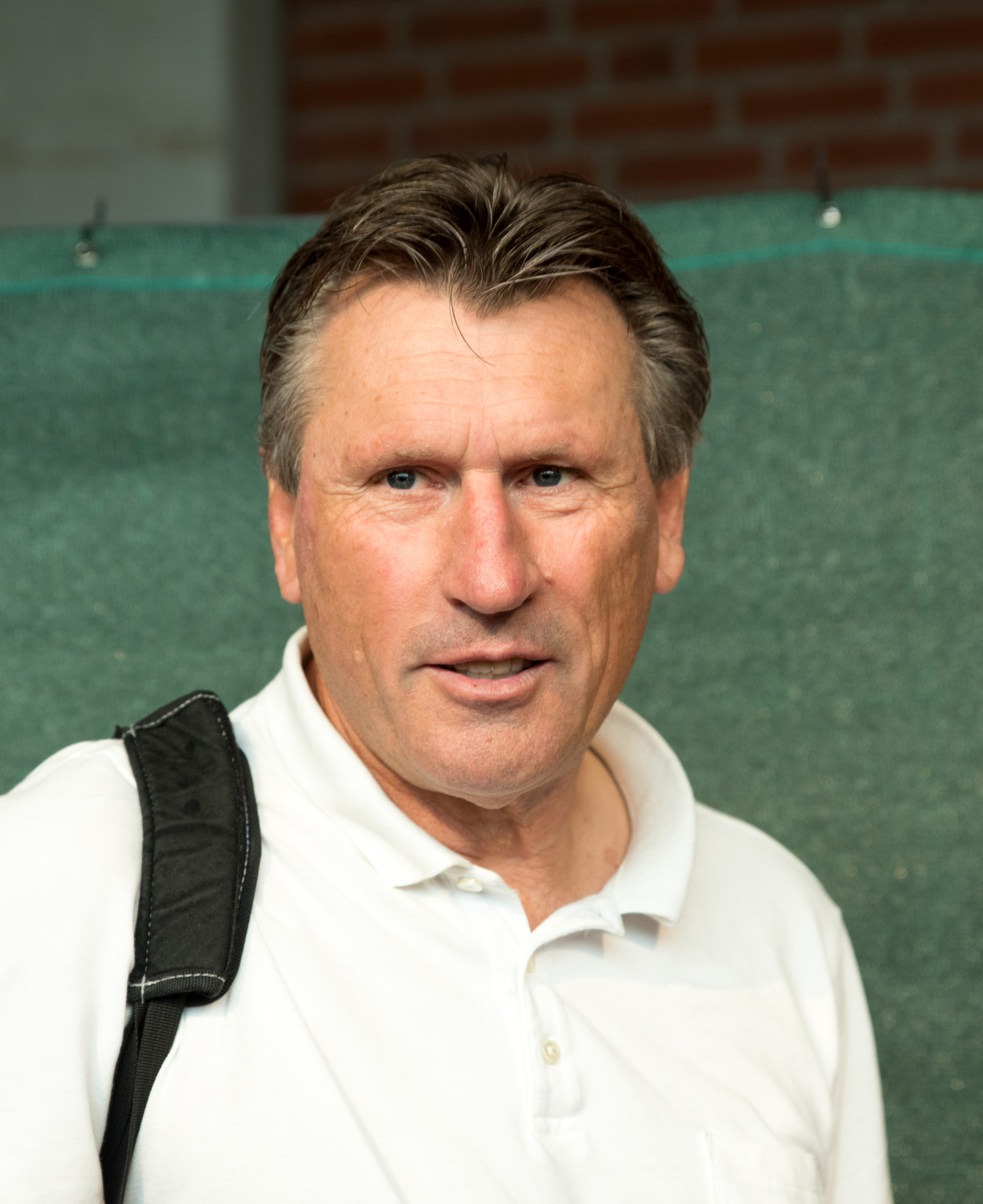
Manfred Kaltz has the second most Bundesliga appearances.

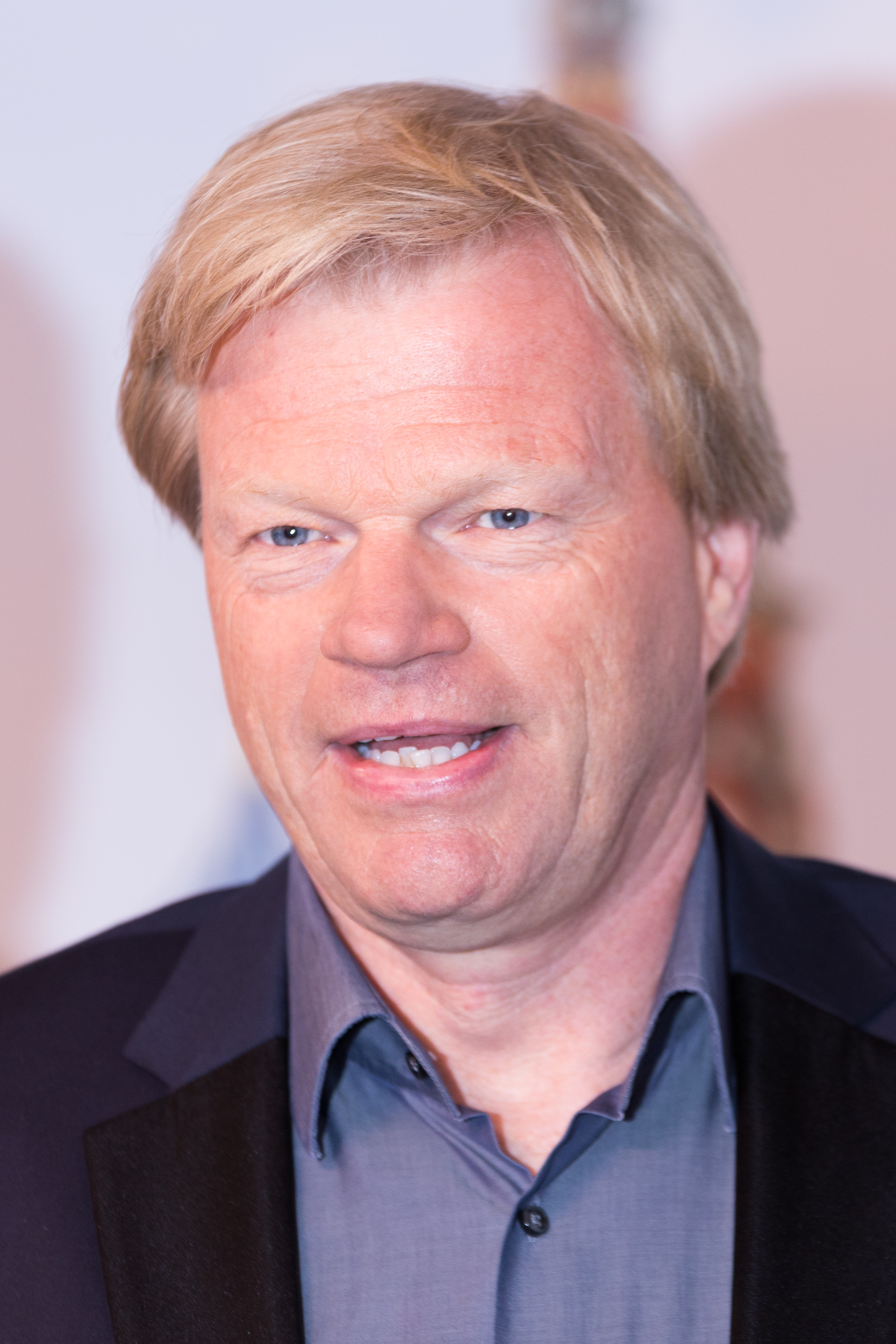
Oliver Kahn has the third most Bundesliga appearances.

These are lists of Bundesliga players who have made the most appearances in this league, which is the top level of the German football league system and started in 1963.

== Players with most Bundesliga appearances ==
- Position (Pos): GK = Goalkeeper, DF = Defender, MF = Midfielder, FW = Forward
- First / Last: year of first / last Bundesliga appearance
- Seasons (S): number of Bundesliga seasons in which the player made at least one appearance

Players are sorted by number of appearances, then by year of first appearance. Current Bundesliga players and their current clubs are shown in bold.

As of matches played 8 November 2026

Rank	Player	Nat	Pos	Apps	Goals	First	Last	S	Club(s)
1	Charly Körbel	(Germany)	DF	602	45	1972	1991	19	Frankfurt 602
2	Manfred Kaltz	(Germany)	DF	581	76	1971	1991	19	Hamburg 581
3	Oliver Kahn	(Germany)	GK	557	0	1987	2008	20	Bayern 429, Karlsruhe 128
4	Klaus Fichtel	(Germany)	DF	552	14	1965	1988	22	Schalke 477, Bremen 75
5	**Manuel Neuer**	(Germany)	GK	550	0	2006	2026	21	**Bayern** 394, Schalke 156
6	Miroslav Votava	(Germany)	MF	546	43	1976	1996	18	Bremen 357, Dortmund 189
7	Klaus Fischer	(Germany)	FW	535	268	1968	1988	19	Schalke 295, Köln 96, Bochum 84, 1860 Munich 60
8	Eike Immel	(Germany)	GK	534	0	1978	1995	17	Stuttgart 287, Dortmund 247
9	**Oliver Baumann**	(Germany)	GK	532	0	2010	2026	18	**Hoffenheim** 401, Freiburg 131
10	Willi Neuberger	(Germany)	DF	520	63	1966	1983	17	Frankfurt 267, Dortmund 148, Bremen 63, Wuppertal 42
11	Michael Lameck	(Germany)	MF	518	38	1972	1988	16	Bochum 518
12	Uli Stein	(Germany)	GK	512	0	1978	1997	17	Hamburg 228, Frankfurt 224, Bielefeld 60
13	Thomas Müller	(Germany)	MF	503	150	2008	2025	17	Bayern 503
14	Stefan Reuter	(Germany)	DF	502	25	1985	2004	18	Dortmund 307, Nürnberg 100, Bayern 95
15	Bernard Dietz	(Germany)	DF	495	77	1970	1986	16	Duisburg 394, Schalke 101
16	Ditmar Jakobs	(Germany)	DF	493	45	1972	1989	17	Hamburg 323, Duisburg 68, TeBe Berlin 63, Oberhausen 39
17	Claudio Pizarro	(Peru)	FW	490	197	1999	2020	20	Bremen 250, Bayern 224, Köln 16
18	Reiner Geye	(Germany)	FW	485	113	1971	1986	15	Kaiserslautern 290, Düsseldorf 195
19	Dieter Burdenski	(Germany)	GK	478	1	1970	1988	17	Bremen 444, Bielefeld 31, Schalke 3
20	Sepp Maier	(Germany)	GK	473	0	1965	1979	14	Bayern 473
21	Oliver Reck	(Germany)	GK	471	1	1984	2002	17	Bremen 345, Schalke 112, Offenbach 14
22	Christian Wörns	(Germany)	DF	469	28	1989	2008	17	Dortmund 240, Leverkusen 211, Mannheim 18
23	Toni Schumacher	(Germany)	GK	464	0	1973	1996	17	Köln 422, Schalke 33, Bayern 8, Dortmund 1
23	Lothar Matthäus	(Germany)	MF	464	121	1979	2000	17	Bayern 302, M’gladbach 162
25	Michael Zorc	(Germany)	MF	463	131	1981	1998	17	Dortmund 463
26	Franz-Josef Tenhagen	(Germany)	DF	457	25	1971	1988	16	Bochum 306, Dortmund 87, Oberhausen 64
27	Norbert Nigbur	(Germany)	GK	456	0	1966	1982	16	Schalke 355, Hertha 101
28	Rolf Rüssmann	(Germany)	DF	453	48	1969	1985	16	Schalke 304, Dortmund 149
28	Richard Golz	(Germany)	GK	453	0	1987	2005	17	Hamburg 273, Freiburg 180
30	Stefan Kuntz	(Germany)	FW	449	179	1983	1999	15	Kaiserslautern 170, Bochum 120, Uerdingen 94, Bielefeld 65
31	Manfred Burgsmüller	(Germany)	FW	447	213	1969	1990	17	Dortmund 224, Bremen 115, Essen 74, Nürnberg 34
32	Olaf Thon	(Germany)	MF	443	82	1984	2002	18	Schalke 295, Bayern 148
33	Mats Hummels	(Germany)	DF	442	33	2007	2024	18	Dortmund 367, Bayern 75
34	Jürgen Grabowski	(Germany)	MF	441	109	1965	1980	15	Frankfurt 441
34	Johannes Riedl	(Germany)	MF	441	49	1968	1984	16	Kaiserslautern 215, Duisburg 120, Hertha 52, Bielefeld 45, Offenbach 9
36	Gerd Zewe	(Germany)	MF	440	42	1972	1987	15	Düsseldorf 440
37	Michael Frontzeck	(Germany)	DF	436	37	1983	1999	15	M’gladbach 213, Stuttgart 163, Freiburg 32, Bochum 28
38	Wolfgang Kleff	(Germany)	GK	433	0	1968	1986	16	M’gladbach 321, Düsseldorf 59, Hertha 33, Bochum 20
39	Christian Gentner	(Germany)	MF	430	46	2005	2021	16	Stuttgart 278, Wolfsburg 99, Union 53
40	Andreas Möller	(Germany)	MF	429	110	1986	2004	17	Dortmund 228, Frankfurt 115, Schalke 86
41	Gerd Müller	(Germany)	FW	427	365	1965	1979	14	Bayern 427
42	Bernd Nickel	(Germany)	MF	426	141	1968	1983	16	Frankfurt 426
42	Frank Rost	(Germany)	GK	426	1	1995	2011	15	Hamburg 149, Bremen 147, Schalke 130
44	Franz Beckenbauer	(Germany)	DF	424	44	1965	1982	14	Bayern 396, Hamburg 28
44	Klaus Allofs	(Germany)	FW	424	177	1975	1993	15	Köln 177, Düsseldorf 169, Bremen 78
46	Sigfried Held	(Germany)	FW	422	72	1965	1981	14	Dortmund 230, Offenbach 133, Uerdingen 59
47	Gonzalo Castro	(Germany)	MF	421	38	2005	2022	17	Leverkusen 286, Dortmund 72, Stuttgart 51, Bielefeld 12
47	**Matthias Ginter**	(Germany)	DF	421	25	2012	2026	16	**Freiburg** 200, M’gladbach 154, Dortmund 67
49	Horst-Dieter Höttges	(Germany)	DF	420	55	1964	1978	14	Bremen 420
49	Bernd Hölzenbein	(Germany)	FW	420	160	1967	1981	14	Frankfurt 420
49	Lothar Woelk	(Germany)	DF	420	30	1977	1992	13	Bochum 385, Duisburg 35
52	Heinz Simmet	(Germany)	MF	419	55	1964	1978	14	Köln 357, Essen 33, Neunkirchen 29
52	Berti Vogts	(Germany)	DF	419	33	1965	1979	14	M’gladbach 419
52	Franz Merkhoffer	(Germany)	DF	419	23	1968	1983	14	Braunschweig 419
55	Rudi Bommer	(Germany)	MF	417	54	1976	1996	16	Düsseldorf 264, Uerdingen 83, Frankfurt 70
56	Georg Schwarzenbeck	(Germany)	DF	416	21	1966	1979	14	Bayern 416
56	Holger Fach	(Germany)	DF	416	67	1981	1997	17	Düsseldorf 171, M'gladbach 102, Uerdingen 101, Leverkusen 32, 1860 Munich 10
58	Dieter Bast	(Germany)	DF	412	54	1970	1985	14	Bochum 192, Duisburg 149, Leverkusen 71
59	Georg Volkert	(Germany)	FW	410	125	1965	1981	14	Hamburg 214, Nürnberg 136, Stuttgart 60
59	Marcel Witeczek	(Germany)	MF	410	50	1986	2003	15	Uerdingen 142, M’gladbach 103, Bayern 97, Kaiserslautern 68
61	Wolfgang Overath	(Germany)	MF	409	83	1963	1977	14	Köln 409
62	Rudi Kargus	(Germany)	GK	408	0	1971	1987	15	Hamburg 254, Nürnberg 119, Düsseldorf 20, Karlsruhe 15
63	Pierre Littbarski	(Germany)	MF	406	116	1978	1993	14	Köln 406
64	Michael Bella	(Germany)	DF	405	13	1965	1978	14	Duisburg 405
64	Karlheinz Geils	(Germany)	DF	405	23	1974	1989	15	Bremen 132, Bielefeld 131, Köln 81, Hannover 61
66	Klaus Augenthaler	(Germany)	DF	404	52	1977	1991	14	Bayern 404
67	Winfried Schäfer	(Germany)	MF	403	46	1969	1985	16	M’gladbach 210, Offenbach 125, Karlsruhe 68
67	Stefan Kießling	(Germany)	FW	403	144	2003	2018	15	Leverkusen 344, Nürnberg 59
69	Torsten Frings	(Germany)	MF	402	49	1997	2011	15	Bremen 326, Dortmund 47, Bayern 29
70	Rüdiger Vollborn	(Germany)	GK	401	0	1983	1999	15	Leverkusen 401
70	Martin Kree	(Germany)	DF	401	51	1984	1998	15	Bochum 164, Leverkusen 156, Dortmund 81
72	Klaus Zaczyk	(Germany)	MF	400	61	1963	1978	15	Hamburg 262, Karlsruhe 104, Nürnberg 34
72	Thomas Häßler	(Germany)	MF	400	68	1984	2003	15	Köln 149, Karlsruhe 118, 1860 Munich 115, Dortmund 18
72	Maximilian Arnold	(Germany)	MF	400	45	2011	2026	15	Wolfsburg 400
75	Gerhard Heinze	(Germany)	GK	398	0	1968	1982	15	Duisburg 205, Stuttgart 193
75	Jürgen Kohler	(Germany)	DF	398	28	1984	2002	15	Dortmund 191, Mannheim 95, Köln 57, Bayern 55
77	Martin Max	(Germany)	FW	396	126	1989	2004	15	M’gladbach 142, 1860 Munich 112, Schalke 109, Rostock 33
78	Jens Lehmann	(Germany)	GK	394	2	1991	2010	14	Schalke 200, Dortmund 129, Stuttgart 65
79	Mehmet Scholl	(Germany)	MF	392	98	1990	2007	18	Bayern 334, Karlsruhe 58
80	Werner Görts	(Germany)	FW	391	74	1965	1978	13	Bremen 363, Neunkirchen 28
80	Thomas Kempe	(Germany)	DF	391	42	1979	1993	14	Bochum 234, Duisburg 88, Stuttgart 69
80	Marco Reus	(Germany)	MF	391	156	2009	2024	15	Dortmund 294, M’gladbach 97
83	Uwe Kamps	(Germany)	GK	390	0	1983	2004	16	M’gladbach 390
83	Thomas Helmer	(Germany)	DF	390	41	1985	1999	15	Bayern 191, Dortmund 190, Hertha 5, Bielefeld 4
83	Dieter Eilts	(Germany)	MF	390	7	1986	2001	16	Bremen 390
86	Uli Borowka	(Germany)	DF	388	19	1982	1995	15	Bremen 239, M’gladbach 149
87	Frank Mill	(Germany)	FW	387	123	1976	1996	15	Dortmund 187, M’gladbach 153, Düsseldorf 28, Essen 19
87	Walter Oswald	(Germany)	DF	387	26	1977	1991	14	Bochum 353, St. Pauli 34
87	Hans-Jörg Butt	(Germany)	GK	387	26	1997	2012	14	Leverkusen 191, Hamburg 133, Bayern 63
90	Ralf Falkenmayer	(Germany)	MF	385	37	1981	1996	16	Frankfurt 337, Leverkusen 48
90	Philipp Lahm	(Germany)	DF	385	14	2003	2017	14	Bayern 332, Stuttgart 53
92	Makoto Hasebe	(Japan)	MF	384	7	2008	2024	17	Frankfurt 235, Wolfsburg 135, Nürnberg 14
92	Robert Lewandowski	(Poland)	FW	384	312	2010	2022	12	Bayern 253, Dortmund 131
94	Julian Brandt	(Germany)	MF	383	77	2014	2026	13	Dortmund 218, Leverkusen 165
95	Hannes Löhr	(Germany)	FW	381	166	1964	1977	14	Köln 381
96	Ronnie Worm	(Germany)	FW	380	119	1972	1985	13	Duisburg 231, Braunschweig 149
97	Michael Sziedat	(Germany)	DF	379	16	1971	1984	13	Hertha 280, Frankfurt 99
97	Martin Schneider	(Germany)	MF	379	10	1987	2000	13	M’gladbach 266, Nürnberg 90, Duisburg 23
97	Marco Bode	(Germany)	MF	379	101	1989	2002	13	Bremen 379
100	Thomas Allofs	(Germany)	FW	378	148	1978	1992	14	Düsseldorf 182, Kaiserslautern 126, Köln 70
100	Thomas von Heesen	(Germany)	MF	378	100	1980	1997	15	Hamburg 368, Bielefeld 10
102	Lars Stindl	(Germany)	MF	376	85	2008	2023	15	M’gladbach 222, Hannover 131, Karlsruhe 23
103	Bernd Dürnberger	(Germany)	MF	375	38	1972	1985	13	Bayern 375
104	Werner Melzer	(Germany)	MF	374	31	1974	1986	12	Kaiserslautern 374
105	Günther Schäfer	(Germany)	DF	373	9	1980	1998	18	Stuttgart 331, Bielefeld 42
106	Daniel Caligiuri	(Germany)	MF	372	51	2009	2023	14	Schalke 108, Wolfsburg 97, Freiburg 93, Augsburg 74
107	Stefan Effenberg	(Germany)	MF	370	71	1987	2003	14	M’gladbach 191, Bayern 160, Wolfsburg 19
107	Mike Büskens	(Germany)	MF	370	20	1989	2002	13	Schalke 257, Düsseldorf 101, Duisburg 12
107	**Christian Günter**	(Germany)	DF	370	13	2012	2026	13	**Freiburg** 370
110	Jupp Heynckes	(Germany)	FW	369	220	1965	1978	13	M’gladbach 283, Hannover 86
111	Thorsten Fink	(Germany)	MF	367	40	1990	2003	14	Bayern 150, Wattenscheid 125, Karlsruhe 92
112	Herbert Wimmer	(Germany)	MF	366	51	1966	1978	12	M’gladbach 366
112	Hans-Günter Bruns	(Germany)	DF	366	63	1975	1990	15	M’gladbach 331, Schalke 20, Düsseldorf 15
114	Jürgen Hartmann	(Germany)	MF	363	17	1985	1997	12	Hamburg 189, Stuttgart 174
114	Michael Tarnat	(Germany)	DF	363	24	1991	2009	16	Bayern 122, Hannover 102, Karlsruhe 81, Duisburg 58
116	Karl-Heinz Kamp	(Germany)	DF	361	26	1970	1984	13	Bremen 361
116	Wolfgang Seel	(Germany)	FW	361	79	1971	1986	12	Düsseldorf 274, Kaiserslautern 65, Saarbrücken 22
118	Horst Heldt	(Germany)	MF	359	36	1990	2005	14	Köln 130, 1860 Munich 111, Frankfurt 64, Stuttgart 54
119	Karl-Heinz Handschuh	(Germany)	MF	358	86	1966	1980	14	Stuttgart 185, Braunschweig 173
119	Jörg Neun	(Germany)	MF	358	18	1985	1999	15	M’gladbach 257, Mannheim 48, Duisburg 47, Nürnberg 6
119	Christian Schulz	(Germany)	DF	358	23	2003	2016	14	Hannover 255, Bremen 103
119	Naldo	(Brazil)	DF	358	46	2005	2018	13	Bremen 173, Wolfsburg 125, Schalke 60
119	Sebastian Rudy	(Germany)	MF	358	17	2008	2023	15	Hoffenheim 295, Bayern 25, Schalke 23, Stuttgart 15
124	Wolfgang Weber	(Germany)	DF	356	21	1963	1977	14	Köln 356
124	Wolfgang Rolff	(Germany)	MF	356	47	1982	1995	12	Hamburg 129, Leverkusen 99, Karlsruhe 94, Uerdingen 20, Köln 14
126	Roman Weidenfeller	(Germany)	GK	355	0	2000	2018	18	Dortmund 349, Kaiserslautern 6
127	Kevin Vogt	(Germany)	DF	353	4	2009	2025	14	Hoffenheim 193, Augsburg 56, Köln 55, Union 34, Bremen 14, Bochum 1
128	Harald Konopka	(Germany)	DF	352	21	1971	1984	13	Köln 335, Dortmund 17
129	Reiner Hollmann	(Germany)	DF	351	33	1970	1984	12	Braunschweig 259, Oberhausen 92
129	Jürgen Groh	(Germany)	DF	351	7	1976	1989	12	Kaiserslautern 197, Hamburg 154
129	Markus Schupp	(Germany)	MF	351	40	1985	1997	13	Kaiserslautern 177, Bayern 91, Wattenscheid 37, Frankfurt 30, Hamburg 16
129	Levan Kobiashvili	(Georgia (country))	MF	351	32	1998	2014	13	Schalke 168, Freiburg 121, Hertha 62
129	Halil Altıntop	(Turkey)	FW	351	67	2003	2017	12	Augsburg 115, Schalke 96, Kaiserslautern 91, Frankfurt 49
129	Patrick Herrmann	(Germany)	MF	351	47	2010	2024	15	M’gladbach 351
135	Ulf Kirsten	(Germany)	FW	350	181	1990	2003	13	Leverkusen 350
136	Paul Steiner	(Germany)	DF	349	27	1979	1990	12	Köln 291, Duisburg 58
136	Manfred Binz	(Germany)	DF	349	26	1985	1998	14	Frankfurt 336, Dortmund 13
138	Fritz Walter	(Germany)	FW	348	157	1983	1996	12	Stuttgart 216, Mannheim 129, Bielefeld 3
139	Andreas Köpke	(Germany)	GK	346	2	1986	1999	11	Nürnberg 280, Frankfurt 66
140	Bernd Franke	(Germany)	GK	345	0	1971	1985	12	Braunschweig 345
141	Vedad Ibišević	(Bosnia and Herzegovina)	FW	344	127	2006	2020	14	Hertha 138, Hoffenheim 92, Stuttgart 86, Aachen 24, Schalke 4
141	**Mario Götze**	(Germany)	MF	344	66	2009	2026	16	Dortmund 158, **Frankfurt** 113, Bayern 73
143	Heinz Flohe	(Germany)	MF	343	81	1966	1979	14	Köln 329, 1860 Munich 14
143	Hanno Balitsch	(Germany)	MF	343	20	2001	2014	13	Hannover 150, Leverkusen 96, Nürnberg 59, Köln 24, Mainz 14
145	Erich Beer	(Germany)	MF	342	95	1968	1979	11	Hertha 253, Essen 64, Nürnberg 25
145	Bastian Schweinsteiger	(Germany)	MF	342	45	2002	2015	13	Bayern 342
147	Bernhard Cullmann	(Germany)	MF	341	29	1970	1983	13	Köln 341
147	Thomas Linke	(Germany)	DF	341	15	1992	2005	13	Schalke 175, Bayern 166
147	**Jonathan Tah**	(Germany)	DF	341	17	2013	2026	13	Leverkusen 291, **Bayern** 34, Hamburg 16
150	Christian Hochstätter	(Germany)	MF	339	55	1982	1998	16	M’gladbach 339
151	Jupp Kapellmann	(Germany)	DF	338	36	1968	1981	13	Bayern 165, Köln 91, Aachen 42, 1860 Munich 40
151	Karl Allgöwer	(Germany)	MF	338	129	1980	1991	11	Stuttgart 338
151	Andreas Müller	(Germany)	MF	338	32	1983	2000	14	Schalke 200, Stuttgart 111, Hannover 27
154	Detlef Pirsig	(Germany)	DF	336	9	1966	1977	12	Duisburg 336
154	Manfred Bockenfeld	(Germany)	DF	336	34	1981	1994	13	Düsseldorf 178, Bremen 94, Mannheim 64
154	Zé Roberto	(Brazil)	MF	336	38	1998	2011	12	Bayern 169, Leverkusen 113, Hamburg 54
154	**Dominik Kohr**	(Germany)	MF	336	13	2012	2026	16	**Mainz** 158, Augsburg 91, Leverkusen 54, Frankfurt 33
158	Claus Reitmaier	(Germany)	GK	335	0	1991	2004	12	Wolfsburg 163, Karlsruhe 130, Stuttg. Kickers 30, Kaiserslautern 7, M'gladbach 5
159	Guido Buchwald	(Germany)	DF	334	28	1983	1998	12	Stuttgart 325, Karlsruhe 9
159	Jens Nowotny	(Germany)	DF	334	11	1992	2006	15	Leverkusen 231, Karlsruhe 103
159	Oliver Neuville	(Germany)	FW	334	91	1997	2010	12	Leverkusen 165, M’gladbach 119, Rostock 50
162	Wolfgang Sidka	(Germany)	MF	333	44	1972	1986	12	Hertha 184, Bremen 115, 1860 Munich 34
162	Ewald Lienen	(Germany)	FW	333	49	1977	1992	11	M’gladbach 244, Bielefeld 60, Duisburg 29
162	Carsten Ramelow	(Germany)	MF	333	22	1996	2007	13	Leverkusen 333
165	Thomas Hörster	(Germany)	DF	332	16	1979	1991	12	Leverkusen 332
165	Thomas Berthold	(Germany)	DF	332	22	1983	2000	13	Stuttgart 191, Frankfurt 111, Bayern 30
165	Rafinha	(Brazil)	DF	332	12	2005	2019	13	Bayern 179, Schalke 153
165	Łukasz Piszczek	(Poland)	DF	332	19	2007	2021	14	Dortmund 264, Hertha 68
165	**Joshua Kimmich**	(Germany)	MF	332	32	2015	2026	12	**Bayern** 332
170	Christian Schreier	(Germany)	FW	331	106	1981	1992	11	Leverkusen 203, Bochum 98, Düsseldorf 30
170	Clemens Fritz	(Germany)	DF	331	7	2003	2017	13	Bremen 288, Leverkusen 43
172	Frank Greiner	(Germany)	MF	330	19	1987	2002	15	Köln 176, Wolfsburg 127, Kaiserslautern 22, Nürnberg 5
172	Sergej Barbarez	(Bosnia and Herzegovina)	FW	330	95	1996	2008	12	Hamburg 174, Leverkusen 61, Rostock 59, Dortmund 36
174	**Andrej Kramarić**	(Croatia)	FW	329	141	2016	2026	12	**Hoffenheim** 329
175	Thomas Brunner	(Germany)	DF	328	18	1980	1994	13	Nürnberg 328
175	Bruno Labbadia	(Germany)	FW	328	103	1987	2000	12	Bayern 82, Kaiserslautern 67, Bremen 63, Hamburg 41, Köln 41, Bielefeld 34
175	Mario Gómez	(Germany)	FW	328	170	2004	2019	13	Stuttgart 168, Bayern 115, Wolfsburg 45
178	Wolfgang Kraus	(Germany)	MF	327	47	1972	1986	14	Frankfurt 189, Bayern 138
178	Leon Goretzka	(Germany)	MF	327	54	2013	2026	13	Bayern 211, Schalke 116
178	**Maximilian Eggestein**	(Germany)	MF	327	22	2014	2026	13	**Freiburg** 171, Bremen 156
181	Bodo Illgner	(Germany)	GK	326	0	1986	1996	12	Köln 326
182	Werner Lorant	(Germany)	MF	325	46	1971	1983	11	Frankfurt 134, Essen 116, Saarbrücken 34, Dortmund 23, Schalke 18
182	Norbert Nachtweih	(Germany)	MF	325	46	1978	1991	13	Bayern 202, Frankfurt 123
182	Kevin Trapp	(Germany)	GK	325	0	2011	2025	12	Frankfurt 293, Kaiserslautern 32
185	Dariusz Wosz	(Germany)	MF	324	39	1992	2007	12	Bochum 239, Hertha 85
186	Ole Bjørnmose	(Denmark)	MF	323	52	1966	1977	11	Hamburg 186, Bremen 137
186	Gerald Asamoah	(Germany)	FW	323	50	1999	2013	13	Schalke 279, St. Pauli 27, Fürth 17
186	Lukas Hradecky	(Finland)	GK	323	0	2015	2025	10	Leverkusen 222, Frankfurt 101
189	Franz Roth	(Germany)	MF	322	72	1966	1978	12	Bayern 322
189	Dedé	(Brazil)	DF	322	12	1998	2011	13	Dortmund 322
191	Franco Foda	(Germany)	DF	321	20	1983	1996	13	Leverkusen 113, Kaiserslautern 90, Stuttgart 69, Bielefeld 34, Saarbrücken 15
191	Harald Spörl	(Germany)	MF	321	60	1987	2000	14	Hamburg 321
191	Hasan Salihamidžić	(Bosnia and Herzegovina)	MF	321	52	1996	2012	13	Bayern 234, Hamburg 72, Wolfsburg 15
194	Dietmar Schwager	(Germany)	DF	320	2	1964	1975	11	Kaiserslautern 320
194	Peter Nogly	(Germany)	DF	320	38	1969	1980	11	Hamburg 320
194	Caspar Memering	(Germany)	MF	320	38	1971	1985	12	Hamburg 303, Schalke 17
194	Friedhelm Funkel	(Germany)	MF	320	83	1975	1989	12	Uerdingen 254, Kaiserslautern 66
198	Hermann Ohlicher	(Germany)	MF	318	96	1973	1985	10	Stuttgart 318
198	Uwe Rahn	(Germany)	FW	318	107	1980	1993	13	M’gladbach 227, Köln 43, Hertha 21, Düsseldorf 15, Frankfurt 12
198	Dietmar Roth	(Germany)	DF	318	5	1984	1996	12	Frankfurt 237, Schalke 50, Karlsruhe 31
198	David Jarolím	(Czech Republic)	MF	318	17	1999	2012	12	Hamburg 257, Nürnberg 60, Bayern 1
198	Heiko Westermann	(Germany)	DF	318	26	2005	2015	10	Hamburg 159, Schalke 92, Bielefeld 67
198	Nico Elvedi	(Switzerland)	DF	318	15	2015	2026	11	M’gladbach 318
204	Lothar Huber	(Germany)	DF	317	30	1971	1986	14	Dortmund 254, Kaiserslautern 63
204	Frank Neubarth	(Germany)	FW	317	97	1982	1996	14	Bremen 317
206	Rüdiger Abramczik	(Germany)	FW	316	77	1973	1987	12	Schalke 202, Dortmund 90, Nürnberg 24
207	Ludwig Müller	(Germany)	DF	314	26	1964	1975	11	Nürnberg 136, Hertha 97, M’gladbach 81
207	Ernst Diehl	(Germany)	DF	314	18	1967	1978	11	Kaiserslautern 314
207	Sebastian Kehl	(Germany)	MF	314	24	2000	2015	15	Dortmund 274, Freiburg 40
207	Jérôme Boateng	(Germany)	DF	314	5	2007	2021	14	Bayern 229, Hamburg 75, Hertha 10
207	**Vincenzo Grifo**	(Italy)	MF	314	73	2012	2026	12	**Freiburg** 277, Hoffenheim 20, M’gladbach 17
212	Werner Schneider	(Germany)	DF	313	18	1972	1983	12	Duisburg 157, Dortmund 122, Hertha 34
213	Thomas Wolter	(Germany)	MF	312	12	1984	1998	14	Bremen 312
214	Rainer Bonhof	(Germany)	MF	311	57	1970	1983	11	M’gladbach 231, Köln 74, Hertha 6
214	Pablo Thiam	(Guinea)	MF	311	23	1994	2007	14	Wolfsburg 117, Köln 89, Stuttgart 89, Bayern 16
216	Wolfgang Dremmler	(Germany)	MF	310	15	1974	1985	12	Bayern 172, Braunschweig 138
216	Karl-Heinz Rummenigge	(Germany)	FW	310	162	1974	1984	10	Bayern 310
218	Hans Weiner	(Germany)	DF	309	14	1972	1982	10	Hertha 218, Bayern 91
218	Wilfried Hannes	(Germany)	DF	309	62	1975	1988	13	M’gladbach 261, Schalke 48
218	Ralf Dusend	(Germany)	MF	309	42	1978	1990	13	Düsseldorf 239, Nürnberg 70
218	Michael Rummenigge	(Germany)	MF	309	80	1983	1993	12	Dortmund 157, Bayern 152
218	Ludwig Kögl	(Germany)	MF	309	23	1984	2000	14	Bayern 149, Stuttgart 139, Unterhaching 21
223	Horst Köppel	(Germany)	MF	308	83	1966	1979	12	M’gladbach 184, Stuttgart 124
223	Wolfgang Wolf	(Germany)	DF	308	16	1978	1992	12	Kaiserslautern 248, Stuttg. Kickers 60
223	Bum-kun Cha	(South Korea)	FW	308	98	1978	1989	11	Leverkusen 185, Frankfurt 122, Darmstadt 1
223	Jonny Otten	(Germany)	DF	308	1	1979	1992	12	Bremen 308
227	Rudi Assauer	(Germany)	DF	307	12	1964	1976	12	Bremen 188, Dortmund 119
227	Miroslav Klose	(Germany)	FW	307	121	2000	2011	12	Kaiserslautern 120, Bayern 98, Bremen 89
227	Cacau	(Germany)	FW	307	88	2001	2014	13	Stuttgart 263, Nürnberg 44
227	Max Kruse	(Germany)	FW	307	97	2007	2022	12	Bremen 85, M’gladbach 66, Wolfsburg 51, Union 38, Freiburg 34, St. Pauli 33
231	Felix Magath	(Germany)	MF	306	46	1976	1986	10	Hamburg 306
231	Fabian Ernst	(Germany)	MF	306	12	1998	2009	11	Bremen 152, Schalke 106, Hamburg 48
231	Robin Knoche	(Germany)	DF	306	16	2011	2024	13	Wolfsburg 183, Union 123
234	Wolfgang Grzyb	(Germany)	DF	305	19	1966	1977	11	Braunschweig 305
234	Josef Pirrung	(Germany)	MF	305	61	1969	1981	12	Kaiserslautern 305
234	Wolfgang Funkel	(Germany)	DF	305	41	1984	1995	11	Uerdingen 210, Kaiserslautern 95
237	Aaron Hunt	(Germany)	MF	304	57	2004	2018	14	Bremen 215, Hamburg 72, Wolfsburg 17
237	Marco Russ	(Germany)	DF	304	24	2006	2019	14	Frankfurt 280, Wolfsburg 24
237	Bastian Oczipka	(Germany)	DF	304	3	2010	2022	12	Frankfurt 146, Schalke 111, St. Pauli 20, Union 18, Leverkusen 9
237	Leonardo Bittencourt	(Germany)	MF	304	32	2012	2026	13	Bremen 153, Köln 67, Hannover 57, Hoffenheim 22, Dortmund 5
237	**Jonas Hofmann**	(Germany)	MF	304	55	2012	2026	15	M’gladbach 184, **Leverkusen** 72, Dortmund 38, Mainz 10
242	Dieter Müller	(Germany)	FW	303	177	1973	1986	11	Köln 248, Stuttgart 30, Saarbrücken 23, Offenbach 2
242	Jürgen Röber	(Germany)	MF	303	75	1974	1986	11	Bremen 184, Leverkusen 105, Bayern 14
242	Josef Weikl	(Germany)	MF	303	25	1977	1987	10	Düsseldorf 303
242	Hans-Jörg Criens	(Germany)	FW	303	94	1982	1994	12	M’gladbach 290, Nürnberg 13
242	Axel Roos	(Germany)	DF	303	17	1984	2000	16	Kaiserslautern 303
242	Manfred Schwabl	(Germany)	MF	303	14	1985	1997	12	Nürnberg 133, Bayern 87, 1860 Munich 83
242	Andreas Fischer	(Germany)	MF	303	20	1989	2001	12	Hamburg 152, Leverkusen 151
249	Steve Cherundolo	(United States)	DF	302	6	2002	2013	12	Hannover 302
249	Daniel Baier	(Germany)	MF	302	6	2003	2020	12	Augsburg 274, Wolfsburg 16, 1860 Munich 12
249	**Stefan Bell**	(Germany)	DF	302	15	2012	2026	13	**Mainz** 302
252	Dieter Zembski	(Germany)	DF	301	4	1969	1979	12	Bremen 179, Braunschweig 122
252	Andreas Brehme	(Germany)	DF	301	50	1981	1998	11	Kaiserslautern 242, Bayern 59
252	Michael Klinkert	(Germany)	DF	301	18	1987	1999	11	M’gladbach 274, Schalke 27
252	Lars Ricken	(Germany)	MF	301	49	1994	2007	14	Dortmund 301
252	Zvonimir Soldo	(Croatia)	MF	301	15	1996	2006	10	Stuttgart 301
252	Timo Hildebrand	(Germany)	GK	301	0	1999	2014	14	Stuttgart 221, Schalke 39, Hoffenheim 38, Frankfurt 3
258	Bernd Gersdorff	(Germany)	MF	300	68	1969	1980	11	Braunschweig 203, Hertha 85, Bayern 12
258	Rüdiger Wenzel	(Germany)	FW	300	91	1975	1990	11	Düsseldorf 143, Frankfurt 130, St. Pauli 27
258	Frank Hartmann	(Germany)	MF	300	64	1980	1992	13	Kaiserslautern 99, Köln 84, Wattenscheid 65, Schalke 52
258	Uwe Bein	(Germany)	MF	300	91	1983	1994	11	Frankfurt 150, Köln 64, Hamburg 52, Offenbach 34
258	Marco Kurz	(Germany)	DF	300	5	1990	2004	15	1860 Munich 129, Nürnberg 108, Schalke 58, Dortmund 4, Stuttgart 1
258	Markus Schroth	(Germany)	FW	300	62	1994	2007	13	1860 Munich 150, Nürnberg 83, Karlsruhe 67
258	Niklas Süle	(Germany)	DF	300	16	2013	2026	13	Bayern 114, Hoffenheim 108, Dortmund 78
Minimum 300 appearances

== Most Bundesliga appearances by club ==
- First / Last: year of the first / last Bundesliga appearance for the club
- Seasons (S): number of Bundesliga seasons in which the player made at least one appearance for the club

Current Bundesliga clubs and players are shown in bold.

As of matches played 8 November 2026

Rank	Club	Player	Nat	Apps	First	Last	S
1	**Eintracht Frankfurt**	Charly Körbel	(Germany)	602	1972	1991	19
2	**Hamburger SV**	Manfred Kaltz	(Germany)	581	1971	1991	19
3	VfL Bochum	Michael Lameck	(Germany)	518	1972	1988	16
4	**Bayern Munich**	Thomas Müller	(Germany)	503	2008	2025	17
5	**Schalke 04**	Klaus Fichtel	(Germany)	477	1965	1988	19
6	**Borussia Dortmund**	Michael Zorc	(Germany)	463	1981	1998	17
7	**Werder Bremen**	Dieter Burdenski	(Germany)	444	1973	1988	15
8	Fortuna Düsseldorf	Gerd Zewe	(Germany)	440	1972	1987	15
9	**1. FC Köln**	Toni Schumacher	(Germany)	422	1973	1987	14
10	**Borussia Mönchengladbach**	Berti Vogts	(Germany)	419	1965	1979	14
10	Eintracht Braunschweig	Franz Merkhoffer	(Germany)	419	1968	1983	14
12	MSV Duisburg	Michael Bella	(Germany)	405	1964	1978	14
13	**Bayer Leverkusen**	Rüdiger Vollborn	(Germany)	401	1983	1999	15
13	**TSG Hoffenheim**	**Oliver Baumann**	(Germany)	401	2014	2026	13
15	VfL Wolfsburg	Maximilian Arnold	(Germany)	400	2011	2026	15
16	1. FC Kaiserslautern	Werner Melzer	(Germany)	374	1974	1986	12
17	**SC Freiburg**	**Christian Günter**	(Germany)	370	2012	2026	13
18	**VfB Stuttgart**	Karl Allgöwer	(Germany)	338	1980	1991	11
19	1. FC Nürnberg	Thomas Brunner	(Germany)	328	1980	1994	13
20	Hannover 96	Steve Cherundolo	(United States)	302	2002	2013	12
20	**Mainz 05**	**Stefan Bell**	(Germany)	302	2012	2026	13
22	Hertha BSC	Pál Dárdai	(Hungary)	286	1997	2010	13
23	Karlsruher SC	Gunther Metz	(Germany)	278	1987	1998	12
24	**FC Augsburg**	**Jeffrey Gouweleeuw**	(Netherlands)	277	2016	2026	12
25	**RB Leipzig**	Péter Gulácsi	(Hungary)	269	2016	2026	10
26	Bayer Uerdingen	Friedhelm Funkel	(Germany)	254	1975	1989	9
27	1860 Munich	Harald Cerny	(Austria)	238	1996	2004	9
28	Waldhof Mannheim	Uwe Zimmermann	(Germany)	215	1983	1990	7
29	**Union Berlin**	**Christopher Trimmel**	(Austria)	199	2019	2026	8
30	FC St. Pauli	André Trulsen	(Germany)	177	1988	2002	6
31	Rot-Weiss Essen	Willi Lippens	(Netherlands)	172	1966	1976	6
32	Arminia Bielefeld	Rüdiger Kauf	(Germany)	170	2002	2009	6
33	Hansa Rostock	Timo Lange	(Germany)	165	1995	2003	8
34	Kickers Offenbach	Sigfried Held	(Germany)	133	1972	1976	4
35	Energie Cottbus	Timo Rost	(Germany)	129	2002	2009	5
36	Rot-Weiß Oberhausen	Friedhelm Dick	(Germany)	126	1969	1973	4
37	Wattenscheid 09	Thorsten Fink	(Germany)	125	1990	1994	4
38	Dynamo Dresden	Matthias Maucksch	(Germany)	118	1991	1995	4
39	1. FC Heidenheim	Patrick Mainka	(Germany)	102	2023	2026	3
Minimum 100 appearances

== See also ==
- List of Bundesliga top scorers
- Bundesliga records and statistics
