= 1986 DFB-Pokal final =

- Match programme cover
- Event: 1985–86 DFB-Pokal
| Bayern Munich | VfB Stuttgart |
| 5 | 2 |
- Date: 3 May 1986
- Venue: Olympiastadion, West Berlin
- Referee: Dieter Pauly (Rheydt)
- Attendance: 76,000

The 1986 DFB-Pokal final decided the winner of the 1985–86 DFB-Pokal, the 43rd season of Germany's premier knockout football cup competition. It was played on 3 May 1986 at the Olympiastadion in West Berlin. Bayern Munich won the match 5–2 against VfB Stuttgart to claim their eighth cup title.

== Route to the final ==
The DFB-Pokal began with 64 teams in a single-elimination knockout cup competition. There were a total of five rounds leading up to the final. Teams were drawn against each other, and the winner after 90 minutes would advance. If still tied, 30 minutes of extra time was played. If the score was still level, a replay would take place at the original away team's stadium. If still level after 90 minutes, 30 minutes of extra time was played. If the score was still level, a drawing of lots would decide who would advance to the next round.

Note: In all results below, the score of the finalist is given first (H: home; A: away).

| Bayern Munich | | Round | VfB Stuttgart |
|---|---|---|---|---|
| Opponent | Result | 1985–86 DFB-Pokal | Opponent | Result |
| Kickers Offenbach (A) | 3–1 | Round 1 | Eintracht Braunschweig (H) | 6–3 |
| 1. FC Saarbrücken (A) | 3–1 | Round 2 | 1. FC Nürnberg (A) | 1–0 |
| VfL Bochum (A) (H) | 1–1 (a.e.t.); 2–0 (replay) | Round of 16 | Werder Bremen (H) | 2–0 |
| 1. FC Kaiserslautern (A) | 3–0 | Quarter-finals | Schalke 04 (H) | 6–2 |
| Waldhof Mannheim (A) | 2–0 | Semi-finals | Borussia Dortmund (H) | 4–1 |

== Match ==
=== Details ===
3 May 1986
18:00 CEST

| Bayern Munich | 5–2 | VfB Stuttgart |
|---|---|---|
| Wohlfarth 33', 42', 76'; Rummenigge 64', 72' | Report | Buchwald 76'; Klinsmann 85' |

Olympiastadion, West Berlin
Attendance: 76,000
Referee: Dieter Pauly (Rheydt)

| Bayern Munich | VfB Stuttgart |

| GK | 1 | (Belgium) Jean-Marie Pfaff |
| RB | 2 | (East Germany) Norbert Nachtweih |
| CB | 5 | (West Germany) Klaus Augenthaler (c) | Booked |
| CB | 4 | (West Germany) Norbert Eder |
| LB | 3 | (West Germany) Hans Pflügler |
| CM | 8 | (West Germany) Lothar Matthäus |
| CM | 6 | (Denmark) Søren Lerby | Booked |
| AM | 10 | (West Germany) Michael Rummenigge | | (substituted off) 84' |
| RF | 7 | (West Germany) Roland Wohlfarth | Booked | (substituted off) 84' |
| CF | 9 | (West Germany) Dieter Hoeneß |
| LF | 11 | (West Germany) Reinhold Mathy |
Substitutes:
| DF | 14 | (West Germany) Holger Willmer | | (substituted on) 84' |
| FW | 13 | (West Germany) Frank Hartmann | | (substituted on) 84' |
Manager:
(West Germany) Udo Lattek

| GK | 1 | (West Germany) Armin Jäger |
| SW | 5 | (West Germany) Rainer Zietsch |
| CB | 4 | (West Germany) Karlheinz Förster (c) |
| CB | 6 | (West Germany) Guido Buchwald |
| RWB | 2 | (West Germany) Günther Schäfer | Booked |
| LWB | 3 | (West Germany) Michael Nushöhr | | (substituted off) 46' |
| CM | 7 | (West Germany) Karl Allgöwer | | (substituted off) 46' |
| CM | 10 | (West Germany) Andreas Müller |
| CM | 8 | (Iceland) Ásgeir Sigurvinsson |
| CF | 9 | (West Germany) Jürgen Klinsmann | Booked |
| CF | 11 | (Socialist Federal Republic of Yugoslavia) Predrag Pašić |
Substitutes:
| MF | 13 | (West Germany) Michael Spies | | (substituted on) 46' |
| MF | 14 | (West Germany) Jürgen Hartmann | | (substituted on) 46' |
Manager:
(West Germany) Willi Entenmann

Match rules

- 90 minutes.
- 30 minutes of extra time if necessary.
- Penalty shoot-out if scores still level.
- Maximum of two substitutions.
