= 1983–84 Bundesliga =

21st season of the Bundesliga

Bundesliga
- Season: 1983–84
- Dates: 12 August 1983 – 26 May 1984
- Champions: VfB Stuttgart; 1st Bundesliga title 3rd German title
- Relegated: Kickers Offenbach; 1. FC Nürnberg
- European Cup: VfB Stuttgart
- Cup Winners' Cup: FC Bayern Munich
- UEFA Cup: Hamburger SV; Borussia Mönchengladbach; SV Werder Bremen; 1. FC Köln
- Goals: 1,097
- Average goals/game: 3.58
- Top goalscorer: Karl-Heinz Rummenigge (26)
- Biggest home win: Bayern Munich 9–0 Offenbach (13 March 1984)
- Biggest away win: Nürnberg 0–6 Stuttgart (27 April 1984)
- Highest scoring: Uerdingen 4–6 Köln (10 goals) (19 May 1984); Offenbach 3–7 Bremen (10 goals) (11 May 1984)

The 1983–84 Bundesliga was the 21st season of the Bundesliga, the premier football league in West Germany. It began on 12 August 1983 and ended on 26 May 1984. Stuttgart won the championship. Defending champions, Hamburg finished second. The 1983–84 Bundesliga season holds the record for most goals scored in a Bundesliga season.

== Competition modus ==
Every team played two games against each other team, one at home and one away. Teams received two points for a win and one point for a draw. If two or more teams were tied on points, places were determined by goal difference and, if still tied, by goals scored. The team with the most points were crowned champions while the two teams with the fewest points were relegated to 2. Bundesliga. The third-to-last team had to compete in a two-legged relegation/promotion play-off against the third-placed team from 2. Bundesliga.

== Team changes to 1982–83 ==
Karlsruher SC and Hertha BSC were directly relegated to the 2. Bundesliga after finishing in the last two places. They were replaced by SV Waldhof Mannheim and Kickers Offenbach. Karlsruhe and Hertha BSC were eventually joined in demotion by relegation/promotion play-off participant FC Schalke 04, who lost on aggregate against Bayer 05 Uerdingen.

== Season overview ==
On the 32nd game day of the season 53 goals were scored in 9 games, marking the highest number of goals ever scored in a single game day of the Bundesliga. The 1983–84 season is also the season in which the most goals of the course of the whole season were scored, 1097 in total.

== Team overview ==
Location of teams in Bundesliga 1983–84

Club	Location	Ground	Capacity
Arminia Bielefeld	Bielefeld	Stadion Alm	35,000
VfL Bochum	Bochum	Ruhrstadion	40,000
Eintracht Braunschweig	Braunschweig	Stadion an der Hamburger Straße	38,000
SV Werder Bremen	Bremen	Weserstadion	32,000
Borussia Dortmund	Dortmund	Westfalenstadion	54,000
Fortuna Düsseldorf	Düsseldorf	Rheinstadion	59,600
Eintracht Frankfurt	Frankfurt am Main	Waldstadion	62,000
Hamburger SV	Hamburg	Volksparkstadion	80,000
1. FC Kaiserslautern	Kaiserslautern	Stadion Betzenberg	42,000
1. FC Köln	Cologne	Müngersdorfer Stadion	61,000
Bayer 04 Leverkusen	Leverkusen	Ulrich-Haberland-Stadion	20,000
SV Waldhof Mannheim	Ludwigshafen am Rhein	Südweststadion	75,000
Borussia Mönchengladbach	Mönchengladbach	Bökelbergstadion	34,500
FC Bayern Munich	Munich	Olympiastadion	80,000
1. FC Nürnberg	Nuremberg	Städtisches Stadion	64,238
Kickers Offenbach	Offenbach am Main	Bieberer Berg	30,000
VfB Stuttgart	Stuttgart	Neckarstadion	72,000
Bayer 05 Uerdingen	Krefeld	Grotenburg-Kampfbahn	28,000

- ^1 Waldhof Mannheim played their matches in nearby Ludwigshafen because their own ground did not fulfil Bundesliga requirements.

== League table ==
Pos	Team	Pld	W	D	L	GF	GA	GD	Pts	Qualification or relegation
1	VfB Stuttgart (C)	34	19	10	5	79	33	+46	48	Qualification to European Cup first round
2	Hamburger SV	34	21	6	7	75	36	+39	48	Qualification to UEFA Cup first round (Note: As Bayern Munich qualified for the Cup Winners' Cup, their UEFA Cup spot was transferred to Köln.)
3	Borussia Mönchengladbach	34	21	6	7	81	48	+33	48	Qualification to UEFA Cup first round
4	Bayern Munich	34	20	7	7	84	41	+43	47	Qualification to Cup Winners' Cup first round
5	Werder Bremen	34	19	7	8	79	46	+33	45	Qualification to UEFA Cup first round
6	1. FC Köln	34	16	6	12	70	57	+13	38	Qualification to UEFA Cup first round
7	Bayer Leverkusen	34	13	8	13	50	50	0	34	
8	Arminia Bielefeld	34	12	9	13	40	49	−9	33	
9	Eintracht Braunschweig	34	13	6	15	54	69	−15	32	
10	Bayer 05 Uerdingen	34	12	7	15	66	79	−13	31	
11	Waldhof Mannheim	34	10	11	13	45	58	−13	31	
12	1. FC Kaiserslautern	34	12	6	16	68	69	−1	30	
13	Borussia Dortmund	34	11	8	15	54	65	−11	30	
14	Fortuna Düsseldorf	34	11	7	16	63	75	−12	29	
15	VfL Bochum	34	10	8	16	58	70	−12	28	
16	Eintracht Frankfurt (O)	34	7	13	14	45	61	−16	27	Qualification to relegation play-offs
17	Kickers Offenbach (R)	34	7	5	22	48	106	−58	19	Relegation to 2. Bundesliga
18	1. FC Nürnberg (R)	34	6	2	26	38	85	−47	14	Relegation to 2. Bundesliga

Source: www.dfb.de
Rules for classification: 1) points; 2) goal difference; 3) number of goals scored.
(C) Champions; (O) Play-off winners; (R) Relegated

== Results ==
Home \ Away	DSC	BOC	EBS	SVW	BVB	F95	SGE	HSV	FCK	KOE	B04	WMA	BMG	FCB	FCN	KOF	VFB	B05
Arminia Bielefeld	—	2–1	0–0	2–0	0–0	1–3	2–1	0–1	3–2	1–2	3–0	1–1	2–2	1–3	1–0	3–1	0–0	3–1
VfL Bochum	2–3	—	3–1	3–3	2–2	6–1	4–1	1–1	4–1	2–3	2–1	1–0	0–4	3–1	2–0	1–0	0–1	2–2
Eintracht Braunschweig	2–0	3–1	—	1–2	5–0	4–1	4–3	0–0	4–0	2–2	0–0	3–2	3–1	1–2	1–0	4–4	1–0	1–2
Werder Bremen	3–0	5–2	4–0	—	2–1	2–0	2–3	0–0	1–1	1–0	3–0	5–0	2–0	3–2	2–0	8–1	1–2	5–2
Borussia Dortmund	1–0	1–1	0–2	2–3	—	6–0	2–0	1–2	1–0	0–0	3–0	4–1	4–1	1–1	3–1	4–1	0–3	2–1
Fortuna Düsseldorf	0–0	1–1	4–0	3–4	7–0	—	4–2	2–3	1–5	2–0	2–2	1–2	4–1	4–1	2–1	5–0	3–0	1–1
Eintracht Frankfurt	1–1	1–0	1–2	0–0	2–2	3–0	—	0–0	3–0	0–2	2–2	1–3	1–1	0–0	3–1	3–0	1–3	2–2
Hamburger SV	2–0	2–1	3–0	4–0	7–2	5–2	0–2	—	3–2	2–2	3–0	2–3	2–1	2–1	4–0	6–0	0–2	2–2
1. FC Kaiserslautern	6–0	2–0	3–1	3–3	2–2	5–2	1–0	0–2	—	2–2	3–0	2–0	0–2	0–1	4–2	1–1	2–2	5–2
1. FC Köln	2–3	3–0	2–1	1–4	5–2	1–0	7–0	1–4	1–4	—	2–0	2–0	1–2	2–0	3–1	1–0	2–2	3–0
Bayer Leverkusen	0–0	3–0	3–0	0–0	4–2	2–0	2–2	2–0	2–0	2–1	—	0–1	1–2	1–5	3–0	3–1	1–1	3–1
Waldhof Mannheim	0–2	3–3	2–2	2–0	4–1	1–1	1–1	0–1	2–0	2–2	0–3	—	2–3	0–0	1–0	6–1	2–2	1–4
Borussia Mönchengladbach	3–0	4–2	6–2	3–1	2–1	1–1	1–1	4–0	3–2	4–2	3–1	3–0	—	3–0	2–0	3–2	2–0	7–1
Bayern Munich	3–1	5–1	6–0	0–0	1–0	1–1	3–0	1–0	5–2	4–2	2–1	6–0	4–0	—	4–2	9–0	2–2	3–2
1. FC Nürnberg	2–0	3–1	4–2	2–0	0–2	2–1	0–0	1–6	3–4	1–3	2–3	0–0	1–3	2–4	—	4–0	0–6	2–4
Kickers Offenbach	2–2	2–2	1–2	3–7	0–0	5–1	2–1	0–4	3–2	2–0	0–2	0–2	4–3	2–3	3–1	—	1–2	3–2
VfB Stuttgart	1–0	4–2	3–0	3–0	3–1	6–0	2–2	0–1	5–1	3–2	2–2	0–0	0–0	1–0	7–0	5–1	—	4–0
Bayer Uerdingen	1–3	1–2	4–0	0–3	2–1	1–3	5–2	3–1	3–1	4–6	2–1	1–1	1–1	1–1	1–0	4–2	3–2	—

Source: DFB
Legend: Blue = home team win; Yellow = draw; Red = away team win.

== Relegation play-offs ==
Eintracht Frankfurt and third-placed 2. Bundesliga team MSV Duisburg had to compete in a two-legged relegation/promotion play-off. Frankfurt won 6–1 on aggregate and remained in the Bundesliga.

1 June 1984

MSV Duisburg	0–5	Eintracht Frankfurt
	Report link (in German)	Svensson 23'; Müller 53'; Falkenmayer 68'; Tobollik 78'; Krämer 80'

Wedaustadion, Duisburg
Attendance: 29,000
Referee: Wilfried Heitmann (Drentwede)

5 June 1984

Eintracht Frankfurt	1–1	MSV Duisburg
Müller 83'	Report link (in German)	Schlipper 80'

Waldstadion, Frankfurt
Attendance: 42,000
Referee: Hans-Peter Dellwing (Trier)

== Top goalscorers ==
26 goals

- (Germany) Karl-Heinz Rummenigge (FC Bayern Munich)

20 goals

- (Germany) Klaus Allofs (1. FC Köln)

19 goals

- (Germany) Frank Mill (Borussia Mönchengladbach)

18 goals

- (Germany) Christian Schreier (VfL Bochum)
- (Germany) Rudi Völler (SV Werder Bremen)

17 goals

- (Germany) Pierre Littbarski (1. FC Köln)

16 goals

- (Germany) Fritz Walter (SV Waldhof Mannheim)

15 goals

- (Germany) Thomas Allofs (1. FC Kaiserslautern)
- (Germany) Friedhelm Funkel (Bayer 05 Uerdingen)
- (Germany) Dieter Schatzschneider (Hamburger SV)
- (Germany) Herbert Waas (Bayer 04 Leverkusen)

== Champion squad ==
VfB Stuttgart
Goalkeepers: Helmut Roleder (29); Armin Jäger (6).

Defenders: Guido Buchwald (34 / 3); Bernd Förster (31 / 2); Karlheinz Förster (captain; 29 / 2); Günther Schäfer (26 / 2); Hans-Peter Makan (24 / 1); Rainer Zietsch (10).
Midfielders: Hermann Ohlicher (32 / 8); Ásgeir Sigurvinsson (Iceland) (31 / 12); Karl Allgöwer (29 / 12); Kurt Niedermayer (27 / 3); Andreas Müller (20 / 5); Thomas Kempe (13 / 1).
Forwards: Peter Reichert (31 / 13); Walter Kelsch (29 / 3); Dan Corneliusson (Sweden) (28 / 12); Achim Glückler (1); Rudi Lorch (1).
(league appearances and goals listed in brackets)

Manager: Helmut Benthaus.

On the roster but have not played in a league game: none.

== See also ==
- 1983–84 2. Bundesliga
- 1983–84 DFB-Pokal
