= Hans-Peter Makan =

German footballer

Personal information
- Date of birth: 1 January 1960 (age 66)
- Place of birth: Weinheim, West Germany
- Position: Defender

Youth career
- –1982: SV Sandhausen

Senior career*
Years	Team	Apps	(Gls)
1982–1986	VfB Stuttgart	52	(1)
- * Club domestic league appearances and goals

Hans-Peter Makan (born 1 January 1960) is a retired German football player. He spent four seasons in the Bundesliga with VfB Stuttgart.

== Honours ==
- Bundesliga champion: 1983–84
- DFB-Pokal finalist: 1985–86
