= Achim Glückler =

German footballer

Personal information
- Date of birth: 10 August 1964 (age 62)
- Place of birth: Maulbronn, West Germany
- Height: 1.70 m (5 ft 7 in)
- Positions: Midfielder; striker

Youth career
- VfB Stuttgart

Senior career*
Years	Team	Apps	(Gls)
1983–1984	VfB Stuttgart	1	(0)
1984–1986	Karlsruher SC	11	(1)
1986–1988	SSV Ulm 1846	30	(5)
- * Club domestic league appearances and goals

Achim Glückler (born 10 August 1964, in Maulbronn) is a retired German football player. He spent two seasons in the Bundesliga with VfB Stuttgart and Karlsruher SC.

== Honours ==
- Bundesliga champion: 1983–84
