= Rudi Lorch =

German football player

Personal information
- Date of birth: 20 January 1966 (age 60)
- Positions: Midfielder; striker

Senior career*
Years	Team	Apps	(Gls)
1983–1986	VfB Stuttgart	24	(0)
- * Club domestic league appearances and goals

Rudi Lorch (born 20 January 1966) is a retired German football player. He spent three seasons in the Bundesliga with VfB Stuttgart.

== Honours ==
- Bundesliga champion: 1983–84
- DFB-Pokal finalist: 1985–86
