= Michael Kutzop =

German footballer

Personal information
- Date of birth: 24 March 1955 (age 71)
- Place of birth: Lubliniec, Poland
- Height: 1.89 m (6 ft 2 in)
- Position: Defender

Youth career
- FC Bürgel

Senior career*
Years	Team	Apps	(Gls)
1979–1984	Kickers Offenbach	151	(35)
1984–1990	Werder Bremen	121	(23)
Total		272	(58)
- * Club domestic league appearances and goals

Michael Kutzop (born 24 March 1955) is a German former professional footballer who played as a defender. He spent seven seasons in the Bundesliga with Kickers Offenbach and SV Werder Bremen.

Kutzop took arguably the most famous penalty kick in the history of Bundesliga. On the penultimate game day of the 1985–86 season Kutzop's league-leading SV Werder Bremen were playing second-placed Bayern Munich. Werder's victory in that game would guarantee them the title. With the score of 0–0 Kutzop took the penalty kick in the 88th minute and hit the right goalpost. The game ended 0–0. On the last game day Bayern Munich beat Borussia Mönchengladbach 6–0, Werder lost 2–1 to VfB Stuttgart (the team they beat 6–0 earlier in the season) and Bayern took the title on goal difference. That was the only penalty kick he missed in 15 attempts during his Bundesliga years.

Today he works at Rudi Völler's football school in Cala Millor, Mallorca, Spain.

== Honours ==
Werder Bremen

- Bundesliga: 1987–88; runner-up: 1984–85, 1985–86
- DFB-Pokal finalist: 1988–89, 1989–90
- DFL-Supercup: 1988
