= Walter Eschweiler =

German football referee

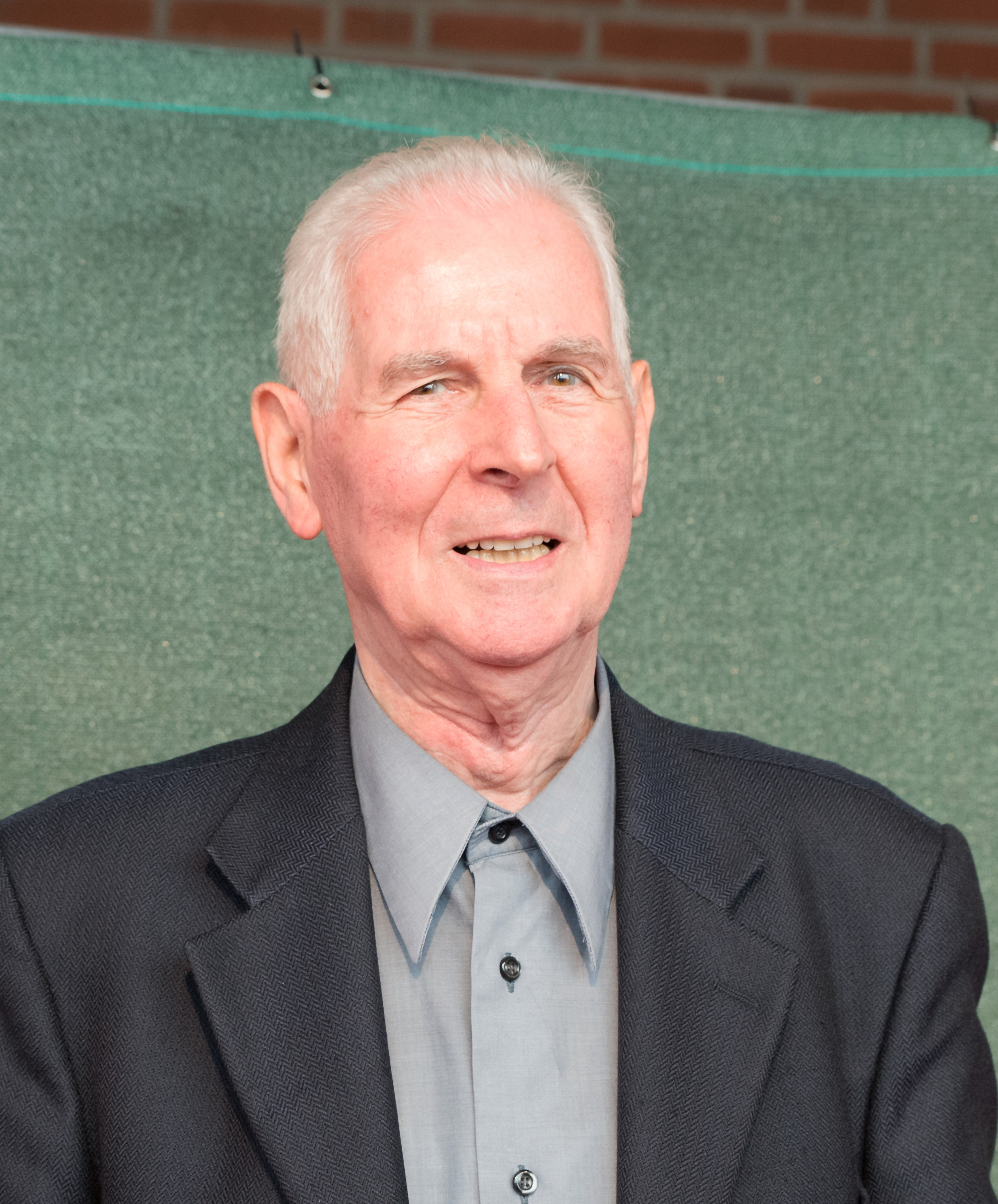
- Eschweiler in 2016
- Born: 20 September 1935 (age 91); Bonn, Germany

Domestic
Years	League	Role

International
Years	League	Role
??	FIFA-listed	Referee

Walter Eschweiler (born September 20, 1935) is a retired German football referee. He is known for having refereed one match in the 1982 FIFA World Cup in Spain where he was accidentally knocked to the floor by a Peruvian and his cards and notebook fell out of his pocket onto the ground.
