= Bieberer Berg =

Hill in Hesse, Germany

Coordinates: 50°05′40″N 8°47′55″E

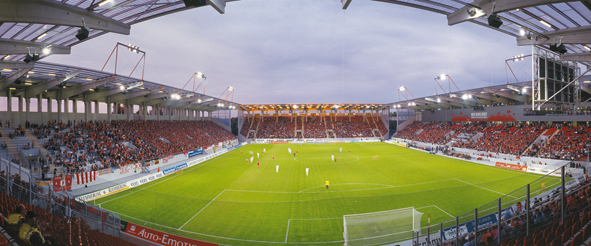
- Stadion am Bieberer Berg

Geography
- Location: Hesse, Germany

The Bieberer Berg is a hill in Offenbach in the German state of Hesse. The hill is well known in Germany because the local stadium that is the home ground of Kickers Offenbach. The hill area also contains a water tower and 22 hectares (54 acres) park with a ropes course.
