= Gerhard Heinze =

German footballer (born 1948)

Personal information
- Date of birth: 30 November 1948 (age 77)
- Place of birth: Neu-Ulm, Germany
- Height: 1.76 m (5 ft 9 in)
- Position: Goalkeeper

Youth career
- 1965-1967: VfB Stuttgart

Senior career*
Years	Team	Apps	(Gls)
1967–1975	VfB Stuttgart	193	(0)
1975–1983	MSV Duisburg	235	(0)

International career
1971	Germany U21	2	(0)
- * Club domestic league appearances and goals

Gerhard Heinze (born 30 November 1948) is a retired German football player. He spent 15 seasons in the Bundesliga with VfB Stuttgart and MSV Duisburg. The best result he achieved in the league was fifth place.
