= Thomas Kempe (footballer) =

German footballer

Personal information
- Date of birth: 17 March 1960 (age 66)
- Place of birth: Voerde, West Germany
- Position: Defensive midfielder

Youth career
- –1979: TV Voerde

Senior career*
Years	Team	Apps	(Gls)
1979–1982	MSV Duisburg	88	(13)
1982–1985	VfB Stuttgart	69	(13)
1985–1994	VfL Bochum	234	(16)
Total		391	(42)

International career
1979–1982	West Germany U-21	11	(1)
1979–1986	West Germany B	2	(0)
Medal record
VfB Stuttgart
Winner	Bundesliga	1983–84
VfL Bochum
Runner-up	DFB-Pokal	1987–88
Winner	2. Bundesliga	1993–94
- * Club domestic league appearances and goals

Thomas Kempe (born 17 March 1960) is a German retired professional footballer who played as a defensive midfielder. His sons Dennis and Tobias were also professional footballers.

== Career statistics ==
Appearances and goals by club, season and competition
Club	Season	League			DFB-Pokal		Europe		Total	
Club	Season	Division	Apps	Goals	Apps	Goals	Apps	Goals	Apps	Goals
MSV Duisburg	1979–80	Bundesliga	31	6	1	0	—		32	6
MSV Duisburg	1980–81	Bundesliga	26	3	1	0	—		27	3
MSV Duisburg	1981–82	Bundesliga	31	4	3	0	—		34	4
MSV Duisburg	Total		88	13	5	0	0	0	93	13
VfB Stuttgart	1982–83	Bundesliga	30	7	4	1	—		34	8
VfB Stuttgart	1983–84	Bundesliga	13	1	2	1	2	0	17	2
VfB Stuttgart	1984–85	Bundesliga	26	5	2	1	2	0	30	6
VfB Stuttgart	Total		69	13	8	3	4	0	81	16
VfL Bochum	1985–86	Bundesliga	31	3	4	2	—		35	5
VfL Bochum	1986–87	Bundesliga	32	2	1	0	—		33	2
VfL Bochum	1987–88	Bundesliga	29	2	5	0	—		34	2
VfL Bochum	1988–89	Bundesliga	25	1	3	0	—		28	1
VfL Bochum	1989–90	Bundesliga	30	3	1	0	—		31	3
VfL Bochum	1990–91	Bundesliga	27	3	1	0	—		28	3
VfL Bochum	1991–92	Bundesliga	28	1	1	0	—		29	1
VfL Bochum	1992–93	Bundesliga	32	1	1	0	—		33	1
VfL Bochum	1993–94	2. Bundesliga	0	0	0	0	—		0	0
VfL Bochum	Total		234	16	17	2	0	0	251	18
Career total			391	42	30	5	4	0	425	47
