= Wolf-Dieter Ahlenfelder =

German football referee

- Born: 11 February 1944; Oberhausen, Germany
- Died: 2 August 2014 (aged 70); Oberhausen, Germany
- Other occupation: Merchant

Domestic
Years	League	Role
1975–1988	Bundesliga	Referee
1974–1988	2. Bundesliga	Referee

Wolf-Dieter Ahlenfelder (11 February 1944 – 2 August 2014) was a German association football referee. Between 1974 and 1988 Ahlenfelder refereed 106 games in the Bundesliga as well as 77 2. Bundesliga games.

== Biography ==
Ahlenfelder is best remembered for the game between SV Werder Bremen and Hannover 96 in the 1975–76 Bundesliga season when he called half-time after 32 minutes instead of the regulation 45. After complaints by the players Ahlenfelder questioned his assistant who confirmed that it was indeed too early to call half time. He continued the first half but still stopped it a minute early. Later questioning revealed that Ahlenfelder had been drinking during his lunch before the game and felt a little confused. He received a short ban from officiating Bundesliga games but was soon allowed back as a referee.

Ahlenfelder was popular with Bundesliga players because of his direct nature. When told by former German international Paul Breitner that he is "refereeing like an asshole" Ahlenfelder replied to Breitner "could it be that you are playing like an asshole?". When players took longer than he desired to get up after being fouled Ahlenfelder would tell them "get up, the under-soil heating isn't switched on anyway".

In the 1983–84 Ahlenfelder was voted best German football referee and awarded the Golden Whistle (German: Goldene Pfeife).

In an interview in 2007 Ahlenfelder stated that he missed the attention he received while refereeing. He also stated that modern referees were too colourless and restricted by the rules of the game, exposed to constant surveillance and criticism. Ahlenfelder, who suffered from diabetes in his later life, died on 2 August 2014 in Oberhausen, the city of his birth. By profession he was a merchant, working for a mineral oil company.
