= Armin Jäger =

German footballer

Personal information
- Date of birth: 19 September 1962 (age 64)
- Place of birth: Ludwigsburg, West Germany
- Height: 1.86 m (6 ft 1 in)
- Position: Goalkeeper

Youth career
- –1980: TSV Asperg
- 1980–1981: VfB Stuttgart

Senior career*
Years	Team	Apps	(Gls)
1981–1983	VfB Stuttgart II		
1983–1986	VfB Stuttgart	13	(0)
1986–1989	Stuttgarter Kickers	42	(0)
- * Club domestic league appearances and goals

Armin Jäger (born 19 September 1962) is a retired German football player. He spent four seasons in the Bundesliga with VfB Stuttgart and Stuttgarter Kickers.

== Honours ==
- Bundesliga champion: 1983–84
- DFB-Pokal finalist: 1985–86, 1986–87
