= Helmut Roleder =

German footballer

Personal information
- Date of birth: 9 October 1953 (age 73)
- Place of birth: Freital, Bezirk Dresden, East Germany
- Height: 1.86 m (6 ft 1 in)
- Position: Goalkeeper

Senior career*
Years	Team	Apps	(Gls)
1972–1986	VfB Stuttgart	347	(0)

International career
1984	West Germany	1	(0)
- * Club domestic league appearances and goals

Helmut Roleder (born 9 October 1953) is a retired German footballer who played as a goalkeeper.

== Club career ==
He spent 13 seasons in the Bundesliga with VfB Stuttgart. In 1983–84 Roleder won the West German football championship.

== International career ==
He earned one cap as a substitute for the West Germany national team in 1984 in a friendly against the Soviet Union. Roleder was included in the DFB squad for the 1984 UEFA European Football Championship, however he didn't play.

== Honours ==
=== Club ===
VfB Stuttgart

- Bundesliga: winner 1983–84; runner-up: 1978–79
- DFB-Pokal: runner-up 1985–86
