= Thomas Zechel =

German footballer

Personal information
- Date of birth: January 25, 1965 (age 61)
- Height: 1.77 m (5 ft 10 in)
- Positions: Midfielder; defender

Senior career*
Years	Team	Apps	(Gls)
1983–1988	Bayer 04 Leverkusen	70	(6)
1988–1989	Hannover 96	15	(0)
1989–1990	SV Waldhof Mannheim	7	(0)
1990–1991	FC Schalke 04	19	(1)
1991–1994	1. FC Saarbrücken	48	(2)

International career
1984	West Germany U-21	3	(0)
- * Club domestic league appearances and goals

Thomas Zechel (born January 25, 1965) is a retired German football player.

== Honours ==
- UEFA Cup winner: 1988.
