= Walter Kelsch =

German footballer

Personal information
- Date of birth: 3 September 1955 (age 71)
- Place of birth: Stuttgart, West Germany
- Height: 1.80 m (5 ft 11 in)
- Position: Forward

Senior career*
| Years | Team | Apps | (Gls) |
| 1975–1977 | Stuttgarter Kickers | 69 | (15) |
| 1977–1984 | VfB Stuttgart | 202 | (51) |
| 1984–1986 | Strasbourg | 78 | (20) |
| 1986–1988 | FC Homburg | 44 | (3) |
| 1988–1989 | Apollon Athens | 25 | (0) |
| Total | | 418 | (89) |

International career
| 1979–1980 | West Germany | 4 | (3) |
- * Club domestic league appearances and goals

Walter Kelsch (born 3 September 1955) is a German former professional footballer who played as a forward.

== Club career ==
Kelsch started his career with TSV Büsnau. Then he played for Stuttgarter Kickers and later on for VfB Stuttgart. In 246 Bundesliga matches he scored 54 goals.

In France he played 78 matches (20 goals) for RC Strasbourg. 67 (18) in the Division 1 and eleven (two) in the Division 2.

== International career ==
Kelsch won four caps (1979 and 1980) for the West Germany national team, in which he scored three goals. The matches included UEFA Euro 1980 qualifiers against Turkey and Malta and two friendlies.

== Honours ==
VfB Stuttgart

- Bundesliga: 1983–84; runner-up: 1978–79
