= Rainer Zietsch =

German footballer, manager, and athletic director

Personal information
- Date of birth: 21 November 1964 (age 61)
- Place of birth: Gauangelloch, West Germany
- Height: 1.83 m (6 ft 0 in)
- Position: Defender

Team information
- Current team: 1. FC Nürnberg (youth team athletic director)

Youth career
- 1970–1980: TSV Gauangelloch
- 1980–1982: SV Sandhausen

Senior career*
Years	Team	Apps	(Gls)
1982–1983	SV Sandhausen	7	(0)
1983–1989	VfB Stuttgart	134	(5)
1989–1991	Bayer Uerdingen	46	(6)
1991–1996	1. FC Nürnberg	140	(7)
1997–1998	Greuther Fürth	12	(0)
Total		339	(30)

International career
	West Germany U-21	4	(0)
	West Germany B	1	(0)

Managerial career
- 2000–2011: BSC Erlangen
- 2003–2004: Greuther Fürth (youth)
- 2004–2006: 1. FC Nürnberg U17
- 2006–2016: 1. FC Nürnberg (youth team athletic director)
- 2013: 1. FC Nürnberg U19
- 2016–2017: Germany U17 (assistant)
- 2017–2018: 1. SC Feucht
- 2018–2020: Würzburger Kickers (head of academy)
- 2018–2019: Würzburger Kickers II
- 2019–2020: Würzburger Kickers (assistant)
- 2019–2020: Germany U17 (assistant)
- 2020–2021: Germany U15 (assistant)
- 2021–2022: Germany U16 (assistant)
- 2022–: Germany U17 (assistant)
- * Club domestic league appearances and goals

Rainer Zietsch (born 21 November 1964) is a German football coach and a former player who is the assistant coach of Germany U17.

== Honours ==
VfB Stuttgart

- Bundesliga: 1983–84
- DFB-Pokal: runner-up 1985–86
- UEFA Cup: runner-up 1988–89
