= Gerd Zewe =

German footballer and manager

Personal information
- Date of birth: 13 June 1950 (age 76)
- Place of birth: Stennweiler, Saar Protectorate
- Height: 1.78 m (5 ft 10 in)
- Positions: Midfielder; defender

Youth career
- SV Stennweiler
- Borussia Neunkirchen

Senior career*
Years	Team	Apps	(Gls)
1972–1987	Fortuna Düsseldorf	440	(42)
1987–1988	Kickers Würzburg		

International career
1973	West Germany U-23	3	(0)
1978	West Germany B	2	(0)
1978–1979	West Germany	4	(0)

Managerial career
- 1993: Schwarz-Weiß Essen
- 1998–2001: 1. FC Union Solingen
- * Club domestic league appearances and goals

Gerd Zewe (born 13 June 1950) is a German former football player and manager.

Zewe was a youngster for SV Stennweiler and an amateur for Borussia Neunkirchen. Starting his career with his sole professional club, Fortuna Düsseldorf, in midfield, he was later used as sweeper and appeared in 440 Bundesliga matches (42 goals), which is still a Bundesliga record for the club. Zewe was part of the Düsseldorf team that reached the DFB-Pokal final on three consecutive occasions from 1978 to 1980, carrying the trophy home in 1979 and 1980. In 1979, he further won a European Cup Winners' Cup runner-up medal with Düsseldorf, getting beaten after extra-time by FC Barcelona at St. Jakob Stadium, Basel. In 1987, he left Fortuna Düsseldorf after 15 years to team up with Kickers Würzburg to see out his career on amateur level.

Zewe's career for West Germany lasted for only four matches, but earned him a role of an unused substitute at the 1978 FIFA World Cup as one of two uncapped outfield players in the West German squad besides 1. FC Köln's Harald Konopka. Months after the tournament he gained his first cap, playing in the 4–3 win over Czechoslovakia on 11 October 1978. Four months later his career for West Germany came to a close with a starting role in the goalless 1980 UEFA European Championship qualifier against Malta in Malta.

As manager, Zewe coached the reserve-side of Borussia Mönchengladbach for some time in the 1990s, as well as the first squads of lower level clubs Union Solingen and TuS Grevenbroich.

== Personal life ==
Zewe is the father of two sons, Niki and Tommy.
