= Peter Reichert =

German footballer

Personal information
- Date of birth: 4 August 1961 (age 65)
- Place of birth: Bretten, West Germany
- Height: 1.82 m (6 ft 0 in)
- Position: Forward

Senior career*
Years	Team	Apps	(Gls)
1979–1981	VfB Stuttgart II		
1981–1986	VfB Stuttgart	139	(42)
1986–1989	Strasbourg	94	(40)
1989–1990	Toulouse	18	(2)
1990–1992	Karlsruher SC	36	(6)

International career
1982–1984	West Germany U-21	15	(3)
- * Club domestic league appearances and goals

Peter Reichert (born 4 August 1961) is a German former professional footballer who played as a forward.

== Honours ==
VfB Stuttgart

- Bundesliga: 1983–84
- DFB-Pokal: runner-up 1985–86
