= Karl Allgöwer =

German footballer

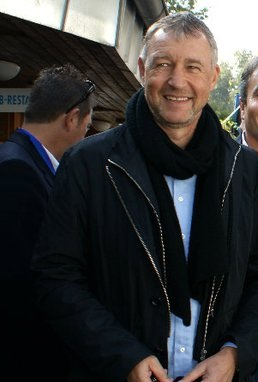

Personal information
- Date of birth: 5 January 1957 (age 69)
- Place of birth: Geislingen an der Steige, West Germany
- Height: 1.86 m (6 ft 1 in)
- Position: Midfielder

Youth career
- SV Altenstadt
- SC Geislingen

Senior career*
Years	Team	Apps	(Gls)
1977–1980	Stuttgarter Kickers	116	(59)
1980–1991	VfB Stuttgart	338	(129)
Total		454	(188)

International career
1980–1986	West Germany	10	(0)
1980–1982	West Germany B	2	(1)
- * Club domestic league appearances and goals

Karl Allgöwer (born 5 January 1957) is a German former professional footballer who played as a midfielder. He played most of his career at VfB Stuttgart, winning the Bundesliga in 1984. Allgöwer was part of the German silver squad for the 1986 FIFA World Cup.

== Club career ==
Growing up in Geislingen an der Steige, Allgöwer completed his youth years with SV Altenstadt and SC Geislingen before moving to Stuttgart to score 59 goals for 2. Bundesliga team Stuttgarter Kickers from 1977 to 1980 as striker. Local rival VfB Stuttgart paid Kickers 750,000 Deutsche Mark to team him up with their Bundesliga squad. Just a few matches for them, he got selected for the B-international team of Germany, impressing as a goalscoring midfielder. His immediate progress earned him a call-up from Jupp Derwall for Germany. In Hanover they faced France in November 1980 and Allgöwer was having a bright debut, playing on the right in midfield and cementing his ambitions. Subsequent to him taking part regularly for Germany on their way to the 1982 FIFA World Cup, his participation in that tournament was expected. However, Allgöwer retired from playing for West Germany before the World Cup.

Allgöwer's international retirement of 1982 lasted for three years. Three years in which he once won the Bundesliga title with Stuttgart (in 1984) and in which he massively expanded his importance for his club. Franz Beckenbauer, successor of Jupp Derwall at the helm of the German team in 1984, attempted to lure the strong shooting player out of that retirement, but Beckenbauer had to wait until October 1985 to see Allgöwer return for the World Cup qualifier against Portugal (0–1), which ironically took place at VfB Stuttgart's Neckarstadion. He kept on for West Germany then, declaring his final international retirement after staying unused in the 1986 FIFA World Cup runner-up campaign of Germany. He collected 10 caps.

On club level he remained a key player for his sole team, switching to a sweeper role later on. Karl's brother Ralf also played a few matches for Stuttgart in these years, but never gaining the status Karl had for his coaches and the Stuttgart supporters. In 1989, the powerful free-kick specialist was part of the Stuttgart XI with Guido Buchwald and Jürgen Klinsmann that got defeated by Diego Maradona's SSC Napoli in the UEFA Cup final. After 338 Bundesliga matches Allgöwer said farewell to the German top division in the summer of 1991.

== Honours ==
VfB Stuttgart

- UEFA Cup runner-up: 1988–89
- Bundesliga: 1983–84
- DFB-Pokal runner-up: 1985–86

West Germany

- FIFA World Cup runner-up: 1986
