= Hermann Ohlicher =

German footballer

Personal information
- Date of birth: 2 November 1949 (age 76)
- Place of birth: Bräunlingen, West Germany
- Height: 1.75 m (5 ft 9 in)
- Positions: Midfielder; striker

Senior career*
| Years | Team | Apps | (Gls) |
| –1973 | FV Ravensburg | | |
| 1973–1985 | VfB Stuttgart | 390 | (126) |
- * Club domestic league appearances and goals

Hermann Ohlicher (born 2 November 1949 in Bräunlingen) is a former German football player.

He spent ten seasons in the Bundesliga with VfB Stuttgart, playing 318 matches in the West German top-flight.

== Honours ==
VfB Stuttgart

- Bundesliga: 1983–84
