= Ásgeir Sigurvinsson =

Icelandic footballer and coach

Personal information
- Full name: Ásgeir Sigurvinsson
- Date of birth: 8 May 1955 (age 71)
- Place of birth: Vestmannaeyjar, Iceland
- Height: 1.82 m (6 ft 0 in)
- Position: Midfielder

Senior career*
| Years | Team | Apps | (Gls) |
| 1971–1973 | ÍBV Vestmannaeyjar | 21 | (7) |
| 1973–1981 | Standard Liège | 249 | (57) |
| 1981–1982 | Bayern Munich | 17 | (1) |
| 1982–1990 | VfB Stuttgart | 194 | (38) |
| Total | | 481 | (103) |

International career
| 1972–1989 | Iceland | 45 | (5) |

Managerial career
- 1993: Fram
- 2003–2005: Iceland
- * Club domestic league appearances and goals

Ásgeir "Sigi" Sigurvinsson (born 8 May 1955 in Vestmannaeyjar) is an Icelandic retired football attacking midfielder and coach.

He spent most of his career at Standard Liège and in Germany, amassing Bundesliga totals of 211 games and 39 goals for two clubs, mainly Stuttgart.

== Club career ==
One of the first Icelandic footballers to play in a foreign country, Ásgeir played a single game for Rangers' reserve side in late 1972 before moving to Belgian club Standard Liège in 1973. He stayed there for eight seasons, amassing more than 300 appearances overall and helping it to the 1981 Belgian Cup. Immediately after, he was bought by FC Bayern Munich. He played 17 times in his first season, scoring once. He was an unused substitute in the 1982 European Cup final and was the only non-German in the squad that day, but only stayed with the club for one year.

Ásgeir then joined fellow Bundesliga team VfB Stuttgart, where he figured prominently until his retirement at 35. In his second year he scored a career-best – in Germany – 12 goals, being instrumental in a league conquest after a 32-year wait.

During his penultimate season, Ásgeir netted three times from 28 appearances as the Roten finished fifth, still adding all 12 matches (ten complete) in the side's runner-up run in the UEFA Cup. After retiring, he worked at Stuttgart for another three years, as a scout.

Between April and November 1993, Ásgeir had his first coaching experience, with Knattspyrnufélagið Fram.

== International career ==
Ásgeir gained 45 caps for Iceland and scored five goals, his debut coming on 3 July 1972 at only 17 in a 2–5 friendly home loss against Denmark. He acted as technical director at the Football Association of Iceland for six years, and later coached the national team from 2003 until late 2005.

In November 2003, to celebrate UEFA's 50 anniversary, the Icelandic FA selected Ásgeir as its Golden Player, the most outstanding Icelandic player of the last 50 years.

== Honours ==
ÍBV

- Icelandic Cup: 1972

Standard Liège

- Belgian Cup: 1980–81

Bayern Munich

- DFB-Pokal: 1981–82

Stuttgart

- Bundesliga: 1983–84

Individual

- Kicker Bundesliga Team of the Season: 1983–84, 1985-1986
