= Andreas Müller (footballer, born 1962) =

German footballer

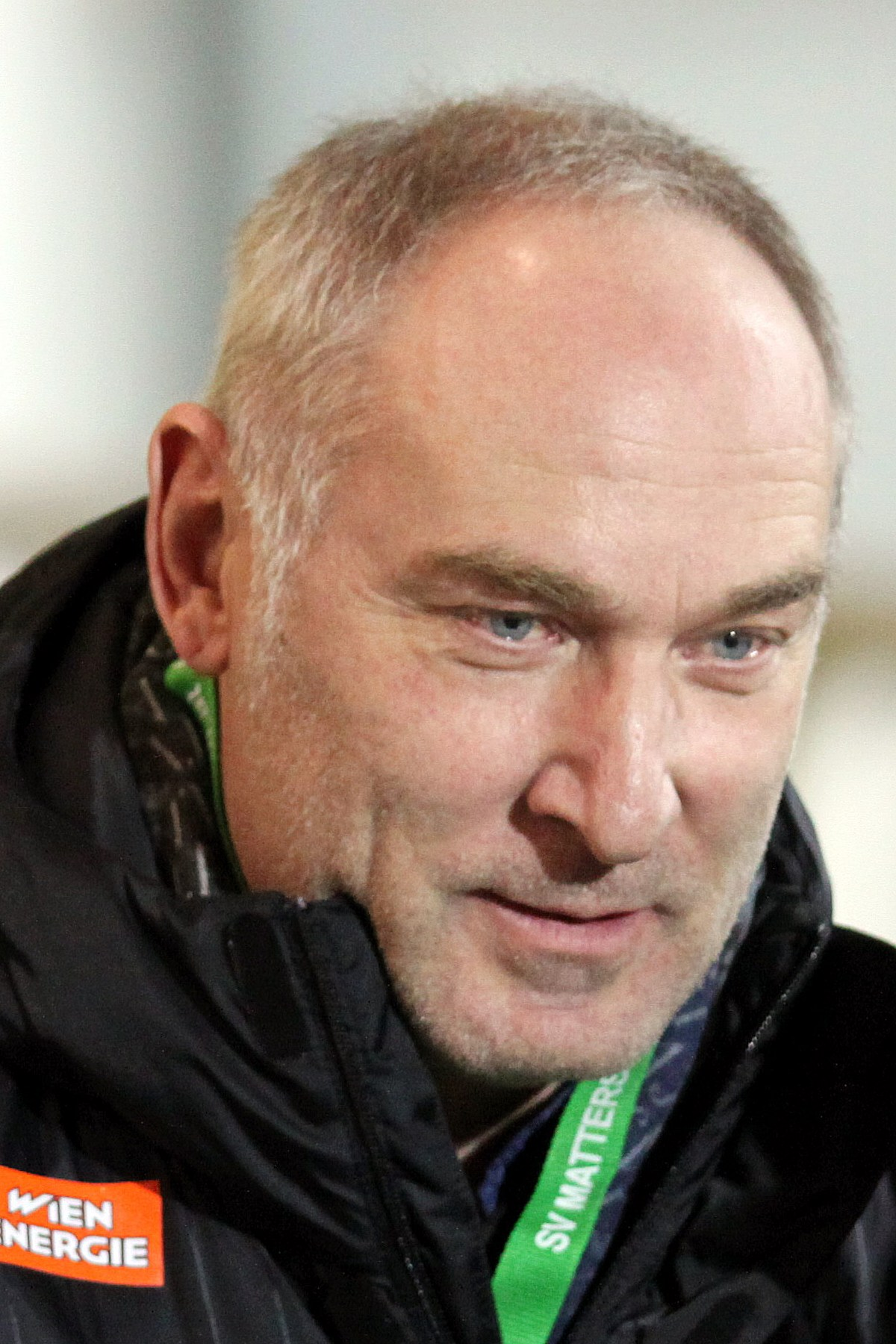

Personal information
- Full name: Andreas Müller
- Date of birth: 13 December 1962 (age 63)
- Place of birth: Stuttgart, West Germany
- Height: 1.80 m (5 ft 11 in)
- Position: Midfielder

Senior career*
Years	Team	Apps	(Gls)
1983–1987	VfB Stuttgart	111	(13)
1987–1988	Hannover 96	27	(2)
1988–2000	Schalke 04	266	(30)
- * Club domestic league appearances and goals

Andreas Müller (born 13 December 1962 in Stuttgart) is a German former footballer who played mainly as a defensive midfielder.

== Football career ==
Müller started his professional career at hometown's VfB Stuttgart, where he remained four seasons; in his first season, he netted five times in 20 league matches, helping the club clinch the title (with the title decided on goal difference, he found the net in consecutive 6–0 routings, against Fortuna Düsseldorf and at 1. FC Nürnberg, in April 1984).

After a sole year at Hannover 96, he transferred to FC Schalke 04, then in the second division. During the following 12 years (11 of those as a regular first-team member), Müller helped the side win the 1996–97 UEFA Cup (appearing in 11 matches during the victorious campaign). While at Schalke, he also won the "Goal of the Year" award in 1991. Müller eventually retired in 2000 at almost 38, having amassed 338 topflight matches and 32 goals.

Müller's first off-field role was as director of football at FC Schalke 04 from 2000 on. After Schalke's general manager Rudi Assauer stepped down in May 2006, Müller took over the position. He was sacked in March 2009.

On 18 September 2012, TSG 1899 Hoffenheim appointed Müller as their new general manager. He and coach Marco Kurz were sacked on 2 April 2013.

Müller returned to football in December 2013 after being announced as the new Director of Football by Austria's most successful club SK Rapid Vienna, where he replaced the outgoing Helmut Schulte.

== Honours ==
- Goal of the Year (Germany): 1991
