= Guido Buchwald =

German footballer

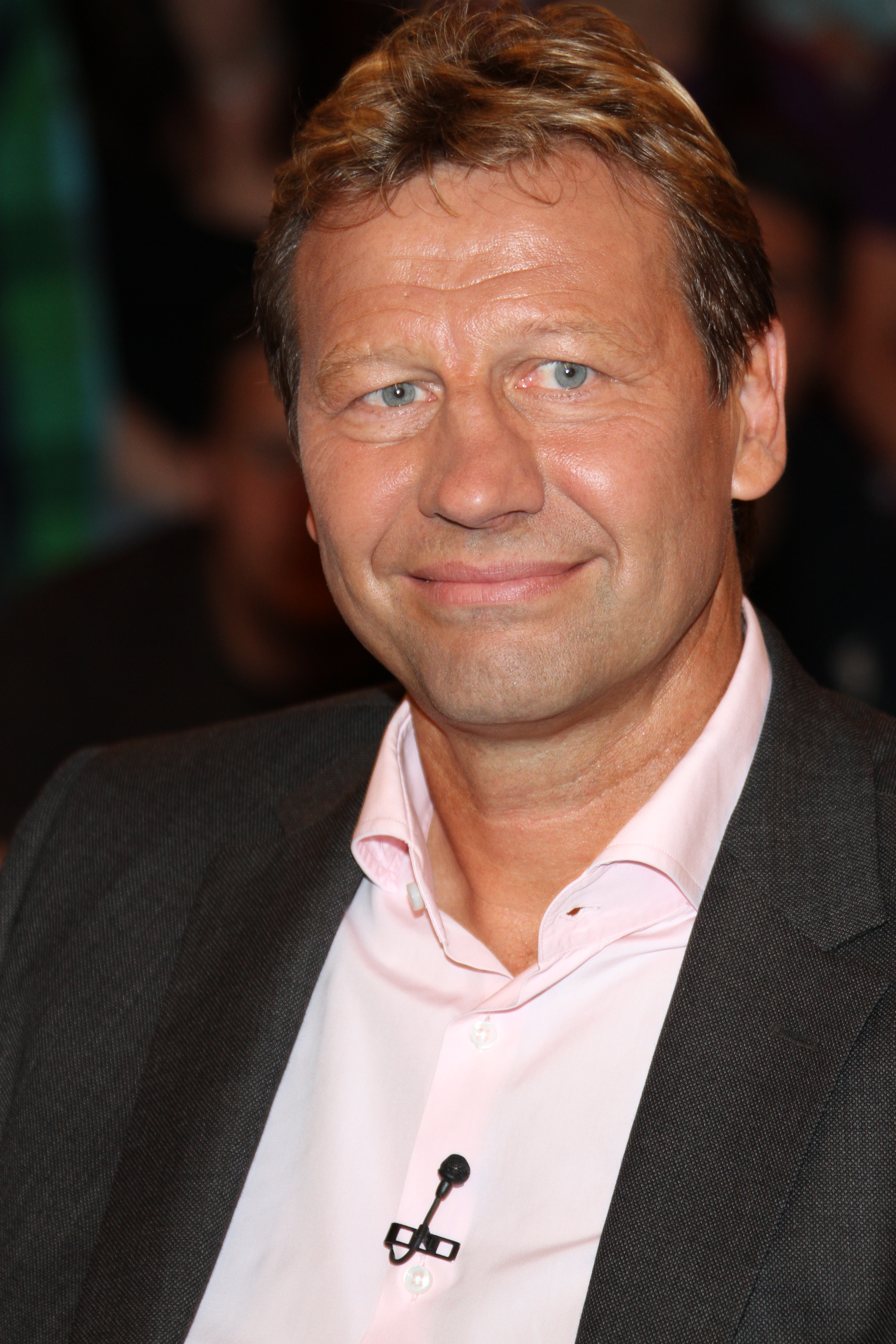
- Buchwald in 2012

Personal information
- Full name: Guido Ulrich Buchwald
- Date of birth: 24 January 1961 (age 65)
- Place of birth: West Berlin, West Germany
- Height: 1.88 m (6 ft 2 in)
- Position: Defender

Team information
- Current team: Stuttgarter Kickers (director of football)

Youth career
- 1969–1977: SV Wannweil
- 1977–1978: TSV Pliezhausen
- 1978–1979: Stuttgarter Kickers

Senior career*
Years	Team	Apps	(Gls)
1979–1983	Stuttgarter Kickers	146	(18)
1983–1994	VfB Stuttgart	325	(28)
1994–1997	Urawa Red Diamonds	127	(11)
1997–1999	Karlsruher SC	40	(3)
Total		638	(60)

International career
1980	West Germany U21	1	(0)
1983–1984	West Germany Olympic	9	(1)
1984–1994	West Germany/Germany	76	(4)

Managerial career
- 2004–2006: Urawa Red Diamonds
- 2007: Alemannia Aachen
- 2012: Stuttgarter Kickers (interim)
Medal record
Men's football
Representing Germany
FIFA World Cup
Winner	1990 Italy
UEFA European Championship
Runner-up	1992 Sweden
- * Club domestic league appearances and goals

Guido Ulrich Buchwald (born 24 January 1961) is a German former professional football player. Throughout his career he played as a defender. He is currently director of football of Stuttgarter Kickers.

The best game of Buchwald's career was the final of the 1990 FIFA World Cup victory for West Germany against Argentina where he effectively marked Diego Maradona for almost the entire match, earning him the nickname "Diego". His other nickname, 'Bucky' is due to his surname. He was also part of Germany's disappointing 1994 FIFA World Cup campaign and collected in his career 76 caps.

== Playing career ==
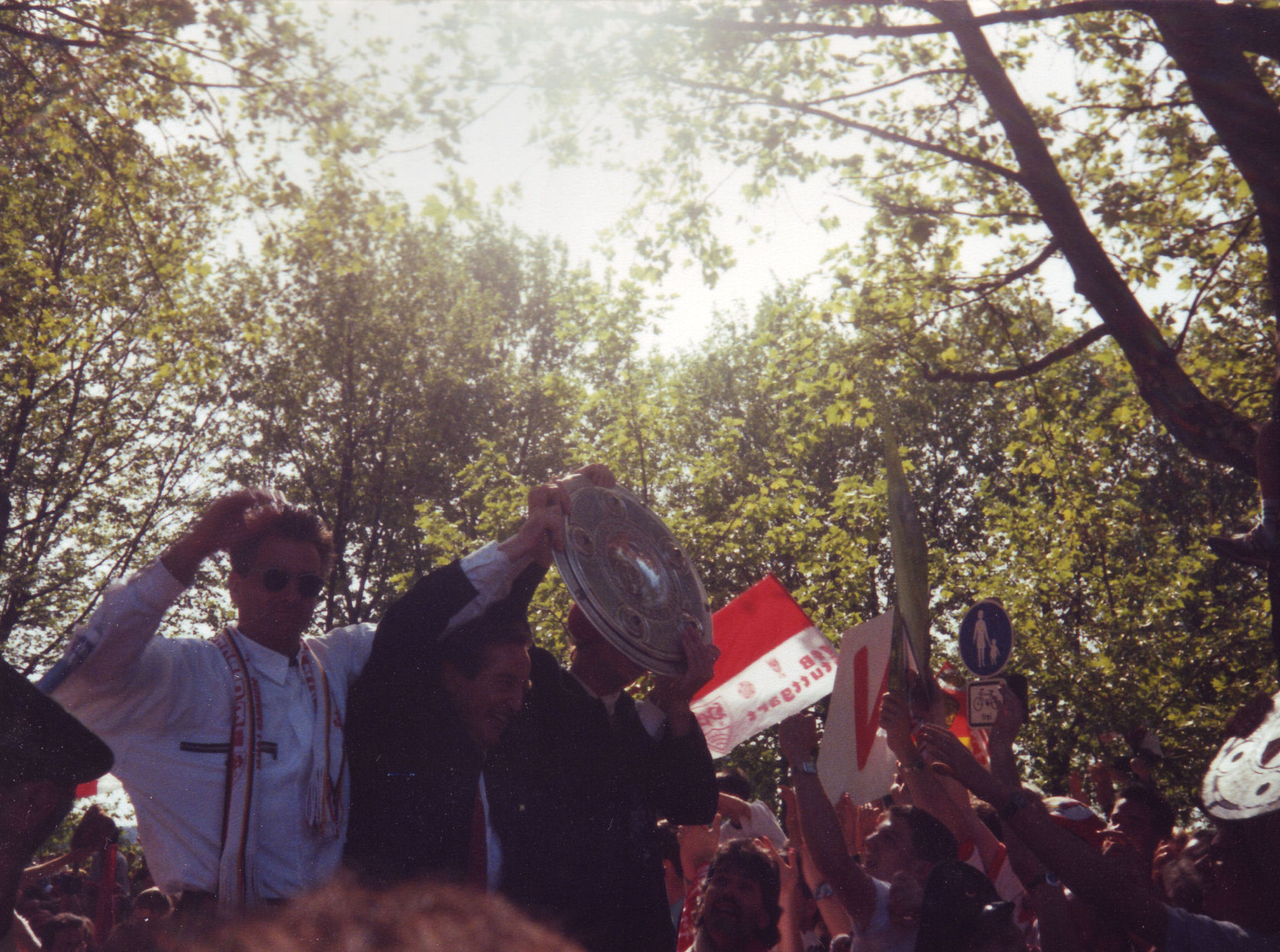
Immel (left), club president Mayer-Vorfelder (center) and Buchwald celebrate VfB's 1991–92 Bundesliga title triumph alongside the supporters

Buchwald began his professional football career in 1983 with VfB Stuttgart. He played 325 games in the German Bundesliga for this club, scoring 28 goals. The low-point of his career was in 1986 when coach Franz Beckenbauer did not include him in his team for the World Cup in Mexico. He was however part of the squad which won the World Cup in Italy four years later.

The same year Stuttgart lost the final of the German Cup against Bayern Munich and in 1989 the final of the UEFA Cup was also lost, but they managed to win two German championships (1984, 1992).

His personal highlight in his Bundesliga career was on the last day of play in the 1991–92 season, when he scored the deciding goal against Bayer Leverkusen that won Stuttgart the match and the Championship – just six minutes before the games' end.

In 1994, he signed with the Japanese team Urawa Red Diamonds before returning to Germany in 1998 to help Karlsruher SC avoid relegation. He could not save the team and after one more season playing in the second division he retired but stayed with the club as a director of sports.

== Managerial career ==
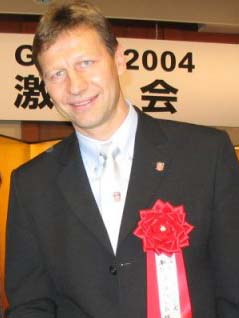
Buchwald during his presentation as Urawa Red Diamonds manager in 2004

After a stop with the Stuttgarter Kickers (again as director of sports) he went back to Japan where he was managing his old club. He led his team to the "closing" championship. In 2005, won the title on Emperor's Cup. In 2006, he won the title on both J-League and Emperor's Cup.

Buchwald then returned to Germany to become manager of Alemannia Aachen. After five months on duty he was fired by club management on 26 November 2007.

On 1 November 2010, Buchwald returned to the Stuttgarter Kickers as a member of the board responsible for the first team. He took over as interim manager in November 2012 after the sacking of Dirk Schuster, before relinquishing this duty a month later when Gerd Dais was appointed.

== Career statistics ==
=== Club ===
Appearances and goals by club, season and competition
Club	Season	League			National Cup		League Cup		Continental		Total	
Club	Season	Division	Apps	Goals	Apps	Goals	Apps	Goals	Apps	Goals	Apps	Goals
Stuttgarter Kickers	1979–80	2. Bundesliga	33	1	1	0	—		—		34	1
Stuttgarter Kickers	1980–81	2. Bundesliga	38	8	1	0	—		—		39	8
Stuttgarter Kickers	1981–82	2. Bundesliga	38	5	1	0	—		1	0	40	5
Stuttgarter Kickers	1982–83	2. Bundesliga	37	4	2	0	—		—		39	4
Stuttgarter Kickers	Total		146	18	5	0	—		1	0	152	18
VfB Stuttgart	1983–84	Bundesliga	34	3	5	3	—		1	0	40	6
VfB Stuttgart	1984–85	Bundesliga	15	4	2	0	—		—		17	4
VfB Stuttgart	1985–86	Bundesliga	32	1	6	2	—		—		38	3
VfB Stuttgart	1986–87	Bundesliga	33	2	1	0	—		4	0	38	2
VfB Stuttgart	1987–88	Bundesliga	30	1	1	0	—		—		31	1
VfB Stuttgart	1988–89	Bundesliga	30	1	5	2	—		10	0	45	3
VfB Stuttgart	1989–90	Bundesliga	28	5	3	3	—		5	1	36	9
VfB Stuttgart	1990–91	Bundesliga	21	3	4	1	—		—		25	4
VfB Stuttgart	1991–92	Bundesliga	37	5	4	1	—		4	2	45	8
VfB Stuttgart	1992–93	Bundesliga	33	1	2	0	—		3	0	39^{1}	2^{1}
VfB Stuttgart	1993–94	Bundesliga	32	2	1	1	—		—		33	3
VfB Stuttgart	Total		325	28	34	13			27	3	387	45
Urawa Reds	1994	J1 League	20	2	3	0	2	0	—		25	2
Urawa Reds	1995	J1 League	51	4	3	0	-		—		54	4
Urawa Reds	1996	J1 League	24	3	4	0	12	0	—		40	3
Urawa Reds	1997	J1 League	32	2	0	0	6	0	—		38	2
Urawa Reds	Total		127	11	10	0	20	0	—		157	11
Karlsruher SC	1997–98	Bundesliga	9	0	—		—		—		9	0
Karlsruher SC	1998–99	2. Bundesliga	31	3	1	0	—		—		32	3
Karlsruher SC	Total		40	3	1	0	—		—		41	3
Career total			638	60	50	13	20	0	28	3	737	77

- ^{1} Including 1 match and 1 goal in 1992 DFB-Supercup.

=== International ===
Appearances and goals by national team and year
National team	Year	Apps	Goals
Germany	1984	3	0
Germany	1985	0	0
Germany	1986	7	0
Germany	1987	7	0
Germany	1988	6	0
Germany	1989	6	0
Germany	1990	12	0
Germany	1991	6	1
Germany	1992	13	1
Germany	1993	10	2
Germany	1994	6	0
Total		76	4

=== Coaching ===
As of 11 May 2012

Team	From	To	Record				
Team	From	To	G	W	D	L	Win %
Karlsruher SC	16 October 1999	24 October 1999	2	0	0	2	0.00
Urawa Reds	1 January 2004	31 December 2006	98	58	19	21	59.18
Alemannia Aachen	1 July 2007	26 November 2007	14	5	4	5	35.71
Total			114	63	23	28	55.26

== Honours ==
=== As a player ===
VfB Stuttgart

- Bundesliga: 1983–84, 1991–92
- DFL-Supercup: 1992
- DFB-Pokal runner-up: 1985–86
- UEFA Cup runner-up: 1988–89

Germany

- FIFA World Cup: 1990

Individual

- FIFA World Cup All-Star Team: 1990
- kicker Bundesliga Team of the Season: 1989–90, 1993–94
- J.League Best XI: 1995, 1996

=== As a manager ===
Urawa Red Diamonds

- J.League Division 1: 2006
- Emperor's Cup: 2005, 2006
- Xerox Super Cup: 2006

Individual

- J.League Manager of the Year: 2006
