= Günther Schäfer =

German footballer and coach

Personal information
- Date of birth: 9 June 1962 (age 64)
- Place of birth: Waiblingen, West Germany
- Height: 1.74 m (5 ft 9 in)
- Position: Defender

Team information
- Current team: VfB Stuttgart (youth coach)

Youth career
- –1975: TSV Neustadt
- 1975–1980: VfB Stuttgart

Senior career*
Years	Team	Apps	(Gls)
1980–1996	VfB Stuttgart	331	(9)
1996–1998	Arminia Bielefeld	42	(0)
Total		373	(9)

International career
1981–1984	West Germany U-21	15	(0)

Managerial career
- 2004–2005: VfB Stuttgart (assistant)
- * Club domestic league appearances and goals

Günther Schäfer (born 9 June 1962 in Waiblingen) is a German football coach and a former player.

In his sixteen years playing for VfB Stuttgart, the defender gained the status of being one of the most popular players ever to play for the Swabian Bundesliga side and one of the few players to earn two German championship titles with them. The most spectacular and well-known play of Schäfer's career was to clear a ball from the goal line by a bicycle kick, risking injury, in the final match of the 1991–92 season against Bayer Leverkusen, which Stuttgart went on to win 2–1, thus gaining the German championship title that season.

Today, Schäfer is the head coach of VfB's youth academy.

== Honours ==
VfB Stuttgart

- UEFA Cup finalist: 1989
- Bundesliga: 1984, 1992
- DFB-Pokal finalist: 1986
- DFL-Supercup: 1992
