= 1974–75 VfL Bochum season =

VfL Bochum
1974–75 season
- President: Ottokar Wüst
- Head Coach: Heinz Höher
- Stadium: Stadion an der Castroper Straße
- Bundesliga: 11th
- DFB-Pokal: Fourth round
- Top goalscorer: League: Werner Balte (14); All: Werner Balte (14)
- Highest home attendance: 34,000 (vs. FC Bayern Munich, 29 November 1974)
- Lowest home attendance: 10,000 (vs. Tennis Borussia Berlin, 1 April 1975; Kickers Offenbach, 7 June 1975)
- Average home league attendance: 17,635
Home colours	Away colours	Third colours

The 1974–75 VfL Bochum season was the 37th season in club history.

== Matches ==
=== Legend ===
Win Draw Loss

=== Bundesliga ===
24 August 1974 1	VfB Stuttgart	1–0	VfL Bochum	Stuttgart
15:30	Weller 76' (pen.)			Stadium: Neckarstadion; Attendance: 20,000; Referee: Hermann Schröder (Lahnstein)

31 August 1974 2	VfL Bochum	3–2	1. FC Köln	Bochum
15:30	Balte 24' (pen.); Eggert 44'; Kaczor 74'		Müller 7'; Löhr 35'	Stadium: Stadion an der Castroper Straße; Attendance: 20,000; Referee: Wilfried Haselberger (Reutlingen)

11 September 1974 3	Wuppertaler SV	1–1	VfL Bochum	Wuppertal
20:00	Gerber 53'		Holz 61'	Stadium: Stadion am Zoo; Attendance: 12,000; Referee: Gert Meuser (Ingelheim)

14 September 1974 4	VfL Bochum	2–1	FC Schalke 04	Bochum
15:30	Balte 28'; Kaczor 58'		Abramczik 8'	Stadium: Stadion an der Castroper Straße; Attendance: 29,800; Referee: Volker Roth (Salzgitter)

21 September 1974 5	Eintracht Braunschweig	2–0	VfL Bochum	Braunschweig
15:30	Merkhoffer 43'; Gersdorff 72'			Stadium: Eintracht-Stadion; Attendance: 23,000; Referee: Günter Linn (Altendiez)

28 September 1974 6	VfL Bochum	3–1	SV Werder Bremen	Bochum
15:30	Balte 29' (pen.); Kaczor 70'; Tenhagen 77'		Ohling 90'	Stadium: Stadion an der Castroper Straße; Attendance: 11,000; Referee: Jürgen Meßmer (Mannheim)

5 October 1974 7	Borussia Mönchengladbach	3–0	VfL Bochum	Mönchengladbach
15:30	Jensen 32', 42'; Simonsen 54' (pen.)			Stadium: Bökelbergstadion; Attendance: 13,100; Referee: Wolfgang Dittmer (Mutterstadt)

9 October 1974 8	VfL Bochum	3–1	Eintracht Frankfurt	Bochum
20:00	Holz 38'; Lameck 45' (pen.); Tenhagen 57'		Rohrbach 81'	Stadium: Stadion an der Castroper Straße; Attendance: 20,000; Referee: Klaus Ohmsen (Hamburg)

12 October 1974 9	Tennis Borussia Berlin	2–0	VfL Bochum	West Berlin
15:30	Sprenger 66'; Stolzenburg 90'			Stadium: Olympic Stadium; Attendance: 6,500; Referee: Walter Horstmann (Hildesheim)

19 October 1974 10	VfL Bochum	4–0	1. FC Kaiserslautern	Bochum
15:30	Kaczor 13', 30'; Eggeling 17'; Balte 43' (pen.)			Stadium: Stadion an der Castroper Straße; Attendance: 12,000; Referee: Peter Gabor (West Berlin)

2 November 1974 11	MSV Duisburg	3–1	VfL Bochum	Duisburg
14:30	Bella 26'; Thies 36'; Seliger 71'		Eggert 7'	Stadium: Wedaustadion; Attendance: 13,000; Referee: Herbert Lutz (Bremen)

9 November 1974 12	VfL Bochum	2–2	Rot-Weiss Essen	Bochum
15:30	Holz 28'; Tenhagen 40'		Fürhoff 13'; Erlhoff 63'	Stadium: Stadion an der Castroper Straße; Attendance: 17,000; Referee: Karl-Heinz Picker (Hamburg)

16 November 1974 13	VfL Bochum	4–2	Hamburger SV	Bochum
15:30	Köper 10'; Kaczor 48', 58'; Balte 69'		Volkert 22'; Reimann 47'	Stadium: Stadion an der Castroper Straße; Attendance: 15,000; Referee: Karl Riegg (Augsburg)

23 November 1974 14	Fortuna Düsseldorf	0–1	VfL Bochum	Düsseldorf
15:30			Balte 67'	Stadium: Rheinstadion; Attendance: 18,000; Referee: Max Klauser (Munich)

29 November 1974 15	VfL Bochum	3–0	FC Bayern Munich	Bochum
20:00	Kaczor 7'; Balte 15' (pen.), 51'			Stadium: Stadion an der Castroper Straße; Attendance: 34,000; Referee: Peter Gabor (West Berlin)

6 December 1974 16	Kickers Offenbach	2–0	VfL Bochum	Offenbach am Main
20:00	Ritschel 8' (pen.); Hickersberger 60'			Stadium: Stadion am Bieberer Berg; Attendance: 20,000; Referee: Klaus Ohmsen (Hamburg)

14 December 1974 17	VfL Bochum	4–0	Hertha BSC	Bochum
15:30	Kaczor 59'; Köper 65'; Lameck 86'; Franke 89'			Stadium: Stadion an der Castroper Straße; Attendance: 18,000; Referee: Alfons Betz (Regensburg)

25 January 1975 18	VfL Bochum	1–0	VfB Stuttgart	Bochum
15:30	Balte 53'			Stadium: Stadion an der Castroper Straße; Attendance: 11,000; Referee: Walter Horstmann (Hildesheim)

1 February 1975 19	1. FC Köln	4–1	VfL Bochum	Cologne
15:30	Neumann 8'; Müller 29'; Overath 35'; Glowacz 43'		Eggeling 71'	Stadium: Radrennbahn Müngersdorf; Attendance: 21,000; Referee: Herbert Lutz (Bremen)

15 February 1975 20	VfL Bochum	4–2	Wuppertaler SV	Bochum
15:30	Balte 15', 73' (pen.); Köper 17', 34'		Nagy 29'; Gerber 38'	Stadium: Stadion an der Castroper Straße; Attendance: 14,000; Referee: Heinz Quindeau (Ludwigshafen)

22 February 1975 21	FC Schalke 04	1–0	VfL Bochum	Gelsenkirchen
15:30	Fischer 12'			Stadium: Parkstadion; Attendance: 55,000; Referee: Jürgen Meßmer (Mannheim)

1 March 1975 22	VfL Bochum	1–0	Eintracht Braunschweig	Bochum
15:30	Balte 83'			Stadium: Stadion an der Castroper Straße; Attendance: 20,000; Referee: Kurt Tschenscher (Mannheim)

8 March 1975 23	SV Werder Bremen	3–0	VfL Bochum	Bremen
15:30	Røntved 11'; Weist 60'; Bracht 67'			Stadium: Weserstadion; Attendance: 14,000; Referee: Ferdinand Biwersi (Bliesransbach)

22 March 1975 24	VfL Bochum	0–0	Borussia Mönchengladbach	Bochum
15:30				Stadium: Stadion an der Castroper Straße; Attendance: 29,000; Referee: Karl Riegg (Augsburg)

22 April 1975 25	Eintracht Frankfurt	4–1	VfL Bochum	Frankfurt am Main
20:00	Lorenz 12', 15', 82'; Hölzenbein 40'		Dewinski 42'	Stadium: Waldstadion; Attendance: 12,000; Referee: Dietrich Basedow (Hamburg)

1 April 1975 26	VfL Bochum	0–0	Tennis Borussia Berlin	Bochum
20:00				Stadium: Stadion an der Castroper Straße; Attendance: 10,000; Referee: Max Klauser (Munich)

5 April 1975 27	1. FC Kaiserslautern	1–0	VfL Bochum	Kaiserslautern
15:30	Melzer 52'			Stadium: Betzenbergstadion; Attendance: 10,000; Referee: Alfons Betz (Regensburg)

19 April 1975 28	VfL Bochum	1–2	MSV Duisburg	Bochum
15:30	Bruckmann 84' (o.g.)		Büssers 1', 43'	Stadium: Stadion an der Castroper Straße; Attendance: 12,000; Referee: Udo Zuchantke (West Berlin)

3 May 1975 29	Rot-Weiss Essen	1–1	VfL Bochum	Essen
15:30	Wieczorkowski 47'		Versen 83'	Stadium: Georg-Melches-Stadion; Attendance: 10,000; Referee: Paul Kindervater (Cologne)

10 May 1975 30	Hamburger SV	3–2	VfL Bochum	Hamburg
15:30	Zaczyk 35'; Memering 59'; Bertl 85'		Holz 28'; Pochstein 66'	Stadium: Volksparkstadion; Attendance: 12,000; Referee: Heinz Quindeau (Ludwigshafen)

24 May 1975 31	VfL Bochum	4–2	Fortuna Düsseldorf	Bochum
15:30	Tenhagen 7'; Köper 55'; Balte 69', 89' (pen.)		Brei 44', 75'	Stadium: Stadion an der Castroper Straße; Attendance: 17,000; Referee: Udo Zuchantke (West Berlin)

31 May 1975 32	FC Bayern Munich	2–1	VfL Bochum	Munich
15:30	Schwarzenbeck 54'; Müller 79'		Holz 39'	Stadium: Olympiastadion; Attendance: 25,000; Referee: Wolfgang Dittmer (Mutterstadt)

7 June 1975 33	VfL Bochum	3–1	Kickers Offenbach	Bochum
15:30	Holz 42'; Lameck 60' (pen.), 64'		Kostedde 40'	Stadium: Stadion an der Castroper Straße; Attendance: 10,000; Referee: Dietrich Basedow (Hamburg)

14 June 1975 34	Hertha BSC	4–2	VfL Bochum	West Berlin
15:30	Grau 8'; Beer 28'; Müller 45' (pen.); Sidka 64'		Holz 77' (pen.); Kaczor 82'	Stadium: Olympiastadion; Attendance: 25,000; Referee: Rudolf Frickel (Munich)

=== DFB-Pokal ===
7 September 1974 R1	SC Herford	0–3	VfL Bochum	Herford
			Stremming 26' (o.g.); Holz 28'; Tenhagen 48'	Attendance: 6,500; Referee: Dieter Stäglich (Bonn)

25 October 1974 R2	FC Bayern Hof	2–2 (a.e.t.)	VfL Bochum	Hof
	Werner 51'; Schuster 54'		Fromm 15'; Lameck 78' (pen.)	Stadium: Stadion Grüne Au; Attendance: 5,000; Referee: Dieter Berner (Enzberg)

21 December 1974 R2 Replay	VfL Bochum	5–0	FC Bayern Hof	Bochum
	Tenhagen 3'; Fromm 33', 47'; Pochstein 72'; Köper 86'			Stadium: Stadion an der Castroper Straße; Attendance: 10,000; Referee: Volker Roth (Salzgitter)

8 February 1975 R3	Bayer 05 Uerdingen	0–2	VfL Bochum	Uerdingen
			Kaczor 57', 82'	Attendance: 10,300; Referee: Dieter Dreher (Darmstadt)

15 March 1975 R4	Eintracht Frankfurt	1–0	VfL Bochum	Frankfurt am Main
	Weidle 40'			Stadium: Waldstadion; Attendance: 15,000; Referee: Heinz Quindeau (Ludwigshafen)

== Squad ==
=== Squad and statistics ===
==== Squad, appearances and goals scored ====
No.	Pos	Nat	Player	Total		Bundesliga		DFB-Pokal	
No.	Pos	Nat	Player	Apps	Goals	Apps	Goals	Apps	Goals
	MF	(West Germany) FRG	Werner Balte	39	14	34	14	5	0
	GK	(West Germany) FRG	Hans-Jürgen Bradler	3	0	2	0	1	0
	DF	(West Germany) FRG	Klaus-Dieter Dewinski	10	1	9	1	1	0
	FW	(West Germany) FRG	Heinz-Werner Eggeling	24	2	21	2	3	0
	DF	(West Germany) FRG	Michael Eggert	34	2	29	2	5	0
	DF	(West Germany) FRG	Harry Fechner	0	0	0	0	0	0
	DF	(West Germany) FRG	Klaus Franke	38	1	34	1	4	0
	DF	(West Germany) FRG	Hartmut Fromm	33	3	28	0	5	3
	DF	(West Germany) FRG	Erwin Galeski	3	0	2	0	1	0
	FW	(West Germany) FRG	Hermann Gerland	10	0	9	0	1	0
	MF	(West Germany) FRG	Paul Holz	38	8	34	7	4	1
	MF	(West Germany) FRG	Gisbert Horsthemke	2	0	2	0	0	0
	FW	(West Germany) FRG	Josef Kaczor	37	12	33	10	4	2
	MF	(West Germany) FRG	Hans-Jürgen Köper	29	6	24	5	5	1
	FW	(West Germany) FRG	Peter Kursinski	0	0	0	0	0	0
	MF	(West Germany) FRG	Michael Lameck	39	5	34	4	5	1
	FW	(West Germany) FRG	Hans-Joachim Pochstein	19	2	16	1	3	1
	GK	(West Germany) FRG	Werner Scholz	37	0	33	0	4	0
	MF	(West Germany) FRG	Franz-Josef Tenhagen	37	6	33	4	4	2
	DF	(West Germany) FRG	Dieter Versen	33	1	28	1	5	0

=== Transfers ===
==== Summer ====
In:

No.	Pos.	Nation	Player
—	DF	FRG	Klaus Franke (form Schwarz-Weiss Essen)
—	MF	FRG	Paul Holz (form FC Schalke 04)
—	MF	FRG	Gisbert Horsthemke (form SV Eintracht Heessen)
—	FW	FRG	Josef Kaczor (form SV Eintracht Heessen)
—	FW	FRG	Peter Kursinski (form VfL Bochum II)
—	FW	FRG	Hans-Joachim Pochstein (form BV Brambauer)

Out:

No.	Pos.	Nation	Player
—	GK	FRG	Harry Bohrmann (to BV Herne-Süd 1913)
—	MF	FRG	Hans-Günter Etterich (to SC Westfalia Herne)
—	MF	FRG	Franz-Josef Laufer (to Schwarz-Weiss Essen)
—	FW	FRG	Reinhard Majgl (to K.A.S. Eupen)
—	MF	GRE	Fotios Papadopoulos (to Kalamata F.C.)
—	FW	FRG	Hans Walitza (to 1. FC Nürnberg)
