= 1975–76 VfL Bochum season =

VfL Bochum
1975–76 season
- President: Ottokar Wüst
- Head Coach: Heinz Höher
- Stadium: Stadion an der Castroper Straße (until 19 March 1976); Schloss Strünkede, Herne (20 March 1976 – 12 June 1976); Westfalenstadion, Dortmund (2 April 1976)
- Bundesliga: 14th
- DFB-Pokal: Third round
- Top goalscorer: League: Josef Kaczor (12); All: Josef Kaczor (16)
- Highest home attendance: 45,000 (vs. FC Schalke 04, 2 April 1976)
- Lowest home attendance: 10,000 (vs. SV Werder Bremen, 9 August 1975; MSV Duisburg, 10 April 1976)
- Average home league attendance: 20,126
Home colours	Away colours	Third colours

The 1975–76 VfL Bochum season was the 38th season in club history.

== Matches ==
=== Legend ===
Win Draw Loss

=== Bundesliga ===
9 August 1975 1	VfL Bochum	0–3	SV Werder Bremen	Bochum
15:30			Röber 36'; Åslund 39'; Weist 86'	Stadium: Stadion an der Castroper Straße; Attendance: 10,000; Referee: Heinz Quindeau (Ludwigshafen)

16 August 1975 2	Bayer 05 Uerdingen	0–0	VfL Bochum	Uerdingen
15:30				Stadium: Grotenburg-Stadion; Attendance: 10,900; Referee: Dieter Dreher (Darmstadt)

23 August 1975 3	VfL Bochum	0–1	Fortuna Düsseldorf	Bochum
15:30			Zimmermann 41'	Stadium: Stadion an der Castroper Straße; Attendance: 18,000; Referee: Jürgen Walther (Würzburg)

27 August 1975 4	FC Schalke 04	1–1	VfL Bochum	Gelsenkirchen
20:00	Fischer 85'		Lameck 55' (pen.)	Stadium: Parkstadion; Attendance: 50,000; Referee: Dieter Berner (Enzberg)

30 August 1975 5	VfL Bochum	5–1	Kickers Offenbach	Bochum
15:30	Ellbracht 53'; Köper 56'; Eggeling 63'; Pochstein 64'; Balte 85' (pen.)		Hickersberger 40' (pen.)	Stadium: Stadion an der Castroper Straße; Attendance: 21,000; Referee: Klaus Ohmsen (Hamburg)

6 September 1975 6	Borussia Mönchengladbach	1–1	VfL Bochum	Mönchengladbach
15:30	Heynckes 10'		Eggeling 69'	Stadium: Bökelbergstadion; Attendance: 23,000; Referee: Jan Redelfs (Hannover)

13 September 1975 7	VfL Bochum	2–0	Hannover 96	Bochum
15:30	Köper 39'; Balte 57'			Stadium: Stadion an der Castroper Straße; Attendance: 23,000; Referee: Winfried Walz (Waiblingen)

19 September 1975 8	1. FC Kaiserslautern	2–1	VfL Bochum	Kaiserslautern
20:00	Toppmöller 47'; Diehl 75' (pen.)		Kaczor 77'	Stadium: Betzenbergstadion; Attendance: 13,000; Referee: Herbert Lutz (Bremen)

27 September 1975 9	VfL Bochum	0–3	Hamburger SV	Bochum
15:30			Ettmayer 38'; Sperlich 86'; Nogly 88'	Stadium: Stadion an der Castroper Straße; Attendance: 18,000; Referee: Max Klauser (Munich)

4 October 1975 10	MSV Duisburg	1–1	VfL Bochum	Duisburg
15:30	Dietz 86'		Kaczor 55'	Stadium: Wedaustadion; Attendance: 11,000; Referee: Karl-Heinz Picker (Hamburg)

24 October 1975 11	VfL Bochum	2–1	Rot-Weiss Essen	Bochum
20:00	Ellbracht 47'; Köper 90'		Hrubesch 52'	Stadium: Stadion an der Castroper Straße; Attendance: 25,000; Referee: Eberhard Schmoock (Reichenau)

31 October 1975 12	1. FC Köln	1–0	VfL Bochum	Cologne
20:00	Löhr 86'			Stadium: Radrennbahn Müngersdorf; Attendance: 15,000; Referee: Manfred Scheffner (Nußloch)

8 November 1975 13	Eintracht Frankfurt	6–0	VfL Bochum	Frankfurt am Main
15:30	Wenzel 25'; Lorenz 48' (pen.); Beverungen 54', 86'; Körbel 60'; Reichel 84'			Stadium: Waldstadion; Attendance: 10,000; Referee: Jan Redelfs (Hannover)

15 November 1975 14	VfL Bochum	3–1	FC Bayern Munich	Bochum
15:30	Trimhold 27'; Tenhagen 30'; Fromm 75'		Kapellmann 80'	Stadium: Stadion an der Castroper Straße; Attendance: 28,000; Referee: Walter Horstmann (Hildesheim)

22 November 1975 15	Hertha BSC	4–1	VfL Bochum	West Berlin
15:30	Kostedde 1', 42'; Horr 17'; Beer 44'		Kaczor 16'	Stadium: Olympiastadion; Attendance: 10,000; Referee: Theo Antz (Wahlen)

28 November 1975 16	VfL Bochum	2–0	Eintracht Braunschweig	Bochum
20:00	Kaczor 57', 72'			Stadium: Stadion an der Castroper Straße; Attendance: 13,000; Referee: Dieter Dreher (Darmstadt)

6 December 1975 17	Karlsruher SC	2–2	VfL Bochum	Karlsruhe
15:30	Schäfer 46'; Berger 50'		Eggeling 20', 84'	Stadium: Wildparkstadion; Attendance: 18,000; Referee: Günter Linn (Altendiez)

17 January 1976 18	SV Werder Bremen	4–1	VfL Bochum	Bremen
15:30	Røntved 36', 78'; Müllner 49'; Röber 65' (pen.)		Lameck 31' (pen.)	Stadium: Weserstadion; Attendance: 15,000; Referee: Winfried Walz (Waiblingen)

24 January 1976 19	VfL Bochum	3–0	Bayer 05 Uerdingen	Bochum
15:30	Ellbracht 13', 23'; Lameck 61'			Stadium: Stadion an der Castroper Straße; Attendance: 11,150; Referee: Gert Meuser (Ingelheim)

7 February 1976 20	Fortuna Düsseldorf	3–1	VfL Bochum	Rheinstadion
15:30	Mattsson 11', 18'; Zimmermann 46'		Miß 60'	Stadium: Düsseldorf; Attendance: 13,000; Referee: Jürgen Meßmer (Mannheim)

2 April 1976 21	VfL Bochum	1–4	FC Schalke 04	Dortmund
20:00	Pochstein 88'		Kremers 35'; Bongartz 51'; Lütkebohmert 71'; Fischer 74'	Stadium: Westfalenstadion; Attendance: 45,000; Referee: Jürgen Walther (Würzburg)

21 February 1976 22	Kickers Offenbach	1–0	VfL Bochum	Offenbach
15:30	Janzon 10'			Stadium: Stadion am Bieberer Berg; Attendance: 13,000; Referee: Udo Zuchantke (West Berlin)

6 March 1976 23	VfL Bochum	2–0	Borussia Mönchengladbach	Bochum
15:30	Köper 48'; Kaczor 87'			Stadium: Stadion an der Castroper Straße; Attendance: 25,000; Referee: Rudolf Frickel (Munich)

13 March 1976 24	Hannover 96	4–1	VfL Bochum	Hannover
15:30	Anders 42'; Kaemmer 44' (pen.), 70'; Lüttges 83'		Anders 68' (o.g.)	Stadium: Niedersachsenstadion; Attendance: 12,400; Referee: Eberhard Schmoock (Reichenau)

20 March 1976 25	VfL Bochum	2–0	1. FC Kaiserslautern	Herne
15:30	Eggert 11'; Lameck 64'			Stadium: Stadion am Schloss Strünkede; Attendance: 16,000; Referee: Volker Roth (Salzgitter)

27 March 1976 26	Hamburger SV	5–3	VfL Bochum	Hamburg
15:30	Memering 68'; Sperlich 73'; Zaczyk 75'; Bjørnmose 77'; Nogly 90'		Eggert 33'; Balte 78'; Lameck 81'	Stadium: Volksparkstadion; Attendance: 18,000; Referee: Wilfried Haselberger (Reutlingen)

10 April 1976 27	VfL Bochum	1–2	MSV Duisburg	Herne
15:30	Gerland 44'		Bruckmann 9'; Büssers 89'	Stadium: Stadion am Schloss Strünkede; Attendance: 10,000; Referee: Heinz Aldinger (Waiblingen)

17 April 1976 28	Rot-Weiss Essen	1–0	VfL Bochum	Essen
15:30	Burgsmüller 84'			Stadium: Georg-Melches-Stadion; Attendance: 10,200; Referee: Max Klauser (Munich)

1 May 1976 29	VfL Bochum	1–0	1. FC Köln	Herne
15:30	Kaczor 27'			Stadium: Stadion am Schloss Strünkede; Attendance: 18,000; Referee: Dieter Dreher (Darmstadt)

8 May 1976 30	VfL Bochum	5–3	Eintracht Frankfurt	Herne
15:30	Kaczor 9', 89'; Eggeling 48'; Lameck 67' (pen.); Eggert 80'		Kraus 29'; Hölzenbein 40', 78'	Stadium: Stadion am Schloss Strünkede; Attendance: 18,000; Referee: Ferdinand Biwersi (Bliesransbach)

15 May 1976 31	FC Bayern Munich	4–0	VfL Bochum	Munich
15:30	Beckenbauer 33'; Künkel 52'; Müller 56', 82' (pen.)			Stadium: Olympiastadion; Attendance: 26,000; Referee: Gert Meuser (Ingelheim)

29 May 1976 32	VfL Bochum	2–0	Hertha BSC	Herne
15:30	Kaczor 24'; Tenhagen 74'			Stadium: Stadion am Schloss Strünkede; Attendance: 18,000; Referee: Eberhard Schmoock (Reichenau)

4 June 1976 33	Eintracht Braunschweig	1–1	VfL Bochum	Braunschweig
15:30	Kaczor 24'		Gersdorff 73'	Stadium: Eintracht-Stadion; Attendance: 18,000; Referee: Jürgen Meßmer (Mannheim)

12 June 1976 34	VfL Bochum	4–2	Karlsruher SC	Herne
15:30	Kaczor 4'; Eggeling 26'; Eggert 51'; Pochstein 81'		Niedermayer 61'; Struth 84' (pen.)	Stadium: Stadion am Schloss Strünkede; Attendance: 25,000; Referee: Volker Roth (Salzgitter)

=== DFB-Pokal ===
1 August 1975 R1	SpVgg Erkenschwick	2–3	VfL Bochum	Oer-Erkenschwick
	Tenbrink 31'; Walter 84'		Balte 12', 59'; Kaczor 13'	Stadium: Stimbergstadion; Attendance: 6,000; Referee: Walter Eschweiler (Bonn)

18 October 1975 R2	Bayer 04 Leverkusen	0–2	VfL Bochum	Leverkusen
			Kaczor 55', 61'	Stadium: Ulrich-Haberland-Stadion; Attendance: 8,000; Referee: Günter Linn (Altendiez)

13 December 1975 R3	Fortuna Düsseldorf	4–4 (a.e.t.)	VfL Bochum	Düsseldorf
	Geye 28'; Allofs 55'; Seel 62'; Kriegler 117'		Köper 6', 47'; Kaczor 9'; Gerland 92'	Stadium: Rheinstadion; Attendance: 11,000; Referee: Paul Kindervater (Cologne)

17 December 1975 R3 Replay	VfL Bochum	1–3 (a.e.t.)	Fortuna Düsseldorf	Bochum
	Eggeling 30'		Zimmermann 73'; Herzog 102'; Seel 105'	Stadium: Stadion an der Castroper Straße; Attendance: 20,000; Referee: Volker Roth (Salzgitter)

== Squad ==
=== Squad and statistics ===
==== Squad, appearances and goals scored ====
No.	Pos	Nat	Player	Total		Bundesliga		DFB-Pokal	
No.	Pos	Nat	Player	Apps	Goals	Apps	Goals	Apps	Goals
	MF	(West Germany) FRG	Werner Balte	31	5	27	3	4	2
	DF	(West Germany) FRG	Klaus-Dieter Dewinski	3	0	2	0	1	0
	FW	(West Germany) FRG	Heinz-Werner Eggeling	38	7	34	6	4	1
	DF	(West Germany) FRG	Michael Eggert	36	4	32	4	4	0
	FW	(West Germany) FRG	Harry Ellbracht	15	4	15	4	0	0
	MF	(West Germany) FRG	Wolfgang Euteneuer	2	0	2	0	0	0
	DF	(West Germany) FRG	Klaus Franke	14	0	14	0	0	0
	DF	(West Germany) FRG	Hartmut Fromm	34	1	30	1	4	0
	DF	(West Germany) FRG	Hermann Gerland	29	2	25	1	4	1
	FW	(West Germany) FRG	Josef Kaczor	31	16	27	12	4	4
	MF	(West Germany) FRG	Hans-Jürgen Köper	38	6	34	4	4	2
	FW	(West Germany) FRG	Peter Kursinski	4	0	4	0	0	0
	DF	(West Germany) FRG	Michael Lameck	38	6	34	6	4	0
	GK	(West Germany) FRG	Reinhard Mager	0	0	0	0	0	0
	DF	(West Germany) FRG	Erich Miß	20	1	18	1	2	0
	FW	(West Germany) FRG	Hans-Joachim Pochstein	35	3	31	3	4	0
	GK	(West Germany) FRG	Werner Scholz	38	0	34	0	4	0
	MF	(West Germany) FRG	Franz-Josef Tenhagen	38	2	34	2	4	0
	MF	(West Germany) FRG	Holger Trimhold	13	1	12	1	1	0
	DF	(West Germany) FRG	Dieter Versen	15	0	13	0	2	0

=== Transfers ===
==== Summer ====
In:

No.	Pos.	Nation	Player
—	FW	FRG	Harry Ellbracht (form SSV Hagen)
—	MF	FRG	Wolfgang Euteneuer (form VfL Bochum II)
—	GK	FRG	Reinhard Mager (form BSV Schwenningen)
—	DF	FRG	Erich Miß (form Wuppertaler SV)
—	MF	FRG	Holger Trimhold (form Schwarz-Weiss Essen)

Out:

No.	Pos.	Nation	Player
—	GK	FRG	Hans-Jürgen Bradler (to SC Westfalia Herne)
—	DF	FRG	Harry Fechner (on loan to 1. FC Saarbrücken)
—	DF	FRG	Harry Fechner (on loan to DJK Gütersloh, previously on loan at 1. FC Saarbrücken)
—	DF	FRG	Erwin Galeski (to Vorwärts Herne)
—	MF	FRG	Paul Holz (to Hannover 96)
—	MF	FRG	Gisbert Horsthemke (to SpVgg Erkenschwick)
