= 1973–74 VfL Bochum season =

VfL Bochum
1973–74 season
- President: Ottokar Wüst
- Head Coach: Heinz Höher
- Stadium: Stadion an der Castroper Straße
- Bundesliga: 14th
- DFB-Pokal: First Round
- Top goalscorer: League: Hans Walitza (13); All: Hans Walitza (14)
- Highest home attendance: 32,000 (vs FC Bayern Munich, 3 November 1973)
- Lowest home attendance: 6,000 (vs Kickers Offenbach, 24 November 1973)
- Average home league attendance: 17,853
Home colours	Away colours

The 1973–74 VfL Bochum season was the 36th season in club history.

== Matches ==
=== Legend ===
Win Draw Loss

=== Bundesliga ===
11 August 1973 1	VfL Bochum	2–1	Wuppertaler SV Borussia	Bochum
15:30	Walitza 3'; Balte 24' (pen.)		Pröpper 74' (pen.)	Stadium: Stadion an der Castroper Straße; Attendance: 25,000; Referee: Klaus Ohmsen (Hamburg)

17 August 1973 2	FC Schalke 04	3–1	VfL Bochum	Gelsenkirchen
20:00	Kremers 10'; Holz 33'; Beverungen 69'		Versen 36'	Stadium: Parkstadion; Attendance: 60,000; Referee: Kurt Tschenscher (Mannheim)

22 August 1973 3	VfL Bochum	0–0	SV Werder Bremen	Bochum
20:00				Stadium: Stadion an der Castroper Straße; Attendance: 19,000; Referee: Dieter Dreher (Darmstadt)

25 August 1973 4	Hannover 96	1–2	VfL Bochum	Hannover
15:30	Siemensmeyer 64' (pen.)		Walitza 3'; Etterich 48'	Stadium: Niedersachsenstadion; Attendance: 16,000; Referee: Wolfgang Dittmer (Mutterstadt)

31 August 1973 5	VfL Bochum	1–1	Eintracht Frankfurt	Bochum
20:00	Walitza 51'		Körbel 76'	Stadium: Stadion an der Castroper Straße; Attendance: 27,000; Referee: Gert Meuser (Ingelheim)

8 September 1973 6	1. FC Köln	2–2	VfL Bochum	Cologne
15:30	Flohe 34'; Weber 67'		Balte 69' (pen.); Eggert 74'	Stadium: Radrennbahn Müngersdorf; Attendance: 11,000; Referee: Wilfried Haselberger (Reutlingen)

15 September 1973 7	VfL Bochum	3–0	MSV Duisburg	Bochum
15:30	Balte 23', 75'; Walitza 80'			Stadium: Stadion an der Castroper Straße; Attendance: 15,000; Referee: Heinz Aldinger (Waiblingen)

21 September 1973 8	1. FC Kaiserslautern	0–2	VfL Bochum	Kaiserslautern
20:00			Tenhagen 3'; Walitza 68'	Stadium: Betzenbergstadion; Attendance: 27,000; Referee: Dieter Wohlfarth (Bergen-Enkheim)

29 September 1973 9	VfL Bochum	0–0	VfB Stuttgart	Bochum
15:30				Stadium: Stadion an der Castroper Straße; Attendance: 16,000; Referee: Ferdinand Biwersi (Bliesransbach)

6 October 1973 10	Fortuna Düsseldorf	1–1	VfL Bochum	Düsseldorf
15:30	Geye 28'		Etterich 23'	Stadium: Rheinstadion; Attendance: 18,500; Referee: Alfons Betz (Regensburg)

17 October 1973 11	Hamburger SV	5–0	VfL Bochum	Hamburg
15:30	Bjørnmose 6'; Zaczyk 38'; Heese 44'; Winkler 72'; Nogly 88'			Stadium: Volksparkstadion; Attendance: 10,000; Referee: Kurt Tschenscher (Mannheim)

24 November 1973 12	VfL Bochum	4–1	Kickers Offenbach	Bochum
15:30	Versen 20'; Fromm 22'; Eggeling 37'; Balte 38'		Kostedde 89'	Stadium: Stadion an der Castroper Straße; Attendance: 6,000; Referee: Walter Horstmann (Hildesheim)

27 October 1973 13	Borussia Mönchengladbach	2–0	VfL Bochum	Mönchengladbach
15:30	Jensen 21'; Heynckes 24'			Stadium: Bökelbergstadion; Attendance: 20,000; Referee: Herbert Kollmann (Obertal)

3 November 1973 14	VfL Bochum	0–1	FC Bayern Munich	Bochum
15:30			Hoeneß 20'	Stadium: Stadion an der Castroper Straße; Attendance: 32,000; Referee: Jan Redelfs (Hannover)

10 November 1973 15	Fortuna Köln	2–2	VfL Bochum	Cologne
15:30	Zimmermann 56'; Glock 71'		Tenhagen 18'; Walitza 39'	Stadium: Radrennbahn Müngersdorf; Attendance: 8,000; Referee: Eberhard Schmoock (Reichenau)

17 November 1973 16	VfL Bochum	1–2	Rot-Weiss Essen	Bochum
15:30	Tenhagen 11'		Fürhoff 7'; Lippens 36'	Stadium: Stadion an der Castroper Straße; Attendance: 19,000; Referee: Dieter Dreher (Darmstadt)

11 December 1973 17	Hertha BSC	4–2	VfL Bochum	West Berlin
20:00	Horr 12', 30'; Müller 20'; Gutzeit 48'		Balte 40'; Walitza 88'	Stadium: Olympiastadion; Attendance: 5,000; Referee: Karl Riegg (Augsburg)

5 January 1974 18	Wuppertaler SV Borussia	2–0	VfL Bochum	Wuppertal
15:30	Kohle 39' (pen.); Pröpper 76'			Stadium: Stadion am Zoo; Attendance: 12,000; Referee: Herbert Lutz (Bremen)

12 January 1974 19	VfL Bochum	2–5	FC Schalke 04	Bochum
15:30	Majgl 81', 88'		Abramczik 4'; Fischer 17', 50' (pen.); Holz 38'; Kremers 78'	Stadium: Stadion an der Castroper Straße; Attendance: 26,000; Referee: Alfons Betz (Regensburg)

19 January 1974 20	SV Werder Bremen	1–0	VfL Bochum	Bremen
15:30	Höttges 36' (pen.)			Stadium: Weserstadion; Attendance: 9,800; Referee: Rudolf Frickel (Munich)

26 January 1974 21	VfL Bochum	3–1	Hannover 96	Bochum
15:30	Balte 29'; Fechner 58'; Majgl 81'		Galeski 40' (o.g.)	Stadium: Stadion an der Castroper Straße; Attendance: 15,000; Referee: Max Klauser (Munich)

2 February 1974 22	Eintracht Frankfurt	3–1	VfL Bochum	Frankfurt am Main
15:30	Körbel 15'; Grabowski 58' (pen.); Kalb 64'		Balte 60' (pen.)	Stadium: Waldstadion; Attendance: 15,000; Referee: Heinz Quindeau (Ludwigshafen)

9 February 1974 23	VfL Bochum	0–2	1. FC Köln	Bochum
15:30			Löhr 27'; Müller 65'	Stadium: Stadion an der Castroper Straße; Attendance: 8,500; Referee: Eberhard Schmoock (Reichenau)

2 March 1974 24	MSV Duisburg	0–0	VfL Bochum	Duisburg
15:30				Stadium: Wedaustadion; Attendance: 11,400; Referee: Heinz Aldinger (Waiblingen)

9 March 1974 25	VfL Bochum	2–2	1. FC Kaiserslautern	Bochum
15:30	Eggert 64'; Fromm 88'		Wilhelmi 62'; Sandberg 76'	Stadium: Stadion an der Castroper Straße; Attendance: 11,000; Referee: Ottmar Nützel (Neustadt an der Aisch)

16 March 1974 26	VfB Stuttgart	2–0	VfL Bochum	Stuttgart
15:30	Stickel 75'; Handschuh 81'			Stadium: Neckarstadion; Attendance: 8,000; Referee: Herbert Kollmann (Obertal)

23 March 1974 27	VfL Bochum	3–3	Fortuna Düsseldorf	Bochum
15:30	Lameck 1'; Balte 55'; Walitza 71'		Köhnen 16'; Herzog 40'; Budde 78'	Stadium: Stadion an der Castroper Straße; Attendance: 18,000; Referee: Wolfgang Dittmer (Mutterstadt)

30 March 1974 28	VfL Bochum	2–0	Hamburger SV	Bochum
15:30	Lameck 43'; Majgl 83'			Stadium: Stadion an der Castroper Straße; Attendance: 19,000; Referee: Peter Gabor (West Berlin)

6 April 1974 29	Kickers Offenbach	2–2	VfL Bochum	Offenbach am Main
15:30	Kostedde 59'; Schäfer 82'		Etterich 19'; Walitza 66'	Stadium: Stadion am Bieberer Berg; Attendance: 6,000; Referee: Volker Roth (Salzgitter)

20 April 1974 30	VfL Bochum	1–1	Borussia Mönchengladbach	Bochum
15:30	Walitza 56'		Rupp 28'	Stadium: Stadion an der Castroper Straße; Attendance: 26,000; Referee: Kurt Tschenscher (Mannheim)

27 April 1974 31	FC Bayern Munich	4–0	VfL Bochum	Munich
15:30	Roth 4'; Müller 17'; Hoeneß 37'; Zobel 52'			Stadium: Olympiastadion; Attendance: 18,000; Referee: Jürgen Schumann (Neuwied)

4 May 1974 32	VfL Bochum	2–0	Fortuna Köln	Bochum
15:30	Balte 20'; Walitza 80'			Stadium: Stadion an der Castroper Straße; Attendance: 13,000; Referee: Herbert Lutz (Bremen)

11 May 1974 33	Rot-Weiss Essen	2–2	VfL Bochum	Essen
15:30	Lippens 36'; Bast 40' (pen.)		Tenhagen 35'; Balte 76'	Stadium: Georg-Melches-Stadion; Attendance: 10,000; Referee: Karl Riegg (Augsburg)

18 May 1974 34	VfL Bochum	2–1	Hertha BSC	Bochum
15:30	Walitza 39', 52'		Horr 87'	Stadium: Stadion an der Castroper Straße; Attendance: 8,000; Referee: Herbert Lutz (Bremen)

=== DFB-Pokal ===
1 December 1973 1	VfL Bochum	2–2 (a.e.t.)	SV Werder Bremen	Bochum
14:30	Versen 12'; Laufer 16'		Höttges 50' (pen.), 89'	Stadium: Stadion an der Castroper Straße; Attendance: 5,000; Referee: Volker Huster (Lahnstein)

5 December 1973 1 Replay	SV Werder Bremen	2–1	VfL Bochum	Bremen
19:30	Zembski 2'; Erkenbrecher 32'		Walitza 37'	Stadium: Weserstadion; Attendance: 11,000; Referee: Heinz Nickel (Neustadt an der Weinstraße)

== Squad ==
=== Squad and statistics ===
==== Squad, appearances and goals scored ====
No.	Pos	Nat	Player	Total		Bundesliga		DFB-Pokal	
No.	Pos	Nat	Player	Apps	Goals	Apps	Goals	Apps	Goals
	MF	(West Germany) FRG	Werner Balte	36	11	34	11	2	0
	GK	(West Germany) FRG	Harry Bohrmann	0	0	0	0	0	0
	FW	(West Germany) FRG	Peter Bomm	3	0	2	0	1	0
	GK	(West Germany) FRG	Hans-Jürgen Bradler	1	0	1	0	0	0
	DF	(West Germany) FRG	Klaus-Dieter Dewinski	7	0	5	0	2	0
	FW	(West Germany) FRG	Heinz-Werner Eggeling	33	1	31	1	2	0
	MF	(West Germany) FRG	Michael Eggert	26	2	25	2	1	0
	MF	(West Germany) FRG	Hans-Günter Etterich	22	3	21	3	1	0
	DF	(West Germany) FRG	Harry Fechner	31	1	29	1	2	0
	DF	(West Germany) FRG	Hartmut Fromm	18	2	16	2	2	0
	DF	(West Germany) FRG	Erwin Galeski	30	0	30	0	0	0
	FW	(West Germany) FRG	Hermann Gerland	13	0	13	0	0	0
	MF	(West Germany) FRG	Hans-Jürgen Köper	9	0	9	0	0	0
	MF	(West Germany) FRG	Michael Lameck	36	2	34	2	2	0
	MF	(West Germany) FRG	Franz-Josef Laufer	22	1	20	0	2	1
	FW	(West Germany) FRG	Reinhard Majgl	16	4	16	4	0	0
	MF	(Greece) GRE	Fotios Papadopoulos	2	0	2	0	0	0
	MF	(West Germany) FRG	Rainer Pommerin	1	0	0	0	1	0
	GK	(West Germany) FRG	Werner Scholz	35	0	33	0	2	0
	MF	(West Germany) FRG	Franz-Josef Tenhagen	36	4	34	4	2	0
	DF	(West Germany) FRG	Dieter Versen	36	3	34	2	2	1
	FW	(West Germany) FRG	Hans Walitza	33	14	31	13	2	1

=== Transfers ===
==== Summer ====
In:

No.	Pos.	Nation	Player
—	FW	FRG	Heinz-Werner Eggeling (form VfL Bochum youth)
—	DF	FRG	Hartmut Fromm (form RW Unna)
—	MF	FRG	Franz-Josef Tenhagen (form Rot-Weiß Oberhausen)

Out:

No.	Pos.	Nation	Player
—	DF	FRG	Heinz-Jürgen Blome (to VfL Witten)
—	FW	FRG	Hans-Werner Hartl (to Borussia Dortmund)
—	MF	FRG	Klaus-Peter Kerkemeier (to SC Westfalia Herne)
—	MF	FRG	Werner Krämer (retired)
—	DF	FRG	Manfred Rüsing (to 1. FC Nürnberg)
—	DF	FRG	Reinhold Wosab (to Rot-Weiß Lüdenscheid)

==== Winter ====
In:

No.	Pos.	Nation	Player
—	MF	GRE	Fotios Papadopoulos (form VfL Bochum II)

Out:

No.	Pos.	Nation	Player
