= 1972–73 VfL Bochum season =

VfL Bochum
1972–73 season
- President: Ottokar Wüst
- Head Coach: Heinz Höher
- Stadium: Stadion an der Castroper Straße
- Bundesliga: 12th
- DFB-Pokal: Second round
- DFB-Ligapokal: Group Stage
- Top goalscorer: League: Hans Walitza (18); All: Hans Walitza (22)
- Highest home attendance: 32,000 (vs Borussia Mönchengladbach, 7 October 1972)
- Lowest home attendance: 3,000 (vs Rot-Weiß Oberhausen, 2 June 1973)
- Average home league attendance: 16,412
Home colours	Away colours

The 1972–73 VfL Bochum season was the 35th season in club history.

== Matches ==
=== Legend ===
Win Draw Loss

=== Bundesliga ===
16 September 1972 1	Eintracht Braunschweig	0–2	VfL Bochum	Braunschweig
15:30			Hartl 34'; Walitza 38'	Stadium: Eintracht-Stadion; Attendance: 6,500; Referee: Fritz Seiler (Schmiden)

20 September 1972 2	VfL Bochum	2–1	Hertha BSC	Bochum
16:45	Wosab 70'; Walitza 89'		Weiner 57'	Stadium: Stadion an der Castroper Straße; Attendance: 15,000; Referee: Franz Wengenmeyer (Munich)

23 September 1972 3	Wuppertaler SV Borussia	3–0	VfL Bochum	Wuppertal
15:30	Reichert 22'; Jung 73'; Kohle 86'			Stadium: Stadion am Zoo; Attendance: 25,000; Referee: Dieter Heckeroth (Frankfurt am Main)

30 September 1972 4	VfL Bochum	2–0	FC Schalke 04	Bochum
15:30	Köper 43'; Majgl 59'			Stadium: Stadion an der Castroper Straße; Attendance: 27,000; Referee: Rudolf Frickel (Munich)

3 October 1972 5	Eintracht Frankfurt	4–1	VfL Bochum	Frankfurt am Main
20:00	Weidle 23'; Grabowski 31', 38'; Nickel 72'		Köper 14'	Stadium: Waldstadion; Attendance: 10,000; Referee: Heinz Quindeau (Ludwigshafen)

7 October 1972 6	VfL Bochum	3–0	Borussia Mönchengladbach	Bochum
19:30	Walitza 7'; Lameck 79'; Wosab 82'			Stadium: Stadion an der Castroper Straße; Attendance: 32,000; Referee: Kurt Tschenscher (Mannheim)

14 October 1972 7	VfB Stuttgart	4–0	VfL Bochum	Stuttgart
15:30	Köppel 32', 33'; Schwemmle 57'; Handschuh 88' (pen.)			Stadium: Neckarstadion; Attendance: 12,000; Referee: Gert Meuser (Ingelheim)

21 October 1972 8	VfL Bochum	2–1	MSV Duisburg	Bochum
15:30	Walitza 30'; Dietz 85' (o.g.)		Seliger 57'	Stadium: Stadion an der Castroper Straße; Attendance: 12,000; Referee: Gerd Siepe (Cologne)

28 October 1972 9	Hamburger SV	2–1	VfL Bochum	Hamburg
15:30	Zaczyk 42'; Kaltz 60'		Walitza 87'	Stadium: Volksparkstadion; Attendance: 16,000; Referee: Karl Riegg (Augsburg)

31 October 1972 10	VfL Bochum	2–0	Hannover 96	Bochum
20:00	Lameck 66'; Balte 68' (pen.)			Stadium: Stadion an der Castroper Straße; Attendance: 18,000; Referee: Philipp Geng (Freiburg)

4 November 1972 11	1. FC Kaiserslautern	2–2	VfL Bochum	Kaiserslautern
15:30	Pirrung 5'; Vogt 59'		Walitza 70'; Wosab 90'	Stadium: Betzenbergstadion; Attendance: 5,000; Referee: Jan Redelfs (Hannover)

11 November 1972 12	VfL Bochum	2–2	Fortuna Düsseldorf	Bochum
15:30	Walitza 21'; Wosab 68'		Geye 32', 56'	Stadium: Stadion an der Castroper Straße; Attendance: 28,000; Referee: Jürgen Schumann (Neuwied)

17 November 1972 13	VfL Bochum	2–4	1. FC Köln	Bochum
20:00	Lameck 65'; Konopka 69' (o.g.)		Löhr 3', 85'; Simmet 60'; Flohe 84'	Stadium: Stadion an der Castroper Straße; Attendance: 15,000; Referee: Ferdinand Biwersi (Bliesransbach)

22 November 1972 14	Kickers Offenbach	4–0	VfL Bochum	Offenbach am Main
15:30	Schäfer 24'; Hickersberger 53'; Semlitsch 64' (pen.); Kostedde 81'			Stadium: Stadion am Bieberer Berg; Attendance: 15,000; Referee: Heinz Quindeau (Ludwigshafen)

25 November 1972 15	VfL Bochum	0–2	FC Bayern Munich	Bochum
15:30			Hoeneß 42'; Müller 90'	Stadium: Stadion an der Castroper Straße; Attendance: 27,000; Referee: Günter Linn (Altendiez)

1 December 1972 16	Rot-Weiß Oberhausen	1–1	VfL Bochum	Oberhausen
20:00	Kobluhn 80' (pen.)		Walitza 3'	Stadium: Niederrheinstadion; Attendance: 8,000; Referee: Dieter Berner (Enzberg)

15 December 1972 17	VfL Bochum	2–0	SV Werder Bremen	Bochum
20:00	Krämer 13'; Lameck 89'			Stadium: Stadion an der Castroper Straße; Attendance: 10,000; Referee: Kurt Tschenscher (Mannheim)

20 January 1973 18	VfL Bochum	2–2	Eintracht Braunschweig	Bochum
15:30	Walitza 68'; Kaack 73' (o.g.)		Erler 12'; Bründl 77'	Stadium: Stadion an der Castroper Straße; Attendance: 10,000; Referee: Alfons Betz (Regensburg)

21 April 1973 19	Hertha BSC	2–0	VfL Bochum	West Berlin
15:30	Müller 41' (pen.); Horr 69'			Stadium: Olympiastadion; Attendance: 22,300; Referee: Dietrich Basedow (Hamburg)

3 February 1973 20	VfL Bochum	2–2	Wuppertaler SV Borussia	Bochum
15:30	Majgl 3'; Miß 39' (o.g.)		Homann 13'; Pröpper 78'	Stadium: Stadion an der Castroper Straße; Attendance: 25,000; Referee: Rudolf Frickel (Munich)

10 February 1973 21	FC Schalke 04	2–0	VfL Bochum	Gelsenkirchen
15:30	Budde 21'; Lütkebohmert 71'			Stadium: Glückauf-Kampfbahn; Attendance: 18,000; Referee: Karl Riegg (Augsburg)

17 February 1973 22	VfL Bochum	2–1	Eintracht Frankfurt	Bochum
15:30	Etterich 56'; Majgl 73'		Nickel 51'	Stadium: Stadion an der Castroper Straße; Attendance: 10,000; Referee: Udo Zuchantke (West Berlin)

23 February 1973 23	Borussia Mönchengladbach	6–0	VfL Bochum	Mönchengladbach
20:00	Rupp 12'; Jensen 32'; Danner 54'; Heynckes 75'; Wittkamp 79'; Kulik 86'			Stadium: Bökelbergstadion; Attendance: 10,000; Referee: Philipp Geng (Freiburg)

10 March 1973 24	VfL Bochum	3–1	VfB Stuttgart	Bochum
15:30	Majgl 3', 89'; Köper 83'		Wosab 66' (o.g.)	Stadium: Stadion an der Castroper Straße; Attendance: 10,000; Referee: Wolfgang Dittmer (Mutterstadt)

17 March 1973 25	MSV Duisburg	0–1	VfL Bochum	Duisburg
15:30			Walitza 82'	Stadium: Wedaustadion; Attendance: 8,000; Referee: Elmar Schäfer (Neustadt am Rübenberge)

24 March 1973 26	VfL Bochum	3–3	Hamburger SV	Bochum
15:30	Walitza 12', 50', 75'		Hönig 56'; Winkler 78'; Bjørnmose 87'	Stadium: Stadion an der Castroper Straße; Attendance: 15,000; Referee: Rudolf Schröck (Riegelsberg)

31 March 1973 27	Hannover 96	1–1	VfL Bochum	Hannover
15:30	Siemensmeyer 59' (pen.)		Lameck 65'	Stadium: Niedersachsenstadion; Attendance: 16,500; Referee: Fritz Seiler (Schmiden)

6 April 1973 28	VfL Bochum	3–0	1. FC Kaiserslautern	Bochum
20:00	Balte 15'; Majgl 40'; Walitza 85'			Stadium: Stadion an der Castroper Straße; Attendance: 10,000; Referee: Walter Niemann (Hamburg)

28 April 1973 29	Fortuna Düsseldorf	1–1	VfL Bochum	Düsseldorf
15:30	Geye 18'		Hartl 24'	Stadium: Rheinstadion; Attendance: 15,000; Referee: Jan Redelfs (Hannover)

4 May 1973 30	1. FC Köln	2–1	VfL Bochum	Cologne
20:00	Cullmann 77'; Flohe 87'		Walitza 15'	Stadium: Radrennbahn Müngersdorf; Attendance: 10,000; Referee: Hans Hillebrand (Essen)

19 May 1973 31	VfL Bochum	2–3	Kickers Offenbach	Bochum
15:30	Walitza 66'; Gerland 68'		Kostedde 19', 55', 84'	Stadium: Stadion an der Castroper Straße; Attendance: 12,000; Referee: Walter Engel (Reimsbach)

26 May 1973 32	FC Bayern Munich	5–1	VfL Bochum	Munich
15:30	Müller 31', 54'; Dürnberger 58'; Breitner 73'; Hoffmann 90'		Hartl 8'	Stadium: Olympiastadion; Attendance: 13,000; Referee: Norbert Fuchs (Herdorf)

2 June 1973 33	VfL Bochum	2–2	Rot-Weiß Oberhausen	Bochum
15:30	Walitza 23', 75'		Dick 38'; Jakobs 64'	Stadium: Stadion an der Castroper Straße; Attendance: 3,000; Referee: Wilfried Haselberger (Reutlingen)

9 June 1973 34	SV Werder Bremen	5–2	VfL Bochum	Bremen
15:30	Weist 10', 30', 88'; Hasebrink 16'; Höttges 75' (pen.)		Eggert 20'; Etterich 54'	Stadium: Weserstadion; Attendance: 7,500; Referee: Peter Kaufmann (Walldorf)

=== DFB-Pokal ===
9 December 1972 R1 1st leg	Wormatia Worms	4–4	VfL Bochum	Worms
14:00	Janzon 31' de Haas 37' (pen.); Dier 51'; Laube 74'		Balte 14', 32'; Lameck 15'; Krämer 18'	Stadium: Wormatia-Stadion; Attendance: 10,000; Referee: Fritz Seiler (Schmiden)

20 December 1972 R1 2nd leg	VfL Bochum	3–1 (7–5 agg.)	Wormatia Worms	Bochum
19:30	Majgl 33'; Köper 35'; Walitza 66'		Laube 26'	Stadium: Stadion an der Castroper Straße; Attendance: 5,000; Referee: Walter Niemann (Hamburg)

2 March 1973 R2 1st leg	VfL Bochum	4–4	SV Werder Bremen	Bochum
19:30	Walitza 28'; Balte 38', 82' (pen.); Galeski 61'		Neuberger 22', 70'; Laumen 47'; Görts 75'	Stadium: Stadion an der Castroper Straße; Attendance: 7,000; Referee: Franz Wengenmeyer (Munich)

14 March 1973 R2 2nd leg	SV Werder Bremen	2–1 (6–5 agg.)	VfL Bochum	Bremen
20:00	Höttges 29'; Kamp 75'		Wosab 6'	Stadium: Weserstadion; Attendance: 8,000; Referee: Rudolf Frickel (Munich)

=== DFB-Ligapokal ===
1 August 1972 GS 1	KSV Hessen Kassel	0–1	VfL Bochum
18:00			Hartl (?)

5 August 1972 GS 2	FC Schalke 04	4–2	VfL Bochum
20:00	H. Kremers (?); Fischer (?)		Walitza (?)

9 August 1972 GS 3	VfL Bochum	1–0	SpVgg Erkenschwick
18:00	Balte (?)

16 August 1972 GS 4	SpVgg Erkenschwick	1–3	VfL Bochum
18:00	Kolitsch (?)		Balte (?); Gerland (?)

19 August 1972 GS 5	VfL Bochum	1–4	FC Schalke 04
18:00	Balte (?)		Rüssmann (?); Frey (?); Braun (?)

23 August 1972 GS 6	VfL Bochum	5–1	KSV Hessen Kassel
18:00	Zorc (?); Köper (?); Majgl (?)		Hansmann

== Squad ==
=== Squad and statistics ===
==== Squad, appearances and goals scored ====
No.	Pos	Nat	Player	Total		Bundesliga		DFB-Pokal		DFB-Ligapokal	
No.	Pos	Nat	Player	Apps	Goals	Apps	Goals	Apps	Goals	Apps	Goals
	MF	(West Germany) FRG	Werner Balte	44	10	34	2	4	4	6	4
	DF	(West Germany) FRG	Heinz-Jürgen Blome	11	0	7	0	0	0	4	0
	MF	(West Germany) FRG	Udo Böckmann	2	0	0	0	0	0	2	0
	GK	(West Germany) FRG	Harry Bohrmann	0	0	0	0	0	0	0	0
	FW	(West Germany) FRG	Peter Bomm	2	0	1	0	0	0	1	0
	GK	(West Germany) FRG	Hans-Jürgen Bradler	8	0	7	0	0	0	1	0
	MF	(West Germany) FRG	Klaus-Dieter Dewinski	7	0	3	0	3	0	1	0
	MF	(West Germany) FRG	Michael Eggert	2	1	2	1	0	0	0	0
	MF	(West Germany) FRG	Hans-Günter Etterich	39	2	31	2	4	0	4	0
	DF	(West Germany) FRG	Harry Fechner	42	0	32	0	4	0	6	0
	DF	(West Germany) FRG	Erwin Galeski	34	1	27	0	2	1	5	0
	FW	(West Germany) FRG	Hermann Gerland	27	2	20	1	2	0	5	1
	FW	(West Germany) FRG	Hans-Werner Hartl	11	4	8	3	0	0	3	1
	DF	(West Germany) FRG	Werner Jablonski	1	0	1	0	0	0	0	0
	MF	(West Germany) FRG	Klaus-Peter Kerkemeier	0	0	0	0	0	0	0	0
	MF	(West Germany) FRG	Hans-Jürgen Köper	40	6	32	3	4	1	4	2
	FW	(West Germany) FRG	Werner Krämer	13	2	11	1	2	1	0	0
	MF	(West Germany) FRG	Michael Lameck	44	6	34	5	4	1	6	0
	MF	(West Germany) FRG	Franz-Josef Laufer	21	0	16	0	0	0	5	0
	FW	(West Germany) FRG	Reinhard Majgl	36	9	28	6	2	1	6	2
	DF	(West Germany) FRG	Manfred Rüsing	12	0	11	0	1	0	0	0
	GK	(West Germany) FRG	Werner Scholz	38	0	28	0	4	0	6	0
	DF	(West Germany) FRG	Dieter Versen	36	0	34	0	1	0	1	0
	FW	(West Germany) FRG	Hans Walitza	43	22	34	18	4	2	5	2
	DF	(West Germany) FRG	Reinhold Wosab	31	5	25	4	4	1	2	0
	DF	(West Germany) FRG	Dieter Zorc (until 20 November 1972)	5	1	0	0	0	0	5	1

=== Transfers ===
==== Summer ====
In:

No.	Pos.	Nation	Player
—	DF	FRG	Klaus-Dieter Dewinski (from TSG Herdecke)
—	FW	FRG	Hermann Gerland (from VfL Bochum youth)
—	MF	FRG	Michael Lameck (from Schwarz-Weiß Essen)
—	FW	FRG	Reinhard Majgl (from Schwarz-Weiß Essen)
—	GK	FRG	Werner Scholz (from Alemannia Aachen)

Out:

No.	Pos.	Nation	Player
—	FW	FRG	Dieter Fern (to Union Salzgitter)
—	DF	FRG	Gerd Wiesemes (to SC Westfalia Herne)

==== Winter ====
In:

No.	Pos.	Nation	Player
—	MF	FRG	Michael Eggert (from VfL Bochum II)

Out:

No.	Pos.	Nation	Player
—	DF	FRG	Dieter Zorc (to Lüner SV)
