= 1968 DFB-Pokal final =

- Match programme cover
- Event: 1967–68 DFB-Pokal
1. FC Köln	VfL Bochum
4	1
- Date: 9 June 1968
- Venue: Südweststadion, Ludwigshafen
- Referee: Karl Riegg (Augsburg)
- Attendance: 60,000

The 1968 DFB-Pokal final decided the winner of the 1967–68 DFB-Pokal, the 25th season of Germany's premier football cup. It was played on 9 June 1968 at the Südweststadion in Ludwigshafen.

== Route to the final ==
1. FC Köln		Round	VfL Bochum
Opponent	Result	1967–68 DFB-Pokal	Opponent	Result
Bye		Qualification Round 1	SG Wattenscheid 09	1–0
Bye		Qualification Round 2	TSV Marl-Hüls	2–1
Bye		Qualification Round 3	VfB Marathon Remscheid	5–3 (a.e.t.)
Bye		Qualification Round 4	Schwarz-Weiß Essen	2–1
FC 08 Homburg	4–1	Round 1	Karlsruher SC	3–2
Eintracht Frankfurt	1–1 (a.e.t.) and 1–0 (replay)	Round 2	VfB Stuttgart	2–1
Eintracht Braunschweig	1–1 (a.e.t.) and 2–1 (replay)	Quarterfinals	Borussia Mönchengladbach	2–0
Borussia Dortmund	3–0	Semifinals	FC Bayern Munich	2–1

== Match ==
=== Details ===
9 June 1968
16:00 CET

1. FC Köln	4–1	VfL Bochum
Jablonski 22' (o.g.); Rühl 38', 57'; Löhr 70'	Report	Böttcher 37'

Südweststadion, Ludwigshafen
Attendance: 60,000
Referee: Karl Riegg (Augsburg)

1. FC Köln	VfL Bochum

GK	1	(Socialist Federal Republic of Yugoslavia) Milutin Šoškić
RB		(West Germany) Fritz Pott
CB		(West Germany) Heinz Flohe
CB		(West Germany) Wolfgang Weber
LB		(West Germany) Matthias Hemmersbach
CM		(West Germany) Karl-Heinz Thielen (c)
CM		(West Germany) Heinz Simmet
CM		(West Germany) Wolfgang Overath
RW		(West Germany) Carl-Heinz Rühl
CF		(West Germany) Hannes Löhr
LW		(West Germany) Heinz Hornig
Manager:
(West Germany) Willi Multhaup

GK	1	(West Germany) Horst Christopeit (c)
RB	2	(West Germany) Gerd Wiesemes
CB	6	(West Germany) Werner Jablonski
CB	5	(West Germany) Heinz-Jürgen Blome
LB	3	(West Germany) Dieter Versen
CM	4	(West Germany) Erich Schiller
CM	8	(West Germany) Gustav Eversberg
CM	10	(West Germany) Hans-Jürgen Jansen	(substituted off) 61'
RW	7	(West Germany) Karl-Heinz Böttcher
CF	9	(West Germany) Heinz Höher
LW	11	(West Germany) Werner Balte
Substitutes:
MF	13	(West Germany) Dieter Moritz	(substituted in) 61'
Manager:
(West Germany) Hermann Eppenhoff

Match rules

- 90 minutes.
- 30 minutes of extra time if necessary.
- Replay if scores still level.
- Maximum of two substitutions.
