= Fotis Papadopoulos =

Fotis Papadopoulos may refer to:

- Fotis Papadopoulos (footballer, born 1954)
- Fotis Papadopoulos (footballer, born 1975)
