= Werner Jablonski =

German footballer (born 1938)

Personal information
- Date of birth: 26 June 1938 (age 88)
- Positions: Defender; midfielder

Senior career*
Years	Team	Apps	(Gls)
1958–1960	SC Dortmund 95	52	(12)
1960–1973	VfL Bochum	292	(62)
Total		344	(74)
- * Club domestic league appearances and goals

Werner Jablonski (born 26 June 1938) is a German retired professional footballer who played as a defender or midfielder.

== Career statistics ==
Club performance			League		Cup		Other		Total	
Season	Club	League	Apps	Goals	Apps	Goals	Apps	Goals	Apps	Goals
West Germany			League		DFB-Pokal		Other^{1}		Total	
1958–59	SC Dortmund 95	2. Oberliga West	25	0	—		—		25	0
1959–60	SC Dortmund 95	2. Oberliga West	27	12	—		—		27	12
1960–61	VfL Bochum	Oberliga West	26	6	0	0	—		26	6
1961–62	VfL Bochum	2. Oberliga West	17	8	—		—		17	8
1962–63	VfL Bochum	2. Oberliga West	28	18	—		—		28	18
1963–64	VfL Bochum	Verbandsliga Westfalen	20	10	—		—		20	10
1964–65	VfL Bochum	Verbandsliga Westfalen	25	8	—					
1965–66	VfL Bochum	Regionalliga West	25	2	—		—		25	2
1966–67	VfL Bochum	Regionalliga West	29	5	—		—		29	5
1967–68	VfL Bochum	Regionalliga West	32	0	3	0	—		35	0
1968–69	VfL Bochum	Regionalliga West	33	5	—		—		33	5
1969–70	VfL Bochum	Regionalliga West	28	0	—		4	0	32	0
1970–71	VfL Bochum	Regionalliga West	21	0	—		1	0	22	0
1971–72	VfL Bochum	Bundesliga	7	0	0	0	—		7	0
1972–73	VfL Bochum	Bundesliga	1	0	0	0	—		1	0
Total	West Germany		344	74	3	0				
Career total			344	74	3	0				

^{1} 1964–65 includes the Verbandsliga Westfalen promotion playoffs. 1969–70 and 1970–71 include the Regionalliga promotion playoffs.
