= Wolfgang Euteneuer =

German footballer

Personal information
- Full name: Wolfgang Euteneuer
- Date of birth: 1 September 1955 (age 71)
- Place of birth: Bad Berleburg, West Germany
- Position: Midfielder

Youth career
- FC Witten
- –1974: VfL Bochum

Senior career*
Years	Team	Apps	(Gls)
1974–1979	VfL Bochum II		
1975–1978	VfL Bochum	5	(0)
1979–	VfL Gevelsberg		
- * Club domestic league appearances and goals

Wolfgang Euteneuer (born 1 September 1955) is a retired German football midfielder.
