= Stadion am Schloss Strünkede =

Football stadium in Herne, Germany

Coordinates: 51°33′7″N 7°12′31″E

EDEKA Koch-Sportpark
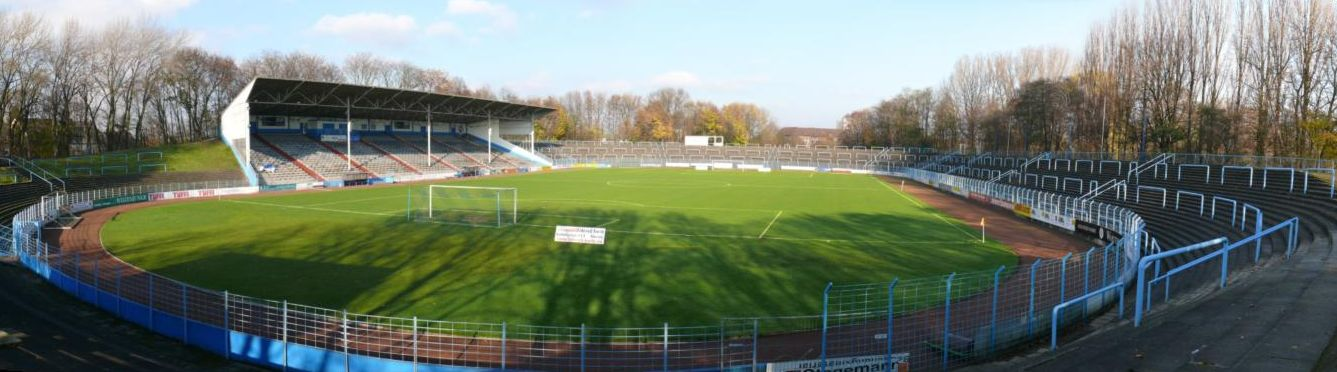
- Interactive map of EDEKA Koch-Sportpark
- Location: Herne, Germany
- Capacity: 32,000

Construction
- Opened: 1910
- Renovated: 1976, 2017–2018
- Expanded: 1950s

Tenant
- SC Westfalia Herne

Stadion am Schloss Strünkede is a football stadium in Herne, Germany. It is the home stadium of SC Westfalia Herne. The stadium holds 32,000 spectators and opened in 1910. At its heyday, it held up to 32,000 spectators, but renovations in the 1970s and the 2010s severely reduced the stadium's capacity.
