= Manfred Reichert =

German footballer

Personal information
- Date of birth: 29 October 1940
- Place of birth: Königsberg, East Prussia
- Date of death: 10 April 2010 (aged 69)
- Place of death: Remscheid, Germany
- Height: 1.77 m (5 ft 10 in)
- Position: Defender

Senior career*
| Years | Team | Apps | (Gls) |
| 1963–1974 | Wuppertaler SV | | |
- * Club domestic league appearances and goals

Manfred "Manni" Reichert (28 October 1940, Königsberg, East Prussia – 10 April 2010, Remscheid) was a German football defender. He played for Wuppertaler SV.
