= Friedhelm Dick =

German association football player

Personal information
- Date of birth: 3 April 1944
- Place of birth: Germany
- Date of death: 5 August 1999 (aged 55)
- Height: 1.80 m (5 ft 11 in)
- Position: Defender

Senior career*
Years	Team	Apps	(Gls)
1964–1967	Westfalia Herne	72	(1)
1967–1974	Rot-Weiß Oberhausen	223	(3)
- * Club domestic league appearances and goals

Friedhelm Dick (3 April 1944 – 5 August 1999) was a German footballer who played as a defender. He made 126 appearances in the Bundesliga, all of them for Rot-Weiß Oberhausen.
