= BV 04 Dortmund =

German association football club

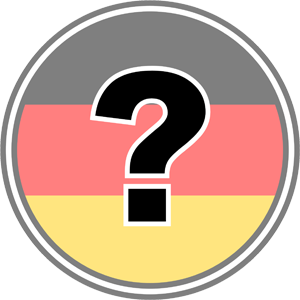
- Full name: Ballspielverein 1904 Dortmund
- Founded: 1904
- Dissolved: 1913
- 2008–09: defunct
Home colours	Away colours

BV 04 Dortmund was a German association football club from the city of Dortmund, North Rhine-Westphalia. The club was established in 1904 as the football department of an earlier gymnastics and fencing club called Turn- und Fechtclub Dortmund. The footballers became independent as Ballspielverein Dortmund in 1905.

== History ==
The team made a number of appearances (1907, 1909, 1913) in the playoffs of the regional top-flight Westdeutscher Fußballverband in the early 1900s. Their best performance came in 1909 when they beat Teutonia Osnabrück 4:3 in a quarterfinal matchup before going out 4:1 to Preußen Duisburg in the subsequent semifinal.

BV merged with Dortmunder Fußballclub 1895 to form Sportvereinigung Dortmund 1895 on 13 July 1913. In 1919, the club was renamed Dortmunder Sportclub 1895 and in 1933, entered into a short-lived union with Ballspiel-Club Sportfreunde 06 Dortmund to play until 1935 as Sportfreunde 1895 Dortmund.

Following the defeat of Germany in World War II, occupying Allied authorities banned most organizations in the country, including sports and football clubs. In late 1945, the club was reformed as Südliche Sportgemeinde Dortmund before resuming its identity as SC in 1947. Ultimately, SC merged with Turn- und Sportverein Eintracht 1848 Dortmund to create Turn- und Sport-Club Eintracht 48/95 Dortmund, which is still active today.
