= Heinz-Jürgen Blome =

German footballer

Personal information
- Full name: Heinz-Jürgen Blome
- Date of birth: 14 December 1946
- Date of death: 7 November 2012 (aged 65)
- Position: Defender

Youth career
- –1965: VfL Bochum

Senior career*
Years	Team	Apps	(Gls)
1965–1973	VfL Bochum	144	(1)
1973–1974	VfL Witten		
Medal record
VfL Bochum
Runner-up	DFB-Pokal	1967–68
Runner-up	Regionalliga West	1968–69
Winner	Regionalliga West	1969–70
Winner	Regionalliga West	1970–71
- * Club domestic league appearances and goals

Heinz-Jürgen Blome (14 December 1946 – 7 November 2012) was a German association football defender.

== Career ==
=== Statistics ===
Club performance			League		Cup		League Cup		Other		Total	
Season	Club	League	Apps	Goals	Apps	Goals	Apps	Goals	Apps	Goals	Apps	Goals
West Germany			League		DFB-Pokal		DFB-Ligapokal		Other^{1}		Total	
1965–66	VfL Bochum	Regionalliga West	7	0	—		—		—		7	0
1966–67	VfL Bochum	Regionalliga West	17	0	—		—		—		17	0
1967–68	VfL Bochum	Regionalliga West	18	0	5	0	—		—		23	0
1968–69	VfL Bochum	Regionalliga West	33	1	—		—		—		33	1
1969–70	VfL Bochum	Regionalliga West	29	0	—		—		5	0	34	0
1970–71	VfL Bochum	Regionalliga West	24	0	—		—		8	0	32	0
1971–72	VfL Bochum	Bundesliga	9	0	2	0	—		—		11	0
1972–73	VfL Bochum	Bundesliga	7	0	0	0	4	0	—		11	0
1973–74	VfL Witten	Verbandsliga Westfalen			—		—		—			
Total	West Germany				7	0	4	0	13	0		
Career total					7	0	4	0	13	0		

^{1} 1969–70 and 1970–71 include the Regionalliga promotion playoffs.
