= Erich Miß =

German footballer

Personal information
- Full name: Erich Miß
- Date of birth: 16 March 1948 (age 78)
- Place of birth: Wuppertal, Germany
- Position: Defender

Senior career*
Years	Team	Apps	(Gls)
1967–1974	Wuppertaler SV		
1974–1976	VfL Bochum	23	(1)
1976–1981	Wuppertaler SV		
- * Club domestic league appearances and goals

Erich Miß (born 16 March 1948) is a retired German football defender.
