= Peter Kursinski =

German footballer

Personal information
- Full name: Peter Kursinski
- Date of birth: 15 August 1956 (age 70)
- Position: Forward

Youth career
- –1974: VfL Bochum

Senior career*
Years	Team	Apps	(Gls)
1974–1978	VfL Bochum	10	(0)
1978–?	VfL Bochum II		
- * Club domestic league appearances and goals

Peter Kursinski (born 15 August 1956) is a retired German football forward.
