= Hans-Joachim Pochstein =

German footballer

Personal information
- Full name: Hans-Joachim Pochstein
- Date of birth: 30 October 1952
- Date of death: 5 June 1991 (aged 38)
- Position: Forward

Senior career*
| Years | Team | Apps | (Gls) |
| –1974 | BV Brambauer | | |
| 1974–1979 | VfL Bochum | 99 | (6) |
| 1979–? | BV Brambauer | | |
- * Club domestic league appearances and goals

Hans-Joachim Pochstein (30 October 1952 – 5 June 1991) was a German football forward.
