= Reinhard Majgl =

German footballer

Personal information
- Full name: Reinhard Majgl
- Date of birth: 4 December 1949 (age 76)
- Height: 1.70 m (5 ft 7 in)
- Position: Forward

Senior career*
Years	Team	Apps	(Gls)
1970–1972	Schwarz-Weiß Essen		
1972–1974	VfL Bochum	44	(10)
1974–1975	K.A.S. Eupen		
1975–1978	SC Fortuna Köln	40	(1)
1978–1979	1. FC Viersen		
1979–1983	1. FC Bocholt		
- * Club domestic league appearances and goals

Reinhard Majgl (born 4 December 1949) is a retired German football forward.

== Career ==
=== Statistics ===
Club performance			League		Cup		League Cup		Total	
Season	Club	League	Apps	Goals	Apps	Goals	Apps	Goals	Apps	Goals
West Germany			League		DFB-Pokal		DFB-Ligapokal		Total	
1970–71	Schwarz-Weiß Essen	Regionalliga West			—		—			
1971–72	Schwarz-Weiß Essen	Regionalliga West			—		—			
1972–73	VfL Bochum	Bundesliga	28	6	2	1	6	2	36	9
1973–74	VfL Bochum	Bundesliga	16	4	0	0	—		16	4
Belgium			League		Belgian Cup		Belgian League Cup		Total	
1974–75	K.A.S. Eupen	Second Division			—		—			
West Germany			League		DFB-Pokal		DFB-Ligapokal		Total	
1975–76	SC Fortuna Köln	2. Bundesliga	11	0	1	0	—		12	0
1976–77	SC Fortuna Köln	2. Bundesliga	13	0	0	0	—		13	0
1977–78	SC Fortuna Köln	2. Bundesliga	16	1	0	0	—		16	1
1978–79	1. FC Viersen	Oberliga Nordrhein			—		—			
1979–80	1. FC Bocholt	Oberliga Nordrhein			2	4	—			
1980–81	1. FC Bocholt	2. Bundesliga	36	11	—		—		36	11
1981–82	1. FC Bocholt	Oberliga Nordrhein			5	3	—			
1982–83	1. FC Bocholt	Oberliga Nordrhein			—		—			
Total	West Germany				10	8	6	2		
Total	Belgium				0	0	0	0		
Career total					10	8	6	2		
