= Peter Bomm =

German footballer

Personal information
- Full name: Peter Bomm
- Date of birth: 9 December 1947 (age 78)
- Position: Forward

Senior career*
Years	Team	Apps	(Gls)
1972–1974	VfL Bochum	3	(0)
- * Club domestic league appearances and goals

Peter Bomm (born 9 December 1947) is a retired German football forward.
