= Josef Kaczor =

German footballer

Jupp Kaczor
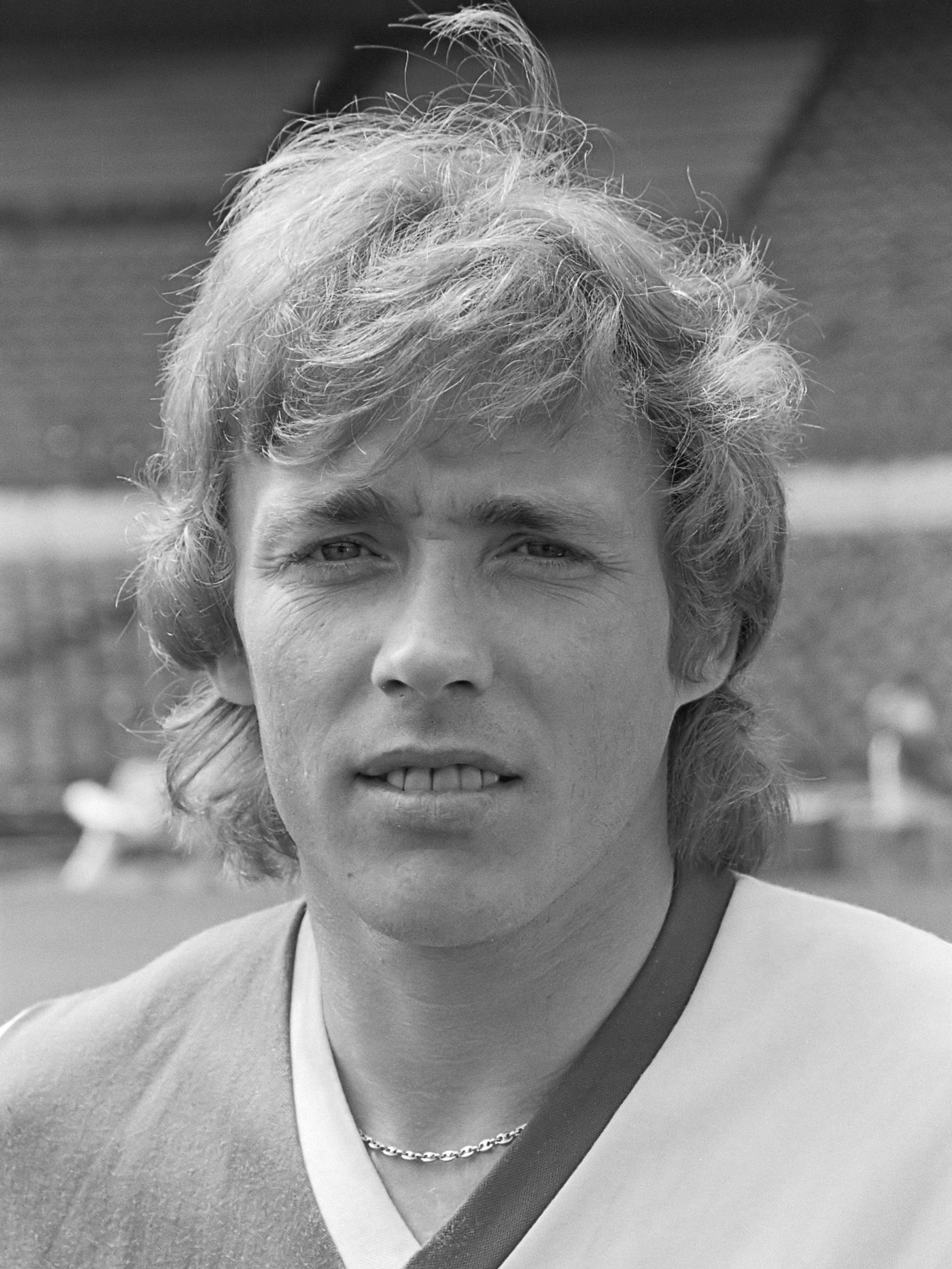
- Jupp Kaczor (1982)

Personal information
- Full name: Josef Kaczor
- Date of birth: 23 March 1953 (age 73)
- Place of birth: Hamm, West Germany
- Position: Forward

Senior career*
Years	Team	Apps	(Gls)
1971–1973	Hammer SpVg		
1973–1974	SV Eintracht Heessen		
1974–1981	VfL Bochum	142	(51)
1981–1983	Feyenoord	39	(14)
1982–1983	→ Eintracht Frankfurt (loan)	15	(1)
1983–1985	SV Eintracht Heessen		
1986	SuS Hüsten		
1988	TuS Wiescherhöfen		
- * Club domestic league appearances and goals

Josef "Jupp" Kaczor (born 23 March 1953) is a retired German football striker.
