= Klaus-Peter Kerkemeier =

German footballer

Personal information
- Full name: Klaus-Peter Kerkemeier
- Date of birth: 13 November 1951 (age 74)
- Position: Midfielder

Youth career
- –1970: VfL Bochum

Senior career*
Years	Team	Apps	(Gls)
1970–1973	VfL Bochum	1	(0)
1973–1977	Westfalia Herne		
1977–1981	SpVgg Erkenschwick		
- * Club domestic league appearances and goals

Klaus-Peter Kerkemeier (born 13 November 1951) is a retired German football midfielder.
