= Hans-Günter Etterich =

German footballer

Personal information
- Date of birth: 16 August 1951 (age 75)
- Place of birth: Bochum, West Germany
- Height: 1.72 m (5 ft 8 in)
- Position: Midfielder

Youth career
- –1970: VfL Bochum

Senior career*
Years	Team	Apps	(Gls)
1970–1974	VfL Bochum	77	(10)
1974–1979	SC Westfalia Herne		
1979	San Jose Earthquakes	27	(4)
1979–1980	Wuppertaler SV	14	(1)
1980–1981	FSV Frankfurt	25	(4)
1981–1983	TuS Schloß Neuhaus		
- * Club domestic league appearances and goals

Hans-Günter Etterich (born 16 August 1951) is a German former professional footballer who played as a midfielder.

== Career statistics ==
Appearances and goals by club, season and competition
Club	Season	League			National cup		League cup		Total	
Club	Season	Division	Apps	Goals	Apps	Goals	Apps	Goals	Apps	Goals
VfL Bochum	1970–71	Regionalliga West	5	0	—		—		5	0
VfL Bochum	1971–72	Bundesliga	20	5	3	1	—		23	6
VfL Bochum	1972–73	Bundesliga	31	2	4	0	4	0	39	2
VfL Bochum	1973–74	Bundesliga	21	3	1	0	—		22	3
VfL Bochum	Total		77	10	8	1	4	0	89	11
SC Westfalia Herne	1974–75	Verbandsliga Westfalen			0	0	—			
SC Westfalia Herne	1975–76	2. Bundesliga	15	1	1	0	—		16	1
SC Westfalia Herne	1976–77	2. Bundesliga	34	3	1	0	—		35	3
SC Westfalia Herne	1977–78	2. Bundesliga	32	2	5	0	—		37	2
SC Westfalia Herne	1978–79	2. Bundesliga	8	0	1	0	—		9	0
SC Westfalia Herne	Total				8	0	0	0		
San Jose Earthquakes	1979	NASL	27	4	—		—		27	4
Wuppertaler SV	1979–80	2. Bundesliga]	14	1	0	0	—		14	1
FSV Frankfurt	1980–81	2. Bundesliga]	25	4	2	1	—		27	5
TuS Schloß Neuhaus	1981–82	Verbandsliga Westfalen			—		—			
TuS Schloß Neuhaus	1982–83	2. Bundesliga]	4	0	1	0	—		5	0
TuS Schloß Neuhaus	Total				1	0	0	0		
Career total					19	2	4	0		
