= Gisbert Horsthemke =

German footballer

Personal information
- Full name: Gisbert Horsthemke
- Date of birth: 26 January 1953 (age 73)
- Position: Midfielder

Senior career*
Years	Team	Apps	(Gls)
–1974	SV Eintracht Heessen		
1974–1975	VfL Bochum II		
1974–1975	VfL Bochum	2	(0)
1975–1988	SpVgg Erkenschwick		
1988	SV Germania Datteln		
1989	SpVgg Erkenschwick	10	(0)
1989–	SV Germania Datteln		
- * Club domestic league appearances and goals

Gisbert Horsthemke (born 26 January 1953) is a retired German football midfielder.
