= Klaus Franke =

German footballer

Personal information
- Full name: Klaus Franke
- Date of birth: 23 May 1948 (age 78)
- Position: Defender

Senior career*
Years	Team	Apps	(Gls)
1972–1973	Schwarz-Weiss Essen		
1973–1980	VfL Bochum	104	(1)
- * Club domestic league appearances and goals

Klaus Franke (born 23 May 1948) is a retired German football defender.
