= Hans-Jürgen Köper =

German footballer and manager

Personal information
- Full name: Hans-Jürgen Köper
- Date of birth: 29 August 1951 (age 75)
- Height: 1.74 m (5 ft 9 in)
- Position: Midfielder

Youth career
- –1968: SG Preußen Ehrenfeld
- 1968–1970: VfL Bochum

Senior career*
Years	Team	Apps	(Gls)
1970–1980	VfL Bochum	171	(22)
- * Club domestic league appearances and goals

Hans-Jürgen Köper (born 29 August 1951) is a German football manager and former player who played as a midfielder.

== Career statistics ==
Appearances and goals by club, season and competition
Club	Season	League			DFB-Pokal		Total	
Club	Season	Division	Apps	Goals	Apps	Goals	Apps	Goals
VfL Bochum	1970–71	Regionalliga West	26	5	—		26	5
VfL Bochum	1971–72	Bundesliga	17	2	0	0	17	2
VfL Bochum	1972–73	Bundesliga	32	3	4	1	36	4
VfL Bochum	1973–74	Bundesliga	9	0	0	0	9	0
VfL Bochum	1974–75	Bundesliga	24	5	5	1	29	6
VfL Bochum	1975–76	Bundesliga	34	4	4	2	38	6
VfL Bochum	1976–77	Bundesliga	20	2	3	0	23	2
VfL Bochum	1977–78	Bundesliga	0	0	0	0	0	0
VfL Bochum	1978–79	Bundesliga	9	1	2	0	11	1
VfL Bochum	1979–80	Bundesliga	0	0	0	0	0	0
Career total			171	22	18	4	189	26
