= Mutterstadt =

- Municipality
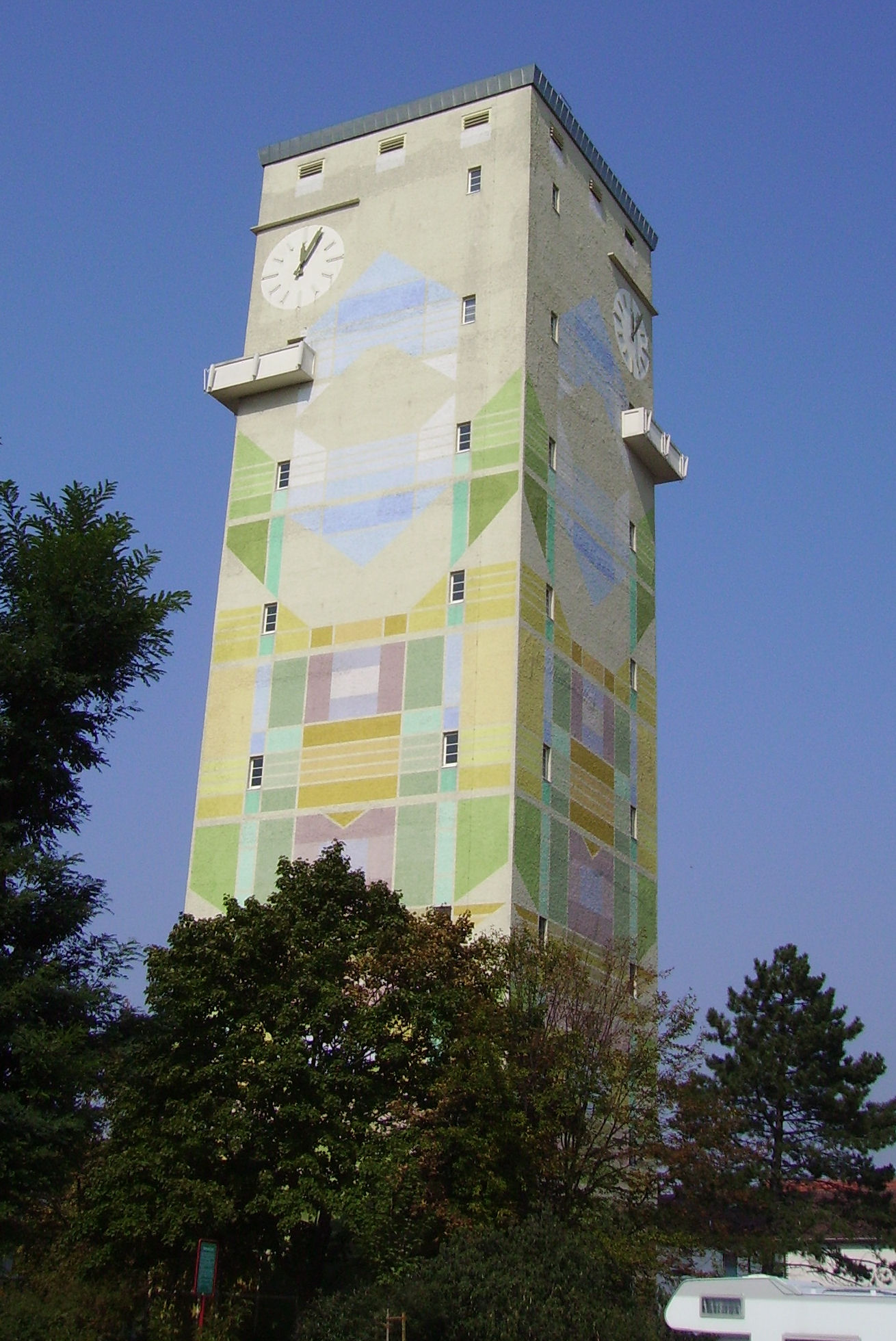

- Coat of arms

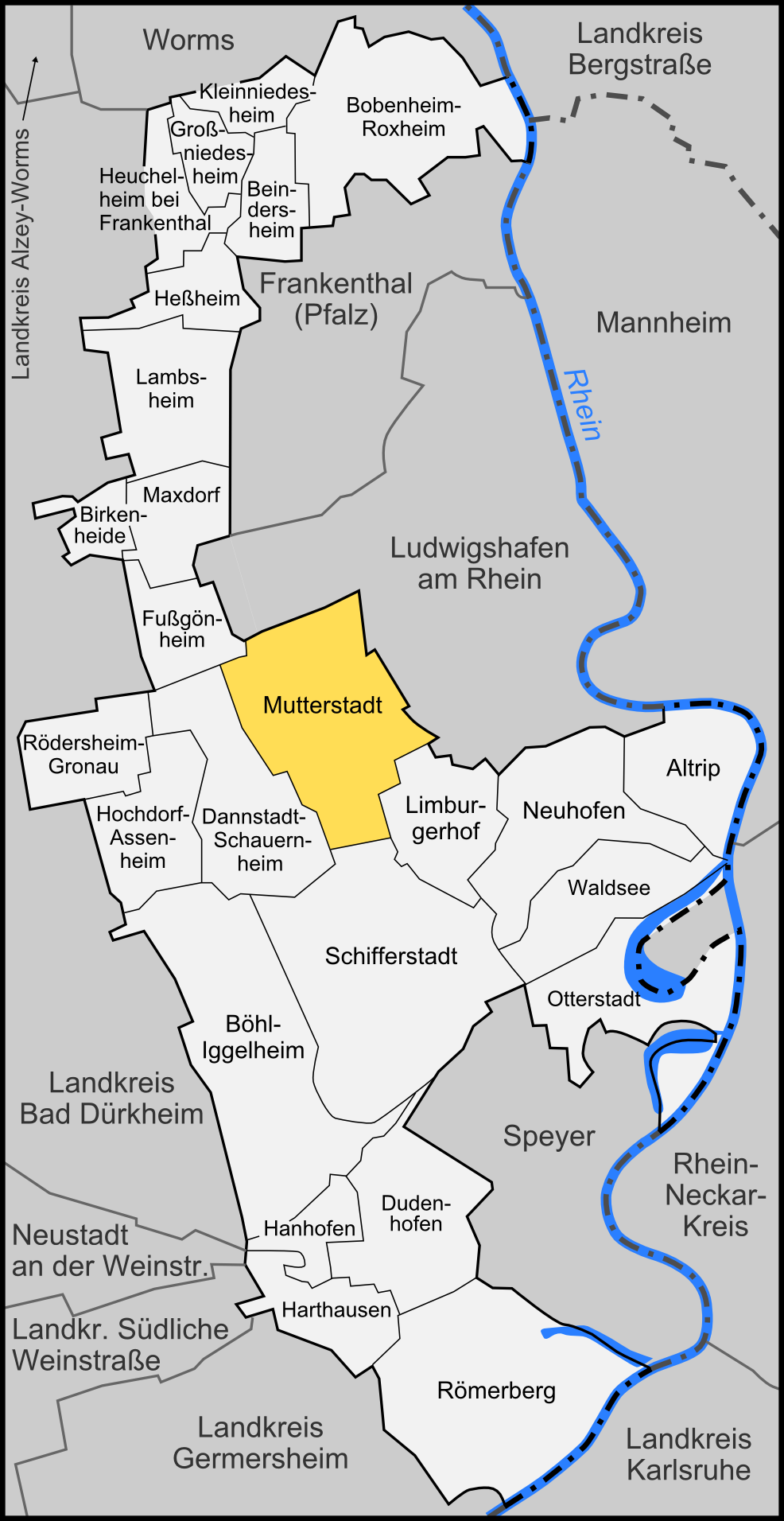
- Location of Mutterstadt within Rhein-Pfalz-Kreis district
- Interactive map of Mutterstadt
- Location within Germany Location within Rhineland-Palatinate
- Coordinates: 49°26′N 8°21′E
- Country: Germany
- State: Rhineland-Palatinate
- District: Rhein-Pfalz-Kreis

Government
  - Mayor (2023–31): Thorsten Leva (SPD)

Area
  - Total: 20.47 km^{2} (7.90 sq mi)
- Elevation: 97 m (318 ft)

Population (2025-12-31)
  - Total: 13,357
  - Density: 652.5/km^{2} (1,690/sq mi)
- Time zone: UTC+01:00 (CET)
  - Summer (DST): UTC+02:00 (CEST)
- Postal codes: 67112
- Dialling codes: 06234
- Vehicle registration: RP
- Website: www.mutterstadt.de

Mutterstadt (German pronunciation: [ˈmʊtɐʃtat]) is a municipality in the Rhein-Pfalz-Kreis, in Rhineland-Palatinate, Germany. Though classified as rural the municipality does contain urbanized areas.

It is situated approximately 7 km southwest of the city center of Ludwigshafen.

== History ==
Mutterstadt was first mentioned in the Lorsch codex in the year 767 as mutherstather marca. The name Mutterstadt is derived from the medieval personal name Muothari (or Muther) and not from the German word Mutter.

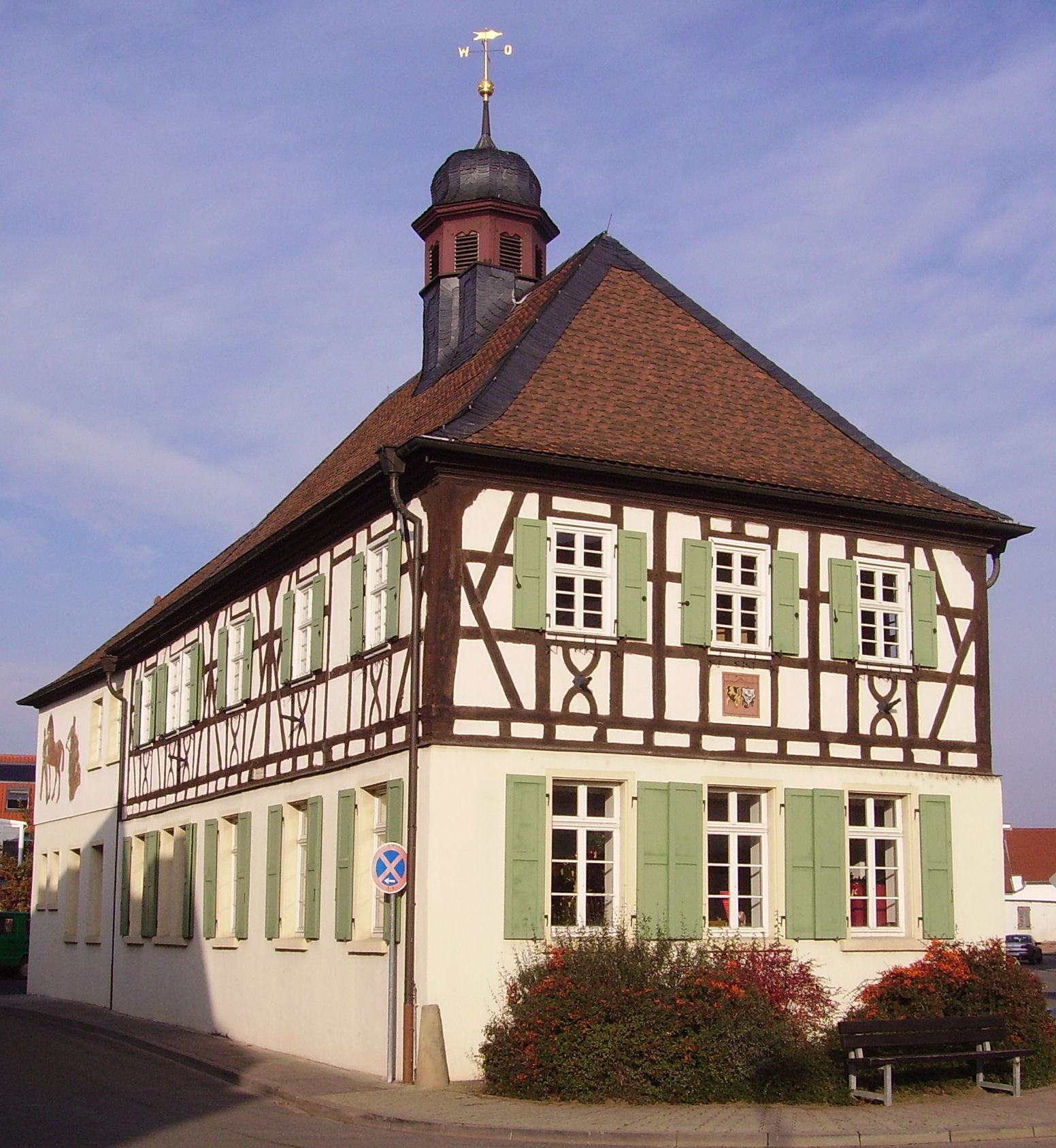
Old town hall

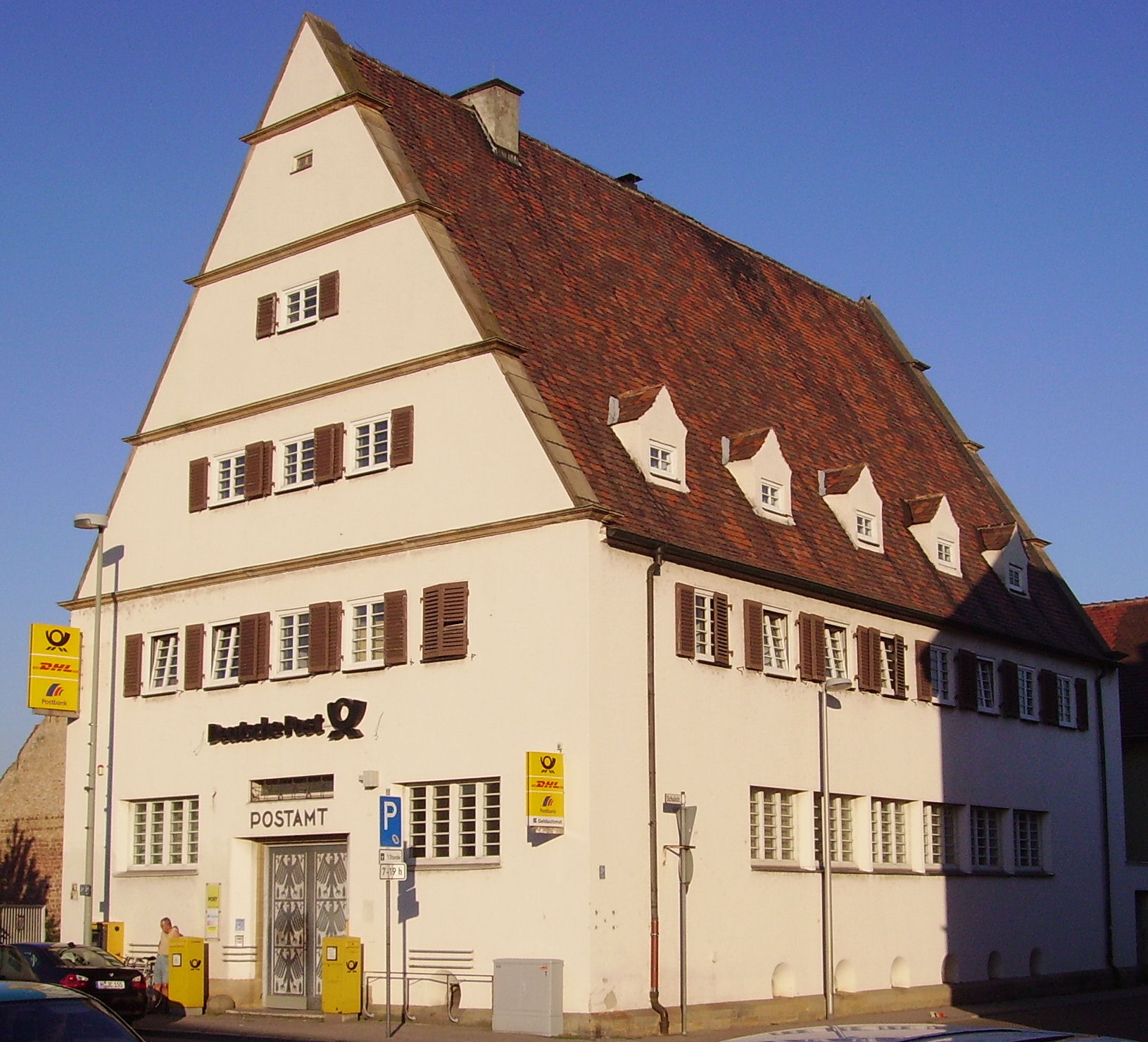
Former Post office

== News ==
On the 9th of August 2016 a suspected IS terrorist was apprehended on suspicion of planning an attack during a soccer match
