= Hans-Jürgen Bradler =

German footballer

Personal information
- Full name: Hans-Jürgen Bradler
- Date of birth: 12 August 1948 (age 78)
- Place of birth: Bochum, Allied-occupied Germany
- Position: Goalkeeper

Senior career*
Years	Team	Apps	(Gls)
–1970	TB 1954 Eickel		
1970–1975	VfL Bochum	66	(0)
1975–1982	SC Westfalia Herne		

International career
1970–1972	West Germany Olympic	20	(0)
- * Club domestic league appearances and goals

Hans-Jürgen Bradler (born 12 August 1948) is a retired German football goalkeeper.

== Career statistics ==
Club performance			League		Cup		League Cup		Other		Total	
Season	Club	League	Apps	Goals	Apps	Goals	Apps	Goals	Apps	Goals	Apps	Goals
West Germany			League		DFB-Pokal		DFB-Ligapokal		Other		Total	
1969–70	TB 1954 Eickel	Verbandsliga Westfalen			—		—		—			
1970–71	VfL Bochum	Regionalliga West	22	0	—		—		8 (Note: Appearances in the 1970–71 Regionalliga promotion play-offs.)	0	30	0
1971–72	VfL Bochum	Bundesliga	34	0	4	0	—		—		38	0
1972–73	VfL Bochum	Bundesliga	7	0	0	0	1	0	—		8	0
1973–74	VfL Bochum	Bundesliga	1	0	0	0	—		—		1	0
1974–75	VfL Bochum	Bundesliga	2	0	1	0	—		—		3	0
1975–76	SC Westfalia Herne	2. Bundesliga	31	0	2	0	—		—		33	0
1976–77	SC Westfalia Herne	2. Bundesliga	4	0	0	0	—		—		4	0
1977–78	SC Westfalia Herne	2. Bundesliga	30	0	4	0	—		—		34	0
1978–79	SC Westfalia Herne	2. Bundesliga	6	0	1	0	—		—		7	0
1979–80	SC Westfalia Herne	Oberliga Westfalen			2	0	—		—			
1980–81	SC Westfalia Herne	Oberliga Westfalen			—		—		—			
1981–82	SC Westfalia Herne	Oberliga Westfalen			—		—		—			
Total	West Germany				14	0	1	0	8	0		
Career total					14	0	1	0	8	0		
