= Harry Bohrmann =

German footballer

Personal information
- Full name: Harry Bohrmann
- Date of birth: 26 March 1952 (age 74)
- Position: Goalkeeper

Senior career*
Years	Team	Apps	(Gls)
–1971	DSC Wanne-Eickel		
1971–1974	VfL Bochum	1	(0)
1974–?	BV Herne-Süd 1913		
- * Club domestic league appearances and goals

Harry Bohrmann (born 26 March 1952) is a retired German football goalkeeper.
