= Fotis Papadopoulos (footballer, born 1954) =

Greek footballer

Personal information
- Full name: Fotios Papadopoulos
- Date of birth: 1 July 1954 (age 72)
- Place of birth: Kilkis, Greece
- Positions: Defender; midfielder

Youth career
- 1965–1972: DJK Adler Dahlhausen

Senior career*
Years	Team	Apps	(Gls)
1972–1974	VfL Bochum II		
1974	VfL Bochum	2	(0)
1974–1977	Kalamata F.C.		
- * Club domestic league appearances and goals

Fotis Papadopoulos (Greek: Φώτης Παπαδόπουλος; born 1 July 1954) is a retired Greek footballer.

== Career ==
=== Statistics ===
Club performance			League		Cup		Total	
Season	Club	League	Apps	Goals	Apps	Goals	Apps	Goals
West Germany			League		DFB-Pokal		Total	
1972–73	VfL Bochum II				—			
1973–74	VfL Bochum II	Landesliga Westfalen			—			
1973–74	VfL Bochum	Bundesliga	2	0	0	0	2	0
Greece			League		Greek Cup		Total	
1974–75	Kalamata F.C.	Alpha Ethniki						
1975–76	Kalamata F.C.	Beta Ethniki						
1976–77	Kalamata F.C.	Beta Ethniki						
Total	West Germany							
Total	Greece							
Career total								
