= Michael Lameck =

German footballer (born 1949)

Ata Lameck
Personal information
- Full name: Michael Lameck
- Date of birth: 15 September 1949 (age 77)
- Place of birth: Essen, West Germany
- Height: 1.74 m (5 ft 9 in)
- Positions: Left-back; sweeper

Youth career
- 1966–1968: TuS Essen-West

Senior career*
Years	Team	Apps	(Gls)
1968–1969	TuS Essen-West	17	(1)
1969–1972	Schwarz-Weiß Essen	73	(15)
1972–1988	VfL Bochum	518	(37)
1988–1989	TuS Paderborn-Neuhaus	36	(3)
1989–1990	Freiburger FC	3	(0)
Total		647	(56)

International career
1973	West Germany U-23	2	(0)
1977–1978	West Germany B	9	(0)

Managerial career
- 1988–1989: TuS Paderborn-Neuhaus
- 1989–1990: Freiburger FC
- * Club domestic league appearances and goals

Michael Lameck, known as Ata (born 15 September 1949) is a German former professional footballer who played as a left-back or sweeper.

== Career ==
Lameck started his career during the Regionalliga West 1969–70 season with Schwarz-Weiß Essen. During his time in Bochum from 1972 until 1988, he played a total of 518 matches in the Bundesliga, and is thereby the record holder for most matches played for the Ruhr Valley team while being ninth on the all-time Bundesliga list for matches played. Additionally, he holds the distinction of having played the most matches in Bundesliga history without ever receiving a cap for national duty.

== Career statistics ==
Appearances and goals by club, season and competition
Club	Season	League			DFB-Pokal		Total	
Club	Season	Division	Apps	Goals	Apps	Goals	Apps	Goals
TuS Essen-West	1968–69		17	1	–		17	1
Schwarz-Weiß Essen	1969–70	Regionalliga West	13	1	1	0	14	1
Schwarz-Weiß Essen	1970–71	Regionalliga West	26	1	—		26	1
Schwarz-Weiß Essen	1971–72	Regionalliga West	34	13	—		34	13
VfL Bochum	1972–73	Bundesliga	34	5	4	1	38	6
VfL Bochum	1973–74	Bundesliga	34	2	2	0	36	2
VfL Bochum	1974–75	Bundesliga	34	4	5	1	39	5
VfL Bochum	1975–76	Bundesliga	34	6	4	0	38	6
VfL Bochum	1976–77	Bundesliga	30	2	3	0	33	2
VfL Bochum	1977–78	Bundesliga	34	3	4	0	38	3
VfL Bochum	1978–79	Bundesliga	34	1	5	2	36	3
VfL Bochum	1979–80	Bundesliga	33	2	4	0	37	2
VfL Bochum	1980–81	Bundesliga	34	1	4	1	38	2
VfL Bochum	1981–82	Bundesliga	32	2	7	0	39	2
VfL Bochum	1982–83	Bundesliga	34	3	5	1	39	4
VfL Bochum	1983–84	Bundesliga	34	1	1	0	35	1
VfL Bochum	1984–85	Bundesliga	33	0	3	1	36	1
VfL Bochum	1985–86	Bundesliga	34	2	5	1	39	2
VfL Bochum	1986–87	Bundesliga	34	3	1	0	35	3
VfL Bochum	1987–88	Bundesliga	16	0	4	0	20	0
TuS Paderborn-Neuhaus	1988–89	Oberliga Westfalen	26	3	–		26	3
TuS Paderborn-Neuhaus	1989–90	Oberliga Westfalen	10	0	–		10	0
Freiburger FC	1989–90	Oberliga Baden-Württemberg	3	0	—		3	0
Career total			647	56	62	8	709	64

== Honours ==
VfL Bochum

- DFB-Pokal: runner-up 1987–88
