= Franz-Josef Tenhagen =

German footballer and manager

Jupp Tenhagen
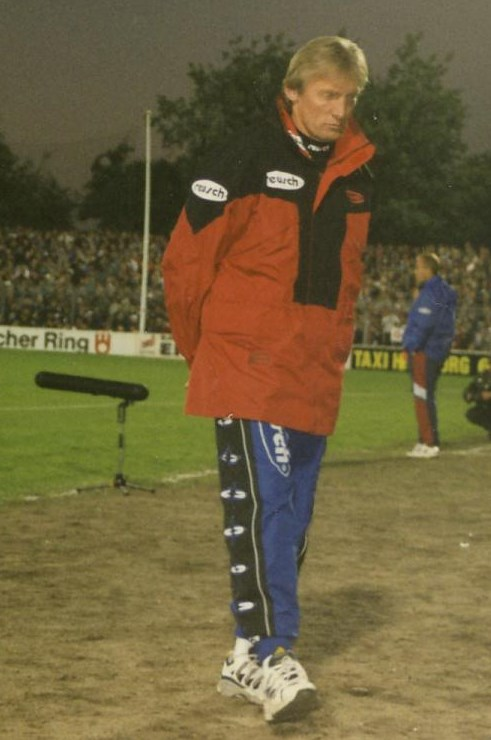
- Tenhagen as trainer of SG Wattenscheid 1997

Personal information
- Full name: Franz-Josef Tenhagen
- Date of birth: 31 October 1952 (age 73)
- Place of birth: Millingen, West Germany
- Height: 1.82 m (6 ft 0 in)
- Positions: Midfielder; defender

Senior career*
Years	Team	Apps	(Gls)
1971–1973	Rot-Weiß Oberhausen	64	(6)
1973–1981	VfL Bochum	257	(18)
1981–1984	Borussia Dortmund	87	(0)
1984–1988	VfL Bochum	49	(1)

International career
1976–1978	West Germany B	3	(0)
1977	West Germany	3	(0)

Managerial career
- 1988–1989: VfL Bochum
- 1989–1990: SC Fortuna Köln
- 1991–1996: 1. FC Bocholt
- 1996–1998: SG Wattenscheid 09
- 1998–2000: Rot Weiss Ahlen
- 2003–2007: 1. FC Bocholt
- * Club domestic league appearances and goals

Franz-Josef 'Jupp' Tenhagen (born 31 October 1952 in Millingen) is a retired German football player and a football coach.

== Career ==
The defensive footballer played 457 games and scored 25 goals in the Bundesliga.

Tenhagen won three caps for West Germany in 1977.

== Career statistics ==
Club performance			League		Cup		League Cup		Continental		Total	
Season	Club	League	Apps	Goals	Apps	Goals	Apps	Goals	Apps	Goals	Apps	Goals
West Germany			League		DFB-Pokal		Other		Europe		Total	
1971–72	Rot-Weiß Oberhausen	Bundesliga	30	2	5	0	–		–		35	2
1972–73	Rot-Weiß Oberhausen	Bundesliga	34	4	4	1	–		–		38	5
1973–74	VfL Bochum	Bundesliga	33	3	2	0	–		–		35	3
1974–75	VfL Bochum	Bundesliga	33	4	4	2	–		–		37	6
1975–76	VfL Bochum	Bundesliga	34	2	4	0	–		–		38	2
1976–77	VfL Bochum	Bundesliga	34	3	3	0	–		–		37	3
1977–78	VfL Bochum	Bundesliga	34	3	3	0	–		–		37	3
1978–79	VfL Bochum	Bundesliga	32	1	5	0	–		–		37	1
1979–80	VfL Bochum	Bundesliga	34	1	4	0	–		–		38	1
1980–81	VfL Bochum	Bundesliga	23	1	2	0	–		–		25	1
1981–82	Borussia Dortmund	Bundesliga	34	0	3	1	–		–		37	1
1982–83	Borussia Dortmund	Bundesliga	31	0	5	0	–		2	0	38	0
1983–84	Borussia Dortmund	Bundesliga	22	0	1	0	–		–		23	0
1984–85	VfL Bochum	Bundesliga	24	1	2	0	–		–		26	1
1985–86	VfL Bochum	Bundesliga	24	0	5	1	–		–		29	1
1986–87	VfL Bochum	Bundesliga	0	0	0	0	–		–		0	0
1987–88	VfL Bochum	Bundesliga	1	0	0	0	–		–		1	0
Total	West Germany		457	25	52	5			2	0		
Career total			457	25	52	5			2	0		

== Honours ==
- DFB-Pokal: runner-up 1987–88
