= Paul Holz =

German footballer

Personal information
- Full name: Paul Holz
- Date of birth: 27 September 1952
- Place of birth: Bottrop, West Germany
- Date of death: 11 December 2017 (aged 65)
- Height: 1.78 m (5 ft 10 in)
- Position: Midfielder

Youth career
- –1971: Rhenania Bottrop

Senior career*
Years	Team	Apps	(Gls)
1971–1974	FC Schalke 04	59	(3)
1974–1975	VfL Bochum	34	(7)
1975–1976	Hannover 96	36	(6)
1976–1979	VfL Bochum	65	(6)
1979–1981	Borussia Dortmund	19	(0)
1981–1989	1. FC Bocholt		
1989–1991	VfL Rhede		
- * Club domestic league appearances and goals

Paul Holz (27 September 1952 – 11 December 2017) was a German football midfielder.
