= Franz-Josef Laufer =

German footballer

Personal information
- Full name: Franz-Josef Laufer
- Date of birth: 1 September 1952 (age 74)
- Height: 1.77 m (5 ft 9 1/2 in)
- Position: Midfielder

Senior career*
Years	Team	Apps	(Gls)
–1971	SpVgg Erkenschwick		
1971–1974	VfL Bochum	44	(0)
1974–1977	Schwarz-Weiss Essen	101	(1)
1977–1980	Westfalia Herne		
1980–1982	SpVgg Erkenschwick		
- * Club domestic league appearances and goals

Franz-Josef Laufer (born 1 September 1952) is a retired German football midfielder.
