= Harry Fechner =

German footballer (born 1950)

Personal information
- Date of birth: 4 May 1950 (age 76)
- Position: Defender

Youth career
- 1959–1969: VfL Bochum

Senior career*
Years	Team	Apps	(Gls)
1969–1970	VfL Bochum II		
1970–1976	VfL Bochum	97	
1975	→ 1. FC Saarbrücken (loan)	2	(0)
1975–1976	→ DJK Gütersloh (loan)	30	(1)
- * Club domestic league appearances and goals

Harry Fechner (born 4 May 1950) is a German former professional footballer who played as a defender. He is the father of fellow professional footballer Gino Fechner.

== Career statistics ==
Appearances and goals by club, season and competition
Club	Season	League			DFB-Pokal		Total	
Club	Season	Division	Apps	Goals	Apps	Goals	Apps	Goals
VfL Bochum	1970–71	Regionalliga West	13		—		13	
VfL Bochum	1971–72	Bundesliga	23	3	4	0	27	3
VfL Bochum	1972–73	Bundesliga	32	0	4	0	36	0
VfL Bochum	1973–74	Bundesliga	29	1	2	0	31	1
VfL Bochum	1974–75	Bundesliga	0	0	0	0	0	0
VfL Bochum	Total		97		10	0	107	
1. FC Saarbrücken	1975–76	2. Bundesliga	2	0	1	0	3	0
DJK Gütersloh	1975–76	2. Bundesliga	30	1	2	0	32	1
Career total			128		13	0	142	
