= Altendiez =

Place in Rhineland-Palatinate, Germany

- Municipality
- Coat of arms

- Location of Altendiez within Rhein-Lahn-Kreis district
- Interactive map of Altendiez
- Location within Germany Location within Rhineland-Palatinate
- Coordinates: 50°22′17″N 7°59′6″E
- Country: Germany
- State: Rhineland-Palatinate
- District: Rhein-Lahn-Kreis
- Municipal assoc.: Diez

Government
  - Mayor (2019–24): Thomas Keßler

Area
  - Total: 9.22 km^{2} (3.56 sq mi)
- Elevation: 170 m (560 ft)

Population (2025-12-31)
  - Total: 2,211
  - Density: 240/km^{2} (621/sq mi)
- Time zone: UTC+01:00 (CET)
  - Summer (DST): UTC+02:00 (CEST)
- Postal codes: 65624
- Dialling codes: 06432
- Vehicle registration: EMS, DIZ, GOH
- Website: www.altendiez.de

Altendiez is a municipality in the district of Rhein-Lahn, in Rhineland-Palatinate, in western Germany. It belongs to the association community of Diez.
