= Erwin Galeski =

German footballer

Personal information
- Full name: Erwin Galeski
- Date of birth: 29 October 1945 (age 81)
- Position: Defender

Senior career*
Years	Team	Apps	(Gls)
1965–1975	VfL Bochum		
1975–?	Vorwärts Herne		
- * Club domestic league appearances and goals

Erwin Galeski (born 29 October 1945) is a retired German football defender.

Club performance			League		Cup		Total	
Season	Club	League	Apps	Goals	Apps	Goals	Apps	Goals
West Germany			League		DFB-Pokal		Total	
1965–66	VfL Bochum	Regionalliga West			—			
1966–67	VfL Bochum	Regionalliga West			—			
1967–68	VfL Bochum	Regionalliga West			1	0		
1968–69	VfL Bochum	Regionalliga West			—			
1969–70	VfL Bochum	Regionalliga West			—			
1970–71	VfL Bochum	Regionalliga West			—			
1971–72	VfL Bochum	Bundesliga	27	0	2	0	29	0
1972–73	VfL Bochum	Bundesliga	27	0	2	1	29	1
1973–74	VfL Bochum	Bundesliga	30	0	0	0	30	0
1974–75	VfL Bochum	Bundesliga	2	0	1	0	3	0
Total	West Germany				6	1		
Career total					6	1		
