= Volker Roth =

German football referee (1942–2025)

- Born: 1 February 1942; Salzgitter, Gau Southern Hanover-Brunswick, Germany
- Died: 17 February 2025 (aged 83)

Domestic
Years	League	Role
1972–1986	Bundesliga	Referee

International
Years	League	Role
1978–1986	FIFA-listed	Referee

Volker Roth (1 February 1942 – 17 February 2025) was a German football referee. He is mostly known for refereeing two matches in the 1986 FIFA World Cup in Mexico. After retiring, he became a referee's advisor for UEFA. Roth died on 17 February 2025, at the age of 83.
