= Hartmut Fromm =

German footballer

Personal information
- Full name: Hartmut Fromm
- Date of birth: 15 October 1950 (age 76)
- Position: Defender

Senior career*
Years	Team	Apps	(Gls)
–1973	RW Unna		
1973–1977	VfL Bochum	93	(4)
1977–1979	Westfalia Herne	21	(0)
- * Club domestic league appearances and goals

Hartmut Fromm (born 15 October 1950) is a retired German football defender.
