= Ole Bjørnmose =

Danish footballer (1944–2006)

Personal information
- Date of birth: May 7, 1944
- Place of birth: Odense, Denmark
- Date of death: September 5, 2006 (aged 62)
- Place of death: Strib, Denmark
- Height: 1.78 m (5 ft 10 in)
- Positions: Striker; midfielder

Senior career*
Years	Team	Apps	(Gls)
1965–1966	Boldklubben 1909		
1966–1971	Werder Bremen	137	(21)
1971–1977	Hamburger SV	186	(31)

International career
1966	Denmark U21	2	(0)
1971–1977	Denmark	16	(2)
- * Club domestic league appearances and goals

Ole Bjørnmose (May 7, 1944 – September 5, 2006) was a Danish football player. He spent 11 seasons in the Bundesliga with Werder Bremen and Hamburger SV.

== Honours ==
Hamburger SV

- UEFA Cup Winners' Cup: 1976–77
- DFB-Pokal: 1975–76
