= Heinz-Werner Eggeling =

German footballer

Personal information
- Full name: Heinz-Werner Eggeling
- Date of birth: 17 April 1955 (age 71)
- Height: 1.85 m (6 ft 1 in)
- Position: Forward

Youth career
- –1973: VfL Bochum

Senior career*
Years	Team	Apps	(Gls)
1973–1979	VfL Bochum	148	(20)
1979–1980	Eintracht Braunschweig	16	(4)
1980–1981	Bayer 05 Uerdingen	33	(10)
1981–1983	Borussia Dortmund	27	(3)
1984	VfL Osnabrück	17	(4)

International career
1978	West Germany B	2	(1)
- * Club domestic league appearances and goals

Heinz-Werner Eggeling (born 17 April 1955) is a retired German football forward.
