= Michael Eggert (footballer) =

German footballer (born 1952)

Personal information
- Full name: Michael Eggert
- Date of birth: 29 September 1952 (age 74)
- Height: 1.72 m (5 ft 7 1/2 in)
- Position: Midfielder

Senior career*
Years	Team	Apps	(Gls)
1972–1980	VfL Bochum	206	(26)
1980–1982	1. FC Nürnberg	27	(4)
Total		233	(30)

International career
1978	West Germany B	2	(0)
- * Club domestic league appearances and goals

Michael Eggert (born 29 September 1952) is a retired German footballer.

Club performance			League		Cup		Total	
Season	Club	League	Apps	Goals	Apps	Goals	Apps	Goals
Germany			League		DFB-Pokal		Total	
1972–73	VfL Bochum	Bundesliga	2	1	0	0	2	1
1973–74	VfL Bochum	Bundesliga	25	2	1	0	26	2
1974–75	VfL Bochum	Bundesliga	29	2	5	0	34	0
1975–76	VfL Bochum	Bundesliga	32	4	4	0	36	4
1976–77	VfL Bochum	Bundesliga	32	3	0	0	32	3
1977–78	VfL Bochum	Bundesliga	32	3	4	0	36	3
1978–79	VfL Bochum	Bundesliga	31	8	5	0	36	8
1979–80	VfL Bochum	Bundesliga	23	3	4	0	27	3
1980–81	1. FC Nürnberg	Bundesliga	16	2	4	0	20	2
1981–82	1. FC Nürnberg	Bundesliga	11	2	2	1	13	3
Total	Germany		233	30	29	1	262	31
Career total			233	30	29	1	262	31
