= Klaus-Dieter Dewinski =

German footballer

Personal information
- Full name: Klaus-Dieter Dewinski
- Date of birth: 31 August 1950 (age 76)
- Position: Defender

Senior career*
Years	Team	Apps	(Gls)
–1972	TSG Herdecke		
1972–1976	VfL Bochum	19	(1)
1976–1977	Bonner SC	17	(0)
1978–1979	Würzburger Kickers	32	(0)
- * Club domestic league appearances and goals

Klaus-Dieter Dewinski (born 31 August 1950) is a retired German football defender.
