= Werner Balte =

German footballer (1948–2007)

Personal information
- Date of birth: 17 February 1948
- Place of birth: Bochum, Germany
- Date of death: 17 March 2007 (aged 59)
- Position: Midfielder

Senior career*
Years	Team	Apps	(Gls)
1966–1977	VfL Bochum	281	(97)
Total		281	(97)
- * Club domestic league appearances and goals

Werner Balte (17 February 1948 – 17 March 2007) was a German footballer who played as a midfielder.

== Career ==
Balte won the German Goal of the Month for June 1971.

== Career statistics ==
Appearances and goals by club, season and competition
Club	Season	League			DFB-Pokal		DFB-Ligapokal		Other		Total	
Club	Season	Division	Apps	Goals	Apps	Goals	Apps	Goals	Apps	Goals	Apps	Goals
VfL Bochum	1966–67	Regionalliga West	13	4	—		—		—		13	4
VfL Bochum	1967–68	Regionalliga West	19	14	5	4	—		—		24	18
VfL Bochum	1968–69	Regionalliga West	33	20	—		—		—		33	20
VfL Bochum	1969–70	Regionalliga West	21	5	—		—		5 (Note: Appearances in Regionalliga promotion playoffs)	0	26	5
VfL Bochum	1970–71	Regionalliga West	25	16	—		—		8	3	33	19
VfL Bochum	1971–72	Bundesliga	31	8	4	0	—		—		35	8
VfL Bochum	1972–73	Bundesliga	34	2	4	4	6	4	—		44	10
VfL Bochum	1973–74	Bundesliga	34	11	2	0	—		—		36	11
VfL Bochum	1974–75	Bundesliga	34	14	5	0	—		—		39	14
VfL Bochum	1975–76	Bundesliga	27	3	4	2	—		—		31	5
VfL Bochum	1976–77	Bundesliga	10	0	2	0	—		—		12	0
Career total			281	97	26	10	6	4	13	3	326	114
