= Dieter Versen =

German footballer (1945–2025)

Personal information
- Date of birth: 22 June 1945
- Place of birth: Bochum, Allied-occupied Germany
- Date of death: 8 April 2025 (aged 79)
- Height: 1.71 m (5 ft 7 in)
- Position: Left-back

Youth career
- 1959–1963: VfL Bochum

Senior career*
Years	Team	Apps	(Gls)
1963–1979	VfL Bochum	317	(18)
1979	San Jose Earthquakes	29	(1)
Total		346	(19)
Medal record
VfL Bochum
Winner	Verbandsliga Westfalen	1964–65
Runner-up	DFB-Pokal	1967–68
Runner-up	Regionalliga West	1968–69
Winner	Regionalliga West	1969–70
Winner	Regionalliga West	1970–71
- * Club domestic league appearances and goals

Dieter Versen (22 June 1945 – 8 April 2025) was a German professional footballer who played as a left-back. Versen died on 8 April 2025, at the age of 79.

== Career statistics ==
Appearances and goals by club, season and competition
Club	Season	League			National cup		League cup		Other		Total	
Club	Season	Division	Apps	Goals	Apps	Goals	Apps	Goals	Apps	Goals	Apps	Goals
VfL Bochum	1963–64	Verbandsliga Westfalen	10	1	—		—		—		10	1
VfL Bochum	1964–65	Verbandsliga Westfalen	15	1	—		—		(Note: Appearances in Verbandsliga Westfalen promotion playoffs)			
VfL Bochum	1965–66	Regionalliga West	12	0	—		—		—		12	0
VfL Bochum	1966–67	Regionalliga West	12	1	—		—		—		12	1
VfL Bochum	1967–68	Regionalliga West	29	3	5	0	—		—		34	3
VfL Bochum	1968–69	Regionalliga West	34	5	—		—		—		34	5
VfL Bochum	1969–70	Regionalliga West	31	2	—		—		8 (Note: Appearances in Regionalliga promotion playoffs)	1	39	3
VfL Bochum	1970–71	Regionalliga West	16	1	—		—		8	1	24	2
VfL Bochum	1971–72	Bundesliga	23	0	4	0	—		—		27	0
VfL Bochum	1972–73	Bundesliga	34	0	1	0	1	0	—		36	0
VfL Bochum	1973–74	Bundesliga	34	2	2	1	—		—		36	3
VfL Bochum	1974–75	Bundesliga	28	1	5	0	—		—		33	1
VfL Bochum	1975–76	Bundesliga	13	0	2	0	—		—		15	0
VfL Bochum	1976–77	Bundesliga	0	0	0	0	—		—		0	0
VfL Bochum	1977–78	Bundesliga	15	1	1	0	—		—		16	1
VfL Bochum	1978–79	Bundesliga	11	0	0	0	—		—		11	0
VfL Bochum	Total		317	18	20	1	1	0				
San Jose Earthquakes	1979	NASL	29	1	—		—		—		29	1
Career total			346	19	20	1	1	0				
