= Heinz Höher =

German footballer and manager (1938–2019)

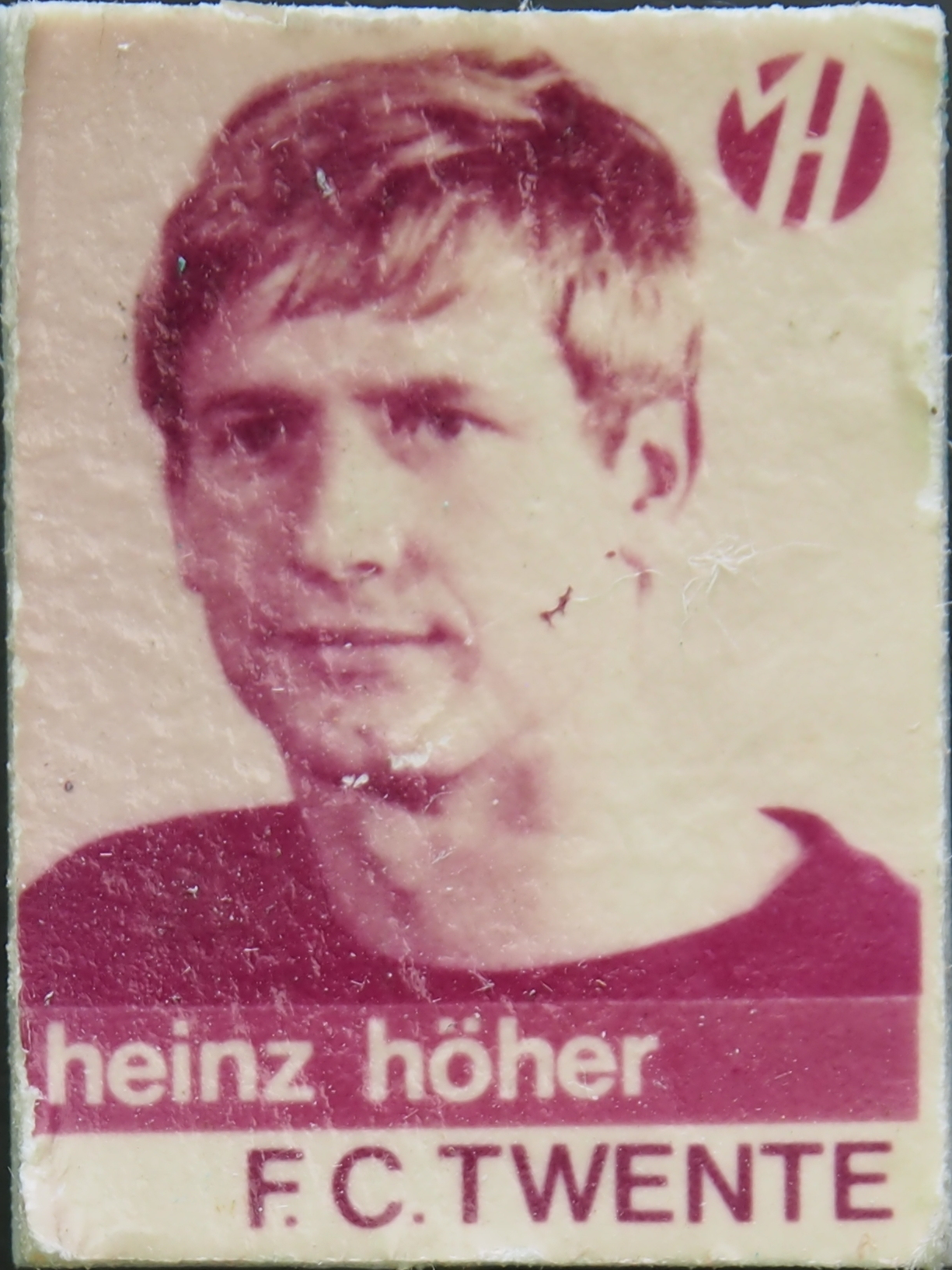
- Höher with FC Twente

Personal information
- Date of birth: 11 August 1938
- Place of birth: Leverkusen, Germany
- Date of death: 7 November 2019 (aged 81)
- Height: 1.78 m (5 ft 10 in)
- Positions: Midfielder; striker

Youth career
- 1948–1957: Bayer Leverkusen

Senior career*
Years	Team	Apps	(Gls)
1957–1963	Bayer Leverkusen	155	(60)
1963–1965	Meidericher SV	20	(0)
1965–1966	FC Twente	21	(2)
1966–1970	VfL Bochum	70	(20)
Total		266	(82)

International career
1959–1962	West Germany Olympic	9	(4)

Managerial career
- 1970: VfL Bochum (assistant)
- 1970–1972: Schwarz-Weiß Essen
- 1972–1979: VfL Bochum
- 1979–1980: MSV Duisburg
- 1980–1981: Fortuna Düsseldorf
- 1981: Ethnikos Piraeus
- 1981–1983: PAOK
- 1983: Olympiacos
- 1984–1988: 1. FC Nürnberg
- 1988–1989: Al-Ittihad
- 1996: VfB Lübeck
- * Club domestic league appearances and goals

Heinz Höher (11 August 1938 – 7 November 2019) was a German football player and manager.

== Playing career ==
Höher played for Bayer Leverkusen, Meidericher SV, FC Twente and VfL Bochum.

== Coaching career ==
Höher coached Schwarz-Weiß Essen, VfL Bochum, MSV Duisburg, Fortuna Düsseldorf, Ethnikos Piraeus F.C., PAOK, Olympiacos and 1. FC Nürnberg.

== Career statistics ==
Appearances and goals by club, season and competition
Club	Season	League			Cup		Other		Total	
Club	Season	Division	Apps	Goals	Apps	Goals	Apps	Goals	Apps	Goals
Bayer Leverkusen	1957–58	2. Oberliga West	26	8	—		—		26	8
Bayer Leverkusen	1958–59	2. Oberliga West	28	15	—		—		28	15
Bayer Leverkusen	1959–60	2. Oberliga West	22	9	—		—		22	9
Bayer Leverkusen	1960–61	2. Oberliga West	27	11	—		—		27	11
Bayer Leverkusen	1961–62	2. Oberliga West	27	15	—		—		27	15
Bayer Leverkusen	1962–63	Oberliga West	25	2	—		—		25	2
Bayer Leverkusen	Total		155	60	0	0	0	0	155	60
Meidericher SV	1963–64	Bundesliga	10	0	0	0	—		10	0
Meidericher SV	1964–65	Bundesliga	10	0	0	0	—		10	0
Meidericher SV	Total		20	0	0	0	0	0	20	0
FC Twente	1965–66	Eredivisie	21	2	2	1	—		23	3
VfL Bochum	1966–67	Regionalliga West	18	3	—		—		18	3
VfL Bochum	1967–68	Regionalliga West	19	7	3	0	—		22	7
VfL Bochum	1968–69	Regionalliga West	26	10	—		—		26	10
VfL Bochum	1969–70	Regionalliga West	7	0	—		5 (Note: Appearances in Regionalliga promotion playoffs)	1	12	1
VfL Bochum	Total		70	20	3	0	5	1	78	21
Career total			266	82	5	1	5	1	276	84
