= 1970–71 Regionalliga =

Regionalliga
- Season: 1970–71
- Champions: VfL Osnabrück Tasmania 1900 Berlin VfL Bochum Borussia Neunkirchen: 1. FC Nürnberg
- Promoted: VfL Bochum Fortuna Düsseldorf
- Relegated: VfB Oldenburg SV Meppen SC Staaken VfL Nord Berlin Bonner SC Sportfreunde Hamborn Saar 05 Saarbrücken VfB Theley VfR Mannheim SV Göppingen FC Wacker München Viktoria Aschaffenburg

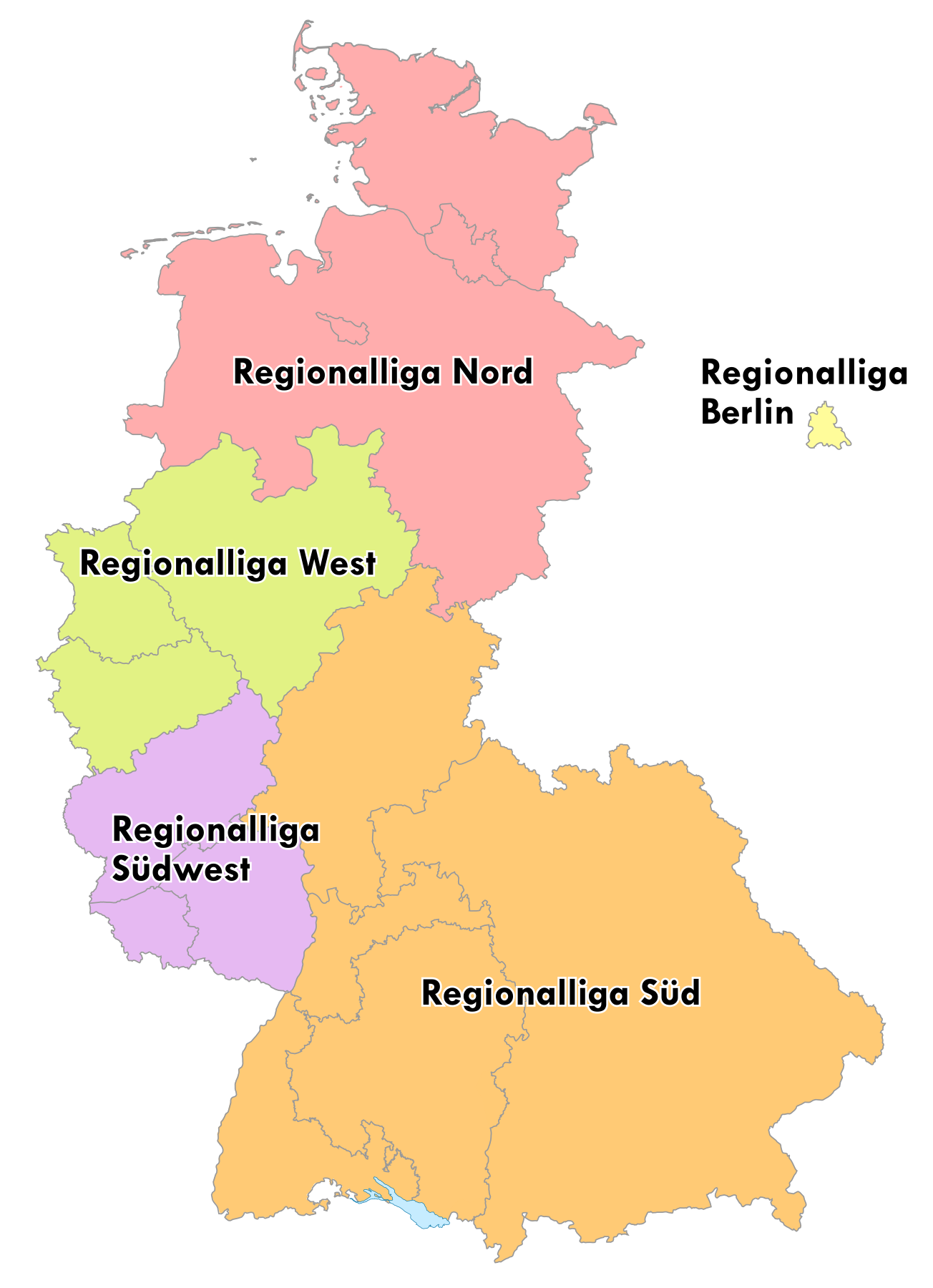
Map of the five German Regionalligas from 1963 to 1974

The 1970–71 Regionalliga was the eighth season of the Regionalliga, the second tier of the German football league system. The league operated in five regional divisions, Berlin, North, South, Southwest and West. The five league champions and all five runners-up, at the end of the season, entered a promotion play-off to determine the two clubs to move up to the Bundesliga for the next season. The two promotion spots went to the Regionalliga West champions and runners-up VfL Bochum and Fortuna Düsseldorf.

== Regionalliga Nord ==
The 1970–71 season saw three new clubs in the league, SV Meppen, SC Sperber Hamburg and Heider SV, all three promoted from the Amateurliga, while no club had been relegated from the Bundesliga to the league.

Pos	Team	Pld	W	D	L	GF	GA	GD	Pts	Promotion, qualification or relegation
1	VfL Osnabrück	34	16	12	6	70	39	+31	44	Qualification to promotion playoffs
2	FC St. Pauli	34	17	9	8	53	31	+22	43	Qualification to promotion playoffs
3	VfB Lübeck	34	16	10	8	63	45	+18	42	
4	Holstein Kiel	34	17	8	9	66	50	+16	42	
5	HSV Barmbek-Uhlenhorst	34	15	11	8	63	39	+24	41	
6	Olympia Wilhelmshaven	34	14	13	7	37	27	+10	41	
7	Göttingen 05	34	13	12	9	63	42	+21	38	
8	TuS Bremerhaven 93	34	15	7	12	54	48	+6	37	
9	VfL Wolfsburg	34	12	12	10	56	48	+8	36	
10	TuS Celle	34	12	9	13	52	55	−3	33	
11	SC Leu Braunschweig	34	12	6	16	59	55	+4	30	
12	Itzehoer SV	34	11	8	15	49	65	−16	30	
13	Phönix Lübeck	34	9	11	14	38	58	−20	29	
14	Arminia Hannover	34	10	8	16	46	61	−15	28	
15	SC Sperber Hamburg	34	8	12	14	34	51	−17	28	
16	Heider SV	34	8	11	15	38	56	−18	27	
17	VfB Oldenburg (R)	34	9	8	17	40	57	−17	26	Relegation to Amateurliga
18	SV Meppen (R)	34	5	7	22	43	97	−54	17	Relegation to Amateurliga

Source: Fussballdaten.de (in German)
Rules for classification: 1) Points;
(R) Relegated

== Regionalliga Berlin ==
The 1970–71 season saw two new clubs in the league, VfL Nord Berlin and Alemannia 90 Berlin, both promoted from the Amateurliga, while no club had been relegated from the Bundesliga to the league.

Pos	Team	Pld	W	D	L	GF	GA	GD	Pts	Promotion, qualification or relegation
1	Tasmania 1900 Berlin	33	29	3	1	110	20	+90	61	Qualification to promotion playoffs
2	Wacker 04 Berlin	33	24	3	6	75	34	+41	51	Qualification to promotion playoffs
3	Blau-Weiß 90 Berlin	33	24	2	7	95	38	+57	50	
4	Tennis Borussia Berlin	33	20	4	9	68	39	+29	44	
5	Hertha Zehlendorf	33	14	6	13	75	63	+12	34	
6	Spandauer SV	33	13	7	13	59	70	−11	33	
7	TuS Wannsee	33	10	6	17	48	84	−36	26	
8	Alemannia 90 Berlin	33	8	8	17	41	61	−20	24	
9	Rapide Wedding	33	6	11	16	46	66	−20	23	
10	1. FC Neukölln	33	7	7	19	53	78	−25	21	
11	SC Staaken (R)	33	7	7	19	35	76	−41	21	Relegation to Amateurliga
12	VfL Nord Berlin (R)	33	2	4	27	31	107	−76	8	Relegation to Amateurliga

Source: Fussballdaten.de (in German)
Rules for classification: 1) Points;
(R) Relegated

== Regionalliga West ==
The 1970–71 season saw three new clubs in the league, Eintracht Gelsenkirchen and Westfalia Herne, both promoted from the Amateurliga, while Alemannia Aachen had been relegated from the Bundesliga to the league.

Pos	Team	Pld	W	D	L	GF	GA	GD	Pts	Promotion, qualification or relegation
1	VfL Bochum (P)	34	26	4	4	81	27	+54	56	Qualification to promotion playoffs
2	Fortuna Düsseldorf (P)	34	25	6	3	70	26	+44	56	Qualification to promotion playoffs
3	Wuppertaler SV	34	24	7	3	81	27	+54	55	
4	Fortuna Köln	34	16	7	11	71	46	+25	39	
5	Eintracht Gelsenkirchen	34	17	5	12	62	54	+8	39	
6	Alemannia Aachen	34	15	4	15	59	58	+1	34	
7	Bayer Leverkusen	34	13	7	14	64	62	+2	33	
8	DJK Gütersloh	34	14	5	15	49	58	−9	33	
9	Preußen Münster	34	13	5	16	62	57	+5	31	
10	Viktoria Köln	34	10	11	13	36	46	−10	31	
11	Schwarz-Weiß Essen	34	10	9	15	56	63	−7	29	
12	Westfalia Herne	34	11	7	16	45	72	−27	29	
13	Wattenscheid 09	34	9	10	15	45	52	−7	28	
14	Lüner SV	34	10	7	17	53	59	−6	27	
15	SpVgg Erkenschwick	34	11	4	19	37	62	−25	26	
16	VfR Neuß	34	8	8	18	48	68	−20	24	
17	Bonner SC (R)	34	9	6	19	37	66	−29	24	Relegation to Amateurliga
18	Sportfreunde Hamborn (R)	34	6	6	22	36	89	−53	18	Relegation to Amateurliga

Source: Fussballdaten.de (in German)
Rules for classification: 1) Points;
(P) Promoted; (R) Relegated

== Regionalliga Südwest ==
The 1970–71 season saw two new clubs in the league, VfB Theley and VfR Frankenthal, both promoted from the Amateurliga, while no club had been relegated from the Bundesliga to the league.

Pos	Team	Pld	W	D	L	GF	GA	GD	Pts	Promotion, qualification or relegation
1	Borussia Neunkirchen	30	18	8	4	82	26	+56	44	Qualification to promotion playoffs
2	FK Pirmasens	30	19	6	5	69	29	+40	44	Qualification to promotion playoffs
3	Südwest Ludwigshafen	30	18	7	5	56	22	+34	43	
4	1. FC Saarbrücken	30	16	7	7	61	39	+22	39	
5	SV Alsenborn	30	16	6	8	77	49	+28	38	
6	TuS Neuendorf	30	16	6	8	51	29	+22	38	
7	FSV Mainz 05	30	15	5	10	57	49	+8	35	
8	FC Homburg	30	12	6	12	46	50	−4	30	
9	ASV Landau	30	10	9	11	36	43	−7	29	
10	Röchling Völklingen	30	11	5	14	43	50	−7	27	
11	Eintracht Trier	30	7	10	13	53	68	−15	24	
12	Wormatia Worms	30	9	5	16	44	58	−14	23	
13	VfR Frankenthal	30	6	10	14	33	53	−20	22	
14	FV Speyer	30	7	7	16	46	66	−20	21	
15	Saar 05 Saarbrücken (R)	30	2	8	20	26	85	−59	12	Relegation to Amateurliga
16	VfB Theley (R)	30	5	1	24	32	96	−64	11	Relegation to Amateurliga

Source: Fussballdaten.de (in German)
Rules for classification: 1) Points;
(R) Relegated

== Regionalliga Süd ==
The 1970–71 season saw four new clubs in the league, SV Göppingen, FC Wacker München and Viktoria Aschaffenburg, all threepromoted from the Amateurliga, while TSV 1860 München had been relegated from the Bundesliga to the league.

Pos	Team	Pld	W	D	L	GF	GA	GD	Pts	Promotion, qualification or relegation
1	1. FC Nürnberg	36	23	9	4	81	39	+42	55	Qualification to promotion playoffs
2	Karlsruher SC	36	19	7	10	59	40	+19	45	Qualification to promotion playoffs
3	Hessen Kassel	36	17	9	10	71	45	+26	43	
4	TSV 1860 München	36	16	9	11	59	40	+19	41	
5	Jahn Regensburg	36	17	7	12	65	64	+1	41	
6	FC Schweinfurt 05	36	15	10	11	73	58	+15	40	
7	SpVgg Fürth	36	14	11	11	55	38	+17	39	
8	VfR Heilbronn	36	14	11	11	6	50	−44	39	
9	Freiburger FC	36	14	9	13	60	55	+5	37	
10	Stuttgarter Kickers	36	15	7	14	59	63	−4	37	
11	ESV Ingolstadt	36	13	10	13	54	56	−2	36	
12	FC 08 Villingen	36	13	9	14	43	50	−7	35	
13	FC Bayern Hof	36	13	8	15	52	52	0	34	
14	Opel Rüsselsheim	36	11	11	14	41	49	−8	33	
15	SSV Reutlingen	36	12	8	16	53	59	−6	32	
16	VfR Mannheim (R)	36	9	13	14	50	68	−18	31	Relegation to Amateurliga
17	SV Göppingen (R)	36	7	14	15	47	67	−20	28	Relegation to Amateurliga
18	Viktoria Aschaffenburg (R)	36	6	8	22	42	83	−41	20	Relegation to Amateurliga
19	Wacker München (R)	36	4	10	22	39	88	−49	18	Relegation to Amateurliga

Source: Fussballdaten.de (in German)
Rules for classification: 1) Points;
(R) Relegated

== Bundesliga promotion round ==
=== Group 1 ===
Pos	Team	Pld	W	D	L	GF	GA	GD	Pts	Promotion, qualification or relegation
1	VfL Bochum (P)	8	7	0	1	23	11	+12	14	Promotion to Bundesliga
2	VfL Osnabrück	8	3	1	4	11	13	−2	7	
3	FK Pirmasens	8	3	1	4	11	14	−3	7	
4	Karlsruher SC	8	3	1	4	9	12	−3	7	
5	Tasmania 1900 Berlin	8	2	1	5	13	17	−4	5	

Source: Fussballdaten.de (in German)
Rules for classification: 1) Points;
(P) Promoted

=== Group 2 ===
Pos	Team	Pld	W	D	L	GF	GA	GD	Pts	Promotion, qualification or relegation
1	Fortuna Düsseldorf (P)	8	6	2	0	19	7	+12	14	Promotion to Bundesliga
2	Borussia Neunkirchen	8	4	1	3	11	9	+2	9	
3	FC St. Pauli	8	3	2	3	10	14	−4	8	
4	1. FC Nürnberg	8	3	1	4	14	10	+4	7	
5	Wacker 04 Berlin	8	1	0	7	6	20	−14	2	

Source: Fussballdaten.de (in German)
Rules for classification: 1) Points;
(P) Promoted
