= 1985–86 VfL Bochum season =

VfL Bochum
1985–86 season
- President: Ottokar Wüst
- Head Coach: Rolf Schafstall
- Stadium: Ruhrstadion
- Bundesliga: 9th
- DFB-Pokal: Third round
- Top goalscorer: League: Kuntz (22); All: Kuntz (22)
- Highest home attendance: 35,000 (vs FC Schalke 04, 2 November 1985)
- Lowest home attendance: 6,000 (vs Hannover 96, 11 April 1986)
- Average home league attendance: 14,765
Home colours	Away colours	Third colours

The 1985–86 VfL Bochum season was the 48th season in club history.

== Matches ==
=== Legend ===
Win Draw Loss

=== Bundesliga ===
10 August 1985 1	1. FC Nürnberg	0 – 1	VfL Bochum	Nuremberg
15:30			Kree 83'	Stadium: Städtisches Stadion; Attendance: 26,500; Referee: Werner Föckler (Bad Dürkheim)

17 August 1985 2	VfL Bochum	5 – 3	Fortuna Düsseldorf	Bochum
15:30	Kempe 18'; Benatelli 22'; Fischer 35'; Wegmann 50'; Lameck 72' (pen.)		Holmqvist 59' (pen.); Thiele 83', 84'	Stadium: Ruhrstadion; Attendance: 18,000; Referee: Siegfried Brehm (Kemmern)

20 August 1985 3	SV Waldhof Mannheim	4 – 1	VfL Bochum	Ludwigshafen am Rhein
20:00	Klotz 16'; Remark 37', 70'; Bührer 64'		Kuntz 66'	Stadium: Südweststadion; Attendance: 20,000; Referee: Horst-Peter Bruch (Bischmisheim)

31 August 1985 4	VfL Bochum	1 – 2	Bayer 05 Uerdingen	Bochum
15:30	Kuntz 68'		Herget 20'; Bommer 27'	Stadium: Ruhrstadion; Attendance: 15,000; Referee: Rainer Jupe (Traisa)

3 September 1985 5	VfL Bochum	2 – 1	Eintracht Frankfurt	Bochum
20:00	Kuntz 54'; Kempe 83'		Krämer 27'	Stadium: Ruhrstadion; Attendance: 10,000; Referee: Udo Horeis (Hamburg)

6 September 1985 6	1. FC Kaiserslautern	2 – 0	VfL Bochum	Kaiserslautern
20:00	Allofs 2'; Eilenfeldt 57' (pen.)			Stadium: Betzenbergstadion; Attendance: 12,864; Referee: Norbert Brückner (Darmstadt)

14 September 1985 7	VfL Bochum	6 – 1	Borussia Dortmund	Bochum
15:30	U. Wegmann 6'; Kempe 33'; Kuntz 50', 75', 77'; Benatelli 73'		Schüler 17'	Stadium: Ruhrstadion; Attendance: 22,000; Referee: Dieter Pauly (Rheydt)

20 September 1985 8	Bayer 04 Leverkusen	4 – 2	VfL Bochum	Leverkusen
19:30	Cha 8'; Götz 27'; Patzke 44'; Zechel 60'		Kuntz 67'; Leifeld 74'	Stadium: Ulrich-Haberland-Stadion; Attendance: 8,700; Referee: Wolf-Günter Wiesel (Ottbergen)

28 September 1985 9	VfL Bochum	2 – 3	SV Werder Bremen	Bochum
15:30	Kühn 47'; Benatelli 86'		Meier 4'; Neubarth 58'; Sidka 78'	Stadium: Ruhrstadion; Attendance: 23,000; Referee: Anton Matheis (Rodalben)

5 October 1985 10	Borussia Möchengladbach	2 – 0	VfL Bochum	Mönchengladbach
15:30	Mill 58'; Criens 89'			Stadium: Bökelbergstadion; Attendance: 13,500; Referee: Karl-Josef Assenmacher (Fischenich)

11 October 1985 11	VfL Bochum	3 – 0	FC Bayern Munich	Bochum
20:00	Kuntz 10', 60', 90'			Stadium: Ruhrstadion; Attendance: 32,000; Referee: Franz-Josef Hontheim (Trier)

26 October 1985 12	VfB Stuttgart	0 – 4	VfL Bochum	Stuttgart
15:30			Knappheide 55'; Fischer 68', 70'; Kuntz 90'	Stadium: Neckarstadion; Attendance: 17,000; Referee: Gerhard Theobald (Neunkirchen)

2 November 1985 13	VfL Bochum	1 – 1	FC Schalke 04	Bochum
15:30	Kuntz 39'		Dierßen 40'	Stadium: Ruhrstadion; Attendance: 35,000; Referee: Wilfried Heitmann (Drentwede)

9 November 1985 14	Hannover 96	1 – 2	VfL Bochum	Hannover
15:30	Gue 63'		Kuntz 42', 57' (pen.)	Stadium: Niedersachsenstadion; Attendance: 22,000; Referee: Hans Scheuerer (Munich)

19 November 1985 15	VfL Bochum	3 – 1	1. FC Saarbrücken	Bochum
20:00	Lameck 56'; Schulz 69'; Woelk 81'		Seel 34'	Stadium: Ruhrstadion; Attendance: 7,000; Referee: Kurt Witke (Mönchzell)

23 November 1985 16	Hamburger SV	1 – 0	VfL Bochum	Hamburg
15:30	Gründel 88'			Stadium: Volksparkstadion; Attendance: 13,000; Referee: Rainer Boos (Kronberg)

25 March 1986 17	VfL Bochum	2 – 0	1. FC Köln	Bochum
20:00	Wegmann 74'; Kuntz 77' (pen.)			Stadium: Ruhrstadion; Attendance: 9,000; Referee: Dieter Pauly (Rheydt)

7 December 1985 18	VfL Bochum	2 – 1	1. FC Nürnberg	Bochum
15:30	Kree 34'; Kuntz 77'		Grahammer 48' (pen.)	Stadium: Ruhrstadion; Attendance: 10,000; Referee: Hans-Heinrich Barnick (Schenfeld)

14 December 1985 19	Fortuna Düsseldorf	2 – 1	VfL Bochum	Düsseldorf
15:30	Demandt 47'; Weikl 78'		Kuntz 9'	Stadium: Rheinstadion; Attendance: 5,500; Referee: Horst-Peter Bruch (Bischmisheim)

11 March 1986 20	VfL Bochum	0 – 1	SV Waldhof Mannheim	Bochum
20:00			Klotz 39'	Stadium: Ruhrstadion; Attendance: 9,000; Referee: Volker Roth (Salzgitter)

1 February 1986 21	Bayer 05 Uerdingen	3 – 2	VfL Bochum	Krefeld
15:30	Dämgen 11'; Bommer 28'; Eðvaldsson 43'		Fischer 49', 50'	Stadium: Grotenburg-Stadion; Attendance: 10,000; Referee: Hans-Joachim Osmers (Bremen)

8 February 1986 22	Eintracht Frankfurt	1 – 0	VfL Bochum	Frankfurt am Main
15:30	Theiss 52' (pen.)			Stadium: Waldstadion; Attendance: 8,000; Referee: Hans-Heinrich Barnick (Schenfeld)

15 February 1986 23	VfL Bochum	3 – 2	1. FC Kaiserslautern	Bochum
15:30	Fischer 30'; Kühn 38'; Kuntz 77' (pen.)		Allofs 19'; Wuttke 42'	Stadium: Ruhrstadion; Attendance: 10,000; Referee: Peter Correll (Heilbronn)

15 April 1986 24	Borussia Dortmund	1 – 0	VfL Bochum	Dortmund
20:00	Răducanu 39'			Stadium: Westfalenstadion; Attendance: 21,000; Referee: Kurt Witke (Mönchzell)

1 March 1986 25	VfL Bochum	1 – 1	Bayer 04 Leverkusen	Bochum
15:30	Kuntz 52' (pen.)		Schreier 88'	Stadium: Ruhrstadion; Attendance: 9,000; Referee: Hans Scheuerer (Munich)

8 March 1986 26	SV Werder Bremen	0 – 0	VfL Bochum	Bremen
15:30				Stadium: Weserstadion; Attendance: 21,000; Referee: Heinz Werner (Auersmacher)

15 March 1986 27	VfL Bochum	2 – 2	Borussia Mönchengladbach	Bochum
15:30	Kühn 53'; Leifeld 88'		Criens 26'; Rahn 78'	Stadium: Ruhrstadion; Attendance: 20,000; Referee: Joachim Kautschor (Eschweiler)

22 March 1986 28	FC Bayern Munich	6 – 1	VfL Bochum	Munich
15:30	Rummenigge 11'; Lerby 35'; Willmer 54'; Matthäus 66' (pen.); Wohlfarth 67'; Augenthaler 82'		Wielert 72'	Stadium: Olympiastadion; Attendance: 11,000; Referee: Volker Roth (Salzgitter)

29 March 1986 29	VfL Bochum	0 – 2	VfB Stuttgart	Bochum
15:30			Reichert 79'; Wolff 88'	Stadium: Ruhrstadion; Attendance: 8,000; Referee: Werner Föckler (Bad Dürkheim)

5 April 1986 30	FC Schalke 04	4 – 2	VfL Bochum	Gelsenkirchen
15:30	Skibbe 53'; Schipper 62'; Regenbogen 75'; Täuber 81'		Wegmann 28'; Kuntz 80'	Stadium: Parkstadion; Attendance: 16,700; Referee: Wolf-Rüdiger Umbach (Rottdorf)

11 April 1986 31	VfL Bochum	3 – 2	Hannover 96	Bochum
20:00	Kuntz 46' (pen.), 62'; Fischer 49'		Schaub 22', 70'	Stadium: Ruhrstadion; Attendance: 6,000; Referee: Adolf Ermer (Weiden)

19 April 1986 32	1. FC Saarbrücken	0 – 1	VfL Bochum	Saarbrücken
15:30			Fischer 32'	Stadium: Ludwigsparkstadion; Attendance: 4,500; Referee: Norbert Brückner (Darmstadt)

22 April 1986 33	VfL Bochum	2 – 0	Hamburger SV	Bochum
20:00	Benatelli 7'; Kühn 66'			Stadium: Ruhrstadion; Attendance: 8,000; Referee: Rainer Jupe (Traisa)

26 April 1986 34	1. FC Köln	3 – 0	VfL Bochum	Cologne
15:30	Littbarski 34', 81'; Bein 68'			Stadium: Radrennbahn Müngersdorf; Attendance: 18,000; Referee: Manfred Neuner (Leimen)

=== DFB-Pokal ===
24 August 1985 R1	VfL Bochum	3 – 2	Hamburger SV	Bochum
15:30	Kempe 25', 74'; Schulz 64'		Wuttke 58'; Gründel 88'	Stadium: Ruhrstadion; Attendance: 17,000; Referee: Peter Gabor (West Berlin)

19 October 1985 R2	Fortuna Düsseldorf	1 – 1 (a.e.t.)	VfL Bochum	Düsseldorf
15:30	Holmquist 2' (pen.)		Benatelli 30'	Stadium: Rheinstadion; Attendance: 8,500; Referee: Udo Horeis (Hamburg)

30 October 1985 R2 replay	VfL Bochum	2 – 2 (3 – 1 p)	Fortuna Düsseldorf	Bochum
20:00	Tenhagen 2'; Wegmann 55'		Jakobs 35'; Keim 66'	Stadium: Ruhrstadion; Attendance: 15,000; Referee: Hans-Peter Dellwing (Trier)
	Penalties
	Lameck (penalty scored); Woelk (penalty missed); Oswald (penalty scored); Tenhagen (penalty scored)		Keim (penalty missed); Klein (penalty missed); Dusend (penalty missed); Fach (penalty scored)

13 November 1985 R3	VfL Bochum	1 – 1 (a.e.t.)	FC Bayern Munich	Bochum
20:00	Leifeld 62'		Rummenigge 34' (pen.)	Stadium: Ruhrstadion; Attendance: 40.000; Referee: Hans-Joachim Osmers (Bremen)

18 December 1985 R3 replay	FC Bayern Munich	2 – 0	VfL Bochum	Munich
19:30	Wohlfarth 15'; Lerby 38'			Stadium: Olympiastadion; Attendance: 6,500; Referee: Manfred Neuner (Leimen)

== Squad ==
=== Squad and statistics ===
==== Squad, appearances and goals scored ====
No.	Pos	Nat	Player	Total		Bundesliga		DFB-Pokal	
No.	Pos	Nat	Player	Apps	Goals	Apps	Goals	Apps	Goals
	MF	(West Germany) FRG	Frank Benatelli	32	5	27	4	5	1
	MF	(West Germany) FRG	Siegfried Bönighausen	0	0	0	0	0	0
	GK	(West Germany) FRG	Markus Croonen	4	0	4	0	0	0
	GK	(West Germany) FRG	Dirk Drescher (since 10 August 1985)	1	0	1	0	0	0
	FW	(West Germany) FRG	Klaus Fischer	31	8	27	8	4	0
	MF	(West Germany) FRG	Thomas Kempe	35	5	31	3	4	2
	GK	(West Germany) FRG	Wolfgang Kleff (since 13 August 1985)	21	0	20	0	1	0
	MF	(West Germany) FRG	Peter Knäbel	0	0	0	0	0	0
	MF	(West Germany) FRG	Volker Knappheide	8	1	7	1	1	0
	DF	(West Germany) FRG	Heinz Knüwe	18	0	17	0	1	0
	DF	(West Germany) FRG	Martin Kree	38	2	33	2	5	0
	MF	(West Germany) FRG	Michael Kühn	18	4	18	4	0	0
	FW	(West Germany) FRG	Stefan Kuntz	39	22	34	22	5	0
	MF	(West Germany) FRG	Michael Lameck	39	3	34	2	5	1
	FW	(West Germany) FRG	Uwe Leifeld	30	3	26	2	4	1
	MF	(West Germany) FRG	Walter Oswald	36	1	31	0	5	1
	MF	(West Germany) FRG	Toni Schreier	2	0	2	0	0	0
	MF	(West Germany) FRG	Frank Schulz	21	2	17	1	4	1
	DF	(West Germany) FRG	Franz-Josef Tenhagen	29	2	24	0	5	2
	MF	(West Germany) FRG	Uwe Wegmann	37	5	32	4	5	1
	DF	(West Germany) FRG	Jürgen Wielert	18	1	15	1	3	0
	DF	(West Germany) FRG	Lothar Woelk	33	1	29	1	4	0
	DF	(Socialist Federal Republic of Yugoslavia) YUG	Ivan Žugčić	0	0	0	0	0	0
	GK	(West Germany) FRG	Ralf Zumdick	14	0	10	0	4	0

=== Transfers ===
==== Summer ====
In:

No.	Pos.	Nation	Player
—	GK	FRG	Dirk Drescher (from VfL Bochum youth)
—	MF	FRG	Thomas Kempe (from VfB Stuttgart)
—	GK	FRG	Wolfgang Kleff (from Rot-Weiß Oberhausen)
—	FW	FRG	Uwe Leifeld (from SC Preußen Münster)
—	MF	FRG	Uwe Wegmann (from 1. FC Sonthofen)
—	DF	FRG	Jürgen Wielert (from DSC Wanne-Eickel)

Out:

No.	Pos.	Nation	Player
—	DF	FRG	Florian Gothe (to Rot-Weiß Oberhausen)
—	DF	FRG	Thomas Knauer (to SC Preußen Münster)
—	DF	FRG	Ingo Pickenäcker (to Rot-Weiß Oberhausen)
—	DF	FRG	Frank Saborowski (to MSV Duisburg)

== VfL Bochum II ==
No.	Pos	Nat	Player	Total		Oberliga Westfalen	
No.	Pos	Nat	Player	Apps	Goals	Apps	Goals
			Blau	10	5	10	5
	GK	(West Germany) FRG	Stefan Brasas	9	0	9	0
	MF	(West Germany) FRG	Dirk Bremser	31	7	31	7
			Craemer	8	0	8	0
	GK	(West Germany) FRG	Markus Croonen	19	0	19	0
	DF	(West Germany) FRG	Michael Dier	25	2	25	2
	GK	(West Germany) FRG	Dirk Drescher	4	0	4	0
	MF	(West Germany) FRG	Frank Heinemann	29	2	29	2
			Hübenthal	15	1	15	1
	MF	(West Germany) FRG	Peter Knäbel	20	9	20	9
	DF	(West Germany) FRG	Thomas Knauer	32	2	32	2
	MF	(West Germany) FRG	Dieter Kramer	22	1	22	1
			Kühlthau	19	6	19	6
	FW	(West Germany) FRG	Andreas Lübke	1	0	1	0
			Lupa	4	0	4	0
			Musga	4	0	4	0
			Pokriefke	5	0	5	0
			Pott	14	1	14	1
	MF	(West Germany) FRG	Dirk Riechmann	28	2	28	2
			Ruhoff	11	0	11	0
	FW	(West Germany) FRG	Stefan Studtrucker	21	1	21	1
			Vogt	18	2	18	2
			Will	30	10	30	10
			Wüstenfeld	1	0	1	0
	MF	(West Germany) FRG	Klaus Zagorny	28	1	28	1
