= 1988–89 VfL Bochum season =

VfL Bochum
1988–89 season
- President: Ottokar Wüst
- Head Coach: Franz-Josef Tenhagen
- Stadium: Ruhrstadion
- Bundesliga: 15th
- DFB-Pokal: Second Round
- Top goalscorer: League: Leifeld (13); All: Leifeld (15)
- Highest home attendance: 41,000 (vs FC Bayern Munich, 3 December 1988)
- Lowest home attendance: 7,500 (vs Hannover 96, 10 June 1989)
- Average home league attendance: 15,529
Home colours	Away colours

The 1988–89 VfL Bochum season was the 51st season in club history.

== Matches ==
=== Legend ===
Win Draw Loss

=== Bundesliga ===
23 July 1988 1	Stuttgarter Kickers	1–2	VfL Bochum	Stuttgart
15:30	Grabosch 41'		Nehl 36'; Bolzek 89'	Stadium: Neckarstadion; Attendance: 11,500; Referee: Wolf-Günter Wiesel (Ottbergen)

30 July 1988 2	VfL Bochum	0–0	FC St. Pauli	Bochum
15:30				Stadium: Ruhrstadion; Attendance: 12,000; Referee: Siegfried Brehm (Kemmern)

16 August 1988 3	1. FC Köln	1–0	VfL Bochum	Cologne
20:00	Allofs 89' (pen.)			Stadium: Radrennbahn Müngersdorf; Attendance: 18,000; Referee: Dieter Birlenbach (Hattenheim)

20 August 1988 4	VfL Bochum	1–1	Bayer 05 Uerdingen	Bochum
15:30	Kree 73'		Kuntz 42'	Stadium: Ruhrstadion; Attendance: 10,000; Referee: Markus Merk (Otterbach)

27 August 1988 5	1. FC Nürnberg	3–1	VfL Bochum	Nuremberg
15:30	Kuhn 41'; Eckstein 51'; Sané 71'		Kree 88'	Stadium: Städtisches Stadion; Attendance: 15,000; Referee: Wilfred Diekert (Hamburg)

3 September 1988 6	VfL Bochum	2–2	SV Waldhof Mannheim	Bochum
15:30	Leifeld 55', 73'		Freiler 25'; Lux 61'	Stadium: Ruhrstadion; Attendance: 8,000; Referee: Bodo Kriegelstein (West Berlin)

10 September 1988 7	VfL Bochum	1–0	Eintracht Frankfurt	Bochum
15:30	Heinemann 32'			Stadium: Ruhrstadion; Attendance: 9,000; Referee: Manfred Harder (Lüneburg)

13 September 1988 8	Karlsruher SC	1–3	VfL Bochum	Karlsruhe
20:00	Süss 41'		Leifeld 34', 87'; Nehl 83'	Stadium: Wildparkstadion; Attendance: 20,000; Referee: Eugen Strigel (Horb am Neckar)

1 November 1988 9	VfL Bochum	1–0	VfB Stuttgart	Bochum
20:00	Leifeld 39' (pen.)			Stadium: Ruhrstadion; Attendance: 26,000; Referee: Werner Föckler (Bad Dürkheim)

8 October 1988 10	Hamburger SV	3–1	VfL Bochum	Hamburg
15:30	Bein 25'; Bierhoff 54'; Spörl 84'		Kree 57'	Stadium: Volksparkstadion; Attendance: 9,900; Referee: Hans Fux (Stutensee)

22 October 1988 11	VfL Bochum	2–0	1. FC Kaiserslautern	Bochum
15:30	Leifeld 72'; Kree 89'			Stadium: Ruhrstadion; Attendance: 12,000; Referee: Kurt Witke (Mönchzell)

27 October 1988 12	Bayer 04 Leverkusen	1–1	VfL Bochum	Leverkusen
20:00	Kastl 78'		Woelk 54'	Stadium: Ulrich-Haberland-Stadion; Attendance: 11,500; Referee: Anton Matheis (Rodalben)

4 November 1988 13	VfL Bochum	1–2	Borussia Mönchengladbach	Bochum
20:00	Leifeld 20' (pen.)		Criens 22'; Hochstätter 49'	Stadium: Ruhrstadion; Attendance: 32,000; Referee: Rainer Boos (Kronberg)

12 November 1988 14	SV Werder Bremen	2–0	VfL Bochum	Bremen
15:30	Ordenewitz 63', 77' (pen.)			Stadium: Weserstadion; Attendance: 14,100; Referee: Manfred Neuner (Leimen)

19 November 1988 15	VfL Bochum	2–2	Borussia Dortmund	Bochum
15:30	Kree 69'; Bolzek 88'		Möller 28'; Rummenigge 64'	Stadium: Ruhrstadion; Attendance: 32,000; Referee: Hans Scheuerer (Munich)

26 November 1988 16	Hannover 96	3–2	VfL Bochum	Hannover
15:30	Kohn 23'; Dammeier 57'; Grillemeier 83'		Leifeld 4', 61'	Stadium: Niedersachsenstadion; Attendance: 7,500; Referee: Karl-Heinz Tritschler (Freiburg)

3 December 1988 17	VfL Bochum	0–0	FC Bayern Munich	Bochum
15:30				Stadium: Ruhrstadion; Attendance: 41,000; Referee: Wolfgang Mierswa (Hennigsen)

21 March 1989 18	VfL Bochum	2–1	Stuttgarter Kickers	Bochum
20:00	Kree 40', 71'		Hotić 90'	Stadium: Ruhrstadion; Attendance: 8,000; Referee: Wolf-Rüdiger Umbach (Rottdorf)

25 February 1989 19	FC St. Pauli	1–0	VfL Bochum	Hamburg
15:30	Zander 56'			Stadium: Wilhelm-Koch-Stadion; Attendance: 17,300; Referee: Kurt Witke (Mönchzell)

4 March 1989 20	VfL Bochum	1–3	1. FC Köln	Bochum
15:30	Kree 29'		Kree 54' (o.g.); Allofs 62'; Olsen 86'	Stadium: Ruhrstadion; Attendance: 16,000; Referee: Hans Fux (Stutensee)

11 March 1989 21	Bayer 05 Uerdingen	3–1	VfL Bochum	Krefeld
15:30	W. Funkel 10'; Bartram 62'; Fach 64'		Leifeld 81'	Stadium: Grotenburg-Stadion; Attendance: 8,700; Referee: Siegfried Brehm (Kemmern)

18 March 1989 22	VfL Bochum	1–0	1. FC Nürnberg	Bochum
15:30	Kree 67' (pen.)			Stadium: Ruhrstadion; Attendance: 10,000; Referee: Gerd Zimmermann (Kiel)

25 March 1989 23	SV Waldhof Mannheim	2–2	VfL Bochum	Ludwigshafen
15:30	Dais 43'; Bockenfeld 57'		Kempe 25'; Reekers 27'	Stadium: Südweststadion; Attendance: 8,905; Referee: Manfred Amerell (Munich)

31 March 1989 24	Eintracht Frankfurt	1–1	VfL Bochum	Frankfurt am Main
20:00	Binz 81'		Nehl 58'	Stadium: Waldstadion; Attendance: 10,000; Referee: Werner Föckler (Bad Dürkheim)

8 April 1989 25	VfL Bochum	2–0	Karlsruher SC	Bochum
15:30	Leifeld 34' (pen.), 85'			Stadium: Ruhrstadion; Attendance: 10,500; Referee: Hans-Joachim Osmers (Bremen)

14 April 1989 26	VfB Stuttgart	3–1	VfL Bochum	Stuttgart
20:00	Gaudino 14'; Klinsmann 39', 90'		Kree 80'	Stadium: Neckarstadion; Attendance: 11,200; Referee: Kurt Röthlisberger (Suhr)

29 April 1989 27	VfL Bochum	2–1	Hamburger SV	Bochum
15:30	Kree 34' (pen.); Leifeld 90'		Moser 12'	Stadium: Ruhrstadion; Attendance: 14,000; Referee: Aron Schmidhuber (Ottobrunn)

5 May 1989 28	1. FC Kaiserslautern	3–0	VfL Bochum	Kaiserslautern
20:00	Kohr 27'; Sommer 35'; Labbadia 90'			Stadium: Fritz-Walter-Stadion; Attendance: 23,324; Referee: Wilfried Heitmann (Drentwede)

16 May 1989 29	VfL Bochum	2–4	Bayer 04 Leverkusen	Bochum
20:00	Hubner 81', 89'		Waas 19', 20'; Feinbier 41'; Rolff 79' (pen.)	Stadium: Ruhrstadion; Attendance: 8,000; Referee: Rainer Boos (Kronberg)

20 May 1989 30	Borussia Mönchengladbach	2–0	VfL Bochum	Mönchengladbach
15:30	Bruns 3'; Winter 32'			Stadium: Bökelbergstadion; Attendance: 8,000; Referee: Edgar Steinborn (Sinzig)

25 May 1989 31	VfL Bochum	0–1	SV Werder Bremen	Bochum
20:00			Riedle 13'	Stadium: Ruhrstadion; Attendance: 8,000; Referee: Markus Merk (Otterbach)

3 June 1989 32	Borussia Dortmund	2–1	VfL Bochum	Dortmund
15:30	Möller 4'; Oswald 34' (o.g.)		Riechmann 54'	Stadium: Westfalenstadion; Attendance: 25,398; Referee: Karl-Josef Assenmacher (Fischenich)

10 June 1989 33	VfL Bochum	1–3	Hannover 96	Bochum
15:30	Kree 89' (pen.)		Reich 23', 75'; Kohn 57'	Stadium: Ruhrstadion; Attendance: 7,500; Referee: Hans Scheuerer (Munich)

17 June 1989 34	FC Bayern Munich	5–0	VfL Bochum	Munich
15:30	Wohlfarth 5', 14', 69', 76' (pen.); Thon 72'			Stadium: Olympiastadion; Attendance: 68,000; Referee: Manfred Neuner (Leimen)

=== DFB-Pokal ===
6 August 1988 R1	Arminia Bielefeld	0–0 (a.e.t.)	VfL Bochum	Bielefeld
				Stadium: Alm; Attendance: 5,500; Referee: Joachim Ren (Salzgitter)

7 September 1988 R1 replay	VfL Bochum	4–1 (a.e.t.)	Arminia Bielefeld	Bochum
	Legat 90' (pen.); Leifeld 91'; Bolzek 111'; Heinemann 118'		Oswald 6' (o.g.)	Stadium: Ruhrstadion; Attendance: 4,000; Referee: Klaus Plettenberg (Essen)

29 November 1988 R2	VfB Stuttgart	3–2 (a.e.t.)	VfL Bochum	Stuttgart
	Schmäler 78'; Allgöwer 90'; Klinsmann 117'		Leifeld 7'; Nehl 62'	Stadium: Neckarstadion; Attendance: 8,500; Referee: Bodo Kriegelstein (West Berlin)

== Squad ==
=== Squad and statistics ===
==== Squad, appearances and goals scored ====
No.	Pos	Nat	Player	Total		Bundesliga		DFB-Pokal	
No.	Pos	Nat	Player	Apps	Goals	Apps	Goals	Apps	Goals
	MF	(West Germany) FRG	Frank Benatelli	32	0	30	0	2	0
	FW	(West Germany) FRG	Thorsten Bolzek	24	3	22	2	2	1
	MF	(West Germany) FRG	Dirk Bremser	0	0	0	0	0	0
	DF	(West Germany) FRG	Olaf Dreßel	2	0	1	0	1	0
	FW	(West Germany) FRG	Thomas Epp	14	0	13	0	1	0
	DF	(West Germany) FRG	Jürgen Gredig	4	0	3	0	1	0
	MF	(West Germany) FRG	Frank Heinemann	29	2	26	1	3	1
	MF	(West Germany) FRG	Michael Hubner	11	2	10	2	1	0
	MF	(Poland) POL	Andrzej Iwan	16	0	14	0	2	0
	DF	(West Germany) FRG	Peter Jackisch	8	0	8	0	0	0
	DF	(West Germany) FRG	Thomas Kempe	28	1	25	1	3	0
	DF	(West Germany) FRG	Martin Kree	36	12	33	12	3	0
	MF	(West Germany) FRG	Thorsten Legat	27	1	24	0	3	1
	FW	(West Germany) FRG	Uwe Leifeld	37	15	34	13	3	2
	FW	(West Germany) FRG	Josef Nehl	29	4	27	3	2	1
	DF	(West Germany) FRG	Walter Oswald	27	0	24	0	3	0
	DF	(Netherlands) NED	Rob Reekers	31	1	30	1	1	0
	MF	(West Germany) FRG	Dirk Riechmann	3	1	3	1	0	0
	MF	(West Germany) FRG	Michael Rzehaczek	29	0	27	0	2	0
	MF	(West Germany) FRG	Dirk Sadowicz (since 16 May 1989)	1	0	1	0	0	0
	MF	(West Germany) FRG	Martin Slawinski	0	0	0	0	0	0
	GK	(West Germany) FRG	Andreas Wessels	7	0	6	0	1	0
	DF	(West Germany) FRG	Oliver Westerbeek	16	0	15	0	1	0
	DF	(West Germany) FRG	Lothar Woelk	33	1	31	1	2	0
	GK	(West Germany) FRG	Ralf Zumdick	31	0	29	0	2	0

=== Transfers ===
==== Summer ====
In:

No.	Pos.	Nation	Player
—	FW	FRG	Thorsten Bolzek (from 1. Traber FC)
—	DF	FRG	Jürgen Gredig (from Hertha Zehlendorf)
—	MF	FRG	Martin Slawinski (from Hammer SpVg)
—	DF	FRG	Oliver Westerbeek (from FC 08 Homburg)

Out:

No.	Pos.	Nation	Player
—	MF	FRG	Peter Knäbel (to FC St. Pauli)
—	MF	FRG	Volker Knappheide (to Schwarz-Weiß Essen)
—	MF	FRG	Michael Lameck (to TuS Paderborn-Neuhaus)
—	FW	FRG	Andreas Lübke (to VfB Rheine)
—	MF	FRG	Detlef Mikolajczak (to DSC Wanne-Eickel)

==== Winter ====
In:

No.	Pos.	Nation	Player
—	MF	FRG	Dirk Sadowicz (from VfL Bochum II)

Out:

No.	Pos.	Nation	Player
