= 1986–87 VfL Bochum season =

VfL Bochum
1986–87 season
- President: Ottokar Wüst
- Head Coach: Hermann Gerland
- Stadium: Ruhrstadion
- Bundesliga: 11th
- DFB-Pokal: First Round
- Top goalscorer: League: Schulz (11); All: Schulz (11)
- Highest home attendance: 36,000 (vs Borussia Dortmund, 28 November 1986)
- Lowest home attendance: 7,000 (vs Bayer 05 Uerdingen, 23 May 1987)
- Average home league attendance: 17,941
Home colours	Away colours	Third colours

The 1986–87 VfL Bochum season was the 49th season in club history.

== Matches ==
=== Legend ===
Win Draw Loss

=== Bundesliga ===
9 August 1986 1	VfL Bochum	3–1	1. FC Köln	Bochum
15:30	Leifeld 9', 67'; Woelk 47'		Allofs 24'	Stadium: Ruhrstadion; Attendance: 23000; Referee: Siegfried Brehm (Kemmern)

16 August 1986 2	1. FC Nürnberg	3–3	VfL Bochum	Nuremberg
15:30	Eckstein 16'; Grahammer 31' (pen.), 43' (pen.)		Leifeld 27'; Kree 55'; Schulz 58'	Stadium: Städtisches Stadion; Attendance: 25,500; Referee: Gerd Zimmermann (Kiel)

23 August 1986 3	VfL Bochum	1–1	Hamburger SV	Bochum
15:30	Oswald 49'		Okoński 8'	Stadium: Ruhrstadion; Attendance: 30,000; Referee: Hans Scheuerer (Munich)

3 September 1986 4	1. FC Kaiserslautern	4–1	VfL Bochum	Kaiserslautern
20:00	Allievi 44'; Wuttke 50' (pen.), 88'; Moser 62'		Schulz 9'	Stadium: Betzenbergstadion; Attendance: 17,000; Referee: Norbert Brückner (Darmstadt)

6 September 1986 5	VfL Bochum	1–1	Borussia Mönchengladbach	Bochum
15:30	Lameck 35' (pen.)		Thiele 65'	Stadium: Ruhrstadion; Attendance: 18,000; Referee: Wolf-Günter Wiesel (Ottbergen)

12 September 1986 6	SV Werder Bremen	0–0	VfL Bochum	Bremen
20:00				Stadium: Weserstadion; Attendance: 22,800; Referee: Hans-Peter Schäfer (Rohrhof)

20 September 1986 7	Blau-Weiß 90 Berlin	0–0	VfL Bochum	West Berlin
15:30				Stadium: Olympiastadion; Attendance: 16,988; Referee: Rainer Boos (Kronberg)

27 September 1986 8	VfL Bochum	2–0	Eintracht Frankfurt	Bochum
15:30	Kree 73'; Woelk 79'			Stadium: Ruhrstadion; Attendance: 14,000; Referee: Wilfried Heitmann (Drentwede)

4 October 1986 9	FC Bayern Munich	3–2	VfL Bochum	Munich
15:30	Rummenigge 23'; Pflügler 24'; Wohlfarth 60'		Lameck 44' (pen.); Schulz 87'	Stadium: Olympiastadion; Attendance: 40,000; Referee: Bodo Kriegelstein (West Berlin)

11 October 1986 10	VfL Bochum	2–1	Bayer 04 Leverkusen	Bochum
15:30	Woelk 17'; Leifeld 33'		Schreier 46' (pen.)	Stadium: Ruhrstadion; Attendance: 18,000; Referee: Anton Matheis (Rodalben)

18 October 1986 11	SV Waldhof Mannheim	0–0	VfL Bochum	Ludwigshafen am Rhein
15:30				Stadium: Südweststadion; Attendance: 8,000; Referee: Hans-Peter Dellwing (Trier)

1 November 1986 12	VfL Bochum	0–0	FC 08 Homburg	Bochum
18:00				Stadium: Ruhrstadion; Attendance: 10,000; Referee: Karl-Heinz Tritschler (Freiburg)

8 November 1986 13	Bayer 05 Uerdingen	3–1	VfL Bochum	Krefeld
15:30	Klinger 34'; Kuntz 72'; Witeczek 90'		Schulz 55'	Stadium: Grotenburg-Stadion; Attendance: 8,500; Referee: Horst-Peter Bruch (Bischmisheim)

15 November 1986 14	VfL Bochum	0–1	VfB Stuttgart	Bochum
15:30			Klinsmann 82'	Stadium: Ruhrstadion; Attendance: 15,000; Referee: Wolfgang Mierswa (Hennigsen)

22 November 1986 15	FC Schalke 04	0–0	VfL Bochum	Gelsenkirchen
15:30				Stadium: Parkstadion; Attendance: 16,400; Referee: Wolf-Dieter Ahlenfelder (Oberhausen)

28 November 1986 16	VfL Bochum	0–0	Borussia Dortmund	Bochum
20:00				Stadium: Ruhrstadion; Attendance: 36,000; Referee: Kurt Witke (Mönchzell)

6 December 1986 17	Fortuna Düsseldorf	0–4	VfL Bochum	Düsseldorf
15:30			Woelk 18'; Wegmann 53'; Benatelli 80'; Schulz 90'	Stadium: Rheinstadion; Attendance: 8,000; Referee: Werner Föckler (Bad Dürkheim)

21 February 1987 18	1. FC Köln	1–0	VfL Bochum	Cologne
15:30	Geils 35'			Stadium: Radrennbahn Müngersdorf; Attendance: 6,000; Referee: Hans-Jürgen Weber (Bielefeld)

28 February 1987 19	VfL Bochum	0–1	1. FC Nürnberg	Bochum
15:30			Brunner 88'	Stadium: Ruhrstadion; Attendance: 11,000; Referee: Heinz Werner (Auersmacher)

14 March 1987 20	Hamburger SV	1–1	VfL Bochum	Hamburg
15:30	Kastl 47'		Lübke 54'	Stadium: Volksparkstadion; Attendance: 12,000; Referee: Rainer Jupe (Traisa)

21 March 1987 21	VfL Bochum	3–1	1. FC Kaiserslautern	Bochum
15:30	Knäbel 6'; Woelk 48' (pen.); Fischer 62'		Kohr 28'	Stadium: Ruhrstadion; Attendance: 18,000; Referee: Hans-Heinrich Barnick (Schenfeld)

28 March 1987 22	Borussia Mönchengladbach	2–1	VfL Bochum	Mönchengladbach
15:30	Criens 17'; Hochstätter 34'		Knäbel 45'	Stadium: Bökelbergstadion; Attendance: 12,000; Referee: Manfred Amerell (Munich)

4 April 1987 23	VfL Bochum	1–1	SV Werder Bremen	Bochum
15:30	Kempe 61'		Völler 53'	Stadium: Ruhrstadion; Attendance: 18,000; Referee: Siegfried Brehm (Kemmern)

10 April 1987 24	VfL Bochum	5–1	Blau-Weiß 90 Berlin	Bochum
20:00	Woelk 33'; Kree 58'; Oswald 67'; Nehl 84' (pen.), 86'		Riedle 63'	Stadium: Ruhrstadion; Attendance: 10,000; Referee: Gerhard Theobald (Neunkirchen)

15 April 1987 25	Eintracht Frankfurt	1–1	VfL Bochum	Frankfurt am Main
20:00	Müller 40'		Lameck 90'	Stadium: Waldstadion; Attendance: 10,000; Referee: Horst-Peter Bruch (Bischmisheim)

25 April 1987 26	VfL Bochum	1–2	FC Bayern Munich	Bochum
15:30	Leifeld 15'		Brehme 17'; Matthäus 62'	Stadium: Ruhrstadion; Attendance: 35,000; Referee: Hans-Joachim Osmers (Bremen)

2 May 1987 27	Bayer 04 Leverkusen	2–1	VfL Bochum	Leverkusen
15:30	Cha 60'; Drews 68'		Fischer 57'	Stadium: Ulrich-Haberland-Stadion; Attendance: 7,500; Referee: Hans Puchalski (Duisburg)

9 May 1987 28	VfL Bochum	6–1	SV Waldhof Mannheim	Bochum
15:30	Wegmann 9', 66'; Schulz 46', 61', 64'; Leifeld 84'		Klotz 5'	Stadium: Ruhrstadion; Attendance: 8,000; Referee: Helmut Reinstädtler (Neuweiler)

16 May 1987 29	FC 08 Homburg	3–1	VfL Bochum	Homburg
15:30	Freiler 55'; Knoll 79'; Müller 85'		Kempe 60'	Stadium: Waldstadion; Attendance: 5,000; Referee: Hans Scheuerer (Munich)

23 May 1987 30	VfL Bochum	2–1	Bayer 05 Uerdingen	Bochum
15:30	Kree 15'; Leifeld 35'		Bommer 44'	Stadium: Ruhrstadion; Attendance: 7,000; Referee: Bodo Kriegelstein (West Berlin)

29 May 1987 31	VfB Stuttgart	2–4	VfL Bochum	Stuttgart
20:00	Allgöwer 26' (pen.); Schmitt 32'		Nehl 17'; Müller 31' (o.g.); Wegmann 68'; Schulz 88' (pen.)	Stadium: Neckarstadion; Attendance: 10,000; Referee: Peter Gabor (West Berlin)

5 June 1987 32	VfL Bochum	1–1	FC Schalke 04	Bochum
20:00	Schulz 83'		Thon 67'	Stadium: Ruhrstadion; Attendance: 22,000; Referee: Hans-Jürgen Weber (Bielefeld)

13 June 1987 33	Borussia Dortmund	3–2	VfL Bochum	Dortmund
15:30	Mill 11', 74'; Banach 76'		Schulz 32'; Leifeld 59'	Stadium: Westfalenstadion; Attendance: 34,000; Referee: Wolf-Dieter Ahlenfelder (Oberhausen)

17 June 1987 34	VfL Bochum	2–2	Fortuna Düsseldorf	Bochum
15:30	Wegmann 62'; Fischer 72'		Bockenfeld 51'; Weikl 89' (pen.)	Stadium: Ruhrstadion; Attendance: 12,000; Referee: Joachim Kautschor (Eschweiler)

=== DFB-Pokal ===
30 August 1986 R1	VfL Bochum	1–2	FC St. Pauli	Bochum
15:30	Leifeld 70'		Golke 43'; Wenzel 73'	Stadium: Ruhrstadion; Attendance: 4,000; Referee: Kurt Witke (Mönchzell)

== Squad ==
=== Squad and statistics ===
==== Squad, appearances and goals scored ====
No.	Pos	Nat	Player	Total		Bundesliga		DFB-Pokal	
No.	Pos	Nat	Player	Apps	Goals	Apps	Goals	Apps	Goals
	MF	(West Germany) FRG	Frank Benatelli	30	1	30	1	0	0
	DF	(West Germany) FRG	Siegfried Bönighausen	0	0	0	0	0	0
	MF	(West Germany) FRG	Dirk Bremser	0	0	0	0	0	0
	FW	(West Germany) FRG	Rudolf Decker	0	0	0	0	0	0
	FW	(West Germany) FRG	Klaus Fischer	11	3	11	3	0	0
	MF	(West Germany) FRG	Frank Heinemann	14	0	14	0	0	0
	DF	(West Germany) FRG	Thomas Kempe	33	2	32	2	1	0
	MF	(West Germany) FRG	Peter Knäbel	17	2	17	2	0	0
	MF	(West Germany) FRG	Volker Knappheide	0	0	0	0	0	0
	DF	(West Germany) FRG	Martin Kree	33	4	32	4	1	0
	MF	(West Germany) FRG	Michael Kühn	6	0	6	0	0	0
	MF	(West Germany) FRG	Michael Lameck	35	3	34	3	1	0
	MF	(West Germany) FRG	Thorsten Legat	7	0	7	0	0	0
	FW	(West Germany) FRG	Uwe Leifeld	24	9	23	8	1	1
	FW	(West Germany) FRG	Andreas Lübke	7	1	7	1	0	0
	FW	(Denmark) DEN	Ole Møller Nielsen (28 November 1986 until 7 December 1986)	2	0	2	0	0	0
	FW	(West Germany) FRG	Josef Nehl	33	3	32	3	1	0
	DF	(West Germany) FRG	Walter Oswald	26	2	25	2	1	0
	DF	(Netherlands) NED	Rob Reekers	29	0	28	0	1	0
	FW	(West Germany) FRG	Franz Schick	5	0	4	0	1	0
	MF	(West Germany) FRG	Frank Schulz	32	11	31	11	1	0
	DF	(West Germany) FRG	Franz-Josef Tenhagen	0	0	0	0	0	0
	MF	(West Germany) FRG	Uwe Wegmann	25	5	24	5	1	0
	GK	(West Germany) FRG	Andreas Wessels	0	0	0	0	0	0
	DF	(West Germany) FRG	Jürgen Wielert	3	0	3	0	0	0
	DF	(West Germany) FRG	Lothar Woelk	33	6	32	6	1	0
	DF	(Socialist Federal Republic of Yugoslavia) YUG	Ivan Žugčić	13	0	13	0	0	0
	GK	(West Germany) FRG	Ralf Zumdick	35	0	34	0	1	0

=== Transfers ===
==== Summer ====
In:

No.	Pos.	Nation	Player
—	MF	FRG	Dirk Bremser (from VfL Bochum II)
—	FW	FRG	Rudolf Decker (from MSV Duisburg)
—	MF	FRG	Frank Heinemann (from VfL Bochum II)
—	MF	FRG	Thorsten Legat (from VfL Bochum II)
—	FW	DEN	Ole Møller Nielsen (from Vejle Boldklub)
—	FW	FRG	Josef Nehl (from Viktoria Köln)
—	DF	NED	Rob Reekers (from ASC Schöppingen)
—	FW	FRG	Franz Schick (from TSV Ampfing)
—	GK	FRG	Andreas Wessels (from Viktoria Goch)

Out:

No.	Pos.	Nation	Player
—	GK	FRG	Markus Croonen (to SC Preußen Münster)
—	GK	FRG	Wolfgang Kleff (to FSV Salmrohr)
—	DF	FRG	Heinz Knüwe (to Hannover 96)
—	FW	FRG	Stefan Kuntz (to Bayer 05 Uerdingen)
—	MF	FRG	Toni Schreier (to SpVgg Erkenschwick)

==== Winter ====
In:

No.	Pos.	Nation	Player

Out:

No.	Pos.	Nation	Player
—	FW	DEN	Ole Møller Nielsen (to Vejle Boldklub)
