= 1984–85 VfL Bochum season =

VfL Bochum
1984–85 season
- President: Ottokar Wüst
- Head Coach: Rolf Schafstall
- Stadium: Ruhrstadion
- Bundesliga: 9th
- DFB-Pokal: Second Round
- Top goalscorer: League: Fischer (16); All: Fischer (16)
- Highest home attendance: 42,000 (vs FC Bayern Munich, 11 May 1985)
- Lowest home attendance: 8,000 (vs Fortuna Düsseldorf, 8 June 1985)
- Average home league attendance: 23,000
Home colours	Away colours

The 1984–85 VfL Bochum season was the 47th season in club history.

== Matches ==
=== Legend ===
Win Draw Loss

=== Bundesliga ===
24 August 1984 1	VfL Bochum	3 – 3	Eintracht Frankfurt	Bochum
20:00	Fischer 1', 63'; Schulz 48'		Trieb 22', 29'; Kraaz 72'	Stadium: Ruhrstadion; Attendance: 22,000; Referee: Heinz Werner (Auersmacher)

29 August 1984 2	FC Schalke 04	2 – 3	VfL Bochum	Gelsenkirchen
20:00	Dierßen 44'; Täuber 46'		Schulz 47'; Fischer 66'; Kuntz 81'	Stadium: Parkstadion; Attendance: 40,700; Referee: Rüdiger Wuttke (Oberhausen)

8 September 1984 3	VfL Bochum	0 – 0	Hamburger SV	Bochum
15:30				Stadium: Ruhrstadion; Attendance: 30,000; Referee: Norbert Brückner (Darmstadt)

15 September 1984 4	Borussia Mönchengladbach	4 – 3	VfL Bochum	Mönchengladbach
15:30	Rahn 2' (51); Bruns 43' (pen.); Mill 54'		Fischer 60', 71'; Knäbel 90'	Stadium: Bökelbergstadion; Attendance: 15,000; Referee: Robert Walz (Waiblingen)

21 September 1984 5	Borussia Dortmund	3 – 0	VfL Bochum	Dortmund
20:00	Wegmann 79', 90'; Răducanu 85' (pen.)			Stadium: Westfalenstadion; Attendance: 30,000; Referee: Siegfried Brehm (Kemmern)

29 September 1984 6	VfL Bochum	0 – 0	Bayer 04 Leverkusen	Bochum
15:30				Stadium: Ruhrstadion; Attendance: 18,000; Referee: Peter Correll (Heilbronn)

5 October 1984 7	Karlsruher SC	1 – 1	VfL Bochum	Karlsruhe
20:00	Künast 56'		Fischer 20'	Stadium: Wildparkstadion; Attendance: 18,000; Referee: Wolf-Rüdiger Umbach (Rottdorf)

23 October 1984 8	VfL Bochum	3 – 0	1. FC Kaiserslautern	Bochum
20:00	Kuntz 22'; Fischer 76', 84'			Stadium: Ruhrstadion; Attendance: 18,000; Referee: Peter Gabor (West Berlin)

19 October 1984 9	Eintracht Braunschweig	1 – 3	VfL Bochum	Braunschweig
20:00	Geiger 27'		Fischer 36'; Kuntz 48'; Tenhagen 81'	Stadium: Eintracht-Stadion; Attendance: 11,000; Referee: Hans Scheuerer (Munich)

26 October 1984 10	VfL Bochum	1 – 1	Arminia Bielefeld	Bochum
20:00	Kuntz 56' (pen.)		Reich 54'	Stadium: Ruhrstadion; Attendance: 25,000; Referee: Karl-Josef Assenmacher (Fischenich)

2 November 1984 11	SV Werder Bremen	2 – 2	VfL Bochum	Bremen
20:00	Völler 28'; Schaaf 65'		Knüwe 52'; Schreier 80'	Stadium: Weserstadion; Attendance: 24,000; Referee: Manfred Neuner (Leimen)

9 November 1984 12	VfL Bochum	1 – 0	Bayer 05 Uerdingen	Bochum
20:00	Schulz 64'			Stadium: Ruhrstadion; Attendance: 28,000; Referee: Wolf-Günter Wiesel (Ottbergen)

14 November 1984 13	FC Bayern Munich	2 – 2	VfL Bochum	Munich
20:00	Grobe 15'; Mathy 18'		Oswald 6'; Kuntz 24' (pen.)	Stadium: Olympiastadion; Attendance: 20,000; Referee: Gerd Zimmermann (Kiel)

17 November 1984 14	VfL Bochum	1 – 3	1. FC Köln	Bochum
15:30	Kree 74'		Littbarski 3', 88'; Engels 75'	Stadium: Ruhrstadion; Attendance: 35,000; Referee: Adolf Ermer (Weiden)

24 November 1984 15	VfB Stuttgart	1 – 2	VfL Bochum	Stuttgart
15:30	Reichert 18'		Schulz 24', 44'	Stadium: Neckarstadion; Attendance: 17,400; Referee: Wilfried Heitmann (Drentwede)

30 November 1984 16	VfL Bochum	0 – 1	Waldhof Mannheim	Bochum
20:00			Bührer 56'	Stadium: Ruhrstadion; Attendance: 21,000; Referee: Udo Horeis (Hamburg)

8 December 1984 17	Fortuna Düsseldorf	0 – 2	VfL Bochum	Düsseldorf
15:30			Kuntz 16'; Schulz 18'	Stadium: Rheinstadion; Attendance: 13,500; Referee: Werner Föckler (Bad Dürkheim)

2 February 1985 18	Eintracht Frankfurt	1 – 1	VfL Bochum	Frankfurt am Main
15:30	Sievers 38'		Fischer 33'	Stadium: Waldstadion; Attendance: 16,000; Referee: Volker Roth (Salzgitter)

16 February 1985 19	VfL Bochum	0 – 1	FC Schalke 04	Bochum
15:30			Täuber 26'	Stadium: Ruhrstadion; Attendance: 36,000; Referee: Wolf-Rüdiger Umbach (Rottdorf)

9 April 1985 20	Hamburger SV	3 – 1	VfL Bochum	Hamburg
20:00	Wehmeyer 8'; Milewski 43', 83'		Schulz 74'	Stadium: Volksparkstadion; Attendance: 15,700; Referee: Hans-Peter Dellwing (Trier)

5 March 1985 21	VfL Bochum	0 – 2	Borussia Mönchengladbach	Bochum
20:00			Hochstätter 74'; Dreßen 89'	Stadium: Ruhrstadion; Attendance: 25,000; Referee: Hans-Heinrich Barnick (Schenfeld)

9 March 1985 22	VfL Bochum	4 – 1	Borussia Dortmund	Bochum
15:30	Fischer 63'; Kuntz 77', 90'; Schulz 82'		Zorc 85' (pen.)	Stadium: Ruhrstadion; Attendance: 20,000; Referee: Wolf-Dieter Ahlenfelder (Oberhausen)

16 March 1985 23	Bayer 04 Leverkusen	1 – 1	VfL Bochum	Leverkusen
15:30	Cha 32'		Fischer 4'	Stadium: Ulrich-Haberland-Stadion; Attendance: 7,000; Referee: Dieter Pauly (Rheydt)

22 March 1985 24	VfL Bochum	5 – 2	Karlsruher SC	Bochum
20:00	Kree 12'; Fischer 53'; Knüwe 55'; Kuntz 57'; Benatelli 59'		Groß 26'; Keim 31'	Stadium: Ruhrstadion; Attendance: 15,000; Referee: Heinz Werner (Auersmacher)

21 May 1985 25	1. FC Kaiserslautern	5 – 2	VfL Bochum	Kaiserslautern
20:00	Moser 21'; Hübner 63'; Melzer 66'; Schupp 68'; Allofs 71'		Fischer 78'; Kuntz 82'	Stadium: Betzenbergstadion; Attendance: 9,587; Referee: Karl-Heinz Tritschler (Freiburg)

3 April 1985 26	VfL Bochum	1 – 0	Eintracht Braunschweig	Bochum
20:00	Schulz 88'			Stadium: Ruhrstadion; Attendance: 10,000; Referee: Gerhard Theobald (Neunkirchen)

13 April 1985 27	Arminia Bielefeld	2 – 3	VfL Bochum	Bielefeld
15:30	Rautiainen 22'; Foda 74'		Woelk 12'; Benatelli 43'; Fischer 50'	Stadium: Alm; Attendance: 8,000; Referee: Rüdiger Wuttke (Oberhausen)

20 April 1985 28	VfL Bochum	1 – 3	SV Werder Bremen	Bochum
15:30	Benatelli 3'		Oswald 24' (o.g.); Völler 37'; Möhlmann 78'	Stadium: Ruhrstadion; Attendance: 28,000; Referee: Siegfried Brehm (Kemmern)

3 May 1985 29	Bayer 05 Uerdingen	3 – 1	VfL Bochum	Krefeld
20:00	F. Funkel 18' (pen.); W. Funkel 53' (pen.); Raschid 80'		Fischer 41'	Stadium: Grotenburg-Stadion; Attendance: 11,000; Referee: Norbert Brückner (Darmstadt)

11 May 1985 30	VfL Bochum	1 – 1	FC Bayern Munich	Bochum
15:30	Benatelli 70'		Matthäus 28'	Stadium: Ruhrstadion; Attendance: 42,000; Referee: Franz-Josef Hontheim (Trier)

17 May 1985 31	1. FC Köln	2 – 1	VfL Bochum	Cologne
20:00	Lehnhoff 25'; Engels 71'		Kuntz 43'	Stadium: Radrennbahn Müngersdorf; Attendance: 12,000; Referee: Dieter Pauly (Rheydt)

25 May 1985 32	VfL Bochum	2 – 1	VfB Stuttgart	Bochum
15:30	Schulz 9'; Förster 61' (o.g.)		Claesen 48'	Stadium: Ruhrstadion; Attendance: 10,000; Referee: Volker Roth (Salzgitter)

1 June 1985 33	SV Waldhof Mannheim	2 – 0	VfL Bochum	Ludwigshafen am Rhein
15:30	Rombach 12'; Walter 90'			Stadium: Südweststadion; Attendance: 11,500; Referee: Aron Schmidhuber (Ottobrunn)

8 June 1985 34	VfL Bochum	1 – 0	Fortuna Düsseldorf	Bochum
15:30	Schulz 34'			Stadium: Ruhrstadion; Attendance: 8,000; Referee: Manfred Neuner (Leimen)

=== DFB-Pokal ===
1 September 1984 R1	TSV Havelse	2 – 2 (a.e.t.)	VfL Bochum	Garbsen
	Stoffregen 70' (pen.); Zerr 113'		Woelk 26'; Schreier 96'	Stadium: Willhelm-Langrehr-Stadion; Attendance: 2,500; Referee: Uwe Kasperowski (West Berlin)

25 September 1984 R1 replay	VfL Bochum	4 – 0	TSV Havelse	Bochum
	Lameck 4'; Kuntz 25', 36' (pen.), 48'			Stadium: Ruhrstadion; Attendance: 2,000; Referee: Hans Puchalski (Duisburg)

21 November 1984 R2	Alemannia Aachen	3 – 0	VfL Bochum	Aachen
	Habig 56'; Thomas 66'; Willkomm 78'			Stadium: Tivoli; Attendance: 24,000; Referee: Anton Matheis (Rodalben)

== Squad ==
=== Squad and statistics ===
==== Squad, appearances and goals scored ====
No.	Pos	Nat	Player	Total		Bundesliga		DFB-Pokal	
No.	Pos	Nat	Player	Apps	Goals	Apps	Goals	Apps	Goals
	FW	(West Germany) FRG	Frank Benatelli	15	4	15	4	0	0
	MF	(West Germany) FRG	Siegfried Bönighausen	17	0	16	0	1	0
	GK	(West Germany) FRG	Markus Croonen	1	0	0	0	1	0
	FW	(West Germany) FRG	Klaus Fischer	37	16	34	16	3	0
	DF	(West Germany) FRG	Florian Gothe	10	0	9	0	1	0
	MF	(West Germany) FRG	Peter Knäbel	2	1	1	1	1	0
	DF	(West Germany) FRG	Thomas Knauer	0	0	0	0	0	0
	DF	(West Germany) FRG	Heinz Knüwe	32	2	29	2	3	0
	DF	(West Germany) FRG	Martin Kree	30	2	27	2	3	0
	MF	(West Germany) FRG	Michael Kühn	15	0	14	0	1	0
	FW	(West Germany) FRG	Stefan Kuntz	37	14	34	11	3	3
	MF	(West Germany) FRG	Michael Lameck	36	1	33	0	3	1
	MF	(West Germany) FRG	Walter Oswald	32	1	29	1	3	0
	DF	(West Germany) FRG	Ingo Pickenäcker	24	0	22	0	2	0
	DF	(West Germany) FRG	Frank Saborowski (since 1 January 1985)	5	0	5	0	0	0
	FW	(West Germany) FRG	Toni Schreier	22	2	19	1	3	1
	MF	(West Germany) FRG	Frank Schulz	36	11	34	11	2	0
	DF	(West Germany) FRG	Franz-Josef Tenhagen	26	1	24	1	2	0
	DF	(West Germany) FRG	Lothar Woelk	35	2	32	1	3	1
	DF	(Socialist Federal Republic of Yugoslavia) YUG	Ivan Žugčić	27	0	25	0	2	0
	GK	(West Germany) FRG	Ralf Zumdick	36	0	34	0	2	0

=== Transfers ===
==== Summer ====
In:

No.	Pos.	Nation	Player
—	GK	FRG	Markus Croonen (from VfL Bochum II)
—	FW	FRG	Klaus Fischer (from 1. FC Köln)
—	MF	FRG	Peter Knäbel (from VfL Bochum youth)
—	DF	FRG	Thomas Knauer (from SV Holzwickede)
—	DF	FRG	Ingo Pickenäcker (from Borussia Mönchengladbach)
—	FW	FRG	Toni Schreier (from VfB Waltrop)
—	DF	FRG	Franz-Josef Tenhagen (from Borussia Dortmund)

Out:

No.	Pos.	Nation	Player
—	MF	FRG	Andreas Bordan (to SV Darmstadt 98)
—	DF	FRG	Bernd Gerber (to Blau-Weiß 90 Berlin)
—	DF	FRG	Hermann Gerland (to VfL Bochum II)
—	MF	FRG	Peter Grünberger (to SG Union Solingen)
—	FW	FRG	Günter Habig (to Alemannia Aachen)
—	FW	FRG	Frank Islacker (retired)
—	MF	FRG	Dieter Kramer (to VfL Bochum II)
—	FW	FRG	Detlef Krella (to 1. FC Nürnberg)
—	GK	FRG	Reinhard Mager (to Blau-Weiß 90 Berlin)
—	FW	FRG	Stefan Pater (to Arminia Bielefeld)
—	FW	FRG	Christian Schreier (to Bayer 04 Leverkusen)
—	MF	FRG	Reinhold Zagorny (to VfL Bochum II)

==== Winter ====
In:

No.	Pos.	Nation	Player
—	DF	FRG	Frank Saborowski (from Bayer 04 Leverkusen)

Out:

No.	Pos.	Nation	Player
