= 1987–88 VfL Bochum season =

VfL Bochum
1987–88 season
- President: Ottokar Wüst
- Head Coach: Hermann Gerland
- Stadium: Ruhrstadion
- Bundesliga: 12th
- DFB-Pokal: Runners-up
- Intertoto Cup: Group stage
- Top goalscorer: League: Leifeld (13); All: N/A
- Highest home attendance: 40,000 (vs FC Schalke 04, 25 August 1987)
- Lowest home attendance: 6,000 (vs FC 08 Homburg, 17 November 1987)
- Average home league attendance: 16,994
Home colours	Away colours	Third colours

The 1987–88 VfL Bochum season was the 50th season in club history.

== Matches ==
=== Legend ===
Win Draw Loss

=== Bundesliga ===
31 July 1987 1	VfL Bochum	1–2	Borussia Mönchengladbach	Bochum
20:00	Leifeld 88'		Bruns 31'; Rahn 39'	Stadium: Ruhrstadion; Attendance: 30,000; Referee: Aron Schmidhuber (Ottobrunn)

7 August 1987 2	Eintracht Frankfurt	0–1	VfL Bochum	Frankfurt am Main
20:00			Leifeld 54'	Stadium: Waldstadion; Attendance: 20,000; Referee: Anton Matheis (Rodalben)

15 August 1987 3	VfL Bochum	0–0	1. FC Köln	Bochum
15:30				Stadium: Ruhrstadion; Attendance: 18,000; Referee: Hans Scheuerer (Munich)

22 August 1987 4	SV Werder Bremen	0–0	VfL Bochum	Bremen
15:30				Stadium: Weserstadion; Attendance: 16,000; Referee: Eugen Strigel (Horb am Neckar)

25 August 1987 5	VfL Bochum	1–3	FC Schalke 04	Bochum
20:00	Kree 80'		Patzke 57'; Thon 75'; Wollitz 82'	Stadium: Ruhrstadion; Attendance: 40,000; Referee: Dieter Pauly (Rheydt)

1 September 1987 6	Hannover 96	1–0	VfL Bochum	Hannover
20:00	Reich 39'			Stadium: Niedersachsenstadion; Attendance: 14,000; Referee: Kurt Witke (Mönchzell)

4 September 1987 7	VfL Bochum	5–0	Karlsruher SC	Bochum
20:00	Leifeld 12', 77'; Nehl 28', 62'; Reekers 33'			Stadium: Ruhrstadion; Attendance: 10,000; Referee: Herbert Eli (Idar-Oberstein)

11 September 1987 8	1. FC Kaiserslautern	4–2	VfL Bochum	Kaiserslautern
20:00	Kohr 19'; Schulz 52'; Kree 60' (o.g.); Wuttke 89'		Leifeld 11'; Epp 20'	Stadium: Fritz-Walter-Stadion; Attendance: 15,487; Referee: Hans-Heinrich Barnick (Schenfeld)

19 September 1987 9	Hamburger SV	2–2	VfL Bochum	Hamburg
15:30	von Heesen 8'; Dittmer 62'		Knäbel 24'; Kree 53'	Stadium: Volksparkstadion; Attendance: 12,500; Referee: Manfred Amerell (Munich)

28 September 1987 10	VfL Bochum	1–4	Bayer 05 Uerdingen	Bochum
20:00	Heinemann 87'		Kuntz 9', 84'; Bommer 74' (pen.), 80'	Stadium: Ruhrstadion; Attendance: 5,000; Referee: Horst-Peter Bruch (Bischmisheim)

3 October 1987 11	VfB Stuttgart	3–0	VfL Bochum	Stuttgart
15:30	Klinsmann 36'; Walter 62', 77'			Stadium: Neckarstadion; Attendance: 17,000; Referee: Peter Gabor (West Berlin)

9 October 1987 12	VfL Bochum	3–1	Bayer 04 Leverkusen	Bochum
20:00	Nehl 17', 52'; Leifeld 28'		Cha 55'	Stadium: Ruhrstadion; Attendance: 11,000; Referee: Rainer Boos (Kronberg)

17 February 1988 13	Borussia Dortmund	1–2	VfL Bochum	Dortmund
20:00	Möller 42'		Riechmann 89'; Rzehaczek 90'	Stadium: Westfalenstadion; Attendance: 23,709; Referee: Hans Scheuerer (Munich)

31 October 1987 14	VfL Bochum	0–2	FC Bayern Munich	Bochum
15:30			Flick 69'; Wegmann 89'	Stadium: Ruhrstadion; Attendance: 35,000; Referee: Ralf Blattmann (Zeiningen)

6 November 1987 15	SV Waldhof Mannheim	1–1	VfL Bochum	Ludwigshafen am Rhein
20:00	Klotz 44'		Epp 64'	Stadium: Südweststadion; Attendance: 8,000; Referee: Wolfgang Mierswa (Hennigsen)

17 November 1987 16	VfL Bochum	4–4	FC 08 Homburg	Bochum
20:00	Epp 6', 61'; Legat 64'; Kree 67'		Westerbeek 5'; Jambo 40' (pen.); Schäfer 87', 90'	Stadium: Ruhrstadion; Attendance: 6,000; Referee: Wolf-Rüdiger Umbach (Rottdorf)

21 November 1987 17	1. FC Nürnberg	2–1	VfL Bochum	Nuremberg
15:30	Stenzel 9'; Grahammer 18'		Hantzidis 85'	Stadium: Städtisches Stadion; Attendance: 15,000; Referee: Wilfried Heitmann (Drentwede)

28 November 1987 18	Borussia Mönchengladbach	3–0	VfL Bochum	Mönchengladbach
15:30	Hochstätter 3', 32'; Krauss 57'			Stadium: Bökelbergstadion; Attendance: 8,230; Referee: Gerd Zimmermann (Kiel)

5 December 1987 19	VfL Bochum	1–0	Eintracht Frankfurt	Bochum
15:30	Kempe 52'			Stadium: Ruhrstadion; Attendance: 12,000; Referee: Hans-Joachim Osmers (Bremen)

20 February 1988 20	1. FC Köln	2–2	VfL Bochum	Cologne
15:30	Engels 9'; Woodcock 81'		Woelk 14'; Leifeld 53'	Stadium: Radrennbahn Müngersdorf; Attendance: 13,000; Referee: Manfred Amerell (Munich)

27 February 1988 21	VfL Bochum	0–1	SV Werder Bremen	Bochum
15:30			Ordenewitz 1'	Stadium: Ruhrstadion; Attendance: 17,000; Referee: Siegfried Brehm (Kemmern)

5 March 1988 22	FC Schalke 04	2–1	VfL Bochum	Gelsenkirchen
15:30	Tschiskale 51'; Thon 73' (pen.)		Rzehaczek 67'	Stadium: Parkstadion; Attendance: 15,800; Referee: Manfred Neuner (Leimen)

19 April 1988 23	VfL Bochum	1–1	Hannover 96	Bochum
20:00	Leifeld 77'		Kohn 87'	Stadium: Ruhrstadion; Attendance: 15,000; Referee: Peter Gabor (West Berlin)

19 March 1988 24	Karlsruher SC	1–0	VfL Bochum	Karlsruhe
15:30	Hermann 70'			Stadium: Wildparkstadion; Attendance: 13,500; Referee: Horst-Peter Bruch (Bischmisheim)

22 March 1988 25	VfL Bochum	1–1	1. FC Kaiserslautern	Bochum
20:00	Leifeld 10'		Allievi 23'	Stadium: Ruhrstadion; Attendance: 9,200; Referee: Eugen Strigel (Horb am Neckar)

26 March 1988 26	VfL Bochum	4–0	Hamburger SV	Bochum
15:30	Iwan 13'; Leifeld 24', 55'; Nehl 73'			Stadium: Ruhrstadion; Attendance: 8,700; Referee: Karl-Heinz Tritschler (Freiburg)

9 April 1988 27	Bayer 05 Uerdingen	3–1	VfL Bochum	Krefeld
15:30	Fach 30'; Mathy 32'; Prytz 77'		Leifeld 7'	Stadium: Grotenburg-Stadion; Attendance: 9,600; Referee: Aron Schmidhuber (Ottobrunn)

16 April 1988 28	VfL Bochum	5–1	VfB Stuttgart	Bochum
15:30	Iwan 4'; Kree 19'; Schäfer 22' (o.g.); Leifeld 70'; Nehl 73'		Buchwald 61'	Stadium: Ruhrstadion; Attendance: 13,000; Referee: Wolf-Günter Wiesel (Ottbergen)

23 April 1988 29	Bayer 04 Leverkusen	0–0	VfL Bochum	Leverkusen
15:30				Stadium: Ulrich-Haberland-Stadion; Attendance: 9,000; Referee: Manfred Neuner (Leimen)

30 April 1988 30	VfL Bochum	2–0	Borussia Dortmund	Bochum
15:30	Kree 37' (pen.), 80'			Stadium: Ruhrstadion; Attendance: 32,000; Referee: Kurt Witke (Mönchzell)

3 May 1988 31	FC Bayern Munich	5–0	VfL Bochum	Munich
20:00	Hughes 51', 62', 68'; Eder 61'; Dorfner 83'			Stadium: Olympiastadion; Attendance: 8,500; Referee: Hans-Heinrich Barnick (Schenfeld)

6 May 1988 32	VfL Bochum	1–0	SV Waldhof Mannheim	Bochum
20:00	Kree 27'			Stadium: Ruhrstadion; Attendance: 12,000; Referee: Heinz Werner (Auersmacher)

14 May 1988 33	FC 08 Homburg	1–1	VfL Bochum	Homburg
15:30	Freiler 62'		Knäbel 50'	Stadium: Waldstadion; Attendance: 5,000; Referee: Siegfried Brehm (Kemmern)

21 May 1988 34	VfL Bochum	3–0	1. FC Nürnberg	Bochum
15:30	Reekers 28'; Kempe 65'; Zumdick 88' (pen.)			Stadium: Ruhrstadion; Attendance: 15,000; Referee: Hans-Joachim Osmers (Bremen)

=== DFB-Pokal ===
28 August 1987 R1	VfB Oldenburg	0–0 (a.e.t.)	VfL Bochum	Oldenburg
18:45				Stadium: Marschweg-Stadion; Attendance: 8,200; Referee: Peter Mölm (Bremerhaven)

13 October 1987 R1 replay	VfL Bochum	4–1	VfB Oldenburg	Bochum
20:00	Woelk 27', 69' (pen.); Nehl 57'; Fischer 83'		Voigt 90'	Stadium: Ruhrstadion; Attendance: 2,568; Referee: Michael Prengel (Düsseldorf)

24 October 1987 R2	TSG Giengen	1–2 (a.e.t.)	VfL Bochum	Giengen an der Brenz
14:30	Gentner 84'		Fischer 33'; Hantzidis 112'	Stadium: TSG-Stadion auf dem Schießberg; Attendance: 3,300; Referee: Holger Dehmelt (Sasbachwalden)

14 February 1988 R3	Schwarz-Weiß Essen	0–1	VfL Bochum	Essen
15:00			Leifeld 57'	Stadium: Uhlenkrugstadion; Attendance: 15,000; Referee: Edgar Steinborn (Sinzig)

8 March 1988 QF	VfL Bochum	4–1	Fortuna Köln	Bochum
	Leifeld 70', 83'; Iwan 87'; Epp 88'		Pförtner 29'	Stadium: Ruhrstadion; Attendance: 5,000; Referee: Eugen Strigel (Horb am Neckar)

12 April 1988 SF	VfL Bochum	2–0	Hamburger SV	Bochum
	Kree 27'; Iwan 60'			Stadium: Ruhrstadion; Attendance: 31,000; Referee: Hans Scheuerer (Munich)

28 May 1988 F	Eintracht Frankfurt	1–0	VfL Bochum	West Berlin
18:00	Détári 81'			Stadium: Olympic Stadium; Attendance: 76,000; Referee: Wilfried Heitmann (Drentwede)

=== Intertoto Cup ===
27 June 1987 GS1	Bnei Yehuda Tel Aviv F.C. (Israel)	2–2	VfL Bochum
				Attendance: 1,000

4 July 1987 GS2	Beitar Jerusalem F.C. (Israel)	0–0	VfL Bochum
				Attendance: 400

12 July 1987 GS3	VfL Bochum	1–0	(Israel) Bnei Yehuda Tel Aviv F.C.
	Epp 60'			Attendance: 1,000

18 July 1987 GS4	VfL Bochum	4–0	(Israel) Beitar Jerusalem F.C.
	Leifeld 36'; Nehl 41'; Kadosh 54' (o.g.); Lameck 55' (pen.)			Attendance: 1,000

25 July 1987 GS5	VfL Bochum	2–3	(Denmark) Brøndby IF
	Kree 19'; Fischer 62'		Frank 41', 65'; Olsen 64'	Attendance: 1,000

27 July 1987 GS6	Brøndby IF (Denmark)	1–0	VfL Bochum
	Vilfort 58'			Attendance: 2,500

== Squad ==
=== Squad and statistics ===
==== Squad, appearances and goals scored ====
No.	Pos	Nat	Player	Total		Bundesliga		DFB-Pokal		Intertoto Cup	
No.	Pos	Nat	Player	Apps	Goals	Apps	Goals	Apps	Goals	Apps	Goals
	MF	(West Germany) FRG	Frank Benatelli	20	0	15	0	5	0		
	MF	(West Germany) FRG	Dirk Bremser	0	0	0	0	0	0		
	MF	(West Germany) FRG	Olaf Dreßel	3	0	2	0	1	0		
	FW	(West Germany) FRG	Thomas Epp	36	5	31	4	5	1		
	FW	(West Germany) FRG	Klaus Fischer	15	2	12	0	3	2		
	FW	(Greece) GRE	Minas Hantzidis (21 October 1987 until 31 December 1987)	4	2	3	1	1	1		
	MF	(West Germany) FRG	Frank Heinemann	30	1	25	1	5	0		
	MF	(West Germany) FRG	Michael Hubner	4	0	3	0	1	0		
	MF	(Poland) POL	Andrzej Iwan	20	4	16	2	4	2		
	DF	(West Germany) FRG	Peter Jackisch	12	0	12	0	0	0		
	DF	(West Germany) FRG	Thomas Kempe	34	2	29	2	5	0		
	MF	(West Germany) FRG	Peter Knäbel	24	2	20	2	4	0		
	MF	(West Germany) FRG	Volker Knappheide	0	0	0	0	0	0		
	DF	(West Germany) FRG	Martin Kree	36	8	32	7	4	1		
	MF	(West Germany) FRG	Michael Lameck	20	0	16	0	4	0		
	MF	(West Germany) FRG	Thorsten Legat	20	1	17	1	3	0		
	FW	(West Germany) FRG	Uwe Leifeld	37	16	30	13	7	3		
	FW	(West Germany) FRG	Andreas Lübke	1	0	1	0	0	0		
	MF	(West Germany) FRG	Detlef Mikolajczak	10	0	8	0	2	0		
	FW	(West Germany) FRG	Josef Nehl	32	7	27	6	5	1		
	DF	(West Germany) FRG	Walter Oswald	32	0	26	0	6	0		
	DF	(Netherlands) NED	Rob Reekers	32	2	26	2	6	0		
	MF	(West Germany) FRG	Dirk Riechmann (since 17 February 1988)	4	1	3	1	1	0		
	MF	(West Germany) FRG	Michael Rzehaczek (since 4 September 1987)	18	2	15	2	3	0		
	DF	(West Germany) FRG	Franz-Josef Tenhagen	1	0	1	0	0	0		
	GK	(West Germany) FRG	Andreas Wessels	6	0	5	0	1	0		
	DF	(West Germany) FRG	Lothar Woelk	40	3	33	1	7	2		
	GK	(West Germany) FRG	Ralf Zumdick	35	1	29	1	6	0		

=== Transfers ===
==== Summer ====
In:

No.	Pos.	Nation	Player
—	MF	FRG	Olaf Dreßel (from VfL Bochum youth)
—	FW	FRG	Thomas Epp (from VfB Stuttgart youth)
—	FW	GRE	Minas Hantzidis (from Bayer 04 Leverkusen)
—	MF	FRG	Michael Hubner (from VfL Bochum youth)
—	MF	POL	Andrzej Iwan (from Górnik Zabrze)
—	DF	FRG	Peter Jackisch (from VfB Remscheid)
—	MF	FRG	Michael Rzehaczek (from VfL Bochum II)

Out:

No.	Pos.	Nation	Player
—	DF	FRG	Siegfried Bönighausen (retired)
—	FW	FRG	Rudolf Decker (to Rot-Weiß Oberhausen)
—	MF	FRG	Michael Kühn (to BVL Remscheid)
—	FW	FRG	Franz Schick (to TSV Ampfing)
—	MF	FRG	Frank Schulz (to Eintracht Frankfurt)
—	MF	FRG	Uwe Wegmann (to Rot-Weiß Essen)
—	DF	FRG	Jürgen Wielert (to Rot-Weiß Oberhausen)
—	DF	YUG	Ivan Žugčić (to SG Wattenscheid 09)

==== Winter ====
In:

No.	Pos.	Nation	Player
—	MF	FRG	Dirk Riechmann (from VfL Bochum II)

Out:

No.	Pos.	Nation	Player
—	FW	GRE	Minas Hantzidis (to Olympiacos F.C.)
