= 1982–83 VfL Bochum season =

VfL Bochum
1982–83 season
- President: Ottokar Wüst
- Head Coach: Rolf Schafstall
- Stadium: Ruhrstadion
- Bundesliga: 13th
- DFB-Pokal: Quarterfinals
- Top goalscorer: League: Wolfgang Patzke, Christian Schreier (both 8); All: Christian Schreier (12)
- Highest home attendance: 38,000 (vs FC Schalke 04, 27 November 1982)
- Lowest home attendance: 6,000 (vs 1. FC Nürnberg, 28 May 1983)
- Average home league attendance: 15,824
Home colours	Away colours	Third colours

The 1982–83 VfL Bochum season was the 45th season in club history.

== Matches ==
=== Legend ===
Win Draw Loss

=== Bundesliga ===
21 August 1982 1	Fortuna Düsseldorf	2–0	VfL Bochum	Düsseldorf
15:30	Wenzel 40' (pen.), 73' (pen.)			Stadium: Rheinstadion; Attendance: 10,000; Referee: Winfried Walz (Waiblingen)

24 August 1982 2	VfL Bochum	0–1	Karlsruher SC	Bochum
20:00			Becker 54'	Stadium: Ruhrstadion; Attendance: 10,000; Referee: Udo Horeis (Hamburg)

1 September 1982 3	Bayer 04 Leverkusen	1–0	VfL Bochum	Leverkusen
19:30	Hörster 26'			Stadium: Ulrich-Haberland-Stadion; Attendance: 6,500; Referee: Aron Schmidhuber (Ottobrunn)

4 September 1982 4	VfL Bochum	1–1	Arminia Bielefeld	Bochum
15:30	Knüwe 2'		Grillemeier 54'	Stadium: Ruhrstadion; Attendance: 12,000; Referee: Friedrich Retzmann (Pinneberg)

11 September 1982 5	Eintracht Frankfurt	0–1	VfL Bochum	Frankfurt am Main
15:30			Pater 49'	Stadium: Waldstadion; Attendance: 14,000; Referee: Hans-Joachim Osmers (Bremen)

17 September 1982 6	VfL Bochum	0–2	Eintracht Braunschweig	Bochum
20:00			Keute 48'; Zavišić 64'	Stadium: Ruhrstadion; Attendance: 15,000; Referee: Klaus Clajus (Karlsruhe)

25 September 1982 7	VfL Bochum	0–0	FC Bayern Munich	Bochum
15:30				Stadium: Ruhrstadion; Attendance: 28,000; Referee: Volker Roth (Salzgitter)

2 October 1982 8	Hamburger SV	0–0	VfL Bochum	Hamburg
15:30				Stadium: Volksparkstadion; Attendance: 17,000; Referee: Manfred Neuner (Leimen)

9 October 1982 9	VfL Bochum	3–1	Borussia Mönchengladbach	Bochum
15:30	Patzke 48'; Pater 73'; Oswald 83'		Bruns 10'	Stadium: Ruhrstadion; Attendance: 20,000; Referee: Karl-Josef Assenmacher (Fischenich)

23 October 1982 10	VfB Stuttgart	5–2	VfL Bochum	Stuttgart
15:30	Allgöwer 6', 81'; Förster 19'; Reichert 44'; Kelsch 90'		Woelk 58' (pen.); Schlierer 74' (o.g.)	Stadium: Neckarstadion; Attendance: 13,500; Referee: Gerhard Theobald (Neunkirchen)

30 October 1982 11	VfL Bochum	4–0	Hertha BSC	Bochum
15:30	Oswald 42'; Schreier 54', 82'; Woelk 88' (pen.)			Stadium: Ruhrstadion; Attendance: 12,000; Referee: Jürgen Meßmer (Mannheim)

6 November 1982 12	1. FC Köln	4–1	VfL Bochum	Cologne
15:30	Littbarski 50', 72'; Fischer 66', 70'		Storck 73'	Stadium: Radrennbahn Müngersdorf; Attendance: 10,000; Referee: Robert Walz (Waiblingen)

13 November 1982 13	VfL Bochum	1–1	1. FC Kaiserslautern	Bochum
15:30	Oswald 55'		Allofs 28'	Stadium: Ruhrstadion; Attendance: 12,000; Referee: Wilfried Heitmann (Drentwede)

19 November 1982 14	Borussia Dortmund	3–1	VfL Bochum	Dortmund
19:30	Burgsmüller 20'; Koch 35'; Abramczik 55'		Patzke 64'	Stadium: Westfalenstadion; Attendance: 27,000; Referee: Walter Eschweiler (Bonn)

27 November 1982 15	VfL Bochum	2–1	FC Schalke 04	Bochum
15:30	Patzke 55'; Knüwe 90'		Abel 68'	Stadium: Ruhrstadion; Attendance: 38,000; Referee: Norbert Brückner (Darmstadt)

4 December 1982 16	1. FC Nürnberg	1–1	VfL Bochum	Nuremberg
15:30	Heck 60'		Schreier 42'	Stadium: Städtisches Stadion; Attendance: 13,500; Referee: Hans-Heinrich Barnick (Schenfeld)

11 December 1982 17	VfL Bochum	1–2	SV Werder Bremen	Bochum
15:30	Lameck 26'		Okudera 64'; Völler 71'	Stadium: Ruhrstadion; Attendance: 8,000; Referee: Franz-Josef Hontheim (Trier)

22 January 1983 18	VfL Bochum	3–1	Fortuna Düsseldorf	Bochum
15:30	Pater 55'; Patzke 70'; Lameck 83'		Weikl 62'	Stadium: Ruhrstadion; Attendance: 14,000; Referee: Dieter Stäglich (Bonn)

29 January 1983 19	Karlsruher SC	0–0	VfL Bochum	Karlsruhe
15:30				Stadium: Wildparkstadion; Attendance: 11,000; Referee: Aron Schmidhuber (Ottobrunn)

2 April 1983 20	VfL Bochum	3–2	Bayer 04 Leverkusen	Bochum
15:30	Patzke 29', 73'; Kühn 89'		Vöge 29', 41'	Stadium: Ruhrstadion; Attendance: 9,000; Referee: Dieter Pauly (Rheydt)

19 February 1983 21	Arminia Bielefeld	1–1	VfL Bochum	Bielefeld
15:30	Riedl 85'		Schreier 45'	Stadium: Alm; Attendance: 12,000; Referee: Jakob Wippker (Aachen)

26 February 1983 22	VfL Bochum	1–2	Eintracht Frankfurt	Bochum
15:30	Schreier 9' (pen.)		Sziedat 19'; Körbel 65' (pen.)	Stadium: Ruhrstadion; Attendance: 7,000; Referee: Wolf-Rüdiger Umbach (Rottdorf)

5 March 1983 23	Eintracht Braunschweig	0–2	VfL Bochum	Braunschweig
15:30			Schreier 68'; Pater 73'	Stadium: Eintracht-Stadion; Attendance: 11,000; Referee: Siegfried Brehm (Kemmern)

12 March 1983 24	FC Bayern Munich	3–0	VfL Bochum	Munich
15:30	Breitner 56' (pen.); Del'Haye 63'; Rummenigge 65'			Stadium: Olympiastadion; Attendance: 18,000; Referee: Arturo Martino (Switzerland)

19 March 1983 25	VfL Bochum	1–1	Hamburger SV	Bochum
15:30	Patzke 61'		Hartwig 22'	Stadium: Ruhrstadion; Attendance: 22,000; Referee: Walter Engel (Reimsbach)

26 March 1983 26	Borussia Mönchengladbach	3–1	VfL Bochum	Mönchengladbach
15:30	Reich 5'; Hannes 19'; Matthäus 81'		Knüwe 42'	Stadium: Bökelbergstadion; Attendance: 9,721; Referee: Volker Huster (Lahnstein)

9 April 1983 27	VfL Bochum	2–2	VfB Stuttgart	Bochum
15:30	Kühn 59'; Lameck 79'		Allgöwer 21'; Six 82'	Stadium: Ruhrstadion; Attendance: 18,000; Referee: Hans-Peter Dellwing (Trier)

16 April 1983 28	Hertha BSC	1–1	VfL Bochum	West Berlin
15:30	Mohr 79'		Knüwe 41'	Stadium: Olympiastadion; Attendance: 15,112; Referee: Karl-Heinz Tritschler (Freiburg)

30 April 1983 29	VfL Bochum	0–0	1. FC Köln	Bochum
15:30				Stadium: Ruhrstadion; Attendance: 18,000; Referee: Hans-Heinrich Barnick (Schenfeld)

7 May 1983 30	1. FC Kaiserslautern	1–0	VfL Bochum	Kaiserslautern
15:30	Briegel 10'			Stadium: Betzenbergstadion; Attendance: 20,300; Referee: Peter Gabor (West Berlin)

14 May 1983 31	VfL Bochum	2–2	Borussia Dortmund	Bochum
15:30	Patzke 43'; Oswald 84'		Klotz 13'; Abramczik 87'	Stadium: Ruhrstadion; Attendance: 20,000; Referee: Udo Horeis (Hamburg)

20 May 1983 32	FC Schalke 04	2–0	VfL Bochum	Gelsenkirchen
20:00	Abel 57'; Opitz 89'			Stadium: Parkstadion; Attendance: 17,500; Referee: Karl-Josef Assenmacher (Fischenich)

28 May 1983 33	VfL Bochum	6–0	1. FC Nürnberg	Bochum
15:30	Pater 5', 87'; Bast 19'; Schreier 42' (pen.); Jakobs 46'; Knüwe 86'			Stadium: Ruhrstadion; Attendance: 6,000; Referee: Wolf-Günter Wiesel (Ottbergen)

4 June 1983 34	SV Werder Bremen	3–2	VfL Bochum	Bremen
15:30	Völler 17'; Reinders 49'; Siegmann 74'		Schreier 13'; Krella 63'	Stadium: Weserstadion; Attendance: 40,000; Referee: Max Klauser (Munich)

=== DFB-Pokal ===
28 August 1982 R1	VfL Bochum	3–1	Karlsruher SC	Bochum
	Woelk 7'; Knüwe 9'; Storck 59'		Groß 80'	Stadium: Ruhrstadion; Attendance: 6,000; Referee: Jakob Wippker (Aachen)

16 October 1982 R2	Hammer SpVg	1–1 (a.e.t.)	VfL Bochum	Hamm
	Ho. Krause 79'		Lameck 76'	Stadium: Mahlbergstadion; Attendance: 7,000; Referee: Wolf-Dieter Ahlenfelder (Oberhausen)

26 October 1982 R2 replay	VfL Bochum	6–1	Hammer SpVg	Bochum
	Schreier 26', 56', 65'; Bittorf 71'; Bast 85'; Krella 90'		Golak 83'	Stadium: Ruhrstadion; Attendance: 4,000; Referee: Rudolf Stark (Troisdorf)

18 December 1982 R3	TSV 1860 Munich	1–3	VfL Bochum	Munich
	Alt 13' (pen.)		Schreier 50'; Knüwe 54', 78'	Stadium: Stadion an der Grünwalder Straße; Attendance: 5,500; Referee: Anton Ulm (Saulgau)

8 March 1983 QF	Borussia Dortmund	3–1 (a.e.t.)	VfL Bochum	Dortmund
	Keser 11'; Răducanu 114'; Schmedding 118'		Pater 73'	Stadium: Westfalenstadion; Attendance: 35,000; Referee: Jürgen Meßmer (Mannheim)

== Squad ==
=== Squad and statistics ===
==== Squad, appearances and goals scored ====
No.	Pos	Nat	Player	Total		Bundesliga		DFB-Pokal	
No.	Pos	Nat	Player	Apps	Goals	Apps	Goals	Apps	Goals
	FW	(Sweden) SWE	Thomas Andersson (since 1 January 1983)	5	0	5	0	0	0
	DF	(West Germany) FRG	Dieter Bast	39	2	34	1	5	1
	FW	(West Germany) FRG	Frank Benatelli	8	0	8	0	0	0
	MF	(West Germany) FRG	Ulrich Bittorf	12	1	10	0	2	1
	MF	(West Germany) FRG	Andreas Bordan	4	0	3	0	1	0
	DF	(West Germany) FRG	Hermann Gerland	4	0	3	0	1	0
	FW	(West Germany) FRG	Frank Islacker	3	0	3	0	0	0
	DF	(West Germany) FRG	Michael Jakobs	37	1	32	1	5	0
	DF	(West Germany) FRG	Heinz Knüwe	38	8	33	5	5	3
	MF	(West Germany) FRG	Dieter Kramer	7	0	6	0	1	0
	MF	(West Germany) FRG	Detlef Krella	18	2	16	1	2	1
	MF	(West Germany) FRG	Michael Kühn	12	2	9	2	3	0
	MF	(West Germany) FRG	Michael Lameck	39	4	34	3	5	1
	GK	(West Germany) FRG	Reinhard Mager	1	0	1	0	0	0
	MF	(West Germany) FRG	Walter Oswald	36	4	32	4	4	0
	FW	(West Germany) FRG	Stefan Pater	35	7	32	6	3	1
	MF	(West Germany) FRG	Wolfgang Patzke	35	8	31	8	4	0
	FW	(West Germany) FRG	Christian Schreier	38	12	33	8	5	4
	DF	(West Germany) FRG	Bernd Storck	26	2	21	1	5	1
	DF	(West Germany) FRG	Lothar Woelk	39	3	34	2	5	1
	MF	(West Germany) FRG	Reinhold Zagorny	1	0	1	0	0	0
	DF	(Socialist Federal Republic of Yugoslavia) YUG	Ivan Žugčić	16	0	14	0	2	0
	GK	(West Germany) FRG	Ralf Zumdick	38	0	33	0	5	0

=== Transfers ===
==== Summer ====
In:

No.	Pos.	Nation	Player
—	MF	FRG	Andreas Bordan (from VfL Bochum youth)
—	FW	FRG	Frank Islacker (from VfL Bochum II)
—	MF	FRG	Dieter Kramer (from Hamburger SV)
—	MF	FRG	Detlef Krella (from VfL Bochum youth)
—	FW	FRG	Stefan Pater (from SC Neheim)

Out:

No.	Pos.	Nation	Player
—	FW	FRG	Hans-Joachim Abel (to FC Schalke 04)
—	MF	FRG	Rolf Blau (to Hertha BSC)
—	FW	FRG	Frank Eggeling (to Eintracht Braunschweig)
—	FW	FRG	Dieter Lemke (to SC Fortuna Köln)
—	MF	FRG	Klaus Zagorny (to VfL Bochum II)

==== Winter ====
In:

No.	Pos.	Nation	Player
—	FW	SWE	Thomas Andersson (from Vasalunds IF)
—	MF	FRG	Frank Benatelli (from VfL Bochum II)

Out:

No.	Pos.	Nation	Player
