= Dominique Blanc =

Dominique Blanc may refer to:

- Dominique Blanc (actress) (born 1956), French actress
- Dominique Blanc (football administrator), Swiss football official, businessman former player and former referee
