= Benatelli =

Benatelli is a surname. Notable people with the surname include:

- Frank Benatelli (born 1962), German footballer and coach
- Rico Benatelli (born 1992), German footballer, son of Frank
