= Bernd Storck =

German football player and manager (born 1963)

Bernd Storck HOM
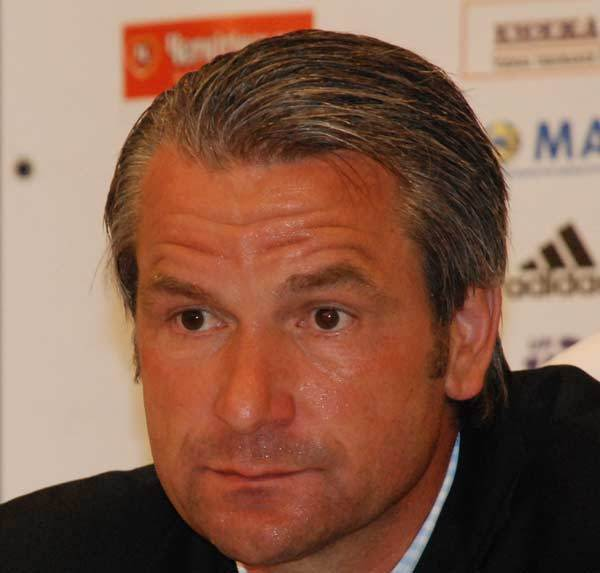
- Storck in 2009

Personal information
- Date of birth: 25 January 1963 (age 63)
- Place of birth: Herne, West Germany
- Height: 1.82 m (6 ft 0 in)
- Position: Defender

Team information
- Current team: Gençlerbirliği (head coach)

Youth career
- –1977: SV Boele-Kabel
- 1977–1981: VfL Bochum

Senior career*
Years	Team	Apps	(Gls)
1981–1983	VfL Bochum	24	(1)
1983–1989	Borussia Dortmund	146	(7)
Total		170	(8)

International career
1983	West Germany U21	7	(0)

Managerial career
- 1994–1995: VfB Stuttgart (assistant)
- 1996–2002: Hertha BSC (assistant)
- 2003–2004: VfL Wolfsburg (assistant)
- 2005–2006: Partizan (assistant)
- 2006–2007: Borussia Dortmund (assistant)
- 2008: Almaty
- 2008: Kazakhstan U21
- 2008–2010: Kazakhstan
- 2011: Kazakhstan U19 (sporting director)
- 2012–2014: Olympiacos (head of youth development)
- 2012–2014: Olympiacos U20
- 2015–2017: Hungary (sporting director)
- 2015: Hungary U20
- 2015–2017: Hungary
- 2018–2019: Excel Mouscron
- 2019–2020: Cercle Brugge
- 2020–2021: DAC Dunajská Streda
- 2021–2022: Genk
- 2022: Eupen
- 2022–2023: Kortrijk
- 2023–2024: Sepsi OSK
- 2025: Kortrijk
- 2025: Cercle Brugge
- 2026–: Gençlerbirliği
- * Club domestic league appearances and goals

Bernd Storck, HOM (born 25 January 1963) is a German professional football coach and former player who played as a defender who is currently head coach of Süper Lig club Gençlerbirliği.

== Club career ==
Storck made his player debut in the Bundesliga with VfL Bochum as a defender. In the summer of 1983, he moved to Borussia Dortmund, where he remained for six years. His biggest success as a pro was winning the 1988–89 DFB-Pokal. He played in 170 Bundesliga matches and scored eight goals.

== Managerial career ==
After ending his playing career, he completed a manager's course and was an assistant coach with Borussia Dortmund, VfB Stuttgart, Hertha BSC, VfL Wolfsburg, and Partizan.

=== Almaty ===
In the middle of the 2008 season, he was appointed manager of Kazakh side FC Almaty to help the club avoid relegation in 2008.

=== Kazakhstan ===
At the same time he also managed Kazakhstan national under-21 team.

Storck has complained about the state of the Kazakhstan Premier League and the lack of cooperation he encountered from the local clubs' management.

On 1 March 2010, Storck signed a new one-year contract as coach of Kazakhstan national team. Viktor Katkov, vice-president of Football Federation of Kazakhstan, said that "Our young team are progressing with every match, as shown by the games against Croatia and Ukraine at the end of 2010 FIFA World Cup qualifying. Bernd's football philosophy is a modern one and we are sure it will promote further improvement." Storck added: "I am proud to have the opportunity to continue my work with the Football Federation of Kazakhstan. We have made progress and I am keen to continue working with the team. It is interesting for me to see young footballers develop, and the whole of Kazakh football is developing right now and its status in Europe improving. I hope our work together will bear fruit and that the team can do well for the fans in Euro 2012 qualifying."

He was sacked on 16 October 2010 after a poor start to UEFA Euro 2012 qualifying, losing to Turkey, Austria and Belgium. His final game was a 3–0 defeat against Germany. Sayan Khamitzhanov, general secretary of the Football Federation of Kazakhstan said that "We can see the team progressing because young players are gaining important experience. However, he (Storck) had a task to collect at least three points in four matches and that was not done. That is why the federation has decided to turn to another coach."

=== Hungary U20 ===
Storck was the coach for the Hungary national under-20 team at the 2015 FIFA U-20 World Cup. Hungary won their opening match against North Korea which was enough, as they went to lose to Brazil and Nigeria in the other group stage matches. However, in the round of 16, they were knocked out by eventual winners Serbia in a 2–1 extra time loss.

=== Hungary ===
On 20 July 2015, he was appointed as the head coach of the Hungary national team after the resignation of Pál Dárdai, who became the manager of the Bundesliga club, Hertha BSC.

On 4 September 2015, Hungary drew 0–0 with Romania at the Groupama Arena, and three days later on 7 September 2015 Hungary drew with Northern Ireland at Windsor Park.

Storck fired the assistant coaches of the Hungary national team on 20 October 2015, including Imre Szabics, István Sallói and József Andrusch. Storck convinced his former teammate, Andreas Möller, to help him preparing the national team against Norway in the UEFA Euro 2016 qualifying play-offs.

Hungary qualified for the UEFA Euro 2016 on 15 November 2015 after 44 years when Hungary was qualified for the UEFA Euro 1972. Hungary beat Norway in the first leg of the UEFA Euro 2016 qualifying play-offs 1–0. The only goal was scored by László Kleinheisler, who had not played a single match in the 2015–16 season in his club Videoton. On the return match, Storck's team beat Norway 2–1 and qualified for the UEFA Euro 2016 finals.

One day after the successful playoff match against Norway, Storck extended his contract with the Hungarian Football Federation until the end of the UEFA Euro 2016.

In an interview with the Hertha BSC's official website, Pál Dárdai, former head coach of Hungary, said that he built the base of the team, while Storck added his part to reach the finals of the UEFA Euro 2016.

Storck was asked in an interview with Nemzeti Sport what his best decisions were since his appointment. He said that he would have liked to attack against Romania in the UEFA Euro 2016 qualifying Group F match at the Groupama Arena, to show his philosophy but he decided to defend because he did not have enough time before the match to rebuild the team. He also pointed out that the fact that he had nominated both Gábor Király and Richárd Guzmics in the starting line-up had been a good decision.

On 14 June 2016, Storck managed Hungary in the first group match in a 2–0 victory over Austria at the UEFA Euro 2016 Group F match at the Nouveau Stade de Bordeaux. Three days later on 18 June 2016, his team drew 1–1 with Iceland at the Stade Vélodrome. In the last group match Hungary drew 3–3 with Portugal at Parc Olympique Lyonnais on 22 June 2016.

He offered his resignation on 15 June 2017 after a shocking 1–0 defeat against Andorra in the 2018 FIFA World Cup qualification match. However, the director of the Hungarian Football Federation did not accept his resignation, therefore Storck was confirmed in his position and was a given another opportunity to gain more points during the qualification process.

On 17 October 2017, Storck lost his job in Hungary with mutual agreement.

=== Belgian Pro League ===
Since 2018, Storck has largely coached in Belgium, first taking charge of Excel Mouscron for the 2018-19 season, moving onto Cercle Brugge in October 2019. Cercle won their final four games to stay up, lying in 14th position when the campaign was ended early due to the COVID-19 pandemic.

Storck moved to Slovakia to coach DAC Dunajská Streda under a two-year deal commencing at the start of the 2020-21 season. His contract was surprisingly terminated in April 2021 - reportedly by mutual consent - with a month still to go in the league season with DAC lying in second place, ten points behind eventual winners Slovan Bratislava.

Storck was recalled to Belgium in December 2021 by Racing Genk, who had been runners-up for the 2020-21 season, but whose title challenge for the following campaign was faltering. He replaced John van den Brom.

After a lacklustre campaign, Genk announced on 22 May 2022 that Storck and the club had mutually agreed to part ways.

Three days after leaving Genk, Storck was hired by Eupen for their 2022-23 campaign, but was dismissed just three months into the season, having picked up 14 points from their first 14 games of the season by October 2022.

Within a month, Storck had been appointed by Kortrijk for their relegation fight, taking over the club with them in 17th place, second-from-bottom in the league. After keeping the Kerels up at the end of the 2022-23 season, Storck left of his own accord.

Spending the 2023-24 season in Romania with Sepsi OSK, Storck returned for a second spell at Kortrijk in February 2025, again taking over in the midst of a relegation battle. Having saved the club's top-flight status previously, Storck was unable to prevent them from going down this time.

48 hours after Kortrijk's final game, Storck was re-signed by Cercle Brugge for the two legs of their promotion-relegation play-off final against Patro Eisden in a bid to keep them up, Cercle having already gone through three previous coaches that season. Cercle won 8-2 on aggregate to stay in the top division, and Storck was immediately replaced by Austria assistant national team coach Onur Cinel.

== Awards ==
On 15 March 2018, Storck was awarded with the Order of Merit of Hungary.

== Career statistics ==
=== Club ===
Appearances and goals by club, season and competition
Club	Season	League			Cup		Continental		Total	
Club	Season	Division	Apps	Goals	Apps	Goals	Apps	Goals	Apps	Goals
VfL Bochum	1981–82	Bundesliga	3	0	0	0	—		3	0
VfL Bochum	1982–83	Bundesliga	21	1	5	1	—		26	2
VfL Bochum	Total		24	1	5	1	0	0	29	2
Borussia Dortmund	1983–84	Bundesliga	25	1	0	0	—		25	1
Borussia Dortmund	1984–85	Bundesliga	32	1	3	0	—		35	1
Borussia Dortmund	1985–86	Bundesliga	31	1	4	0	—		35	1
Borussia Dortmund	1986–87	Bundesliga	24	1	2	0	—		26	1
Borussia Dortmund	1987–88	Bundesliga	14	3	2	0	2	0	18	3
Borussia Dortmund	1988–89	Bundesliga	21	0	5	2	—		26	2
Borussia Dortmund	Total		147	7	16	2	2	0	165	9
Career total			171	8	21	3	2	0	194	11

=== Managerial ===
As of match played 21 November 2026

Team	Nat	From	To	Record							
Team	Nat	From	To	P	W	D	L	GF	GA	GD	W%
Almaty	(Kazakhstan)	1 July 2008	16 November 2008	18	8	6	4	30	25	+5	44.44
Kazakhstan U21	(Kazakhstan)	1 July 2008	15 September 2008	2	1	0	1	4	2	+2	50.00
Kazakhstan	(Kazakhstan)	16 September 2008	15 October 2010	14	3	0	11	12	35	−23	21.43
Hungary U20	(Hungary)	1 April 2015	10 June 2015	5	2	0	3	14	7	+7	40.00
Hungary	(Hungary)	20 July 2015	17 October 2017	25	8	7	10	30	37	−7	32.00
Excel Mouscron	(Belgium)	2 September 2018	30 June 2019	36	14	10	12	56	48	+8	38.89
Cercle Brugge	(Belgium)	12 October 2019	31 May 2020	19	6	2	11	19	27	−8	31.58
Dunajská Streda	(Slovakia)	1 June 2020	21 April 2021	40	23	8	9	90	57	+33	57.50
Genk	(Belgium)	7 December 2021	30 June 2022	24	12	4	8	45	27	+18	50.00
Eupen	(Belgium)	1 July 2022	22 October 2022	14	4	0	10	15	29	−14	28.57
Kortrijk	(Belgium)	22 November 2022	30 June 2023	19	6	4	9	26	30	−4	31.58
Sepsi OSK	(Romania)	30 November 2023	5 September 2024	32	12	8	12	50	45	+5	37.50
Kortrijk	(Belgium)	20 February 2025	11 May 2025	10	5	3	2	19	14	+5	50.00
Cercle Brugge	(Belgium)	12 May 2025	19 June 2025	2	2	0	0	8	2	+6	100.00
Gençlerbirliği	(Turkey)	9 October 2026	Present	7	3	1	3	13	8	+5	42.86
Total				267	109	53	105	431	393	+38	40.82

== Honours ==
=== Player ===
Borussia Dortmund

- DFB-Pokal: 1988–89

=== Coach ===
Almaty

- Kazakhstan Cup runner-up: 2008
