= Stefan Studtrucker =

German footballer

Personal information
- Full name: Stefan Studtrucker
- Date of birth: 25 November 1966 (age 59)
- Place of birth: Wetter, West Germany
- Height: 1.70 m (5 ft 7 in)
- Position: Forward

Youth career
- FC Wetter
- SG Hagen-Vorhalle
- –1985: VfL Bochum

Senior career*
| Years | Team | Apps | (Gls) |
| 1984–1986 | VfL Bochum II | | |
| 1986–1988 | 1. FC Recklinghausen | | |
| 1988–1990 | SG Wattenscheid 09 | | |
| 1990–1991 | SpVgg Marl | | |
| 1991–1996 | Arminia Bielefeld | 134 | (36) |
| 1997 | KSV Hessen Kassel | | |
| 1997–1998 | VfB Lübeck | | |
| 1998–1999 | Arminia Bielefeld | 3 | (0) |
| 1999–2003 | Arminia Bielefeld II | | |
| 2003–2005 | SpVgg Steinhagen | | |
- * Club domestic league appearances and goals

Stefan Studtrucker (born 25 November 1966) is a retired German footballer who spent most of his career at Arminia Bielefeld.
