= Dominique Blanc (football administrator) =

Swiss football executive

- Born: Dominique Alfred Blanc
- Occupation: President of the Swiss Football Association

Dominique Alfred Blanc is a Swiss football official, businessman former player and former referee. In 2019, Blanc was appointed to be the President of the Swiss Football Association, an office he held until 2025, when he was succeeded by Peter Knäbel.
