= Dirk Bremser =

German footballer (born 1965)

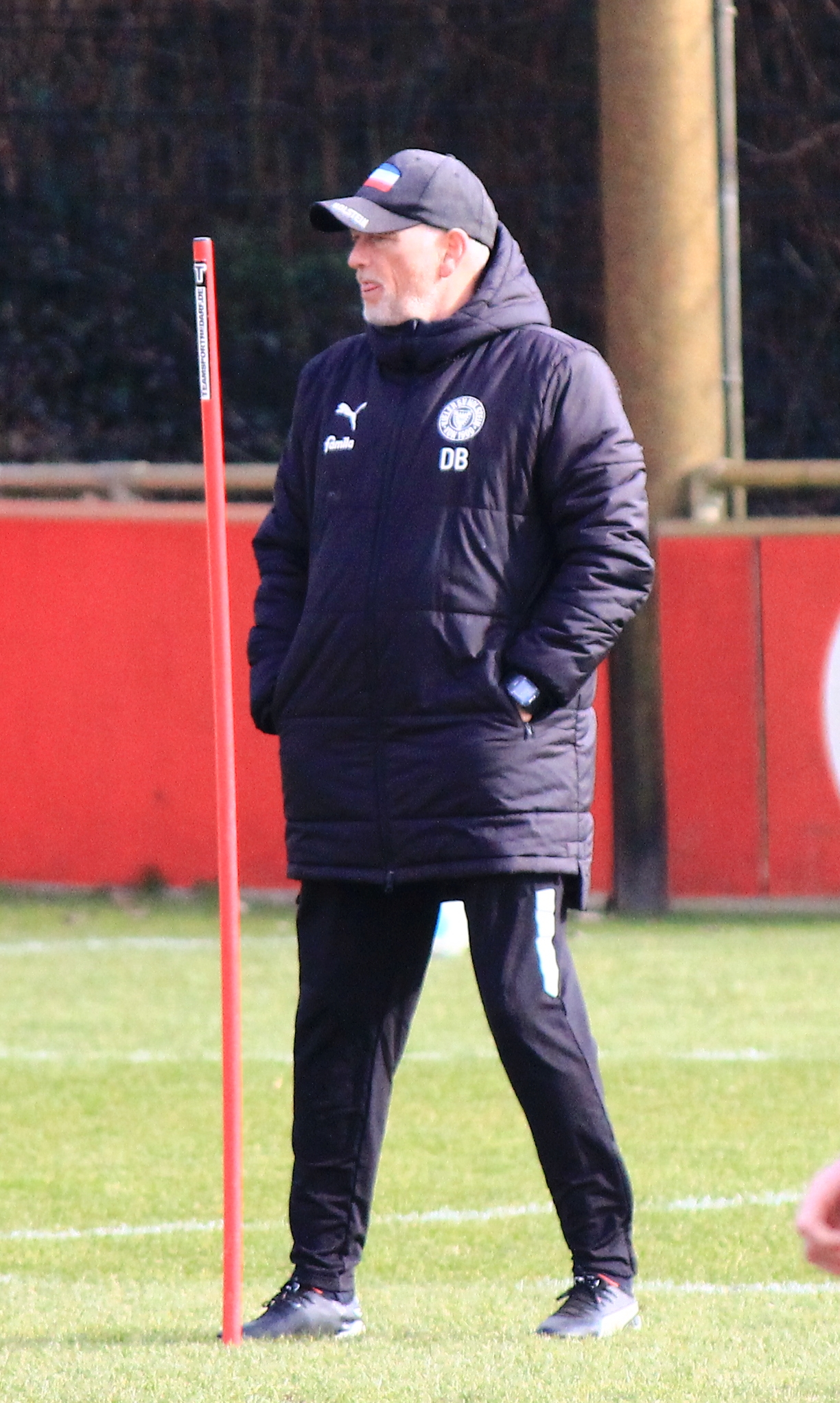
- Bremser in 2025

Personal information
- Date of birth: 1 October 1965 (age 61)
- Place of birth: Bochum, West Germany
- Height: 1.77 m (5 ft 10 in)
- Position: Midfielder

Team information
- Current team: Holstein Kiel (assistant)

Youth career
- DJK Adler Dahlhausen
- –1984: VfL Bochum

Senior career*
Years	Team	Apps	(Gls)
1984–1987	VfL Bochum II		
1986–1987	VfL Bochum	0	(0)
1988–1990	Preußen Münster		
1990–1992	MSV Duisburg	63	(6)
1992–1993	Bayer 05 Uerdingen	28	(4)
1993–1997	Hertha BSC	82	(6)
1997–1999	VfB Lübeck	54	(8)
1999–2000	Holstein Kiel	34	(8)

Managerial career
- 2000: VfB Lübeck (assistant)
- 2000–2001: VfB Lübeck
- 2001–2004: VfB Lübeck (assistant)
- 2004–2006: Alemannia Aachen (assistant)
- 2006: Alemannia Aachen
- 2006–2010: Hannover 96 (assistant)
- 2010–2012: 1. FC Nürnberg (assistant)
- 2013–2016: VfL Wolfsburg (assistant)
- 2017–2019: Borussia Mönchengladbach (assistant)
- 2019–2020: Hamburger SV (assistant)
- 2021–: Holstein Kiel (assistant)
- 2021: Holstein Kiel (caretaker)
- * Club domestic league appearances and goals

Dirk Bremser (born 1 October 1965) is a German football coach and a former player, He is the currently assistant head coach of Bundesliga club Holstein Kiel.

== Playing career ==
Bremser spent two seasons in the Bundesliga with MSV Duisburg and Bayer 05 Uerdingen.

== Coaching career ==
In the 2000–01 season, Bremser became assistant coach to Uwe Erkenbrecher at VfB Lübeck. After Erkenbrecher's dismissal in November 2000, Bremser was promoted to head coach on interim basis, until March 2001, before returning to his role as assistant coach following the appointment of Dieter Hecking. Under Hecking and Bremser, VfB were promoted to the 2. Bundesliga in 2002. After the 2003–04 season, in which they only lost in the semi-finals of the DFB-Pokal to eventual double winners Werder Bremen, Lübeck were relegated back to the Regionalliga Nord.

He and Hecking moved to 2. Bundesliga club Alemannia Aachen for the 2004–05 season. They were promoted to the Bundesliga in the 2005–06 season. Following Dieter Hecking's move to Hannover 96 in September 2006, he initially continued to work as interim manager and coached the team in the DFB-Pokal match against Chemnitzer FC. After Alemannia Aachen announced the appointment of Michael Frontzeck as Hecking's successor on 13 November 2006, Bremser left the club. From September 2006 to August 2009, Bremser worked with Hecking as assistant coach at Hannover 96, then assisted Hecking's successor Andreas Bergmann and then had to make way for the new coaching team led by Mirko Slomka on 20 January 2010.

On 7 February 2010 Bremer was announced as assistant coach of 1. FC Nürnberg, where he again assisted Hecking. On 1 January 2013 he moved to VfL Wolfsburg as assistant coach. He thus followed "his boss" Dieter Hecking once again to what was now their fifth stint together. They won the DFB-Pokal together in 2015. In October 2016, he was released from VfL Wolfsburg together with Dieter Hecking. On 4 January 2017 Bremser was introduced as the new assistant coach of Borussia Mönchengladbach, again assisting Dieter Hecking.

For the 2019–20 season, Hecking and Bremser moved to second-division club Hamburger SV in their usual constellation. They finished in 4th place and missed out on promotion back to the Bundesliga. Hecking and Bremser's contract would only have been automatically extended by one year if they had been promoted. Sports director Jonas Boldt was unable to reach an agreement with Hecking on further cooperation, so Bremser also left HSV with him. While Hecking became sports director of second division club 1. FC Nürnberg for the 2020–21 season, Bremser took a one-year break.

For the 2021–22 season, Bremser became assistant coach to Ole Werner at Holstein Kiel. After a bad start with five points from the first seven games, Werner resigned as head coach, whereupon Bremser took over the team on an interim basis. He coached the team in a 2–1 win over SC Paderborn and a 2–0 defeat to Hansa Rostock and then moved back to the assistant coach position under new head coach Marcel Rapp.

== Career statistics ==
Appearances and goals by club, season and competition
Club	Season	League			DFB-Pokal		Other		Total	
Club	Season	Division	Apps	Goals	Apps	Goals	Apps	Goals	Apps	Goals
VfL Bochum II	1983–84	Oberliga Westfalen	1	0	—		—		1	0
VfL Bochum II	1984–85	Oberliga Westfalen	27	2	2	0	—		29	2
VfL Bochum II	1985–86	Oberliga Westfalen	31	7	—		—		31	7
VfL Bochum II	1986–87	Oberliga Westfalen			—		—			
VfL Bochum II	1987–88	Oberliga Westfalen	16	3	—		—		16	3
VfL Bochum II	Total				2	0	0	0		
VfL Bochum	1986–87	Bundesliga	0	0	0	0	—		0	0
VfL Bochum	1987–88	Bundesliga	0	0	0	0	—		0	0
VfL Bochum	Total		0	0	0	0	0	0	0	0
Preußen Münster	1987–88	Oberliga Westfalen			0	0	7 (Note: Appearances in the 1987–88 Oberliga promotion play-offs.)	1		
Preußen Münster	1988–89	Oberliga Westfalen	24	2	—		8 (Note: Appearances in the 1988–89 Oberliga promotion play-offs.)	0	32	2
Preußen Münster	1989–90	2. Bundesliga	35	4	—		—		35	4
Preußen Münster	Total				0	0	15	1		
MSV Duisburg	1990–91	2. Bundesliga	36	5	6	0	—		42	5
MSV Duisburg	1991–92	Bundesliga	27	1	1	0	—		28	1
MSV Duisburg	Total		63	6	7	0	0	0	70	6
Bayer 05 Uerdingen	1992–93	Bundesliga	28	4	3	1	—		31	5
Hertha BSC	1993–94	2. Bundesliga	26	0	2	0	—		28	0
Hertha BSC	1994–95	2. Bundesliga	30	3	1	0	—		31	3
Hertha BSC	1995–96	2. Bundesliga	17	2	0	0	—		17	2
Hertha BSC	1996–97	2. Bundesliga	9	1	2	0	—		11	1
Hertha BSC	Total		82	6	5	0	0	0	87	6
VfB Lübeck	1997–98	Regionalliga Nord	31	5	2	0	—		33	5
VfB Lübeck	1998–99	Regionalliga Nord	23	3	1	0	—		24	3
VfB Lübeck	Total		54	8	3	0	0	0	57	8
Holstein Kiel	1999–00	Regionalliga Nord	34	8	—		—		34	8
Career total					20	1	15	1		
