= Jürgen Gredig =

German footballer

Personal information
- Full name: Jürgen Gredig
- Date of birth: 19 January 1966 (age 60)
- Place of birth: West Berlin, West Germany
- Position: Defender

Senior career*
Years	Team	Apps	(Gls)
–1988	Hertha Zehlendorf		
1988–1990	VfL Bochum	3	(0)
1990–1994	FC Schalke 04	5	(0)
1994–1999	LR Ahlen		
- * Club domestic league appearances and goals

Jürgen Gredig (born 19 January 1966 in West Berlin) is a retired German football defender.
