= Thorsten Bolzek =

German footballer

Personal information
- Full name: Thorsten Bolzek
- Date of birth: 7 July 1968 (age 58)
- Place of birth: West Berlin, West Germany
- Height: 1.87 m (6 ft 1 1/2 in)
- Position: Forward

Youth career
- Hertha Zehlendorf
- –1986: Blau-Weiß 90 Berlin

Senior career*
Years	Team	Apps	(Gls)
1986–1988	1. Traber FC		
1988–1989	VfL Bochum	22	(2)
1989–1991	SC Fortuna Köln	57	(21)
1991–1994	Reinickendorfer Füchse		
1994–1998	VfB Lichterfelde		
- * Club domestic league appearances and goals

Thorsten Bolzek (born 7 July 1968) is a retired German football forward.

== Career ==
=== Statistics ===
Club performance			League		Cup		Total	
Season	Club	League	Apps	Goals	Apps	Goals	Apps	Goals
West Germany			League		DFB-Pokal		Total	
1986–87	1. Traber FC	Oberliga Berlin			—			
1987–88	1. Traber FC	Oberliga Berlin			—			
1988–89	VfL Bochum	Bundesliga	22	2	2	1	24	3
1989–90	SC Fortuna Köln	2. Bundesliga	31	15	0	0	31	15
1990–91	SC Fortuna Köln	2. Bundesliga	26	6	1	0	27	6
Germany			League		DFB-Pokal		Total	
1991–92	Reinickendorfer Füchse	NOFV-Oberliga Nord			—			
1992–93	Reinickendorfer Füchse	NOFV-Oberliga Nord			—			
1993–94	Reinickendorfer Füchse	NOFV-Oberliga Nord			—			
1994–95	VfB Lichterfelde	NOFV-Oberliga Nord			—			
1995–96	VfB Lichterfelde	NOFV-Oberliga Nord			—			
1996–97	VfB Lichterfelde	NOFV-Oberliga Nord			—			
1997–98	VfB Lichterfelde	NOFV-Oberliga Nord			—			
Total	West Germany				3	1		
Total	Germany				0	0		
Career total					3	1		
