= Ole Møller Nielsen =

Danish footballer (born 1965)

Personal information
- Full name: Ole Møller Nielsen
- Date of birth: 26 November 1965 (age 60)
- Place of birth: Horsens, Denmark
- Positions: Forward; midfielder

Youth career
- –1983: Vejle Boldklub

Senior career*
Years	Team	Apps	(Gls)
1983–1986	Vejle Boldklub	65	(7)
1986	VfL Bochum	2	(0)
1987	Vejle Boldklub	5	(0)
1988	Randers Freja FC	26	(8)
1989–1992	Boldklubben 1913		(9)
1992–1997	Boldklubben 1909	50	(8)

International career
1981	Denmark U-16	4	(1)
1982–1983	Denmark U-19	5	(0)
1985–1986	Denmark U-21	4	(0)
- * Club domestic league appearances and goals

Ole Møller Nielsen (born 26 November 1965) is a Danish retired footballer.

== Statistics ==
Club performance			League		Cup		Total	
Season	Club	League	Apps	Goals	Apps	Goals	Apps	Goals
Denmark			League		Danish Cup		Total	
1983	Vejle Boldklub	1. Division	1	0				
1984	Vejle Boldklub	1. Division	14	3				
1985	Vejle Boldklub	1. Division	24	2				
1986	Vejle Boldklub	1. Division	26	2				
Germany			League		DFB-Pokal		Total	
1986–87	VfL Bochum	Bundesliga	2	0	0	0	2	0
Denmark			League		Danish Cup		Total	
1987	Vejle Boldklub	1. Division	5	0				
1988	Randers Freja FC	1. Division	26	8				
1989	Boldklubben 1913	1. Division	15	2				
1990	Boldklubben 1913	2. Division		6				
1991	Boldklubben 1913	1. Division		2				
1991–92	Boldklubben 1913	1. Division		1				
1992–93	Boldklubben 1909	Superliga	1	0				
1993–94	Boldklubben 1909	Superliga	4	0				
1994–95	Boldklubben 1909	1. Division	13	2				
1995–96	Boldklubben 1909	2. Division West	7	2				
1995–96	Boldklubben 1909	1. Division	16	3				
1996–97	Boldklubben 1909	2. Division	9	1				
Total	Denmark			34				
Total	Germany		2	0	0	0	2	0
Career total				34				
