= Meinolf Koch =

German footballer

Personal information
- Date of birth: 12 July 1957 (age 69)
- Place of birth: Bad Sassendorf, West Germany
- Height: 1.80 m (5 ft 11 in)
- Positions: Defender; midfielder

Senior career*
Years	Team	Apps	(Gls)
1979–1986	Borussia Dortmund	140	(10)

International career
1982	West Germany Olympic	1	(0)
- * Club domestic league appearances and goals

Meinolf Koch (born 12 July 1957) is a retired German football player. He spent seven seasons in the Bundesliga with Borussia Dortmund. The best league finish he achieved was sixth place.
