= Dirk Drescher =

German footballer

Personal information
- Full name: Dirk Drescher
- Date of birth: 28 February 1968 (age 58)
- Position: Goalkeeper

Youth career
- –1986: VfL Bochum

Senior career*
Years	Team	Apps	(Gls)
1985–1986	VfL Bochum	1	(0)
- * Club domestic league appearances and goals

Dirk Drescher (born 28 February 1968) is a German retired football goalkeeper.
