= 1989–90 2. Bundesliga =

16th season of the second-tier football league in Germany

2. Bundesliga
- Season: 1989–90
- Champions: Hertha BSC
- Promoted: Hertha BSC; SG Wattenscheid 09
- Relegated: Hessen Kassel; SpVgg Bayreuth; Alemannia Aachen; SpVgg Unterhaching
- Matches: 380
- Top goalscorer: Maurice Banach (21 goals)
- Average attendance: 7,398

The 1989–90 2. Bundesliga season was the sixteenth season of the 2. Bundesliga, the second tier of the German football league system.

Hertha BSC and SG Wattenscheid 09 were promoted to the Bundesliga while KSV Hessen Kassel, SpVgg Bayreuth, Alemannia Aachen and SpVgg Unterhaching were relegated to the Oberliga.

== League table ==
For the 1989–90 season KSV Hessen Kassel, SpVgg Unterhaching, MSV Duisburg and Preußen Münster were newly promoted to the 2. Bundesliga from the Oberliga while Stuttgarter Kickers and Hannover 96 had been relegated to the league from the Bundesliga.

Locations of the participating teams of the 1989–90 season

Pos	Team	Pld	W	D	L	GF	GA	GD	Pts	Promotion, qualification or relegation
1	Hertha BSC (C, P)	38	22	9	7	65	39	+26	53	Promotion to Bundesliga
2	SG Wattenscheid 09 (P)	38	21	9	8	70	35	+35	51	Promotion to Bundesliga
3	1. FC Saarbrücken	38	15	16	7	58	33	+25	46	Qualification to promotion play-offs
4	Stuttgarter Kickers	38	19	7	12	68	48	+20	45	
5	Schalke 04	38	16	11	11	69	51	+18	43	
6	Rot-Weiss Essen	38	15	12	11	53	43	+10	42	
7	Eintracht Braunschweig	38	15	9	14	55	51	+4	39	
8	Hannover 96	38	12	14	12	53	43	+10	38	
9	Blau-Weiß 90 Berlin	38	12	13	13	46	52	−6	37	
10	MSV Duisburg	38	11	15	12	50	58	−8	37	
11	SV Meppen	38	10	16	12	47	57	−10	36	
12	SC Preußen Münster	38	13	10	15	45	65	−20	36	
13	SC Freiburg	38	11	12	15	53	52	+1	34	
14	Fortuna Köln	38	9	16	13	48	60	−12	34	
15	VfL Osnabrück	38	12	9	17	58	69	−11	33	
16	SV Darmstadt 98	38	10	13	15	43	55	−12	33	
17	Hessen Kassel (R)	38	13	7	18	35	64	−29	33	Relegation to Oberliga
18	SpVgg Bayreuth (R)	38	11	9	18	54	59	−5	31	Relegation to Oberliga
19	Alemannia Aachen (R)	38	11	8	19	51	63	−12	30	Relegation to Oberliga
20	SpVgg Unterhaching (R)	38	7	15	16	43	61	−18	29	Relegation to Oberliga

Source: kicker.de
Rules for classification: 1) points; 2) goal difference; 3) number of goals scored.
(C) Champions; (P) Promoted; (R) Relegated

== Results ==
Home \ Away	AAC	BAY	BWB	BSC	EBS	D98	DUI	RWE	SCF	H96	KAS	FKO	SVM	PRM	OSN	FCS	S04	SKI	UNT	SGW
Alemannia Aachen	—	2–1	2–1	1–1	2–0	0–0	1–2	0–1	0–1	2–1	2–2	3–0	1–3	7–1	1–1	2–1	0–4	2–1	2–0	1–3
SpVgg Bayreuth	3–0	—	6–1	0–2	1–0	2–0	2–1	1–2	3–1	1–1	5–1	2–2	1–1	2–1	3–1	2–2	1–1	1–2	3–1	0–2
Blau-Weiß 90 Berlin	1–0	1–0	—	2–3	1–1	3–1	3–0	2–0	3–1	1–1	0–1	2–0	1–1	2–1	2–1	0–1	1–1	0–2	3–2	1–1
Hertha BSC	3–1	1–0	3–0	—	1–1	4–1	2–1	2–1	1–0	1–0	2–0	3–0	3–0	2–0	3–0	4–0	2–2	0–0	1–1	1–1
Eintracht Braunschweig	4–3	2–1	2–0	1–2	—	5–0	4–1	1–1	0–3	1–0	0–4	2–2	3–0	1–2	3–1	0–0	2–2	3–0	0–0	1–0
Darmstadt 98	1–0	3–1	3–0	0–0	2–2	—	3–1	2–1	2–2	1–1	0–1	2–0	3–3	1–2	1–0	0–0	3–2	0–0	1–1	4–1
MSV Duisburg	3–1	3–1	2–2	0–3	2–0	3–1	—	2–2	1–0	2–1	3–1	0–2	0–0	3–3	1–0	1–1	1–3	1–1	0–0	3–2
Rot-Weiss Essen	3–1	3–0	2–1	0–0	1–0	1–0	1–1	—	0–1	4–3	1–0	3–3	1–1	1–1	0–0	1–2	0–0	1–0	1–1	0–2
SC Freiburg	1–1	2–0	0–1	0–2	1–0	1–2	2–2	1–2	—	1–1	0–1	4–1	6–1	0–2	3–1	1–4	0–3	2–0	2–3	2–0
Hannover 96	2–0	1–1	2–0	0–2	3–0	1–1	2–2	4–1	0–0	—	4–0	1–1	1–0	2–1	1–1	0–0	2–2	5–1	3–0	0–3
Hessen Kassel	1–5	2–0	1–1	2–0	2–1	0–0	2–1	0–1	2–5	0–1	—	1–0	1–1	0–0	1–5	0–0	2–0	0–6	3–2	0–3
Fortuna Köln	0–0	5–2	1–1	3–0	0–2	2–1	1–1	1–1	1–1	2–1	0–1	—	3–0	2–5	0–2	1–1	2–1	0–1	3–2	1–1
SV Meppen	1–1	1–1	1–1	0–0	2–1	3–0	0–0	3–2	0–0	1–0	0–1	2–2	—	5–1	3–1	2–0	2–2	0–1	3–1	1–1
Preußen Münster	2–0	2–1	2–0	2–6	1–2	1–0	1–1	1–3	0–0	0–1	1–1	0–0	2–1	—	1–4	0–0	2–1	1–1	2–2	1–0
VfL Osnabrück	3–1	0–3	2–5	3–0	1–2	4–2	1–0	1–1	3–1	1–4	4–0	2–2	1–1	1–2	—	1–1	3–1	1–0	2–1	0–3
1. FC Saarbrücken	0–0	0–0	1–1	3–0	0–1	1–1	1–2	2–3	2–2	2–0	3–1	2–2	4–0	1–0	7–1	—	2–0	1–0	6–1	2–0
Schalke 04	3–1	2–1	2–0	4–1	1–5	3–0	1–1	1–0	2–1	1–1	2–0	3–0	2–0	0–1	4–1	1–2	—	2–0	3–3	1–1
Stuttgarter Kickers	4–2	3–1	1–1	4–2	4–0	2–1	4–1	4–1	1–1	3–2	2–0	1–1	5–1	4–0	2–1	1–0	2–4	—	2–0	2–3
SpVgg Unterhaching	3–2	0–0	1–1	0–1	1–1	1–0	1–1	0–2	0–0	0–0	1–0	1–2	1–3	3–0	2–2	1–1	2–1	3–1	—	1–2
SG Wattenscheid	1–2	4–1	0–0	5–1	3–1	0–0	2–0	1–0	4–4	3–0	2–0	2–0	2–0	4–0	1–1	0–2	3–1	3–0	1–0	—

Source: DFB
Legend: Blue = home team win; Yellow = draw; Red = away team win.

== Top scorers ==
The league's top scorers:

Goals	Player	Team
21	(Germany) Maurice Banach	SG Wattenscheid 09
19	(Germany) Uwe Tschiskale	SG Wattenscheid 09
18	(Germany) Heikko Glöde	VfL Osnabrück
18	(Germany) Theo Gries	Hertha BSC
18	(Germany) Wolfgang Schüler	Stuttgarter Kickers
18	(Germany) Peter Sendscheid	FC Schalke 04
17	(Ghana) Tony Yeboah	1. FC Saarbrücken
16	(Soviet Union) Aleksandr Borodyuk	FC Schalke 04
16	(Germany) Uwe Kober	MSV Duisburg
15	(Germany) Thorsten Bolzek	Fortuna Köln
