= Thomas Andersson (footballer, born 1956) =

Swedish footballer and manager

Personal information
- Full name: Thomas Olof Andersson
- Date of birth: 11 December 1956 (age 69)
- Place of birth: Katrineholm, Sweden
- Position: Forward

Youth career
- –1976: Katrineholms SK

Senior career*
Years	Team	Apps	(Gls)
1977–1979	IFK Norrköping	26	(3)
1980	Västerås SK	25	(8)
1981–1982	Vasalunds IF	45	(26)
1983	VfL Bochum	5	(0)
1983	Vasalunds IF	16	(8)
1984–1987	AIK	64	(16)
1988	Vasalunds IF	11	(3)
Total		192	(64)

Managerial career
- 2007–2016: Gefle IF (assistant + youth team)
- 2016–2017: Gefle IF
- * Club domestic league appearances and goals

Thomas Andersson (born 11 December 1956) is a Swedish football manager and former player
