= Dirk Sadowicz =

German footballer

Personal information
- Full name: Dirk Sadowicz
- Date of birth: 25 February 1965 (age 61)
- Height: 1.83 m (6 ft 0 in)
- Position: Defender

Youth career
- DJK Falkenhorst Herne

Senior career*
Years	Team	Apps	(Gls)
1987–1990	VfL Bochum II		
1988–1990	VfL Bochum	2	(0)
1990	TuS Paderborn-Neuhaus		
1991–1992	SpVgg Marl		
1992–	DSC Wanne-Eickel		
1994–1996	Holzwickeder SC		
–1998	STV Horst-Emscher		
1998–2003	SC Hassel		
2003–	SV Sodingen		
- * Club domestic league appearances and goals

Dirk Sadowicz (born 25 February 1965) is a retired German football defender.
