= Detlef Krella =

German footballer

Personal information
- Full name: Detlef Krella
- Date of birth: 4 March 1964 (age 62)
- Height: 1.78 m (5 ft 10 in)
- Position: Midfielder

Senior career*
Years	Team	Apps	(Gls)
1982–1984	VfL Bochum	23	(1)
1984	1. FC Nürnberg	7	(0)
1985–1988	Rot-Weiß Oberhausen	124	(35)
1988–1989	Kickers Offenbach	16	(0)
1989–1990	Alemannia Aachen	31	(4)
- * Club domestic league appearances and goals

Detlef Krella (born 4 March 1964) is a retired German football midfielder.
