= Stefan Pater =

German footballer (born 1960)

Personal information
- Full name: Stefan Pater
- Date of birth: 31 October 1960 (age 65)
- Height: 1.82 m (5 ft 11 1/2 in)
- Position: Forward

Senior career*
Years	Team	Apps	(Gls)
1982–1984	VfL Bochum	59	(8)
1984–1986	Arminia Bielefeld	12	(0)
- * Club domestic league appearances and goals

Stefan Pater (born 31 October 1960) is a retired German football forward.
