= Peter Jackisch =

German footballer

Personal information
- Full name: Peter Jackisch
- Date of birth: 21 November 1963 (age 62)
- Height: 1.76 m (5 ft 9 1/2 in)
- Position: Defender

Senior career*
Years	Team	Apps	(Gls)
–1984	1. FC Lennep		
1984–1987	VfB Remscheid		
1987–1989	VfL Bochum	20	(0)
1989–1990	Alemannia Aachen	10	(0)
- * Club domestic league appearances and goals

Peter Jackisch (born 21 November 1963) is a retired German football defender.
