= Andreas Bordan =

German footballer

Personal information
- Full name: Andreas Bordan
- Date of birth: 14 May 1964 (age 62)
- Position: Midfielder

Senior career*
Years	Team	Apps	(Gls)
1982–1984	VfL Bochum	3	(0)
1984–1985	SV Darmstadt 98	5	(0)
- * Club domestic league appearances and goals

Andreas Bordan (born 14 May 1964) is a retired German football midfielder.
