= Thomas Knauer =

German footballer

Personal information
- Full name: Thomas Knauer
- Date of birth: 2 February 1964 (age 62)
- Height: 1.83 m (6 ft 0 in)
- Position: Defender

Senior career*
Years	Team	Apps	(Gls)
1984–1985	VfL Bochum	0	(0)
1985–1987	Preußen Münster	72	(4)
- * Club domestic league appearances and goals

Thomas Knauer (born 2 February 1964) is a retired German football defender.
