= Detlef Mikolajczak =

German footballer

Personal information
- Full name: Detlef Mikolajczak
- Date of birth: 15 April 1964 (age 62)
- Position: Midfielder

Senior career*
Years	Team	Apps	(Gls)
1987–1988	VfL Bochum	8	(0)
- * Club domestic league appearances and goals

Detlef Mikolajczak (born 15 April 1964) is a retired German football midfielder.
