= Rudolf Decker =

German footballer

Rudi Decker
Personal information
- Full name: Rudolf Decker
- Date of birth: 13 August 1967 (age 59)
- Height: 1.73 m (5 ft 8 in)
- Position: Forward

Senior career*
Years	Team	Apps	(Gls)
1985–1986	MSV Duisburg	18	(5)
1986–1987	VfL Bochum	0	(0)
1987–1988	Rot-Weiß Oberhausen	22	(1)
- * Club domestic league appearances and goals

Rudolf Decker (born 13 August 1967) is a retired German football forward.
