= Ingo Pickenäcker =

German footballer

Personal information
- Full name: Ingo Pickenäcker
- Date of birth: 7 April 1962 (age 64)
- Place of birth: Essen, West Germany
- Height: 1.84 m (6 ft 1/2 in)
- Position: Defender

Senior career*
Years	Team	Apps	(Gls)
1980–1982	Rot-Weiss Essen	44	(0)
1982–1984	Borussia Mönchengladbach	8	(0)
1984–1985	VfL Bochum	22	(0)
1985–1988	Rot-Weiß Oberhausen	90	(6)
1988–1990	VfL Osnabrück	22	(2)
1990–1997	Rot-Weiss Essen	64	(0)
- * Club domestic league appearances and goals

Ingo Pickenäcker (born 7 April 1962) is a retired German football defender.
