= Toni Schreier =

German footballer

Personal information
- Full name: Toni Schreier
- Date of birth: 7 March 1962 (age 64)
- Position: Midfielder

Senior career*
Years	Team	Apps	(Gls)
1984–1986	VfL Bochum	21	(1)
- * Club domestic league appearances and goals

Toni Schreier (born 7 March 1962) is a retired German football midfielder.
