= Jürgen Wielert =

German footballer

Personal information
- Full name: Jürgen Wielert
- Date of birth: 5 July 1960 (age 66)
- Position: Midfielder

Senior career*
| Years | Team | Apps | (Gls) |
| 1979–1985 | DSC Wanne-Eickel | | |
| 1985–1987 | VfL Bochum | 18 | (1) |
| 1987–1988 | Rot-Weiß Oberhausen | 35 | (2) |
- * Club domestic league appearances and goals

Jürgen Wielert (born 5 July 1960) is a retired German football midfielder.
