= Dirk Riechmann =

German footballer

Personal information
- Full name: Dirk Riechmann
- Date of birth: 12 May 1965 (age 61)
- Place of birth: Bochum, West Germany
- Height: 1.82 m (5 ft 11 1/2 in)
- Position: Midfielder

Senior career*
Years	Team	Apps	(Gls)
–1989	VfL Bochum II		
1987–1989	VfL Bochum	6	(2)
1989–1991	SC Preußen Münster	37	(2)
1991–1993	SpVgg Marl		
1993–1998	SpVgg Erkenschwick		
1999–2003	Wuppertaler SV		
2003–2005	TuRU Düsseldorf		
2005–2008	TuRa Rüdinghausen		
- * Club domestic league appearances and goals

Dirk Riechmann (born 12 May 1965) is a German former football midfielder.
