= Markus Croonen =

German footballer

Personal information
- Full name: Markus Croonen
- Date of birth: 19 March 1964 (age 62)
- Position: Goalkeeper

Youth career
- –1978: MSV Duisburg
- 1978–1983: VfL Bochum

Senior career*
Years	Team	Apps	(Gls)
1983–1986	VfL Bochum II		
1984–1986	VfL Bochum	4	(0)
1986–1987	SC Preußen Münster		
1987–1989	SC Hassel		
1989–1992	SpVgg Bad Homburg		
1992–1993	FSV Frankfurt		
1993–1994	SV Wiesbaden		
1994–1996	SG Egelsbach		
- * Club domestic league appearances and goals

Markus Croonen is a retired German football goalkeeper.
