= Heinz Knüwe =

German footballer (born 1956)

Personal information
- Full name: Heinz Knüwe
- Date of birth: 16 January 1956 (age 70)
- Place of birth: Wadersloh, West Germany
- Height: 1.81 m (5 ft 11 in)
- Position: Defender

Youth career
- 1964–1972: SV Westfalen Liesborn
- 1972–1974: VfL Geseke

Senior career*
Years	Team	Apps	(Gls)
1974–1975	1860 Munich	0	(0)
1975–1976	Borussia Lippstadt		
1976–1979	SC Herford		
1979–1986	VfL Bochum	197	(19)
1986–1988	Hannover 96	46	(1)
1988–1990	SC Verl		
- * Club domestic league appearances and goals

Heinz Knüwe (born 16 January 1956) is a German retired professional footballer who played as a defender.

== Career statistics ==
Appearances and goals by club, season and competition
Club	Season	League			DFB-Pokal		Total	
Club	Season	Division	Apps	Goals	Apps	Goals	Apps	Goals
1860 Munich	1974–75	2. Bundesliga	0	0	0	0	0	0
Borussia Lippstadt	1975–76	Landesliga Westfalen			—			
SC Herford	1976–77	2. Bundesliga	36	5	—		36	5
SC Herford	1977–78	2. Bundesliga	25	1	0	0	25	1
SC Herford	1978–79	Oberliga Westfalen			2	0		
VfL Bochum	1979–80	Bundesliga	32	4	4	0	36	4
VfL Bochum	1980–81	Bundesliga	25	3	3	0	28	3
VfL Bochum	1981–82	Bundesliga	28	3	3	0	31	3
VfL Bochum	1982–83	Bundesliga	33	5	5	3	38	8
VfL Bochum	1983–84	Bundesliga	33	2	1	0	34	2
VfL Bochum	1984–85	Bundesliga	29	2	3	0	32	2
VfL Bochum	1985–86	Bundesliga	17	0	1	0	18	0
Hannover 96	1986–87	2. Bundesliga	33	1	4	0	37	1
Hannover 96	1987–88	Bundesliga	13	0	0	0	13	0
SC Verl	1988–89	Oberliga Westfalen			—			
SC Verl	1989–90	Oberliga Westfalen			—			
Career total					26	3		
