= Andreas Lübke =

German footballer

Personal information
- Full name: Andreas Lübke
- Date of birth: 12 March 1967 (age 59)
- Position: Forward

Senior career*
Years	Team	Apps	(Gls)
1982–1983	Stuttgarter Kickers		
1986–1988	VfL Bochum	8	(1)
- * Club domestic league appearances and goals

Andreas Lübke (born 12 March 1967) is a retired German football forward.
