= Volker Knappheide =

German footballer

Personal information
- Full name: Volker Knappheide
- Date of birth: 28 March 1966 (age 60)
- Place of birth: Essen, West Germany
- Position: Midfielder

Youth career
- –1984: Schwarz-Weiss Essen

Senior career*
Years	Team	Apps	(Gls)
1984–1985	Schwarz-Weiss Essen		
1985–1987	VfL Bochum	7	(1)
- * Club domestic league appearances and goals

Volker Knappheide (born 28 March 1966) is a retired German football midfielder.
