= Michael Kühn =

German footballer

Personal information
- Full name: Michael Kühn
- Date of birth: 6 May 1963 (age 63)
- Place of birth: Bochum, West Germany
- Height: 1.84 m (6 ft 1/2 in)
- Position: Midfielder

Youth career
- –1980: VfL Bochum

Senior career*
Years	Team	Apps	(Gls)
1980–1981	VfL Bochum II		
1981–1987	VfL Bochum	73	(8)
1987–1988	BVL Remscheid	35	(2)
- * Club domestic league appearances and goals

Michael Kühn (born 6 May 1963) is a retired German football midfielder.
