= Peter Knäbel =

German footballer

Personal information
- Date of birth: 2 October 1966 (age 60)
- Place of birth: Witten, West Germany
- Height: 1.77 m (5 ft 10 in)
- Position: Midfielder

Youth career
- Borussia Dortmund

Senior career*
Years	Team	Apps	(Gls)
1984–1985	VfL Bochum II		
1984–1988	VfL Bochum	38	(5)
1988–1993	FC St. Pauli	131	(7)
1993–1994	1. FC Saarbrücken	19	(3)
1994–1995	1860 Munich	2	(0)
1995	→ St. Gallen (loan)		
1995–1998	1. FC Nürnberg	65	(5)
1998–2000	FC Winterthur		

Managerial career
- 1995–1998: 1. FC Nürnberg (youth)
- 1998–2000: FC Winterthur (playing manager)
- 2015: Hamburger SV (caretaker)
- * Club domestic league appearances and goals

Peter Knäbel (born 2 October 1966) is a German football manager and former player that has served as the president of the Swiss Football Association since 2025.

== Coaching and managerial career ==
Knäbel was head coach of Nationalliga B side FC Winterthur until 2000.

He also is an expert for Swiss TV's football coverage.

Knäbel was the Sporting Director of Hamburger SV. He also became the interim head coach of the club on 22 March 2015 after Josef Zinnbauer was sacked. He became the 19th head coach of Hamburg since 2000. In his debut, on 4 April 2015, Hamburg lost to Bayer Leverkusen 4–0. In the second match, on 11 April 2015, Hamburg lost to VfL Wolfsburg 2–0 and dropped down into the relegation zone. He was replaced on 15 April 2015 by Bruno Labbadia. He had lost both matches as head coach and failed to score in either match.

On 15 April 2018, Knäbel was appointed Technical Director of the youth football academy of FC Schalke 04.

On 1 August 2025, Knäbel was named president of the Swiss Football Association, succeeding Dominique Blanc.

== Coaching record ==
As of 11 April 2015

Team	From	To	Record								
Team	From	To	M	W	D	L	GF	GA	GD	Win %	Ref.
Hamburger SV	22 March 2015	15 April 2015	2	0	0	2	0	6	−6	0.00	

== Honours ==
- DFB-Pokal finalist: 1987–88
