= Frank Benatelli =

German footballer (born 1962)

Personal information
- Date of birth: 19 August 1962 (age 64)
- Place of birth: Bochum, West Germany
- Height: 1.82 m (6 ft 0 in)
- Position: Midfielder

Youth career
- SV Waldesrand Linden
- SV Westfalia Weitmar 09
- –1981: VfL Bochum

Senior career*
Years	Team	Apps	(Gls)
1981–1983	VfL Bochum II		
1983–1992	VfL Bochum	192	(13)

Managerial career
- SV Sodingen
- Hasper SV
- Blau Weiss Post Recklinghausen
- 2000–2004: Schwarz-Weiss Essen
- 2005: SSV Hagen
- 2006–2008: TuRU Düsseldorf
- 2010–: CSV SF Bochum-Linden
- * Club domestic league appearances and goals

Frank Benatelli (born 19 August 1962) is a German football coach and a retired player.

== Career ==
Born and raised in Bochum, Benatelli played in his youth for the local clubs SV Waldesrand Linden and SV Westfalia Weitmar 09. Still during his youth career, he joined local heavyweights VfL Bochum, where he made it into the first team and spent his entire senior career.

He had to retire at the age of only 28 due to an injury of his patellar ligament which resulted in a limited capacity of his knee.

== Personal life ==
He is the son of a German mother and an Italian father, Egidio, who hails from Caorle close to Venice. He himself has two children, a daughter, Laura, and a son, Rico, who is also a professional footballer.

== Career statistics ==
Appearances and goals by club, season and competition
Club	Season	League			DFB-Pokal		Total	
Club	Season	Division	Apps	Goals	Apps	Goals	Apps	Goals
VfL Bochum II	1981–82	Verbandsliga Westfalen			—			
VfL Bochum II	1982–83	Oberliga Westfalen			—			
VfL Bochum II	Total				0	0		
VfL Bochum	1982–83	Bundesliga	8	0	0	0	8	0
VfL Bochum	1983–84	Bundesliga	15	1	0	0	15	1
VfL Bochum	1984–85	Bundesliga	15	4	0	0	15	4
VfL Bochum	1985–86	Bundesliga	27	4	5	1	32	5
VfL Bochum	1986–87	Bundesliga	30	1	0	0	30	1
VfL Bochum	1987–88	Bundesliga	15	0	5	0	20	0
VfL Bochum	1988–89	Bundesliga	30	0	2	0	32	0
VfL Bochum	1989–90	Bundesliga	28	1	2	0	30	1
VfL Bochum	1990–91	Bundesliga	5	0	0	0	5	0
VfL Bochum	1991–92	Bundesliga	19	2	0	0	19	2
VfL Bochum	Total		192	13	14	1	206	14
Career total			192	13	14	1	206	14

== Honours ==
VfL Bochum

- DFB-Pokal finalist: 1987–88
