= 1980–81 VfL Bochum season =

VfL Bochum
1980–81 season
- President: Ottokar Wüst
- Head Coach: Helmuth Johannsen
- Stadium: Ruhrstadion
- Bundesliga: 9th
- DFB-Pokal: Fourth Round
- Intertoto Cup: Group stage
- Top goalscorer: League: Pinkall (17); All: Pinkall (22)
- Highest home attendance: 42,000 (vs FC Bayern Munich, 4 April 1981)
- Lowest home attendance: 8,353 (vs VfB Stuttgart, 6 June 1981)
- Average home league attendance: 22,050
Home colours	Away colours

The 1980–81 VfL Bochum season was the 43rd season in club history.

== Matches ==
=== Legend ===
Win Draw Loss

=== Bundesliga ===
16 August 1980 1	TSV 1860 Munich	2 – 2	VfL Bochum	Munich
15:30	Klinkhammer 77'; Raubold 82'		Pinkall 50'; Oswald 85'	Stadium: Olympiastadion; Attendance: 22,000; Referee: Volker Roth (Salzgitter)

20 August 1980 2	VfL Bochum	0 – 0	Karlsruher SC	Bochum
19:30				Stadium: Ruhrstadion; Attendance: 20,000; Referee: Peter Gabor (West Berlin)

23 August 1980 3	VfL Bochum	1 – 1	MSV Duisburg	Bochum
15:30	Abel 59'		Fruck 86'	Stadium: Ruhrstadion; Attendance: 15,000; Referee: Karl-Heinz Tritschler (Freiburg)

3 September 1980 4	1. FC Nürnberg	0 – 2	VfL Bochum	Nuremberg
20:00			Pinkall 20'; Bast 69'	Stadium: Städtisches Stadion; Attendance: 45,000; Referee: Helmut Treib (Wadgassen)

5 September 1980 5	VfL Bochum	0 – 0	1. FC Kaiserslautern	Bochum
19:30				Stadium: Ruhrstadion; Attendance: 20,000; Referee: Norbert Brückner (West Berlin)

13 September 1980 6	1. FC Köln	2 – 2	VfL Bochum	Cologne
15:30	Littbarski 42'; Müller 59'		Blau 35'; Kaczor 66'	Stadium: Radrennbahn Müngersdorf; Attendance: 10,000; Referee: Klaus Clajus (Karlsruhe)

20 September 1980 7	VfL Bochum	2 – 0	Eintracht Frankfurt	Bochum
15:30	Gross 50'; Abel 57' (pen.)			Stadium: Ruhrstadion; Attendance: 26,000; Referee: Friedrich Retzmann (Pinneberg)

26 September 1980 8	Borussia Mönchengladbach	2 – 1	VfL Bochum	Mönchengladbach
20:00	Matthäus 43'; Bruns 70'		Abel 52' (pen.)	Stadium: Bökelbergstadion; Attendance: 17,000; Referee: Heinz Aldinger (Waiblingen)

15 October 1980 9	VfL Bochum	2 – 2	Bayer 05 Uerdingen	Bochum
20:00	Pinkall 4', 90'		Eggeling 17'; Hahn 73'	Stadium: Ruhrstadion; Attendance: 12,000; Referee: Franz-Josef Hontheim (Trier)

18 October 1980 10	FC Bayern Munich	3 – 1	VfL Bochum	Munich
15:30	Rummenigge 3', 22'; Dürnberger 29'		Knüwe 84'	Stadium: Olympiastadion; Attendance: 8,000; Referee: Werner Föckler (Weisenheim am Sand)

25 October 1980 11	VfL Bochum	0 – 2	Borussia Dortmund	Bochum
15:30			Burgsmüller 14'; Abramczik 29'	Stadium: Ruhrstadion; Attendance: 35,000; Referee: Gerd Hennig (Duisburg)

29 October 1980 12	Fortuna Düsseldorf	1 – 1	VfL Bochum	Düsseldorf
20:00	Weikl 8'		Abel 9'	Stadium: Rheinstadion; Attendance: 8,000; Referee: Aron Schmidhuber (Ottobrunn)

11 November 1980 13	VfL Bochum	5 – 1	FC Schalke 04	Bochum
20:00	Woelk 20'; Pinkall 30', 79'; Bast 39', 66'		Jara 45'	Stadium: Ruhrstadion; Attendance: 32,000; Referee: Wilfried Heitmann (Drentwede)

15 November 1980 14	Arminia Bielefeld	3 – 3	VfL Bochum	Bielefeld
15:30	Angele 51'; Schock 71'; Eilenfeldt 89'		Pinkall 41', 75'; Abel 68'	Stadium: Alm; Attendance: 10,000; Referee: Dieter Pauly (Rheydt)

28 November 1980 15	VfL Bochum	1 – 1	Bayer 04 Leverkusen	Bochum
20:00	Knüwe 67'		Demuth 25'	Stadium: Ruhrstadion; Attendance: 16,000; Referee: Max Klauser (Munich)

6 December 1980 16	VfB Stuttgart	4 – 1	VfL Bochum	Stuttgart
15:30	Tüfekci 15', 41', 58'; Allgöwer 56'		Lameck 31'	Stadium: Neckarstadion; Attendance: 13,600; Referee: Uwe Kasperowski (West Berlin)

13 December 1980 17	VfL Bochum	0 – 3	Hamburger SV	Bochum
15:30			Hrubesch 75'; Reimann 82'; Hartwig 85'	Stadium: Ruhrstadion; Attendance: 35,000; Referee: Dieter Niebergall (Ramsbach)

27 January 1981 18	VfL Bochum	4 – 1	TSV 1860 Munich	Bochum
20:00	Tenhagen 60'; Pinkall 77', 81'; Bast 86'		Sidka 9'	Stadium: Ruhrstadion; Attendance: 14,500; Referee: Klaus Ohmsen (Hamburg)

24 January 1981 19	Karlsruher SC	0 – 0	VfL Bochum	Karlsruhe
15:30				Stadium: Wildparkstadion; Attendance: 18,000; Referee: Medardus Luca (Völklingen)

7 February 1981 20	MSV Duisburg	0 – 3	VfL Bochum	Duisburg
15:30			Gross 43'; Pinkall 47'; Blau 89'	Stadium: Wedaustadion; Attendance: 15,000; Referee: Peter Gabor (West Berlin)

14 February 1981 21	VfL Bochum	4 – 0	1. FC Nürnberg	Bochum
15:30	Gross 20', 74'; Blau 66'; Pinkall 85'			Stadium: Ruhrstadion; Attendance: 16,000; Referee: Walter Engel (Reimsbach)

24 March 1981 22	1. FC Kaiserslautern	0 – 0	VfL Bochum	Kaiserslautern
20:00				Stadium: Betzenbergstadion; Attendance: 18,329; Referee: Karl-Heinz Tritschler (Freiburg)

7 March 1981 23	VfL Bochum	1 – 1	1. FC Köln	Bochum
15:30	Blau 76'		Woodcock 53'	Stadium: Ruhrstadion; Attendance: 20,000

14 March 1981 24	Eintracht Frankfurt	2 – 2	VfL Bochum	Frankfurt am Main
15:30	Cha 5'; Pezzey 34'		Pinkall 27', 46'	Stadium: Waldstadion; Attendance: 12,000; Referee: Walter Horstmann (Hildesheim)

21 March 1981 25	VfL Bochum	1 – 1	Borussia Mönchengladbach	Bochum
15:30	Blau 3'		Schäfer 80'	Stadium: Ruhrstadion; Attendance: 25,000; Referee: Werner Ross (Ingolstadt)

27 March 1981 26	Bayer 05 Uerdingen	1 – 0	VfL Bochum	Krefeld
20:00	Eggeling 81'			Stadium: Grotenburg-Stadion; Attendance: 12,000; Referee: Jürgen Meßmer (Mannheim)

4 April 1981 27	VfL Bochum	1 – 3	FC Bayern Munich	Bochum
15:30	Abel 4'		Breitner 11' (pen.); Horsmann 70'; Rummenigge 74'	Stadium: Ruhrstadion; Attendance: 42,000; Referee: Franz-Josef Hontheim (Trier)

10 April 1981 28	Borussia Dortmund	1 – 3	VfL Bochum	Dortmund
20:00	Abramczik 80'		Pinkall 45'; Abel 61'; Bast 35'	Stadium: Westfalenstadion; Attendance: 40,000; Referee: Rainer Waltert (Paderborn)

16 April 1981 29	VfL Bochum	2 – 1	Fortuna Düsseldorf	Bochum
20:00	Žugčić 40'; Knüwe 62'		Bommer 14'	Stadium: Ruhrstadion; Attendance: 18,000; Referee: Horst Joos (Stuttgart)

9 May 1981 30	FC Schalke 04	0 – 6	VfL Bochum	Gelsenkirchen
15:30			Blau 18'; Woelk 43'; Pinkall 59', 76'; Abel 79', 87'	Stadium: Parkstadion; Attendance: 38,000; Referee: Max Klauser (Munich)

16 May 1981 31	VfL Bochum	0 – 2	Arminia Bielefeld	Bochum
15:30			Schock 8'; Geils 47'	Stadium: Ruhrstadion; Attendance: 20,000; Referee: Heinz Aldinger (Waiblingen)

29 May 1981 32	Bayer 04 Leverkusen	2 – 0	VfL Bochum	Leverkusen
20:00	Klimke 22'; Økland 69'			Stadium: Ulrich-Haberland-Stadion; Attendance: 8,000; Referee: Eberhard Schmoock (Reichenau)

6 June 1981 33	VfL Bochum	1 – 1	VfB Stuttgart	Bochum
15:30	Tüfekci 15'		Abel 75'	Stadium: Ruhrstadion; Attendance: 8,353; Referee: Uwe Kasperowski (West Berlin)

13 June 1981 34	Hamburger SV	2 – 1	VfL Bochum	Hamburg
15:30	Schröder 82'; Hartwig 85'		Abel 45'	Stadium: Volksparkstadion; Attendance: 19,000; Referee: Norbert Brückner (West Berlin)

=== DFB-Pokal ===
30 August 1980 R1	VfL Bochum	4 – 1	SV Wilhelmshaven	Bochum
	Gross 37'; Pinkall 50', 51'; Lameck 58'		Janßen 66'	Stadium: Ruhrstadion; Attendance: 3,000; Referee: Jakob Wippker (Aachen)

4 October 1980 R2	VfL Bochum	5 – 1	Rot-Weiss Essen	Bochum
	Oswald 46'; Pinkall 53'; Abel 55'; Woelk 74'; Bast 80'		Mill 67'	Stadium: Ruhrstadion; Attendance: 12,000; Referee: Dieter Stäglich (Bonn)

22 November 1980 R3	FSV Frankfurt	1 – 2	VfL Bochum	Frankfurt am Main
	Luy 9' (pen.)		Abel 35', 89' (pen.)	Stadium: Stadion am Bornheimer Hang; Attendance: 8,000; Referee: Heinz Aldinger (Waiblingen)

31 January 1981 R4	Hamburger SV	4 – 1	VfL Bochum	Hamburg
	Buljan 23'; Hrubesch 40', 90'; Milewski 86'		Gross 79'	Stadium: Volksparkstadion; Attendance: 9,300; Referee: Volker Roth (Salzgitter)

=== Intertoto Cup ===
26 June 1980 GS1	PFC Slavia Sofia (Bulgaria)	2 – 0	VfL Bochum
				Attendance: 3,000

5 July 1980 GS2	FK Napredak Kruševac (Socialist Federal Republic of Yugoslavia)	2 – 0	VfL Bochum
	Kostić			Attendance: 5,000

12 July 1980 GS3	VfL Bochum	2 – 1	(Sweden) IF Elfsborg
	Lemke 11'; Jakobs 19'		Larsson 18'	Attendance: 2,300

19 July 1980 GS4	VfL Bochum	4 – 1	(Bulgaria) PFC Slavia Sofia
	Gross 17', 87'; Pinkall 20'; Bast 36'		Tsvetkov 38'	Attendance: 2,000

26 July 1980 GS5	VfL Bochum	2 – 1	(Socialist Federal Republic of Yugoslavia) FK Napredak Kruševac
	Pinkall 16'; Abel 78'		Čop 68'	Attendance: 4,000

2 August 1980 GS6	IF Elfsborg (Sweden)	1 – 0	VfL Bochum
	Svensson 70'			Attendance: 1,000

== Squad ==
=== Squad and statistics ===
==== Squad, appearances and goals scored ====
No.	Pos	Nat	Player	Total		Bundesliga		DFB-Pokal		Intertoto Cup	
No.	Pos	Nat	Player	Apps	Goals	Apps	Goals	Apps	Goals	Apps	Goals
	FW	(West Germany) FRG	Hans-Joachim Abel	37	14	33	11	4	3		
	MF	(West Germany) FRG	Dieter Bast	37	6	34	5	3	1		
	MF	(West Germany) FRG	Rolf Blau	35	6	32	6	3	0		
	DF	(West Germany) FRG	Hermann Gerland	19	0	17	0	2	0		
	MF	(Switzerland) SUI	Christian Gross	30	6	26	4	4	2		
	DF	(West Germany) FRG	Michael Jakobs	31	0	27	0	4	0		
	FW	(West Germany) FRG	Josef Kaczor	10	1	9	1	1	0		
	MF	(West Germany) FRG	Heinz Knüwe	28	3	25	3	3	0		
	DF	(West Germany) FRG	Michael Lameck	38	2	34	1	4	1		
	FW	(West Germany) FRG	Dieter Lemke	11	0	9	0	2	0		
	GK	(West Germany) FRG	Reinhard Mager	37	0	34	0	3	0		
	MF	(West Germany) FRG	Walter Oswald	20	2	16	1	4	1		
	FW	(West Germany) FRG	Kurt Pinkall	36	20	32	17	4	3		
	GK	(West Germany) FRG	Werner Scholz	2	0	1	0	1	0		
	DF	(West Germany) FRG	Franz-Josef Tenhagen	25	1	23	1	2	0		
	DF	(West Germany) FRG	Lothar Woelk	36	3	32	2	4	1		
	DF	(Socialist Federal Republic of Yugoslavia) YUG	Ivan Žugčić	19	1	16	1	3	0		

=== Transfers ===
==== Summer ====
In:

No.	Pos.	Nation	Player
—	MF	SUI	Christian Gross (from Neuchâtel Xamax)
—	DF	FRG	Michael Jakobs (from SG Wattenscheid 09)
—	FW	FRG	Dieter Lemke (from BSV Menden)
—	DF	YUG	Ivan Žugčić (from SG Wattenscheid 09)

Out:

No.	Pos.	Nation	Player
—	DF	FRG	Ulrich Bittorf (to SC Herford)
—	MF	YUG	Luka Bonačić (to CD Málaga)
—	MF	FRG	Michael Eggert (to 1. FC Nürnberg)
—	DF	FRG	Klaus Franke (retired)
—	DF	FRG	Detlef Jaskowiak (to 1. FC Bocholt)
—	MF	FRG	Hans-Jürgen Köper (retired)
—	FW	FRG	Werner Schachten (released)
—	FW	FRG	Ottmar Scheuch (released)
