= 1981–82 VfL Bochum season =

VfL Bochum
1981–82 season
- President: Ottokar Wüst
- Head Coach: Rolf Schafstall
- Stadium: Ruhrstadion
- Bundesliga: 10th
- DFB-Pokal: Semifinals
- Top goalscorer: League: Wolfgang Patzke (13); All: Wolfgang Patzke (14)
- Highest home attendance: 35,000 (vs 1. FC Köln, 22 August 1981; Hamburger SV, 19 September 1981)
- Lowest home attendance: 6,000 (vs Arminia Bielefeld, 15 May 1982)
- Average home league attendance: 17,706
Home colours	Away colours

The 1981–82 season was the 44th season in the history of VfL Bochum.

== Matches ==
=== Legend ===
Win Draw Loss

=== Bundesliga ===
8 August 1981 1	VfL Bochum	2 – 0	1. FC Nürnberg	Bochum
15:30	Patzke 35'; Lemke 84'			Stadium: Ruhrstadion; Attendance: 13,000; Referee: Günter Linn (Altendiez)

14 August 1981 2	Bayer 04 Leverkusen	0 – 3	VfL Bochum	Leverkusen
20:00			Abel 29' (pen.), 64'; Bast 88'	Stadium: Ulrich-Haberland-Stadion; Attendance: 10,000; Referee: Norbert Brückner (West Berlin)

22 August 1981 3	VfL Bochum	3 – 1	1. FC Köln	Bochum
15:30	Blau 11'; Oswald 29'; Abel 66'		Allofs 43'	Stadium: Ruhrstadion; Attendance: 35,000; Referee: Aron Schmidhuber (Ottobrunn)

26 August 1981 4	SV Darmstadt 98	2 – 0	VfL Bochum	Darmstadt
20:00	Hahn 62'; Mattern 88' (pen.)			Stadium: Stadion am Böllenfalltor; Attendance: 16,000; Referee: Peter Gabor (West Berlin)

5 September 1981 5	VfL Bochum	3 – 2	Eintracht Frankfurt	Bochum
15:30	Bittorf 9', 86'; Patzke 45'		Pezzey 16'; Anthes 90'	Stadium: Ruhrstadion; Attendance: 22,000; Referee: Dieter Niebergall (Ramsbach)

11 September 1981 6	SV Werder Bremen	3 – 1	VfL Bochum	Bremen
20:00	Kostedde 8'; Reinders 12'; Meier 72'		Schreier 80'	Stadium: Weserstadion; Attendance: 24,000; Referee: Peter Correll (Heilbronn)

19 September 1981 7	VfL Bochum	2 – 1	Hamburger SV	Bochum
15:30	Lameck 40'; Abel 71' (pen.)		Hrubesch 19'	Stadium: Ruhrstadion; Attendance: 35,000; Referee: Werner Föckler (Bad Dürkheim)

26 September 1981 8	Fortuna Düsseldorf	2 – 1	VfL Bochum	Düsseldorf
15:30	Weikl 50'; Allofs 66'		Abel 40' (pen.)	Stadium: Rheinstadion; Attendance: 11,500; Referee: Walter Eschweiler (Bonn)

2 October 1981 9	VfL Bochum	2 – 2	MSV Duisburg	Bochum
20:00	Patzke 7'; Woelk 42'		Saborowski 46'; Kempe 60'	Stadium: Ruhrstadion; Attendance: 18,000; Referee: Karl-Josef Assenmacher (Fischenich)

16 October 1981 10	Karlsruher SC	2 – 2	VfL Bochum	Karlsruhe
20:00	Groß 33'; Boysen 53'		Schreier 70'; Abel 80'	Stadium: Wildparkstadion; Attendance: 16,000; Referee: Franz-Josef Hontheim (Trier)

24 October 1981 11	VfL Bochum	3 – 3	VfB Stuttgart	Bochum
15:30	Oswald 14'; Schreier 46'; Abel 57' (pen.)		Beck 45'; Müller 51'; Six 61'	Stadium: Ruhrstadion; Attendance: 20,000; Referee: Walter Horstmann (Hildesheim)

31 October 1981 12	Eintracht Braunschweig	2 – 1	VfL Bochum	Braunschweig
15:30	Lux 38'; Grobe 41' (pen.)		Schreier 35'	Stadium: Eintracht-Stadion; Attendance: 16,000; Referee: Jürgen Meßmer (Mannheim)

7 November 1981 13	VfL Bochum	1 – 1	Borussia Mönchengladbach	Bochum
15:30	Pinkall 5'		Schreier 76'	Stadium: Ruhrstadion; Attendance: 30,000; Referee: Norbert Brückner (West Berlin)

13 November 1981 14	1. FC Kaiserslautern	3 – 3	VfL Bochum	Kaiserslautern
20:00	Funkel 2'; Hofeditz 6'; Neues 43'		Schreier 19'; Patzke 33'; Abel 83'	Stadium: Betzenbergstadion; Attendance: 15,848; Referee: Volker Roth (Salzgitter)

12 January 1982 15	Arminia Bielefeld	2 – 0	VfL Bochum	Bielefeld
20:00	Geils 7'; Dronia 90+2'			Stadium: Alm; Attendance: 12,000; Referee: Gerd Hennig (Duisburg)

12 December 1981 16	VfL Bochum	0 – 0	Borussia Dortmund	Bochum
15:30				Stadium: Ruhrstadion; Attendance: 30,000; Referee: Dieter Pauly (Rheydt)

19 December 1981 17	FC Bayern Munich	1 – 0	VfL Bochum	Munich
15:30	Horsmann 76'			Stadium: Olympiastadion; Attendance: 4,000; Referee: Uwe Kasperowski (West Berlin)

16 January 1982 18	1. FC Nürnberg	2 – 1	VfL Bochum	Nuremberg
15:30	Weyerich 27'; Heidenreich 51'		Blau 43'	Stadium: Städtisches Stadion; Attendance: 12,000; Referee: Karl-Heinz Tritschler (Freiburg)

20 March 1982 19	VfL Bochum	3 – 1	Bayer 04 Leverkusen	Bochum
15:30	Patzke 23'; Abel 32' (pen.); Bittorf 65'		Hermann 57'	Stadium: Ruhrstadion; Attendance: 10,000; Referee: Wolf-Dieter Ahlenfelder (Oberhausen)

30 January 1982 20	1. FC Köln	1 – 0	VfL Bochum	Cologne
15:30	Littbarski 75'			Stadium: Radrennbahn Müngersdorf; Attendance: 18,000; Referee: Peter Gabor (West Berlin)

6 February 1982 21	VfL Bochum	1 – 0	SV Darmstadt 98	Bochum
15:30	Patzke 16'			Stadium: Ruhrstadion; Attendance: 9,000; Referee: Udo Horeis (Hamburg)

13 February 1982 22	Eintracht Frankfurt	0 – 1	VfL Bochum	Frankfurt am Main
15:30			Schreier 31'	Stadium: Waldstadion; Attendance: 12,000; Referee: Medardus Luca (Völklingen)

27 February 1982 23	VfL Bochum	0 – 2	SV Werder Bremen	Bochum
15:30			Kostedde 75'; Reinders 87'	Stadium: Ruhrstadion; Attendance: 15,000; Referee: Peter Correll (Heilbronn)

6 March 1982 24	Hamburger SV	2 – 2	VfL Bochum	Hamburg
15:30	von Heesen 23'; Kaltz 67' (pen.)		Oswald 81'; Schreier 85'	Stadium: Volksparkstadion; Attendance: 17,500; Referee: Siegfried Brehm (Kemmern)

13 March 1982 25	VfL Bochum	3 – 0	Fortuna Düsseldorf	Bochum
15:30	Patzke 45'; Oswald 46'; Schreier 69'			Stadium: Ruhrstadion; Attendance: 15,000; Referee: Winfried Walz (Waiblingen)

27 March 1982 26	MSV Duisburg	1 – 0	VfL Bochum	Duisburg
15:30	Saborowski 22'			Stadium: Wedaustadion; Attendance: 15,000; Referee: Aron Schmidhuber (Ottobrunn)

2 April 1982 27	VfL Bochum	3 – 1	Karlsruher SC	Bochum
20:00	Abel 30'; Knüwe 42'; Bast 90' (pen.)		Becker 43'	Stadium: Ruhrstadion; Attendance: 10,000; Referee: Volker Huster (Lahnstein)

17 April 1982 28	VfB Stuttgart	3 – 0	VfL Bochum	Stuttgart
15:30	Müller 34' (pen.); Six 49', 60'			Stadium: Neckarstadion; Attendance: 17,000; Referee: Adolf Ermer (Weiden)

24 April 1982 29	VfL Bochum	2 – 0	Eintracht Braunschweig	Bochum
15:30	Jakobs 20'; Patzke 54'			Stadium: Ruhrstadion; Attendance: 9,000; Referee: Peter Correll (Heilbronn)

28 April 1982 30	Borussia Mönchengladbach	4 – 2	VfL Bochum	Mönchengladbach
20:00	Pinkall 29', 69'; Rahn 37'; Hannes 43' (pen.)		Knüwe 13', 67'	Stadium: Bökelbergstadion; Attendance: 10,000; Referee: Walter Eschweiler (Bonn)

8 May 1982 31	VfL Bochum	1 – 2	1. FC Kaiserslautern	Bochum
15:30	Patzke 15' (pen.)		Brehme 65'; Eilenfeldt 68'	Stadium: Ruhrstadion; Attendance: 8,000; Referee: Max Klauser (Munich)

15 May 1982 32	VfL Bochum	1 – 1	Arminia Bielefeld	Bochum
15:30	Lameck 32' (pen.)		Pagelsdorf 90'	Stadium: Ruhrstadion; Attendance: 6,000; Referee: Hans Wahmann (Gelsenkirchen)

22 May 1982 33	Borussia Dortmund	3 – 2	VfL Bochum	Dortmund
15:30	Rüssmann 63'; Eggeling 69'; Klotz 85'		Bittorf 8'; Patzke 39'	Stadium: Westfalenstadion; Attendance: 29,000; Referee: Gerd Hennig (Duisburg)

29 May 1982 34	VfL Bochum	3 – 1	FC Bayern Munich	Bochum
15:30	Patzke 33', 68', 77'		Winklhofer 44'	Stadium: Ruhrstadion; Attendance: 18,000; Referee: Franz-Josef Hontheim (Trier)

=== DFB-Pokal ===
29 August 1981 R1	VfL Bochum	3 – 2	1. FC Paderborn	Bochum
	Oswald 9'; Abel 24' (pen.), 40'		Erkenbrecher 42' (pen.), 59' (pen.)	Stadium: Ruhrstadion; Attendance: 3,500; Referee: Joachim Kautschor (Eschweiler)

10 October 1981 R2	VfL Bochum	3 – 1	FC Tailfingen	Bochum
	Lemke 18'; Oswald 42'; K. Zagorny 82'		Rahn 3'	Stadium: Ruhrstadion; Attendance: 3,200; Referee: Rüdiger Wuttke (Oberhausen)

5 December 1981 R3	KSV Hessen Kassel	1 – 2	VfL Bochum	Kassel
	Woelk 53' (o.g.)		Schreier 73'; Blau 82'	Stadium: Auestadion; Attendance: 13,000; Referee: Udo Horeis (Hamburg)

9 January 1982 R4	SV Waldhof Mannheim	1 – 1 (a.e.t.)	VfL Bochum	Mannheim
	Walter 36'		R. Zagorny 80'	Stadium: Carl-Benz-Stadion; Attendance: 8,000; Referee: Volker Huster (Lahnstein)

26 January 1982 R4 replay	VfL Bochum	3 – 1	SV Waldhof Mannheim	Bochum
	Schlindwein 2' (o.g.); Abel 83'; Schreier 88'		Schlindwein 30'	Stadium: Ruhrstadion; Attendance: 5,000; Referee: Wolf-Rüdiger Umbach (Rottdorf)

20 February 1982 QF	VfL Bochum	3 – 1 (a.e.t.)	SSV Ulm 1846	Bochum
	Oswald 37', 110'; Schreier 118'		Szupak 54'	Stadium: Ruhrstadion; Attendance: 5,000; Referee: Friedrich Retzmann (Pinneberg)

10 April 1982 SF	VfL Bochum	1 – 2	FC Bayern Munich	Bochum
	Patzke 70'		Rummenigge 17'; Breitner 74' (pen.)	Stadium: Ruhrstadion; Attendance: 45,000; Referee: Jan Redelfs (Hannover)

== Squad ==
=== Squad and statistics ===
==== Squad, appearances and goals scored ====
No.	Pos	Nat	Player	Total		Bundesliga		DFB-Pokal	
No.	Pos	Nat	Player	Apps	Goals	Apps	Goals	Apps	Goals
	FW	(West Germany) FRG	Hans-Joachim Abel	35	13	29	10	6	3
	DF	(West Germany) FRG	Dieter Bast	41	2	34	2	7	0
	MF	(West Germany) FRG	Ulrich Bittorf	31	4	25	4	6	0
	MF	(West Germany) FRG	Rolf Blau	41	3	34	2	7	1
	FW	(West Germany) FRG	Frank Eggeling	6	0	5	0	1	0
	DF	(West Germany) FRG	Hermann Gerland	8	0	7	0	1	0
	MF	(Switzerland) SUI	Christian Gross (until 30 September 1981)	3	0	3	0	0	0
	DF	(West Germany) FRG	Michael Jakobs	35	1	29	1	6	0
	DF	(West Germany) FRG	Heinz Knüwe	31	3	28	3	3	0
	MF	(West Germany) FRG	Michael Kühn	9	0	8	0	1	0
	MF	(West Germany) FRG	Michael Lameck	39	2	32	2	7	0
	FW	(West Germany) FRG	Dieter Lemke	22	2	18	1	4	1
	GK	(West Germany) FRG	Reinhard Mager	21	0	17	0	4	0
	MF	(West Germany) FRG	Walter Oswald	37	8	30	4	7	4
	FW	(West Germany) FRG	Wolfgang Patzke	34	14	28	13	6	1
	MF	(West Germany) FRG	Christian Schreier	38	12	32	9	6	3
	DF	(West Germany) FRG	Bernd Storck	3	0	3	0	0	0
	DF	(West Germany) FRG	Lothar Woelk	38	1	31	1	7	0
	MF	(West Germany) FRG	Klaus Zagorny	1	1	0	0	1	1
	MF	(West Germany) FRG	Reinhold Zagorny	17	1	12	0	5	1
	DF	(Socialist Federal Republic of Yugoslavia) YUG	Ivan Žugčić	7	0	7	0	0	0
	GK	(West Germany) FRG	Ralf Zumdick	22	0	18	0	4	0

=== Transfers ===
==== Summer ====
In:

No.	Pos.	Nation	Player
—	MF	FRG	Ulrich Bittorf (from SC Herford)
—	FW	FRG	Frank Eggeling (from VfL Bochum youth)
—	MF	FRG	Michael Kühn (from VfL Bochum II)
—	FW	FRG	Wolfgang Patzke (from SG Wattenscheid 09)
—	MF	FRG	Christian Schreier (from TuS Paderborn-Neuhaus)
—	DF	FRG	Bernd Storck (from VfL Bochum youth)
—	MF	FRG	Klaus Zagorny (from VfL Bochum II)
—	MF	FRG	Reinhold Zagorny (from VfL Bochum II)
—	GK	FRG	Ralf Zumdick (from SC Preußen Münster)

Out:

No.	Pos.	Nation	Player
—	MF	SUI	Christian Gross (to FC St. Gallen)
—	FW	FRG	Josef Kaczor (to Feyenoord)
—	FW	FRG	Kurt Pinkall (to Borussia Mönchengladbach)
—	GK	FRG	Werner Scholz (to Rot-Weiss Essen)
—	DF	FRG	Franz-Josef Tenhagen (to Borussia Dortmund)
