= 1979–80 VfL Bochum season =

VfL Bochum
1979–80 season
- President: Ottokar Wüst
- Head Coach: Helmuth Johannsen
- Stadium: Ruhrstadion
- Bundesliga: 10th
- DFB-Pokal: Third Round
- Top goalscorer: League: Hans-Joachim Abel (13); All: Hans-Joachim Abel (16)
- Highest home attendance: 42,000 (vs Hamburger SV, 11 August 1979)
- Lowest home attendance: 9,000 (vs SV Werder Bremen, 31 May 1980)
- Average home league attendance: 21,471
Home colours	Away colours

The 1979–80 VfL Bochum season was the 42nd season in club history.

== Review and events ==
On 26 January 1980 21-year-old midfielder Lutz Gerresheim was involved in a car accident and fell into a coma. Gerresheim died on 10 March 1980.

== Matches ==
=== Legend ===
Win Draw Loss

=== Bundesliga ===
11 August 1979 1	VfL Bochum	0 – 3	Hamburger SV	Bochum
15:30			Hartwig 62'; Memering 75'; Magath 87'	Stadium: Ruhrstadion; Attendance: 42,000; Referee: Horst Joos (Stuttgart)

18 August 1979 2	Bayer 05 Uerdingen	1 – 0	VfL Bochum	Uerdingen
15:30	Mattsson 43'			Stadium: Grotenburg-Stadion; Attendance: 12,000; Referee: Wilfried Heitmann (Drentwede)

28 August 1979 3	VfL Bochum	0 – 0	Borussia Mönchengladbach	Bochum
20:00				Stadium: Ruhrstadion; Attendance: 25,000; Referee: Heinz Aldinger (Waiblingen)

1 September 1979 4	TSV 1860 Munich	1 – 0	VfL Bochum	Munich
15:30	Flohe 41' (pen.)			Stadium: Olympiastadion; Attendance: 27,000; Referee: Helmut Treib (Wadgassen)

8 September 1979 5	VfL Bochum	0 – 1	FC Bayern Munich	Bochum
15:30			Rummenigge 40'	Stadium: Ruhrstadion; Attendance: 33,000; Referee: Walter Horstmann (Hildesheim)

15 September 1979 6	Borussia Dortmund	2 – 2	VfL Bochum	Dortmund
15:30	Woelk 28' (o.g.); Burgsmüller 39'		Knüwe 25', 81'	Stadium: Westfalenstadion; Attendance: 42,000; Referee: Jan Redelfs (Hannover)

22 September 1979 7	VfL Bochum	2 – 1	Hertha BSC	Bochum
15:30	Oswald 10'; Abel 84'		Agerbeck 87'	Stadium: Ruhrstadion; Attendance: 16,000; Referee: Werner Ross (Ingolstadt)

6 October 1979 8	Fortuna Düsseldorf	1 – 4	VfL Bochum	Düsseldorf
15:30	Bommer 32'		Knüwe 18'; Abel 22'; Blau 84'; Gerland 87'	Stadium: Rheinstadion; Attendance: 13,000; Referee: Dieter Michel (Augsburg)

20 October 1979 9	VfL Bochum	3 – 0	MSV Duisburg	Bochum
15:30	Eggert 25'; Blau 41', 65'			Stadium: Ruhrstadion; Attendance: 23,000; Referee: Walter Eschweiler (Euskirchen)

27 October 1979 10	VfB Stuttgart	1 – 3	VfL Bochum	Stuttgart
15:30	Klotz 59'		Oswald 46'; Abel 63'; Kaczor 72'	Stadium: Neckarstadion; Attendance: 23,000; Referee: Gert Meuser (Ingelheim)

2 November 1979 11	VfL Bochum	0 – 0	1. FC Kaiserslautern	Bochum
20:00				Stadium: Ruhrstadion; Attendance: 30,000; Referee: Eberhard Schmoock (Reichenau)

10 November 1979 12	Eintracht Braunschweig	3 – 0	VfL Bochum	Braunschweig
15:30	Grobe 9'; Worm 83', 89'			Stadium: Eintracht-Stadion; Attendance: 11,000; Referee: Klaus Clajus (Karlsruhe)

17 November 1979 13	VfL Bochum	1 – 0	Eintracht Frankfurt	Bochum
15:30	Abel 80' (pen.)			Stadium: Ruhrstadion; Attendance: 20,000; Referee: Helmut Treib (Wadgassen)

23 November 1979 14	Bayer 04 Leverkusen	3 – 1	VfL Bochum	Leverkusen
20:00	Demuth 5', 43' (pen.); Hermann 89'		Abel 30' (pen.)	Stadium: Ulrich-Haberland-Stadion; Attendance: 10,000; Referee: Werner Burgers (Essen)

30 November 1979 15	1. FC Köln	2 – 1	VfL Bochum	Cologne
20:00	Schuster 34'; Littbarski 76'		Eggeling 35'	Stadium: Radrennbahn Müngersdorf; Attendance: 31,000; Referee: Gerd Hennig (Duisburg)

8 December 1979 16	VfL Bochum	0 – 0	FC Schalke 04	Bochum
15:30				Stadium: Ruhrstadion; Attendance: 35,000; Referee: Karl-Josef Assenmacher (Fischenich)

14 December 1979 17	SV Werder Bremen	2 – 0	VfL Bochum	Bremen
20:00	Röber 10'; Reinders 62'			Stadium: Weserstadion; Attendance: 10,000; Referee: Dieter Dreher (Darmstadt)

19 January 1980 18	Hamburger SV	3 – 1	VfL Bochum	Hamburg
15:30	Hrubesch 5', 55' (pen.); Milewski 76'		Knüwe 78'	Stadium: Volksparkstadion; Attendance: 19,000; Referee: Werner Ross (Ingolstadt)

26 January 1980 19	VfL Bochum	1 – 0	Bayer 05 Uerdingen	Bochum
15:30	Eggert 79'			Stadium: Ruhrstadion; Attendance: 10,000; Referee: Dieter Stäglich (Bonn)

2 February 1980 20	Borussia Mönchengladbach	3 – 2	VfL Bochum	Mönchengladbach
15:30	Bast 53', 90' (o.g.); Nickel 78' (pen.)		Abel 22'; Tenhagen 28'	Stadium: Bökelbergstadion; Attendance: 8,400; Referee: Udo Horeis (Hamburg)

9 February 1980 21	VfL Bochum	2 – 0	TSV 1860 Munich	Bochum
15:30	Lameck 23'; Abel 75'			Stadium: Ruhrstadion; Attendance: 15,000; Referee: Heinz Quindeau (Ludwigshafen)

23 February 1980 22	FC Bayern Munich	3 – 0	VfL Bochum	Munich
15:30	Horsmann 7'; Rummenigge 16'; Aas 80'			Stadium: Olympiastadion; Attendance: 16,000; Referee: Peter Gabor (West Berlin)

1 March 1980 23	VfL Bochum	2 – 2	Borussia Dortmund	Bochum
15:30	Abel 30', 54'		Frank 21'; Huber 90+1'	Stadium: Ruhrstadion; Attendance: 25,000; Referee: Wolf-Dieter Ahlenfelder (Oberhausen)

8 March 1980 24	Hertha BSC	1 – 0	VfL Bochum	West Berlin
15:30	Remark 87'			Stadium: Olympiastadion; Attendance: 13,000; Referee: Wilfried Heitmann (Drentwede)

14 March 1980 25	VfL Bochum	0 – 0	Fortuna Düsseldorf	Bochum
20:00				Stadium: Ruhrstadion; Attendance: 15,000; Referee: Dieter Dreher (Darmstadt)

21 March 1980 26	MSV Duisburg	0 – 1	VfL Bochum	Duisburg
20:00			Kaczor 23'	Stadium: Wedaustadion; Attendance: 10,000; Referee: Karl-Josef Assenmacher (Fischenich)

29 March 1980 27	VfL Bochum	0 – 1	VfB Stuttgart	Bochum
15:30			Förster 20'	Stadium: Ruhrstadion; Attendance: 15,000; Referee: Udo Horeis (Hamburg)

11 April 1980 28	1. FC Kaiserslautern	4 – 1	VfL Bochum	Kaiserslautern
20:00	Melzer 61'; Groh 77'; Bongartz 81'; Melzer 88'		Kaczor 55'	Stadium: Betzenbergstadion; Attendance: 26,510; Referee: Jan Redelfs (Hannover)

18 April 1980 29	VfL Bochum	2 – 1	Eintracht Braunschweig	Bochum
20:00	Pinkall 49'; Abel 85'		Bruns 21'	Stadium: Ruhrstadion; Attendance: 16,000; Referee: Robert Walz (Waiblingen)

26 April 1980 30	Eintracht Frankfurt	0 – 1	VfL Bochum	Frankfurt am Main
15:30			Kaczor 55'	Stadium: Waldstadion; Attendance: 10,000; Referee: Franz-Josef Hontheim (Trier)

2 May 1980 31	VfL Bochum	4 – 2	Bayer 04 Leverkusen	Bochum
20:00	Woelk 15'; Kaczor 28'; Abel 58', 90'		Hermann 31'; Brücken 75'	Stadium: Ruhrstadion; Attendance: 18,000; Referee: Eberhard Schmoock (Reichenau)

17 May 1980 32	VfL Bochum	2 – 0	1. FC Köln	Bochum
15:30	Pinkall 82'; Oswald 85'			Stadium: Ruhrstadion; Attendance: 18,000; Referee: Jan Redelfs (Hannover)

24 May 1980 33	FC Schalke 04	1 – 0	VfL Bochum	Gelsenkirchen
15:30	Thiele 75'			Stadium: Parkstadion; Attendance: 5,000; Referee: Horst Joos (Stuttgart)

31 May 1980 34	VfL Bochum	5 – 2	SV Werder Bremen	Bochum
15:30	Bast 26'; Lameck 28'; Eggert 51'; Abel 70' (pen.); Kaczor 78'		Dreßel 19'; Steinkogler 50'	Stadium: Ruhrstadion; Attendance: 9,000; Referee: Winfried Walz (Waiblingen)

=== DFB-Pokal ===
25 August 1979 R1	FV Weingarten	2 – 7	VfL Bochum	Weingarten
	Kraut 40'; Pfirrmann 81'		Blau 38'; Eggeling 44', 70', 71', 89'; Kaczor 82', 86'	Attendance: 4,000; Referee: Karl Gaus (Empfingen)

29 September 1979 R2	VfL Bochum	2 – 1	SpVgg Fürth	Bochum
	Oswald 13'; Kaczor 43'		Bulut 55'	Stadium: Ruhrstadion; Attendance: 7,000; Referee: Jakob Wippker (Aachen)

12 January 1980 R3	VfL Bochum	3 – 3 (a.e.t.)	1. FC Köln	Bochum
	Abel 63', 78'; Bast 94'		Schuster 15' (pen.), 60'; Neumann 116'	Stadium: Ruhrstadion; Attendance: 15,000; Referee: Günter Linn (Altendiez)

30 January 1980 R3 replay	1. FC Köln	2 – 1	VfL Bochum	Cologne
	Müller 8'; Woodcock 33'		Abel 14'	Stadium: Radrennbahn Müngersdorf; Attendance: 11,000; Referee: Walter Horstmann (Hildesheim)

== Squad ==
=== Squad and statistics ===
==== Squad, appearances and goals scored ====
No.	Pos	Nat	Player	Total		Bundesliga		DFB-Pokal	
No.	Pos	Nat	Player	Apps	Goals	Apps	Goals	Apps	Goals
	FW	(West Germany) FRG	Hans-Joachim Abel	37	16	34	13	3	3
	DF	(West Germany) FRG	Dieter Bast	33	2	29	1	4	1
	DF	(West Germany) FRG	Ulrich Bittorf	2	0	1	0	1	0
	DF	(West Germany) FRG	Rolf Blau	36	4	33	3	3	1
	MF	(Socialist Federal Republic of Yugoslavia) YUG	Luka Bonačić	11	0	10	0	1	0
	FW	(West Germany) FRG	Heinz-Werner Eggeling (until 1 December 1979)	14	5	13	1	1	4
	MF	(West Germany) FRG	Michael Eggert	27	3	23	3	4	0
	DF	(West Germany) FRG	Klaus Franke	0	0	0	0	0	0
	DF	(West Germany) FRG	Hermann Gerland	23	1	19	1	4	0
	MF	(West Germany) FRG	Lutz Gerresheim (until 10 March 1980)	7	0	5	0	2	0
	DF	(West Germany) FRG	Detlef Jaskowiak	1	0	0	0	1	0
	FW	(West Germany) FRG	Josef Kaczor	29	9	27	6	2	3
	DF	(West Germany) FRG	Heinz Knüwe	36	4	32	4	4	0
	MF	(West Germany) FRG	Hans-Jürgen Köper	0	0	0	0	0	0
	DF	(West Germany) FRG	Michael Lameck	37	2	33	2	4	0
	GK	(West Germany) FRG	Reinhard Mager	38	0	34	0	4	0
	MF	(West Germany) FRG	Walter Oswald	30	4	27	3	3	1
	FW	(West Germany) FRG	Kurt Pinkall	7	2	7	2	0	0
	FW	(West Germany) FRG	Werner Schachten	3	0	3	0	0	0
	FW	(West Germany) FRG	Ottmar Scheuch	3	0	2	0	1	0
	GK	(West Germany) FRG	Werner Scholz	0	0	0	0	0	0
	MF	(West Germany) FRG	Franz-Josef Tenhagen	38	1	34	1	4	0
	DF	(West Germany) FRG	Lothar Woelk	37	1	34	1	3	0

=== Transfers ===
==== Summer ====
In:

No.	Pos.	Nation	Player
—	DF	FRG	Ulrich Bittorf (from VfL Bochum II)
—	MF	YUG	Luka Bonačić (from Grasshopper Club Zürich)
—	MF	FRG	Lutz Gerresheim (from SC Westfalia Herne)
—	DF	FRG	Heinz Knüwe (from SC Herford)
—	FW	FRG	Kurt Pinkall (from SC Viktoria Köln)
—	FW	FRG	Ottmar Scheuch (from SpVgg Au/Iller)

Out:

No.	Pos.	Nation	Player
—	MF	FRG	Paul Holz (to Borussia Dortmund)
—	FW	FRG	Hans-Joachim Pochstein (to BV Brambauer)
—	MF	FRG	Holger Trimhold (to Eintracht Braunschweig)

==== Winter ====
In:

No.	Pos.	Nation	Player
—	DF	FRG	Detlef Jaskowiak (from ?)

Out:

No.	Pos.	Nation	Player
—	FW	FRG	Heinz-Werner Eggeling (to Eintracht Braunschweig)
—	MF	FRG	Lutz Gerresheim (died 10 March 1980)
