= 1978–79 VfL Bochum season =

VfL Bochum
1978–79 season
- President: Ottokar Wüst
- Head Coach: Heinz Höher
- Stadium: Stadion an der Castroper Straße
- Bundesliga: 8th
- DFB-Pokal: Fourth Round
- Intertoto Cup: Group stage
- Top goalscorer: League: Hans-Joachim Abel (11); All: N/A
- Highest home attendance: 45,000 (vs FC Schalke 04, 16 September 1978)
- Lowest home attendance: 7,000 (vs SV Darmstadt 98, 2 June 1979)
- Average home league attendance: 26,059
Home colours	Away colours	Third colours

The 1978–79 VfL Bochum season was the 41st season in club history.

== Matches ==
=== Legend ===
Win Draw Loss

=== Bundesliga ===
12 August 1978 1	1. FC Nürnberg	0–2	VfL Bochum	Nuremberg
15:30			Abel 32'; Eggert 81'	Stadium: Städtisches Stadion; Attendance: 42,000; Referee: Klaus Ohmsen (Hamburg)

19 August 1978 2	VfL Bochum	2–2	Fortuna Düsseldorf	Bochum
15:30	Oswald 24'; Woelk 79'		Günther 43'; Szymanek 80'	Stadium: Stadion an der Castroper Straße; Attendance: 30,000; Referee: Rudolf Frickel (Munich)

26 August 1978 3	Hamburger SV	1–1	VfL Bochum	Hamburg
15:30	Hartwig 25'		Bast 88'	Stadium: Volksparkstadion; Attendance: 32,000; Referee: Wilfried Brückner (Darmstadt)

2 September 1978 4	VfL Bochum	4–1	Borussia Dortmund	Bochum
15:30	Abel 27'; Oswald 44'; Eggeling 52'; Köper 89'		Theis 71'	Stadium: Stadion an der Castroper Straße; Attendance: Walter Horstmann (Hildesheim); Referee: 40,000

8 September 1978 5	MSV Duisburg	1–0	VfL Bochum	Duisburg
20:00	Worm 11'			Stadium: Wedaustadion; Attendance: 24,000; Referee: Franz-Josef Hontheim (Trier)

16 September 1978 6	VfL Bochum	2–2	FC Schalke 04	Bochum
15:30	Eggeling 70'; Eggert 73'		Larsson 35'; Abramczik 79'	Stadium: Stadion an der Castroper Straße; Attendance: 45,000; Referee: Winfried Walz (Waiblingen)

30 September 1978 7	Eintracht Frankfurt	4–2	VfL Bochum	Frankfurt am Main
15:30	Lorant 22' (pen.), 61' (pen.); Hölzenbein 45'; Grabowski 88'		Eggert 65'; Eggeling 90'	Stadium: Waldstadion; Attendance: 17,000; Referee: Peter Gabor (West Berlin)

6 October 1978 8	VfL Bochum	1–0	Arminia Bielefeld	Bochum
20:00	Eggert 89'			Stadium: Stadion an der Castroper Straße; Attendance: 20,000; Referee: Hans-Heinrich Barnick (Schenfeld)

14 October 1978 9	FC Bayern Munich	2–1	VfL Bochum	Munich
15:30	Dürnberger 21'; Horsmann 88'		Eggert 15'	Stadium: Olympiastadion; Attendance: 29,000; Referee: Wilfried Heitmann (Drentwede)

21 October 1978 10	VfL Bochum	0–0	Borussia Mönchengladbach	Bochum
15:30				Stadium: Stadion an der Castroper Straße; Attendance: 28,000; Referee: Manfred Dölfel (Fürth)

27 October 1978 11	SV Werder Bremen	3–3	VfL Bochum	Bremen
20:00	Reinders 6'; Möhlmann 15'; Wunder 48'		Abel 18', 77'; Blau 65'	Stadium: Weserstadion; Attendance: 14,000; Referee: Eberhard Schmoock (Reichenau)

3 November 1978 12	VfL Bochum	3–0	Eintracht Braunschweig	Bochum
20:00	Eggert 7'; Bast 44' (pen.); Eggeling 65'			Stadium: Stadion an der Castroper Straße; Attendance: 25,000; Referee: Jürgen Meßmer (Mannheim)

11 November 1978 13	VfL Bochum	1–2	VfB Stuttgart	Bochum
15:30	Eggert 44'		Hoeneß 4'; Ohlicher 51'	Stadium: Stadion an der Castroper Straße; Attendance: 30,000; Referee: Klaus Ohmsen (Hamburg)

18 November 1978 14	Hertha BSC	1–1	VfL Bochum	West Berlin
15:30	Tenhagen 24' (o.g.)		Lameck 75' (pen.)	Stadium: Olympiastadion; Attendance: 13,000; Referee: Robert Walz (Waiblingen)

24 November 1978 15	VfL Bochum	2–5	1. FC Köln	Bochum
20:00	Bast 64', 77'		Flohe 12'; Okudera 25' van Gool 74'; Müller 87'; Zimmermann 89'	Stadium: Stadion an der Castroper Straße; Attendance: 30,000; Referee: Gert Meuser (Ingelheim)

30 December 1978 16	SV Darmstadt 98	3–1	VfL Bochum	Darmstadt
14:00	Bechtold 40'; Cestonaro 63'; Hahn 87'		Bast 55'	Stadium: Stadion am Böllenfalltor; Attendance: 13,000; Referee: Günter Linn (Altendiez)

15 December 1978 17	VfL Bochum	2–2	1. FC Kaiserslautern	Bochum
20:00	Tenhagen 80'; Bast 90'		Wolf 63'; Dobiasch 75'	Stadium: Stadion an der Castroper Straße; Attendance: 18,000; Referee: Wilfried Brückner (Darmstadt)

20 March 1979 18	VfL Bochum	2–1	1. FC Nürnberg	Bochum
20:00	Eggeling 39'; Woelk 58'		Živaljević 81'	Stadium: Stadion an der Castroper Straße; Attendance: 22,000; Referee: Jan Redelfs (Hannover)

20 January 1979 19	Fortuna Düsseldorf	1–1	VfL Bochum	Düsseldorf
15:30	Fanz 86'		Abel 20'	Stadium: Rheinstadion; Attendance: 12,600; Referee: Manfred Dölfel (Fürth)

3 March 1979 20	VfL Bochum	2–1	Hamburger SV	Bochum
15:30	Abel 60' (pen.); Holz 67'		Hrubesch 9'	Stadium: Stadion an der Castroper Straße; Attendance: 33,000; Referee: Werner Ross (Ingolstadt)

3 February 1979 21	Borussia Dortmund	2–2	VfL Bochum	Dortmund
15:30	Votava 81'; Oswald 83' (o.g.)		Abel 15' (pen.); Eggert 49'	Stadium: Westfalenstadion; Attendance: 27,000; Referee: Max Klauser (Munich)

10 March 1979 22	VfL Bochum	0–0	MSV Duisburg	Bochum
15:30				Stadium: Stadion an der Castroper Straße; Attendance: 28,000; Referee: Medardus Luca (Völklingen)

17 March 1979 23	FC Schalke 04	1–3	VfL Bochum	Gelsenkirchen
15:30	Abramczik 26'		Eggeling 13'; Abel 58'; Blau 64'	Stadium: Parkstadion; Attendance: Jürgen Meßmer (Mannheim); Referee: 25,000

24 March 1979 24	VfL Bochum	0–0	Eintracht Frankfurt	Bochum
15:30				Stadium: Stadion an der Castroper Straße; Attendance: Walter Niemann (Hamburg); Referee: 22,000

4 April 1979 25	Arminia Bielefeld	1–2	VfL Bochum	Bielefeld
20:00	Graul 6'		Woelk 42'; Abel 89'	Stadium: Alm; Attendance: 20,000; Referee: Walter Horstmann (Hildesheim)

7 April 1979 26	VfL Bochum	0–1	FC Bayern Munich	Bochum
15:30			Rummenigge 83'	Stadium: Stadion an der Castroper Straße; Attendance: 34,000; Referee: Helmut Treib (Wadgassen)

14 April 1979 27	Borussia Mönchengladbach	2–0	VfL Bochum	Mönchengladbach
15:30	Kulik 59'; Lienen 78'			Stadium: Bökelbergstadion; Attendance: 15,224; Referee: Eberhard Schmoock (Reichenau)

18 April 1979 28	VfL Bochum	3–0	SV Werder Bremen	Bochum
20:00	Eggeling 18'; Blau 72'; Abel 89'			Stadium: Stadion an der Castroper Straße; Attendance: 16,000; Referee: Walter Engel (Reimsbach)

21 April 1979 29	Eintracht Braunschweig	1–0	VfL Bochum	Braunschweig
15:30	Popivoda 50'			Stadium: Eintracht-Stadion; Attendance: 11,000; Referee: Werner Ross (Ingolstadt)

5 May 1979 30	VfB Stuttgart	2–0	VfL Bochum	Stuttgart
15:30	Kelsch 11'; Müller 78'			Stadium: Neckarstadion; Attendance: 34,000; Referee: Wilfried Heitmann (Drentwede)

12 May 1979 31	VfL Bochum	1–0	Hertha BSC	Bochum
15:30	Oswald 14'			Stadium: Stadion an der Castroper Straße; Attendance: 15,000; Referee: Gert Meuser (Ingelheim)

19 May 1979 32	1. FC Köln	1–1	VfL Bochum	Cologne
15:30	Littbarski 83'		Kaczor 9'	Stadium: Radrennbahn Müngersdorf; Attendance: 8,000; Referee: Gerd Hennig (Duisburg)

2 June 1979 33	VfL Bochum	1–2	SV Darmstadt 98	Bochum
15:30	Eggeling 73'		Bechtold 78'; Kleppinger 88'	Stadium: Stadion an der Castroper Straße; Attendance: 7,000; Referee: Peter Gabor (West Berlin)

9 June 1979 34	1. FC Kaiserslautern	1–1	VfL Bochum	Kaiserslautern
15:30	Schwarz 84'		Abel 62'	Stadium: Betzenbergstadion; Attendance: 12,356; Referee: Walter Niemann (Hamburg)

=== DFB-Pokal ===
5 August 1978 R1	VfL Bochum	4–0	Bünder SV	Bochum
	Abel 2'; Lameck 33'; Woelk 52'; Trimhold 54'			Stadium: Stadion an der Castroper Straße; Attendance: 5,000; Referee: Klaus Broska (Gelsenkirchen)

22 September 1978 R2	VfL Bochum	4–2 (a.e.t.)	DSC Wanne-Eickel	Bochum
	Oswald 84'; Bast 113', 114'; Abel 118'		Kosien 16'; Mauthe 105'	Stadium: Stadion an der Castroper Straße; Attendance: 12,700; Referee: Karl-Josef Assenmacher (Fischenich)

2 December 1978 R3	FC 08 Homburg	0–0 (a.e.t.)	VfL Bochum	Homburg
				Stadium: Waldstadion; Attendance: 9,000; Referee: Max Klauser (Munich)

7 January 1979 R3 replay	VfL Bochum	1–0	FC 08 Homburg	Bochum
	Abel 8'			Stadium: Stadion an der Castroper Straße; Attendance: 6,500; Referee: Dieter Pauly (Rheydt)

28 April 1979 R4	Bayer 05 Uerdingen	4–2	VfL Bochum	Uerdingen
	Steffensen 15'; Raschid 55'; Hahn 73'; Funkel 80' (pen.)		Abel 50'; Lameck 68' (pen.)	Stadium: Grotenburg-Stadion; Attendance: 10,000; Referee: Dieter Dreher (Darmstadt)

=== Intertoto Cup ===
11 May 1978 GS1	RFC Liège (Belgium)	1–2	VfL Bochum
				Attendance: 700

13 May 1978 GS2	VfL Bochum	5–0	(France) FC Metz
	Abel 15', 43', 64' (pen.); Bast 57'; Woelk 71' (pen.)			Attendance: 6,000

17 May 1978 GS3	VfL Bochum	3–1	(Italy) Atalanta B.C.
				Attendance: 6,000

20 May 1978 GS4	VfL Bochum	2–1	(Belgium) RFC Liège
	Herget 16'; Trimhold 85'		Klinge 65'	Attendance: 6,000

24 May 1978 GS5	FC Metz (France)	2–0	VfL Bochum
				Attendance: 1,200

31 May 1978 GS6	Atalanta B.C. (Italy)	1–2	VfL Bochum
				Attendance: 6,000

== Squad ==
=== Squad and statistics ===
==== Squad, appearances and goals scored ====
No.	Pos	Nat	Player	Total		Bundesliga		DFB-Pokal		Intertoto Cup	
No.	Pos	Nat	Player	Apps	Goals	Apps	Goals	Apps	Goals	Apps	Goals
	FW	(West Germany) FRG	Hans-Joachim Abel	32	15	28	11	4	4		
	MF	(West Germany) FRG	Dieter Bast	38	8	33	6	5	2		
	MF	(West Germany) FRG	Rolf Blau	26	3	24	3	2	0		
	FW	(West Germany) FRG	Heinz-Werner Eggeling	39	8	34	8	5	0		
	DF	(West Germany) FRG	Michael Eggert	36	8	31	8	5	0		
	DF	(West Germany) FRG	Klaus Franke	0	0	0	0	0	0		
	DF	(West Germany) FRG	Hermann Gerland	26	0	22	0	4	0		
	DF	(West Germany) FRG	Matthias Herget (until 30 Juni 1978)	0	0	0	0	0	0		
	MF	(West Germany) FRG	Paul Holz	24	1	20	1	4	0		
	FW	(West Germany) FRG	Josef Kaczor	11	1	11	1	0	0		
	MF	(West Germany) FRG	Hans-Jürgen Köper	11	1	9	1	2	0		
	DF	(West Germany) FRG	Michael Lameck	39	3	34	1	5	2		
	GK	(West Germany) FRG	Reinhard Mager	24	0	21	0	3	0		
	MF	(West Germany) FRG	Walter Oswald	37	4	33	3	4	1		
	FW	(West Germany) FRG	Hans-Joachim Pochstein	8	0	6	0	2	0		
	FW	(West Germany) FRG	Werner Schachten	0	0	0	0	0	0		
	GK	(West Germany) FRG	Werner Scholz	16	0	14	0	2	0		
	DF	(West Germany) FRG	Franz-Josef Tenhagen	37	1	32	1	5	0		
	MF	(West Germany) FRG	Holger Trimhold	32	1	27	0	5	1		
	DF	(West Germany) FRG	Dieter Versen	11	0	11	0	0	0		
	DF	(West Germany) FRG	Lothar Woelk	38	4	33	3	5	1		

=== Transfers ===
==== Summer ====
In:

No.	Pos.	Nation	Player
—	MF	FRG	Rolf Blau (from FC St. Pauli)
—	MF	FRG	Walter Oswald (from FC St. Pauli)

Out:

No.	Pos.	Nation	Player
—	MF	FRG	Wolfgang Euteneuer (to VfL Bochum II)
—	DF	FRG	Matthias Herget (to Rot-Weiss Essen)
—	FW	FRG	Peter Kursinski (to VfL Bochum II)
—	MF	FRG	Ralf Schaffeld (to SG Wattenscheid 09)
—	FW	FRG	Dieter Schwemmle (to FC Hanau 93)
—	DF	FRG	Klaus Wischniewski (to DSC Wanne-Eickel)

==== Winter ====
In:

No.	Pos.	Nation	Player

Out:

No.	Pos.	Nation	Player
—	DF	FRG	Dieter Versen (to San Jose Earthquakes)
