= List of VfL Bochum seasons =

This is a list of seasons played by VfL Bochum in German and European football, from 1938 to the present day. It details the club's achievements in major competitions, and the top scorers for each season.

== Seasons ==
=== Men ===
Season	League									German Cup	Other competitions		League top scorer(s)		Notes
Season	Division (Level)	Pld	W	D	L	GF	GA	Pts	Pos	German Cup	Other competitions		League top scorer(s)		Notes
1938–39	Gauliga Westfalen (I)	18	9	6	3	39	13	24	2nd	Second Preliminary Round			Philipp	11	
1939–40	Gauliga Westfalen (I)	18	10	1	7	54	50	21	3rd	First Preliminary Round			Paßgang, Rudzinski	12	
1940–41	Gauliga Westfalen (I)	22	8	5	9	51	54	21	8th	Second Preliminary Round			Marzelewski	15	
1941–42	Gauliga Westfalen (I)	18	9	2	7	30	27	20	3rd	Third Preliminary Round			Paßgang	11	
1942–43	Gauliga Westfalen (I)	18	8	3	7	47	50	19	4th	Second Preliminary Round			Sandkühler	11	
1943–44	Gauliga Westfalen (I)	18	6	3	9	26	42	15	6th	Did not qualify	Gaupokal Westfalen	First Round	Hecht	4	(Note: In the 1943–44 and 1944–45 seasons the VfL competed as Kriegsspielgemeinschaft VfL 1848/Preußen Bochum together with Vereinigte Preußen Bochum.) (Note: Due to World War II the format of the German Cup changed in 1943: the preliminary rounds were replaced by regional cups. Only the regional cup winners qualified for the national competition.)
1944–45	Gauliga Westfalen (I)	3	2	0	1	12	6	4	3rd	—	Gaupokal Westfalen	Semi-finals	Pawlowski	5	(Note: Due to World War II the 1944–45 Gauliga Westfalen season was abandoned in fall of 1944, with only a few matches played. The German Cup tournament was not held, though the regional qualification cups had concluded in the summer of 1944.)
1945–46	Landesliga Westfalen (I)	16	6	1	9	34	39	13	7th	—					
1946–47	Landesliga Westfalen (I)	18	4	3	11	20	35	11	7th	—					
1947–48	Landesliga Westfalen (II)	22	8	4	10	35	36	20	6th	—					(Note: The Oberliga West was introduced (1947–48), which moved the Landesliga Westfalen down one level on the West German league pyramid.)
1948–49	Landesliga Westfalen (II)	26	14	6	6	50	36	34	3rd	—					
1949–50	2. Oberliga West (II)	30	10	5	15	57	55	25	12th	—	Western German Cup	Third Round	Kalinka	20	(Note: The 2. Oberliga West was introduced (1949–50), which moved the Landesliga Westfalen down one level on the West German league pyramid.)
1950–51	2. Oberliga West (II)	30	15	3	12	54	52	33	7th	—	Western German Cup	First Round	Koch	12	
1951–52	2. Oberliga West (II)	32	16	3	13	66	53	35	5th	—	Western German Cup	First Round	Ocker	17	
1952–53	2. Oberliga West (II)	30	20	5	5	73	26	45	1st	Did not qualify	Western German Cup	Second Round	Koch	18	
1953–54	Oberliga West (I)	30	13	5	12	50	58	31	8th	Did not qualify	Western German Cup	Second Round	Kleina	12	
1954–55	Oberliga West (I)	30	6	11	13	36	46	23	16th	Did not qualify	Western German Cup	First Round	Bühner	10	
1955–56	2. Oberliga West (II)	30	21	4	5	78	33	46	1st	Did not qualify	Western German Cup	First Round	Schirrmacher	19	
1956–57	Oberliga West (I)	30	9	11	10	54	54	29	10th	Did not qualify	Western German Cup	Third Round	Hohmann	12	
1957–58	Oberliga West (I)	30	8	8	14	39	62	24	14th	Did not qualify	Western German Cup	First Round	Bergmeier, Hohmann	8	
1958–59	Oberliga West (I)	30	14	8	8	61	43	36	4th	Did not qualify	Western German Cup	Second Round	Bergmeier	11	
1959–60	Oberliga West (I)	30	8	11	11	46	49	27	11th	Did not qualify	Western German Cup	Second Round	Backhaus	12	
1960–61	Oberliga West (I)	30	9	5	16	45	62	23	16th	First Round	Western German Cup	German Cup qualification	Pawlak	12	
1961–62	2. Oberliga West (II)	30	15	5	10	58	40	35	3rd	Did not qualify	Western German Cup	Second Round	Kurtenbach	13	
1962–63	2. Oberliga West (II)	30	12	3	15	54	53	27	14th	Did not qualify	Western German Cup	Second Round	Jablonski	16	
1963–64	Verbandsliga Westfalen (III)	30	15	8	7	60	32	38	2nd	Did not qualify	Western German Cup	First Round	Wagener	15	
1964–65	Verbandsliga Westfalen (III)	32	22	6	4	75	25	50	1st	Did not qualify	Western German Cup	Second Round	Eversberg	20	
1964–65	Verbandsliga Westfalen (III)	32	22	6	4	75	25	50	1st	Did not qualify	Promotion playoffs	Winner	Eversberg	20	
1965–66	Regionalliga West (II)	34	12	6	16	46	66	30	12th	Did not qualify	Western German Cup	Third Round	Eversberg	12	
1966–67	Regionalliga West (II)	34	18	9	7	67	42	45	4th	Did not qualify	Western German Cup	First Round	Eversberg	20	
1967–68	Regionalliga West (II)	34	18	6	10	65	32	42	5th	Runners-up	Western German Cup	German Cup qualification	Eversberg	15	
1968–69	Regionalliga West (II)	34	23	5	6	86	36	51	2nd	Did not qualify	Western German Cup	Third Round	Balte	20	
1969–70	Regionalliga West (II)	34	21	8	5	63	32	50	1st	Did not qualify	Western German Cup	Fourth Round	Walitza	31	
1969–70	Regionalliga West (II)	34	21	8	5	63	32	50	1st	Did not qualify	Promotion playoffs	Runners-up	Walitza	31	
1970–71	Regionalliga West (II)	34	26	4	4	81	27	56	1st	Did not qualify	Western German Cup	Fourth Round	Walitza	28	
1970–71	Regionalliga West (II)	34	26	4	4	81	27	56	1st	Did not qualify	Promotion playoffs	Winner	Walitza	28	
1971–72	Bundesliga (I)	34	14	6	14	59	69	34	9th	Second Round			Walitza	22	
1972–73	Bundesliga (I)	34	11	9	14	50	68	31	12th	Second Round	DFB-Ligapokal	Group stage	Walitza	18	
1973–74	Bundesliga (I)	34	9	12	13	45	57	30	14th	First Round			Walitza	13	
1974–75	Bundesliga (I)	34	14	5	15	53	53	33	11th	Fourth Round			Balte	14	
1975–76	Bundesliga (I)	34	12	6	16	49	62	30	14th	Third Round			Kaczor	12	
1976–77	Bundesliga (I)	34	11	7	16	47	62	29	15th	Third Round			Kaczor	21	
1977–78	Bundesliga (I)	34	11	9	14	49	51	31	14th	Fourth Round			Abel	15	
1978–79	Bundesliga (I)	34	10	13	11	47	46	33	8th	Fourth Round	Intertoto Cup	Group stage	Abel	11	
1979–80	Bundesliga (I)	34	13	6	15	41	44	32	10th	Third Round			Abel	13	
1980–81	Bundesliga (I)	34	9	15	10	53	45	33	9th	Fourth Round	Intertoto Cup	Group stage	Pinkall	17	
1981–82	Bundesliga (I)	34	12	8	14	52	51	32	10th	Semi-finals			Patzke	13	
1982–83	Bundesliga (I)	34	8	12	14	43	49	28	13th	Quarter-finals			Patzke, Schreier	8	
1983–84	Bundesliga (I)	34	10	8	16	58	70	28	15th	First Round			Schreier	18	
1984–85	Bundesliga (I)	34	12	10	12	52	54	34	9th	Second Round			Fischer	16	
1985–86	Bundesliga (I)	34	14	4	16	55	57	32	9th	Third Round			Kuntz	22	
1986–87	Bundesliga (I)	34	9	14	11	52	44	32	11th	First Round			Schulz	11	
1987–88	Bundesliga (I)	34	10	10	14	47	51	30	12th	Runners-up	Intertoto Cup	Group stage	Leifeld	13	
1988–89	Bundesliga (I)	34	9	8	17	37	57	26	15th	Second Round			Leifeld	13	
1989–90	Bundesliga (I)	34	11	7	16	44	53	29	16th	Second Round	Relegation playoff	Winner	Leifeld	10	
1990–91	Bundesliga (I)	34	9	11	14	50	52	29	14th	First Round	Intertoto Cup	Group stage	Kohn	11	
1991–92	Bundesliga (I)	38	10	13	15	38	55	33	15th	Second Round			Wegmann	11	
1992–93	Bundesliga (I)	34	8	10	16	45	52	26	16th	Second Round	Intertoto Cup	Group stage	Wegmann	13	
1993–94	2. Bundesliga (II)	38	19	10	9	56	34	48	1st	Second Round	Intertoto Cup	Group stage	Wegmann	22	
1994–95	Bundesliga (I)	34	9	4	21	43	67	22	16th	Second Round			Wegmann	11	
1995–96	2. Bundesliga (II)	34	21	6	7	68	30	69	1st	First Round			Közle, Peschel	11	(Note: Starting with the 1995–96 season the German Football Association introduced three points for a win.)
1996–97	Bundesliga (I)	34	14	11	9	54	51	53	5th	Quarter-finals			Donkov	10	
1997–98	Bundesliga (I)	34	11	8	15	41	49	41	12th	Second Round	UEFA Cup	Third Round	Peschel	6	
1997–98	Bundesliga (I)	34	11	8	15	41	49	41	12th	Second Round	DFB-Ligapokal	First Round	Peschel	6	
1998–99	Bundesliga (I)	34	7	8	19	40	65	29	17th	Third Round			Kuntz	6	
1999–00	2. Bundesliga (II)	34	18	7	9	67	48	61	2nd	Quarter-finals			Weber	19	
2000–01	Bundesliga (I)	34	7	6	21	30	67	27	18th	Quarter-finals			Marić	8	
2001–02	2. Bundesliga (II)	34	19	8	7	69	49	65	3rd	Second Round			Christiansen	17	
2002–03	Bundesliga (I)	34	12	9	13	55	56	45	9th	Quarter-finals			Christiansen	21	
2003–04	Bundesliga (I)	34	15	11	8	57	39	56	5th	First Round	DFB-Ligapokal	First Round	Hashemian	16	
2004–05	Bundesliga (I)	34	9	8	17	47	68	35	16th	Second Round	UEFA Cup	First Round	Lokvenc	10	
2004–05	Bundesliga (I)	34	9	8	17	47	68	35	16th	Second Round	DFB-Ligapokal	First Round	Lokvenc	10	
2005–06	2. Bundesliga (II)	34	19	9	6	55	26	66	1st	Second Round			Edu	12	
2006–07	Bundesliga (I)	34	13	6	15	49	50	45	8th	Third Round			Gekas	20	
2007–08	Bundesliga (I)	34	10	11	13	48	54	41	12th	Second Round			Šesták	13	
2008–09	Bundesliga (I)	34	7	11	16	39	55	32	14th	Second Round			Šesták	9	
2009–10	Bundesliga (I)	34	6	10	18	33	64	28	17th	Second Round			Šesták	6	
2010–11	2. Bundesliga (II)	34	20	5	9	49	35	65	3rd	First Round	Promotion playoff	Runners-up	Chŏng	10	
2011–12	2. Bundesliga (II)	34	10	7	17	41	55	37	11th	Third Round			Inui	7	
2012–13	2. Bundesliga (II)	34	10	8	16	40	52	38	14th	Quarter-finals			Dedič	8	
2013–14	2. Bundesliga (II)	34	11	7	16	30	43	40	15th	Second Round			Sukuta-Pasu	6	
2014–15	2. Bundesliga (II)	34	9	15	10	53	55	42	11th	Second Round			Terodde	16	
2015–16	2. Bundesliga (II)	34	13	12	9	56	40	51	5th	Quarter-finals			Terodde	25	
2016–17	2. Bundesliga (II)	34	10	14	10	42	47	44	9th	First Round			Mlapa, Wurtz	8	
2017–18	2. Bundesliga (II)	34	13	9	12	37	40	48	6th	Second Round			Hinterseer	14	
2018–19	2. Bundesliga (II)	34	11	11	12	49	50	44	11th	First Round			Hinterseer	18	
2019–20	2. Bundesliga (II)	34	11	13	10	53	51	46	8th	Second Round			Ganvoula	13	
2020–21	2. Bundesliga (II)	34	21	4	9	66	39	67	1st	Third Round			Zoller, Žulj	15	
2021–22	Bundesliga (I)	34	12	6	16	38	52	42	13th	Quarter-finals			Polter	10	
2022–23	Bundesliga (I)	34	10	5	19	40	72	35	14th	Round of 16			Hofmann	8	
2023–24	Bundesliga (I)	34	7	12	15	42	74	33	16th	First Round	Relegation playoff	Winner	Stöger	7	
2024–25	Bundesliga (I)	34	6	7	21	33	67	25	18th	First Round			Boadu	9	
2025–26	2. Bundesliga (II)	34	11	11	12	49	47	44	9th	Round of 16			Hofmann	12	
Total		2,765	1,048	664	1032	4,335	4,225	3,186	As of 17 May 2026						

=== Women ===
Season	League									German Cup	Other competitions		League top scorer		Notes
Season	Division (Level)	Pld	W	D	L	GF	GA	Pts	Pos	German Cup	Other competitions		League top scorer		Notes
2010–11	Regionalliga West (III)	26	19	3	4	68	17	60	2nd	First Round	Westphalian Cup	Winner	Ekamp	11	
2011–12	Regionalliga West (III)	24	17	4	3	59	15	55	2nd	First Round	Westphalian Cup	Second Round	Hinkerode	15	
2012–13	Regionalliga West (III)	24	19	2	3	80	30	56	1st	Did not qualify	Westphalian Cup	Winner	Hoppius	16	
2013–14	2. Bundesliga South (II)	22	10	3	9	37	29	33	6th	Third Round			Grünheid	10	
2014–15	2. Bundesliga North (II)	22	8	7	7	40	44	31	7th	Second Round			Grünheid	13	(Note: The VfL Bochum did not apply for a license to play in the 2015–16 2. Bundesliga season, thus the team was relegated to the Regionalliga West.)
2015–16	Regionalliga West (III)	26	13	5	8	56	48	44	4th	First Round	Westphalian Cup	Quarter-finals	Kalamanda	14	
2016–17	Regionalliga West (III)	26	11	6	9	63	40	39	6th	Did not qualify	Westphalian Cup	Winner	Kalamanda	15	
2017–18	Regionalliga West (III)	26	16	4	6	79	37	42	2nd	First Round	Westphalian Cup	Second Round	Wilhelm	15	
2018–19	Regionalliga West (III)	26	12	4	10	79	50	40	5th	Did not qualify	Westphalian Cup	Second Round	Kilic	22	
2019–20	Regionalliga West (III)	16	8	4	4	44	24	28	4th	Did not qualify	Westphalian Cup	Semi-finals	Demirönal	10	(Note: Due to the COVID-19 pandemic the 2019–20 Frauen-Regionalliga West season was abandoned after the 16th matchday.)
2020–21	Regionalliga West (III)	5	5	0	0	25	3	15	2nd	Second Round	Westphalian Cup	Not held	Radke	7	(Note: Due to the COVID-19 pandemic the 2020–21 Frauen-Regionalliga West season was abandoned after the 6th matchday.) (Note: Due to the COVID-19 pandemic the 2020–21 Westphalian Cup season was abandoned, only two matches of the First Round were played.) (Note: To determine the Regionalliga West representative in the 2020–21 Regionalliga promotion playoffs, a qualification round was head between the four clubs who had applied for a license to play in the 2021–22 2. Bundesliga season (Sportfreunde Siegen, 1. FC Köln II, VfL Bochum and 1. FFC Recklinghausen).)
2020–21	Regionalliga West (III)	5	5	0	0	25	3	15	2nd	Second Round	Promotion playoffs qualification	3rd	Radke	7	
2021–22	Regionalliga West (III)	28	20	6	2	88	19	66	2nd	Did not qualify	Westphalian Cup	Runners-up	Radke	17	
2022–23	Regionalliga West (III)	24	13	5	6	57	35	44	2nd	Second Round	Westphalian Cup	Runners-up	Streller	16	
2023–24	Regionalliga West (III)	24	22	2	0	109	12	68	1st	Second Round	Westphalian Cup	Third Round	Hoppius	31	
2023–24	Regionalliga West (III)	24	22	2	0	109	12	68	1st	Second Round	Promotion playoffs	Winner	Hoppius	31	
2024–25	2. Bundesliga (II)								TBD	TBD					
Total		319	193	55	71	884	403	621	As of 20 July 2024						

=== Key ===
- P = Played
- W = Games won
- D = Games drawn
- L = Games lost
- F = Goals for
- A = Goals against
- Pts = Points
- Pos = Final position

Champions	Runners-up	Promoted	Relegated
