= 1977–78 VfL Bochum season =

VfL Bochum
1977–78 season
- President: Ottokar Wüst
- Head Coach: Heinz Höher
- Stadium: Stadion an der Castroper Straße
- Bundesliga: 14th
- DFB-Pokal: Fourth round
- Top goalscorer: League: Hans-Joachim Abel (15); All: Hans-Joachim Abel (15)
- Highest home attendance: 36,000 (vs FC Schalke 04, 11 March 1978)
- Lowest home attendance: 15,000 (vs SV Werder Bremen, 14 January 1978; Fortuna Düsseldorf, 29 April 1978)
- Average home league attendance: 23,971
Home colours	Away colours

The 1977–78 VfL Bochum season was the 40th season in club history.

== Matches ==
=== Legend ===
Win Draw Loss

=== Bundesliga ===
6 August 1977 1	VfL Bochum	0–0	Borussia Mönchengladbach	Bochum
15:30				Stadium: Stadion an der Castroper Straße; Attendance: 22,000; Referee: Paul Kindervater (Cologne)

13 August 1977 2	1. FC Köln	2–1	VfL Bochum	Cologne
15:30	van Gool 28', 44'		Tenhagen 43'	Stadium: Radrennbahn Müngersdorf; Attendance: 18,000; Referee: Jürgen Meßmer (Mannheim)

17 August 1977 3	VfL Bochum	5–0	Hertha BSC	Bochum
20:00	Herget 2'; Woelk 66'; Bast 70', 89'; Gerland 88'			Stadium: Stadion an der Castroper Straße; Attendance: 19,000; Referee: Franz-Josef Hontheim (Trier)

26 August 1977 4	SV Werder Bremen	1–0	VfL Bochum	Bremen
20:00	Røntved 46'			Stadium: Weserstadion; Attendance: 16,000; Referee: Heinz Quindeau (Ludwigshafen)

31 August 1977 5	VfL Bochum	1–2	MSV Duisburg	Bochum
20:00	Holz 74'		Seliger 35'; Büssers 75'	Stadium: Stadion an der Castroper Straße; Attendance: 21,500; Referee: Max Klauser (Munich)

3 September 1977 6	FC Bayern Munich	1–1	VfL Bochum	Munich
15:30	Müller 61' (pen.)		Tenhagen 12'	Stadium: Olympiastadion; Attendance: 19,300; Referee: Medardus Luca (Völklingen)

10 September 1977 7	VfL Bochum	2–0	TSV 1860 Munich	Bochum
15:30	Trimhold 1'; Holz 40'			Stadium: Stadion an der Castroper Straße; Attendance: 18,000; Referee: Jörg Glasneck (Bremen)

17 September 1977 8	Eintracht Braunschweig	3–1	VfL Bochum	Braunschweig
15:30	Breitner 14' (pen.); Frank 27'; Merkhoffer 74'		Bast 18'	Stadium: Eintracht-Stadion; Attendance: 16,000; Referee: Manfred Dölfel (Fürth)

24 September 1977 9	VfL Bochum	0–1	Eintracht Frankfurt	Bochum
15:30			Wenzel 58'	Stadium: Stadion an der Castroper Straße; Attendance: 23,000; Referee: Walter Niemann (Hamburg)

30 September 1977 10	1. FC Saarbrücken	0–1	VfL Bochum	Saarbrücken
20:00			Eggert 20'	Stadium: Ludwigsparkstadion; Attendance: 25,000; Referee: Rudolf Frickel (Munich)

12 October 1977 11	VfL Bochum	0–1	1. FC Kaiserslautern	Bochum
20:00			Riedl 83'	Stadium: Stadion an der Castroper Straße; Attendance: 24,000; Referee: Horst Joos (Stuttgart)

22 October 1977 12	FC Schalke 04	3–1	VfL Bochum	Gelsenkirchen
15:30	Demange 24'; Fischer 31'; Bittcher 44'		Lameck 78' (pen.)	Stadium: Parkstadion; Attendance: 30,000; Referee: Peter Drescher (Augsburg)

29 October 1977 13	VfL Bochum	1–0	VfB Stuttgart	Bochum
15:30	Lameck 9'			Stadium: Stadion an der Castroper Straße; Attendance: 20,000; Referee: Franz-Josef Hontheim (Trier)

5 November 1977 14	Hamburger SV	3–1	VfL Bochum	Hamburg
15:30	Keller 20', 53'; Hidien 82'		Eggert 56'	Stadium: Volksparkstadion; Attendance: 19,000; Referee: Medardus Luca (Völklingen)

12 November 1977 15	FC St. Pauli	1–1	VfL Bochum	Hamburg
15:30	Gerber 14' (pen.)		Abel 56'	Stadium: Wilhelm-Koch-Stadion; Attendance: 5,000; Referee: Winfried Walz (Waiblingen)

26 November 1977 16	VfL Bochum	1–0	Borussia Dortmund	Bochum
15:30	Bast 58'			Stadium: Stadion an der Castroper Straße; Attendance: 35,000; Referee: Ferdinand Biwersi (Bliesransbach)

3 December 1977 17	Fortuna Düsseldorf	1–1	VfL Bochum	Düsseldorf
15:30	Zimmermann 24'		Holz 60'	Stadium: Rheinstadion; Attendance: 13,000; Referee: Jürgen Walther (Würzburg)

9 December 1977 18	Borussia Mönchengladbach	2–2	VfL Bochum	Mönchengladbach
20:00	Simonsen 11', 88'		Abel 32'; Bast 48'	Stadium: Bökelbergstadion; Attendance: 20,000; Referee: Klaus Ohmsen (Hamburg)

17 December 1977 19	VfL Bochum	0–0	1. FC Köln	Bochum
15:30				Stadium: Stadion an der Castroper Straße; Attendance: 33,000; Referee: Manfred Dölfel (Fürth)

7 January 1978 20	Hertha BSC	4–3	VfL Bochum	West Berlin
15:30	Kristensen 39'; Kliemann 49'; Granitza 50', 51'		Abel 30' (pen.), 36', 76'	Stadium: Olympiastadion; Attendance: 14,000; Referee: Heinz Quindeau (Ludwigshafen)

14 January 1978 21	VfL Bochum	2–0	SV Werder Bremen	Bochum
15:30	Abel 86'; Lameck 88'			Stadium: Stadion an der Castroper Straße; Attendance: 15,000; Referee: Eberhard Schmoock (Reichenau)

21 January 1978 22	MSV Duisburg	0–0	VfL Bochum	Duisburg
15:30				Stadium: Wedaustadion; Attendance: 17,000; Referee: Paul Kindervater (Cologne)

28 January 1978 23	VfL Bochum	2–1	FC Bayern Munich	Bochum
15:30	Bast 75', 85'		Rausch 88'	Stadium: Stadion an der Castroper Straße; Attendance: 31,000; Referee: Walter Engel (Reimsbach)

4 February 1978 24	TSV 1860 Munich	2–0	VfL Bochum	Munich
15:30	Hartwig 79'; Hofeditz 90'			Stadium: Olympiastadion; Attendance: 20,000; Referee: Klaus Ohmsen (Hamburg)

11 February 1978 25	VfL Bochum	1–1	Eintracht Braunschweig	Bochum
15:30	Woelk 1'		Grobe 35'	Stadium: Stadion an der Castroper Straße; Attendance: 16,000; Referee: Jürgen Meßmer (Mannheim)

18 February 1978 26	Eintracht Frankfurt	5–3	VfL Bochum	Frankfurt am Main
15:30	Nickel 10', 69' (pen.); Hölzenbein 32', 42'; Neuberger 86'		Abel 16'; Bast 26'; Herget 82'	Stadium: Waldstadion; Attendance: 7,500; Referee: Franz-Josef Hontheim (Trier)

25 March 1978 27	VfL Bochum	4–2	1. FC Saarbrücken	Bochum
15:30	Versen 27'; Abel 47', 58'; Wischniewski 72'		Woelk 2' (o.g.); Denz 70'	Stadium: Stadion an der Castroper Straße; Attendance: 30,000; Referee: Klaus Ohmsen (Hamburg)

3 March 1978 28	1. FC Kaiserslautern	4–1	VfL Bochum	Kaiserslautern
20:00	Stickel 3'; Toppmöller 74', 78', 84'		Bast 9'	Stadium: Betzenbergstadion; Attendance: 20,000; Referee: Walter Niemann (Hamburg)

11 March 1978 29	VfL Bochum	1–1	FC Schalke 04	Bochum
15:30	Abel 54'		Fischer 41'	Stadium: Stadion an der Castroper Straße; Attendance: 36,000; Referee: Udo Zuchantke (West Berlin)

17 March 1978 30	VfB Stuttgart	3–1	VfL Bochum	Stuttgart
20:00	Hoeneß 28'; Müller 39', 47' (pen.)		Abel 15' (pen.)	Stadium: Neckarstadion; Attendance: 40,000; Referee: Ferdinand Biwersi (Bliesransbach)

31 March 1978 31	VfL Bochum	2–1	Hamburger SV	Bochum
20:00	Trimhold 37'; Abel 49'		Volkert 24'	Stadium: Stadion an der Castroper Straße; Attendance: 30,000; Referee: Dieter Dreher (Darmstadt)

8 April 1978 32	VfL Bochum	4–0	FC St. Pauli	Bochum
15:30	Eggert 5'; Holz 71'; Woelk 77' (pen.); Pochstein 90'			Stadium: Stadion an der Castroper Straße; Attendance: 19,000; Referee: Horst Joos (Stuttgart)

22 April 1978 33	Borussia Dortmund	5–3	VfL Bochum	Dortmund
15:30	Frank 6'; Geyer 10'; Burgsmüller 38', 43', 74'		Tenhagen 7'; Abel 52', 62'	Stadium: Westfalenstadion; Attendance: 31,394; Referee: Gert Meuser (Ingelheim)

29 April 1978 34	VfL Bochum	2–1	Fortuna Düsseldorf	Bochum
15:30	Trimhold 46'; Abel 50' (pen.)		Allofs 32'	Stadium: Stadion an der Castroper Straße; Attendance: 15,000; Referee: Eckhard Jensen (Kiel)

=== DFB-Pokal ===
29 July 1977 R1	VfB Oldenburg	0–2	VfL Bochum	Oldenburg
			Woelk 14', 70'	Stadium: Marschweg-Stadion; Attendance: 8,000; Referee: Walter Niemann (Hamburg)

20 August 1977 R2	FC St. Pauli	0–3	VfL Bochum	Hamburg
			Bast 35'; Pochstein 63'; Woelk 70'	Stadium: Wilhelm-Koch-Stadion; Attendance: 6,000; Referee: Dieter Dreher (Darmstadt)

15 October 1977 R3	Freiburger FC	2–6	VfL Bochum	Freiburg
	Derigs 58'; Bruder 81'		Schwemmle 14', 37', 59'; Bast 21', 34'; Holz 71'	Stadium: Möslestadion; Attendance: 10,000; Referee: Dieter Michel (Augsburg)

19 November 1977 R4	Borussia Mönchengladbach	3–0	VfL Bochum	Mönchengladbach
	Heynckes 55', 58', 87'			Stadium: Bökelbergstadion; Attendance: 12,000; Referee: Heinz Aldinger (Waiblingen)

== Squad ==
=== Squad and statistics ===
==== Squad, appearances and goals scored ====
No.	Pos	Nat	Player	Total		Bundesliga		DFB-Pokal	
No.	Pos	Nat	Player	Apps	Goals	Apps	Goals	Apps	Goals
	FW	(West Germany) FRG	Hans-Joachim Abel (since 25 October 1977)	21	15	20	15	1	0
	MF	(West Germany) FRG	Dieter Bast	32	11	28	9	4	2
	FW	(West Germany) FRG	Heinz-Werner Eggeling	1	0	1	0	0	0
	DF	(West Germany) FRG	Michael Eggert	36	3	32	3	4	0
	MF	(West Germany) FRG	Wolfgang Euteneuer	0	0	0	0	0	0
	DF	(West Germany) FRG	Klaus Franke	31	0	27	0	4	0
	DF	(West Germany) FRG	Hartmut Fromm (until 31 August 1977)	3	0	2	0	1	0
	DF	(West Germany) FRG	Hermann Gerland	32	1	30	1	2	0
	DF	(West Germany) FRG	Matthias Herget	34	2	30	2	4	0
	MF	(West Germany) FRG	Paul Holz	31	5	28	4	3	1
	FW	(West Germany) FRG	Josef Kaczor	2	0	1	0	1	0
	MF	(West Germany) FRG	Hans-Jürgen Köper	0	0	0	0	0	0
	FW	(West Germany) FRG	Peter Kursinski	2	0	2	0	0	0
	DF	(West Germany) FRG	Michael Lameck	38	3	34	3	4	0
	GK	(West Germany) FRG	Reinhard Mager	3	0	3	0	0	0
	FW	(West Germany) FRG	Hans-Joachim Pochstein	18	1	14	1	4	0
	MF	(West Germany) FRG	Werner Schachten	0	0	0	0	0	0
	FW	(West Germany) FRG	Ralf Schaffeld	1	0	1	0	0	0
	GK	(West Germany) FRG	Werner Scholz	35	0	31	0	4	0
	FW	(West Germany) FRG	Dieter Schwemmle	18	3	15	0	3	3
	MF	(West Germany) FRG	Franz-Josef Tenhagen	37	3	34	3	3	0
	MF	(West Germany) FRG	Holger Trimhold	38	3	34	3	4	0
	DF	(West Germany) FRG	Dieter Versen	16	1	15	1	1	0
	DF	(West Germany) FRG	Klaus Wischniewski	12	1	12	1	0	0
	DF	(West Germany) FRG	Lothar Woelk	37	6	33	3	4	3

=== Transfers ===
==== Summer ====
In:

No.	Pos.	Nation	Player
—	FW	FRG	Hans-Joachim Abel (from SC Westfalia Herne)
—	MF	FRG	Dieter Bast (from Rot-Weiss Essen)
—	MF	FRG	Ralf Schaffeld (from Rheingold Emmerich)
—	FW	FRG	Dieter Schwemmle (from AC Bellinzona)
—	DF	FRG	Lothar Woelk (from Eintracht Recklinghausen)

Out:

No.	Pos.	Nation	Player
—	MF	FRG	Werner Balte (retired)
—	DF	FRG	Hartmut Fromm (to SC Westfalia Herne)
