= 1976–77 VfL Bochum season =

VfL Bochum
1976–77 season
- President: Ottokar Wüst
- Head Coach: Heinz Höher
- Stadium: Stadion an der Castroper Straße
- Bundesliga: 15th
- DFB-Pokal: Third round
- Top goalscorer: League: Josef Kaczor (21); All: Josef Kaczor (25)
- Highest home attendance: 25,000 (vs. Borussia Mönchengladbach, 12 March 1977)
- Lowest home attendance: 11,000 (vs. 1. FC Saarbrücken, 15 January 1977)
- Average home league attendance: 16,041
Home colours	Away colours	Third colours

The 1976–77 VfL Bochum season was the 39th season in club history.

== Matches ==
=== Legend ===
Win Draw Loss

=== Bundesliga ===
14 August 1976 1	1. FC Saarbrücken	0–1	VfL Bochum	Saarbrücken
15:30			Trimhold 51'	Stadium: Ludwigsparkstadion; Attendance: 28,000; Referee: Max Klauser (Munich)

5 October 1976 2	VfL Bochum	1–0	Karlsruher SC	Bochum
20:00	Tenhagen 43'			Stadium: Stadion an der Castroper Straße; Attendance: 13,000; Referee: Herbert Lutz (Bremen)

28 August 1976 3	Borussia Mönchengladbach	4–2	VfL Bochum	Mönchengladbach
15:30	Bonhof 31'; Heynckes 58', 62', 85'		Kaczor 30', 60'	Stadium: Bökelbergstadion; Attendance: 22,300; Referee: Horst Joos (Stuttgart)

3 September 1976 4	VfL Bochum	2–1	MSV Duisburg	Bochum
20:00	Trimhold 16', 19'		Thies 13'	Stadium: Stadion an der Castroper Straße; Attendance: 16,700; Referee: Manfred Dölfel (Fürth)

11 September 1976 5	Hertha BSC	2–0	VfL Bochum	West Berlin
15:30	Kliemann 20'; Grau 85'			Stadium: Olympiastadion; Attendance: 18,000; Referee: Volker Roth (Salzgitter)

18 September 1976 6	VfL Bochum	5–6	FC Bayern Munich	Bochum
15:30	Ellbracht 24', 43'; Kaczor 38', 80'; Pochstein 53'		Rummenigge 55'; Schwarzenbeck 57'; Müller 63', 74' (pen.); Hoeneß 75', 89'	Stadium: Stadion an der Castroper Straße; Attendance: 17,000; Referee: Walter Horstmann (Hildesheim)

25 September 1976 7	VfL Bochum	2–1	Borussia Dortmund	Bochum
15:30	Ellbracht 5', 38'		Segler 55'	Stadium: Stadion an der Castroper Straße; Attendance: 17,000; Referee: Jürgen Meßmer (Mannheim)

1 October 1976 8	SV Werder Bremen	2–0	VfL Bochum	Bremen
20:00	Röber 40'; Kamp 47'			Stadium: Weserstadion; Attendance: 15,000; Referee: Eberhard Schmoock (Reichenau)

9 October 1976 9	VfL Bochum	1–0	1. FC Kaiserslautern	Bochum
15:30	Kaczor 15'			Stadium: Stadion an der Castroper Straße; Attendance: 14,000; Referee: Udo Zuchantke (West Berlin)

23 October 1976 10	Rot-Weiss Essen	3–3	VfL Bochum	Essen
15:30	Bast 39'; Hrubesch 48', 52' (pen.)		Kaczor 4', 68'; Eggeling 9'	Stadium: Georg-Melches-Stadion; Attendance: 15,000; Referee: Ferdinand Biwersi (Bliesransbach)

30 October 1976 11	VfL Bochum	3–1	Eintracht Frankfurt	Bochum
15:30	Tenhagen 9'; Eggert 73'; Köper 79'		Nickel 78'	Stadium: Stadion an der Castroper Straße; Attendance: 13,000; Referee: Peter Gabor (West Berlin)

6 November 1976 12	Fortuna Düsseldorf	1–0	VfL Bochum	Rheinstadion
15:30	Szymanek 11'			Stadium: Düsseldorf; Attendance: 15,000; Referee: Max Klauser (Munich)

13 November 1976 13	VfL Bochum	1–1	Eintracht Braunschweig	Bochum
15:30	Trimhold 84'		Grobe 31'	Stadium: Stadion an der Castroper Straße; Attendance: 15,000; Referee: Jürgen Walther (Würzburg)

20 November 1976 14	Tennis Borussia Berlin	1–1	VfL Bochum	West Berlin
15:30	Wendt 78'		Kaczor 20'	Stadium: Olympiastadion; Attendance: 9,500; Referee: Walter Horstmann (Hildesheim)

27 November 1976 15	VfL Bochum	1–2	1. FC Köln	Bochum
15:30	Fromm 44'		Müller 63'; Flohe 73'	Stadium: Stadion an der Castroper Straße; Attendance: 17,000; Referee: Hermann Schröder (Lahnstein)

4 December 1976 16	FC Schalke 04	3–1	VfL Bochum	Gelsenkirchen
15:30	Lütkebohmert 6'; E. Kremers 76', 78'		Trimhold 73'	Stadium: Parkstadion; Attendance: 25,000; Referee: Walter Engel (Reimsbach)

10 December 1976 17	VfL Bochum	4–2	Hamburger SV	Bochum
20:00	Köper 1'; Kaczor 25', 37', 73'		Steffenhagen 35', 55'	Stadium: Stadion an der Castroper Straße; Attendance: 15,000; Referee: Eberhard Schmoock (Reichenau)

15 January 1977 18	VfL Bochum	1–2	1. FC Saarbrücken	Bochum
15:30	Kaczor 30'		Förster 40'; Ellbracht 44'	Stadium: Stadion an der Castroper Straße; Attendance: 11,000; Referee: Walter Horstmann (Hildesheim)

22 January 1977 19	Karlsruher SC	2–1	VfL Bochum	Karlsruhe
15:30	Bredenfeld 36'; Berger 90'		Kaczor 26'	Stadium: Wildparkstadion; Attendance: 18,000; Referee: Volker Roth (Salzgitter)

29 January 1977 20	VfL Bochum	0–0	Borussia Mönchengladbach	Bochum
15:30				Stadium: Stadion an der Castroper Straße; Attendance: 25,000; Referee: Wilfried Haselberger (Reutlingen)

5 February 1977 21	MSV Duisburg	0–0	VfL Bochum	Duisburg
15:30				Stadium: Wedaustadion; Attendance: 22,000; Referee: Heinz Quindeau (Ludwigshafen)

12 February 1977 22	VfL Bochum	4–2	Hertha BSC	Bochum
15:30	Kaczor 7', 9', 30'; Trimhold 83'		Grau 8'; Granitza 73'	Stadium: Stadion an der Castroper Straße; Attendance: Herbert Lutz (Bremen); Referee: 18,000

26 February 1977 23	FC Bayern Munich	1–1	VfL Bochum	Munich
15:30	Künkel 26'		Kaczor 13'	Stadium: Olympiastadion; Attendance: 16,000; Referee: Walter Niemann (Hamburg)

5 March 1977 24	Borussia Dortmund	0–2	VfL Bochum	Dortmund
15:30			Kaczor 18'; Eggert 76'	Stadium: Westfalenstadion; Attendance: 47,500; Referee: Klaus Ohmsen (Hamburg)

12 March 1977 25	VfL Bochum	0–2	SV Werder Bremen	Bochum
15:30			Röber 22'; Meininger 86'	Stadium: Stadion an der Castroper Straße; Attendance: 18,000; Referee: Winfried Walz (Waiblingen)

18 March 1977 26	1. FC Kaiserslautern	2–0	VfL Bochum	Kaiserslautern
20:00	Meier 75'; Schwarz 78'			Stadium: Betzenbergstadion; Attendance: 20,000; Referee: Wilfried Haselberger (Reutlingen)

26 March 1977 27	VfL Bochum	2–1	Rot-Weiss Essen	Bochum
15:30	Kaczor 62'; Holz 63'		Lund 67'	Stadium: Stadion an der Castroper Straße; Attendance: 16,000; Referee: Dieter Dreher (Darmstadt)

2 April 1977 28	Eintracht Frankfurt	2–2	VfL Bochum	Frankfurt am Main
15:30	Nickel 15'; Kraus 44'		Tenhagen 42'; Lameck 69' (pen.)	Stadium: Waldstadion; Attendance: 21,000; Referee: Jan Redelfs (Hannover)

12 April 1977 29	VfL Bochum	1–2	Fortuna Düsseldorf	Bochum
20:00	Eggeling 28'		Zewe 67'; Allofs 79'	Stadium: Stadion an der Castroper Straße; Attendance: 15,000; Referee: Walter Horstmann (Hildesheim)

16 April 1977 30	Eintracht Braunschweig	2–0	VfL Bochum	Braunschweig
15:30	Popivoda 40'; Frank 65'			Stadium: Eintracht-Stadion; Attendance: 15,000; Referee: Rudolf Frickel (Munich)

22 April 1977 31	VfL Bochum	2–1	Tennis Borussia Berlin	Bochum
20:00	Kaczor 52'; Lameck 65'		Stradt 72'	Stadium: Stadion an der Castroper Straße; Attendance: 12,000; Referee: Jürgen Walther (Würzburg)

6 May 1977 32	1. FC Köln	6–1	VfL Bochum	Cologne
20:00	Müller 15', 19', 42', 43'; Flohe 33'; Simmet 60'		Kaczor 85'	Stadium: Radrennbahn Müngersdorf; Attendance: 12,000; Referee: Gert Meuser (Ingelheim)

14 May 1977 33	VfL Bochum	1–2	FC Schalke 04	Bochum
15:30	Eggert 11'		Gerland 34' (o.g.); Lander 89'	Stadium: Stadion an der Castroper Straße; Attendance: 20,000; Referee: Wolf-Dieter Ahlenfelder (Oberhausen)

21 May 1977 34	Hamburger SV	5–1	VfL Bochum	Hamburg
15:30	Reimann 22', 30'; Magath 49'; Eigl 73', 85'		Trimhold 74'	Stadium: Volksparkstadion; Attendance: 19,000; Referee: Udo Zuchantke (West Berlin)

=== DFB-Pokal ===
6 August 1976 R1	Spvg Steinhagen	0–3	VfL Bochum	Steinhagen
			Kaczor 15', 87'; Pochstein 67'	Stadium: Cronsbachstadion; Attendance: 5,000; Referee: Dieter Gabriel (Springe)

16 October 1976 R2	SV Bremerhaven 1893	1–3	VfL Bochum	Bremerhaven
	Scherff 82'		Ellbracht 6'; Gerland 31'; Kaczor 54'	Stadium: Zollinland; Attendance: 8,500; Referee: Eckhard Jensen (Kiel)

18 December 1976 R3	Rot-Weiss Essen	5–1	VfL Bochum	Essen
	Wieczorkowski 7'; Hrubesch 16'; Neues 53'; Lorant 85'; Mill 87'		Kaczor 23'	Stadium: Georg-Melches-Stadion; Attendance: 11,500; Referee: Gert Meuser (Ingelheim)

== Squad ==
=== Squad and statistics ===
==== Squad, appearances and goals scored ====
No.	Pos	Nat	Player	Total		Bundesliga		DFB-Pokal	
No.	Pos	Nat	Player	Apps	Goals	Apps	Goals	Apps	Goals
	MF	(West Germany) FRG	Werner Balte	12	0	10	0	2	0
	FW	(West Germany) FRG	Heinz-Werner Eggeling	14	2	13	2	1	0
	DF	(West Germany) FRG	Michael Eggert	32	3	32	3	0	0
	FW	(West Germany) FRG	Harry Ellbracht (until 20 October 1976)	8	5	6	4	2	1
	MF	(West Germany) FRG	Wolfgang Euteneuer	5	0	3	0	2	0
	DF	(West Germany) FRG	Klaus Franke	30	0	29	0	1	0
	DF	(West Germany) FRG	Hartmut Fromm	19	1	17	1	2	0
	DF	(West Germany) FRG	Hermann Gerland	35	1	32	0	3	1
	DF	(West Germany) FRG	Matthias Herget	37	0	34	0	3	0
	MF	(West Germany) FRG	Paul Holz	18	1	17	1	1	0
	FW	(West Germany) FRG	Josef Kaczor	37	25	34	21	3	4
	MF	(West Germany) FRG	Hans-Jürgen Köper	23	2	20	2	3	0
	FW	(West Germany) FRG	Peter Kursinski	4	0	4	0	0	0
	DF	(West Germany) FRG	Michael Lameck	33	2	30	2	3	0
	GK	(West Germany) FRG	Reinhard Mager	1	0	1	0	0	0
	DF	(West Germany) FRG	Erich Miß	5	0	5	0	0	0
	FW	(West Germany) FRG	Hans-Joachim Pochstein	35	2	32	1	3	1
	MF	(West Germany) FRG	Werner Schachten	0	0	0	0	0	0
	GK	(West Germany) FRG	Werner Scholz	36	0	33	0	3	0
	MF	(West Germany) FRG	Franz-Josef Tenhagen	37	3	34	3	3	0
	MF	(West Germany) FRG	Holger Trimhold	34	7	32	7	2	0
	DF	(West Germany) FRG	Dieter Versen	0	0	0	0	0	0

=== Transfers ===
==== Summer ====
In:

No.	Pos.	Nation	Player
—	DF	FRG	Matthias Herget (SC Gelsenkirchen 07)
—	MF	FRG	Paul Holz (from Hannover 96)
—	MF	FRG	Werner Schachten (from FC Paderborn)

Out:

No.	Pos.	Nation	Player
—	DF	FRG	Klaus-Dieter Dewinski (to Bonner SC)

==== Winter ====
In:

No.	Pos.	Nation	Player

Out:

No.	Pos.	Nation	Player
—	FW	FRG	Harry Ellbracht (to 1. FC Saarbrücken)
