= Mutzel =

Mutzel or Mützel is a surname. Notable people with the name include:

- Gustav Mützel (1839–1893), German artist, famous for his mammal and bird paintings
- Michael Mutzel (born 1979), German football midfielder
- Petra Mutzel, German computer scientist
- Sebastian Mützel (born 1989), German footballer
