= Manuel Bölstler =

German footballer

Personal information
- Date of birth: 26 April 1983 (age 43)
- Place of birth: Tübingen, West Germany
- Height: 1.83 m (6 ft 0 in)
- Position: Defensive midfielder

Senior career*
Years	Team	Apps	(Gls)
2001–2002	VfB Stuttgart II	1	(0)
2002–2005	Cambuur	36	(2)
2005–2006	Darmstadt 98	28	(0)
2006–2008	Wuppertaler SV	56	(7)
2008–2009	Rot Weiss Ahlen	9	(0)
2009–2010	Rot-Weiß Erfurt	28	(2)
2010–2011	Arminia Bielefeld	12	(0)
2011–2012	Hapoel Kfar Saba	26	(1)
2012–2013	Karlsruher SC	0	(0)
2013–2014	FC Gütersloh	21	(1)
2014–2015	Westfalia Herne	19	(0)
2015–2016	Wuppertaler SV	0	(0)
Total		236	(13)

Managerial career
- 2014: Westfalia Herne (player-manager)
- 2014–2015: Westfalia Herne (player-assistant)
- 2015–2016: Wuppertaler SV (player-assistant)
- 2015–2019: Wuppertaler SV (sporting director)
- * Club domestic league appearances and goals

Manuel Bölstler (born 26 April 1983) is a German former professional footballer who played as a defensive midfielder.
