= Lutz Gerresheim =

German footballer (1958–1980)

Personal information
- Date of birth: 19 September 1958
- Date of death: 10 March 1980 (aged 21)
- Place of death: Bochum, West Germany
- Position: Midfielder

Youth career
- 1964–1976: Westfalia Herne

Senior career*
| Years | Team | Apps | (Gls) |
| 1976–1979 | Westfalia Herne | 86 | (11) |
| 1979–1980 | VfL Bochum | 5 | (0) |
| Total | | 91 | (11) |

International career
| | West Germany U19 | 20 | (10) |
- * Club domestic league appearances and goals

Lutz Gerresheim (born 19 September 1958 – 10 March 1980) was a German footballer who played as a midfielder.

== Career statistics ==
| Club performance | | | League | | Cup | | Total | |
| Season | Club | League | Apps | Goals | Apps | Goals | Apps | Goals |
| West Germany | | | League | | DFB-Pokal | | Total | |
|---|---|---|---|---|---|---|---|---|
| 1976–77 | Westfalia Herne | 2. Bundesliga | 19 | 3 | 0 | 0 | 19 | 3 |
| 1977–78 | Westfalia Herne | 2. Bundesliga | 31 | 4 | 5 | 2 | 36 | 6 |
| 1978–79 | Westfalia Herne | 2. Bundesliga | 36 | 4 | 2 | 1 | 38 | 5 |
| 1979–80 | VfL Bochum | Bundesliga | 5 | 0 | 2 | 0 | 7 | 0 |
| Total | West Germany | | 91 | 11 | 9 | 3 | 100 | 14 |
| Career total | | | 91 | 11 | 9 | 3 | 100 | 14 |
