= Walter Bechtold =

German footballer

Personal information
- Date of birth: 25 July 1947 (age 79)
- Place of birth: Frankfurt, Germany
- Height: 1.76 m (5 ft 9 in)
- Position: Midfielder

Senior career*
| Years | Team | Apps | (Gls) |
| 1965–1969 | Eintracht Frankfurt | 74 | (33) |
| 1969–1972 | Kickers Offenbach | | |
| 1973–1980 | SV Darmstadt 98 | | |
- * Club domestic league appearances and goals

Walter Bechtold (born 25 July 1947) is a German former professional footballer.

== Career ==
Bechtold began his professional career in 1965 with Eintracht Frankfurt. On November 20, 1965, in a 6–1 away victory against Borussia Neunkirchen, he became the youngest Bundesliga player to score a hat-trick, aged 18 years and 118 days. The midfielder scored 33 goals in his four years with the club, but was never a first-team regular.

In 1969, he transferred to local rivals Kickers Offenbach in the Regionalliga. With Kickers he had his most successful season; the club being promoted to the top flight as champions and winning the DFB Cup against 1. FC Köln. This saw the team qualify for the next season's European Cup Winners' Cup, where they were knocked out in the first round by Belgian side Club Brugge K.V. Bechtold played for a year in the Bundesliga with Offenbach before being relegated back to the regional league. After one season back in the lower division, he moved to SV Darmstadt 98. He returned once again to the Bundesliga in 1978 with Darmstadt, before being relegated once more a year later. He retired from playing in 1980. During his professional career, Bechtold played in 131 Bundesliga matches, scoring 45 goals.

== Honours ==
- UEFA Intertoto Cup: 1966–67
