= Frank Saborowski =

German footballer

Personal information
- Full name: Frank Saborowski
- Date of birth: 14 March 1958 (age 68)
- Height: 1.78 m (5 ft 10 in)
- Position: Defender

Senior career*
Years	Team	Apps	(Gls)
1979–1982	MSV Duisburg	72	(2)
1982–1984	Bayer 04 Leverkusen	41	(0)
1985	VfL Bochum	5	(0)
1985–1986	MSV Duisburg	30	(0)
1986–1989	Rot-Weiss Essen	52	(0)

International career
1980	West Germany B	2	(0)
- * Club domestic league appearances and goals

Frank Saborowski (born 14 March 1958) is a retired German football defender.
