= Eggeling =

Eggeling is a Germanic surname. It may refer to:

- Dale Eggeling (born 1954), American golfer
- Frank Eggeling (born 1963) German footballer
- Julius Eggeling (1842–1918), Scottish professor of Sanskrit, translator, and editor
- Heinz-Werner Eggeling (born 1955), German footballer
- Joachim Albrecht Eggeling (1884–1945), German Nazi SS officer
- Viking Eggeling (1880–1925), Swedish avant-garde artist and filmmaker
- William Julius Eggeling (1909–1994), Scottish forester, botanist and naturalist
