= Harry Ellbracht =

German footballer

Personal information
- Full name: Harry Ellbracht
- Date of birth: 13 September 1953 (age 73)
- Place of birth: Kamen, West Germany
- Position: Forward

Youth career
- –1972: SV Kamen

Senior career*
Years	Team	Apps	(Gls)
1972–1973	Arminia Gütersloh		
1973–1975	SSV Hagen		
1975–1976	VfL Bochum	21	(8)
1976–1978	1. FC Saarbrücken	58	(12)
1978–1979	Arminia Bielefeld	26	(6)
1979–1981	TSV 1860 Munich	14	(4)
1981–1986	SC Eintracht Hamm		
1986–1987	FC Gütersloh		
- * Club domestic league appearances and goals

Harry Ellbracht (born 13 September 1953) is a retired German football forward.
