= Sebastian Mützel =

German footballer

Personal information
- Date of birth: 6 August 1989 (age 37)
- Place of birth: Bad Tölz, West Germany
- Height: 1.85 m (6 ft 1 in)
- Position: Forward

Team information
- Current team: TuS Bövinghausen
- Number: 13

Youth career
- Lenggrieser SC
- 1860 Munich
- TSV 1860 Rosenheim
- –2008: SpVgg Unterhaching

Senior career*
Years	Team	Apps	(Gls)
2008–2011	SpVgg Unterhaching II	74	(27)
2008–2011	SpVgg Unterhaching	15	(1)
2011–2012	1. FC Nürnberg II	31	(5)
2012–2014	Rot-Weiß Oberhausen	49	(8)
2013–2014	Rot-Weiß Oberhausen II	3	(0)
2014–2015	SC Westfalia Herne	31	(4)
2015–2016	SV Zweckel	14	(3)
2016–2018	SC Westfalia Herne	29	(13)
2018–2019	Rot Weiss Ahlen	32	(5)
2019–	TuS Bövinghausen	36	(26)
- * Club domestic league appearances and goals as of 12 November 2022

Sebastian Mützel (born 9 August 1989) is a German footballer who plays for TuS Bövinghausen.
