= Reinhold Zagorny =

German footballer

Personal information
- Full name: Reinhold Zagorny
- Date of birth: 30 September 1956 (age 70)
- Position: Midfielder

Senior career*
Years	Team	Apps	(Gls)
1981–1983	VfL Bochum	16	(0)
1981–1985	VfL Bochum II		
1985–1986	SpVgg Erkenschwick	30	(12)
1986–	1. FC Recklinghausen		
–1991	Rot-Weiß Lüdenscheid		
1991–	FSV Gevelsberg		
- * Club domestic league appearances and goals

Reinhold Zagorny (born 30 September 1956) is a retired German football midfielder.
