= Paul Hahn =

German footballer (born 1949)

Personal information
- Date of birth: 16 January 1949 (age 76)
- Place of birth: Sonsbeck, Germany
- Position(s): Sweeper, centre-back

Senior career*
Years	Team	Apps	(Gls)
1967–1970	SV Sonsbeck		
1970–1971	TuS Lintfort		
1971–1981	Bayer 05 Uerdingen	215	(9)
1981–1982	Chicago Sting	44	(2)
1982–1986	Rot-Weiß Oberhausen	103	(3)
- * Club domestic league appearances and goals

Paul Hahn (born 16 January 1949) is a German former professional footballer who played as a sweeper or centre-back.

== Career ==
Hahn started his career with German side SV Sonsbeck. In 1970, he signed for German side TuS Lintfort. In 1971, he signed for German side Bayer 05 Uerdingen, where he captained the club and helped them reach the semi-finals of the 1976–77 DFB-Pokal and achieve promotion from the second tier to the top flight .

In 1981, he signed for American side Chicago Sting, where he helped the club win the league title. In 1982, he signed for German side Rot-Weiß Oberhausen before retiring from professional football.

== Style of play ==
Hahn mainly operated as a sweeper. He was known for his speed, aerial ability, and technical ability.

== Personal life ==
Hahn was born on 16 January 1949 in Sonsbeck, Germany. A native of Sonsbeck, Germany, he is the father of German footballer Jan-Paul Hahn.
