= Ottmar Scheuch =

German footballer

Personal information
- Full name: Ottmar Scheuch
- Date of birth: 29 November 1954 (age 71)
- Position: Forward

Senior career*
Years	Team	Apps	(Gls)
–1979	SpVgg Au/Iller		
1979–1980	VfL Bochum	3	(0)
- * Club domestic league appearances and goals

Ottmar Scheuch (born 29 November 1954) is a retired German football forward.
