= Detlef Jaskowiak =

German footballer

Personal information
- Full name: Detlef Jaskowiak
- Date of birth: 15 February 1959 (age 67)
- Position: Defender

Senior career*
Years	Team	Apps	(Gls)
1979–1980	VfL Bochum	0	(0)
1980–1981	1. FC Bocholt	1	(0)
Total		1	(0)

International career
1975	Germany U16		
- * Club domestic league appearances and goals

Detlef Jaskowiak (born 15 February 1959) is a retired German football defender.

== Career ==
=== Statistics ===
As of 2 February 2013

Club performance			League		Cup		Total	
Season	Club	League	Apps	Goals	Apps	Goals	Apps	Goals
West Germany			League		DFB-Pokal		Total	
1979–80	VfL Bochum	Bundesliga	0	0	1	0	1	0
1980–81	1. FC Bocholt	2. Bundesliga	1	0	0	0	1	0
Total	West Germany		1	0	1	0	2	0
Career total			1	0	1	0	2	0
