= Wolfgang Patzke =

German footballer

Personal information
- Date of birth: 24 February 1959
- Place of birth: Mülheim an der Ruhr, West Germany
- Date of death: 8 May 2016 (aged 57)
- Place of death: Berlin, Germany
- Height: 1.80 m (5 ft 11 in)
- Positions: Midfielder; striker

Senior career*
Years	Team	Apps	(Gls)
1976–1979	Rot-Weiss Essen	44	(2)
1979–1981	SG Wattenscheid 09	70	(9)
1981–1983	VfL Bochum	59	(21)
1983–1986	Bayer 04 Leverkusen	59	(5)
1987–1988	FC Schalke 04	21	(4)
1988–1991	Hertha BSC	58	(7)
- * Club domestic league appearances and goals

Wolfgang Patzke (24 February 1959 – 8 May 2016) was a German football player.
