= Ralf Schaffeld =

German footballer

Personal information
- Full name: Ralf Schaffeld
- Date of birth: 13 April 1959 (age 67)
- Position: Midfielder

Senior career*
| Years | Team | Apps | (Gls) |
| –1977 | Rheingold Emmerich | | |
| 1977–1978 | VfL Bochum | 1 | (0) |
| 1978–1981 | SG Wattenscheid 09 | 38 | (3) |
- * Club domestic league appearances and goals

Ralf Schaffeld (born 13 April 1959) is a retired German football midfielder.
