= Ivan Žugčić =

Croatian footballer (born 1958)

Personal information
- Full name: Ivan Žugčić
- Date of birth: 22 May 1958 (age 68)
- Position: Defender

Youth career
- –1977: DJK Katernberg

Senior career*
Years	Team	Apps	(Gls)
1977–1979	DJK Katernberg		
1979–1980	SG Wattenscheid 09	19	(0)
1980–1987	VfL Bochum	97	(2)
1987–?	SG Wattenscheid 09		
- * Club domestic league appearances and goals

Ivan Žugčić (born 22 May 1958) is a retired Croatian football defender.
