= Dieter Lemke =

German footballer (1956–2015)

Personal information
- Full name: Dieter Lemke
- Date of birth: 14 April 1956
- Date of death: 15 February 2015 (aged 58)
- Height: 1.80 m (5 ft 11 in)
- Position: Forward

Senior career*
Years	Team	Apps	(Gls)
1980–1982	VfL Bochum	27	(1)
1982–1987	SC Fortuna Köln	97	(23)
- * Club domestic league appearances and goals

Dieter Lemke (14 April 1956 – 15 February 2015) was a German football forward.
