= Klaus Wischniewski =

German footballer

Personal information
- Full name: Klaus Wischniewski
- Date of birth: 8 December 1954 (age 71)
- Position: Midfielder

Senior career*
Years	Team	Apps	(Gls)
1977–1978	VfL Bochum	12	(1)
1978–1980	DSC Wanne-Eickel	74	(7)
1980–1981	Rot-Weiß Lüdenscheid	35	(1)
- * Club domestic league appearances and goals

Klaus Wischniewski (born 8 December 1954) is a retired German football midfielder.
