= Ulrich Bittorf =

German footballer

Personal information
- Full name: Ulrich Bittorf
- Date of birth: 2 September 1959 (age 67)
- Height: 1.77 m (5 ft 9 1/2 in)
- Position: Midfielder

Youth career
- –1979: VfL Bochum

Senior career*
Years	Team	Apps	(Gls)
1979–1980	VfL Bochum	1	(0)
1980–1981	SC Herford	40	(5)
1981–1983	VfL Bochum	35	(4)
1983–1984	Bayer 04 Leverkusen	37	(3)
1984–1986	1. FC Nürnberg	43	(9)
1986–1988	Rot-Weiß Oberhausen	68	(5)
1988–1989	Union Solingen	27	(1)
1989–1991	1. FC Bocholt		
1991–1993	Rot-Weiß Oberhausen	39	(3)

International career
1981	West Germany U-21	2	(0)
- * Club domestic league appearances and goals

Ulrich Bittorf (born 2 September 1959) is a retired German football midfielder.
