= Rolf Blau =

German footballer

Personal information
- Date of birth: 21 May 1952 (age 74)
- Height: 1.70 m (5 ft 7 in)
- Position: Midfielder

Senior career*
Years	Team	Apps	(Gls)
1971–1973	Hannover 96	34	(3)
1973–1977	Preußen Münster	100	(25)
1977–1978	FC St. Pauli	34	(1)
1978–1982	VfL Bochum	123	(14)
1982–1984	Hertha BSC	66	(9)
Total		357	(52)

International career
1979–1980	West Germany B	5	(0)
- * Club domestic league appearances and goals

Rolf Blau (born 21 May 1952) is a German former professional footballer who played as a midfielder.
