= Kurt Pinkall =

German footballer

Personal information
- Full name: Kurt Pinkall
- Date of birth: 25 June 1955 (age 71)
- Place of birth: Brockel, West Germany
- Height: 1.81 m (5 ft 11 1/2 in)
- Position: Forward

Senior career*
Years	Team	Apps	(Gls)
1977–1978	RSV Göttingen 05		
1978–1979	FC Viktoria Köln 1904	34	(9)
1979–1981	VfL Bochum	39	(19)
1981–1986	Borussia Mönchengladbach	82	(21)

International career
1981–1982	West Germany B	3	(0)
- * Club domestic league appearances and goals

Kurt Pinkall (born 25 June 1955) is a retired German football forward.
