= Walter Oswald =

Austrian-born German footballer

Personal information
- Date of birth: 8 October 1955 (age 71)
- Place of birth: Linz, Austria
- Height: 1.79 m (5 ft 10 in)
- Positions: Midfielder; defender

Senior career*
Years	Team	Apps	(Gls)
1973–1976	DJK Gütersloh	94	(12)
1976–1978	FC St. Pauli	72	(8)
1978–1991	VfL Bochum	353	(24)
1991–1993	VfL Bochum II		
Medal record
FC St. Pauli
Winner	2. Bundesliga	1976–77
VfL Bochum
Runner-up	DFB-Pokal	1987–88
- * Club domestic league appearances and goals

Walter Oswald (born 8 October 1955) is a German former professional footballer who played as a midfielder or defender.

== Career statistics ==
Appearances and goals by club, season and competition
Club	Season	League			DFB-Pokal		Total	
Club	Season	Division	Apps	Goals	Apps	Goals	Apps	Goals
DJK Gütersloh	1973–74	Regionalliga West	22	3	—		22	3
DJK Gütersloh	1974–75	2. Bundesliga	34	5	1	0	35	5
DJK Gütersloh	1975–76	2. Bundesliga	38	4	3	1	41	5
DJK Gütersloh	Total		94	12	4	1	98	13
FC St. Pauli	1976–77	2. Bundesliga	38	6	2	0	40	6
FC St. Pauli	1977–78	Bundesliga	34	2	2	0	36	2
FC St. Pauli	Total		72	8	4	0	76	8
VfL Bochum	1978–79	Bundesliga	33	3	4	1	37	4
VfL Bochum	1979–80	Bundesliga	27	3	3	1	30	4
VfL Bochum	1980–81	Bundesliga	16	1	4	1	20	2
VfL Bochum	1981–82	Bundesliga	30	4	7	4	37	8
VfL Bochum	1982–83	Bundesliga	32	4	4	0	36	4
VfL Bochum	1983–84	Bundesliga	32	6	1	0	33	6
VfL Bochum	1984–85	Bundesliga	29	1	3	0	32	1
VfL Bochum	1985–86	Bundesliga	31	0	5	0	36	0
VfL Bochum	1986–87	Bundesliga	25	2	1	0	26	2
VfL Bochum	1987–88	Bundesliga	26	0	6	0	32	0
VfL Bochum	1988–89	Bundesliga	24	0	3	0	27	0
VfL Bochum	1989–90	Bundesliga	21	0	0	0	21	0
VfL Bochum	1990–91	Bundesliga	27	0	0	0	27	0
VfL Bochum	Total		353	24	41	7	394	31
VfL Bochum II	1991–92	Oberliga Westfalen			—			
VfL Bochum II	1992–93	Oberliga Westfalen			—			
VfL Bochum II	Total							
Career total					49	8		
