= SC Westfalia Herne =

German football club

- Full name: Sportclub Westfalia 1904 e.V. Herne
- Founded: 13 June 1904
- Ground: Stadion am Schloss Strünkede
- Capacity: 32,000
- Chairman: Uwe Heinecke
- Manager: Christian Knappmann
- League: Westfalenliga 2 (VI)
- 2023–24: Landesliga Westfalen (VII); 1st of 22 (promoted)
| Home colours | Away colours |

SC Westfalia Herne is a German football club based in Herne, North Rhine-Westphalia. The club was founded on 13 June 1904 by the sons of the more well-heeled residents of the city as a rival to the worker-based club SV Sodingen.

== History ==
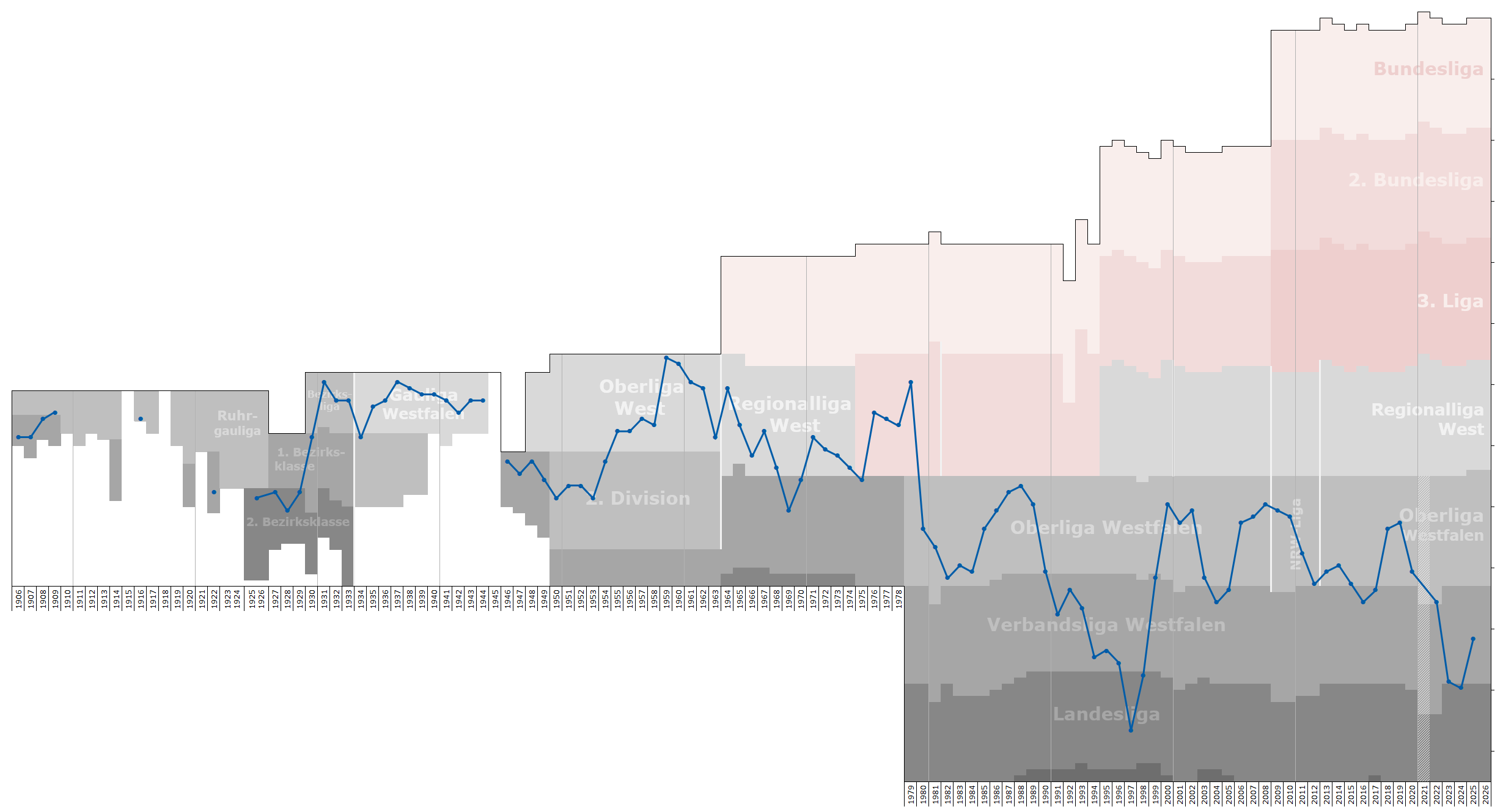
Historical chart of the club's league performance

After World War I and occupation of the Ruhr by the French in 1923, the club was dissolved, but still carried on unofficially. It was reconstituted in 1925 through fusion with Fortuna Herne to play as Westfalia Fortuna Herne. The union was good for the club, which advanced to upper league play in 1930, and made it as far as the semi-finals in the national championship the next season. When German football was reorganized under the Third Reich, Herne was not selected for play in the first tier Gauliga Westfalen, but did manage to play their way into the premier circuit the next year. They competed at that level until the collapse of the league system at the end of World War II.

After the war, Herne again found itself left out of the newly re-organized upper league until they managed to earn promotion in 1954. They then went on to win the Oberliga West in 1959 and finish second in 1960, but did not have much success in the subsequent national championship playoff rounds. Despite delivering consistently solid results in the post-war period, the club missed qualifying for the Bundesliga – Germany's new professional football league – in 1963 with an unexpectedly poor finish in the 1962–63 season that saw the team relegated.

Sixteen years of mediocre play in tiers II and III followed. Sponsorship by petrol company Goldin Imperium helped keep the team in the 2.Bundesliga-Nord through the late 70s as SC Westfalia Goldin Herne. When the firm went bankrupt in late 1979 the club was forced to withdraw after just one match of the 1979–80 season. They picked up play next season in the Amateur Oberliga Westfalen (III) before slipping again, this time to the IV and V level divisions. The club was promoted after the 2005–06 season and played in the Oberliga Westfalen (V). On 22 October 2009 the club announced its bankruptcy through its Chairman Horst Haneke to the media.

Westfalia survived to play in the NRW-Liga from 2008 to 2012 after the Oberliga Westfalen was disbanded. When the latter was reformed in 2012 the club returned to this league where it played until 2015, when it was relegated to the Westfalenliga for finishing at the bottom.

== Honours ==
The club's honours:

- Oberliga West
  - Champions: 1959
- Westphalia Cup
  - Winners: 2006
- Westfalenliga (III/IV/V)
  - Champions: 1970, 1975, 1999, 2005

== Notable players ==
Three players have represented the Germany national team whilst playing for Herne, most notably Hans Tilkowski, who played in the 1966 World Cup final. The other two players are Helmut Benthaus and Alfred Pyka.

Sönke Wortmann, now a famous director in Germany with films like Little Sharks, Der bewegte Mann and especially The Miracle of Bern - a story about a returning soldier in the atmosphere of winning the worldcup by the German Squad in 1954 - played for Westfalia in the season 1980–81. He also is the director of Deutschland: Ein Sommermärchen, a documentary of the German team while the world cup of 2006.

Michael Steinbrecher played for Herne in 1985–86. He now moderates amongst others the well known "Das aktuelle Sportstudio", a sport magazine on Saturday evening.

== In popular culture ==
In the 1980 German movie Theo Against the Rest of the World, starring Marius Müller-Westernhagen, Theo, the main character, has tickets for his "game of the century", a DFB-Pokal match of SC Westfalia Herne versus FC Schalke 04 but misses the game due to his truck being stolen. In reality, there was no such game in this era.

== Squad ==
As of 7 June 2015

Note: Flags indicate national team as defined under FIFA eligibility rules; some limited exceptions apply. Players may hold more than one non-FIFA nationality.

| No. | Pos. | Nation | Player |
|---|---|---|---|
| 1 | GK | (Germany) GER | Benjamin Carpentier |
| 3 | DF | (Germany) GER | Tim Kosien |
| 4 | DF | (Bosnia and Herzegovina) BIH | Stijepan Filipovic |
| 5 | MF | (Poland) POL | Martin Zakrzewski |
| 6 | MF | (Turkey) TUR | Onur Özbicerler |
| 7 | DF | (Germany) GER | Nils Horneffer |
| 8 | MF | (Germany) GER | Semih Aktaş |
| 9 | FW | (Turkey) TUR | Ahmet Inal |
| 10 | MF | (Germany) GER | Bünyamin Karagülmez |
| 11 | MF | (Germany) GER | Dennis Weßendorf |
| 13 | MF | (Germany) GER | Sebastian Mützel |
| 14 | DF | (Democratic Republic of the Congo) COD | Christian Luvuezo |

| No. | Pos. | Nation | Player |
|---|---|---|---|
| 16 | DF | (Germany) GER | Yusuf Kılıç |
| 17 | MF | (Germany) GER | Dennis Gumpert |
| 18 | MF | (Germany) GER | Jean-Pierre Schilling |
| 19 | FW | (Albania) ALB | Fatmir Ferati |
| 20 | MF | (Germany) GER | Samed Sazoğlu |
| 21 | MF | (Turkey) TUR | Enes Kaya |
| 23 | MF | (Germany) GER | Fatlum Zaskoku (captain) |
| 25 | DF | (Germany) GER | Torben Reimann |
| 26 | MF | (Germany) GER | Manuel Bölstler (playing assistant) |
| 33 | GK | (Germany) GER | Sascha Samulewicz |
| — | GK | (Germany) GER | Jan-Niklas Herden |
| — | FW | (Germany) GER | André Stratmann |
