= Lothar Woelk =

German footballer (born 1954)

Personal information
- Date of birth: 3 August 1954 (age 72)
- Place of birth: Recklinghausen, West Germany
- Height: 1.83 m (6 ft 0 in)
- Position: Defender

Youth career
- FC Leusberg
- –1973: Eintracht Recklinghausen

Senior career*
Years	Team	Apps	(Gls)
1973–1977	Eintracht Recklinghausen		
1977–1989	VfL Bochum	385	(26)
1989–1992	MSV Duisburg	99	(6)
- * Club domestic league appearances and goals

Lothar Woelk (born 3 August 1954) is a German former professional footballer who played as a Defender, making 420 appearances in the Bundesliga.

== Career statistics ==
Club performance			League		Cup		Total	
Season	Club	League	Apps	Goals	Apps	Goals	Apps	Goals
West Germany			League		DFB-Pokal		Total	
1973–74	Recklinghausen	Verbandsliga Westfalen			—			
1974–75	Recklinghausen	Landesliga Westfalen			—			
1975–76	Recklinghausen	Landesliga Westfalen			—			
1976–77	Recklinghausen	Verbandsliga Westfalen			—			
1977–78	VfL Bochum	Bundesliga	33	3	4	3	37	6
1978–79	VfL Bochum	Bundesliga	33	3	5	1	38	4
1979–80	VfL Bochum	Bundesliga	34	1	3	0	37	1
1980–81	VfL Bochum	Bundesliga	32	2	4	1	36	3
1981–82	VfL Bochum	Bundesliga	31	1	7	0	38	1
1982–83	VfL Bochum	Bundesliga	34	2	5	1	39	3
1983–84	VfL Bochum	Bundesliga	31	4	1	0	32	4
1984–85	VfL Bochum	Bundesliga	32	1	3	1	35	2
1985–86	VfL Bochum	Bundesliga	29	1	4	0	33	1
1986–87	VfL Bochum	Bundesliga	32	6	1	0	33	6
1987–88	VfL Bochum	Bundesliga	33	1	7	2	40	3
1988–89	VfL Bochum	Bundesliga	31	1	2	0	33	1
1989–90	MSV Duisburg	2. Bundesliga	32	1	4	1	36	2
1990–91	MSV Duisburg	2. Bundesliga	32	1	6	1	38	2
Germany			League		DFB-Pokal		Total	
1991–92	MSV Duisburg	Bundesliga	35	4	1	0	36	4
Total	West Germany				56	11		
Total	Germany		35	4	1	0	36	4
Career total					57	11		

== Honours ==
- DFB-Pokal finalist: 1987–88
