= Werner Schachten =

German footballer

Personal information
- Full name: Werner Schachten
- Date of birth: 16 September 1954 (age 72)
- Position: Midfielder

Senior career*
Years	Team	Apps	(Gls)
–1977	FC Paderborn		
1976–1980	VfL Bochum	3	(0)
- * Club domestic league appearances and goals

Werner Schachten (born 16 September 1954) is a retired German football midfielder.
