= Hans-Joachim Abel =

German footballer

Jochen Abel
Personal information
- Date of birth: 25 June 1952 (age 74)
- Place of birth: Düsseldorf, West Germany
- Height: 1.80 m (5 ft 11 in)
- Position: Forward

Senior career*
Years	Team	Apps	(Gls)
1972–1974	Fortuna Düsseldorf	6	(1)
1974–1977	Westfalia Herne	102	(63)
1977–1982	VfL Bochum	144	(60)
1982–1984	Schalke 04	63	(23)
1984–1987	FC Vaduz		
1987–1991	FC Balzers		

International career
1973	West Germany Olympic	1	(0)

Managerial career
- 1987–1991: FC Balzers
- 1992–1993: FC Vaduz
- * Club domestic league appearances and goals

Hans-Joachim "Jochen" Abel (born 25 June 1952) is a German former professional footballer who played as a forward.

== Biography ==
Born in Düsseldorf, Abel made 183 appearances in the German Bundesliga for Fortuna Düsseldorf, VfL Bochum and Schalke 04 and scored 70 goals. His 60 goals for Bochum also signify a record for the club. His record of 16 successfully converted penalty goals is a Bundesliga record. Until his retirement, Abel played in Liechtenstein for FC Vaduz.

After his retirement from football he worked in the music business in logistics and managed FC Balzers, a Liechtenstein team which plays in the Swiss amateur leagues.

== Career statistics ==
Appearances and goals by club, season and competition
Club	Season	League			Cup		Continental		Total	
Club	Season	Division	Apps	Goals	Apps	Goals	Apps	Goals	Apps	Goals
Fortuna Düsseldorf	1972–73	Bundesliga	2	0	0	0	—		2	0
Fortuna Düsseldorf	1973–74	Bundesliga	4	1	1	1	1	0	6	2
Fortuna Düsseldorf	Total		6	1	1	1	1	0	8	2
Westfalia Herne	1974–75	Verbandsliga Westfalen	29	32	0	0	—		29	32
Westfalia Herne	1975–76	2. Bundesliga	33	17	2	1	—		35	18
Westfalia Herne	1976–77	2. Bundesliga	29	11	1	1	—		30	12
Westfalia Herne	1977–78	2. Bundesliga	11	3	3	4	—		14	7
Westfalia Herne	Total		102	63	6	6	0	0	108	69
VfL Bochum	1977–78	Bundesliga	20	15	1	0	—		21	15
VfL Bochum	1978–79	Bundesliga	28	11	4	4	—		32	15
VfL Bochum	1979–80	Bundesliga	34	13	3	3	—		37	16
VfL Bochum	1980–81	Bundesliga	33	11	4	3	—		37	14
VfL Bochum	1981–82	Bundesliga	29	10	6	3	—		35	13
VfL Bochum	Total		144	60	18	13	0	0	162	73
Schalke 04	1982–83	Bundesliga	33	9	4	2	—		37	11
Schalke 04	1983–84	2. Bundesliga	30	14	4	4	—		34	18
Schalke 04	Total		63	23	8	6	0	0	71	29
FC Vaduz	1984–85	1. Liga Classic					—			
FC Vaduz	1985–86	1. Liga Classic					—			
FC Vaduz	1986–87	1. Liga Classic					—			
FC Vaduz	Total						0	0		
FC Balzers	1987–88	2. Liga Interregional					—			
FC Balzers	1988–89	2. Liga Interregional					—			
FC Balzers	1989–90	2. Liga Interregional					—			
FC Balzers	1990–91	2. Liga Interregional					—			
FC Balzers	Total						0	0		
Career total							1	0		
