= Reinhard Mager =

German footballer

Personal information
- Date of birth: 2 May 1953 (age 73)
- Place of birth: Zimmern, West Germany
- Height: 1.88 m (6 ft 2 in)
- Position: Goalkeeper

Senior career*
Years	Team	Apps	(Gls)
–1975	BSV 07 Schwenningen		
1975–1984	VfL Bochum	114	(0)
1984–1989	Blau-Weiß 1890 Berlin	139	(0)
1989–1991	Hertha BSC	0	(0)
- * Club domestic league appearances and goals

Reinhard Mager (born 2 May 1953) is a German former professional footballer who played as a goalkeeper.
