= Dieter Bast =

German footballer (born 1951)

Personal information
- Date of birth: 28 August 1951 (age 75)
- Place of birth: Oberhausen, West Germany
- Height: 1.70 m (5 ft 7 in)
- Positions: Defender; midfielder; forward

Youth career
- –1970: SpVgg Sterkrade

Senior career*
Years	Team	Apps	(Gls)
1970–1977	Rot-Weiss Essen	213	(58)
1977–1983	VfL Bochum	192	(24)
1983–1986	Bayer Leverkusen	71	(2)
1986–1989	Rot-Weiss Essen	102	(2)
Total		578	(86)

International career
1973	West Germany U23	2	(0)
1976–1977	West Germany B	4	(0)
1982–1984	West Germany Olympic	14	(0)
- * Club domestic league appearances and goals

Dieter Bast (born 28 August 1951) is a German former professional footballer.

== Career ==
In total Bast played 412 Bundesliga games and scored 54 goals. His Bundesliga debut took place on his 19th birthday for Rot-Weiss Essen. He quickly established himself amongst the squad, however, in search of title-chasing football, he went to VfL Bochum where he played 192 games, and from 1983 until 1986, he played for Bayer Leverkusen. In 1986, he returned to Rot-Weiss Essen in the 2. Bundesliga where he played until his retirement in 1989.

Bast played in the Under-23 national team in 1973, and in the National second team between 1976–77. Even though he played Bundesliga football for fifteen steady years, he failed to win a trophy for any team in which he played.

== Career statistics ==
Appearances and goals by club, season and competition
Club	Season	League			DFB-Pokal		DFB-Ligapokal		Other		Total	
Club	Season	Division	Apps	Goals	Apps	Goals	Apps	Goals	Apps	Goals	Apps	Goals
Rot-Weiss Essen	1970–71	Bundesliga	22	3	0	0	—		—		22	3
Rot-Weiss Essen	1971–72	Regionalliga West	32	8	—		—		5 (Note: Appearances in Regionalliga promotion play-offs)	0	37	8
Rot-Weiss Essen	1972–73	Regionalliga West	32	22	2	1			8	3		
Rot-Weiss Essen	1973–74	Bundesliga	34	10	1	1	—		—		35	10
Rot-Weiss Essen	1974–75	Bundesliga	32	5	5	0	—		—		37	5
Rot-Weiss Essen	1975–76	Bundesliga	33	6	1	0	—		—		34	6
Rot-Weiss Essen	1976–77	Bundesliga	28	4	5	1	—		—		33	5
VfL Bochum	1977–78	Bundesliga	28	9	4	3	—		—		32	12
VfL Bochum	1978–79	Bundesliga	33	6	5	2	—		—		38	8
VfL Bochum	1979–80	Bundesliga	29	1	4	1	—		—		33	2
VfL Bochum	1980–81	Bundesliga	34	5	3	1	—		—		37	6
VfL Bochum	1981–82	Bundesliga	34	2	7	0	—		—		41	2
VfL Bochum	1982–83	Bundesliga	34	1	5	1	—		—		39	2
Bayer Leverkusen	1983–84	Bundesliga	33	1	1	0	—		—		34	1
Bayer Leverkusen	1984–85	Bundesliga	31	1	4	0	—		—		35	1
Bayer Leverkusen	1985–86	Bundesliga	7	0	3	0	—		—		10	0
Rot-Weiss Essen	1986–87	2. Bundesliga	33	1	—		—		—		33	1
Rot-Weiss Essen	1987–88	2. Bundesliga	37	1	1	0	—		—		38	1
Rot-Weiss Essen	1988–89	2. Bundesliga	32	0	3	0	—		—		35	0
Career total			578	86	54	11			13	3		
