= 1973–74 Eintracht Frankfurt season =

Eintracht Frankfurt
1973–74 season
- Chairman: Achaz von Thümen
- Manager: Dietrich Weise
- Bundesliga: 4th
- DFB-Pokal: Winner (Note: The cup final was held in the 1974-75 season because of the 1974 World Cup in Germany.)
- Top goalscorer: League: Bernd Hölzenbein (12); All: Bernd Hölzenbein (17)
- Highest home attendance: 62,000 16 March 1974 v Bayern Munich (league)
- Lowest home attendance: 8,000 4 May 1974 v Werder Bremen (league)
- Average home league attendance: 25,882
Home colours	Away colours

The 1973–74 Eintracht Frankfurt season was the 74th season in the club's football history. In 1973–74 the club played in the Bundesliga, the top tier of German football. It was the club's 11th season in the Bundesliga.

The season ended up with Eintracht winning the German cup for the first time.

== Matches ==
=== Legend ===
Win Draw Loss Postponed

=== Friendlies ===
21 July 1973	Friedrichsdorf XI (West Germany)	2–11	(West Germany) Eintracht Frankfurt	Friedrichsdorf, West Germany
		(Report)	Krauth; Grabowski; Kalb; Hölzenbein; Rohrbach; H Müller; Trinklein	Attendance: 1,000

22 July 1973	VfL Marburg (West Germany)	0–7	(West Germany) Eintracht Frankfurt
		(Report)	Goal	Attendance: 2,000

27 July 1973	FSV Frankfurt (West Germany)	1–0	(West Germany) Eintracht Frankfurt	Frankfurt, West Germany
	Stahl 73'	(Report)		Stadium: Stadion am Bornheimer Hang; Attendance: 6,000; Referee: Röder

29 July 1973	SV Darmstadt 98 (West Germany)	0–5	(West Germany) Eintracht Frankfurt	Darmstadt, West Germany
		(Report)	Rohrbach 7', 44'; Hölzenbein 14', 32'; Grabowski 38'	Stadium: Stadion am Böllenfalltor; Attendance: 5,000; Referee: Eichhorn

31 July 1973	SpVgg Bad Homburg (West Germany)	1–6	(West Germany) Eintracht Frankfurt	Bad Homburg, West Germany
	Diehl	(Report)	Grabowski 30' (pen.) 53'; Weidle 37'; Rohrbach 79'; Krauth 80'	Stadium: Sportplatz Sandelmühle; Attendance: 3,000; Referee: Klein

4 August 1973 Semi-Finals (Trofeo Ciudad de La Línea de la Concepción)	Real Betis (Spain)	0–0 (4–2 p)	(West Germany) Eintracht Frankfurt	La Línea de la Concepción, Spain
		(Report)		Stadium: Estadio Municipal; Attendance: 17,000; Referee: Martínez Banegas
	Penalties
			Grabowski (penalty scored); Weidle (penalty missed); Kliemann (penalty scored); Nickel (penalty missed)

5 August 1973 Third place play-off (Trofeo Ciudad de La Línea de la Concepción)	CD Málaga (Spain)	0–2	(West Germany) Eintracht Frankfurt	La Línea de la Concepción, Spain
		(Report)	Rohrbach 20'; Hölzenbein 79'	Stadium: Estadio Municipal; Attendance: 3,000; Referee: Soto Montesinos

7 August 1973	Cádiz CF (Spain)	0–2	(West Germany) Eintracht Frankfurt	Cádiz, Spain
		(Report)	Rohrbach 62'; Hölzenbein 85'	Attendance: 20,000

28 August 1973	SV Sandhausen (West Germany)	3–2	(West Germany) Eintracht Frankfurt
	Frey 42'; Engelhardt 67', 68'	(Report)	Parits 35'; Hölzenbein 52'	Attendance: 3,500; Referee: Webersdorfer

12 September 1973	SSV Dillenburg (West Germany)	0–7	(West Germany) Eintracht Frankfurt	Dillenburg, West Germany
		(Report)	Nickel 10'; Rohrbach; Parits; Kliemann	Attendance: 3,100; Referee: Nix

16 September 1973	Racing Strasbourg (France)	2–1	(West Germany) Eintracht Frankfurt	France
	Goal	(Report)	Nickel	Attendance: 2,000

18 September 1973	SpVgg Griesheim 02 (West Germany)	3–10	(West Germany) Eintracht Frankfurt
	Goal	(Report)	Kliemann; Kraus; Nickel; Grabowski; Rohrbach; Weidle	Attendance: 1,500

26 September 1973	Eintracht Frankfurt / Kickers Offenbach XI (West Germany)	5–2	(Italy) AC Milan	Frankfurt, West Germany
	Grabowski; Kliemann 8'; Semlitsch; Held	(Report)	Chiarugi; Tresoldi	Stadium: Waldstadion; Attendance: 15,000; Referee: Tschenscher

30 September 1973	FC Augsburg (West Germany)	0–5	(West Germany) Eintracht Frankfurt
		(Report)	Parits; Steinhäusler o.g.'; Weidle; Andree; Brandmair o.g.'	Attendance: 2,000

9 October 1973	FC Dossenheim (West Germany)	1–11	(West Germany) Eintracht Frankfurt	Dossenheim, West Germany
	Jakob	(Report)	Krauth; Nickel; H Müller; Kalb; Weidle; Uwe Kliemann; Körbel	Stadium: Jahnstadion; Attendance: 2,000

12 October 1973	Stuttgarter Kickers (West Germany)	2–2	(West Germany) Eintracht Frankfurt
	Scheuring 35'; Holock 69'	(Report)	Kliemann 72'; Trinklein 90'	Attendance: 2,000; Referee: Joos

21 November 1973	Freiburger FC (West Germany)	3–2	(West Germany) Eintracht Frankfurt	Freiburg, West Germany
	Westermann 30', 69'; Dries 49'	(Report)	Krauth 16'; Rohrbach 82'	Stadium: Möslestadion; Attendance: 2,500; Referee: Wiedemer

25 November 1973	Mainz 05 (West Germany)	2–8	(West Germany) Eintracht Frankfurt
	Scheller 11' (pen.), 85' (pen.)	(Report)	Krauth 4'; Hölzenbein 8'; Kalb 34' (pen.); Reichel 44'; Rohrbach 48', 90'; Trinklein 59'; Göttmann 67'	Attendance: 5,000; Referee: Nickel

12 December 1973	Eintracht Frankfurt (West Germany)	0–0	West Germany youth XI

30 December 1973	DJK Gütersloh (West Germany)	0–6	(West Germany) Eintracht Frankfurt
		(Report)	Parits 4', 48', 76'; Hölzenbein 63'; Kliemann 85'; Krauth 89'	Attendance: 4,500; Referee: Waltert

21 January 1974	Eintracht Frankfurt (combined XI) (West Germany)	4–3	(West Germany) Hesse XI
	Krauth 6'; Rainer Göttmann 45'; Rauch 76'; Kraus 78'	(Report)	Schwab 33', 36'; H Müller 58'	Referee: Guth

19 February 1974	TuS Neuendorf (West Germany)	2–5	(West Germany) Eintracht Frankfurt	Koblenz, West Germany
	Keil 36'; Rath 83' (pen.)	(Report)	Rohrbach 14'; Nickel 41'; Krauth 48'; Parits 70' (pen.)	Stadium: Stadion Oberwerth; Attendance: 1,700; Referee: Hontheim

23 February 1974	1. FC Saarbrücken (West Germany)	3–3	(West Germany) Eintracht Frankfurt
	Hähnchen 38'; Thelen 88', 90'	(Report)	Rohrbach 7'; Nickel 61'; Kalb 63'	Attendance: 3,500

2 April 1974	SV Wiesbaden (West Germany)	3–6	(West Germany) Eintracht Frankfurt
	Dymalla; Stengel; Freudenberg	(Report)	Kliemann; Parits; Hölzenbein; Rohrbach; Grabowski	Attendance: 3,500

28 April 1974	TSV Nördlingen (West Germany)	1–10	(West Germany) Eintracht Frankfurt
	Goal	(Report)	Krauth; Nickel; Weidle; Hölzenbein; Grabowski; Rohrbach

30 April 1974	BSV Weißenthurm (West Germany)	0–6	(West Germany) Eintracht Frankfurt
		(Report)	Goal	Attendance: 2,000

7 May 1974	TV Oberndorf (West Germany)	0–20	(West Germany) Eintracht Frankfurt
		(Report)	Kraus; Hölzenbein; Nickel; Rohrbach; Kliemann; Kalb; Körbel; Weidle; H Müller; o.g.'; o.g.'

22 May 1974 Semi-finals (Trofeo Ciudad de Zaragoza)	FK Partizan (Socialist Federal Republic of Yugoslavia)	0–0 (4–5 p)	(West Germany) Eintracht Frankfurt	Zaragoza, Spain
	Živaljević 24'; Bošković 40'	(Report)	Kalb 47' (pen.); Andree 70'	Attendance: 15,000

23 May 1974 Final match (Trofeo Ciudad de Zaragoza)	Real Zaragoza (Spain)	1–0 (a.e.t.)	(West Germany) Eintracht Frankfurt
	García Castany 95' (pen.)	(Report)		Attendance: 30,000

26 May 1974	Zamalek (Egypt)	2–5	(West Germany) Eintracht Frankfurt
	Goal	(Report)	Krauth; Kalb; Körbel; Rohrbach; Nickel	Attendance: 20,000

31 May 1974	Zamalek / Ismaily XI (Egypt)	1–0	(West Germany) Eintracht Frankfurt	Damanhur, Egypt
	Goal	(Report)		Attendance: 25,000

2 June 1974	Zamalek / El-Olympi XI (Egypt)	0–0	(West Germany) Eintracht Frankfurt	Cairo, Egypt
		(Report)		Stadium: Cairo International Stadium

=== Bundesliga ===
==== League fixtures and results ====
11 August 1973 1	1. FC Köln	1–1	Eintracht Frankfurt	Cologne, West Germany
15:30 CEST	Löhr 68' (pen.)	(Report)	Weber 71' (o.g.)	Stadium: Müngersdorfer Stadion; Attendance: 16,000

18 August 1973 2	Eintracht Frankfurt	3–0	MSV Duisburg	Frankfurt, West Germany
15:30 CEST	Grabowski 48'; Reichel 50'; Weidle 63'	(Report)		Stadium: Waldstadion; Attendance: 22,000; Referee: Biwersi

21 August 1973 3	1. FC Kaiserslautern	1–4	Eintracht Frankfurt	Kaiserslautern, West Germany
20:00	Sandberg 21'	(Report)	Weidle 48'; Grabowski 74'; Kalb 77' (pen.); Reichel 88'	Stadium: Betzenbergstadion; Attendance: 25,000; Referee: Eschweiler

25 August 1973 4	Eintracht Frankfurt	4–3	VfB Stuttgart	Frankfurt, West Germany
15:30 CEST	Nickel 68'; Weidle 76'; Hölzenbein 82', 84'	(Report)	Brenninger 59'; Entenmann 61'; Ettmayer 66'	Stadium: Waldstadion; Attendance: 35,000; Referee: Hennig

31 August 1973 5	VfL Bochum	1–1	Eintracht Frankfurt	Bochum, West Germany
20:00 CEST	Walitza 51'	(Report)	Körbel 76'	Stadium: Stadion an der Castroper Straße; Attendance: 28,000; Referee: Meuser

8 September 1973 6	Eintracht Frankfurt	1–0	Hamburger SV	Frankfurt, West Germany
15:30 CEST	Nickel 78'	(Report)		Stadium: Waldstadion; Attendance: 23,000; Referee: Bonacker

22 September 1973 8	Eintracht Frankfurt	1–0	Borussia Mönchengladbach	Frankfurt, West Germany
15:30 CEST	Rohrbach 47'	(Report)		Stadium: Waldstadion; Attendance: 52,000; Referee: Schulenburg

29 September 1973 9	Bayern Munich	2–2	Eintracht Frankfurt	Munich, West Germany
15:30 CEST	Dürnberger 31', 32'	(Report)	Nickel 34'; Hölzenbein 49'	Stadium: Olympiastadion; Attendance: 74,500; Referee: Dr Siepe

6 October 1973 10	Eintracht Frankfurt	4–2	Fortuna Köln	Frankfurt, West Germany
15:30 CEST	Hölzenbein 66'; Trinklein 73'; Nickel 77'; Kalb 87' (pen.)	(Report)	Kucharski 6', 62'	Stadium: Waldstadion; Attendance: 25,000; Referee: Gabor

16 October 1973 11	Rot-Weiss Essen	6–3	Eintracht Frankfurt	Frankfurt, West Germany
20:00 CEST	Fürhoff 16'; Lippens 31'; de Vlugt 45', 50'; Kunter 76' (o.g.); Weiss 78'	(Report)	Grabowski 19'; Senger 31' (o.g.); Bernd Hölzenbein 90'	Stadium: Waldstadion; Attendance: 21,000; Referee: Roth

20 October 1973 12	Eintracht Frankfurt	2–0	Hertha BSC	Frankfurt, West Germany
15:30 CEST	Nickel 42', 82'	(Report)		Stadium: Waldstadion; Attendance: 17,000; Referee: Hillebrand

23 October 1973 7	Kickers Offenbach	5–2	Eintracht Frankfurt	Offenbach, West Germany
20:00 CEST	Schäfer 9'; Semlitsch 38'; Ritschel 45' (pen.); Skala 46'; Kostedde 76'	(Report)	Andree 36'; Nickel 84'	Stadium: Bieberer Berg; Attendance: 31,500; Referee: Redelfs

27 October 1973 13	Wuppertaler SV	1–1	Eintracht Frankfurt	Wuppertal, West Germany
15:30 CEST	Cremer 37'	(Report)	Grabowski 8'	Stadium: Stadion am Zoo; Attendance: 19,000; Referee: Schäfer

3 November 1973 14	Eintracht Frankfurt	2–1	Schalke 04	Frankfurt, West Germany
15:30 CEST	Hölzenbein 54', 88'	(Report)	Kremers 58'	Stadium: Waldstadion; Attendance: 27,000; Referee: Biwersi

10 November 1973 15	Werder Bremen	1–2	Eintracht Frankfurt	Bremen, West Germany
15:30 CEST	Weist 50'	(Report)	Hölzenbein 9', 59'	Stadium: Weserstadion; Attendance: 19,000; Referee: Kindervater

3 November 1973 16	Eintracht Frankfurt	1–1	Hannover 96	Frankfurt, West Germany
20:00 CEST	Parits 25'	(Report)	Anders 20'	Stadium: Waldstadion; Attendance: 16,000; Referee: Dittmer

8 December 1973 17	Fortuna Düsseldorf	1–0	Eintracht Frankfurt	Düsseldorf, West Germany
15:30 CEST	Brei 33'	(Report)		Stadium: Rheinstadion; Attendance: 22,500; Referee: Meuser

5 January 1974 18	Eintracht Frankfurt	2–1	1. FC Köln	Frankfurt, West Germany
15:30 CEST	H Müller 32'; Grabowski 78'	(Report)	D Müller 30'	Stadium: Waldstadion; Attendance: 31,000; Referee: Ohmsen

12 January 1974 19	MSV Duisburg	1–1	Eintracht Frankfurt	Duisburg, West Germany
15:30 CEST	Bücker 90'	(Report)	Kliemann 32'	Stadium: Wedaustadion; Attendance: 30,000; Referee: Basedow

19 January 1974 20	Eintracht Frankfurt	3–1	1. FC Kaiserslautern	Frankfurt, West Germany
15:30 CEST	Kliemann 2'; Rohrbach 13', 63'	(Report)	Toppmöller 85'	Stadium: Waldstadion; Attendance: 28,000; Referee: Kindervater

26 January 1974 21	VfB Stuttgart	3–1	Eintracht Frankfurt	Stuttgart, West Germany
15:30 CEST	Ettmayer 38'; Coordes 40'; Ohlicher 75'	(Report)	Kliemann 90'	Stadium: Neckarstadion; Attendance: 50,000; Referee: Overberg

2 February 1974 22	Eintracht Frankfurt	3–1	VfL Bochum	Frankfurt, West Germany
15:30 CEST	Körbel 15'; Grabowski 58' (pen.); Kalb 64'	(Report)	Balte 60' (pen.)	Stadium: Waldstadion; Attendance: 15,000; Referee: Quindeau

9 February 1974 23	Hamburger SV	4–2	Eintracht Frankfurt	Hamburg, West Germany
15:30 CEST	Volkert 30', 60'; Heese 78'; Hönig 81'	(Report)	Rohrbach 40', 65'	Stadium: Volksparkstadion; Attendance: 35,000; Referee: Hillebrand

2 March 1974 24	Eintracht Frankfurt	2–2	Kickers Offenbach	Frankfurt, West Germany
15:30 CEST	Kliemann 16'; Grabowski 88' (pen.)	(Report)	Ritschel 53'; Hickersberger 86'	Stadium: Waldstadion; Attendance: 42,000; Referee: Hennig

9 March 1974 25	Borussia Mönchengladbach	0–0	Eintracht Frankfurt	Mönchengladbach, West Germany
15:30 CEST		(Report)		Stadium: Bökelbergstadion; Attendance: 32,000; Referee: Lutz

16 March 1974 26	Eintracht Frankfurt	1–1	Bayern Munich	Frankfurt, West Germany
15:30 CEST	Grabowski 18' (pen.)	(Report)	G Müller 79'	Stadium: Waldstadion; Attendance: 62,000; Referee: Weyland

23 March 1974 27	Fortuna Köln	3–2	Eintracht Frankfurt	Cologne, West Germany
15:30 CEST	Wesseler 35'; Otters 39'; Glock 83'	(Report)	Hölzenbein 54', 63'	Stadium: Müngersdorfer Stadion; Attendance: 9,000; Referee: Quindeau

30 March 1974 28	Eintracht Frankfurt	6–0	Rot-Weiss Essen	Frankfurt, West Germany
15:30 CEST	Nickel 8', 57'; Kalb 19', 58'; Rohrbach 64'; Parits 90'	(Report)		Stadium: Waldstadion; Attendance: 12,000; Referee: Picker

6 April 1974 29	Hertha BSC	2–1	Eintracht Frankfurt	Berlin, West Germany
15:30 CEST	Brück 40'; Grau 72'	(Report)	Trinklein 31'	Stadium: Olympiastadion; Attendance: 24,000; Referee: Eschweiler

20 April 1974 30	Eintracht Frankfurt	1–0	Wuppertaler SV	Frankfurt, West Germany
15:30 CEST	Nickel 36'	(Report)		Stadium: Waldstadion; Attendance: 12,000; Referee: Basedow

23 April 1974 31	Schalke 04	3–1	Eintracht Frankfurt	Gelsenkirchen, West Germany
20:00 CEST	Scheer 8'; Abramczik 88'; Sobieray 90'	(Report)	Hölzenbein 73'	Stadium: Parkstadion; Attendance: 70,000; Referee: Ohmsen

4 May 1974 32	Eintracht Frankfurt	1–1	Werder Bremen	Frankfurt, West Germany
15:30 CEST	Kliemann 58'	(Report)	Ohling 78'	Stadium: Waldstadion; Attendance: 8,000; Referee: Engel

11 May 1974 33	Hannover 96	0–0	Eintracht Frankfurt	Hanover, West Germany
15:30 CEST		(Report)		Stadium: Niedersachsenstadion; Attendance: 10,000; Referee: Weyland

18 May 1974 34	Eintracht Frankfurt	2–1	Fortuna Düsseldorf	Frankfurt, West Germany
15:30 CEST	Krauth 63'; Grabowski 66'	(Report)	Köhnen 29'	Stadium: Waldstadion; Attendance: 13,000; Referee: Nickel

==== League table ====
Pos	Team	Pld	W	D	L	GF	GA	GD	Pts	Qualification or relegation
2	Borussia Mönchengladbach	34	21	6	7	93	52	+41	48	Qualification to UEFA Cup first round
3	Fortuna Düsseldorf	34	16	9	9	61	47	+14	41	Qualification to UEFA Cup first round
4	Eintracht Frankfurt	34	15	11	8	63	50	+13	41	Qualification to Cup Winners' Cup first round
5	1. FC Köln	34	16	7	11	69	56	+13	39	Qualification to UEFA Cup first round
6	1. FC Kaiserslautern	34	15	8	11	80	69	+11	38	

Source: www.dfb.de
Rules for classification: 1) points; 2) goal difference; 3) number of goals scored.

=== DFB-Pokal ===
2 December 1973 1st Round	Tennis Borussia Berlin	1–8	Eintracht Frankfurt	Berlin, West Germany
	Hoffmann 60'	(Report)	Parits 19', 63'; Weidle 25', 42'; Grabowski 40', 84'; Rohrbach 68'; Krauth 85'	Stadium: Mommsenstadion; Attendance: 1,500; Referee: Eggers

15 December 1973 2nd Round	Hessen Kassel	2–3	Eintracht Frankfurt	Kassel, West Germany
	Martin 46', 86'	(Report)	Hölzenbein 43'; Parits 60', 91'	Stadium: Auestadion; Attendance: 18,000; Referee: Haselberger

16 February 1974 Quarter-finals	Eintracht Frankfurt	4–3 (a.e.t.)	1. FC Köln	Frankfurt, West Germany
	Hölzenbein 25', 93', 108'; Rohrbach 61'	(Report)	Overath 69', 99'; Flohe 73'	Stadium: Waldstadion; Attendance: 28,000; Referee: Horstmann

13 April 1974 Semi-finals	Eintracht Frankfurt	3–2	Bayern Munich	Frankfurt, West Germany
	Hölzenbein 49'; Rohrbach 68'; Kalb 90' (pen.)	(Report)	Hoeneß 60'; Breitner 62' (pen.)	Stadium: Waldstadion; Attendance: 62,000; Referee: Aldinger

== Squad ==
=== Squad and statistics ===
No.	Pos	Nat	Player	Total		Bundesliga		DFB-Pokal	
No.	Pos	Nat	Player	Apps	Goals	Apps	Goals	Apps	Goals
	GK	(West Germany) FRG	Peter Kunter	18	0	17	0	1	0
	GK	(West Germany) FRG	Günter Wienhold	20	0	17	0	3	0
	DF	(West Germany) FRG	Hans-Joachim Andree	18	1	17	1	1	0
	DF	(West Germany) FRG	Uwe Kliemann	38	5	34	5	4	0
	DF	(West Germany) FRG	Helmut Müller	19	1	16	1	3	0
	DF	(West Germany) FRG	Peter Reichel	36	2	32	2	4	0
	DF	(West Germany) FRG	Gert Trinklein	33	2	30	2	3	0
	MF	(West Germany) FRG	Bernd Hölzenbein	37	17	33	12	4	5
	MF	(West Germany) FRG	Jürgen Kalb	30	6	27	5	3	1
	MF	(West Germany) FRG	Charly Körbel	38	2	34	2	4	0
	MF	(West Germany) FRG	Wolfgang Kraus	29	0	28	0	1	0
	MF	(West Germany) FRG	Bernd Nickel	23	10	21	10	2	0
	FW	(West Germany) FRG	Jürgen Grabowski	36	11	32	9	4	2
	FW	(West Germany) FRG	Raimund Krauth	10	2	9	1	1	1
	FW	(Austria) AUT	Thomas Parits	20	6	17	2	3	4
	FW	(West Germany) FRG	Thomas Rohrbach	32	9	28	6	4	3
	FW	(West Germany) FRG	Roland Weidle	35	4	31	3	4	1

== Sources ==
- Matheja, Ulrich (2011). Unsere Eintracht - Eintracht Frankfurt - Die Chronik. Die Werkstatt. ISBN 978-3-89533-750-5.
