= 1974–75 Eintracht Frankfurt season =

Eintracht Frankfurt
1974-75 season
- Chairman: Achaz von Thümen
- Manager: Dietrich Weise
- Bundesliga: 3rd
- DFB-Pokal: Winner (73–74) (Note: The 1973-74 cup final was held in the 1974-75 season because of the 1974 World Cup in Germany.)
- DFB-Pokal: Winner (74–75)
- European Cup Winners' Cup: 2nd Round
- Top goalscorer: League: Bernd Hölzenbein (16); All: Bernd Hölzenbein (20)
- Highest home attendance: 58,400 5 April 1975 v Bayern Munich (league)
- Lowest home attendance: 9,000 30 November 1974 v Wuppertaler SV (league)
- Average home league attendance: 23,788
| Home colours | Away colours |

The 1974–75 Eintracht Frankfurt season was the 75th season in the club's football history. In 1974–75 the club played in the Bundesliga, the top tier of German football. It was the club's 12th season in the Bundesliga.

Within the season Eintracht won DFB Cup twice. The first time it was the 1973–74 campaign. That cup final was held in the beginning of season because of the 1974 World Cup in West Germany. The club repeated the cup victory and won the trophy at the end of the season. It was the first and second cup victory respectively.

== Matches ==
=== Legend ===
Win Draw Loss Postponed

=== Friendlies ===
| 20 July 1974 | 1. FC Oberursel (West Germany) | 0–7 | (West Germany) Eintracht Frankfurt | West Germany |
| | | (Report) | Nickel 2', 53'; Körbel 22' (pen.); Rohrbach 40'; Lorenz 51'; Weidle 65'; Kraus 89' | Attendance: 2,500; Referee: Boos |

| 21 July 1974 | FV Muggensturm (West Germany) | 1–8 | (West Germany) Eintracht Frankfurt | Muggensturm, West Germany |
| | Hornung 34' | (Report) | Körbel 14' (pen.); Nickel 30', 84'; Weidle 40'; Göttmann 52'; Rohrbach 69'; Lorenz 88'; Kraus 89' | Attendance: 1,800; Referee: Peter |

| 26 July 1974 | Viktoria Aschaffenburg (West Germany) | 1–5 | (West Germany) Eintracht Frankfurt |
| | Reichel 9' (o.g.) | (Report) | Kalb 11'; Beverungen 23'; Trumpp 46'; Lorenz 48'; Rohrbach 69' | Attendance: 1,300; Referee: Euler |

| 28 July 1974 | Eintracht Bad Kreuznach (West Germany) | 2–3 | (West Germany) Eintracht Frankfurt | Baumholder, West Germany |
| | Goal | (Report) | Nickel; Beverungen; Rohrbach |

| 30 July 1974 | Preußen Münster (West Germany) | 0–3 | (West Germany) Eintracht Frankfurt | West Germany |
| | | (Report) | Kraus 59'; Nickel 72'; Beverungen 75' | Attendance: 6,000 |

| 1 August 1974 | Borussia Fulda (West Germany) | 0–9 | (West Germany) Eintracht Frankfurt | West Germany |
| | | (Report) | Lorenz 9', 67'; Hölzenbein 20', 86', 89'; Grabowski 26', 39'; Rohrbach 50', 80' | Attendance: 3,500; Referee: Reinhardt |

| 4 August 1974 | SV Weil am Rhein (West Germany) | 0–10 | (West Germany) Eintracht Frankfurt | West Germany |
| | | (Report) | Grabowski; Weidle; Nickel; Rohrbach; Körbel; Hölzenbein |

| 6 August 1974 | Eintracht Frankfurt (West Germany) | 4–2 | (Spain) Granada CF | Frankfurt, West Germany |
| | Helmut Müller 21'; Lorenz 57'; Rohrbach 77', 81' | (Report) | Quiles 23', 86' | Stadium: Riederwaldstadion; Attendance: 6,000; Referee: Messmer |

| 9 August 1974 | Rot-Weiß Lüdenscheid (West Germany) | 0–1 | (West Germany) Eintracht Frankfurt | West Germany |
| | | (Report) | Beverungen 21' | Attendance: 3,000; Referee: Jecksties |

| 13 August 1974 | Rot-Weiss Frankfurt (West Germany) | 0–3 | (West Germany) Eintracht Frankfurt | Frankfurt, West Germany |
| | | (Report) | Hölzenbein 39'; Grabowski 80'; Rohrbach 86' | Stadium: Stadion am Brentanobad; Attendance: 3,500 |

| 27 August 1974 | FV Bad Vilbel (West Germany) | 2–5 | (West Germany) Eintracht Frankfurt | West Germany |
| | | (Report) | Kraus; Beverungen; Lorenz; Grabowski | Attendance: 3,000 |

| 24 September 1974 | SV Hofheim / FC Königstein XI (West Germany) | 1–14 | (West Germany) Eintracht Frankfurt | Königstein, West Germany |
| | Goal | (Report) | Grabowski; Lorenz; Rohrbach; Weidle; Nickel; Beverungen | Attendance: 2,500 |

| 13 October 1974 | VfL Klafeld-Geisweid (West Germany) | 0–9 | (West Germany) Eintracht Frankfurt | West Germany |
| | | (Report) | Kalb; Rohrbach; Hölzenbein; Lorenz; Beverungen; Kraus |

| 29 October 1974 | VfR 07 Limburg (West Germany) | 1–5 | (West Germany) Eintracht Frankfurt | West Germany |
| | Weiß 67' | (Report) | Körbel 5'; Nickel 36', 85'; Kraus 48'; Hölzenbein 74' | Attendance: 3,000; Referee: Ebel |

| 17 December 1974 | TuS Dotzheim (West Germany) | 1–15 | (West Germany) Eintracht Frankfurt | West Germany |
| | Goal | (Report) | Nickel; Grabowski; Hölzenbein; Lorenz; Rohrbach; Kraus | Attendance: 1,000 |

| 18 December 1974 | FC Dossenheim (West Germany) | 4–7 | (West Germany) Eintracht Frankfurt | West Germany |
| | Goal | (Report) | Grabowski; Lorenz; Kraus; Rohrbach; Stradt; Kalb | Attendance: 1,500 |

| 11 January 1975 | VfR Mannheim (West Germany) | 2–6 | (West Germany) Eintracht Frankfurt | West Germany |
| | Detterer 46'; Krstic 59' | (Report) | Nickel 7', 10'; Grabowski 11'; Lorenz 35'; Hölzenbein 50'; Neuberger 81' | Attendance: 3,500; Referee: Kahmann |

| 12 January 1975 | FSV Frankfurt (West Germany) | 0–2 | (West Germany) Eintracht Frankfurt | Frankfurt, West Germany |
| | | (Report) | Grabowski 57'; Kraus 62' | Stadium: Stadion am Bornheimer Hang; Attendance: 14,000; Referee: Dreher |

| 21 January 1975 | TuS Neuendorf / SF Eisbachtal | 1–3 | Eintracht Frankfurt | Koblenz, West Germany |
| | Komes 29' | (Report) | Nickel 51', 59'; Grabowski | Attendance: 6,000 |

| 9 March 1975 | VfR Groß-Gerau (West Germany) | 1–5 | (West Germany) Eintracht Frankfurt | Groß-Gerau, West Germany |
| | Bender 66' | (Report) | Neuberger 38'; Lorenz 54'; Kraus 59'; Rohrbach 70'; Weidle 90' | Attendance: 2,100; Referee: Feichtinger |

| 6 May 1975 | FV Biebrich 02 (West Germany) | 0–6 | (West Germany) Eintracht Frankfurt | West Germany |
| | | (Report) | Weidle; Kraus; Kalb; Rohrbach; Grabowski | Attendance: 1,500 |

| 17 May 1975 | RC Strasbourg (France) | 1–4 | (West Germany) Eintracht Frankfurt | Baden-Baden, West Germany |
| | Marcel 8' | (Report) | Körbel 30'; Grabowski 33', 62'; Lorenz 74' | Attendance: 2,500 |

| 27 May 1975 | FC Starkenburgia Heppenheim (West Germany) | 1–10 | (West Germany) Eintracht Frankfurt | Heppenheim, West Germany |
| | Hörner 81' | (Report) | Nickel 4', 5', 80'; Rohrbach 13', 68'; Trinklein 14'; Grabowski 15', 71'; Wienhold 16' (pen.); Beverungen 65' | Attendance: 3,000 |

| 3 June 1975 | Saarlouis XI (West Germany) | 1–8 | (West Germany) Eintracht Frankfurt | Saarlouis, West Germany |
| | Hector 52' | (Report) | Weidle 8', 12'; Nickel 23', 43', 49', 62', 81'; Beverungen 47' | Attendance: 3,000 |

| 12 June 1975 | SC Geislingen (West Germany) | 2–10 | (West Germany) Eintracht Frankfurt | West Germany |
| | Goal | (Report) | Grabowski; Kalb; Neuberger; Weidle; Beverungen; Nickel; Hölzenbein | Attendance: 3,000 |

=== Bundesliga ===
==== League fixtures and results ====
| 24 August 1974 1 | Werder Bremen | 0–3 | Eintracht Frankfurt | Bremen, West Germany |
| 15:30 CEST | | (Report) | Nickel 24'; Trinklein 42'; Rohrbach 89' | Stadium: Weserstadion; Attendance: 16,000; Referee: Eschweiler |

| 31 August 1974 2 | Eintracht Frankfurt | 1–1 | Borussia Mönchengladbach | Frankfurt, West Germany |
| 15:30 CEST | Hölzenbein 38' | (Report) | Wittkamp 76' | Stadium: Waldstadion; Attendance: 41,000; Referee: Horstmann |

| 11 September 1974 3 | Eintracht Frankfurt | 1–3 | Hamburger SV | Frankfurt, West Germany |
| 20:00 CEST | Grabowski 58' | (Report) | Bertl 17'; Reimann 37', 90' | Stadium: Waldstadion; Attendance: 30,000; Referee: Waltert |

| 14 September 1974 4 | Tennis Borussia Berlin | 1–4 | Eintracht Frankfurt | Berlin, West Germany |
| 15:30 CEST | Stolzenburg 14' | (Report) | Lorenz 19'; Weidle 26'; Rohrbach 47'; Beverungen 66' | Stadium: Poststadion; Attendance: 12,500; Referee: Hennig |

| 21 September 1974 5 | Eintracht Frankfurt | 5–1 | 1. FC Kaiserslautern | Frankfurt, West Germany |
| 15:30 CEST | Körbel 18' (pen.); Hölzenbein 73'; Lorenz 82', 89'; Nickel 83' | (Report) | Pirrung 62' | Stadium: Waldstadion; Attendance: 17,000; Referee: Kindervater |

| 28 September 1974 6 | MSV Duisburg | 1–3 | Eintracht Frankfurt | Duisburg, West Germany |
| 15:30 CEST | Seliger 51' | (Report) | Nickel 8'; Lorenz 86'; Reichel 88' | Stadium: Wedaustadion; Attendance: 15,000; Referee: Biwersi |

| 5 October 1974 7 | Eintracht Frankfurt | 9–1 | Rot-Weiss Essen | Frankfurt, West Germany |
| 15:30 CEST | Beverungen 2'; Nickel 15'; Hölzenbein 28', 31', 53'; Körbel 51' (pen.); Kraus 76'; Lorenz 88' | (Report) | Lippens 43' | Stadium: Waldstadion; Attendance: 13,000; Referee: Basedow |

| 9 October 1974 8 | VfL Bochum | 3–1 | Eintracht Frankfurt | Bochum, West Germany |
| 20:00 CEST | Holz 38'; Lameck 45' (pen.); Tenhagen 57' | (Report) | Rohrbach 81' | Stadium: Ruhrstadion; Attendance: 20,000; Referee: Ohmsen |

| 12 October 1974 9 | Eintracht Frankfurt | 4–0 | Fortuna Düsseldorf | Frankfurt, West Germany |
| 15:30 CEST | Körbel 10' (pen.); Beverungen 32'; Nickel 46'; Rohrbach 74' | (Report) | | Stadium: Waldstadion; Attendance: 22,000; Referee: Redelfs |

| 19 October 1974 10 | Bayern Munich | 2–1 | Eintracht Frankfurt | Munich, West Germany |
| 15:30 CEST | G Müller 60', 67' | (Report) | Hölzenbein 15' | Stadium: Olympiastadion; Attendance: 60,000; Referee: Weyland |

| 2 November 1974 11 | Eintracht Frankfurt | 0–0 | Kickers Offenbach | Frankfurt, West Germany |
| 15:30 CEST | | (Report) | | Stadium: Waldstadion; Attendance: 58,000; Referee: Tschenscher |

| 9 November 1974 12 | Hertha BSC | 2–1 | Eintracht Frankfurt | Berlin, West Germany |
| | Hermandung 12'; Kliemann 83' | (Report) | Grabowski 69' | Stadium: Olympiastadion; Attendance: 30,000; Referee: Hilker |

| 16 November 1974 13 | Eintracht Frankfurt | 5–5 | VfB Stuttgart | Frankfurt, West Germany |
| 15:30 CEST | Hölzenbein 17'; Weidle 24'; Körbel 30', 54'; Neuberger 82' | (Report) | Dietterle 8'; E Müller 20'; Ohlicher 49', 84'; Coordes 89' | Stadium: Waldstadion; Attendance: 15,000; Referee: Eschweiler |

| 23 November 1974 14 | 1. FC Köln | 0–0 | Eintracht Frankfurt | Cologne, West Germany |
| 15:30 CEST | | (Report) | | Stadium: Müngersdorfer Stadion; Attendance: 24,000; Referee: Roth |

| 30 November 1974 15 | Eintracht Frankfurt | 5–0 | Wuppertaler SV | Frankfurt, West Germany |
| 15:30 CEST | Weidle 18', 23' (pen.); Hölzenbein 42', 45' (pen.); Grabowski 78' | (Report) | | Stadium: Waldstadion; Attendance: 9,000; Referee: Engel |

| 10 December 19746 16 | FC Schalke 04 | 1–1 | Eintracht Frankfurt | Gelsenkirchen, West Germany |
| 20:00 CEST | Budde 16' | (Report) | Hölzenbein 74' | Stadium: Parkstadion; Attendance: 45,000; Referee: Schröder |

| 14 December 1974 17 | Eintracht Frankfurt | 2–0 | Eintracht Braunschweig | Frankfurt, West Germany |
| 15:30 CEST | Kraus 51'; Neuberger 71' | (Report) | | Stadium: Waldstadion; Attendance: 16,000; Referee: Hennig |

| 25 January 1975 18 | Eintracht Frankfurt | 2–1 | Werder Bremen | Frankfurt, West Germany |
| 15:30 CEST | Nickel 7'; Kraus 74' | (Report) | Ohling 22' | Stadium: Waldstadion; Attendance: 10,000; Referee: Kindervater |

| 1 February 1975 19 | Borussia Mönchengladbach | 3–0 | Eintracht Frankfurt | Mönchengladbach, West Germany |
| 15:30 CEST | Kulik 24'; Simonsen 33'; Heynckes 40' | (Report) | | Stadium: Bökelbergstadion; Attendance: 18,500; Referee: Biwersi |

| 15 February 1975 20 | Hamburger SV | 3–1 | Eintracht Frankfurt | Berlin, West Germany |
| 15:30 CEST | Nogly 45'; Reimann 58'; Sperlich 61' | (Report) | Nickel 65' | Stadium: Volksparkstadion; Attendance: 37,000; Referee: Eschweiler |

| 22 February 1975 21 | Eintracht Frankfurt | 7–1 | Tennis Borussia Berlin | Frankfurt, West Germany |
| 15:30 CEST | Nickel 25', 41'; Beverungen 37'; Körbel 57', 81' (pen.); Grabowski 66'; Kraus 78' | (Report) | Schulz 65' | Stadium: Waldstadion; Attendance: 12,000; Referee: Waltert |

| 1 March 1975 22 | 1. FC Kaiserslautern | 2–2 | Eintracht Frankfurt | Kaiserslautern, West Germany |
| 15:30 CEST | Toppmöller 12'; Sandberg 25' | (Report) | Nickel 28'; Kraus 39' | Stadium: Betzenbergstadion; Attendance: 30,000; Referee: Weyland |

| 7 March 1975 23 | Eintracht Frankfurt | 4–1 | MSV Duisburg | Frankfurt, West Germany |
| 20:00 CEST | Körbel 14' (pen.); Rohrbach 36'; Grabowski 39'; Hölzenbein 42' | (Report) | Thies 61' | Stadium: Waldstadion; Attendance: 14,000; Referee: Redelfs |

| 22 March 1975 24 | Rot-Weiss Essen | 0–5 | Eintracht Frankfurt | Essen, West Germany |
| 15:30 CEST | | (Report) | Beverungen 21', 74', 79'; Rohrbach 58'; Grabowski 89' | Stadium: Georg-Melches-Stadion; Attendance: 16,500; Referee: Roth |

| 1 April 1975 26 | Fortuna Düsseldorf | 2–2 | Eintracht Frankfurt | Düsseldorf, West Germany |
| 20:00 CEST | Seel 10'; Zewe 60' | (Report) | Kraus 18'; Grabowski 33' | Stadium: Rheinstadion; Attendance: 15,000; Referee: Ohmsen |

| 5 April 1975 27 | Eintracht Frankfurt | 2–0 | Bayern Munich | Frankfurt, West Germany |
| 15:30 CEST | Körbel 40' (pen.); Nickel 84' | (Report) | | Stadium: Waldstadion; Attendance: 58,400; Referee: Kindervater |

| 19 April 1975 28 | Kickers Offenbach | 2–1 | Eintracht Frankfurt | Offenbach, West Germany |
| 15:30 CEST | Janzon 65'; Ritschel 75' | (Report) | Grabowski 1' | Stadium: Bieberer Berg; Attendance: 32,000; Referee: Redelfs |

| 22 April 1975 25 | Eintracht Frankfurt | 4–1 | VfL Bochum | Frankfurt, West Germany |
| 20:00 CEST | Lorenz 12', 15', 82'; Hölzenbein 40' | (Report) | Dewinski 42' | Stadium: Waldstadion; Attendance: 12,000; Referee: Basedow |

| 3 May 1975 29 | Eintracht Frankfurt | 1–2 | Hertha BSC | Frankfurt, West Germany |
| | Hölzenbein 35' | (Report) | Kliemann 55'; Grau 79' | Stadium: Waldstadion; Attendance: 27,000; Referee: Waltert |

| 10 May 1975 30 | VfB Stuttgart | 3–4 | Eintracht Frankfurt | Stuttgart, West Germany |
| 15:30 CEST | Ohlicher 28', 55'; Coordes 61' | (Report) | Grabowski 37', 90'; Lorenz 47'; Hölzenbein 65' | Stadium: Neckarstadion; Attendance: 23,000; Referee: Eschweiler |

| 23 May 1975 31 | Eintracht Frankfurt | 3–2 | 1. FC Köln | Frankfurt, West Germany |
| 20:00 CEST | Hölzenbein 12', 28'; Beverungen 24' | (Report) | Neumann 6', 74' | Stadium: Waldstadion; Attendance: 32,000; Referee: Biwersi |

| 31 May 1975 32 | Wuppertaler SV | 2–3 | Eintracht Frankfurt | Wuppertal, West Germany |
| 15:30 CEST | Jung 58'; Lausen 77' | (Report) | Lorenz 5'; Grabowski 30', 37' | Stadium: Stadion am Zoo; Attendance: 4,000; Referee: Roth |

| 7 June 1975 33 | Eintracht Frankfurt | 2–1 | FC Schalke 04 | Frankfurt, West Germany |
| 15:30 CEST | Beverungen 54'; Grabowski 69' | (Report) | Fischer 20' | Stadium: Waldstadion; Attendance: 18,000; Referee: Gabor |

| 14 June 1975 34 | Eintracht Braunschweig | 2–0 | Eintracht Frankfurt | Braunschweig, West Germany |
| 15:30 CEST | Bründl 58' (pen.); Hollmann 67' | (Report) | | Stadium: Sportplatz an der Helmstedter Straße; Attendance: 10,000; Referee: Weyland |

==== League table ====
| Pos | Team | Pld | W | D | L | GF | GA | GD | Pts | Qualification or relegation |
|---|---|---|---|---|---|---|---|---|---|---|
| 1 | Borussia Mönchengladbach (C) | 34 | 21 | 8 | 5 | 86 | 40 | +46 | 50 | Qualification to European Cup first round |
| 2 | Hertha BSC | 34 | 19 | 6 | 9 | 61 | 43 | +18 | 44 | Qualification to UEFA Cup first round |
| 3 | Eintracht Frankfurt | 34 | 18 | 7 | 9 | 89 | 49 | +40 | 43 | Qualification to Cup Winners' Cup first round |
| 4 | Hamburger SV | 34 | 18 | 7 | 9 | 55 | 38 | +17 | 43 | Qualification to UEFA Cup first round |
| 5 | 1. FC Köln | 34 | 17 | 7 | 10 | 77 | 51 | +26 | 41 | Qualification to UEFA Cup first round |

Source: www.dfb.de
Rules for classification: 1) points; 2) goal difference; 3) number of goals scored.
(C) Champions

=== DFB-Pokal ===
==== 1973–74 ====
===== Final =====
17 August 1974
16:00 CET

| Hamburger SV | 1–3 (a.e.t.) | Eintracht Frankfurt |
|---|---|---|
| Bjørnmose 75' | Report | Trinklein 40'; Hölzenbein 95'; Kraus 115' |

Rheinstadion, Düsseldorf
Attendance: 52,800
Referee: Hans-Joachim Weyland (Oberhausen)

==== 1974–75 ====
| 7 September 1974 1st Round | Arminia Bielefeld | 1–3 | Eintracht Frankfurt | Bielefeld, West Germany |
| | Graul 12' | (Report) | Nickel 5'; Kraus 45', 50' | Stadium: Bielefelder Alm; Attendance: 27,000; Referee: Biwersi |

| 27 October 1974 2nd Round | Union Solingen | 1–2 (a.e.t.) | Eintracht Frankfurt | Solingen, West Germany |
| | Lehr 8' | (Report) | Beverungen 75'; Rohrbach 115' | Stadium: Stadion am Hermann-Löns-Weg; Attendance: 12,000; Referee: Lutz |

| 8 February 1975 3rd Round | 1. FC Mülheim | 0–3 | Eintracht Frankfurt | Mülheim, West Germany |
| | | (Report) | Luttrop 74' (o.g.); Beverungen 80'; Grabowski 82' | Stadium: Ruhrstadion; Attendance: 10,000; Referee: Picker |

| 15 March 1975 4th Round | Eintracht Frankfurt | 1–0 | VfL Bochum | Frankfurt, West Germany |
| | Weidle 40' | (Report) | | Stadium: Waldstadion; Attendance: 15,000; Referee: Quindeau |

| 12 April 1975 Quarter-finals | Eintracht Frankfurt | 4–2 | Fortuna Köln | Frankfurt, West Germany |
| | Grabowski 17', 30'; Lorenz 53'; Hölzenbein 81' | (Report) | Hattenberger 25'; Linßen 29' | Stadium: Waldstadion; Attendance: 9,000; Referee: Engel |

| 13 April 1974 Semi-finals | Eintracht Frankfurt | 3–1 (a.e.t.) | Rot-Weiss Essen | Frankfurt, West Germany |
| | Beverungen 69', 111'; Lorenz 116' | (Report) | Burgsmüller 85' | Stadium: Waldstadion; Attendance: 22,000; Referee: Schröder |

===== Final =====
21 June 1975
16:00 CET

| Eintracht Frankfurt | 1–0 | MSV Duisburg |
|---|---|---|
| Körbel 57' | Report |

Niedersachsenstadion, Hanover
Attendance: 43,000
Referee: Walter Horstmann (Nordstemmen)

=== European Cup Winners' Cup ===
| 17 September 1974 1st Round | Eintracht Frankfurt (West Germany) | 3–0 | (France) AS Monaco | Frankfurt, West Germany |
| | Hölzenbein 8', 57'; Rohrbach 26' | (Report) | | Stadium: Waldstadion; Attendance: 19,000; Referee: Petri |

| 2 October 1974 1st Round | AS Monaco (France) | 2–2 | (West Germany) Eintracht Frankfurt | Fontvieille, Monaco |
| | Onnis 49'; Petit 51' | (Report) | Beverungen 4'; Nickel 7' | Stadium: Stade Louis II; Attendance: 6,000; Referee: Martínez |

| 23 October 1974 2nd Round | Eintracht Frankfurt (West Germany) | 2–3 | (Soviet Union) Dynamo Kyiv | Frankfurt, West Germany |
| | Nickel 2'; Körbel 64' (pen.) | (Report) | Onyshchenko 32'; Blokhin 82'; Muntyan 87' | Stadium: Waldstadion; Attendance: 22,000; Referee: Da Luz Diaz Correia |

| 5 November 1974 2nd Round | Dynamo Kyiv (Soviet Union) | 2–1 | (West Germany) Eintracht Frankfurt | Kyiv, Soviet Union |
| | Onyshchenko 1', 39' | (Report) | Rohrbach 47' | Attendance: 60,000; Referee: Hirviniemi |

== Squad ==
=== Squad and statistics ===
| No. | Pos | Nat | Player | Total | | Bundesliga | | DFB-Pokal | | European Cup Winners' Cup | |
| No. | Pos | Nat | Player | Apps | Goals | Apps | Goals | Apps | Goals | Apps | Goals |
|---|---|---|---|---|---|---|---|---|---|---|---|
| | GK | (West Germany) FRG | Peter Kunter | 17 | 0 | 13 | 0 | 2 | 0 | 2 | 0 |
| | GK | (West Germany) FRG | Günter Wienhold | 29 | 0 | 21 | 0 | 6 | 0 | 2 | 0 |
| | DF | (West Germany) FRG | Hans-Joachim Andree | 2 | 0 | 1 | 0 | 1 | 0 | 0 | 0 |
| | DF | (West Germany) FRG | Jürgen Kalb | 23 | 0 | 15 | 0 | 6 | 0 | 2 | 0 |
| | DF | (West Germany) FRG | Charly Körbel | 43 | 12 | 31 | 10 | 8 | 1 | 4 | 1 |
| | DF | (West Germany) FRG | Helmut Müller | 18 | 0 | 13 | 0 | 2 | 0 | 3 | 0 |
| | DF | (West Germany) FRG | Willi Neuberger | 27 | 2 | 22 | 2 | 5 | 0 | 0 | 0 |
| | DF | (West Germany) FRG | Peter Reichel | 37 | 1 | 29 | 1 | 6 | 0 | 2 | 0 |
| | DF | (West Germany) FRG | Gerd Simons | 1 | 0 | 0 | 0 | 0 | 0 | 1 | 0 |
| | DF | (West Germany) FRG | Gert Trinklein | 40 | 2 | 31 | 1 | 5 | 1 | 4 | 0 |
| | MF | (West Germany) FRG | Klaus Beverungen | 42 | 14 | 30 | 9 | 8 | 4 | 4 | 1 |
| | MF | (West Germany) FRG | Jürgen Grabowski | 45 | 16 | 33 | 13 | 8 | 3 | 4 | 0 |
| | MF | (West Germany) FRG | Wolfgang Kraus | 36 | 9 | 27 | 6 | 6 | 3 | 3 | 0 |
| | MF | (West Germany) FRG | Bernd Nickel | 46 | 14 | 34 | 11 | 8 | 1 | 4 | 2 |
| | MF | (West Germany) FRG | Roland Weidle | 39 | 5 | 28 | 4 | 8 | 1 | 3 | 0 |
| | FW | (West Germany) FRG | Bernd Hölzenbein | 43 | 20 | 33 | 16 | 7 | 2 | 3 | 2 |
| | FW | (West Germany) FRG | Bernd Lorenz | 22 | 12 | 16 | 10 | 5 | 2 | 1 | 0 |
| | FW | (West Germany) FRG | Thomas Rohrbach | 35 | 8 | 26 | 6 | 5 | 1 | 4 | 1 |
| | FW | (West Germany) FRG | Wilfried Stradt | 2 | 0 | 2 | 0 | 0 | 0 | 0 | 0 |

== Sources ==
- Matheja, Ulrich (2011). Unsere Eintracht - Eintracht Frankfurt - Die Chronik. Die Werkstatt. ISBN 978-3-89533-750-5.
