= 1976–77 Eintracht Frankfurt season =

Eintracht Frankfurt
1976–77 season
- Chairman: Achaz von Thümen
- Manager: Hans-Dieter Roos (sacked 8 November 1976); Gyula Lóránt (signed 9 November 1976)
- Bundesliga: 4th
- DFB-Pokal: Quarter-finals
- Top goalscorer: League: Bernd Hölzenbein (26); All: Bernd Hölzenbein (28)
- Highest home attendance: 60,000 14 May 1977 v Bayern Munich (league)
- Lowest home attendance: 8,000 27 November 1976 v Rot-Weiss Essen (league)
- Average home league attendance: 24,000
Home colours

The 1976–77 Eintracht Frankfurt season was the 77th season in the club's football history. In 1976–77 the club played in the Bundesliga, the top tier of German football. It was the club's 14th season in the Bundesliga.

== Matches ==
=== Legend ===
Win Draw Loss Postponed

=== Friendlies ===
16 July 1976	Ortenau XI (West Germany)	0–5	(West Germany) Eintracht Frankfurt	Offenburg, West Germany
		Report	Hölzenbein; Wenzel	Attendance: 2,500

18 July 1976	SpVgg Freudenstadt (West Germany)	0–13	(West Germany) Eintracht Frankfurt	West Germany
		Report	Beverungen; Hölzenbein 24' (pen.), 48' (pen.), 63' (pen.), 72'; Nickel 50', 89'; Bihn 53', 65', 66'; Neuberger 60', 78'; Grabowski 85'	Attendance: 3,000; Referee: Blass

22 July 1976	TV Gültstein (West Germany)	1–9	(West Germany) Eintracht Frankfurt	West Germany
	Riem 46'	Report	Bihn 16', 39', 44'; Neuberger 21'; Beverungen 25'; Grabowski 29'; Wenzel 58'; Nickel 74'; Stradt 80'	Attendance: 3,000

24 July 1976	AS Saint-Étienne (France)	0–0	(West Germany) Eintracht Frankfurt	Saint-Étienne, France
		Report		Attendance: 10,000; Referee: Martin

28 July 1976	Eintracht Frankfurt (West Germany)	4–1	(England) Tottenham Hotspur	Frankfurt, West Germany
20:00 CEST	Grabowski 18' (pen.), 67'; Nickel 63'; Neuberger 74'	Report	Young 82'	Stadium: Waldstadion; Attendance: 7,000; Referee: Aldinger

31 July 1976	FK Pirmasens (West Germany)	2–6	(West Germany) Eintracht Frankfurt	Pirmasens, West Germany
	Schuster 11'; Scherer 72'	Report	Nickel 36', 68'; Wenzel 38', 72'; Grabowski 45' (pen.); Bihn 76'	Attendance: 3,500; Referee: Treib

1 August 1976	Eintracht Bad Kreuznach (West Germany)	0–4	(West Germany) Eintracht Frankfurt	Bad Kreuznach, West Germany
		Report	Beverungen 15'; Bihn 17'; Nickel; Hölzenbein	Stadium: Friedrich-Moebus-Stadion; Attendance: 800

3 August 1976	Rot-Weiss Frankfurt (West Germany)	0–3	(West Germany) Eintracht Frankfurt	Frankfurt, West Germany
		Report	Bihn 9'; Borchers 70'; Nickel 88'	Stadium: Stadion am Brentanobad; Attendance: 2,500; Referee: Engel

10 August 1976	Dillkreis XI (West Germany)	3–6	(West Germany) Eintracht Frankfurt	Dillenburg, West Germany
	Franz 8'; Enners 26'; Laskowski 87'	Report	Grabowski 3'; Weidle 6', 65', 83'; 37'; Beverungen 46'	Attendance: 2,000; Referee: Schmidt

15 August 1976	SG 01 Hoechst (West Germany)	1–8	(West Germany) Eintracht Frankfurt	West Germany
	Malura	Report	Grabowski; Nickel; Hölzenbein; Kraus	Stadium: Stadion am Stadtpark; Attendance: 2,000

24 August 1976 Joan Gamper Trophy semi-final	CSKA Moscow (Soviet Union)	3–5	(West Germany) Eintracht Frankfurt	Barcelona, Spain
	Kolpovski 64'; Chesnokov 71'; Müller 73' (o.g.)	Report	Shalnev 14' (o.g.); Bihn 24'; Müller 37'; Wenzel 54'; Körbel 68'	Stadium: Camp Nou; Attendance: 60,000; Referee: Melero Guaza

25 August 1976 Joan Gamper Trophy final	FC Barcelona (Spain)	2–0	(West Germany) Eintracht Frankfurt	Barcelona, Spain
	Neeskens 41'; Clares 43'	Report		Stadium: Camp Nou; Attendance: 90,000; Referee: Sanchez Rios

31 August 1976	SV Korbach (West Germany)	0–6	(West Germany) Eintracht Frankfurt	West Germany
		Report	Wenzel 37', 77'; Nickel 40', 82'; Grabowski 47', 90'	Attendance: 2,500; Referee: Hellwig

7 September 1976	FV 08 Hockenheim (West Germany)	1–7	(West Germany) Eintracht Frankfurt	Hockenheim, West Germany
	Herzog 70'	Report	Nickel; Kraus; Reichel; Hölzenbein; Trinklein; Andres	Attendance: 1,500

14 September 1976	VfR Bürstadt (West Germany)	4–0	(West Germany) Eintracht Frankfurt	Bürstadt, West Germany
	Geier 15' (pen.); Bihn 17' (o.g.); Jordan 25', 54'	Report		Attendance: 2,000

17 October 1976	Kickers Offenbach (West Germany)	1–3	(West Germany) Eintracht Frankfurt	Offenbach, West Germany
	Bastrup 56'	Report	Weidle 17', 42'; Wenzel 22'	Stadium: Stadion am Bieberer Berg; Attendance: 5,000; Referee: Dreher

16 November 1976	Eintracht Frankfurt (West Germany)	4–0	(West Germany) Viktoria Aschaffenburg	Frankfurt, West Germany
	Körbel; Wenzel (pen.); Nickel	Report		Stadium: Riederwaldstadion; Attendance: 1,000
Note: 3x30 minutes

22 November 1976	Aston Villa (England)	3–1	(West Germany) Eintracht Frankfurt	Birmingham, England
	Deehan 51'; Little 52', 56'	Report	Wenzel 15'	Stadium: Villa Park; Attendance: 26,615

2 January 1977	FSV Frankfurt (West Germany)	2–3	(West Germany) Eintracht Frankfurt	Frankfurt, West Germany
14:30 CEST	Genz 47'; Hofmann 81'	Report	Stepanović 1'; Kraus 41'; Bihn 77'	Stadium: Stadion am Bornheimer Hang; Attendance: 5,000; Referee: Henfling

14 January 1977	Eintracht Frankfurt (West Germany)	6–1	(West Germany) VfR Groß-Gerau	Frankfurt, West Germany
	Weidle; Hölzenbein; Nickel; Wenzel; Krobbach; Schmenger (o.g.)		Bender	Stadium: Riederwaldstadion; Attendance: 800; Referee: Tippenhauer
Note: 3x30 minutes

22 January 1977	KSV Baunatal (West Germany)	0–2	(West Germany) Eintracht Frankfurt	Baunatal, West Germany
		Report	Grabowski 37'; Grawunder 84' (o.g.)	Attendance: 2,000; Referee: Grütter

29 April 1977	Würzburger FV (West Germany)	1–5	(West Germany) Eintracht Frankfurt	Würzburg, West Germany
	Hiestermann 63'	Report	Beverungen 11', 41'; Grabowski 40' (pen.); Nickel 75'; Wenzel 81'	Attendance: 1,877; Referee: Drescher

3 May 1977	Eintracht Frankfurt (West Germany)	6–1	(Socialist Federal Republic of Yugoslavia) Red Star Belgrade	Frankfurt, West Germany
20:00 CEST	Hölzenbein 25', 31'; Wenzel 28', 87'; Grabowski 57'; Beverungen 72'	Report	Sušić 81'	Stadium: Waldstadion; Attendance: 8,000; Referee: Aldinger

10 May 1977	Union Niederrad (West Germany)	0–10	(West Germany) Eintracht Frankfurt	Frankfurt, West Germany
		Report	Hölzenbein 24', 30', 42', 48', 67', 87'; Grabowski 26', 56'; Beverungen 77'; Stepanović 78'	Attendance: 2,200; Referee: Engel

=== Bundesliga ===
==== League fixtures and results ====
14 August 1976 1	Eintracht Braunschweig	3–1	Eintracht Frankfurt	Braunschweig, West Germany
15:30 CEST	Frank 17', 82'; Neuberger 90' (o.g.)	Report	Bihn 42'	Stadium: Eintracht-Stadion; Attendance: 20,000; Referee: Kindervater

21 August 1976 2	Eintracht Frankfurt	7–1	Tennis Borussia Berlin	Frankfurt, West Germany
15:30 CEST	Hölzenbein 14', 53' (pen.), 71'; Nickel 31'; Kraus 37', 79'; Grabowski 54'	Report	Berkemeier 61'	Stadium: Waldstadion; Attendance: 12,000; Referee: Eschweiler

28 August 1976 3	1. FC Köln	2–0	Eintracht Frankfurt	Cologne, West Germany
15:30 CEST	Van Gool 10'; Kösling 86'	Report		Stadium: Müngersdorfer Stadion; Attendance: 50,000; Referee: Linn

3 September 1976 4	Eintracht Frankfurt	6–3	FC Schalke 04	Frankfurt, West Germany
20:00 CEST	Kraus 48'; Nickel 59'; Grabowski 74', 87'; Hölzenbein 75', 89'	Report	Abramczik 28'; Kremers 29'; Lütkebohmert 82'	Stadium: Waldstadion; Attendance: 27,000; Referee: Horstmann

11 September 1976 5	Hamburger SV	3–1	Eintracht Frankfurt	Hamburg, West Germany
15:30 CEST	Steffenhagen 53'; Volkert 63' (pen.); Reimann 82'	Report	Wenzel 87'	Stadium: Volksparkstadion; Attendance: 44,000; Referee: Waltert

18 September 1976 6	Eintracht Frankfurt	2–1	1. FC Saarbrücken	Frankfurt, West Germany
15:30 CEST	Körbel 9'; Beverungen 45'	Report	Traser 41' (pen.)	Stadium: Waldstadion; Attendance: 15,000; Referee: Hilker

25 September 1976 7	Karlsruher SC	2–0	Eintracht Frankfurt	Karlsruhe, West Germany
15:30 CEST	Trenkel 43'; Janzon 87'	Report		Stadium: Wildparkstadion; Attendance: 25,000; Referee: Antz

2 October 1976 8	Eintracht Frankfurt	1–3	Borussia Mönchengladbach	Frankfurt, West Germany
15:30 CEST	Weidle 20'	Report	Simonsen 35', 52'; Wittkamp 40'	Stadium: Waldstadion; Attendance: 45,000; Referee: Ohmsen

9 October 1976 9	MSV Duisburg	4–3	Eintracht Frankfurt	Duisburg, West Germany
15:30 CEST	Jara 29', 88'; Büssers 34'; Worm 80'	Report	Wenzel 17'; Bihn 47'; Nickel 68' (pen.)	Stadium: Wedaustadion; Attendance: 21,000; Referee: Schröder

23 October 1976 10	Eintracht Frankfurt	3–3	Hertha BSC	Frankfurt, West Germany
15:30 CEST	Nickel 40' (pen.), 73'; Wenzel 63'	Report	Kristensen 7', 90'; Hermandung 17'	Stadium: Waldstadion; Attendance: 16,000; Referee: Quindeau

30 October 1976 11	VfL Bochum	3–1	Eintracht Frankfurt	Bochum, West Germany
15:30 CEST	Tenhagen 9'; Eggert 73'; Köper 79'	Report	Nickel 78'	Stadium: Ruhrstadion; Attendance: 13,000; Referee: Gabor

6 November 1976 12	Eintracht Frankfurt	1–4	Borussia Dortmund	Frankfurt, West Germany
15:30 CEST	Wenzel 6'	Report	Burgsmüller 42', 69'; Kostedde 53'; Huber 87'	Stadium: Waldstadion; Attendance: 23,000; Referee: Redelfs

13 November 1976 13	Werder Bremen	2–1	Eintracht Frankfurt	Bremen, West Germany
15:30 CEST	Weist 4'; Bracht 49'	Report	Hölzenbein 20'	Stadium: Weser-Stadion; Attendance: 16,000; Referee: Engel

20 November 1976 14	Eintracht Frankfurt	2–0	1. FC Kaiserslautern	Frankfurt, West Germany
15:30 CEST	Hölzenbein 19', 54'	Report		Stadium: Waldstadion; Attendance: 18,000; Referee: Eschweiler

27 November 1976 15	Eintracht Frankfurt	3–1	Rot-Weiss Essen	Frankfurt, West Germany
15:30 CEST	Hölzenbein 11', 18'; Müller 88'	Report	Mill 90'	Stadium: Waldstadion; Attendance: 8,000; Referee: Roth

4 December 1976 16	Bayern Munich	0–3	Eintracht Frankfurt	Munich, West Germany
15:30 CEST		Report	Nickel 30'; Hölzenbein 74' (pen.), 77'	Stadium: Olympiastadion; Attendance: 25,000; Referee: Horstmann

11 December 1976 17	Eintracht Frankfurt	1–1	Fortuna Düsseldorf	Frankfurt, West Germany
15:30 CEST	Kraus 30'	Report	Seel 27'	Stadium: Waldstadion; Attendance: 12,000; Referee: Biwersi

29 January 1977 20	Eintracht Frankfurt	4–0	1. FC Köln	Frankfurt, West Germany
15:30 CEST	Wenzel 40', 68', 69', 76'	Report		Stadium: Waldstadion; Attendance: 24,000; Referee: Jensen

5 February 1977 21	FC Schalke 04	1–1	Eintracht Frankfurt	Gelsenkirchen, West Germany
15:30 CEST	Rüssmann 50'	Report	Kremers 30' (o.g.)	Stadium: Parkstadion; Attendance: 25,000; Referee: Engel

12 February 1977 22	Eintracht Frankfurt	2–1	Hamburger SV	Frankfurt, West Germany
15:30 CEST	Hölzenbein 55'; Wenzel 66'	Report	Volkert 26'	Stadium: Waldstadion; Attendance: 29,000; Referee: Antz

26 February 1977 23	1. FC Saarbrücken	2–2	Eintracht Frankfurt	Saarbrücken, West Germany
15:30 CEST	Ellbracht 80'; Stegmayer 85'	Report	Grabowski 31'; Stepanović 45'	Stadium: Ludwigsparkstadion; Attendance: 24,000; Referee: Hennig

1 March 1977 18	Eintracht Frankfurt	3–0	Eintracht Braunschweig	Frankfurt, West Germany
20:00 CEST	Hölzenbein 12'; Wenzel 15', 61'	Report	Handschuh (red card) 77'	Stadium: Waldstadion; Attendance: 35,000; Referee: Ahlenfelder

5 March 1977 24	Eintracht Frankfurt	3–2	Karlsruher SC	Frankfurt, West Germany
15:30 CEST	Hölzenbein 37', 56' (pen.); Nickel 68'	Report	Struth 39' (pen.); Janzon 73'	Stadium: Waldstadion; Attendance: 19,000; Referee: Wichmann

12 March 1977 25	Borussia Mönchengladbach	1–3	Eintracht Frankfurt	Mönchengladbach, West Germany
15:30 CEST	Hannes 90'	Report	Wenzel 25'; Stepanović 60'; Nickel 89' (pen.)	Stadium: Bökelbergstadion; Attendance: 23,000; Referee: Linn

15 March 1977 19	Tennis Borussia Berlin	1–1	Eintracht Frankfurt	Berlin, West Germany
20:00 CEST	Wendt 59' (pen.)	Report	Wenzel 62'	Stadium: Olympiastadion; Attendance: 8,000; Referee: Meuser

19 March 1977 26	Eintracht Frankfurt	3–1	MSV Duisburg	Frankfurt, West Germany
15:30 CEST	Hölzenbein 8', 87'; Wenzel 89'	Report	Worm 10'	Stadium: Waldstadion; Attendance: 25,000; Referee: Lutz

26 March 1977 27	Hertha BSC	2–3	Eintracht Frankfurt	Berlin, West Germany
15:30 CEST	Granitza 3'; Kliemann 26'	Report	Kraus 58', 77'; Hölzenbein 87'	Stadium: Olympiastadion; Attendance: 17,000; Referee: Jensen

2 April 1977 28	Eintracht Frankfurt	2–2	VfL Bochum	Frankfurt, West Germany
15:30 CEST	Nickel 15'; Kraus 44'	Report	Tenhagen 42'; Lameck 69' (pen.)	Stadium: Waldstadion; Attendance: 21,000; Referee: Redelfs

12 April 1977 29	Borussia Dortmund	2–2	Eintracht Frankfurt	Dortmund, West Germany
20:00 CEST	Kostedde 5'; Segler 90'	Report	Wenzel 28'; Hölzenbein 49'	Stadium: Westfalenstadion; Attendance: 49,000; Referee: Gabor

16 April 1977 30	Eintracht Frankfurt	7–1	Werder Bremen	Frankfurt, West Germany
15:30 CEST	Kraus 5', 52'; Wenzel 13', 89'; Trinklein 61'; Reichel 65'; Hölzenbein 76'	Report	Meininger 42'	Stadium: Waldstadion; Attendance: 19,000; Referee: Kindervater

22 April 1977 31	1. FC Kaiserslautern	2–2	Eintracht Frankfurt	Kaiserslautern, West Germany
20:00 CEST	Groh 28'; Toppmöller 43'	Report	Hölzenbein 45', 74'	Stadium: Betzenbergstadion; Attendance: 33,000; Referee: Eschweiler

7 May 1977 32	Rot-Weiss Essen	1–8	Eintracht Frankfurt	Essen, West Germany
15:30 CEST	Hrubesch 90' (pen.)	Report	Kraus 19'; Neuberger 31'; Wenzel 32', 44', 46'; Hölzenbein 42'; Grabowski 69', 72'	Stadium: Georg-Melches-Stadion; Attendance: 5,000; Referee: Lutz

14 May 1977 33	Eintracht Frankfurt	2–1	Bayern Munich	Frankfurt, West Germany
15:30 CEST	Nickel 34'; Hölzenbein 52'	Report	Rummenigge 32'	Stadium: Waldstadion; Attendance: 60,000; Referee: Walz

21 May 1977 34	Fortuna Düsseldorf	1–2	Eintracht Frankfurt	Düsseldorf, West Germany
15:30 CEST	Köhnen 78'	Report	Hölzenbein 8'; Beverungen 76'	Stadium: Rheinstadion; Attendance: 10,000; Referee: Ohmsen

==== League table ====
Pos	Team	Pld	W	D	L	GF	GA	GD	Pts	Qualification or relegation
2	Schalke 04	34	17	9	8	77	52	+25	43	Qualification to UEFA Cup first round (Note: As 1. FC Köln qualified for the Cup Winners' Cup, their UEFA Cup spot was transferred to Bayern Munich.)
3	Eintracht Braunschweig	34	15	13	6	56	38	+18	43	Qualification to UEFA Cup first round
4	Eintracht Frankfurt	34	17	8	9	86	57	+29	42	Qualification to UEFA Cup first round
5	1. FC Köln	34	17	6	11	83	61	+22	40	Qualification to Cup Winners' Cup first round (Note: Hamburger SV won the 1976–77 European Cup Winners' Cup and thereby automatically qualified as defending champions.)
6	Hamburger SV	34	14	10	10	67	56	+11	38	Qualification to Cup Winners' Cup first round

Source: www.dfb.de
Rules for classification: 1) points; 2) goal difference; 3) number of goals scored.

==== Results summary ====
Overall								Home						Away					
Pld	W	D	L	GF	GA	GD	Pts	W	D	L	GF	GA	GD	W	D	L	GF	GA	GD
34	17	8	9	86	57	+29	42	12	3	2	52	25	+27	5	5	7	34	32	+2

Source: Bundesliga

==== Results by round ====
Round	1	2	3	4	5	6	7	8	9	10	11	12	13	14	15	16	17	18	19	20	21	22	23	24	25	26	27	28	29	30	31	32	33	34
Ground	A	H	A	H	A	H	A	H	A	H	A	H	A	H	H	A	H	H	A	H	A	H	A	H	A	H	A	H	A	H	A	A	H	A
Result	L	W	L	W	L	W	L	L	L	D	L	L	L	W	W	W	D	W	D	W	D	W	D	W	W	W	W	D	D	W	D	W	W	W
Position	16	7	12	7	12	7	11	11	14	12	14	16	16	16	14	14	13	13	12	12	11	7	9	7	5	5	5	4	5	4	4	4	4	4

A = Away; H = Home; W = Win; D = Draw; L = Loss

=== DFB-Pokal ===
7 August 1976 1st Round	SV Saar 05 Saarbrücken	1–6	Eintracht Frankfurt	Saarbrücken, West Germany
18:00 CEST	Zweiacker 68'	Report	Wenzel 5', 36'; Reichel 43'; Grabowski 61', 76'; Bihn 89'	Stadium: Stadion Kieselhumes; Attendance: 2,000; Referee: Nickel

15 October 1976 2nd Round	Eintracht Frankfurt	10–2	Hertha Zehlendorf	Frankfurt, West Germany
20:00 CEST	Nickel 17' (pen.), 53'; Bihn 23', 50', 83'; Neuberger 35', 87'; Wenzel 61'; Müller 76'; Stepanović 85'	Report	Winkler 54'; Schulz 80'	Stadium: Waldstadion; Attendance: 6,000; Referee: Schumann

18 December 1976 3rd Round	SV Röchling Völklingen	2–3	Eintracht Frankfurt	Völklingen, West Germany
	Weber 28'; Spohr 69'	Report	Grabowski 37'; Weidle 41'; Neuberger 51'	Stadium: Stadion der Stadt Völklingen; Attendance: 4,000; Referee: Waltert

8 January 1977 Round of 16	FC Schalke 04	2–2 (a.e.t.)	Eintracht Frankfurt	Gelsenkirchen, West Germany
15:30 CEST	Fichtel 22'; Abramczik 44'	Report	Weidle 63'; Trinklein 74'	Stadium: Parkstadion; Attendance: 11,000; Referee: Hanschke

25 January 1977 Round of 16 Replay	Eintracht Frankfurt	4–3	FC Schalke 04	Frankfurt, West Germany
15:30 CEST	Hölzenbein 9' (pen.), 52'; Nickel 17'; Grabowski 71'	Report	Oblak 62'; Rüssmann 68'; Fischer 78'	Stadium: Waldstadion; Attendance: 27,000; Referee: Linn

19 February 1977 Quarter-finals	Bayer Uerdingen	6–3	Eintracht Frankfurt	Krefeld, West Germany
15:30 CEST	Mattson 23', 90'; Funkel 84'; Wloka 94'; Hahn 104', 120'	Report	Weidle 38'; Neuberger 51'; Nickel 69'	Stadium: Grotenburg-Stadion; Attendance: 20,000; Referee: Zuchantke

== Squad ==
=== Squad and statistics ===
No.	Pos	Nat	Player	Total		Bundesliga		DFB-Pokal	
No.	Pos	Nat	Player	Apps	Goals	Apps	Goals	Apps	Goals
	GK	(West Germany) FRG	Heinz-Josef Koitka	37	0	31	0	6	0
	GK	(West Germany) FRG	Günter Wienhold	4	0	3	0	1	0
	DF	(West Germany) FRG	Rainer Dörr	1	0	1	0	0	0
	DF	(West Germany) FRG	Charly Körbel	36	1	32	1	4	0
	DF	(West Germany) FRG	Peter Krobbach	4	0	3	0	1	0
	DF	(West Germany) FRG	Helmut Müller	18	2	17	1	1	1
	DF	(West Germany) FRG	Willi Neuberger	39	5	33	1	6	4
	DF	(West Germany) FRG	Peter Reichel	35	2	30	1	5	1
	DF	(West Germany) FRG	Gerd Simons	4	0	3	0	1	0
	DF	(West Germany) FRG	Gert Trinklein	34	2	30	1	4	1
	DF	(West Germany) FRG	Roland Weidle	37	4	31	1	6	3
	MF	(West Germany) FRG	Klaus Beverungen	4	2	3	2	1	0
	MF	(West Germany) FRG	Jürgen Grabowski	40	10	34	6	6	4
	MF	(West Germany) FRG	Wolfgang Kraus	35	10	29	10	6	0
	MF	(West Germany) FRG	Bernd Nickel	39	15	33	11	6	4
	MF	(Socialist Federal Republic of Yugoslavia) YUG	Dragoslav Stepanović	25	3	20	2	5	1
	FW	(West Germany) FRG	Egon Bihn	12	6	9	2	3	4
	FW	(West Germany) FRG	Ronny Borchers	5	0	5	0	0	0
	FW	(West Germany) FRG	Bernd Hölzenbein	35	28	30	26	5	2
	FW	(West Germany) FRG	Wilfried Stradt	3	0	2	0	1	0
	FW	(West Germany) FRG	Rüdiger Wenzel	39	23	34	20	5	3

=== Transfers ===
In:

No.	Pos.	Nation	Player
—	FW	FRG	Egon Bihr (from Kickers Offenbach)
—	DF	FRG	Rainer Dörr (from Eintracht Frankfurt Amateurs)
—	MF	YUG	Dragoslav Stepanović (from Red Star Belgrade)

Out:

No.	Pos.	Nation	Player
—	GK	FRG	Peter Kunter (retired)
—	FW	FRG	Bernd Lorenz (to BSC Young Boys)
—	FW	FRG	Wilfried Stradt (to Tennis Borussia Berlin)

== Sources ==
- Matheja, Ulrich (2011). Unsere Eintracht - Eintracht Frankfurt - Die Chronik. Die Werkstatt. ISBN 978-3-89533-750-5.
