= 1974 DFB-Pokal final =

- Match programme cover
- Event: 1973–74 DFB-Pokal
Hamburger SV	Eintracht Frankfurt
1	3
- After extra time
- Date: 17 August 1974
- Venue: Rheinstadion, Düsseldorf
- Referee: Hans-Joachim Weyland (Oberhausen)
- Attendance: 52,800

The 1974 DFB-Pokal final decided the winner of the 1973–74 DFB-Pokal, the 31st season of Germany's knockout football cup competition. It was played on 17 August 1974 at the Rheinstadion in Düsseldorf. Eintracht Frankfurt won the match 3–1 against Hamburger SV after extra time, to claim their 1st cup title.

== Route to the final ==
The DFB-Pokal began with 32 teams in a single-elimination knockout cup competition. There were a total of four rounds leading up to the final. Teams were drawn against each other, and the winner after 90 minutes would advance. If still tied, 30 minutes of extra time was played. If the score was still level, a replay would take place at the original away team's stadium. If still level after 90 minutes, 30 minutes of extra time was played. If the score was still level, a penalty shoot-out was used to determine the winner.

Note: In all results below, the score of the finalist is given first (H: home; A: away).

Hamburger SV		Round	Eintracht Frankfurt
Opponent	Result	1973–74 DFB-Pokal	Opponent	Result
Darmstadt 98 (H)	3–1	Round 1	Tennis Borussia Berlin (A)	8–1
Borussia Mönchengladbach (A) (H)	2–2 (a.e.t.); 1–1 (replay, a.e.t.) (3–1 p)	Round of 16	Hessen Kassel (A)	3–2
SG Wattenscheid 09 (A)	1–0 (a.e.t.)	Quarter-finals	1. FC Köln (H)	4–3 (a.e.t.)
Kickers Offenbach (H)	1–0	Semi-finals	Bayern Munich (H)	3–2

== Match ==
=== Details ===
17 August 1974
16:00 CET

Hamburger SV	1–3 (a.e.t.)	Eintracht Frankfurt
Bjørnmose 75'	Report	Trinklein 40'; Hölzenbein 95'; Kraus 115'

Rheinstadion, Düsseldorf
Attendance: 52,800
Referee: Hans-Joachim Weyland (Oberhausen)

Hamburger SV	Eintracht Frankfurt

GK	1	(West Germany) Rudi Kargus
RB	2	(West Germany) Manfred Kaltz
CB	3	(West Germany) Peter Nogly
CB	6	(West Germany) Klaus Winkler
LB	5	(West Germany) Hans-Jürgen Ripp
CM	4	(Denmark) Ole Bjørnmose
CM	8	(West Germany) Klaus Zaczyk
CM	10	(West Germany) Peter Krobbach	(substituted off) 68'
RW	7	(West Germany) Hans-Jürgen Sperlich
CF	9	(West Germany) Horst Bertl	(substituted off) 68'
LW	11	(West Germany) Georg Volkert (c)
Substitutes:
MF	15	(West Germany) Kurt Eigl	(substituted on) 68'
FW	12	(West Germany) Willi Reimann	(substituted on) 68'
Manager:
(West Germany) Kuno Klötzer

GK	1	(West Germany) Peter Kunter
RB	2	(West Germany) Peter Reichel	(substituted off) 106'
CB	3	(West Germany) Gert Trinklein
CB	4	(West Germany) Charly Körbel
LB	6	(West Germany) Jürgen Kalb
CM	5	(West Germany) Klaus Beverungen
CM	7	(West Germany) Bernd Nickel
CM	8	(West Germany) Roland Weidle	(substituted off) 74'
RW	10	(West Germany) Jürgen Grabowski (c)
CF	9	(West Germany) Bernd Hölzenbein
LW	11	(West Germany) Thomas Rohrbach
Substitutes:
DF	14	(West Germany) Helmut Müller	(substituted on) 106'
MF	12	(West Germany) Wolfgang Kraus	(substituted on) 74'
Manager:
(West Germany) Dietrich Weise

Match rules

- 90 minutes.
- 30 minutes of extra time if necessary.
- Replay if scores still level.
- Maximum of two substitutions.
