= 1975 DFB-Pokal final =

- Match programme cover
- Event: 1974–75 DFB-Pokal
| Eintracht Frankfurt | MSV Duisburg |
| 1 | 0 |
- Date: 21 June 1975
- Venue: Niedersachsenstadion, Hanover
- Referee: Walter Horstmann (Nordstemmen)
- Attendance: 43,000

The 1975 DFB-Pokal final decided the winner of the 1974–75 DFB-Pokal, the 32nd season of Germany's knockout football cup competition. It was played on 21 June 1975 at the Niedersachsenstadion in Hanover. Eintracht Frankfurt won the match 1–0 against MSV Duisburg, to claim their 2nd cup title.

== Route to the final ==
The DFB-Pokal began with 128 teams in a single-elimination knockout cup competition. There were a total of six rounds leading up to the final. Teams were drawn against each other, and the winner after 90 minutes would advance. If still tied, 30 minutes of extra time was played. If the score was still level, a replay would take place at the original away team's stadium. If still level after 90 minutes, 30 minutes of extra time was played. If the score was still level, a penalty shoot-out was used to determine the winner.

Note: In all results below, the score of the finalist is given first (H: home; A: away).

| Eintracht Frankfurt | | Round | MSV Duisburg |
|---|---|---|---|---|
| Opponent | Result | 1974–75 DFB-Pokal | Opponent | Result |
| Arminia Bielefeld (A) | 3–1 | Round 1 | Blumenthaler SV (A) | 3–1 |
| Union Solingen (A) | 2–1 (a.e.t.) | Round 2 | 1. FC Nürnberg (H) | 3–0 |
| 1. FC Mülheim (A) | 3–0 | Round 3 | Bayern Munich (A) | 3–2 |
| VfL Bochum (H) | 1–0 | Round of 16 | Altonaer FC von 1893 (H) | 7–0 |
| Fortuna Köln (H) | 4–2 | Quarter-finals | Werder Bremen (A) | 2–0 |
| Rot-Weiss Essen (H) | 3–1 (a.e.t.) | Semi-finals | Borussia Dortmund (H) | 2–1 (a.e.t.) |

== Match ==
=== Details ===
21 June 1975
16:00 CET

| Eintracht Frankfurt | 1–0 | MSV Duisburg |
|---|---|---|
| Körbel 57' | Report |

Niedersachsenstadion, Hanover
Attendance: 43,000
Referee: Walter Horstmann (Nordstemmen)

| Eintracht Frankfurt | MSV Duisburg |

| GK | 1 | (West Germany) Günther Wienhold |
| RB | 2 | (West Germany) Peter Reichel |
| CB | 4 | (West Germany) Charly Körbel |
| CB | 3 | (West Germany) Gert Trinklein |
| LB | 5 | (West Germany) Willi Neuberger |
| RM | 7 | (West Germany) Klaus Beverungen |
| CM | 6 | (West Germany) Roland Weidle |
| CM | 9 | (West Germany) Jürgen Grabowski (c) |
| LM | 10 | (West Germany) Bernd Nickel |
| CF | 8 | (West Germany) Bernd Hölzenbein |
| CF | 11 | (West Germany) Bernd Lorenz |
Manager:
(West Germany) Dietrich Weise

| GK | 1 | (West Germany) Dietmar Linders |
| RB | 2 | (West Germany) Werner Schneider |
| CB | 4 | (West Germany) Detlef Pirsig (c) |
| CB | 5 | (West Germany) Michael Bella |
| LB | 3 | (West Germany) Bernard Dietz |
| RM | 8 | (West Germany) Bernd Lehmann | (substituted off) 69' |
| CM | 6 | (West Germany) Klaus Bruckmann | (substituted off) 77' |
| CM | 9 | (West Germany) Ronnie Worm |
| LM | 10 | (West Germany) Theo Bücker |
| CF | 7 | (West Germany) Rudolf Seliger |
| CF | 11 | (West Germany) Klaus Thies |
Substitutes:
| DF | 12 | (Netherlands) Kees Bregman | (substituted on) 77' |
| MF | 14 | (West Germany) Walter Krause | (substituted on) 69' |
Manager:
(West Germany) Willibert Kremer

Match rules

- 90 minutes.
- 30 minutes of extra time if necessary.
- Replay if scores still level.
- Maximum of two substitutions.
