= 2023 DFB-Pokal final =

- Match programme cover
- Event: 2022–23 DFB-Pokal
RB Leipzig	Eintracht Frankfurt
2	0
- Date: 3 June 2023
- Venue: Olympiastadion, Berlin
- Referee: Daniel Siebert (Berlin)
- Attendance: 74,322

The 2023 DFB-Pokal final decided the winner of the 2022–23 DFB-Pokal, the 80th season of the annual German football cup competition. The match was played on 3 June 2023 at the Olympiastadion in Berlin.

The match featured RB Leipzig, defending champions of the competition, and Eintracht Frankfurt. RB Leipzig won the match 2–0 for their second DFB-Pokal title.

As winners, RB Leipzig qualified for the 2023 edition of the DFL-Supercup at the start of the following season, where they faced Bayern Munich, winners of the 2022–23 edition of the Bundesliga. The winners of the DFB-Pokal also earned automatic qualification for the group stage of the 2023–24 edition of the UEFA Europa League. However, as Leipzig already qualified for the 2023–24 edition of the UEFA Champions League through their position in the Bundesliga, the spot went to the team in sixth, Bayer Leverkusen, and the league's UEFA Europa Conference League play-off round spot went to the team in seventh, Eintracht Frankfurt.

== Teams ==
In the following table, finals until 1943 were in the Tschammerpokal era, since 1953 were in the DFB-Pokal era.

Team	Previous final appearances (bold indicates winners)
RB Leipzig	3 (2019, 2021, **2022**)
Eintracht Frankfurt	8 (1964, **1974**, **1975**, **1981**, **1988**, 2006, 2017, **2018**)

== Route to the final ==
The DFB-Pokal began with 64 teams in a single-elimination knockout cup competition. There were a total of five rounds leading up to the final. Teams were drawn against each other, and the winner after 90 minutes advanced. If still tied, 30 minutes of extra time were played. If the score was still level, a penalty shoot-out was used to determine the winner.

Note: In all results below, the score of the finalist is given first (H: home; A: away).

RB Leipzig		Round	Eintracht Frankfurt	
Opponent	Result	2022–23 DFB-Pokal	Opponent	Result
Teutonia Ottensen	8–0 (A)	First round	1. FC Magdeburg	4–0 (A)
Hamburger SV	4–0 (H)	Second round	Stuttgarter Kickers	2–0 (A)
1899 Hoffenheim	3–1 (H)	Round of 16	Darmstadt 98	4–2 (H)
Borussia Dortmund	2–0 (H)	Quarter-finals	Union Berlin	2–0 (H)
SC Freiburg	5–1 (A)	Semi-finals	VfB Stuttgart	3–2 (A)

== Match ==
=== Details ===
3 June 2023
20:00 CEST

RB Leipzig	2–0	Eintracht Frankfurt
Nkunku 71'; Szoboszlai 85'	Report

Olympiastadion, Berlin
Attendance: 74,322
Referee: Daniel Siebert (Berlin)

**RB Leipzig**	**Eintracht Frankfurt**

GK	21	(Germany) Janis Blaswich
RB	39	(Germany) Benjamin Henrichs
CB	16	(Germany) Lukas Klostermann
CB	4	(Hungary) Willi Orbán (c)
LB	23	(Germany) Marcel Halstenberg
CM	27	(Austria) Konrad Laimer	(yellow card) 81'
CM	8	(Mali) Amadou Haidara		(substituted off) 78'
RW	17	(Hungary) Dominik Szoboszlai		(substituted off) 90+1'
LW	7	(Spain) Dani Olmo
CF	18	(France) Christopher Nkunku	(yellow card) 90+1'
CF	11	(Germany) Timo Werner		(substituted off) 61'
Substitutes:
GK	13	(Norway) Ørjan Nyland
DF	2	(France) Mohamed Simakan
DF	22	(Germany) David Raum
DF	25	(Germany) Sanoussy Ba
DF	37	(Senegal) Abdou Diallo
MF	10	(Sweden) Emil Forsberg
MF	24	(Austria) Xaver Schlager		(substituted on) 78'
MF	44	(Slovenia) Kevin Kampl		(substituted on) 90+1'
FW	9	(Denmark) Yussuf Poulsen		(substituted on) 61'
Manager:
(Germany) Marco Rose

GK	1	(Germany) Kevin Trapp
CB	35	(Brazil) Tuta
CB	20	(Japan) Makoto Hasebe		(substituted off) 78'
CB	2	(France) Evan Ndicka
RM	24	(Portugal) Aurélio Buta		(substituted off) 87'
CM	17	(Germany) Sebastian Rode (c)		(substituted off) 70'
CM	8	(Switzerland) Djibril Sow
LM	32	(Germany) Philipp Max		(substituted off) 78'
AM	15	(Japan) Daichi Kamada
AM	27	(Germany) Mario Götze	(yellow card) 77'
CF	9	(France) Randal Kolo Muani	(yellow card) 90+2'
Substitutes:
GK	40	(Germany) Diant Ramaj
DF	18	(Mali) Almamy Touré
DF	22	(United States) Timothy Chandler
DF	25	(Germany) Christopher Lenz		(substituted on) 78'
MF	6	(Croatia) Kristijan Jakić
MF	26	(France) Junior Dina Ebimbe		(substituted on) 87'
MF	29	(Denmark) Jesper Lindstrøm		(substituted on) 70'
MF	30	(United States) Paxten Aaronson
FW	19	(Colombia) Rafael Santos Borré		(substituted on) 78'
Manager:
(Austria) Oliver Glasner

Assistant referees:
Jan Seidel (Oberkrämer)
Rafael Foltyn (Wiesbaden)
Fourth official:
Daniel Schlager (Hügelsheim)
Reserve assistant referee:
Lasse Koslowski (Berlin)
Video assistant referee:
Marco Fritz (Korb)
Assistant video assistant referee:
Dominik Schaal (Tübingen)

**Match rules**

- 90 minutes.
- 30 minutes of extra time if necessary.
- Penalty shoot-out if scores still level.
- Nine named substitutes.
- Maximum of five substitutions. (Note: Each team was given only three opportunities to make substitutions, with a fourth opportunity in extra time, excluding substitutions made at half-time, before the start of extra time and at half-time in extra time.)

== See also ==
- 2023 DFL-Supercup
- Football in Berlin
