= Ezhar Cezairli =

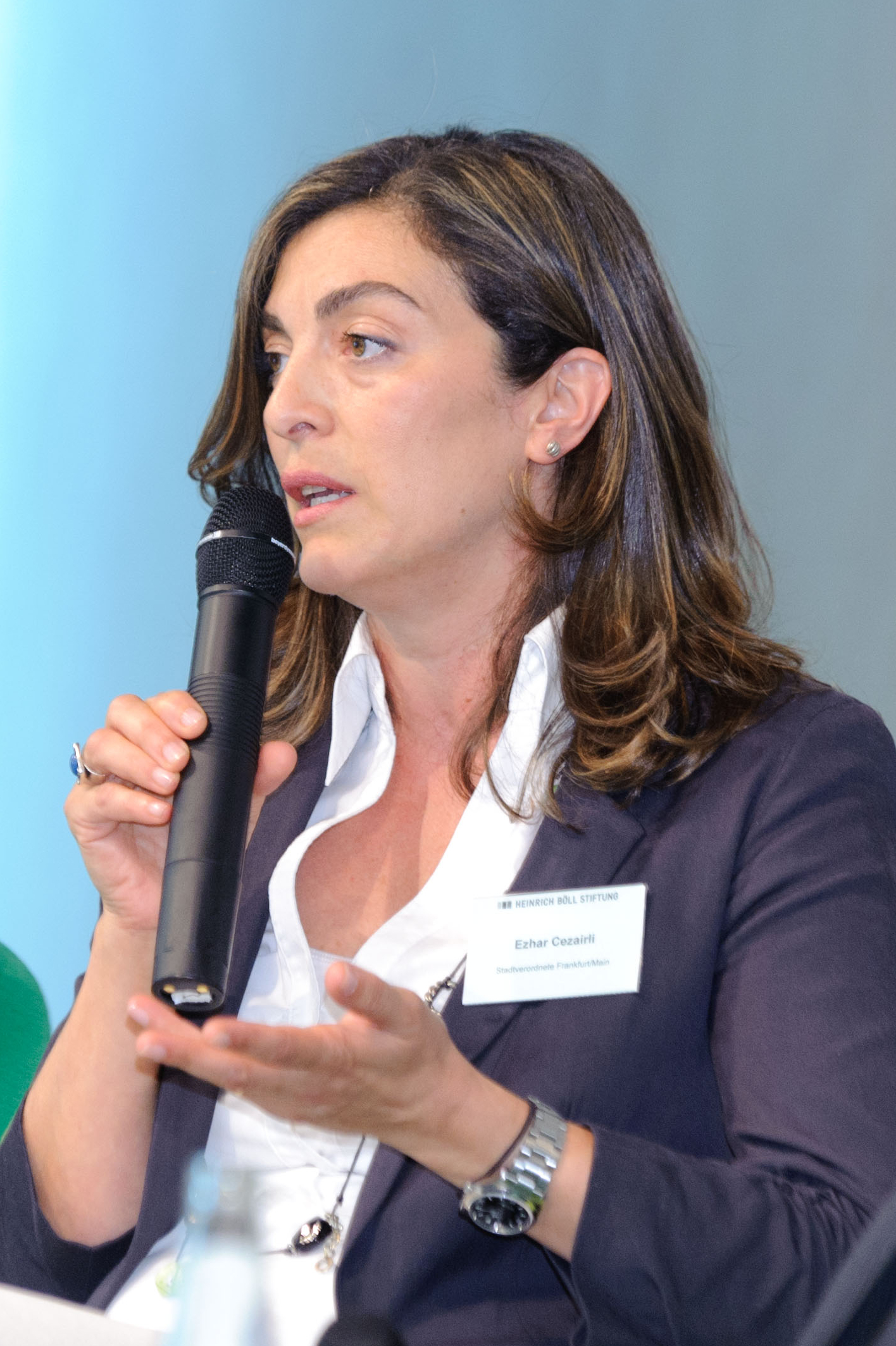
Ezhar Cezairli (2011)

Ezhar Cezairli (born December 12, 1962, in Antakya; died February 9, 2021, in Frankfurt am Main) was a German-Turkish dentist, cultural activist, and, as a representative of secular Muslims, a member of the German Islam Conference and a local politician for the CDU in Frankfurt am Main. She was chairwoman of the Turkish-German Club Frankfurt e.V. and co-founder of the "Frankfurt Initiative of Progressive Women".

Cezairli came to Weil am Rhein from Turkey in 1970. According to her own account, she was the first and only Turkish student at her high school. She studied dentistry in Hanover, initially working as an employed dentist in the practice of Peter Kunter, and ran her own practice in Frankfurt's city center from 1998. Cezairli was married and leaves behind two children. She considered herself a secular Muslim. She defined herself not by her religious affiliation, but by her belonging to society. Religion was a private matter for her.

She represented the positions of secular and liberal Muslims within the German Islam Conference. She was a member of the "Initiative of Secular and Laicist Citizens from Islamic Countries of Origin in Hesse," whose principles include the separation of religion and state, the rejection of religiously motivated violence, a commitment to the Basic Law for the Federal Republic of Germany, the equality of men and women, and the right to freedom of religion. The initiative advocates, among other things, religious education in the Federal Republic of Germany and criticized the claim of the Coordinating Council of Muslims in Germany to speak for all Muslims in Germany. It is not in accordance with Islam, Cezairli argued, for an institution to come between God and the individual. The initiative also opposes restricting compulsory schooling for Muslim children regarding physical education, swimming, and sex education, as well as addressing the history of antisemitism since 1945.

In the municipal elections on March 27, 2011, she was elected to the Frankfurt City Council via the CDU list. There, she served on the Committee for Education and Integration and the Committee for Economic Affairs and Women. Ezhar Cezairli died in February 2021 after a serious illness at the age of 58.
