= TuS Dehrn =

German football club

- Full name: Turn- und Sportverein 1905 Dehrn e.V.
- Founded: 1905
- Ground: Sportplatz an der Lahnbrücke
- Chairman: Georg Heun
- Manager: Matthias Sehr
- League: Kreisoberliga Limburg-Weilburg (VIII)
- 2015–16: 11th
Home colours	Away colours

TuS Dehrn is a German association football club from the Dehrn quarter in the city of Runkel, Hesse.

== History ==
The club was established as the gymnastics club Germania Dehrn on 16 July 1905 and is today a sports club of over 1000 members that in addition to its football side has departments for gymnastics, karate, and table tennis, as well as offering fitness programs.

The football department was established late in the history of the club (1945) following World War II and it was at this time that the current name of the association was adopted. Throughout their history, the footballers have played as a lower tier local side and today compete in the Kreisoberliga Limburg-Weilburg (IX).

== Famous players ==
- Bernd Hölzenbein, played for Bundesliga side Eintracht Frankfurt and earned 40 caps with Germany
