= Aleksandr Kolpovski =

Russian footballer (1953–2015)

Aleksandr Alekseyevich Kolpovski (Russian: Александр Алексеевич Колповский; 27 February 1953 – 23 September 2015) was a Russian footballer in the Soviet era. He played on the position of the defense and midfield, and he was best known for his performances for CSKA Moscow in the 1970s.

== Career ==
Kolpovski was born in Gorky, but his parents moved to Khor, Khabarovsk Krai in his youth. Kolpovski began playing professional football with SKA-Khabarovsk in 1973. He scored 26 league goals over three seasons before joining Soviet Top League side CSKA.

Kolpovski scored a goal on his debut for CSKA, in a 1/16-round 1976 Soviet Cup match against Torpedo Kutaisi. He would score five goals in 89 Soviet Top League matches over five seasons with CSKA.

In 1980, Kolpovski, an officer in the Soviet Army, left CSKA to be stationed in East Germany for four years. During this time he played for local East German amateur football clubs, VfL Nauen and SV Stahl Thale, with the latter in the second tier DDR-Liga.

Upon his return to the Soviet Union in 1984, Koplovski rejoined SKA-Khabarovsk, now playing the Soviet First League. He played for four more seasons in his second stint with SKA, before retiring.

Kolpovski managed CSKA's reserve team before leading Russian Second Division side FC Volochanin-Ratmir Vyshny Volochyok during 1995.

== Death ==
He died in Moscow in September 2015.
