= Raimund Krauth =

German footballer

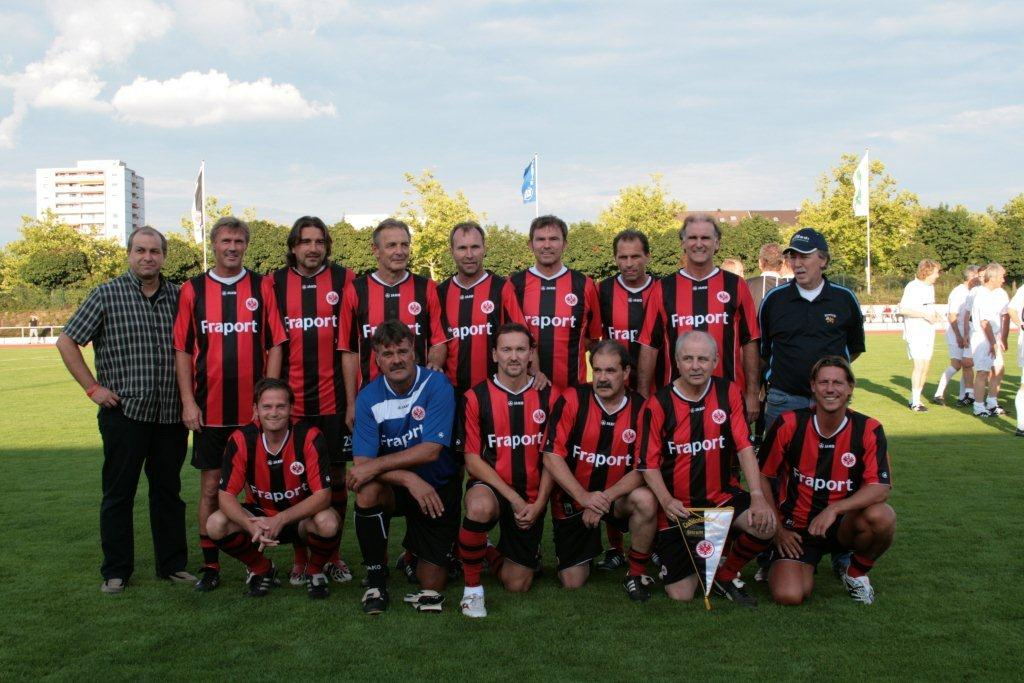

Personal information
- Date of birth: 27 December 1952
- Place of birth: Karlsruhe, West Germany
- Date of death: 22 November 2012 (aged 59)
- Place of death: Karlsruhe, Germany
- Height: 1.78 m (5 ft 10 in)
- Position: Striker

Senior career*
Years	Team	Apps	(Gls)
1972–1974	Eintracht Frankfurt	23	(1)
1974–1975	FK Pirmasens	33	(12)
1975–1982	Karlsruher SC	168	(50)
Total		224	(63)
- * Club domestic league appearances and goals

Raimund Krauth (27 December 1952 – 22 November 2012) was a German professional footballer who played as a striker.

== Career ==
Krauth played for Eintracht Frankfurt, FK Pirmasens and Karlsruher SC.

== Later life and death ==
Krauth died on 22 November 2012.
