= Jürgen Grabowski =

German footballer (1944–2022)

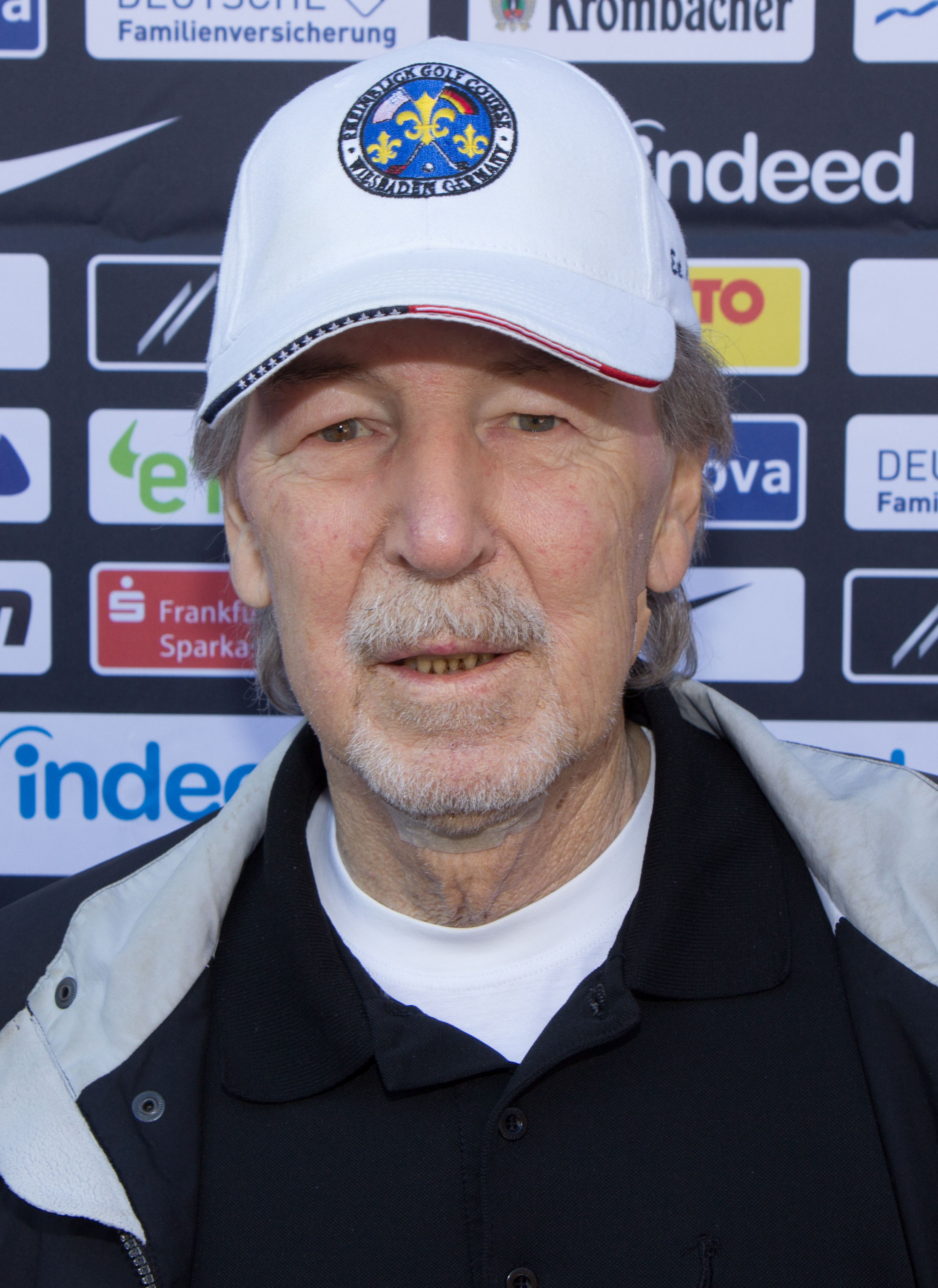
- Grabowski in 2018

Personal information
- Date of birth: 7 July 1944
- Place of birth: Wiesbaden, Germany
- Date of death: 10 March 2022 (aged 77)
- Place of death: Wiesbaden, Germany
- Height: 1.75 m (5 ft 9 in)
- Positions: Forward; midfielder

Youth career
- 1952–1960: SV 1919 Biebrich
- 1960–1965: FV Biebrich 02

Senior career*
Years	Team	Apps	(Gls)
1965–1980	Eintracht Frankfurt	441	(109)

International career
1965	West Germany Amateur	1	(0)
1967	West Germany U23	1	(0)
1966–1974	West Germany	44	(5)

Managerial career
- 1977: Eintracht Frankfurt (caretaker)
Medal record
Men's football
Representing West Germany
FIFA World Cup
Runner-up	1966 England
Third place	1970 Mexico
Winner	1974 West Germany
UEFA European Championship
Winner	1972 Belgium
- * Club domestic league appearances and goals

Jürgen Grabowski (7 July 1944 – 10 March 2022) was a German footballer. He played for Eintracht Frankfurt. He won gold medals playing for the West Germany national football team that won the European championship in 1972 and the FIFA World Cup in 1974. Grabowski is considered the greatest Eintracht Frankfurt player ever.

== Biography ==
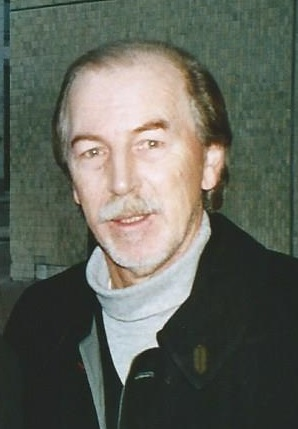
Grabowski in 2005

Grabowski was born in Wiesbaden, West Germany. Grabowski, originally a forward, then later an attacking midfielder or a winger, started his career with SV Biebrich 1919 and FV Biebrich 1902 of Wiesbaden. In 1965, he joined Eintracht Frankfurt. With this team he won the German Cup in 1974 and 1975 and the UEFA Europa League in 1980. Injury prevented him from participating in the 1980 UEFA Cup finals.

In European Cup competitions he made 40 appearances and scored nine goals.

He played 44 caps for the West Germany national team and scored five goals. He was a member of the squad that finished second in the World Cup tournaments of 1966, when he did not play. In Mexico 1970, Grabowski was called the best substitute in the world. In the game against Italy, Grabowski hit the cross to defender Karl-Heinz Schnellinger. The German professional, who played for an Italian club, scored the equalizing goal in the last second. The semi-final game was lost 4–3 after extra time. In 1972, he became European champion. Grabowski was also participant at the 1974 FIFA World Cup in Germany. In 1974, he scored in West Germany's 4–2 win over Sweden in the second round. On his 30th birthday, he and his Eintracht teammate Bernd Hölzenbein became world champions on 7 July 1974 at the Munich Olympic Stadium.

His career ended in 1980 after he was injured by Lothar Matthäus. For a short time he was manager of Eintracht Frankfurt. Grabowski was honorary captain of Eintracht.

Grabowski lived in Taunusstein, Hesse. In his last years, he was a dialysis patient. He died in Wiesbaden on 10 March 2022, at the age of 77.

== Honours ==
Eintracht Frankfurt

- UEFA Cup: 1979–80
- DFB-Pokal: 1973–74, 1974–75

West Germany

- FIFA World Cup: 1974
- UEFA European Championship: 1972

Individual

- kicker Bundesliga Team of the Season: 1966–67, 1969–70, 1970–71, 1971–72, 1972–73, 1973–74, 1974–75, 1977–78
- 3 December 2014 Hessian Order of Merit
