= Thomas Rohrbach =

German footballer (born 1949)

Personal information
- Date of birth: 4 April 1949 (age 77)
- Place of birth: Bad Hersfeld, Germany
- Height: 1.70 m (5 ft 7 in)
- Position: Midfielder

Senior career*
Years	Team	Apps	(Gls)
1967–1968	Borussia Fulda		
1968–1970	RSV Göttingen 05		
1970–1975	Eintracht Frankfurt	134	(16)
1975–1978	Ethnikos Piraeus	72	(11)
1978–1980	Olympiacos	10	(0)
1980–1981	SSV Ulm	28	(7)
1981–1985	Hessen Bad Hersfeld		
- * Club domestic league appearances and goals

Thomas Rohrbach (born 4 April 1949) is a German retired professional footballer who played as a midfielder during the 1970s and 1980s.

== Career ==
Rohrbach played for Eintracht Frankfurt in the Bundesliga between 1970 and 1975, winning the DFB-Pokal twice. He moved to Greece in the summer of 1975 and played for Ethnikos Piraeus from 1975 until 1978 and for Olympiacos from 1978 to 1980.

After the 1980 season, Rohrbach returned to Germany where he played for SSV Ulm in the 2. Bundesliga, and would end his career with lower league clubs Hessen Bad Hersfeld and FC Rhein-Main.

== Honours ==
Eintracht Frankfurt

- DFB-Pokal
  - Winner: 1973–74, 1974–75

Olympiacos

- Alpha Ethniki
  - Winner: 1979–80
  - Runner-up: 1978–79
