= Volker Ohling =

German footballer

Personal information
- Date of birth: 17 January 1955 (age 71)
- Place of birth: Germany
- Position: Forward

Senior career*
Years	Team	Apps	(Gls)
1973–1977	Werder Bremen	53	(8)
1977–1979	OSC Bremerhaven		
1979–1980	Bremer SV		
1980–1984	VfB Oldenburg		
- * Club domestic league appearances and goals

Volker Ohling (born 17 January 1955) is a German former professional footballer who played as a forward for Werder Bremen.
