= FV Biebrich =

German football club

- Full name: Fussballverein Biebrich 1902 e.V.
- Founded: 1902
- Ground: Dyckerhoff-Sportfeld
- League: Verbandsliga Hessen-Mitte (VI)
- 2015–16: 9th
Home colours	Away colours

FV Biebrich is a German association football club from the town of Biebrich part of Wiesbaden, Hesse.

== History ==
The club was founded on 10 November 1902 as Biebricher Fußballclub and took on the name Biebricher Fußballverein 1902 on 7 April 1913.

In 1957, the club became part of the Amateurliga Hessen (II) which became a third tier circuit after the introduction of the country's new Bundesliga (I) and two Regionalliga (II). FV disappeared into lower level local play after being demoted in 1968. Their best result during their time in the Amateurliga was a fourth-place finish.

Nowadays the club plays in the tier six Verbandsliga Hessen-Mitte.
