= Egon Köhnen =

German footballer

Personal information
- Date of birth: 24 November 1947 (age 78)
- Height: 1.74 m (5 ft 8 1/2 in)
- Position: Defender

Senior career*
Years	Team	Apps	(Gls)
1966–1981	Fortuna Düsseldorf	272	(12)
1981–1982	Bayer 05 Uerdingen	30	(1)
- * Club domestic league appearances and goals

Egon Köhnen (born 24 November 1947) is a retired German footballer.

He played for Fortuna Düsseldorf between 1966 and 1981, playing 272 Bundesliga games and scoring 12 goals. He helped the team winning the DFB-Pokal in 1978–79 and 1979–80.
