= Manfred Ritschel =

German footballer (1946–2026)

Personal information
- Date of birth: 7 June 1946
- Place of birth: Schwabach, Allied-occupied Germany
- Date of death: 26 June 2026 (aged 80)
- Height: 1.74 m (5 ft 9 in)
- Position: Right winger

Senior career*
Years	Team	Apps	(Gls)
- SV Unterreichenbach
- FC Stein
- ESV Ingolstadt
1968–1970	Jahn Regensburg		
1970–1972	Borussia Dortmund	57	(6)
1972–1976	Kickers Offenbach	128	(25)
1976–1977	1. FC Kaiserslautern	24	(2)
1977–1978	Schalke 04	22	(0)
1978–1982	SpVgg Fürth	108	(9)

International career
1975	West Germany	3	(1)
- * Club domestic league appearances and goals

Manfred Ritschel (7 June 1946 – 26 June 2026) was a German professional footballer who played as a right winger. He spent eight seasons in the Bundesliga with Borussia Dortmund, Kickers Offenbach, 1. FC Kaiserslautern and Schalke 04. He represented West Germany three times, including an UEFA Euro 1976 qualifier against Bulgaria (he scored an equalizer in a 1–1 draw) and two friendlies. Ritschel died on 26 June 2026, at the age of 80.
