= Wolfgang Kraus =

German footballer

Personal information
- Full name: Wolfgang Kraus
- Date of birth: 20 August 1953 (age 73)
- Place of birth: Frankfurt, West Germany
- Height: 1.73 m (5 ft 8 in)
- Position: Midfielder

Youth career
- 1964–1971: Eintracht Frankfurt

Senior career*
Years	Team	Apps	(Gls)
1971–1979	Eintracht Frankfurt	174	(29)
1979–1984	Bayern Munich	138	(17)
1984–1986	FC Zürich		
1986–1987	Eintracht Frankfurt	15	(1)
- * Club domestic league appearances and goals

Wolfgang Kraus (born 20 August 1953) is a former German football player.

The son of the former Frankfurt footballer Willi 'Scheppe' Kraus (born 3 December 1926, died 1993) appeared in 326 Bundesliga matches for Eintracht Frankfurt and Bayern Munich and scored 47 goals. Mostly he was used in the midfield.

After his active career he became in November 1986 sports director at Frankfurt but was fired in September 1988 after less than two years. The reason was the sale of star player and idol of the public Lajos Détári. Kraus later stated that he had nothing to do with the sale of Détari.

== Honours ==
Bayern Munich

- Bundesliga: 1979–80, 1980–81
- DFB-Pokal: 1981–82, 1983–84
- European Cup: runner-up 1981–82

Eintracht Frankfurt

- DFB-Pokal: 1973–74, 1974–75
