= Jürgen Kalb =

German footballer

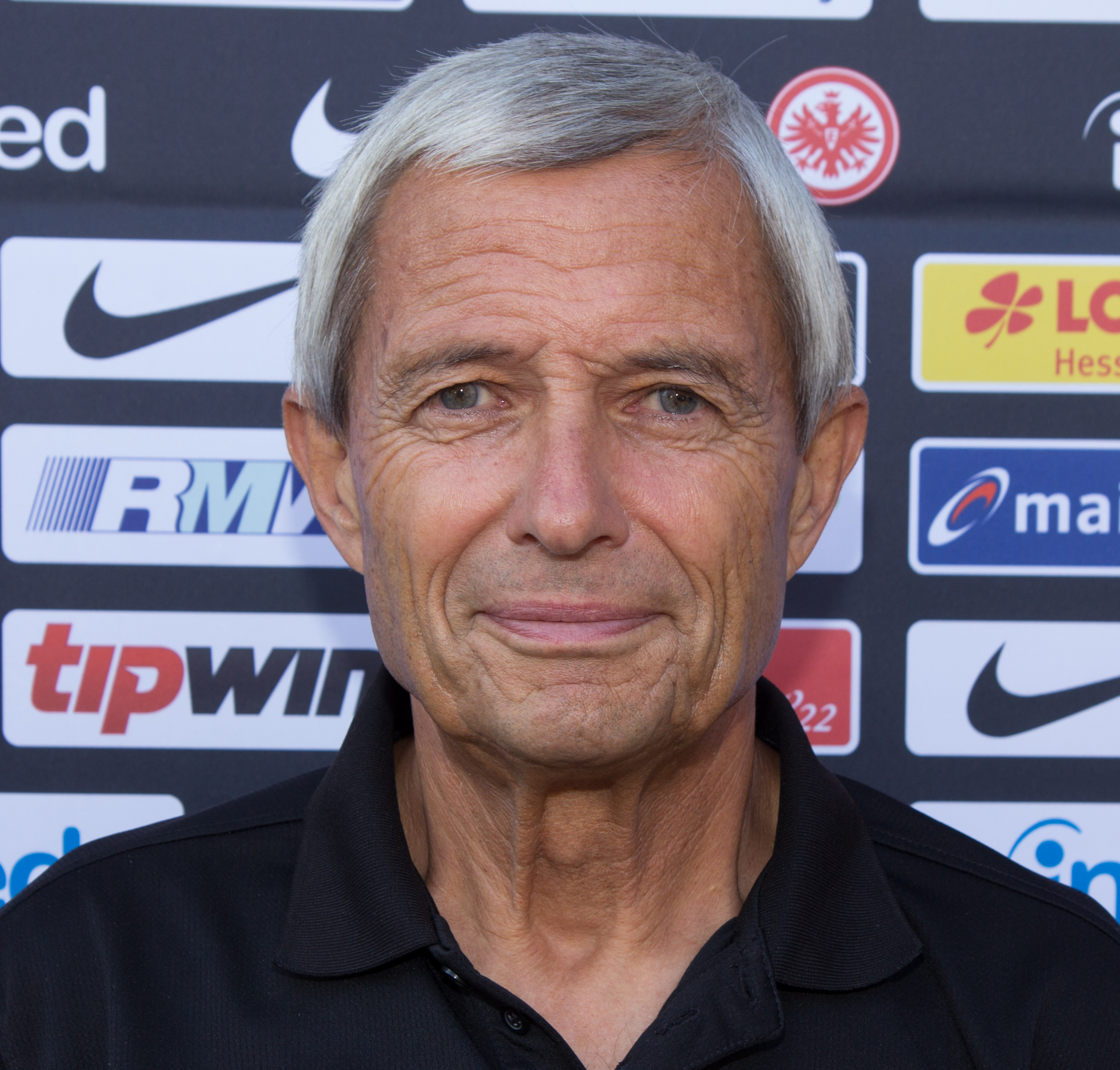
- Jürgen Kalb in 2018

Personal information
- Date of birth: 20 May 1948 (age 78)
- Place of birth: Frankfurt, Germany
- Position: Midfielder

Senior career*
Years	Team	Apps	(Gls)
–1967	VfB Unterliederbach		
1967–1975	Eintracht Frankfurt		
1975–1978	Karlsruher SC		
1978–1980	SV Darmstadt 98		
1980–1981	VfB Unterliederbach		
1981–1984	FC Hanau 93		
1984–1986	VfB Unterliederbach		

International career
- West Germany
- * Club domestic league appearances and goals

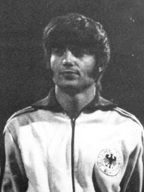
Jürgen Kalb in 1971

Jürgen Kalb (born 20 May 1948) is a German footballer. He competed in the men's tournament at the 1972 Summer Olympics.
