= Roland Weidle =

German footballer (born 1949)

Personal information
- Date of birth: 1 January 1949 (age 77)
- Place of birth: Stuttgart, West Germany
- Height: 1.80 m (5 ft 11 in)
- Positions: Forward; midfielder

Youth career
- 1959–1966: TSV Rohr
- 1966–1967: VfB Stuttgart

Senior career*
| Years | Team | Apps | (Gls) |
| 1967–1971 | VfB Stuttgart | 27 | (2) |
| 1971–1978 | Eintracht Frankfurt | 198 | (17) |
| 1978–1980 | Arminia Bielefeld | 51 | (1) |
| 1980–1985 | Bellinzona | 110+ | (19+) |
| 1985–1986 | FC Ascona | | |
| 1986–1989 | Biel-Bienne | | |
| 1989–2001 | FC Aarberg | | |

Managerial career
- 1986–1989: Biel-Bienne (player-manager)
- 2001–2007: FC Aarberg
- * Club domestic league appearances and goals

Roland Weidle (born 1 January 1949) is a German former football manager and footballer who played as a forward and midfielder.

== Career ==
Weidle made his European debut for Eintracht Frankfurt in the 1972–73 UEFA Cup against Liverpool. During the second leg of the 1975–76 European Cup Winners' Cup semi-finals against West Ham United, Weidle missed an easy shot shortly before the end of the match, which would have allowed Eintracht Frankfurt to make the final.

In 1978, he joined Arminia Bielefeld following the end of his contract, after renegotiations with Frankfurt fell through. He spent two years at Bielefeld, helping them win the 1979–80 2. Bundesliga Nord title, before joining Bellinzona in Switzerland.

In both the 1981–82 and 1982–83 seasons, Weidle was nominated for the Swiss Foreigner of the Year award, but finished in fifth both times.

Between 1986 and 1989, he served as the player-manager of Biel-Bienne. Afterwards, he continued playing for another 12 years in Switzerland with FC Aarberg, where after retiring, he became their manager. As of 2021, he was the sporting director of FC Aarberg.

== Personal life ==
Following his transfer to Bellinzona, Weidle permanently settled in Switzerland.

== Honours ==
Eintracht Frankfurt

- DFB-Pokal: 1973–74, 1974–75

Arminia Bielefeld

- 2. Bundesliga Nord: 1979–1980
