= Uwe Kliemann =

German footballer and coach

Personal information
- Date of birth: 30 June 1949 (age 77)
- Place of birth: Berlin, Germany
- Height: 1.96 m (6 ft 5 in)
- Position: Central defender

Senior career*
| Years | Team | Apps | (Gls) |
| 1968–1970 | Hertha Zehlendorf | | |
| 1970–1972 | Rot-Weiß Oberhausen | 56 | (4) |
| 1972–1974 | Eintracht Frankfurt | 68 | (8) |
| 1974–1980 | Hertha BSC | 168 | (13) |
| 1980–1981 | Arminia Bielefeld | 0 | (0) |

International career
| 1975 | Germany | 1 | (0) |

Managerial career
- 1984–1985: Hertha BSC
- 1985–1986: SpVgg Bayreuth
- Eintracht Braunschweig (youth and assistant)
- 1993: TSV Havelse
- VfL Wolfsburg (youth and assistant)
- * Club domestic league appearances and goals

Uwe Kliemann (born 30 June 1949) is a German former professional footballer who played as a central defender. and coach. As a player, he spent 11 seasons in the Bundesliga with Rot-Weiß Oberhausen, Eintracht Frankfurt, Hertha BSC and Arminia Bielefeld. He represented Germany once, in a friendly against Netherlands.

== Honours ==
- Bundesliga runner-up: 1974–75
- DFB-Pokal finalist: 1976–77, 1978–79
