= Peter Kunter =

German footballer (1941–2024)

Personal information
- Date of birth: 28 April 1941
- Place of birth: Berlin, Germany
- Date of death: 18 March 2024 (aged 82)
- Height: 1.73 m (5 ft 8 in)
- Position: Goalkeeper

Youth career
- –1961: Eintracht Wetzlar

Senior career*
Years	Team	Apps	(Gls)
1961–1965	Freiburger FC	133	(0)
1965–1977	Eintracht Frankfurt	234	(0)
Total		367	(0)
- * Club domestic league appearances and goals

Peter Kunter (28 April 1941 – 18 March 2024) was a German professional footballer who played as a goalkeeper, spending most of his career with Eintracht Frankfurt.

== Career ==
Kunter was born in Berlin, Germany. Playing for Eintracht Wetzlar, he was capped for the German youth national team in 1958, making nine appearances. Afterwards he played four times for the amateur national team. From 1961 on, Kunter studied dentistry, sports and German studies in Freiburg while playing for second-tier Freiburger FC. For Freiburger FC he made 133 league appearances.

In 1965, he moved to Eintracht Frankfurt, amassing 234 Bundesliga games and 17 games in DFB-Pokal and UEFA Cup/Cup Winners Cup. In December 1969, he received a doctorate of dentistry. He played in the final of the first DFB-Pokal win of the Eagles in 1974 against the Hamburger SV. The next time one year later against MSV Duisburg he was a substitute.

At 1.73 metres, Kunter was some inches too small to seriously compete with his rivals in the national team (Maier, Nigbur, Kleff, Franke) and never played for the senior national team.

Kunter retired in 1976. Between 1977 and 1979, he was vice chairman of Eintracht Frankfurt and from 2001 until 2005 he was a member of the club's administrative board.

== Death ==
Kunter died on 18 March 2024, at the age of 82.

== Honours ==
Eintracht Frankfurt

- DFB-Pokal: 1973–74, 1974–75
- UEFA Intertoto Cup: 1966–67
