= Günter Wienhold =

German footballer (1948–2021)

Personal information
- Date of birth: 21 January 1948
- Place of birth: Duisburg, Germany
- Date of death: 21 September 2021 (aged 73)
- Height: 1.80 m (5 ft 11 in)
- Position: Goalkeeper

Senior career*
| Years | Team | Apps | (Gls) |
| 1968–1972 | FC Singen 04 | | |
| 1972–1978 | Eintracht Frankfurt | | |
| 1978–1985 | SC Freiburg | | |
| 1989–1990 | SC Freiburg | | |

International career
| 1972 | West Germany Olympic | 5 | (0) |
- * Club domestic league appearances and goals

Günter Wienhold (21 January 1948 – 21 September 2021) was a German footballer who played as a goalkeeper. He competed in the men's tournament at the 1972 Summer Olympics. He died on 21 September 2021, at the age of 73.
