= Gert Trinklein =

German footballer

Personal information
- Full name: Gert Trinklein
- Date of birth: 19 June 1949
- Place of birth: Frankfurt, West Germany
- Date of death: 11 July 2017 (aged 68)
- Position: Defender

Youth career
- –1967: Rot-Weiß Frankfurt
- 1967–1968: Eintracht Frankfurt

Senior career*
| Years | Team | Apps | (Gls) |
| 1968–1978 | Eintracht Frankfurt | 230 | (10) |
| 1978–1979 | Kickers Offenbach | 6 | (0) |
| 1979–1980 | Dallas Tornado | 56 | (2) |
- * Club domestic league appearances and goals

Gert Trinklein (19 June 1949 – 11 July 2017) was a German football player.

Between 1969 and 1978 Trinklein appeared in 230 matches for Eintracht Frankfurt. In 1979, he moved to the USA, becoming the third German soccer pro besides Franz Beckenbauer and Gerd Müller. Since 1985 he was an independent tradesman and merchandises at sport events. Since 2006 Gert Trinklein was part of the FDP fraction in Frankfurt parliament.

He died in the night from the 11 to 12 July due to his Leukemia disease which was diagnosed in 2011.

== Honours ==
Eintracht Frankfurt

- DFB-Pokal
  - Winner: 1974–75, 1974–75

Dallas Tornado

- North American Soccer League, Central Division
  - Winner: 1980
