= Bernd Hölzenbein =

German footballer (1946–2024)

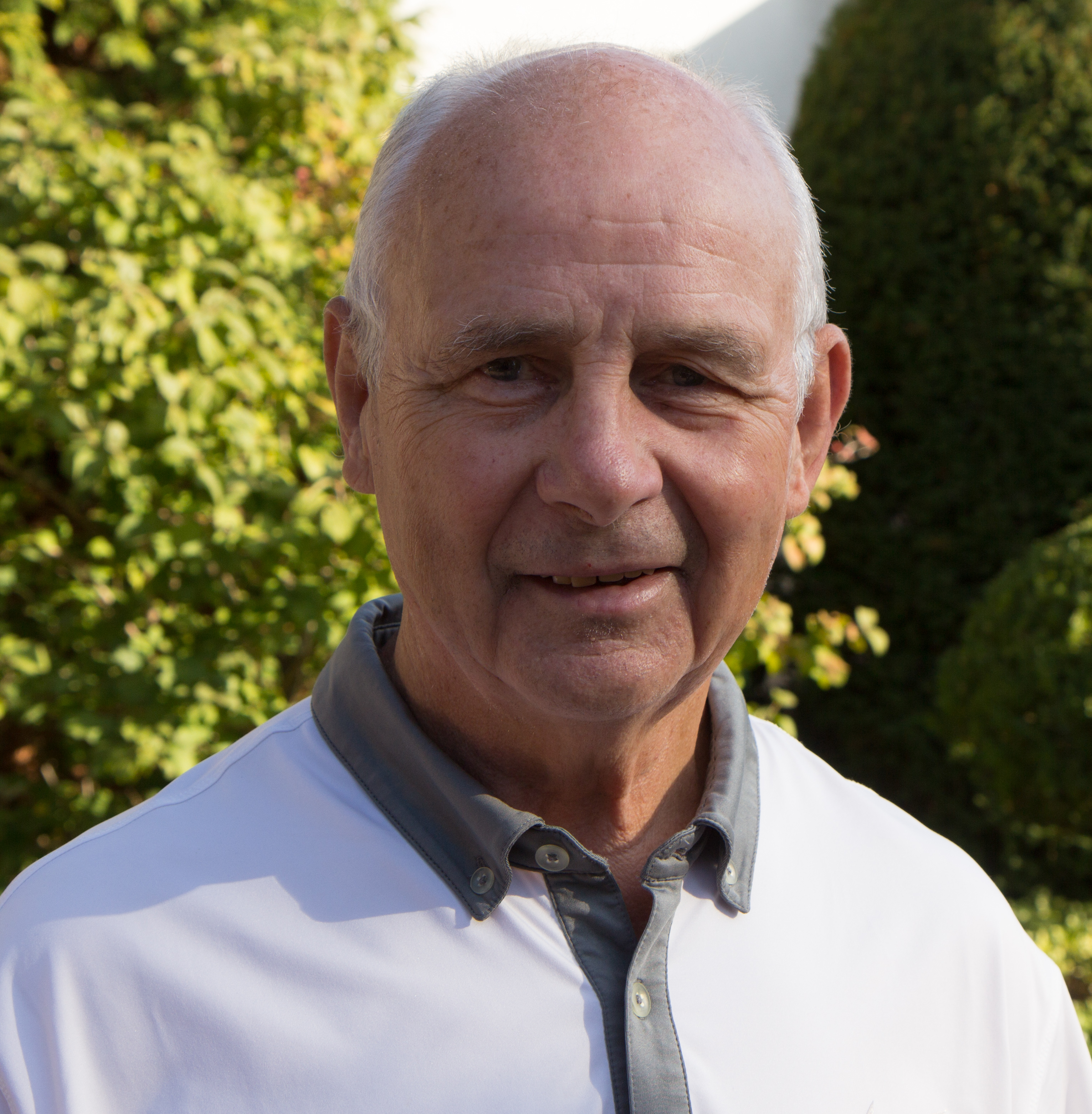
- Hölzenbein in 2018

Personal information
- Date of birth: 9 March 1946
- Place of birth: Dehrn, Greater Hesse, Allied-occupied Germany
- Date of death: 15 April 2024 (aged 78)
- Height: 1.72 m (5 ft 8 in)
- Positions: Winger; striker

Youth career
- 1956–1966: TuS Dehrn
- 1966–1967: Eintracht Frankfurt

Senior career*
Years	Team	Apps	(Gls)
1967–1981	Eintracht Frankfurt	420	(160)
1981–1982	Fort Lauderdale Strikers	46	(10)
1982?–1984?	Memphis Americans	89	(41)
1984?–1985?	Baltimore Blast	24	(4)
1986	FSV Salmrohr		
Total		579	(215)

International career
1973–1978	West Germany	40	(5)
Medal record
Men's football
Representing West Germany
FIFA World Cup
Winner	1974 West Germany
UEFA European Championship
Runner-up	1976 Yugoslavia
- * Club domestic league appearances and goals

Bernd Hölzenbein (9 March 1946 – 15 April 2024) was a German professional footballer who played as a striker or winger. He played for Eintracht Frankfurt from 1967 to 1981 and is the club's all-time Bundesliga top scorer, having tallied 160 goals in 420 league matches. At the international level, Hölzenbein was a member of the West German team that won the World Cup in 1974. He was fouled in the final against the Netherlands, which led to the Germans' equalizing penalty.

== Playing career ==
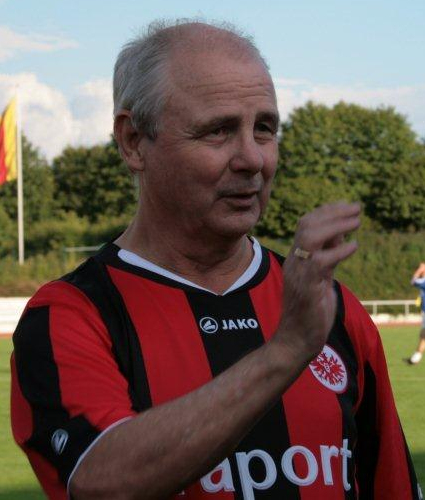
Hölzenbein in 2010

A qualified merchant, Hölzenbein debuted for Eintracht Frankfurt in the Bundesliga in 1967 to serve for this club until his departure in 1981. A three times German Cup winner with them in 1974, 1975 and 1981, Hölzenbein also won the UEFA Cup with Frankfurt in 1980. His output of 160 goals in his 420 Bundesliga matches is still club record achievement for Frankfurt.

Hölzenbein joined Fort Lauderdale Strikers in the United States in 1981. He later played for Memphis Americans and Baltimore Blast in the Major Indoor Soccer League.

In his international career, Hölzenbein scored five goals in forty appearances for West Germany between 1973 and 1978. He made six appearances at the 1974 World Cup finals, including the final. He also played in the UEFA Euro 1976 Final where he scored the equalizing goal in a 2–2 draw against Czechoslovakia, which West Germany lost on penalties. However, he was the oldest player to score in a Euro final, aged 30 years and 103 days.

== Death ==
Hölzenbein died from complications of dementia on 15 April 2024, at the age of 78.

== Honours ==
Eintracht Frankfurt

- UEFA Cup: 1979–80
- DFB-Pokal: 1973–74, 1974–75, 1980–81

West Germany

- FIFA World Cup: 1974

Individual

- kicker Bundesliga Team of the Season: 1976
