= 1973–74 DFB-Pokal =

Tournament details
- Country: West Germany
- Teams: 32

Final positions
- Champions: Eintracht Frankfurt
- Runners-up: Hamburger SV

Tournament statistics
- Matches played: 38

The 1973–74 DFB-Pokal was the 31st season of the annual German football cup competition. It began on 1 December 1973 and ended on 17 August 1974. 32 teams competed in the tournament of five rounds. In the final Eintracht Frankfurt defeated Hamburger SV 3–1 after extra time.

== Mode ==
The tournament consisted of five single elimination rounds. In case a game ended with a draw 30 minutes of extra time were played. If the score was still level the game was replayed with 30 minutes of extra time in case of another draw. If still no winner could be determined, a penalty shootout decided which team advanced to the next round.

== Matches ==
=== First round ===
1 December 1973
| TuS Neuendorf | 0 – 2 | Wuppertaler SV Borussia |
| FC Schalke 04 | 1 – 2 | SG Wattenscheid 09 |
| FC Bayern Munich | 3 – 1 | MSV Duisburg |
| Arminia Bielefeld | 2 – 1 | Alemannia Aachen |
| Tennis Borussia Berlin | 1 – 8 | Eintracht Frankfurt |
| 1. FC Nürnberg | 4 – 1 | 1. FSV Mainz 05 |
| VfB Oldenburg | 0 – 6 | Borussia Mönchengladbach |
| SC Fortuna Köln | 3 – 2 | VfB Stuttgart | (AET) |
| 1. FC Kaiserslautern | 5 – 3 | Rot-Weiß Essen | (AET) |
| Hertha BSC | 2 – 2 | Fortuna Düsseldorf | (AET) |
| Hamburger SV | 3 – 1 | SV Darmstadt 98 |
| Borussia Dortmund | 1 – 4 | Hannover 96 |
| Kickers Offenbach | 2 – 2 | VfR Heilbronn | (AET) |
| KSV Hessen Kassel | 2 – 1 | HSV Barmbeck-Uhlenhorst |
| VfL Bochum | 2 – 2 | SV Werder Bremen | (AET) |
3 December 1973
| 1. FC Köln | 2 – 0 | Eintracht Braunschweig |

==== Replays ====
4 December 1973
| Fortuna Düsseldorf | 1 – 1 | Hertha BSC | (AET) (Hertha BSC won 3 – 1 on penalties) |
| SV Werder Bremen | 2 – 1 | VfL Bochum |
10 December 1973
| VfR Heilbronn | 2 – 3 | Kickers Offenbach | (AET) |

=== Round of 16 ===
15 December 1973
| 1. FC Köln | 1 – 0 | Wuppertaler SV Borussia |
| SV Werder Bremen | 1 – 2 | FC Bayern Munich |
| KSV Hessen Kassel | 2 – 3 | Eintracht Frankfurt |
| Borussia Mönchengladbach | 2 – 2 | Hamburger SV | (AET) |
| SG Wattenscheid 09 | 1 – 0 | Hertha BSC |
19 December 1973
| SC Fortuna Köln | 0 – 0 | Hannover 96 | (AET) |
22 December 1973
| Arminia Bielefeld | 1 – 1 | 1. FC Kaiserslautern | (AET) |
| Kickers Offenbach | 3 – 2 | 1. FC Nürnberg |

==== Replays ====
22 December 1973
| Hamburger SV | 1 – 1 | Borussia Mönchengladbach | (AET) (Hamburger SV won 3 – 1 on penalties) |
29 December 1973
| 1. FC Kaiserslautern | 3 – 0 | Arminia Bielefeld |
| Hannover 96 | 2 – 0 | SC Fortuna Köln |

=== Quarter-finals ===
16 February 1974
| FC Bayern Munich | 3 – 2 | Hannover 96 |
| SG Wattenscheid 09 | 0 – 1 | Hamburger SV | (AET) |
| Eintracht Frankfurt | 4 – 3 | 1. FC Köln | (AET) |
23 February 1974
| Kickers Offenbach | 2 – 2 | 1. FC Kaiserslautern | (AET) |

==== Replay ====
6 March 1974
| 1. FC Kaiserslautern | 2 – 3 | Kickers Offenbach | (AET) |

=== Semi-finals ===
11 April 1974
| Eintracht Frankfurt | 3 – 2 | FC Bayern Munich |
13 April 1974
| Hamburger SV | 1 – 0 | Kickers Offenbach |

=== Final ===
17 August 1974
16:00 CET

| Hamburger SV | 1–3 (a.e.t.) | Eintracht Frankfurt |
|---|---|---|
| Bjørnmose 75' | Report | Trinklein 40'; Hölzenbein 95'; Kraus 115' |

Rheinstadion, Düsseldorf
Attendance: 52,800
Referee: Hans-Joachim Weyland (Oberhausen)
