= 1974–75 DFB-Pokal =

Tournament details
- Country: West Germany
- Teams: 128

Final positions
- Champions: Eintracht Frankfurt
- Runners-up: MSV Duisburg

Tournament statistics
- Matches played: 138

The 1974–75 DFB-Pokal was the 32nd season of the annual German football cup competition. The DFB-Pokal is considered the second-most important club title in German football after the Bundesliga championship. 128 teams competed in the tournament of seven rounds which began on 7 September 1974 and ended on 21 June 1975. In the final Eintracht Frankfurt defeated MSV Duisburg 1–0, thereby defending their title from the previous season. It was Frankfurt's second victory in the cup.

== Participating clubs ==
- The following teams qualified for the first round.

Bundesliga	Bundesliga 2 North; South	Amateur; North; Berlin; Westphalia; North Rhine	Amateur; Hesse; Southwest; Baden-Württemberg; Bavaria
FC Bayern Munich; Borussia Mönchengladbach; Fortuna Düsseldorf; Eintracht Frankfurt; 1. FC Köln; 1. FC Kaiserslautern; FC Schalke 04; Hertha BSC Berlin; VfB Stuttgart; Kickers Offenbach; SV Werder Bremen; Hamburger SV; Rot-Weiss Essen; VfL Bochum; Wuppertaler SV; MSV Duisburg; Eintracht Braunschweig; Tennis Borussia Berlin	North: SC Fortuna Köln Hannover 96 FC St. Pauli VfL Osnabrück VfL Wolfsburg HSV Barmbek-Uhlenhorst TSR Olympia Wilhelmshaven 1.SC Göttingen 05 SC Wacker 04 Berlin SG Wattenscheid 09 SC Rot-Weiß Oberhausen FC Bayer 05 Uerdingen; 1. FC Mülheim-Styrum SC Preußen Münster Borussia Dortmund TSV Alemannia Aachen ETB Schwarz-Weiß Essen DJK Gütersloh SpVgg Erkenschwick DSC Arminia Bielefeld; South: Borussia Neunkirchen; 1. FC Saarbrücken FC 08 Homburg / Saar SV Röchling Völklingen; 1. FSV Mainz 05 VfR Wormatia Worms FK Pirmasens FC Augsburg; 1. FC Nürnberg TSV 1860 Munich SV Darmstadt 98 SpVgg Bayreuth SV Stuttgarter Kickers SV Chio Waldhof Karlsruher SC FC Bayern Hof SpVgg Fürth VfR Heilbronn VfR Mannheim; 1. FC Schweinfurt 05	North: VfB Oldenburg SV Arminia Hannover OSV Hannover KSV Holstein Kiel TuS Bremerhaven 93 Heider SV VfB Lübeck VfR Neumünster FC Altona 93 Hamburger SV Amateure Blumenthaler SV SC Victoria Hamburg SC Sperber Hamburg SV Eintracht Nordhorn BSC Grünhöfe TuS Schwachhausen; 1. FC Wunstorf; Berlin: FC Hertha 03 Zehlendorf SC Westend 1901 SC Rapide Wedding Spandauer SV; Westphalia: Rot-Weiß Lüdenscheid Sportfreunde Siegen SC Westfalia Herne SC Herford TuS Ahlen; North Rhine: OSC Union Solingen SC Viktoria Köln SV Bayer 04 Leverkusen SC Jülich 1910 Rheydter SV TuS 08 Langerwehe Sportfreunde Hamborn 07 VfB Homberg	Hesse: SG Rot-Weiß Frankfurt TSV Klein-Linden TSV Ersen TSV Taunusstein-Bleidenstadt Usinger TSG; Southwest: SG Eintracht Bad Kreuznach I ASV Landau VfB Theley Sportfreunde Eisbachtal SV Eintracht Trier SC 07 Bad Neuenahr TuS Mayen ASC Dudweiler SV Leiwen VfB Dillingen SG Eintracht Bad Kreuznach II FV Eppelborn FC 1906 Rodalben; Baden-Württemberg: SV Sandhausen; 1. FC Pforzheim FV 09 Weinheim VfB Eppingen VfB Stuttgart Amateure SpVgg 07 Ludwigsburg; 1. Göppinger SV Heidenheimer SB FC 08 Villingen FC Emmendingen FV Baden-Oos FV Lörrach TV Gültstein; Bavaria: ASV Neumarkt FC Bayern Munich Amateure FC Wacker München TSV 1860 Weißenburg FSV Teutonia Obernau

== Matches ==
=== First round ===
7 September 1974
Eintracht Braunschweig	4–1	Hertha BSC	(AET)
FC Bayern Munich	3–2	VfB Stuttgart
SpVgg Bayreuth	1–2	FC Schalke 04
Arminia Bielefeld	1–3	Eintracht Frankfurt
Preußen Münster	0–4	Hamburger SV
SV Darmstadt 98	2–1	Wuppertaler SV Borussia
TV Gültstein	0–5	Borussia Mönchengladbach
Blumenthaler SV 1919	1–3	MSV Duisburg
Fortuna Düsseldorf	6–0	ASV 1860 Neumarkt
SC Herford	0–3	VfL Bochum
VfB Oldenburg	2–6	1. FC Köln
Rheydter Spv	1–2	Tennis Borussia Berlin
Göttingen 05	3–2	Hannover 96
Karlsruher SC	0–1	FC Bayern Hof
Schwarz-Weiß Essen	3–0	SG Wattenscheid 09
Alemannia Aachen	1–0	SpVgg Erkenschwick
Wacker 04 Berlin	0–1	1. FSV Mainz 05	(AET)
Borussia Dortmund	3–0	VfR Heilbronn
VfR Mannheim	8–0	SC Sperber Hamburg
FK Pirmasens	7–1	VfR Neumünster 1910
FV 09 Weinheim	2–4	Bayer Uerdingen	(AET)
FC 08 Homburg	3–0	TuS Schwachhausen
Viktoria Köln	4–0	Stuttgarter Kickers
SpVgg 07 Ludwigsburg	2–2	1. FC Mülheim	(AET)
SV Chio Waldhof	4–0	Heider SV 1925
VfB Eppingen	2–1	Röchling Völklingen
SF Hamborn 07	1–3	SC Fortuna Köln
Rot-Weiß Oberhausen	4–2	TuS 08 Langerwehe	(AET)
VfB Homberg	1–3	DJK Gütersloh
FV Lörrach	1–2	ASV Landau
Holstein Kiel	6–1	Rot-Weiß Frankfurt
FV Baden-Oos	1–3	Arminia Hannover
Rapide Wedding	3–0	TuS Mayen
TSV Klein-Linden	1–2	Rot-Weiß Lüdenscheid
Eintracht Bad Kreuznach Amateure	1–3	Bayer 04 Leverkusen
Heidenheimer SB	2–2	FC Hertha Zehlendorf	(AET)
TuS Ahlen	1–2	VfB Theley
TSV 1920 Ersen	0–1	VfB Dillingen	(AET)
SC Jülich 1910	2–1	SV Göppingen
ASC Dudweiler	2–1	FC Emmendingen
Victoria Hamburg	1–2	Altonaer FC 93	(AET)
VfB Lübeck	3–1	FC Bayern Munich II
Eintracht Bad Kreuznach	2–0	Westfalia Herne
8 September 1974
FC Schweinfurt 05	3–4	1. FC Kaiserslautern
SV Werder Bremen	11–1	BSC Grünhöfe
OSV Hannover	2–5	Rot-Weiß Essen
SG Union Solingen	2–1	Kickers Offenbach
VfL Osnabrück	0–2	Borussia Neunkirchen
FC Augsburg	2–1	1. FC Saarbrücken
TSV 1860 Munich	3–2	VfR Wormatia Worms	(AET)
SV Bremerhaven 1893	1–2	VfL Wolfsburg
FC St. Pauli	3–0	SC Bad Neuenahr
TSV 1860 Weißenburg	0–5	SpVgg Fürth
1. FC Nürnberg	2–2	Wacker München	(AET)
HSV Barmbek-Uhlenhorst	1–2	Sportfreunde Siegen	(AET)
Olympia Wilhelmshaven	4–1	Eintracht Trier
SV Leiwen-Köwerich	2–2	1. FC 1896 Pforzheim	(AET)
FV Eppelborn	4–2	Sportfreunde Eisbachtal
SV 1916 Sandhausen	3–1	1. FC Wunstorf
VfB Stuttgart II	8–4	FC 1908 Villingen	(AET)
Eintracht Nordhorn	5–1	Westend 01 Berlin
Usinger TSG	3–2	FSV Teutonia Obernau
Spandauer SV	2–0	Hamburger SV II
FC Rodalben	1–2	TSV Bleidenstadt	(AET)

==== Replays ====
22 September 1974
FC Hertha 03 Zehlendorf	5–0	Heidenheimer SB
28 September 1974
1. FC 1896 Pforzheim	0–0	SV Leiwen-Köwerich	(AET) (Pforzheim won 5–3 on penalties)
1 October 1974
Wacker München	2–5	1. FC Nürnberg
1. FC Mülheim	3–1	SpVgg 07 Ludwigsburg

=== Second round ===
25 October 1974
MSV Duisburg	3–0	1. FC Nürnberg
FC Bayern Munich	2–0	Rot-Weiß Oberhausen
FC Bayern Hof	2–2	VfL Bochum	(AET)
Fortuna Düsseldorf	4–1	FV Eppelborn
FC Schalke 04	6–0	FC Hertha 03 Zehlendorf
Tennis Borussia Berlin	4–0	Rapide Wedding
Rot-Weiß Lüdenscheid	3–5	Eintracht Braunschweig
VfB Eppingen	2–1	Hamburger SV
FC St. Pauli	8–3	1. FSV Mainz 05
1. FC Mülheim	2–0	VfR Mannheim
Schwarz-Weiß Essen	2–0	SV Darmstadt 98
Holstein Kiel	0–1	Bayer Uerdingen
ASV Landau	0–1	FC Augsburg
Viktoria Köln	6–1	Usinger TSG	(AET)
VfB Theley	2–4	Altonaer FC 93	(AET)
Bayer 04 Leverkusen	2–0	Eintracht Nordhorn
Arminia Hannover	5–0	ASC Dudweiler
VfB Dillingen	2–2	SC Jülich 1910	(AET)
VfB Stuttgart II	2–0	1. FC 1896 Pforzheim
26 October 1974
Rot-Weiß Essen	6–2	DJK Gütersloh
1. FC Kaiserslautern	7–1	Spandauer SV
SpVgg Fürth	1–1	Borussia Dortmund	(AET)
SV Chio Waldhof	0–1	SV 1916 Sandhausen
Eintracht Bad Kreuznach	2–4	TSV 1860 Munich
27 October 1974
VfL Wolfsburg	1–4	SV Werder Bremen
SG Union Solingen	1–2	Eintracht Frankfurt	(AET)
SC Fortuna Köln	7–2	Olympia Wilhelmshaven
TSV Bleidenstadt	0–0	FC 08 Homburg	(AET)
Sportfreunde Siegen	1–0	Göttingen 05
13 November 1974
Alemannia Aachen	2–1	Borussia Neunkirchen
21 December 1974
FK Pirmasens	6–0	VfB Lübeck
29 January 1975
Borussia Mönchengladbach	3–5	1. FC Köln

==== Replays ====
13 November 1974
Borussia Dortmund	1–0	SpVgg Fürth
TSV Bleidenstadt	0–0	FC 08 Homburg	(AET) (Bleidenstadt won 2–0 on penalties)
16 November 1974
SC Jülich 1910	4–0	VfB Dillingen
21 December 1974
VfL Bochum	5–0	FC Bayern Hof

=== Third round ===
8 February 1975
Fortuna Düsseldorf	3–2	1. FC Kaiserslautern	(AET)
FC Bayern Munich	2–3	MSV Duisburg
SC Fortuna Köln	2–0	FC Schalke 04
Bayer Uerdingen	0–2	VfL Bochum
SV Werder Bremen	2–2	FC Augsburg	(AET)
1. FC Köln	4–1	FC St. Pauli
1. FC Mülheim	0–3	Eintracht Frankfurt
Tennis Borussia Berlin	1–0	Alemannia Aachen
Schwarz-Weiß Essen	1–2	Rot-Weiß Essen
Eintracht Braunschweig	1–2	Viktoria Köln
FK Pirmasens	4–2	TSV 1860 Munich
Borussia Dortmund	2–1	Sportfreunde Siegen
VfB Stuttgart II	2–0	Bayer 04 Leverkusen
SC Jülich 1910	4–2	TSV Bleidenstadt
Altonaer FC 93	2–0	Arminia Hannover
15 February 1975
SV 1916 Sandhausen	1–2	VfB Eppingen

==== Replay ====
14 February 1975
FC Augsburg	1–2	SV Werder Bremen

=== Round of 16 ===
15 March 1975
Eintracht Frankfurt	1–0	VfL Bochum
Fortuna Düsseldorf	5–2	1. FC Köln
Rot-Weiß Essen	6–0	FK Pirmasens
MSV Duisburg	7–0	Altonaer FC 93
VfB Stuttgart II	2–1	Tennis Borussia Berlin
VfB Eppingen	0–2	SV Werder Bremen
SC Fortuna Köln	0–0	SC Jülich 1910	(AET)
Viktoria Köln	0–0	Borussia Dortmund	(AET)

==== Replays ====
24 March 1975
SC Jülich 1910	0–1	SC Fortuna Köln
26 March 1975
Borussia Dortmund	3–0	Viktoria Köln

=== Quarter-finals ===
12 April 1975
SV Werder Bremen	0–2	MSV Duisburg
Rot-Weiß Essen	1–0	Fortuna Düsseldorf
Eintracht Frankfurt	4–2	SC Fortuna Köln
VfB Stuttgart II	0–4	Borussia Dortmund

=== Semi-finals ===
29 April 1975
MSV Duisburg	2–1	Borussia Dortmund	(AET)
30 April 1975
Eintracht Frankfurt	3–1	Rot-Weiß Essen	(AET)

=== Final ===
21 June 1975
16:00 CET

Eintracht Frankfurt	1–0	MSV Duisburg
Körbel 57'	Report

Niedersachsenstadion, Hanover
Attendance: 43,000
Referee: Walter Horstmann (Nordstemmen)
