= 1976–77 1. FC Köln season =

1. FC Köln
1976–77 season
- Manager: Hennes Weisweiler
- Stadium: Müngersdorfer Stadion
- Bundesliga: 5th
- DFB-Pokal: Winners
- UEFA Cup: Third round
- Top goalscorer: League: Dieter Müller (34 goals); All: Dieter Müller (53 goals)

In the 1976–77 season, Köln ended their Bundesliga campaign in fifth place with 40 points. They also won the DFB-Pokal, beating Hertha BSC in a replay of the final after both clubs tied in the final. Having ended in fourth place in the last season's Bundesliga, Köln competed in the UEFA Cup, beating Tychy and Grasshoppers, and faced off against Queens Park Rangers in the third round. After losing 3-0 in Loftus Road, London, Köln beat the London club by 4-1 at home in Cologne, but due to the away goals rule, Queens Park Rangers advanced instead.

It was also the last season of club legend Wolfgang Overath as a professional player, having played for Köln since 1962. Striker Dieter Müller was the Bundesliga's top scorer, with 34 goals, and his additional goals in the DFB-Pokal and UEFA Cup led him to score 53 goals in total.

== Squad ==
Note: Flags indicate national team as defined under FIFA eligibility rules; some limited exceptions apply. Players may hold more than one non-FIFA nationality.

Pos.	Nation	Player
GK	GER	Toni Schumacher
GK	YUG	Slobodan Topalović
DF	GER	Roland Gerber
DF	GER	Gerd Strack
DF	GER	Wolfgang Weber
DF	GER	Bernd Cullmann
DF	GER	Herbert Zimmermann
DF	GER	Herbert Hein
DF	GER	Harald Konopka
MF	GER	Dieter Prestin

Pos.	Nation	Player
MF	GER	Heinz Flohe
MF	GER	Herbert Neumann
MF	GER	Rainer Nicot
MF	GER	Wolfgang Overath
MF	GER	Heinz Simmet
FW	GER	Hannes Löhr
FW	GER	Jürgen Glowacz
FW	BEL	Roger Van Gool
FW	DEN	Preben Elkjær Larsen
FW	GER	Klaus Kösling
FW	GER	Dieter Müller
FW	GER	Ferdinand Rohde

== Competitions ==
=== Bundesliga ===
==== League table ====
Pos	Team	Pld	W	D	L	GF	GA	GD	Pts	Qualification or relegation
3	Eintracht Braunschweig	34	15	13	6	56	38	+18	43	Qualification to UEFA Cup first round (Note: As 1. FC Köln qualified for the Cup Winners' Cup, their UEFA Cup spot was transferred to Bayern Munich.)
4	Eintracht Frankfurt	34	17	8	9	86	57	+29	42	Qualification to UEFA Cup first round
5	1. FC Köln	34	17	6	11	83	61	+22	40	Qualification to Cup Winners' Cup first round (Note: Hamburger SV won the 1976–77 European Cup Winners' Cup and thereby automatically qualified as defending champions.)
6	Hamburger SV	34	14	10	10	67	56	+11	38	Qualification to Cup Winners' Cup first round
7	Bayern Munich	34	14	9	11	74	65	+9	37	Qualification to UEFA Cup first round

Source: www.dfb.de
Rules for classification: 1) points; 2) goal difference; 3) number of goals scored.

===== Matches =====
14 August 1976 1	Köln	3-1	Kaiserslautern	Müngersdorfer Stadion, Cologne
15:30	Müller 39', 42'; Konopka 63'	Report	Melzer 47'	Attendance: 37,000; Referee: Rudolf Frickel

21 August 1976 2	Rot-Weiß Essen	0-3	Köln	Georg-Melches-Stadion, Essen
15:30		Report	van Gool 16'; Müller 75'; Zimmermann 83'	Attendance: 22,000; Referee: Heinz Quindeau

28 August 1976 3	Köln	2-0	Eintracht Frankfurt	Müngersdorfer Stadion, Cologne
15:30	van Gool 10'; Kösling 86'	Report		Attendance: 51,000; Referee: Günter Linn

4 September 1976 4	Fortuna Düsseldorf	1-3	Köln	Rheinstadion, Düsseldorf
15:30	Mattsson 65'	Report	Müller 42', 53'; Flohe 51'	Attendance: 35,000; Referee: Theo Antz

11 September 1976 5	Köln	3-0	Eintracht Braunschweig	Müngersdorfer Stadion, Cologne
15:30	Overath 60', 86'; Löhr 82'	Report		Attendance: 57,000; Referee: Heinz Aldinger

18 September 1976 6	Tennis Borussia Berlin	3-2	Köln	Olympiastadion, Berlin
15:30	Wendt 2'; Schulz 13'; Subklewe 55'	Report	Löhr 87'; Müller 90'	Attendance: 18.454; Referee: Herbert Lutz

25 September 1976 7	Bayern Munich	4-1	Köln	Olympiastadion, Munich
15:30	Rummenigge 9'; Hoeneß 41', 78'; Dürnberger 79'	Report	Overath 60'	Attendance: 77,850; Referee: Ferdinand Biwersi

2 October 1976 8	Köln	2-0	Schalke 04	Müngersdorfer Stadion, Cologne
15:30	Gerber 76'; Müller 88'	Report		Attendance: 55,500; Referee: Winfried Walz

9 October 1976 9	Hamburg	2-1	Köln	Volksparkstadion, Hamburg
15:30	Eigl 42'; Zimmermann 77' (o.g.)	Report	Müller 50'	Attendance: Rudolf Frickel; Referee: 58,000

23 October 1976 10	Köln	5-1	Saarbrücken	Müngersdorfer Stadion, Cologne
15:30	Löhr 5', 60' (pen.); Strack 50'; Müller 84'; Konopka 88'	Report	Traser 73' (pen.)	Attendance: 28,000; Referee: Walter Horstmann

30 October 1976 11	Karlsruhe	2-1	Köln	Wildparkstadion, Karlsruhe
15:30	Struth 49'; Janzon 85'	Report	Müller 13'	Attendance: 35,000; Referee: Walter Niemann

6 November 1976 12	Köln	0–3	Borussia Mönchengladbach	Müngersdorfer Stadion, Cologne
15:30		Report	Heynckes 43', 83'; Bonhof 74'	Attendance: 61,188; Referee: Jürgen Messmer

13 November 1976 13	Duisburg	1-1	Köln	Wedaustadion, Duisburg
15:30	Büssers 45'	Report	Elkjær 34'	Attendance: 27,000; Referee: Günter Linn

20 November 1976 14	Köln	3-2	Hertha BSC	Müngersdorfer Stadion, Cologne
15:30	Gerber 5'; Müller 15'; Flohe 55'	Report	Sidka 21'; Hermandung 88'	Attendance: 24,000; Referee: Ferdinand Biwersi

27 November 1976 15	Bochum	1-2	Köln	Ruhrstadion, Bochum
15:30	Fromm 44'	Report	Müller 63'; Flohe 73'	Attendance: 17,000; Referee: Hermann Schröder

3 December 1976 16	Köln	1-1	Borussia Dortmund	Müngersdorfer Stadion, Cologne
20:00	van Gool 57'	Report	Hartl 53'	Attendance: 40,000; Referee: Peter Gabor

11 December 1976 17	Werder Bremen	2-1	Köln	Weserstadion, Bremen
15:30	Røntved 52'; Röber 53'	Report	Müller 28'	Attendance: 23,000; Referee: Heinz Aldinger

15 January 1977 18	Kaiserslautern	4-2	Köln	Stadion Betzenberg, Kaiserslautern
15:30	Toppmöller 46', 69'; Riedl 48', 81'	Report	Scheller 37' (o.g.); Müller 42'	Attendance: 15,000; Referee: Horst Joos

22 January 1977 19	Köln	2-2	Rot-Weiß Essen	Müngersdorfer Stadion, Cologne
15:30	Müller 18'; Overath 74'	Report	Hrubesch 22'; Wieczorkowski 24'	Attendance: 15,000; Referee: Rainer Waltert

29 January 1977 20	Eintracht Frankfurt	4-0	Köln	Waldstadion, Frankfurt
15:30	Wenzel 40', 68', 69', 76'	Report		Attendance: 24,000; Referee: Eckhard Jensen

5 February 1977 21	Köln	2-2	Fortuna Düsseldorf	Müngersdorfer Stadion, Cologne
15:30	Löhr 8'; Müller 10'	Report	Szymanek 29'; Seel 88'	Attendance: 19,000; Referee: Herbert Lutz

12 February 1977 22	Eintracht Braunschweig	4-2	Köln	Eintracht-Stadion, Braunschweig
15:30	Holzer 10'; Frank 61', 77'; Hollmann 66'	Report	van Gool 23'; Glowacz 85'	Attendance: 22,000; Referee: Jürgen Walther

26 February 1977 23	Köln	8-4	Tennis Borussia Berlin	Müngersdorfer Stadion, Cologne
15:30	Müller 5', 8', 67', 85'; Simmet 20', 49'; Overath 25'; Flohe 85'	Report	Hochheimer 2'; Stradt 44'; Berkemeier] 68'; Subklewe 74'	Attendance: 14,000; Referee: Jürgen Meßmer

5 March 1977 24	Köln	3-0	Bayern Munich	Müngersdorfer Stadion, Cologne
15:30	van Gool 8', 17'; Beckenbauer 57' (o.g.)	Report		Attendance: 60,000; Referee: Walter Engel

12 March 1977 25	Schalke 04	1-1	Köln	Parkstadion, Gelsenkirchen
15:30	Abramczik 28'	Report	Zimmermann 21'	Attendance: 60,000; Referee: Rudolf Frickel

19 March 1977 26	Köln	3-3	Hamburger SV	Müngersdorfer Stadion, Cologne
15:30	Müller 10', 21', 33'	Report	Bertl 56'; Volkert 64'; Memering 76'	Attendance: 35,000; Referee: Max Klauser

26 March 1977 27	Saarbrücken	3-1	Köln	Ludwigsparkstadion, Saarbrücken
15:30	Stegmayer 45', 50', 67'	Report	Prestin 18'	Attendance: 25,000; Referee: Eberhard Schmoock

1 April 1977 28	Köln	4-0	Karlsruhe	Müngersdorfer Stadion, Cologne
20:00	Müller 1', 36', 73'; Gerber 14'	Report	Struth 70' (pen.)	Attendance: 8,000; Referee: Eckhard Jensen

12 April 1977 29	Borussia Mönchengladbach	3–1	Köln	Bökelbergstadion, Mönchengladbach
20:00	Bonhof 58'; Simonsen 70'; Kulik 77'		Flohe 75'	Attendance: 30,000; Referee: Klaus Ohmsen

16 April 1977 30	Köln	5-2	Duisburg	Müngersdorfer Stadion, Cologne
15:30	Löhr 28', 43'; Müller 37', 56' van Gool 87'	Report	Bücker 33'; Seliger 54'	Attendance: 19,000; Referee: Winfried Walz

23 April 1977 31	Hertha BSC	2-4	Köln	Olympiastadion, Berlin
15:30	Gersdorff 21'; Granitza 71'	Report	Müller 10', 77'; Strack 54' van Gool 65'	Attendance: 12,500; Referee: Volker Roth

6 May 1977 32	Köln	6-1	Bochum	Müngersdorfer Stadion, Cologne
20:00	Müller 15', 19', 42', 43'; Flohe 33'; Simmet 60'	Report	Kaczor 85'	Attendance: 12,000; Referee: Gert Meuser

13 May 1977 33	Borussia Dortmund	1-2	Köln	Parkstadion, Gelsenkirchen
20:00	Burgsmüller 18'	Report	Simmet 58' van Gool 89'	Attendance: 25,000; Referee: Werner Burgers

21 May 1977 34	Köln	3-0	Werder Bremen	Müngersdorfer Stadion, Cologne
15:30	Flohe 10'; Overath 29' van Gool 84'	Report		Attendance: 14,000; Referee: Max Klauser

=== DFB-Pokal ===
8 August 1976 First round	Itzehoer SV 1909	0-7	Köln
		Report	Müller 38', 48', 86'; Overath 45', 58'; Löhr 67'; Glowacz 85'	Attendance: 8,000; Referee: Wilfried Heitmann

16 October 1976 Second round	Fortuna Düsseldorf	2-4 (a.e.t.)	Köln	Rheinstadion, Düsseldorf
	Kriegler 31', 58'	Report	Müller 25', 105'; Löhr 43'; Flohe 93' (pen.)	Attendance: 27,000; Referee: Volker Roth

15 December 1976 Third round	Köln	5-1	Tennis Borussia Berlin	Müngersdorfer Stadion, Cologne
	Müller 3'; Flohe 17' (pen.) van Gool 34'; Löhr 60'; Neumann 81'	Report	Eggert 37'	Attendance: 10,000; Referee: Jan Redelfs

8 January 1977 Round of 16	Köln	7-2	Homburg	Müngersdorfer Stadion, Cologne
	Flohe 12', 18'; Müller 14', 37'; Overath 24', 32' van Gool 30'	Report	Bartel 63'; Lenz 88'	Attendance: 11,000; Referee: Diedrich Basedow

9 February 1977 Quarter-final	Köln	4-2	Nürnberg	Müngersdorfer Stadion, Cologne
	Müller 3', 48', 84'; Cullmann 57'	Report	Eder 22'; Petrović 87'	Attendance: 16,000; Referee: Volker Roth

7 April 1977 Semi-final	Köln	4-0	Rot-Weiß Essen	Müngersdorfer Stadion, Cologne
	Zimmermann 7'; Simmet 34'; Müller 44'; Prestin 67'	Report		Attendance: 30,000; Referee: Walter Horstmann

28 May 1977 Final	Köln	1-1	Hertha BSC	Niedersachsenstadion, Hanover
	Müller 41'	Report	Horr 64'	Attendance: 57,000; Referee: Rudolf Frickel

30 May 1977 Final replay	Köln	1-0	Hertha BSC	Niedersachsenstadion, Hanover
	Müller 70'	Report		Attendance: 35,000; Referee: Klaus Ohmsen

=== UEFA Cup ===
==== First round ====
15 September 1976 First leg	Köln (West Germany)	2–0	(Poland) Tychy	Müngersdorfer Stadion, Cologne
	Flohe 42' (pen.); Van Gool 88'	Report		Attendance: 19,000; Referee: Torben Månsson (Denmark)

29 September 1976 Second leg	Tychy (Poland)	1–1	(West Germany) Köln	Stadion Miejski, Tychy
	Ogaza 18'	Report	Müller 75'	Attendance: 15,000; Referee: Frans Derks (Netherlands)

==== Second round ====
20 October 1976 First leg	Köln (West Germany)	2–0	(Switzerland) Grasshoppers	Müngersdorfer Stadion, Cologne
	Konopka 37'; Müller 77'	Report		Attendance: 18,000; Referee: Malcolm Wright (Northern Ireland)

3 November 1976 Second leg	Grasshoppers (Switzerland)	2–3	(West Germany) Köln	Hardturm, Zürich
	Bauer 75' (pen.); Bosco 85'	Report	Müller 56'; Elkjær 58', 79'	Attendance: 12,500; Referee: Marijan Rauš (Yugoslavia)

==== Third round ====
24 November 1976 First leg	Queens Park Rangers (England)	3–0	(West Germany) Köln	Loftus Road, London
	Givens 39'; Webb 41'; Bowles 74'	Report		Attendance: 21,143; Referee: Paul Schiller (Austria)

8 December 1976 Second leg	Köln (West Germany)	4–1	(England) Queens Park Rangers	Müngersdorfer Stadion, Cologne
	Müller 22', 60'; Löhr 33'; Weber 36'	Report	Masson 4'	Attendance: 37,000; Referee: Pablo Sánchez Ibáñez (Spain)
