= 1977–78 1. FC Köln season =

1. FC Köln
1977-78 season
- Manager: Hennes Weisweiler
- Stadium: Müngersdorfer Stadion
- Bundesliga: 1st
- DFB-Pokal: Winners
- Cup Winners' Cup: First round
- Top goalscorer: League: Dieter Müller (24); All: Dieter Müller (33)

During the 1977-78 German football season, 1. FC Köln won the Bundesliga and the DFB-Pokal, completing a double. It was the club's 15th consecutive season in the Bundesliga.

== Squad ==
Note: Flags indicate national team as defined under FIFA eligibility rules; some limited exceptions apply. Players may hold more than one non-FIFA nationality.

Pos.	Nation	Player
GK	GER	Toni Schumacher
GK	GER	Gerry Ehrmann
GK	GER	Wolfgang Mattern
DF	GER	Roland Gerber
DF	GER	Gerd Strack
DF	GER	Wolfgang Weber
DF	GER	Bernd Cullmann
DF	GER	Holger Willmer
DF	GER	Herbert Zimmermann
DF	GER	Herbert Hein
DF	JPN	Yasuhiko Okudera
DF	GER	Harald Konopka
MF	GER	Dieter Prestin

Pos.	Nation	Player
MF	GER	Heinz Simmet
MF	GER	Heinz Pape
MF	GER	Norbert Schmitz
MF	GER	Herbert Neumann
MF	GER	Rainer Nicot
MF	GER	Heinz Flohe
FW	GER	Hannes Löhr
FW	GER	Jürgen Glowacz
FW	BEL	Roger Van Gool
FW	DEN	Preben Elkjær Larsen
FW	GER	Klaus Kösling
FW	GER	Dieter Müller

== Competitions ==
=== Bundesliga ===
==== League table ====
Pos	Team	Pld	W	D	L	GF	GA	GD	Pts	Qualification or relegation
1	1. FC Köln (C)	34	22	4	8	86	41	+45	48	Qualification to European Cup first round
2	Borussia Mönchengladbach	34	20	8	6	86	44	+42	48	Qualification to UEFA Cup first round (Note: As 1. FC Köln also won the DFB-Pokal, the Cup Winners' Cup spot was given to runners-up Fortuna Düsseldorf, while Düsseldorf's original UEFA Cup was transferred to MSV Duisburg.)
3	Hertha BSC	34	15	10	9	59	48	+11	40	Qualification to UEFA Cup first round
4	VfB Stuttgart	34	17	5	12	58	40	+18	39	Qualification to UEFA Cup first round
5	Fortuna Düsseldorf	34	15	9	10	49	36	+13	39	Qualification to Cup Winners' Cup first round

Source: www.dfb.de
Rules for classification: 1) points; 2) goal difference; 3) number of goals scored.
(C) Champions

==== Matches ====
Bundesliga match details
Round	Date	Opponent	Venue	Result F–A	Scorers	Attendance	Ref.
1	6 August 1977	Fortuna Düsseldorf	A	1–5	Willmer 2'	35,000	
2	13 August 1977	VfL Bochum	H	2–1	van Gool 28', 44'	18,000	
3	17 August 1977	Werder Bremen	H	7–2	D. Müller 12', 23', 32', 52', 73', 85'	19,000	
4	27 August 1977	Bayern Munich	A	3–0	Schwarzenbeck 5' o.g., D. Müller 57', Konopka 83'	50,000	
5	31 August 1977	Eintracht Braunschweig	H	6–0	H. Neumann 25', Simmet 31', Löhr 43', van Gool 60', 85', D. Müller 63'	50,000	
6	3 September 1977	1. FC Saarbrücken	A	0–1		34,000	
7	10 September 1977	FC Schalke 04	H	2–4	D. Müller 31', Flohe 90'	56,000	
8	17 September 1977	Hamburger SV	A	0–1		40,000	
9	24 September 1977	Borussia Dortmund	H	4–1	D. Müller 28', 67', van Gool 45', H. Zimmermann 58'	26,000	
10	1 October 1977	Borussia Mönchengladbach	A	5–2	Prestin 24', 55', H. Neumann 40', Konopka 64', D. Müller 83'	32,000	
11	12 October 1977	Hertha BSC	H	3–1			
12	22 October 1977	MSV Duisburg	A	2–1			
13	29 October 1977	1860 Munich	H	6–2			
14	5 November 1977	Eintracht Frankfurt	A	2–2			
15	12 November 1977	1. FC Kaiserslautern	H	4–1			
16	26 November 1977	VfB Stuttgart	A	0–3			
17	3 December 1977	FC St. Pauli	H	4–1			
18	10 December 1977	Fortuna Düsseldorf	H	1–0			
19	17 December 1977	VfL Bochum	A	0–0			
20	7 January 1978	Werder Bremen	A	2–0			
21	14 January 1978	Bayern Munich	H	2–0			
22	21 January 1978	Eintracht Braunschweig	A	0–1			
23	28 January 1978	1. FC Saarbrücken	H	3–1			
24	4 February 1978	FC Schalke 04	A	0–2			
25	11 February 1978	Hamburger SV	H	6–1			
26	18 February 1978	Borussia Dortmund	A	2–1			
27	25 February 1978	Borussia Mönchengladbach	H	1–1			
28	4 March 1978	Hertha BSC	A	1–1			
29	11 March 1978	MSV Duisburg	H	5–2			
30	18 March 1978	1860 Munich	A	3–1			
31	1 April 1978	Eintracht Frankfurt	H	0–1			
32	8 April 1978	1. FC Kaiserslautern	A	2–0			
33	22 April 1978	VfB Stuttgart	H	2–1	Flohe 18', Okudera 80'	60,000	
34	29 April 1978	FC St. Pauli	A	5–0	Flohe 28', 69', Okudera 60', 86', B. Cullmann 83'	25,000	
