= 1973 DFB-Pokal final =

- Match programme cover
- Event: 1972–73 DFB-Pokal
Borussia Mönchengladbach	1. FC Köln
2	1
- After extra time
- Date: 23 June 1973
- Venue: Rheinstadion, Düsseldorf
- Referee: Kurt Tschenscher (Mannheim)
- Attendance: 69,600

The 1973 DFB-Pokal final, which decided the winner of the 1972–73 DFB-Pokal, took place on 23 June 1973 between Borussia Mönchengladbach and 1. FC Köln in the Rheinstadion in Düsseldorf. The sports magazine kicker described it as one of the "best, highest energy, and exciting" DFB-Pokal matches ever played. It was in this match that Günter Netzer famously substituted himself on. Shortly after this, Netzer scored what would be the winning goal for Borussia.

As winners, Mönchengladbach qualified for the 1973–74 European Cup Winners' Cup.

== Background ==
Gladbach coach Hennes Weisweiler in nine years had raised Gladbach from the second tier of German football to top European football. A large contribution to this success was due to Günter Netzer, who Weisweiler shared a love-hate relationship. However, in the 1972–73 season, Netzer was plagued with weaknesses and injuries, and Borussia finished a somewhat disappointing fifth place in the Bundesliga. Shortly before the match, news broke that Netzer would transfer to Real Madrid in the summer, making the match his farewell for Borussia. The day before the final, Weisweiler announced that Netzer would not be in the starting lineup, as Weisweiler was already planning for Netzer's absence. To Weisweiler, Netzer replied, "that's brave of you". At the same time Netzer had to admit internally that the decision was justified due to concerns over his fitness. For his replacement, Weisweiler brought on Herbert Wimmer as central midfielder and team captain.

1. FC Köln had made the cup final thrice in the previous five seasons, winning once, and went into the match as a slight favourites.

== Route to the final ==
The DFB-Pokal began with 32 teams in a two-legged knockout cup competition. There were a total of four rounds leading up to the final. Teams were drawn against each other, and following two legs of 90 minutes each, the winner on aggregate would advance. If still tied, 30 minutes of extra time was played. If the score was still level, a penalty shoot-out was used to determine the winner.

Note: In all results below, the score of the finalist is given first (H: home; A: away).

Borussia Mönchengladbach				Round	1. FC Köln			
Opponent	Agg.	1st leg	2nd leg	1972–73 DFB-Pokal	Opponent	Agg.	1st leg	2nd leg
Freiburger FC	8–4	1–3 (A)	7–1 (H)	Round 1	Fortuna Köln	5–2	1–2 (A)	4–0 (a.e.t.) (H)
Schalke 04	3–1	2–0 (A)	1–1 (H)	Round of 16	Hamburger SV	6–3	2–2 (A)	4–1 (H)
1. FC Kaiserslautern	5–2	2–1 (H)	3–1 (A)	Quarter-finals	Eintracht Braunschweig	8–2	5–0 (A)	3–2 (H)
Werder Bremen	7–3	3–1 (A)	4–2 (H)	Semi-finals	Kickers Offenbach	6–1	5–0 (H)	1–1 (A)

== Match ==
=== Summary ===
Gladbach went ahead 24 minutes in via a goal by Herbert Wimmer, but just before the break, the Köln found an equaliser through Herbert Neumann. Netzer was on the bench, but the Borussia fans demanded he be substituted on. Cameras were trained on him, watching his every movement. During the entire first half, spectators at the Rheinstadion demanded to see Netzer subbed in. At half-time Weisweiler wanted to substitute Netzer on, but he rejected this, saying, "better that it not be me".

In the 58th minute, Gladbach attacker Jupp Heynckes was fouled by Jupp Kapellmann inside the box, and referee Kurt Tschenscher awarded a penalty. Contrary to the old football rule, Heynckes himself took the penalty, and saw it saved by Köln goalkeeper Gerhard Welz. Protests that Welz had moved too early were dismissed by the referee. Further into the second half, Köln twice hit the crossbar via Jürgen Glowacz in the 67th minute and Heinz Flohe in the 81st minute. In the 86th minute, a shot by Gladbach's Heynckes also hit the woodwork. However, at the end of 90 minutes the score remained level at 1–1, and extra time was required.

As the game went to extra time, Netzer spoke to the exhausted Christian Kulik, asking whether he still felt fit. Upon Kulik expressing doubt, Netzer took off his training jacket, went to Weisweiler, and informed him that he would be substituting himself in for Kulik, saying "I'll play now then".

In the 94th minute, minutes after his substitution, Netzer scored what would be the winning goal with his second touch of the match following a wall pass with teammate Rainer Bonhof. Netzer later admitted that he took the ball "completely wrong" with the outer instep, thereby out of reach of the keeper Welz. He called it "the luckiest moment of my football career", because it was "meant" to go awry. His winning goal was later voted Goal of the Month for June 1973 and Goal of the Year for 1973.

=== Details ===
23 June 1973
16:00 CET

Borussia Mönchengladbach	2–1 (a.e.t.)	1. FC Köln
Wimmer 24'; Netzer 94'	Report	Neumann 40'

Rheinstadion, Düsseldorf
Attendance: 69,600
Referee: Kurt Tschenscher (Mannheim)

Borussia Mönchengladbach	1. FC Köln

GK	1	(West Germany) Wolfgang Kleff
RB	5	(West Germany) Rainer Bonhof
CB	3	(West Germany) Berti Vogts
CB	4	(West Germany) Klaus-Dieter Sieloff
LB	2	(West Germany) Heinz Michallik
CM	6	(West Germany) Dietmar Danner
CM	10	(West Germany) Christian Kulik		(substituted off) 91'
CM	8	(West Germany) Herbert Wimmer (c)
RW	7	(Denmark) Henning Jensen
CF	9	(West Germany) Bernd Rupp		(substituted off) 117'
LW	11	(West Germany) Jupp Heynckes	Yellow card
Substitutes:
MF	12	(West Germany) Günter Netzer		(substituted on) 91'
MF	14	(West Germany) Uli Stielike		(substituted on) 117'
Manager:
(West Germany) Hennes Weisweiler

GK	1	(West Germany) Gerhard Welz
RB	9	(West Germany) Jupp Kapellmann
CB	4	(West Germany) Wolfgang Weber
CB	5	(West Germany) Bernhard Cullmann
LB	2	(West Germany) Herbert Hein
RM	8	(West Germany) Heinz Flohe
CM	6	(West Germany) Heinz Simmet
CM	3	(West Germany) Herbert Neumann
LM	10	(West Germany) Wolfgang Overath (c)		(substituted off) 71'
CF	7	(West Germany) Jürgen Glowacz	Yellow card	(substituted off) 71'
CF	11	(West Germany) Hannes Löhr
Substitutes:
DF	12	(West Germany) Harald Konopka		(substituted on) 71'
FW	15	(West Germany) Rainer Gebauer		(substituted on) 71'
Manager:
(West Germany) Rudi Schlott

Match rules

- 90 minutes.
- 30 minutes of extra time if necessary.
- Replay if scores still level.
- Maximum of two substitutions.

== Impact ==
Netzer's goal was chosen as goal of the month, and he was named German footballer of the year for a second consecutive year. Netzer moved to Real Madrid, playing for them until 1976, where he twice won the Spanish cup and league.

Weisweiler compensated with the loss of Netzer with young players as Borussia went on to win the Bundesliga and the UEFA Cup in 1975.

1. FC Köln did not win a second DFB-Pokal title until 1977, after Weisweiler had taken over there as coach.
