= Rhine derby =

Name for any match between 1. FC Köln and Borussia Mönchengladbach

- 1. FC Köln; Borussia Mönchengladbach
- Other names: Weisweiler derby
- Location: North Rhine-Westphalia
- First meeting: FC Köln 6–2 München-Gladbach (10 September 1950); 1950–51 Oberliga West
- Latest meeting: 1 FC Köln 2–1 Mönchengladbach (11 October 2026); 2026–27 Bundesliga
- Stadiums: RheinEnergieStadion (1. FC Köln); Borussia-Park (Mönchengladbach)

Statistics
- Total meetings: 133
- Most wins: Mönchengladbach (61)
- Most player appearances: Berti Vogts (32)
- Top scorer: Hans Schäfer (14)

The Rhine derby (German: Rheinisches Derby) is an association football derby between German clubs 1. FC Köln and Borussia Mönchengladbach, first contested in 1950. FC Köln play at the RheinEnergieStadion in Cologne, while Borussia Mönchengladbach play at the Borussia-Park in Mönchengladbach; the two grounds are separated by approximately 34 miles (55 km).

The teams have played 133 matches in all competitions, Borussia Mönchengladbach winning 61, 1.FC Köln winning 48 and the remaining 24 matches were drawn.

== History ==
The derby takes its name from the historical region of Rhineland, due to river Rhine. The name Rhine derby is applied to matches between the clubs from the cities which the river Rhine runs through, which also includes Fortuna Düsseldorf and Bayer 04 Leverkusen. Mönchengladbach is the only city without river Rhine, but the term Rhine derby is mostly used for matches between FC Köln and Borussia Mönchengladbach, the fixture is often referred to as Weisweiler derby, after Hennes Weisweiler, who played for both the clubs. The first meeting between the teams came in 1950–51 Oberliga West, when FC Köln hosted Borussia VfL München-Gladbach (now Borussia Mönchengladbach), the match ended in 6–2 win for FC Köln.

In 1972–73 DFB-Pokal, the two teams met in the finals in the Rheinstadion, Düsseldorf. Borussia Mönchengladbach won the match 2–1 in extra-time.

The teams face-off twice in UEFA Cup, first in the Round of 16 of 1972–73 UEFA Cup; Borussia Mönchengladbach won 5–0 on aggregate after winning the second leg 5–0. The second derby in European competition was in the semi-finals of 1974–75 UEFA Cup, which was also won by Borussia Mönchengladbach, who won 4–1 on aggregate and went on to win the finals. Borussia Mönchengladbach ended their season with league and European double.

On 8 March 2024, Mönchengladbach police arrested 205 fans for violent clashes outside the stadium as Mönchengladbach fans were preparing for the choreography for the upcoming derby. 131 Köln and 74 Mönchengladbach fans were arrested by the police.

== Head-to-head ==
=== Statistics ===
As of 11 October 2026

Competition	Played	1. FC Köln wins	Draws	Mönchengladbach wins	1. FC Köln goals	Mönchengladbach goals
Bundesliga	101	29	19	53	140	199
2. Bundesliga	4	0	3	1	5	7
Oberliga West	22	17	2	3	72	24
DFB-Pokal	3	2	0	1	9	7
Europa League	4	0	1	3	1	9
Total	134	48	25	61	227	246

=== List of matches ===
League

#	Season	Date	Competition	Home Team	Result	Away Team	Stadium	Attendance	H2H
1	1950–51	10 September 1950	Oberliga West	1. FC Köln	6–2	München-Gladbach	Müngersdorfer Stadion	11,000	+1
2	1950–51	21 January 1951	Oberliga West	München-Gladbach	1–3	1. FC Köln	Grenzlandstadion	12,000	+2
3	1952–53	12 October 1952	Oberliga West	München-Gladbach	0–6	1. FC Köln	Grenzlandstadion	19,000	+3
4	1952–53	22 February 1953	Oberliga West	1. FC Köln	6–0	München-Gladbach	Müngersdorfer Stadion	10,000	+4
5	1953–54	13 September 1953	Oberliga West	1. FC Köln	3–0	München-Gladbach	Müngersdorfer Stadion	10,000	+5
6	1953–54	17 January 1954	Oberliga West	München-Gladbach	0–3	1. FC Köln	Grenzlandstadion	26,000	+6
7	1954–55	12 December 1954	Oberliga West	1. FC Köln	5–1	München-Gladbach	Müngersdorfer Stadion	7,000	+7
8	1954–55	24 April 1955	Oberliga West	München-Gladbach	3–2	1. FC Köln	Grenzlandstadion	25,000	+6
9	1955–56	19 November 1955	Oberliga West	1. FC Köln	1–0	München-Gladbach	Müngersdorfer Stadion	5,000	+7
10	1955–56	2 April 1956	Oberliga West	München-Gladbach	3–2	1. FC Köln	Grenzlandstadion	23,000	+6
11	1956–57	14 October 1956	Oberliga West	München-Gladbach	0–3	1. FC Köln	Grenzlandstadion	10,000	+7
12	1956–57	13 April 1957	Oberliga West	1. FC Köln	5–2	München-Gladbach	Müngersdorfer Stadion	5,000	+8
13	1958–59	17 August 1958	Oberliga West	1. FC Köln	2–2	München-Gladbach	Müngersdorfer Stadion	12,000	+8
14	1958–59	4 January 1959	Oberliga West	München-Gladbach	0–0	1. FC Köln	Grenzlandstadion	13,000	+8
15	1959–60	29 August 1959	Oberliga West	1. FC Köln	3–1	München-Gladbach	Müngersdorfer Stadion	19,000	+9
16	1959–60	28 February 1960	Oberliga West	München-Gladbach	1–2	1. FC Köln	Grenzlandstadion	33,000	+10
17	1960–61	1 January 1961	Oberliga West	1. FC Köln	4–1	Mönchengladbach	Müngersdorfer Stadion	11,000	+11
18	1960–61	30 April 1961	Oberliga West	Mönchengladbach	2–3	1. FC Köln	Grenzlandstadion	35,000	+12
19	1961–62	29 October 1961	Oberliga West	Mönchengladbach	1–6	1. FC Köln	Grenzlandstadion	28,000	+13
20	1961–62	10 March 1962	Oberliga West	1. FC Köln	3–0	Mönchengladbach	Müngersdorfer Stadion	18,000	+14
21	1962–63	28 October 1962	Oberliga West	1. FC Köln	2–0	Mönchengladbach	Müngersdorfer Stadion	6,000	+15
22	1962–63	10 March 1963	Oberliga West	Mönchengladbach	4–2	1. FC Köln	Grenzlandstadion	12,000	+14
23	1965–66	20 November 1965	Bundesliga	Mönchengladbach	2–3	1. FC Köln	Bökelbergstadion	35,000	+15
24	1965–66	23 April 1966	Bundesliga	1. FC Köln	2–2	Mönchengladbach	Müngersdorfer Stadion	17,000	+15
25	1966–67	26 November 1966	Bundesliga	1. FC Köln	1–2	Mönchengladbach	Müngersdorfer Stadion	23,000	+14
26	1966–67	13 May 1967	Bundesliga	Mönchengladbach	3–0	1. FC Köln	Bökelbergstadion	20,000	+13
27	1967–68	25 November 1967	Bundesliga	1. FC Köln	2–5	Mönchengladbach	Müngersdorfer Stadion	39,000	+12
28	1967–68	11 May 1968	Bundesliga	Mönchengladbach	1–0	1. FC Köln	Bökelbergstadion	16,000	+11
29	1968–69	24 August 1968	Bundesliga	Mönchengladbach	2–1	1. FC Köln	Bökelbergstadion	32,000	+10
30	1968–69	18 January 1969	Bundesliga	1. FC Köln	1–4	Mönchengladbach	Müngersdorfer Stadion	35,000	+9
31	1969–70	29 November 1969	Bundesliga	1. FC Köln	0–1	Mönchengladbach	Müngersdorfer Stadion	54,000	+8
32	1969–70	11 April 1970	Bundesliga	Mönchengladbach	2–0	1. FC Köln	Bökelbergstadion	32,000	+7
33	1970–71	3 October 1970	Bundesliga	Mönchengladbach	1–1	1. FC Köln	Bökelbergstadion	22,000	+7
34	1970–71	27 March 1971	Bundesliga	1. FC Köln	3–2	Mönchengladbach	Müngersdorfer Stadion	45,000	+8
35	1971–72	2 October 1971	Bundesliga	1. FC Köln	4–3	Mönchengladbach	Müngersdorfer Stadion	25,000	+9
36	1971–72	25 March 1972	Bundesliga	Mönchengladbach	3–0	1. FC Köln	Bökelbergstadion	21,000	+8
37	1972–73	2 December 1971	Bundesliga	Mönchengladbach	5–2	1. FC Köln	Bökelbergstadion	18,000	+7
38	1972–73	2 June 1973	Bundesliga	1. FC Köln	3–1	Mönchengladbach	Müngersdorfer Stadion	15,000	+8
39	1973–74	29 September 1973	Bundesliga	Mönchengladbach	1–1	1. FC Köln	Bökelbergstadion	27,500	+8
40	1973–74	16 March 1974	Bundesliga	1. FC Köln	0–1	Mönchengladbach	Müngersdorfer Stadion	28,000	+7
41	1974–75	16 November 1974	Bundesliga	Mönchengladbach	1–1	1. FC Köln	Bökelbergstadion	20,000	+7
42	1974–75	10 May 1975	Bundesliga	1. FC Köln	1–2	Mönchengladbach	Müngersdorfer Stadion	28,000	+6
43	1975–76	6 December 1975	Bundesliga	1. FC Köln	0–4	Mönchengladbach	Müngersdorfer Stadion	61,000	+5
44	1975–76	12 June 1976	Bundesliga	Mönchengladbach	2–1	1. FC Köln	Bökelbergstadion	34,000	+4
45	1976–77	6 November 1976	Bundesliga	1. FC Köln	0–3	Mönchengladbach	Müngersdorfer Stadion	61,200	+3
46	1976–77	12 April 1977	Bundesliga	Mönchengladbach	3–1	1. FC Köln	Bökelbergstadion	30,000	+2
47	1977–78	1 September 1977	Bundesliga	Mönchengladbach	2–5	1. FC Köln	Bökelbergstadion	32,000	+3
48	1977–78	25 February 1978	Bundesliga	1. FC Köln	1–1	Mönchengladbach	Müngersdorfer Stadion	60,000	+3
49	1979–80	20 October 1979	Bundesliga	1. FC Köln	4–4	Mönchengladbach	Müngersdorfer Stadion	33,000	+2
50	1979–80	22 March 1980	Bundesliga	Mönchengladbach	2–2	1. FC Köln	Bökelbergstadion	28,100	+2
51	1980–81	31 October 1980	Bundesliga	Mönchengladbach	2–0	1. FC Köln	Bökelbergstadion	27,800	+1
52	1980–81	18 April 1981	Bundesliga	1. FC Köln	2–3	Mönchengladbach	Müngersdorfer Stadion	30,000	0
53	1981–82	26 September 1981	Bundesliga	1. FC Köln	3–0	Mönchengladbach	Müngersdorfer Stadion	46,000	+1
54	1981–82	13 March 1982	Bundesliga	Mönchengladbach	0–2	1. FC Köln	Bökelbergstadion	35,484	+2
55	1982–83	27 November 1982	Bundesliga	Mönchengladbach	1–4	1. FC Köln	Bökelbergstadion	25,000	+3
56	1982–83	20 May 1983	Bundesliga	1. FC Köln	3–1	Mönchengladbach	Müngersdorfer Stadion	16,600	+4
57	1983–84	24 September 1983	Bundesliga	Mönchengladbach	4–2	1. FC Köln	Bökelbergstadion	30,600	+3
58	1983–84	17 March 1984	Bundesliga	1. FC Köln	1–2	Mönchengladbach	Müngersdorfer Stadion	41,000	+2
59	1984–85	13 November 1984	Bundesliga	1. FC Köln	1–5	Mönchengladbach	Müngersdorfer Stadion	43,000	+1
60	1984–85	11 May 1985	Bundesliga	Mönchengladbach	2–3	1. FC Köln	Bökelbergstadion	26,000	+2
61	1985–86	7 September 1985	Bundesliga	Mönchengladbach	1–1	1. FC Köln	Bökelbergstadion	24,500	+2
62	1985–86	8 April 1986	Bundesliga	1. FC Köln	0–2	Mönchengladbach	Müngersdorfer Stadion	18,000	+1
63	1986–87	26 November 1986	Bundesliga	Mönchengladbach	3–1	1. FC Köln	Bökelbergstadion	31,000	0
64	1986–87	13 June 1987	Bundesliga	1. FC Köln	2–4	Mönchengladbach	Müngersdorfer Stadion	30,000	+1
65	1987–88	10 October 1987	Bundesliga	1. FC Köln	4–1	Mönchengladbach	Müngersdorfer Stadion	59,000	+1
66	1987–88	23 April 1988	Bundesliga	Mönchengladbach	0–1	1. FC Köln	Bökelbergstadion	26,000	+2
67	1988–89	8 October 1988	Bundesliga	Mönchengladbach	1–0	1. FC Köln	Bökelbergstadion	18,000	+1
68	1988–89	29 April 1989	Bundesliga	1. FC Köln	3–1	Mönchengladbach	Müngersdorfer Stadion	40,000	+2
69	1989–90	30 September 1989	Bundesliga	Mönchengladbach	0–2	1. FC Köln	Bökelbergstadion	29,000	+3
70	1989–90	7 April 1990	Bundesliga	1. FC Köln	3–0	Mönchengladbach	Müngersdorfer Stadion	30,000	+4
71	1990–91	1 September 1990	Bundesliga	Mönchengladbach	2–2	1. FC Köln	Bökelbergstadion	18,500	+4
72	1990–91	16 March 1991	Bundesliga	1. FC Köln	1–3	Mönchengladbach	Müngersdorfer Stadion	28,000	+3
73	1991–92	20 September 1991	Bundesliga	Mönchengladbach	2–2	1. FC Köln	Bökelbergstadion	29,000	+3
74	1991–92	21 March 1992	Bundesliga	1. FC Köln	1–1	Mönchengladbach	Müngersdorfer Stadion	24,000	+3
75	1992–93	26 September 1992	Bundesliga	Mönchengladbach	1–2	1. FC Köln	Bökelbergstadion	32,000	+4
76	1992–93	10 April 1993	Bundesliga	1. FC Köln	1–2	Mönchengladbach	Müngersdorfer Stadion	55,000	+3
77	1993–94	13 November 1993	Bundesliga	1. FC Köln	0–4	Mönchengladbach	Müngersdorfer Stadion	48,000	+2
78	1993–94	30 April 1994	Bundesliga	Mönchengladbach	4–1	1. FC Köln	Bökelbergstadion	32,500	+1
79	1994–95	5 November 1994	Bundesliga	1. FC Köln	1–3	Mönchengladbach	Müngersdorfer Stadion	53,000	0
80	1994–95	6 May 1995	Bundesliga	Mönchengladbach	0–0	1. FC Köln	Bökelbergstadion	34,500	0
81	1995–96	27 October 1995	Bundesliga	1. FC Köln	0–2	Mönchengladbach	Müngersdorfer Stadion	51,000	+1
82	1995–96	13 April 1996	Bundesliga	Mönchengladbach	2–1	1. FC Köln	Bökelbergstadion	34,500	+2
83	1996–97	14 September 1996	Bundesliga	1. FC Köln	4–0	Mönchengladbach	Müngersdorfer Stadion	43,000	+1
84	1996–97	15 March 1997	Bundesliga	Mönchengladbach	2–1	1. FC Köln	Bökelbergstadion	34,200	+2
85	1997–98	23 August 1997	Bundesliga	Mönchengladbach	4–1	1. FC Köln	Bökelbergstadion	30,500	+3
86	1997–98	31 January 1998	Bundesliga	1. FC Köln	3–2	Mönchengladbach	Müngersdorfer Stadion	42,000	+2
87	1999–2000	27 September 1999	2. Bundesliga	Mönchengladbach	3–1	1. FC Köln	Bökelbergstadion	30,100	+3
88	1999–2000	20 March 2000	2. Bundesliga	1. FC Köln	1–1	Mönchengladbach	Müngersdorfer Stadion	42,500	+3
89	2001–02	19 August 2001	Bundesliga	1. FC Köln	0–2	Mönchengladbach	Müngersdorfer Stadion	42,000	+4
90	2001–02	20 March 2000	Bundesliga	Mönchengladbach	3–1	1. FC Köln	Bökelbergstadion	42,500	+5
91	2003–04	3 August 2003	Bundesliga	Mönchengladbach	1–0	1. FC Köln	Bökelbergstadion	34,500	+6
92	2003–04	31 January 2003	Bundesliga	1. FC Köln	1–0	Mönchengladbach	RheinEnergieStadion	50,997	+5
93	2005–06	17 September 2005	Bundesliga	1. FC Köln	2–1	Mönchengladbach	RheinEnergieStadion	50,400	+4
94	2005–06	18 February 2006	Bundesliga	Mönchengladbach	2–0	1. FC Köln	Borussia-Park	54,019	+5
95	2007–08	22 October 2007	2. Bundesliga	Mönchengladbach	2–2	1. FC Köln	Borussia-Park	54,067	+5
96	2007–08	7 April 2008	2. Bundesliga	1. FC Köln	1–1	Mönchengladbach	RheinEnergieStadion	50,374	+5
97	2008–09	4 October 2008	Bundesliga	Mönchengladbach	1–2	1. FC Köln	Borussia-Park	54,067	+4
98	2008–09	14 March 2009	Bundesliga	1. FC Köln	2–4	Mönchengladbach	RheinEnergieStadion	50,067	+5
99	2009–10	24 October 2009	Bundesliga	Mönchengladbach	0–0	1. FC Köln	Borussia-Park	54,067	+5
100	2009–10	19 March 2010	Bundesliga	1. FC Köln	1–1	Mönchengladbach	RheinEnergieStadion	50,000	+5
101	2010–11	13 November 2010	Bundesliga	1. FC Köln	0–4	Mönchengladbach	RheinEnergieStadion	50,000	+6
102	2010–11	10 April 2011	Bundesliga	Mönchengladbach	5–1	1. FC Köln	Borussia-Park	53,104	+7
103	2011–12	25 November 2011	Bundesliga	1. FC Köln	0–3	Mönchengladbach	RheinEnergieStadion	50,000	+8
104	2011–12	15 April 2012	Bundesliga	Mönchengladbach	3–0	1. FC Köln	Borussia-Park	52,990	+9
105	2014–15	21 September 2014	Bundesliga	1. FC Köln	0–0	Mönchengladbach	RheinEnergieStadion	50,000	+9
106	2014–15	14 February 2015	Bundesliga	Mönchengladbach	1–0	1. FC Köln	Borussia-Park	54,010	+10
107	2015–16	19 September 2015	Bundesliga	1. FC Köln	1–0	Mönchengladbach	RheinEnergieStadion	47,800	+9
108	2015–16	20 February 2016	Bundesliga	Mönchengladbach	1–0	1. FC Köln	Borussia-Park	52,226	+10
107	2016–17	19 November 2016	Bundesliga	Mönchengladbach	1–2	1. FC Köln	Borussia-Park	53,757	+9
108	2016–17	8 April 2017	Bundesliga	1. FC Köln	2–3	Mönchengladbach	RheinEnergieStadion	50,000	+10
109	2017–18	20 August 2017	Bundesliga	Mönchengladbach	1–0	1. FC Köln	Borussia-Park	54,018	+11
110	2017–18	14 January 2018	Bundesliga	1. FC Köln	2–1	Mönchengladbach	RheinEnergieStadion	50,000	+10
111	2019–20	14 September 2019	Bundesliga	1. FC Köln	0–1	Mönchengladbach	RheinEnergieStadion	50,000	+11
112	2019–20	11 March 2020	Bundesliga	Mönchengladbach	2–1	1. FC Köln	Borussia-Park	0 (Note: Played behind closed doors due to COVID-19 pandemic.)	+12
113	2020–21	3 October 2020	Bundesliga	1. FC Köln	1–3	Mönchengladbach	RheinEnergieStadion	300	+13
114	2020–21	6 February 2021	Bundesliga	Mönchengladbach	1–2	1. FC Köln	Borussia-Park	0 (Note: Played behind closed doors due to COVID-19 pandemic.)	+12
115	2021–22	27 November 2021	Bundesliga	1. FC Köln	4–1	Mönchengladbach	RheinEnergieStadion	50,000	+11
116	2021–22	16 April 2022	Bundesliga	Mönchengladbach	1–3	1. FC Köln	Borussia-Park	54,042	+10
117	2022–23	9 October 2022	Bundesliga	Mönchengladbach	5–2	1. FC Köln	Borussia-Park	54,042	+11
118	2022–23	2 April 2023	Bundesliga	1. FC Köln	0–0	Mönchengladbach	RheinEnergieStadion	50,000	+11
119	2023–24	22 October 2023	Bundesliga	1. FC Köln	3–1	Mönchengladbach	RheinEnergieStadion	50,000	+10
120	2023–24	9 March 2024	Bundesliga	Mönchengladbach	3–3	1. FC Köln	Borussia-Park	54,042	+10
121	2025–26	8 November 2025	Bundesliga	Mönchengladbach	3–1	1. FC Köln	Borussia-Park	54,042	+11
122	2025–26	21 March 2026	Bundesliga	1. FC Köln	3–3	Mönchengladbach	RheinEnergieStadion	50,000	+11
123	2026–27	11 October 2026	Bundesliga	1. FC Köln	2–1	Mönchengladbach	RheinEnergieStadion	50,000	+11

Cup

#	Season	Date	Competition	Round	Home Team	Result	Away Team	Stadium	Attendance
1	1969–70	5 August 1970	DFB-Pokal	Quarter-finals	Mönchengladbach	2–3 (Note: After extra-time.)	1. FC Köln	Bökelbergstadion	32,000
2	1972–73	23 June 1973	DFB-Pokal	Final	Mönchengladbach	2–1 (Note: After extra-time.)	1. FC Köln	Rheinstadion	69,600
3	1974–75	29 January 1975	DFB-Pokal	Second round	Mönchengladbach	3–5	1. FC Köln	Bökelbergstadion	15,000

European

#	Season	Date	Competition	Round	Home Team	Result	Away Team	Stadium	Attendance
1	1972–73	28 November 1972	UEFA Cup	Round of 16	1. FC Köln	0–0	Mönchengladbach	Müngersdorfer Stadion	11,500
2	1972–73	13 December 1972	UEFA Cup	Round of 16	Mönchengladbach	5–0	1. FC Köln	Bökelbergstadion	11,500
3	1973–74	8 April 1975	UEFA Cup	Semi-finals	1. FC Köln	1–3	Mönchengladbach	Radstadion Köln	26,745
4	1973–74	23 April 1975	UEFA Cup	Semi-finals	Mönchengladbach	1–0	1. FC Köln	Bökelbergstadion	29,575

== Records ==
=== All-time top goalscorers ===
As of 8 November 2025

Ranks	Nation	Player	Club(s)	Years	League	DFB-Pokal	UEFA Cup	Overall
1	(Germany)	Hans Schäfer	1. FC Köln	1948–1965	14 (Note: Scored in Oberliga West.)	0	0	14
2	(Germany)	Jupp Heynckes	Mönchengladbach	1963–1967, 1970–1978	10	1	0	11
3	(Germany)	Christian Müller	1. FC Köln	1958–1966	10 (Note: Scored 8 goals in Oberliga West.)	0	0	10
3	(Germany)	Günter Netzer	Mönchengladbach	1963–1973	9	1	0	10
3	(Germany)	Uwe Rahn	Mönchengladbach	1963–1973	10	0	0	10
3	(Germany)	Uwe Rahn	1. FC Köln	1988–1990	0	0	0	10
6	(Germany)	Heinz Flohe	1. FC Köln	1966–1979	7	2	0	9
6	(Germany)	Klaus Allofs	1. FC Köln	1981–1987	9	0	0	9
6	(Germany)	Pierre Littbarski	1. FC Köln	1978–1986, 1987–1996	9	0	0	9
9	(Denmark)	Allan Simonsen	Mönchengladbach	1972–1979	5	1	2	8
9	(Germany)	Bernd Rupp	Mönchengladbach	1964–1967	2	0	0	8
9	(Germany)	Bernd Rupp	1. FC Köln	1969–1972	5	1	0	8
9	(Germany)	Karl-Heinz Thielen	1. FC Köln	1959–1973	8 (Note: Scored 7 goals in Oberliga West.)	0	0	8

=== All-time most appearances ===
As of 9 March 2024

Ranks	Nation	Player	Club(s)	Years	League	DFB-Pokal	UEFA Cup	Overall
1	(Germany)	Berti Vogts	Mönchengladbach	1965–1979	25	3	4	32
2	(Germany)	Herbert Wimmer	Mönchengladbach	1966–1978	24	3	3	30
3	(Germany)	Toni Schumacher	1. FC Köln	1972–1987	27	1	1	29
4	(Germany)	Heinz Flohe	1. FC Köln	1966–1979	21	3	3	27
4	(Germany)	Hannes Löhr	1. FC Köln	1964–1978	21	2	4	27
4	(Germany)	Bernhard Cullmann	1. FC Köln	1970–1984	20	3	4	27
7	(Germany)	Heinz Simmet	1. FC Köln	1967–1978	21	2	3	26
7	(Germany)	Wolfgang Overath	1. FC Köln	1962–1977	20	3	3	26
9	(Germany)	Uwe Kamps	Mönchengladbach	1982–2004	23	2	0	25
9	(Germany)	Wolfgang Kleff	Mönchengladbach	1968–1979, 1980–1982	18	3	4	25
11	(Germany)	Rainer Bonhof	Mönchengladbach	1970–1978	13	3	3	24
11	(Germany)	Rainer Bonhof	1. FC Köln	1980–1983	5	0	0	24
11	(Germany)	Harald Konopka	1. FC Köln	1971–1983	18	2	4	24

=== Hattricks ===
Player	For	Against	Result	Date	Competition	Ref.
(Germany) Hans Schäfer ^{4}	1. FC Köln	Mönchengladbach	6–0 (A)	12 October 1952	1952–53 Oberliga West	
(Germany) Karl-Heinz Thielen ^{4}	1. FC Köln	Mönchengladbach	6–1 (A)	28 October 1961	1961–62 Oberliga West	
(Germany) Günter Netzer	Mönchengladbach	1. FC Köln	4–1 (A)	18 January 1969	1968–69 Bundesliga	
(Germany) Jupp Heynckes	Mönchengladbach	1. FC Köln	5–2 (H)	2 December 1972	1972–73 Bundesliga	
(Germany) Klaus Allofs	1. FC Köln	Mönchengladbach	3–2 (A)	11 May 1985	1984–85 Bundesliga	
(Germany) Martin Max	Mönchengladbach	1. FC Köln	4–0 (A)	13 November 1993	1993–94 Bundesliga	
(Netherlands) Arie van Lent	Mönchengladbach	1. FC Köln	4–0 (H)	5 February 2002	2001–02 Bundesliga	

Note ^{4}: Player scored 4 goals.

=== Discipline ===
Player	For	Against	(yellow card) (yellow-red card)	Red card	Date	Competition	Ref.
(Germany) Rico Steinmann	1. FC Köln	Mönchengladbach	–	1	13 April 1996	1995–96 Bundesliga	
(Guinea) Pablo Thiam	1. FC Köln	Mönchengladbach	1	–	13 April 1996	1995–96 Bundesliga	
(Slovenia) Igor Demo	Mönchengladbach	1. FC Köln	1	–	20 March 2000	1999–2000 2. Bundesliga	
(Germany) Markus Hausweiler	Mönchengladbach	1. FC Köln	1	–	20 March 2000	1999–2000 2. Bundesliga	
(Zambia) Moses Sichone	1. FC Köln	Mönchengladbach	–	1	3 August 2003	2003–04 Bundesliga	
(Germany) Roland Benschneider	1. FC Köln	Mönchengladbach	–	1	18 February 2006	2005–06 Bundesliga	
(North Macedonia) Aleksandar Mitreski	1. FC Köln	Mönchengladbach	1	–	22 October 2007	2007–08 Bundesliga	
(Netherlands) Roel Brouwers	Mönchengladbach	1. FC Köln	–	1	7 April 2008	2007–08 Bundesliga	
(Austria) Florian Kainz	1. FC Köln	Mönchengladbach	1	–	9 October 2022	2022–23 Bundesliga	
(France) Manu Koné	Mönchengladbach	1. FC Köln	–	1	22 October 2023	2023–24 Bundesliga	

=== Results ===
==== Biggest wins (5+ goals) ====
Winning margin	Result	Date	Competition
6	München-Gladbach 0–6 FC Köln	12 October 1952	1952–53 Oberliga West
6	FC Köln 6–0 München-Gladbach	22 February 1953	1952–53 Oberliga West
5	München-Gladbach 1–6 FC Köln	29 October 1961	1961–62 Oberliga West
5	Mönchengladbach 5–1 FC Köln	13 December 1972	1972–73 UEFA Cup

==== Most total goals in a match ====
Goals	Result	Date	Competition
8	FC Köln 6–2 Mönchengladbach	10 September 1950	1950–51 Oberliga West
8	FC Köln 6–2 Mönchengladbach	29 January 1975	1974–75 DFB-Pokal
8	FC Köln 4–4 Mönchengladbach	29 October 1979	1979–80 Bundesliga
7	FC Köln 5–2 Mönchengladbach	13 April 1957	1956–57 Oberliga West
7	Mönchengladbach 1–6 FC Köln	29 October 1961	1961–62 Oberliga West
7	FC Köln 2–5 Mönchengladbach	25 November 1967	1967–68 Bundesliga
7	FC Köln 4–3 Mönchengladbach	2 October 1971	1971–72 Bundesliga
7	Mönchengladbach 5–2 FC Köln	2 December 1971	1971–72 Bundesliga
7	Mönchengladbach 2–5 FC Köln	1 September 1977	1977–78 Bundesliga
7	Mönchengladbach 5–2 FC Köln	9 October 2022	2022–23 Bundesliga

==== Longest runs ====
===== Most consecutive wins =====
Games	Club	Period
8	Mönchengladbach	26 November 1966 – 11 April 1970
7	FC Köln	10 September 1950 – 12 December 1954
7	FC Köln	29 August 1959 – 28 October 1962
7	Mönchengladbach	8 April 1975 – 12 April 1977

===== Most consecutive draws =====
Games	Period
3	25 February 1978 – 22 March 1980

===== Most consecutive matches without a draw =====
Games	Period
14	14 February 2015 – 9 October 2022
12	10 September 1950 – 13 April 1957
10	31 October 1981 – 11 May 1985
9	29 August 1959 – 20 November 1965
9	26 November 1966 – 5 August 1970
9	29 January 1975 – 1 September 1977
9	8 April 1986 – 7 April 1990

===== Longest undefeated runs =====
Games	Club	Period
11	FC Köln	14 October 1956 – 28 October 1962
9	Mönchengladbach	14 March 2009 – 14 February 2015
8	Mönchengladbach	26 November 1966 – 11 April 1970
7	1. FC Köln	10 September 1950 – 12 December 1954
7	Mönchengladbach	8 April 1975 – 12 April 1977
7	Mönchengladbach	10 April 1993 – 13 April 1996

===== Most consecutive matches without conceding a goal =====
Games	Club	Period
4	1. FC Köln	22 February 1953 – 12 December 1954
4	Mönchengladbach	25 November 2011 – 14 February 2015

===== Most consecutive games scoring =====
Games	Club	Period
20	Mönchengladbach	13 December 1972 – 18 April 1981
17	Mönchengladbach	10 March 1963 – 25 March 1972
13	1. FC Köln	10 September 1950 – 17 August 1958
11	1. FC Köln	29 August 1959 – 26 November 1966
10	1. FC Köln	18 April 1981 – 7 September 1985

=== Honours ===
1. FC Köln	Competition	Mönchengladbach
National
2	Bundesliga	5
4	2. Bundesliga	1
4	DFB-Pokal	3
1	Fußballmeisterschaft (defunct)	—
11	Aggregate	9
European
—	UEFA Cup	2
—	Aggregate	2
Regional
5	Oberliga West (defunct)	—
5	Aggregate	—
16	Total aggregate	11
