= 1977 DFB-Pokal final =

- Match programme cover
- Event: 1976–77 DFB-Pokal
Hertha BSC	1. FC Köln
- 1. FC Köln won after a replay

Final
Hertha BSC	1. FC Köln
1	1
- After extra time
- Date: 28 May 1977
- Venue: Niedersachsenstadion, Hanover
- Referee: Rudolf Frickel (Munich)
- Attendance: 54,000

Replay
Hertha BSC	1. FC Köln
0	1
- Date: 30 May 1977
- Venue: Niedersachsenstadion, Hanover
- Referee: Klaus Ohmsen (Hamburg)
- Attendance: 35,000

The 1977 DFB-Pokal final decided the winner of the 1976–77 DFB-Pokal, the 34th season of Germany's knockout football cup competition. The original final was played on 28 May 1977 at the Niedersachsenstadion in Hanover. The match between Hertha BSC and 1. FC Köln finished 1–1 after extra time, requiring a replay two days later. On 30 May 1977, once again at the Niedersachsenstadion in Hanover, 1. FC Köln won the replay 1–0 to claim their 2nd cup title.

This was the first and only DFB-Pokal final ever to require a replay, as the final rules changed the next season, requiring a penalty shoot-out if the scores remain level following extra time.

== Route to the final ==
The DFB-Pokal began with 128 teams in a single-elimination knockout cup competition. There were a total of six rounds leading up to the final. Teams were drawn against each other, and the winner after 90 minutes would advance. If still tied, 30 minutes of extra time was played. If the score was still level, a replay would take place at the original away team's stadium. If still level after 90 minutes, 30 minutes of extra time was played. If the score was still level, a penalty shoot-out was used to determine the winner.

Note: In all results below, the score of the finalist is given first (H: home; A: away).

Hertha BSC		Round	1. FC Köln
Opponent	Result	1976–77 DFB-Pokal	Opponent	Result
TuS Langerwehe (H)	7–3	Round 1	Itzehoer SV (A)	7–0
Bayern Hof (H)	3–1	Round 2	Fortuna Düsseldorf (A)	4–2 (a.e.t.)
Darmstadt 98 (A)	1–0 (a.e.t.)	Round 3	Tennis Borussia Berlin (H)	5–1
MSV Duisburg (A)	2–1	Round of 16	FC 08 Homburg (H)	7–2
Bayern Munich (H)	4–2 (a.e.t.)	Quarter-finals	1. FC Nürnberg (H)	4–2
Bayer Uerdingen (A)	1–0	Semi-finals	Rot-Weiss Essen (H)	4–0

== Original match ==
=== Details ===
28 May 1977
17:30 CET

Hertha BSC	1–1 (a.e.t.)	1. FC Köln
Horr 64'	Report	Müller 44'

Niedersachsenstadion, Hanover
Attendance: 54,000
Referee: Rudolf Frickel (Munich)

Hertha BSC	1. FC Köln

GK	1	(West Germany) Norbert Nigbur
RB	(West Germany) Michael Sziedat
CB	(West Germany) Uwe Kliemann
CB	(West Germany) Holger Brück
LB	(West Germany) Hans Weiner
CM	(West Germany) Erwin Hermandung	(substituted off) 69'
CM	(West Germany) Wolfgang Sidka
CM	(West Germany) Erich Beer (c)	Booked
RW	(West Germany) Gerhard Grau	(substituted off) 112'
CF	(West Germany) Karl-Heinz Granitza
LW	(West Germany) Lorenz Horr
Substitutes:
DF	(West Germany) Hans-Joachim Förster	(substituted on) 112'
MF	(West Germany) Bernd Gersdorff	(substituted on) 69'
Manager:
(West Germany) Georg Keßler

GK	1	(West Germany) Harald Schumacher
RB		(West Germany) Harald Konopka
CB		(West Germany) Herbert Zimmermann
CB		(West Germany) Gerd Strack
LB		(West Germany) Roland Gerber
CM		(West Germany) Heinz Simmet
CM		(West Germany) Wolfgang Overath	(substituted off) 91'
CM		(West Germany) Heinz Flohe
RW		(Belgium) Roger Van Gool
CF		(West Germany) Dieter Müller
LW		(West Germany) Hannes Löhr (c)	(substituted off) 81'
Substitutes:
MF		(West Germany) Herbert Neumann	(substituted on) 91'
FW		(Denmark) Preben Elkjær	(substituted on) 81'
Manager:
(West Germany) Hennes Weisweiler

Match rules

- 90 minutes.
- 30 minutes of extra time if necessary.
- Replay if scores still level.
- Maximum of two substitutions.

== Replay ==
=== Details ===
30 May 1977
16:00 CET

Hertha BSC	0–1	1. FC Köln
	Report	Müller 70'

Niedersachsenstadion, Hanover
Attendance: 35,000
Referee: Klaus Ohmsen (Hamburg)

Hertha BSC	1. FC Köln

GK	1	(West Germany) Norbert Nigbur
RB		(West Germany) Michael Sziedat
CB		(West Germany) Uwe Kliemann
CB		(West Germany) Holger Brück
LB		(West Germany) Hans Weiner	Booked
CM		(West Germany) Erwin Hermandung		(substituted off) 80'
CM		(West Germany) Wolfgang Sidka	Booked	(substituted off) 70'
CM		(West Germany) Erich Beer (c)
RW		(West Germany) Gerhard Grau
CF		(West Germany) Karl-Heinz Granitza
LW		(West Germany) Lorenz Horr
Substitutes:
MF		(West Germany) Bernd Gersdorff		(substituted on) 70'
MF		(Denmark) Jørgen Kristensen		(substituted on) 80'
Manager:
(West Germany) Georg Keßler

GK	1	(West Germany) Harald Schumacher
RB		(West Germany) Harald Konopka
CB		(West Germany) Gerd Strack
CB		(West Germany) Roland Gerber	Booked
LB		(West Germany) Herbert Zimmermann
CM		(West Germany) Heinz Simmet
CM		(West Germany) Herbert Neumann		(substituted off) 77'
CM		(West Germany) Heinz Flohe
RW		(Belgium) Roger Van Gool
CF		(West Germany) Dieter Müller
LW		(West Germany) Hannes Löhr (c)
Substitutes:
DF		(West Germany) Bernhard Cullmann		(substituted on) 77'
Manager:
(West Germany) Hennes Weisweiler

Match rules

- 90 minutes.
- 30 minutes of extra time if necessary.
- Penalty shoot-out if scores still level.
- Maximum of two substitutions.
