= 1977–78 Bundesliga =

15th season of the Bundesliga

Bundesliga
- Season: 1977–78
- Dates: 6 August 1977 – 29 April 1978
- Champions: 1. FC Köln; 2nd Bundesliga title 3rd German title
- Relegated: TSV 1860 Munich; 1. FC Saarbrücken; FC St. Pauli
- European Cup: 1. FC Köln
- Cup Winners' Cup: Fortuna Düsseldorf (losing DFB-Pokal finalists to Köln)
- UEFA Cup: Borussia Mönchengladbach; Hertha BSC; VfB Stuttgart; MSV Duisburg
- Goals: 993
- Average goals/game: 3.25
- Top goalscorer: Dieter Müller (24); Gerd Müller (24)
- Biggest home win: M'gladbach 12–0 Dortmund (29 April 1978)
- Biggest away win: Br'schweig 0–6 M'gladbach (29 October 1977)
- Highest scoring: M'gladbach 12–0 Dortmund (12 goals) (29 April 1978)

The 1977–78 Bundesliga was the 15th season of the Bundesliga, West Germany's premier football league. It began on 6 August 1977 and ended on 29 April 1978. Borussia Mönchengladbach were the defending champions.

== Competition modus ==
Every team played two games against each other team, one at home and one away. Teams received two points for a win and one point for a draw. If two or more teams were tied on points, places were determined by goal difference and, if still tied, by goals scored. The team with the most points were crowned champions while the three teams with the fewest points were relegated to their respective 2. Bundesliga divisions.

== Team changes to 1976–77 ==
Karlsruher SC, Tennis Borussia Berlin and Rot-Weiss Essen were relegated to the 2. Bundesliga after finishing in the last three places. They were replaced by FC St. Pauli, winners of the 2. Bundesliga Northern Division, VfB Stuttgart, winners of the Southern Division and TSV 1860 Munich, who won a promotion play-off series against Arminia Bielefeld.

== Season overview ==
The 1977–78 season, which ended earlier than usual due to the upcoming World Cup in Argentina, ended with 1. FC Köln winning the title, but the decision had been closer than anybody would have imagined. The team from Cologne was level on points with Borussia Mönchengladbach before the final round of matches of the season, but had a ten-goal lead in goal difference over their rivals. Nevertheless, Mönchengladbach managed to close the gap with a 12–0 victory in their last match against Borussia Dortmund. However, the team around Jupp Heynckes and Berti Vogts missed out on the title by three goals because Köln won 5–0 against FC St. Pauli at the same time.

== Team overview ==
Location of teams in Bundesliga 1977–78

Club	Location	Ground	Capacity
Hertha BSC Berlin	Berlin	Olympiastadion	100,000
VfL Bochum	Bochum	Ruhrstadion	40,000
Eintracht Braunschweig	Braunschweig	Eintracht-Stadion	38,000
SV Werder Bremen	Bremen	Weserstadion	32,000
Borussia Dortmund	Dortmund	Westfalenstadion	54,000
MSV Duisburg	Duisburg	Wedaustadion	38,500
Fortuna Düsseldorf	Düsseldorf	Rheinstadion	59,600
Eintracht Frankfurt	Frankfurt	Waldstadion	62,000
Hamburger SV	Hamburg	Volksparkstadion	80,000
1. FC Kaiserslautern	Kaiserslautern	Stadion Betzenberg	42,000
1. FC Köln	Cologne	Müngersdorfer Stadion	61,000
Borussia Mönchengladbach	Mönchengladbach	Bökelbergstadion	34,500
TSV 1860 Munich	Munich	Olympiastadion	80,000
FC Bayern Munich	Munich	Olympiastadion	80,000
1. FC Saarbrücken	Saarbrücken	Ludwigspark	40,000
FC Schalke 04	Gelsenkirchen	Parkstadion	70,000
FC St. Pauli	Hamburg	Wilhelm-Koch-Stadion	32,000
VfB Stuttgart	Stuttgart	Neckarstadion	72,000

== League table ==
Pos	Team	Pld	W	D	L	GF	GA	GD	Pts	Qualification or relegation
1	1. FC Köln (C)	34	22	4	8	86	41	+45	48	Qualification to European Cup first round
2	Borussia Mönchengladbach	34	20	8	6	86	44	+42	48	Qualification to UEFA Cup first round (Note: As 1. FC Köln also won the DFB-Pokal, the Cup Winners' Cup spot was given to runners-up Fortuna Düsseldorf, while Düsseldorf's original UEFA Cup was transferred to MSV Duisburg.)
3	Hertha BSC	34	15	10	9	59	48	+11	40	Qualification to UEFA Cup first round
4	VfB Stuttgart	34	17	5	12	58	40	+18	39	Qualification to UEFA Cup first round
5	Fortuna Düsseldorf	34	15	9	10	49	36	+13	39	Qualification to Cup Winners' Cup first round
6	MSV Duisburg	34	15	7	12	62	59	+3	37	Qualification to UEFA Cup first round
7	Eintracht Frankfurt	34	16	4	14	59	52	+7	36	
8	1. FC Kaiserslautern	34	16	4	14	64	63	+1	36	
9	Schalke 04	34	14	6	14	47	52	−5	34	
10	Hamburger SV	34	14	6	14	61	67	−6	34	
11	Borussia Dortmund	34	14	5	15	57	71	−14	33	
12	Bayern Munich	34	11	10	13	62	64	−2	32	
13	Eintracht Braunschweig	34	14	4	16	43	53	−10	32	
14	VfL Bochum	34	11	9	14	49	51	−2	31	
15	Werder Bremen	34	13	5	16	48	57	−9	31	
16	1860 Munich (R)	34	7	8	19	41	60	−19	22	Relegation to 2. Bundesliga
17	1. FC Saarbrücken (R)	34	6	10	18	39	70	−31	22	Relegation to 2. Bundesliga
18	FC St. Pauli (R)	34	6	6	22	44	86	−42	18	Relegation to 2. Bundesliga

Source: www.dfb.de
Rules for classification: 1) points; 2) goal difference; 3) number of goals scored.
(C) Champions; (R) Relegated

== Results ==
Home \ Away	BSC	BOC	EBS	SVW	BVB	DUI	F95	SGE	HSV	FCK	KOE	BMG	M60	FCB	FCS	S04	STP	VFB
Hertha BSC	—	4–3	1–0	2–0	3–1	2–2	0–0	2–0	3–2	2–1	1–1	2–1	4–1	3–1	1–1	2–1	5–0	1–1
VfL Bochum	5–0	—	1–1	2–0	1–0	1–2	2–1	0–1	2–1	0–1	0–0	0–0	2–0	2–1	4–2	1–1	4–0	1–0
Eintracht Braunschweig	1–1	3–1	—	2–0	0–1	1–0	2–0	1–1	4–0	3–1	1–0	0–6	2–1	1–1	3–0	3–1	2–0	3–1
Werder Bremen	4–2	1–0	2–1	—	3–1	4–2	2–1	3–0	1–2	5–3	0–2	3–2	2–0	1–1	1–1	2–0	4–0	0–1
Borussia Dortmund	1–1	5–3	2–0	4–1	—	2–1	1–2	0–2	2–1	4–0	1–2	3–3	1–3	1–1	2–1	2–1	1–1	4–1
MSV Duisburg	2–1	0–0	3–1	2–0	1–2	—	0–0	3–0	5–2	3–2	1–2	1–1	1–1	6–3	5–0	1–0	4–3	2–1
Fortuna Düsseldorf	0–0	1–1	2–0	2–0	1–0	0–0	—	2–1	3–1	4–1	5–1	1–3	2–0	4–2	2–1	1–1	3–1	1–0
Eintracht Frankfurt	0–5	5–3	2–0	0–2	2–1	3–1	4–0	—	0–2	1–3	2–2	4–2	1–0	4–0	4–0	3–0	5–2	2–0
Hamburger SV	2–2	3–1	4–2	1–1	4–1	4–1	0–3	0–0	—	3–1	1–0	2–6	3–0	2–2	1–2	2–0	0–2	2–0
1. FC Kaiserslautern	2–0	4–1	2–1	2–1	4–0	6–1	3–2	2–0	3–0	—	0–2	0–3	1–0	5–0	2–1	0–0	2–1	0–4
1. FC Köln	3–1	2–1	6–0	7–2	4–1	5–2	1–0	0–1	6–1	4–1	—	1–1	6–2	2–0	3–1	2–4	4–1	2–1
Borussia Mönchengladbach	2–1	2–2	3–1	4–0	12–0	1–3	3–2	2–0	2–1	2–2	2–5	—	2–1	2–0	6–1	2–1	2–1	3–1
1860 Munich	2–3	2–0	1–0	0–0	0–2	4–0	0–1	2–4	2–2	2–2	1–3	1–1	—	1–1	2–0	0–0	4–1	1–2
Bayern Munich	0–2	1–1	3–2	3–1	3–0	3–2	0–0	2–1	2–0	4–2	0–3	1–1	1–3	—	7–1	7–1	4–2	2–0
1. FC Saarbrücken	2–2	0–1	0–1	1–1	2–2	1–2	1–1	0–0	3–5	3–3	1–0	0–1	1–1	2–1	—	2–1	4–0	1–1
Schalke 04	2–0	3–1	1–0	1–0	0–2	0–1	1–0	3–2	2–2	3–0	2–0	1–2	2–1	3–2	2–0	—	4–1	3–1
FC St. Pauli	3–0	1–1	0–1	3–1	3–6	2–2	2–1	5–3	2–3	0–3	0–5	0–1	4–1	0–0	1–3	1–1	—	1–1
VfB Stuttgart	1–0	3–1	5–0	2–0	4–1	1–0	1–1	2–1	1–2	3–0	3–0	2–0	3–1	3–3	1–0	6–1	1–0	—

Source: DFB
Legend: Blue = home team win; Yellow = draw; Red = away team win.

== Top goalscorers ==
24 goals

- (Germany) Dieter Müller (1. FC Köln)
- (Germany) Gerd Müller (FC Bayern Munich)

21 goals

- (Germany) Klaus Toppmöller (1. FC Kaiserslautern)

20 goals

- (Germany) Manfred Burgsmüller (Borussia Dortmund)
- (Germany) Klaus Fischer (FC Schalke 04)

18 goals

- (Germany) Jupp Heynckes (Borussia Mönchengladbach)

17 goals

- (Germany) Karl-Heinz Granitza (Hertha BSC)
- (Denmark) Allan Simonsen (Borussia Mönchengladbach)

16 goals

- (Germany) Franz Gerber (FC St. Pauli)
- (Germany) Rudolf Seliger (MSV Duisburg)

== Champion squad ==
1. FC Köln
Goalkeeper: Harald Schumacher (34).

Defenders: Roland Gerber (34 / 2); Gerd Strack (32 / 2); Herbert Zimmermann (32 / 2); Harald Konopka (31 / 3); Bernhard Cullmann (27 / 6); Herbert Hein (4); Rainer Nicot (1).
Midfielders: Heinz Flohe (34 / 14); Herbert Neumann (34 / 8); Heinz Simmet (23 / 1); Yasuhiko Okudera (Japan) (20 / 4); Dieter Prestin (14 / 3); Holger Willmer (11 / 1); Jürgen Glowacz (5).
Forwards: Dieter Müller (33 / 24); Roger Van Gool (Belgium) (32 / 12); Hannes Löhr (8 / 1).
(league appearances and goals listed in brackets)

Manager: Hennes Weisweiler.

On the roster but have not played in a league game: Gerald Ehrmann; Wolfgang Weber; Heinz Pape; Norbert Schmitz; Preben Elkjær (Denmark) ; Klaus Kösling.

== Attendances ==
No.	Team	Attendance	Change	Highest
1	VfB Stuttgart	55,559	145.8%	72,000
2	Borussia Dortmund	37,843	-12.6%	54,000
3	Schalke 04	35,694	-5.0%	70,000
4	1. FC Köln	35,235	9.1%	60,000
5	Hamburger SV	31,235	-9.8%	61,000
6	Bayern München	30,876	-2.1%	77,000
7	TSV 1860	27,812	38.3%	65,000
8	Borussia Mönchengladbach	26,059	3.7%	55,000
9	Eintracht Frankfurt	26,018	8.5%	58,000
10	Hertha BSC	25,047	-4.9%	80,000
11	1. FC Kaiserslautern	24,676	21.8%	34,000
12	VfL Bochum	23,888	48.8%	36,000
13	1. FC Saarbrücken	23,435	-18.6%	34,000
14	Fortuna 95	22,576	10.3%	53,000
15	Werder Bremen	19,947	6.5%	36,000
16	Eintracht Braunschweig	19,235	-11.6%	35,000
17	MSV Duisburg	18,529	-6.4%	35,000
18	FC St. Pauli	13,071	74.4%	28,000
