= Glowacz =

Glowacz or Głowacz (Polish pronunciation: [ˈɡwɔvat͡ʂ]) is a surname of Polish-language origin. It may refer to:

- Jürgen Glowacz (born 1952), German footballer
- Stefan Glowacz (born 1965), German rock climber
