= Dieter Prestin =

German footballer

Personal information
- Date of birth: 23 August 1956 (age 70)
- Place of birth: Hürth, West Germany
- Height: 1.74 m (5 ft 8 1/2 in)
- Position: Defender

Senior career*
Years	Team	Apps	(Gls)
1975–1989	1. FC Köln	246	(7)
- * Club domestic league appearances and goals

Dieter Prestin (born 23 August 1956) is a retired German football player. He spent 14 seasons in the Bundesliga with 1. FC Köln.

== Honours ==
- UEFA Cup finalist: 1985–86
- Bundesliga champion: 1977–78
- Bundesliga runner-up: 1981–82, 1988–89
- DFB-Pokal winner: 1976–77, 1977–78, 1982–83
- DFB-Pokal finalist: 1979–80
