= VfR Achern =

German football club

- Full name: Verein für Rasenspiele 1907 Achern/Hornisgrinde
- Founded: 1907
- Ground: Hornisgrindstadion
- League: Kreisliga A (IX)
- 2015–16: Bezirksliga Baden-Baden (VIII), 18th (relegation)
Home colours	Away colours

VfR Achern is a German football club from the city of Achern, Baden-Württemberg near the Hornisgrinde mountain. The club was established on 17 October 1907 as Fußball-Club Achern and adopted the name Verein für Rasenspiele Achern in 1910.

== History ==
For most of its history Achern played in lower-tier local competition. They briefly came to notice in the late 1930s when they captured the title in the Bezirksliga Freiburg (II) and subsequently played a single season in the wartime Gauliga Baden-Süd (I).

With the outbreak of World War II in 1939, German football was reorganized to deal with player shortages and travel restrictions. The Gauliga Baden-Süd was one of 16 top flight regional leagues in the country. Originally made up of 10 teams in a single division, it was expanded to include 20 teams playing in 5 sub-divisions. Each sub-division was a city-based local circuit to help reduce the need for travel. Achern finished atop the Staffel Offenburg in the 1939–40 season and took part in the combined Gauliga playoff where they fared poorly. The following season, the Gauliga Baden-Süd returned to a 10 team regional format; Achern did not qualify and returned to lower-tier play.

After the war occupying Allied authorities ordered the dissolution of most organizations in the country, including sports and football clubs, as part of the process of denazification. New associations soon appeared and VfR was reestablished on 13 July 1946 as Sportverein Achern. They advanced to the Amateurliga Südbaden (II) in 1949 where they earned a third-place result. On 2 September 1950, SV reassumed its traditional identity as VfR and spent another 5 seasons as a lower table club in the Amateurliga until finally being sent down in 1955.

Achern resurfaced for a single season in the now third-tier Amateurliga in 1965–66, but were promptly relegated. They immediately bounced back with a division championship in the 2. Amateurliga Südbaden (IV) and spent three more seasons in third-division play. They took part in preliminary round play for the DFB-Pokal (German Cup) in 1977 and made their last appearance in the Amateurliga in the 1977–78 season. The team, for a long period of time, competed in the Landesliga Südbaden 1 (VI), having last played in the tier-four Verbandsliga Südbaden in 1993.

In 2011, VfR was relegated from the Landesliga to the Bezirksliga, quickly returned to the Landesliga play after a title win in 2013 but was relegated again in 2014. the following season the club dropped another level, now to the Bezirksliga. Another relegation followed in the 2015–16 season, now to the Kreisliga A.

== Honours ==
- Bezirksliga Freiburg (II)
  - Champions: 1939
- 2. Amateurliga Südbaden (IV)
  - Champions: 1967
- Bezirksliga Baden-Baden (VIII)
  - Champions: 2013
