= Rainer Nicot =

German footballer

Personal information
- Date of birth: 6 June 1954 (age 72)
- Position: Defender

Senior career*
Years	Team	Apps	(Gls)
1971–1981	1. FC Köln	8	(0)
- * Club domestic league appearances and goals

Rainer Nicot (born 6 June 1954) is a retired German football player. He spent five seasons in the Bundesliga with 1. FC Köln, and overall ten years in the club system, including the reserves.

== Honours ==
1. FC Köln

- Bundesliga: 1977–78
- DFB-Pokal: 1976–77, 1977–78
