= Roland Gerber =

Roland Gerber may refer to:

- Roland Gerber (ice hockey) (born 1984), Swiss ice hockey player
- Roland Gerber (footballer) (1953–2015), German football coach and player
