= Herbert Hein =

German footballer

Personal information
- Date of birth: 27 March 1954 (age 72)
- Place of birth: Germany
- Height: 1.80 m (5 ft 11 in)
- Position: Defender

Youth career
- 1. FC Quadrath-Ichendorf

Senior career*
Years	Team	Apps	(Gls)
1972–1978	1. FC Köln	106	(7)
1979–1984	Borussia Dortmund	103	(1)
1984	Tennis Borussia Berlin		
- * Club domestic league appearances and goals

Herbert Hein (born 27 March 1954) is a retired German football player. He spent 12 seasons in the Bundesliga with 1. FC Köln and Borussia Dortmund.

== Honours ==
- Bundesliga champion: 1977–78
- Bundesliga runner-up: 1972–73
- DFB-Pokal winner: 1976–77, 1977–78
- DFB-Pokal finalist: 1972–73
