= Jürgen Glowacz =

German footballer

Personal information
- Date of birth: 30 September 1952 (age 74)
- Place of birth: Cologne, West Germany
- Height: 1.73 m (5 ft 8 in)
- Position: Midfielder

Team information
- Current team: 1. FC Köln (Vice-president)

Senior career*
Years	Team	Apps	(Gls)
1971–1977	1. FC Köln	154	(18)
1978	→ Werder Bremen (loan)	17	(3)
1978–1979	1. FC Köln	29	(2)
1979–1982	Bayer Leverkusen	53	(13)
Total		253	(36)
- * Club domestic league appearances and goals

Jürgen Glowacz (born 30 September 1952) is a German former footballer who played as a midfielder. He spent 11 seasons in the Bundesliga with 1. FC Köln, SV Werder Bremen and Bayer 04 Leverkusen. He is a vice-president of 1. FC Köln.

== Honours ==
1. FC Köln

- Bundesliga: 1977–78; runner-up 1972–73
- DFB-Pokal: 1976–77, 1977–78; finalist 1972–73
