= Heinz Flohe =

German footballer (1948-2013)

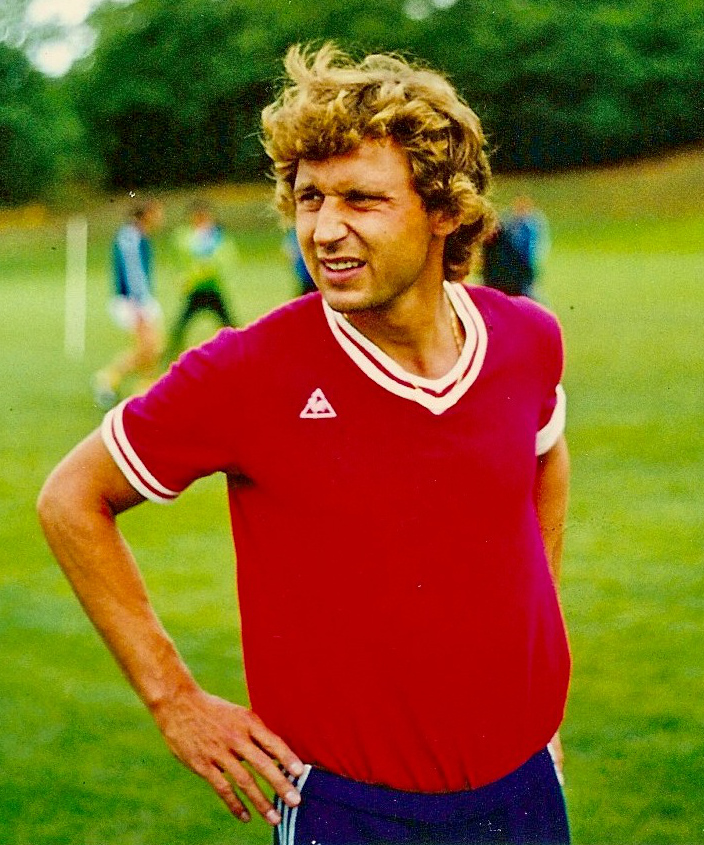
- Flohe in 1976

Personal information
- Full name: Heinz Flohe
- Date of birth: 28 January 1948
- Place of birth: Cologne, British occupation zone in Germany
- Date of death: 15 June 2013 (aged 65)
- Place of death: Vettweiß, Germany
- Height: 1.75 m (5 ft 9 in)
- Position: Midfielder

Youth career
- 1952–1966: TSC Euskirchen

Senior career*
Years	Team	Apps	(Gls)
1966–1979	1. FC Köln	329	(77)
1979–1980	TSV 1860 Munich	14	(4)
Total		343	(81)

International career
1965–1966	West Germany Youth	3	(1)
1967–1973	West Germany U23	4	(0)
1974	West Germany B	1	(0)
1970–1978	West Germany	39	(8)

Managerial career
- 1. FC Köln (assistant)
- 1981–1991: TSC Euskirchen
- TuS Olympia Ülpenich
Medal record
Men's football
Representing West Germany
FIFA World Cup
Winner	1974 West Germany
UEFA European Championship
Runner-up	1976 Yugoslavia
- * Club domestic league appearances and goals

Heinz "Flocke" Flohe (28 January 1948 – 15 June 2013) was a German footballer and manager.

== Career ==
Flohe played for 1. FC Köln (1966–1979), winning the Bundesliga title in 1978, and the DFB-Pokal in 1968, 1977 and 1978. He also played for TSV 1860 Munich (1979–1980). His career ended after a serious injury in his last match.

He earned 39 caps and scored 8 goals for West Germany. He was in the winning squad for the 1974 FIFA World Cup. He also played in the UEFA Euro 1976 and the 1978 FIFA World Cup.

== Personal life ==
On 11 May 2010, Flohe lapsed into coma, after a stroke and died on 15 June 2013, aged 65.

== Honours ==
=== Club ===
Köln

- Bundesliga: 1977–78; runner-up: 1972–73
- DFB-Pokal: 1967–68, 1976–77, 1977–78; runner-up: 1969–70, 1970–71, 1972–73

=== International ===
Germany

- FIFA World Cup: 1974
- UEFA European Championship: runner-up 1976
