= Rainer Bonhof =

German footballer (born 1952)

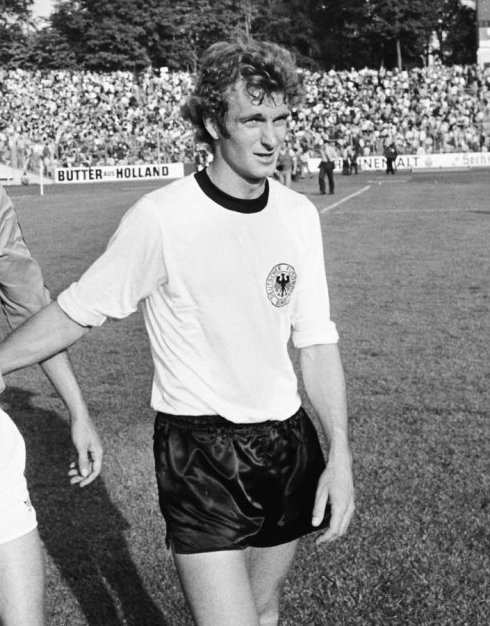
- Bonhof with West Germany in 1975

Personal information
- Date of birth: 29 March 1952 (age 74)
- Place of birth: Emmerich am Rhein, West Germany
- Height: 1.80 m (5 ft 11 in)
- Position: Midfielder

Team information
- Current team: Borussia Mönchengladbach (president)

Youth career
- 1963–1970: SuS Emmerich

Senior career*
Years	Team	Apps	(Gls)
1970–1978	Borussia Mönchengladbach	231	(42)
1978–1980	Valencia	61	(10)
1980–1983	1. FC Köln	74	(14)
1983	Hertha BSC	6	(1)
Total		371	(67)

International career
1971–1973	West Germany U23	5	(0)
1972–1981	West Germany	53	(9)

Managerial career
- 1990–1998: Germany (assistant coach)
- 1998: Germany U21
- 1998–1999: Borussia Mönchengladbach
- 2000–2001: Al-Kuwait
- 2002–2005: Scotland U21
Medal record
Men's football
Representing West Germany
FIFA World Cup
Winner	1974 West Germany
UEFA European Championship
Winner	1972 Belgium
Runner-up	1976 Yugoslavia
Winner	1980 Italy
- * Club domestic league appearances and goals

Rainer Bonhof (born 29 March 1952) is a German former professional footballer, who played as a defensive midfielder or wing-back. He was known for his occasional bursts upfield and his fierce shot. He was a key player for the 1974 West Germany national team that won the World Cup (defeating the Netherlands 2–1 in the final, where he provided the assist to the winning goal). Bonhof was one of the stars for his club side, Borussia Mönchengladbach, and won numerous domestic league and cup titles.

Since 2024, he has held the position of club president of Borussia Mönchengladbach.

== Club playing career ==
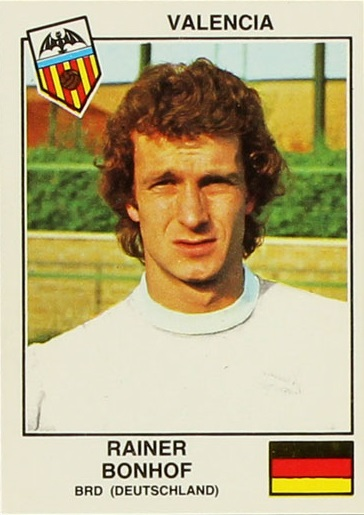
Bonhof with Valencia on a 1979 Panini sticker

Bonhof was part of the highly successful Borussia Mönchengladbach side of the 1970s, winning numerous Bundesliga, DFB-Pokal, and UEFA Cup titles. He was widely recognized as having one of the game's hardest free-kicks as well as long and precise throw-ins. He scored 14 goals in European cup competitions and amassed 57 goals in the West German top-flight. Bonhof was awarded the ARD Goal of the Month on three occasions, twice for free-kicks and once for a 30-metre strike.

== International playing career ==
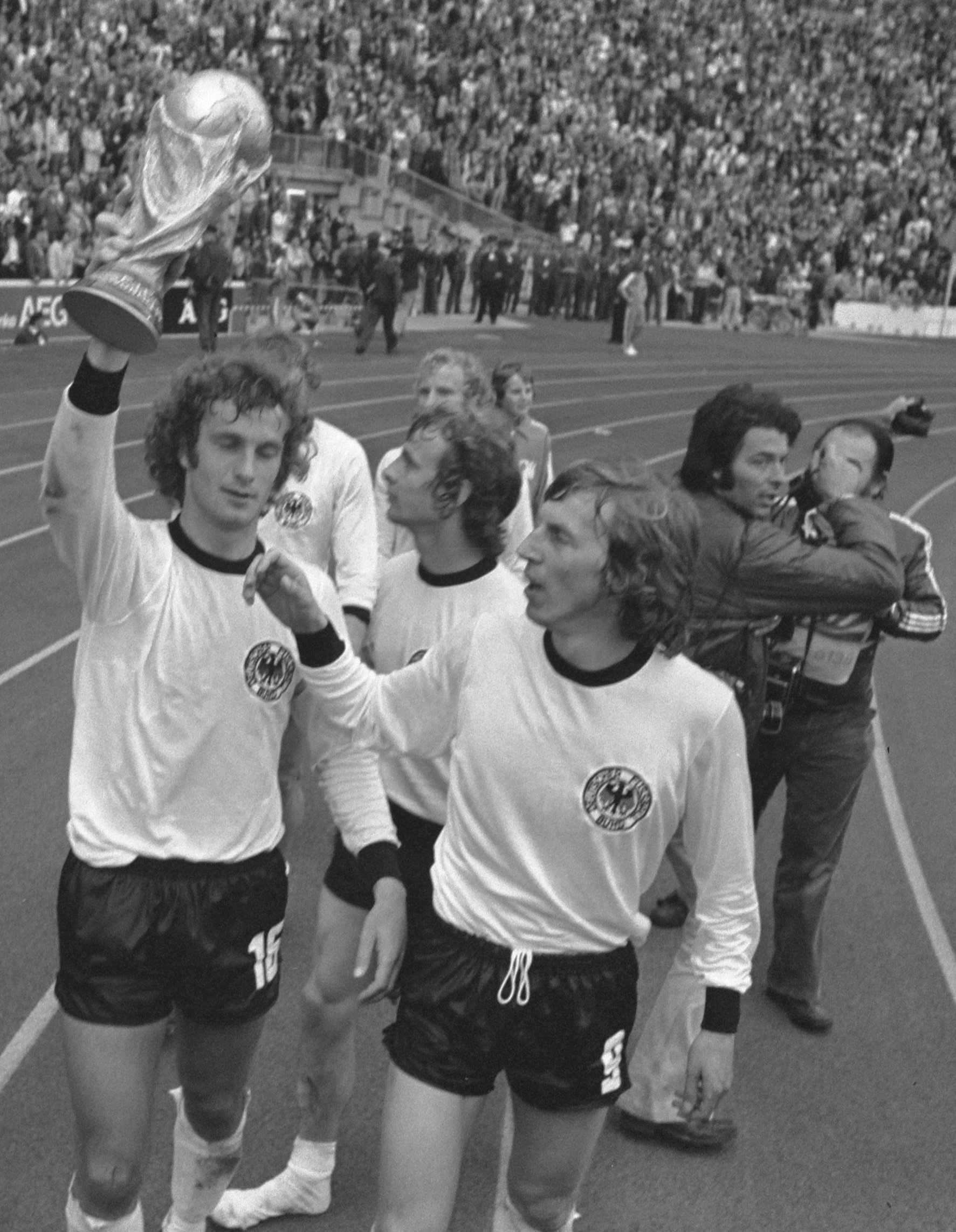
Bonhof holding the FIFA World Cup trophy with West Germany in 1974

On 18 October 1969, Bonhof played his first international junior match for West Germany in Geleen against the Netherlands, a match that ended 1:1. At that time, he had Dutch citizenship, as his grandfather was Dutch. Bonhof became a German citizen soon after this match. He won the first of his 53 senior caps in 1972. Bonhof was Germany's youngest World Cup winning player after it beat the Netherlands 2-1 on 7 July 1974 in Munich's Olympiastadion at the 1974 FIFA World Cup. His penetrating run into the opposition penalty area and pass to Gerd Muller led to the winning goal in that game. Two matches earlier Bonhof scored the goal that put West Germany up 2–1 against Sweden, a match the Germans eventually won 4–2. Bonhof was a fixture in the West Germany national team from that World Cup onward. He was regarded one of the best players in the 1976 European Championship, assisting for four of the six West German goals in the semi-final and final. West Germany lost to Czechoslovakia on penalties in the final.

Bonhof played in every match of the 1978 FIFA World Cup when West Germany was eliminated in the second round following a 3–2 defeat at the hands of their historic rivals, Austria. He continued to play an important role in the national team following his transfer to Valencia. His move and that of Uli Stielike prompted the DFB to remove their ban on selecting foreign based players for the national team. He played a role in qualifying for the 1980 European Championships and was selected for the squad, but injuries kept him from making an appearance during the West German victory. His last appearance for the national team came in a 4–1 defeat at the hands of Brazil, and in spite of a strong Bundesliga campaign for 1. FC Köln in 1981–82 he was not selected to return to the national team.

Between 1980 and 2012 Bonhof was the only player to have won the European Championships twice, although he did not play a single game in either the 1972 or 1980 tournaments. He now shares this record with 13 players from the Spanish national team; 12 who won back-to-back titles in 2008 and 2012 and Jesús Navas who won in 2012 and 2024. Bonhof remains the most decorated player in the history of the European Championships, with two gold medals and one silver.

Former Liverpool goalkeeper, Ray Clemence, in 1977, following a European Cup final between the Reds and Borussia Mönchengladbach, admitted he feared Bonhof's shots. His fear was to prove justified, as during the spring of 1978 Clemence was beaten twice by Bonhof from nearly identical locations at both club and international level. A Bonhof shot had beaten Clemence in the 1977 final, too, but that strike hit the post.

== Post-playing career ==
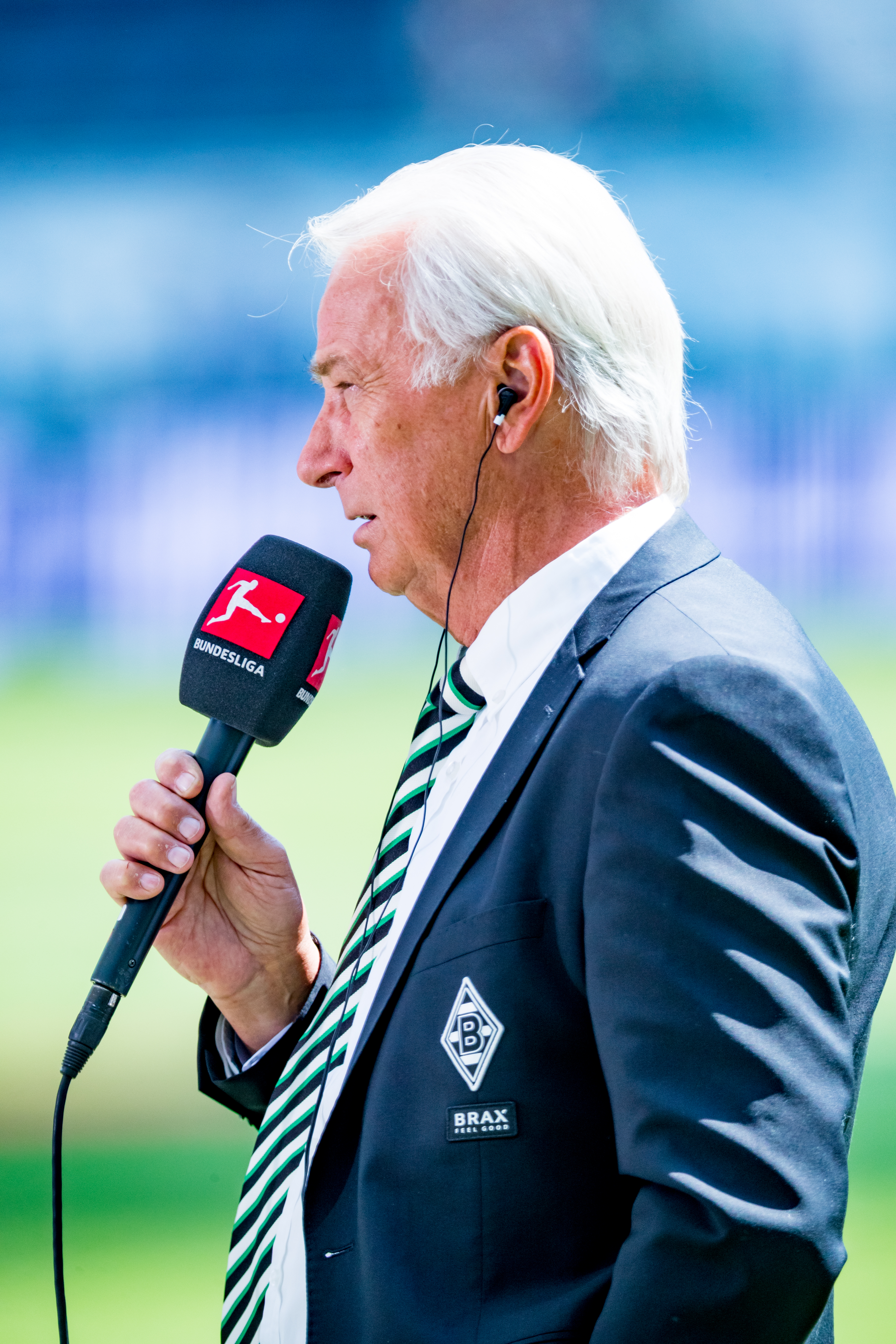
Rainer Bonhof in 2022.

Bonhof's playing career was abruptly ended by an ankle injury in 1983. He went on to coach several teams after receiving his formal license in 1988. Bonhof was coach of Borussia Moenchengladbach in the late 1990s, but the team was relegated from the Bundesliga. He was appointed manager of the Scotland under-21 team in 2002, joining the Scotland national team setup some months after countryman Berti Vogts had been appointed Scotland manager. Bonhof was the first full-time manager of the Scotland under-21 team. The team enjoyed initial success under Bonhof, winning an away qualifier against Germany and progressing to the qualifying playoffs for the 2004 European Championship. Scotland lost in the playoffs on aggregate to Croatia. Bonhof continued as Scotland under-21 manager after Vogts resigned as national team manager in November 2004, but resigned in November 2005 after the team went on a run of 14 games without a victory. Bonhof had helped Darren Fletcher and James McFadden progress to the full national team.

On 1 September 2006, Bonhof signed a contract with recent FA Premier League winners Chelsea to become their scout for the scopes of Germany and Austria. The contract was a rolling deal, allowing either Chelsea and Bonhof to break it up any time. The deal between Chelsea F.C. and Bonhof ended because of the club's high debts. Bonhof left London on 31 October 2008.

On 11 February 2009, he was named as the new vice president of Borussia Mönchengladbach. In March 2024, club president Rolf Königs resigned and Bonhof was appointed as his successor.

== Honours ==
Borussia Mönchengladbach

- Bundesliga: 1970–71, 1974–75, 1975–76, 1976–77
- DFB-Pokal: 1972–73
- UEFA Cup: 1974–75

Valencia

- Copa del Rey: 1978–79
- UEFA Cup Winners Cup: 1979–80

1. FC Köln

- DFB-Pokal: 1982–83

Germany

- FIFA World Cup: 1974
- UEFA European Championship: 1972, 1980
- UEFA European Championship: Runner-up: 1976

Individual

- kicker Bundesliga Team of the Season: 1973–74, 1976–77, 1977–78
- UEFA European Championship Team of the Tournament: 1976
- UEFA European Championship top assist provider: 1976
- World XI: 1975, 1977
- Sport Ideal European XI: 1976, 1977
- Onze Mondial: 1977
- Goal of the Year (Germany): 1978
