= Roland Gerber (footballer) =

German footballer and coach

Personal information
- Date of birth: 20 May 1953
- Place of birth: Lauda-Königshofen, West Germany
- Date of death: 24 February 2015 (aged 61)
- Place of death: Tauberbischofsheim, Germany
- Height: 1.76 m (5 ft 9 in)
- Position: Defender

Senior career*
Years	Team	Apps	(Gls)
1975–1981	1. FC Köln	127	(8)
1981–1982	SV Darmstadt 98	16	(0)
1982–1983	VfL Osnabrück	33	(2)

Managerial career
- 1996–1997: Kickers Würzburg
- 1997–1998: SV Distelhausen
- 2003: SV Westernhausen
- 2006–2007: VFB Bad Mergentheim
- * Club domestic league appearances and goals

Roland Gerber (20 May 1953 – 24 February 2015) was a German football coach and a former player. He spent seven seasons in the Bundesliga with 1. FC Köln and SV Darmstadt 98.

He died on 24 February 2015.

== Honours ==
- Bundesliga champion: 1977–78
- DFB-Pokal winner: 1976–77, 1977–78
- DFB-Pokal finalist: 1979–80
