= Heinz Simmet =

German footballer (1944–2024)

Personal information
- Date of birth: 22 November 1944
- Place of birth: Göttelborn, Nazi Germany
- Date of death: 31 January 2024 (aged 79)
- Place of death: Hürth
- Height: 1.73 m (5 ft 8 in)
- Positions: Midfielder; forward

Senior career*
Years	Team	Apps	(Gls)
1963–1966	Borussia Neunkirchen	43	(20)
1966–1967	Rot-Weiss Essen	33	(5)
1967–1978	1. FC Köln	357	(37)
Total		433	(62)

International career
	West Germany U-23	1	(1)
	West Germany B	2	(0)
- * Club domestic league appearances and goals

Heinz Simmet (22 November 1944 – 31 January 2024) was a German footballer who played as a midfielder or forward, making 419 appearances and scoring 55 goals in the Bundesliga. Simmet died in January 2024, at the age of 79.

== Honours ==
1. FC Köln

- Bundesliga: 1977–78
- DFB-Pokal: 1967–68, 1976–77, 1977–78
