= Hannes Löhr =

German footballer (1942–2016)

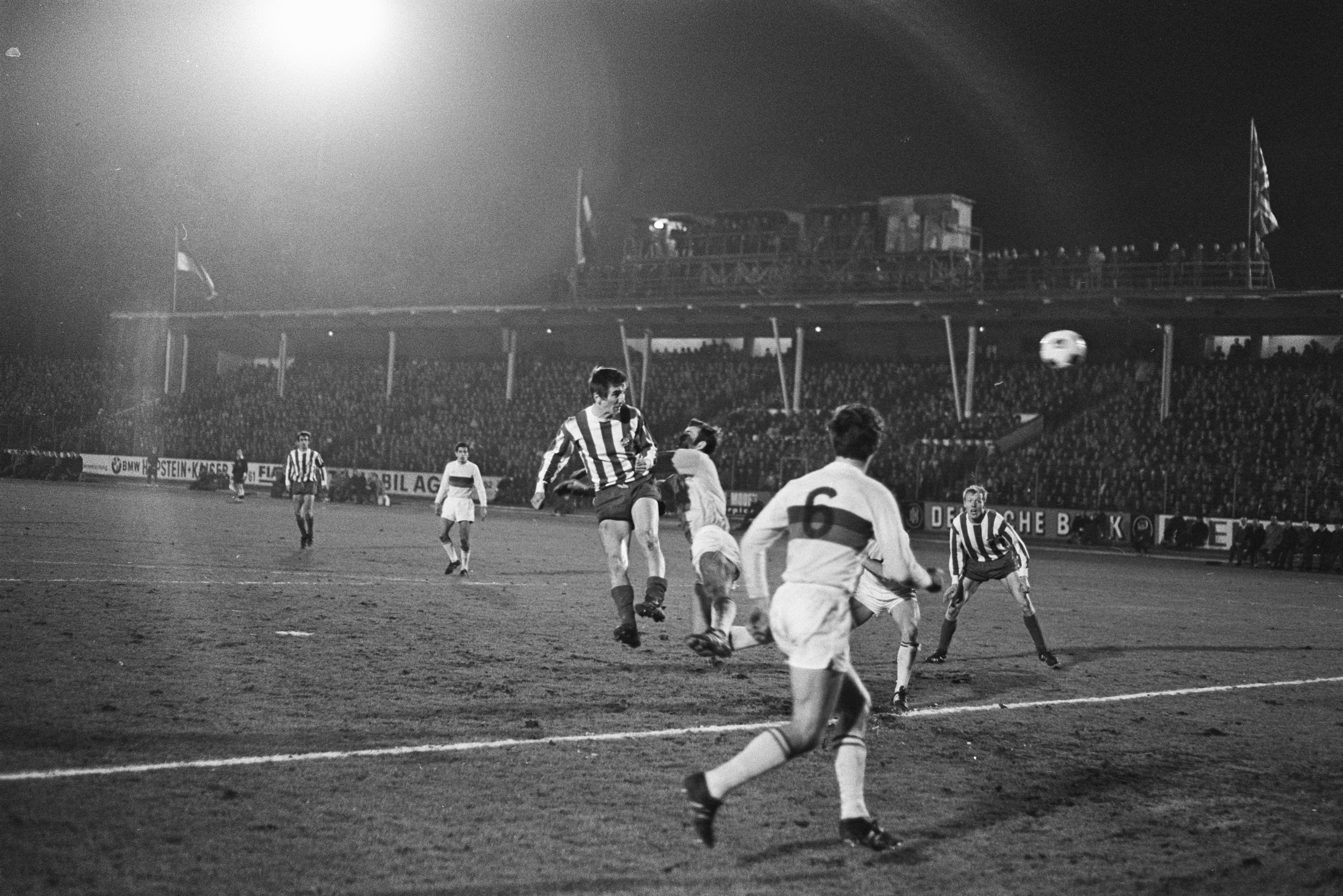
- Löhr scoring in 1968

Personal information
- Full name: Johannes Löhr
- Date of birth: 5 July 1942
- Place of birth: Eitorf, Germany
- Date of death: 29 February 2016 (aged 73)
- Place of death: Cologne, Germany
- Height: 1.76 m (5 ft 9 in)
- Position: Striker

Youth career
- 1951–1962: SV Eitorf 09

Senior career*
Years	Team	Apps	(Gls)
1962–1964	Sportfreunde Saarbrücken	60	(53)
1964–1978	1. FC Köln	381	(166)
Total		441	(219)

International career
1967–1972	West Germany	20	(5)

Managerial career
- 1983–1986: 1. FC Köln
- 1986–2002: (West) Germany U21
Medal record
Men's football
Representing West Germany
UEFA European Championship
Winner	1972 Belgium
FIFA World Cup
Third place	1970 Mexico
- * Club domestic league appearances and goals

Johannes "Hannes" Löhr (5 July 1942 – 29 February 2016) was a German professional football player and manager.

The striker scored 166 top division goals for 1. FC Köln, more than any other Köln player. He made his debut for the team in August 1964. His 27 goals in the 1967–68 season led the league, making him the first Köln player to do so.

Löhr won 20 caps for West Germany, scoring five goals. He appeared in all six matches of the DFB team at the 1970 FIFA World Cup in Mexico, playing as a left side attacker. It was his header back across the goal in extra-time against England, from a Jürgen Grabowski cross, that enabled Gerd Muller's winner in the 3–2 quarter-final win.

After his career as player, he managed 1. FC Köln between 1983 and 1986. In 1986, he began working for the DFB and was coach of the West German team that won Bronze at the 1988 Summer Olympics in Seoul.

He died on 29 February 2016.

== Honours ==
1. FC Köln

- Bundesliga: 1977–78
- DFB-Pokal: 1967–68, 1976–77, 1977–78

West Germany

- FIFA World Cup third place: 1970
- UEFA European Championship: 1972
