= Roger Van Gool =

Belgian footballer

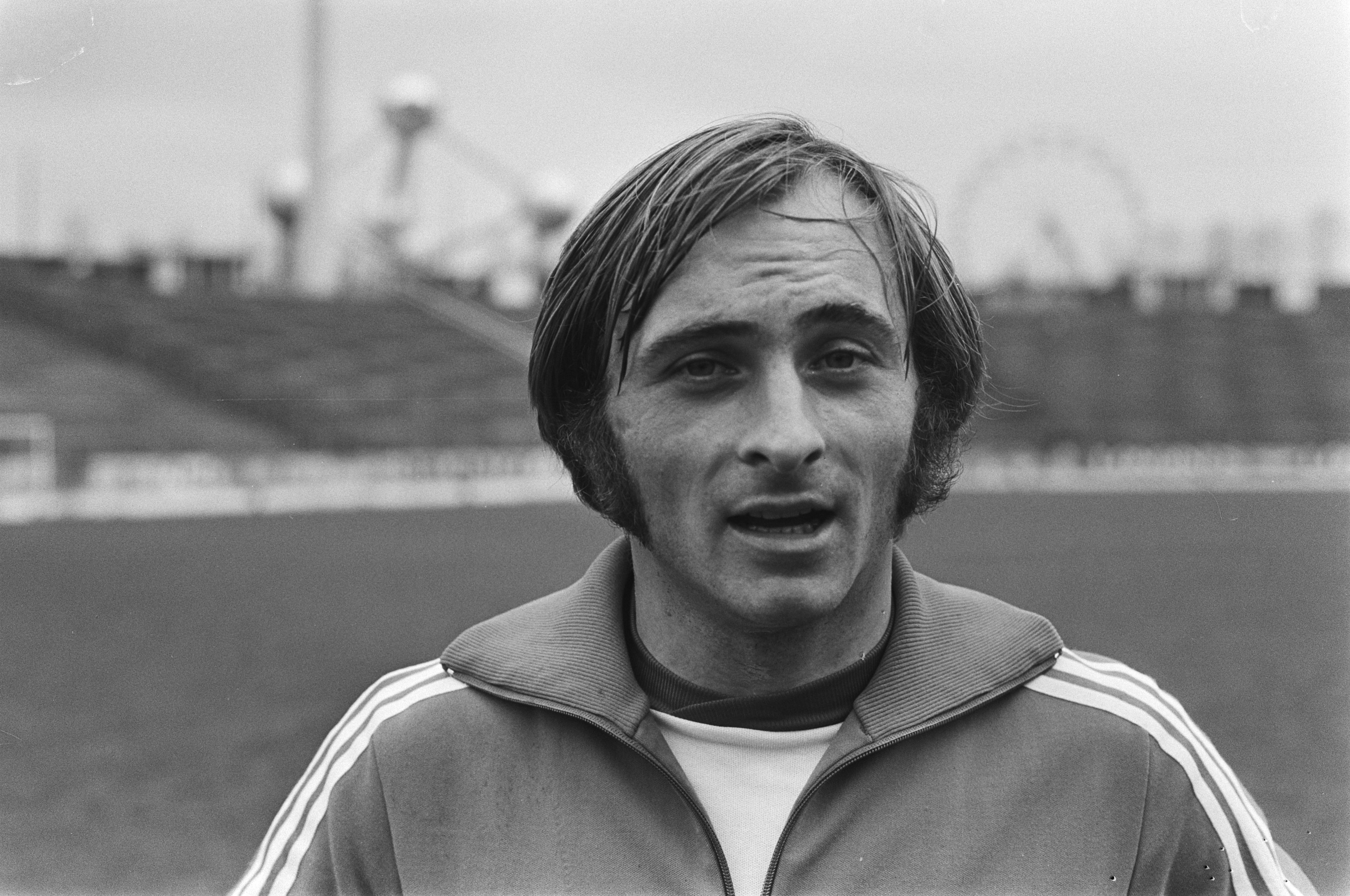
- Van Gool in 1977

Personal information
- Date of birth: 1 June 1950 (age 76)
- Place of birth: Nieuwmoer, Belgium
- Position: Forward

Senior career*
Years	Team	Apps	(Gls)
1967–1974	FC Antwerp	128	(20)
1974–1976	Club Brugge	68	(23)
1976–1980	1. FC Köln	96	(28)
1980–1981	Coventry City	17	(0)
1981–1982	FC Antwerp	20	(0)
1982–1984	Nîmes	24	(9)
1984–1985	Sint Niklaas	10	(0)
Total		363	(80)

International career
1975–1978	Belgium	7	(2)
- * Club domestic league appearances and goals

Roger Van Gool (born 1 June 1950) is a Belgian former professional footballer who played as a forward. He made seven appearances for the Belgium national team scoring two goals.

== Club career ==
In 1976, Van Gool joined 1. FC Köln, becoming the first player in German football to be signed for a transfer fee of DM 1 million.

== Honours ==
Club Brugge

- Belgian First Division: 1975–76
- UEFA Cup: 1975–76 (runner-up)

1. FC Köln

- Bundesliga: 1977–78
- German Cup: 1976–77, 1977–78
