= 1972–73 DFB-Pokal =

Tournament details
- Country: West Germany
- Teams: 32

Final positions
- Champions: Borussia Mönchengladbach
- Runners-up: 1. FC Köln

Tournament statistics
- Matches played: 61

The 1972–73 DFB-Pokal was the 30th season of the annual German football cup competition. It began on 10 December 1972 and ended on 23 June 1973. 32 teams competed in the tournament of five rounds. As in the year before, the knock-out rounds were played over two legs, but the final was decided in a single game. In the memorable cup final, Borussia Mönchengladbach defeated 1. FC Köln 2–1 after extra time, with Günter Netzer substituting himself in before scoring the winning goal for Borussia.

== Matches ==
=== First round ===
Date	Home team	Score	Away team
10 December 1972	Hannover 96	1 – 0	Eintracht Frankfurt
20 December 1972	Eintracht Frankfurt	4 – 2	Hannover 96
Eintracht Frankfurt won 4 – 3 on aggregate
10 December 1972	VfL Wolfsburg	2 – 2	VfB Stuttgart
20 December 1972	VfB Stuttgart	3 – 2	VfL Wolfsburg
VfB Stuttgart won 5 – 4 on aggregate
10 December 1972	OSV Hannover	0 – 6	Hertha BSC
20 December 1972	Hertha BSC	3 – 0	OSV Hannover
Hertha BSC won 9 – 0 on aggregate
10 December 1972	FK Pirmasens	4 – 1	Rot-Weiß Oberhausen
20 December 1972	Rot-Weiß Oberhausen	4 – 0	FK Pirmasens
Rot-Weiß Oberhausen won 5 – 4 on aggregate
10 December 1972	Stuttgarter Kickers	1 – 1	Eintracht Braunschweig
20 December 1972	Eintracht Braunschweig	5 – 1	Stuttgarter Kickers
Eintracht Braunschweig won 6 – 2 on aggregate
10 December 1972	Wacker 04 Berlin	1 – 5	SV Werder Bremen
20 December 1972	SV Werder Bremen	4 – 0	Wacker 04 Berlin
SV Werder Bremen won 9 – 1 on aggregate
10 December 1972	Rot-Weiß Essen	5 – 3	Hamburger SV
20 December 1972	Hamburger SV	5 – 0 aet	Rot-Weiß Essen
Hamburger SV won 8 – 5 on aggregate
10 December 1972	FC St. Pauli	3 – 1	Kickers Offenbach
20 December 1972	Kickers Offenbach	3 – 0	FC St. Pauli
Kickers Offenbach won 4 – 3 on aggregate
10 December 1972	VfR Wormatia Worms	4 – 4	VfL Bochum
20 December 1972	VfL Bochum	3 – 1	VfR Wormatia Worms
VfL Bochum won 7 – 5 on aggregate
10 December 1972	SV Südwest Ludwigshafen	1 – 3	FC Schalke 04
20 December 1972	FC Schalke 04	3 – 1	SV Südwest Ludwigshafen
FC Schalke 04 won 6 – 2 on aggregate
10 December 1972	Preußen Münster	2 – 1	MSV Duisburg
20 December 1972	MSV Duisburg	3 – 0	Preußen Münster
MSV Duisburg won 4 – 2 on aggregate
10 December 1972	HSV Barmbek-Uhlenhorst	1 – 4	FC Bayern Munich
20 December 1972	FC Bayern Munich	7 – 0	HSV Barmbek-Uhlenhorst
FC Bayern Munich won 11 – 1 on aggregate
10 December 1972	Freiburger FC	3 – 1	Borussia Mönchengladbach
20 December 1972	Borussia Mönchengladbach	7 – 1	Freiburger FC
Borussia Mönchengladbach won 8 – 4 on aggregate
10 December 1972	SpVgg Bayreuth	4 – 2	1. FC Kaiserslautern
20 December 1972	1. FC Kaiserslautern	4 – 0	SpVgg Bayreuth
1. FC Kaiserslautern won 6 – 4 on aggregate
10 December 1972	SC Fortuna Köln	2 – 1	1. FC Köln
20 December 1972	1. FC Köln	4 – 0 aet	SC Fortuna Köln
1. FC Köln won 5 – 2 on aggregate
10 December 1972	Wuppertaler SV	3 – 0	Fortuna Düsseldorf
20 December 1972	Fortuna Düsseldorf	2 – 0	Wuppertaler SV
Wuppertaler SV won 3 – 2 on aggregate

=== Round of 16 ===
Date	Home team	Score	Away team
3 March 1973	Eintracht Braunschweig	1 – 0	Eintracht Frankfurt
14 March 1973	Eintracht Frankfurt	2 – 2	Eintracht Braunschweig
Eintracht Braunschweig won 3 – 2 on aggregate
3 March 1973	Wuppertaler SV	3 – 2	Kickers Offenbach
14 March 1973	Kickers Offenbach	3 – 0	Wuppertaler SV
Kickers Offenbach won 5 – 2 on aggregate
3 March 1973	MSV Duisburg	1 – 2	Hertha BSC
14 March 1973	Hertha BSC	4 – 2	MSV Duisburg
Hertha BSC won 6 – 3 on aggregate
3 March 1973	FC Schalke 04	0 – 2	Borussia Mönchengladbach
14 March 1973	Borussia Mönchengladbach	1 – 1	FC Schalke 04
Borussia Mönchengladbach won 3 – 1 on aggregate
3 March 1973	Hamburger SV	2 – 2	1. FC Köln
14 March 1973	1. FC Köln	4 – 1	Hamburger SV
1. FC Köln won 6 – 3 on aggregate
3 March 1973	Rot-Weiß Oberhausen	1 – 2	FC Bayern Munich
14 March 1973	FC Bayern Munich	3 – 1	Rot-Weiß Oberhausen
FC Bayern Munich won 5 – 2 on aggregate
3 March 1973	VfL Bochum	4 – 4	SV Werder Bremen
14 March 1973	SV Werder Bremen	2 – 1	VfL Bochum
SV Werder Bremen won 6 – 5 on aggregate
3 March 1973	VfB Stuttgart	2 – 1	1. FC Kaiserslautern
14 March 1973	1. FC Kaiserslautern	2 – 0 aet	VfB Stuttgart
1. FC Kaiserlautern won 3 – 2 on aggregate

=== Quarter-finals ===
Date	Home team	Score	Away team
14 April 1973	Eintracht Braunschweig	0 – 5	1. FC Köln
18 April 1973	1. FC Köln	3 – 2	Eintracht Braunschweig
1. FC Köln won 8 – 2 on aggregate
14 April 1973	Kickers Offenbach	2 – 2	FC Bayern Munich
18 April 1973	FC Bayern Munich	2 – 4	Kickers Offenbach
Kickers Offenbach won 6 – 4 on aggregate
3 March 1973	SV Werder Bremen	2 – 0	Hertha BSC
14 March 1973	Hertha BSC	2 – 2	SV Werder Bremen
SV Werder Bremen won 4 – 2 on aggregate
3 March 1973	Borussia Mönchengladbach	2 – 1	1. FC Kaiserslautern
14 March 1973	1. FC Kaiserslautern	1 – 3	Borussia Mönchengladbach
Borussia Mönchengladbach won 5 – 2 on aggregate

=== Semi-finals ===
Date	Home team	Score	Away team
1 May 1973	1. FC Köln	5 – 0	Kickers Offenbach
16 May 1973	Kickers Offenbach	1 – 1	1. FC Köln
1. FC Köln won 6 – 1 on aggregate
2 May 1973	Werder Bremen	1 – 3	Borussia Mönchengladbach
16 May 1973	Borussia Mönchengladbach	4 – 2	Werder Bremen
Borussia Mönchengladbach won 7 – 3 on aggregate

=== Final ===
23 June 1973
16:00 CET

Borussia Mönchengladbach	2–1 (a.e.t.)	1. FC Köln
Wimmer 24'; Netzer 94'	Report	Neumann 40'

Rheinstadion, Düsseldorf
Attendance: 69,600
Referee: Kurt Tschenscher (Mannheim)
