= Harald Konopka =

German football player

Personal information
- Full name: Harald Konopka
- Date of birth: 18 November 1952 (age 73)
- Place of birth: Düren, West Germany
- Height: 1.78 m (5 ft 10 in)
- Positions: Defender; full back

Youth career
- Teutonia Echtz
- Düren 99
- 1. FC Köln

Senior career*
Years	Team	Apps	(Gls)
1971–1983	1. FC Köln	335	(21)
1983–1984	Borussia Dortmund	17	(0)
Total		352	(21)

International career
1978–1979	West Germany	2	(0)
- * Club domestic league appearances and goals

Harald Konopka (born 18 November 1952 in Düren, West Germany) is a former German football player.

Initially a striker, Konopka joined 1. FC Köln in time to capture the German U19 title in 1971, the summer he turned professional. Sort of an ever-present member of the first-team, the tough tackling defender excelled in a full back role for his club throughout the years. He won three German Cup's with 1. FC Köln and was runner-up with them in two other editions. Ending up on the second best position in Bundesliga with Köln two times, Konopka was part of the famous 1. FC Köln squad that won the Bundesliga under manager Hennes Weisweiler in 1978 to complete a remarkable achievement of a national cup and league in the same season (double). A few months into his final year in Bundesliga, Konopka left 1. FC Köln to join Borussia Dortmund for the remainder of his career. In total he played in 352 Bundesliga matches, scoring 21 goals.

Konopka's career for West Germany was a brief one, lasting for only two matches, but earned him a participation in the 1978 FIFA World Cup. Making the squad as one of two uncapped players (the other one was Gerd Zewe), Konopka came to action as a substitute for his injured 1. FC Köln team-mate Herbert Zimmermann in the goalless draw against Italy at Estadio Monumental Antonio Vespucio Liberti. Almost a year later he appeared in his final international for his country, featuring entirely in the 3–1 win over Iceland.
