= Herbert Zimmermann (footballer) =

Former German footballer

Personal information
- Full name: Herbert Zimmermann
- Date of birth: 1 July 1954 (age 72)
- Place of birth: Engers, West Germany
- Height: 1.78 m (5 ft 10 in)
- Positions: Striker; centre back

Youth career
- 1960–1972: FV Engers 07

Senior career*
Years	Team	Apps	(Gls)
1972–1974	FC Bayern Munich	2	(0)
1974–1984	1. FC Köln	202	(22)
Total		204	(22)

International career
1977–1980	West Germany B	6	(0)
1976–1979	West Germany	14	(2)
Medal record
Representing West Germany
UEFA European Championship
Winner	1980 Italy
- * Club domestic league appearances and goals

Herbert Zimmermann (born 1 July 1954) is a former German footballer who played as a forward or defender.

== Club career ==
A successful striker, Zimmermann was signed by FC Bayern Munich and also appeared as central defender for 1. FC Köln, the club he joined after he did not get enough games at Bayern. Injury worries of his new club made him appear as defender and doing well on that adopted position prevented him from giving up his new role. After being just part of the squad of FC Bayern Munich that won the Bundesliga in 1973 and 1974, and the European Cup in 1974, Zimmermann was a vital figure for Köln in Köln's DFB-Pokal wins in 1977 and 1983.

In 1978, he and his club even won the DFB-Pokal and the Bundesliga title (a double), his greatest achievement as a regular on club level. Hampered by injuries in his final years in the game, Zimmermann played in 204 Bundesliga matches (22 goals).

== International career ==
As defender he debuted for West Germany in a friendly at Wales in October 1976. His career for his country was in best prime in 1978 and 1979, years where he won the vast majority of his altogether 14 caps. In 1979, he even found the net, scoring vital goals in 1980 UEFA European Championship qualifiers against Wales and Turkey. These goals brought him a call-up to the 1980 UEFA European Championship winning squad of his nation, not knowing that the mentioned qualifying fixture against Turkey would remain his final cap. In Italy he wasn't used because of an injury. Two years earlier, in 1978, he had been with West Germany at the FIFA World Cup in Argentina, taking part against Poland and dropping out injured in the second half of the goalless draw against Italy at Estadio Monumental Antonio Vespucio Liberti in Buenos Aires.
