= Herbert Neumann =

German footballer (born 1953)

Personal information
- Date of birth: 14 November 1953 (age 72)
- Place of birth: Cologne, West Germany
- Height: 1.80 m (5 ft 11 in)
- Position: Midfielder

Senior career*
Years	Team	Apps	(Gls)
1972–1980	1. FC Köln	184	(35)
1980–1981	Udinese	25	(1)
1981–1982	Bologna	20	(1)
1982–1983	1. FC Köln	10	(1)
1983–1984	Olympiacos	23	(4)
1984–1989	Chiasso		

International career
1978	West Germany	1	(0)

Managerial career
- 1986–1989: Chiasso
- 1989–1991: FC Zürich
- 1993–1995: Vitesse
- 1995: Anderlecht
- 1996–1997: Istanbulspor
- 1997–1998: NAC Breda
- 1999–2000: Vitesse
- 2005–2006: VVV-Venlo
- * Club domestic league appearances and goals

Herbert Neumann (born 14 November 1953) is a German former professional footballer who played as a midfielder.

== Club career ==
Neumann was born in Cologne. He played for 1. FC Köln, Udinese Calcio, Bologna, Olympiacos Piraeus, and FC Chiasso. In the Bundesliga Neumann scored 36 goals in 194 matches.

== International career ==
In 1978 Neumann made his one international appearance for West Germany national team.

== Coaching career ==
After his professional career as a player, Neumann started to work as a football manager for FC Zürich, RSC Anderlecht, Istanbulspor, NAC Breda, Vitesse, and VVV-Venlo.
