= 1977–78 DFB-Pokal =

Tournament details
- Country: West Germany
- Teams: 128

Final positions
- Champions: 1. FC Köln
- Runners-up: Fortuna Düsseldorf

Tournament statistics
- Matches played: 138

The 1977–78 DFB-Pokal was the 35th season of the annual German football cup competition. It began on 29 July 1977 and ended on 15 April 1978. 128 teams competed in the tournament of seven rounds. In the final FC Köln defeated Fortuna Düsseldorf 2–0, thus defending their title from the last season.

== Mode ==
The tournament consisted of seven single elimination rounds. In case a game ended with a draw 30 minutes of extra time were played. If the score was still level the game was replayed with 30 minutes of extra time in case of another draw. If still no winner could be determined, a penalty shootout decided which team advanced to the next round.

For the first time the final was not to be replayed in case of a draw after 120 minutes. In that case a penalty shootout would decide the winner of the DFB-Pokal.

== Matches ==
=== First round ===
29 July 1977
TSV 1860 München	4 – 2	Arminia Bielefeld
Kickers Offenbach	0 – 4	1. FC Köln
Göttingen 05	0 – 2	FC Schalke 04
TSV Ofterdingen	0 – 5	Hamburger SV
Eintracht Braunschweig	10 – 1	Eintracht Nordhorn
VfB Stuttgart	10 – 0	TuS Eintracht Bremen
RSV Rehburg	1 – 6	Hertha BSC
FC Konstanz	1 – 6	Eintracht Frankfurt
FC St. Wendel	1 – 6	Fortuna Düsseldorf
Blumenthaler SV 1919	1 – 5	SV Werder Bremen
SG Ellingen-Bonefeld	1 – 6	FC St. Pauli
1. FC Viersen 05	0 – 8	Borussia Mönchengladbach
FSV Ludwigshafen	0 – 3	1. FC Kaiserslautern
TuS Sulzbach-Rosenberg	1 – 11	MSV Duisburg
VfB Oldenburg	0 – 2	VfL Bochum
TSV Ottobrunn	0 – 9	Borussia Dortmund
Rot-Weiß Essen	3 – 2	VfR 1910 Bürstadt
Wuppertaler SV Borussia	2 – 2	SC Herford	(AET)
OSC Bremerhaven	3 – 2	Preußen Münster
KSV Baunatal	2 – 3	Alemannia Aachen
Karlsruher SC	2 – 1	1. FC Nürnberg
SG Union Solingen	2 – 2	Schwarz-Weiß Essen	(AET)
FC 1908 Villingen	0 – 1	SpVgg Bayreuth
Heidenheimer SB	1 – 2	FK Pirmasens
SV Chio Waldhof	12 – 0	Lüssumer TV 1898
SG Wattenscheid 09	1 – 2	TSV Bleidenstadt	(AET)
Bayer 04 Leverkusen	5 – 0	FSV Salmrohr
FV Würzburg 04	1 – 0	Jahn Regensburg
Rendsburger TSV	0 – 2	VfL Osnabrück
1. FC Normannia Gmünd	2 – 0	SC Fortuna Köln
Eintracht Trier	3 – 0	Blau-Weiß Wulfen
Arminia Hannover	0 – 1	FC Augsburg II
Südwest Nürnberg	1 – 3	SV Darmstadt 98
FV Hassia Bingen	0 – 1	Stuttgarter Kickers
BV 08 Lüttringhausen	1 – 2	Freiburger FC
Concordia Hamburg	2 – 0	FC Bayern Hof
OSV Hannover	2 – 5	FSV Frankfurt
Westfalia Herne	6 – 1	BC Efferen 1920
SpVgg Bad Homburg	1 – 2	FC 08 Homburg
FC Olympia Kirrlach	0 – 6	Bayer Uerdingen
Hummelsbütteler SV	0 – 2	TuS Schloß Neuhaus
BV 04 Düsseldorf	3 – 0	VfL Bad Schwartau
1. Schleswiger SV 06	0 – 1	Röchling Völklingen	(AET)
VfV Hildesheim	4 – 1	TV Unterboihingen
Itzehoer SV 1909	2 – 1	Borussia Brand
VfL Wolfsburg	3 – 1	FSV Bad Orb
SV Saar 05 Saarbrücken	0 – 0	Wacker 04 Berlin	(AET)
TuRa Harksheide	1 – 1	SV Ottweiler	(AET)
Horner TV	2 – 1^{*}	Alemannia Eggenstein
1. FSV Mainz 05	7 – 1	FC Hertha 03 Zehlendorf
Viktoria Köln	0 – 2	Eintracht Bad Kreuznach
SC Gladenbach	2 – 1	SuS Elspe
SpVgg EGC Wirges	2 – 3	DSC Wanne-Eickel
Viktoria 89 Berlin	2 – 3	BSV Schwenningen	(AET)
Bonner SC	5 – 1	Sportfreunde Eisbachtal
SV 1916 Sandhausen	3 – 1	Traber SC Berlin
FC Rastatt 04	2 – 1	TuS Struck
Lichterfelder SU	2 – 2	Alemannia Plaidt	(AET)
Warendorfer SU	3 – 1	FSV Hemmersdorf
TuS 08 Langerwehe	3 – 0	VfB Coburg
FC Augsburg	1 – 0	SpVgg Fürth
Hannover 96	0 – 2	Tennis Borussia Berlin
10 August 1977
1. FC Saarbrücken	1 – 2	FC Bayern Munich
FC Tailfingen	3 – 2	SpVgg Neckargemünd

^{*} Eggenstein objected formally against the result. A DFB-jury annulled the game and decided to hold a replay after Horner TV had already played their second round match against 1860 Munich. As Eggenstein won the replay the match Munich vs. Horner TV was also annulled and Munich had to play against Eggenstein.

==== Replays ====
10 August 1977
SC Herford	3 – 0	Wuppertaler SV Borussia
Schwarz-Weiß Essen	2 – 0	SG Union Solingen
Wacker 04 Berlin	1 – 1	SV Saar 05 Saarbrücken	(AET) (won 5–4 on penalties)
SV Ottweiler	2 – 1	TuS Harksheide
Alemannia Eggenstein	8 – 0	Horner TV
Alemannia Plaidt	3 – 1	Lichterfelder SU

=== Second round ===
19 August 1977
FC Bayern Munich	3 – 1	Eintracht Trier
1. FC Kaiserslautern	4 – 1	Wacker 04 Berlin
BV 04 Düsseldorf	1 – 4	Borussia Mönchengladbach
20 August 1977
Fortuna Düsseldorf	3 – 1	Borussia Dortmund
MSV Duisburg	3 – 0	VfB Stuttgart
FC St. Pauli	0 – 3	VfL Bochum
SV Chio Waldhof	1 – 3	Hertha BSC
Eintracht Braunschweig	3 – 1	Stuttgarter Kickers
TuS Schloß Neuhaus	2 – 2	Eintracht Frankfurt	(AET)
1. FC Köln	3 – 1	Eintracht Bad Kreuznach
1. FSV Mainz 05	1 – 4	Hamburger SV
Röchling Völklingen	0 – 4	SV Werder Bremen
Karlsruher SC	4 – 3	FK Pirmasens	(AET)
Bayer Uerdingen	0 – 3	FSV Frankfurt
Tennis Borussia Berlin	1 – 3	Westfalia Herne
VfL Osnabrück	2 – 1	SV Darmstadt 98
FC 08 Homburg	3 – 0	SC Herford
OSC Bremerhaven	0 – 1	FC Augsburg
FC Tailfingen	1 – 2	Rot-Weiß Essen
Bayer 04 Leverkusen	3 – 1	FC Rastatt 04
Schwarz-Weiß Essen	2 – 0	Concordia Hamburg
Warendorfer SU	1 – 4	Freiburger FC
TuS 08 Langerwehe	1 – 0	FV Würzburg 04	(AET)
VfV Hildesheim	3 – 0	Alemannia Aachen
Itzehoer SV 1909	1 – 6	SpVgg Bayreuth
1. FC Normannia Gmünd	1 – 2	FC Augsburg II
SC Gladenbach	1 – 5	SV 1916 Sandhausen
DSC Wanne-Eickel	3 – 1	VfL Wolfsburg
Alemannia Plaidt	1 – 2	Bonner SC
BSV Schwenningen	4 – 0	SV Ottweiler
FC Schalke 04	8 – 1	TSV Bleidenstadt
TSV 1860 München	15 – 0	Horner TV^{*}

^{*} Horner TV's first round match was annulled and replayed. As Horner TV lost the replay against Eggenstein, Eggenstein advanced to the second round and played against Munich.

==== Replays ====
24 August 1977
Eintracht Frankfurt	4 – 0	TuS Schloß Neuhaus
15 October 1977
TSV 1860 München	7 – 1	Alemannia Eggenstein

=== Third round ===
14 October 1977
MSV Duisburg	2 – 1	1. FC Kaiserslautern
FC Schalke 04	1 – 0	Eintracht Frankfurt
FC 08 Homburg	3 – 1	FC Bayern Munich
Fortuna Düsseldorf	4 – 1	Rot-Weiß Essen
Freiburger FC	2 – 6	VfL Bochum
FSV Frankfurt	0 – 3	1. FC Köln
FC Augsburg II	0 – 4	Hertha BSC
SV 1916 Sandhausen	0 – 4	Eintracht Braunschweig
DSC Wanne-Eickel	0 – 2	SV Werder Bremen
Hamburger SV	6 – 0	VfV Hildesheim
Borussia Mönchengladbach	3 – 0	Bonner SC
Bayer 04 Leverkusen	1 – 5	Westfalia Herne
Karlsruher SC	2 – 0	SpVgg Bayreuth
TuS 08 Langerwehe	2 – 0	VfL Osnabrück
Schwarz-Weiß Essen	2 – 1	BSV Schwenningen	(AET)
26 October 1977
TSV 1860 München	3 – 0	FC Augsburg

=== Round of 16 ===
19 November 1977
FC Schalke 04	4 – 2	Hamburger SV
SV Werder Bremen	2 – 1	TSV 1860 München
1. FC Köln	4 – 0	Karlsruher SC
TuS 08 Langerwehe	1 – 3	MSV Duisburg
Borussia Mönchengladbach	3 – 0	VfL Bochum
Fortuna Düsseldorf	3 – 1	Eintracht Braunschweig
FC 08 Homburg	1 – 1	Hertha BSC	(AET)
Schwarz-Weiß Essen	0 – 0	Westfalia Herne	(AET)

==== Replays ====
29 November 1977
Hertha BSC	4 – 1	FC 08 Homburg	(AET)
Westfalia Herne	0 – 1	Schwarz-Weiß Essen

=== Quarter-finals ===
20 December 1977
1. FC Köln	9 – 0	Schwarz-Weiß Essen
MSV Duisburg	1 – 0	Hertha BSC
SV Werder Bremen	2 – 1	Borussia Mönchengladbach
FC Schalke 04	1 – 1	Fortuna Düsseldorf	(AET)

==== Replay ====
29 November 1977
Fortuna Düsseldorf	1 – 0	FC Schalke 04

=== Semi-finals ===
25 January 1978
1. FC Köln	1 – 0	SV Werder Bremen
Fortuna Düsseldorf	4 – 1	MSV Duisburg

=== Final ===
15 April 1978
16:00 CET

Fortuna Düsseldorf	0–2	1. FC Köln
	Report	Cullmann 71'; Van Gool 90'

Parkstadion, Gelsenkirchen
Attendance: 70,000
Referee: Jan Redelfs (Hanover)
