= 1976–77 DFB-Pokal =

Tournament details
- Country: West Germany
- Teams: 128

Final positions
- Champions: 1. FC Köln
- Runners-up: Hertha BSC

Tournament statistics
- Matches played: 137

The 1976–77 DFB-Pokal was the 34th season of the annual German football cup competition. It began on 6 August 1976 and ended on 30 May 1977. 128 teams competed in the tournament of seven rounds. In the final 1. FC Köln defeated Hertha BSC 1–0 in a replay after the first game ended in a draw after 120 minutes. It was the only DFB-Pokal final ever to be replayed.

== Matches ==
=== First round ===
6 August 1976
Hannover 96	0 – 1	MSV Duisburg
Hamburger SV	4 – 1	Schwarz-Weiß Essen
Fortuna Düsseldorf	3 – 1	Eintracht Trier
SV Wiesbaden 1899	1 – 3	FC Schalke 04
1. FC Kaiserslautern	1 – 0	VfR Mannheim
SV Werder Bremen	4 – 0	SV Südwest Ludwigshafen
Karlsruher SC	2 – 0	1. FC Bocholt
SpVgg Preußen 07 Hameln	0 – 5	1. FC Saarbrücken
Hertha BSC	7 – 3	TuS 08 Langerwehe
Borussia Dortmund	10 – 0	Concordia Haaren
SpVgg Steinhagen	0 – 3	VfL Bochum
SV Saar 05 Saarbrücken	1 – 6	Eintracht Frankfurt
Tennis Borussia Berlin	5 – 0	SC Sparta Bremerhaven
SV Meppen	2 – 3	Rot-Weiß Essen	(AET)
Itzehoer SV 1909	0 – 7	1. FC Köln
SC Fortuna Köln	4 – 1	Westfalia Herne
Kickers Offenbach	4 – 4	SpVgg Bayreuth	(AET)
VfB Stuttgart	3 – 0	SpVgg Fürth
FK Pirmasens	5 – 1	Preußen Münster
Bayer Uerdingen	6 – 0	VfB Weidenau
FC Bayern Hof	3 – 2	VfB Oldenburg
VfL Pinneberg	0 – 4	FC Augsburg
SV Chio Waldhof	6 – 0	Bremer SV
1. FC Köln II	1 – 2	Röchling Völklingen
FC Konstanz	0 – 2	Alemannia Aachen
SG Wattenscheid 09	5 – 1	TuRa Harksheide
Arminia Bielefeld	6 – 2	1. FC Passau	(AET)
Bayer 04 Leverkusen	4 – 0	IF Tönning
SV Werder Bremen II	0 – 3	1. FC Nürnberg
SC Freiburg	1 – 6	Stuttgarter Kickers
Jahn Regensburg	3 – 1	VfR Heilbronn
VfL Osnabrück	12 – 1	SC Union 06 Berlin
Wacker 04 Berlin	1 – 0	FC 1908 Villingen
Urania Hamburg	1 – 6	FC St. Pauli
SG Union Solingen	1 – 1	Pegulan Frankenthal	(AET)
SVA Gütersloh	2 – 3	SV Darmstadt 98	(AET)
FV Faurndau	1 – 4	FC Hanau 93
SSV 1911 Dillenburg	1 – 3	FC Bayern Munich II
FC Schweinfurt 05	2 – 3	FV Hassia Bingen
Hertha BSC II	0 – 2	DJK Gütersloh
FC Niederembt	1 – 3	Spandauer SV
VfB Theley	2 – 0	BFC Preußen Berlin
VfR Pforzheim	2 – 3	FC Olympia Bocholt
SV Neckargerach	3 – 1	SSV Ulm 1846
SG 99 Andernach	1 – 1	1. FSV Mainz 05	(AET)
1. FC Phönix Lübeck	0 – 2	Eintracht Bad Kreuznach
Sportfreunde Salzgitter	2 – 1	Hülser SC 1920
Lüner SV	0 – 1	SV Ellingen-Bonefeld	(AET)
SVO Germaringen	9 – 0	VfR Laboe
FC Hertha 03 Zehlendorf	1 – 0	TuS Mayen
Victoria Hamburg	1 – 0	FC Ensdorf
TuS Feuchtwangen	4 – 3	SV Weiskirchen	(AET)
1. FC Mülheim	0 – 3	SG Egelsbach
TV Unterboihingen	8 – 0	SG Dielheim
Sportfreunde Eisbachtal	1 – 1	TSG Leihgestern	(AET)
VfR Achern	2 – 0	BV Bad Lippspringe
TSV Güntersleben	1 – 2	SSV Reutlingen	(AET)
SV Bremerhaven 1893	3 – 0	VfR Neuss
FSV Frankfurt	5 – 0	SpVgg Freudenstadt
10 August 1976
Hannover 96 II	0 – 10	FC Bayern Munich
TSV 1860 München	2 – 1	Wuppertaler SV Borussia
FC 08 Homburg	2 – 1	SpVgg Erkenschwick
1 September 1976
Göttingen 05	1 – 2	VfR Wormatia Worms
7 September 1976
Borussia Mönchengladbach	0 – 2	Eintracht Braunschweig

==== Replays ====
1 September 1976
SpVgg Bayreuth	4 – 1	Kickers Offenbach
Pegulan Frankenthal	0 – 1	SG Union Solingen	(AET)
1. FSV Mainz 05	3 – 0	SG 99 Andernach
TSG Leihgestern	0 – 2	Sportfreunde Eisbachtal

=== Second round ===
16 October 1976
FC Bayern Munich	5 – 1	Hamburger SV
Fortuna Düsseldorf	2 – 4	1. FC Köln	(AET)
1. FC Saarbrücken	0 – 3	Rot-Weiß Essen
Hertha BSC	3 – 1	FC Bayern Hof
Stuttgarter Kickers	1 – 1	1. FC Kaiserslautern	(AET)
SV Werder Bremen	4 – 1	SG Wattenscheid 09
Alemannia Aachen	0 – 0	Borussia Dortmund
Röchling Völklingen	2 – 1	Eintracht Braunschweig
FC 08 Homburg	0 – 2	Karlsruher SC
Eintracht Frankfurt	10 – 2	FC Hertha 03 Zehlendorf
FC Schalke 04	6 – 1	SG Ellingen
VfB Theley	0 – 4	MSV Duisburg
Tennis Borussia Berlin	4 – 4	FC Olympia Bocholt	(AET)
Jahn Regensburg	1 – 2	SC Fortuna Köln	(AET)
SV Bremerhaven 1893	1 – 3	VfL Bochum
Bayer 04 Leverkusen	3 – 1	FC St. Pauli	(AET)
VfB Stuttgart	2 – 0	SG Union Solingen
Wacker 04 Berlin	0 – 5	1. FC Nürnberg
FSV Frankfurt	2 – 1	Eintracht Bad Kreuznach	(AET)
SG Egelsbach	0 – 2	VfL Osnabrück
Arminia Bielefeld	6 – 0	SVO Germaringen
FC Hanau 93	1 – 6	TSV 1860 München
Victoria Hamburg	2 – 5	SV Chio Waldhof
SV Neckargerach	2 – 3	FK Pirmasens
SpVgg Bayreuth	2 – 1	SSV Reutlingen
Spandauer SV	2 – 3	SV Darmstadt 98
Sportfreunde Salzgitter	1 – 2	FC Bayern Munich II
TuS Feuchtwangen	2 – 3	DJK Gütersloh	(AET)
Sportfreunde Eisbachtal	0 – 4	FV Hassia Bingen
VfR Achern	1 – 2	TV Unterboihingen
Bayer Uerdingen	3 – 0	1. FSV Mainz 05
VfR Wormatia Worms	1 – 2	FC Augsburg

==== Replays ====
9 November 1976
1. FC Kaiserslautern	3 – 1	Stuttgarter Kickers
Borussia Dortmund	2 – 0	Alemannia Aachen
17 November 1976
FC Olympia Bocholt	1 – 1	Tennis Borussia Berlin	(AET) (Berlin won 3–1 on penalties)
15 December 1976
FC 08 Homburg	1 – 0	Karlsruher SC

=== Third round ===
15 December 1976
1. FC Köln	5 – 1	Tennis Borussia Berlin
17 December 1976
Bayer Uerdingen	3 – 1	1. FC Kaiserslautern
18 December 1976
Rot-Weiß Essen	5 – 1	VfL Bochum
SV Werder Bremen	3 – 0	Bayer 04 Leverkusen
SV Darmstadt 98	0 – 1	Hertha BSC	(AET)
Röchling Völklingen	2 – 3	Eintracht Frankfurt
FC Schalke 04	1 – 0	FSV Frankfurt
VfL Osnabrück	3 – 1	Borussia Dortmund	(AET)
FC Bayern Munich	10 – 1	TV Unterboihingen
FC Augsburg	2 – 1	TSV 1860 München
FK Pirmasens	3 – 4	Arminia Bielefeld
1. FC Nürnberg	3 – 2	SV Chio Waldhof
SpVgg Bayreuth	2 – 1	FV Hassia Bingen
MSV Duisburg	4 – 0	SC Fortuna Köln
19 December 1976
DJK Gütersloh	0 – 6	FC 08 Homburg
FC Bayern Munich II	2 – 1	VfB Stuttgart

=== Round of 16 ===
8 January 1977
MSV Duisburg	1 – 2	Hertha BSC
FC Schalke 04	2 – 2	Eintracht Frankfurt	(AET)
1. FC Köln	7 – 2	FC 08 Homburg
Rot-Weiß Essen	2 – 0	Arminia Bielefeld
Bayer Uerdingen	2 – 0	SV Werder Bremen
1. FC Nürnberg	1 – 0	VfL Osnabrück
SpVgg Bayreuth	2 – 0	FC Augsburg

8 January 1977	Bayern Munich	5–3	Bayern Munich II	Munich
	Müller 18', 24', 27', 80'; Künkel 45'		Reisinger 13'; Kirschner 29'; Önal 76'	Stadium: Olympiastadion; Attendance: 6,500; Referee: Herbert Möckel

==== Replay ====
25 January 1977
Eintracht Frankfurt	4 – 3	FC Schalke 04

=== Quarter-finals ===
9 February 1977
1. FC Köln	4 – 2	1. FC Nürnberg
Hertha BSC	4 – 2	FC Bayern Munich	(AET)
Bayer Uerdingen	6 – 3	Eintracht Frankfurt	(AET)
SpVgg Bayreuth	1 – 2	Rot-Weiß Essen

=== Semi-finals ===
7 April 1977
Bayer Uerdingen	0 – 1	Hertha BSC
1. FC Köln	4 – 0	Rot-Weiß Essen

=== Final ===
28 May 1977
17:30 CET

Hertha BSC	1–1 (a.e.t.)	1. FC Köln
Horr 64'	Report	Müller 44'

Niedersachsenstadion, Hanover
Attendance: 54,000
Referee: Rudolf Frickel (Munich)

==== Replay ====
30 May 1977
16:00 CET

Hertha BSC	0–1	1. FC Köln
	Report	Müller 70'

Niedersachsenstadion, Hanover
Attendance: 35,000
Referee: Klaus Ohmsen (Hamburg)
