= 1972–73 Hertha BSC season =

Hertha BSC
1972–73 season
- Owner: Heinz Warneke
- Manager: Fiffi Kronsbein
- Stadium: Olympiastadion
- Bundesliga: 13th place
- DFB-Pokal: Quarter-finals
- 1972–73 DFB-Ligapokal: Group stage
- Top goalscorer: League: Lorenz Horr (12); All: Lorenz Horr (19)
- Highest home attendance: 60,000 (vs. Bayern Munich)
- Lowest home attendance: 7,000 (vs. Schalke)
- Average home league attendance: 22,588
Home colours

The 1972–74 Hertha BSC season was the club's 100th year of existence and season and the 6th season in the top flight of German football. The season began on 16 September 1972 against Fortuna Düsseldorf and finished on 9 June 1973 against 1. FC Kaiserslautern.

== Summary ==
In the 1972–73 season, Hertha BSC, coached by Fiffi Kronsbein, finished the Bundesliga championship in 13th place. In the DFB-Pokal, Hertha Berlin was eliminated in the quarter-finals by SV Werder Bremen. In the Ligapokal, Hertha Berlin was eliminated in the group stage.

== Squad ==
No.	Pos.	Nation	Player
—	GK	GER	Horst Wolter
—	GK	GER	Thomas Zander
—	DF	GER	Holger Bruck
—	DF	GER	Heinz-Peter Buchberger
—	DF	GER	Frank Hanisch
—	DF	GER	Herward Koppenhöfer
—	DF	GER	Ludwig Müller
—	DF	GER	Michael Sziedat
—	DF	GER	Hans Weiner
—	DF	GER	Klaus Walleitner
—	MF	GER	Erich Beer

No.	Pos.	Nation	Player
—	MF	GER	Klaus-Peter Hanisch
—	MF	GER	Erwin Hermandung
—	MF	GER	Johannes Riedl
—	MF	GER	Wolfgang Sidka
—	MF	GER	Gerd Werthmüller
—	FW	RSA	David Goodwin
—	FW	GER	Gerhard Grau
—	FW	GER	Peter Gutzeit
—	FW	GER	Lorenz Horr
—	FW	GER	Manfred Lenz
—	FW	SUI	Kurt Müller

== Staff ==
- Coach: Fiffi Kronsbein
- Assistant Coach: Hans Eder
- Goalkeeping coach:
- Athletic trainers:

== Match Results ==
=== Bundesliga ===
16 September 1972 1	Hertha BSC	2–3	Fortuna Düsseldorf	Olympiastadion, Berlin
15:30 CET	Brück 31'; Sziedat 50'	Report	Budde 2'; Herzog 40'; Hesse 71'	Attendance: 25,000; Referee: Max Klauser (Vaterstetten)

20 September 1972 2	VfL Bochum	2–1	Hertha BSC	Bochum
16:45	Wosab 70'; Walitza 89'		Weiner 57'	Stadium: Stadion an der Castroper Straße; Attendance: 15,000; Referee: Franz Wengenmeyer (Munich)

23 September 1972 3	Hertha BSC	2–5	Kickers Offenbach	Olympiastadion, Berlin
15:30 CET	Gutzeit 23'; Riedl 86'	Report	Hickersberger 36'; Skala 49'; Kostedde 57'; Held 62'; Schäfer 82'	Attendance: 12,000; Referee: Walter Eschweiler (Euskirchen)

30 September 1972 4	Bayern Munich	4–0	Hertha BSC	Olympiastadion, Munich
15:30 CET	Müller 9', 15'; Hoeneß 52'; Beckenbauer 76' (pen.)	Report		Attendance: 40,000; Referee: Rudolf Schröck (Riegelsberg)

4 October 1972 5	Hertha BSC	3–1	Rot-Weiss Oberhausen	Olympiastadion, Berlin
15:30 CET	Horr 33', 66' (pen.); Beer 64'	Report	Wörmer 22'	Attendance: 11,000; Referee: Walter Horstmann (Groß Escherde)

7 October 1972 6	SV Werder Bremen	1–1	Hertha BSC	Weserstadion, Bremen
15:30 CET	Dietrich 9'	Report	Gutzeit 41'	Attendance: 13,000; Referee: Gerd Hennig (Duisburg)

14 October 1972 7	Hertha BSC	3–0	Eintracht Braunschweig	Olympiastadion, Berlin
15:30 CET	Gutzeit 42'; Grau 65'; Hermandung 89'	Report		Attendance: 24,500; Referee: Hans Hillebrand (Essen)

21 October 1972 8	1. FC Köln	4–0	Hertha BSC	Müngersdorfer Stadion, Cologne
15:30 CET	Thielen 40'; Glowacz 63'; Löhr 77'; Overath 89'	Report		Attendance: 8,000; Referee: Rudolf Schröck (Riegelsberg)

28 October 1972 9	Wuppertaler SV	4–1	Hertha BSC	Stadion am Zoo, Wuppertal
15:30 CET	Jung 5', 26', 74'; Pröpper 39'	Report	Brück 68'	Attendance: 17,000; Referee: Gerhard Schulenburg (Hamburg)

1 November 1972 10	Hertha BSC	3–0	FC Schalke 04	Olympiastadion, Berlin
20:00 CET	Beer 7'; Sziedat 13'; Horr 60'	Report		Attendance: 7,000; Referee: Alfons Betz (Regensburg)

4 November 1972 11	Eintracht Frankfurt	2–2	Hertha BSC	Waldstadion, Frankfurt
15:30 CET	Hölzenbein 64'; Kalb 82' (pen.)	Report	Horr 66', 85' (pen.)	Attendance: 7,000; Referee: Walter Eschweiler (Euskirchen)

11 November 1972 12	Hertha BSC	3–1	Borussia Mönchengladbach	Olympiastadion, Berlin
15:30 CET	Hermandung 16'; Sziedat 30'; Weiner 89'	Report	Surau 32'	Attendance: 52,000; Referee: Karl Riegg (Augsburg)

18 November 1972 13	VfB Stuttgart	4–0	Hertha BSC	Neckarstadion, Stuttgart
15:30 CET	Köppel 1'; Schwemmle 32'; Handschuh 54'; Brenninger 75'	Report		Attendance: 9,000; Referee: Wilfried Hilker (Bochum)

21 November 1972 14	Hertha BSC	0–0	MSV Duisburg	Olympiastadion, Berlin
19:30 CET		Report		Attendance: 10,000; Referee: Wolfgang Dittmer (Mutterstadt)

25 November 1972 15	Hamburger SV	4–0	Hertha BSC	Volksparkstadion, Hamburg
15:30 CET	Winkler 17'; Lübeke 75', 80'; Brück 86' (o.g.)	Report		Attendance: 13,000; Referee: Karl-Heinz Fork (Unna-Massen)

2 December 1972 16	Hertha BSC	2–1	Hannover 96	Olympiastadion, Berlin
15:30 CET	Sziedat 29'; Beer 45'	Report	Deterding 61'	Attendance: 12,000; Referee: Rudolf Frickel (Munich)

16 December 1972 17	1. FC Kaiserslautern	2–2	Hertha BSC	Betzenbergstadion, Kaiserslautern
15:30 CET	Ackermann 47'; Bitz 61'	Report	Brück 27'; Horr 80'	Attendance: 6,000; Referee: Gerd Hennig (Duisburg)

20 January 1973 18	Fortuna Düsseldorf	3–1	Hertha BSC	Rheinstadion, Düsseldorf
15:30 CET	Lungwitz 34' (pen.); Biesenkamp 37'; Geye 72'	Report	K. Müller 70'	Attendance: 20,000; Referee: Klaus Ohmsen (Hamburg)

21 April 1973 19	Hertha BSC	2–0	VfL Bochum	Olympiastadion, Berlin
15:30	Müller 41' (pen.); Horr 69'			Attendance: 22,300; Referee: Dietrich Basedow (Hamburg)

3 February 1973 20	Kickers Offenbach	0–0	Hertha BSC	Stadion am Bieberer Berg, Offenbach am Main
15:30 CET		Report		Attendance: 17,000; Referee: Hans Voß (Münster)

10 February 1973 21	Hertha BSC	2–5	Bayern Munich	Olympiastadion, Berlin
15:30 CET	Horr (penalty missed) 12'; Müller 62' (pen.); Müller 78' (pen.)	Report	Müller 25' (pen.); Hoffmann 41', 60'; Zobel 69'; Hoeneß 79'	Attendance: 60,000; Referee: Heinz Quindeau (Ludwigshafen)

17 February 1973 22	Rot-Weiss Oberhausen	2–1	Hertha BSC	Niederrheinstadion, Oberhausen
15:30 CET	Artmann 38'; Jakobs 58'	Report	L. Müller 80' (pen.)	Attendance: 5,000; Referee: Alfons Betz (Regensburg)

24 February 1973 23	Hertha BSC	2–1	SV Werder Bremen	Olympiastadion, Berlin
15:30 CET	Horr 50'; Beer 73'	Report	Laumen 78'	Attendance: 10,000; Referee: Karl-Heinz Fork (Unna-Massen)

10 March 1973 24	Eintracht Braunschweig	2–1	Hertha BSC	Stadion an der Hamburger Straße, Braunschweig
15:30 CET	Erler 24'; Bründl 43'	Report	Beer 32'	Attendance: 13,000; Referee: Gerd Hennig (Duisburg)

17 March 1973 25	Hertha BSC	1–1	1. FC Köln	Olympiastadion, Berlin
15:30 CET	Gutzeit 15'	Report	Löhr 22'	Attendance: 17,000; Referee: Max Klauser (Vaterstetten)

24 March 1973 26	Hertha BSC	0–1	Wuppertaler SV	Olympiastadion, Berlin
15:30 CET		Report	Jung 6'	Attendance: 35,000; Referee: Roth (Salzgitter)

31 March 1973 27	FC Schalke 04	1–1	Hertha BSC	Glückauf-Kampfbahn, Gelsenkirchen
15:30 CET	Beverungen 88'	Report	Hermandung 62'	Attendance: 35,000; Referee: Herbert Lutz (Bremen)

7 April 1973 28	Hertha BSC	3–1	Eintracht Frankfurt	Olympiastadion, Berlin
15:30 CET	Beer 5'; Hermandung 19'; Gutzeit 25'	Report	Parits 10'	Attendance: 17,000; Referee: Walter Eschweiler (Euskirchen)

28 April 1973 29	Borussia Mönchengladbach	2–2	Hertha BSC	Bökelbergstadion, Mönchengladbach
15:30 CET	Vogts 47'; Heynckes 86'	Report	Horr 60'; Beer 81'	Attendance: 14,000; Referee: Alfons Betz (Regensburg)

5 May 1973 30	Hertha BSC	5–1	VfB Stuttgart	Olympiastadion, Berlin
15:30 CET	Beer 12', 82'; Müller 16'; Horr 25', 66'	Report	Köppel 58'	Attendance: 30,000; Referee: Gerhard Schulenburg (Hamburg)

19 May 1973 31	MSV Duisburg	2–1	Hertha BSC	Wedaustadion, Duisburg
15:30 CET	Dietz 28'; Lehmann 64' (rig)	Report	L. Müller 88' (pen.)	Attendance: 5,000; Referee: Karl Riegg (Augsburg)

26 May 1973 32	Hertha BSC	2–1	Hamburger SV	Olympiastadion, Berlin
15:30 CET	K. Müller 31'; Horr 63'	Report	Heese 59'	Attendance: 25,000; Referee: Wilfried Hilker (Bochum)

2 June 1973 33	Hannover 96	2–0	Hertha BSC	Niedersachsenstadion, Hannover
15:30 CET	Denz 1'; Reimann 78'	Report		Attendance: 12,000; Referee: Kurt Tschenscher (Mannheim)

9 June 1973 34	Hertha BSC	4–1	1. FC Kaiserslautern	Olympiastadion, Berlin
15:30 CET	K. Müller 6'; Beer 42'; Hermandung 60'; Brück 89'	Report	Fuchs 73'	Attendance: 14,500; Referee: Manfred Hoppe (Bremerhaven)

=== DFB-Pokal ===
10 December 1972 First round	OSV Hannover	0–6	Hertha BSC	Oststadtstadion. Hannover
CET		Report	Sziedat 8'; Beer 13', 64'; Horr 19', 62' (pen.); Hermandung 51'	Attendance: 2,000; Referee: Gerd Siepe (Attendorn)

20 December 1972 First round	Hertha BSC	3–0	OSV Hannover	Olympiastadion, Berlin
CET	Beer 5'; Sziedat 75'; Grau 84'	Report		Attendance: 2,000; Referee: Karl-Heinz Fork (Unna-Massen)

3 March 1973 Round of 16	MSV Duisburg	1–2	Hertha BSC	Wedaustadion, Duisburg
CET	Seliger 43'	Report	Hermandung 19'; Müller 47'	Attendance: 7,000; Referee: Kurt Tschenscher (Mannheim)

14 March 1973 Round of 16	Hertha BSC	4–2	MSV Duisburg	Olympiastadion, Berlin
CET	Beer 48', 55'; Hanisch 66'; Gutzeit 69'	Report	Hey 78'; Lehmann 88'	Attendance: 7,000; Referee: Jan Redelfs (Hannover)

14 April 1973 Quarter finals	SV Werder Bremen	2–0	Hertha BSC	Weserstadion, Bremen
CET	Buchberger 18' (o.g.); Weist 39'	Report		Attendance: 8,000; Referee: Paul Kindervater (Köln)

17 April 1973 Quarter finals	Hertha BSC	2–2	SV Werder Bremen	Olympiastadion, Berlin
CET	Beer 29', 85'	Report	Neuberger 2'; Görts 66'	Attendance: 12,000; Referee: Gerd Hennig (Duisburg)

=== Ligapokal ===
2 August 1972 Group stage	Wacker 04 Berlin	4–3	Hertha BSC	Poststadion, Berlin
CET	Liedtke 10'; Lunenburg 22', 55'; Sprenger 34'	Report	Horr 25', 68'; Grau 74'	Attendance: 4,000; Referee: Udo Zuchantke (West Berlin)

9 August 1972 Group stage	Hertha BSC	5–1	St. Pauli	Olympiastadion, Berlin
CET	Horr 21' (pen.); Brück 46', 89'; Hanisch 59'; Hermandung 86' (pen.)	Report	Neumann 71'	Attendance: 5,300; Referee: Peter Gabor (Berlin)

12 August 1972 Group stage	Hamburger SV	1–0	Hertha BSC	Volksparkstadion, Hamburg
CET	Winkler 44'	Report		Attendance: 4,500; Referee: Gerhard Schulenburg (Hamburg)

16 August 1972 Group stage	St. Pauli	1–0	Hertha BSC	Wilhelm-Koch-Stadion, Hamburg
CET	Beyer 57'	Report		Attendance: 3,500; Referee: Gerhard Kaiser (Bremen)

19 August 1972 Group stage	Hertha BSC	4–5	Hamburger SV	Olympiastadion, Berlin
CET	Horr 4', 20' (pen.); Gutzeit 17'; Lenz 53'	Report	Winkler 18'; Krause 25', 65', 67'; Zaczyk 58'	Attendance: 5,000; Referee: Hans-Joachim Weyland (Oberhausen)

23 August 1972 Group stage	Hertha BSC	3–1	Wacker 04 Berlin	Olympiastadion, Berlin
CET	Weiner 29', 54'; Lenz 67'	Report	Schwarze 17'	Attendance: 3,200; Referee: Norbert Fuchs (Herdorf)

== Transfers ==
Transfers In
Date	Name	From	Transfer Fee
Summer 1972	(Germany) Holger Brück	(Germany) KSV Hessen Kassel	
Summer 1972	(Germany) Heinz-Peter Buchberger	(Germany) MSV Duisburg	
Summer 1972	(Germany) Gerhard Grau	(Germany) KSV Hessen Kassel	
Summer 1972	(Germany) Klaus-Peter Hanisch	(Germany) Hertha Zehlendorf	
Summer 1972	(Germany) Manfred Lenz	(Germany) SV Alsenborn	
Summer 1972	(Germany) Ludwig Müller	(Germany) Borussia Mönchengladbach	
Summer 1972	(Germany) Johannes Riedl	(Germany) MSV Duisburg	
Summer 1972	(Germany) Hans Weiner	(Germany) Tennis Borussia Berlin	
Summer 1972	(Germany) Gerd Werthmüller	(Germany) 1. FC Saarbrücken	
Summer 1972	(Germany) Horst Wolter	(Germany) Eintracht Braunschweig	
Winter 1973	(Switzerland) Kurt Müller	(Switzerland) Grasshoppers	
		Total Transfer Fees	

Transfer Out
Date	Name	To	Transfer Fee
Winter 1973	(Germany) Klaus Walleitner	(Germany) FC Augsburg	
		Total Transfer Fees	
