= 1973–74 Hertha BSC season =

Hertha BSC
1973–74 season
- Bundesliga: Runners-up
- DFB-Pokal: Round of 16
- Top goalscorer: League: Erwin Hermandung (11); All: Ludwig Müller & Erwin Hermandung (11)
- Highest home attendance: 73,500 (vs. Bayern Munich)
- Lowest home attendance: 5,000 (vs. VfL Bochum)
- Average home league attendance: 27,588
Home colours

The 1973–74 Hertha BSC season was the club's 101st year of existence and season and the 7th season in the top flight of German football. The season started on 11 August 1973 against Hamburger SV and finished on 18 May 1974 against VfL Bochum.

== Summary ==
In the 1973–1974 season, Hertha Berlin, coached by Fiffi Kronsbein and Hans Eder, finished the 1973–74 Bundesliga in 8th place. In the 1973–74 DFB-Pokal, Hertha Berlin was eliminated in the round of 16 by Wattenscheid 09.

== Squad ==
| No. | Pos. | Nation | Player |
|---|---|---|---|
| — | GK | GER | Horst Wolter |
| — | GK | GER | Thomas Zander |
| — | DF | GER | Holger Bruck |
| — | DF | GER | Heinz-Peter Buchberger |
| — | DF | GER | Frank Hanisch |
| — | DF | GER | Herward Koppenhöfer |
| — | DF | GER | Ludwig Müller |
| — | DF | GER | Michael Sziedat |
| — | DF | GER | Hans Weiner |
| — | DF | GER | Klaus Walleitner |
| — | MF | GER | Erich Beer |

| No. | Pos. | Nation | Player |
|---|---|---|---|
| — | MF | GER | Klaus-Peter Hanisch |
| — | MF | GER | Erwin Hermandung |
| — | MF | GER | Johannes Riedl |
| — | MF | GER | Wolfgang Sidka |
| — | MF | GER | Gerd Werthmüller |
| — | FW | GER | Gerhard Grau |
| — | FW | GER | Peter Gutzeit |
| — | FW | GER | Lorenz Horr |
| — | FW | GER | Manfred Lenz |
| — | FW | SUI | Kurt Müller |

== Match Results ==
=== Bundesliga ===
| 11 August 1973 1 | Hamburger SV | 0–2 | Hertha BSC | Volksparkstadion, Hamburg |
| 15:30 CET | | Report | Hermandung 8'; Müller 71' | Attendance: 26,000; Referee: Paul Kindervater (Köln) |

| 18 August 1973 2 | Hertha BSC | 2–2 | Kickers Offenbach | Olympiastadion, Berlin |
| 15:30 CET | K. Müller 38'; L. Müller 65' (pen.) | Report | Hickersberger 31'; Schäfer 81' | Attendance: 42,000; Referee: Gerd Siepe (Attendorn) |

| 29 August 1973 3 | Borussia Monchengladbach | 1–1 | Hertha BSC | Bökelbergstadion, Mönchengladbach |
| 20:00 CET | Danner 38' | Report | Hermandung 58' | Attendance: 28,000; Referee: Max Klauser (Vaterstetten) |

| 25 August 1973 4 | Hertha BSC | 2–2 | Bayern Munich | Olympiastadion, Berlin |
| 15:30 CET | K. Müller 26'; Hermandung 61' | Report | Müller 66'; Dürnberger 74' | Attendance: 73,500; Referee: Hans-Joachim Weyland (Oberhausen) |

| 1 September 1973 5 | Fortuna Köln | 3–3 | Hertha BSC | Radstadion Köln, Cologne |
| 15:30 CET | Mödrath 56'; Kucharski 73', 83' | Report | K. Müller 17'; Beer 34'; Sziedat 38' | Attendance: 15,000; Referee: Ferdinand Biwersi (Bliesransbach) |

| 8 September 1973 6 | Hertha BSC | 1–1 | Rot-Weiss Essen | Olympiastadion, Berlin |
| 15:30 CET | Hermandung 82' | Report | de Vlugt 57' | Attendance: 63,000; Referee: Ottmar Nützel (Neustadt a.d. Aisch) |

| 15 September 1973 7 | Hertha BSC | 2–0 | Fortuna Düsseldorf | Olympiastadion, Berlin |
| 15:30 CET | Hermandung 73'; Gutzeit 77' | Report | | Attendance: 45,000; Referee: Walter Horstmann (Groß Escherde) |

| 22 September 1973 8 | Wuppertaler SV | 2–1 | Hertha BSC | Stadion am Zoo, Wuppertal |
| 15:30 CET | Pröpper 21'; Cremer 30' | Report | Brück 41' | Attendance: 10,000; Referee: Jan Redelfs (Hannover) |

| 29 September 1973 9 | Hertha BSC | 1–0 | FC Schalke 04 | Olympiastadion, Berlin |
| 15:30 CET | Hermandung 72' | Report | | Attendance: 35,000; Referee: Diedrich Basedow (Hamburg) |

| 5 October 1973 10 | Werder Bremen | 4–1 | Hertha BSC | Weserstadion, Bremen |
| 20:00 CET | Schildt 8'; Weist 31', 70'; Kamp 35' | Report | Beer 43' | Attendance: 16,000; Referee: Heinz Nickel (Neustadt a.d. Weinstr.) |

| 17 October 1973 11 | Hertha BSC | 4–2 | Hannover 96 | Olympiastadion, Berlin |
| 15:30 CET | Gutzeit 16'; Hanisch 29'; Beer 56', 71' | Report | 50', 75' Reimann | Attendance: 10,000; Referee: Rainer Waltert (Reimsbach) |

| 20 October 1973 12 | Eintracht Frankfurt | 2–0 | Hertha BSC | Waldstadion, Frankfurt |
| 15:30 CET | Nickel 42', 82' | Report | | Attendance: 17,000; Referee: Hans Hillebrand |

| 27 October 1973 13 | Hertha BSC | 2–2 | 1. FC Köln | O;ympiastadion, Berlin |
| 15:30 CET | Hein 16' (o.g.); Beer 43' | Report | D. Müller 61'; Weber 84' | Attendance: 30,000; Referee: Dieter Dreher (Bickenbach) |

| 2 November 1973 14 | MSV Duisburg | 1–1 | Hertha BSC | Wedaustadion, Duisburg |
| 20:00 CET | Lehmann 39' | Report | Hermandung 17' | Attendance: 19,000; Referee: Ottmar Nützel (Neustadt a.d. Aisch) |

| 10 November 1973 15 | Hertha BSC | 3–1 | 1. FC Kaiserslautern | Olympiastadion, Berlin |
| 15:30 CET | Gutzeit 26', 47'; Horr 90' | Report | Pirrung 61' | Attendance: 15,000; Referee: Karl-Heinz Fork (Unna-Massen) |

| 17 November 1973 16 | VfB Stuttgart | 2–0 | Hertha BSC | Neckarstadion, Stuttgart |
| 15:30 CET | Stickel 53', 79' | Report | | Attendance: 15,000; Referee: Hans-Joachim Weyland (Oberhausen) |

| 11 December 1973 17 | Hertha BSC | 4–2 | VfL Bochum | Olympiastadion, Berlin |
| 20:00 CET | Horr 12', 30'; K. Müller 20'; Gutzeit 48' | Report | Balte 41'; Walitza 88' | Attendance: 5,000; Referee: Karl Riegg (Augsburg) |

| 5 January 1974 18 | Hertha BSC | 2–1 | Hamburger SV | Olympiastadion, Berlin |
| 15:30 CET | Gutzeit 50'; Beer 84' | Report | Bjørnmose 61' | Attendance: 23,000; Referee: Gerd Hennig (Duisburg) |

| 12 January 19 | Kickers Offenbach | 1–1 | Hertha BSC | Stadion am Bieberer Berg, Offenbach am Main |
| 15:30 CET | Hickersberger 45' | Report | Sziedat 62' | Attendance: 14,000; Referee: Karl-Heinz Fork (Unna-Massen) |

| 19 January 1974 20 | Hertha BSC | 3–4 | Borussia Mönchengladbach | Olympiastadion, Munich |
| 15:30 CEST | Hermandung 8'; Horr 54'; Erich Beer 59' | Report | Weiner 2' (o.g.); Vogts 23'; Heynckes 23'; Jensen 52' | Attendance: 30,000; Referee: Gert Meuser (Ingelheim) |

| 26 January 1974 21 | Bayern Munich | 3–1 | Hertha BSC | Munich |
| 15:30 CET | Beckenbauer 36'; Dürnberger 48'; G. Müller 66' | Report | Hermandung 69' | Stadium: Olympiastadion; Attendance: 20,000; Referee: Hans Hillebrand (Essen) |

| 2 February 1974 22 | Hertha BSC | 1–1 | Fortuna Köln | Olympiastadion, Berlin |
| 15:30 CET | L. Müller 39' (pen.) | Report | Struth 34' | Attendance: 18,000; Referee: Dieter Wohlfarth (Bergen-Enkheim) |

| 23 February 1974 23 | Rot-Weiss Essen | 3–2 | Hertha BSC | Georg-Melches-Stadion, Essen |
| 15:30 CET | Erlhoff 10', 23'; Bast 67' | Report | Müller 30' (pen.); Riedl 59' | Attendance: 13,000; Referee: Diedrich Basedow (Hamburg) |

| 2 March 1974 24 | Fortuna Düsseldorf | 1–1 | Hertha BSC | Rheinstadion, Düsseldorf |
| 15:30 CET | Budde 58' | Report | Horr 15' | Attendance: 10,000; Referee: Karl-Heinz Picker (Hamburg) |

| 9 March 1974 25 | Hertha BSC | 3–0 | Wuppertaler SV | Olympiastadion, Berlin |
| 15:30 CET | Riedl 62'; K. Müller 68'; Horr 76' | Report | | Attendance: 15,000; Referee: Gerhard Boe (Uelzen) |

| 16 March 1974 26 | FC Schalke 04 | 3–0 | Hertha BSC | Parkstadion, Gelsenkirchen |
| 15:30 CET | Fischer 27'; Kremers 29'; Rüssmann 41' | Report | | Attendance: 33,500; Referee: Jan Redelfs (Hannover) |

| 23 March 1974 27 | Hertha BSC | 0–0 | Werder Bremen | Olympiastadion, Berlin |
| 15:30 CET | | Report | | Attendance: 16,000; Referee: Gerd Siepe (Attendorn) |

| 30 March 1974 28 | Hannover 96 | 3–1 | Hertha BSC | Niedersachsenstadion, Hannover |
| 15:30 CET | Damjanoff 43'; Höfer 47'; Siemensmeyer 77' (pen.) | Report | Brück 65' | Attendance: 19,000; Referee: Heinz Aldinger (Waiblingen) |

| 6 April 1974 29 | Hertha BSC | 2–1 | Eintracht Frankfurt | Berlin, West Germany |
| 15:30 CEST | Brück 40'; Grau 72' | (Report) | Trinklein 31' | Stadium: Olympiastadion; Attendance: 24,000; Referee: Walter Eschweiler (Euskirchen) |

| 20 April 1974 30 | 1. FC Köln | 3–4 | Hertha BSC | Radstadion Köln, Cologne |
| 15:30 CET | Simmet 22'; D. Müller 58', 90' | Report | K. Müller 11'; Hermandung 32'; Beer 50'; Sziedat 77' | Attendance: 12,700; Referee: Gert Meuser (Ingelheim) |

| 23 April 1974 31 | Hertha BSC | 2–4 | MSV Duisburg | Olympiastadion, Berlin |
| 20:00 CET | K. Müller 17', 50' | Report | Bücker 67'; Linßen 79'; Lehmann 85'; Wunder 90' | Attendance: 14,000; Referee: Rudolf Frickel (Munich) |

| 4 May 1974 32 | 1. FC Kaiserslautern | 3–1 | Hertha BSC | Betzenbergstadion, Kaiserslautern |
| 15:30 CET | Toppmöller 49'; Sandberg 57'; Schwarz 64' | Report | Beer 51' | Attendance: 6,000; Referee: Rainer Waltert (Reimsbach) |

| 11 May 1974 33 | Hertha BSC | 1–0 | VfB Stuttgart | Olympiastadion, Berlin |
| 15:30 CET | Hermandung 71' | Report | | Attendance: 10,000; Referee: Karl-Heinz Fork (Unna-Massen) |

| 18 May 1974 34 | VfL Bochum | 2–1 | Hertha BSC | Stadion an der Castroper Straße, Bochum |
| 15:30 | Walitza 39', 52' | | Horr 87' | Attendance: 8,000; Referee: Herbert Lutz (Bremen) |

=== DFB-Pokal ===
| 1 December 1973 First round | Hertha BSC | 2–2 | Fortuna Düsseldorf | Olympiastadion, Berlin |
| CET | K. Müller 52', 111' | Report | Brei 24'; Köhnen 107' | Attendance: 8,000; Referee: Gerhard Boe (Uelzen) |

| 4 December 1973 First round | Fortuna Düsseldorf | 1–1 (1–4 p) | Hertha BSC | Rheinstadion, Düsseldorf |
| CET | Geye 62' | Report | L. Müller 10' | Attendance: 6,500; Referee: Herbert Lutz (Bremen) |
| | Penalties |
| | Herzog (penalty scored); Abel (penalty missed); Biesenkamp (penalty missed) | | L. Müller (penalty scored); Horr (penalty scored); Sziedat (penalty scored); Beer (penalty scored) |

| 15 December 1973 Round-of-16 | SG Wattenscheid 09 | 1–0 | Hertha BSC | Lohrheidestadion, Bochum |
| CET | Klimke 75' | Report | | Attendance: 12,000; Referee: Gerhard Schulenburg (Hamburg) |

== Transfers ==
Transfers In
| Date | Name | From | Transfer Fee |
|---|---|---|---|
| Summer 1973 | (Germany) Klaus Walleitner | (Germany) Tasmania Berlin | |
| Winter 1974 | (Germany) Herward Koppenhöfer | (Germany) Kickers Offenbach | |
| | | Total Transfer Fees | |

Transfer Out
| Date | Name | To | Transfer Fee |
|---|---|---|---|
| Winter 1973 | (Germany) Klaus Walleitner | (Germany) FC Augsburg | |
| | | Total Transfer Fees | |
