= 1974–75 Hertha BSC season =

Hertha BSC
1974–75 season
- Bundesliga: Runners-up
- DFB-Pokal: Round 1
Home colours

The 1974–75 Hertha BSC season started on 24 August 1974 against Fortuna Düsseldorf and finished on 14 June 1975 against VfL Bochum.

== Match results ==
=== Legend ===
Win Draw Loss

=== Bundesliga ===
Match	Date	Time	Venue	City	Opponent	Result^{1}	Attendance	Hertha BSC goalscorers	Source
1	24 August 1974	15:30	Olympic Stadium	West Berlin	Fortuna Düsseldorf	3–3	30.000	Kliemann 18'; Beer 54'; Müller 90' + 1' (pen.)	
2	31 August 1974		Olympic Stadium	Munich	Bayern Munich	1–2	38.000	Magnusson 83'	
3	11 September 1974	20:00	Olympic Stadium	West Berlin	Kickers Offenbach	4–1	18.000	Kliemann 5'; Brück 52', 76'; Weiner 78'	
4	14 September 1974	15:30	Volksparkstadion	Hamburg	Hamburger SV	1–1	36.000	Sziedat 25'	
5	21 September 1974	15:30	Neckarstadion	Stuttgart	VfB Stuttgart	1–2	15.000	Sidka 39'; Horr 88'	
6	29 September 1974	15:30	Olympic Stadium	West Berlin	1. FC Köln	1–1	45.000	Sidka 5'	
7	5 October 1974	15:30	Stadion am Zoo	Wuppertal	Borussia Wuppertal	0–0	6.800	—	
8	9 October 1974	20:00	Olympic Stadium	West Berlin	Schalke 04	1–0	37.000	Hermandung 54'	
9	12 October 1974	15:30	Eintracht-Stadion	Braunschweig	Eintracht Braunschweig	1–2	24.000	Sziedat 55'	
10	19 October 1974	15:30	Olympic Stadium	West Berlin	Werder Bremen	2–0			
11	2 November 1974	15:30	Bökelbergstadion	Mönchengladbach	Borussia Mönchengladbach	1–1			
12	9 November 1974	15:30	Olympic Stadium	West Berlin	Eintracht Frankfurt	2–1			
13^{2}	16 November 1974	15:30	Olympic Stadium	West Berlin	Tennis Borussia Berlin	3–0	75.000	Grau 53'; Beer 67', 75'	
14	23 November 1974	15:30	Olympic Stadium	West Berlin	1. FC Kaiserslautern	2–1			
15	30 November 1974	14:30	Wedaustadion	Duisburg	MSV Duisburg	3–1	17.000		
16^{3}	14 December 1974	15:30	Stadion an der Castroper Straße	Bochum	VfL Bochum	0–4	18.000	—	
17	21 December 1974	15:30	Olympic Stadium	West Berlin	Rot-Weiss Essen	4–2	30.000	Müller 38', 86'; Grau 59'; Beer 88'	
18	25 January 1975	15:30	Rheinstadion	Düsseldorf	Fortuna Düsseldorf	0–0	13.000	—	
19	1 February 1975	15:30	Olympic Stadium	West Berlin	Bayern Munich	4–1			
20	15 February 1975	15:30	Stadion am Bieberer Berg	Offenbach am Main	Kickers Offenbach	1–3	32.000	Szymanek 29'	
21	22 February 1975	15:30	Olympic Stadium	West Berlin	Hamburger SV	1–0			
22	1 March 1975	15:30	Olympic Stadium	West Berlin	VfB Stuttgart	4–0			
23	8 March 1975	15:30	Radrennbahn Müngersdorf	Cologne	1. FC Köln	1–2			
24	22 March 1975	15:30	Olympic Stadium	West Berlin	Wuppertaler SV	2–0			
25	27 March 1975	20:00	Parkstadion	Gelsenkirchen	FC Schalke 04	0–2			
26	1 April 1975	20:00	Olympic Stadium	West Berlin	Eintracht Braunschweig	3–1			
27	5 April 1975	15:30	Weserstadion	Bremen	Werder Bremen	0–4			
28	19 April 1975	15:30	Olympic Stadium	West Berlin	Borussia Mönchengladbach	2–1			
29	3 May 1975	15:30	Waldstadion	Frankfurt	Eintracht Frankfurt	1–2			
30	10 May 1975	15:30	Olympic Stadium	West Berlin	Tennis Borussia Berlin	2–1			
31	23 May 1975	20:00	Betzenbergstadion	Kaiserslautern	1. FC Kaiserslautern	0–3			
32	30 May 1975	20:00	Olympic Stadium	West Berlin	MSV Duisburg	3–0			
33	7 June 1975	15:30	Georg-Melches-Stadion	Essen	Rot-Weiss Essen	1–2			
34	14 June 1975	15:30	Olympic Stadium	West Berlin	VfL Bochum	4–2			

- 1. Hertha BSC goals first.
- 2. Hertha BSC were thevisiting club despite playing in their home stadium.
- 3. Originally scheduled as the 17th match. The match originally scheduled for 16th Match was rescheduled and played in between the 16th match and 18th match; making it the 17th match.

=== DFB-Pokal ===
7 September 1974 1st Rnd	Eintracht Braunschweig	4–1 (a.e.t.)	Hertha BSC	Braunschweig
	Gersdorff 8', 109'; Grzyb 97'; Bründl 104'	Report	83' Hermandung	Stadium: Eintracht-Stadion; Attendance: 11.000; Referee: Heinz Aldinger

== Squad information ==
=== Squad and statistics ===
As of 22 August 2012

No.	Pos	Nat	Player	Total		Bundesliga		DFB-Pokal	
No.	Pos	Nat	Player	Apps	Goals	Apps	Goals	Apps	Goals
	GK	(Germany) GER	Horst Wolter	1	0	1	0	0	0
	GK	(Germany) GER	Thomas Zander	34	0	34	0	0	0
	DF	(Germany) GER	Holger Brück	25	2	25	2	0	0
	DF	(Germany) GER	Frank Hanisch	1	0	1	0	0	0
	DF	(Germany) GER	Uwe Kliemann	34	7	34	7	0	0
	DF	(Germany) GER	Ludwig Müller	35	3	34	3	1	0
	DF	(Germany) GER	Michael Sziedat	31	3	31	3	0	0
	DF	(Germany) GER	Hans Weiner	33	2	33	2	0	0
	MF	(Germany) GER	Erich Beer	32	11	32	11	0	0
	MF	(Germany) GER	Erwin Hermandung	32	4	32	4	0	0
	MF	(Sweden) SWE	Benno Magnusson	9	1	9	1	0	0
	MF	(Germany) GER	Wolfgang Sidka	30	6	30	6	0	0
	FW	(Germany) GER	Gerhard Grau	34	6	34	6	0	0
	FW	(Germany) GER	Lorenz Horr	34	3	34	3	0	0
	FW	(Switzerland) SUI	Kurt Müller	30	6	30	6	0	0
	FW	(Germany) GER	Detlev Szymanek	14	5	14	5	0	0
	FW	(Germany) GER	Michael Roßbach	0	0	0	0	0	0
	FW	(Germany) GER	Karl-Michael Wohlfahrt	0	0	0	0	0	0
