= 1976–77 Hertha BSC season =

Hertha BSC
1976–77 season
- Stadium: Olympic Stadium, West Berlin, West Germany
- Bundesliga: 10th
- DFB-Pokal: Finalist
Home colours	Away colours

The 1976–77 Hertha BSC season began against Karlsruher SC and finished 21 May 1977 against 1. FC Saarbrücken.

== Match results ==
=== Legend ===
Win	Draw	Loss

=== Bundesliga ===
Match	Date	Venue	Opponent	Result	Attendance	Scorers	Ref.
1							
2							
3							
4							
5							
6							
7							
8							
9							
10							
11							
12							
13							
14							
15							
16							
17							
18							
19							
20							
21							
22							
23							
24							
25							
26							
27							
28							
29							
30							
31							
32							
33							
34							

==== League table ====
Pos	Team	Pld	W	D	L	GF	GA	GD	Pts
8	Borussia Dortmund	34	12	10	12	73	64	+9	34
9	MSV Duisburg	34	11	12	11	60	51	+9	34
10	Hertha BSC	34	13	8	13	55	54	+1	34
11	Werder Bremen	34	13	7	14	51	59	−8	33
12	Fortuna Düsseldorf	34	11	9	14	52	54	−2	31

Source: www.dfb.de
Rules for classification: 1) points; 2) goal difference; 3) number of goals scored.

=== DFB-Pokal ===
Round	Date	Venue	Opponent	Result	Attendance	Scorers	Ref.
1	6 August 1976	Home	TuS Langerwehe	7 – 3	4.000	Hermandung 11', Beer 14', 77', Grau 56', Horr 63', 84', Szymanek 66'	
2	16 October 1976	Home	Bayern Hof	3 – 1	5.500	Kristensen 67', Granitza 27', Beer 86'	
3	18 December 1976	Away	Darmstadt 98	1 – 0 (a.e.t.)	12.000	Gersdorff 98' (pen.)	
R16	8 January 1977	Away	MSV Duisburg	2 – 1	11.000	Beer 24'; Weiner 74'	
QF							
SF							
Final							
Replay							

== Squad ==
=== Squad and statistics ===
As of 31 August 2012

No.	Pos	Nat	Player	Total		Bundesliga		DFB-Pokal	
No.	Pos	Nat	Player	Apps	Goals	Apps	Goals	Apps	Goals
	GK	(Germany) GER	Norbert Nigbur	33	0	33	0	0	0
	GK	(Germany) GER	Horst Wolter	1	0	1	0	0	0
	DF	(Germany) GER	Holger Brück	34	1	34	1	0	0
				0	0	0	0	0	0
	DF	(Germany) GER	Uwe Kliemann	26	3	26	3	0	0
				0	0	0	0	0	0
	DF	(Germany) GER	Michael Sziedat	29	0	29	0	0	0
	DF	(Germany) GER	Hans Weiner	32	0	32	0	0	0
	MF	(Germany) GER	Erich Beer	31	5	31	5	0	0
				0	0	0	0	0	0
				0	0	0	0	0	0
				0	0	0	0	0	0
	MF	(Germany) GER	Erwin Hermandung	33	5	33	5	0	0
				0	0	0	0	0	0
	MF	(Germany) GER	Wolfgang Sidka	30	5	30	5	0	0
				0	0	0	0	0	0
	FW	(Germany) GER	Gerhard Grau	33	3	33	3	0	0
	FW	(Germany) GER	Lorenz Horr	26	6	26	6	0	0
				0	0	0	0	0	0
				0	0	0	0	0	0
