= 1977–78 Eintracht Frankfurt season =

Eintracht Frankfurt
1977–78 season
- Chairman: Achaz von Thümen
- Manager: Gyula Lóránt (resigned 30 November 1977); Dettmar Cramer (signed 8 December 1977)
- Bundesliga: 7th
- DFB-Pokal: Third round
- UEFA Cup: Quarter-finals
- Top goalscorer: League: Bernd Hölzenbein (15); All: Bernd Hölzenbein (27)
- Highest home attendance: 58,000 31 August 1977 v Borussia Mönchengladbach (league)
- Lowest home attendance: 7,500 24 September 1977 v VfL Bochum (league)
- Average home league attendance: 25,971

The 1977–78 Eintracht Frankfurt season was the 78th season in the club's football history. In 1977–78 the club played in the Bundesliga, the top tier of German football. It was the club's 15th season in the Bundesliga.

== Matches ==
=== Legend ===
Win Draw Loss Postponed

=== Friendlies ===
28 June 1977 75th anniversary of SpVgg Griesheim 02	SpVgg Griesheim 02 (West Germany)	0–8	(West Germany) Eintracht Frankfurt	West Germany
		Report	Nickel 6'; Borchers 8', 24'; Stein 13' (o.g.); Weidle 69'; Hans-Dieter Wacker 80'; Krobbach 85'; Grabowski 88'	Attendance: 2,000; Referee: Scheurer

5 July 1977 75th anniversary of Rödelheimer FC 02	Rödelheimer FC 02 (West Germany)	0–6	(West Germany) Eintracht Frankfurt	West Germany
		Report	Wenzel; Hölzenbein	Attendance: 1,500

6 July 1977 Charity match for Kickers Offenbach	Eintracht Frankfurt (West Germany)	3–1	(West Germany) Kickers Offenbach	Frankfurt, West Germany
	Wenzel 13'; Grabowski 17' (pen.) (pen.)	Report	Krause 28' (pen.)	Stadium: Waldstadion; Attendance: 7,000; Referee: Messmer

12 July 1977	Eintracht Wetzlar (West Germany)	0–10	(West Germany) Eintracht Frankfurt	Wetzlar, West Germany
18:00 CET		Report	Grabowski 7' (pen.), 24', 25'; Neuberger 9'; Hölzenbein 31'; Kraus 41'; Stepanović 71'; Beverungen 73', 90'; Krobbach 74'	Stadium: Stadion Wetzlar; Attendance: 4,500; Referee: Keusch

26 July 1977	FSV Frankfurt (West Germany)	1–7	(West Germany) Eintracht Frankfurt	Frankfurt, West Germany
	Posniak 63'	Report	Kraus 3'; Neuberger 13', 55'; Weidle 23'; Wenzel 34'; Killmaier 75' (o.g.); Beverungen 83'	Stadium: Stadion am Bornheimer Hang; Attendance: 5,000; Referee: Boos

2 August 1977	FC Hanau 93 (West Germany)	3–4	(West Germany) Eintracht Frankfurt	Hanau, West Germany
18:00 CET	Goal	Report	Körbel; Hölzenbein; Kraus; Nickel	Stadium: Stadion Wilhelmsbad; Attendance: 6,000

9 August 1977	SV Alsdorf / Daadetaler Sportfreunde XI (West Germany)	1–10	(West Germany) Eintracht Frankfurt	Alsdorf, West Germany
	Goal	Report	Wenzel; Beverungen; Kraus; Stepanović; Nickel; Neuberger	Attendance: 3,000

26 October 1977	FC Neustadt (West Germany)	0–11	(West Germany) Eintracht Frankfurt	Titisee-Neustadt, West Germany
15:30 CET		Report	Hölzenbein; Nickel; Kraus; Borchers	Attendance: 2,000

19 November 1977	FC Augsburg (West Germany)	1–3	(West Germany) Eintracht Frankfurt	West Germany
	Goal	Report	Nickel; Grabowski	Attendance: 1,500

30 December 1977	Würzburger FV (West Germany)	2–2	(West Germany) Eintracht Frankfurt	Würzburg, West Germany
	Sterz 12', 63'	Report	Grabowski 50' (pen.); Nickel 57'	Stadium: Stadion an der Frankfurter Straße; Attendance: 1,400; Referee: Drescher

13 April 1978	Waldhof Mannheim (West Germany)	2–3	(West Germany) Eintracht Frankfurt	West Germany
	Böhni; Vogel	Report	Wenzel; Nickel; Trapp	Attendance: 1,500

14 April 1978	Freiburger FC (West Germany)	2–1	(West Germany) Eintracht Frankfurt	West Germany
	Derigs 17'; Hug 80'	Report	Nickel 26'	Attendance: 3,000; Referee: Binninger

16 April 1978	Wormatia Worms (West Germany)	0–0	(West Germany) Eintracht Frankfurt	Worms, West Germany
		Report		Attendance: 700; Referee: Föckler

5 May 1978	Eintracht Frankfurt (West Germany)	2–2	Mexico	Kassel, West Germany
	Nickel; Grabowski	Report	Goal	Attendance: 12,000

12 May 1978	Eintracht Frankfurt (West Germany)	1–1	(Netherlands) AFC Ajax	Offenbach, West Germany
	Wenzel 76'	Report	Schoenaker 11'	Stadium: Stadion am Bieberer Berg; Attendance: 5,000; Referee: Linn

16 May 1978	SSV Dillenburg (West Germany)	3–1	(West Germany) Eintracht Frankfurt	West Germany
	Beck 14'; Engelhardt 38'; Köhler 57'	Report	Wenzel 72'	Attendance: 1,500

18 May 1978	Hassia Bingen (West Germany)	3–3	(West Germany) Eintracht Frankfurt	West Germany
	Kaminzke 39'; Albert 59'; Keller 63'	Report	Wenzel 50', 88'; Nachtweih 60'	Attendance: 1,200; Referee: Paulus

21 May 1978 75th anniversary of SpVgg Neu-Isenburg	SpVgg Neu-Isenburg (West Germany)	0–16	(West Germany) Eintracht Frankfurt	Neu-Isenburg, West Germany
12:00 CET		Report	Weidle 6', 24'; Grabowski 28', 37', 45', 71'; H Müller 33'; Kraus 35', 59', 73'; Skala 53', 85'; Wenzel 57', 68'; Stepanović 84'; Körbel 89'	Stadium: Sportparkstadion Neu-Isenburg; Attendance: 3,000

25 May 1978	Austria	2–0	(West Germany) Eintracht Frankfurt	Linz, Austria
	Kreuz 16'; Prohaska 76'	Report		Stadium: Linzer Stadion; Attendance: 16,000

=== Bundesliga ===
==== League fixtures and results ====
6 August 1977 1	Eintracht Frankfurt	4–0	1. FC Saarbrücken	Frankfurt, West Germany
15:30 CET	Nickel 40', 42', 69'; Trinklein 71'	Report		Stadium: Waldstadion; Attendance: 21,000; Referee: Horstmann

12 August 1977 2	FC Schalke 04	3–2	Eintracht Frankfurt	Gelsenkirchen, West Germany
20:00 CET	Fischer 25'; H Kremers 29', 86'	Report	Wenzel 57'; Grabowski 65'	Stadium: Parkstadion; Attendance: 58,000; Referee: Ohmsen

17 August 1977 3	Eintracht Frankfurt	0–2	Hamburger SV	Frankfurt, West Germany
20:00 CET		Report	Magath 77'; Volkert 90'	Stadium: Waldstadion; Attendance: 55,000; Referee: Engel

27 August 1977 4	Borussia Dortmund	0–2	Eintracht Frankfurt	Dortmund, West Germany
15:30 CET		Report	Wenzel 24', 42'	Stadium: Westfalenstadion; Attendance: 40,000; Referee: Biwersi

31 August 1977 5	Eintracht Frankfurt	4–2	Borussia Mönchengladbach	Frankfurt, West Germany
20:00 CET	Hölzenbein 38', 55'; Nickel 51' (pen.); Wenzel 70'	Report	Heynckes 3'; Nielsen 76'	Stadium: Waldstadion; Attendance: 58,000; Referee: Jensen

3 September 1977 6	Hertha BSC	2–0	Eintracht Frankfurt	Berlin, West Germany
15:30 CET	Granitza 43'; Nüssing 85'	Report		Stadium: Olympiastadion; Attendance: 27,000; Referee: Hennig

9 September 1977 7	Eintracht Frankfurt	3–1	MSV Duisburg	Frankfurt, West Germany
20:00 CET	Wenzel 6'; Stepanović 18'; Jakobs 71' (o.g.)	Report	Jara 40'	Stadium: Waldstadion; Attendance: 20,000; Referee: Linn

17 September 1977 8	TSV 1860 Munich	2–4	Eintracht Frankfurt	Munich, West Germany
15:30 CET	Hartwig 71'; Haunstein 89'	Report	Wenzel 20', 35'; Kraus 53'; Hölzenbein 67'	Stadium: Olympiastadion; Attendance: 35,000; Referee: Hontheim

24 September 1977 9	VfL Bochum	0–1	Eintracht Frankfurt	Bochum, West Germany
15:30 CET		Report	Wenzel 58'	Stadium: Ruhrstadion; Attendance: 23,000; Referee: Niemann

1 October 1977 10	Eintracht Frankfurt	1–3	1. FC Kaiserslautern	Frankfurt, West Germany
15:30 CET	Hölzenbein 71' (pen.)	Report	Wendt 61'; Riedl 88'; Pirrung 90'	Stadium: Waldstadion; Attendance: 30,000; Referee: Ahlenfelder

12 October 1977 11	VfB Stuttgart	2–1	Eintracht Frankfurt	Stuttgart, West Germany
20:00 CET	Ohlicher 48', 66'	Report	Neuberger 27'	Stadium: Neckarstadion; Attendance: 68,000; Referee: Kindervater

22 October 1977 12	Eintracht Frankfurt	5–2	FC St. Pauli	Frankfurt, West Germany
15:30 CET	Hölzenbein 11', 67'; Kraus 43'; Nickel 49'; Grabowski 87'	Report	Gerber 7'; Box 80'	Stadium: Waldstadion; Attendance: 12,000; Referee: Burgers

29 October 1977 13	Fortuna Düsseldorf	2–1	Eintracht Frankfurt	Düsseldorf, West Germany
15:30 CET	Zimmermann 1', 84'	Report	Grabowski 13'	Stadium: Rheinstadion; Attendance: 19,000; Referee: Roth

5 November 1977 14	Eintracht Frankfurt	2–2	1. FC Köln	Frankfurt, West Germany
15:30 CET	Grabowski 24'; Hölzenbein 36'	Report	D Müller 19'; Flohe 60'	Stadium: Waldstadion; Attendance: 40,000; Referee: Gabor

12 November 1977 15	Werder Bremen	3–0	Eintracht Frankfurt	Bremen, West Germany
15:30 CET	Røntved 17'; Bracht 34'; Röber 46' (pen.)	Report		Stadium: Weserstadion; Attendance: 18,000; Referee: Stäglich

26 November 1977 16	Eintracht Frankfurt	4–0	Bayern Munich	Frankfurt, West Germany
15:30 CET	Hölzenbein 4'; Wenzel 38'; Kraus 56'; Grabowski 75'	Report		Stadium: Waldstadion; Attendance: 43,000; Referee: Waltert

3 December 1977 17	Eintracht Braunschweig	1–1	Eintracht Frankfurt	Braunschweig, West Germany
15:30 CET	Lübeke 28'	Report	Grabowski 37'	Stadium: Eintracht-Stadion; Attendance: 15,000; Referee: Eschweiler

10 December 1977 18	1. FC Saarbrücken	0–0	Eintracht Frankfurt	Saarbrücken, West Germany
15:30 CET		Report		Stadium: Ludwigsparkstadion; Attendance: 20,000; Referee: Horstmann

17 December 1977 19	Eintracht Frankfurt	3–0	FC Schalke 04	Frankfurt, West Germany
15:30 CET	Hölzenbein 32'; Wenzel 73'; Grabowski 78'	Report		Stadium: Waldstadion; Attendance: 30,000; Referee: Engel

7 January 1978 20	Hamburger SV	0–0	Eintracht Frankfurt	Hamburg, West Germany
15:30 CET		Report	Kraus (red card) 41'	Stadium: Volksparkstadion; Attendance: 32,000; Referee: Burgers

14 January 1978 21	Eintracht Frankfurt	2–1	Borussia Dortmund	Frankfurt, West Germany
15:30 CET	Wenzel 65'; Nickel 80'	Report	Burgsmüller 23'	Stadium: Waldstadion; Attendance: 25,000; Referee: Glasneck

21 January 1978 22	Borussia Mönchengladbach	2–0	Eintracht Frankfurt	Mönchengladbach, West Germany
15:30 CET	Wohlers 55'; Lienen 80'	Report		Stadium: Bökelbergstadion; Attendance: 19,000; Referee: Linn

28 January 1978 23	Eintracht Frankfurt	0–5	Hertha BSC	Frankfurt, West Germany
15:30 CET		Report	Weiner 36'; Kristensen 53'; Gersdorff 56', 70'; Brück 78' (pen.)	Stadium: Waldstadion; Attendance: 18,000; Referee: Redelfs

4 February 1978 24	MSV Duisburg	3–0	Eintracht Frankfurt	Duisburg, West Germany
15:30 CET	Worm 9', 89'; Bücker 77' (pen.)	Report		Stadium: Wedaustadion; Attendance: 8,000; Referee: Luca

11 February 1978 25	Eintracht Frankfurt	1–0	TSV 1860 Munich	Frankfurt, West Germany
15:30 CET	Hölzenbein 4'	Report		Stadium: Waldstadion; Attendance: 12,000; Referee: Niemann

18 February 1978 26	Eintracht Frankfurt	5–3	VfL Bochum	Frankfurt, West Germany
15:30 CET	Nickel 10', 69' (pen.); Hölzenbein 32', 42'; Neuberger 86'	Report	Abel 16'; Bast 26'; Herget 82'	Stadium: Waldstadion; Attendance: 7,500; Referee: Hontheim

4 March 1978 28	Eintracht Frankfurt	2–0	VfB Stuttgart	Frankfurt, West Germany
15:30 CET	Wenzel 84'; Grabowski 89'	Report		Stadium: Waldstadion; Attendance: 33,000; Referee: Klauser

11 March 1978 29	FC St. Pauli	5–3	Eintracht Frankfurt	Hamburg, West Germany
15:30 CET	Beverungen 5'; Sturz 45', 73'; Oswald 77'; Gerber 81'	Report	Reichel 36'; Borchers 44'; Grabowski 55'	Stadium: Wilhelm-Koch-Stadion; Attendance: 5,000; Referee: Ahlenfelder

18 March 1978 30	Eintracht Frankfurt	4–0	Fortuna Düsseldorf	Frankfurt, West Germany
15:30 CET	Nickel 24'; Hölzenbein 45'; Wenzel 64', 67'	Report		Stadium: Waldstadion; Attendance: 11,000; Referee: Engel

25 March 1978 27	1. FC Kaiserslautern	2–0	Eintracht Frankfurt	Kaiserslautern, West Germany
15:30 CET	Wendt 10'; Toppmöller 53'	Report		Stadium: Betzenbergstadion; Attendance: 25,000; Referee: Risse

1 April 1978 31	1. FC Köln	0–1	Eintracht Frankfurt	Cologne, West Germany
15:30 CET		Report	Hölzenbein 69'	Stadium: Müngersdorfer Stadion; Attendance: 42,000; Referee: Roth

8 April 1978 32	Eintracht Frankfurt	0–2	Werder Bremen	Frankfurt, West Germany
15:30 CET		Report	Röber 43'; Dreßel 90'	Stadium: Waldstadion; Attendance: 12,000; Referee: Eschweiler

22 April 1978 33	Bayern Munich	2–1	Eintracht Frankfurt	Munich, West Germany
15:30 CET	Hoeneß 11'; G Müller 81' (pen.)	Report	Nickel 18'	Stadium: Olympiastadion; Attendance: 20,000; Referee: Kindervater

29 April 1978 34	Eintracht Frankfurt	2–0	Eintracht Braunschweig	Frankfurt, West Germany
15:30 CET	Hölzenbein 14'; Nickel 28'	Report		Stadium: Waldstadion; Attendance: 14,000; Referee: Stäglich

==== League table ====
Pos	Team	Pld	W	D	L	GF	GA	GD	Pts	Qualification or relegation
5	Fortuna Düsseldorf	34	15	9	10	49	36	+13	39	Qualification to Cup Winners' Cup first round (Note: As 1. FC Köln also won the DFB-Pokal, the Cup Winners' Cup spot was given to runners-up Fortuna Düsseldorf, while Düsseldorf's original UEFA Cup was transferred to MSV Duisburg.)
6	MSV Duisburg	34	15	7	12	62	59	+3	37	Qualification to UEFA Cup first round
7	Eintracht Frankfurt	34	16	4	14	59	52	+7	36	
8	1. FC Kaiserslautern	34	16	4	14	64	63	+1	36	
9	Schalke 04	34	14	6	14	47	52	−5	34	

Source: www.dfb.de
Rules for classification: 1) points; 2) goal difference; 3) number of goals scored.

==== Results summary ====
Overall								Home						Away					
Pld	W	D	L	GF	GA	GD	Pts	W	D	L	GF	GA	GD	W	D	L	GF	GA	GD
34	16	4	14	59	52	+7	36	12	1	4	42	23	+19	4	3	10	17	29	−12

Source: Bundesliga

==== Results by round ====
Round	1	2	3	4	5	6	7	8	9	10	11	12	13	14	15	16	17	18	19	20	21	22	23	24	25	26	27	28	29	30	31	32	33	34
Ground	H	A	H	A	H	A	H	A	A	H	A	H	A	H	A	H	A	A	H	A	H	A	H	A	H	H	A	H	A	H	A	H	A	H
Result	W	L	L	L	W	L	W	W	W	L	L	W	L	D	L	W	D	D	W	D	W	L	L	W	W	W	L	W	L	W	W	L	L	W
Position	2	6	13	7	4	10	5	2	2	5	7	4	6	8	11	8	7	7	6	6	4	7	9	10	8	7	9	8	8	7	6	6	7	7

A = Away; H = Home; W = Win; D = Draw; L = Loss

=== DFB-Pokal ===
30 July 1977 1st Round	FC Konstanz	1–6	Eintracht Frankfurt	West Germany
	Beck 78'	Report	Kraus 5', 33'; Schaffner 14' (o.g.); Nickel 16'; Grabowski 45'; Wenzel 58'	Attendance: 7,500; Referee: Aldinger

20 August 1977 2nd Round	TuS Schloß Neuhaus	2–2	Eintracht Frankfurt	Paderborn, West Germany
	Schulte 6'; Fiege 35'	Report	Wenzel 62'; Neuberger 67'	Stadium: Inselbadstadion; Attendance: 10,000; Referee: Glasneck

24 August 1977 2nd Round (Rematch)	Eintracht Frankfurt	4–0	TuS Schloß Neuhaus	Frankfurt, West Germany
	Hölzenbein 31'; Grabowski 50'; Nickel 70'; Kraus 83'	Report		Stadium: Waldstadion; Attendance: 8,000; Referee: Föckler

15 October 1977 3rd Round	FC Schalke 04	1–0	Eintracht Frankfurt	Gelsenkirchen, West Germany
	Klaus Fischer 82'	Report		Stadium: Parkstadion; Attendance: 35,000; Referee: Hoffmann

=== Intertoto Cup ===
==== Matches ====
25 June 1977 1	Eintracht Frankfurt (West Germany)	2–2	(Czechoslovak Socialist Republic) Inter Bratislava	Frankfurt, West Germany
	Nickel 44'; Beverungen 58'	Report	Brezík 25'; Mráz 49'	Stadium: Waldstadion; Attendance: 4,000; Referee: Linn

2 July 1977 2	SSW Innsbruck (Austria)	1–1	(West Germany) Eintracht Frankfurt	Innsbruck, Austria
	Šikić 7'	Report	Stering 53' (o.g.)	Stadium: Tivoli; Attendance: 15,000; Referee: Latzin

9 July 1977 3	Eintracht Frankfurt (West Germany)	4–1	(Switzerland) FC Zürich	Frankfurt, West Germany
	Hölzenbein 26', 80'; Kraus 65'; Neuberger 86'	Eintracht summary FCZ summary	Torstensson 56'	Stadium: Waldstadion; Attendance: 5,500; Referee: Aldinger

16 July 1977 4	Eintracht Frankfurt (West Germany)	1–1	(Austria) SSW Innsbruck	Frankfurt, West Germany
	Hölzenbein 12' (pen.)	Report	Welzl 9'	Stadium: Waldstadion; Attendance: 5,000; Referee: Dreher

20 July 1977 5	FC Zürich (Switzerland)	1–0	(West Germany) Eintracht Frankfurt	Zurich, Switzerland
	Cucinotta 10'	Eintracht summary FCZ summary		Stadium: Letzigrund; Attendance: 3,500; Referee: Dörflinger

23 July 1977 6	Inter Bratislava (Czechoslovak Socialist Republic)	2–5	(West Germany) Eintracht Frankfurt	Bratislava, Czechoslovakia
	Hudec 63'; Šimončič 88'	Report	Wenzel 7', 11'; Hölzenbein 44', 78', 83'	Attendance: 5,000; Referee: Jarsa

==== Table ====
Pos	Team	Pld	W	D	L	GF	GA	GD	Pts	BRA	EIN	WAC	ZÜR
1	(Czechoslovakia) Inter Bratislava	6	4	1	1	18	11	+7	9	—	2–5	4–2	5–0
2	(West Germany) Eintracht Frankfurt	6	2	3	1	13	8	+5	7	2–2	—	1–1	4–1
3	(Austria) SSW Innsbruck	6	2	2	2	10	10	0	6	1–3	1–1	—	3–0
4	(Switzerland) Zürich	6	1	0	5	4	16	−12	2	1–2	1–0	1–2	—

Source: mogiel.net
Rules for classification: 1) Points; 2) Goal difference; 3) Goals scored; 4) Head-to-head points; 5) Away goals scored; 6) Draw.

=== UEFA Cup ===
13 September 1977 1st Round	Eintracht Frankfurt (West Germany)	5–0	(Malta) Sliema Wanderers	Frankfurt, West Germany
	Nickel 19', 35'; Wenzel 21'; Kraus 58'; Grabowski 78'	Report		Stadium: Waldstadion; Attendance: 6,000; Referee: Środecki

13 September 1977 1st Round	Sliema Wanderers (Malta)	0–0	(West Germany) Eintracht Frankfurt	Ta' Qali, Malta
		Report		Stadium: Ta' Qali Stadium; Attendance: 3,000; Referee: Ciacci

19 October 1977 2nd Round	FC Zürich (Switzerland)	0–3	(West Germany) Eintracht Frankfurt	Zurich, Switzerland
		Report	Hölzenbein 28'; Wenzel 77'; Grabowski 90'	Stadium: Letzigrund; Attendance: 17,000; Referee: Christov

2 November 1977 2nd Round	Eintracht Frankfurt (West Germany)	4–3	(Switzerland) FC Zürich	Frankfurt, West Germany
	Kraus 1'; Grabowski 62'; Stepanović 68'; Krobbach 87'		Risi 45' (pen.), 60'; Torstensson 82'	Attendance: 3,000; Referee: Ivanov

23 November 1977 3rd Round	Eintracht Frankfurt (West Germany)	4–0	(West Germany) Bayern Munich	Frankfurt, West Germany
	Grabowski 23'; Hölzenbein 37'; Kraus 66'; Skala 67'	Report		Stadium: Waldstadion; Attendance: 26,000; Referee: Rainea

7 December 1977 3rd Round	Bayern Munich (West Germany)	1–2	(West Germany) Eintracht Frankfurt	Munich, West Germany
	Rummennigge 3'	Report	Wenzel 83'; Hölzenbein 86'	Stadium: Olympiastadion; Attendance: 13,000; Referee: Gussoni

1 March 1978 Quarter-finals	Eintracht Frankfurt (West Germany)	3–2	(Switzerland) Grasshopper Club Zürich	Frankfurt, West Germany
20:00 CET	Kraus 58'; Hölzenbein 68', 91' (pen.)	Report	Bosco 36'; Ponte 52' (pen.)	Stadium: Waldstadion; Attendance: 14,000; Referee: Linemayr

14 March 1978 Quarter-finals	Grasshopper Club Zürich (Switzerland)	1–0	(West Germany) Eintracht Frankfurt	Zurich, Switzerland
20:00 CET	Ponte 33' (pen.)	Report		Stadium: Hardturm; Attendance: 30,000; Referee: Maksimović

== Squad ==
=== Squad and statistics ===
No.	Pos	Nat	Player	Total		Bundesliga		DFB-Pokal		UEFA Cup		Intertoto Cup	
No.	Pos	Nat	Player	Apps	Goals	Apps	Goals	Apps	Goals	Apps	Goals	Apps	Goals
	GK	(West Germany) FRG	Heinz-Josef Koitka	50	0	34	0	4	0	8	0	4	0
	GK	(East Germany) GDR	Jürgen Pahl	0	0	0	0	0	0	0	0	0	0
	GK	(West Germany) FRG	Günter Wienhold	2	0	0	0	0	0	0	0	2	0
	DF	(West Germany) FRG	Charly Körbel	42	0	29	0	3	0	5	0	5	0
	DF	(West Germany) FRG	Peter Krobbach	21	1	14	0	0	0	5	1	2	0
	DF	(West Germany) FRG	Helmut Müller	19	0	14	0	0	0	3	0	2	0
	DF	(West Germany) FRG	Willi Neuberger	51	4	34	2	4	1	7	0	6	1
	DF	(West Germany) FRG	Peter Reichel	42	1	27	1	4	0	6	0	5	0
	DF	(West Germany) FRG	Gerd Simons	1	0	0	0	0	0	0	0	1	0
	DF	(West Germany) FRG	Lothar Skala	17	1	8	0	3	0	5	1	1	0
	DF	(Socialist Federal Republic of Yugoslavia) YUG	Dragoslav Stepanović	41	2	29	1	3	0	6	1	3	0
	DF	(West Germany) FRG	Gert Trinklein	23	1	13	1	3	0	2	0	5	0
	DF	(West Germany) FRG	Roland Weidle	44	0	30	0	3	0	6	0	5	0
	MF	(West Germany) FRG	Jürgen Grabowski	50	14	34	9	4	2	8	3	4	0
	MF	(West Germany) FRG	Wolfgang Kraus	27	3	27	3	0	0	0	0	0	0
	MF	(East Germany) GDR	Norbert Nachtweih	5	0	5	0	0	0	0	0	0	0
	MF	(West Germany) FRG	Bernd Nickel	51	16	34	11	4	2	7	2	6	1
	MF	(West Germany) FRG	Wolfgang Trapp	9	0	2	0	1	0	4	0	2	0
	MF	(West Germany) FRG	Hans-Dieter Wacker	2	0	0	0	0	0	0	0	2	0
	FW	(West Germany) FRG	Klaus Beverungen	2	0	0	0	0	0	0	0	2	0
	FW	(West Germany) FRG	Egon Bihn	5	0	3	0	0	0	2	0	0	0
	FW	(West Germany) FRG	Ronny Borchers	8	1	6	1	0	0	1	0	1	0
	FW	(West Germany) FRG	Bernd Hölzenbein	51	27	34	15	4	1	8	5	5	6
	FW	(West Germany) FRG	Rüdiger Wenzel	48	23	34	14	4	3	6	4	4	2

=== Transfers ===
In:

No.	Pos.	Nation	Player
—	MF	GDR	Norbert Nachtweih (from Hallescher FC Chemie, after expiration of FIFA ban following a defection)
—	GK	GDR	Jürgen Pahl (from Hallescher FC Chemie, after expiration of FIFA ban following a defection)
—	DF	FRG	Lothar Skala (from Kickers Offenbach)
—	MF	FRG	Wolfgang Trapp (from Eintracht Frankfurt academy)
—	MF	FRG	Hans-Dieter Wacker (from Eintracht Frankfurt academy)

Out:

No.	Pos.	Nation	Player
—	FW	FRG	Klaus Beverungen (to FC St. Pauli)
—	DF	FRG	Rainer Dörr (to FC Augsburg)

== Sources ==
- Matheja, Ulrich (2011). Unsere Eintracht - Eintracht Frankfurt - Die Chronik. Die Werkstatt. ISBN 978-3-89533-750-5.
