= 1979 DFB-Pokal final =

- Match programme cover
- Event: 1978–79 DFB-Pokal
Hertha BSC	Fortuna Düsseldorf
0	1
- After extra time
- Date: 23 June 1979
- Venue: Niedersachsenstadion, Hanover
- Referee: Günter Linn (Altendiez)
- Attendance: 56,000

The 1979 DFB-Pokal final decided the winner of the 1978–79 DFB-Pokal, the 36th season of Germany's knockout football cup competition. It was played on 23 June 1979 at the Niedersachsenstadion in Hanover. Fortuna Düsseldorf won the match 1–0 against Hertha BSC after extra time, to claim their 1st cup title.

== Route to the final ==
The DFB-Pokal began with 128 teams in a single-elimination knockout cup competition. There were a total of six rounds leading up to the final. Teams were drawn against each other, and the winner after 90 minutes would advance. If still tied, 30 minutes of extra time was played. If the score was still level, a replay would take place at the original away team's stadium. If still level after 90 minutes, 30 minutes of extra time was played. If the score was still level, a penalty shoot-out was used to determine the winner.

Note: In all results below, the score of the finalist is given first (H: home; A: away).

Hertha BSC		Round	Fortuna Düsseldorf
Opponent	Result	1978–79 DFB-Pokal	Opponent	Result
FV 04 Würzburg (A)	2–0 (a.e.t.)	Round 1	Stuttgarter Kickers (H)	7–2
Wormatia Worms (A) (H)	1–1 (a.e.t.); 2–0 (replay)	Round 2	VfR Heilbronn (H)	3–0
Borussia Mönchengladbach (H)	2–0	Round 3	Alemannia Aachen (H)	2–1
1. FC Köln (H)	2–0 (a.e.t.)	Round of 16	MSV Duisburg (A)	1–0
Bayer Uerdingen (H)	6–0	Quarter-finals	Bayer Leverkusen (H)	2–1
Eintracht Frankfurt (H)	2–1	Semi-finals	1. FC Nürnberg (H)	4–1 (a.e.t.)

== Match ==
=== Details ===
23 June 1979
16:00 CET

Hertha BSC	0–1 (a.e.t.)	Fortuna Düsseldorf
	Report	Seel 116'

Niedersachsenstadion, Hanover
Attendance: 56,000
Referee: Günter Linn (Altendiez)

Hertha BSC	Fortuna Düsseldorf

GK	1	(West Germany) Norbert Nigbur
RB		(West Germany) Michael Sziedat
CB		(West Germany) Uwe Kliemann (c)
CB		(West Germany) Hans Weiner
LB		(Denmark) Ole Rasmussen
RM		(West Germany) Holger Brück
CM		(West Germany) Wolfgang Sidka
CM		(West Germany) Dieter Nüssing
LM		(West Germany) Erich Beer
CF		(West Germany) Jürgen Milewski	Booked	(substituted off) 72'
CF		(West Germany) Dietmar Krämer		(substituted off) 91'
Substitutes:
FW		(Denmark) Henrik Agerbeck		(substituted on) 72'
FW		(West Germany) Thomas Remark		(substituted on) 91'
Manager:
(West Germany) Kuno Klötzer

GK	1	(West Germany) Jörg Daniel
RB	2	(West Germany) Josef Weikl
CB	3	(West Germany) Gerd Zewe (c)
CB	6	(West Germany) Reinhold Fanz
LB	5	(West Germany) Heiner Baltes
RM	4	(West Germany) Egon Köhnen
CM	7	(West Germany) Hubert Schmitz
CM	9	(West Germany) Rudi Bommer
LM	8	(West Germany) Thomas Allofs	(substituted off) 72'
CF	10	(West Germany) Klaus Allofs
CF	11	(West Germany) Wolfgang Seel
Substitutes:
MF		(West Germany) Ralf Dusend	(substituted on) 72'
Manager:
(West Germany) Hans-Dieter Tippenhauer

Match rules

- 90 minutes.
- 30 minutes of extra time if necessary.
- Penalty shoot-out if scores still level.
- Maximum of two substitutions.
