= 1976 DFB-Pokal final =

- Match programme cover
- Event: 1975–76 DFB-Pokal
Hamburger SV	1. FC Kaiserslautern
2	0
- Date: 26 June 1976
- Venue: Waldstadion, Frankfurt
- Referee: Walter Eschweiler (Euskirchen)
- Attendance: 61,000

The 1976 DFB-Pokal final decided the winner of the 1975–76 DFB-Pokal, the 33rd season of Germany's knockout football cup competition. It was played on 26 June 1976 at the Waldstadion in Frankfurt. Hamburger SV won the match 2–0 against 1. FC Kaiserslautern, to claim their 2nd cup title.

== Route to the final ==
The DFB-Pokal began with 128 teams in a single-elimination knockout cup competition. There were a total of six rounds leading up to the final. Teams were drawn against each other, and the winner after 90 minutes would advance. If still tied, 30 minutes of extra time was played. If the score was still level, a replay would take place at the original away team's stadium. If still level after 90 minutes, 30 minutes of extra time was played. If the score was still level, a penalty shoot-out was used to determine the winner.

Note: In all results below, the score of the finalist is given first (H: home; A: away).

Hamburger SV		Round	1. FC Kaiserslautern
Opponent	Result	1975–76 DFB-Pokal	Opponent	Result
1. FC Köln Amateure (H)	4–0	Round 1	VfR Mannheim (H)	2–0
Union Salzgitter (H)	4–0	Round 2	Blumenthaler SV (A)	5–1
SC Jülich (H)	4–0	Round 3	Westfalia Herne (A)	3–1
Bayern Hof (A)	2–0	Round of 16	Eintracht Braunschweig (H)	2–0
FC 08 Homburg (A)	2–1	Quarter-finals	Fortuna Düsseldorf (H)	3–0
Bayern Munich (H) (A)	2–2 (a.e.t.); 1–0 (replay)	Semi-finals	Hertha BSC (H)	4–2

== Match ==
=== Details ===
26 June 1976
16:00 CET

Hamburger SV	2–0	1. FC Kaiserslautern
Nogly 22'; Bjørnmose 37'	Report

Waldstadion, Frankfurt
Attendance: 61,000
Referee: Walter Eschweiler (Euskirchen)

Hamburger SV	1. FC Kaiserslautern

GK	1	(West Germany) Rudi Kargus
RB		(West Germany) Manfred Kaltz
CB		(West Germany) Horst Blankenburg
CB		(West Germany) Peter Nogly (c)
LB		(West Germany) Peter Hidien
CM		(West Germany) Klaus Zaczyk		(substituted off) 62'
CM		(West Germany) Caspar Memering
CM		(West Germany) Kurt Eigl
RW		(West Germany) Willi Reimann	Booked
CF		(Denmark) Ole Bjørnmose
LW		(West Germany) Georg Volkert
Substitutes:
FW		(West Germany) Hans-Jürgen Sperlich		(substituted on) 62'
Manager:
(West Germany) Kuno Klötzer

GK	1	(Sweden) Ronnie Hellström
RB		(West Germany) Hans-Günther Kroth
CB		(West Germany) Werner Melzer
CB		(West Germany) Ernst Diehl (c)
LB		(West Germany) Walter Frosch
RM		(West Germany) Reinhard Meier
CM		(West Germany) Klaus Scheer
CM		(West Germany) Heinz Stickel	(substituted off) 66'
LM		(West Germany) Johannes Riedl
CF		(West Germany) Josef Pirrung	(substituted off) 62'
CF		(Sweden) Roland Sandberg
Substitutes:
DF		(West Germany) Peter Schwarz	(substituted on) 66'
MF		(West Germany) Heinz Wilhelmi	(substituted on) 62'
Manager:
(West Germany) Erich Ribbeck

Match rules

- 90 minutes.
- 30 minutes of extra time if necessary.
- Replay if scores still level.
- Maximum of two substitutions.
