= Erwin Hermandung =

German footballer (born 1944)

Personal information
- Date of birth: 25 August 1944 (age 82)
- Place of birth: Hückelhoven, North Rhine-Westphalia, West Germany
- Positions: Centre-back; defensive midfielder

Youth career
- –1964: SV Baal

Senior career*
Years	Team	Apps	(Gls)
1964–1971	Alemannia Aachen	113	(20)
1971–1977	Hertha BSC	233	(41)
1977–1981	Eintracht Trier	158	(29)
1981–1982	SpVgg Bayreuth	31	(1)
Total		535	(191)
- * Club domestic league appearances and goals

Erwin Hermandung (born 25 August 1944) is a German retired footballer. He played as a centre-back and defensive midfielder for Alemannia Aachen and Hertha BSC within the Bundesliga throughout the 1960s and the 1970s.

== Club career ==
=== Alemannia Aachen (1964–1971) ===
Emerging from SV Baal, at the age of 19, Hermandung made his senior career debut with Alemannia Aachen who were playing in the old Regionalliga with Franz-Josef Nacken and Rainer Schönwälder also joining him as the club's new signings. Club manager Oswald Pfau immediately used Hermandung on the opening day of the 1964–65 season on 9 August 1964 against Eintracht Gelsenkirchen. The 1.83 m tall all-rounder then scored his first goal in the Regionalliga for Die Alemannen on the fourth matchday in a 4-1 home win against STV Horst. Aachen would end in 2nd place within their group behind champions and eventual Bundesliga newcomers Borussia Mönchengladbach and thus moved into the promotion round with his teammates. However, even with top performers Christian Breuer and Josef Martinelli would ultimately lose against Bayern Munich. In addition to the Regionalliga, Hermandung experienced a surprise entry into the final of the 1965 DFB-Pokal in his debut match at domestic cup football though Borussia Dortmund later won 2-0 in the match. Throughout the following 1965–66 Regionalliga, Hermandung missed out on another promotion round with Alemannia due to the club only reaching third place and thus missing out on the playoffs.

However, the arrival of manager Michael Pfeiffer would significantly reshape the team as Hermandung later won the 1966–67 Regionalliga. This success continued into the playoffs with Hermandung playing all eight matches and ultimately contributing to beating out Kickers Offenbach for promotion to the Bundesliga. Despite a moderate performance during his first Bundesliga season, the following 1968–69 season was one of the most successful in club history as with 33 appearances and 11 goals, Hermandung contributed to the club's runners-up position by the tournament. However, the club immediately fell on hard times during the following 1969–70 season saw the club get relegated. Unlike many players, Hermandung chose to stay for the 1970–71 season as he desired for an immediate promotion. Throughout the season, Hermandung was characterized by his strong defensive midfielding capabilities and scored 15 goals within the season alone, becoming the top scorer of the club alongside Hans-Jürgen Ferdinand. He notably had a highlight performance in a 4–0 victory over Viktoria Köln on 14 March 1971 as he scored all four goals throughout the match. However, with only 34 points within the Regionalliga West, the club failed to achieve the promotional playoffs.

=== Hertha BSC (1971–1977) ===
Despite Aachen's average performance, Hertha BSC manager Helmut Kronsbein brought Hermandung to Die Alte Dame in the summer of 1971 and used the ex-Aachen player in all 34 games of the 1971–72 season. The dress rehearsal before the start of the Bundesliga was through a friendly against Manchester City on 4 August 1971 with Hermandung forming Hertha's central defense alongside Uwe Witt. He also played in the 1971 Intertoto Cup against Zürich, Jednota Trenčín and Akademisk Boldklub where he contributed a goal in four appearances, helping the club lead within their group. Throughout his carer with Hertha, he was treated by Dr. Hans-Wilhelm Müller Wohlfahrt who was also the team doctor for Bayern Munich around the same era.

Volkmar Groß, Erich Beer, Lorenz Horr and Arno Steffenhagen were among the top performers of Hertha who later ended in sixth place by the end of the season. However, the 1971 Bundesliga Scandal would result in a major club overhaul with Hermandung now becoming the second oldest player behind Horr. Throughout the 1971–72 UEFA Cup, he gained international experience in the games against Swedish club IF Elfsborg and Italian club AC Milan through an initial 2-4 defeat and a 2-1 victory. Hermandung's greatest success with Hertha came during the 1974–75 season as the club achieved runners-up under manager Georg Kessler and forming a defensive combination with defenders Uwe Kliemann, Ludwig Müller, Michael Sziedat and Hans Weiner. Throughout the 1975–76 UEFA Cup, Hermandung gained experience in the games against HJK Helsinki and Ajax. Throughout his sixth and final season with Hertha BSC in the 1976–77 season, Hermandung made another 33 appearances, where he also scored five goals. The seasonal highlight, however, was his participation in the two-legged 1977 DFB-Pokal final on 28 May and 30 May respectively in Hanover against 1. FC Köln, winning the replay 1-0 with this success seeing Hermandung concluding his Bundesliga career after 192 appearances with 34 goals for Hertha BSC.

=== 2. Bundesliga (1977–1982) ===
At the age of 33, Hermandung accepted the challenge of the 2. Bundesliga with Eintracht Trier for their 1977–78 season. Despite his age, he made the club's starting XI throughout his career under coach Werner Kern though he failed to prevent Trier's relegation to the Amateuroberliga Südwest due to the merger of the 2. Bundesliga Nord and Sud by the end of the season. At the age of 37, he tried to save SpVgg Bayreuth from falling into the Amateuroberliga throughout the 1981–82 seaosn. Despite his appearance in 27 other games, alongside fellow veteran players Wolfgang Breuer and Manfred Größler, Bayreuth would ultimately be relegated with Hermandung retiring soon after.

== Later life ==
Following his career as a professional player, he returned to his homeland and lived in Hückelhoven where he coached various amateur clubs and was also an assistant coach at his former club of Alemannia Aachen.

Hermandung later got married and had two children with his wife: Susanne and Gerwin.
