= Hans-Dieter Wacker =

German footballer (1958–1993)

Personal information
- Full name: Hans-Dieter Wacker
- Date of birth: 28 December 1958
- Place of birth: Roßdorf, Hesse, West Germany
- Date of death: 3 October 1993 (aged 34)
- Position: Midfielder

Youth career
- SKV Büttelborn
- ???–1977: Eintracht Frankfurt Amateure

Senior career*
Years	Team	Apps	(Gls)
1977–1979	Eintracht Frankfurt	1	(0)
1979–1988	SKV Büttelborn		

International career
1974	West Germany U16	4	(0)
1975	West Germany Youth B	3	(1)
1976	West Germany Youth	3	(0)
- * Club domestic league appearances and goals

Hans-Dieter Wacker (28 December 1958 – 3 October 1993) was a German footballer who played as a midfielder. Nicknamed "Fips", he briefly played for Eintracht Frankfurt in the late 1970s before spending the rest of his career for SKV Büttelborn. He was known as a player who had suffered various illnesses and injuries throughout his short-lived career in the Bundesliga despite having an active youth career.

== Youth career ==
Wacker played in the youth of SKV Büttelborn when he was around eight or nine years old. In 1972, he would win his first title with the club at Duisburg-Wedau as part of the state youth championship with Helmut Schön and Hennes Weisweiler spectating overseeing the tournament as Wacker was named the best scorer. Following his recovery from a tetanus infection, he would return with him being described as "a fourteen-year-old with the experience of a mature man". He would then play for Eintracht Frankfurt Amateure as he would play against the youth sectors of Macabi Tel Aviv, Paris St. Germain, and Ajax. In 1976, he would face another setback as he would face a severe knee injury during a match against Union Niederrad as he underwent meniscus and ligament surgery. A similar injury would occur in 1977 where in a Oberliga match against SG Höchst where he would receive another injury on the same knee and underwent another surgery. Despite rumors that Wacker would've faced an early retirement at the age of 18, he would persist to begin his senior football career.

== Club career ==
From the 1977–78, he was part of the Eintracht Frankfurt squad but only made his Bundesliga appearance on 5 May 1979 in matchday 30 in a goalless draw in the away game against 1. FC Nürnberg. Previously, he had played two Group 3 matches in the 1977 Intertoto Cup. Due to his prior injuries and illnesses in his youth career, Wacker would lack the confidence to make an ultimate breakthrough at the Bundesliga as he persistently had self-doubt in his own abilities. At the end of the 1978–79 season, before his move to MSV Duisburg could be finalized, he would undergo another minor operation, which has been postponed again and again for six months over an initially small tumor on his collarbone for six months. However, worse news would arrive as on 18 June 1979, Wacker would receive the news that the tumor was in fact, not harmless and that he would be diagnosed with Hodgkin's disease, realizing that he would be unable to play in professional sport again. Despite this though, he was adamant in having the disease cured and after a year, he would make a full recovery despite his former club of Eintracht Frankfurt initially forgetting about him by the time of his recovery.

Beginning in January 1980, he played for the multi-division club SKV Büttelborn and would make an appearance as part of the headline a March 1980 issue of Kicker. Following the end of Jürgen Grabowski's career, he would suggest a charity match for Wacker between Eintracht Frankfurt and SKV Büttelborn which would take months for it to occur due to the club's conflicting schedule and constant postponing. Finally, the match was played on 8 October 1980 following Eintracht Frankfurt's return from playing against Belgium with it ultimately ending in a 7–0 loss for Büttelborn. Beginning in March 1982, he would begin to coach TSV Pfungstadt's youth B team following his acquisition of his coaching license and would serve as a player-manager from 1983 to 1988. Throughout his career with the club, he would play in 353 matches with 169 goals scored overall. His career would end with the club in May 1988 following various disagreements and would work as youth coach for TSV Wolfskehlen and Viktoria Griesheim as he would earn a reputation for being one of the best youth coaches within his home state of Hesse. His career as an active player would end in the early 1990s following a match for senior club SV Klein-Gerau.

== International career ==
Thanks to his outstanding technical and playing talent, he was included in the Germany national under-16 football team for his international debut on 27 April 1974. In the 2–0 win against the Netherlands in Marburg, he formed the German midfield together with Martin Haskamp and Klaus Santanius. In May and June of this year, he would make three more international appearances against France (2–0), England (0–4) and Wales (2-2). His international appointments continued seamlessly. He played the first game of the newly introduced Germany national youth football B team on 30 July 1975 in Heinola against Norway. He scored a goal in the 5–1 win at the tournament in Finland. Wacker also played against the other competitors from Denmark (2:4) on 1 August in Kuusankoski and from Iceland (2:1) on 2 August in Pieksämäki. In 1976, he played in the A youth team. He made his debut for them on 11 May in Copenhagen in a 2–1 win over Denmark. During his participation in the 1976 UEFA European Under-18 Championship held in Hungary, he played alongside Klaus Augenthaler and Ulrich Bittcher as midfielders in the matches against Finland (2–1) in Tapolce on 28 May and Czechoslovakia (3–2) in Balatonfűzfő on 1 June.

== Personal life and health ==
Hans-Dieter Wacker was born on 28 December 1958 at Roßdorf and would live with his grandparents throughout his childhood as he would begin play football in the yard. He earned the nickname "Fips" through his original surname of Fiebig and a slight alteration of his original nickname of "Fibbes". He adopted the Wacker surname through his adoptive father. Throughout his life, Wacker had various physical issues as between the ages of 9 and 11, he underwent three consecutive ear surgeries, and at 13 he survived severe meningitis. Following his successes in 1972, he was infected with tetanus for six weeks with his biggest concern being that he'd "never be able to play football again".

In 1975, during a youth tournament held at Zoetermeer, he would meet his girlfriend, Astrid. He would later marry her in August 1980. During his final years, despite his long series of injuries and illnesses, he was described as being relatively healthy until October 1993. Prior to his death on 3 October 1993, he had called a doctor for a diagnosis at night with his health deteriorating by the afternoon. By the evening hours, his wife Astrid would call an ambulance where she would receive the news that her husband had died from septic shock from Waterhouse-Friderichsen syndrome at 2:29 p.m. Over 500 people would attend his funeral as he was buried at Klein-Gerau. On 17 November 1993, a charity match was held for Wacker's family between Eintracht Frankfurt and TSV Wolfskehlen with the result being 4–1 with over 3,000 spectators overcrowding the stadium's capacity. He was survived by four children of three daughters and one son. His daughters would go on to become handball players for TSV Pfungstadt with one of them later having two sons. His son, Tibor Wacker also played as a footballer like his father as a striker.
