= Wolfgang Seel =

German footballer

Personal information
- Date of birth: 21 June 1948 (age 78)
- Place of birth: Kirkel, Germany
- Height: 1.73 m (5 ft 8 in)
- Positions: Striker; midfielder

Senior career*
Years	Team	Apps	(Gls)
1966–1971	1. FC Saarbrücken		
1971–1973	1. FC Kaiserslautern	65	(17)
1973–1982	Fortuna Düsseldorf	284	(59)
1982–1986	1. FC Saarbrücken	86	(19)
Total		435	(95)

International career
1974–1975	West Germany	6	(0)

Managerial career
- 1986: 1. FC Saarbrücken
- * Club domestic league appearances and goals

Wolfgang Seel (born 21 June 1948) is a German former footballer.

== Club career ==
He spent 12 seasons in the Bundesliga with 1. FC Kaiserslautern, Fortuna Düsseldorf and 1. FC Saarbrücken. In the West German top-flight, the 2. Bundesliga and the Regionalliga Seel played over 550 Matches.

In the 1979 DFB-Pokal Final, played on 23 June in Hanover against Hertha BSC, Seel scored the winning goal in Fortuna's 1–0 victory in the 116th minute. Seel intercepted a pass a Berlin defender had played back to his own goalkeeper, Norbert Nigbur, swerved around the lunging goaltender and scored with just four minutes to play in extra time. Under the rules in place at that time, had the game ended in a draw it would have been replayed several days later. Seel's goal earned Fortuna their first-ever Cup and made him a hero in Düsseldorf.

Wolfgang Seel also scored twice in Fortuna Düsseldorf's historic 7–1 win over FC Bayern München in the 1978/79 season, one of Fortuna Düsseldorf's highest-ever victories and one of the worst defeats in FC Bayern's history.

== International career ==
He represented West Germany six times. His caps include a UEFA Euro 1976 qualifier against Bulgaria and five friendlies.

== Honours ==
- UEFA Cup Winners' Cup finalist: 1979.
- Bundesliga 3rd place: 1974.
- DFB-Pokal winner: 1979, 1980.
- DFB-Pokal finalist: 1972, 1978.
