= Kurt Eigl =

German footballer

Personal information
- Date of birth: 7 March 1954 (age 72)
- Place of birth: Hockenheim, West Germany
- Position: Midfielder

Senior career*
Years	Team	Apps	(Gls)
1972–1978	Hamburg	66	(13)
1978–1979	Darmstadt 98	33	(5)
1979–1982	Bayer Leverkusen	39	(2)
- * Club domestic league appearances and goals

Kurt Eigl (born 7 March 1954) is a retired German football player. He spent ten seasons in the Bundesliga with Hamburg, Darmstadt 98, and Bayer Leverkusen.

Eigl made 138 appearances in the Bundesliga during his career and scored 20 goals. He was part of the early years of the golden era of HSV, helping the club to the DFB-Pokal in 1976, starting the final, and the European Cup Winners' Cup in 1977.

== Honours ==
Hamburger SV

- DFB-Pokal: 1975–76; runner-up: 1973–74
- European Cup Winners' Cup: 1976–77
