= Walter Frosch =

German footballer

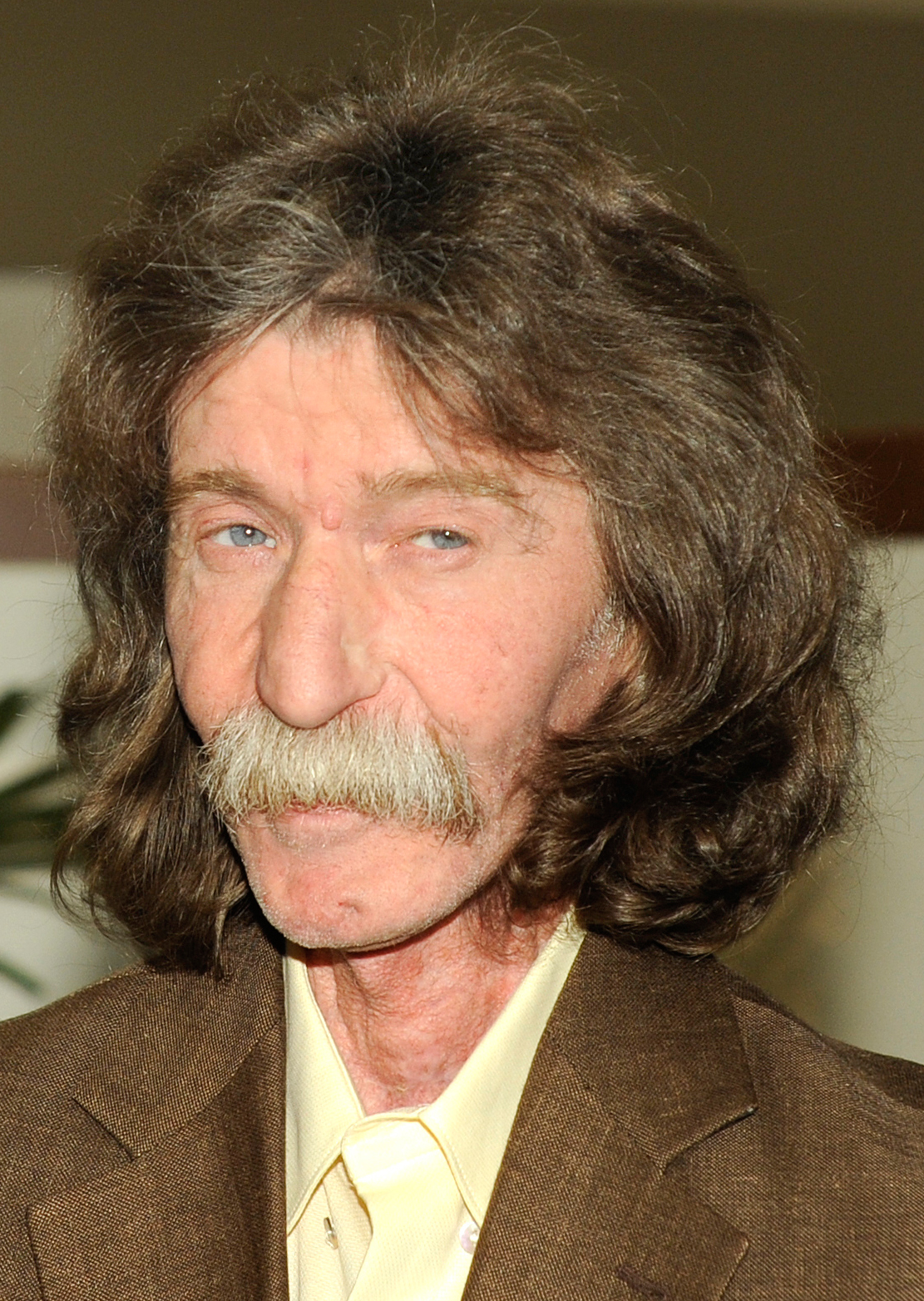
- Frosch in 2008

Personal information
- Date of birth: 19 December 1950
- Place of birth: Ludwigshafen am Rhein, West Germany
- Date of death: 23 November 2013 (aged 62)
- Position: Defender

Senior career*
Years	Team	Apps	(Gls)
1970–1972	SV Alsenborn		
1974–1976	1. FC Kaiserslautern	43	(3)
1976–1979	FC St. Pauli	81	(8)
Total		124	(11)
- * Club domestic league appearances and goals

Walter Frosch (19 December 1950 – 23 November 2013) was a German professional footballer who played as a defender.

== Career ==
Frosch played for SV Alsenborn, 1. FC Kaiserslautern and FC St. Pauli.

== Legacy ==
Frosch gained renewed, lasting fame through a half-time interview given on 9 September 2007 at the "Tag der Legenden" (Day of Legends) event at the Millerntor-Stadion, in which he appeared with a cigarette pack in his sock. The clip became a viral internet meme in Germany, accumulating millions of views on YouTube, especially through his thick Palatinate dialect pronunciation of Zigaretten ("cigarettes") as "Zijaretten".

Frosch became known for the exceptionally large number of yellow cards he received in the second-division season of 1976–77. Soon afterwards, the DFB introduced an automatic match suspension after four (today five) yellow cards. There are two versions of the exact number of yellow cards in 1976–77:

- For a long time the incorrect figure of 27 yellow cards circulated, which is in part still used today. Compared with this figure, according to the Süddeutsche Zeitung there is no professional footballer anywhere in the world who has received more yellow cards in a single season.
- The authors of FC St. Pauli's anniversary book, Christoph Nagel and Michael Pahl, concluded in their research that the figure of 27 was incorrect and that there were in fact 18 or 19 yellow cards that season (the exact number can no longer be determined).

Two matches before the end of the season, Frosch was quoted in the Hamburg press as saying:

Gegen Solingen und im letzten Spiel bei Wacker Berlin hole ich mir noch je eine Gelbe, dann bin ich auf 20, und das ist doch eine runde Sache, oder?

Against Solingen and in the final match at Wacker Berlin I'll pick up one more yellow each, then I'll be on 20, and that's a nice round number, isn't it?

— Walter Frosch, FC St. Pauli. Alles drin, p. 48.

Frosch then fell short of his goal, however; the kicker spoke at the time of 18 yellow cards, the 1977–78 Bundesliga special issue of Sport Megaphon likewise of 18, and the Hamburger Abendblatt of 19. Across the three Bundesliga seasons, Frosch was shown 17 yellow cards, but did not receive a single red.

Frosch died from a cardiac arrest in 2013, aged 62.
