= Lothar Skala =

German footballer (1952–2008)

- Skala in the 1975–76 season

Personal information
- Date of birth: 2 May 1952
- Place of birth: Groß-Gerau, Hesse, West Germany
- Date of death: 28 September 2008 (aged 56)
- Position: Central defender

Youth career
- 1969–1970: Kickers Offenbach

Senior career*
Years	Team	Apps	(Gls)
1970–1977	Kickers Offenbach	155	(10)
1977–1979	Eintracht Frankfurt	10	(0)
1979–1980	Chicago Sting	0	(0)

International career
1969–1970	West Germany U18	8	(2)
1973	West Germany U23	3	(0)
1975	West Germany B	1	(0)
- * Club domestic league appearances and goals

Lothar Skala (2 May 1952 – 28 September 2008) was a German footballer and businessman. He played for Kickers Offenbach and played 93 league games and scored in several seasons of the Bundesliga between 1970 and 1979. He represented his home country of West Germany internationally throughout the 1970s. He was also known for opening the first Burger King in Germany in 1980.

== Club career ==
Skala grew up in the Dornheim district of Groß-Gerau and began playing football at his hometown club, SG Dornheim 1886 e. V. In 1969, as an A-youth player, he moved to Kickers Offenbach and signed his first professional contract there at the age of 18 in 1970. In his first season, he made just seven appearances as a forward, and the team was relegated from the Bundesliga at the end of the season. Skala stayed with Offenbach and returned to the Bundesliga with the 1972–73 as a central defender and regular. In the 1972–73 season, he was a part of the Starting XI for all of Offenbach's matches. The following years were largely marked by injuries. After Kickers Offenbach were relegated again in the 1975–76 Bundesliga as well as in the 1976 Intertoto Cup, Skala moved to rivals Eintracht Frankfurt after the 1976–77 2. Bundesliga, where he played until the 1978–79 season as he only made 10 appearances for the club. Skala made a total of 93 Bundesliga appearances, scoring three goals. In 1979, he became one of the first Germans to join the Chicago Sting in the North American Soccer League before subsequently ending his football career due to irreparable knee damage.

== International career ==
After moving to Kickers Offenbach in 1969, Skala was called up to the West Germany U18 national team. He participated in the 1970 UEFA European Under-18 Championship, scoring two goals in eight matches. he also made three appearances for the West Germany U23 in 1973. On 25 April 1975, in Offenbach, Skala played for West Germany B against Finland, which the B team won 6-0.

== Later life ==
In 1980, Skala opened Germany's first franchised Burger King branch in Darmstadt before he later expanded to operate six branches. He also worked as a FIFA-licensed player as he supported his local youth club, SG Dornheim, for many years both as a volunteer and as a sponsor.

Skala died in September 2008 after a serious illness.
