= Manfred Lenz =

German footballer

Personal information
- Date of birth: 21 November 1947
- Place of birth: Rockenhausen, Germany
- Date of death: 16 June 2021 (aged 73)
- Position: Forward

Senior career*
Years	Team	Apps	(Gls)
1968–1972	SV Alsenborn		
1972–1974	Hertha BSC		
1974–1986	FC 08 Homburg		

Managerial career
- 1990: FC 08 Homburg (caretaker)
- 1994: FC 08 Homburg (caretaker)
- 1995: FC 08 Homburg (caretaker)
- 2001: FC 08 Homburg (caretaker)
- * Club domestic league appearances and goals

Manfred Lenz (21 November 1947 – 16 June 2021) was a German football striker.
