= Peter Lübeke =

German footballer (1952–2022)

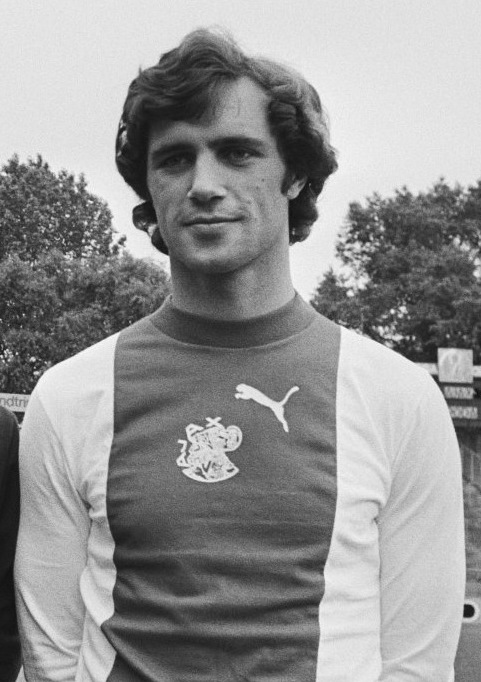
- Lübeke in 1977

Personal information
- Date of birth: 26 November 1952
- Place of birth: Perleberg, East Germany
- Date of death: 22 July 2022 (aged 69)
- Positions: Midfielder; forward

Senior career*
Years	Team	Apps	(Gls)
1971–1973	Hamburger SV	21	(7)
1973–1975	1. FC Saarbrücken	37	(9)
1975–1976	Bayer Uerdingen	23	(3)
1976–1977	Hércules	30	(2)
1977	Ajax	6	(0)
1977–1980	Eintracht Braunschweig	27	(3)
Total		144	(24)
- * Club domestic league appearances and goals

Peter Lübeke (26 November 1952 – 22 July 2022) was a German professional footballer who played as a midfielder or forward for Hamburger SV, 1. FC Saarbrücken, Bayer Uerdingen, Hércules CF, Ajax and Eintracht Braunschweig.

Lübeke died on 22 July 2022, at the age of 69.
