= Peter Schwarz =

German footballer

Personal information
- Date of birth: 14 June 1953 (age 73)
- Place of birth: Hochspeyer, Germany
- Height: 1.78 m (5 ft 10 in)
- Position: Defender

Youth career
- 1961–1972: DJK Grün-Weiß Hochspeyer

Senior career*
Years	Team	Apps	(Gls)
1972–1980	1. FC Kaiserslautern	147	(20)
1980–1984	Bayer Uerdingen	100	(4)
1984–1986	VfR Bürstadt		
- * Club domestic league appearances and goals

Peter Schwarz (born 14 June 1953) is a German former football player. He spent 10 seasons in the Bundesliga with 1. FC Kaiserslautern and Bayer Uerdingen.

== Honours ==
- DFB-Pokal finalist: 1976.
- Bundesliga 3rd place: 1979, 1980.
