= Frank Hanisch =

German footballer

Personal information
- Full name: Frank Hanisch
- Date of birth: 6 November 1953 (age 72)
- Place of birth: Berlin, Germany
- Position: Defender

Youth career
- –1971: BFC Nordstern
- 1971–1972: Hertha BSC

Senior career*
Years	Team	Apps	(Gls)
1972–1977	Hertha BSC	67	(1)
1977–1978	Wuppertaler SV	13	(0)
1979–1981	Tennis Borussia Berlin	45	(1)
Total		125	(2)
- * Club domestic league appearances and goals

Frank Hanisch (born 6 November 1953, in Berlin) is a former professional German footballer.

In the 1970s, Hanisch made a total of 67 Bundesliga appearances for Hertha BSC before later moving to Wuppertaler SV and Tennis Borussia Berlin.

His brother, Klaus-Peter Hanisch (1952–2009), was also a professional footballer.
