= Bernd Lehmann =

German footballer

Personal information
- Date of birth: 1 September 1947 (age 79)
- Place of birth: Krefeld, Germany
- Height: 1.80 m (5 ft 11 in)
- Position: Attacking midfielder

Senior career*
| Years | Team | Apps | (Gls) |
| 1967–1975 | MSV Duisburg | 200 | (43) |
| 1975–1976 | Strasbourg | 22 | (3) |
| Total | | 222 | (46) |
- * Club domestic league appearances and goals

Bernd Lehmann (born 1 September 1947) is a German former footballer who played as an attacking midfielder.
