= Klaus-Peter Hanisch =

German footballer

Personal information
- Full name: Klaus-Peter Hanisch
- Date of birth: 29 January 1952
- Place of birth: Berlin, Germany
- Date of death: 30 August 2009 (aged 57)
- Place of death: Berlin, Germany
- Position: Defender

Youth career
- –1970: Hertha Zehlendorf

Senior career*
Years	Team	Apps	(Gls)
1970–1972	Hertha Zehlendorf		
1972–1974	Hertha BSC	10	(0)
1974–1976	SC Wacker 04 Berlin	74	(3)
1976–1980	Tennis Borussia Berlin	52	(0)
Total		136	(3)
- * Club domestic league appearances and goals

Klaus-Peter Hanisch (29 January 1952 – 30 August 2009) was a professional German footballer.

In the 1970s, Hanisch made a total of 19 Bundesliga appearances for Hertha BSC and Tennis Borussia Berlin. His playing career was cut short as he was forced to retire aged 28 due to injury. Hanisch died in 2009 of a heart attack.
