= Kurt Müller (footballer) =

Swiss footballer and manager (born 1948)

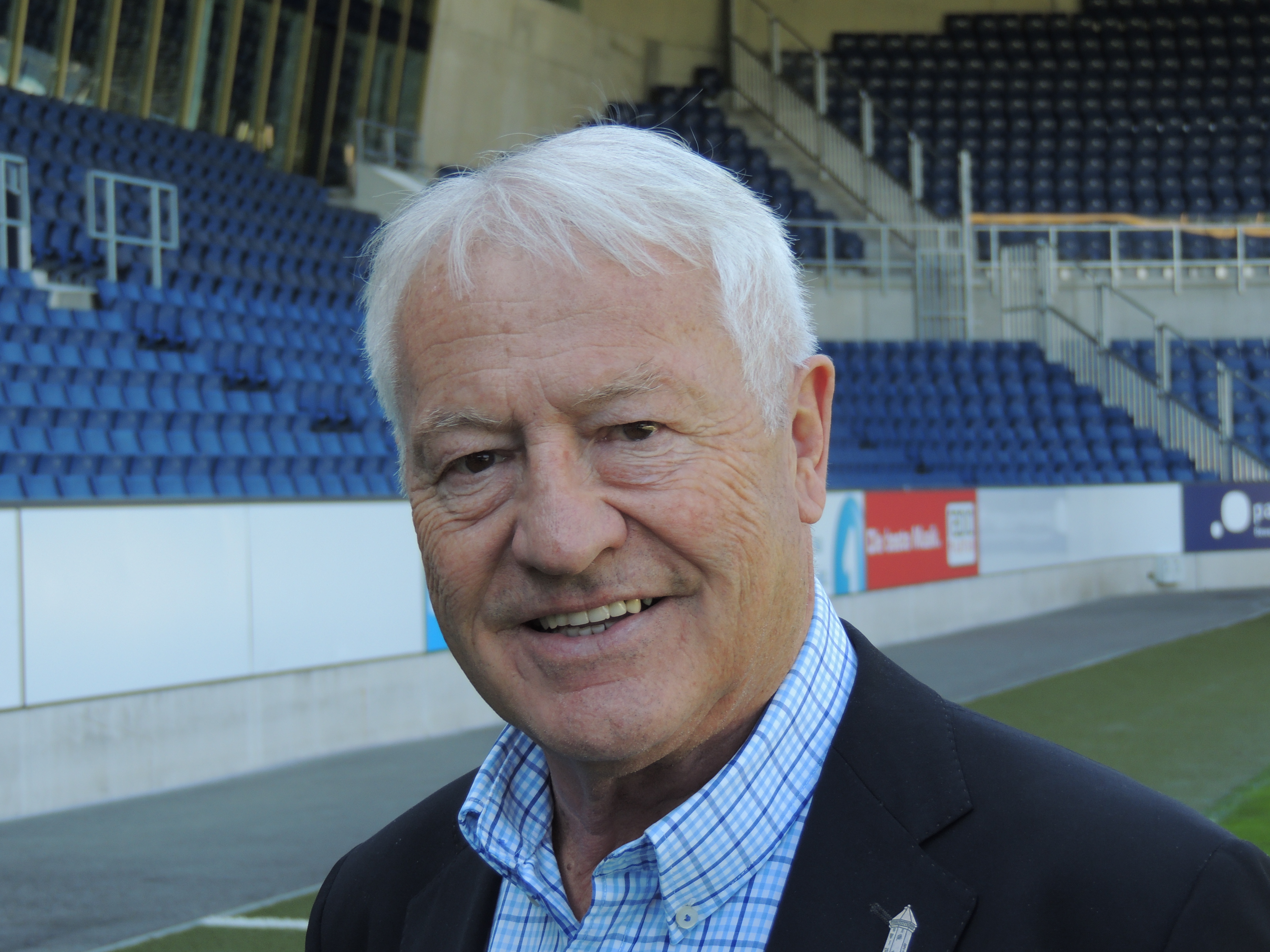
- Müller in 2017

Personal information
- Date of birth: 9 May 1948 (age 78)
- Place of birth: Lucerne, Switzerland
- Position: Forward

Senior career*
| Years | Team | Apps | (Gls) |
| 1967–1968 | FC Emmenbrücke | | |
| 1968–1971 | FC Luzern | 49 | (22) |
| 1971–1972 | Grasshoppers Zurich | 37 | (15) |
| 1972–1975 | Hertha BSC | 77 | (20) |
| 1975–1977 | Servette FC | 41 | (10) |
| 1977–1981 | BSC Young Boys | 90 | (19) |

International career
| 1970–1977 | Switzerland | 38 | (7) |

Managerial career
- 1986–1987: SC Kriens
- 1997: FC Luzern
- * Club domestic league appearances and goals

Kurt "Kudi" Müller (born 9 May 1948) is a Swiss former footballer who was capped on 38 occasions by the Switzerland national football team, scoring eight goals.

Müller started his career with FC Emmenbrücke and then played for FC Luzern and Grasshopper Club Zürich.

In January 1973, Müller moved to Germany to play club football for Hertha BSC. He went on to make 77 league appearances for the Berlin side over the next two and a half seasons, and in 1974–75 he helped Hertha finish as runners-up in the Bundesliga.

After leaving Hertha, Müller returned to Switzerland to play for Servette FC for the 1975–76 season, and he played for them in the final of the 1975 Coppa delle Alpi tournament, in which they defeated FC Basel 3–0. Müller finished his career with the Bern team BSC Young Boys.

Müller made his international debut for Switzerland on 15 December 1970, in a UEFA Euro 1972 qualifying match against Greece. His final international cap came almost seven years later in a 1978 FIFA World Cup qualification match against Norway on 30 October 1977.

Müller coached SC Kriens in 1986–87. He later became manager at FC Luzern, and he was in charge when they reached the final of the Swiss Cup in 1996–97, although they lost on penalties to FC Sion.
