= Gerd Hennig =

German football referee (1935–2017)

- Born: 24 April 1935; Meiderich, Germany
- Died: 26 December 2017 (aged 82)
- Other occupation: Managing clerk

Domestic
Years	League	Role
1975–1982	2. Bundesliga	Referee
1964–1982	Bundesliga	Referee

Gerd Hennig (24 April 1935 – 26 December 2017) was a German football referee.

Between 1964 and 1982, he refereed a total of 161 games in the Bundesliga, Germany's top football league. He refereed the DFB-Pokal final between FC Bayern Munich and 1. FC Nürnberg in 1982. Hennig is also Chairman referee of the region Duisburg – Mülheim – Dinslaken and lives in Duisburg.
