= Thomas Zander (footballer) =

German footballer (born 1951)

Personal information
- Date of birth: 10 August 1951 (age 75)
- Position: Goalkeeper

Senior career*
Years	Team	Apps	(Gls)
1970–1976	Hertha BSC		
1976–1978	Wormatia Worms		
1979–1987	TSV 1860 Munich		

Managerial career
- 1987: TSV 1860 Munich
- * Club domestic league appearances and goals

Thomas Zander (born 10 August 1951) is a retired German football goalkeeper.
