= Horst Wolter =

German former international footballer

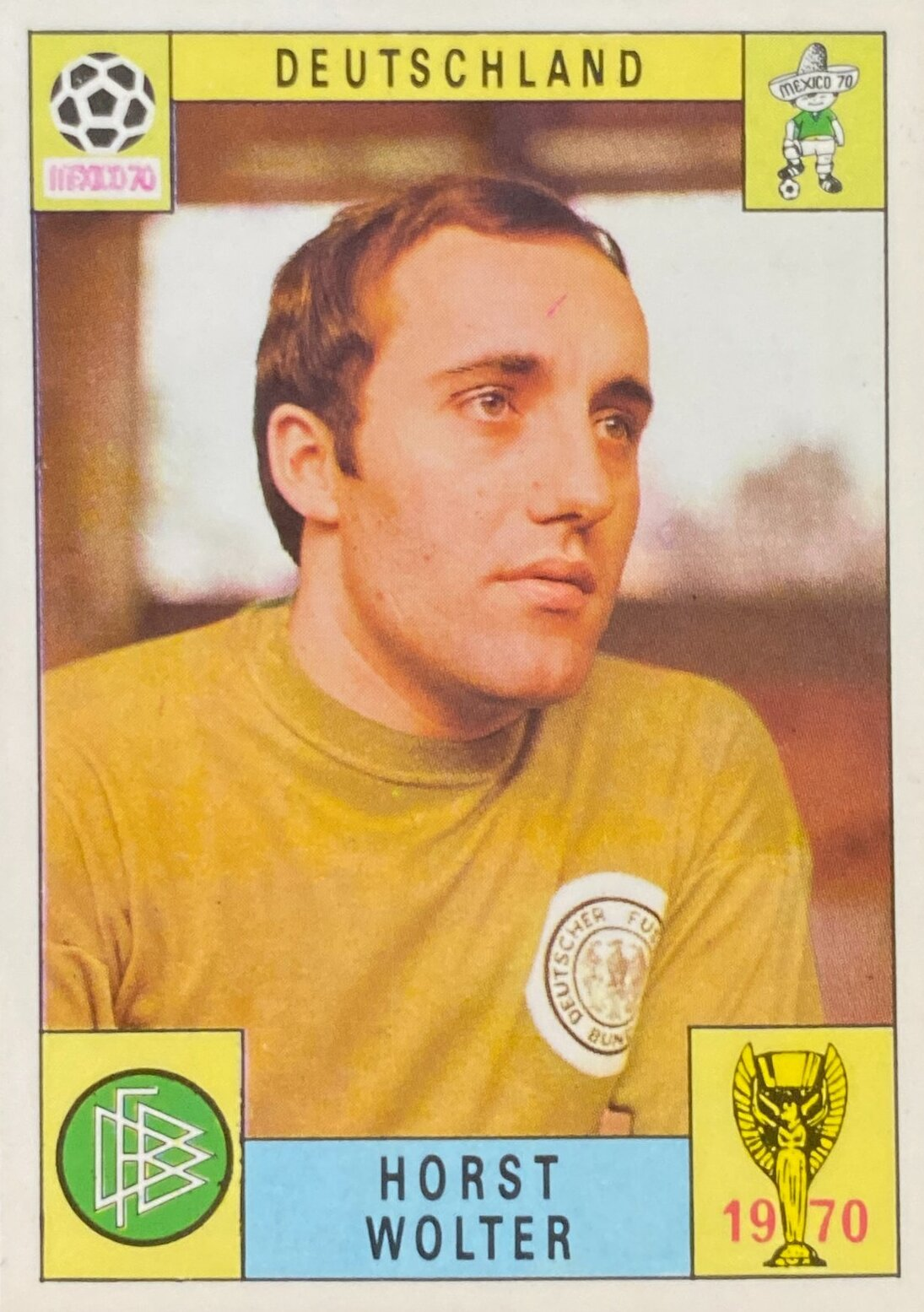
- Wolter at the 1970 FIFA World Cup

Personal information
- Full name: Horst Wolter
- Date of birth: 8 June 1942 (age 84)
- Place of birth: Berlin, Germany
- Height: 1.82 m (6 ft 0 in)
- Position: Goalkeeper

Youth career
- SC Charlottenburg

Senior career*
Years	Team	Apps	(Gls)
1963–1972	Eintracht Braunschweig	201	(0)
1972–1977	Hertha BSC	48	(0)
Total		249	(0)

International career
1967–1970	West Germany	13	(0)
Medal record
Men's football
Representing West Germany
FIFA World Cup
Third place	1970 Mexico
- * Club domestic league appearances and goals

Horst Wolter (born 8 June 1942 in Berlin, Germany) is a German former international footballer who played as a goalkeeper.

== Club career ==
A Bundesliga winner with Eintracht Braunschweig in 1967, Wolter played almost 250 West German top-flight matches for Braunschweig and Hertha BSC.

== International career ==
The goalkeeper won 13 caps for the West Germany national team between 1967 and 1970. Wolter played his final match for Die Mannschaft in the third-place play-off win at the 1970 FIFA World Cup, replacing regular first choice Sepp Maier, against Uruguay.

== Honours ==
=== Club ===
Eintracht Braunschweig

- Bundesliga: 1966–67
