= Johannes Riedl =

German footballer

Personal information
- Date of birth: 2 January 1950
- Place of birth: Holzweisig, Germany (East Germany)
- Date of death: 19 August 2010 (aged 60)
- Place of death: Pirmasens, Germany
- Height: 1.66 m (5 ft 5 in)
- Position: Midfielder

Senior career*
Years	Team	Apps	(Gls)
1967–1968	FK Pirmasens		
1968–1972	MSV Duisburg	120	(9)
1972–1974	Hertha BSC	52	(3)
1974–1981	1. FC Kaiserslautern	215	(31)
1981–1983	Arminia Bielefeld	45	(6)
1983–1984	Kickers Offenbach	9	(0)
- * Club domestic league appearances and goals

Johannes Riedl (2 January 1950 – 19 August 2010) was a German professional footballer who played as a midfielder. He made 441 appearances in the Bundesliga. He is the father of Thomas Riedl.

== Honours ==
- DFB-Pokal: runner-up 1975–76, 1980–81
