= Wolfgang Sidka =

German footballer (born 1954)

Personal information
- Date of birth: 26 May 1954 (age 72)
- Place of birth: Lengerich, Westphalia, West Germany
- Height: 1.85 m (6 ft 1 in)
- Position: Midfielder

Youth career
- 1970–1971: Berliner SV

Senior career*
Years	Team	Apps	(Gls)
1971–1980	Hertha BSC	184	(24)
1980–1982	1860 Munich	71	(18)
1982–1987	Werder Bremen	115	(17)
1987–1989	Tennis Borussia Berlin		
1989–1992	VfB Oldenburg	24	(6)

Managerial career
- 1988–1989: Tennis Borussia Berlin (player-Coach)
- 1989–1992: VfB Oldenburg (player-Coach)
- 1992–1993: VfB Oldenburg
- 1993–1994: Tennis Borussia Berlin
- 1994: Arminia Bielefeld
- 1995–1997: FC Oberneuland
- 1997: Werder Bremen (assistant)
- 1997–1998: Werder Bremen
- 1999–2000: VfL Osnabrück
- 2000–2003: Bahrain
- 2003–2005: Al-Arabi
- 2005: Bahrain
- 2006: MSV Neuruppin
- 2006–2007: Al-Gharafa
- 2007–2008: Berliner Sport-Club
- 2008–2009: FC Oberneuland
- 2010–2011: Iraq
- * Club domestic league appearances and goals

Wolfgang Sidka (born 26 May 1954 in Lengerich) is a football manager and former player. He managed SV Werder Bremen to victory in the UEFA Intertoto Cup in 1998. He was head coach of the Iraq national team between 9 August 2010 and 2 August 2011.

== Managerial record ==
As of 2 August 2011

Team	From	To	Record				
Team	From	To	P	W	D	L	Win %
Tennis Borussia Berlin	1 July 1988	30 June 1989	32	12	7	13	37.50
VfB Oldenburg	19 October 1989	15 February 1993	0	0	0	0	—
Tennis Borussia Berlin	19 October 1993	11 June 1994	29	7	11	11	24.14
Arminia Bielefeld	30 July 1994	28 August 1994	4	2	1	1	50.00
FC Oberneuland	1 July 1995	30 June 1997	0	0	0	0	—
Werder Bremen	23 August 1997	20 October 1998	53	25	9	19	47.17
VfL Osnabrück	9 June 1999	13 February 2000	24	15	5	4	62.50
Bahrain	1 November 2000	31 March 2003	41	14	13	14	34.15
Al-Arabi	16 November 2003	30 June 2005	52	25	11	16	48.08
Bahrain	25 March 2005	8 June 2005	5	1	1	3	20.00
MSV Neuruppin	9 April 2006	28 May 2006	6	3	1	2	50.00
Al-Gharafa	7 December 2006	19 May 2007	21	10	7	4	47.62
Berliner Sport Club	1 September 2007	28 October 2007	8	1	1	6	12.50
FC Oberneuland	16 November 2008	20 December 2008	6	1	2	3	16.67
Iraq	8 August 2010	8 August 2011	28	13	6	9	46.43
