= Michael Sziedat =

German footballer

Personal information
- Full name: Michael Sziedat
- Date of birth: 22 August 1952 (age 74)
- Place of birth: Germany
- Position: Defender

Youth career
- BC Lichterfelde
- –1971: BFC Preussen

Senior career*
Years	Team	Apps	(Gls)
1971–1980	Hertha BSC	280	(12)
1980–1984	Eintracht Frankfurt	99	(4)
1984–1985	Hertha BSC	18	(0)
- * Club domestic league appearances and goals

Michael Sziedat (born 22 August 1952) is a former German football player.

Sziedat played 379 times for Hertha BSC and Eintracht Frankfurt in the Bundesliga, netting 16 goals. His 280 Bundesliga caps for Berlin are still a club record. In 1971 he started his pro career at Hertha and left them after being relegated in 1980 to play for the "Eagles" in Frankfurt.

== Honours ==
=== Club ===
Eintracht Frankfurt

- DFB-Pokal: 1980–81

Hertha BSC

- DFB-Pokal: runner-up 1976–77, 1978–79
- Bundesliga: runner-up 1974–75
