= Holger Brück =

German footballer (1947–2026)

Personal information
- Date of birth: 30 September 1947
- Place of birth: Kassel, Hesse, Allied-occupied Germany
- Date of death: 19 July 2026 (aged 78)
- Place of death: Kassel, Hesse, Germany
- Height: 1.71 m (5 ft 7 in)
- Position: Defender

Senior career*
Years	Team	Apps	(Gls)
1966–1968	KSV Hessen Kassel II		
1968–1972	KSV Hessen Kassel		
1972–1981	Hertha BSC		
1981	Calgary Boomers		
1982	KSV Hessen Kassel		
1983	Calgary Mustangs		
1983–1987	Eintracht Baunatal		
1987–1990	KSV Hessen Kassel		

Managerial career
- 1987–1988: KSV Hessen Kassel (player-manager)
- 1988–1989: KSV Hessen Kassel II
- 1993: KSV Hessen Kassel
- 1994–1995: KSV Hessen Kassel II
- 1995–1996: KSV Hessen Kassel
- 2001: KSV Hessen Kassel
- 2011: KSV Hessen Kassel
- * Club domestic league appearances and goals

Holger Brück (30 September 1947 – 19 July 2026) was a German professional football player and manager. He played as a defender. In 1983, he played for the Calgary Mustangs of the Canadian Professional Soccer League.

== Death ==
Brück died in Kassel on 19 July 2026, at the age of 78, following a long illness. His death was met with widespread mourning across German football, with official tributes released by both Hertha BSC and KSV Hessen Kassel commemorating his extensive legacy as a player, leader, and club savior.
