= Erich Beer =

German footballer (born 1946)

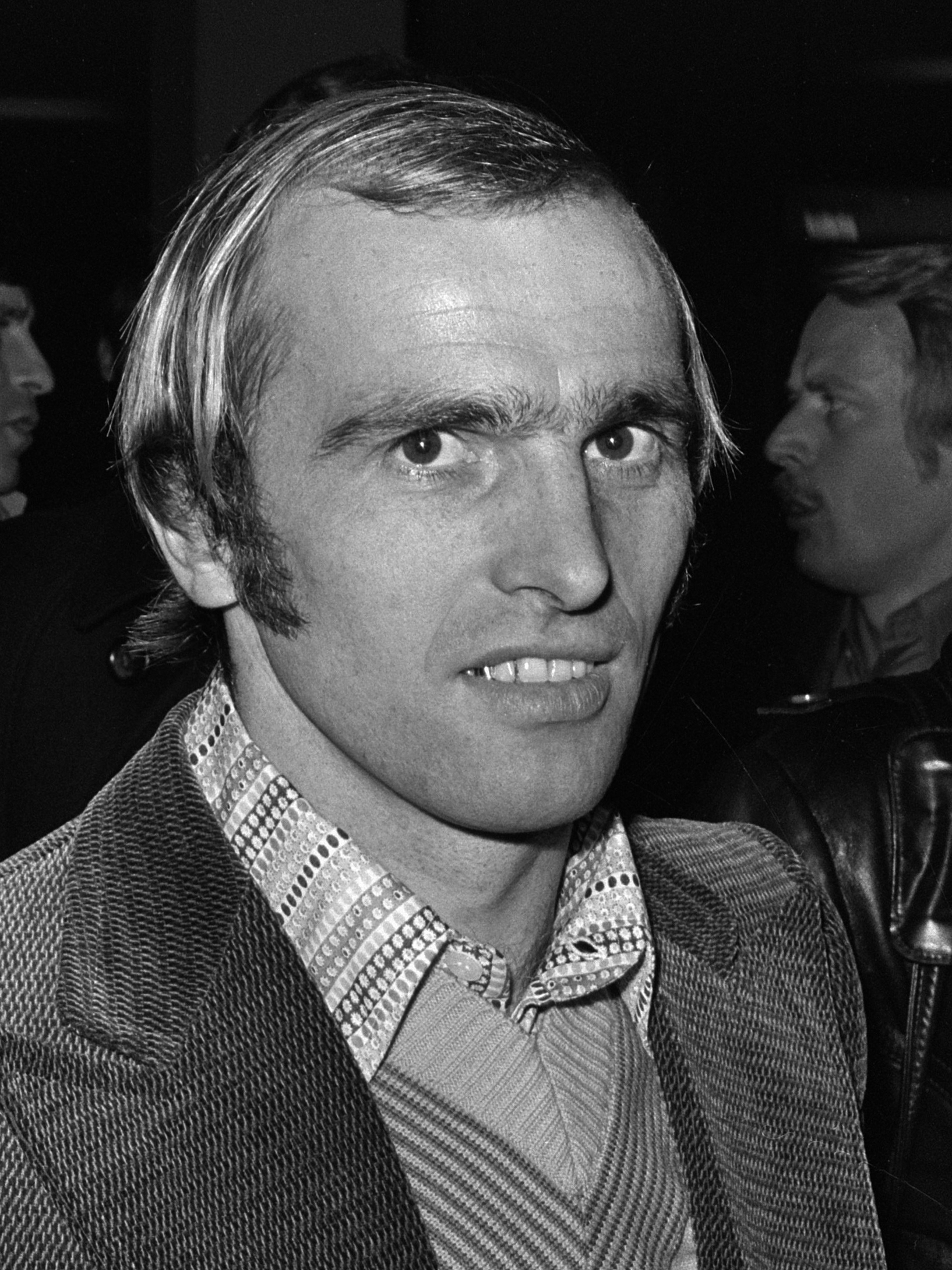
- Beer in 1975

Personal information
- Date of birth: 9 December 1946 (age 79)
- Place of birth: Neustadt bei Coburg, Germany
- Height: 1.73 m (5 ft 8 in)
- Position: Midfielder

Youth career
- 1953–1960: SpVgg Ebing
- 1960–1967: VfL Neustadt/Coburg
- 1967–1968: SpVgg Fürth

Senior career*
Years	Team	Apps	(Gls)
1968–1969	1. FC Nürnberg	25	(2)
1969–1971	Rot-Weiss Essen	64	(10)
1971–1979	Hertha BSC	253	(83)
1979–1981	Al-Ittihad		
1981–1982	1860 Munich	30	(9)

International career
1975–1978	West Germany	24	(7)

Managerial career
- 1983: 1860 Munich
- 1984: 1860 Munich
- 1985: SpVgg Bayreuth
- * Club domestic league appearances and goals

Erich "Ete" Beer (born 9 December 1946) is a German former football player and coach.

== Career ==
Beer was born in Neustadt bei Coburg. He started his career at SpVgg Ebing and played until 1968 with VfL Neustadt, until a move to the Bundesliga saw him play for 1. FC Nürnberg, Rot-Weiss Essen and Hertha BSC. For these teams he played in Midfield in a total of 342 games, scoring 95 goals. After playing for Ittihad Jeddah, Beer moved to TSV 1860 Munich in 1981, where he played until 1982.

Between 1975 and 1978 he played in 24 games for the West Germany national team, scoring seven goals.

Beer was referred to by reporters as "The Berliner Beer", but was better known by fans as "Ete". Today he lives in Munich.
