= Hans Weiner =

German footballer (1950–2024)

Personal information
- Date of birth: 29 November 1950
- Place of birth: Neuenkirchen, North Rhine-Westphalia, West Germany
- Date of death: 21 August 2024 (aged 73)
- Position: Defender

Senior career*
Years	Team	Apps	(Gls)
1969–1972	Tennis Borussia Berlin		
1972–1979	Hertha BSC	218	(12)
1979–1982	Bayern Munich	91	(2)
1982–1984	Chicago Sting	33	(5)
1983–1984	Chicago Sting (indoor)	27	(11)
1984–1986	Hertha BSC	65	(3)

International career
1978	West Germany B	1	(0)
- * Club domestic league appearances and goals

Hans Weiner (29 November 1950 – 21 August 2024) was a German footballer who played as a defender. He spent much of his career in Berlin, with three years at Tennis Borussia, and nine years in two spells at Hertha BSC. He also had two years with Bayern Munich, where he had his greatest successes, winning two Bundesliga titles and appearing in the 1982 European Cup Final. He stayed in the United States for three years, playing for Chicago Sting. After retiring, he ran a bar in Berlin, named Hanne am Zoo. Weiner died on 21 August 2024, at the age of 73.
