= 1975–76 Eintracht Frankfurt season =

Eintracht Frankfurt
1975–76 season
- Chairman: Achaz von Thümen
- Manager: Dietrich Weise
- Bundesliga: 9th
- DFB-Pokal: 4th Round
- European Cup Winners' Cup: Semi-finals
- Top goalscorer: League: Bernd Hölzenbein (16); All: Bernd Hölzenbein (24)
- Highest home attendance: 55,000 22 November 1975 v Bayern Munich (league)
- Lowest home attendance: 7,000 14 February 1976 v Fortuna Düsseldorf (league)
- Average home league attendance: 21,529

The 1975–76 Eintracht Frankfurt season was the 76th season in the club's football history. In 1975–76 the club played in the Bundesliga, the top tier of German football. It was the club's 13th season in the Bundesliga.

== Matches ==
=== Legend ===
Win Draw Loss Postponed

=== Friendlies ===
19 July 1975	SC 08 Bamberg (West Germany)	1–6	(West Germany) Eintracht Frankfurt	West Germany
	Gotthardt 55'	Report	Beverungen 6', 73'; Krobbach 20'; Lorenz 22'; Stradt 77'; Wenzel 85'	Attendance: 3,000; Referee: Bienlein

21 July 1975	TSV Straubing (West Germany)	2–6	(West Germany) Eintracht Frankfurt	West Germany
	Grill 4'; Wittmann 75'	Report	Körbel 13'; Lorenz 27'; Grabowski 31'; Weidle 37'; Nickel 42'; Beverungen 65'	Attendance: 4,000; Referee: Gmeinwieser

22 July 1975	1. FC Passau (West Germany)	1–3	(West Germany) Eintracht Frankfurt	Passau, West Germany
	Neulinger 86'	Report	Grabowski 8'; Hölzenbein 74', 81'	Stadium: Dreiflüssestadion; Attendance: 5,000

23 July 1975	SC Zwiesel (West Germany)	0–11	(West Germany) Eintracht Frankfurt	West Germany
		Report	Lorenz 18', 27'; Hölzenbein 22', 70'; 53' (o.g.); Nickel 56', 64'; Grabowski 68'; Stradt 71', 74'; Krobbach 77'

25 July 1975	Jahn Regensburg (West Germany)	0–5	(West Germany) Eintracht Frankfurt	West Germany
		Report	Weidle 23'; Lorenz 37'; Nickel 47', 60'; Beverungen 85'	Attendance: 7,000; Referee: Hofmeister

27 July 1975 50th anniversary of Waldstadion	Eintracht Frankfurt (West Germany)	1–1	(West Germany) Kickers Offenbach	Frankfurt, West Germany
17:15 CEST	Krobbach 85'	Report	Bitz 80'	Stadium: Waldstadion; Attendance: 40,000; Referee: Quindeau

29 July 1975	VfB Gießen (West Germany)	2–4	(West Germany) Eintracht Frankfurt	West Germany
	Döring 60', 68'	Report	Körbel 41'; Grabowski 45'; Hölzenbein 46'; Wenzel 71'	Attendance: 6,000

3 August 1975	1. FC Paderborn (West Germany)	2–4	(West Germany) Eintracht Frankfurt	Paderborn, West Germany
	Voss 37'; Meier 80'	Report	Stradt 5', 25'; Grether 27' (o.g.); Lorenz 87'	Attendance: 4,000; Referee: Knüppel

5 August 1975	SpVgg 1910 Langenselbold (West Germany)	0–7	(West Germany) Eintracht Frankfurt	West Germany
		Report	Grabowski 32', 85'; Stradt 36'; Weidle 43'; Hölzenbein 59', 80', 88'

12 August 1975	SV Hattersheim (West Germany)	0–30	(West Germany) Eintracht Frankfurt	West Germany
		Report	Neuberger 6'; Körbel 7', 87' (pen.); Nickel 11', 12', 44', 50', 72', 77', 83', 89'; Hölzenbein 16', 34', 40', 60', 85', 86'; Grabowski 21', 22', 39', 43', 45', 65', 73', 75', 90'; 28' (o.g.); Wenzel 48', 70'; Krobbach 71'	Attendance: 3,000; Referee: Geissel

19 August 1975	Butzbach XI (West Germany)	0–5	(West Germany) Eintracht Frankfurt	Butzbach, West Germany
		Report	Nickel 26'; Grabowski 62'; Beverungen 79'; Lorenz 88'; Weidle 90'	Attendance: 3,000; Referee: Kost

9 September 1975	TSV Rohr (West Germany)	0–20	(West Germany) Eintracht Frankfurt	Stuttgart, West Germany
		Report	Grabowski; Hölzenbein; Wenzel; Krobbach; H Müller; Reichel; Nickel; Borchers; Beverungen	Attendance: 2,500

5 October 1975	Viktoria Kelsterbach (West Germany)	1–6	(West Germany) Eintracht Frankfurt	West Germany
	Goal	Report	Wenzel; Borchers; Stradt	Attendance: 500

10 January 1976	Eintracht Frankfurt (West Germany)	3–1	(West Germany) FSV Frankfurt	Frankfurt, West Germany
15:30 CEST	Wenzel 21'; Beverungen 78'; Kraus 88'	Report	Engel 38'	Stadium: Waldstadion; Attendance: 4,000; Referee: Stegner

11 January 1976	VfR Frankenthal (West Germany)	1–5	(West Germany) Eintracht Frankfurt	West Germany
	Roos 60' (pen.)	Report	Nickel 22'; Wenzel 29'; Hölzenbein 36', 65', 78'	Attendance: 3,200; Referee: Kummermehr

6 April 1976	TuS Weilnau (West Germany)	0–14	(West Germany) Eintracht Frankfurt	Wehrheim, West Germany
		Report	Hölzenbein; Grabowski; Stradt; Wenzel; Nickel; Neuberger; Kröll (o.g.)	Attendance: 2,000

22 April 1976	Germania Schwanheim (West Germany)	1–8	(West Germany) Eintracht Frankfurt	Frankfurt, West Germany
	Diefenhard 21'	Report	Beverungen 12', 55'; Stradt 46', 48'; Wenzel 61', 84'; Nickel 64', 82'	Attendance: 1,500

27 April 1976	VfL Biedenkopf (West Germany)	3–8	(West Germany) Eintracht Frankfurt	West Germany
	Goal	Report	Nickel; Reichel; Wenzel; Borchers; Stradt

4 May 1976	TuSpo Ziegenhain (West Germany)	0–13	(West Germany) Eintracht Frankfurt	West Germany
		Report	Grabowski; Beverungen; Nickel; Kraus; Wenzel

18 May 1976	VfR Meerholz (West Germany)	0–7	(West Germany) Eintracht Frankfurt	West Germany
		Report	Nickel; Neuberger; Kraus; Borchers	Attendance: 200

19 May 1976	TVgg Lorsch (West Germany)	1–8	(West Germany) Eintracht Frankfurt	West Germany
	Goal	Report	Wenzel; Borchers; Grabowski; Stradt; Kraus; H Müller	Attendance: 2,000

26 May 1976	East Hesse XI (West Germany)	2–3	(West Germany) Eintracht Frankfurt	Fulda, West Germany
	Vogel 37'; Balzereit 63'	Report	Grabowski 61'; Nickel 68'; Beverungen 71'	Attendance: 2,500

30 May 1976	TSV Vilsbiburg (West Germany)	2–15	(West Germany) Eintracht Frankfurt	West Germany
	Goal	Report	Nickel; Wenzel; Beverungen; Neuberger

8 June 1976	North Hesse XI (West Germany)	0–11	(West Germany) Eintracht Frankfurt	Habichtswald, West Germany
		Report	Hölzenbein; Nickel; Wenzel; Grabowski; Kraus; Körbel

=== Bundesliga ===
==== League fixtures and results ====
9 August 1975 1	Eintracht Frankfurt	0–2	Karlsruher SC	Frankfurt, West Germany
15:30 CEST		Report	Hoffmann 20', 85'	Stadium: Waldstadion; Attendance: 20,000; Referee: Weyland

15 August 1975 2	Werder Bremen	1–2	Eintracht Frankfurt	Bremen, West Germany
20:00 CEST	Görts 48'	Report	Wenzel 39'; Hölzenbein 47'	Stadium: Weserstadion; Attendance: 27,000; Referee: Hennig

23 August 1975 3	Eintracht Frankfurt	3–1	Bayer Uerdingen	Frankfurt, West Germany
15:30 CEST	Grabowski 54'; Hölzenbein 77'; Wenzel 86'	Report	Wloka 10'	Stadium: Waldstadion; Attendance: 13,000; Referee: Quindeau

27 August 1975 4	Fortuna Düsseldorf	1–1	Eintracht Frankfurt	Düsseldorf, West Germany
20:00 CEST	Herzog 21'	Report	Hölzenbein 15'	Stadium: Flinger Broich; Attendance: 30,000; Referee: Linn

30 August 1975 5	Eintracht Frankfurt	2–1	Schalke 04	Frankfurt, West Germany
15:30 CEST	Wenzel 23'; Lorenz 80'	Report	Fischer 34'	Stadium: Waldstadion; Attendance: 31,000; Referee: Jan Redelfs

6 September 1975 6	Kickers Offenbach	2–1	Eintracht Frankfurt	Offenbach, West Germany
15:30 CEST	Ritschel (red card) 6'; Hickersberger 45' (pen.); Held 88'	Report	Hölzenbein 90'	Stadium: Stadion am Bieberer Berg; Attendance: 25,000; Referee: Eschweiler

13 September 1975 7	Eintracht Frankfurt	1–1	Borussia Mönchengladbach	Frankfurt, West Germany
15:30 CEST	Wenzel 5'	Report	Klinkhammer 56'	Stadium: Waldstadion; Attendance: 45,000; Referee: Roth

20 September 1975 8	Hannover 96	3–2	Eintracht Frankfurt	Hanover, West Germany
15:30 CEST	Wolfgang Lüttges 16'; Peter Hayduk 61', 69'	Report	Weidle 56'; Nickel 86'	Stadium: Niedersachsenstadion; Attendance: 31,000; Referee: Weyland

27 September 1975 9	Eintracht Frankfurt	1–1	1. FC Kaiserslautern	Frankfurt, West Germany
15:30 CEST	Hölzenbein 3'	Report	Sandberg 75'	Stadium: Waldstadion; Attendance: 14,000; Referee: Gabor

4 October 1975 10	Hamburger SV	4–2	Eintracht Frankfurt	Hamburg, West Germany
15:30 CEST	Nogly 23'; Bjørnmose 24'; Reimann 39'; Volkert 71' (pen.)	Report	Wenzel 17'; Neuberger 65'	Stadium: Volksparkstadion; Attendance: 43,000; Referee: Waltert

25 October 1975 11	Eintracht Frankfurt	1–1	MSV Duisburg	Frankfurt, West Germany
15:30 CEST	Nickel 12'	Report	Büssers 59'	Stadium: Waldstadion; Attendance: 12,000; Referee: Ohmsen

31 October 1975 12	Rot-Weiss Essen	4–3	Eintracht Frankfurt	Essen, West Germany
20:00 CEST	Lippens 29'; Burgsmüller 55'; Lorant 63', 87'	Report	Wenzel 48', 70'; Lorenz 67'	Stadium: Georg-Melches-Stadion; Attendance: 17,000; Referee: Horstmann

8 November 1975 13	Eintracht Frankfurt	6–0	VfL Bochum	Frankfurt, West Germany
15:30 CEST	Wenzel 25'; Lorenz 48' (pen.); Beverungen 54', 86'; Körbel 60'; Reichel 84'	Report		Stadium: Waldstadion; Attendance: 10,000; Referee: Redelfs

15 November 1975 14	1. FC Köln	3–3	Eintracht Frankfurt	Cologne, West Germany
15:30 CEST	Flohe 49'; Konopka 50'; Simmet 59'	Report	Nickel 15', 57'; Hölzenbein 45'	Stadium: Müngersdorfer Stadion; Attendance: 41,000; Referee: Hermann Schröder

22 November 1975 15	Eintracht Frankfurt	6–0	Bayern Munich	Frankfurt, West Germany
15:30 CEST	Wenzel 8'; Nickel 17', 61'; Grabowski 28'; Hölzenbein 40'; Neuberger 45'	Report		Stadium: Waldstadion; Attendance: 55,000; Referee: Eschweiler

29 November 1975 16	Eintracht Frankfurt	1–1	Hertha BSC	Frankfurt, West Germany
15:30 CEST	Nickel 19'	Report	Kostedde 53'	Stadium: Waldstadion; Attendance: 23,000; Referee: Ahlenfelder

6 December 1975 17	Eintracht Braunschweig	2–0	Eintracht Frankfurt	Braunschweig, West Germany
15:30 CEST	Dremmler 35'; Konschal 79'	Report		Stadium: Stadion an der Hamburger Straße; Attendance: 17,000; Referee: Hennig

17 January 1976 18	Karlsruher SC	1–0	Eintracht Frankfurt	Karlsruhe, West Germany
15:30 CEST	Struth 69'	Report		Stadium: Wildparkstadion; Attendance: 35,000; Referee: Waltert

24 January 1976 19	Eintracht Frankfurt	2–0	Werder Bremen	Frankfurt, West Germany
15:30 CEST	Müllner 58' (o.g.); Kraus 71'	Report		Stadium: Waldstadion; Attendance: 10,000; Referee: Kindervater

7 February 1976 20	Bayer Uerdingen	0–5	Eintracht Frankfurt	Krefeld, West Germany
15:30 CEST		Report	Reichel 34'; Nickel 56' (pen.), 83'; Wenzel 86'; Hölzenbein 89'	Stadium: Grotenburg-Stadion; Attendance: 10,000; Referee: Horstmann

14 February 1976 21	Eintracht Frankfurt	5–2	Fortuna Düsseldorf	Frankfurt, West Germany
15:30 CEST	Nickel 9', 80'; Neuberger 45'; Beverungen 57'; Kraus 85'	Report	Mattsson 3', 24'	Stadium: Waldstadion; Attendance: 7,000; Referee: Biwersi

21 February 1976 22	Schalke 04	2–4	Eintracht Frankfurt	Gelsenkirchen, West Germany
15:30 CEST	E Kremers 18'; Fischer 29'	Report	Hölzenbein 50', 81'; Wenzel 55', 60'	Stadium: Parkstadion; Attendance: 25,000; Referee: Hermann Schröder

6 March 1976 23	Eintracht Frankfurt	1–0	Kickers Offenbach	Frankfurt, West Germany
15:30 CEST	Beverungen 70'	Report		Stadium: Waldstadion; Attendance: 45,000; Referee: Weyland

13 March 1976 24	Borussia Mönchengladbach	4–2	Eintracht Frankfurt	Mönchengladbach, West Germany
15:30 CEST	Wittkamp 35'; Simonsen 43'; Heynckes 64'; Hannes 66'	Report	Neuberger 30'; Grabowski 55'	Stadium: Bökelbergstadion; Attendance: 23,000; Referee: Ohmsen

20 March 1976 25	Eintracht Frankfurt	5–1	Hannover 96	Frankfurt, West Germany
15:30 CEST	Hölzenbein 30'; Körbel 35'; Kraus 45', 48'; Nickel 73'	Report	Stegmayer 89'	Stadium: Waldstadion; Attendance: 10,000; Referee: Ahlenfelder

26 March 1976 26	1. FC Kaiserslautern	3–1	Eintracht Frankfurt	Kaiserslautern, West Germany
20:00 CEST	Toppmöller 5'; Weidle 51' (o.g.); Pirrung 73'	Report	Hölzenbein 86'	Stadium: Betzenbergstadion; Attendance: 28,000; Referee: Eschweiler

10 April 1976 27	Eintracht Frankfurt	1–0	Hamburger SV	Frankfurt, West Germany
15:30 CEST	Wenzel 57'	Report		Stadium: Waldstadion; Attendance: 36,000; Referee: Hennig

17 April 1976 28	MSV Duisburg	1–1	Eintracht Frankfurt	Duisburg, West Germany
15:30 CEST	Büssers 62'	Report	Kraus 44'	Stadium: Wedaustadion; Attendance: 13,000; Referee: Redelfs

30 April 1976 29	Eintracht Frankfurt	1–3	Rot-Weiss Essen	Frankfurt, West Germany
20:00 CEST	Hölzenbein 66'	Report	Hrubesch 8', 80'; Burgsmüller 30'	Stadium: Waldstadion; Attendance: 9,000; Referee: Picker

8 May 1976 30	VfL Bochum	5–3	Eintracht Frankfurt	Herne, West Germany
15:30 CEST	Kaczor 9', 89'; Eggeling 48'; Lameck 67' (pen.); Eggert 80'	Report	Kraus 29'; Hölzenbein 40', 78'	Stadium: Stadion am Schloss Strünkede; Attendance: 18,000; Referee: Biwersi

15 May 1976 31	Eintracht Frankfurt	2–2	1. FC Köln	Frankfurt, West Germany
15:30 CEST	Nickel 4'; Neuberger 33'	Report	Löhr 60'; Hein 84'	Stadium: Waldstadion; Attendance: 15,000; Referee: Redelfs

29 May 1976 32	Bayern Munich	1–1	Eintracht Frankfurt	Munich, West Germany
15:30 CEST	Horsmann 58'	Report	Grabowski 59'	Stadium: Olympiastadion; Attendance: 35,000; Referee: Gabor

4 June 1976 33	Hertha BSC	4–4	Eintracht Frankfurt	Berlin, West Germany
15:30 CEST	Sziedat 14'; Beer 42' (pen.), 82' (pen.); Szymanek 66'	Report	Grabowski 46', 68', 70' (pen.); Beverungen 79'	Stadium: Olympiastadion; Attendance: 11,000; Referee: Wichmann

12 June 1976 34	Eintracht Frankfurt	6–1	Eintracht Braunschweig	Frankfurt, West Germany
15:30 CEST	Grabowski 2', 47', 81'; Hölzenbein 12'; Nickel 45', 78' (pen.)	Report	Frank 83'	Stadium: Waldstadion; Attendance: 11,000; Referee: Linn

==== League table ====
Pos	Team	Pld	W	D	L	GF	GA	GD	Pts	Qualification or relegation
7	1. FC Kaiserslautern	34	15	7	12	66	60	+6	37	Qualification to UEFA Cup first round (Note: As Hamburger SV qualified for the Cup Winners' Cup, their UEFA Cup spot was transferred to DFB-Pokal runners-up 1. FC Kaiserslautern.) (Note: Bayern Munich won the 1975–76 European Cup and thereby automatically qualified as defending champions. As a consequence, their original UEFA Cup spot earned through league placement was transferred to sixth-placed Schalke 04.)
8	Rot-Weiss Essen	34	13	11	10	61	67	−6	37	
9	Eintracht Frankfurt	34	13	10	11	79	58	+21	36	
10	MSV Duisburg	34	13	7	14	55	62	−7	33	
11	Hertha BSC	34	11	10	13	59	61	−2	32	

Source: www.dfb.de
Rules for classification: 1) points; 2) goal difference; 3) number of goals scored.

==== Results summary ====
Overall								Home						Away					
Pld	W	D	L	GF	GA	GD	Pts	W	D	L	GF	GA	GD	W	D	L	GF	GA	GD
34	13	10	11	79	58	+21	36	10	5	2	44	17	+27	3	5	9	35	41	−6

Source: Bundesliga

==== Results by round ====
Round	1	2	3	4	5	6	7	8	9	10	11	12	13	14	15	16	17	18	19	20	21	22	23	24	25	26	27	28	29	30	31	32	33	34
Ground	H	A	H	A	H	A	H	A	H	A	H	A	H	A	H	H	A	A	H	A	H	A	H	A	H	A	H	A	H	A	H	A	A	H
Result	L	W	W	D	W	L	D	L	D	L	D	L	W	D	W	D	L	L	W	W	W	W	W	L	W	L	W	D	L	L	D	D	D	W
Position	16	11	5	6	4	5	5	7	9	13	13	15	10	10	9	10	11	11	11	8	8	5	5	6	6	6	5	7	8	8	8	8	9	9

A = Away; H = Home; W = Win; D = Draw; L = Loss

=== DFB-Pokal ===
1 August 1975 1st Round	Eintracht Frankfurt	6–0	Viktoria Köln	Frankfurt, West Germany
	Hölzenbein 18', 88'; Körbel 34' (pen.); Grabowski 64' (pen.), 89'; Lorenz 74'	Report		Stadium: Waldstadion; Attendance: 9,000; Referee: Meuser

18 October 1975 2nd Round	Offenburger FV	1–5	Eintracht Frankfurt	Offenburg, West Germany
	Bohe 18'	Report	Weidle 10'; Wenzel 15', 34', 59'; Nickel 72'	Attendance: 8,000; Referee: Walz

13 December 1975 3rd Round	Eintracht Frankfurt	3–0	VfL Osnabrück	Frankfurt, West Germany
	Beverungen 8'; Wenzel 55'; Kraus 83'	Report		Stadium: Waldstadion; Attendance: 8,000; Referee: Schumann

31 January 1976 4th Round	Hertha BSC	1–0 (a.e.t.)	Eintracht Frankfurt	Berlin, West Germany
15:30 CEST	Horr 100'	Report		Stadium: Olympiastadion; Attendance: 18,000; Referee: Redelfs

=== European Cup Winners' Cup ===
16 September 1975 1st Round	Eintracht Frankfurt (West Germany)	5–1	(Northern Ireland) Coleraine	Frankfurt, West Germany
20:00 CEST	Körbel 13'; Beverungen 22'; Hölzenbein 28'; Nickel 32', 41'	Report	Cochrane 80'	Stadium: Waldstadion; Attendance: 11,000; Referee: Müncz

30 September 1975 1st Round	Coleraine (Northern Ireland)	2–6	(West Germany) Eintracht Frankfurt	Coleraine, Northern Ireland
16:00 BST	McCurdy 20'; Cochrane 75'	Report	Grabowski 21', 65', 90'; Nickel 27'; Lorenz 35'; Hölzenbein 84'	Stadium: The Showgrounds; Attendance: 3,500; Referee: Beck

22 October 1975 2nd Round	Atlético de Madrid (Spain)	1–2	(West Germany) Eintracht Frankfurt	Madrid, Spain
	Capón 50'	Report	Hölzenbein 6', 14'	Stadium: Estadio Vicente Calderón; Attendance: 30,000; Referee: Burns

5 November 1975 2nd Round	Eintracht Frankfurt (West Germany)	1–0	(Spain) Atlético de Madrid	Frankfurt, West Germany
20:00 CEST	Reichel 88'	Report		Stadium: Waldstadion; Attendance: 45,000; Referee: Schaut

2 March 1976 Quarter-finals	Sturm Graz (Austria)	0–2	(West Germany) Eintracht Frankfurt	Graz, Austria
		Report	Hölzenbein 74'; Wenzel 87'	Stadium: Graz-Liebenau-Stadion; Attendance: 12,000; Referee: Gussoni

16 March 1976 Quarter-finals	Eintracht Frankfurt (West Germany)	1–0	(Austria) Sturm Graz	Frankfurt, West Germany
20:00 CEST	Hölzenbein 85'	Report		Stadium: Waldstadion; Attendance: 18,000; Referee: Garrido

31 March 1976 Semi-finals	Eintracht Frankfurt (West Germany)	2–1	(England) West Ham United	Frankfurt, West Germany
20:00 CEST	Neuberger 29'; Kraus 47'	Report	Paddon 9'	Stadium: Waldstadion; Attendance: 50,000; Referee: Rudnev

14 April 1976 Semi-finals	West Ham United (England)	3–1	(West Germany) Eintracht Frankfurt	London, England
19:30 BST	Brooking 48', 77'; K Robson 68'	Report	Beverungen 88'	Stadium: Boleyn Ground; Attendance: 40,000; Referee: Hungerbühler

=== Indoor soccer tournament (Frankfurt Cup) ===
1 January 1976 1st Match	Eintracht Frankfurt	6–4	1. FC Kaiserslautern	Frankfurt, West Germany
	Goal	Report	Goal	Stadium: Festhalle

2 January 1976 2nd Match	Eintracht Frankfurt	5–5	FSV Frankfurt	Frankfurt, West Germany
	H Müller; Grabowski; Hölzenbein; Nickel	Report	Genz; Stahl; Klein	Stadium: Festhalle; Attendance: 8,000

3 January 1976 3rd Match	Eintracht Frankfurt	3–2	Kickers Offenbach	Frankfurt, West Germany
	Neuberger; H Müller	Report	Janzon	Stadium: Festhalle; Attendance: 8,600

==== Table ====
Pos	Team	Pld	W	D	L	GF	GA	GD	Pts
1	Eintracht Frankfurt	3	2	1	0	14	11	+3	5
2	1. FC Kaiserslautern	3	2	0	1	19	16	+3	4
3	FSV Frankfurt	3	1	1	1	19	15	+4	3
4	Kickers Offenbach	3	0	0	3	9	19	−10	0

Source: RSSSF.com
Rules for classification: 1) Points

== Squad ==
=== Squad and statistics ===
No.	Pos	Nat	Player	Total		Bundesliga		DFB-Pokal		European Cup Winners' Cup	
No.	Pos	Nat	Player	Apps	Goals	Apps	Goals	Apps	Goals	Apps	Goals
	GK	(West Germany) FRG	Jürgen Friedl	1	0	1	0	0	0	0	0
	GK	(West Germany) FRG	Heinz-Josef Koitka	3	0	3	0	0	0	0	0
	GK	(West Germany) FRG	Peter Kunter	12	0	8	0	0	0	4	0
	GK	(West Germany) FRG	Günter Wienhold	32	0	24	0	4	0	4	0
	DF	(West Germany) FRG	Charly Körbel	46	4	34	2	4	1	8	1
	DF	(West Germany) FRG	Peter Krobbach	11	0	9	0	1	0	1	0
	DF	(West Germany) FRG	Helmut Müller	34	0	24	0	4	0	6	0
	DF	(West Germany) FRG	Willi Neuberger	46	6	34	5	4	0	8	1
	DF	(West Germany) FRG	Peter Reichel	41	3	30	2	4	0	7	1
	DF	(West Germany) FRG	Gerd Simons	6	0	4	0	1	0	1	0
	DF	(West Germany) FRG	Gert Trinklein	12	0	11	0	1	0	0	0
	MF	(West Germany) FRG	Klaus Beverungen	39	8	28	5	3	1	8	2
	MF	(West Germany) FRG	Jürgen Grabowski	46	15	34	10	4	2	8	3
	MF	(West Germany) FRG	Wolfgang Kraus	20	8	16	6	2	1	2	1
	MF	(West Germany) FRG	Bernd Nickel	45	19	33	15	4	1	8	3
	MF	(West Germany) FRG	Roland Weidle	40	2	30	1	3	1	7	0
	FW	(West Germany) FRG	Ronny Borchers	1	0	1	0	0	0	0	0
	FW	(West Germany) FRG	Bernd Hölzenbein	46	24	34	16	4	2	8	6
	FW	(West Germany) FRG	Bernd Lorenz	20	5	14	3	2	1	4	1
	FW	(West Germany) FRG	Wilfried Stradt	5	0	3	0	0	0	2	0
	FW	(West Germany) FRG	Rüdiger Wenzel	45	18	33	13	4	4	8	1

=== Transfers ===
In:

No.	Pos.	Nation	Player
—	FW	FRG	Ronny Borchers (from Eintracht Frankfurt academy)
—	GK	FRG	Jürgen Friedl (from Eintracht Frankfurt academy)
—	GK	FRG	Heinz-Josef Koitka (from Wattenscheid 09)
—	DF	FRG	Peter Krobbach (from Hamburger SV)
—	FW	FRG	Rüdiger Wenzel (from FC St. Pauli)

Out:

No.	Pos.	Nation	Player
—	DF	FRG	Hans-Joachim Andree (to Eintracht Bad Kreuznach)
—	DF	FRG	Jürgen Kalb (to Karlsruher SC)
—	FW	FRG	Thomas Rohrbach (to Ethnikos Piraeus)

== Sources ==
- Matheja, Ulrich (2011). Unsere Eintracht - Eintracht Frankfurt - Die Chronik. Die Werkstatt. ISBN 978-3-89533-750-5.
