= Peter Reichel =

German footballer

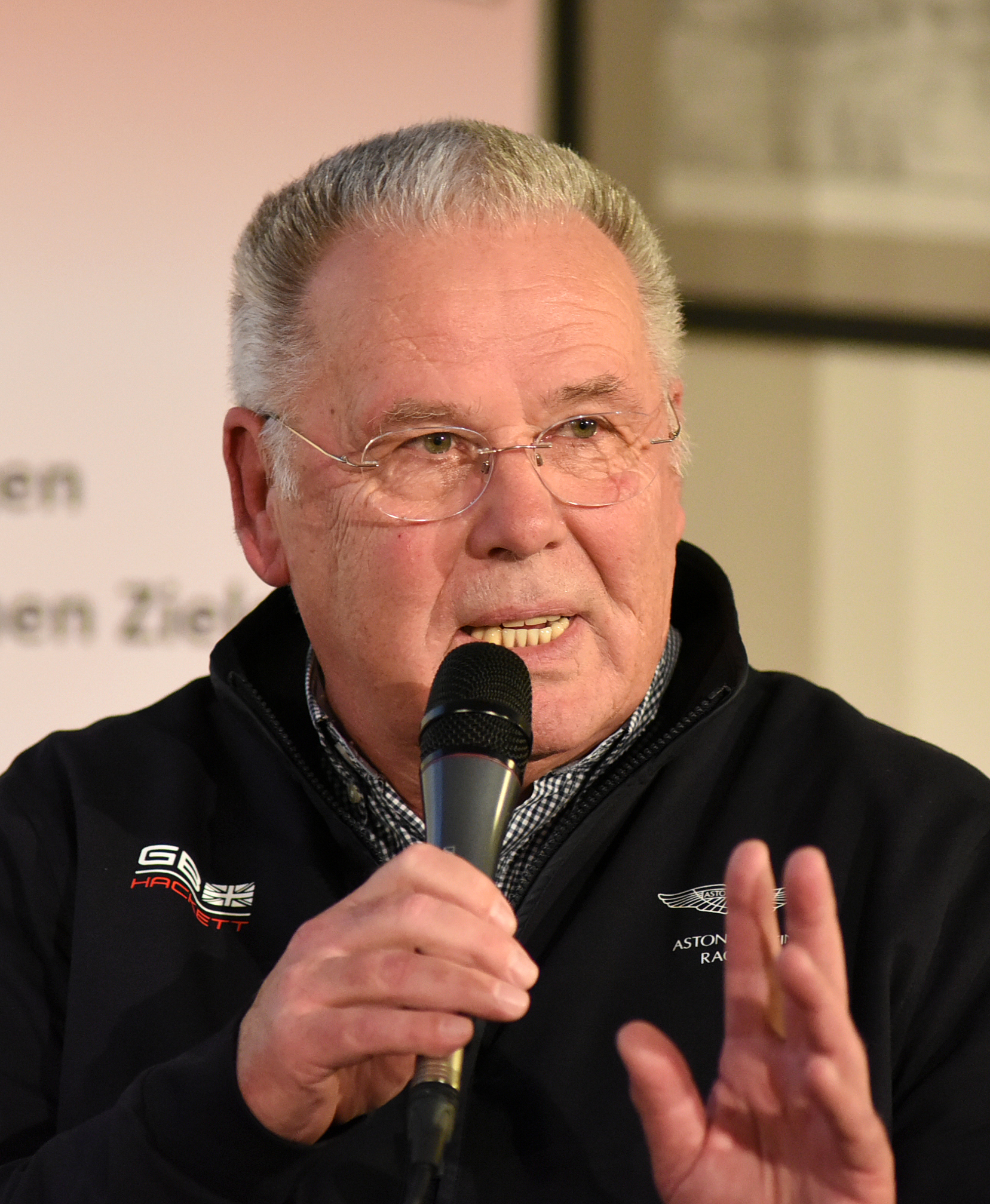

Personal information
- Full name: Peter Reichel
- Date of birth: 30 November 1951 (age 74)
- Place of birth: Gießen, West Germany
- Height: 1.80 m (5 ft 11 in)
- Position: Right-back

Youth career
- 1961–1970: VfB Gießen

Senior career*
Years	Team	Apps	(Gls)
1970–1979	Eintracht Frankfurt	225	(9)

International career
1975–1976	West Germany	2	(0)
- * Club domestic league appearances and goals

Peter Reichel (born 30 November 1951) is a German former professional footballer who played as a right-back.

== Club career ==
The Gießen born Reichel signed a professional contract at Eintracht Frankfurt in 1970. On the first matchday he debuted in the Bundesliga and became immediately a regular. In 1974 and 1975 he won the DFB-Pokal trophy. In 1979, an invalidity stopped him to continue his career at the Eagle squad and he subsequently could only carry on in the reserve team. Totally he amounted 225 Bundesliga appearances, netting nine times.

== International career ==
Bundestrainer Helmut Schön capped him twice for Germany. On 20 December 1975, he came in as a substitute for Bernard Dietz in the 74th minute in a friendly against Turkey. Germany won in Istanbul 5–0. His second cap came on 24 April 1976 in the quarter-final fixture of the Euro 76 in Madrid against Spain. Again he came in for Bernard Dietz. The result was 1–1 and Germany advanced to the semi-finals. However, he was not included in the squad for the final tournament (semi finals and final).

== Honours ==
Eintracht Frankfurt

- DFB-Pokal
  - Winner: 1973–74, 1974–75
