= Rüdiger Wenzel =

German football player (born 1953)

Personal information
- Date of birth: 3 June 1953 (age 73)
- Place of birth: Lübeck, West Germany
- Height: 1.81 m (5 ft 11 in)
- Position: Forward

Youth career
- –1971: VfB Lübeck

Senior career*
Years	Team	Apps	(Gls)
1971–1974	VfB Lübeck	99	(31)
1974–1975	FC St. Pauli	37	(24)
1975–1979	Eintracht Frankfurt	130	(51)
1979–1984	Fortuna Düsseldorf	143	(36)
1984–1990	FC St. Pauli	159	(62)
Total		568	(204)

International career
1977–1979	West Germany B	5	(1)
- * Club domestic league appearances and goals

Rüdiger Wenzel (born 3 June 1953) is a German retired professional footballer, who played as a forward. He scored 91 goals in 300 matches in the Bundesliga.

== Career statistics ==
Appearances and goals by club, season and competition
Club	Season	League			Cup		Europe		Total	
Club	Season	Division	Apps	Goals	Apps	Goals	Apps	Goals	Apps	Goals
VfB Lübeck	1971–72	Regionalliga Nord	33	7	—		—		33	7
VfB Lübeck	1972–73	Regionalliga Nord	32	16	—		—		32	16
VfB Lübeck	1973–74	Regionalliga Nord	34	8	—		—		34	8
VfB Lübeck	Total		99	31	—		—		99	31
FC St. Pauli	1974–75	2. Bundesliga	37	24	3	2	—		40	26
Eintracht Frankfurt	1975–76	Bundesliga	33	13	4	4	8	1	45	18
Eintracht Frankfurt	1976–77	Bundesliga	34	20	5	3	—		39	23
Eintracht Frankfurt	1977–78	Bundesliga	34	14	4	2	6	3	44	19
Eintracht Frankfurt	1978–79	Bundesliga	29	4	5	2	—		34	6
Eintracht Frankfurt	Total		130	51	18	11	14	4	162	66
Fortuna Düsseldorf	1979–80	Bundesliga	31	11	7	5	2	1	40	17
Fortuna Düsseldorf	1980–81	Bundesliga	34	6	5	0	6	2	45	8
Fortuna Düsseldorf	1981–82	Bundesliga	30	8	2	2	—		32	10
Fortuna Düsseldorf	1982–83	Bundesliga	27	7	2	0	—		29	7
Fortuna Düsseldorf	1983–84	Bundesliga	21	4	1	0	—		22	4
Fortuna Düsseldorf	Total		143	36	17	7	8	3	168	46
FC St. Pauli	1984–85	2. Bundesliga	36	12	—		—		36	12
FC St. Pauli	1985–86	Oberliga Nord	32	23	2	0	—		34	23
FC St. Pauli	1986–87	2. Bundesliga	32	7	3	2	—		35	9
FC St. Pauli	1987–88	2. Bundesliga	32	16	1	0	—		33	16
FC St. Pauli	1988–89	Bundesliga	15	3	0	0	—		15	3
FC St. Pauli	1989–90	Bundesliga	12	1	1	0	—		13	1
FC St. Pauli	Total		159	62	7	2	—		166	64
Career total			568	204	45	22	22	7	635	233

== Honours ==
Fortuna Düsseldorf

- DFB-Pokal: 1979–80

FC St. Pauli

- Oberliga Nord: 1985–86

Individual

- Goal of the Month: March 1989
