= Hartmut Konschal =

German footballer and coach (born 1953)

Personal information
- Date of birth: 2 April 1953 (age 73)
- Place of birth: Salzgitter, West Germany
- Positions: Striker; defender

Youth career
- –1971: Union Salzgitter

Senior career*
Years	Team	Apps	(Gls)
1971–1976	Eintracht Braunschweig	102	(14)
1976–1981	Werder Bremen	158	(16)
1981–1982	Freiburger FC	20	(1)
Total		180	(31)

Managerial career
- 2005: Brinkumer SV
- * Club domestic league appearances and goals

Hartmut Konschal (born 2 April 1953) is a German football coach and a former player. As a player, he spent nine seasons in the Bundesliga with Eintracht Braunschweig and SV Werder Bremen.
