= Eintracht Frankfurt =

Association football club in Germany

- Full name: Eintracht Frankfurt e. V.
- Nicknames: SGE (Sportgemeinde Eintracht); Die Adler (The Eagles); Launische Diva (Moody Diva); Schlappekicker (Slipper Kickers); Die Diva vom Main (The Diva From the Main)
- Founded: 8 March 1899; 127 years ago
- Stadium: Deutsche Bank Park
- Capacity: 60,100
- President: Mathias Beck
- Head coach: Adi Hütter
- League: Bundesliga
- 2025–26: Bundesliga, 8th of 18
- Website: eintracht.de
Home colours	Away colours	Third colours

Eintracht Frankfurt e.V. (German pronunciation: [ˈaɪntʁaxt ˈfʁaŋkfʊʁt]) is a German professional sports club based in Frankfurt, Hesse. It is best known for its football club, which was founded on 8 March 1899. The club currently plays in the Bundesliga, the top tier of the German football league system. Eintracht have won the German championship once, the DFB-Pokal five times, the UEFA Europa League twice and finished as runner-up in the European Cup (now known as the Champions League) once. The team was one of the founding members of the Bundesliga at its inception and has spent a total of 57 seasons in the top division, thus making them the seventh longest participating club in the highest tier of the league.

The club has 155,000 members, and thus is the fourth largest club playing in German football.

Since 1925 their stadium has been the Waldstadion, which is currently named Deutsche Bank Park for sponsorship reasons.

Eintracht Frankfurt have either won or drawn more than three-quarters of their games as well as having finished the majority of their seasons placed in the top half of the table, but also having the highest number of losses in the league (717). With an average attendance of 59,071 in the 2025-26 Bundesliga season, the 4th highest attendance in the league. The player with the highest number of appearances (602) in the Bundesliga, Charly Körbel, spent his entire senior career as a defender for Eintracht Frankfurt. The club's primary rival is local club Kickers Offenbach, although, due to spending most of their history in different divisions, the two have only played two league matches within the last 40 years.

With almost 14,000 active athletes in over 50 sports in 2024, Eintracht Frankfurt is the largest multi-sports club in the world with a professional football team.

== History ==
=== Club origins ===
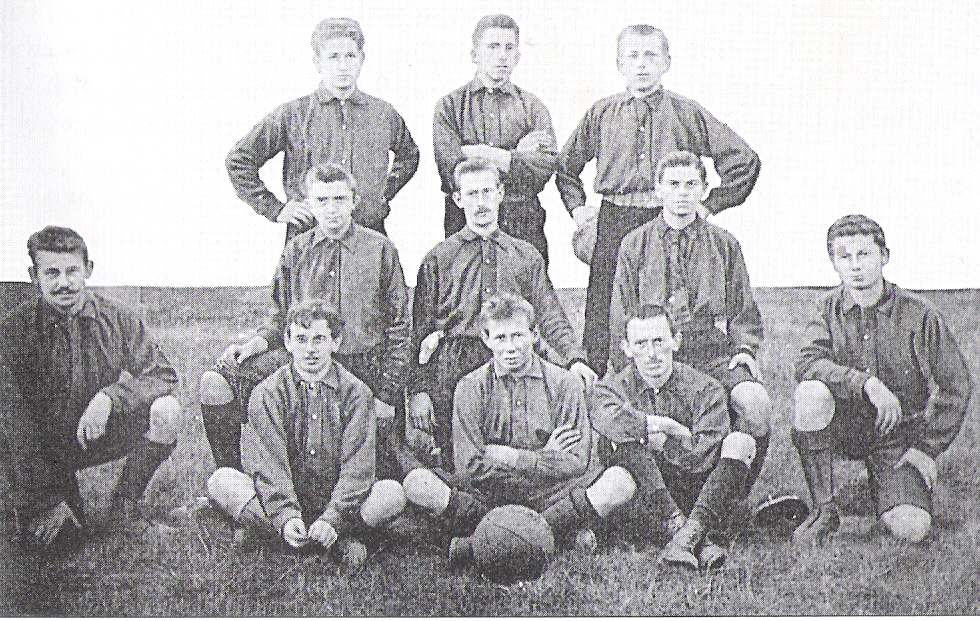
The first team of Frankfurter Fußball-Club Victoria in 1899

The origins of the club go back to a pair of football clubs founded in 1899: Frankfurter Fußball-Club Victoria von 1899 – regarded as the original team in the club's history – and Frankfurter Fußball-Club Kickers von 1899. Both clubs were founding members of the new Nordkreis-Liga in 1909. These two teams merged in May 1911 to become Frankfurter Fußball Verein (Kickers-Victoria), an instant success, taking three league titles from 1912 to 1914 in the Nordkreis-Liga and qualifying for the Southern German championship in each of those seasons. In turn, Frankfurter FV joined the gymnastics club Frankfurter Turngemeinde von 1861 to form TuS Eintracht Frankfurt von 1861 in 1920. The German word Eintracht means 'harmony' or 'concord', and so Eintracht is the equivalent of United in English in the names of sports teams.

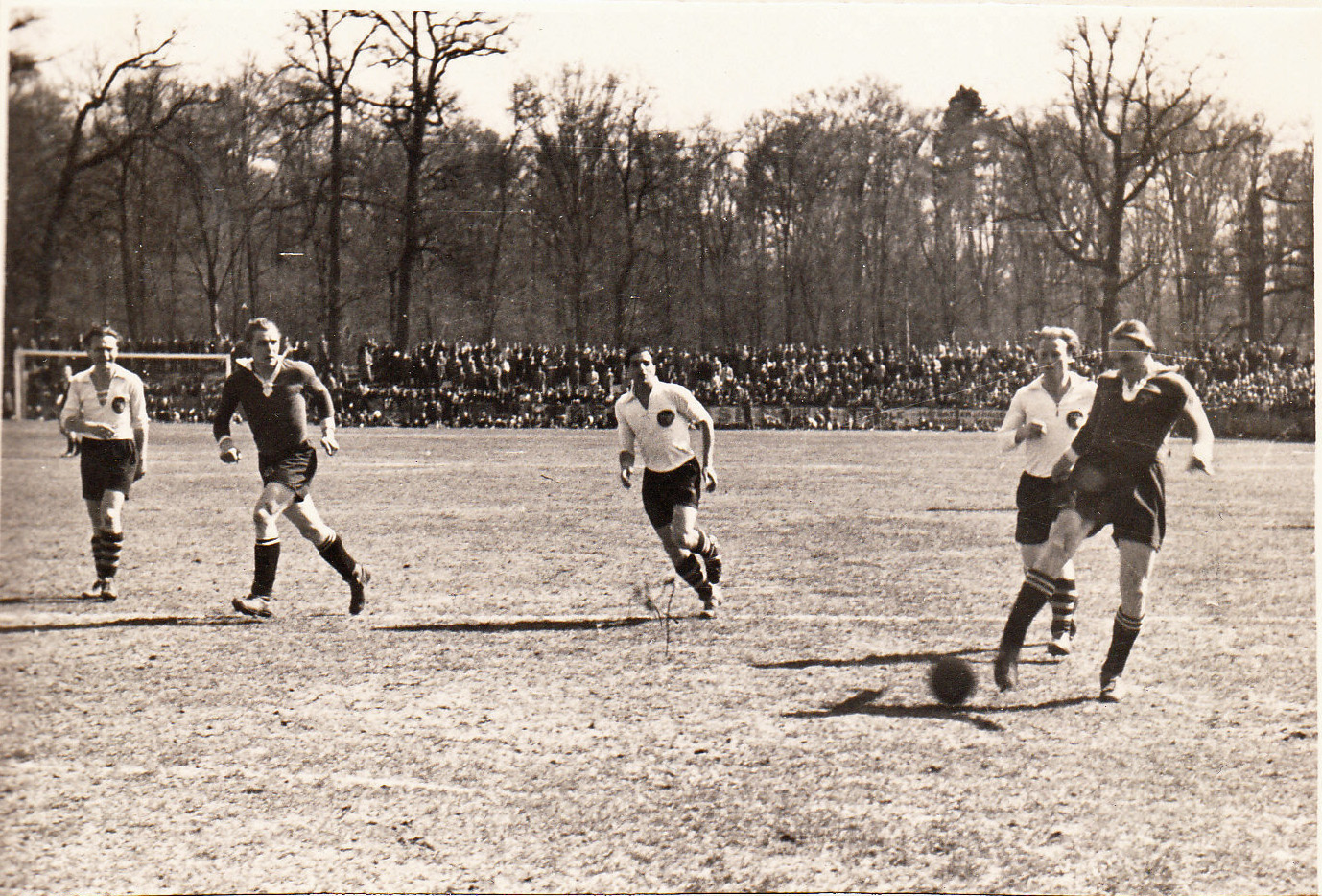
Oberliga Süd match in 1946: Karlsruher FV v Eintracht Frankfurt

At the time, sports in Germany was dominated by nationalistic gymnastics organizations, and under pressure from that sport's governing authority, the gymnasts and footballers went their separate ways again in 1927, as Turngemeinde Eintracht Frankfurt von 1861 and Sportgemeinde Eintracht Frankfurt (FFV) von 1899.

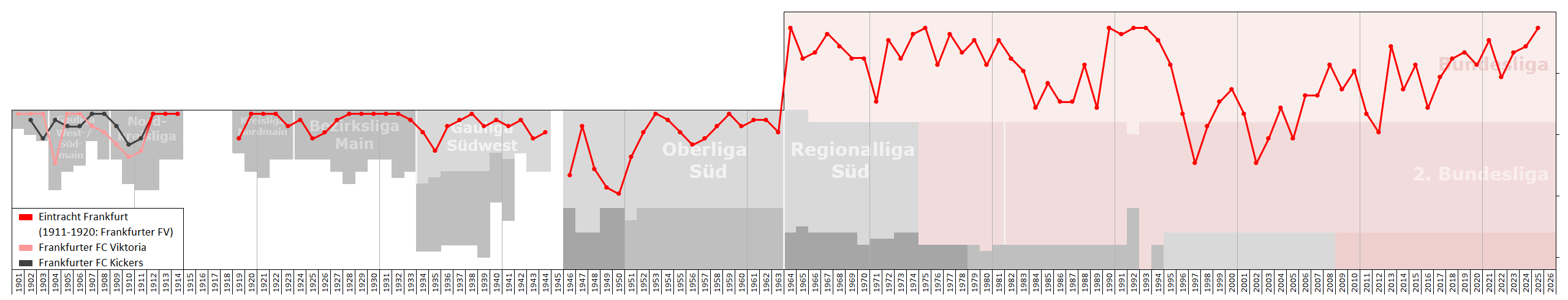
Historical chart of Eintracht Frankfurt league performance

Through the late 1920s and into the 1930s, Eintracht won a handful of local and regional championships, first in the Kreisliga Nordmain, then in the Bezirksliga Main and Bezirksliga Main-Hessen. After being eliminated from the national level playoffs after quarterfinal losses in 1930 and 1931, they won their way to the final in 1932 where they were beaten 2–0 by Bayern Munich, who claimed their first ever German championship. In 1933, German football was re-organized into sixteen Gauligen under the Third Reich, and the club played first division football in the Gauliga Südwest, consistently finishing in the upper half of the table and winning their division in 1938.

Eintracht picked up where they left off after World War II, joining the new first division Oberliga Süd. In 1946, Eintracht won the first Hessenpokal, and finished third in the Oberliga Süd a year later. In 1953, they would win the Oberliga Süd title, qualifying Eintracht for the German championship, though they did not make it to the final.

=== National champions and European Cup finalists ===
Former coach Paul Oßwald returned to the club for a third stint with Eintracht in 1958. In the 1958–59 season the club won their Oberliga again, qualifying for the 1959 German championship. Winning all six of the games in the group phase, Eintracht made it to the final with a perfect record; there, they would meet rivals Kickers Offenbach, the club that Oßwald joined from, and the runners up behind Eintracht in the Oberliga Süd. Frankfurt went on to win the final 5–3 after extra time, becoming German champions for the first and so far only time in front of 75,000 fans in Berlin's Olympiastadion.

As champions, Frankfurt would represent Germany in the 1959–60 European Cup, where they would come to international prominence. Having beaten BSC Young Boys and Wiener Sport-Club to make it to the semi-finals, they were drawn against Scottish champions Rangers, who were considered favourites, at least in Scotland – Rangers manager Scot Symon allegedly asked, "Eintracht, who are they?" before the game. Eintracht won the first leg 6–1 at home, in a performance described as the greatest in the club's history. They would score six more in the second leg at Ibrox, winning 12–4 on aggregate. After the game, the Rangers players gave their opponents a guard of honour as they left the pitch.

Eintracht would return to Glasgow for the final at Hampden Park, although they lost 7–3 to Real Madrid despite taking an early lead. The final was widely regarded as one of the best football matches ever played, remembered for a hat-trick by Alfredo Di Stéfano and four goals by Ferenc Puskás.

After their championship-winning year, Eintracht did not win the Oberliga again, though they were runners-up in 1961 and 1962. Both times they would finish second in the group phase of the German championship, missing out on the final.

=== Founding member of the Bundesliga ===
The side earned themselves a place as one of the original 16 teams selected to play in the Bundesliga, Germany's new professional football league, formed in 1963. Eintracht played Bundesliga football for 33 consecutive seasons, finishing in the top half of the table for the majority of them. In the inaugural season, Eintracht finished 3rd behind 1. FC Köln and Meidericher SV – the club has still never managed a better Bundesliga finish – and also reached the 1964 DFB-Pokal Final.

Eintracht finished in the top half of the Bundesliga every season until 1970–71. Although they didn't make it back to the European Cup, Eintracht did play in other non-UEFA European competitions, beating FK Inter Bratislava to win the 1967 Intertoto Cup in the last season of its original format. That year, they also reached the semi-final of the Inter-Cities Fairs Cup, losing to Dinamo Zagreb.

=== Cup successes ===
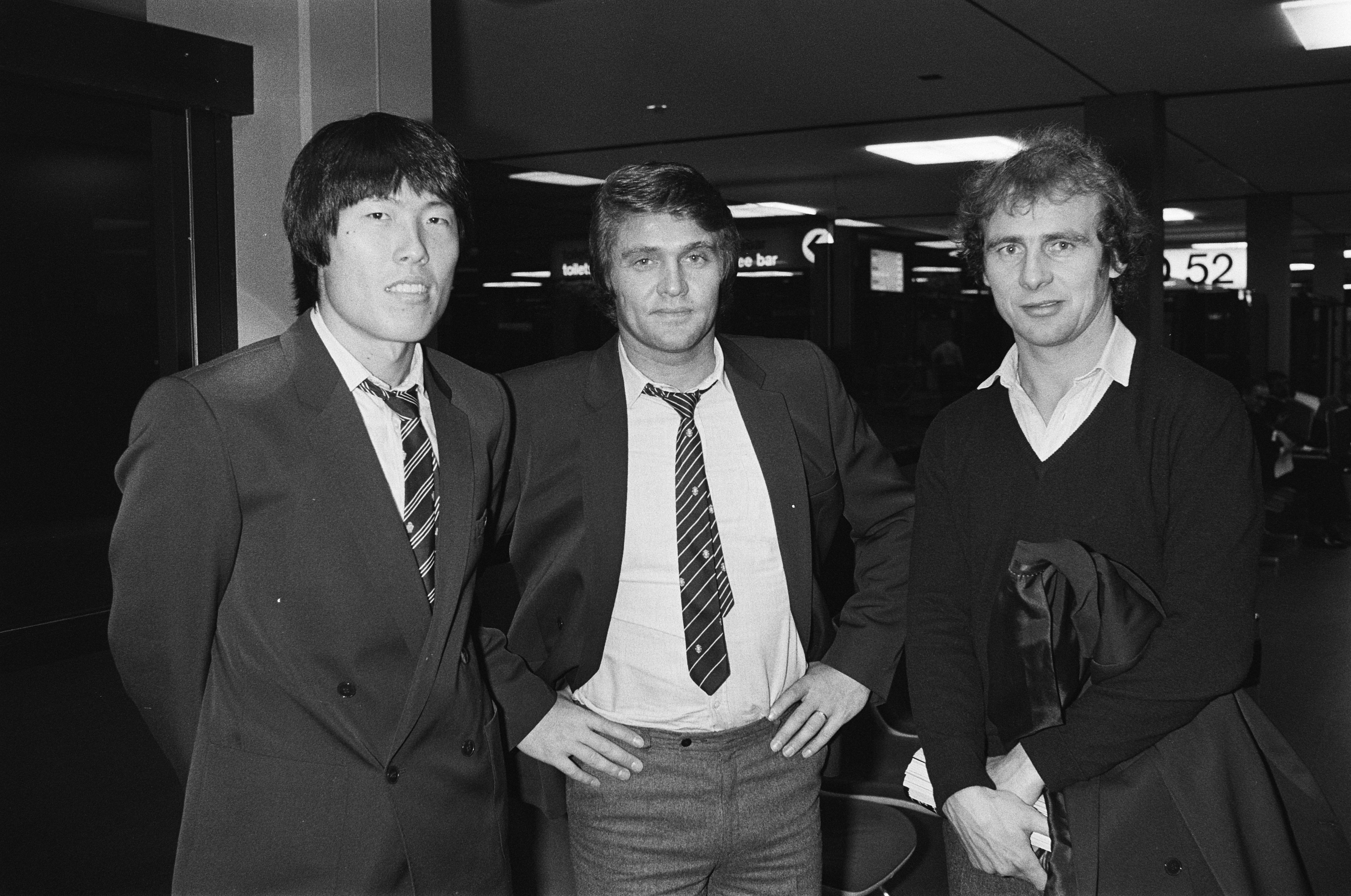
Cha Bum-kun, coach Friedel Rausch, and Bernd Hölzenbein during Eintracht's successful 1979–80 UEFA Cup campaign

From 1973 to 1981, Eintracht had arguably their most successful period of the Bundesliga era, winning three DFB-Pokals and the UEFA Cup. Many of the most iconic players from the club's history played during this era, such as Bernd Nickel, Charly Körbel, Bernd Hölzenbein, Jürgen Grabowski and Cha Bum-kun.

The first title success came under Dietrich Weise in the 1973–74 DFB-Pokal, winning 3–1 in the final over Hamburger SV – due to the 1974 FIFA World Cup, which Hölzenbein and Grabowski had won with West Germany, the final was not played until August 1974.

Eintracht would win the cup again in 1975, beating MSV Duisburg 1–0. That season, they played in the European Cup Winners' Cup for the first time, and in the 1975–76 campaign, they would go far, reaching the semi-finals. Despite beating West Ham 2–1 at home, Eintracht were beaten 3–1 in the second leg and were knocked out, while also finishing a relatively low ninth place in the Bundesliga. The club then had a difficult start to the 1976–77 season, but under new coach Gyula Lóránt, appointed in November, Eintracht went unbeaten in the second half of the season. Lóránt, notable for introducing zonal marking to the Bundesliga, took Frankfurt into fourth place by the end of the season, finishing only two points behind champions Borussia Mönchengladbach. Soon, however, Lóránt would leave for Bayern Munich, with Dettmar Cramer coming the other way to coach Frankfurt. Cramer left at the end of the disappointing 1977–78 season, replaced by Otto Knefler, who soon had to leave on health grounds.

In January 1979, Friedel Rausch joined the club as head coach. This was one of two important arrivals in 1979, as Cha Bum-kun would sign for Eintracht in July, becoming the first Korean to play in Europe. He would quickly become an icon in Frankfurt, scoring 12 league goals in his debut season. Eliminating Aberdeen, Dinamo București, Feyenoord and FC Zbrojovka Brno in the earlier rounds of the UEFA Cup, Eintracht reached the semi-finals, at which point only West German teams remained. Drawn against Bayern Munich, they won 5–1 in extra time to earn a place in the final.

Eintracht lost 3–2 in the first leg of the final to Borussia Mönchengladbach, the reigning champions. The two away goals, scored by Harald Karger and Hölzenbein, would prove crucial. Two weeks later, they hosted the return leg. With the score still at 0–0, Friedel Rausch sent on teenager Fred Schaub with 13 minutes to play. Almost immediately, Schaub scored what proved to be only goal of the game, winning Eintracht the title on away goals.

As Lothar Buchmann succeeded Rausch, Eintracht won their third DFB-Pokal in 1981. This effectively marked the end of Eintracht's golden period, as they began their battle with relegation.

=== Mid-80s struggles and 1988 DFB-Pokal ===
In 1984, they defeated MSV Duisburg 6–1 on aggregate in the relegation playoff after finishing 16th; in 1986 and 1987, they would finish 15th.

After years as a bottom-half club in the Bundesliga, Eintracht had a successful 1987–88 season, finishing in the top half of the league for the first time since 1982. More importantly, they won the 1987–88 DFB-Pokal, with a 1–0 win over VfL Bochum in the 1988 final. The goalscorer was Hungarian Lajos Détári, who became a hero among the club's fans. Only two days after the final, Détári was sold to Olympiacos for a large fee, helping to pay the club's debts.

In 1988–89 Eintracht found themselves in the relegation fight again. Jörg Berger was appointed coach and led the side to safety with a 4–1 aggregate win over 1. FC Saarbrücken in the relegation playoff.

=== Title challenges in the early 90s and first relegation ===
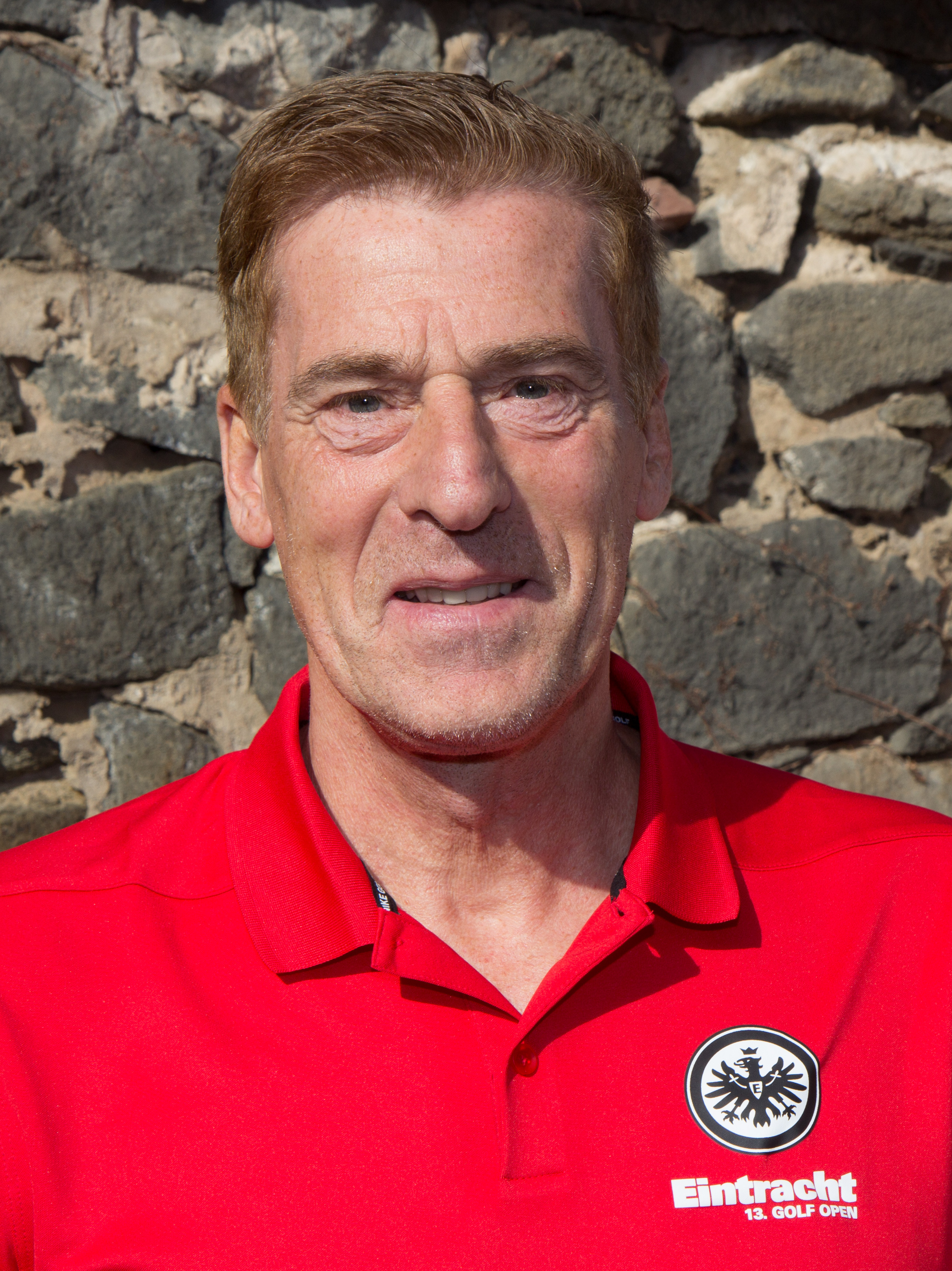
Uli Stein

A year later, Berger had taken the club to 3rd place, and was recognised as the best coach in the league. Berger left in 1991 after a 4th-place finish, but the squad now included players considered among the Bundesliga's best, such as Uwe Bein, Uli Stein, Jørn Andersen, Manfred Binz, Tony Yeboah and Andreas Möller.

Dragoslav Stepanović took over as coach when Berger left, and Eintracht would finish 3rd in both seasons he coached, although he left before the end of 1992–93. Under Stepanović, Eintracht played what was considered some of the best football in Bundesliga history, making 'Stepi' a fan favourite to this day. In 1991–92, the club came closer than ever before to winning the Bundesliga. Going into the last game of the season, Eintracht were top of the table and only needed a win against already-relegated Hansa Rostock. With the scores level at 1–1 Eintracht were denied what seemed a clear penalty, they would go on to lose 2–1. Referee Alfons Berg later apologised for his decision, but VfB Stuttgart became champions. Eintracht also came close in 1993–94, under Klaus Toppmöller, leading the table at the halway point; however, they fell to 5th place and Toppmöller was sacked.

In the summer of 1994, Jupp Heynckes was appointed coach. Things quickly began to turn sour, as Heynckes fell out with key players Tony Yeboah, Maurizio Gaudino and Jay-Jay Okocha. The club suspended all three players; Yeboah and Gaudino soon left. With the club in 13th, Heynckes decided to leave. For his role in breaking up the successful side of the early 90s, Heynckes is still disliked by many fans in Frankfurt.

Relegation would come in 1995–96, with neither club legend Charly Körbel or the previously successful Dragoslav Stepanovic able to rescue Eintracht. After 33 consecutive years in the Bundesliga, Frankfurt went down alongside 1. FC Kaiserslautern, who had also been ever-present until 1996.

=== Turbulent years ===
After a tumultuous debut campaign in the 2. Bundesliga, Eintracht won the title in 1997–98 and returned to the Bundesliga. Promotion coach Horst Ehrmantraut left in December, and Jörg Berger returned to try to save Eintracht once more. On the final day of the 1998–99 season, Eintracht were expected to be relegated, but dramatically climbed out of the relegation zone on goal difference thanks to a late goal from Jan Åge Fjørtoft giving them a 5–1 win over Kaiserslautern.

The following year, in another struggle to avoid relegation, the club was docked two points for violating the conditions of their license. Eintracht secured survival on the last day of the season with a win over SSV Ulm, who were relegated instead. Eintracht would go down the season afterwards with Friedel Rausch in charge, and did not come close to promotion in 2001–02.

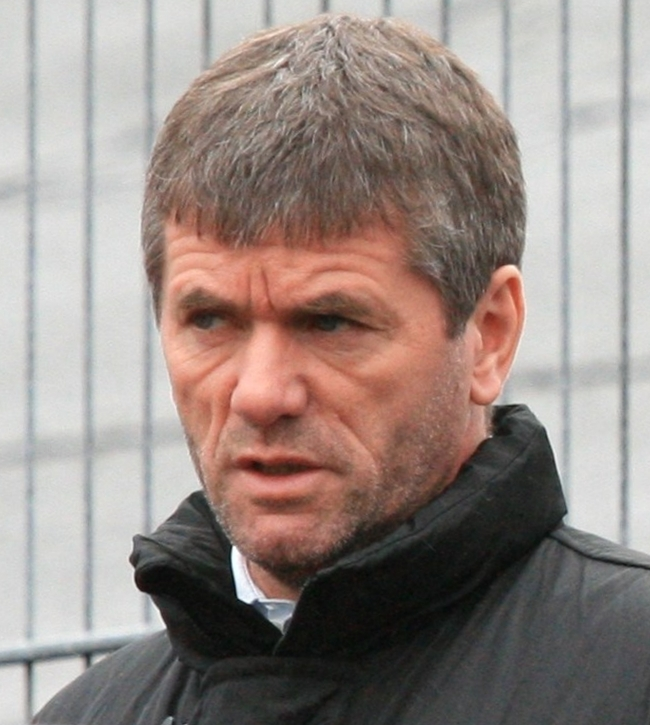
Friedhelm Funkel as Eintracht Frankfurt coach

Eintracht secured a Bundesliga return on the final day of the 2002–03 season with a 6–3 win over Reutlingen, dramatically scoring 3 in the last 10 minutes of the game. They were then relegated straight back to the 2. Bundesliga, but were promoted again the season after, managed by Friedhelm Funkel. Funkel led the team to safety in 2005–06 and also took Eintracht to the DFB-Pokal final for the first time since 1988, where they lost to Bayern Munich. As Bayern had already qualified for Europe, this also meant that Eintracht qualified for the UEFA Cup. After years of stability under Funkel, Michael Skibbe replaced him in 2009.

The 2010–11 season ended with the club's fourth Bundesliga relegation. After setting a new record for most points in the first half of the season, the club struggled after the winter break, going seven games without scoring a goal. Coach Skibbe was replaced with Christoph Daum, but Eintracht were relegated again after winning just once in the second half of the season.

One year later, Eintracht defeated Alemannia Aachen 3–0 on the 32nd matchday of the 2011–12 season, securing promotion to the Bundesliga. This was followed up by a 6th-place finish in the Bundesliga in 2012–13, qualifying Frankfurt for the Europa League.

=== DFB Pokal and Europa League winners, participation in European competitions ===
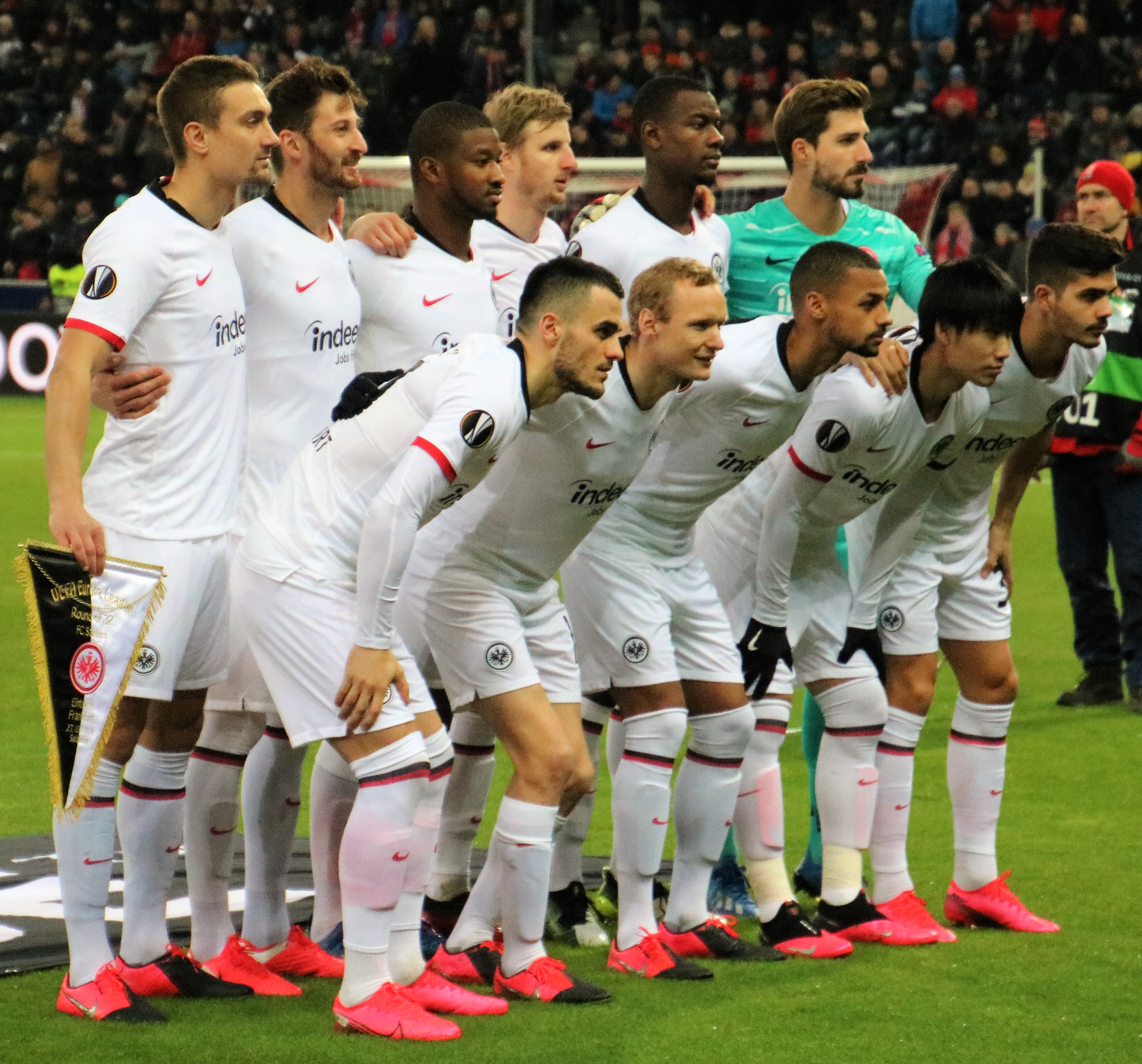
Eintracht Frankfurt before the Europa League match at FC Salzburg on 28 February 2020

Having finished in the top half in 2014–15, a season in which Eintracht's Alexander Meier was the league's top scorer, the team struggled again in 2015–16 and Niko Kovač was appointed coach in March 2016. Frankfurt survived only through the relegation playoff; ending the season in 16th place, they beat 1. FC Nürnberg 2–1 on aggregate in the playoff. In Kovač's first full year, his team survived comfortably and also reached the final of the 2017 DFB-Pokal, where they were beaten by Borussia Dortmund.

Eintracht reached their second DFB-Pokal final in a row in 2017–18, this time winning 3–1 against heavy favourites Bayern Munich – who Kovač had already agreed to join from next season. He was replaced by Adi Hütter.

In 2018–19, Eintracht's attacking trio of Luka Jović, Ante Rebić and Sébastien Haller won lots of praise for their outstanding performances, scoring 41 league goals and 16 Europa League goals between them and earning the nickname "the Buffalo Herd". Making only their second appearance in the modern Europa League, Eintracht won all six group games against Lazio, Apollon Limassol and Marseille, and beat highly rated opponents Shakhtar Donetsk, Inter Milan and Benfica. In the semi-finals against Chelsea, Eintracht drew both legs 1–1 but ended up losing on penalties at Stamford Bridge. Chelsea would go on to win the tournament. Eintracht also missed out on Champions League qualification in the Bundesliga, dropping from 4th to 7th after losing their last two games.

With Jović, Rebić and Haller all leaving in the summer of 2019, Eintracht regressed in 2019–20 and failed to qualify for Europe, but returned to the Europa League with a 5th-place finish in 2020–21, after which Adi Hütter left for Borussia Mönchengladbach. In the 2021–22 Europa League, Eintracht topped their group and stunned Barcelona in the quarter finals, taking a 3–0 lead at the Camp Nou and eventually winning 3–2 with approximately 30,000 travelling Frankfurt fans in attendance. Eintracht went on to beat West Ham home and away in the semi-finals to set up their first European final since 1980.

In the final in Seville's Ramón Sánchez Pizjuán Stadium, Frankfurt beat Rangers 5–4 on penalties after a 1–1 draw in extra-time, with Rafael Santos Borré scoring Eintracht's goal and the winning penalty. Goalkeeper Kevin Trapp was named man of the match in the final after making a crucial late save from Ryan Kent and saving Aaron Ramsey's penalty in the shootout. Eintracht won the competition unbeaten; their success also qualified them for the 2022–23 UEFA Champions League, Eintracht's first appearance in the competition since 1960. Eintracht finished second in their Champions League group, qualifying for the knockout stages, but lost in the round of 16 against S.S.C. Napoli. The team was more successful in the 2022–23 DFB-Pokal, reaching the final on 3 June 2023, where they lost 2–0 against RB Leipzig. A 7th-place finish at the end of 2022–23 season secured qualification for the UEFA Europa Conference League.

Since November 2024, the executive board consists of Axel Hellmann (CEO), Markus Krösche (head of sports) and Julien Zamberk (head of finances) and Philipp Reschke (head of fan relations, merchandising and HR).

== Colours, crest and nicknames ==
The Eintracht crest is based on the city coat of arms.

The club crest derives from the coat of arms of the city of Frankfurt, which itself is a reference to the one-headed Imperial Eagle of the 13th century.

The crest has evolved showing little significant change until 1980, when a stylized eagle in black and white was chosen to represent the team. In Eintracht's centenary year of 1999, the club decided to re-adopt a more traditional eagle crest. Since 2005, Eintracht has had a living mascot, a golden eagle named Attila from the nearby Hanau Zoo,

Centennial kit in 1999–2000

The official club colours of red, black, and white have their origins in the colours of the founding clubs Frankfurter FC Viktoria and Frankfurter FC Kickers, which sported red and white and black and white respectively. Red and white are the colours of the city coat of arms, and black and white the colours of Prussia. When the clubs merged, officials decided to adopt the colours of both sides. Since local rival Kickers Offenbach sport the colours red and white, Eintracht avoids playing in such a kit, preferring to play in black and red, or in black and white. In the 2023–2024 season, the home kit is black and red.

In the 2021–22 UEFA Europa League, the Eagles played an unbeaten campaign, mostly sporting an all-white kit that gained them the nickname la bestia blanca (literally the white beast in Spanish), a wordplay on the Spanish term la bestia negra (literally the black beast, also meaning bogey team in Spanish). This nickname was received after Eintracht knocked FC Barcelona out of the competition at Camp Nou.

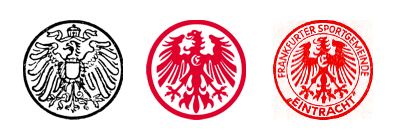
Eintracht's eagle (Adler) over the years: the logo of Frankfurter FV 1911 and the red eagle of TuS Eintracht Frankfurt 1920 and Sportgemeinde Eintracht Frankfurt 1967 before today's more traditional style logo was adopted

The club is nicknamed "Die Adler" ("The Eagles"), which derives from their logo. A nickname still popular among supporters is SGE, taken from the club's old official name Sportgemeinde Eintracht (Frankfurt), which roughly translates into English as "Sports Community Harmony."

The nickname Launische Diva ("Moody Diva") was heard most often in the early 1990s, when the club would comfortably defeat top teams only to surprisingly lose to lesser clubs.

The nickname Schlappekicker ("Slipper Kickers") has been around since the 1920s, when J. & C. A. Schneider, a local manufacturer of shoes and especially slippers (called Schlappe in the regional Hessian dialect) was a major financial backer of the club and helped propel it to national relevance.

== Honours ==
=== National ===
- German Championship / Bundesliga
  - Champions (1): 1959
  - Runners-up (1): 1932
- 2. Bundesliga
  - Winners (1): 1997–98
  - Runners-up (1): 2011–12
- DFB-Pokal
  - Winners (5): 1973–74, 1974–75, 1980–81, 1987–88, 2017–18
  - Runners-up (4): 1963–64, 2005–06, 2016–17, 2022–23
- DFB / DFL-Supercup
  - Runners-up (2): 1988, 2018

=== Continental ===
- European Cup / UEFA Champions League
  - Runners-up (1): 1959–60
- UEFA Cup / UEFA Europa League
  - Winners (2): 1979–80, 2021–22
- International Football Cup (Intertoto Cup)
  - Winners (1): 1966–67
- UEFA Super Cup
  - Runners-up (1): 2022

=== Pre-season ===
- Cup of the Alps
  - Winners: 1967
- Fuji-Cup
  - Winners: 1992
  - Runners-up: 1994
- Trofeo Bortolotti
  - Winners: 2016, 2022

=== Regional ===
- Southern German Championship
  - Champions: 1929–30, 1931–32
  - Runners-up: 1912–13+, 1913–14+, 1927–28, 1930–31
- Oberliga Süd
  - Champions: 1952–53, 1958–59
  - Runners-up: 1953–54, 1960–61, 1961–62
- Nordkreis-Liga
  - Champions: 1911–12+, 1912–13+, 1913–14+
- Kreisliga Nordmain
  - Champions: 1919–20+, 1920–21
  - Runners-up: 1921–22
- Bezirksliga Main-Hessen:
  - Champions: 1927–28, 1928–29, 1929–30, 1930–31, 1931–32
  - Runners-up: 1932–33
- Gauliga Südwest/Mainhessen:
  - Champions: 1937–38
  - Runners-up: 1936–37
- Hesse Cup (Tiers 3–7):
  - Winners: 1946, 1969^{*}
  - Runners-up: 1949
- Hesse Championship (Tier 3, 4 & 5):
  - Champions: 1970^{*}, 2002^{*}, 2023^{*}
  - Runners-up: 1978^{*}, 1983^{*}, 1995^{*}
- + As Frankfurter FV
- ^{*} Achieved by Reserve Team

== League results ==
=== Domestic ===
==== All time ====
Green denotes the highest level of football in Germany; yellow the second highest.

=== European ===
==== UEFA club coefficient ranking ====
As of 1 May 2026

Rank	Nation	Team	Points
15	(Portugal)	Sporting CP	84.000
16	(Italy)	Atalanta	84.000
17	(Germany)	Eintracht Frankfurt	83.000
18	(England)	Tottenham Hotspur	82.000
19	(Portugal)	Porto	80.750

== Players ==
=== Current squad ===
As of 1 November 2026

Note: Flags indicate national team as defined under FIFA eligibility rules; some limited exceptions apply. Players may hold more than one non-FIFA nationality.

No.	Pos.	Nation	Player
1	GK	GER	Noah Atubolu (on loan from SC Freiburg)
2	DF	GER	Elias Baum
3	DF	TOG	Lilian Brassier
4	DF	GER	Robin Koch (captain)
5	DF	BRA	Otávio
6	MF	DEN	Oscar Højlund
7	FW	GER	Ansgar Knauff
8	MF	ALG	Farès Chaïbi
9	FW	GER	Jonathan Burkardt
11	FW	GER	Younes Ebnoutalib
15	MF	GER	Noël Aséko
20	FW	JPN	Ritsu Dōan
22	DF	USA	Timothy Chandler
23	MF	GER	Niko Iličević

No.	Pos.	Nation	Player
25	MF	NGR	Raphael Onyedika
26	DF	JPN	Keita Kosugi
27	MF	GER	Mario Götze (vice-captain)
29	FW	MAR	Ayoube Amaimouni
31	MF	SWE	Love Arrhov
33	GK	GER	Jens Grahl
34	DF	GER	Nnamdi Collins
35	FW	DEN	Malik Pimpong
37	DF	GER	Jeremiaha Maluze
39	GK	BIH	Amil Šiljević
40	GK	BRA	Kauã Santos
42	FW	TUR	Can Uzun
44	FW	GER	Jessic Ngankam

=== Players out on loan ===
Note: Flags indicate national team as defined under FIFA eligibility rules; some limited exceptions apply. Players may hold more than one non-FIFA nationality.

No.	Pos.	Nation	Player
—	DF	MLI	Fousseny Doumbia (at Energie Cottbus until 30 June 2027)
—	DF	GER	Ouassim Karada (at Hansa Rostock until 30 June 2027)
—	DF	FRA	Niels Nkounkou (at Nice until 30 June 2027)
—	DF	BEL	Arthur Theate (at Bologna until 30 June 2027)
—	MF	SWE	Hugo Larsson (at Fulham until 30 June 2027)

No.	Pos.	Nation	Player
—	MF	HUN	Krisztián Lisztes (at Ferencváros until 30 June 2027)
—	FW	FRA	Jean-Mattéo Bahoya (at Leeds United until 30 June 2027)
—	FW	GER	Noel Futkeu (at SV Elversberg until 30 June 2027)
—	FW	GER	Alexander Staff (at 1. FC Saarbrücken until 30 June 2027)
—	FW	CIV	Elye Wahi (at Nice until 30 June 2027)

== Kit history ==
- Current sport brand: Adidas
- Home kit: Black shirt with vertical red stripes, black shorts and black socks
- Away kit: White shirt, black shorts and white socks
- 3rd kit: Blue-grey shirt with Bembel pattern, blue shorts and grey socks

Historic	Current

=== Sponsoring ===
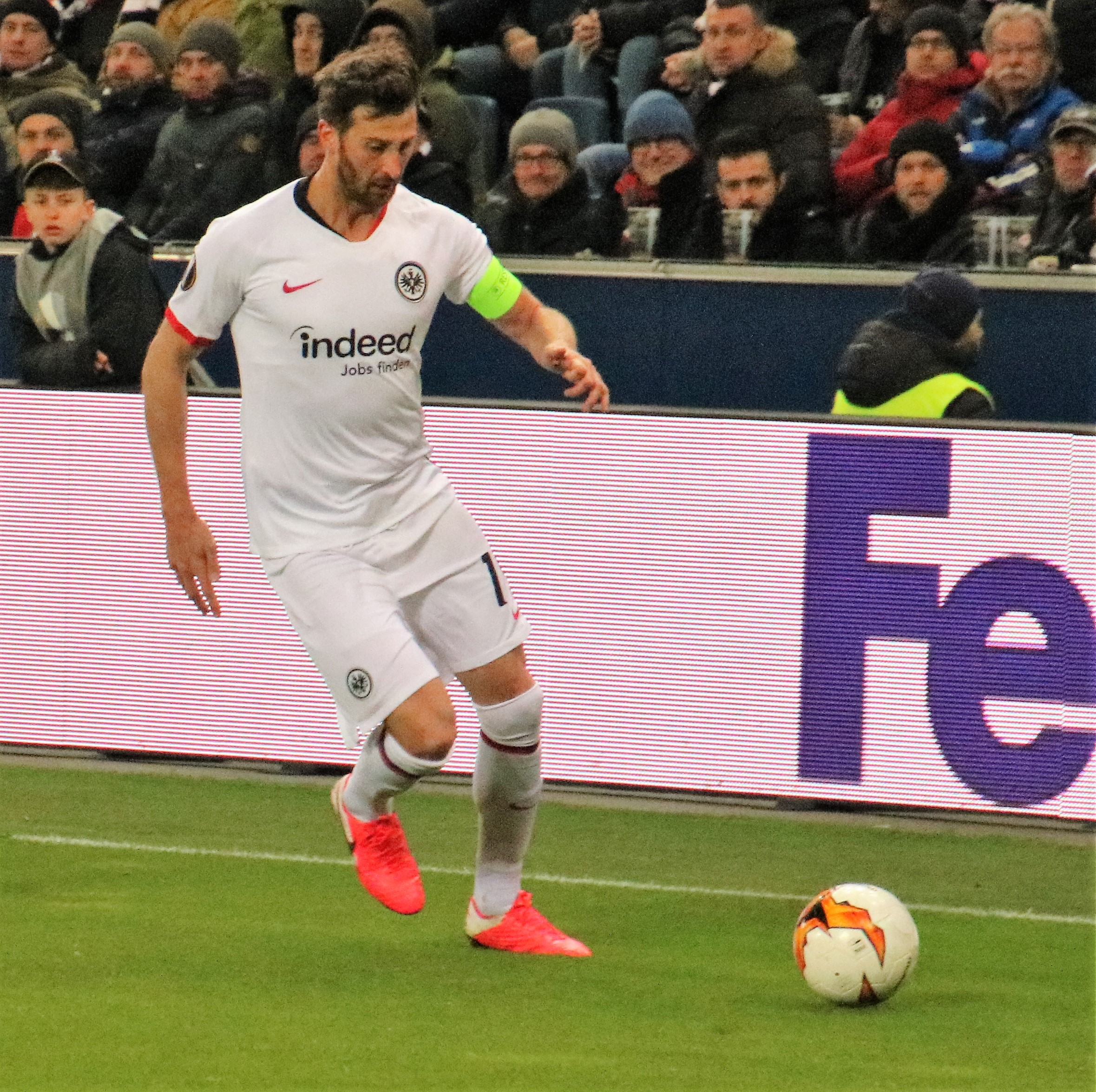
Kit used in 2020 season featuring team captain David Abraham

Season	Kit manufacturer	Shirt sponsor	Sleeve sponsor
1974–75	Adidas	Remington	None
1975–76	Adidas / Admiral	Remington	None
1976–77	Admiral / Adidas	None	None
1977–78	Admiral / Adidas	Samson	None
1978–79	Adidas / Erima	Minolta	None
1979–80	Adidas / Erima	Minolta	None
1980–81	Adidas / Erima	Minolta	None
1981–82	Adidas / Erima	Infotec	None
1982–83	Adidas	Infotec	None
1983–84	Adidas	Infotec	None
1984–85	Adidas	Portas	None
1985–86	Adidas	Portas	None
1986–87	Adidas	Hoechst	None
1987–88	Puma	Hoechst	None
1988–89	Puma	Hoechst	None
1989–90	Puma	Hoechst	None
1990–91	Puma	Hoechst	None
1991–92	Puma	Samsung	None
1992–93	Puma	Samsung	None
1993–94	Puma	Tetra Pak	None
1994–95	Puma	Tetra Pak	None
1995–96	Puma	Tetra Pak	None
1996–97	Puma	Mitsubishi Motors	None
1997–98	Puma	Mitsubishi Motors	None
1998–99	Puma	VIAG Interkom	None
1999–00	Puma	VIAG Interkom	None
2000–01	Puma / Fila	Genion	None
2001–02	Fila	Fraport	None
2002–03	Fila	Fraport	None
2003–04	Jako	Fraport	None
2004–05	Jako	Fraport	None
2005–06	Jako	Fraport	None
2006–07	Jako	Fraport	None
2007–08	Jako	Fraport	None
2008–09	Jako	Fraport	None
2009–10	Jako	Fraport	None
2010–11	Jako	Fraport	None
2011–12	Jako	Fraport	None
2012–13	Jako	Krombacher	None
2013–14	Jako	Alfa Romeo	None
2014–15	Nike	Alfa Romeo	None
2015–16	Nike	Alfa Romeo	None
2016–17	Nike	Krombacher	None
2017–18	Nike	Indeed.com	Deutsche Börse Group
2018–19	Nike	Indeed.com	Deutsche Börse Group
2019–20	Nike	Indeed.com	Deutsche Börse Group
2020–21	Nike	Indeed.com	dpd
2021–22	Nike	Indeed.com	dpd
2022–23	Nike	Indeed.com	dpd / JOKA (in UEFA matches)
2023–24	Nike	Indeed.com	Elotrans reload
2024–25	Nike	Indeed.com	Elotrans reload
2025–26	Adidas	Indeed.com	DVAG
2026–27	Adidas	Indeed.com	DVAG

== Current club staff ==
As of 31 May 2026

Position	Name
Board member for sport	(Germany) Markus Krösche
Sporting director	(Germany) Timmo Hardung
Head coach	(Austria) Adi Hütter
Assistant coach	(Austria) Christian Peintinger (Austria) Klaus Schmidt (Germany) Alex Meier
Goalkeeper coach	(Germany) Jan Zimmermann
Head of conditioning	(Germany) Schahriar Bigdeli
Conditioning coach	(Germany) Andreas Beck (Germany) Thomas Pitzke (Germany) Martin Spohrer
Individual development coach	(Germany) Martin Daxl
Transition coach	(Germany) Ralph Gunesch
Rehab coach	(England) Andrew Mitchell (Germany) Lucas Trittel
Head of medical care and senior physiotherapist & osteopath	(Germany) Christian Haser
Club doctor	(Germany) Dr. Sebastian Schneider (Germany) Dr. Marco Campo-dell'Orto (Germany) Dr. med. Daniel Lay
Physiotherapist and osteopath	(Germany) Patrick Kux (Germany) Niklas Mazeczek
Physiotherapist, osteopath and rehabilitation coach	(Germany) Benjamin Sommer
Physiotherapist	(Germany) Lucas Trittel (Germany) Daniel Kraft
Medical assistant	(Japan) Koichi Kurokawa
Head of sports science	(Germany) Winfried Banzer
Data analysis and medical performance diagnostics	(Germany) Dr. Thomas Blobel
Staff member human performance data analysis medical department	(Germany) Benedikt Vennen
Sports scientist	(Germany) Laura Jablonski
Study coordination & data analysis	(Germany) Dr. Johanna Sieland (Germany) Hendrik Both (Germany) Felix Laukhardt
Nutritionist	(Germany) Anna von der Felden
Head of team management & integration	(Germany) Patrick Zeilmann
Team management & integration assistant	(Spain) Rafael Francisco (Germany) Marcus Czypionka (Germany) Lukas King
Head of equipment management	(Italy) Franco Lionti
Equipment management assistant	(Germany) Kay Schulmeyer (Germany) Till Gardenier (Ukraine) Igor Simonov (Serbia) Ljiljana Svrkota
Translator	(France) Stéphane Gödde
Head of match analysis	(Germany) Marco Schuster
Match analyst	(Germany) Marco Russ (Germany) Max Steiger (Germany) Yannick Herkommer (Germany) Dominik Mews
Goalkeeping match analyst	(Germany) Jonas Gabi
Head of first-team department	(Germany) Christoph Preuß
Aide to board member for sport	(Germany) Ole Siegel
Sporting management assistant	(Germany) Maureen Rodrigues
Contract management & sports administration advisor	(Germany) Florian Bruchhäuser
Head of scouting	(Germany) Sebastian Frank (Germany) Sebastian Stein
Head of scouting & data analysis	(Germany) Bastian Quentmeier
Data analyst	(Germany) Cornelius Kreusser
Head of sports technology & match analysis	(Germany) Steffen Haas
Employee of sports technology & game analysis	(Germany) Sebastian Wöhr
Game analyst	(Germany) Maximilian Steiger
Sports technology & match analysis assistant	(Germany) Philipp Hochgesand
Head of Eintracht football intelligence (EFI)	(Germany) Dr. Tin-Kwai Man
Sports back office assistant	(Germany) Lukas King
Head of nutrition	(Germany) Anna van der Felden
Yoga coach	(Germany) Dr. Frauke Kuhn
Head chef	(Germany) Erik Höfling
Chef	(Germany) Petar Vuko (Germany) Michaela Lügenbiehl
Bus driver	(Germany) Rolf Gewehr

== Club presidents ==
- (Germany) Wilhelm Schöndube (1920–1926)
- (Germany) Fritz Steffan / (Germany) Heinrich Berger (1926–1927)
- (Germany) Horst Rebenschütz (1927)
- (Germany) Egon Graf von Beroldingen (1927–1933)
- (Nazi Germany) Hans Söhngen (1933–1939)
- (Nazi Germany) Rudolf Gramlich / (Nazi Germany) Adolf Metzner (1939–1942)
- (Nazi Germany) Anton Gentil (1942–1945) (temporary)
- (Germany) Christian Kiefer (1945–1946) (temporary)
- (Germany) Günther Reis (1946)
- (Germany) Robert Brubacher (1946–1949)
- (Germany) Anton Keller (1949–1955)
- (Germany) Rudolf Gramlich (1955–1969)
- (Germany) Albert Zellekens (1970–1973)
- (Germany) Achaz von Thümen (1973–1981)
- (Germany) Axel Schander (1981–1983)
- (Germany) Klaus Gramlich (1983–1988)
- (Germany) Joseph Wolf (1988)
- (Germany) Matthias Ohms (1988–1996)
- (Germany) Dieter Lindner (1996) (temporary)
- (Germany) Hans-Joachim Otto (1996)
- (Germany) Rolf Heller (1996–2000)
- (Germany) Peter Fischer (2000–2024)
- (Germany) Mathias Beck (2024–)

== Coaches ==
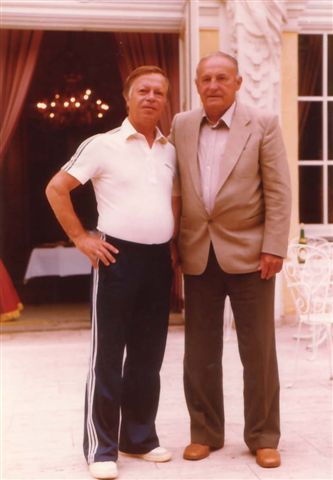
Paul Oßwald (right) led Eintracht Frankfurt to the German championship in 1959 and the European Cup final in 1960.

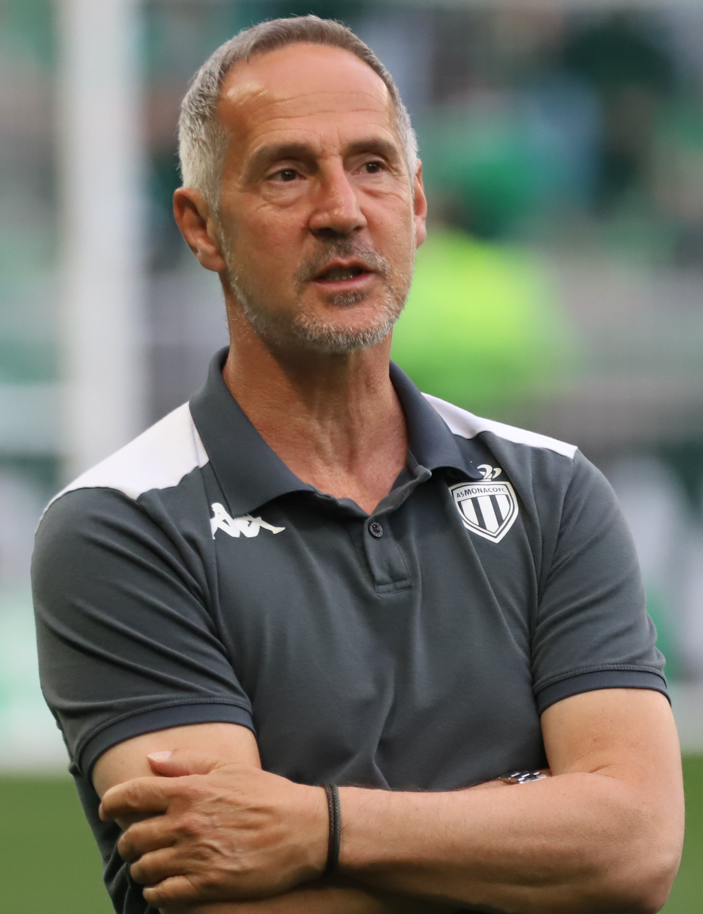
Adi Hütter

- (Germany) Albert Sohn (1919)
- (Kingdom of Hungary) Dori Kürschner (1921–1922)
- (Wales) Maurice Parry (1925–1926)
- (Germany) Fritz Égly / (Switzerland) Walter Dietrich (1926–1927)
- (Austria) Gustav Wieser (October 1927 – May 1928)
- (Germany) Paul Oßwald (1928 – August 1933)
- (Nazi Germany) Willi Spreng (1933–1935)
- (Nazi Germany) Paul Oßwald (1935–1938)
- (Nazi Germany) Otto Boer (1939) (caretaker)
- (Hungary) Péter Szabó (1939)
- (Nazi Germany) Willi Lindner (1941) (caretaker)
- (Hungary) Péter Szabó (1942) (caretaker)
- (Nazi Germany) Willi Balles (1942) (caretaker)
- (Germany) Willy Pfeiffer (1945) (caretaker)
- (Germany) Sepp Herberger (1945) (caretaker)
- (Allied-occupied Germany) Emil Melcher (1946)
- (Allied-occupied Germany) Willi Treml (1947)
- (Allied-occupied Germany) Bernhard Kellerhoff (1948 – December 1948)
- (Allied-occupied Germany) Walter Hollstein (January 1949 – Summer 1950)
- (Germany) Kurt Windmann (Summer 1950 – July 1956)
- (Austria) Adolf Patek (July 1956 – April 1958)
- (Germany) Paul Oßwald (April 1958 – April 1964)
- (Socialist Federal Republic of Yugoslavia) Ivica Horvat (April 1964 – June 1965)
- (Romania) Elek Schwartz (July 1965 – June 1968)
- (Germany) Erich Ribbeck (July 1968 – June 1973)
- (Germany) Dietrich Weise (July 1973 – June 1976)
- (Germany) Hans-Dieter Roos (July 1976 – November 1976)
- (Hungary) Gyula Lóránt (November 1976 – November 1977)
- (Germany) Jürgen Grabowski (December 1977) (caretaker)
- (Germany) Dettmar Cramer (December 1977 – June 1978)
- (Germany) Otto Knefler (July 1978 – December 1978)
- (Germany) Udo Klug (December 1978 – January 1979) (caretaker)
- (Germany) Friedel Rausch (January 1979 – June 1980)
- (Germany) Lothar Buchmann (July 1980 – June 1982)
- (Austria) Helmut Senekowitsch (July 1982 – September 1982)
- (Socialist Federal Republic of Yugoslavia) Branko Zebec (September 1982 – October 1983)
- (Germany) Jürgen Grabowski (October 1983) (caretaker)
- (Germany) Klaus Mank (October 1983) (caretaker)
- (Germany) Dietrich Weise (October 1983 – December 1986)
- (Germany) Timo Zahnleiter (December 1986 – June 1987)
- (Germany) Karl-Heinz Feldkamp (July 1987 – September 1988)
- (Hungary) Pál Csernai (September 1988 – December 1988)
- (Germany) Jörg Berger (December 1988 – April 1991)
- (Federal Republic of Yugoslavia) Dragoslav Stepanović (April 1991 – March 1993)
- (Germany) Horst Heese (March 1993 – June 1993)
- (Germany) Klaus Toppmöller (July 1993 – April 1994)
- (Germany) Charly Körbel (April 1994 – June 1994) (caretaker)
- (Germany) Jupp Heynckes (July 1994 – April 1995)
- (Germany) Charly Körbel (April 1995 – March 1996)
- (Federal Republic of Yugoslavia) Dragoslav Stepanović (April 1996 – December 1996)
- (Germany) Rudi Bommer (December 1996) (caretaker)
- (Germany) Horst Ehrmantraut (December 1996 – December 1998)
- (Germany) Bernhard Lippert (December 1998 – January 1999) (caretaker)
- (Germany) Reinhold Fanz (December 1998 – April 1999)
- (Germany) Jörg Berger (April 1999 – December 1999)
- (Germany) Felix Magath (December 1999 – January 2001)
- (Germany) Rolf Dohmen (January 2001 – April 2001) (caretaker)
- (Germany) Friedel Rausch (April 2001 – May 2001)
- (Switzerland) Martin Andermatt (June 2001 – March 2002)
- (Germany) Armin Kraaz (March 2002 – May 2002) (caretaker)
- (Germany) Willi Reimann (July 2002 – May 2004)
- (Germany) Friedhelm Funkel (July 2004 – June 2009)
- (Germany) Michael Skibbe (July 2009 – March 2011)
- (Germany) Christoph Daum (March 2011 – May 2011)
- (Germany) Armin Veh (July 2011 – July 2014)
- (Germany) Thomas Schaaf (July 2014 – June 2015)
- (Germany) Armin Veh (June 2015 – March 2016)
- (Croatia) Niko Kovač (March 2016 – June 2018)
- (Austria) Adi Hütter (July 2018 – June 2021)
- (Austria) Oliver Glasner (July 2021 – June 2023)
- (Germany) Dino Toppmöller (June 2023 – January 2026)
- (Germany) Dennis Schmitt (January 2026 – January 2026) (caretaker)
- (Spain) Albert Riera (February 2026 – May 2026)
- (Austria) Adi Hütter (July 2026 – present)

== Records ==
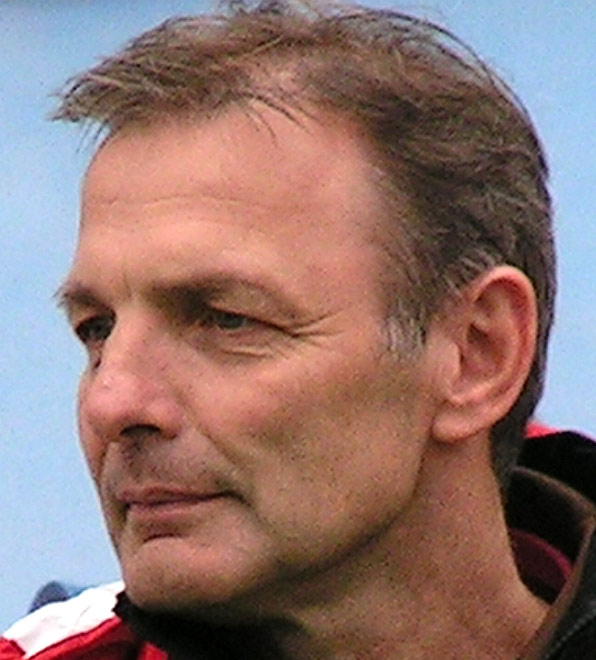
Charly Körbel has the most appearances in Eintracht Frankfurt and Bundesliga history

- Home victory, Bundesliga: 9–1 v Rot-Weiss Essen, 5 October 1974
- Away victory, Bundesliga: 8–1 v Rot-Weiss Essen, 7 May 1977
- Home loss, Bundesliga: 0–7 v Karlsruher SC, 19 September 1964
- Away loss, Bundesliga: 0–7 v 1. FC Köln, 29 October 1983
- Highest home attendance: 81,000 v FK Pirmasens, 23 May 1959
- Highest away attendance: 127,621 v Real Madrid, Hampden Park, Glasgow, 18 May 1960
- Highest average attendance, season: 57,600, 2024–25
- Most appearances, all competitions total: 720, Charly Körbel (1972–1991)
- Most appearances, Bundesliga: 602, Charly Körbel (1972–1991)
- Most goals scored, all competitions total: 225, Karl Ehmer (1927–1938)
- Most goals scored, Bundesliga: 160, Bernd Hölzenbein (1967–1981)
- Most goals scored, season, Bundesliga: 28, André Silva, 2020–21
- Richard Kress, (6 March 1925 – 30 March 1996) is the oldest Bundesliga rookie, making his debut at 38 years and 171 days on the opening day of league play on 24 August 1963. He scored his first Bundesliga goal at 38 years and 248 days of age.

== Stadium ==
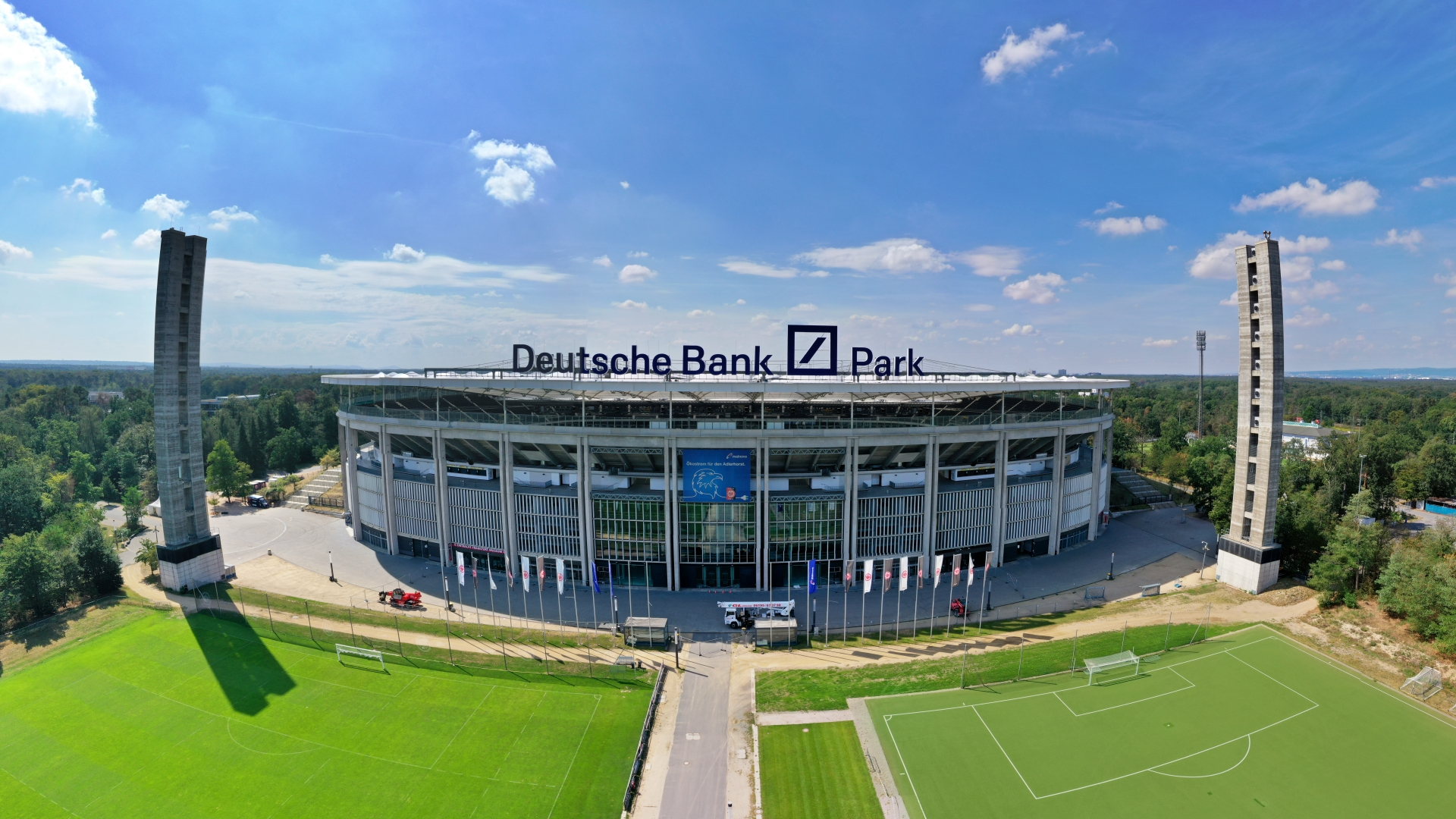
Deutsche Bank Park

The club's initial games from 1899 to 1906 were played on the former Hundswiese field, whose present day location would be near Hessischer Rundfunk. Following new regulations that pitches needed to be surrounded by a fence for the purpose of official games, the team established a new pitch by the Eschersheimer Landstraße called Victoriaplatz in 1906, for which they purchased stands at a price of 350 marks in 1908. From 1912 the team moved to a new ground at Roseggerstraße in Dornbusch with more facilities, before relocating to the former Riederwaldstadion in 1920 following the fusion of Frankfurter FV and Frankfurter Turngemeinde von 1861.

The ground was inaugurated as Waldstadion ("Forest Stadium") in 1925 with the German championship final match between FSV Frankfurt vs. 1. FC Nürnberg. The facility was renovated for the FIFA World Cup 2006 in Germany. As of 2026, for Bundesliga fixtures the maximum capacity is 60,100.

Though the media usually refer to the ground by the official name, Deutsche Bank Park, Eintracht fans faithful typically use the original name, Waldstadion.

== Reserve team ==
Eintracht Frankfurt U21 is the reserve team of Eintracht Frankfurt. The team played as U23 (Under 23) to emphasize the character of the team as a link between the youth academy and professional team. The club board decided to dissolve the team after the 2013–14 season while playing in the regular league system in the fourth tier, the Regionalliga Süd. On 14 February 2022, Eintracht Frankfurt applied to have a reserves team to be re-admitted to the 5th tier Hessenliga for the 2022–23 season. In the first season after being re-admitted, Frankfurt II won the Hessenliga and got promoted to the Regionalliga Südwest, where they play now.

== Rivalries and friendships ==
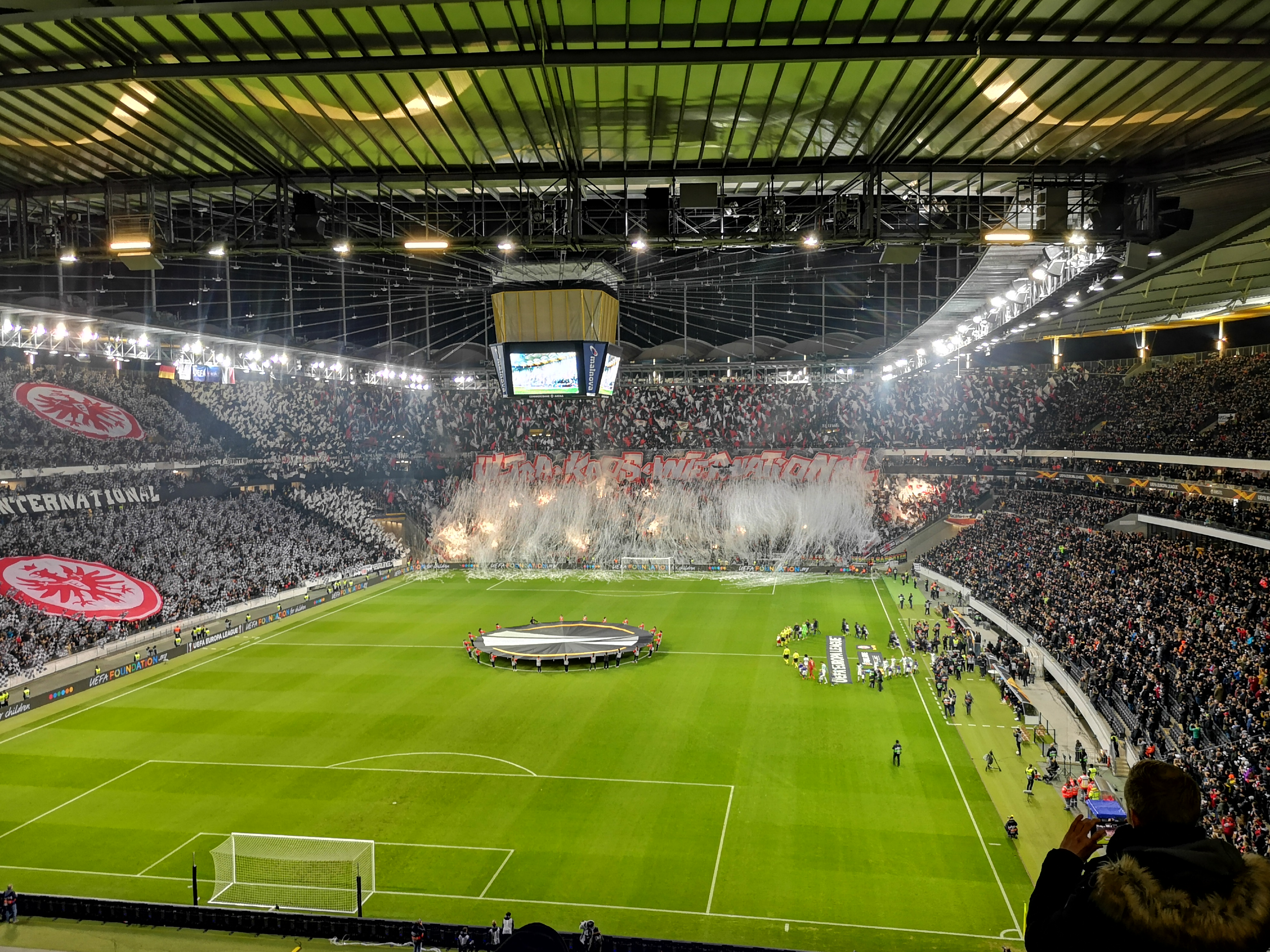
Eintracht Frankfurt supporters performance

The club's main rival is Kickers Offenbach, whose home ground is located a few kilometers upstream along the Main river. The clubs played the 1959 German championship final, which Eintracht won. Due to the Kickers' recent decline, the first squads have not faced each other since 2009. Offenbach and Frankfurt’s reserve team have been competing in the Regionalliga Südwest from 2023-24.

Eintracht also maintain rivalries with Darmstadt 98 regionally, known as the Hesse derby, as well with 1. FSV Mainz 05 and 1. FC Kaiserslautern in Rhineland-Palatinate. German magazine Der Spiegel conducted a survey among their readers in 2018, according to which the Frankfurt-Mainz rivalry is felt more strongly by supporters of the latter, while the animosity between Frankfurt and Kaiserslautern appears rather mutual.

The club's original rival was Frankfurt city-rival FSV Frankfurt. In both clubs' early years, there was a fierce rivalry, but after World War II Eintracht proved to be the stronger and the rivalry deteriorated due to lack of contact. As of 2024, the fan relations tend to be friendly. The 2011–12 season saw Eintracht play FSV in a league match for the first time in almost 50 years. The last league game between the two had been played on 27 January 1962, then in the Oberliga Süd. For the first of the two matches, FSV's home game on 21 August 2011, the decision was made to move to Eintracht's stadium as FSV's Bornheimer Hang held fewer than 11,000 spectators. Eintracht won 4–0. The second match on 18 February 2012 ended in another victory for Eintracht, a 6–1 rout.

Fans maintain or have maintained friendships with several German clubs, such as Chemie Leipzig, MSV Duisburg and Waldhof Mannheim.

A friendship between two Eintracht fan clubs and supporters of English club Oldham Athletic has lasted for over 30 years after fans from each club met at an international football tournament. Eintracht supporters also have an international friendship with supporters of Italian club Atalanta.

== Other sections within the club ==
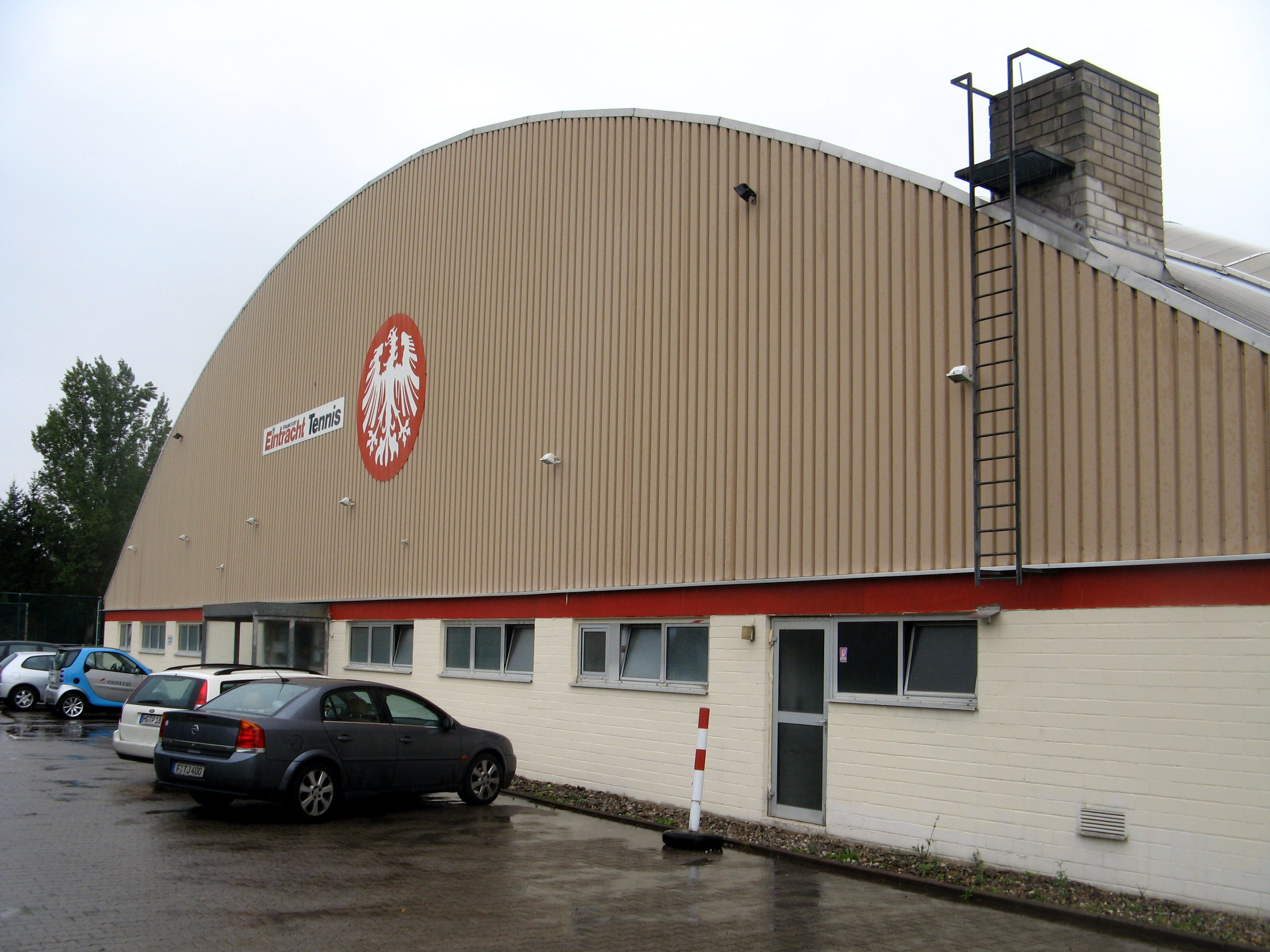
Indoor court of Eintracht's tennis section in Seckbach

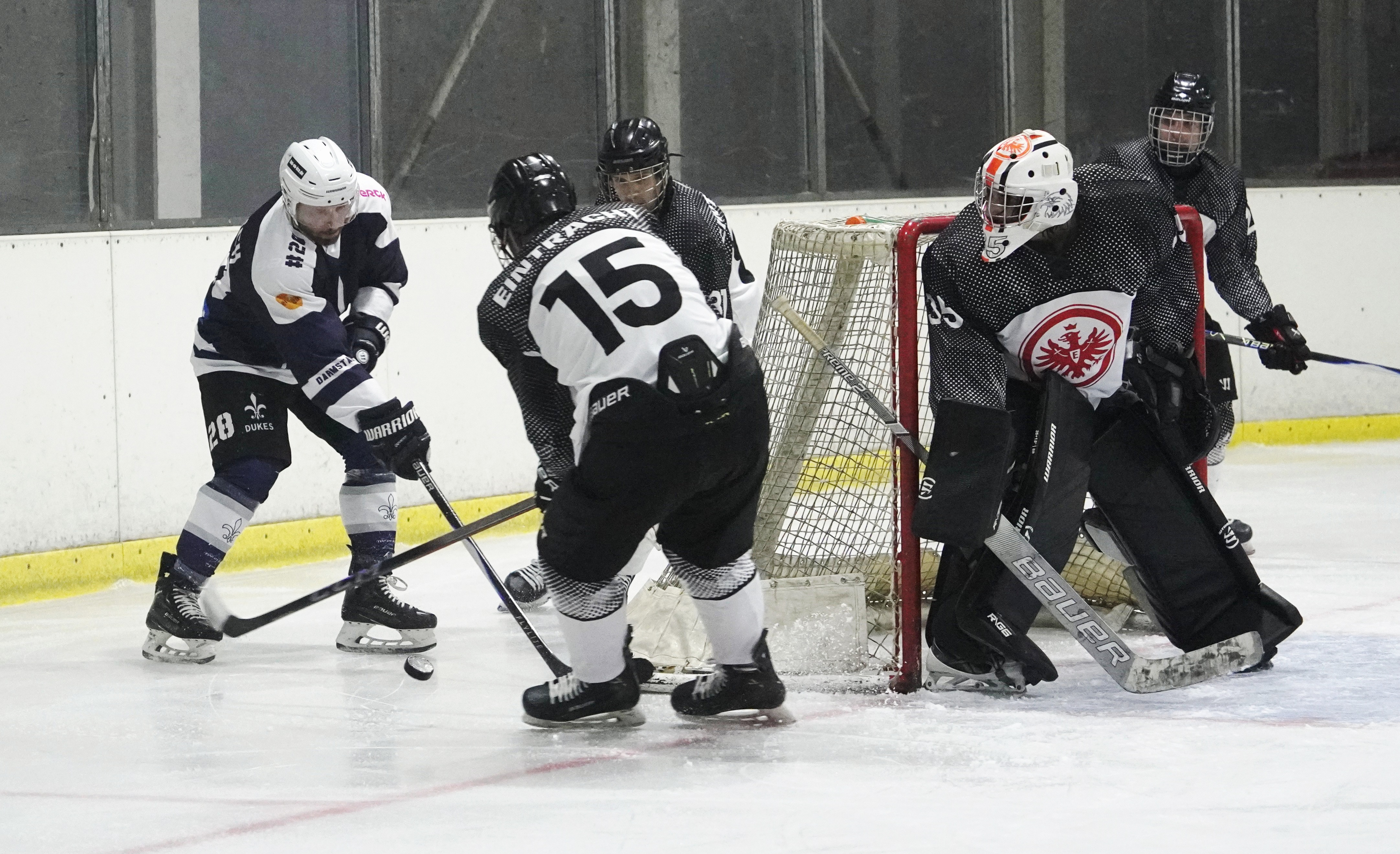
Match Eintracht Frankfurt ice hockey versus Darmstadt Dukes

The sports club Eintracht Frankfurt e.V. is made up of 23 sections:

1. Gymnastics (since 22 January 1861 as "Frankfurter Turngemeinde von 1861)
2. Track and field (since 1899)
3. Football (since 8 March 1899)
4. Field hockey (since 1906 as "1.Frankfurter Hockeyclub)
5. Boxing (since 1919)
6. Tennis (since spring 1920)
7. Handball (since 1921)
8. Rugby (since summer 1923 – see Eintracht Frankfurt Rugby)
9. Table tennis (since November 1924)
10. Basketball (since 4 June 1954 – see Eintracht Frankfurt Basketball)
11. Ice stock sport (since 9 December 1959)
12. Volleyball (since July 1961)
13. Combat sport (since 1976 as "SG Nied)
14. Football supporter's section (since 11 December 2000)
15. Ice hockey (1959 to 1991 and again since 1 July 2002)
16. Darts (since 1 July 2006)
17. Triathlon (since January 2008)
18. Wrestling (since 1 July 2013)
19. Ultimate (since 2015)
20. Table football (since July 2016)
21. Fencing (since 2017)
22. Esports (since June 2019)
23. Golf (since 2023)

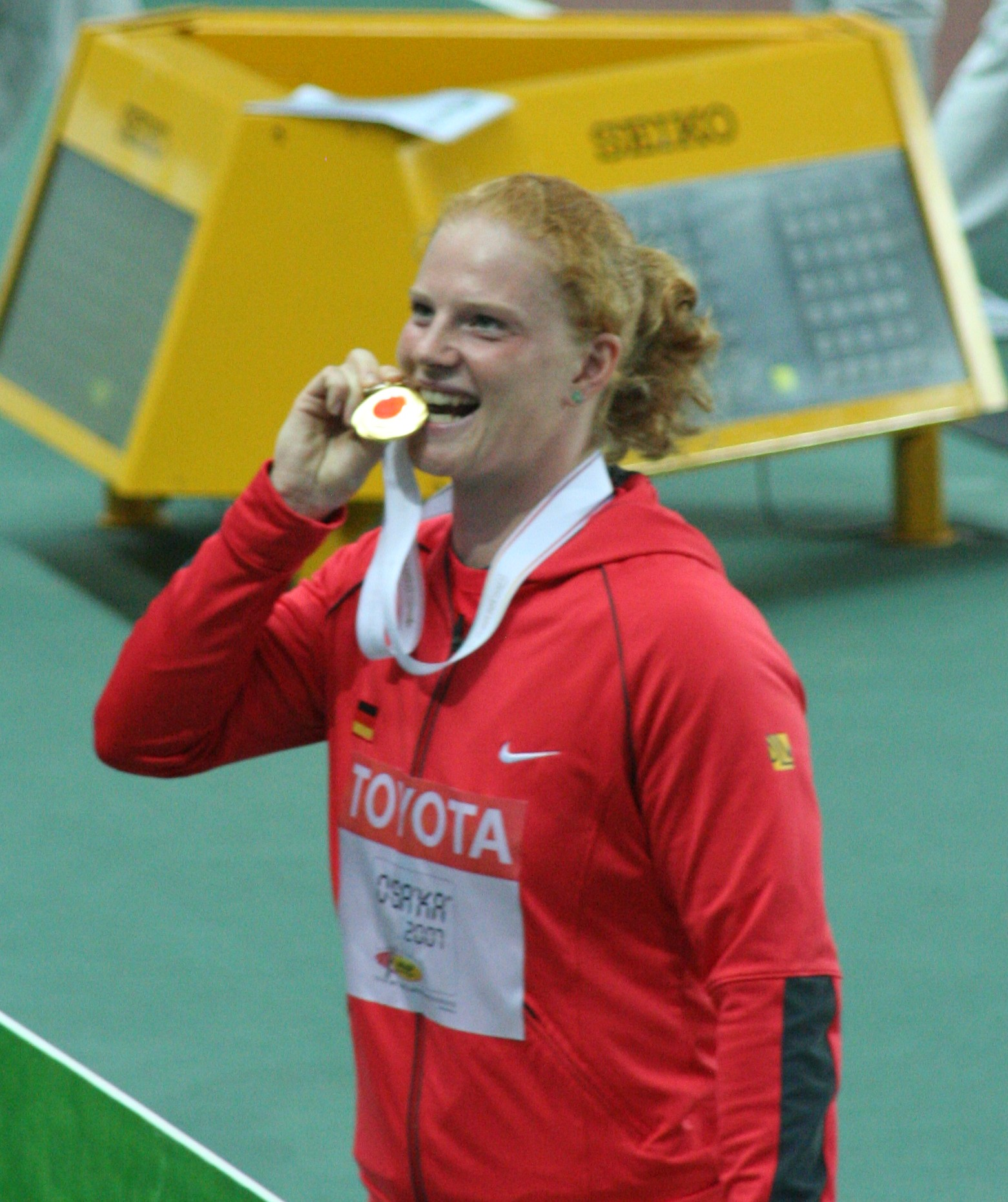
Betty Heidler while being honoured in Osaka.

Betty Heidler, the hammer throw world champion of 2007, was a member of the Eintracht Frankfurt athletics team. Other Eintracht athletes include the 2008 Olympians Andrea Bunjes, Ariane Friedrich, Kamghe Gaba and Kathrin Klaas.

The club's rugby union section twice reached the final of the German rugby union championship, in 1940 and 1965.

Within the football section, the sports club directly manages only the youth system and the reserve team. The professional footballers are managed as a separate limited corporation, Eintracht Frankfurt Fußball-AG, which is a subsidiary of the parent club.

== See also ==
- List of Eintracht Frankfurt players
- List of Eintracht Frankfurt records and statistics
- Eintracht Frankfurt in European football
- Eintracht Frankfurt II
- Eintracht Frankfurt Women
- Eintracht Frankfurt Basketball
- Eintracht Frankfurt Rugby
