= 1984 DFB-Pokal semi-finals =

1983–84 DFB-Pokal

Tournament details
- Country: Germany
- Dates: 1–9 May 1984
- Teams: 4

Tournament statistics
- Matches played: 3
- Goals scored: 26 (8.67 per match)
- Attendance: 145,100 (48,367 per match)
- Top goal scorer(s): Dieter Hoeneß; Karl-Heinz Rummenigge; Olaf Thon (3 goals each)

The semi-finals of the 1983–84 DFB-Pokal were some of the most memorable matches in the history of German football due to the unusual occurrences of the matches and their high-scoring results. Bayern Munich, Werder Bremen, and Borussia Mönchengladbach of the Bundesliga, along with second division side Schalke 04 had all advanced from the quarter-finals. The draw resulted in the following pairings:

- Borussia Mönchengladbach vs Werder Bremen
- Schalke 04 vs Bayern Munich

These were the first two semi-final matches of the DFB-Pokal broadcast live on German television. The matches took place on 1 and 2 May 1984, both of which went to extra time. A replay took place one week later on 9 May. It took a total of 26 goals, none of which were penalties, in three matches to determine the teams which would take part in the 1984 DFB-Pokal Final, making the 1984 semi-finals the highest scoring round in DFB-Pokal history. In 2009, on the 25th anniversary of the matches, German newspaper Die Welt called the semi-finals "the two most spectacular cup ties ever".

== Semi-final 1: Borussia Mönchengladbach vs Werder Bremen ==
Borussia Mönchengladbach vs Werder Bremen
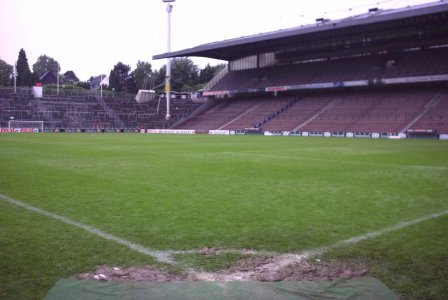
- The Bökelbergstadion in Mönchengladbach hosted the semi-final match
- Event: 1983–84 DFB-Pokal; Semi-final 1
Borussia Mönchengladbach	Werder Bremen
5	4
- After extra time
- Date: 1 May 1984
- Venue: Bökelbergstadion, Mönchengladbach
- Referee: Franz-Josef Hontheim (Trier)
- Attendance: 34,500

In the first semi-final match, contested at the Bökelbergstadion in Mönchengladbach on 1 May 1984 was between fourth in the 1983–84 Bundesliga table, Borussia Mönchengladbach, and fifth in the table at the time, Werder Bremen. The match started out as an even game, but as the match progressed, Mönchengladbach began to take control before the crowd of 34,500 spectators. Five minutes before half-time Mönchengladbach went ahead by a goal from Lothar Matthäus, but just two minutes later Norbert Meier equalized for Bremen. Another two minutes later Norbert Ringels restored Mönchengladbach to 2–1 at half-time. In the 76th minute, lead was further extended to 3–1 via Uwe Rahn. Within six minutes, Werder turned the tie around and lead 4–3 going into stoppage time after goals from Benno Möhlmann in the 77th minute, Wolfgang Sidka in the 80th minute and Uwe Reinders in the 82nd minute. After the Bremen's third goal, Gladbach coach Jupp Heynckes substituted striker Hans-Jörg Criens into the match, which would prove to be vital. In the 88th minute, Wilfried Hannes put the ball into the back of the net, but the referee Franz-Josef Hontheim did not award the goal after it was called offside by the linesman. Bremen could not hold on however, and in the fifth minute of stoppage time substitute Hans-Jörg Criens proved decisive by netting the equalizer for Borussia, and sending the match into extra time. In extra time, both teams had numerous opportunities to score. In the end, Criens once again proved himself decisive by scoring what would be the game-winning goal for Mönchengladbach in the 107th minute, sending them to the final.

=== Special occurrences ===
Midway through the second half, there was unrest within Bremen's fan blocks, which was located behind the goal of Gladbach keeper Ulrich Sude. During the game, an object was thrown onto the pitch, which released smoke. Initially the object was thought to be a smoke bomb, but after Wolfgang Sidka, Uwe Rahn and goalkeeper Sude were contaminated by the smoke, the game had to be stopped for a few minutes. On the pitch there were scuffles between players and coaches of both teams, triggered by Michael Frontzeck bumping into Bremen coach Otto Rehhagel, who had rushed onto the field, worried about Sidka. Referee Hontheim had to calm the situation. Meanwhile, the smoke was determined to be tear gas, which even began to affect the spectators. The police marched into Bremen's block and arrested several people. After the final whistle, Bremen's sporting director Wilfried Lemke protested against the validity of the match, but he withdrew, as both teams were affected by the incident.

=== Miscellaneous ===
The match was considered the debut of "super-sub" Hans-Jörg Criens, who had played a part in several crucial and important goals. The match was broadcast live on Das Erste by ARD, commentated by Heribert Faßbender.

=== Match details ===
1 May 1984
18:00 CEST

Borussia Mönchengladbach	5–4 (a.e.t.)	Werder Bremen
Matthäus 40'; Ringels 44'; Rahn 76'; Criens 90+5', 107'	Report	Meier 42'; Möhlmann 77'; Sidka 80'; Reinders 82'

Bökelbergstadion, Mönchengladbach
Attendance: 34,500
Referee: Franz-Josef Hontheim (Trier)

Borussia Mönchengladbach	Werder Bremen

GK	1	(West Germany) Ulrich Sude
CB	2	(West Germany) Norbert Ringels	Yellow card
CB	7	(West Germany) Hans-Günter Bruns
CB	4	(West Germany) Wilfried Hannes (c)
RWB	5	(Norway) Kai Erik Herlovsen
LWB	3	(West Germany) Michael Frontzeck
CM	6	(West Germany) Lothar Matthäus
CM	8	(West Germany) Uwe Rahn
CM	9	(West Germany) Winfried Schäfer		(substituted off) 82'
CF	11	(West Germany) Ewald Lienen		(substituted off) 82'
CF	10	(West Germany) Frank Mill
Substitutes:
DF	13	(West Germany) Uli Borowka		(substituted on) 82'
FW	14	(West Germany) Hans-Jörg Criens		(substituted on) 82'
Manager:
(West Germany) Jupp Heynckes

GK	1	(West Germany) Dieter Burdenski
RB	2	(West Germany) Thomas Schaaf
CB	5	(West Germany) Klaus Fichtel
CB	8	(West Germany) Norbert Siegmann	Yellow card
LB	3	(West Germany) Jonny Otten
RM	4	(West Germany) Rigobert Gruber		(substituted off) 17'
CM	7	(West Germany) Wolfgang Sidka
CM	6	(West Germany) Benno Möhlmann (c)
LM	11	(West Germany) Norbert Meier
CF	10	(West Germany) Uwe Reinders
CF	9	(West Germany) Frank Neubarth
Substitutes:
MF	12	(West Germany) Karl-Heinz Kamp		(substituted on) 17' (substituted off) 77'
FW	13	(West Germany) Frank Ordenewitz		(substituted on) 77'
Manager:
(West Germany) Otto Rehhagel

Match rules

- 90 minutes.
- 30 minutes of extra time if necessary.
- Replay if scores still level.
- Maximum of two substitutions.

== Semi-final 2: Schalke 04 vs Bayern Munich ==
Schalke 04 vs Bayern Munich
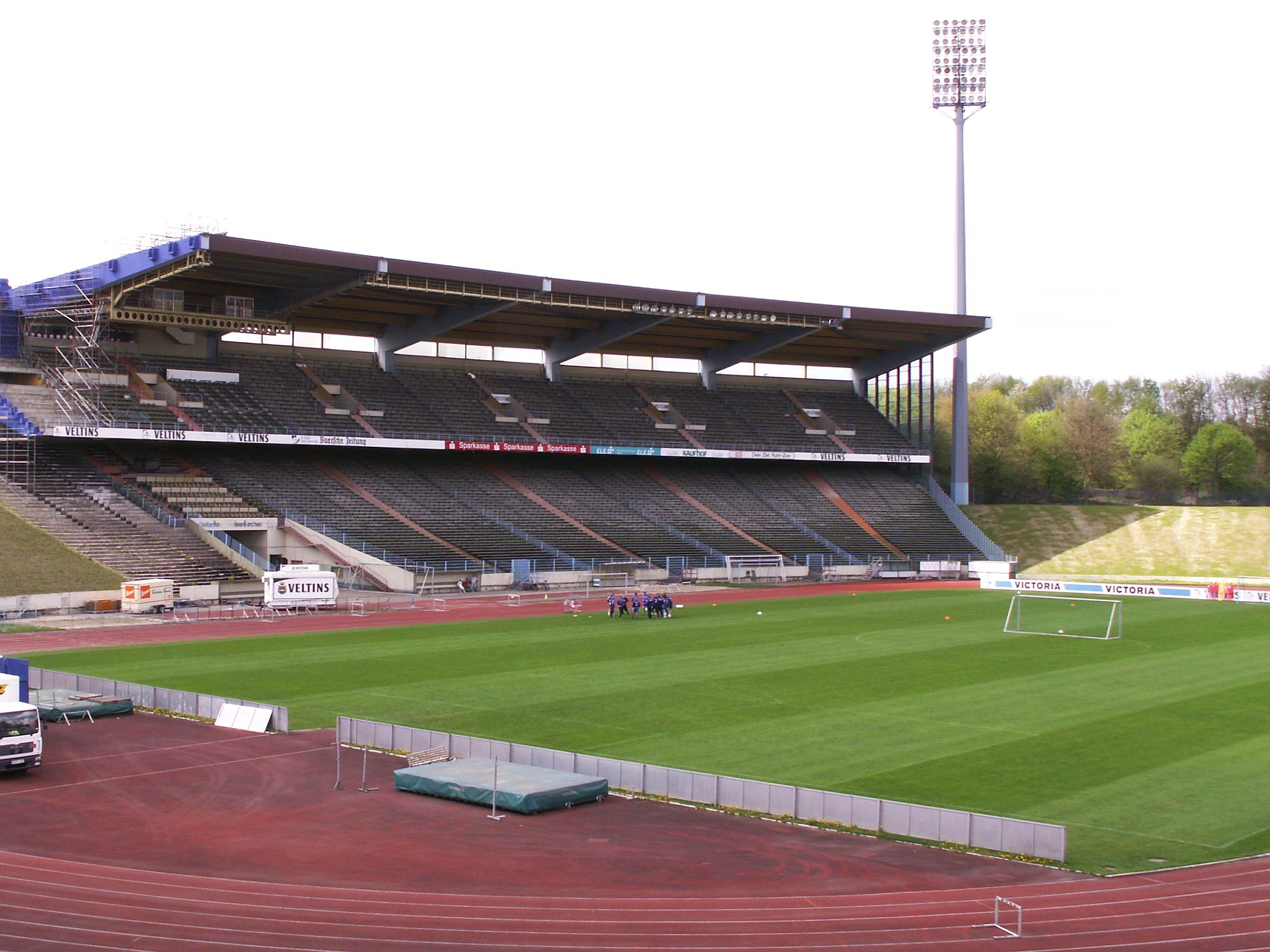
- The Parkstadion in Gelsenkirchen hosted the original semi-final match
- Event: 1983–84 DFB-Pokal; Semi-final 2
Schalke 04	Bayern Munich
- Bayern Munich won after a replay

Original match
Schalke 04	Bayern Munich
6	6
- After extra time
- Date: 2 May 1984
- Venue: Parkstadion, Gelsenkirchen
- Referee: Wolf-Günter Wiesel (Ottbergen)
- Attendance: 70,600

Replay
Bayern Munich	Schalke 04
3	2
- Date: 9 May 1984
- Venue: Olympiastadion, Munich
- Referee: Hans-Joachim Osmers (Bremen)
- Attendance: 40,000

On 2 May 1984, the second semi-final took place at the Parkstadion in Gelsenkirchen between the "underdogs" and 1983–84 2. Bundesliga runner-up, Schalke 04, and Bayern Munich, second in the Bundesliga at the time. The match would be called "the most dramatic cup game played in the history of the Pokal since the 1935 competition". The sold-out Parkstadion had an official attendance of 70,600 spectators, although unofficially there were said to be up to 78,000. Bayern quickly led 2–0 after Karl-Heinz Rummenigge opened the scoring in the 3rd minute, and Reinhold Mathy with the second in the 12th. However, Schalke quickly struck back as Thomas Kruse scored a minute later, before Olaf Thon equalised in the 19th minute. One minute later Bayern regained the lead via a goal from Michael Rummenigge. In the second half, Thon once again equalised, with the goal coming in the 61st minute. Then, for the first time in the match, Schalke took the lead after a goal from Peter Stichler in the 72nd minute. Bayern equalised after Michael Rummenigge scored his second, sending the match into extra time after finishing 4–4. After 112 minutes, Schalke keeper Walter Junghans made a mistake, allowing Dieter Hoeneß to score and regain the lead for Bayern. Once again Schalke levelled the tie in the 115th minute via a goal from Bernard Dietz. Three minutes later Bayern once again gained the lead after Dieter Hoeneß scored his second goal in extra time. With the last attack in stoppage time in extra time, Olaf Thon equalized for Schalke, scoring his third of the match, thereby completing a hat-trick and forcing a replay in Munich after a 6–6 draw.

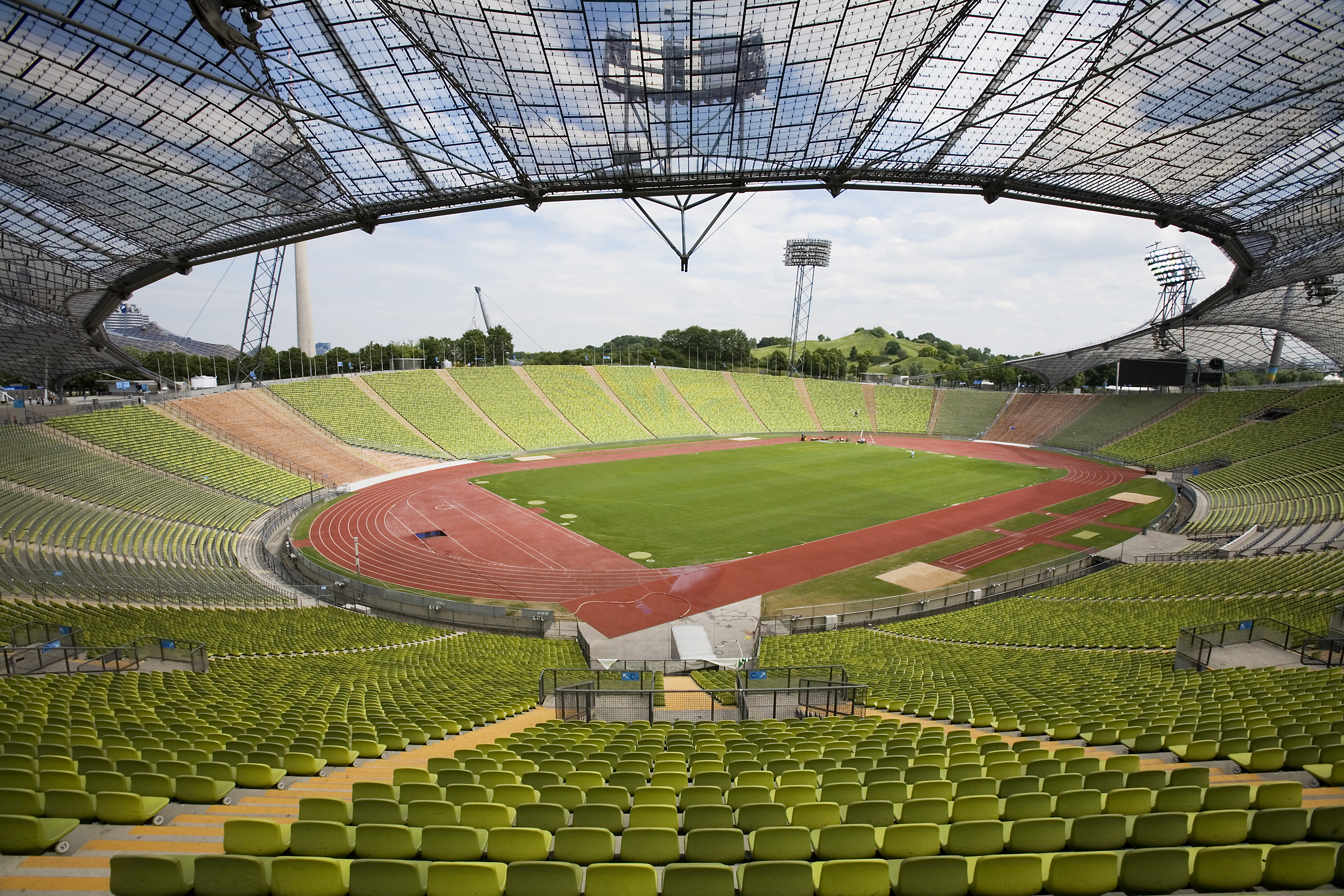
The Olympiastadion in Munich hosted the replay match

The replay took place a week later, on 9 May 1984 at the Olympiastadion München in front of 40,000 spectators. Karl-Heinz Rummenigge and Dieter Hoeneß put Bayern 2–0 at half-time, but once again Schalke came back after goals from Michael Jacob in the 50th minute and Michael Opitz in the 72nd. Seven minutes later, Karl-Heinz Rummenigge scored what turned out to be the winning goal, giving Bayern a 3–2 win and sending them to the final, where they would meet Gladbach.

=== Olaf Thon ===
Olaf Thon, a Schalke player who turned 18 the day before the first match, scored three goals in the first match, completing a hat-trick. Bayern coach Udo Lattek remarked after the game that he would pay 10 million Deutsche Mark for Thon. Barely six months later, Olaf Thon was called up in the Germany national football team, where he earned his debut cap against Malta.

=== Reporting ===
The first match was broadcast live on ZDF, commentated by Eberhard Figgemeier. It began at 20:15, after Bayern had already scored twice. The reporter praised the match, even 20 years later, saying that it was "an unbelievable game. You cannot imagine football more beautiful than this". The radio broadcast was commentated by Manfred Breuckmann.

=== Original match details ===
2 May 1984
20:00 CEST

Schalke 04	6–6 (a.e.t.)	Bayern Munich
Kruse 13'; Thon 19', 61', 120+3'; Stichler 72'; Dietz 115'	Report	K.H. Rummenigge 3'; Mathy 12'; M. Rummenigge 20', 80'; Hoeneß 112', 118'

Parkstadion, Gelsenkirchen
Attendance: 70,600
Referee: Wolf-Günter Wiesel (Ottbergen)

Schalke 04	Bayern Munich

GK	1	(West Germany) Walter Junghans
RB	2	(West Germany) Thomas Kruse
CB	5	(West Germany) Bernard Dietz
CB	4	(West Germany) Matthias Schipper
LB	3	(West Germany) Michael Jakobs
CM	6	(West Germany) Michael Opitz		(substituted off) 106'
CM	7	(West Germany) Bernd Dierßen
CM	8	(West Germany) Peter Stichler	Yellow card
RW	9	(West Germany) Volker Abramczik		(substituted off) 73'
CF	10	(West Germany) Olaf Thon
LW	11	(West Germany) Klaus Täuber	Yellow card
Substitutes:
MF	13	(West Germany) Hubert Clute-Simon		(substituted on) 73'
MF	14	(West Germany) Klaus Berge		(substituted on) 106'
Manager:
(West Germany) Diethelm Ferner

GK	1	(Belgium) Jean-Marie Pfaff
RB	2	(East Germany) Norbert Nachtweih
CB	5	(West Germany) Klaus Augenthaler
CB	4	(West Germany) Bertram Beierlorzer
LB	3	(West Germany) Bernd Dürnberger		(substituted off) 77'
RM	10	(West Germany) Michael Rummenigge
CM	8	(West Germany) Wolfgang Grobe		(substituted off) 109'
CM	6	(Denmark) Søren Lerby	Yellow card
LM	7	(West Germany) Hans Pflügler
CF	9	(West Germany) Reinhold Mathy	Yellow card
CF	11	(West Germany) Karl-Heinz Rummenigge (c)
Substitutes:
MF	13	(West Germany) Wolfgang Kraus		(substituted on) 109'
FW	14	(West Germany) Dieter Hoeneß		(substituted on) 77'
Manager:
(West Germany) Udo Lattek

Match rules

- 90 minutes.
- 30 minutes of extra time if necessary.
- Replay if scores still level.
- Maximum of two substitutions.

=== Replay details ===
9 May 1984
20:00 CEST

Bayern Munich	3–2	Schalke 04
K.H. Rummenigge 32', 79'; Hoeneß 44'	Report	Jakobs 50'; Opitz 72'

Olympiastadion, Munich
Attendance: 40,000
Referee: Hans-Joachim Osmers (Bremen)

Bayern Munich	Schalke 04

GK	1	(Belgium) Jean-Marie Pfaff
RB		(West Germany) Bernd Martin
CB		(West Germany) Klaus Augenthaler
CB		(West Germany) Bertram Beierlorzer
LB		(West Germany) Bernd Dürnberger
CM		(East Germany) Norbert Nachtweih
CM		(West Germany) Wolfgang Grobe
CM		(Denmark) Søren Lerby
RW		(West Germany) Michael Rummenigge	(substituted off) 48'
CF		(West Germany) Dieter Hoeneß
LW		(West Germany) Karl-Heinz Rummenigge (c)
Substitutes:
MF		(West Germany) Karl Del'Haye	(substituted on) 48'
Manager:
(West Germany) Udo Lattek

GK	1	(West Germany) Walter Junghans
RB		(West Germany) Thomas Kruse
CB		(West Germany) Bernard Dietz
CB		(West Germany) Mathias Schipper
LB		(West Germany) Michael Jakobs
RM		(West Germany) Michael Opitz
CM		(West Germany) Bernd Dierßen	Yellow card
CM		(West Germany) Peter Stichler
LM		(West Germany) Klaus Berge
CF		(West Germany) Olaf Thon
CF		(West Germany) Klaus Täuber
Manager:
(West Germany) Diethelm Ferner

Match rules

- 90 minutes.
- 30 minutes of extra time if necessary.
- Penalty shoot-out if scores still level.
- Maximum of two substitutions.
