= 1984 DFB-Pokal final =

- Match programme cover
- Event: 1983–84 DFB-Pokal
Bayern Munich	Borussia Mönchengladbach
1	1
- After extra time Bayern Munich won 7–6 on penalties
- Date: 31 May 1984
- Venue: Waldstadion, Frankfurt
- Referee: Volker Roth (Salzgitter)
- Attendance: 61,146

The 1984 DFB-Pokal final decided the winner of the 1983–84 DFB-Pokal, the 41st season of Germany's premier knockout football cup competition. It was played on 31 May 1984 at the Waldstadion in Frankfurt, the most recent DFB-Pokal final not to be played at the Olympiastadion in West Berlin (now Berlin). Bayern Munich won the match 7–6 on penalties against Borussia Mönchengladbach, following a 1–1 draw after extra time, to claim their seventh cup title.

This was the first time a cup final went to penalties, and the longest final penalty shoot-out to date, with the teams having taken eight each. The match was also Lothar Matthäus's final match for Gladbach before his summer move to Bayern. Controversy raged after Matthäus missed his penalty over the crossbar against his future employer in the shoot-out, with Borussia fans questioning his loyalty after the match.

With the win, Bayern qualified for the 1984–85 European Cup Winners' Cup, where they went on to reach the semi-finals, being knocked out by eventual winners Everton.

== Route to the final ==
The DFB-Pokal began with 64 teams in a single-elimination knockout cup competition. There were a total of five rounds leading up to the final. Teams were drawn against each other, and the winner after 90 minutes would advance. If still tied, 30 minutes of extra time was played. If the score was still level, a replay would take place at the original away team's stadium. If still level after 90 minutes, 30 minutes of extra time was played. If the score was still level, a drawing of lots would decide who would advance to the next round.

Note: In all results below, the score of the finalist is given first (H: home; A: away).

Bayern Munich		Round	Borussia Mönchengladbach
Opponent	Result	1983–84 DFB-Pokal	Opponent	Result
Hessen Kassel (A)	3–0	Round 1	Fortuna Köln (A)	3–2
FC Augsburg (A)	6–0	Round 2	Arminia Bielefeld (H)	3–0
Bayer Uerdingen (A) (H)	0–0 (a.e.t.); 1–0 (replay)	Round of 16	SpVgg Fürth (A)	6–0
1. FC Bocholt (A)	2–1	Quarter-finals	Hannover 96 (A)	1–0
Schalke 04 (A) (H)	6–6 (a.e.t.); 3–2 (replay)	Semi-finals	Werder Bremen (H)	5–4 (a.e.t.)

== Match ==
=== Details ===
31 May 1984
18:00 CEST

Bayern Munich	1–1 (a.e.t.)	Borussia Mönchengladbach
Dremmler 82'	Report	Mill 33'
Penalties
Lerby (penalty scored); Nachtweih (penalty scored); Grobe (penalty scored); Augenthaler (penalty missed); K.H. Rummenigge (penalty scored); Dremmler (penalty scored); Martin (penalty scored); M. Rummenigge (penalty scored)	7–6	(penalty missed) Matthäus; (penalty scored) Herlovsen; (penalty scored) Borowka; (penalty scored) Bruns; (penalty scored) Hannes; (penalty scored) Criens; (penalty scored) Frontzeck; (penalty missed) Ringels

Waldstadion, Frankfurt
Attendance: 61,146
Referee: Volker Roth (Salzgitter)

Bayern Munich	Borussia Mönchengladbach

GK	1	(Belgium) Jean-Marie Pfaff
SW	5	(West Germany) Klaus Augenthaler
CB	2	(West Germany) Bernd Martin
CB	4	(West Germany) Wolfgang Grobe	Booked
RWB	10	(West Germany) Wolfgang Dremmler
LWB	3	(West Germany) Bernd Dürnberger		(substituted off) 58'
CM	8	(West Germany) Wolfgang Kraus	Booked	(substituted off) 46'
CM	6	(Denmark) Søren Lerby	Booked
CM	7	(East Germany) Norbert Nachtweih
CF	9	(West Germany) Michael Rummenigge
CF	11	(West Germany) Karl-Heinz Rummenigge (c)	Booked
Substitutes:
GK	1	(West Germany) Raimond Aumann
FW	14	(West Germany) Dieter Hoeneß		(substituted on) 58'
FW	15	(West Germany) Reinhold Mathy		(substituted on) 46'
Manager:
(West Germany) Udo Lattek

GK	1	(West Germany) Ulrich Sude
SW	7	(West Germany) Hans-Günter Bruns
CB	2	(West Germany) Uli Borowka
CB	4	(West Germany) Wilfried Hannes (c)
RWB	5	(Norway) Kai Erik Herlovsen
LWB	3	(West Germany) Michael Frontzeck
CM	6	(West Germany) Lothar Matthäus
CM	9	(West Germany) Winfried Schäfer	(substituted off) 72'
AM	8	(West Germany) Uwe Rahn	(substituted off) 68'
CF	10	(West Germany) Frank Mill
CF	11	(West Germany) Ewald Lienen
Substitutes:
DF	12	(West Germany) Norbert Ringels	(substituted on) 72'
FW	14	(West Germany) Hans-Jörg Criens	(substituted on) 68'
Manager:
(West Germany) Jupp Heynckes

Match rules

- 90 minutes.
- 30 minutes of extra time if necessary.
- Penalty shoot-out if scores still level.
- Maximum of two substitutions.
