= 1983 German Supercup =

Deutscher Supercup
- Event: German Supercup
Bayern Munich	Hamburger SV
1	1
- Bayern Munich won 4–2 on penalties
- Date: 2 April 1983
- Venue: Olympiastadion, Munich
- Referee: Robert Walz (Waiblingen)
- Attendance: 15,000

The 1983 German Supercup was an unofficial edition of the German Supercup, a football match contested by the winners of the previous season's Bundesliga and DFB-Pokal competitions.

The match was played at the Olympiastadion in Munich, and contested by cup winners Bayern Munich and league champions Hamburger SV. Bayern won the match 4–2 on penalties, following a 1–1 draw (with no extra time played), to claim the unofficial title.

== Teams ==
Team	Qualification
Bayern Munich	1981–82 DFB-Pokal winners
Hamburger SV	1981–82 Bundesliga champions

== Match ==
=== Details ===
2 April 1983

Bayern Munich	1–1	Hamburger SV
K.H. Rummenigge 40'	Report	Đorđević 63'
Penalties
Grobe (penalty scored); Hoeneß (penalty scored); Martin (penalty scored); M. Rummenigge (penalty missed); Dremmler (penalty scored)	4–2	(penalty missed) Kaltz; (penalty scored) Bastrup; (penalty missed) Hartwig; (penalty scored) Hansen

Olympiastadion, Munich
Attendance: 15,000
Referee: Robert Walz (Waiblingen)

Bayern Munich	Hamburger SV

GK	1	(West Germany) Manfred Müller
RB		(West Germany) Bertram Beierlorzer
CB		(West Germany) Bernd Martin
CB		(West Germany) Wolfgang Grobe
LB		(West Germany) Udo Horsmann
CM		(West Germany) Wolfgang Kraus	(substituted off) 46'
CM		(West Germany) Hans Pflügler
CM		(West Germany) Wolfgang Dremmler
RW		(West Germany) Karl Del'Haye
CF		(West Germany) Dieter Hoeneß
LW		(West Germany) Karl-Heinz Rummenigge	(substituted off) 72'
Substitutes:
MF		(East Germany) Norbert Nachtweih	(substituted on) 46'
FW		(West Germany) Michael Rummenigge	(substituted on) 72'
Manager:
(Hungary) Pál Csernai

GK	1	(West Germany) Uli Stein
RB		(West Germany) Michael Schröder
CB		(West Germany) Jürgen Groh
CB		(West Germany) Ditmar Jakobs
LB		(West Germany) Bernd Wehmeyer
RM		(West Germany) Manfred Kaltz
CM		(West Germany) Jimmy Hartwig
CM		(West Germany) Felix Magath
LM		(Denmark) Allan Hansen
CF		(Socialist Federal Republic of Yugoslavia) Boriša Đorđević
CF		(Denmark) Lars Bastrup
Manager:
(Austria) Ernst Happel

== See also ==
- 1982–83 Bundesliga
- 1982–83 DFB-Pokal
