= 1980–81 FC Bayern Munich season =

81st season in existence of Bayern Munich

Bayern Munich
1980–81 season
- Manager: Pál Csernai
- Stadium: Olympiastadion
- Bundesliga: 1st
- DFB-Pokal: Third round
- European Cup: Semi-finals
- Top goalscorer: League: Karl-Heinz Rummenigge (29); All: Karl-Heinz Rummenigge (39)
- Highest home attendance: 78,000 (vs. Hamburger SV)
- Lowest home attendance: 5,000 (vs. Waldhof Mannheim)
Home colours	Away colours

The 1980–81 season of Bayern Munich started with a 3–0 win against Karlsruher SC and finished up as German champions while being eliminated in the third round of the DFB-Pokal and semi-finals of the European Cup.

== Review and events ==
Bayern Munich won the German championship after finishing the season with 22 wins, 9 draws and 3 losses from 34 matches.

== Results ==
=== Legend ===
Win Draw Loss

=== Bundesliga ===
16-08-1980 Matchday 1	Karlsruher SC	0–3	Bayern Munich	Karlsruhe
15:30 CET		Match Report	Rummenigge 41'; Breitner 77', 80'	Stadium: Wildparkstadion; Attendance: 47,000; Referee: Dieter Stäglich

19-08-1980 Matchday 2	Bayern Munich	5–3	Borussia Dortmund	Munich
20:00 CET	Breitner 42' (pen.); Horsmann 70'; Augenthaler 72'; Rummenigge 81', 85'	Match Report	50', 76' Burgsmüller; 72' Votava	Stadium: Olympic Stadium; Attendance: 50,000; Referee: Walter Engel

23-08-1980 Matchday 3	Fortuna Düsseldorf	3–0	Bayern Munich	Düsseldorf
15:30 CET	Bommer 62'; K. Allofs 84'; T. Allofs 87'	Match Report		Stadium: Rheinstadion; Attendance: 55,000; Referee: Wilfried Heitmann

03-09-1980 Matchday 4	Bayern Munich	5–1	Schalke 04	Munich
20:00 CET	Rummenigge 36', 52'; Hoeneß 54', 61'; Augenthaler 57'	Match Report	43' Kügler	Stadium: Olympic Stadium; Attendance: 28,000; Referee: Franz-Josef Hontheim

06-09-1980 Matchday 5	Arminia Bielefeld	1–2	Bayern Munich	Bielefeld
15:30 CET	Sackewitz 21'	Match Report	9' Dremmler; 77' Hoeneß	Stadium: Bielefelder Alm; Attendance: 34,500; Referee: Walter Horstmann

13-09-1980 Matchday 6	Bayern Munich	3–0	Bayer Leverkusen	Munich
CET	Hoeneß 45', 76'; Breitner 58'	Match Report		Stadium: Olympic Stadium; Attendance: 23,000; Referee: Peter Gabor

20-09-1980 Matchday 7	VfB Stuttgart	1–2	Bayern Munich	Stuttgart
15:30 CET	Klotz 88'	Match Report	32' Dürnberger; 73' Kraus	Stadium: Neckarstadion; Attendance: 71,500; Referee: Gerd Hennig

27-09-1980 Matchday 8	Bayern Munich	2–1	Hamburger SV	Munich
15:30 CET	Rummenigge 62'; Augenthaler 86'	Match Report	67' Dreßel	Stadium: Olympic Stadium; Attendance: 78,000; Referee: Walter Eschweiler

14-10-1980 Matchday 9	1860 Munich	1–3	Bayern Munich	Munich
20:00 CET	Viorel Nastase 62'	Match Report	18' Niedermayer; 19' (pen.) Breitner; 70' Rummenigge	Attendance: 53,000; Referee: Karl-Josef Assenmacher

18-10-1980 Matchday 10	Bayern Munich	3–1	VfL Bochum	Munich
15:30 CET	Rummenigge 3', 22'; Dürnberger 29'	Match Report	84' Knüwe	Stadium: Olympic Stadium; Attendance: 8,000; Referee: Werner Föckler

25-10-1980 Matchday 11	MSV Duisburg	0–1	Bayern Munich	Duisburg
15:30 CET		Match Report	Niedermayer 77'	Stadium: Wedaustadion; Attendance: 28,000; Referee: Klaus Ohmsen

31-10-1980 Matchday 12	Bayern Munich	4–2	1. FC Nürnberg	Munich
20:00 CET	Rummenigge 10', 30', 59'; Horsmann 20'	Match Report	83' Eder; 85' Oberacher	Stadium: Olympic Stadium; Attendance: 50,000; Referee: Günter Risse

08-11-1980 Matchday 13	1. FC Kaiserslautern	4–2	Bayern Munich	Kaiserslautern
15:30 CET	Bongartz 13'; Funkel 50'; Briegel 65'; Melzer 75'	Match Report	21' Niedermayer; 75' Hoeneß	Stadium: Betzenbergstadion; Attendance: 34,000; Referee: Wolf-Dieter Ahlenfelder

15-11-1980 Matchday 14	Bayern Munich	1–1	1. FC Köln	Munich
15:30 CET	Dürnberger 3'	Match Report	9' Strack	Stadium: Olympic Stadium; Attendance: 25,000; Referee: Heinz Aldinger

29-11-1980 Matchday 15	Eintracht Frankfurt	0–0	Bayern Munich	Frankfurt
15:30 CET		Match Report		Stadium: Waldstadion; Attendance: 58,500; Referee: Robert Walz

06-12-1980 Matchday 16	Bayern Munich	4–0	Borussia Mönchengladbach	Munich
CET	Hoeneß 55', 70'; Augenthaler 59', 66'	Match Report		Stadium: Olympic Stadium; Attendance: 14,000; Referee: Volker Roth

13-12-1980 Matchday 17	Bayer Uerdingen	2–2	Bayern Munich	Krefeld
CET	Raschid 34'; Dremmler 38' (o.g.)	Match Report	52' Weiner; 79' (pen.) Breitner	Stadium: Grotenburg-Stadion; Attendance: 20,000; Referee: Rainer Waltert

17-01-1981 Matchday 18	Bayern Munich	1–1	Karlsruher SC	Munich
15:30 CET	Del'Haye 77'	Match Report	18' Bold	Stadium: Olympic Stadium; Attendance: 10,000; Referee: Jan Redelfs

24-01-1981 Matchday 19	Borussia Dortmund	2–2	Bayern Munich	Dortmund
15:30 CET	Wagner 25'; Huber 61' (pen.)	Match Report	4' Breitner; 86' Kraus	Stadium: Westfalenstadion; Attendance: 50,000; Referee: Walter Horstmann

07-02-1981 Matchday 20	Bayern Munich	3–2	Fortuna Düsseldorf	Munich
15:30 CET	Kraus 22', 76' Breitner 39' (pen.)	Match Report	51' Wenzel; 67' Allofs	Stadium: Olympic Stadium; Attendance: 10,000; Referee: Jürgen Meßmer

14-02-1981 Matchday 21	Schalke 04	2–2	Bayern Munich	Gelsenkirchen
15:30 CET	Fischer 4'; Bittcher 88'	Match Report	50' Kraus; 88' Rummenigge	Stadium: Parkstadion; Attendance: 70,600; Referee: Medardus Luca

21-02-1981 Matchday 22	Bayern Munich	5–1	Arminia Bielefeld	Munich
15:30 CET	Rummenigge 7' (pen.), 69'; Janzon 8'; Niedermayer 40', 43'	Match Report	52' Sackewitz	Stadium: Olympic Stadium; Attendance: 19,000; Referee: Klaus Clajus

07-03-1981 Matchday 23	Bayer Leverkusen	3–0	Bayern Munich	Leverkusen
15:30 CET	Ökland 4', 19', 24'	Match Report		Stadium: Ulrich-Haberland-Stadion; Attendance: 16,000; Referee: Udo Horeis

14-03-1981 Matchday 24	Bayern Munich	1–1	VfB Stuttgart	Munich
15:30 CET	Breitner 45'	Match Report	39' Allgöwer	Stadium: Olympic Stadium; Attendance: 61,000; Referee: Wolf-Dieter Ahlenfelder

21-03-1981 Matchday 25	Hamburger SV	2–2	Bayern Munich	Hamburg
15:30 CET	Felix Magath 48'; Hrubesch 54'	Match Report	67' Rummenigge; 89' Breitner	Stadium: Volksparkstadion; Attendance: 61,648; Referee: Walter Eschweiler

28-03-1981 Matchday 26	Bayern Munich	1–1	1860 Munich	Munich
15:30 CET	Horsmann 57'	Match Report	78' Scheller	Stadium: Olympic Stadium; Attendance: 63,000; Referee: Dieter Pauly

04-04-1981 Matchday 27	VfL Bochum	1–3	Bayern Munich	Bochum
15:30 CET	Hans-Joachim Abel 4'	Match Report	11' (pen.) Breitner; 70' Horsmann; 74' Rummenigge	Stadium: Ruhrstadion; Attendance: 42,000; Referee: Franz-Josef Hontheim

11-04-1981 Matchday 28	Bayern Munich	5–1	MSV Duisburg	Munich
CET	Rummenigge 21', 32', 47', 53'; Mathy 76'	Match Report	13' Dietz	Stadium: Olympic Stadium; Attendance: 20,000; Referee: Winfried Walz

16-04-1981 Matchday 29	1. FC Nürnberg	0–1	Bayern Munich	Nuremberg
20:00 CET		Match Report	75' Rummenigge	Stadium: Urban Stadium; Attendance: 60,000; Referee: Gerd Hennig

09-05-1981 Matchday 30	Bayern Munich	3–0	1. FC Kaiserslautern	Munich
15:30 CET	42' Niedermayer; 48' (pen.), 62' (pen.) Breitner	Match Report		Stadium: Olympic Stadium; Attendance: 56,000; Referee: Dieter Stäglich

16-05-1981 Matchday 31	1. FC Köln	0–3	Bayern Munich	Cologne
15:30 CET		Match Report	9' (pen.) Breitner; 15' Hoeneß; 75' Niedermayer	Stadium: Müngersdorfer Stadion; Attendance: 56,000; Referee: Jan Redelfs

30-05-1981 Matchday 32	Bayern Munich	7–2	Eintracht Frankfurt	Munich
15:30 CET	Kraus 54'; Breitner 60' (pen.), 64', 85'; Rummenigge 77' (pen.), 80'; Hoeneß 90'	Match Report	81' Borchers; 86' Cha	Stadium: Olympic Stadium; Attendance: 48,000; Referee: Walter Eschweiler

06-06-1981 Matchday 33	Borussia Mönchengladbach	1–4	Bayern Munich	Mönchengladbach
15:30 CET	Nielsen 76'	Match Reports	20', 56', 89' Rummenigge; 63' Niedermayer	Stadium: Bökelbergstadion; Attendance: 34,800; Referee: Werner Föckler

13-06-1981 Matchday 34	Bayern Munich	4–0	Bayer Uerdingen	Munich
CET	Niedermayer 53'; Rummenigge 64', 76' (pen.); Mathy 87'	Match Report		Stadium: Olympic Stadium; Attendance: 70,000; Referee: Manfred Uhlig

=== DFB-Pokal ===
27-08-1980 1st Round	Bayern Munich	2–0	Arminia Bielefeld	Munich
CET	Rummenigge 7', 14'	Match Report		Stadium: Olympic Stadium; Attendance: 8,000; Referee: Dieter Niebergall

04-10-1980 2nd Round	Bayern Munich	4–2	Waldhof Mannheim	Munich
CET	Rummenigge 9', 78'; Del'Haye 83'; Horsmann 89'	Match Report	57' Makan; 67' Respondek	Stadium: Olympic Stadium; Attendance: 5,000; Referee: Karl-Heinz Tritschler

22-11-1980 3rd Round	1. FC Kaiserslautern	2–1	Bayern Munich	Kaiserslautern
CET	Briegel 26'; Neues 71'	Match Report	86' Augenthaler	Stadium: Betzenbergstadion; Referee: Jan Redelfs

=== European Cup ===
==== Qualifying rounds ====
The first and second rounds were part of the qualifying section.

17-09-1980 1st Round	Olympiacos F.C.	2–4	Bayern Munich	Piraeus, Greece
	Galakos 22'; Ahlström 82'	Match Report	22', 64' Dremmler; 57' Rummenigge; 64' Kraus	Stadium: Georgios Karaiskakis Stadium; Attendance: 40,000; Referee: Károly Palotai

01-10-1980 1st Round	Bayern Munich	3–0	Olympiacos F.C.	Munich, West Germany
	Hoeneß 2'; Rummenigge 6'; Janzon 68' (pen.)	Match Report		Stadium: Olympic Stadium; Attendance: 9,400; Referee: Robert B. Valentine

22-10-1980 2nd Round	Bayern Munich	5–1	AFC Ajax	Munich, West Germany
	Dürnberger 45'; Rummenigge 51', 82'; Hoeneß 80', 90'	Match Report	37' Arnesen	Stadium: Olympic Stadium; Attendance: 50,000; Referee: Luigi Agnolin

05-11-1980 2nd Round	AFC Ajax	2–1	Bayern Munich	Amsterdam, Netherlands
	Wiggemansen 16'; Rijkaard 18'	Match Report	81' Rummenigge	Stadium: Olympic Stadium; Attendance: 11,000; Referee: Erich Linemayr

==== Knockout rounds ====
04-03-1981 Quarter-Finals	Bayern Munich	2–0	Baník Ostrava	Munich, West Germany
CET	Janzon 48'; Breitner 89' (pen.)	Match Report		Stadium: Olympic Stadium; Attendance: 18,000; Referee: Anders Mattsson

18-03-1981 Quarter-Finals	Baník Ostrava	2–4	Bayern Munich	Ostrava, Czechoslovakia
CET	Němec 12'; Lička 71'	Match Report	8' Hoeneß; 26' Kraus; 32' Röber; 38' Dürnberger	Stadium: Bazaly; Referee: John Hunting

08-04-1981 Semi-Finals	Liverpool F.C.	0–0	Bayern Munich	Liverpool, England
CET		Match Report		Stadium: Anfield; Attendance: 44,000; Referee: Vojtech Christov

22-04-1981 Semi-Finals	Bayern Munich	1–1	Liverpool F.C.	Munich, West Germany
CET	Rummenigge 88'	Match Report	81' Kennedy	Stadium: Olympic Stadium; Attendance: 78,000; Referee: Antonio José da Silva Garrido

== Roster and statistics ==
Squad Season 1980–81
Player	Nat.	Birthday	at FCB since	BL matches	BL goals	Cup matches	Cup goals	EC matches	EC goals	Total matches	Total goals
Goalkeepers
Walter Junghans	German	26 October 1958	1977	19	0	3	0	4	0	26	0
Manfred Müller	German	28 August 1947	1979	17	0	0	0	4	0	21	0
Defenders
Udo Horsmann	German	30 March 1952	1975	34	4	3	1	8	0	45	5
Klaus Augenthaler	German	26 September 1957	1976	33	5	3	1	7	0	43	6
Wolfgang Dremmler	German	12 July 1954	1979	33	1	3	0	8	2	44	2
Hans Weiner	German	29 November 1950	1979	31	1	1	0	6	0	38	1
Jan-Einar Aas	Norwegian	12 October 1955	1979	7	0	1	0	2	0	10	0
Georg Schwarzenbeck	German	3 April 1948	1966	0	0	0	0	0	0	0	0
Midfielders
Bernd Dürnberger	German	17 September 1953	1972	33	3	3	0	8	1	44	4
Kurt Niedermayer	German	25 November 1955	1977	32	9	3	0	7	0	42	9
Paul Breitner	German	5 September 1951	1978	30	17	2	0	8	1	40	18
Wolfgang Kraus	German	20 August 1953	1979	30	6	3	0	8	2	41	8
Jürgen Röber	German	25 December 1953	1980	14	0	2	0	3	1	19	1
Günter Güttler	German	31 May 1961	1980	1	0	0	0	0	0	1	0
Pasi Rautiainen	Finnish	18 July 1961	1980	1	0	0	0	0	0	1	0
Forwards
Karl-Heinz Rummenigge	German	25 September 1955	1974	34	29	3	4	8	6	45	39
Dieter Hoeneß	German	27 October 1953	1979	27	10	2	0	7	4	36	14
Norbert Janzon	German	21 December 1950	1977	24	1	3	0	4	2	31	3
Karl Del'Haye	German	18 August 1955	1980	13	1	3	1	5	0	21	2
Reinhold Mathy	German	12 April 1962	1980	3	2	0	0	0	0	3	2
