= 1983–84 DFB-Pokal =

Tournament details
- Country: West Germany
- Teams: 64

Final positions
- Champions: Bayern Munich
- Runners-up: Borussia Mönchengladbach

Tournament statistics
- Matches played: 69
- Top goal scorer: Michael Tönnies (6)

The 1983–84 DFB-Pokal was the 41st season of the annual German football cup competition. It began on 16 August 1983 and ended on 31 May 1984. In the final Bayern Munich defeated Borussia Mönchengladbach 8–7 on penalties to take their seventh title. It was the first time the cup final was decided by a penalty shootout. Controversy raged after the penalty shoot out. Lothar Matthäus was playing his last game for Moenchengladbach before his big Summer move to Bayern. He stepped up to take the first penalty for Borussia and missed. Loyal Borussia fans claimed foul. This was later denied by Matthäus.

== Matches ==
=== First round ===
16 August 1983
1. FSV Mainz 05	0 – 1	VfB Stuttgart
27 August 1983
FC 08 Homburg	0 – 6	Hertha BSC
28 August 1983
VfL Osnabrück	3 – 1	1. FC Nürnberg
Alemannia Aachen	1 – 0	VfL Bochum
FC Schalke 04	3 – 0	Fortuna Düsseldorf
SV Heidingsfeld	5 – 1	SV Göppingen
Hamburger SV	4 – 1	Borussia Dortmund
SV Waldhof Mannheim	3 – 1	Bayer 04 Leverkusen
KSV Hessen Kassel	0 – 3	FC Bayern Munich
Fortuna Köln	2 – 3	Borussia Mönchengladbach
MSV Duisburg	1 – 2	1. FC Kaiserslautern	(AET)
SV Werder Bremen	5 – 0	SV Darmstadt 98
SV 1916 Sandhausen	0 – 0	Bayer Uerdingen	(AET)
VfR Forst	1 – 6	1. FC Köln
SC Pfullendorf	0 – 7	Eintracht Braunschweig
Rot-Weiß Essen	3 – 4	Hannover 96
SC Charlottenburg	2 – 1	SG Wattenscheid 09
SC Freiburg	3 – 2	SG Union Solingen
SV Werder Bremen II	1 – 3	Stuttgarter Kickers
Rot-Weiß Lüdenscheid	3 – 2	SSV Ulm 1846
SC Herford	0 – 3	Karlsruher SC
1. FC Köln II	2 – 1	FC Gohfeld
SpVgg Fürth	2 – 1	TuS Lingen/Ems	(AET)
ASV Burglengenfeld	2 – 1	KSV Baunatal	(AET)
Arminia Hannover	1 – 2	SpVgg Neu-Isenburg
SC Ellingen-Bonefeld	2 – 3	Holstein Kiel
FC Augsburg	2 – 1	SpVgg Bayreuth	(AET)
Hummelsbütteler SV	1 – 6	Kickers Offenbach
FSV Frankfurt	1 – 3	Arminia Bielefeld
Göttingen 05	4 – 2	Eintracht Frankfurt
TuS Schloss Neuhaus	2 – 0	BV 08 Lüttringhausen
FV Hassia Bingen	4 – 4	1. FC Bocholt	(AET)

==== Replays ====
22 September 1983
Bayer Uerdingen	2 – 0	SV 1916 Sandhausen
1. FC Bocholt	3 – 2	FV Hassia Bingen

=== Second round ===
7 October 1983
FC Augsburg	0 – 6	FC Bayern Munich
Eintracht Braunschweig	2 – 1	VfL Osnabrück
Alemannia Aachen	1 – 0	SV Waldhof Mannheim
SC Charlottenburg	0 – 3	FC Schalke 04
SV Heidingsfeld	1 – 3	Hannover 96
Borussia Mönchengladbach	3 – 0	Arminia Bielefeld
1. FC Köln	6 – 2	Kickers Offenbach
SC Freiburg	1 – 4	Hamburger SV
Karlsruher SC	5 – 4	1. FC Kaiserslautern	(AET)
ASV Burglengenfeld	0 – 3	SV Werder Bremen
Holstein Kiel	1 – 2	Bayer Uerdingen
1. FC Bocholt	3 – 1	Stuttgarter Kickers
TuS Schloss Neuhaus	0 – 4	Hertha BSC
SpVgg Fürth	1 – 0	Rot-Weiß Lüdenscheid
SpVgg Neu-Isenburg	0 – 1	Göttingen 05
1. FC Köln II	1 – 8	VfB Stuttgart

=== Round of 16 ===
18 December 1983
SpVgg Fürth	0 – 6	Borussia Mönchengladbach
14 January 1984
Hannover 96	3 – 2	1. FC Köln
FC Schalke 04	2 – 1	Karlsruher SC
1. FC Bocholt	3 – 1	Eintracht Braunschweig	(AET)
VfB Stuttgart	1 – 1	Hamburger SV	(AET)
Bayer Uerdingen	0 – 0	FC Bayern Munich	(AET)
Alemannia Aachen	0 – 1	SV Werder Bremen	(AET)
Göttingen 05	0 – 1	Hertha BSC

==== Replays ====
31 January 1984
Hamburger SV	3 – 4	VfB Stuttgart	(AET)
FC Bayern Munich	1 – 0	Bayer Uerdingen

=== Quarter-finals ===
3 March 1984
Hannover 96	0 – 1	Borussia Mönchengladbach
1. FC Bocholt	1 – 2	FC Bayern Munich
13 March 1984
SV Werder Bremen	1 – 0	VfB Stuttgart
14 March 1984
Hertha BSC	3 – 3	FC Schalke 04	(AET)

==== Replay ====
27 March 1984
FC Schalke 04	2 – 0	Hertha BSC

=== Semi-finals ===
1 May 1984
18:00 CEST

Borussia Mönchengladbach	5–4 (a.e.t.)	Werder Bremen
Matthäus 40'; Ringels 44'; Rahn 76'; Criens 90+5', 107'	Report	Meier 42'; Möhlmann 77'; Sidka 80'; Reinders 82'

Bökelbergstadion, Mönchengladbach
Attendance: 34,500
Referee: Franz-Josef Hontheim (Trier)

2 May 1984
20:00 CEST

Schalke 04	6–6 (a.e.t.)	Bayern Munich
Kruse 13'; Thon 19', 61', 120+3'; Stichler 72'; Dietz 115'	Report	K.H. Rummenigge 3'; Mathy 12'; M. Rummenigge 20', 80'; Hoeneß 112', 118'

Parkstadion, Gelsenkirchen
Attendance: 70,600
Referee: Wolf-Günter Wiesel (Ottbergen)

==== Replay ====
9 May 1984
20:00 CEST

Bayern Munich	3–2	Schalke 04
K.H. Rummenigge 32', 79'; Hoeneß 44'	Report	Jakobs 50'; Opitz 72'

Olympiastadion, Munich
Attendance: 40,000
Referee: Hans-Joachim Osmers (Bremen)

=== Final ===
31 May 1984
18:00 CEST

Bayern Munich	1–1 (a.e.t.)	Borussia Mönchengladbach
Dremmler 82'	Report	Mill 33'
Penalties
Lerby (penalty scored); Nachtweih (penalty scored); Grobe (penalty scored); Augenthaler (penalty missed); K.H. Rummenigge (penalty scored); Dremmler (penalty scored); Martin (penalty scored); M. Rummenigge (penalty scored)	7–6	(penalty missed) Matthäus; (penalty scored) Herlovsen; (penalty scored) Borowka; (penalty scored) Bruns; (penalty scored) Hannes; (penalty scored) Criens; (penalty scored) Frontzeck; (penalty missed) Ringels

Waldstadion, Frankfurt
Attendance: 61,146
Referee: Volker Roth (Salzgitter)
