= 1982 DFB-Pokal final =

- Match programme cover
- Event: 1981–82 DFB-Pokal
Bayern Munich	1. FC Nürnberg
4	2
- Date: 1 May 1982
- Venue: Waldstadion, Frankfurt
- Referee: Gerd Hennig (Duisburg)
- Attendance: 61,000

The 1982 DFB-Pokal final decided the winner of the 1981–82 DFB-Pokal, the 39th season of Germany's knockout football cup competition. It was played on 1 May 1982 at the Waldstadion in Frankfurt. Bayern Munich won the match 4–2 against 1. FC Nürnberg, to claim their 6th cup title.

The Austrian Reinhold Hintermaier opened the scoring for underdogs Nürnberg after 30 minutes with a shot from about 40 meters away, before Werner Dreßel doubled Der Club's lead just prior to halftime. However, Bayern stormed back from the halftime deficit. Karl-Heinz Rummenigge got a goal back for Die Roten in the 54th minute, before Wolfgang Kraus scored the equalising goal in the 65th minute. Seven minutes later, Paul Breitner put Bayern ahead from the penalty spot, before Dieter Hoeneß sealed the victory for Bayern in the 89th minute.

The match is remembered for Bayern centre-forward Dieter Hoeneß, who had been injured during the match following a collision with Alois Reinhardt, resulting in a laceration to the forehead. Despite the injury, Hoeneß was persuaded to continue the match for the final hour while wearing a blood-soaked head bandage. He assisted Bayern's first goal, was responsible for the pass to Wolfgang Kraus off which Bayern won a penalty that was subsequently converted for the lead, and scored the last himself in the final minutes to seal the cup victory for Bayern. All three of the goals which Hoeneß played a role in involved him heading the ball. After the match, Hoeneß stated, "This is the most important victory of my career!" He later added, "I did not feel it, I just wanted to win the Pott!" Bayern president Willi O. Hoffmann said, "For this effort, Dieter deserves the Iron Cross."

== Route to the final ==
The DFB-Pokal began with 128 teams in a single-elimination knockout cup competition. There were a total of six rounds leading up to the final. Teams were drawn against each other, and the winner after 90 minutes would advance. If still tied, 30 minutes of extra time was played. If the score was still level, a replay would take place at the original away team's stadium. If still level after 90 minutes, 30 minutes of extra time was played. If the score was still level, a penalty shoot-out was used to determine the winner.

Note: In all results below, the score of the finalist is given first (H: home; A: away).

Bayern Munich		Round	1. FC Nürnberg
Opponent	Result	1981–82 DFB-Pokal	Opponent	Result
SC Jülich (H)	8–0	Round 1	1. FC Haßfurt (A)	2–0
SV Neckargerach (H)	5–1	Round 2	Arminia Bielefeld (A)	1–0
Borussia Dortmund (H)	4–0	Round 3	Fortuna Düsseldorf (H)	2–0
Freiburger FC (A)	3–0	Round of 16	Hannover 96 (A)	3–1
Werder Bremen (A)	2–1 (a.e.t.)	Quarter-finals	Borussia Mönchengladbach (H)	3–1
VfL Bochum (A)	2–1	Semi-finals	Hamburger SV (H)	2–0

== Match ==
=== Details ===
1 May 1982
17:00 CEST

Bayern Munich	4–2	1. FC Nürnberg
Rummenigge 54'; Kraus 65'; Breitner 72' (pen.); Hoeneß 89'	Report	Hintermaier 31'; Dreßel 44'

Waldstadion, Frankfurt
Attendance: 61,000
Referee: Gerd Hennig (Duisburg)

Bayern Munich	1. FC Nürnberg

GK	1	(West Germany) Manfred Müller
RB	2	(West Germany) Bertram Beierlorzer		(substituted off) 25'
CB	4	(West Germany) Hans Weiner
CB	5	(West Germany) Klaus Augenthaler	Booked
LB	3	(West Germany) Udo Horsmann
RM	10	(West Germany) Wolfgang Dremmler
CM	6	(West Germany) Wolfgang Kraus
CM	8	(West Germany) Paul Breitner (c)
LM	7	(West Germany) Bernd Dürnberger
CF	9	(West Germany) Dieter Hoeneß
CF	11	(West Germany) Karl-Heinz Rummenigge	Booked
Substitutes:
DF	14	(West Germany) Kurt Niedermayer		(substituted on) 25'
Manager:
(Hungary) Pál Csernai

GK	1	(West Germany) Rudi Kargus (c)
RB	2	(West Germany) Thomas Brunner		(substituted off) 74'
CB	3	(West Germany) Horst Weyerich
CB	4	(West Germany) Alois Reinhardt
LB	7	(West Germany) Peter Stocker
RM	8	(West Germany) Norbert Schlegel	Booked	(substituted off) 78'
CM	6	(West Germany) Norbert Eder
CM	5	(Austria) Reinhold Hintermaier
LM	10	(West Germany) Herbert Heidenreich
CF	9	(West Germany) Werner Heck	Booked
CF	11	(West Germany) Werner Dreßel
Substitutes:
DF	12	(West Germany) Dieter Lieberwirth		(substituted on) 78'
DF	14	(West Germany) Reinhard Brendel		(substituted on) 74'
Manager:
(West Germany) Udo Klug

Match rules

- 90 minutes.
- 30 minutes of extra time if necessary.
- Penalty shoot-out if scores still level.
- Maximum of two substitutions.
