= Herlovsen =

Herlovsen is a Norwegian surname. Notable people with the surname include:

- Isabell Herlovsen (born 1988), Norwegian footballer
- Kai Erik Herlovsen (born 1959), Norwegian footballer and manager
