= Olaf Thon =

German footballer (born 1966)

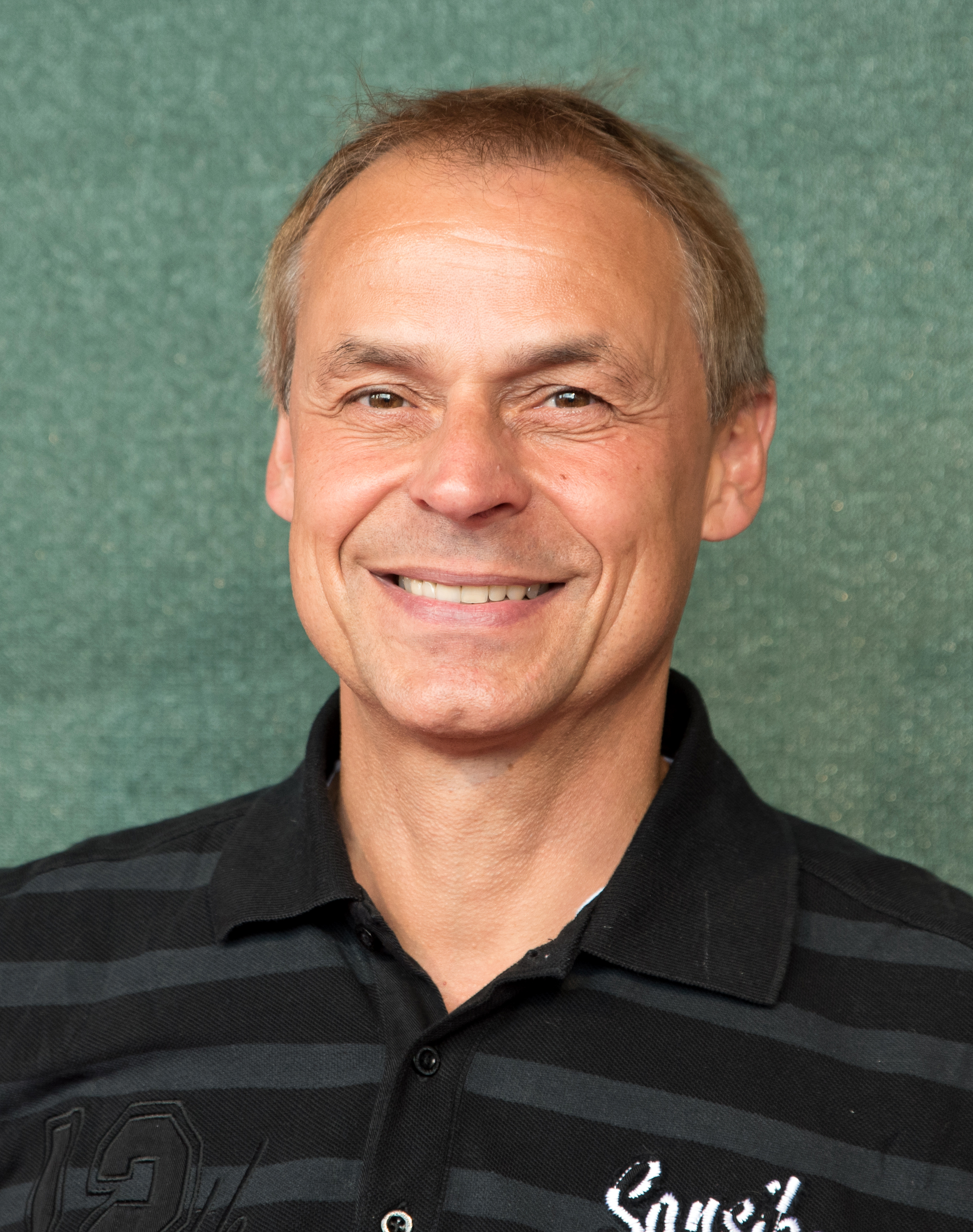
- Thon in 2016

Personal information
- Full name: Olaf Thon
- Date of birth: 1 May 1966 (age 60)
- Place of birth: Gelsenkirchen, West Germany
- Height: 1.70 m (5 ft 7 in)
- Positions: Midfielder; defender

Youth career
- 1972–1980: STV Horst-Emscher
- 1980–1983: Schalke 04

Senior career*
Years	Team	Apps	(Gls)
1983–1988	Schalke 04	167	(56)
1988–1994	Bayern Munich	148	(30)
1994–2002	Schalke 04	166	(10)
Total		481	(96)

International career
1983–1984	West Germany U18	10	(4)
1984–1985	West Germany U21	3	(2)
1984–1998	Germany	52	(3)

Managerial career
- 2010–2011: VfB Hüls
Medal record
Men's football
Representing Germany
FIFA World Cup
Winner	1990 Italy
Runner-up	1986 Mexico
- * Club domestic league appearances and goals

Olaf Thon (born 1 May 1966) is a German former professional football player and coach.

Mainly a central midfielder, Thon's 19-year professional career was solely associated to Schalke 04 and Bayern Munich, having amassed more than 500 official games and 100 goals for both combined. Later in his career, Thon played as a sweeper. Nicknamed The Professor, he also collected more than 50 caps for the Germany national team.

== Club career ==
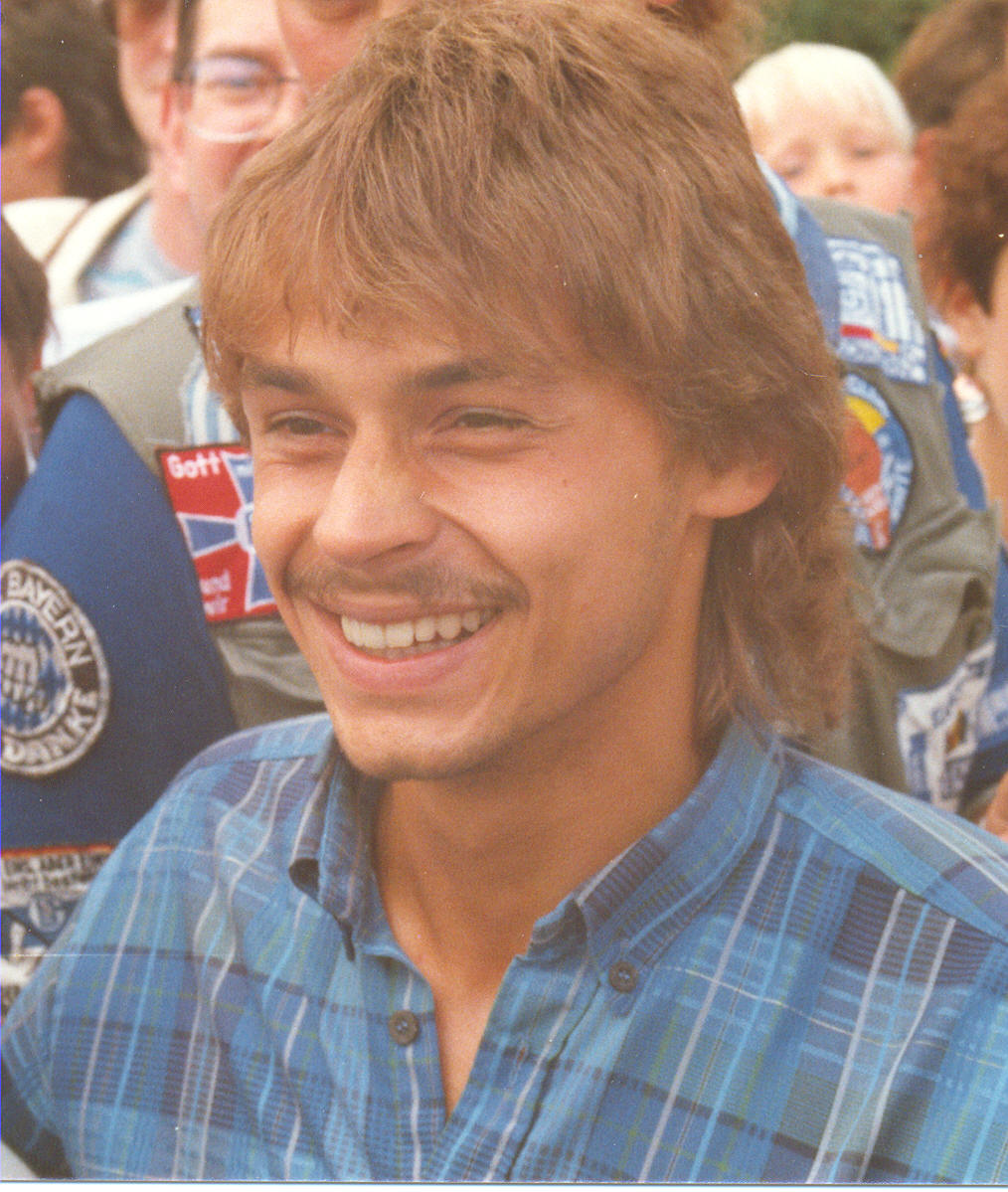
Thon in 1987

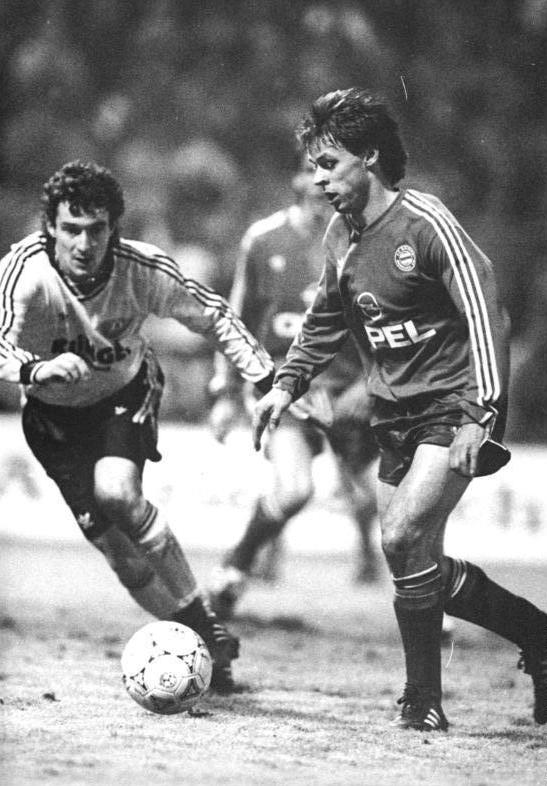
Thon with Bayern Munich in 1990

Thon made his professional debuts at the age of only 17, with local powerhouse FC Schalke 04. His impact was immediate, as he scored 14 goals in 38 games to help the Gelsenkirchen side return to the Bundesliga in 1984, as runners-up. Also during that season, he scored a hat-trick against Bayern Munich in the DFB-Pokal, in a 6–6 home thriller in the semi-final stage; the Bavarians eventually won the replay and the tournament.

On 24 August 1984, Thon made his first appearance in the German top level, a 3–1 loss at Borussia Mönchengladbach. During that and the following three seasons, he only scored once in single digits, rarely missing a match for the team.

In the summer of 1988, Thon signed with national giants FC Bayern Munich, as a replacement for Inter Milan-bound Lothar Matthäus. He scored eight in 32 games in his first season, helping the side to the league conquest, which also befell the following year, with the player posting an equal scoring record.

Thon returned to his first club Schalke in 1994, at the age of 28, after winning another league title, although he spent most of the season injured and Matthäus had already returned to Bayern. During his second spell, he played almost exclusively as a sweeper and, in his third year, played in a total of 46 official games, helping his club to the season's UEFA Cup final, where he scored his attempt in the penalty shootout win against Inter (1–1 on aggregate); Schalke could only finish 12th in the domestic league, however.

In his later years, Thon suffered extensively with injuries, only appearing in nine matches in his last two seasons combined. He retired in June 2002 at the age of 36, with Bundesliga totals of 443 games and 82 goals. Subsequently, he worked as marketing manager for the club, until August 2009.

== International career ==
Thon made his debut for Germany (then West Germany) on 16 December 1984, playing the second half of a 3–2 win in Malta for the 1986 FIFA World Cup qualifiers.

Subsequently, he was selected for the squads at three FIFA World Cups, helping the nation win the tournament in the 1990 edition in Italy: after only six minutes against Colombia in the group stage (1–1), he played the entire semifinal against England, also scoring in his penalty shootout attempt (1–1 after 120 minutes).

Thon also represented Germany at the UEFA Euro 1988 played on home soil, scoring through a rare header against Denmark (2–0 group stage win), and playing all the matches and minutes for the eventual semifinalists. Due to either injuries or run-ins with national team manager Berti Vogts, the player missed the 1994 World Cup and the Euro 1992 and 1996 tournaments, ending his 14-year international career with 52 caps (three goals). His last international match came against Iran in Germany's last group stage game during the 1998 FIFA World Cup.

== Managerial career ==
On 1 February 2010, Thon was appointed head coach of VfB Hüls, beginning to work on 3 April.

== Career statistics ==
=== Club ===
Appearances and goals by club, season and competition
Club	Season	League			Cup		Europe		Other		Total	
Club	Season	Division	Apps	Goals	Apps	Goals	Apps	Goals	Apps	Goals	Apps	Goals
Schalke 04	1983–84	2. Bundesliga	38	14	7	4	—		—		45	18
Schalke 04	1984–85	Bundesliga	34	10	4	2	—		—		38	12
Schalke 04	1985–86	Bundesliga	34	10	4	0	—		—		38	10
Schalke 04	1986–87	Bundesliga	33	8	1	0	—		—		34	8
Schalke 04	1987–88	Bundesliga	28	14	1	2	—		—		29	16
Schalke 04	Total		167	56	17	8	—		—		184	64
Bayern Munich	1988–89	Bundesliga	32	8	2	5	8	5	—		42	18
Bayern Munich	1989–90	Bundesliga	20	8	2	0	4	1	1 (Note: Appearance in DFB Supercup)	0	27	9
Bayern Munich	1990–91	Bundesliga	25	6	0	0	6	0	—		31	6
Bayern Munich	1991–92	Bundesliga	24	2	0	0	2	0	—		26	2
Bayern Munich	1992–93	Bundesliga	32	5	2	1	—		—		34	6
Bayern Munich	1993–94	Bundesliga	15	1	2	0	0	0	—		17	1
Bayern Munich	Total		148	30	8	6	20	6	1	0	177	42
Schalke 04	1994–95	Bundesliga	26	1	3	0	—		—		29	1
Schalke 04	1995–96	Bundesliga	30	3	3	0	—		—		33	3
Schalke 04	1996–97	Bundesliga	33	2	1	0	12	0	—		46	2
Schalke 04	1997–98	Bundesliga	29	1	0	0	6	1	—		35	2
Schalke 04	1998–99	Bundesliga	16	2	2	0	1	0	—		19	2
Schalke 04	1999–2000	Bundesliga	23	1	2	0	—		—		25	1
Schalke 04	2000–01	Bundesliga	4	0	1	0	—		—		5	0
Schalke 04	2001–02	Bundesliga	5	0	0	0	3	0	—		8	0
Schalke 04	Total		166	10	12	0	22	1	—		200	11
Career total			481	96	37	14	42	7	1	0	561	117

== Managerial statistics ==
As of 21 June 2021

Team	From	To	Record				
Team	From	To	G	W	D	L	Win %
VfB Hüls	3 April 2010	15 September 2011	49	16	9	24	32.65
Total			49	16	9	24	32.65

== Honours ==
Schalke 04

- UEFA Cup: 1996–97
- DFB-Pokal: 2000–01, 2001–02

Bayern Munich

- Bundesliga: 1988–89, 1989–90, 1993–94
- DFB-Supercup: 1990

Germany

- FIFA World Cup: 1990; runner-up: 1986
- U.S. Cup: 1993
