= Manfred Müller (footballer) =

German footballer

Personal information
- Date of birth: 28 July 1947 (age 79)
- Place of birth: Essen, Germany
- Height: 1.85 m (6 ft 1 in)
- Position: Goalkeeper

Senior career*
Years	Team	Apps	(Gls)
1966–1971	Schwarz-Weiß Essen		
1971–1976	Wuppertaler SV		
1976–1979	1. FC Nürnberg	86	(0)
1979	ESV Ingolstadt	1	(0)
1979–1984	Bayern Munich	48	(0)
1983	Calgary Mustangs		
1986	1. FC Nürnberg	1	(0)
- * Club domestic league appearances and goals

Manfred Müller (born 28 July 1947) is a German former footballer who played as a goalkeeper. Müller began his career with Schwarz-Weiß Essen, before moving to Wuppertaler SV in 1971. Wuppertal immediately earned promotion to the Bundesliga, and finished a surprising third in their first season in the top-flight. The title challenge was not to repeated, however, and the club struggled against relegation in 1973–74, and dropped down the following year. After Wuppertal's failure to bounce back in their first season, Müller left, moving south to in 1976 to join 1. FC Nürnberg. In his second season at Nürnberg, they won promotion, beating Rot-Weiss Essen in a playoff, only to be relegated the following year. Müller was on the move again, and after a brief spell at ESV Ingolstadt, moved on to Bayern Munich, ostensibly as cover for Walter Junghans. He did, though, manage a few decent runs in the first team, including an appearance in the 1982 European Cup Final, but eventually lost his place to the incoming Jean-Marie Pfaff, before retiring in 1984. He returned to 1. FC Nürnberg as general manager, and made a surprise return to action in November 1986, starting a Bundesliga fixture because of an injury to Andreas Köpke. He now runs a television production company. In 1983, he played for the Calgary Mustangs of the Canadian Professional Soccer League.

== Honours ==
- Regionalliga West: 1971–72
- Bundesliga: 1979–80, 1980–81
- DFB-Pokal: 1981–82, 1983–84
- European Cup: Runner-up 1981–82
