= Michael Opitz =

German footballer (1962–2026)

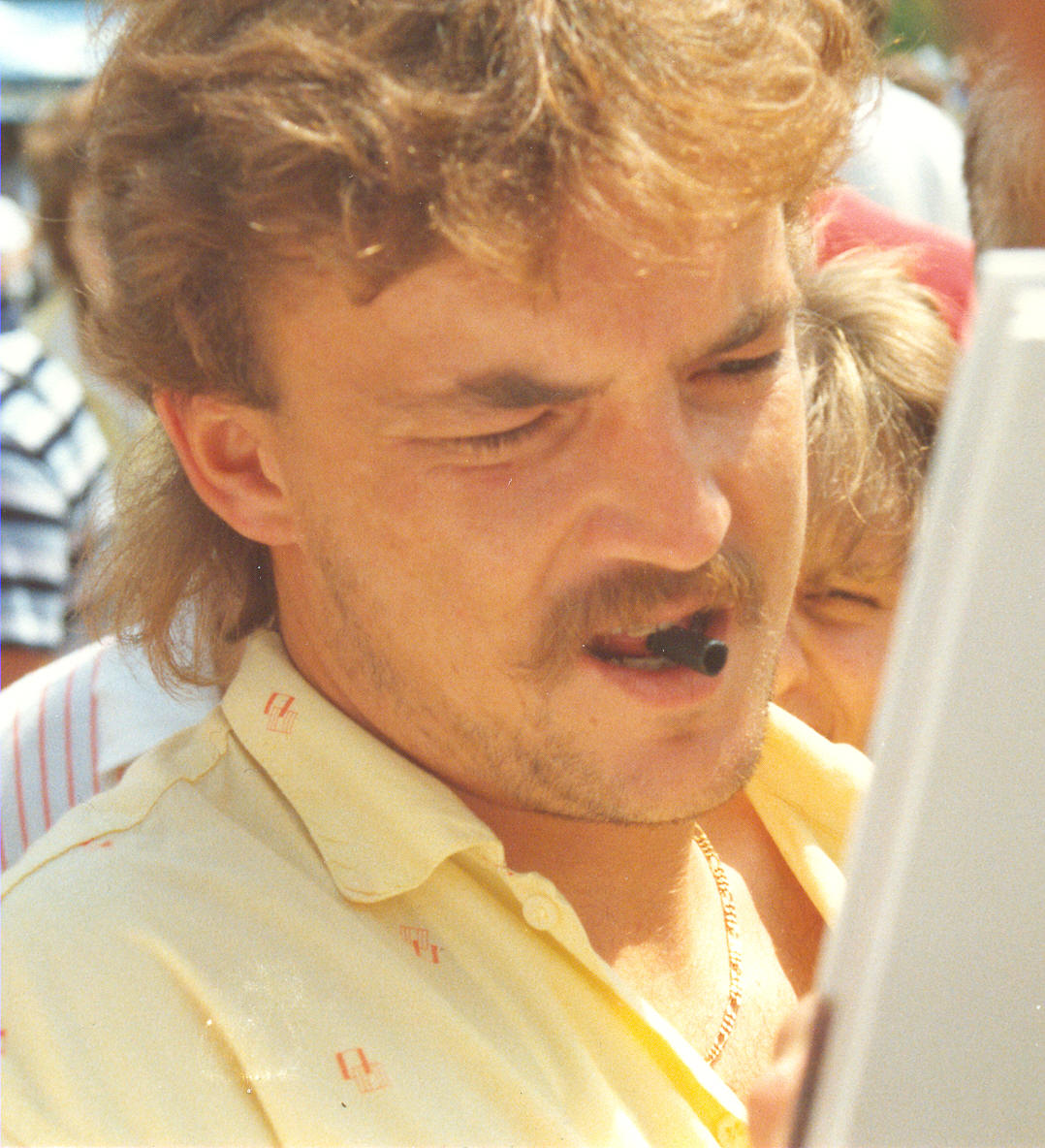
- Opitz in 1987

Personal information
- Date of birth: 16 July 1962
- Place of birth: Finnentrop, North Rhine-Westphalia, West Germany
- Date of death: 20 January 2026 (aged 63)
- Place of death: Finnentrop, North Rhine-Westphalia, Germany
- Height: 1.75 m (5 ft 9 in)
- Position: Defensive midfielder

Youth career
- 1976–1979: Schalke 04

Senior career*
Years	Team	Apps	(Gls)
1979–1988	Schalke 04	224	(12)
1988–1990	Sportfreunde Siegen		

International career
1982	West Germany U-21	2	(0)
- * Club domestic league appearances and goals

Michael Opitz (16 July 1962 – 20 January 2026) was a German footballer who played as a defensive midfielder for Schalke 04. He completed 158 matches in the Bundesliga and made 66 appearances in the 2. Bundesliga for the club.

Opitz died on 20 January 2026, at the age of 63.
