= Reinhold Mathy =

German former footballer (born 1962)

Personal information
- Date of birth: 12 April 1962 (age 64)
- Place of birth: Memmingen, West Germany
- Height: 1.75 m (5 ft 9 in)
- Position: Forward

Youth career
- –1979: FC Memmingen
- 1979–1980: Bayern Munich

Senior career*
Years	Team	Apps	(Gls)
1980–1987	Bayern Munich	100	(21)
1987–1990	Bayer Uerdingen	78	(13)
1990–1992	FC Wettingen	22	(4)
1992–1993	Hannover 96	11	(0)
Total		211	(38)

International career
1979–1980	West Germany U-18	6	(0)
1982–1984	West Germany U-21	7	(6)
- * Club domestic league appearances and goals

Reinhold Mathy (born 12 April 1962) is a German former footballer who played as a forward. He played for Bayern Munich for seven years, winning four German titles and three cups. He retired due to an injury in 1993.

== Career ==
Mathy joined Bayern Munich's youth team in 1979, and made his first-team debut a year later, as a substitute for Norbert Janzon in a 3–1 win over VfL Bochum. He made two more substitute appearances in the 1980–81 season, replacing Dieter Hoeneß and scoring both times, as Bayern ended the season as German champions. The following season he made seventeen appearances without getting on the scoresheet, the last of which was the European Cup Final – he started the match, which Bayern lost 1–0 against Aston Villa, being replaced by Günter Güttler after 51 minutes. Bayern had more luck in the DFB-Pokal, beating 1. FC Nürnberg in the final, which Mathy didn't play in.

By the 1983–84 season Mathy had established himself in Bayern's first team, making 22 league appearances as he won a second Bundesliga title, and a second cup win – he came on as a substitute for Wolfgang Kraus in the final, in which Bayern beat Borussia Mönchengladbach on penalties. 1984–85 was Mathy's prolific season with Bayern – he scored seven goals on the way to another league title, and another cup final, a defeat to Bayer Uerdingen which Mathy missed.

1985–86 brought another league and cup double – this time Mathy started the cup final, a 5–2 win over VfB Stuttgart, and a personal highlight was a hattrick in a 4–2 win over Austria Vienna in the Cup Winners' Cup, helping Bayern on the way to the semi-final. The following season brought early European success for Mathy, too – he scored two goals to settle a European Cup first round win against PSV Eindhoven, and won a third consecutive German title, but missed the entire second half of the season, including the 1987 European Cup Final, which Bayern lost against FC Porto.

Mathy left Bayern in at the end of the 1986–87 season having made exactly 100 Bundesliga appearances for the club, signing for Bayer Uerdingen. He spent three years with the Krefeld club, forming a successful attacking line-up with Stefan Kuntz and Marcel Witeczek, and achieving mostly mid-table finishes. In 1990, he moved to Switzerland to sign for FC Wettingen, where he spent two years, before returning to Germany to sign for Hannover 96. After injuries restricted him to eleven appearances in his first season with Hannover, he retired from football in 1993.

== Honours ==
Bayern Munich

- Bundesliga: 1980–81, 1984–85, 1985–86, 1986–87
- DFB-Pokal: 1981–82, 1983–84, 1985–86
- European Cup: Runner-up 1981–82
