= Karl Del'Haye =

German footballer

Kalle Del'Haye
Personal information
- Full name: Karl Del'Haye
- Date of birth: 18 August 1955 (age 71)
- Place of birth: Aachen, West Germany
- Height: 1.69 m (5 ft 7 in)
- Position: Left winger

Youth career
- 1962–1973: Alemannia Aachen

Senior career*
Years	Team	Apps	(Gls)
1973–1974	Alemannia Aachen	24	(4)
1974–1980	Borussia Mönchengladbach	97	(14)
1980–1985	Bayern Munich	74	(7)
1985–1987	Fortuna Düsseldorf	23	(0)
Total		218	(25)

International career
1973–1974	West Germany Youth	11	(3)
1978–1981	West Germany B	6	(2)
1980	West Germany	2	(0)
1983	West Germany Olympic	3	(0)
Medal record
Representing West Germany
UEFA European Championship
Winner	1980 Italy
- * Club domestic league appearances and goals

Karl (Kalle) Del'Haye (born 18 August 1955) is a German former footballer who played as a winger.

== Club career ==
He is best remembered as a Borussia Mönchengladbach player, but also played for Alemannia Aachen, Bayern Munich and Fortuna Düsseldorf in the West German top-flight.

== International career ==
Del'Haye was capped twice by West Germany, and was part of the winning squad at Euro 1980.

== Honours ==
=== Club ===
Borussia Mönchengladbach

- Bundesliga: 1974–75, 1975–76, 1976–77
- UEFA Cup: 1974–75, 1978–79; Runner-up 1979–80
- European Cup: Runner-up 1976–77

Bayern Munich

- Bundesliga: 1980–81, 1984–85
- DFB-Pokal: 1981–82, 1983–84; Runner-up 1984–85
- European Cup: Runner-up 1981–82

Fortuna Düsseldorf

- Intertoto Cup: 1986

=== International ===
West Germany

- European Championship: 1980
