= Norbert Meier =

German footballer and manager

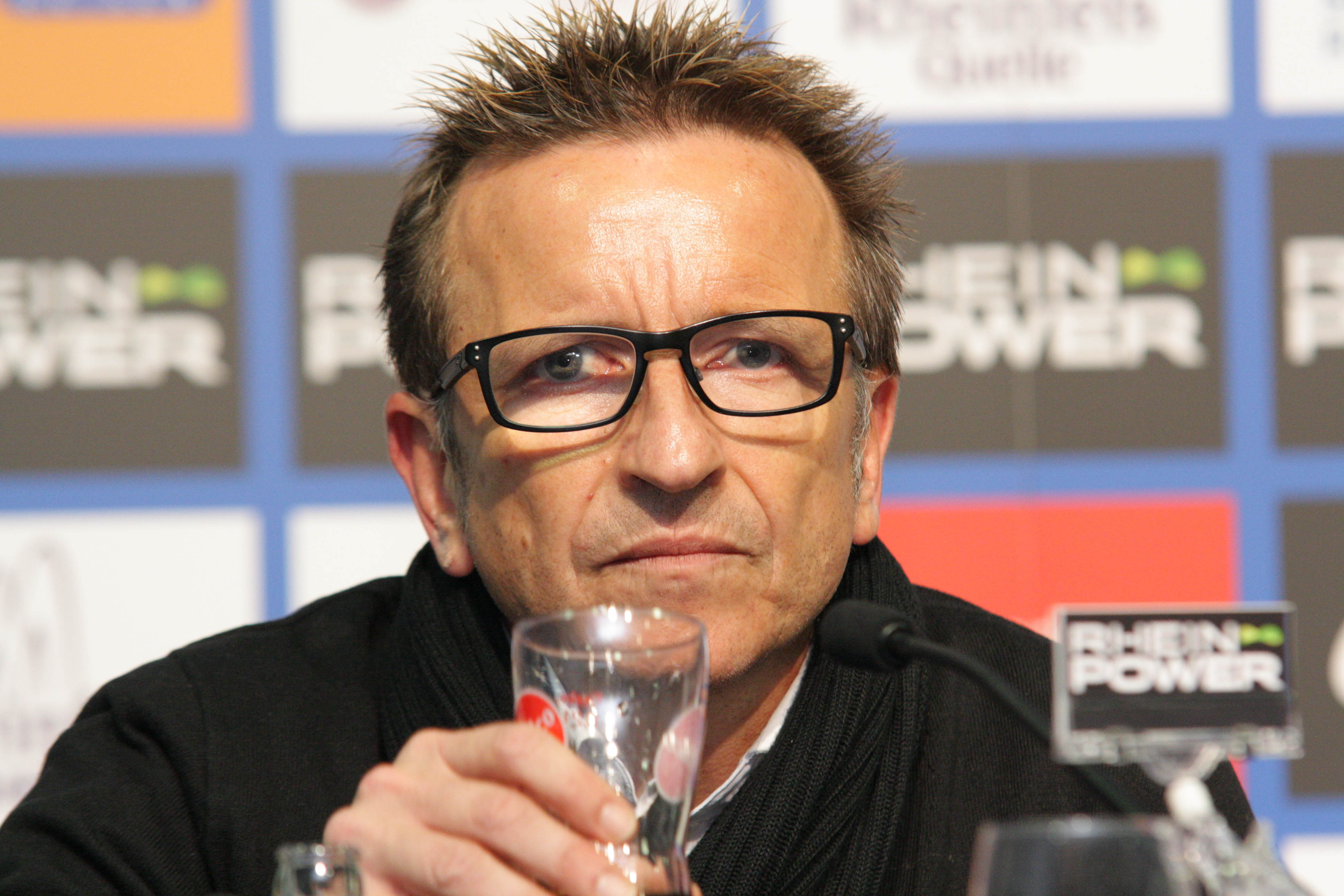
- Meier in 2011

Personal information
- Date of birth: 20 September 1958 (age 68)
- Place of birth: Reinbek, West Germany
- Height: 1.73 m (5 ft 8 in)
- Position: Midfielder

Senior career*
Years	Team	Apps	(Gls)
1980–1989	Werder Bremen	281	(82)
1990–1992	Borussia Mönchengladbach	50	(2)
Total		331	(84)

International career
1981–1982	West Germany B	3	(0)
1982–1985	West Germany	16	(2)

Managerial career
- 1997–1998: Borussia Mönchengladbach
- 2003–2005: MSV Duisburg
- 2006–2007: Dynamo Dresden
- 2008–2013: Fortuna Düsseldorf
- 2014–2016: Arminia Bielefeld
- 2016: Darmstadt 98
- 2017: 1. FC Kaiserslautern
- 2019: KFC Uerdingen
- * Club domestic league appearances and goals

Norbert Meier (born 20 September 1958) is a German former football player, who played as a midfielder, and manager who last managed KFC Uerdingen.

== Playing career ==
Meier's career as a player was spent mostly at SV Werder Bremen where he played first team football from 1980 to 1990. During this time he also made 16 appearances for West Germany in midfield scoring twice.

Meier ended his playing days at Borussia Mönchengladbach, where he played two and a half years.

== Coaching career ==
=== Borussia Mönchengladbach ===
Meier started his coaching career by taking over the reserve side of Borussia Mönchengladbach on 1 July 1996. Meier coached them until 30 November 1997. Meier coached the senior squad between 1 December 1997 and 1 April 1998. Meier rejoined the reserve team on 1 July 1998.

=== MSV Duisburg ===
Meier officially took over for MSV Duisburg on 1 January 2003. Meier is most recently noted as coach at MSV Duisburg when he lost his temper in their match against 1. FC Köln on 6 December 2005. In the 82nd minute, Meier was arguing with Köln's Albert Streit when Meier suddenly fell down. Referee Manuel Gräfe sent Streit off with a red card. After the incident was reviewed on television, it became clear that it had not been Streit who hit Meier, but that Meier was play-acting. In fact, Meier had given Streit a headbutt. The club sacked Meier on 8 December 2005. The German FA banned him for three months from any management activities on 15 December 2005.

=== Dynamo Dresden ===
Dynamo Dresden presented Meier as the new manager on 10 September 2006. Meier was sacked on 24 September 2007.

=== Fortuna Düsseldorf ===
Fortuna Düsseldorf hired Meier on 1 January 2008. He was responsible for Fortuna’s return into the Bundesliga after it spent more than ten years in league 3 and 2. Meier was sacked after being relegated after the 2012–13 season.

=== Arminia Bielefeld ===
Meier took over Arminia Bielefeld on 24 February 2014.

=== Darmstadt 98 ===
He was appointed as the new head coach of Darmstadt 98 on 10 June 2016. On 5 December 2016, he was sacked.

=== 1. FC Kaiserslautern ===
On 3 January 2017, Meier was appointed as manager of 1. FC Kaiserslautern. He signed a contract until June 2018. Meier was sacked on 20 September 2017.

=== KFC Uerdingen ===
Meier took over KFC Uerdingen on 3 February 2019. He was sacked on 15 March 2019.

== Managerial statistics ==
As of 3 January 2017

Team	From	To	Record					
Team	From	To	G	W	D	L	Win %	Ref.
Borussia Mönchengladbach II	1 July 1996	30 November 1997	—					
Borussia Mönchengladbach	1 December 1997	1 April 1998	11	2	4	5	18.18	
Borussia Mönchengladbach II	1 July 1998	30 June 2001	94	40	27	27	42.55	
MSV Duisburg	1 January 2003	8 December 2005	108	42	25	41	38.89	
Dynamo Dresden	10 September 2006	24 September 2007	44	16	14	14	36.36	
Fortuna Düsseldorf	1 January 2008	27 May 2013	200	91	49	60	45.50	
Arminia Bielefeld	24 February 2014	10 June 2016	92	36	32	24	39.13	
SV Darmstadt 98	10 June 2016	5 December 2016	15	3	2	10	20.00	
1. FC Kaiserslautern	3 January 2017	19 September 2017	24	6	6	12	25.00	
KFC Uerdingen	3 February 2019	15 March 2019	7	0	3	4	0.00	
Total			595	236	162	197	39.66	—

== Honours ==
=== Player ===
Werder Bremen

- Bundesliga: 1987–88; runner-up: 1982–83, 1984–85, 1985–86
- DFB-Pokal finalist: 1988–89, 1989–90
- DFL-Supercup: 1988

Borussia Mönchengladbach

- DFB-Pokal finalist: 1991–92

=== Manager ===
Individual

- 3. Liga Manager of the Year: 2014–15
