= Norbert Ringels =

German footballer

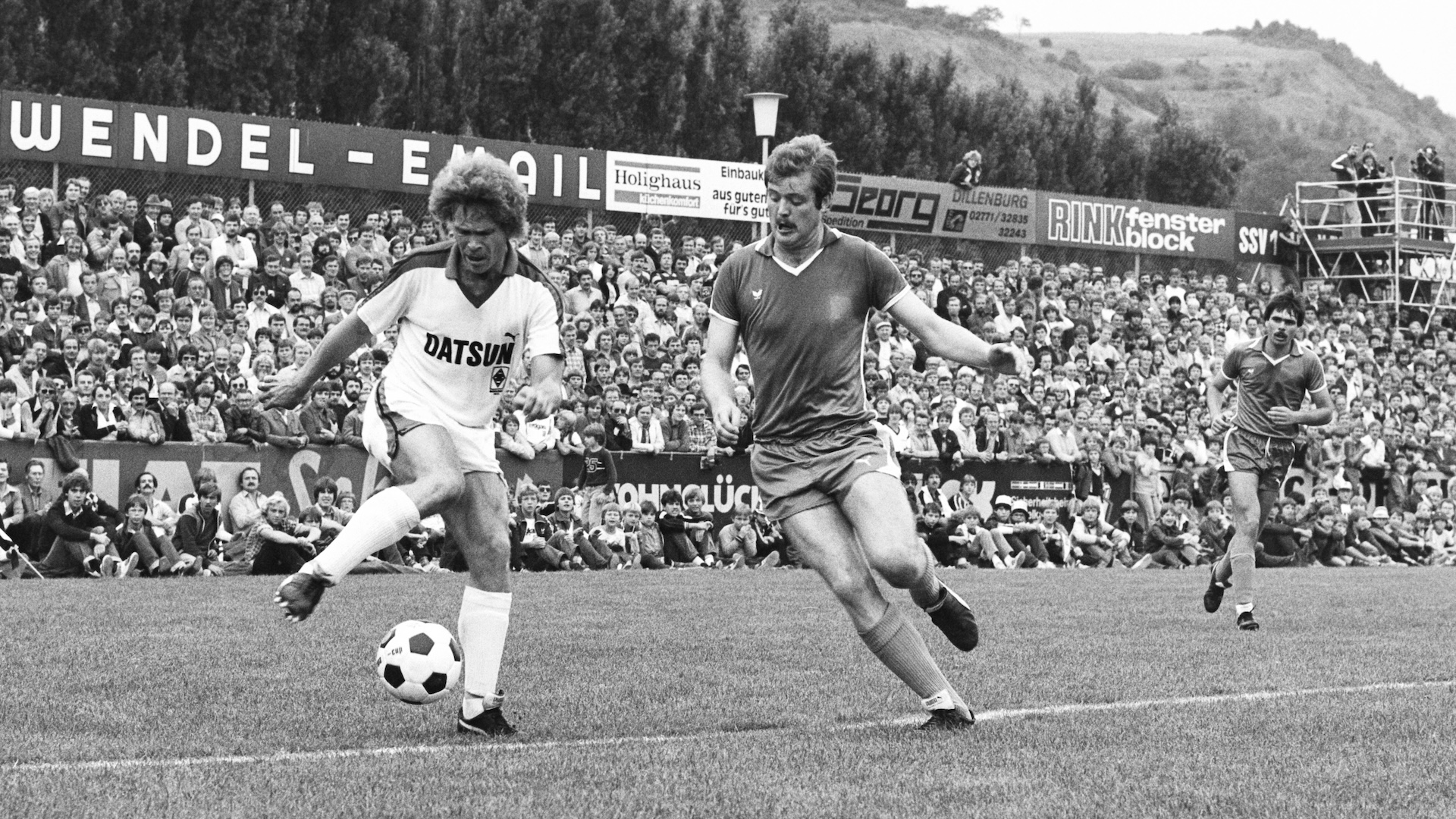
- Ringels (left) in 1981

Personal information
- Full name: Norbert Ringels
- Date of birth: 16 September 1956 (age 70)
- Place of birth: Mönchengladbach, West Germany
- Height: 1.77 m (5 ft 9 1/2 in)
- Position: Defender

Senior career*
Years	Team	Apps	(Gls)
1975–1985	Borussia Mönchengladbach	163	(6)
1985–1987	VVV-Venlo	62	(2)
1987–1988	Rheydter SV		
- * Club domestic league appearances and goals as of 15:34, 17 February 2009 (UTC)

Norbert Ringels (born 16 September 1956) is a retired German football player. He spent ten seasons in the Bundesliga with Borussia Mönchengladbach, where he was known as "Nonno" to his teammates.

== Honours ==
- Bundesliga: 1975–76, 1976–77; runner-up: 1977–78
- DFB-Pokal: runner-up 1983–84
- European Cup: runner-up 1976–77
- UEFA Cup: 1978–79; runner-up 1979–80
