= Thomas Kruse =

German association football player

Personal information
- Date of birth: 7 September 1959 (age 67)
- Place of birth: Recklinghausen, West Germany
- Height: 1.78 m (5 ft 10 in)
- Position: Defender

Youth career
- 1975–1978: Schalke 04

Senior career*
Years	Team	Apps	(Gls)
1978–1988	Schalke 04	262	(6)
1988–1989	FC Remscheid		
1989–1991	DSC Wanne-Eickel		

International career
1979–1980	West Germany U-21	4	(0)
1978–1979	West Germany B	2	(0)
- * Club domestic league appearances and goals

Thomas Kruse (born 7 September 1959) is a German former professional footballer who played as a defender for Schalke 04. He completed 199 matches in the Bundesliga and made 63 appearances in the 2. Bundesliga for the club.
