= Michael Jakobs =

German footballer (born 1959)

Personal information
- Date of birth: 18 July 1959 (age 67)
- Place of birth: Oberhausen, West Germany
- Height: 1.82 m (6 ft 0 in)
- Position: Defender

Senior career*
Years	Team	Apps	(Gls)
1978–1980	SG Wattenscheid 09	52	(9)
1980–1983	VfL Bochum	88	(2)
1983–1988	FC Schalke 04	134	(7)
1988–1991	Hertha BSC	69	(0)

International career
1982	West Germany B	1	(0)
- * Club domestic league appearances and goals

Michael Jakobs (born 18 July 1959) is a retired German football player.
