= Hans-Günter Bruns =

German football manager (born 1954)

Personal information
- Full name: Hans-Günter Bruns
- Date of birth: 15 November 1954 (age 72)
- Place of birth: Mülheim an der Ruhr, West Germany
- Height: 1.79 m (5 ft 10 in)
- Positions: Defender; midfielder

Team information
- Current team: SC 1920 Oberhausen (head coach)

Youth career
- 1971–1973: Schalke 04

Senior career*
Years	Team	Apps	(Gls)
1973–1976	Schalke 04	20	(2)
1976–1978	SG Wattenscheid 09	58	(25)
1978–1979	Borussia Mönchengladbach	30	(6)
1979–1980	Fortuna Düsseldorf	15	(0)
1980–1990	Borussia Mönchengladbach	301	(55)
Total		424	(88)

International career
1984	West Germany	4	(0)

Managerial career
- 2003–2004: Adler Osterfeld
- 2004–2005: VfB Speldorf
- 2005–2006: SSVg Velbert
- 2006–2008: Rot-Weiß Oberhausen
- 2008–2011: Rot-Weiß Oberhausen (athletic director)
- 2010–2011: Rot-Weiß Oberhausen
- 2011–2012: Wuppertaler SV
- 2013: SSVg Velbert
- 2014–2017: SSVg Velbert
- 2017–2019: BW Oberhausen-Lirich
- 2020–: SC 1920 Oberhausen
- * Club domestic league appearances and goals

Hans-Günter Bruns (born 15 November 1954) is a German former professional footballer who played as a midfielder.

== Overview ==
As a player, Bruns resorted to a playstyle involving the creation of bursting runs from deep in midfield. He supported attacks, instigated moves and helped defend his back-line, a common position in German football in the '70s and '80s. Bruns was powerfully built, technically good, a strong tackler, and tactically excellent.

Having started out as a midfielder for Schalke, he later became part of the glorious Gladbach side that won the 1979 UEFA Cup. Bruns was at Gladbach twice, with his second stint lasting 10 years and encompassing 301 Bundesliga appearances, scoring 55 goals. Bruns is also part of Bundesliga folklore, when during a game against Bayern Munich, he ran past almost every opposition player before seeing his shot strike both posts and fail to go in.

Years after his retirement, he achieved mild publicity as a result of a video shared on various video streaming and social media sites. The video, showing a clip from a separate match played in 1983 between Borussia Mönchengladbach and FC Bayern Munich, titled The Greatest Goal Never Scored, showed Bruns collecting the ball under pressure near his own corner flag, beating three Bayern Munich players as he ran almost the entire length of the pitch, exchanging a pass with a Borussia Mönchengladbach striker that allowed him on goal, only for his shot to hit the inside of one post, roll across goal and hit the other post, before rebounding into the arms of the Munich keeper.

== Career ==
Bruns did not register with a football club in his hometown until he was 11 years old, having spent many years playing soccer on the street. At 17, he moved to Schalke 04.

In the Bundesliga he was active from 1973 to 1990, playing for FC Schalke 04, SG Wattenscheid 09, Fortuna Düsseldorf and Borussia Mönchengladbach (twice). In his first years as a professional, he played in midfield, later especially on the Libero position. In 1979, he was in the squad of the team Borussia Mönchengladbach, the UEFA Cup winner, and scored on the way to the final matches against Red Star Belgrade, in which he did not participate, one goal against Benfica and Manchester City. In 1980 he was DFB Cup winner with Fortuna Düsseldorf, 1984 he lost with Borussia Mönchengladbach in the final of the same competition to FC Bayern Munich on penalties.

Bruns is responsible for one of the most famous near-goals in Bundesliga history. In the 1983/84 season he sprinted in Munich in the game against Bayern with a solo run past the opposing team behind the entire field. His shot hit the left inner post, the ball rolled on the goal line to the right post and jumped from there back into the field, where the Munich defense could then clear.

== International career ==
He earned four caps for the West Germany national football team in 1984. He was included in the West German team for the 1984 UEFA European Football Championship but did not play in a match.

== Coaching career ==
After retiring from professional football, Bruns initially worked as an insurance agent. In addition, he trained Adler Osterfeld in the Oberliga Nordrhein, later the VfB Speldorf in his hometown Mülheim and the SSVg Velbert. From 2006 he was coach of Rot-Weiß Oberhausen and led the club in 2007 as the champion of the Oberliga Nordrhein back to the Regionalliga and in the successor season 2008 in the 2nd Bundesliga. In the season 2008/09 he moved to Rot-Weiss Oberhausen on the position of Sporting Director and thus exchanged with Jürgen Lugingerthe tasks. After Luginger had due to a persistent negative series on 1 February 2010 made his post available, Bruns jumped in as interim coach. On April 22, 2010, however, it was announced that he will retain both offices permanently in the 2010–11 season. On February 22, 2011, was decided after the 1: 3 against VfL Osnabrück and due to disagreements within the club, to separate. Hans Günter Bruns was replaced one day later by Theo Schneider.

On September 22, 2011, Bruns was introduced as the new coach of the regional league Wuppertal SV. He took over the succession of Karsten Hutwelker, from which the club had split three days earlier. In November 2012 Bruns was released again from his duties in Wuppertal. After a half year break, he took over again in April 2013, the coaching post at the SSVg Velbert, but had to give it back in November 2013 due to the athletic descent of the club again.

In April 2014, the Oberhausen country league club DJK/Arminia Klosterhardt announced that he had committed Bruns as head coach for the new 2014–15 season (following the departure of Michael Lorenz).

On 10 February 2020, he was appointed head coach of SC 1920 Oberhausen.

== Honours ==
Schalke 04

- Bundesliga runner-up: 1976–77

Fortuna Düsseldorf

- DFB-Pokal: 1979–80

Borussia Mönchengladbach

- UEFA Cup: 1978–79
- DFB-Pokal finalist: 1983–84
