= Uwe Rahn =

German footballer (born 1962)

Personal information
- Date of birth: 21 May 1962 (age 64)
- Place of birth: Mannheim, West Germany
- Height: 1.84 m (6 ft 0 in)
- Positions: Attacking midfielder; forward

Youth career
- 1970–1975: TSV Schönau
- 1975–1980: Waldhof Mannheim

Senior career*
Years	Team	Apps	(Gls)
1980–1988	Borussia Mönchengladbach	227	(81)
1988–1990	1. FC Köln	43	(13)
1990–1991	Hertha BSC	21	(5)
1991–1992	Fortuna Düsseldorf	15	(5)
1992–1993	Eintracht Frankfurt	12	(3)
1993–1994	Urawa Reds	7	(1)
Total		325	(108)

International career
1982–1984	West Germany U-21	3	(0)
1984	West Germany Olympic	5	(4)
1984–1987	West Germany	14	(5)
- * Club domestic league appearances and goals

Uwe Rahn (born 21 May 1962) is a German former professional footballer who played as an attacking midfielder or forward.

== Career ==
Rahn played 318 Bundesliga matches in his professional career, scoring the majority of his 107 Bundesliga goals in his eight years at Borussia Mönchengladbach. Rahn scored 24 goals in the 1986-87 season of the Bundesliga, fourteen in the course of the final nine weeks of the season. He also scored six and four goals in the DFB-Pokal and UEFA Cup, helping the club reach the semi-finals of both competitions. Subsequent to this achievement, Rahn was awarded Footballer of the Year (Germany) in 1987, but only received Kicker's cannon trophy in 2019, which was mistakenly given to fellow Mannheim native Fritz Walter), who had scored 23 goals for Waldhof Mannheim. Potential transfers to PSV Eindhoven and Bayern Munich failed due to transfer fees. After a decent 1987-88 season where he scored 14 goals in 29 games overall, Rahn's form dipped, and he'd be transferred to clubs like 1. FC Köln, Hertha BSC, Fortuna Düsseldorf and Eintracht Frankfurt. With Franz Beckenbauer's help, he was transferred to Urawa Red Diamonds, where he ended his career.

Rahn appeared in a total of 14 matches for West Germany in between 1984 and 1987. In those games he scored five goals, the most important of them seconds after coming on as a second-half substitute for Felix Magath on his debut against Sweden in a World Cup qualifier on 17 October 1984. Hampered by injury, he was part of the 1986 FIFA World Cup squad of his nation but did not come to action in the tournament. Rahn also competed for West Germany at the 1984 Summer Olympics.

Rahn is not related to Helmut Rahn, the 1954 FIFA World Cup-winning goalscorer of West Germany, although he was often approached by people to get an autograph from Helmut, believing he was Uwe's father.

== Style of play ==
Originally a playmaker, Rahn eventually became an attacking midfielder-striker hybrid known for his finishing and aerial abilities.

== Career statistics ==
=== Club ===
Appearances and goals by club, season and competition
Club	Season	League			National Cup		League Cup		Total	
Club	Season	Division	Apps	Goals	Apps	Goals	Apps	Goals	Apps	Goals
Borussia Mönchengladbach	1980–81	Bundesliga	14	3					14	3
Borussia Mönchengladbach	1981–82	Bundesliga	30	2					30	2
Borussia Mönchengladbach	1982–83	Bundesliga	24	3					24	3
Borussia Mönchengladbach	1983–84	Bundesliga	31	14					31	14
Borussia Mönchengladbach	1984–85	Bundesliga	34	14					34	14
Borussia Mönchengladbach	1985–86	Bundesliga	28	9					28	9
Borussia Mönchengladbach	1986–87	Bundesliga	31	24					31	24
Borussia Mönchengladbach	1987–88	Bundesliga	25	12					25	12
Borussia Mönchengladbach	1988–89	Bundesliga	10	0					10	0
Borussia Mönchengladbach	Total		227	81					227	81
1. FC Köln	1988–89	Bundesliga	20	7					20	7
1. FC Köln	1989–90	Bundesliga	23	6					23	6
1. FC Köln	Total		43	13					43	13
Hertha BSC	1990–91	Bundesliga	21	5					21	5
Fortuna Düsseldorf	1991–92	Bundesliga	15	5					15	5
Eintracht Frankfurt	1992–93	Bundesliga	12	3					12	3
Urawa Reds	1993	J1 League	7	1	2	0	4	0	13	1
Urawa Reds	1994	J1 League	0	0	0	0	0	0	0	0
Urawa Reds	Total		7	1	2	0	4	0	13	1
Career total			325	108	2	0	4	0	331	108

=== International ===
Appearances and goals by national team and year
National team	Year	Apps	Goals
West Germany	1984	2	1
West Germany	1985	7	3
West Germany	1986	2	1
West Germany	1987	3	0
Total		14	5

== Honours ==
Borussia Mönchengladbach

- DFB-Pokal runner-up: 1983–84

1. FC Köln

- Bundesliga runner-up: 1988–89, 1989–90

West Germany

- FIFA World Cup runner-up: 1986

Individual

- Footballer of the Year (Germany): 1987
- Bundesliga top scorer: 1986–87
- kicker Bundesliga Team of the Season: 1986–87
