= Ulrich Sude =

German footballer and coach

Personal information
- Date of birth: 19 April 1956 (age 70)
- Place of birth: Korbach, Germany
- Position: Goalkeeper

Team information
- Current team: Borussia Mönchengladbach (youth scout)

Youth career
- SV Immighausen
- SV Korbach

Senior career*
Years	Team	Apps	(Gls)
1976–1987	Borussia Mönchengladbach	126	(0)

Managerial career
- 1991–1992: VfL Osnabrück
- 1992–1994: Borussia Fulda
- 1994–1995: FC Homburg
- 1995–1998: FC Homburg
- 1998–1999: 1. FC Saarbrücken
- 1999–2000: SC Verl
- 2001–2008: Borussia Mönchengladbach (youth team)
- 2008–: Borussia Mönchengladbach (youth team scout)
- * Club domestic league appearances and goals

Ulrich 'Uli' Sude (born 19 April 1956 in Korbach) is a German former soccer player who became a coach. He spent 11 seasons in the Bundesliga with Borussia Mönchengladbach.

== Honours ==
Borussia Mönchengladbach

- European Cup runner-up: 1977
- UEFA Cup: 1979
- UEFA Cup finalist: 1980
- Bundesliga: 1977; runner-up 1978
- DFB-Pokal runner-up: 1984
