= Michael Frontzeck =

German football player and coach (born 1964)

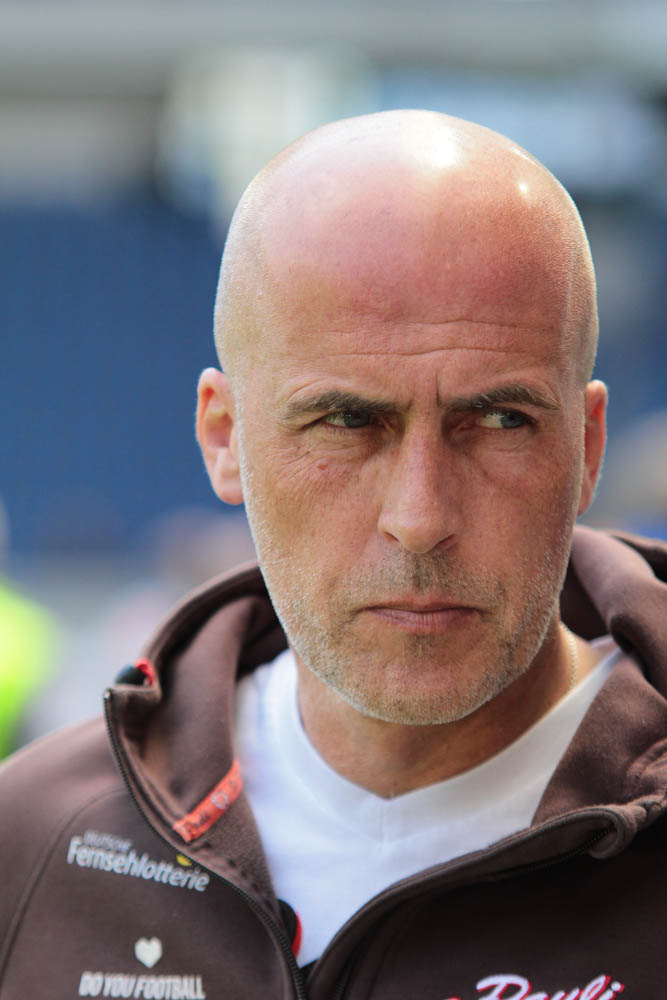
- Frontzeck in 2013

Personal information
- Date of birth: 26 March 1964 (age 62)
- Place of birth: Mönchengladbach, West Germany
- Height: 1.84 m (6 ft 0 in)
- Position: Left back

Youth career
- 1971–1979: SpVgg Odenkirchen
- 1979–1982: Borussia Mönchengladbach

Senior career*
Years	Team	Apps	(Gls)
1982–1989	Borussia Mönchengladbach	190	(17)
1989–1994	VfB Stuttgart	163	(16)
1994–1995	VfL Bochum	28	(2)
1995	Borussia Mönchengladbach	8	(0)
1995–1997	Manchester City	23	(0)
1997–1999	SC Freiburg	61	(3)
1999–2000	Borussia Mönchengladbach	40	(1)
Total		513	(39)

International career
1984–1986	West Germany U21	6	(0)
1984–1992	Germany	19	(0)

Managerial career
- 2006–2007: Alemannia Aachen
- 2008–2009: Arminia Bielefeld
- 2009–2011: Borussia Mönchengladbach
- 2012–2013: FC St. Pauli
- 2015: Hannover 96
- 2018: 1. FC Kaiserslautern
Medal record
Men's football
Representing Germany
UEFA European Championship
Runner-up	1992 Sweden
- * Club domestic league appearances and goals

Michael Frontzeck (born 26 March 1964) is a German professional football coach and former player who was most recently assistant coach of VfL Wolfsburg.

As a player he was a left back who notably played in the Bundesliga across three spells for Borussia Mönchengladbach. He also had a spell in the Premier League for Manchester City as well as playing for VfB Stuttgart, VfL Bochum and SC Freiburg He earned 19 caps for Germany and was in the squad at Euro 1992. As a manager Frontzeck has had spells in charge of Alemannia Aachen, Arminia Bielefeld, Borussia Mönchengladbach, FC St. Pauli, Hannover 96 and 1. FC Kaiserslautern.

== Playing career ==
Frontzeck began his career in the Bundesliga in 1982 with Borussia Mönchengladbach. From 1989 to 1994, he played for VfB Stuttgart as a left back. He returned to Borussia Mönchengladbach for the season 1995–96 but then had his first stay abroad in the 1996–97 season with Manchester City. After playing for SC Freiburg and a last season for Borussia Mönchengladbach, he ended his player career in May 2000.

He played for the Germany national team from 1984 to 1992 in a total of 19 games and won a runners-up medal in UEFA Euro 1992.

== Coaching career ==
Frontzeck started as assistant coach of Borussia Mönchengladbach from 2000 to 2003 and for Hannover 96 from 2004 to 2005. He was head coach of Alemannia Aachen from 13 September 2006 until the end of the season 2006–07 when he resigned due to the club's relegation. In January 2008, he was named head coach of Arminia Bielefeld and took over for interim head coach Detlev Dammeier after the winter break. Eventually, it was announced that his contract was extended until 2010 but on 17 May 2009, Frontzeck was fired.

=== Borussia Mönchengladbach ===
On 3 June 2009, Borussia Mönchengladbach announced Frontzeck's return to the team as new head coach. He signed a two-year contract until 30 June 2011. Following the loss against FC St. Pauli on 13 February 2011 Frontzeck was released as head coach by the club management of Borussia Mönchengladbach. He finished with a record of 16 wins, 14 draws, and 31 losses.

=== FC St. Pauli ===
On 3 October 2012, he was named new manager of FC St. Pauli replacing André Schubert. He was sacked on 6 November 2013. He finished with a record of 15 wins, 10 draws, and 5 losses.

=== Hannover 96 ===
He was appointed the new head coach of Hannover 96 on 20 April 2015. His first match was a 2–1 loss to 1899 Hoffenheim. To finish out the 2014–15 season, Hannover defeated FC Augsburg and SC Freiburg, both by a 2–1 scoreline, and two draws against VfL Wolfsburg and Werder Bremen. The win against Augsburg was Hannover's first win of 2015. On 28 May 2015, Hannover removed the interim tag and gave Frontzeck a two–year contract. He resigned on 21 December 2015. He finished with a record of seven wins, four draws, and 13 losses.

=== 1. FC Kaiserslautern ===
On 1 February 2018, Frontzeck was appointed the new manager of 1. FC Kaiserslautern, replacing Jeff Strasser. His first match was a 2–1 win against Eintracht Braunschweig on 4 February 2018. He was sacked on 1 December 2018.

=== VfL Wolfsburg ===
On 6 June 2021 Frontzeck joined VfL Wolfsburg as assistant to the newly appointed manager Mark van Bommel. When van Bommel was sacked in October 2021, Frontzeck was initially named interim coach of the club. However, this was never effected, since Florian Kohfeldt was announced as manager of the club just one day later. Frontzeck left the club in June 2022.

== Coaching record ==
As of 30 November 2018

Managerial record by team and tenure
Team	From	To	Record								Ref
Team	From	To	G	W	D	L	GF	GA	GD	Win %	Ref
Alemannia Aachen	13 September 2006	19 May 2007	34	10	7	17	51	72	−21	29.41	
Arminia Bielefeld	4 January 2008	17 May 2009	53	8	22	23	46	81	−35	15.09	
Borussia Mönchengladbach	3 June 2009	13 February 2011	61	16	14	31	81	122	−41	26.23	
FC St. Pauli	3 October 2012	6 November 2013	40	15	10	15	56	57	−1	37.50	
Hannover 96	20 April 2015	21 December 2015	24	7	4	13	29	38	−9	29.17	
1. FC Kaiserslautern	1 February 2018	1 December 2018	36	15	8	13	63	57	+6	41.67	
Total			248	71	65	112	326	427	−101	28.63	—

== Honours ==
Borussia M'gladbach

- DFB-Pokal runner-up: 1983–84

VfB Stuttgart

- Bundesliga: 1991–92
- DFL-Supercup: 1992

Germany

- UEFA European Football Championship runner-up: 1992
