= Benno Möhlmann =

German footballer and manager

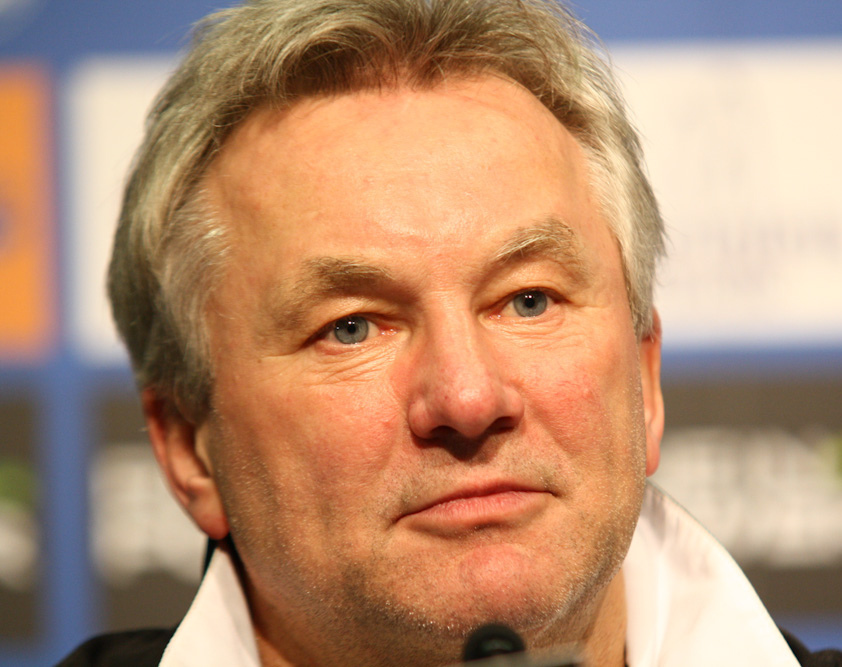
- Möhlmann in 2012

Personal information
- Full name: Benno Hans Möhlmann
- Date of birth: 1 August 1954 (age 72)
- Place of birth: Lohne, West Germany
- Height: 1.78 m (5 ft 10 in)
- Position: Midfielder

Youth career
- –1972: Blau-Weiß Lohne

Senior career*
Years	Team	Apps	(Gls)
1972–1978	Preußen Münster	199	(27)
1978–1987	Werder Bremen	230	(33)
1987–1989	Hamburger SV	25	(2)
Total		454	(62)

International career
1982	West Germany U21	1	(0)
1982	West Germany Olympic	1	(0)

Managerial career
- 1989–1990: Hamburger SV (assistant)
- 1992–1995: Hamburger SV
- 1995–1997: Eintracht Braunschweig
- 1997–2000: Greuther Fürth
- 2000–2004: Arminia Bielefeld
- 2004–2007: Greuther Fürth
- 2007–2008: Eintracht Braunschweig
- 2008–2009: Greuther Fürth
- 2010–2011: FC Ingolstadt
- 2011–2015: FSV Frankfurt
- 2015–2016: 1860 Munich
- 2016–2017: Preußen Münster
- * Club domestic league appearances and goals

Benno Hans Möhlmann (born 1 August 1954) is a German retired football player and manager. He played for Preußen Münster, Werder Bremen, and Hamburger SV.

== Playing career ==
Möhlmann began his senior career in 1972 as a midfielder with Preußen Münster in third tier Regionalliga. In 1978, he moved to Werder Bremen in the Bundesliga. He remained with Bremen until 1987 when he moved to Hamburger SV, finishing his playing career in 1989. In total, Möhlmann played in 255 Bundesliga matches, scoring 35 goals.

== Managerial career ==
Möhlmann's managing career started at Hamburger SV in 1992. From 1995 until 1997 Möhlmann was manager of Eintracht Braunschweig, then Möhlmann moved to Greuther Fürth, staying at that club until 2000. From 2000 until 2004, Möhlmann was manager of Arminia Bielefeld, winning promotion to 1. Bundesliga in 2002, but the team was immediately relegated the year after. Möhlmann was left in February 2004 and returned to Greuther Fürth. Möhlmann became manager of Eintracht Braunschweig in July 2007. After a string of unsatisfying performances by the team, Möhlmann stepped down as manager in May 2008. In July 2008, Möhlmann became for the third time the manager of Greuther Fürth, but he cancelled his contract on 20 December 2009. On 7 November 2010, Möhlmann was appointed manager of FC Ingolstadt. After almost exactly one year with Ingolstadt, Möhlmann was sacked as manager on 9 November 2011, after losing four of the five previous matches. Möhlmann became manager of FSV Frankfurt on 21 December 2011. He was sacked on 18 May 2015. His final match was a 3–1 loss to Union Berlin. On 6 October he was appointed as the head coach of 1860 Munich. He was sacked on 19 April 2016.

On 15 October 2016, he was appointed as the new head coach of Preußen Münster. He was sacked on 10 December 2017.

== Managerial statistics ==
As of 20 May 2017

Team	From	To	Record					
Team	From	To	G	W	D	L	Win %	Ref.
Hamburger SV	23 September 1992	5 October 1995	109	34	34	41	31.19	
Eintracht Braunschweig	22 October 1995	30 June 1997	59	39	9	11	66.10	
Greuther Fürth	15 October 1997	21 October 2000	108	40	39	29	37.04	
Arminia Bielefeld	23 October 2000	17 February 2004	119	43	33	43	36.13	
Greuther Fürth	17 February 2004	30 June 2007	122	57	25	40	46.72	
Eintracht Braunschweig	1 July 2007	12 May 2008	34	11	13	10	32.35	
Greuther Fürth	27 May 2008	20 December 2009	55	25	9	21	45.45	
FC Ingolstadt	7 November 2010	9 November 2011	39	13	12	14	33.33	
FSV Frankfurt	21 December 2011	18 May 2015	122	43	30	49	35.25	
1860 Munich	6 October 2015	19 April 2016	11	3	2	6	27.27	
Preußen Münster	15 October 2016	10 December 2017	34	16	5	13	47.06	
Total			801	321	209	271	40.07	—

== Honours ==
- Bundesliga runner-up: 1982–83, 1984–85 and 1985–86
- UEFA European Under-21 Football Championship runner-up: 1982
