= Bernd Martin =

German footballer

Personal information
- Date of birth: 10 February 1955
- Place of birth: Stuttgart, West Germany
- Date of death: 1 December 2018 (aged 63)
- Height: 1.80 m (5 ft 11 in)
- Position: Defender

Senior career*
Years	Team	Apps	(Gls)
1973–1982	VfB Stuttgart	219	(23)
1982–1985	FC Bayern Munich	16	(0)

International career
1978–1980	West Germany B	9	(2)
1979	West Germany	1	(0)
- * Club domestic league appearances and goals

Bernd Martin (10 February 1955, Stuttgart, West Germany – 1 December 2018) was a German footballer. He spent ten seasons in the Bundesliga with VfB Stuttgart and FC Bayern Munich and played one game (a UEFA Euro 1980 qualifier against Wales) for West Germany.

== Honours ==
- Bundesliga champion: 1984–85
- Bundesliga runner-up: 1978–79
- DFB-Pokal winner: 1983–84
- DFB-Pokal finalist: 1984–85
