= Walter Junghans =

German footballer

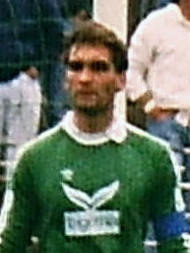
- Junghans playing for Schalke 04 in 1987

Personal information
- Date of birth: 26 October 1958 (age 68)
- Place of birth: Hamburg, West Germany
- Height: 1.85 m (6 ft 1 in)
- Position: Goalkeeper

Team information
- Current team: Bayern Munich II (goalkeeping scout)

Youth career
- –1977: Victoria Hamburg

Senior career*
Years	Team	Apps	(Gls)
1977–1982	Bayern Munich	67	(0)
1982–1987	Schalke 04	148	(0)
1987–1994	Hertha BSC	171	(0)
1994	Bayer Leverkusen	0	(0)
1994–1996	Fortuna Köln	30	(0)
Total		416	(0)

International career
1976–1977	West Germany U-18	18	(0)
1979–1981	West Germany B	6	(0)
1980	West Germany	0	(0)
1983–1984	West Germany Olympic	2	(0)

Managerial career
- 1997–1998: Fortuna Köln (goalkeeper coach)
- 1998–1999: 1. FC Köln (goalkeeping coach)
- 1999–2001: SL Benfica (goalkeeping coach)
- 2001–2005: Athletic Bilbao (goalkeeping coach)
- 2006–2007: Borussia Mönchengladbach (assistant)
- 2007–2010: Bayern Munich (goalkeeping coach)
- 2010–2021: Bayern Munich II (goalkeeping coach)
- 2010–2012: Bayern Munich U17 (goalkeeping coach)
- 2010–2017: Bayern Munich U19 (goalkeeping coach)
- 2011: Bayern Munich (goalkeeping coach)
- 2021–: Bayern Munich II (goalkeeping scout)
Medal record
Representing West Germany
UEFA European Championship
Winner	1980 Italy
- * Club domestic league appearances and goals

Walter Junghans (born 26 October 1958) is a German former professional footballer who played as a goalkeeper and currently works as a goalkeeping scout for German club Bayern Munich II.

== Playing career ==
Born in Hamburg, Junghans started his professional career with Bayern Munich in 1977, where he was the back up for Sepp Maier. In 1979, Maier had to end his career after a car accident. Junghans immediately enjoyed success and Bayern won the Bundesliga title in 1980 and 1981 with him between the posts. Bayern also won the DFB-Pokal and were European Cup runners-up in 1982, although Junghans did not play in the final. Junghans was part of the European Championship-winning 1980 Germany team, but as third choice goalkeeper he did not play in any of the games. In fact he would never get capped for Germany. Junghans left Bayern for Schalke after being demoted to second choice, spending four seasons in Gelsenkirchen. His next career stop was Berlin where he joined Hertha BSC, before eventually ending his playing career in 1996 for two seasons in the 2. Bundesliga with Fortuna Köln.

== Coaching career ==
In 2007, Junghans returned to Bayern Munich, where he again understudied Sepp Maier, this time as goalkeeper coach, before taking over upon Maier's retirement in 2008.

== Honours ==
Bayern Munich

- Bundesliga: 1979–80, 1980–81
- DFB-Pokal: 1981–82
- European Cup: runner-up 1981–82

Hertha BSC

- 2. Bundesliga: 1989–90; runner-up 1983–84

Germany

- European Championship: 1980
