= Wolfgang Grobe =

German footballer and coach

Personal information
- Date of birth: 25 June 1956 (age 70)
- Place of birth: Braunschweig, West Germany
- Height: 1.83 m (6 ft 0 in)
- Positions: Defender; midfielder

Team information
- Current team: FC Bayern Munich (scout)

Youth career
- MTV Braunschweig
- –1976: Eintracht Braunschweig

Senior career*
Years	Team	Apps	(Gls)
1976–1982	Eintracht Braunschweig	164	(30)
1982–1986	FC Bayern Munich	58	(10)
Total		222	(40)

Managerial career
- 1990–1991: Wolfenbütteler SV
- 1992: 1. FC Magdeburg
- * Club domestic league appearances and goals

Wolfgang Grobe (born 25 June 1956) is a German football coach and a former player. As of June 2011, he works as a scout for FC Bayern Munich. As a player, he spent nine seasons in the Bundesliga with Eintracht Braunschweig and FC Bayern Munich.

== Honours ==
- Bundesliga champion: 1984–85, 1985–86
- DFB-Pokal winner: 1983–84, 1985–86
