= Kai Erik Herlovsen =

Norwegian footballer and manager (born 1959)

Personal information
- Full name: Kai Erik Herlovsen
- Date of birth: 25 September 1959 (age 67)
- Place of birth: Fredrikstad, Norway
- Height: 1.79 m (5 ft 10 1/2 in)
- Position: Defender

Senior career*
Years	Team	Apps	(Gls)
1979–1982	Fredrikstad FK	65	(3)
1982–1989	Borussia Mönchengladbach	118	(3)
1986	Fredrikstad FK		
1989–1990	Fredrikstad FK		

International career
1982–1988	Norway	34	(0)
- * Club domestic league appearances and goals

Kai Erik Herlovsen (born 25 September 1959) is a Norwegian football coach and former player.

Herlovsen was usually used in the central defence or as a defensive midfielder. He was capped 34 times for Norway, and played in the 1984 Summer Olympics. On club level he began and ended his career in Fredrikstad, with a seven-year-long professional spell in Borussia Mönchengladbach in between.

He currently coaches Lisleby FK. His daughter Isabell Herlovsen is a current Norway international.
