= Wolfgang Dremmler =

German footballer (born 1954)

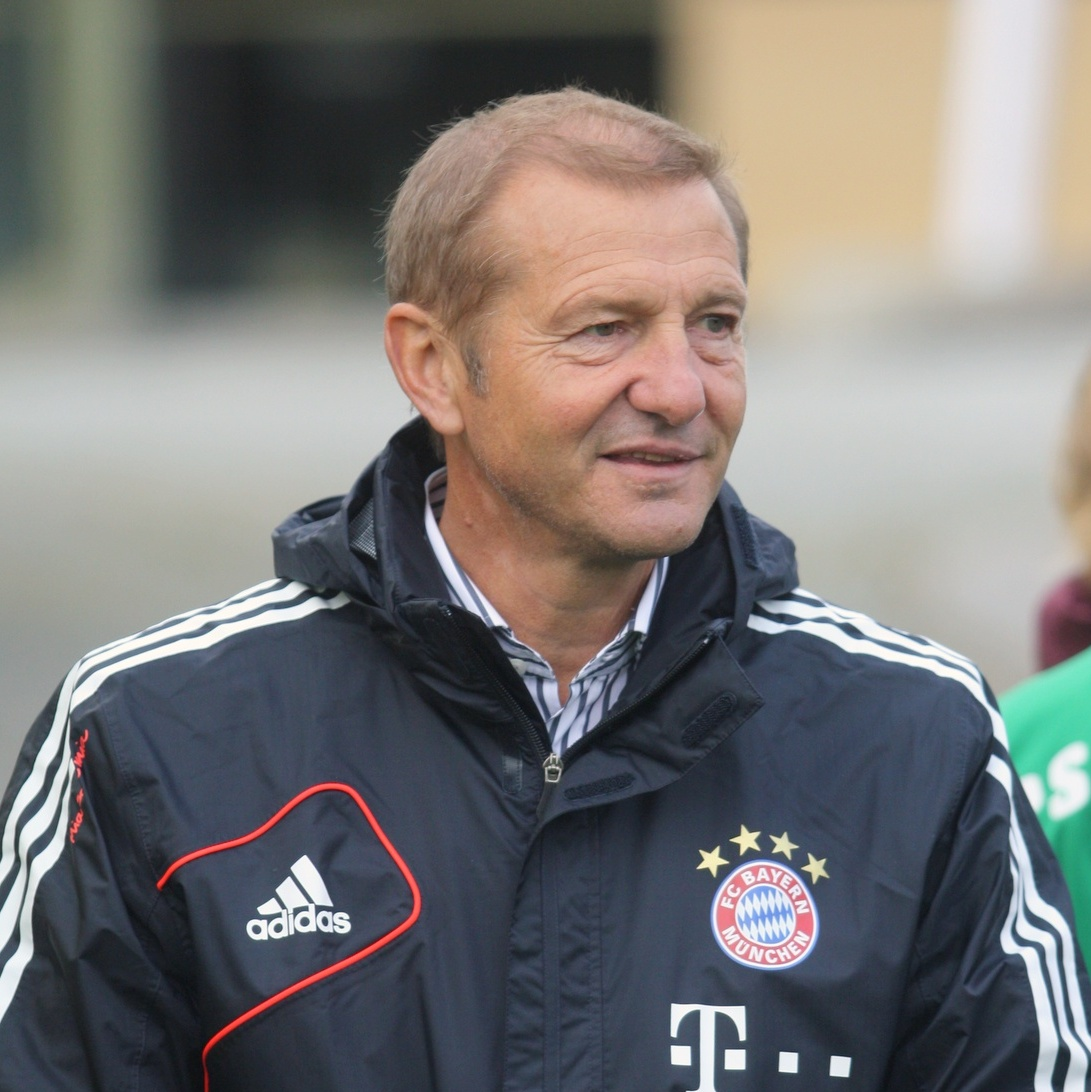
- Wolfgang Dremmler in Munich in 2012

Personal information
- Full name: Wolfgang Dremmler
- Date of birth: 12 July 1954 (age 72)
- Place of birth: Salzgitter, West Germany
- Height: 1.74 m (5 ft 8 1/2 in)
- Position: Defensive midfielder

Youth career
- 1961–1968: TSV Watenstedt
- 1968–1970: TSV Hallendorf
- 1970–1973: Union Salzgitter

Senior career*
Years	Team	Apps	(Gls)
1973–1979	Eintracht Braunschweig	138	(9)
1979–1986	FC Bayern Munich	172	(6)
Total		310	(15)

International career
1975–1981	West Germany B	3	(0)
1981–1984	West Germany	27	(3)
- * Club domestic league appearances and goals

Wolfgang Dremmler (born 12 July 1954) is a German former footballer who played as a midfielder.

A trained metalworker, Dremmler was part of the West Germany team that reached the 1982 FIFA World Cup final against Italy at Santiago Bernabéu. Altogether, he played in 310 Bundesliga matches (15 goals) for Eintracht Braunschweig and FC Bayern Munich, the club he joined in 1979 at the recommendation of Paul Breitner to win four Bundesliga and three German Cup trophies until his retirement due to a knee-injury in 1986. For West Germany he debuted on 7 January 1981 in a game against Brazil. In total he won 27 caps (three goals) for his country.

Dremmler retired from coaching in football at the end of the 2016–17 season. Dremmler's last job was the director of Bayern's youth development center.

== Honours ==
=== Club ===
Bayern Munich

- Bundesliga: 1979–80, 1980–81, 1984–85, 1985–86
- DFB-Pokal: 1981–82, 1983–84, 1985–86; runner-up: 1984–85
- European Cup runner-up: 1981–82

=== International ===
West Germany

- FIFA World Cup runner-up: 1982
