= Dieter Hoeneß =

German football player and executive

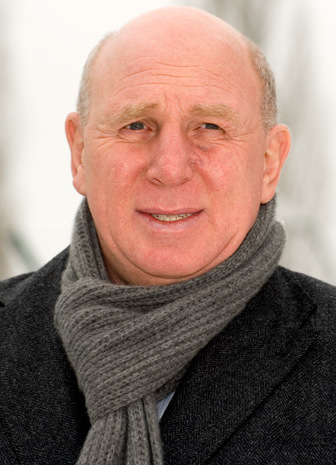
- Hoeneß in 2009

Personal information
- Full name: Dieter Hoeneß
- Date of birth: 7 January 1953 (age 73)
- Place of birth: Ulm, West Germany
- Height: 1.88 m (6 ft 2 in)
- Position: Forward

Youth career
- 1959–1967: VfB Ulm
- 1967–1971: Ulm 1846

Senior career*
Years	Team	Apps	(Gls)
1971–1973	Ulm 1846		
1973–1975	VfR Aalen	103	(46)
1975–1979	VfB Stuttgart	105	(44)
1979–1987	Bayern Munich	224	(102)
Total		432	(192)

International career
1979	West Germany B	2	(2)
1979–1986	West Germany	6	(4)
- * Club domestic league appearances and goals

Dieter Hoeneß (born 7 January 1953) is a German former professional football player and executive. A forward during his playing career, Hoeneß was primarily associated with Bayern Munich. After retiring, he remained involved in football, working extensively in executive roles for several clubs. Hoeneß represented the West Germany national football team at the 1986 World Cup.

== Club career ==
Born on 7 January 1953, in Ulm, West Germany, Hoeneß played as a goalkeeper at amateur level for VfB Ulm from the age of six to fourteen. The club was co-founded by his father, master butcher Erwin Hoeneß, on 13 November 1949. Along with his brother Uli, he helped the team win the 1960–61 1st district championship in the D-Youth category. From 1967 to 1973, Hoeneß played for TSG Ulm 1846. In 1973, at the age of 20, he moved to VfR Aalen in the first amateur league (third division), before joining the professional ranks in 1975 with VfB Stuttgart, which was then in the second division.

In his first season with Aalen, Hoeneß helped win the championship, scoring 23 goals, the second highest for the team behind Helmut Dietterle. However, due to a league reform that replaced the five-track Regionalliga with the two-track 2. Bundesliga as the second-highest division, VfR Aalen was unable to be promoted and remained in the third division the following season. There, Hoeneß and his team again won the championship but failed in the promotion games.

In 1975, Hoeneß was signed by the second-division club VfB Stuttgart, making his debut on 13 September 1975 (Matchday 7) in a 0–2 home defeat against 1. FSV Mainz 05. He scored his first goal on 15 October (matchday 11) in a 2–0 home win over SV Röchling Völklingen. After two seasons and 19 league goals, he helped Stuttgart earn promotion to the Bundesliga. Hoeneß made his Bundesliga debut on 6 August 1977 (Matchday 1) in a tense 3–3 draw against his future club, FC Bayern Munich. He scored his first Bundesliga goal on 31 August (Matchday 5) in a 1–2 home defeat against Hamburger SV, netting the interim equalizer for 1–1.

After the 1978–79 season, during which he scored 16 goals to help Stuttgart finish in second place, Hoeneß signed with FC Bayern Munich. He found great success both individually and collectively at Bayern, winning five league titles and three cups. A powerful striker known for his heading ability, he scored in double digits in five seasons during his time with the Bavarians, totaling 127 goals in 288 league matches in the German top division alone. He retired in 1987 at the age of 34, having scored 102 goals in 224 Bundesliga games. He also scored in every second European Cup game, netting 26 goals in 52 appearances for Bayern Munich.

Hoeneß led Bayern to the semi-finals of the 1979–80 UEFA Cup, finishing as the competition's top scorer with seven goals. In 1982, he reached the European Cup final but lost to Aston Villa. He again finished as the tournament's top scorer, with seven goals. During his time in Munich, Hoeneß became known for his goal-scoring ability, especially with headers, and earned a reputation as a fierce competitor. This reputation was reinforced during the 1982 DFB-Pokal Final when, after a collision with 1. FC Nürnberg player Alois Reinhard, he played on with a head injury. Despite wearing a turban-like bandage, he continued for nearly an hour and eventually scored the 4–2 goal with a header in the 89th minute.

On 25 February 1984, Hoeneß scored five goals in 21 minutes during a 6–0 home win over Eintracht Braunschweig. His 58th and final European match came in his last season (1986–87) during the defeat in the European Cup Final against FC Porto.

== International career ==
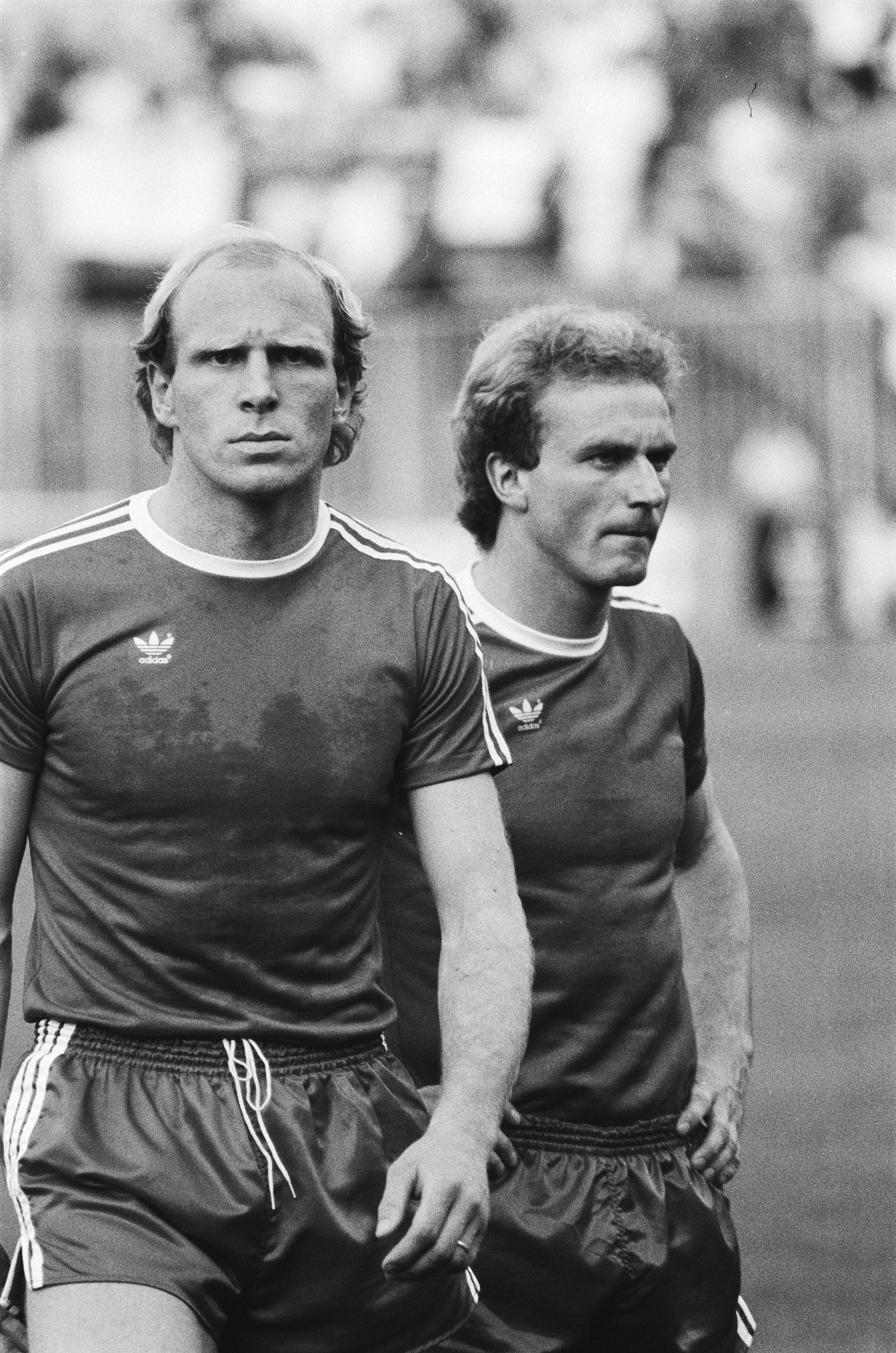
Hoeneß (left) in a match in 1982

On 28 March 1979, Hoeneß played his first international match for the B national team, which defeated the senior national team of Norway 3–0 in Aachen. He contributed a goal in the match. In his second game for this team, on 19 December 1979 in Genoa, he scored again, helping secure a 2–1 victory over the B selection of Italy.

Hoeneß played six times for the West Germany, scoring four goals. He scored on his debut against the Republic of Ireland on 22 May 1979 and repeated the feat the following month against the Iceland (both matches were away friendlies that ended in 3-1 wins).

Hoeneß then spent seven years without a call-up. However, after a strong 1985–86 season with Bayern—scoring 15 league goals and winning the double—he was selected for the squad that competed in the 1986 FIFA World Cup in Mexico. He played twice for the eventual runners-up, including in the final against Argentina, where he replaced Felix Magath at the hour mark. At 33 years and 173 days, he was the oldest player on the field in that match. Hoeneß was called up by team boss Franz Beckenbauer for a game against the Switzerland in Basel on 9 April 1986, where he scored the "golden" goal. In the subsequent 1–1 draw with the Yugoslavia on 11 May in Bochum, he failed to score for the first time in an international match.

== Post-retirement ==
After retiring from active play, Hoeneß initially took on a position as PR manager with computer manufacturer Commodore International, which was a major sponsor of Bayern Munich at the time. In October, he assumed a new role as head of sports marketing at the company, which then dominated the German market for home computers. He was responsible for the expiration of the sponsorship agreement with Bayern Munich in 1989 and, due to a strategic shift by the company, focused on other sports such as equestrianism, golf, tennis, and alpine skiing as well as event marketing. Between 1990 and 1995, he worked as the commercial/general manager for his former club, Stuttgart. This was part of a professionalization strategy that included Daimler board spokesman Matthias Kleinert as a member of the VfB executive committee.

The Swabian club won the league title in the 1991–92 season, but missed out on further success the following season due to a "mistake"—coach Christoph Daum used four foreign players without justification after Jovica Simanić was substituted on during the second leg at Leeds United. This resulted in a 1–2 defeat in a decider at Camp Nou during the first round of the UEFA Champions League, causing them to miss the group stage of the inaugural European Cup. In subsequent years, the club struggled to build on its earlier success. By the spring of 1995, Hoeneß, in his role as sporting director, faced criticism. His use of Anglo-Saxon terms like "event", "marketing", and "merchandising" was seen as a poor fit with the traditional, down-to-earth values of Swabian culture, and he was accused of arriving late to work in the mornings. Hoeneß was eventually replaced by his predecessor, managing director Ulrich Schäfer, who had served from 1976 to 1990 and resumed control of the club's operations.

In November 1995, Michael A. Roth, the president of 1. FC Nürnberg, campaigned vigorously for Hoeneß's commitment but was unable to secure his position at the club, as Hoeneß accepted an offer to become the general manager of a television company. In April 1997, Hoeneß ended his association with the television company and subsequently became vice-president of another Bundesliga club, Hertha BSC, after serving as a temporary replacement for the dismissed Carl-Heinz Rühl since March. Following the club's promotion to the Bundesliga in the summer of that year, the team established itself in the top flight and qualified for international cup competitions seven times in twelve seasons under Hoeneß's leadership. The team finished in the top six of the league on eight occasions during this period. Shortly thereafter, he transitioned to the role of commercial/general manager and was released on 7 June 2009. He departed on 7 June 2009 at his own request, one year before the end of his contract, due to disagreements over his management style.

On 21 December 2009, Hoeneß was announced as the new general manager at VfL Wolfsburg, officially taking office on 15 January 2010. After Felix Magath's return to the club, his contract was terminated on 17 March 2011.

== Personal life ==
Hoeneß attended the Schubart Gymnasium in Ulm, where he earned his Abitur in 1972. In Tübingen, he began studying to become a teacher in the subjects of English, geography, and sports. As a city sponsor of his hometown of Ulm, Hoeneß supported the social project We Help Africa for the 2010 FIFA World Cup in South Africa. He is also an ambassador for the initiative Respect! No place for racism. After his career as a Bundesliga manager, Hoeneß returned to Munich, where he founded a consulting company in 2012.

Hoeneß's older brother, Uli, was also a successful forward in the Bundesliga and represented his country internationally. Dieter arrived at Bayern Munich as his brother departed, and Uli went on to have a lengthy career as a general manager and club president. Both enjoy playing golf in their leisure time. Dieter's son, Sebastian Hoeneß, is a former footballer and current manager. He played for the U19 teams of VfB Stuttgart, TSG 1899 Hoffenheim, and the second team of Hertha BSC, among others. In Berlin, Sebastian captained the U-23 team. From June 2019, after several positions as a youth coach, he served as head coach of the newly promoted third division team FC Bayern Munich II, with whom he immediately won the third division championship. From July 2020 until the end of the 2021/22 season, he was head coach of TSG 1899 Hoffenheim in the Bundesliga.

== Honours ==
As a player Bayern Munich

- Bundesliga: 1979–80, 1980–81, 1984–85, 1985–86, 1986–87
- DFB-Pokal: 1981–82, 1983–84, 1985–86; runner-up 1984–85
- European Cup: runner-up 1981–82, 1986–87

Individual

- Top scorer of the DFB-Pokal: 1979
- Top scorer of the UEFA Cup: 1980
- Top scorer of the European Cup: 1982

Germany

- FIFA World Cup: runner-up 1986

As a manager

- Bundesliga: 1991–92
- DFB-Supercup: 1992
- DFB-Ligapokal: 2001, 2002
