= 1979–80 FC Bayern Munich season =

15th season of Bayern Munich in the Bundesliga

Bayern Munich
1979–80 season
- Chairman: Wilhelm Neudecker; Willi O. Hoffmann
- Manager: Pál Csernai
- Bundesliga: 1st
- DFB-Pokal: Third round
- UEFA Cup: Semi-finals
- Top goalscorer: League: Karl-Heinz Rummenigge (26); All: Karl-Heinz Rummenigge (36)

The 1979–80 FC Bayern Munich season was the club's 15th season in the Bundesliga.

== Review and events ==
Bayern Munich won the Bundesliga by two points over Hamburger SV. They lost in the third round of the DFB-Pokal and semi-finals of the UEFA Cup.

== Match results ==
=== Legend ===
Win Draw Loss

=== Bundesliga ===
11 August 1979 1	Bayern Munich	3–1	Bayer 04 Leverkusen	Munich
15:30 CET	Dürnberger 3'; Rummenigge 12'; Janzon 59'	Report	Demuth 62' (pen.); Posner (yellow card)	Stadium: Olympic Stadium; Attendance: 33,000; Referee: Gert Meuser

18 August 1979 2	FC Schalke 04	1–1	Bayern Munich	Gelsenkirchen
15:30 CET	Dzoni 73' (pen.); Thiele (yellow card)	Report	Rummenigge 9'; Dremmler (yellow card)	Stadium: Parkstadion; Attendance: 68,000; Referee: Günter Linn

28 August 1979 3	Bayern Munich	1–1	Hamburger SV	Munich
20:00 CET	Augenthaler 61'	Report	Kaltz 81'; Nogly (yellow card)	Stadium: Olympic Stadium; Attendance: 77,850; Referee: Wolf-Dieter Ahlenfelder

5 September 1979 4	Borussia Mönchengladbach	2–1	Bayern Munich	Mönchengladbach
20:00 CET	Gores 22'; Nickel 42'	Report	Dürnberger 58'	Stadium: Bökelbergstadion; Attendance: 32,000; Referee: Jan Redelfs

8 September 1979 5	VfL Bochum	0–1	Bayern Munich	Bochum
15:30 CET		Report	Rummenigge 40'	Stadium: Stadion an der Castroper Straße; Attendance: 33,000; Referee: Walter Horstmann

15 September 1979 6	Bayern Munich	1–1	Hertha BSC	Munich
15:30 CET	Hoeneß 65'	Report	Gersdorff 88'	Stadium: Olympic Stadium; Attendance: 28,000; Referee: Gerd Hennig

22 September 1979 7	MSV Duisburg	1–2	Bayern Munich	Duisburg
15:30 CET	Jara 2' (yellow card); Mirnegg (yellow card)	Report	Rummenigge 76'; Breitner 89'; Janzon (yellow card)	Stadium: Wedaustadion; Attendance: 30,000; Referee: Franz-Josef Hontheim

6 October 1979 8	Bayern Munich	2–0	1. FC Kaiserslautern	Munich
15:30 CET	Niedermayer 38', 82'	Report	Bongartz (yellow card)	Stadium: Olympic Stadium; Attendance: 64,500; Referee: Rainer Waltert

20 October 1979 9	Eintracht Frankfurt	3–2	Bayern Munich	Frankfurt
15:30 CET	Körbel 67'; Nickel 70'; Karger 78'; Grabowski (yellow card)	Report	Horsmann 18'; Rummenigge 61'	Stadium: Waldstadion; Attendance: 60,000; Referee: Horst Joos

27 October 1979 10	Bayern Munich	1–2	1. FC Köln	Munich
15:30 CET	Hoeneß 60'	Report	D.Müller 53'; Schuster 89'; Engels (yellow card); Cullmann (yellow card)	Stadium: Olympic Stadium; Attendance: 33,000; Referee: Walter Engel

3 November 1979 11	Werder Bremen	1–4	Bayern Munich	Bremen
15:30 CET	Dreßel 53'	Report	Hoeneß 31', 64'; Rummenigge 44'; Niedermayer 80'	Stadium: Weserstadion; Attendance: 26,000; Referee: Helmut Treib

10 November 1979 12	Bayern Munich	3–0	F.C. Bayer 05 Uerdingen	Munich
15:30 CET	Rummenigge 51'; Hoeneß 66'; Niedermayer 79'; Breitner (yellow card); Dremmler (yellow card)	Report		Stadium: Olympic Stadium; Attendance: 15,000; Referee: Jürgen Messmer

17 November 1979 13	1860 Munich	1–2	Bayern Munich	Munich
15:30 CET	Flohe 65'	Report	Dürnberger 32'; Hoeneß 78'	Stadium: Olympic Stadium; Attendance: 78,000; Referee: Wolf-Dieter Ahlenfelder

24 November 1979 14	Bayern Munich	4–2	Borussia Dortmund	Munich
15:30 CET	Niedermayer 3'; Augenthaler 9'; Rummenigge 33'; Breitner 65' (pen.)	Report	Huber 38' (pen.) (yellow card); Burgsmüller 32'; Meyer (yellow card)	Stadium: Olympic Stadium; Attendance: 44,000; Referee: Heinz Quindeau

1 December 1979 15	Fortuna Düsseldorf	0–3	Bayern Munich	Düsseldorf
15:30 CET	Bruns (penalty missed) 35'; Baltes (yellow card)	Report	Janzon 23'; Rummenigge 25', 65'; Breitner (yellow card); Hoeneß (yellow card)	Stadium: Rheinstadion; Attendance: 40,000; Referee: Walter Niemann

8 December 1979 16	Bayern Munich	4–0	VfB Stuttgart	Munich
15:30 CET	Rummenigge 10'; Hoeneß 12'; Breitner 28', 75'	Report	Hattenberger (yellow card)	Stadium: Olympic Stadium; Attendance: 66,000; Referee: Medardus Luca

15 December 1979 17	Eintracht Braunschweig	1–1	Bayern Munich	Braunschweig
15:30 CET	Borg 46'; Grobe (yellow card)	Report	Janzon 63'; Dremmler (yellow card)	Stadium: Eintracht-Stadion; Attendance: 29,000; Referee: Günther Risse

19 January 1980 18	Bayer 04 Leverkusen	1–0	Bayern Munich	Leverkusen
15:30 CET	Demuth 60' (pen.)	Report	Breitner (yellow card); Weiner (yellow card)	Stadium: Ulrich-Haberland-Stadion; Attendance: 20,000; Referee: Wilfried Brückner

26 January 1980 19	Bayern Munich	3–1	FC Schalke 04	Munich
15:30 CET	Kraus 56'; Rummenigge 67'; Niedermayer 83'	Report	Rüssmann 80' (pen.); Bittcher (yellow card)	Stadium: Olympic Stadium; Attendance: 18,000; Referee: Jan Redelfs

2 February 1980 20	Hamburger SV	3–1	Bayern Munich	Hamburg
15:30 CET	Hartwig 60'; Augenthaler 76' (o.g.); Hrubesch 89'	Report	Janzon 86'; Breitner (yellow card)	Stadium: Volksparkstadion; Attendance: 61,000; Referee: Günter Linn

9 February 1980 21	Bayern Munich	3–1	Borussia Mönchengladbach	Munich
15:30 CET	Hoeneß 17'; Weiner 18'; Augenthaler (penalty missed) 57'; Rummenigge 64' (yellow card); Kraus (yellow card)	Report	Schäfer 35'; Matthäus (yellow card)	Stadium: Olympic Stadium; Attendance: 28,000; Referee: Franz-Josef Hontheim

23 February 1980 22	Bayern Munich	3–0	VfL Bochum	Munich
15:30 CET	Horsmann 7'; Rummenigge 16'; Aas 80'	Report		Stadium: Olympic Stadium; Attendance: 16,000; Referee: Peter Gabor

1 March 1980 23	Hertha BSC	1–1	Bayern Munich	Berlin
15:30 CET	Remark 83'; Krämer (yellow card); Brück (yellow card)	Report	Janzon 7'; Kraus (yellow card)	Stadium: Olympic Stadium; Attendance: 20,000; Referee: Günther Risse

8 March 1980 24	Bayern Munich	3–1	MSV Duisburg	Munich
15:30 CET	Hoeneß 22'; Rummenigge 67', 78' (yellow card)	Report	Seliger 53'; Kempe (yellow card); Grillemeier (yellow card)	Stadium: Olympic Stadium; Attendance: 21,000; Referee: Walter Niemann

15 March 1980 25	1. FC Kaiserslautern	1–1	Bayern Munich	Kaiserslautern
15:30 CET	Geye 60'; Groh (yellow card)	Report	Rummenigge 35'; Augenthaler (yellow card); Oblak (yellow card)	Stadium: Betzenbergstadion; Attendance: 35,000; Referee: Werner Burgers

22 March 1980 26	Bayern Munich	2–0	Eintracht Frankfurt	Munich
15:30 CET	Horsmann 45'; Lorant 32' (o.g.)	Report	Lorant (yellow card)	Stadium: Olympic Stadium; Attendance: 36,000; Referee: Gerd Hennig

29 March 1980 27	1. FC Köln	2–4	Bayern Munich	Cologne
15:30 CET	D.Müller 56'; Zimmermann 70'	Report	Hoeneß 26', 58'; Breitner 85' (yellow card); Oblak 90' (yellow card)	Stadium: Müngersdorfer Stadion; Attendance: 60,000; Referee: Medardus Luca

12 April 1980 28	Bayern Munich	7–0	Werder Bremen	Munich
15:30 CET	Breitner 27' (pen.), 65'; Hoeneß 39', 88'; Janzon 53'; Rummenigge 57', 62'	Report		Stadium: Olympic Stadium; Attendance: 21,000; Referee: Karl-Josef Assenmacher

19 April 1980 29	Bayer 05 Uerdingen	1–3	Bayern Munich	Krefeld
15:30 CET	Raschid 17'	Report	Rummenigge 10'; Niedermayer 13'; Hoeneß 69'	Stadium: Grotenburg-Stadion; Attendance: 18,000; Referee: Volker Roth

10 May 1980 30	Bayern Munich	6–1	1860 Munich	Munich
15:30 CET	Janzon 6'; Breitner 16', 79' (penalty missed) 16'; Niedermayer 20'; Rummenigge 31', 59'	Report	Bitz 43'	Stadium: Olympic Stadium; Attendance: 77,500; Referee: Heinz Aldinger

3 May 1980 31	Borussia Dortmund	1–0	Bayern Munich	Dortmund
15:30 CET	M. Votava 21'	Report	Augenthaler (yellow card)	Stadium: Westfalenstadion; Attendance: 53,872; Referee: Walter Engel

17 May 1980 32	Bayern Munich	6–0	Fortuna Düsseldorf	Munich
15:30 CET	Niedermayer 24', 50'; Rummenigge 31', 66', 78'; Hoeneß 74'	Report		Stadium: Olympic Stadium; Attendance: 31,000; Referee: Walter Horstmann

24 May 1980 33	VfB Stuttgart	1–3	Bayern Munich	Stuttgart
15:30 CET	Volkert 84' (pen.); Holcer (yellow card); Förster (yellow card)	Report	Horsmann 45', 61', (yellow card); Hoeneß 86'	Stadium: Neckarstadion; Attendance: 71,000; Referee: Jürgen Messmer

31 May 1980 34	Bayern Munich	2–1	Eintracht Braunschweig	Munich
15:30 CET	Breitner 6' (pen.); Rummenigge 52'	Report	Worm 88'	Stadium: Olympic Stadium; Attendance: 70,000; Referee: Wolf-Dieter Ahlenfelder

=== DFB-Pokal ===
25 August 1979 1st Round	FC Östringen	1–10	Bayern Munich	Östringen
CET	Pfleger 36'; Hoffmann (yellow card); Förderer (yellow card)	Report	Rummenigge 3', 5', 57', 72'; Breitner 10', 34'; Niedermayer 24'; Janzon 42', 54', 59'	Stadium: Josef-Küne-Waldstadion; Attendance: 11,000; Referee: Horst Joos

29 September 1979 2nd Round	Viktoria Köln	1–3	Bayern Munich	Köln
CET	Ochmann 62'; Mall (yellow card)	Report	Rummenigge 6'; D.Hoeneß 58'; Dremmler 84'	Stadium: Sportpark Höhenberg; Attendance: 9,200; Referee: Manfred Wichmann

12 January 1980 3rd Round	SpVgg Bayreuth	1–0	Bayern Munich	Bayreuth
CET	Sommerer 22'; Brand (yellow card)	Report	Rummenigge (yellow card)	Stadium: Hans-Walter-Wild-Stadion; Attendance: 18,000; Referee: Robert Walz

=== UEFA Cup ===
==== First round ====
19 September 1979 First leg	FC Bohemians Praha (Czech Republic)	0–2	(West Germany) Bayern Munich	Prague
17:00 CET		Report	Kraus 24'; Rummenigge 72'	Stadium: Ďolíček; Attendance: 31,000; Referee: Michel Vautrot (France)

3 October 1979 Second leg	Bayern Munich (West Germany)	2–2 (4–2 agg.)	(Czech Republic) FC Bohemians Praha	Munich
20:00 CET	Rummenigge 55'; Breitner 85' (pen.)	Report	Ondra 83'; Prokeš 86'; Nemec (yellow card) 75'	Stadium: Olympiastadion; Attendance: 15,000; Referee: Yordan Zhezhov (Bulgaria)

==== Second round ====
24 November 1979 First leg	Aarhus GF (Denmark)	1–2	(West Germany) Bayern Munich	Aarhus
19:30 CET	Sanders 83'	Report	Rummenigge 43', 47'	Stadium: Århus Idrætspark; Attendance: 23,000; Referee: Eamonn Farrell (Ireland)

7 November 1979 Second leg	Bayern Munich (West Germany)	3–1 (2–5 agg.)	(Denmark) Aarhus GF	Munich
20:00 CET	D. Hoeneß 28', 89'; Breitner 85'	Report	Mikkelsen 38'	Stadium: Olympiastadion; Attendance: 3,000; Referee: Francisc Coloşi (Rumania)

==== Round of 16 ====
28 November 1979 First leg	Bayern Munich (West Germany)	2–0	(Socialist Federal Republic of Yugoslavia) Red Star Belgrade	Munich
20:00 CET	Rummenigge 51'; Kraus 69'	Report	Blagojević (yellow card); Šestić (yellow card)	Stadium: Olympiastadion; Attendance: 38,000; Referee: Paolo Casarin (Italy)

12 December 1979 Second leg	Red Star Belgrade (Socialist Federal Republic of Yugoslavia)	3–2 (3–4 agg.)	(West Germany) Bayern Munich	Belgrade
16:00 CET	Savić 3' (yellow card) 4'; Petrović 41'; Repčić 49'; Šestić (yellow card) 62'	Report	D. Hoeneß 65', 68'	Stadium: Stadion Rajko Mitić; Attendance: 95,000; Referee: Hilmi Ok (Turkey)

==== Quarterfinals ====
5 March 1980 First Leg	1. FC Kaiserslautern (West Germany)	1–0	(West Germany) Bayern Munich	Kaiserslautern
CET	Brummer 57'	Report		Stadium: Betzenbergstadion; Attendance: 34,000; Referee: Dušan Krchňák (Czech Republic)

19 March 1980 Second leg	Bayern Munich (West Germany)	4–1 (2–4 agg.)	(West Germany) 1. FC Kaiserslautern	Munich
CET	D. Hoeneß 35', 82'; Janzon 60'; Breitner 73' (pen.)	Report	Wendt 12'	Stadium: Olympiastadion; Attendance: 30,000; Referee: Nikola Dudin (Bulgaria)

==== Semifinals ====
9 April 1980 First leg	Bayern Munich (West Germany)	2–0	(West Germany) Eintracht Frankfurt	Munich
CET	D. Hoeneß 50'; Breitner 76' (pen.)	Report		Stadium: Olympiastadion; Attendance: 14,000; Referee: László Pádár (Hungary)

22 April 1980 Second Leg	Eintracht Frankfurt (West Germany)	5–1 (a.e.t.) (5–3 agg.)	(West Germany) Bayern Munich	Frankfurt
CET	Pezzey 31', 87'; Karger 103', 107'; Lorant 118' (pen.)	Report	Dremmler 105'	Stadium: Waldstadion; Attendance: 50,000; Referee: Brian McGinlay (Scotland)
