= 1978–79 FC Bayern Munich season =

14th season of Bayern Munich in the Bundesliga

Bayern Munich
1978–79 season
- Chairman: Wilhelm Neudecker
- Manager: Gyula Lóránt; Pál Csernai
- Bundesliga: 4th
- DFB-Pokal: Second round
- Top goalscorer: League: Karl-Heinz Rummenigge (14); All: Karl-Heinz Rummenigge (14)

The 1978–79 FC Bayern Munich season was the club's 14th season in Bundesliga.

They finished fourth in the Bundesliga with 16 wins, 8 draws, and 10 losses.

== Competitions ==
Win Draw Loss

=== Bundesliga ===
12 August 1978 1	Borussia Dortmund	1–0	Bayern Munich	Dortmund
15:30 CET	Burgsmüller 32'; Votava (yellow card)	Report	Rausch (yellow card)	Stadium: Westfalenstadion; Attendance: 46,402; Referee: Günter Linn

19 August 1978 2	Bayern Munich	6–2	MSV Duisburg	Munich
15:30 CET	Müller 2', 84' (yellow card); Breitner 12'; Augenthaler 21'; Rummenigge 40'; Niedermayer 62'	Report	Büsser 8'; Jara 49'	Stadium: Olympic Stadium; Attendance: 32,000; Referee: Heinz Quindeau

26 August 1978 3	FC Schalke 04	2–1	Bayern Munich	Gelsenkirchen
15:30 CET	Rüssmann 42'; Fischer 52'	Report	Horsmann 81'; Rummenigge (yellow card); Rausch (yellow card)	Stadium: Parkstadion; Attendance: 62,000; Referee: Jan Redelfs

2 September 1978 4	Bayern Munich	3–1	Eintracht Frankfurt	Munich
15:30 CET	Dürnberger 5'; Müller 19'; Rummenigge 29'	Report	Neuberger 44'; Lorant (yellow card)	Stadium: Olympic Stadium; Attendance: 25,000; Referee: Günther Risse

9 September 1978 5	Arminia Bielefeld	0–2	Bayern Munich	Bielefeld
15:30 CET	Pohl (yellow card)	Report	Janzon 37'; Müller 84'; Dürnberger (yellow card); Kappellmann (yellow card); Schwarzenbeck (yellow card)	Stadium: Bielefelder Alm; Attendance: 35,000; Referee: Walter Niemann

16 September 1978 6	Bayern Munich	6–1	Eintracht Braunschweig	Munich
15:30 CET	Breitner 9', 82'; Rummenigge 24', 54'; Niedermayer 34'; Müller 40'	Report	Nickel 74'	Stadium: Olympic Stadium; Attendance: 37,000; Referee: Rainer Waltert

30 September 1978 7	Bayern Munich	3–1	Borussia Mönchengladbach	Munich
15:30 CET	Müller 9' (penalty missed) 37'; Dürnberger 65'; Breitner 90' (pen.)	Report	Simonsen 41'; Lausen (yellow card); Gores (yellow card)	Stadium: Olympic Stadium; Attendance: 76,000; Referee: Gerd Meuser

7 October 1978 8	Werder Bremen	1–1	Bayern Munich	Bremen
15:30 CET	Hiller 18'; Röntved (yellow card)	Report	Rausch 65'; Müller (penalty missed) 68'; Niedermayer (yellow card); Breitner (yellow card)	Stadium: Weserstadion; Attendance: 30,000; Referee: Karl-Josef Assenmacher

14 October 1978 9	Bayern Munich	2–1	VfL Bochum	Munich
15:30 CET	Dürnberger 21'; Horsmann 88'	Report	Eggert 15'; Versen (yellow card)	Stadium: Olympic Stadium; Attendance: 29,000; Referee: Wilfried Heitmann

21 October 1978 10	VfB Stuttgart	2–0	Bayern Munich	Stuttgart
15:30 CET	Hoeneß 55'; Kelsch 60'	Report	Schwarzenbeck (yellow card); Oblak (yellow card)	Stadium: Neckarstadion; Attendance: 71,000; Referee: Wolf-Dieter Ahlenfelder

28 October 1978 11	Bayern Munich	1–1	Hertha BSC	Munich
15:30 CET	Müller 54'	Report	Gersdorff 51'	Stadium: Olympic Stadium; Attendance: 25,000; Referee: Werner Burgers

4 November 1978 12	1. FC Köln	1–1	Bayern Munich	Cologne
15:30 CET	D.Müller 61'; Cullmann (yellow card)	Report	Müller 72'; Augenthaler (yellow card); Rausch (yellow card)	Stadium: Müngersdorfer Stadion; Attendance: 60,000; Referee: Walter Horstmann

11 November 1978 13	Bayern Munich	1–1	SV Darmstadt 98	Munich
15:30 CET	Breitner 57' (pen.)	Report	Hahn 89'; Kleppinger (yellow card)	Stadium: Olympic Stadium; Attendance: 19,000; Referee: Winifried Walz

18 November 1978 14	1. FC Kaiserslautern	2–1	Bayern Munich	Kaiserslautern
15:30 CET	Toppmöller 30', 41'; Briegel (yellow card)	Report	Müller 84'; Breitner (yellow card); Rausch (yellow card); Dürnberger (yellow card); Niedermayer (yellow card)	Stadium: Betzenbergstadion; Attendance: 34,225; Referee: Dr. Dieter Stäglich

25 November 1978 15	Bayern Munich	4–0	1. FC Nürnberg	Munich
15:30 CET	Schwarzenbeck 4'; Oblak 39'; Breitner 53', 68' (pen.); Augenthaler (yellow card)	Report	Beierlorzer (yellow card)	Stadium: Olympic Stadium; Attendance: 50,000; Referee: Volker Roth

9 December 1978 16	Fortuna Düsseldorf	7–1	Bayern Munich	Düsseldorf
15:30 CET	K. Allofs 1', 24'; Seel 51', 58'; Zimmermann 65' (pen.); E. Günther 74', 86'	Report	Augenthaler 22'	Stadium: Rheinstadion; Attendance: 26,000; Referee: Walter Engel

16 December 1978 17	Bayern Munich	0–1	Hamburger SV	Munich
15:30 CET	Augenthaler (yellow card)	Report	Memering 19'; Magath (yellow card)	Stadium: Olympic Stadium; Attendance: 56,000; Referee: Gerd Henning

10 February 1979 18	Bayern Munich	4–0	Borussia Dortmund	Munich
15:30 CET	Dürnberger 9'; Kappellmann 12'; Schwarzenbeck 70'; Oblak 80'	Report		Stadium: Olympic Stadium; Attendance: 10,300; Referee: Medardus Luca

8 May 1979 19	MSV Duisburg	3–1	Bayern Munich	Duisburg
20:00 CET	Dietz 19'; Büsser 25'; Jara 38' (yellow card); Fruck (yellow card)	Report	Oblak 8'	Stadium: Wedaustadion; Attendance: 22,000; Referee: Peter Gabor

27 January 1979 20	Bayern Munich	2–1	FC Schalke 04	Munich
15:30 CET	Rummenigge 48'; Wagner 74' (o.g.)	Report	Abramczik 45'	Stadium: Olympic Stadium; Attendance: 14,000; Referee: Walter Horstmann

3 February 1979 21	Eintracht Frankfurt	2–1	Bayern Munich	Frankfurt
15:30 CET	Pezzey 70' (yellow card); Borchers 76'	Report	Rummenigge 85'; Breitner (yellow card)	Stadium: Waldstadion; Attendance: 43,000; Referee: Volker Roth

10 March 1979 22	Bayern Munich	0–4	Arminia Bielefeld	Munich
15:30 CET	Schwarzenbeck (yellow card)	Report	Eilenfeldt 18', 23'; Graul 51'; Schröder 63'	Stadium: Olympic Stadium; Attendance: 11,000; Referee: Hans-Heinrich Barnick

17 March 1979 23	Eintracht Braunschweig	0–0	Bayern Munich	Braunschweig
15:30 CET	Grobe (yellow card)	Report	Augenthaler (yellow card)	Stadium: Eintracht-Stadion; Attendance: 20,000; Referee: Wolf-Dieter Ahlenfelder

24 March 1979 24	Borussia Mönchengladbach	1–7	Bayern Munich	Mönchengladbach
15:30 CET	Amrath 14'; Bruns (yellow card)	Report	Schwarzenbeck 9'; Rummenigge 17', 37', 75'; Niedermayer 26'; Janzon 45', 84' (yellow card)	Stadium: Bökelbergstadion; Attendance: 28,954; Referee: Jan Redelfs

4 April 1979 25	Bayern Munich	4–0	Werder Bremen	Munich
15:30 CET	Augenthaler 41'; Dürnberger 57'; Janzon 74'; Breitner 89'	Report	Reinders (yellow card)	Stadium: Olympic Stadium; Attendance: 15,000; Referee: Günther Risse

7 April 1979 26	VfL Bochum	0–1	Bayern Munich	Bochum
15:30 CET	Abel (yellow card)	Report	Rummenigge 83' (yellow card); Dürnberger (yellow card)	Stadium: Stadion an der Castroper Straße; Attendance: 34,000; Referee: Helmut Treib

12 April 1979 27	Bayern Munich	1–1	VfB Stuttgart	Munich
20:00 CET	Janzon 67'	Report	Volkert 73' (pen.)	Stadium: Olympic Stadium; Attendance: 77,573; Referee: Walter Eschweiler

18 April 1979 28	Hertha BSC	1–1	Bayern Munich	Berlin
20:00 CET	Beer 28'; Kliemann (yellow card)	Report	Breitner 45'	Stadium: Olympic Stadium; Attendance: 25,000; Referee: Franz-Josef Hontheim

21 April 1979 29	Bayern Munich	5–1	1. FC Köln	Munich
15:30 CET	Rummenigge 8', 44'; Niedermayer 13'; Janzon 41', 67'	Report	Konopka 79'	Stadium: Olympic Stadium; Attendance: 31,000; Referee: Klaus Ohmsen

5 May 1979 30	SV Darmstadt 98	1–3	Bayern Munich	Darmstadt
15:30 CET	Hahn 23'; Bechtold (yellow card); Weiss (yellow card)	Report	Breitner 17', 90' (pen.); Janzon 57'; Oblak (yellow card); Niedermayer (yellow card)	Stadium: Merck-Stadion am Böllenfalltor; Attendance: 24,000; Referee: Rainer Waltert

12 May 1979 31	Bayern Munich	1–0	1. FC Kaiserslautern	Munich
15:30 CET	Rummenigge 42'	Report	Bongartz (yellow card)	Stadium: Olympic Stadium; Attendance: 52,000; Referee: Dr. Dieter Stäglich

19 May 1979 32	1. FC Nürnberg	4–2	Bayern Munich	Nuremberg
15:30 CET	Täuber 3'; Lieberwirth 5'; Weyerich 60' (pen.) (yellow card); Szymanek 88'	Report	Breitner 18' (pen.); Gruber 77'; Rummenigge (yellow card); Augenthaler (yellow card)	Stadium: Städtisches Stadion; Attendance: 48,000; Referee: Werner Burgers

2 June 1979 33	Bayern Munich	1–1	Fortuna Düsseldorf	Munich
15:30 CET	Horsmann 16'; Schwarzenbeck (yellow card)	Report	K. Allofs 23'	Stadium: Olympic Stadium; Attendance: 17,000; Referee: Heinz Quindeau

9 June 1979 34	Hamburger SV	1–2	Bayern Munich	Hamburg
15:30 CET	Keegan 78'; Hidien (yellow card)	Report	Reisinger 73'; Rummenigge 80'	Stadium: Volksparkstadion; Attendance: 61,300; Referee: Rainer Waltert

=== DFB-Pokal ===
5 August 1978 1st Round	Bayern Munich	5–0	SSV Glött	Gundelfingen an der Donau
CET	Schwarzenbeck 15'; Niedermayer 16'; Breitner 18'; Augenthaler 63' (pen.); Müller 81' (pen.)	Report		Stadium: Schwaben Stadion; Attendance: 8,000; Referee: Jürgen Glaw

20 September 1978 2nd Round	Bayern Munich	4–5	VfL Osnabrück	Munich
CET	Janzon 76'; Müller 31' (pen.), 44' (pen.), 51' (pen.); Schwarzenbeck (yellow card); Niedermayer (yellow card)	Report	Wagner 27', 29', 71'; Nordmann 41'; Strunck 69'; Wessel (yellow card); Meyer (yellow card)	Stadium: Olympic Stadium; Attendance: 8,500; Referee: Winfried Walz
