= Karl-Heinz Rummenigge =

German football executive and former player (born 1955)

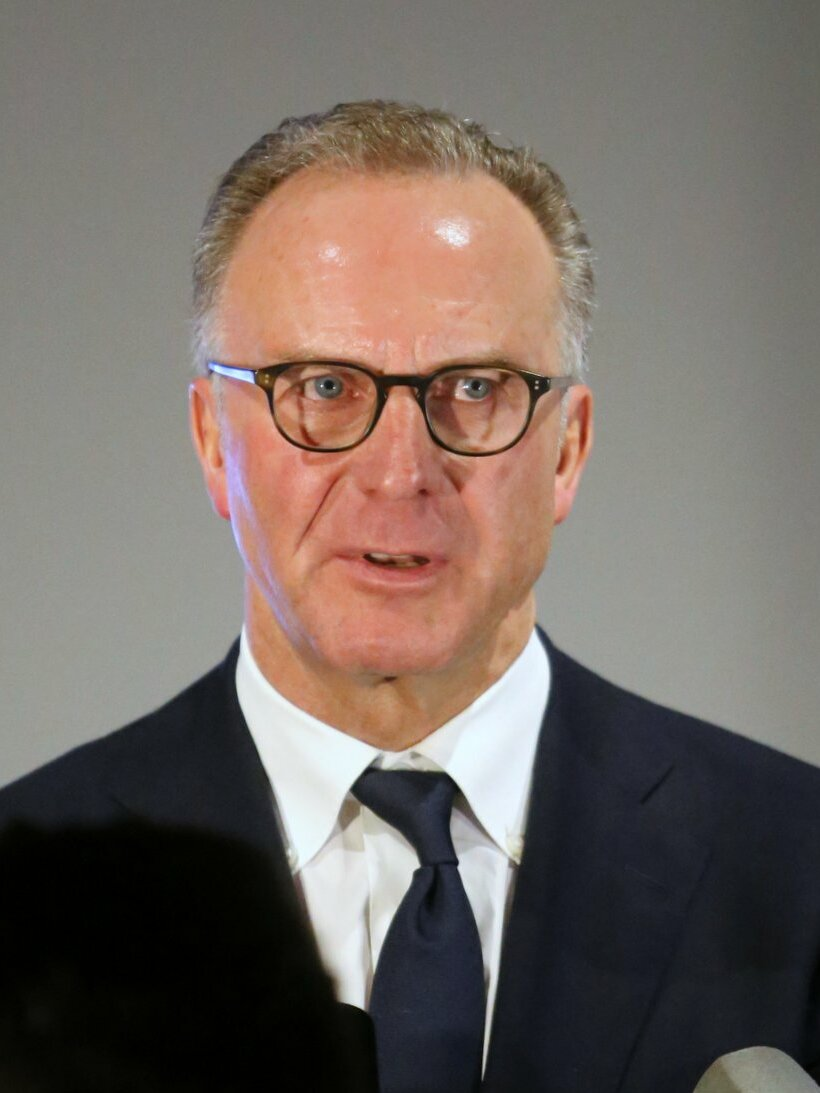
- Rummenigge in 2015

Personal information
- Date of birth: 25 September 1955 (age 71)
- Place of birth: Lippstadt, West Germany
- Height: 1.82 m (6 ft 0 in)
- Position: Forward

Youth career
- 1963–1974: SV Lippstadt 08

Senior career*
Years	Team	Apps	(Gls)
1974–1984	Bayern Munich	310	(162)
1984–1987	Inter Milan	64	(24)
1987–1989	Servette	50	(34)
Total		424	(220)

International career
1975	West Germany B	1	(0)
1976–1986	West Germany	95	(45)
Medal record
Men's football
Representing West Germany
UEFA European Championship
Winner	1980 Italy
FIFA World Cup
Runner-up	1982 Spain
Runner-up	1986 Mexico
- * Club domestic league appearances and goals

Karl-Heinz "Kalle" Rummenigge (German: [ˌkaʁlˈhaɪnts ˈkalə ˈʁʊmənɪɡə]; born 25 September 1955) is a German football executive and former professional footballer. Widely regarded as one of the greatest footballers of all time, he also served as the Chairman of Executive Board of FC Bayern München AG, a daughter company of German Bundesliga team Bayern Munich.

As a player, Rummenigge achieved significant success with Bayern Munich, where he won the Intercontinental Cup, two European Cups, as well as two league titles and two domestic cups. He also won two Ballon d'Or awards, in 1980 and 1981. In 2004, Rummenigge was named by Pelé in the FIFA 100 list of the world's greatest living players.

A member of the West Germany national team, Rummenigge won the 1980 European Championship and captained the squad that finished runner-up in the 1982 and 1986 World Cups.

Rummenigge is a former chairman of the European Club Association (ECA), serving in that capacity from 2008 until 2017. He also served as representative of the ECA to the UEFA Executive Committee from 2021 to 2024.

== Club career ==
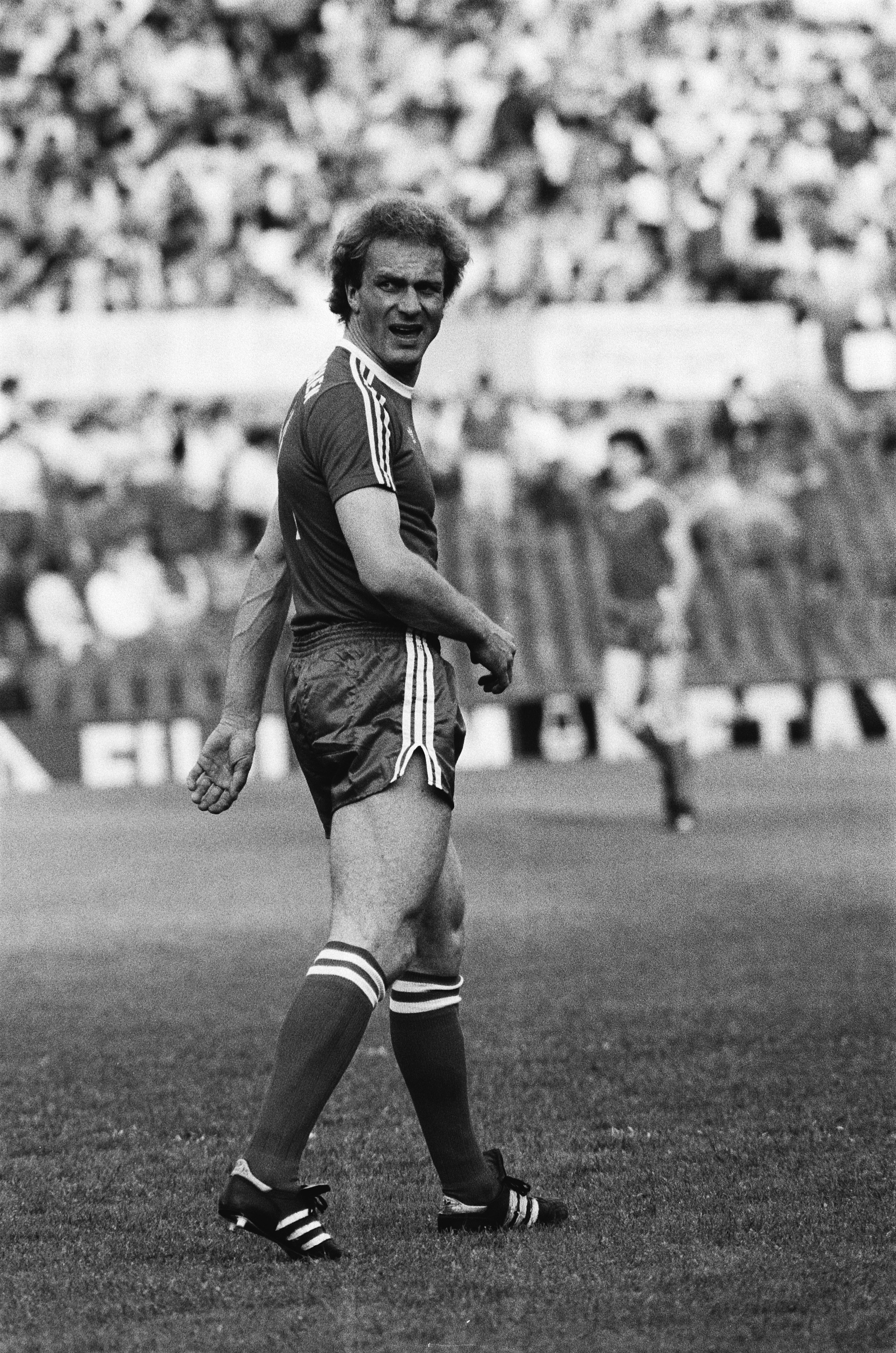
Rummenigge with Bayern Munich in 1982

Rummenigge was born in Lippstadt, North Rhine-Westphalia.

He joined Bayern Munich in 1974, coming from the Westphalian amateur side Borussia Lippstadt, for a transfer fee of c.€10,000. He immediately showed strength as a dribbler. His scoring qualities were initially insignificant, but would find improvement in later years, particularly after the arrival of coach Pal Csernai in 1979. In 1979–80, he scored 26 goals and became for the first time the Bundesliga's top striker, a feat he repeated in 1981 and 1984 with 29 and 26 goals, respectively.

With Bayern, he won the European Cup in 1975 and 1976. In 1975, he did not take part in the final of the competition, whilst in the year thereafter a glass of brandy sufficiently prepared the nervous Rummenigge to contribute to the defeat of AS Saint-Étienne. In the same year he became also part of the team that prevailed in the Intercontinental Cup finals against Cruzeiro EC from Belo Horizonte.

During the tenure of coach Pál Csernai, he developed an effective partnership with midfielder Paul Breitner. The duo was nicknamed ‘Breitnigge,’ a portmanteau coined by the German newspaper Bild.

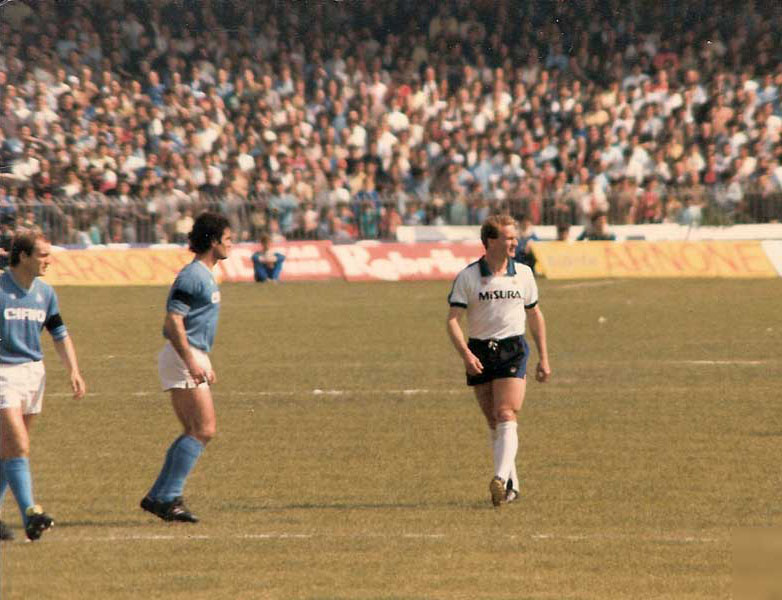
Rummenigge (far right) with Inter Milan during an away Serie A match against Napoli in 1985.

The club, then often dubbed as "FC Breitnigge", won in this period the Bundesliga title in 1980 and 1981, and the DFB-Pokal in 1982 and 1984. A renewed triumph in the European Cup was denied, when the club lost the 1982 final narrowly against Aston Villa. In the season before Rummenigge was top-scorer in this competition with 6 goals.

His substantial contribution to the successes of the club and the Germany national football team found also expression in personal honours. In 1980, he was named German Footballer of the Year and in 1980–81 the European Footballer of the Year.

In 1984, aged 29, he was sold for a record fee of €5.7m to Inter Milan. Despite a notable beginning, in which he helped the team to compete until the end for the 1984–85 Scudetto, Rumenigge's career in Italy was mostly marred by injury problems. At the end of his contract in 1987, Rummenigge moved on to Swiss first division club Servette FC in Geneva, where he saw his career out. In his last season, 1988–89, he had his last success, becoming top scorer in the Swiss league with 24 goals.

== International career ==
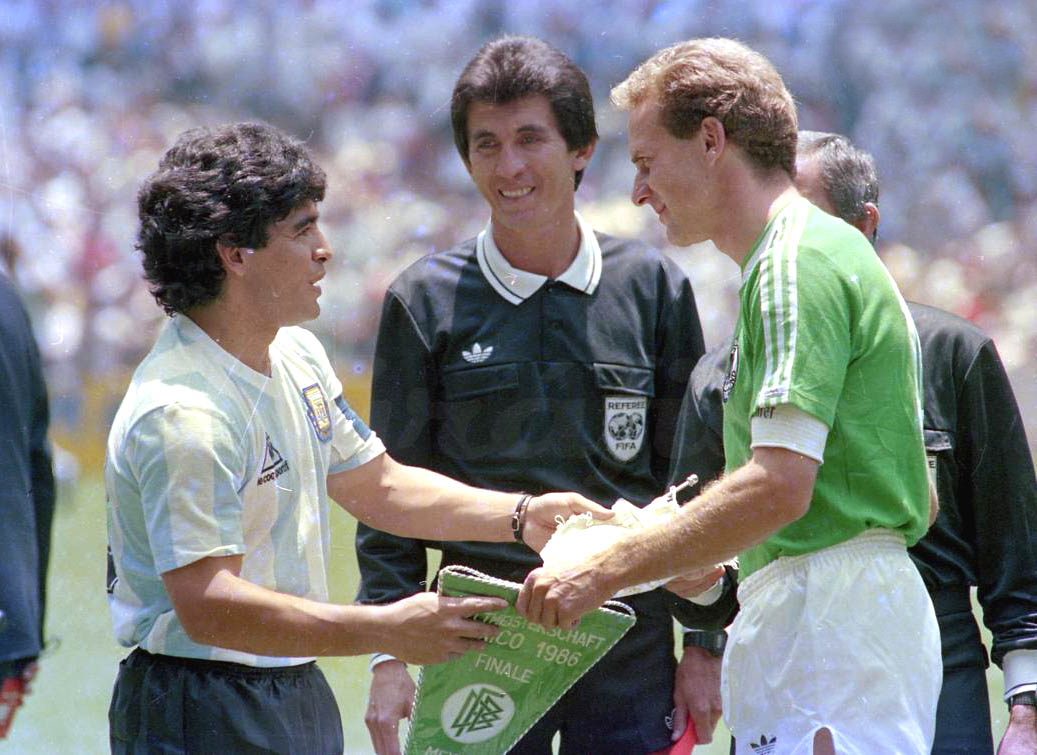
Rummenigge (right) with Diego Maradona before the 1986 FIFA World Cup Final

With the West Germany national team he took part in the 1978 World Cup in Argentina, the 1982 World Cup in Spain and the 1986 World Cup in Mexico. In 1978, West Germany exited in the second group stage of the tournament. In 1982 and 1986, the team were runners-up to Italy and Argentina, giving him the unique distinction of captaining the senior team to two silver medals in the FIFA World Cup.

Rummenigge also took part in two European Championship tournaments. In the 1980 competition in Italy, West Germany defeated Belgium in the final by 2–1 to win their second UEFA Euro.

Altogether, between 1976 and 1986, Rummenigge amassed 95 caps and scored 45 goals for West Germany, including one in extra-time in the 1982 World Cup semi-final victory over France, and one in the losing 1986 World Cup final match against Argentina. He also scored a hat-trick in a group stage game against Chile during the 1982 World Cup.

== Style of play ==
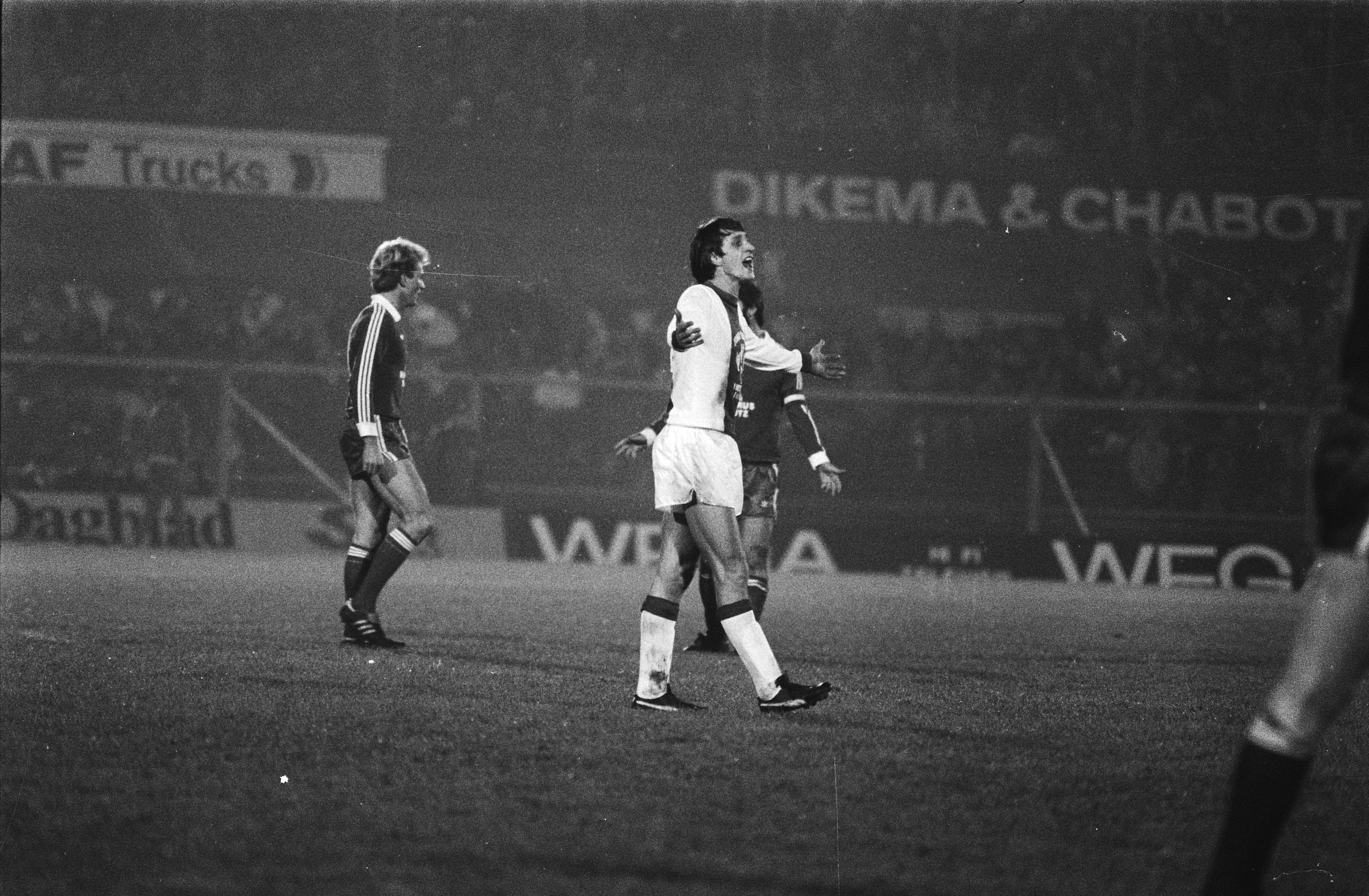
Rummenigge (left) during Johan Cruyff's farewell match for Ajax in 1978.

Known as an attacker, Rummenigge was capable of playing as a centre-forward, second striker, or winger. He was renowned for his movement. Renowned for his exceptional goalscoring instincts, he was capable of scoring from difficult positions.

Rummenigge was also praised for his both-footedness, aerial ability, leadership and professionalism. Although his later career was hampered by recurring injuries, particularly following his move to Inter Milan, he remained an effective and influential attacking player.

== Bayern Munich management ==
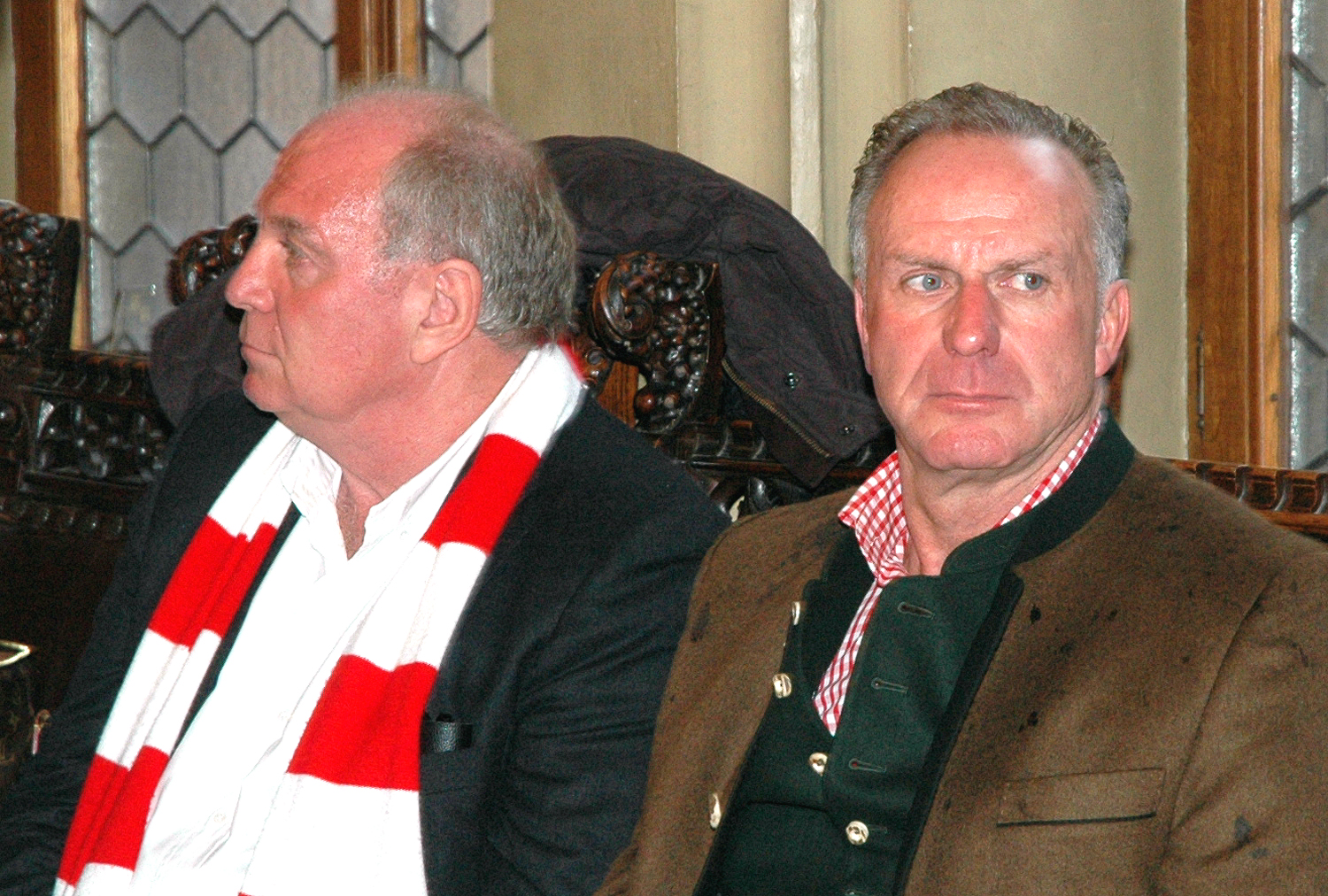
Rummenigge (right) with Uli Hoeneß in 2013

In autumn 1991, Bayern Munich invited Franz Beckenbauer and Rummenigge to return to the club as vice presidents. Rummenigge held this position until February 2002, when he was appointed Chairman of Executive Board of the newly corporatised football department of the club (FC Bayern München AG). According to the club, "in his role as chairman he is responsible for external relations, new media, board affairs and representing the holding company on national and international bodies."

During his tenure, Bayern Munich managed to move to their new stadium, Allianz Arena. Oliver Kahn took over his CEO position at Bayern Munich from 1 July 2021. Rummenigge was appointed a member of the supervisory board on 30 May 2023.

== Miscellaneous ==
In April 1983, the British pop duo Alan & Denise recorded a tribute song about his "sexy knees" in the song "Rummenigge". The single reached number 43 in German charts.

From 1990 until 1994, Rummenigge worked as a TV co–commentator for matches of the German national team.

In March 2004, he was named by Pelé as one of the top 125 greatest living footballers.

His brother Michael Rummenigge was also a noteworthy footballer, who played as a forward for Bayern Munich and Borussia Dortmund and was capped twice by West Germany.

Rummenigge and his wife Martina have three sons and two daughters born between 1980 and 1991.

Rummenigge is a Catholic though also stated that "not very religious".

Rummenigge supports ending the 50+1 rule.

== Career statistics ==
=== Club ===
Appearances and goals by club, season and competition
Club	Season	League			National cup (Note: Includes DFB-Pokal, Coppa Italia, Swiss Cup)		Europe		Other		Total	
Club	Season	Division	Apps	Goals	Apps	Goals	Apps	Goals	Apps	Goals	Apps	Goals
Bayern Munich	1974–75	Bundesliga	21	5	3	1	4 (Note: Appearances in European Cup)	0	—		28	6
Bayern Munich	1975–76	Bundesliga	32	8	7	2	9	3	2 (Note: Appearances in European Super Cup)	0	50	13
Bayern Munich	1976–77	Bundesliga	31	12	5	2	6	1	4 (Note: Two appearances in European Super Cup, two appearances in Intercontinental Cup)	0	46	15
Bayern Munich	1977–78	Bundesliga	29	8	3	0	6 (Note: Appearances in UEFA Cup)	6	—		38	14
Bayern Munich	1978–79	Bundesliga	34	14	2	0	—		—		36	14
Bayern Munich	1979–80	Bundesliga	34	26	3	5	10	5	—		47	36
Bayern Munich	1980–81	Bundesliga	34	29	3	4	8	6	—		45	39
Bayern Munich	1981–82	Bundesliga	32	14	7	7	9	6	—		48	27
Bayern Munich	1982–83	Bundesliga	34	20	2	0	6 (Note: Appearances in European Cup Winners' Cup)	1	—		42	21
Bayern Munich	1983–84	Bundesliga	29	26	7	4	6	2	—		42	32
Bayern Munich	Total		310	162	42	25	64	30	6	0	422	217
Inter Milan	1984–85	Serie A	26	8	9	5	9	5	—		44	18
Inter Milan	1985–86	Serie A	24	13	6	2	9	3	—		39	18
Inter Milan	1986–87	Serie A	14	3	5	2	5	1	—		24	6
Inter Milan	Total		64	24	20	9	23	9	—		107	42
Servette	1987–88	Nationalliga A	28	10			—		—		28	10
Servette	1988–89	Nationalliga A	32	24			4	0	—		36	24
Servette	Total		60	34			4	0	—		64	34
Career total			434	220	62	34	91	39	6	0	593	293

=== International ===
Appearances and goals by national team and year
National team	Year	Apps	Goals
Germany	1976	2	0
Germany	1977	6	1
Germany	1978	12	4
Germany	1979	8	5
Germany	1980	10	4
Germany	1981	11	9
Germany	1982	13	9
Germany	1983	10	8
Germany	1984	8	1
Germany	1985	6	3
Germany	1986	9	1
Total		95	45

Scores and results list West Germany's goal tally first, score column indicates score after each Rummenigge goal.

List of international goals scored by Karl-Heinz Rummenigge
No.	Date	Venue	Opponent	Score	Result	Competition
1	8 October 1977	Olympic Stadium, West Berlin, West Germany	Italy	2–0	2–1	Friendly
2	6 June 1978	Estadio Chateau Carreras, Córdoba, Argentina	Mexico	3–0	6–0	FIFA World Cup 1978
3	6 June 1978	Estadio Chateau Carreras, Córdoba, Argentina	Mexico	5–0	6–0	FIFA World Cup 1978
4	21 June 1978	Estadio Chateau Carreras, Córdoba, Argentina	Austria	1–0	2–3	FIFA World Cup 1978
5	20 December 1978	Rheinstadion, Düsseldorf, West Germany	Netherlands	1–0	3–1	Friendly
6	22 May 1979	Lansdowne Road, Dublin, Republic of Ireland	Republic of Ireland	1–1	3–1	Friendly
7	12 September 1979	Olympic Stadium, West Berlin, West Germany	Argentina	2–0	2–1	Friendly
8	17 October 1979	Müngersdorfer Stadion, Cologne, West Germany	Wales	4–0	5–1	UEFA Euro 1980 qualifying
9	21 November 1979	Boris Paichadze Stadium, Tbilisi, Soviet Union	Soviet Union	1–0	3–1	Friendly
10	21 November 1979	Boris Paichadze Stadium, Tbilisi, Soviet Union	Soviet Union	2–0	3–1	Friendly
11	27 February 1980	Weserstadion, Bremen, West Germany	Malta	7–0	8–0	UEFA Euro 1980 qualifying
12	13 May 1980	Waldstadion, Frankfurt, West Germany	Poland	1–0	3–1	Friendly
13	11 June 1980	Stadio Olimpico, Rome, Italy	Czechoslovakia	1–0	1–0	UEFA Euro 1980
14	3 December 1980	Vasil Levski National Stadium, Sofia, Bulgaria	Bulgaria	3–0	3–1	FIFA World Cup 1982 qualifying
15	2 September 1981	Silesian Stadium, Chorzów, Poland	Poland	2–0	2–0	Friendly
16	23 September 1981	Ruhrstadion, Bochum, West Germany	Finland	2–1	7–1	FIFA World Cup 1982 qualifying
17	23 September 1981	Ruhrstadion, Bochum, West Germany	Finland	4–1	7–1	FIFA World Cup 1982 qualifying
18	23 September 1981	Ruhrstadion, Bochum, West Germany	Finland	6–1	7–1	FIFA World Cup 1982 qualifying
19	18 November 1981	Westfalenstadion, Dortmund, West Germany	Albania	1–0	8–0	FIFA World Cup 1982 qualifying
20	18 November 1981	Westfalenstadion, Dortmund, West Germany	Albania	2–0	8–0	FIFA World Cup 1982 qualifying
21	18 November 1981	Westfalenstadion, Dortmund, West Germany	Albania	5–0	8–0	FIFA World Cup 1982 qualifying
22	22 November 1981	Rheinstadion, Düsseldorf, West Germany	Bulgaria	2–0	4–0	FIFA World Cup 1982 qualifying
23	22 November 1981	Rheinstadion, Düsseldorf, West Germany	Bulgaria	4–0	4–0	FIFA World Cup 1982 qualifying
24	12 May 1982	Ullevaal Stadion, Oslo, Norway	Norway	1–0	4–2	Friendly
25	12 May 1982	Ullevaal Stadion, Oslo, Norway	Norway	4–2	4–2	Friendly
26	16 June 1982	El Molinón, Gijón, Spain	Algeria	1–1	1–2	FIFA World Cup 1982
27	20 June 1982	El Molinón, Gijón, Spain	Chile	1–0	4–1	FIFA World Cup 1982
28	20 June 1982	El Molinón, Gijón, Spain	Chile	2–0	4–1	FIFA World Cup 1982
29	20 June 1982	El Molinón, Gijón, Spain	Chile	3–0	4–1	FIFA World Cup 1982
30	8 July 1982	Estadio Ramón Sánchez Pizjuán, Seville, Spain	France	2–3	3–3 (a.e.t.), 5–4 (pen.)	FIFA World Cup 1982
31	13 October 1982	Wembley Stadium, London, England	England	1–0	2–1	Friendly
32	13 October 1982	Wembley Stadium, London, England	England	2–0	2–1	Friendly
33	30 March 1983	Qemal Stafa, Tirana, Albania	Albania	2–0	2–1	UEFA Euro 1984 qualifying
34	23 April 1983	İzmir Atatürk Stadium, İzmir, Turkey	Turkey	1–0	3–0	UEFA Euro 1984 qualifying
35	23 April 1983	İzmir Atatürk Stadium, İzmir, Turkey	Turkey	3–0	3–0	UEFA Euro 1984 qualifying
36	7 June 1983	Stade Municipal, Luxembourg City, Luxembourg	Yugoslavia	4–2	4–2	Friendly (Jubilee match: 75 years FLF)
37	5 October 1983	Parkstadion, Gelsenkirchen, West Germany	Austria	1–0	3–0	UEFA Euro 1984 qualifying
38	26 October 1983	Olympic Stadium, West Berlin, West Germany	Turkey	2–0	5–1	UEFA Euro 1984 qualifying
39	26 October 1983	Olympic Stadium, West Berlin, West Germany	Turkey	5–1	5–1	UEFA Euro 1984 qualifying
40	20 November 1983	Ludwigspark Stadion, Saarbrücken, West Germany	Albania	1–1	2–1	UEFA Euro 1984 qualifying
41	17 October 1984	Müngersdorfer Stadion, Cologne, West Germany	Sweden	2–0	2–0	FIFA World Cup 1986 qualifying
42	27 March 1985	Ludwigspark Stadion, Saarbrücken, West Germany	Malta	5–0	6–0	FIFA World Cup 1986 qualifying
43	27 March 1985	Ludwigspark Stadion, Saarbrücken, West Germany	Malta	6–0	6–0	FIFA World Cup 1986 qualifying
44	17 November 1985	Olympic Stadium, Munich, West Germany	Czechoslovakia	2–2	2–2	FIFA World Cup 1986 qualifying
45	29 June 1986	Estadio Azteca, Mexico City, Mexico	Argentina	1–2	2–3	FIFA World Cup 1986

== Honours ==
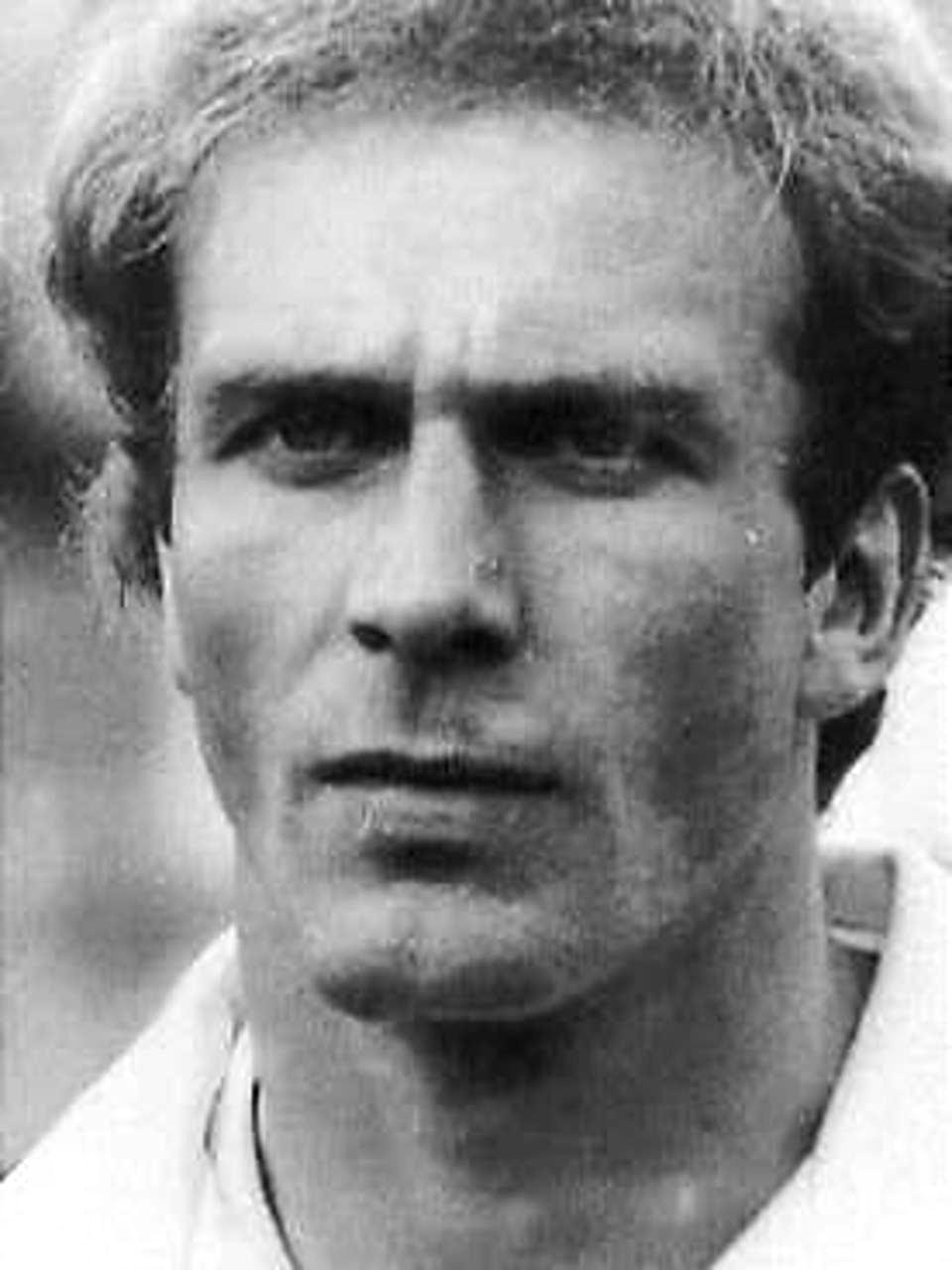
Rummenigge in 1982

Bayern Munich

- Bundesliga: 1979–80, 1980–81
- DFB-Pokal: 1981–82, 1983–84
- European Cup: 1974–75, 1975–76
- Intercontinental Cup: 1976

West Germany

- UEFA European Championship: 1980
- FIFA World Cup runner-up: 1982, 1986

Individual

- Kicker Bundesliga Team of the Season: 1977–78, 1978–79, 1979–80, 1980–81, 1981–82, 1982–83, 1983–84
- Sport Ideal European XI: 1979, 1980
- Guérin Sportivo All-Star team: 1980, 1981, 1982, 1983, 1984
- Bundesliga Top Goalscorer: 1979–80, 1980–81, 1983–84
- Goal of the Year (Germany): 1980, 1981
- Footballer of the Year (Germany): 1980
- Guérin Sportivo Player of the Year. 1980
- UEFA European Championship Team of the Tournament: 1980
- Ballon d'Or: 1980, 1981; runner-up: 1979
- Onze d'Or 1980, 1981
- Onze de Bronze: 1983
- Onze Mondial: 1980, 1981, 1983, 1984, 1985
- Bravo Otto: 1980, 1981, 1982, 1983, 1984
- European Cup Top Goalscorer: 1980–81
- FIFA World Cup Silver Shoe: 1982
- FIFA World Cup Bronze Ball: 1982
- FIFA World Cup All-Star Team: 1982
- DFB Pokal Top Goalscorer: 1981–82
- World XI: 1982, 1983, 1984, 1985
- Serie A Team of The Year: 1985
- Swiss League Top Goalscorer: 1988–89
- Swiss Foreign Footballer of the Year: 1988–89
- FIFA 100
- Bayern Munich All-time XI
- Golden Foot, as football legend: 2009
- 'Best European Manager' at the Golden Boy Awards by Tuttosport: 2020
- Italian Football Hall of Fame: 2021

== See also ==
- List of European association football families
- List of FIFA World Cup top goalscorers

== Notes ==
Sporting positions
Preceded by Bernard Dietz	Germany captain 1981–1986	Succeeded by Harald Schumacher
Preceded by Paul Breitner	Bayern Munich captain 1983–1984	Succeeded by Klaus Augenthaler
