= 1979 Ballon d'Or =

Annual association football award event in France

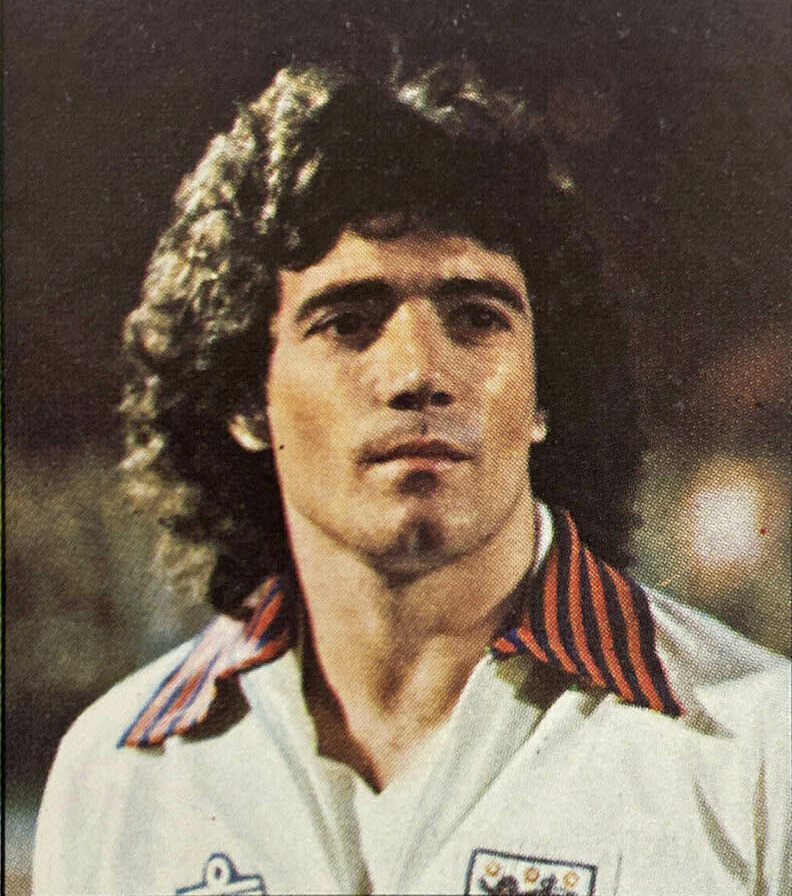
- 1979 Ballon d'Or winner, Kevin Keegan in 1980
- Date: 25 December 1979
- Presented by: France Football

Highlights
- Won by: (England) Kevin Keegan (2nd award)
- Website: ballondor.com

The 1979 Ballon d'Or, given to the best football player in Europe as judged by a panel of sports journalists from UEFA member countries, was awarded to the English forward Kevin Keegan on 25 December 1979. There were 26 voters, from Austria, Belgium, Bulgaria, Czechoslovakia, Denmark, East Germany, England, Finland, France, Greece, Hungary, Italy, Luxembourg, the Netherlands, Poland, Portugal, Republic of Ireland, Romania, Scotland, Soviet Union, Spain, Sweden, Switzerland, Turkey, West Germany and Yugoslavia.

== Rankings ==
Rank	Name	Club(s)	Nationality	Points
1	Kevin Keegan	(West Germany) Hamburger SV	England	118
2	Karl-Heinz Rummenigge	(West Germany) Bayern Munich	West Germany	52
3	Ruud Krol	(Netherlands) Ajax	Netherlands	41
4	Manfred Kaltz	(West Germany) Hamburger SV	West Germany	27
5	Michel Platini	(France) Saint-Étienne	France	23
6	Paolo Rossi	(Italy) Perugia	Italy	16
7	Trevor Francis	(England) Nottingham Forest	England	13
7	Liam Brady	(England) Arsenal	Republic of Ireland	13
9	Zbigniew Boniek	(Poland) Widzew Łódź	Poland	8
9	Zdeněk Nehoda	(Czech Republic) Dukla Prague	Czechoslovakia	8
11	Kenny Dalglish	(England) Liverpool	Scotland	7
11	Allan Simonsen	(Spain) Barcelona	Denmark	7
13	Paul Breitner	(West Germany) Bayern Munich	West Germany	6
13	Kees Kist	(Netherlands) AZ	Netherlands	6
15	Johnny Rep	(France) Saint-Étienne	Netherlands	5
15	Tony Woodcock	(West Germany) 1. FC Köln	England	5
15	Hans Krankl	(Spain) Barcelona	Austria	5
15	Safet Sušić	(Socialist Federal Republic of Yugoslavia) FK Sarajevo	SFR Yugoslavia	5
19	Uli Stielike	(Spain) Real Madrid	West Germany	4
20	Marius Trésor	(France) Marseille	France	3
21	João Alves	(France) Paris Saint-Germain	Portugal	2
21	Franco Causio	(Italy) Juventus	Italy	2
21	Gordon McQueen	(England) Manchester United	Scotland	2
21	René van de Kerkhof	(Netherlands) PSV Eindhoven	Netherlands	2
21	Bruno Pezzey	(West Germany) Eintracht Frankfurt	Austria	2
21	Simon Tahamata	(Netherlands) Ajax	Netherlands	2
27	Juan Manuel Asensi	(Spain) Barcelona	Spain	1
27	Trevor Brooking	(England) West Ham United	England	1
27	Ronnie Hellström	(West Germany) Kaiserslautern	Sweden	1
27	Hansi Müller	(West Germany) VfB Stuttgart	West Germany	1
27	Antonín Panenka	(Czechoslovakia) Bohemians 1905	Czechoslovakia	1
27	Walter Schachner	Austria Wien	Austria	1
