= 1980 Ballon d'Or =

Annual association football award event in France

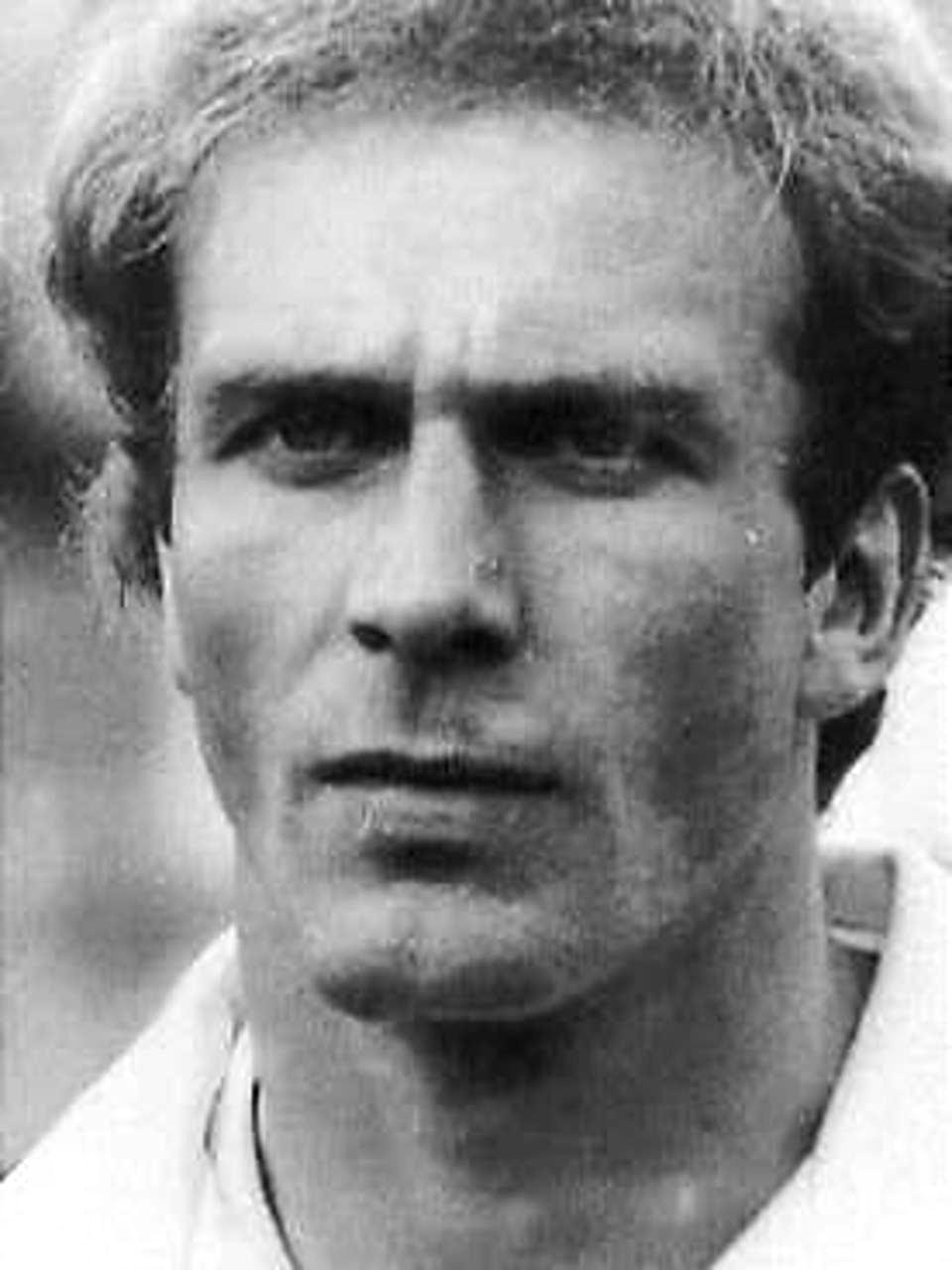
- 1980 Ballon d'Or winner, Karl-Heinz Rummenigge in 1982
- Date: 30 December 1980
- Presented by: France Football

Highlights
- Won by: (Germany) Karl-Heinz Rummenigge (1st award)
- Website: ballondor.com

The 1980 Ballon d'Or, given to the best football player in Europe as judged by a panel of sports journalists from UEFA member countries, was awarded to Karl-Heinz Rummenigge on 30 December 1980.

Rummenigge was the third (West) German national to win the award after Gerd Müller in 1970 and Franz Beckenbauer in 1972 and 1976. After these two players, Rummenigge was also the third Bayern Munich player to win the trophy.

== Rankings ==
Rank	Name	Club(s)	Nationality	Points
1	Karl-Heinz Rummenigge	(West Germany) Bayern Munich	West Germany	122
2	Bernd Schuster	(Spain) Barcelona	West Germany	34
3	Michel Platini	(France) Saint-Étienne	France	33
4	Wilfried Van Moer	(Belgium) Beveren	Belgium	27
5	Jan Ceulemans	(Belgium) Club Brugge	Belgium	20
6	Horst Hrubesch	(West Germany) Hamburger SV	West Germany	18
7	Herbert Prohaska (Note: France Football reports Prohaska with 16 points.)	(Italy) Internazionale	Austria	14
8	Hansi Müller	(West Germany) VfB Stuttgart	West Germany	11
8	Liam Brady	(Italy) Juventus	Republic of Ireland	11
10	Manfred Kaltz	(West Germany) Hamburger SV	West Germany	10
11	Erwin Vandenbergh	(Belgium) Lierse	Belgium	9
11	Luis Arconada	(Spain) Real Sociedad	Spain	9
11	Dino Zoff	(Italy) Juventus	Italy	9
14	Kenny Dalglish	(England) Liverpool	Scotland	5
14	Bruno Pezzey (Note: France Football reports Pezzey with 3 points.)	(West Germany) Eintracht Frankfurt	Austria	5
16	Terry McDermott	(England) Liverpool	England	4
16	Viv Anderson	(England) Nottingham Forest	England	4
16	Ruud Krol	(Italy) Napoli	Netherlands	4
16	Francesco Graziani	(Italy) Torino	Italy	4
20	Ladislav Vízek	(Czechoslovakia) Dukla Prague	Czechoslovakia	3
20	Manuel Bento	(Portugal) Benfica	Portugal	3
22	Frank Arnesen	(Netherlands) Ajax	Denmark	2
22	Antonín Panenka	(Czechoslovakia) Bohemians 1905	Czechoslovakia	2
22	David O'Leary	(England) Arsenal	Republic of Ireland	2
22	Vladimir Petrović	(Socialist Federal Republic of Yugoslavia) Red Star Belgrade	SFR Yugoslavia	2
22	Zbigniew Boniek	(Poland) Widzew Łódź	Poland	2
27	Giancarlo Antognoni	(Italy) Fiorentina	Italy	1
27	Alessandro Altobelli	(Italy) Internazionale	Italy	1
27	Marcel Răducanu	(Romania) Steaua București	Romania	1
27	Trevor Francis	(England) Nottingham Forest	England	1
27	Zdeněk Nehoda	(Czechoslovakia) Dukla Prague	Czechoslovakia	1
27	Peter Shilton	(England) Nottingham Forest	England	1
