= Paul Breitner =

German footballer (born 1951)

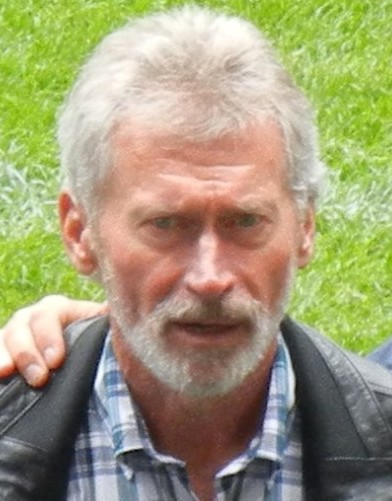
- Breitner pictured at the Allianz Arena in 2011.

Personal information
- Date of birth: 5 September 1951 (age 75)
- Place of birth: Kolbermoor, Bavaria, West Germany
- Height: 1.76 m (5 ft 9 in)
- Positions: Left-back; midfielder

Youth career
- 1957–1961: SV-DJK Kolbermoor
- 1961–1970: ESV Freilassing

Senior career*
Years	Team	Apps	(Gls)
1970–1974	Bayern Munich	109	(17)
1974–1977	Real Madrid	84	(10)
1977–1978	Eintracht Braunschweig	30	(10)
1978–1983	Bayern Munich	146	(66)
Total		369	(103)

International career
1968–1970	West Germany Youth	16	(1)
1971	West Germany U-23	1	(0)
1971–1982	West Germany	48	(10)
Medal record
Men's football
Representing West Germany
FIFA World Cup
Winner	1974 West Germany
Runner-up	1982 Spain
UEFA European Championship
Winner	1972 Belgium
- * Club domestic league appearances and goals

Paul Breitner (German pronunciation: [ˈpaʊl ˈbʁaɪtnɐ]; born 5 September 1951) is a German former professional footballer who played as a midfielder and left-back. Considered one of the best full-backs and midfielders of all time, and one of the best players of his era, Breitner was named in the FIFA World Cup All-Time Team. In 2004 he was named one of the Top 125 greatest living footballers as part of FIFA's 100th anniversary celebration.

Breitner was capped 48 times for West Germany and was an integral part of the team that won the 1974 FIFA World Cup, scoring in the final.

He also scored in the final of the 1982 FIFA World Cup, making him one of only five players to have scored in two different World Cup final matches, the others being Pelé, Vavá, Zinedine Zidane and Kylian Mbappé.

He was known for his partnerships with Franz Beckenbauer, Hans-Georg Schwarzenbeck and Berti Vogts in defence for the national team, and his midfield combination with Karl-Heinz Rummenigge for Bayern Munich.

Breitner has been working as a commentator, pundit and columnist in Germany since retiring and is also an advisor to the Bayern management board.

== Playing career ==
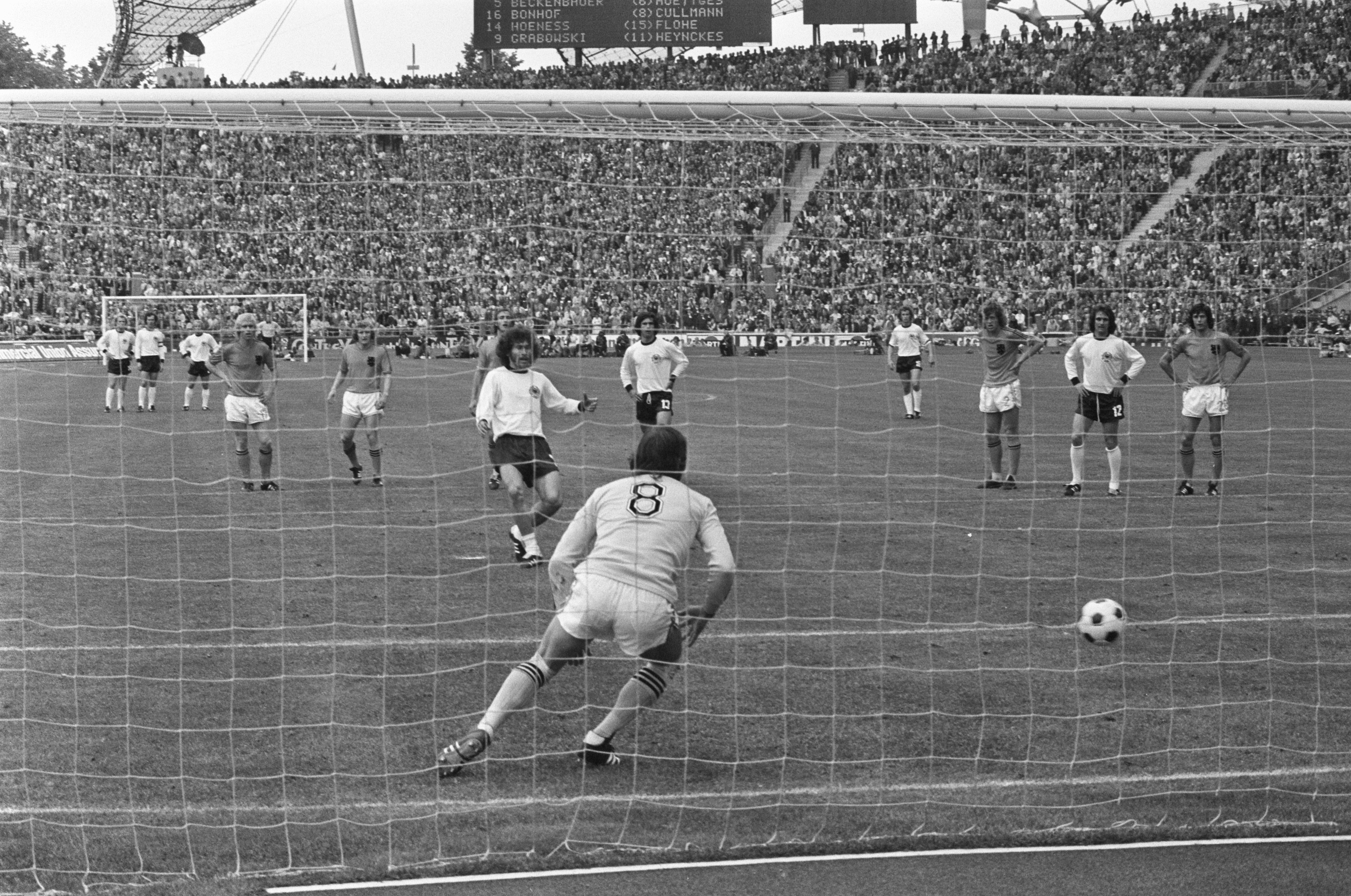
Breitner scoring the equalizer from the penalty spot against the Netherlands in the 1974 World Cup final

Breitner's football career lasted from 1970 until 1983, mainly playing for Bayern Munich (1970–74 and 1978–83) and Real Madrid (1974–77), with one season playing for Eintracht Braunschweig. His early success was as a free roaming left back, as likely to score from the right midfield as to stop an attacker in his own penalty area. Later in his career he moved to midfield and became one of the top midfielders through the early 1980s.

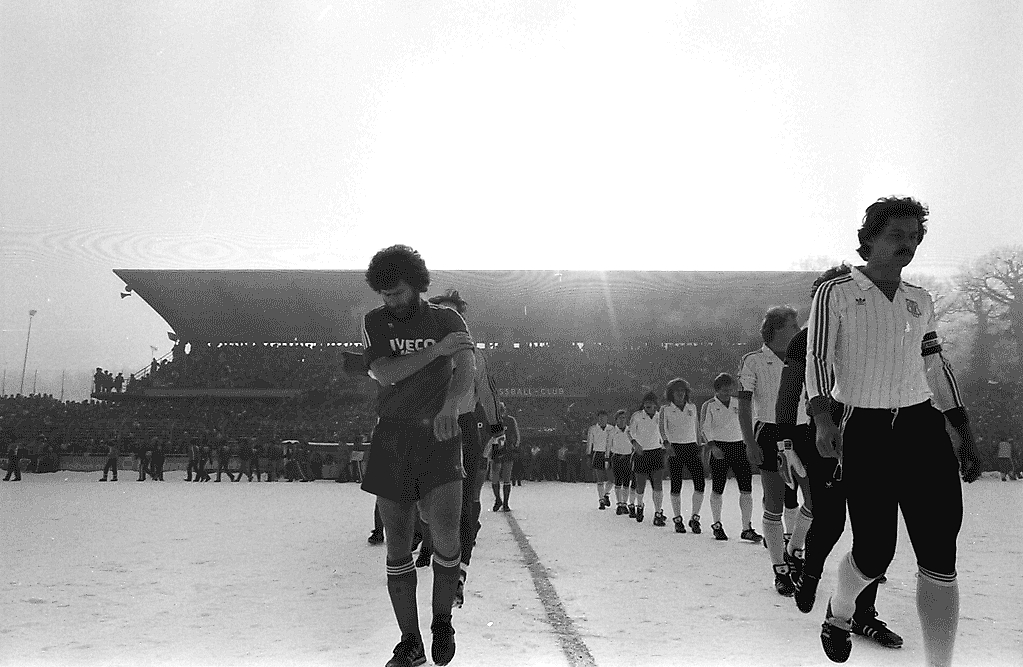
Breitner (left) entering the pitch before the round of 16 match between FC Bayern and Freiburger FC in the West German Cup in January 1982

The early peak of Breitner's long and successful career was at age 21 in 1972 as part of the winning German European Championship team. Two years later he won the 1974 FIFA World Cup. The final was played in Munich against the Netherlands, and Breitner scored the first German goal on a penalty kick. In the final, he, Franz Beckenbauer, Hans-Georg Schwarzenbeck and Berti Vogts formed a formidable unit at the back, their resolute defense preventing the Dutch from getting many scoring chances. He moved to Real Madrid for a fee of over 1 million Deutsche Marks following the World Cup and withdrew from the West German squad, missing the 1978 World Cup, and remaining off the side until enticed to return by Jupp Derwall in 1981. Breitner is one of only five footballers to have achieved the feat of scoring in two different World Cup final matches, sharing that honour with Pelé, Vavá, Zinedine Zidane, and Kylian Mbappé. He achieved this in 1974 against the Netherlands and in 1982 against Italy.

During his club career, Breitner won seven National Championships with Bayern Munich (1972, 1973, 1974, 1980, 1981) and Real Madrid (1975, 1976), the Champions' Cup (1974) as well as the German (1971, 1982) and Spanish cups (1975). During his spell with Bayern Munich, Karl-Heinz Rummenigge and he formed such a formidable one-two-punch that they were often called Breitnigge.

== Political views ==
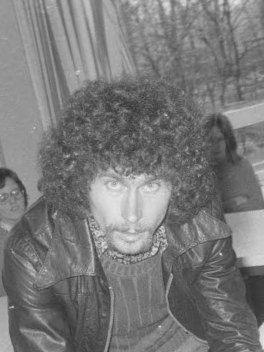
Breitner in 1975

Off the pitch, Breitner self-identified as part of the 68ers (the 1968 protest movement in West Germany and elsewhere). He was often decried by the more traditional or conservative football fans for his radicalism and "revolutionary" attitude, as well as his tendency for voicing strong opinions on major political and social issues, especially during a time when Germany was still divided by the Berlin Wall. He was seen bringing Mao Zedong's "Little Red Book" to training. However, after 1974, Breitner abruptly brushed aside his leftist leanings. Subsequently, he gained notoriety for spending lavishly on houses and cars, as well as participating in lucrative commercials.

Before the 1982 World Cup in Spain he caused a major uproar in West Germany when he accepted an offer by Pitralon, a German cosmetics company, to pay him the – what many Germans regarded at that time as a "scandalously high" – sum of 150,000 Deutsche Mark if he shaved off his fluffy full beard, used their aftershave and advertised for the company. In the previous years his long hair had been perceived as a show of rebellion, and had led him to be nicknamed "Der Afro" in the media. Breitner had previously infuriated many fans with his move to Spanish club giants Real Madrid. He returned to West Germany after the successful spell in Madrid and retired as a player in 1983. About the aftershave incident, Breitner said that he was mistakenly labelled as Maoist after, talking with a journalist about communism, the Soviet Union and France, mentioning that he had Mao Zedong's Little Red Book. He stated "When the atrocities became known, I had nothing to regret about because I never declared myself as a Maoist".

== Style of play ==
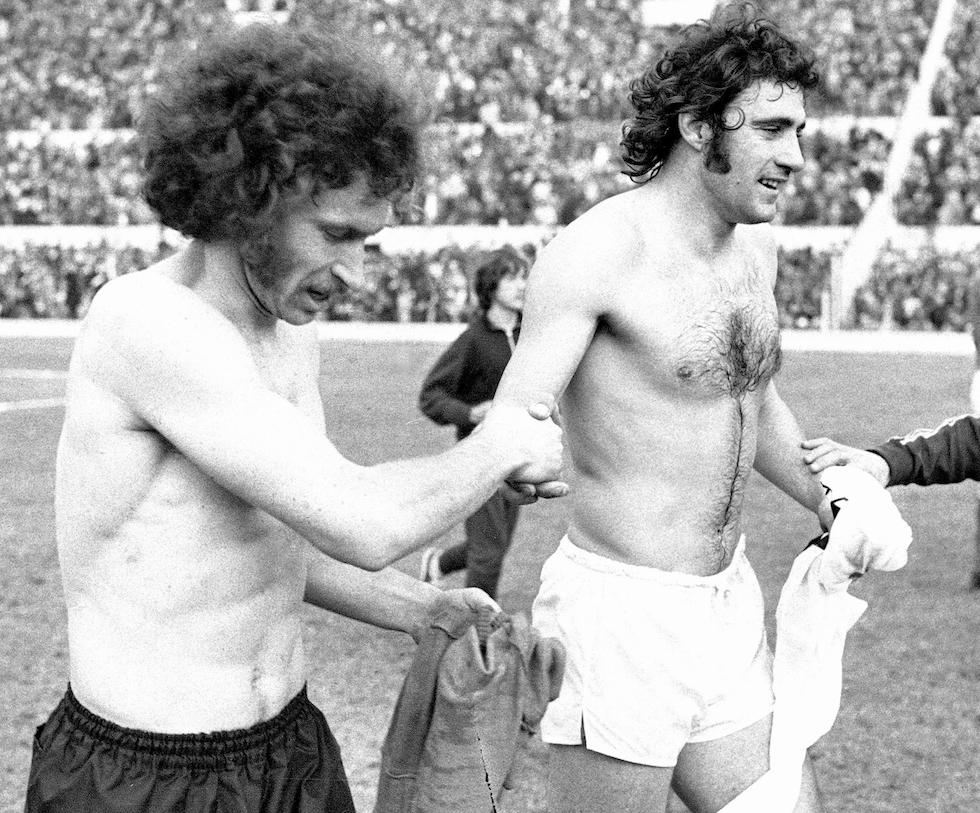
Breitner (left) and Italian forward Giorgio Chinaglia exchange their jerseys after the 0–0 friendly between Italy and West Germany at Rome's Olympic Stadium in 1974.

A tenacious player, Breitner is considered one of Germany and Bayern Munich's finest players. After initially starting out as a forward, in the early part of his career, Breitner was deployed as an attacking full-back or wing-back on the left flank, where he excelled in defending the goal from opponents, as well as at making surging offensive runs, providing crosses to teammates, and scoring from long-range shots. For home games in the 1973–74 where Bayern Munich coach Udo Lattek utilized an ultraoffensive 2–5–3 formation, Breitner played higher up the pitch as a left winger. Under Real Madrid coach Miljan Miljanić, Breitner was converted into a central box-to-box midfielder, where he maintained his defensive and offensive skills, and excelled in a midfield partnership with fellow West German teammate Günter Netzer.

In his second stint with Bayern, he became the brain of the team by creating chances for forwards Karl-Heinz Rummenigge and Dieter Hoeneß; Breitner's partnership with Rummenigge scored a combined total of 46 of Bayern's 89 league goals in 1981, leading the duo to be nicknamed Breitnigge. As a midfielder, Breitner's goal tally increased, notably scoring 28 goals in total for Bayern in the 1981-82 season. Breitner was also renowned for his leadership, stamina, reactions, tackling, and powerful long-range shots with his right foot, as well as his strong character and personality. He was also an expert penalty taker.

== Post-retirement ==
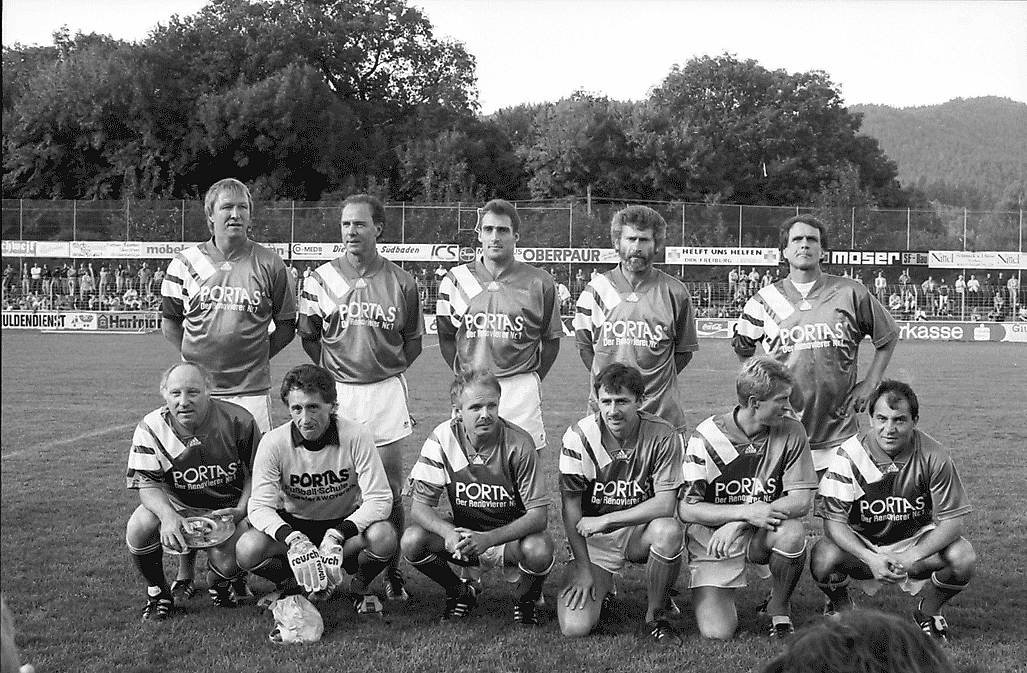
Breitner in 1993 (back row, second from right) at an All-Star match in Freiburg im Breisgau, which also featured Franz Beckenbauer, Uwe Seeler, Horst Hrubesch and Felix Magath.

In 1998, Breitner was announced as the new national team manager by DFB president Egidius Braun. However, after reactions from fellow association officials, Braun reconsidered 17 hours later, making Breitner the infamous 17 Stunden Bundestrainer ("the 17-hour coach").

Today, Breitner mainly works as a TV pundit and newspaper columnist. In March 2007, he entered into a contract with Bayern Munich and acts as an advisor on various issues. He occasionally still plays for the Bayern All-Stars in charity games, captaining the team on several occasions.

== Career statistics ==
Appearances and goals by club, season and competition
Club	Season	League			National Cup (Note: Includes DFB-Pokal, Copa del Rey)		Europe (Note: Includes European Cup, Cup Winners' Cup, UEFA Cup, Inter-Cities Fairs Cup)		Total	
Club	Season	Division	Apps	Goals	Apps	Goals	Apps	Goals	Apps	Goals
Bayern Munich	1969–70	Bundesliga	–		1	0	–		1	0
Bayern Munich	1970–71	Bundesliga	21	2	5	0	4	0	30	2
Bayern Munich	1971–72	Bundesliga	30	4	6	0	8	1	44	5
Bayern Munich	1972–73	Bundesliga	32	4	6	1	5	0	43	5
Bayern Munich	1973–74	Bundesliga	26	7	4	1	7	1	37	9
Bayern Munich	Total		109	17	22	2	24	2	155	21
Real Madrid	1974–75	La Liga	29	3			6	0	35	3
Real Madrid	1975–76	La Liga	25	6			7	0	32	6
Real Madrid	1976–77	La Liga	30	1			3	0	33	1
Real Madrid	Total		84	10			16	0	100	10
Eintracht Braunschweig	1977–78	Bundesliga	30	10	2	0	5	1	37	11
Bayern Munich	1978–79	Bundesliga	33	12	2	1	–		35	13
Bayern Munich	1979–80	Bundesliga	32	10	3	2	10	4	45	16
Bayern Munich	1980–81	Bundesliga	30	17	2	0	8	1	40	18
Bayern Munich	1981–82	Bundesliga	29	18	6	5	7	5	42	28
Bayern Munich	1982–83	Bundesliga	22	9	2	1	6	3	30	13
Bayern Munich	Total		146	66	15	9	31	13	182	84
Career total			369	103	39	11	76	16	484	130

== Honours ==
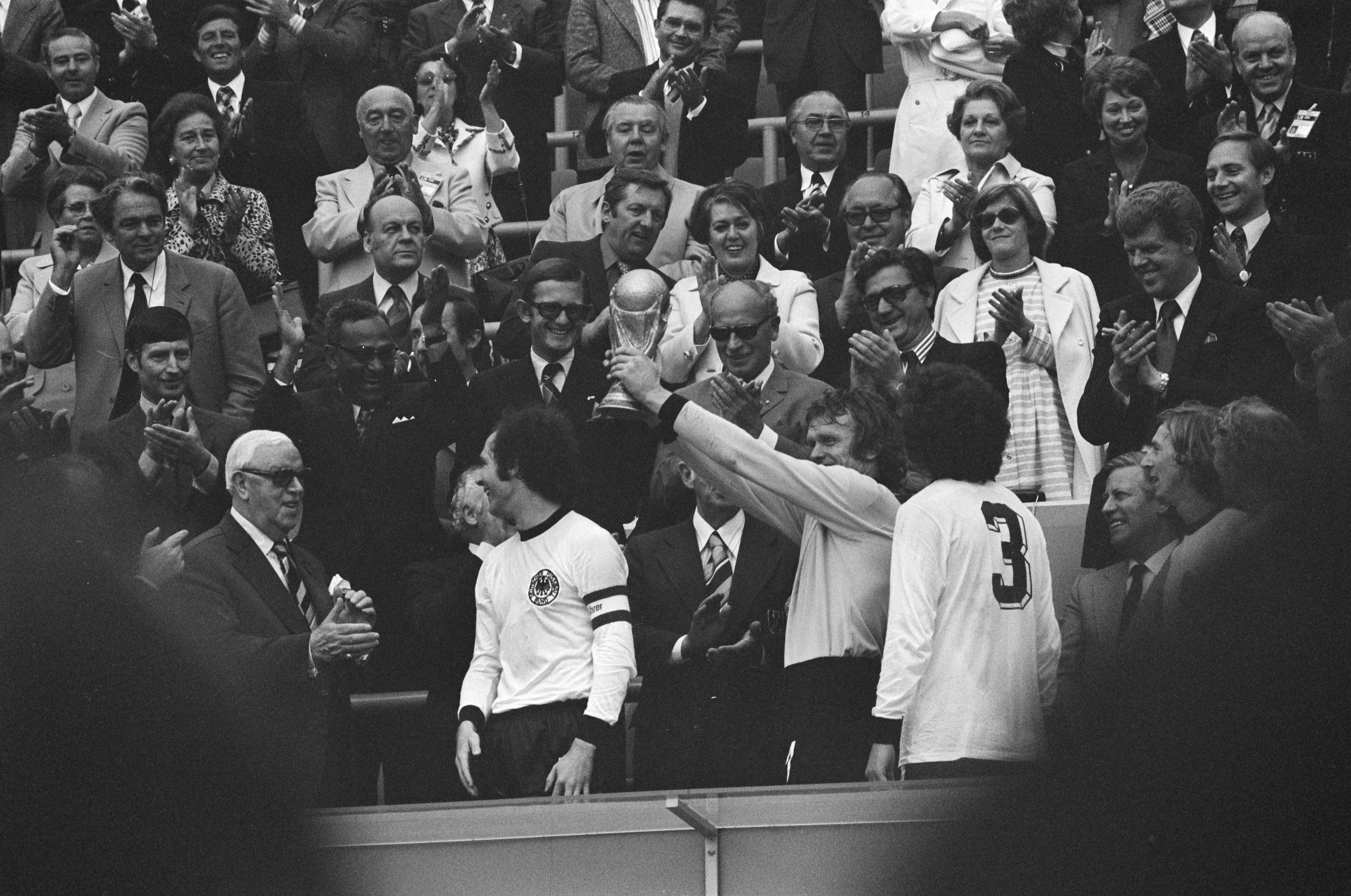
Breitner (number 3) after winning the 1974 FIFA World Cup

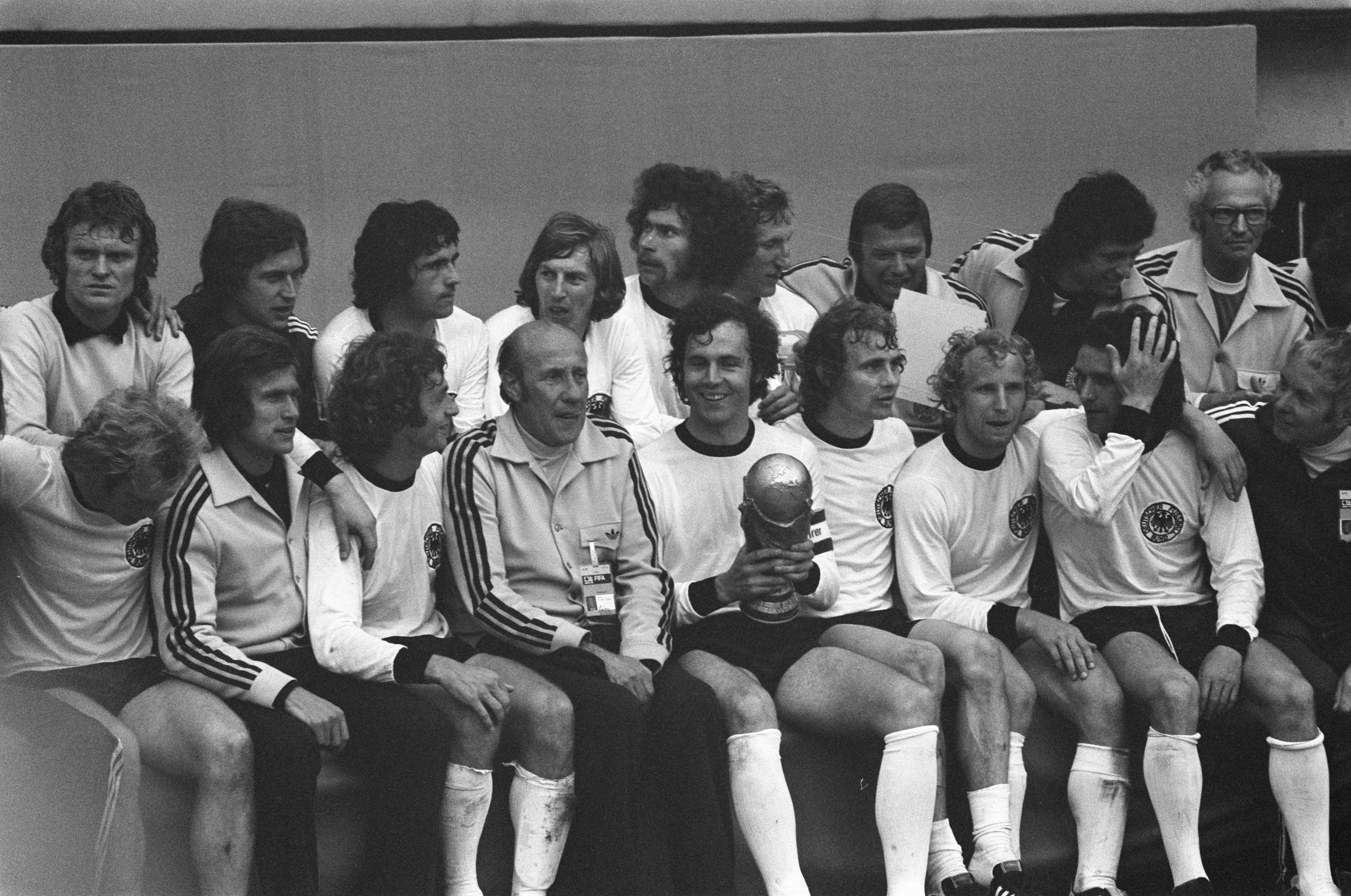
West Germany's 1974 FIFA World Cup-winning team with the trophy

Bayern Munich

- Bundesliga: 1971–72, 1972–73, 1973–74, 1979–80, 1980–81
- DFB-Pokal: 1970–71, 1981–82
- European Cup: 1973–74; runner-up: 1981–82

Real Madrid

- La Liga: 1974–75, 1975–76
- Copa del Rey: 1974–75

West Germany

- FIFA World Cup: 1974; runner-up: 1982
- UEFA European Championship: 1972

Individual

- kicker Bundesliga Team of the Season: 1971–72, 1972–73, 1978–79, 1979–80, 1980–81, 1981–82, 1982–83
- UEFA European Championship Team of the Tournament: 1972
- FIFA World Cup All-Star Team: 1974
- FUWO European Team of the Season: 1972
- World XI: 1972, 1974, 1975, 1976
- Sport Ideal European XI: 1972, 1974, 1979
- Footballer of the Year (Germany): 1981
- Guerin Sportivo All-Star Team: 1981
- Ballon d'Or runner-up: 1981, nominated: 1972, 1974, 1975, 1979.
- Onze d'Argent: 1981
- FIFA World Cup All-Time Team
- FIFA 100
- Bayern Munich All-time XI
- Ballon d'Or Dream Team (bronze): 2020

Sporting positions
Preceded by Dinko Dermendzhiev	FIFA World Cup opening goal 1974	Succeeded by Bernard Lacombe
