= 1981 Ballon d'Or =

Annual association football award event in France

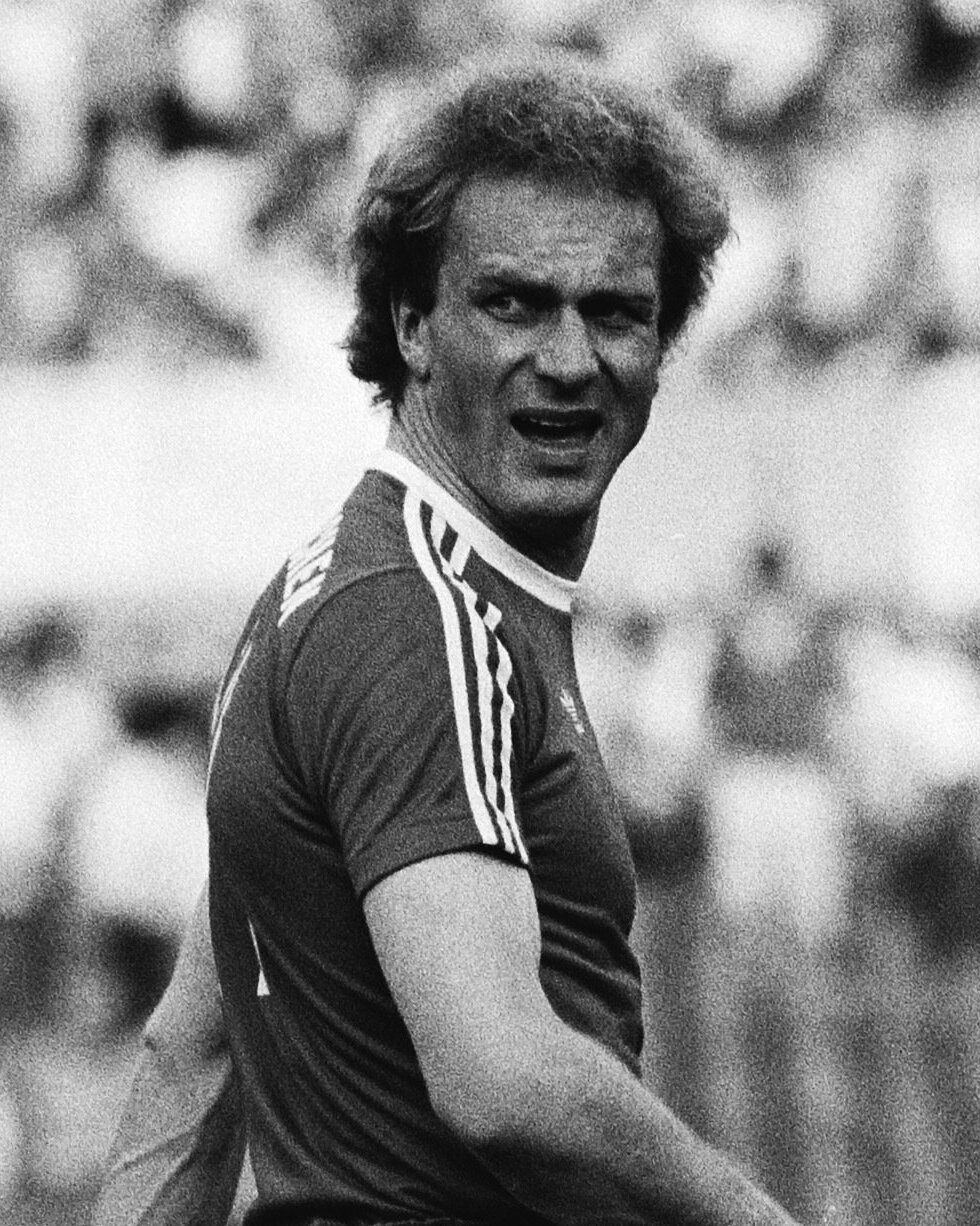
- 1981 Ballon d'Or winner, Karl-Heinz Rummenigge in 1982
- Date: 29 December 1981
- Presented by: France Football

Highlights
- Won by: (Germany) Karl-Heinz Rummenigge (2nd award)
- Website: ballondor.com

The 1981 Ballon d'Or, given to the best football player in Europe as judged by a panel of sports journalists from UEFA member countries, was awarded to Karl-Heinz Rummenigge on 29 December 1981.

This was Rummenigge's second win in succession.

== Rankings ==
Rank	Name	Club(s)	Nationality	Points
1	Karl-Heinz Rummenigge	(West Germany) Bayern Munich	West Germany	106
2	Paul Breitner	(West Germany) Bayern Munich	West Germany	64
3	Bernd Schuster	(Spain) Barcelona	West Germany	39
4	Michel Platini	(France) Saint-Étienne	France	36
5	Oleg Blokhin	(Soviet Union) Dinamo Kyiv	Soviet Union	14
6	Dino Zoff	(Italy) Juventus	Italy	13
7	Ramaz Shengelia	(Soviet Union) Dinamo Tbilisi	Soviet Union	10
8	Alexsandr Chivadze	(Soviet Union) Dinamo Tbilisi	Soviet Union	9
9	Liam Brady	(Italy) Juventus	Republic of Ireland	7
9	John Wark	(England) Ipswich Town	Scotland	7
11	David Kipiani	(Soviet Union) Dinamo Tbilisi	Soviet Union	6
11	András Törőcsik	(Hungary) Újpest	Hungary	6
11	Zbigniew Boniek	(Poland) Widzew Łódź	Poland	6
11	Maxime Bossis	(France) Nantes	France	6
11	Bruno Pezzey	(West Germany) Eintracht Frankfurt	Austria	6
16	Horst Hrubesch	(West Germany) Hamburger SV	West Germany	5
16	Ruud Krol	(Italy) Napoli	Netherlands	5
16	Vladimir Petrović	(Socialist Federal Republic of Yugoslavia) Red Star Belgrade	Yugoslavia	5
19	Zlatko Vujovic	(Socialist Federal Republic of Yugoslavia) Hajduk Split	Yugoslavia	4
19	Trevor Brooking	(England) West Ham United	England	4
21	Giancarlo Antognoni	(Italy) Fiorentina	Italy	3
21	Jan Ceulemans	(Belgium) Club Brugge	Belgium	3
21	Kenny Dalglish	(England) Liverpool	Scotland	3
21	Bryan Robson	(England) Manchester United	England	3
21	Frank Stapleton	(England) Manchester United	Ireland	3
21	Wilfried Van Moer	(Belgium) Beveren	Belgium	3
21	Luis Arconada	(Spain) Real Sociedad	Spain	3
28	Grzegorz Lato	(Belgium) Lokeren	Poland	2
28	Tibor Nyilasi	(Hungary) Ferencváros	Hungary	2
28	Wlodzimierz Smolarek	(Poland) Widzew Łódź	Poland	2
28	Frans Thijssen	(England) Ipswich Town	Netherlands	2
32	António Oliveira	(Portugal) Sporting CP	Portugal	1
32	Uli Stielike	(Spain) Real Madrid	West Germany	1
32	Jesús Zamora	(Spain) Real Sociedad	Spain	1
