= 1980–81 Bundesliga =

18th season of the Bundesliga

Bundesliga
- Season: 1980–81
- Dates: 15 August 1980 – 13 June 1981
- Champions: Bayern Munich; 6th Bundesliga title 7th German title
- Relegated: TSV 1860 Munich; FC Schalke 04; Bayer 05 Uerdingen
- European Cup: FC Bayern Munich
- Cup Winners' Cup: Eintracht Frankfurt
- UEFA Cup: Hamburger SV; VfB Stuttgart; 1. FC Kaiserslautern; Borussia Mönchengladbach
- Goals: 1,039
- Average goals/game: 3.4
- Top goalscorer: Karl-Heinz Rummenigge (29)
- Biggest home win: Hamburg 7–1 Schalke 04 (25 October 1980); M'gladbach 7–1 Uerdingen (30 May 1981)
- Biggest away win: Schalke 04 0–6 Bochum (9 May 1981)
- Highest scoring: FC Bayern 7–2 Frankfurt (9 goals) (30 May 1981); Karlsruhe 7–2 1860 (9 goals) (13 June 1981)

The 1980–81 Bundesliga was the 18th season of the Bundesliga, West Germany's premier football league. It began on 15 August 1980 and ended on 13 June 1981. Bayern Munich were the defending champions.

== Competition modus ==
Every team played two games against each other team, one at home and one away. Teams received two points for a win and one point for a draw. If two or more teams were tied on points, places were determined by goal difference and, if still tied, by goals scored. The team with the most points were crowned champions while the three teams with the fewest points were relegated to 2. Bundesliga.

== Team changes to 1979–80 ==
Hertha BSC, SV Werder Bremen and Eintracht Braunschweig were relegated to the 2. Bundesliga after finishing in the last three places. They were replaced by Arminia Bielefeld, winners of the 2. Bundesliga Northern Division, 1. FC Nürnberg, winners of the Southern Division and Karlsruher SC, who won a two-legged promotion play-off against Rot-Weiss Essen.

== Team overview ==
Location of teams in Bundesliga 1980–81

Club	Location	Ground	Capacity
Arminia Bielefeld	Bielefeld	Stadion Alm	35,000
VfL Bochum	Bochum	Ruhrstadion	40,000
Borussia Dortmund	Dortmund	Westfalenstadion	54,000
MSV Duisburg	Duisburg	Wedaustadion	38,500
Fortuna Düsseldorf	Düsseldorf	Rheinstadion	59,600
Eintracht Frankfurt	Frankfurt	Waldstadion	62,000
Hamburger SV	Hamburg	Volksparkstadion	80,000
1. FC Kaiserslautern	Kaiserslautern	Stadion Betzenberg	42,000
Karlsruher SC	Karlsruhe	Wildparkstadion	50,000
1. FC Köln	Cologne	Müngersdorfer Stadion	61,000
Bayer 04 Leverkusen	Leverkusen	Ulrich-Haberland-Stadion	20,000
Borussia Mönchengladbach	Mönchengladbach	Bökelbergstadion	34,500
TSV 1860 Munich	Munich	Stadion an der Grünwalder Straße	31,509
FC Bayern Munich	Munich	Olympiastadion	80,000
1. FC Nürnberg	Nuremberg	Städtisches Stadion	64,238
FC Schalke 04	Gelsenkirchen	Parkstadion	70,000
VfB Stuttgart	Stuttgart	Neckarstadion	72,000
Bayer 05 Uerdingen	Krefeld	Grotenburg-Kampfbahn	28,000

== League table ==
Pos	Team	Pld	W	D	L	GF	GA	GD	Pts	Qualification or relegation
1	Bayern Munich (C)	34	22	9	3	89	41	+48	53	Qualification to European Cup first round
2	Hamburger SV	34	21	7	6	73	43	+30	49	Qualification to UEFA Cup first round (Note: As Eintracht Frankfurt qualified for the Cup Winners' Cup, their UEFA Cup spot was transferred to Mönchengladbach.)
3	VfB Stuttgart	34	19	8	7	70	44	+26	46	Qualification to UEFA Cup first round
4	1. FC Kaiserslautern	34	17	10	7	60	37	+23	44	Qualification to UEFA Cup first round
5	Eintracht Frankfurt	34	13	12	9	61	57	+4	38	Qualification to Cup Winners' Cup first round
6	Borussia Mönchengladbach	34	15	7	12	68	64	+4	37	Qualification to UEFA Cup first round
7	Borussia Dortmund	34	13	9	12	69	59	+10	35	
8	1. FC Köln	34	12	10	12	54	55	−1	34	
9	VfL Bochum	34	9	15	10	53	45	+8	33	
10	Karlsruher SC	34	9	14	11	56	63	−7	32	
11	Bayer Leverkusen	34	10	10	14	52	53	−1	30	
12	MSV Duisburg	34	10	9	15	45	58	−13	29	
13	Fortuna Düsseldorf	34	10	8	16	57	64	−7	28	
14	1. FC Nürnberg	34	11	6	17	47	57	−10	28	
15	Arminia Bielefeld	34	10	6	18	46	65	−19	26	
16	1860 Munich (R)	34	9	7	18	49	67	−18	25	Relegation to 2. Bundesliga
17	Schalke 04 (R)	34	8	7	19	43	88	−45	23	Relegation to 2. Bundesliga
18	Bayer 05 Uerdingen (R)	34	8	6	20	47	79	−32	22	Relegation to 2. Bundesliga

Source: www.dfb.de
Rules for classification: 1) points; 2) goal difference; 3) number of goals scored.
(C) Champions; (R) Relegated

== Results ==
Home \ Away	DSC	BOC	BVB	DUI	F95	SGE	HSV	FCK	KSC	KOE	B04	BMG	M60	FCB	FCN	S04	VFB	B05
Arminia Bielefeld	—	3–3	1–0	2–1	3–0	1–1	0–2	0–1	4–1	2–5	1–1	2–3	3–2	1–2	0–2	1–0	1–0	3–1
VfL Bochum	0–2	—	0–2	1–1	2–1	2–0	0–3	0–0	0–0	1–1	1–1	1–1	4–1	1–3	4–0	5–1	1–1	2–2
Borussia Dortmund	5–0	1–3	—	5–1	2–1	2–1	6–2	2–2	3–3	2–2	5–3	0–3	4–1	2–2	1–0	2–2	3–3	2–1
MSV Duisburg	1–1	0–3	2–1	—	2–1	0–0	2–0	1–1	2–2	3–4	2–4	4–0	1–0	0–1	2–0	5–1	0–3	3–2
Fortuna Düsseldorf	3–1	1–1	2–2	0–1	—	2–2	2–3	0–2	1–2	0–0	4–3	2–1	2–1	3–0	2–2	3–3	3–1	4–2
Eintracht Frankfurt	2–0	2–2	0–4	2–1	2–2	—	1–1	3–2	3–3	4–0	2–0	2–1	2–1	0–0	3–0	5–0	2–1	2–2
Hamburger SV	4–1	2–1	2–1	0–0	2–1	3–1	—	3–2	3–1	2–0	2–0	2–1	4–1	2–2	1–0	7–1	1–3	2–1
1. FC Kaiserslautern	1–3	0–0	1–1	1–1	3–0	2–0	2–2	—	1–0	5–1	3–1	3–2	3–2	4–2	3–1	2–0	1–0	4–2
Karlsruher SC	2–1	0–0	1–1	2–0	3–0	1–1	1–1	1–1	—	1–1	1–1	3–4	7–2	0–3	4–1	3–2	0–0	3–1
1. FC Köln	1–0	2–2	2–1	1–0	1–2	5–0	0–3	2–2	4–0	—	1–1	2–3	4–1	0–3	2–2	0–2	3–1	3–0
Bayer Leverkusen	2–0	2–0	4–1	1–1	2–0	3–2	1–2	0–1	3–0	1–1	—	1–5	1–1	3–0	1–1	4–0	1–1	4–1
Borussia Mönchengladbach	4–2	2–1	1–0	4–1	2–2	2–2	2–2	1–0	3–3	2–0	1–0	—	3–2	1–4	1–4	3–1	1–3	7–1
1860 Munich	2–1	2–2	0–1	1–3	4–3	0–2	0–0	1–1	4–2	2–1	1–0	0–0	—	1–3	2–4	3–1	0–0	4–0
Bayern Munich	5–1	3–1	5–3	5–1	3–2	7–2	2–1	3–0	1–1	1–1	3–0	4–0	1–1	—	4–2	5–1	1–1	4–0
1. FC Nürnberg	2–0	0–2	2–0	1–0	2–1	1–4	2–3	0–4	5–0	2–1	1–1	2–0	1–2	0–1	—	2–0	1–2	0–0
Schalke 04	2–2	0–6	1–2	2–2	0–4	1–4	2–1	0–2	1–0	1–2	3–1	2–2	1–0	2–2	1–1	—	3–2	3–1
VfB Stuttgart	2–1	4–1	3–1	2–0	4–2	1–1	3–2	1–0	5–2	3–0	2–1	4–2	2–1	1–2	2–1	3–0	—	3–2
Bayer Uerdingen	2–2	1–0	2–1	4–1	0–1	4–1	0–3	1–0	0–3	0–1	3–0	2–0	0–3	2–2	3–2	1–3	3–3	—

Source: DFB
Legend: Blue = home team win; Yellow = draw; Red = away team win.

== Top goalscorers ==
29 goals

- (Germany) Karl-Heinz Rummenigge (FC Bayern Munich)

27 goals

- (Germany) Manfred Burgsmüller (Borussia Dortmund)

19 goals

- (Germany) Klaus Allofs (Fortuna Düsseldorf)

17 goals

- (Germany) Paul Breitner (FC Bayern Munich)
- (Germany) Horst Hrubesch (Hamburger SV)
- (Germany) Dieter Müller (1. FC Köln)
- (Germany) Kurt Pinkall (VfL Bochum)

16 goals

- (Germany) Wilfried Hannes (Borussia Mönchengladbach)
- (Norway) Arne Larsen Økland (Bayer 04 Leverkusen)
- (Germany) Gerd-Volker Schock (Arminia Bielefeld)

== Champion squad ==
FC Bayern Munich
Goalkeepers: Walter Junghans (19); Manfred Müller (17).

Defenders: Udo Horsmann (34 / 4); Klaus Augenthaler (33 / 5); Wolfgang Dremmler (33 / 1); Hans Weiner (31 / 1); Einar Jan Aas (Norway) (7).
Midfielders: Bernd Dürnberger (33 / 3); Kurt Niedermayer (32 / 9); Paul Breitner (captain; 30 / 17); Wolfgang Kraus (30 / 6); Jürgen Röber (14); Günter Güttler (1); Pasi Rautiainen (Finland) (1).
Forwards: Karl-Heinz Rummenigge (34 / 29); Dieter Hoeneß (27 / 10); Norbert Janzon (24 / 1); Karl Del'Haye (13 / 1); Reinhold Mathy (3 / 2).
(league appearances and goals listed in brackets)

Manager: Pál Csernai (Hungary) .

On the roster but have not played in a league game: Hans-Georg Schwarzenbeck.
