= Alan & Denise =

British male/female vocal pop duo

Alan & Denise were a British male/female vocal pop duo, consisting of Alan Whittle and his wife Denise.

In April 1983, they scored medium chart success (#43) in the German charts with their single, "Rummenigge". It was a tribute to the German football player Karl-Heinz Rummenigge. Rummenigge, who played for FC Bayern Munich, was at that time at the height of his career.
