= 1979–80 Bundesliga =

17th season of the Bundesliga

Bundesliga
- Season: 1979–80
- Dates: 11 August 1979 – 31 May 1980
- Champions: Bayern Munich; 5th Bundesliga title 6th German title
- Relegated: Hertha BSC; Werder Bremen; Eintracht Braunschweig
- European Cup: FC Bayern Munich
- Cup Winners' Cup: Fortuna Düsseldorf
- UEFA Cup: Hamburger SV; 1. FC Kaiserslautern; VfB Stuttgart; 1. FC Köln; Eintracht Frankfurt
- Goals: 1,023
- Average goals/game: 3.34
- Top goalscorer: Karl-Heinz Rummenigge (26)
- Biggest home win: Köln 8–0 Br'schweig (8 September 1979)
- Biggest away win: Hertha BSC 0–6 Hamburg (5 April 1980)
- Highest scoring: Bremen 4–6 1860 (10 goals) (26 January 1980)

The 1979–80 Bundesliga was the 17th season of the Bundesliga, West Germany's premier football league. It began on 11 August 1979 and ended on 31 May 1980. Hamburger SV were the defending champions.

== Competition modus ==
Every team played two games against each other team, one at home and one away. Teams received two points for a win and one point for a draw. If two or more teams were tied on points, places were determined by goal difference and, if still tied, by goals scored. The team with the most points were crowned champions while the three teams with the fewest points were relegated to their respective 2. Bundesliga divisions.

== Team changes to 1978–79 ==
Arminia Bielefeld, 1. FC Nürnberg and SV Darmstadt 98 were relegated to the 2. Bundesliga after finishing in the last three places. They were replaced by Bayer Leverkusen, winners of the 2. Bundesliga Northern Division, TSV 1860 Munich, winners of the Southern Division and Bayer Uerdingen, who won a two-legged promotion play-off against SpVgg Bayreuth.

== Team overview ==
Location of teams in Bundesliga 1979–80

Club	Location	Ground	Capacity
Hertha BSC Berlin	Berlin	Olympiastadion	100,000
VfL Bochum	Bochum	Ruhrstadion	40,000
Eintracht Braunschweig	Braunschweig	Eintracht-Stadion	38,000
SV Werder Bremen	Bremen	Weserstadion	32,000
Borussia Dortmund	Dortmund	Westfalenstadion	54,000
MSV Duisburg	Duisburg	Wedaustadion	38,500
Fortuna Düsseldorf	Düsseldorf	Rheinstadion	59,600
Eintracht Frankfurt	Frankfurt	Waldstadion	62,000
Hamburger SV	Hamburg	Volksparkstadion	80,000
1. FC Kaiserslautern	Kaiserslautern	Stadion Betzenberg	42,000
1. FC Köln	Cologne	Müngersdorfer Stadion	61,000
Bayer 04 Leverkusen	Leverkusen	Ulrich-Haberland-Stadion	20,000
Borussia Mönchengladbach	Mönchengladbach	Bökelbergstadion	34,500
TSV 1860 Munich	Munich	Stadion an der Grünwalder Straße	31,509
FC Bayern Munich	Munich	Olympiastadion	80,000
FC Schalke 04	Gelsenkirchen	Parkstadion	70,000
VfB Stuttgart	Stuttgart	Neckarstadion	72,000
Bayer 05 Uerdingen	Krefeld	Grotenburg-Kampfbahn	28,000

- ^1 1860 Munich played their first matches in Olympiastadion until renovation at their primary venue had been completed.

== League table ==
Pos	Team	Pld	W	D	L	GF	GA	GD	Pts	Qualification or relegation
1	Bayern Munich (C)	34	22	6	6	84	33	+51	50	Qualification to European Cup first round
2	Hamburger SV	34	20	8	6	86	35	+51	48	Qualification to UEFA Cup first round (Note: Eintracht Frankfurt won the 1979–80 UEFA Cup and thereby automatically qualified as defending champions.)
3	VfB Stuttgart	34	18	5	11	75	53	+22	41	Qualification to UEFA Cup first round
4	1. FC Kaiserslautern	34	17	7	10	75	53	+22	41	Qualification to UEFA Cup first round
5	1. FC Köln	34	14	9	11	72	55	+17	37	Qualification to UEFA Cup first round
6	Borussia Dortmund	34	14	8	12	64	56	+8	36	
7	Borussia Mönchengladbach	34	12	12	10	61	60	+1	36	
8	Schalke 04	34	12	9	13	40	51	−11	33	
9	Eintracht Frankfurt	34	15	2	17	65	61	+4	32	Qualification to UEFA Cup first round
10	VfL Bochum	34	13	6	15	41	44	−3	32	
11	Fortuna Düsseldorf	34	13	6	15	62	72	−10	32	Qualification to Cup Winners' Cup first round
12	Bayer Leverkusen	34	12	8	14	45	61	−16	32	
13	1860 Munich	34	10	10	14	42	53	−11	30	
14	MSV Duisburg	34	11	7	16	43	57	−14	29	
15	Bayer 05 Uerdingen	34	12	5	17	43	61	−18	29	
16	Hertha BSC (R)	34	11	7	16	41	61	−20	29	Relegation to 2. Bundesliga
17	Werder Bremen (R)	34	11	3	20	52	93	−41	25	Relegation to 2. Bundesliga
18	Eintracht Braunschweig (R)	34	6	8	20	32	64	−32	20	Relegation to 2. Bundesliga

Source: www.dfb.de
Rules for classification: 1) points; 2) goal difference; 3) number of goals scored.
(C) Champions; (R) Relegated

== Results ==
Home \ Away	BSC	BOC	EBS	SVW	BVB	DUI	F95	SGE	HSV	FCK	KOE	B04	BMG	M60	FCB	S04	VFB	B05
Hertha BSC	—	1–0	0–0	0–0	3–2	0–1	3–0	1–0	0–6	0–2	1–0	3–0	3–1	1–1	1–1	0–2	4–2	3–0
VfL Bochum	2–1	—	2–1	5–2	2–2	3–0	0–0	1–0	0–3	0–0	2–0	4–2	0–0	2–0	0–1	0–0	0–1	1–0
Eintracht Braunschweig	3–1	3–0	—	1–2	1–0	2–0	2–3	2–3	1–1	0–1	2–1	3–1	0–3	0–0	1–1	1–1	0–2	1–1
Werder Bremen	1–0	2–0	4–0	—	2–1	2–1	4–1	4–3	1–1	2–4	0–5	1–1	4–2	4–6	1–4	4–0	2–3	1–0
Borussia Dortmund	4–1	2–2	2–0	5–0	—	3–1	5–3	0–1	2–2	6–2	3–1	2–1	1–1	0–0	1–0	2–1	2–4	3–1
MSV Duisburg	2–2	0–1	0–0	4–1	1–0	—	0–2	1–0	3–0	1–1	0–2	5–0	3–0	1–0	1–2	1–2	1–1	2–2
Fortuna Düsseldorf	4–0	1–4	3–2	4–1	2–1	1–0	—	1–3	1–1	6–1	3–6	1–1	1–4	4–0	0–3	4–1	6–2	3–1
Eintracht Frankfurt	0–4	0–1	7–2	3–2	0–1	6–0	1–2	—	3–2	3–5	3–0	3–0	5–2	1–1	3–2	3–2	2–0	2–0
Hamburger SV	5–1	3–1	2–0	5–0	4–0	1–2	1–0	5–0	—	1–0	3–0	3–0	3–0	6–1	3–1	4–0	3–2	2–2
1. FC Kaiserslautern	4–0	4–1	2–0	3–1	2–2	4–2	4–0	0–1	4–2	—	2–0	4–0	4–2	3–1	1–1	2–2	2–1	4–0
1. FC Köln	2–2	2–1	8–0	4–1	4–1	2–3	1–1	2–2	2–3	2–0	—	4–0	4–4	2–1	2–4	3–1	2–2	1–0
Bayer Leverkusen	2–1	3–1	3–1	4–0	2–1	2–2	0–0	2–1	2–1	3–1	1–1	—	0–0	1–0	1–0	2–0	1–3	1–1
Borussia Mönchengladbach	4–1	3–2	1–1	2–1	2–2	6–0	2–1	4–1	2–2	0–3	2–2	4–2	—	1–1	2–1	1–1	1–1	3–2
1860 Munich	0–1	1–0	2–0	4–1	0–2	2–1	2–0	2–1	0–2	3–2	1–1	2–2	0–0	—	1–2	3–0	1–1	4–0
Bayern Munich	1–1	3–0	2–1	7–0	4–2	3–1	6–0	2–0	1–1	2–0	1–2	3–1	3–1	6–1	—	3–1	4–0	3–0
Schalke 04	1–0	1–0	1–0	3–0	2–2	1–2	2–2	1–0	1–0	2–1	1–1	0–2	1–0	3–0	1–1	—	0–4	1–2
VfB Stuttgart	5–0	1–3	2–0	5–1	1–2	2–0	5–1	4–2	2–2	3–1	3–0	3–2	4–0	1–1	1–3	0–0	—	2–0
Bayer Uerdingen	3–1	1–0	2–1	2–0	3–0	1–1	3–1	3–2	0–3	3–2	1–3	2–0	0–1	1–0	1–3	1–4	4–2	—

Source: DFB
Legend: Blue = home team win; Yellow = draw; Red = away team win.

== Top goalscorers ==
26 goals

- (Germany) Karl-Heinz Rummenigge (FC Bayern Munich)

21 goals

- (Germany) Horst Hrubesch (Hamburger SV)
- (Germany) Dieter Müller (1. FC Köln)

20 goals

- (Germany) Manfred Burgsmüller (Borussia Dortmund)
- (Germany) Harald Nickel (Borussia Mönchengladbach)

17 goals

- (Germany) Reiner Geye (1. FC Kaiserslautern)

16 goals

- (Germany) Klaus Allofs (Fortuna Düsseldorf)
- (Germany) Dieter Hoeneß (FC Bayern Munich)

14 goals

- (Germany) Hansi Müller (VfB Stuttgart)
- (Germany) Friedhelm Funkel (Bayer Uerdingen)

== Champion squad ==
FC Bayern Munich
Goalkeepers: Walter Junghans (29); Manfred Müller (5).

Defenders: Udo Horsmann (34 / 5); Klaus Augenthaler (34 / 2); Hans Weiner (34 / 1); Kurt Niedermayer (29 / 10); Einar Jan Aas (Norway) (6 / 1); Peter Gruber (3); Hans-Georg Schwarzenbeck (2).
Midfielders: Paul Breitner (32 / 10); Bernd Dürnberger (31 / 3); Wolfgang Dremmler (26); Wolfgang Kraus (22 / 1); Branko Oblak (Socialist Federal Republic of Yugoslavia) (20 / 1).
Forwards: Karl-Heinz Rummenigge (34 / 26); Dieter Hoeneß (32 / 16); Norbert Janzon (28 / 7); Wilhelm Reisinger (4).
(league appearances and goals listed in brackets)

Manager: Pál Csernai (Hungary) .

On the roster but have not played in a league game: Sepp Maier.
