= Dietmar Demuth =

German former footballer

Personal information
- Date of birth: 14 January 1955 (age 71)
- Place of birth: Querfurt, Bezirk Halle, East Germany
- Height: 1.85 m (6 ft 1 in)
- Position: Central defender

Youth career
- 1963–1967: TuS Osdorf
- 1967–1974: FC St. Pauli

Senior career*
Years	Team	Apps	(Gls)
1974–1979	FC St. Pauli	147	(18)
1979–1983	Bayer Leverkusen	92	(14)
1983–1984	Kickers Offenbach	15	(0)
1984–1988	FC St. Pauli	79	(5)
Total		333	(37)

Managerial career
- 1990–1992: FC St. Pauli II
- 1993–1995: SV Lurup
- 1999: FC St. Pauli
- 2000–2002: FC St. Pauli
- 2003–2004: Ashanti Gold SC
- 2005: Chemnitzer FC
- 2006–2007: Eintracht Braunschweig (assistant)
- 2007: Eintracht Braunschweig (caretaker)
- 2007–2012: SV Babelsberg 03
- 2013: FC Bergedorf
- 2014: Berliner AK
- 2014–2015: ZFC Meuselwitz
- 2016–2018: BSG Chemie Leipzig
- * Club domestic league appearances and goals

Dietmar Demuth (born 14 January 1955) is a German former football player and manager. From 2016, he was the manager of BSG Chemie Leipzig.
