= Norbert Janzon =

German footballer and manager

Personal information
- Date of birth: 21 December 1950 (age 75)
- Place of birth: West Berlin, West Germany
- Position: Striker

Senior career*
Years	Team	Apps	(Gls)
1969–1971	Hertha BSC	0	(0)
1971–1974	Wormatia Worms	82	(48)
1974–1976	Kickers Offenbach	61	(21)
1976–1977	Karlsruher SC	34	(16)
1977–1981	FC Bayern Munich	84	(20)
1981–1983	FC Schalke 04	58	(15)
1983–1985	TSV Ampfing		

International career
1975	West Germany B	1	(0)

Managerial career
- 1989: TSV Ampfing
- 1990–1993: FC Deisenhofen
- 1993–1994: SpVgg Unterhaching II
- 1996–1998: TSV 1877 Ebersberg
- * Club domestic league appearances and goals

Norbert Janzon (born 21 December 1950) is a retired German footballer. He spent ten seasons in the Bundesliga with Hertha BSC, Kickers Offenbach, Karlsruher SC, FC Bayern Munich and FC Schalke 04.

== Honours ==
- Bundesliga champion: 1979–80, 1980–81
