= Kurt Niedermayer =

German former footballer, now a coach (born 1955)

Personal information
- Full name: Kurt Niedermayer
- Date of birth: 25 November 1955 (age 70)
- Place of birth: Reilingen, West Germany
- Positions: Defender; midfielder

Youth career
- 1963–1971: SC Reilingen
- 1971–1974: Karlsruher SC

Senior career*
Years	Team	Apps	(Gls)
1974–1977	Karlsruher SC	30	(3)
1977–1982	FC Bayern Munich	145	(32)
1982–1985	VfB Stuttgart	73	(7)
1985–1987	FC Locarno		
1987–1988	SC Pfullendorf		

International career
1972	West Germany Youth	5	(2)
1979–1980	West Germany B	3	(0)
1980	West Germany	1	(0)

Managerial career
- 1992–2000: SV Wacker Burghausen
- * Club domestic league appearances and goals

Kurt Niedermayer (born 25 November 1955 in Reilingen) is a German former footballer, now a coach. Niedermayer, who played in defence or midfield, played for Karlsruher SC, FC Bayern Munich, VfB Stuttgart, FC Locarno and SC Pfullendorf. He won one cap for West Germany in 1980. He managed SV Wacker Burghausen from 1992 until 2000 and was later a youth coach at Bayern Munich.

== Honours ==
- Bundesliga: 1979–80, 1980–81, 1983–84
- DFB-Pokal: 1981–82
