= Klaus Augenthaler =

German football player and manager

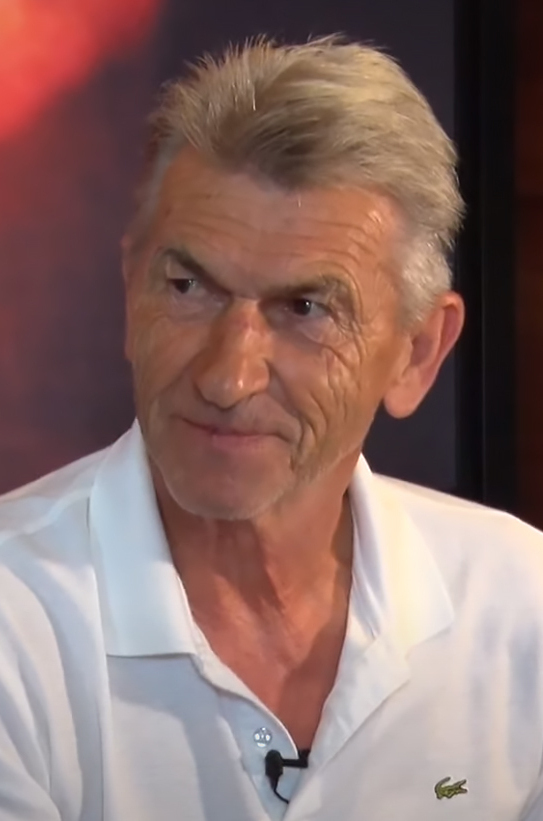
- Augenthaler in 2021

Personal information
- Full name: Klaus Augenthaler
- Date of birth: 26 September 1957 (age 69)
- Place of birth: Fürstenzell, West Germany
- Height: 1.82 m (6 ft 0 in)
- Positions: Sweeper; centre-back

Youth career
- 1964–1975: FC Vilshofen
- 1975–1976: Bayern Munich

Senior career*
| Years | Team | Apps | (Gls) |
| 1976–1991 | Bayern Munich | 404 | (52) |

International career
| 1975–1976 | West Germany Youth | 11 | (3) |
| 1979–1981 | West Germany B | 8 | (1) |
| 1983–1990 | West Germany | 27 | (0) |

Managerial career
- 1991–1992: Bayern Munich (youth team)
- 1992–1997: Bayern Munich (assistant)
- 1996: Bayern Munich (caretaker)
- 1997–2000: Grazer AK
- 2000–2003: 1. FC Nürnberg
- 2003–2005: Bayer Leverkusen
- 2005–2007: VfL Wolfsburg
- 2010–2011: SpVgg Unterhaching
Medal record
Men's football
Representing West Germany
FIFA World Cup
| Winner | 1990 Italy |
| Runner-up | 1986 Mexico |
- * Club domestic league appearances and goals

Klaus "Auge" Augenthaler (born 26 September 1957) is a German former professional football player and manager. A defender, he won seven Bundesliga titles in his 15-year club career with Bayern Munich. He also represented the West Germany national team, winning the FIFA World Cup in 1990.

In 2005, Augenthaler was named as a member of the greatest Bayern Munich XI in the club's history.

== Club career ==
Augenthaler was born in Fürstenzell, Bavaria, West Germany. He played generally in the position of centre-back or, especially in the later part of his career, as a sweeper.

Augenthaler joined Bayern Munich in 1975 and made his Bundesliga debut for the club in 1977, scoring in a 3-0 win over Borussia Dortmund. He won the Bundesliga for the first time in 1980, and Bayern retained the title in 1981. Augenthaler played for Bayern in 1982 European Cup final against Aston Villa and came close to scoring twice, but Bayern ultimately lost 1-0, becoming the first ever Bayern team to lose a final.

In 1984 Augenthaler became Bayern captain, which he would remain until his retirement in 1991. Bayern won the league again in his first season as captain and Augenthaler, playing as a libero, was one of the league's best defensive players in a Bayern defence that conceded fewer than any other team.

In November 1985 Augenthaler committed one of the most infamous fouls in Bundesliga history, injuring Werder Bremen's star player Rudi Völler with a tackle which badly injured Völler and forced him to miss almost the entire remainder of the season. Augenthaler received death threats from Bremen fans after the incident and was booed by fans of other clubs around the country.

Bayern lost another European Cup final in 1986–87, though Augenthaler was suspended for the final after being sent off for a slap on Hugo Sánchez in the semi-final.

In 1989, Augenthaler scored a shot from the halfway line against Eintracht Frankfurt goalkeeper Uli Stein; it was awarded Sportschau's goal of the year award, and was later named the goal of the century.

During his final season with Bayern, Augenthaler scored a last-minute own goal in the 1990–91 European Cup semi-final against Red Star Belgrade which knocked Bayern out.

In his years with Bayern Munich, Augenthaler won the Bundesliga title seven times and the DFB-Pokal three times. He played 404 Bundesliga matches and made 89 appearances in European cup competitions for Bayern.

== International career ==
Between 1983 and 1990, he played 27 times for West Germany, with which he won the World Cup 1990 in Italy in the final against Argentina (1–0). He was also part of the squad that reached the final of the 1986 World Cup.

== Managerial career ==
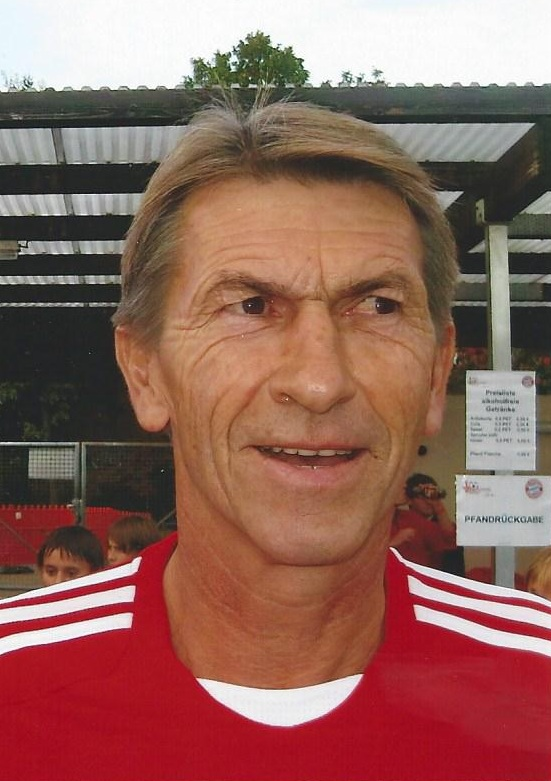
Augenthaler in 2009

Augenthaler's managerial career started as assistant coach with Bayern Munich, serving under coaches Søren Lerby, Erich Ribbeck, Franz Beckenbauer, Giovanni Trapattoni and Otto Rehhagel. He managed the last match of the 1995–96 season against Fortuna Düsseldorf. From there he moved to become head coach of Austrian side Grazer AK from 1997 to 2000, taking them to two third placings.

In the winter break of 1999–2000, Augenthaler left Graz and took over 1. FC Nürnberg on 2 March 2000, then in the second division, leading them to promotion.

On 29 April 2003, Nürnberg sacked Augenthaler, as the club was facing relegation. He took over the reins at Bayer 04 Leverkusen in May 2003. He managed to save the club from relegation and stayed on there until September 2005.

In December of that same year, he was hired by VfL Wolfsburg. His undistinguished time there ended shortly before the end of the season 2006–07. On 23 March 2010, he signed a half-year contract with SpVgg Unterhaching and replaced Matthias Lust. His contract was terminated on 3 June 2011.

Augenthaler rejected contract offers from China and Turkey due to a lack of interest. He applied to become the new head coach of 1860 Munich in 2015.

== Coaching record ==
As of 18 January 2014

| Team | From | To | Record | | | | | |
| Team | From | To | G | W | D | L | Win % | Ref. |
|---|---|---|---|---|---|---|---|---|
| Bayern Munich | 18 May 1996 | 30 June 1996 | 1 | 0 | 1 | 0 | 0.00 | |
| Grazer AK | 1 July 1997 | 1 March 2000 | 111 | 55 | 19 | 37 | 49.55 | |
| 1. FC Nürnberg | 2 March 2000 | 29 April 2003 | 119 | 49 | 20 | 50 | 41.18 | |
| Bayer Leverkusen | 13 May 2003 | 16 September 2005 | 94 | 46 | 21 | 27 | 48.94 | |
| VfL Wolfsburg | 28 December 2005 | 19 May 2007 | 56 | 15 | 20 | 21 | 26.79 | |
| SpVgg Unterhaching | 23 March 2010 | 3 June 2011 | 49 | 16 | 16 | 17 | 32.65 | |
| Total | | | 430 | 181 | 97 | 152 | 42.09 | — |

== Honours ==
=== Player ===
Bayern Munich

- Bundesliga: 1979–80, 1980–81, 1984–85, 1985–86, 1986–87, 1988–89, 1989–90
- DFB-Pokal: 1981–82, 1983–84, 1985–86
- DFB-Supercup: 1987, 1990
- Länderpokal: 1977
- European Cup runner-up: 1982, 1987

Germany

- FIFA World Cup: 1990, runner-up 1986

Individual

- kicker Bundesliga Team of the Season: 1984–85, 1988–89
- Goal of the Year (Germany): 1989
- Goal of the Decade (Germany)
- Bayern Munich All-Time XI

=== Manager ===
Grazer AK

- Austrian Cup: 1999–2000

1. FC Nürnberg

- 2. Bundesliga: 2000–01

== See also ==
- List of one-club men
