= 1986–87 FC Bayern Munich season =

87th season in existence of Bayern Munich

FC Bayern Munich
1986–87 season
- Manager: Udo Lattek
- Stadium: Olympiastadion
- Bundesliga: Winners
- DFB-Pokal: Third round
- European Cup: Runners-up
- Top goalscorer: League: Lothar Matthäus (14); All: Lothar Matthäus (19)
Home colours	Away colours

The 1986–87 FC Bayern Munich season was the 87th season in the club's history and 22nd season since promotion from Regionalliga Süd in 1965. Bayern Munich won its ninth Bundesliga title. This title marked a third consecutive championship for the club. The club reached the third round of the DFB-Pokal and finished as runner-up of the European Cup. The Bundesliga campaign ended with only one loss with no away losses. This feat set two Bundesliga records that were not repeated until the 2012–13 season. This season was the final season under manager Udo Lattek.

== Results ==
=== Friendlies ===
==== Casio-Cup ====
Semifinals	Borussia Mönchengladbach	2–5	Bayern Munich	Mönchengladbach

Final	SV Werder Bremen	2–2 (3 – 4 p)	Bayern Munich	Mönchengladbach

=== Bundesliga ===
9 August 1986 1	Bayern Munich	2–2	Borussia Dortmund	Munich
15:30 CEST	Wohlfarth 1'; Matthäus 50'	Report	Simmes 30'; Zorc 70'	Stadium: Olympiastadion; Attendance: 31,000; Referee: Peter Gabor

16 August 1986 2	Fortuna Düsseldorf	0–3	Bayern Munich	Düsseldorf
15:30 CEST		Report	Mathy 68', 89'; Brehme 77'	Stadium: Rheinstadion; Attendance: 27,000; Referee: Hans-Heinrich Barnick

23 August 1986 3	Bayern Munich	3–0	1. FC Köln	Munich
15:30 CEST	Pflügler 13'; Wohlfarth 31', 65'	Report		Stadium: Olympiastadion; Attendance: 39,000; Referee: Gerhard Theobald

3 September 1986 4	1. FC Nürnberg	1–2	Bayern Munich	Nuremberg
20:00 CEST	Philipkowski 32'	Report	Matthäus 47' (pen.); Augenthaler 57'	Stadium: Städtisches Stadion; Attendance: 56,000; Referee: Karl-Heinz Tritschler

6 September 1986 5	Bayern Munich	3–1	Hamburger SV	Munich
15:30 CEST	Matthäus 5'; Rummenigge 45'; Brehme 70'	Report	Plessers 20'	Stadium: Olympiastadion; Attendance: 51,000; Referee: Dieter Pauly

13 September 1986 6	1. FC Kaiserslautern	1–1	Bayern Munich	Kaiserslautern
15:30 CEST	Roos 64'	Report	Rummenigge 36'	Stadium: Fritz-Walter-Stadion; Attendance: 36,104; Referee: Karl-Josef Assenmacher

20 September 1986 7	Bayern Munich	3–1	Borussia Mönchengladbach	Munich
15:30 CEST	Pflügler 45'; Matthäus 55'; Wohlfarth 58'	Report	Rahn 68'	Stadium: Olympiastadion; Attendance: 64,000; Referee: Hans-Joachim Osmers

27 September 1986 8	SV Werder Bremen	1–1	Bayern Munich	Bremen
15:30 CEST	Völler 27'	Report	Pflügler 75'	Stadium: Weserstadion; Attendance: 37,800; Referee: Werner Föckler

4 October 1986 9	Bayern Munich	3–2	VfL Bochum	Munich
15:30 CET	Rummenigge 23'; Pflügler 24'; Wohlfarth 60'	Report	Lameck 44' (pen.); Schulz 87'	Stadium: Olympiastadion; Attendance: 40,000; Referee: Bodo Kriegelstein

11 October 1986 10	Eintracht Frankfurt	0–0	Bayern Munich	Frankfurt
15:30 CET		Report		Stadium: Waldstadion; Attendance: 58,000; Referee: Manfred Neuner

18 October 1986 11	SpVgg Blau-Weiß 1890 Berlin	1–1	Bayern Munich	Berlin
15:30 CET	Feilzer 85'	Report	Augenthaler 2'	Stadium: Olympic Stadium (Berlin); Attendance: 43,710; Referee: Bernd Kruse

1 November 1986 12	Bayern Munich	0–3	Bayer Leverkusen	Munich
15:30 CET		Report	Götz 13', 87'; Hausmann 79'	Stadium: Olympiastadion; Attendance: 47,000; Referee: Wolf-Günter Wiesel

8 November 1986 13	SV Waldhof Mannheim	3–3	Bayern Munich	Ludwigshafen
15:30 CET	Gaudino 19'; Walter 44'; Scholz 70'	Report	Hoeneß 69', 73'; Brehme 90+1'	Stadium: Südweststadion; Attendance: 28,500; Referee: Heinz Werner

15 November 1986 14	Bayern Munich	3–0	FC 08 Homburg	Munich
15:30 CET	Matthäus 10' (pen.); Wohlfarth 40'; Nachtweih 83'	Report		Stadium: Olympiastadion; Attendance: 24,000; Referee: Klaus Broska

22 November 1986 15	Bayer 05 Uerdingen	0–0	Bayern Munich	Krefeld
15:30 CET		Report		Stadium: Grotenburg-Stadion; Attendance: 25,000; Referee: Wilfried Heitmann

29 November 1986 16	Bayern Munich	1–0	VfB Stuttgart	Munich
15:30 CET	Flick 14'	Report		Stadium: Olympiastadion; Attendance: 45,000; Referee: Joachim Kautschor

6 December 1986 17	FC Schalke 04	2–2	Bayern Munich	Gelsenkirchen
15:30 CET	Hannes 23'; Täuber 47'	Report	Matthäus 48'; Augenthaler 82'	Stadium: Parkstadion; Attendance: 67,500; Referee: Peter Gabor

21 February 1987 18	Borussia Dortmund	2–2	Bayern Munich	Dortmund
15:30 CET	Dickel 75'; Zorc 90+2'	Report	Wohlfarth 27', 33'	Stadium: Westfalenstadion; Attendance: 50,000; Referee: Wolf-Günter Wiesel

28 February 1987 19	Bayern Munich	3–0	Fortuna Düsseldorf	Munich
15:30 CET	Matthäus 53'; Pflügler 58'; Hoeneß 64'	Report		Stadium: Olympiastadion; Attendance: 13,000; Referee: Kurt Witke

14 March 1987 20	1. FC Köln	1–1	Bayern Munich	Cologne
15:30 CET	Woodcock 38'	Report	Augenthaler 68'	Stadium: Müngersdorfer Stadion; Attendance: 52,000; Referee: Wilfried Heitmann

21 March 1987 21	Bayern Munich	4–0	1. FC Nürnberg	Munich
15:30 CET	Rummenigge 9'; Wohlfarth 56'; Hoeneß 62'; Matthäus 81'	Report		Stadium: Olympiastadion; Attendance: 75,000; Referee: Wolf-Dieter Ahlenfelder

28 March 1987 22	Hamburger SV	1–2	Bayern Munich	Hamburg
15:30 CET	Kastl 81'	Report	Lunde 26'; Rummenigge 87'	Stadium: Volksparkstadion; Attendance: 61,418; Referee: Dieter Pauly

4 April 1987 23	Bayern Munich	3–0	1. FC Kaiserslautern	Munich
15:30 CEST	Hoeneß 18'; Lunde 38'; Hans Dorfner 79'	Report		Stadium: Olympiastadion; Attendance: 28,000; Referee: Hans-Jürgen Weber

11 April 1987 24	Borussia Mönchengladbach	0–1	Bayern Munich	Mönchengladbach
15:30 CEST		Report	Hoeneß 35'	Stadium: Bökelbergstadion; Attendance: 33,000; Referee: Gerd Zimmermann

15 April 1987 25	Bayern Munich	3–2	SV Werder Bremen	Munich
20:00 CEST	Rummenigge 34'; Pflügler 49'; Matthäus 56'	Report	Völler 14'; Wolter 43'	Stadium: Olympiastadion; Attendance: 37,000; Referee: Hans-Peter Dellwing

25 April 1987 26	VfL Bochum	1–2	Bayern Munich	Bochum
15:30 CEST	Leifeld 15'	Report	Brehme 17'; Matthäus 62'	Stadium: Ruhrstadion; Attendance: 35,000; Referee: Hans-Joachim Osmers

12 May 1987 27	Bayern Munich	2–1	Eintracht Frankfurt	Munich
20:00 CEST	Nachtweih 10'; Rummenigge 51'	Report	Turowski 60'	Stadium: Olympiastadion; Attendance: 14,000; Referee: Hans-Peter Schäfer

9 May 1987 28	Bayern Munich	2–0	SpVgg Blau-Weiß 1890 Berlin	Munich
15:30 CEST	Wohlfarth 57'; Eder 61'	Report		Stadium: Olympiastadion; Attendance: 31,000; Referee: Hellmut Krug

16 May 1987 29	Bayer Leverkusen	0–0	Bayern Munich	Leverkusen
15:30 CEST		Report		Stadium: Ulrich-Haberland-Stadion; Attendance: 21,000; Referee: Gerhard Theobald

23 May 1987 30	Bayern Munich	3–0	SV Waldhof Mannheim	Munich
15:30 CEST	Wohlfarth 35'; Pflügler 58'; Matthäus 70' (pen.)	Report		Stadium: Olympiastadion; Attendance: 17,000; Referee: Hans Puchalski

30 May 1987 31	FC 08 Homburg	2–2	Bayern Munich	Homburg
15:30 CEST	Müller 58'; Freiler 64'	Report	Rummenigge 19'; Kögl 32'	Stadium: Waldstadion Homburg; Attendance: 16,000; Referee: Wolfgang Mierswa

6 June 1987 32	Bayern Munich	2–2	Bayer 05 Uerdingen	Munich
15:30 CEST	Matthäus 11' (pen.); Hoeneß 67'	Report	Klinger 21'; Eðvaldsson 39'	Stadium: Olympiastadion; Attendance: 22,000; Referee: Norbert Brückner

13 June 1987 33	VfB Stuttgart	1–3	Bayern Munich	Stuttgart
15:30 CEST	Klinsmann 59'	Report	Matthäus 31', 48' (pen.); Kögl 38'	Stadium: Neckarstadion; Attendance: 40,000; Referee: Wolf-Günter Wiesel

17 June 1987 34	Bayern Munich	1–0	FC Schalke 04	Munich
15:30 CEST	Nachtweih 88'	Report		Stadium: Olympiastadion; Attendance: 59,000; Referee: Wilfried Heitmann

==== Results by round ====
Round	1	2	3	4	5	6	7	8	9	10	11	12	13	14	15	16	17	18	19	20	21	22	23	24	25	26	27	28	29	30	31	32	33	34
Ground	H	A	H	A	H	A	H	A	H	A	A	H	A	H	A	H	A	A	H	A	H	A	H	A	H	A	H	H	A	H	A	H	A	H
Result	D	W	W	W	W	D	W	D	W	D	D	L	D	W	D	W	D	D	W	D	W	W	W	W	W	W	W	W	D	W	D	D	W	W
Position	8	4	2	3	2	1	1	1	1	1	1	3	2	2	2	1	2	2	1	1	1	1	1	1	1	1	1	1	1	1	1	1	1	1

A = Away; H = Home; W = Win; D = Draw; L = Loss

==== League standings ====
Pos	Team	Pld	W	D	L	GF	GA	GD	Pts	Qualification or relegation
1	Bayern Munich (C)	34	20	13	1	67	31	+36	53	Qualification to European Cup first round
2	Hamburger SV	34	19	9	6	69	37	+32	47	Qualification to Cup Winners' Cup first round
3	Borussia Mönchengladbach	34	18	7	9	74	44	+30	43	Qualification to UEFA Cup first round (Note: As Hamburger SV qualified for the Cup Winners' Cup, their UEFA Cup spot was transferred to Leverkusen.)
4	Borussia Dortmund	34	15	10	9	70	50	+20	40	Qualification to UEFA Cup first round
5	Werder Bremen	34	17	6	11	65	54	+11	40	Qualification to UEFA Cup first round

Source: www.dfb.de
Rules for classification: 1) points; 2) goal difference; 3) number of goals scored.
(C) Champions

=== DFB Pokal ===
30 August 1986 1st Round	Hertha BSC	1–2	Bayern Munich	Berlin
18:00 CEST	Loontiens 4'	Report	Mathy 22'; Wohlfarth 89'	Stadium: Olympic Stadium (Berlin); Attendance: 15,000; Referee: Wolfgang Mierswa

24 October 1986 2nd Round	FC 08 Homburg	1–3	Bayern Munich	Homburg
	Buncol 17'	Report	Wohlfarth 7', 14'; Matthäus 73'	Stadium: Waldstadion Homburg; Attendance: 13,000; Referee: Wolf-Rüdiger Umbach

18 November 1986 3rd Round	Fortuna Düsseldorf	3–0	Bayern Munich	Düsseldorf
	Dusend 70'; Preetz 88'; Bockenfeld 90'	Report		Stadium: Rheinstadion; Attendance: 45,000; Referee: Gerhard Theobald

=== European Cup ===
==== 1st round ====
17 September 1986 1st leg	PSV Eindhoven (Netherlands)	0–2	(Germany) Bayern Munich	Eindhoven, Netherlands
			Mathy 79', 89'	Stadium: Philips Stadion; Attendance: 26,000; Referee: Robert Valentine (Scotland)

1 October 1986 2nd leg	Bayern Munich (Germany)	0–0 (2–0 agg.)	(Netherlands) PSV Eindhoven	Munich, West Germany
				Stadium: Olympiastadion; Attendance: 32,000; Referee: Michel Vautrot (France)

==== 2nd round ====
22 October 1986 1st leg	Bayern Munich (Germany)	2–0	FK Austria Wien	Munich, West Germany
	Flick 44'; Matthäus 73' (pen.)			Stadium: Olympiastadion; Attendance: 48,000; Referee: Vojtech Christov (Czechoslovakia)

5 November 1986 2nd leg	FK Austria Wien	1–1 (1–3 agg.)	(Germany) Bayern Munich	Vienna, Austria
	Polster 58'		Wohlfarth 34'	Stadium: Praterstadion; Attendance: 47,000; Referee: Alexis Ponnet (Belgium)

==== Quarter-finals ====
4 March 1987 1st leg	Bayern Munich (Germany)	5–0	(Belgium) R.S.C. Anderlecht	Munich, West Germany
	Rummenigge 15'; Pflügler 28'; Hoeneß 69', 86'; Wohlfarth 89'			Stadium: Olympiastadion; Attendance: 16,000; Referee: Victoriano Sanchez Arminio (Spain)

18 March 1987 2nd leg	R.S.C. Anderlecht (Belgium)	2–2 (2–7 agg.)	(Germany) Bayern Munich	Anderlecht, Belgium
	Lozano 32'; Nilis 73'		Wohlfarth 56'; Matthäus 88'	Stadium: Constant Vanden Stock Stadium; Attendance: 35,000; Referee: Ronald Bridges (Wales)

==== Semi-finals ====
8 April 1987 1st leg	Bayern Munich (Germany)	4–1	(Spain) Real Madrid C.F.	Munich, West Germany
	Augenthaler 11'; Matthäus 30' (pen.), 52' (pen.); Wohlfarth 36'		Butragueño 45'	Stadium: Olympiastadion; Attendance: 75,000; Referee: Robert B. Valentine (Scotland)

22 April 1987 2nd leg	Real Madrid C.F. (Spain)	1–0 (2–4 agg.)	(Germany) Bayern Munich	Madrid, Spain
	Augenthaler 27' (o.g.)			Stadium: Santiago Bernabéu Stadium; Attendance: 103,000; Referee: Michel Vautrot (France)

==== Final ====
27 May 1987	Bayern Munich (Germany)	1–2	(Portugal) FC Porto	Vienna, Austria
	Kögl 25'		Madjer 78'; Juary 80'	Stadium: Praterstadion; Attendance: 62,000; Referee: Alexis Ponnet (Belgium)

== Team statistics ==
Competition	First match	Last match	Record							
Competition	First match	Last match	G	W	D	L	GF	GA	GD	Win %
Bundesliga	9 August 1986	17 June 1987	34	20	13	1	67	31	+36	58.82
DFB-Pokal	30 August 1986	18 November 1986	3	2	0	1	5	5	+0	66.67
European Cup	17 September 1986	27 May 1987	9	4	3	2	17	7	+10	44.44
Total			46	26	16	4	89	43	+46	56.52

== Players ==
=== Squad, appearances and goals ===
No.	Pos	Nat	Player	Total		Bundesliga		DFB-Pokal		European Cup	
No.	Pos	Nat	Player	Apps	Goals	Apps	Goals	Apps	Goals	Apps	Goals
	GK	(Belgium) BEL	Jean-Marie Pfaff	45	0	34+0	0	2+0	0	9+0	0
	GK	(Belgium) BEL	Robert Dekeyser	1	0	0+0	0	1+0	0	0+0	0
	DF	(West Germany) FRG	Hans Pflügler	44	8	32+0	7	3+0	0	9+0	1
	DF	(West Germany) FRG	Norbert Eder	44	1	32+0	1	3+0	0	9+0	0
	DF	(West Germany) FRG	Andreas Brehme	41	4	31+0	4	2+0	0	8+0	0
	DF	(West Germany) FRG	Klaus Augenthaler (captain)	33	5	25+0	4	2+0	0	6+0	1
	DF	(West Germany) FRG	Uli Bayerschmidt	2	0	0+1	0	0+0	0	0+1	0
	MF	(East Germany) GDR	Norbert Nachtweih	45	3	33+0	3	3+0	0	9+0	0
	MF	(West Germany) FRG	Lothar Matthäus	41	19	31+0	14	3+0	1	7+0	4
	MF	(West Germany) FRG	Hansi Flick	26	2	12+7	1	2+0	0	5+0	1
	MF	(West Germany) FRG	Helmut Winklhofer	23	0	12+5	0	0+1	0	3+2	0
	MF	(West Germany) FRG	Hans Dorfner	22	1	14+3	1	1+0	0	4+0	0
	MF	(West Germany) FRG	Holger Willmer	12	0	5+4	0	0+0	0	2+1	0
	FW	(West Germany) FRG	Michael Rummenigge	42	9	31+0	8	3+0	0	8+0	1
	FW	(West Germany) FRG	Roland Wohlfarth	38	18	26+1	11	3+0	3	8+0	4
	FW	(West Germany) FRG	Dieter Hoeneß	34	9	23+3	7	2+0	0	5+1	2
	FW	(Denmark) DEN	Lars Lunde	28	2	12+9	2	2+0	0	2+3	0
	FW	(West Germany) FRG	Ludwig Kögl	27	3	12+9	2	0+1	0	2+3	1
	FW	(West Germany) FRG	Reinhold Mathy	15	5	9+2	2	1+0	1	3+0	2
Players sold or loaned out after the start of the season:
	FW	(West Germany) FRG	Frank Hartmann	1	0	0+1	0	0+0	0	0+0	0

=== Bookings ===
No.	Player	Bundesliga			DFB-Pokal			European Cup			Total		
No.	Player	Booked	(yellow card) (red card)	Sent off (straight red)	Booked	(yellow card) (red card)	Sent off (straight red)	Booked	(yellow card) (red card)	Sent off (straight red)	Booked	(yellow card) (red card)	Sent off (straight red)
	Lothar Matthäus	5	0	0	0	0	0	3	0	0	8	0	0
	Norbert Nachtweih	6	0	0	2	0	0	0	0	0	8	0	0
	Andreas Brehme	5	0	0	1	0	0	1	0	0	7	0	0
	Klaus Augenthaler	3	0	0	1	0	0	1	0	1	5	0	1
	Hansi Flick	4	0	0	0	0	0	0	0	0	4	0	0
	Hans Pflügler	4	0	0	0	0	0	0	0	0	4	0	0
	Hans Dorfner	2	0	0	1	0	0	0	0	0	3	0	0
	Jean-Marie Pfaff	2	0	0	0	0	0	1	0	0	3	0	0
	Helmut Winklhofer	2	0	0	0	0	0	1	0	0	3	0	0
	Reinhold Mathy	1	0	0	1	0	0	0	0	0	2	0	0
	Michael Rummenigge	1	0	0	0	0	0	1	0	0	2	0	0
	Norbert Eder	1	0	1	0	0	0	0	0	0	1	0	1
	Lars Lunde	1	0	0	0	0	0	0	0	0	1	0	0
	Roland Wohlfarth	1	0	0	0	0	0	0	0	0	1	0	0
Totals		38	0	1	6	0	0	8	0	1	52	0	2

== Transfers ==
=== In ===
No.	Pos.	Nat.	Name	Age	EU	Moving from	Type	Transfer window	Ends	Transfer fee	Source
	DF	(West Germany)	Andreas Brehme	25	EU	1. FC Kaiserslautern	Transfer	Summer		€ 1 Million	
	GK	(Belgium)	Robert Dekeyser	21	EU	Union Saint-Gilloise (Belgium)	Transfer	Summer		Free	
	FW	(Denmark)	Lars Lunde	22	EU	Young Boys (Switzerland)	Transfer	Summer		Undisclosed	
	MF	(West Germany)	Hans Dorfner	20	EU	1. FC Nürnberg	Transfer	Summer		€ 1 Million	
	DF	(West Germany)	Uli Bayerschmidt	19	EU	Youth system	Transfer	Summer		Promoted	

=== Out ===
No.	Pos.	Nat.	Name	Age	EU	Moving to	Type	Transfer window	Transfer fee	Source
	FW	(West Germany)	Frank Hartmann	25	EU	Hannover 96	Transfer	Summer	Undisclosed	
	MF	(West Germany)	Manfred Schwabl	20	EU	1. FC Nürnberg	Transfer	Summer	€200,000	
	DF	(West Germany)	Bertram Beierlorzer	29	EU	VfB Stuttgart	Transfer	Summer	Undisclosed	
	MF	(Turkey)	Uğur Tütüneker	22	Non-EU	Galatasaray (Turkey)	Transfer	Summer	Undisclosed	
	MF	(Denmark)	Søren Lerby	28	EU	Monaco (France)	Transfer	Summer	Undisclosed	
	DF	(West Germany)	Wolfgang Dremmler	31	EU		End of career	Summer	N/A	
	DF	(West Germany)	Wolfgang Grobe	30	EU		End of career	Summer	N/A	

== Team kits ==
Home	Away	EC Final
