= 1985–86 FC Bayern Munich season =

86th season in existence of Bayern Munich

FC Bayern Munich
1985–86 season
- Manager: Udo Lattek
- Bundesliga: 1st
- European Cup: Quarterfinals
- DFB-Pokal: Winners
- Top goalscorer: League: Dieter Hoeneß (15); All: Dieter Hoeneß (19)
Home colours	Away colours

The 1985–86 FC Bayern Munich season was the 86th season in the club's history and 21st season since promotion from Regionalliga Süd in 1965. Bayern Munich won its eighth Bundesliga title. This title marked a back-to-back championship for the club. The club also won the DFB-Pokal and reached the quarterfinals of the European Cup This season, Frank Hartmann, Hansi Flick, and Helmut Winklhofer transferred to the club while Manfred Schwabl was promoted from the Junior Team.

== Results ==
=== Friendlies ===
==== Santiago Bernabéu Cup ====
29 August 1985 Final	Real Madrid C.F.	4–2	Bayern Munich	Madrid, Spain
	Sánchez 47' (pen.); Butragueño 66'; Santillana 70'; Valdano 79'		Lerby 14'; Matthäus 38'	Stadium: Santiago Bernabéu Stadium; Referee: Ramos Marco (Spain)

=== Bundesliga ===
==== League fixtures and results ====
10 August 1985 1	Bayer 05 Uerdingen	1–0	Bayern Munich	Krefeld
15:30 CEST	Winklhofer 34' (o.g.)	Report		Stadium: Grotenburg-Stadion; Attendance: 26,000; Referee: Heinz Werner

17 August 1985 2	Bayern Munich	4–1	VfB Stuttgart	Munich
15:30 CEST	Rummenigge 33'; Hoeneß 77'; Matthäus 84'; Mathy 88'	Report	Eder 7' (o.g.)	Stadium: Olympiastadion; Attendance: 45,000; Referee: Manfred Neuner

21 August 1985 3	FC Schalke 04	0–1	Bayern Munich	Gelsenkirchen
20:00 CEST		Report	Rummenigge 53'	Stadium: Parkstadion; Attendance: 57,000; Referee: Hans-Peter Dellwing

8 October 1985 4	Bayern Munich	6–0	Hannover 96	Munich
20:00 CET	Nachtweih 17'; Augenthaler 49'; Hartmann 52'; Pflügler 57', 67'; Winklhofer 61'	Report		Stadium: Olympiastadion; Attendance: 13,000; Referee: Manfred Uhlig

3 September 1985 5	1. FC Saarbrücken	1–1	Bayern Munich	Saarbrücken
19:30 CEST	Hönnscheidt 47'	Report	Matthäus 76' (pen.)	Stadium: Ludwigsparkstadion; Attendance: 39,000; Referee: Wolf-Dieter Ahlenfelder

7 September 1985 6	Bayern Munich	2–0	Hamburger SV	Munich
15:30 CEST	Matthäus 69' (pen.); Hartmann 87'	Report		Stadium: Olympiastadion; Attendance: 45,000; Referee: Karl-Josef Assenmacher

14 September 1985 7	1. FC Köln	1–1	Bayern Munich	Cologne
15:30 CEST	Dickel 76'	Report	Augenthaler 2'	Stadium: Müngersdorfer Stadion; Attendance: 43,000; Referee: Hans-Heinrich Barnick

21 September 1985 8	Bayern Munich	2–1	1. FC Nürnberg	Munich
15:30 CEST	Lerby 24'; Rummenigge 55'	Report	Reuter 20'	Stadium: Olympiastadion; Attendance: 74,000; Referee: Rainer Jupe

28 September 1985 9	Fortuna Düsseldorf	4–0	Bayern Munich	Düsseldorf
15:30 CET	Keim 32'; Holmqvist 53'; Demandt 62'; Dusend 87'	Report		Stadium: Rheinstadion; Attendance: 21,500; Referee: Volker Roth

5 October 1985 10	Bayern Munich	3–1	SV Waldhof Mannheim	Munich
15:30 CET	Rummenigge 67'; Hartmann 72', 89'	Report	Remark 1'	Stadium: Olympiastadion; Attendance: 42,000; Referee: Karl-Heinz Tritschler

11 October 1985 11	VfL Bochum	3–0	Bayern Munich	Bochum
20:00 CET	Kuntz 10', 60', 90'	Report		Stadium: Ruhrstadion; Attendance: 32,000; Referee: Franz-Josef Hontheim

26 October 1985 12	Bayern Munich	3–0	Eintracht Frankfurt	Munich
15:30 CET	Wohlfarth 15', 82'; Lerby 63'	Report		Stadium: Olympiastadion; Attendance: 20,000; Referee: Klaus Broska

1 November 1985 13	1. FC Kaiserslautern	0–2	Bayern Munich	Kaiserslautern
20:00 CET		Report	Winklhofer 49'; Eder 82'	Stadium: Stadion Betzenberg; Attendance: 34,000; Referee: Karl-Josef Assenmacher

9 November 1985 14	Bayern Munich	0–1	Borussia Dortmund	Munich
15:30 CET		Report	Bittcher 18'	Stadium: Olympiastadion; Attendance: 15,000; Referee: Horst-Peter Bruch

20 November 1985 15	Bayer Leverkusen	1–2	Bayern Munich	Leverkusen
15:30 CET	Cha 46'	Report	Matthäus 9'; Eder 82'	Stadium: Ulrich-Haberland-Stadion; Attendance: 19,000; Referee: Dr. Wolf-Rüdiger Umbach

23 November 1985 16	Bayern Munich	3–1	Werder Bremen	Munich
15:30 CET	Nachtweih 11'; Hoeneß 64' (pen.), 66'	Report	Schaaf 42'	Stadium: Olympiastadion; Attendance: 37,000; Referee: Gerhard Theobald

30 November 1985 17	Borussia Mönchengladbach	4–2	Bayern Munich	Mönchengladbach
15:30 CET	Criens 8', 25'; Rahn 58'; Dreßen 78'	Report	Rummenigge 71' (pen.); Nachtweih 76'	Stadium: Bökelbergstadion; Attendance: 35,000; Referee: Wolf-Günter Wiesel

7 December 1985 18	Bayern Munich	5–1	Bayer 05 Uerdingen	Munich
15:30 CET	Hoeneß 22', 80'; Lerby 26'; Augenthaler 30'; Pflügler 42'	Report	Schäfer 41'	Stadium: Olympiastadion; Attendance: 13,000; Referee: Hans-Peter Dellwing

14 December 1985 19	VfB Stuttgart	0–0	Bayern Munich	Stuttgart
15:30 CET		Report		Stadium: Neckarstadion; Attendance: 36,000; Referee: Wolf-Dieter Ahlenfelder

25 January 1986 20	Bayern Munich	3–2	FC Schalke 04	Munich
15:30 CET	Hoeneß 43', 70'; Lerby 48'	Report	Täuber 29'; Thon 89'	Stadium: Olympiastadion; Attendance: 10,000; Referee: Franz-Josef Hontheim

1 February 1986 21	Hannover 96	0–5	Bayern Munich	Hannover
15:30 CET		Report	Rummenigge 27'; Hoeneß 53', 84'; Matthäus 61'; Wohlfarth 73'	Stadium: Niedersachsenstadion; Attendance: 58,000; Referee: Peter Gabor

8 February 1986 22	Bayern Munich	5–1	1. FC Saarbrücken	Munich
15:30 CET	Pflügler 33'; Hoeneß 48'; Wohlfarth 51'; Rummenigge 63'; Matthäus 78' (pen.)	Report	Muntubila 10'	Stadium: Olympiastadion; Attendance: 8,500; Referee: Hans Wahmann

15 February 1986 23	Hamburger SV	0–0	Bayern Munich	Hamburg
15:30 CET		Report		Stadium: Volksparkstadion; Attendance: 43,200; Referee: Dieter Pauly

22 February 1986 24	Bayern Munich	3–1	1. FC Köln	Munich
15:30 CET	Matthäus 5' (pen.), 77' (pen.); Wohlfarth 25'	Report	Lehnhoff 64'	Stadium: Olympiastadion; Attendance: 12,000; Referee: Werner Föckler

1 March 1986 25	1. FC Nürnberg	0–1	Bayern Munich	Nuremberg
15:30 CET		Report	Rummenigge 62'	Stadium: Städtisches Stadion; Attendance: 56,300; Referee: Joachim Kautschor

8 March 1986 26	Bayern Munich	2–3	Fortuna Düsseldorf	Munich
15:30 CET	Pflügler 63'; Lerby 83'	Report	Dusend 37', 49'; Fach 45'	Stadium: Olympiastadion; Attendance: 10,000; Referee: Kurt Röthlisberger

15 March 1986 27	SV Waldhof Mannheim	0–4	Bayern Munich	Ludwigshafen
15:30 CET		Report	Hoeneß 7', 15'; Nachtweih 13'; Wohlfarth 34'	Stadium: Südweststadion; Attendance: 30,000; Referee: Udo Horeis

22 March 1986 28	Bayern Munich	6–1	VfL Bochum	Munich
15:30 CET	Rummenigge 11'; Lerby 35'; Willmer 54'; Matthäus 66' (pen.); Wohlfarth 67'; Augenthaler 82'	Report	Wielert 72'	Stadium: Olympiastadion; Attendance: 11,000; Referee: Volker Roth

29 March 1986 29	Eintracht Frankfurt	2–2	Bayern Munich	Frankfurt
15:30 CET	Falkenmayer 12'; Svensson 35'	Report	Hoeneß 60'; Wohlfarth 78'	Stadium: Waldstadion; Attendance: 50,000; Referee: Wilfried Heitmann

5 April 1986 30	Bayern Munich	5–0	1. FC Kaiserslautern	Munich
15:30 CEST	Lerby 15', 34'; Willmer 22'; Wohlfarth 37'; Rummenigge 57'	Report		Stadium: Olympiastadion; Attendance: 18,000; Referee: Manfred Uhlig

12 April 1986 31	Borussia Dortmund	0–3	Bayern Munich	Dortmund
15:30 CEST		Report	Pflügler 34'; Wohlfarth 71', 76'	Stadium: Westfalenstadion; Attendance: 47,000; Referee: Dr. Wolf-Rüdiger Umbach

19 April 1986 32	Bayern Munich	0–0	Bayer Leverkusen	Munich
15:30 CEST		Report		Stadium: Olympiastadion; Attendance: 20,000; Referee: Hans-Peter Dellwing

22 April 1986 33	Werder Bremen	0–0	Bayern Munich	Bremen
20:00 CEST		Report		Stadium: Weserstadion; Attendance: 40,800; Referee: Volker Roth

26 April 1986 34	Bayern Munich	6–0	Borussia Mönchengladbach	Munich
15:30 CEST	Matthäus 1'; Hoeneß 25', 58'; Wohlfarth 48', 80'; Mathy 64'	Report		Stadium: Olympiastadion; Attendance: 70,000; Referee: Wolf-Günter Wiesel

==== Results by round ====
Round	1	2	3	4	5	6	7	8	9	10	11	12	13	14	15	16	17	18	19	20	21	22	23	24	25	26	27	28	29	30	31	32	33	34
Ground	A	H	A	H	A	H	A	H	A	H	A	H	A	H	A	H	A	H	A	H	A	H	A	H	A	H	A	H	A	H	A	H	A	H
Result	L	W	W	W	D	W	D	W	L	W	L	W	W	L	W	W	L	W	D	W	W	W	D	W	W	L	W	W	D	W	W	D	D	W
Position	14	6	3	3	8	3	4	3	6	3	4	3	3	3	3	2	3	2	2	2	2	2	2	2	2	2	2	2	2	2	2	2	2	1

Source: kicker
A = Away; H = Home; W = Win; D = Draw; L = Loss

==== League table ====
Pos	Team	Pld	W	D	L	GF	GA	GD	Pts	Qualification or relegation
1	Bayern Munich (C)	34	21	7	6	82	31	+51	49	Qualification to European Cup first round
2	Werder Bremen	34	20	9	5	83	41	+42	49	Qualification to UEFA Cup first round
3	Bayer 05 Uerdingen	34	19	7	8	63	60	+3	45	Qualification to UEFA Cup first round
4	Borussia Mönchengladbach	34	15	12	7	65	51	+14	42	Qualification to UEFA Cup first round
5	VfB Stuttgart	34	17	7	10	69	45	+24	41	Qualification to Cup Winners' Cup first round (Note: As Bayern Munich also won the domestic cup competition, the Cup Winners' Cup spot was given to losing finalists Stuttgart, while Stuttgart's original UEFA Cup was transferred to Leverkusen.)

Source: www.dfb.de
Rules for classification: 1) points; 2) goal difference; 3) number of goals scored.
(C) Champions

=== DFB Pokal ===
24 August 1985 1st Round	Kickers Offenbach	1–3	Bayern Munich	Offenbach am Main
	Bartenstein 63'	Report	Rummenigge 19'; Augenthaler 67'; Matthäus 71' (pen.)	Stadium: Stadion am Bieberer Berg; Attendance: 20,000; Referee: Anton Matheis

19 October 1985 2nd Round	1. FC Saarbrücken	1–3	Bayern Munich	Saarbrücken
	Seel 85'	Report	Rummenigge 25'; Nachtweih 29'; Pflügler 54'	Stadium: Ludwigsparkstadion; Attendance: 25,000; Referee: Dieter Pauly

13 November 1985 3rd Round	VfL Bochum	1–1 (a.e.t.)	Bayern Munich	Bochum
	Leifeld 62'	Report	Rummenigge 34' (pen.)	Stadium: Ruhrstadion; Attendance: 40,000; Referee: Hans-Joachim Osmers

18 December 1985 3rd Round; Replay	Bayern Munich	2–0	VfL Bochum	Munich
	Wohlfarth 15'; Lerby 38'	Report		Stadium: Olympiastadion; Attendance: 6,500; Referee: Neuner

22 January 1986 Quarterfinals	1. FC Kaiserslautern	0–3	Bayern Munich	Kaiserslautern
		Report	Matthäus 41'; Augenthaler 74'; Wohlfarth 78'	Stadium: Betzenbergstadion; Attendance: 30,500; Referee: Roth

25 March 1986 Semifinals	SV Waldhof Mannheim	0–2	Bayern Munich	Mannheim
		Report	Rummenigge 20'; Hoeneß 27'	Stadium: Carl-Benz-Stadion; Attendance: 38,000; Referee: Karl-Josef Assenmacher

3 May 1986 Finals	Bayern Munich	5–2	VfB Stuttgart	Berlin
	Wohlfarth 34', 40', 77'; Rummenigge 65', 72'	Report	Buchwald 75'; Klinsmann 85'	Stadium: Olympic Stadium (Berlin); Attendance: 76,000; Referee: Dieter Pauly

=== European Cup ===
==== 1st round ====
18 September 1985 1st leg	Górnik Zabrze (Poland)	1–2	(West Germany) Bayern Munich	Zabrze, Poland
17:00 CET	Palacz 32'		Wohlfarth 20'; Hoeneß 81'	Stadium: Górnik Zabrze Stadium; Attendance: 55,000; Referee: Gérard Biguet (France)

2 October 1985 2nd leg	Bayern Munich (West Germany)	4–1 (6–2 agg.)	(Poland) Górnik Zabrze	Munich, West Germany
20:00 CET	Winklhofer 26'; Hartmann 55'; Pflügler 73'; Hoeneß 85'		Majka 17'	Stadium: Olympiastadion; Attendance: 13,500; Referee: Howard W. King (Wales)

==== 2nd round ====
23 October 1985 1st leg	Bayern Munich (West Germany)	4–2	FK Austria Wien	Munich, West Germany
20:00 CET	Mathy 11', 22', 56'; Rummenigge 13'		Steinkogler 9'; Polster 73' (pen.)	Stadium: Olympiastadion; Attendance: 64,000; Referee: André Daina (Switzerland)

7 November 1985 2nd leg	FK Austria Wien	3–3 (5–7 agg.)	(West Germany) Bayern Munich	Vienna, Austria
19:30 CET	Drabits 3'; Polster 71', 87' (pen.)		Wohlfarth 37'; Nactweih 80'; Rummenigge 82'	Stadium: Gerhard Hanappi Stadium; Attendance: 18,000; Referee: Paolo Casarin (Italy)

==== Quarter-finals ====
5 March 1986 1st leg	Bayern Munich (West Germany)	2–1	(Belgium) RSC Anderlecht	Munich, West Germany
20:15 CET	Hoeneß 13'; Wohlfarth 32'		Andersen 72'	Stadium: Olympiastadion; Attendance: 23,000; Referee: Keith Hacket (England)

19 March 1986 2nd leg	RSC Anderlecht (Belgium)	2–0 (3–2 agg.)	(West Germany) Bayern Munich	Anderlecht, Belgium
20:00 CET	Scifo 39'; Frimann 44'			Stadium: Constant Vanden Stock Stadium; Attendance: 42,000; Referee: Angel Franco Martinez (Spain)

== Players ==
=== Squad, appearances and goals ===
No.	Pos	Nat	Player	Total		Bundesliga		European Cup		DFB-Pokal	
No.	Pos	Nat	Player	Apps	Goals	Apps	Goals	Apps	Goals	Apps	Goals
	GK	(Belgium) BEL	Jean-Marie Pfaff	33	0	24	0	5	0	4	0
	GK	(West Germany) FRG	Raimond Aumann	14	0	11	0	1	0	2	0
	DF	(West Germany) FRG	Hans Pflügler	46	7	34	6	6	0	6	1
	DF	(West Germany) FRG	Norbert Eder	46	2	34	2	6	0	6	0
	DF	(West Germany) FRG	Klaus Augenthaler (captain)	42	6	31	4	6	0	5	2
	DF	(West Germany) FRG	Bertram Beierlorzer	19	0	12	0	4	0	3	0
	DF	(West Germany) FRG	Wolfgang Dremmler	7	0	4	0	1	0	2	0
	MF	(West Germany) FRG	Hansi Flick	7	0	6	0	0	0	1	0
	MF	(West Germany) FRG	Lothar Matthäus	31	12	23	10	3	0	5	2
	MF	(West Germany) FRG	Holger Willmer	29	2	20	2	4	0	5	0
	MF	(Denmark) DEN	Søren Lerby	43	9	31	8	6	0	6	1
	MF	(West Germany) FRG	Norbert Nachtweih	37	6	27	4	5	1	5	1
	MF	(West Germany) FRG	Manfred Schwabl	8	0	7	0	1	0	0	0
	MF	(West Germany) FRG	Helmut Winklhofer	19	3	13	2	4	1	2	0
	FW	(West Germany) FRG	Roland Wohlfarth	35	18	25	13	4	3	6	2
	FW	(West Germany) FRG	Ludwig Kögl	28	0	22	0	2	0	4	0
	FW	(West Germany) FRG	Michael Rummenigge	41	16	31	10	6	2	4	4
	FW	(West Germany) FRG	Dieter Hoeneß	38	19	31	15	5	3	2	1
	FW	(West Germany) FRG	Reinhold Mathy	22	5	19	2	1	3	2	0
	FW	(West Germany) FRG	Frank Hartmann	27	5	19	4	5	1	3	0

=== Goals ===
Pos.	Player	BL	EC	Cup	Overall
1	(West Germany) Dieter Hoeneß	15	3	1	19
2	(West Germany) Roland Wohlfarth	13	3	2	18
3	(West Germany) Michael Rummenigge	10	2	4	16
4	(West Germany) Lothar Matthäus	10	0	2	12
5	(Denmark) Søren Lerby	8	0	1	9

=== Bookings ===
N	Pos.	Nat.	Name	Yellow card	Second yellow card	Red card	Notes
	MF	(Denmark)	Søren Lerby	9			
	MF	(West Germany)	Norbert Nachtweih	6			
	DF	(West Germany)	Klaus Augenthaler	6			
	DF	(West Germany)	Bertram Beierlorzer	4			
	FW	(West Germany)	Michael Rummenigge	4			
	MF	(West Germany)	Helmut Winklhofer	3			
	GK	(Belgium)	Jean-Marie Pfaff	3			
	FW	(West Germany)	Dieter Hoeneß	3			
	MF	(West Germany)	Lothar Matthäus	2		1	
	MF	(West Germany)	Holger Willmer	3			
	DF	(West Germany)	Norbert Eder	2			
	MF	(West Germany)	Hansi Flick	2			
	DF	(West Germany)	Hans Pflügler	2			
	FW	(West Germany)	Roland Wohlfarth	2			
	FW	(West Germany)	Ludwig Kögl	1			
	FW	(West Germany)	Frank Hartmann	1			
	DF	(West Germany)	Klaus Augenthaler	1			

Source: kicker
Only competitive matches
(yellow card) = Number of bookings; (second yellow card) = Number of sending offs after a second yellow card; (red card) = Number of sending offs by a direct red card.

== Transfers ==
=== In ===
First Team

No.	Pos.	Nat.	Name	Age	EU	Moving from	Type	Transfer window	Ends	Transfer fee	Source
	FW	(West Germany)	Frank Hartmann	24	EU	Hannover 96	Transfer	Summer		Undisclosed	
	MF	(West Germany)	Hansi Flick	20	EU	SV Sandhausen	Transfer	Summer		Undisclosed	
	MF	(West Germany)	Helmut Winklhofer	23	EU	Bayer Leverkusen	Transfer	Summer		Undisclosed	
	MF	(West Germany)	Manfred Schwabl	19	EU	Youth system	Transfer	Summer		Promoted	

=== Out ===
First Team

No.	Pos.	Nat.	Name	Age	EU	Moving to	Type	Transfer window	Transfer fee	Source
	FW	(West Germany)	Karl Del'Haye	29	EU	Fortuna Düsseldorf	Transfer	Summer	Free	
	FW	(West Germany)	Hans-Werner Grünwald	21	EU	1860 Munich	Transfer	Summer	Undisclosed	
	MF	(West Germany)	Bernd Dürnberger	31	EU		End of career	Summer	N/A	
	DF	(West Germany)	Bernd Martin	30	EU	SSV Ulm 1846	Transfer	Summer	Undisclosed	
