= Victoria Bammental =

German football club

FC Victoria Bammental
- Full name: Fußball-Club Victoria 1910 Bammental e.V.
- Founded: 10 March 1910
- Ground: Stadion an der Schwimmbadstraße
- Capacity: 3,000
- President: Uwe Ulzenheimer
- Head coach: Volkan Glatt, Alexander Welz
- League: Landesliga Rhein-Neckar (VII)
- 2015–16: 3rd
Home colours	Away colours

FC Victoria Bammental is a German association football club from Bammental, Baden-Württemberg south of Heidelberg.

== History ==
The club was established on 1 March 1910 and sometime in 1920 joined Turnverein 1890 Bammental in a merger that lasted until 1924. After World War II FC merged briefly with a handball team to play as Sportverein Bammental before going its separate way again on 15 June 1946.

Victoria first came to notice with their advance to the Amateurliga Nordbaden (III) for a single season turn in 1968–69. They returned to Amateurliga play in 1971 and were relegated after a 15th-place result in 1975. In 1995, the club won its way to the Oberliga Baden-Württemberg (IV) where they played for three seasons before slipping back to the Verbandsliga Nordbaden (V) and then to the Landesliga Rhein-Neckar (VI) in 2006. Victoria was sent down to the Kreisliga Heidelberg (VII) in 2009 after a 14th place Landesliga result. It won the Kreisliga in 2015 and was promoted back to the Landesliga.

Hansi Flick was player-coach between 1996 and 2000.

== Honours ==
- 2. Amateurliga Rhein-Neckar
  - Champions: 1968, 1971, 1993
- Amateurliga Nordbaden
  - Champions: 1995
- Kreisliga Heidelberg
  - Champions: 2015
