= 1985–86 Bundesliga =

23rd season of the Bundesliga

Bundesliga
- Season: 1985–86
- Dates: 9 August 1985 – 26 April 1986
- Champions: Bayern Munich; 8th Bundesliga title 9th German title
- Relegated: 1. FC Saarbrücken; Hannover 96
- European Cup: FC Bayern Munich
- Cup Winners' Cup: VfB Stuttgart
- UEFA Cup: SV Werder Bremen; Bayer 05 Uerdingen; Borussia Mönchengladbach; Bayer 04 Leverkusen
- Matches: 306
- Goals: 992 (3.24 per match)
- Average goals/game: 3.24
- Top goalscorer: Stefan Kuntz (22)
- Biggest home win: Stuttgart 7–0 Hannover (8 February 1986)
- Biggest away win: Düsseldorf 0–7 Stuttgart (15 March 1986)
- Highest scoring: Bremen 8–2 Hannover (10 goals) (16 August 1985); Bremen 7–3 Düsseldorf (10 goals) (22 February 1986)

The 1985–86 Bundesliga was the 23rd season of the Bundesliga, the premier football league in West Germany. It began on 9 August 1985 and ended on 26 April 1986. Bayern Munich were the defending champions.

== Competition modus ==
Every team played two games against each other team, one at home and one away. Teams received two points for a win and one point for a draw. If two or more teams were tied on points, places were determined by goal difference and, if still tied, by goals scored. The team with the most points were crowned champions while the two teams with the fewest points were relegated to 2. Bundesliga. The third-to-last team had to compete in a two-legged relegation/promotion play-off against the third-placed team from 2. Bundesliga.

== Team changes to 1984–85 ==
Karlsruher SC and Eintracht Braunschweig were directly relegated to the 2. Bundesliga after finishing in the last two places. They were replaced by 1. FC Nürnberg and Hannover 96. Karlsruhe and Braunschweig were eventually joined in demotion by relegation/promotion play-off participant Arminia Bielefeld, who lost on aggregate against 1. FC Saarbrücken.

== Team overview ==
Location of teams in Bundesliga 1985–86

Club	Location	Ground	Capacity
VfL Bochum	Bochum	Ruhrstadion	40,000
SV Werder Bremen	Bremen	Weserstadion	32,000
Borussia Dortmund	Dortmund	Westfalenstadion	54,000
Fortuna Düsseldorf	Düsseldorf	Rheinstadion	59,600
Eintracht Frankfurt	Frankfurt am Main	Waldstadion	62,000
Hamburger SV	Hamburg	Volksparkstadion	80,000
Hannover 96	Hanover	Niedersachsenstadion	60,400
1. FC Kaiserslautern	Kaiserslautern	Stadion Betzenberg	42,000
1. FC Köln	Cologne	Müngersdorfer Stadion	61,000
Bayer 04 Leverkusen	Leverkusen	Ulrich-Haberland-Stadion	20,000
SV Waldhof Mannheim	Ludwigshafen am Rhein	Südweststadion	75,000
Borussia Mönchengladbach	Mönchengladbach	Bökelbergstadion	34,500
FC Bayern Munich	Munich	Olympiastadion	80,000
1. FC Nürnberg	Nuremberg	Städtisches Stadion	64,238
1. FC Saarbrücken	Saarbrücken	Ludwigspark	40,000
FC Schalke 04	Gelsenkirchen	Parkstadion	70,000
VfB Stuttgart	Stuttgart	Neckarstadion	72,000
Bayer 05 Uerdingen	Krefeld	Grotenburg-Kampfbahn	28,000

- ^1 Waldhof Mannheim played their matches in nearby Ludwigshafen because their own ground did not fulfil Bundesliga requirements.

== League table ==
Pos	Team	Pld	W	D	L	GF	GA	GD	Pts	Qualification or relegation
1	Bayern Munich (C)	34	21	7	6	82	31	+51	49	Qualification to European Cup first round
2	Werder Bremen	34	20	9	5	83	41	+42	49	Qualification to UEFA Cup first round
3	Bayer 05 Uerdingen	34	19	7	8	63	60	+3	45	Qualification to UEFA Cup first round
4	Borussia Mönchengladbach	34	15	12	7	65	51	+14	42	Qualification to UEFA Cup first round
5	VfB Stuttgart	34	17	7	10	69	45	+24	41	Qualification to Cup Winners' Cup first round (Note: As Bayern Munich also won the domestic cup competition, the Cup Winners' Cup spot was given to losing finalists Stuttgart, while Stuttgart's original UEFA Cup was transferred to Leverkusen.)
6	Bayer Leverkusen	34	15	10	9	63	51	+12	40	Qualification to UEFA Cup first round
7	Hamburger SV	34	17	5	12	52	35	+17	39	
8	Waldhof Mannheim	34	11	11	12	41	44	−3	33	
9	VfL Bochum	34	14	4	16	55	57	−2	32	
10	Schalke 04	34	11	8	15	53	58	−5	30	
11	1. FC Kaiserslautern	34	10	10	14	49	54	−5	30	
12	1. FC Nürnberg	34	12	5	17	51	54	−3	29	
13	1. FC Köln	34	9	11	14	46	59	−13	29	
14	Fortuna Düsseldorf	34	11	7	16	54	78	−24	29	
15	Eintracht Frankfurt	34	7	14	13	35	49	−14	28	
16	Borussia Dortmund (O)	34	10	8	16	49	65	−16	28	Qualification to relegation play-offs
17	1. FC Saarbrücken (R)	34	6	9	19	39	68	−29	21	Relegation to 2. Bundesliga
18	Hannover 96 (R)	34	5	8	21	43	92	−49	18	Relegation to 2. Bundesliga

Source: www.dfb.de
Rules for classification: 1) points; 2) goal difference; 3) number of goals scored.
(C) Champions; (O) Play-off winners; (R) Relegated

== Results ==
Home \ Away	BOC	SVW	BVB	F95	SGE	HSV	H96	FCK	KOE	B04	WMA	BMG	FCB	FCN	FCS	S04	VFB	B05
VfL Bochum	—	2–3	6–1	5–3	2–1	2–0	3–2	3–2	2–0	1–1	0–1	2–2	3–0	2–1	3–1	1–1	0–2	1–2
Werder Bremen	0–0	—	4–2	7–3	4–0	2–0	8–2	2–0	2–0	5–0	2–2	1–1	0–0	2–1	1–0	3–1	6–0	6–1
Borussia Dortmund	1–0	1–1	—	1–2	4–2	1–1	2–0	4–2	5–1	1–1	0–0	2–3	0–3	1–4	3–1	1–1	2–0	5–2
Fortuna Düsseldorf	2–1	1–4	4–2	—	0–1	3–1	2–2	0–0	1–3	2–1	4–1	2–0	4–0	2–1	2–2	1–1	0–7	1–1
Eintracht Frankfurt	1–0	0–2	2–1	2–0	—	3–0	1–3	1–1	2–2	1–0	0–0	1–1	2–2	1–1	1–3	3–0	1–1	1–1
Hamburger SV	1–0	0–1	3–0	4–0	1–0	—	3–0	4–1	0–0	1–3	3–0	4–1	0–0	2–1	4–0	2–0	2–0	1–4
Hannover 96	1–2	2–4	1–4	1–0	0–0	0–2	—	3–2	3–1	1–1	1–1	2–3	0–5	0–2	2–0	1–2	1–3	1–1
1. FC Kaiserslautern	2–0	3–0	2–0	2–0	1–1	1–2	1–0	—	1–0	4–1	0–0	1–1	0–2	0–3	1–1	0–0	2–2	5–1
1. FC Köln	3–0	3–3	2–0	1–3	1–1	1–1	3–0	1–1	—	2–3	0–1	0–2	1–1	3–1	3–1	4–2	2–1	1–1
Bayer Leverkusen	4–2	5–1	2–1	3–1	2–0	3–2	4–1	3–2	1–1	—	3–1	3–1	1–2	0–0	2–0	2–0	2–1	2–2
Waldhof Mannheim	4–1	1–1	0–0	2–1	0–0	0–1	5–1	1–1	1–1	1–0	—	3–1	0–4	0–1	1–0	3–0	5–3	2–0
Borussia Mönchengladbach	2–0	1–2	2–1	5–1	1–1	2–1	4–3	3–0	1–1	2–2	1–1	—	4–2	3–0	2–0	4–0	1–1	1–2
Bayern Munich	6–1	3–1	0–1	2–3	3–0	2–0	6–0	5–0	3–1	0–0	3–1	6–0	—	2–1	5–1	3–2	4–1	5–1
1. FC Nürnberg	0–1	2–2	0–0	3–2	4–1	0–1	3–3	3–1	3–0	3–2	2–0	2–4	0–1	—	2–0	3–1	0–1	1–2
1. FC Saarbrücken	0–1	1–1	1–1	1–1	2–2	2–2	2–1	0–6	1–2	3–1	2–1	1–3	1–1	3–0	—	3–2	1–1	1–2
Schalke 04	4–2	0–1	6–1	1–1	3–1	1–0	2–2	2–3	3–0	2–2	3–1	2–2	0–1	2–0	3–2	—	1–2	2–0
VfB Stuttgart	0–4	2–1	4–0	5–0	2–1	1–0	7–0	2–0	5–0	2–2	3–1	0–0	0–0	3–1	3–1	0–1	—	0–2
Bayer Uerdingen	3–2	1–0	2–0	5–2	1–0	0–3	3–3	3–1	3–2	2–1	1–0	1–1	1–0	6–2	2–1	3–2	1–4	—

Source: DFB
Legend: Blue = home team win; Yellow = draw; Red = away team win.

== Relegation play-offs ==
Borussia Dortmund and third-placed 2. Bundesliga team SC Fortuna Köln had to compete in a two-legged relegation/promotion play-off. After a two-leg series, both teams were tied 3–3 on aggregate, so a deciding third match had to be scheduled. Dortmund won this match, 8–0, and retained their Bundesliga status.

13 May 1986

Fortuna Köln	2–0	Borussia Dortmund
Grabosch 53'; Richter 75'	Report link (in German)

Müngersdorfer Stadion, Cologne
Attendance: 44,000
Referee: Volker Roth (Salzgitter)

17 May 1986

Borussia Dortmund	3–1	Fortuna Köln
Zorc 54' (pen.); Răducanu 68'; Wegmann 90'	Report link (in German)	Grabosch 14'

Westfalenstadion, Dortmund
Attendance: 54,000
Referee: Aron Schmidhuber (Ottobrunn)

30 May 1986

Borussia Dortmund	8–0	Fortuna Köln
Hupe 31'; Zorc 46', 89'; Anderbrügge 49'; Storck 61'; Simmes 66'; Wegmann 84' (pen.); Pagelsdorf 90'	Report link (in German)

Rheinstadion, Düsseldorf
Attendance: 50,000
Referee: Karl-Heinz Tritschler (Freiburg)

== Top goalscorers ==
22 goals

- (Germany) Stefan Kuntz (VfL Bochum)

21 goals

- (Germany) Karl Allgöwer (VfB Stuttgart)

20 goals

- (Germany) Frank Neubarth (SV Werder Bremen)

17 goals

- (South Korea) Cha Bum-Kun (Bayer 04 Leverkusen)

16 goals

- (Germany) Thomas Allofs (1. FC Kaiserslautern)
- (Germany) Jürgen Klinsmann (VfB Stuttgart)
- (Germany) Klaus Täuber (FC Schalke 04)

15 goals

- (Germany) Dieter Hoeneß (FC Bayern Munich)

14 goals

- (Germany) Herbert Waas (Bayer 04 Leverkusen)
- (Germany) Jürgen Wegmann (Borussia Dortmund)

== Champion squad ==
FC Bayern Munich
Goalkeepers: Jean-Marie Pfaff (Belgium) (24); Raimond Aumann (11).

Defenders: Hans Pflügler (34 / 6); Norbert Eder (34 / 2); Klaus Augenthaler (31 / 4); Holger Willmer (20 / 2); Bertram Beierlorzer (12).
Midfielders: Søren Lerby (Denmark) (31 / 8); Norbert Nachtweih (East Germany) (27 / 4); Lothar Matthäus (23 / 10); Helmut Winklhofer (13 / 2); Manfred Schwabl (7); Hansi Flick (6); Wolfgang Dremmler (4).
Forwards: Dieter Hoeneß (31 / 15); Michael Rummenigge (31 / 10); Roland Wohlfarth (25 / 13); Ludwig Kögl (22); Frank Hartmann (19 / 4); Reinhold Mathy (19 / 2).
(league appearances and goals listed in brackets)

Manager: Udo Lattek.

On the roster but have not played in a league game: Christiaan Pförtner; Wolfgang Grobe; Ugur Tütüneker.

== See also ==
- 1985–86 2. Bundesliga
- 1985–86 DFB-Pokal
