= Helmut Winklhofer =

German footballer

Personal information
- Full name: Helmut Winklhofer
- Date of birth: 27 August 1961 (age 65)
- Place of birth: Fürstenzell, West Germany
- Position: Defender

Youth career
- –1980: FC Fürstenzell

Senior career*
| Years | Team | Apps | (Gls) |
| 1981–1982 | Bayern Munich | 2 | (1) |
| 1982–1985 | Bayer Leverkusen | 90 | (5) |
| 1985–1990 | Bayern Munich | 48 | (2) |
| Total | | 140 | (8) |

International career
| 1983 | West Germany U-21 | 2 | (1) |
Medal record
Representing West Germany
Men's football
FIFA World Youth Championship
| Winner | 1981 Australia |
- * Club domestic league appearances and goals

Helmut Winklhofer (born 27 August 1961) is a German former professional footballer who played as a defender or midfielder for Bayer 04 Leverkusen and FC Bayern Munich. He won four German titles and played in the 1987 European Cup Final before his career was cut short by injury in 1990.

He is also known for scoring one of the best own goals in football history from a difficulty standpoint, larroping the ball from approximately 30 yards out past his own keeper in the 1985–86 Bundesliga against KFC Uerdingen 05 in a 1-0 loss for Bayern.

== Honours ==
=== Club ===
Bayern Munich

- Bundesliga: 1985–86, 1986–87, 1988–89, 1989–90
- DFB-Pokal: 1981–82, 1985–86
- European Cup: Runner-up 1986–87
- DFL-Supercup: 1987

=== International ===
Germany

- FIFA World Youth Championship: 1981
