= Christiaan Pförtner =

German footballer

Personal information
- Full name: Christiaan Pförtner
- Date of birth: 3 March 1966 (age 60)
- Place of birth: West Berlin, West Germany
- Height: 1.72 m (5 ft 8 in)
- Position: Midfielder

Youth career
- TSV Waldtrudering
- –1985: Bayern Munich

Senior career*
Years	Team	Apps	(Gls)
1985	FC Bayern Munich	0	(0)
1985–1986	SpVgg Bayreuth	21	(0)
1986–1989	SC Fortuna Köln	85	(24)
1989–1992	1. FC Saarbrücken	96	(14)
1992–1993	FC 08 Homburg	19	(1)
1993–1995	Hannover 96	32	(3)
1995–1996	TSV Havelse		
1996–1997	SC Fortuna Köln	4	(0)
Total		260	(42)

International career
1982	West Germany U-16	4	(1)
1982–1983	West Germany U-18	8	(0)
1987	West Germany U-21	3	(0)
- * Club domestic league appearances and goals

Christiaan Pförtner (born 3 March 1966 in West Berlin) is a retired German footballer who played for SpVgg Bayreuth, SC Fortuna Köln, 1. FC Saarbrücken, FC 08 Homburg and Hannover 96.
