= Lars Lunde =

Danish footballer (born 1964)

Personal information
- Full name: Lars Henri Lunde
- Date of birth: 21 March 1964 (age 62)
- Place of birth: Nyborg, Denmark
- Height: 1.78 m (5 ft 10 in)
- Position: Striker

Senior career*
Years	Team	Apps	(Gls)
1982	Boldklubben 1909	28	(5)
1983–1984	Brøndby IF	56	(10)
1984–1986	Young Boys Bern	55	(30)
1986–1989	Bayern Munich	30	(3)
1987–1989	→ Aarau (loan)	12	(5)
1989–1990	FC Zug	29	(6)
1990–1991	Baden	?	(?)
Total		210	(59)

International career
1983–1986	Denmark U–21	14	(3)
1983–1987	Denmark	3	(0)
- * Club domestic league appearances and goals

Lars Lunde (born 21 March 1964) is a Danish former professional football player, who played in the striker position. Lunde got his breakthrough with Brøndby IF in 1983, and he made his debut for the Denmark national football team in October 1983. He was sold to Young Boys Bern in Switzerland, before moving to German club Bayern Munich in 1986. He was a part of the Bayern team which won the German Bundesliga championship in 1987, and he came on as a late substitute when Bayern lost the 1987 European Cup Final to FC Porto. He played the last of his three matches for the Danish national team in April 1987, before leaving Bayern during the 1987–88 season. He went on to play for a number of smaller clubs, ending his career with FC Baden in Switzerland.

== Honours ==
Young Boys Bern

- Swiss League: 1985–86
- Swiss Super Cup: 1986

Bayern Munich

- Bundesliga: 1986–87

Individual

- Swiss Foreign Footballer of the Year: 1985–86
