= Frank Hartmann (footballer, born August 1960) =

German footballer

Personal information
- Date of birth: 17 August 1960 (age 66)
- Place of birth: Hanover, West Germany
- Height: 1.78 m (5 ft 10 in)
- Position: Forward

Youth career
- 1967–1980: TSV Havelse

Senior career*
| Years | Team | Apps | (Gls) |
| 1980–1985 | Hannover 96 | 134 | (41) |
| 1985–1986 | Bayern Munich | 20 | (4) |
| 1986–1989 | Hannover 96 | 36 | (7) |
| 1989–1990 | SG Wattenscheid 09 | 16 | (1) |
- TSV Wennigsen
- TSV Kirchrode
| 1994–1995 | VfL Osnabrück | | |
| 1995–1998 | SV 1975 Damla Genc | | |
| 1998–2000 | TSV Havelse | | |

Managerial career
- 1998–2000: TSV Havelse
- * Club domestic league appearances and goals

Frank Hartmann (born 17 August 1960) is a German former proefssional footballer who played as a forward.

== Honours ==
Bayern Munich

- DFB-Pokal: 1985–86
- Bundesliga: 1985–86
