= Hansi Flick =

German football player and manager (born 1965)

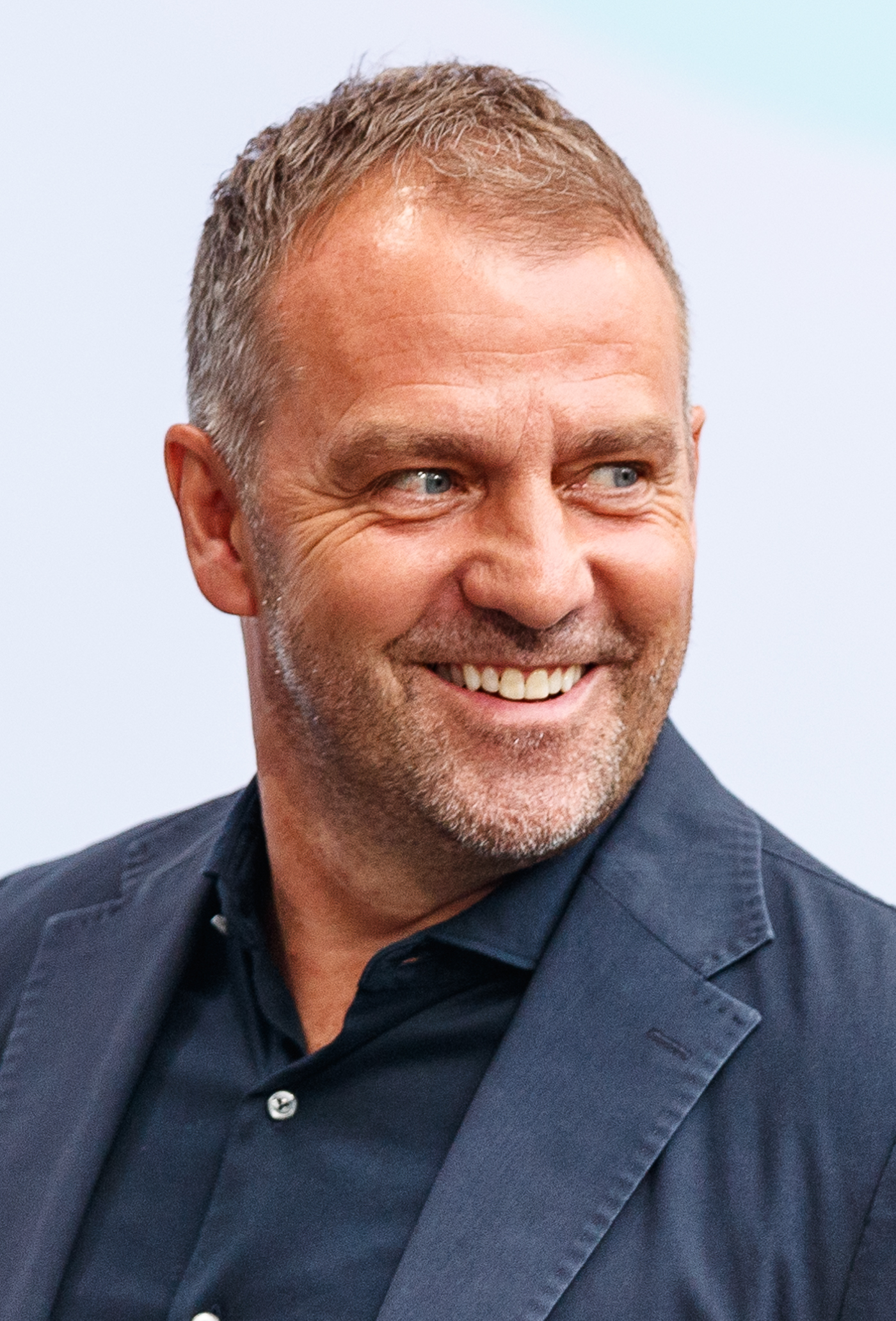
- Flick in 2022

Personal information
- Full name: Hans-Dieter Flick
- Date of birth: 24 February 1965 (age 61)
- Place of birth: Heidelberg, West Germany
- Height: 1.77 m (5 ft 10 in)
- Position: Midfielder

Team information
- Current team: Barcelona (manager)

Youth career
- 1971–1976: BSC Mückenloch
- 1976–1981: SpVgg Neckargemünd
- 1981–1982: SV Sandhausen

Senior career*
Years	Team	Apps	(Gls)
1982–1985	SV Sandhausen	69	(8)
1985–1990	Bayern Munich	104	(5)
1990–1993	1. FC Köln	44	(1)
1994–2000	Victoria Bammental		

International career
1983	West Germany U18	2	(0)

Managerial career
- 1996–2000: Victoria Bammental
- 2000–2005: TSG Hoffenheim
- 2019–2021 (Note: Briefly worked assistant manager in 2019): Bayern Munich
- 2021–2023 (Note: Previously worked as assistant manager between 2006–2014): Germany
- 2024–: Barcelona
Medal record
Representing Germany (as assistant manager)
FIFA World Cup
Winner	2014 Brazil
Third place	2010 South Africa
UEFA European Championship
Runner-up	2008 Austria–Switzerland
Third place	2012 Poland–Ukraine	(Note: Although there was no third-place playoff, both losing semi-finalists (Germany and Portugal) were awarded bronze medals by UEFA.)
- * Club domestic league appearances and goals

Hans-Dieter "Hansi" Flick (German: [ˈhanzi ˈflɪk]; born 24 February 1965) is a German professional football manager and former player who is the head coach of La Liga club Barcelona. He is widely considered to be one of the best managers in the world.

A midfielder, Flick played for SV Sandhausen, Bayern Munich, and 1. FC Köln during his career as a player. He made two appearances for the Germany under-18 national team but never played for the senior national team. At Bayern, he won four Bundesliga titles as well as one DFB-Pokal title. After playing at 1. FC Köln, Flick began his managerial career as player-manager of fourth-division club Victoria Bammental. In 2000, he became manager of fellow fourth-division side TSG 1899 Hoffenheim, leading the team to promotion to the Regionalliga Süd before leaving in 2005. From 2006 to 2014, Flick was the assistant coach of the German national team under Joachim Löw, contributing to their victory at the 2014 FIFA World Cup. He subsequently served as the sporting director of the German Football Association (DFB) from 2014 to 2017.

Having rejoined Bayern Munich as an assistant coach in 2019, Flick was made interim manager following the departure of Niko Kovač in November 2019. He was later appointed permanently, and won the UEFA Champions League that season, completing the club's second continental treble. In 2021, Flick also led the side to a FIFA Club World Cup and another Bundesliga title. He, along with Pep Guardiola and Luis Enrique, are the only managers to have ever achieved a sextuple with their team. He later replaced Löw in charge of the Germany national team in 2021, leading the team to qualification for the 2022 FIFA World Cup, before being dismissed in 2023. In 2024, he joined Spanish club Barcelona, winning a domestic treble in his debut season at the club, followed by a La Liga and a Supercopa de España titles in his next.

== Playing career ==
During his playing career, he was a midfielder who played 104 matches for Bayern Munich and scored five goals between 1985 and 1990. At Bayern, he won four Bundesliga titles as well as one DFB-Pokal title, and played in the 1987 European Cup Final. He later played 44 matches for Köln before retiring from professional football in 1993 due to injuries. His last spell as a footballer was with Victoria Bammental from 1994 until 2000.

Flick never played for the Germany national football team, but made two appearances for the Germany under-18 team, in the group stage of the 1983 UEFA European Under-18 Championship on 15 and 17 May 1983, in a 1–0 win over Sweden and in a 3–1 win over Bulgaria, respectively.

== Managerial career ==
Flick's managerial career began in 1996 as a player-manager of Victoria Bammental, which was playing in the Oberliga Baden-Württemberg at that time. At the end of the 1997–98 season, the club was relegated to the Verbandsliga Baden, but he remained their coach for two more seasons.

=== TSG Hoffenheim ===
In July 2000, Flick became a manager of the Oberliga Baden-Württemberg side TSG 1899 Hoffenheim, winning the league and gaining promotion to the Regionalliga Süd in his first season at the club. He also won North Baden Cup four times in a row, between 2002 and 2005. After four unsuccessful attempts to reach the 2. Bundesliga, he was released from duties on 19 November 2005. During his tenure at Hoffenheim, Flick graduated first in his class, alongside Thomas Doll, from the German Sport University Cologne, gaining his top coaching credentials in 2003.

=== Red Bull Salzburg (assistant) ===
Flick later worked briefly as an assistant of Giovanni Trapattoni and Lothar Matthäus and sporting coordinator at Red Bull Salzburg. He stated that his work under Trapattoni, one of the world's most renowned managers, taught him many things, especially on tactics and in developing relations with players, but also said that he disagreed with Trapattoni's defence-first approach.

=== Germany (assistant) ===
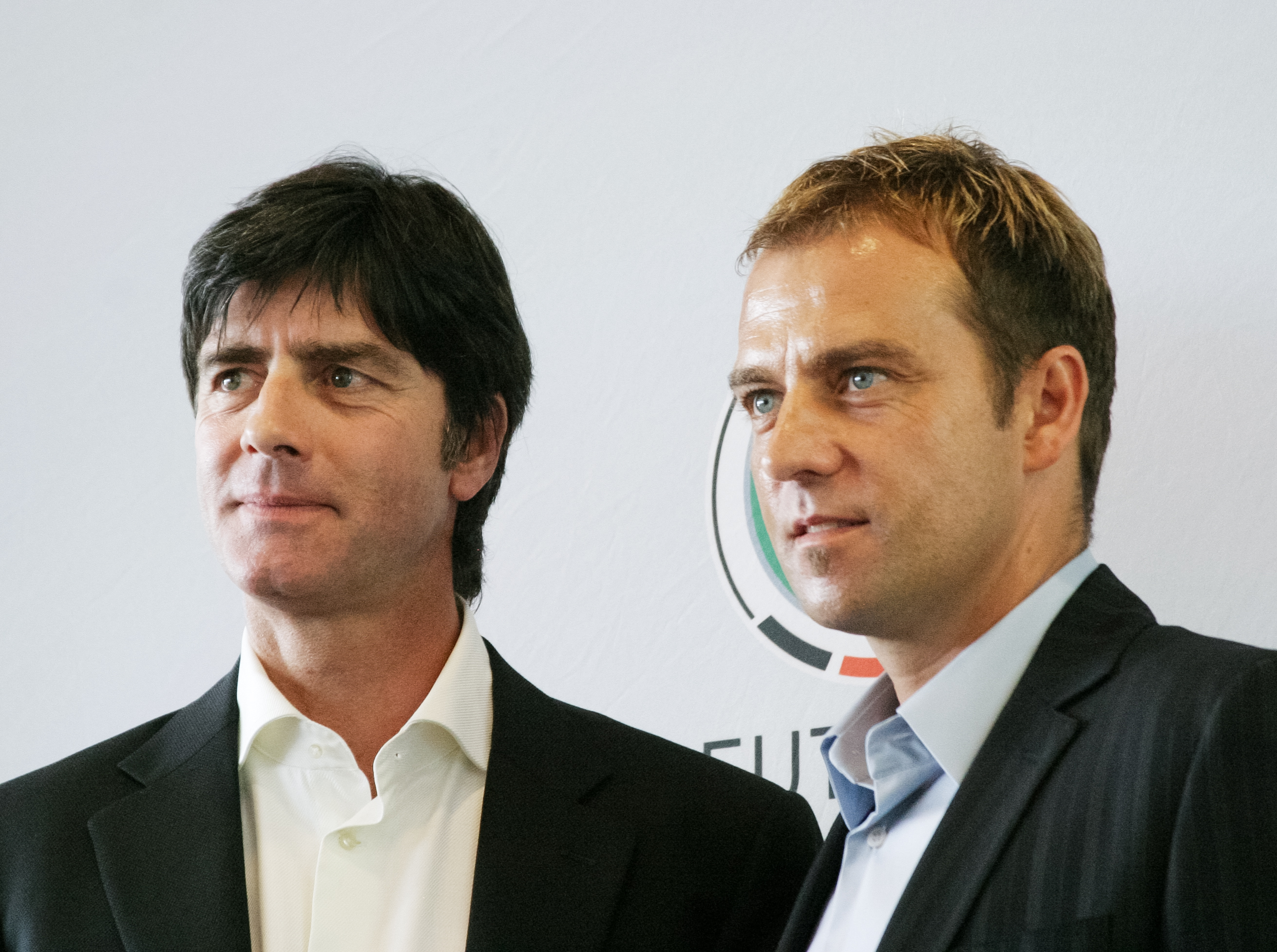
Flick (right) with Joachim Löw in 2006

Flick was named the assistant coach for Germany on 23 August 2006. Although not listed as an officially recognized manager by the DFB, due to the sending off of Joachim Löw in the previous game, Flick was technically the German manager for the UEFA Euro 2008 quarter final against Portugal on 19 June 2008, which ended in a 3–2 win for Germany. After finishing second at the UEFA Euro 2008 and third at the 2010 FIFA World Cup, he reached the semi-finals at the UEFA Euro 2012 and won the 2014 FIFA World Cup as assistant coach of Germany.

=== Germany (sporting director) ===
Flick became sporting director at the German Football Association (DFB) after the 2014 World Cup until 16 January 2017.

=== TSG Hoffenheim (sporting director) ===
Flick was appointed sporting director of Hoffenheim, the team he had previously coached, at the start of the 2017–18 season. However, the contract, which was signed for five years, was terminated after just eight months.

=== Bayern Munich ===
On 2 July 2019, Flick joined Bundesliga club Bayern Munich as an assistant coach, under the management of Niko Kovač. When Kovač left Bayern by mutual consent on 3 November 2019, he was promoted to the interim manager position. In his first match in charge, Bayern defeated Olympiacos 2–0 in the UEFA Champions League group stage on 6 November 2019. After a satisfying spell as interim coach, Bayern announced on 22 December 2019 that Flick would remain manager until the end of season.

In April 2020, Bayern Munich gave Flick a new contract lasting until 2023.

During the 2019–20 season, Flick successfully guided Bayern to win the Bundesliga, DFB-Pokal and UEFA Champions League, thus completing the continental treble for the second time in the club's history. He was subsequently named German Football Manager of the Year by sports magazine Kicker, and also won the UEFA Men's Coach of the Year Award. The following season, he led Bayern to win the 2020 UEFA Super Cup against Sevilla. He also led Bayern to win its first ever sextuple after winning Club World Cup in February 2021 by defeating Mexican team Tigres.

On 17 April 2021, Flick announced that he had told the club he wanted to leave at the end of the season. He voiced his desire to coach the Germany national team, given his previous job as an assistant to present German team manager, Joachim Löw. Flick left Bayern with one of the greatest winning records in modern football history. During his tenure, Bayern lost just seven games and won seven out of nine possible trophies (Bundesliga twice, DFB-Pokal, UEFA Champions League, DFL-Supercup, UEFA Super Cup, FIFA Club World Cup). Bayern went undefeated in the 2019–20 Champions League, the first team in European/Champions League history to lift the trophy with a 100 percent win record, and won 23 matches in a row across all competitions between 16 February 2020 and 18 September 2020, a record in German professional football. Flick also coached Bayern to a treble, the second treble in Bayern's history. Flick held one of the highest win rates in football history, winning 83% of his games and helped Bayern average 3.0 goals per game across all competitions. In October 2020, Flick won Europe's Coach of the Year, an award for the best coach in football in the major football leagues of Europe.

=== Germany ===
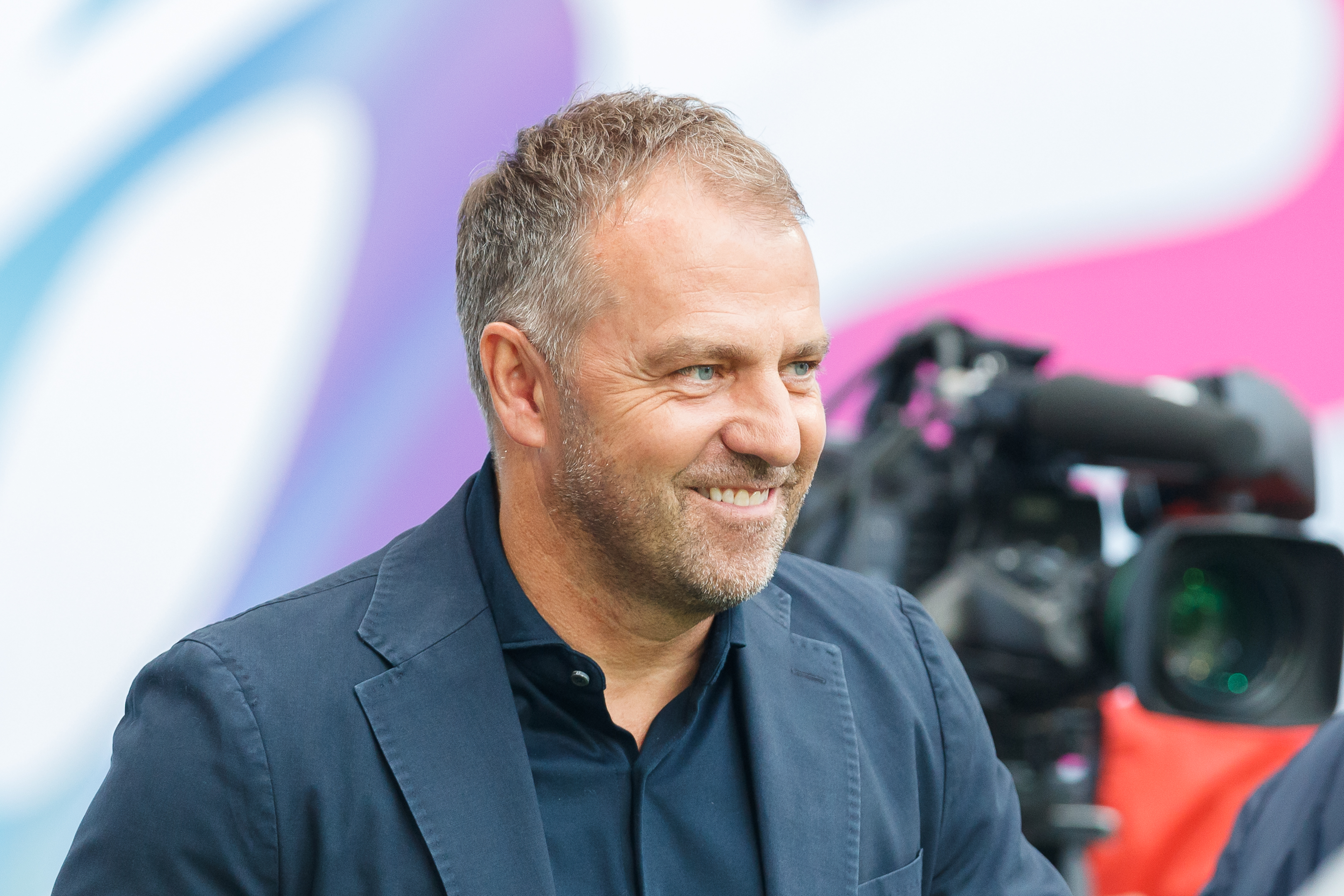
Flick in 2022

On 25 May 2021, the German Football Association announced that Flick signed a three-year contract from 1 August 2021 to serve as the manager of the Germany national team, and he replaced his former boss Joachim Löw after UEFA Euro 2020. On 2 September 2021, Flick won his first match 2–0 against Liechtenstein in a 2022 FIFA World Cup qualification match. On 4 June 2022, Germany drew 1–1 with Italy in the 2022–23 UEFA Nations League A, and thus became the third coach to stay undefeated in his first ten matches, after Sepp Herberger and Jupp Derwall. This run would end on 23 September, as Germany lost 1–0 to Hungary in the same competition.

In the 2022 FIFA World Cup, Germany was eliminated in the group stage for the second time in a row, as they finished third in their group, despite winning their final match 4–2 against Costa Rica. Flick received criticism for his substitutions, particularly against Japan in their tournament opener, which they lost 1–2.

Flick was sacked on 10 September 2023, a day after a 1–4 loss in a friendly against Japan, the team's third defeat in a row. Flick lasted two years in charge and had the second-worst point rate of 1.72, only ahead of Erich Ribbeck with 1.50 points per game. He was also the first manager of Germany to be sacked in the role's history.

=== Barcelona ===
On 29 May 2024, Flick signed as the Manager of La Liga club Barcelona on a contract until 30 June 2026. He became the third German in the club's coaching history, after Hennes Weisweiler and Udo Lattek.

Flick won his first league match as Barcelona manager on 17 August 2024, securing a 1–2 comeback victory against Valencia at the Mestalla, breaking Barcelona's two-year streak of 0–0 draws on matchday 1. He suffered his first La Liga defeat as Barcelona manager in a 4–2 defeat to Osasuna on 28 September. On 23 October, Flick managed a win against his former team Bayern Munich where Barcelona won 4–1 at the Estadi Olímpic Lluís Companys. Three days later, Flick won his first El Clásico in charge, a 4–0 domination of Real Madrid at the Bernabéu.

On 12 January 2025, Flick secured his first title with Barcelona by defeating Real Madrid in the Supercopa de España final held at the King Abdullah Sports City Stadium in Jeddah, Saudi Arabia. Despite conceding an early goal to Kylian Mbappé, Barcelona responded with a dominant first-half performance, scoring four goals. Even after goalkeeper Wojciech Szczęsny was sent off, Barcelona maintained control to clinch their 15th Supercopa title with a commanding 5–2 victory.

On 26 April 2025, Flick guided Barcelona to a 3–2 extra-time victory over Real Madrid in the Copa del Rey final at the Estadio de La Cartuja in Seville, securing the club's 32nd title in the competition.

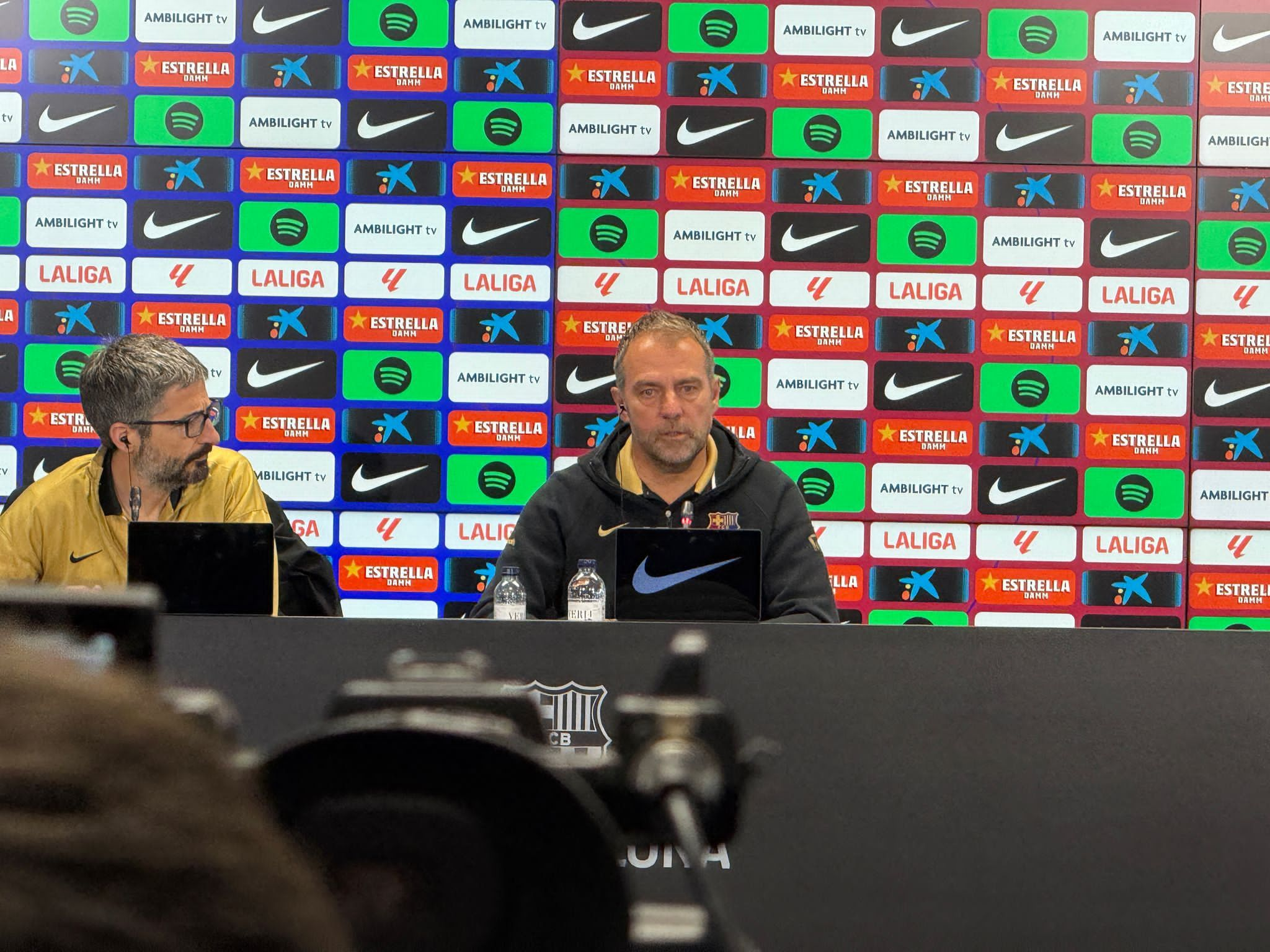
Flick during a press conference with Barcelona in 2025

On 30 April and 6 May 2025, Flick managed Barcelona in the UEFA Champions League semi-final against Inter Milan. Despite being eliminated 7–6 on aggregate, his tactical approach received praise for its intensity and attacking intent. Flick employed a 4–2–3–1 formation focused on high pressing and wide overloads, with Lamine Yamal and Raphinha stretching Inter's defensive shape. While Barcelona created numerous chances and scored six goals over the two legs, their aggressive high line was repeatedly exposed by Inter's direct counter-attacks. Despite the elimination, the matches were seen as a reaffirmation of Flick's proactive tactical identity.

Following a 2–0 win over their rivals Espanyol on 15 May 2025, Flick achieved his first La Liga title with Barcelona, with goals from Lamine Yamal and Fermín López. This game confirmed Flick's domestic double, as he added his league title to his win in the Copa del Rey.

During the 2024–25 season, Flick led Barcelona to an unprecedented four victories over Real Madrid in official competitions, including both La Liga fixtures, the Supercopa de España final, and the Copa del Rey final. This marked the first time in the modern era that Barcelona achieved a clean sweep over their rivals in all official matches within a single season. Then, on 21 May 2025, Flick signed a contract extension until 2027.

Barcelona continued the good form the following season in completing a double by winning the Supercopa de España in Jeddah, Saudi Arabia, and once again the Spanish league, La Liga, after the Clásico in May of the 2025–26 season with three games to spare. After that victory, with the side now 14 points ahead, it was mathematically impossible for Real Madrid to win the league. With his success at the club, Flick signed a one year contract extension bringing his time up to 2028.

== Manager profile ==
While in charge of Bayern Munich, Flick developed the name 'Flicki-Flaka' in the media to characterize the mixed gegenpressing and possession based style of football the team played.

Flick consistently deployed a 4–2–3–1 formation at Bayern Munich featuring a high defensive line that encourages their double pivot and full-backs to adopt positions where they can press the ball as it approaches the midfield third, and to screen and block against switches of play. In Bayern's 8–2 win over Barcelona en route to winning the 2019–20 UEFA Champions League, three out of their first four goals came within ten seconds after regaining possession, as Flick likes to keep passing lanes short with players much closer to the ball. Another tactic that Flick uses to create space on one side is to begin the play on one side of the field and gradually draw the opposition to shift to the ball side.

While in charge of the German national team, Flick experimented with fielding a back-three system with indifferent results.

Upon his appointment as Barcelona's head coach in May 2024, Hansi Flick implemented a tactical system characterized by a high defensive line, coordinated pressing, and an aggressive offside trap. This strategy was notably effective in his first El Clásico on 26 October 2024, where Barcelona secured a 4–0 victory over Real Madrid at the Santiago Bernabéu. In that match, Real Madrid were caught offside 12 times—the highest number in a La Liga match since 2013—with Kylian Mbappé alone flagged eight times and having two goals disallowed.

Flick's Barcelona also exhibited a dynamic attacking approach, blending vertical transitions and short-passing combinations with positional play. The team led La Liga in through balls by mid-season and maintained one of the highest pass completion rates in the league, reflecting Flick's emphasis on close support play and efficient ball circulation.

He is also known for his detailed match preparation and strong in-game management. While he traditionally favors a 4–2–3–1 system, Flick has shown flexibility, occasionally employing asymmetrical full-back roles or compact midfield presses depending on the opposition. Under his leadership, players such as Raphinha experienced career-best form, with the Brazilian winger recording 20 goal involvements in the 2024–25 UEFA Champions League group stage alone, breaking Lionel Messi's previous club record.

Although his aggressive offside tactics and high line occasionally leave the team vulnerable to counterattacks, Flick's commitment to a proactive, high-risk style has been credited with restoring both identity and intensity to Barcelona's tactical DNA.

Despite achieving significant success at club level with Bayern Munich and Barcelona, Flick's tenure with the German national team was comparatively underwhelming, marked by early exits and inconsistent performances. Analysts attributed this contrast to the structural differences between club and international football. Flick's preferred high-pressing, vertical and transition-heavy 4–2–3–1 system relies on intense positional drilling and automated coordination, which proved difficult to implement in the limited training windows of international management.

== Personal life ==
Flick has been married to Silke Flick since 1987, having originally met as teenagers. They have two daughters and two grandchildren. Flick is a Roman Catholic.

In 2022, At the proposal of the CDU parliamentary group in the Landtag of Baden-Württemberg, Flick was a member of the 17th Federal Convention, at which Frank-Walter Steinmeier was re-elected as President of Germany.

Flick's father died on 10 May 2026, a few hours before Barcelona won 2–0 against Real Madrid in El Clásico, and clinched the 2025–26 La Liga title.

== Managerial statistics ==
As of match played 22 November 2026

Managerial record by team and tenure
Team	From	To	Record								
Team	From	To	M	W	D	L	GF	GA	GD	Win %	Ref.
Victoria Bammental (Note: Statistics do not include regional cup competitions.)	1 July 1996	30 June 2000	122	44	33	45	205	218	−13	36.07	
TSG 1899 Hoffenheim	1 July 2000	19 November 2005	196	88	46	62	345	263	+82	44.90	
Bayern Munich	3 November 2019	30 June 2021	86	70	9	7	255	85	+170	81.40	
Germany	1 July 2021	10 September 2023	25	12	7	6	60	30	+30	48.00	
Barcelona	29 May 2024	Present	134	103	10	21	388	159	+229	76.87	
Career total			563	317	105	141	1,248	753	+495	56.31	

== Honours ==
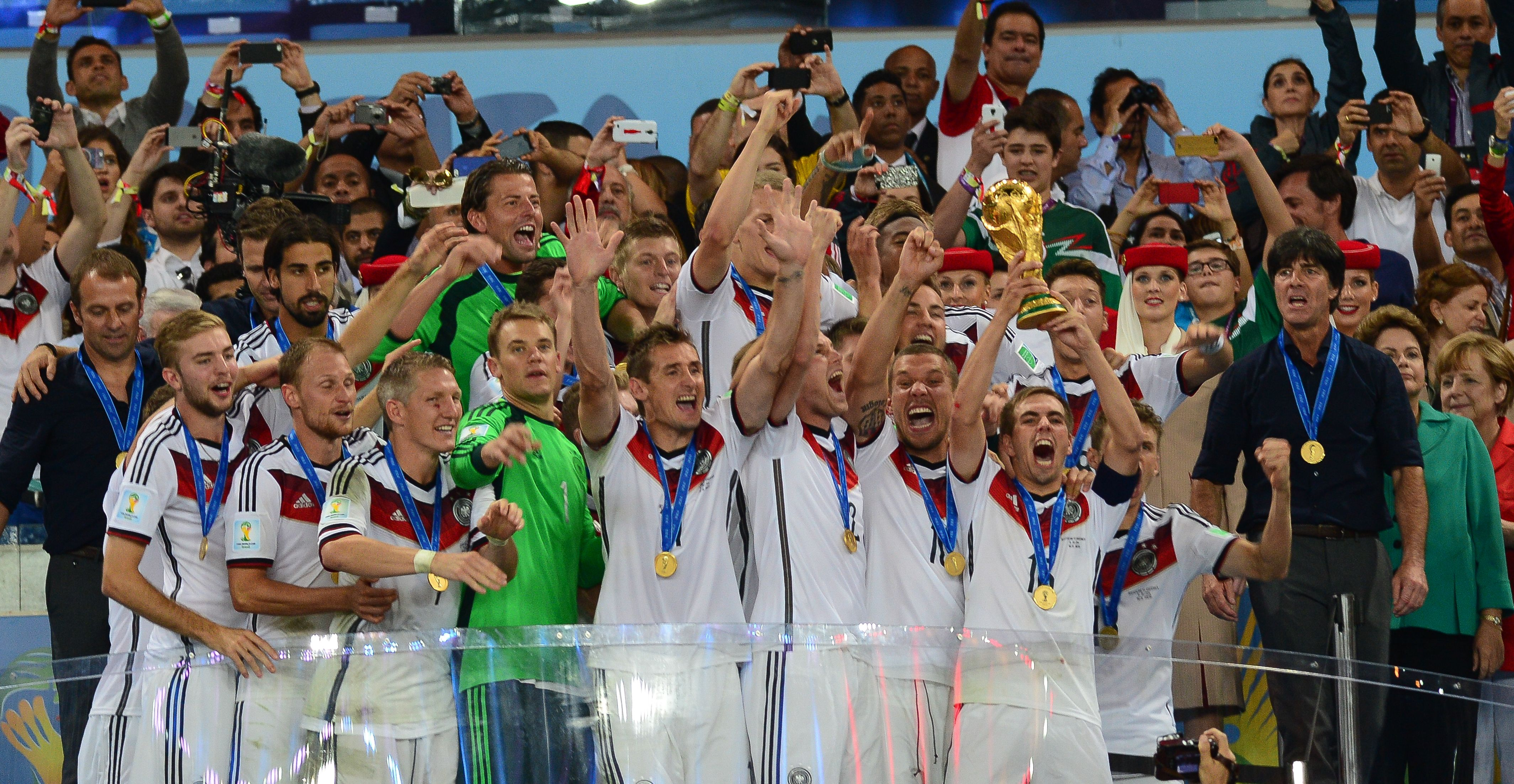
Flick (far left) celebrating winning the 2014 FIFA World Cup

=== Player ===
SV Sandhausen

- North Baden Cup: 1982–83, 1984–85

Bayern Munich

- Bundesliga: 1985–86, 1986–87, 1988–89, 1989–90
- DFB-Pokal: 1985–86
- DFB-Supercup: 1987

=== Assistant Manager ===
Germany

- FIFA World Cup: 2014; third place: 2010
- UEFA European Championship runner-up: 2008

=== Manager ===
TSG Hoffenheim

- Oberliga Baden-Württemberg: 2000–01
- North Baden Cup: 2001–02, 2002–03, 2003–04, 2004–05

Bayern Munich

- Bundesliga: 2019–20, 2020–21
- DFB-Pokal: 2019–20
- DFL-Supercup: 2020
- UEFA Champions League: 2019–20
- UEFA Super Cup: 2020
- FIFA Club World Cup: 2020

Barcelona

- La Liga: 2024–25, 2025–26
- Copa del Rey: 2024–25
- Supercopa de España: 2025, 2026

Individual

- UEFA Men's Coach of the Year: 2019–20
- IFFHS World's Best Club Coach: 2020
- World Soccer Men's Manager of the Year 2020
- Globe Soccer Best Coach of the Year: 2020
- German Football Man of the Year: 2020
- German Football Manager of the Year: 2020
- VDV Bundesliga Coach of the Season: 2019–20
- Miguel Muñoz Trophy: 2024-25.
- La Liga Manager of the Season: 2024–25, 2025–26
- La Liga Manager of the Month: August 2024, October 2024, February 2025, March 2026, September 2026

Other

- Silbernes Lorbeerblatt: 2010, 2014
- Bavarian Order of Merit: 2022
- Ramblista d'Honor: 2026
- Sport Values Award: 2026
