= Rainer Scholz =

German footballer (1954–2022)

Personal information
- Date of birth: 3 September 1954
- Place of birth: Grunertshofen, West Germany
- Date of death: 1 July 2022 (aged 67)
- Place of death: Lohr am Main, Germany
- Height: 1.78 m (5 ft 10 in)
- Position: Defender

Senior career*
Years	Team	Apps	(Gls)
1976–1977	SC Fürstenfeldbruck		
1977–1978	Würzburger Kickers		
1978–1983	Hannover 96		
1983–1987	Waldhof Mannheim		
1987–1992	Darmstadt 98		

Managerial career
- 1988–1989: Darmstadt 98
- 1991–1992: Darmstadt 98
- 1993–1994: SV Neckargerach
- 1996–1997: VfR Bürstadt
- 1997: VfL Herzlake
- 1999–2001: BV Cloppenburg (assistant)
- 2000: BV Cloppenburg (carerakter)
- 2010–2014: TSV Partenstein
- 2014–?: FC Weibersbrunn
- * Club domestic league appearances and goals

Rainer Scholz (3 September 1954 – 1 July 2022) was a German football player and manager who played as a defender.
