= Norbert Eder =

German footballer (1955–2019)

Personal information
- Full name: Norbert Alban Eder
- Date of birth: 7 November 1955
- Place of birth: Bibergau, West Germany
- Date of death: 2 November 2019 (aged 63)
- Height: 1.78 m (5 ft 10 in)
- Position: Defender

Youth career
- 1963–1973: VfR Bibergau
- 1973–1974: 1. FC Nürnberg

Senior career*
Years	Team	Apps	(Gls)
1974–1984	1. FC Nürnberg	301	(27)
1984–1988	Bayern Munich	132	(6)
1988–1989	FC Zürich	25	(2)
Total		458	(35)

International career
1975–1978	West Germany amateur	15	(2)
1980	West Germany B	1	(0)
1986	West Germany	9	(0)

Managerial career
- 1992–1994: DJK Rosenheim
- 1995–1996: DJK Rosenheim
- 1996–1997: FC Garmisch-Partenirchen
- 2006–2008: TSV 1860 Rosenheim
- 2008: TuS Holzkirchen
- * Club domestic league appearances and goals

Norbert Alban Eder (7 November 1955 – 2 November 2019) was a German footballer who played mainly as a defender.

In a 14-year professional career, he played in 433 games (33 goals) both major levels of German football combined (286/11 in the Bundesliga), representing 1. FC Nürnberg and Bayern Munich.

Eder appeared with West Germany at the 1986 World Cup.

== Club career ==
Born in Bibergau, Dettelbach, Eder joined 1. FC Nürnberg's youth system at the age of 17. The following year, he was promoted to the first team, going on to appear in four consecutive second division seasons, achieving promotion to the Bundesliga in 1977–78 but being immediately relegated back; during his first years, he played mostly as a midfielder.

In the 1984 summer, aged almost 29, Eder signed with FC Bayern Munich, for 150,000 Deutsche Mark. During his four-year spell, he never played in less than 32 league games, going on to win three consecutive national championships. In the 1986–87 season, he appeared in 44 official games, including nine in the season's European Cup – he played the full 90 minutes in the final 1–2 loss against F.C. Porto in Vienna.

Eder retired in June 1989, after one year in Switzerland with FC Zürich. In the following decades he worked as a manager, exclusively in amateur football.

== International career ==
Eder made his debut for West Germany on 11 May 1986, in a friendly game with Yugoslavia played in Bochum (1–1).

He was picked by manager Franz Beckenbauer for that year's FIFA World Cup, playing all the matches and minutes for the Mannschaft – save for five minutes in the quarterfinals against Mexico – as it finished runner-up.

== Honours ==
1. FC Nürnberg

- 2. Bundesliga: 1979–80
- DFB-Pokal: runner-up 1981–82

Bayern Munich

- Bundesliga: 1984–85, 1985–86, 1986–87
- DFB-Pokal: 1985–86; runner-up 1984–85
- European Cup: runner-up 1986–87
- DFB-Supercup: 1987

Germany

- FIFA World Cup: runner-up 1986
