= Waldstadion Homburg =

Football stadium in Homburg, Germany

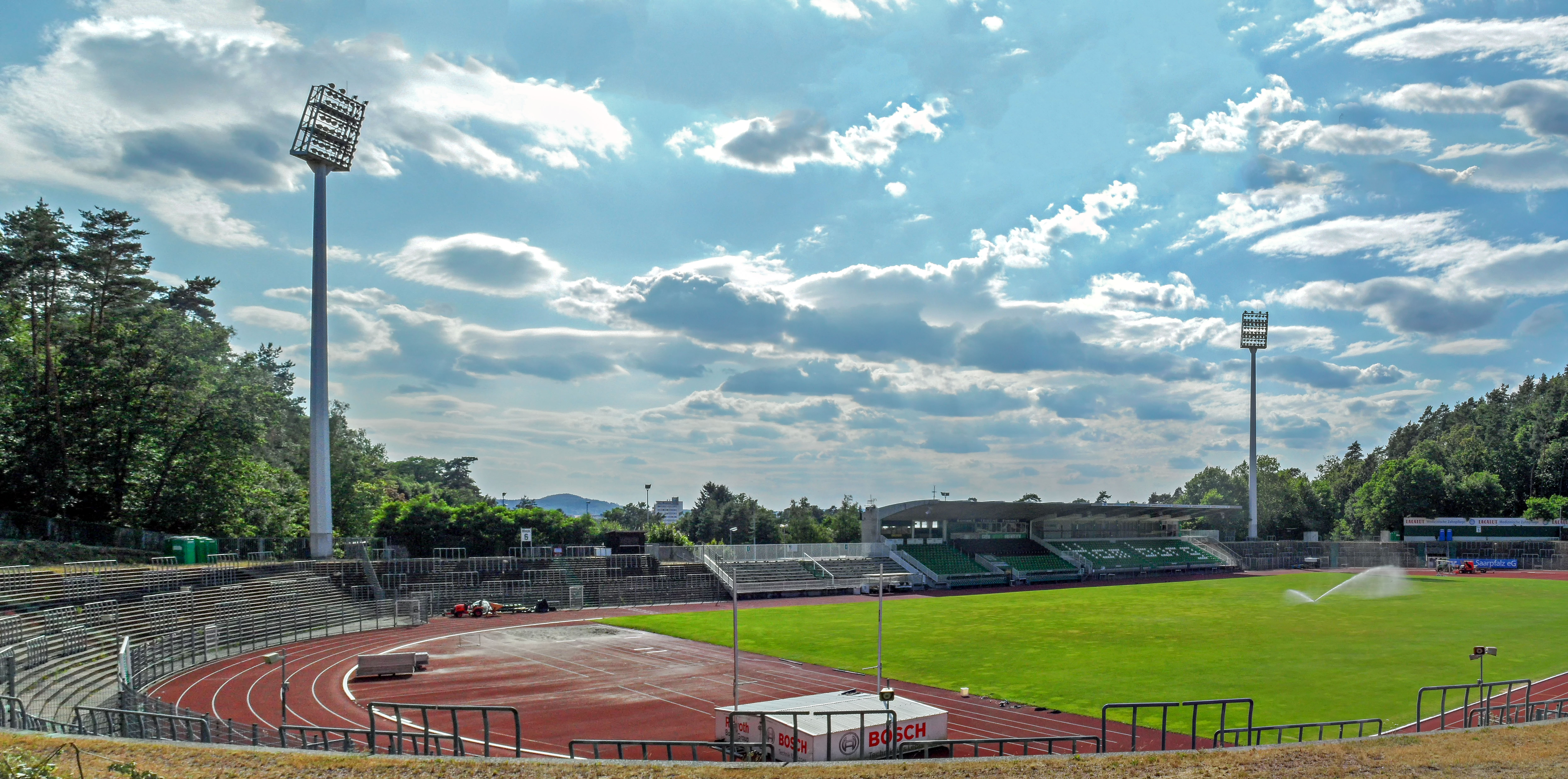
- Interactive map of Waldstadion Homburg
- Full name: Waldstadion Homburg
- Former names: Hauptkampfbahn
- Location: Homburg, Germany
- Coordinates: 49°18′58″N 7°21′18″E
- Owner: City of Homburg
- Operator: FC 08 Homburg
- Capacity: 16,488

Construction
- Opened: 1937
- Renovated: 1986
- Architect: Willy Schwilling

Tenant
- FC 08 Homburg

The Waldstadion Homburg is the home stadium of Regionalliga Südwest club FC 08 Homburg. It has a spectator capacity of 16,488. In the three seasons — 1986–87, 1987–88 and 1989–90 — that Homburg was in the Bundesliga, the average attendance was about 8,000 per game.
