= Ralf Dusend =

German footballer

Personal information
- Date of birth: 28 September 1959 (age 67)
- Place of birth: Neuss, West Germany
- Height: 1.78 m (5 ft 10 in)
- Position: Midfielder

Youth career
- Kleinenbroich

Senior career*
Years	Team	Apps	(Gls)
1977–1987	Fortuna Düsseldorf	239	(40)
1987–1991	1. FC Nürnberg	70	(2)

International career
1979–1980	Germany U-21	6	(1)
- * Club domestic league appearances and goals

Ralf Dusend (born 28 September 1959) is a retired German football player.

== Honours ==
- UEFA Cup Winners' Cup finalist: 1978–79
- DFB-Pokal winner: 1978–79, 1979–80
- DFB-Pokal finalist: 1977–78
