= 1985–86 DFB-Pokal =

Tournament details
- Country: West Germany
- Teams: 64

Final positions
- Champions: Bayern Munich
- Runners-up: VfB Stuttgart

Tournament statistics
- Matches played: 67

The 1985–86 DFB-Pokal was the 43rd season of the annual German football cup competition. It began on 24 August 1985 and ended on 3 May 1986. 64 teams competed in the tournament of six rounds. In their third consecutive final Bayern Munich defeated VfB Stuttgart 5–2.

== Matches ==
=== First round ===
24 August 1985
1. FC Kaiserslautern	3 – 1	Eintracht Frankfurt
VfL Bochum	3 – 2	Hamburger SV
VfB Stuttgart	6 – 3	Eintracht Braunschweig
Hannover 96	3 – 1	SC Freiburg
SG Wattenscheid 09	2 – 5	Borussia Mönchengladbach
Kickers Offenbach	1 – 3	FC Bayern Munich
SV Weil	0 – 7	SV Werder Bremen
SpVgg Ansbach 09	0 – 3	SV Waldhof Mannheim
TSV 1860 München	2 – 4	1. FC Köln
VfR 1910 Bürstadt	1 – 3	Bayer Uerdingen
Altonaer FC 93	2 – 3	Fortuna Düsseldorf	(AET)
Sportfreunde Eisbachtal	1 – 2	FC Schalke 04
SC Neukirchen 1899	2 – 9	Borussia Dortmund
Göttingen 05	1 – 6	1. FC Saarbrücken
FV Ebingen	2 – 7	1. FC Nürnberg
Blau-Weiß 90 Berlin	3 – 0	Fortuna Köln
Alemannia Aachen	1 – 0	Tennis Borussia Berlin
Eintracht Trier	3 – 0	Karlsruher SC
1. FC Achterberg	0 – 2	VfL Osnabrück
Wuppertaler SV	2 – 3	KSV Hessen Kassel
Borussia Neunkirchen	3 – 2	Rot-Weiß Oberhausen
Bremer SV	1 – 3	MSV Duisburg
SV 1916 Sandhausen	1 – 0	SG Union Solingen
FC Wangen	2 – 1	SV Darmstadt 98
FC St. Pauli	2 – 0	Arminia Bielefeld	(AET)
SpVgg Plattling	2 – 0	Itzehoer SV 1909
VfR Langelsheim	2 – 5	DSC Wanne-Eickel
TuS Paderborn-Neuhaus	5 – 3	1. FC Köln II
Vfl Erp	1 – 2	SSV Ulm 1846
FC Erbach	2 – 1	SC Birkenfeld
Stuttgarter Kickers	3 – 3	FC 08 Homburg	(AET)
Hertha BSC	2 – 5	Bayer 04 Leverkusen

==== Replay ====
11 September 1985
FC 08 Homburg	4 – 1	Stuttgarter Kickers

=== Second round ===
17 October 1985
1. FC Nürnberg	0 – 1	VfB Stuttgart
FC Schalke 04	3 – 1	Borussia Mönchengladbach
1. FC Kaiserslautern	4 – 1	1. FC Köln	(AET)
1. FC Saarbrücken	1 – 3	FC Bayern Munich
SV Waldhof Mannheim	4 – 1	VfL Osnabrück
Hannover 96	2 – 1	KSV Hessen Kassel
SpVgg Plattling	0 – 2	Bayer 04 Leverkusen
TuS Paderborn-Neuhaus	2 – 4	Borussia Dortmund
DSC Wanne-Eickel	0 – 4	SV Werder Bremen
Alemannia Aachen	4 – 3	MSV Duisburg	(AET)
FC Erbach	0 – 1	Blau-Weiß 90 Berlin
Borussia Neunkirchen	1 – 3	FC 08 Homburg
SSV Ulm 1846	5 – 2	FC St. Pauli
SV 1916 Sandhausen	4 – 1	FC Wangen
Eintracht Trier	0 – 0	Bayer Uerdingen	(AET)
Fortuna Düsseldorf	1 – 1	VfL Bochum	(AET)

==== Replays ====
29 October 1985
Bayer Uerdingen	0 – 3	Eintracht Trier
30 October 1985
VfL Bochum	3 – 1	Fortuna Düsseldorf	(PSO)

=== Round of 16 ===
12 November 1985
SV Waldhof Mannheim	5 – 1	Hannover 96
VfB Stuttgart	2 – 0	SV Werder Bremen
VfL Bochum	1 – 1	FC Bayern Munich	(AET)
Alemannia Aachen	1 – 2	FC Schalke 04	(AET)
16 November 1985
FC 08 Homburg	1 – 3	Borussia Dortmund	(AET)
Eintracht Trier	1 – 3	Bayer 04 Leverkusen	(AET)
20 November 1985
SV 1916 Sandhausen	3 – 2	Blau-Weiß 90 Berlin
21 December 1985
SSV Ulm 1846	3 – 4	1. FC Kaiserslautern	(AET)

==== Replay ====
18 December 1985
FC Bayern Munich	2 – 0	VfL Bochum

=== Quarter-finals ===
19 December 1985
Bayer 04 Leverkusen	0 – 1	SV Waldhof Mannheim
21 December 1985
SV 1916 Sandhausen	1 – 3	Borussia Dortmund
VfB Stuttgart	6 – 2	FC Schalke 04
22 January 1986
1. FC Kaiserslautern	0 – 3	FC Bayern Munich

=== Semi-finals ===
25 March 1986
SV Waldhof Mannheim	0 – 2	FC Bayern Munich
25 March 1986
VfB Stuttgart	4 – 1	Borussia Dortmund

=== Final ===
3 May 1986
18:00 CEST

Bayern Munich	5–2	VfB Stuttgart
Wohlfarth 33', 42', 76'; Rummenigge 64', 72'	Report	Buchwald 76'; Klinsmann 85'

Olympiastadion, West Berlin
Attendance: 76,000
Referee: Dieter Pauly (Rheydt)
