= 1984–85 FC Bayern Munich season =

85th season in existence of Bayern Munich

FC Bayern Munich
1984–85 season
- Manager: Udo Lattek
- Bundesliga: 1st
- Cup Winners' Cup: Semi-final
- DFB-Pokal: Runner-up
- Top goalscorer: League: Lothar Matthäus (16); All: Norbert Nachtweih (18)
Home colours	Away colours

The 1984–85 FC Bayern Munich season was the 85th season in the club's history. Bayern Munich won its seventh Bundesliga title, reached the semi-final of UEFA Cup Winners' Cup, and finished as runner-up of DFB-Pokal. This season was the second season of Udo Lattek's second stint as manager of the club. The Bundesliga campaign started 25 August 1984 with a 3-1 victory over Arminia Bielefeld. Bayern Munich, 1. FC Köln, and Borussia Mönchengladbach were tied for first place after Round 1. From Round 2 through Round 34 of the season, Bayern Munich were the lone team in first place. Qualification for the 1984–85 European Cup Winners' Cup was a result of winning the 1983–84 DFB-Pokal.

== Players ==
=== Squad, appearances and goals ===
No.	Pos	Nat	Player	Total		Bundesliga		Cup Winners' Cup		DFB-Pokal	
No.	Pos	Nat	Player	Apps	Goals	Apps	Goals	Apps	Goals	Apps	Goals
	GK	(West Germany) FRG	Raimond Aumann	24	0	20	0	2	0	2	0
	GK	(Belgium) BEL	Jean-Marie Pfaff	24	0	14	0	6	0	4	0
	DF	(West Germany) FRG	Norbert Eder	48	2	34	2	8	0	6	0
	DF	(West Germany) FRG	Klaus Augenthaler (captain)	46	7	32	5	8	1	6	1
	MF	(West Germany) FRG	Wolfgang Dremmler	41	1	29	1	7	0	5	0
	DF	(West Germany) FRG	Hans Pflügler	25	2	17	2	4	0	4	0
	DF	(West Germany) FRG	Bertram Beierlorzer	16	0	12	0	2	0	2	0
	DF	(West Germany) FRG	Bernd Martin	11	0	8	0	1	0	2	0
	MF	(West Germany) FRG	Lothar Matthäus	44	17	33	16	5	1	6	0
	MF	(West Germany) FRG	Holger Willmer	42	4	29	3	7	0	6	1
	MF	(Denmark) DEN	Søren Lerby	40	8	28	6	6	0	6	2
	MF	(West Germany) FRG	Norbert Nachtweih	35	5	25	3	6	0	4	2
	MF	(West Germany) FRG	Bernd Dürnberger	24	2	20	2	4	0	0	0
	MF	(West Germany) FRG	Wolfgang Grobe	3	1	3	1	0	0	0	0
	MF	(West Germany) FRG	Karl Del'Haye	3	0	0	0	3	0	0	0
	FW	(West Germany) FRG	Roland Wohlfarth	42	18	32	12	5	3	5	3
	FW	(West Germany) FRG	Ludwig Kögl	39	1	27	1	7	0	5	0
	FW	(West Germany) FRG	Michael Rummenigge	35	9	24	5	6	2	5	2
	FW	(West Germany) FRG	Dieter Hoeneß	31	12	20	7	7	2	4	3
	FW	(West Germany) FRG	Reinhold Mathy	30	8	24	7	3	0	3	1
	FW	(West Germany) FRG	Hans-Werner Grünwald	1	0	0	0	1	0	0	0

=== Goals ===
Pos.	Player	BL	CWC	Cup	Overall
1	(West Germany) Roland Wohlfarth	12	3	3	18
2	(West Germany) Lothar Matthäus	16	1	0	17
3	(West Germany) Dieter Hoeneß	7	2	3	12
4	(West Germany) Michael Rummenigge	5	2	2	9
5	(West Germany) Reinhold Mathy	7	0	1	8
5	(Denmark) Søren Lerby	6	0	2	8

=== Bookings ===
N	Pos.	Nat.	Name	Yellow card	Second yellow card	Red card	Notes
	MF	(Denmark)	Søren Lerby	9			
	DF	(West Germany)	Klaus Augenthaler	8			
	MF	(West Germany)	Wolfgang Dremmler	6		1	
	MF	(West Germany)	Lothar Matthäus	4		1	
	MF	(West Germany)	Norbert Nachtweih	4			
	FW	(West Germany)	Roland Wohlfarth	3			
	DF	(West Germany)	Hans Pflügler	3			
	FW	(West Germany)	Dieter Hoeneß	3			
	DF	(West Germany)	Norbert Eder	2			
	GK	(West Germany)	Raimond Aumann	1			
	DF	(West Germany)	Bertram Beierlorzer	1			
	DF	(West Germany)	Bernd Martin			1	
	MF	(West Germany)	Bernd Dürnberger	1			
	FW	(West Germany)	Michael Rummenigge	1			
	FW	(West Germany)	Ludwig Kögl	1			
	FW	(West Germany)	Reinhold Mathy	1			

Source: Kicker
Only competitive matches
(yellow card) = Number of bookings; (second yellow card) = Number of sending offs after a second yellow card; (red card) = Number of sending offs by a direct red card.

== Transfers ==
=== In ===
First Team

No.	Pos.	Nat.	Name	Age	EU	Moving from	Type	Transfer window	Ends	Transfer fee	Source
	DF	(West Germany)	Lothar Matthäus	23	EU	Borussia Mönchengladbach	Transfer	Summer		€1,200,000	
	DF	(West Germany)	Norbert Eder	28	EU	1. FC Nürnberg	Transfer	Summer		€75,000	
	MF	(West Germany)	Ludwig Kögl	18	EU	1860 Munich	Transfer	Summer		Undisclosed	
	FW	(West Germany)	Roland Wohlfarth	21	EU	MSV Duisburg	Transfer	Summer		Undisclosed	
	DF	(West Germany)	Holger Willmer	25	EU	1. FC Köln	Transfer	Summer		Undisclosed	

Total spending: ▼€1.275m

=== Out ===
First Team

No.	Pos.	Nat.	Name	Age	EU	Moving to	Type	Transfer window	Transfer fee	Source
	FW	(West Germany)	Karl-Heinz Rummenigge	28	EU	Internazionale (Italy)	Transfer	Summer	€5,500,000	
	GK	(West Germany)	Manfred Müller	36	EU		End of career^{1}	Summer	N/A	
	DF	(West Germany)	Reiner Maurer	24	EU	VfB Stuttgart	Transfer	Summer	Undisclosed	
	MF	(West Germany)	Wolfgang Kraus	30	EU	Zürich (Switzerland)	Transfer	Summer	Undisclosed	

Total income: ▲€5.5m

Notes

- Note 1: Manfred Müller retired at the end of the 1983–84 season before making a return for one game in November 1986 for 1. FC Nürnberg.

=== Totals ===
Period	Spending	Income	Loss/Gain
Summer	▼€1.275m	▲€5.5m	▲€4.225m
Winter	€0	€0	€0
Totals	▼€1.275m	▲€5.5m	▲€4.225m

== Results ==
=== Pre-season ===
19th Joan Gamper Trophy

21 August 1984 Semifinals	Bayern Munich	2–1	Aston Villa	Barcelona, Spain
	M. Rummenigge 71'; Nachtweih 90'	Report	McMahon	Stadium: Camp Nou

22 August 1984 Final	Barcelona	3–1	Bayern Munich	Barcelona, Spain
	Carrasco 10', 27'; Calderé 46'	Report	Wohlfarth 53'	Stadium: Camp Nou

=== Bundesliga ===
25 August 1984 1	Arminia Bielefeld	1–3	Bayern Munich	Bielefeld
15:30 CEST	Reich 56'	Report	Dremmler 17'; Nachtweih 67'; Matthäus 81'	Stadium: Stadion Alm; Attendance: 28,000; Referee: Peter Gabor

29 August 1984 2	Bayern Munich	4–2	Werder Bremen	Munich
20:00 CEST	Rummenigge 15'; Lerby 39', 53', 87'	Report	Pezzey 43'; Neubarth 81'	Stadium: Olympiastadion; Attendance: 40,000; Referee: Manfred Uhlig

8 September 1984 3	Bayer 05 Uerdingen	1–3	Bayern Munich	Krefeld
15:30 CEST	Herget 10'	Report	Wohlfarth 44'; Lerby 76'; Matthäus 88'	Stadium: Grotenburg-Stadion; Attendance: 20,000; Referee: Volker Roth

15 September 1984 4	Bayern Munich	1–0	Borussia Dortmund	Munich
15:30 CEST	Matthäus 61'	Report		Stadium: Olympiastadion; Attendance: 23,000; Referee: Hans-Joachim Osmers

22 September 1984 5	Bayern Munich	2–0	1. FC Köln	Munich
15:30 CEST	Rummenigge 75'; Wohlfarth 90'	Report		Stadium: Olympiastadion; Attendance: 56,000; Referee: Hans-Heinrich Barnick

5 September 1984 6	VfB Stuttgart	1–3	Bayern Munich	Stuttgart
20:00 CEST	Ohlicher 68'	Report	Pflügler 37'; Dürnberger 44'; Wohlfarth 90'	Stadium: Neckarstadion; Attendance: 70,000; Referee: Dieter Pauly

6 October 1984 7	Bayern Munich	1–2	SV Waldhof Mannheim	Munich
15:30 CET	Dürnberger 62'	Report	Schlindwein 67'; Heck 75'	Stadium: Olympiastadion; Attendance: 46,000; Referee: Hans-Peter Dellwing

10 October 1984 8	Fortuna Düsseldorf	0–2	Bayern Munich	Düsseldorf
20:00 CET		Report	Zewe 68' (o.g.); Wohlfarth 77'	Stadium: Rheinstadion; Attendance: 37,000; Referee: Dieter Niebergall

20 October 1984 9	Bayern Munich	4–2	Eintracht Frankfurt	Munich
15:30 CET	Wohlfarth 9', 42'; Rummenigge 39'; Matthäus 82'	Report	Berthold 48'; Kroth 86'	Stadium: Olympiastadion; Attendance: 36,000; Referee: Werner Schütte

27 October 1984 10	FC Schalke 04	1–1	Bayern Munich	Gelsenkirchen
15:30 CET	Dietz 79'	Report	Augenthaler 31'	Stadium: Parkstadion; Attendance: 63,600; Referee: Wilfried Heitmann

3 November 1984 11	Bayern Munich	1–1	Hamburger SV	Munich
15:30 CET	Wohlfarth 36'	Report	von Heesen 87'	Stadium: Olympiastadion; Attendance: 70,000; Referee: Franz-Josef Hontheim

11 December 1984 12	Borussia Mönchengladbach	3–2	Bayern Munich	Mönchengladbach
20:00 CET	Mill 21'; Borowka 27'; Frontzeck 33'	Report	Mathy 24'; Hoeneß 87'	Stadium: Bökelbergstadion; Attendance: 33,000; Referee: Dieter Niebergall

14 November 1984 13	Bayern Munich	2–2	VfL Bochum	Munich
20:00 CET	Grobe 15'; Mathy 18'	Report	Oswald 6'; Kuntz 24' (pen.)	Stadium: Olympiastadion; Attendance: 20,000; Referee: Gerd Zimmermann

17 November 1984 14	Bayer Leverkusen	3–0	Bayern Munich	Leverkusen
15:30 CET	Giske 8'; Röber 64'; Waas 78'	Report		Stadium: Ulrich-Haberland-Stadion; Attendance: 14,000; Referee: Werner Föckler

24 November 1984 15	Bayern Munich	6–2	Karlsruher SC	Munich
15:30 CET	Mathy 10', 30'; Matthäus 33'; Lerby 47' (pen.), 70'; Augenthaler 85'	Report	Becker 19', 68'	Stadium: Olympiastadion; Attendance: 16,000; Referee: Rüdiger Wuttke

1 December 1984 16	1. FC Kaiserslautern	0–1	Bayern Munich	Kaiserslautern
15:30 CET		Report	Lerby (penalty missed) 29'; Matthäus 42'	Stadium: Betzenbergstadion; Attendance: 34,000; Referee: Hans-Joachim Osmers

8 December 1984 17	Bayern Munich	3–0	Eintracht Braunschweig	Munich
15:30 CET	Hoeneß 7'; Matthäus 45' (pen.), 66'	Report		Stadium: Olympiastadion; Attendance: 12,000; Referee: Anton Matheis

2 February 1985 18	Bayern Munich	3–3	Arminia Bielefeld	Munich
15:30 CET	Augenthaler 25'; Lerby 44'; Hoeneß 73'	Report	Dronia 31'; Borchers 60'; Rautiainen 68'	Stadium: Olympiastadion; Attendance: 8,000; Referee: Dr. Wolf-Rüdiger Umbach

9 February 1985 19	Werder Bremen	4–2	Bayern Munich	Bremen
15:30 CET	Völler 8', 71'; Reinders 12' (pen.); Hermann 48'	Report	Nachtweih 44'; Wohlfart 61'	Stadium: Weserstadion; Attendance: 40,500; Referee: Wolf-Dieter Ahlenfelder

26 February 1985 20	Bayern Munich	2–1	Bayer 05 Uerdingen	Munich
20:00 CET	Willmer 34'; Hoeneß 72'	Report	Schäfer 9'	Stadium: Olympiastadion; Attendance: 12,000; Referee: Udo Horeis

2 March 1985 21	Borussia Dortmund	1–1	Bayern Munich	Dortmund
15:30 CET	Anderbrügge 7'	Report	Matthäus 15' (pen.)	Stadium: Westfalenstadion; Attendance: 33,000; Referee: Peter Gabor

9 March 1985 22	1. FC Köln	0–2	Bayern Munich	Cologne
15:30 CET		Report	Hoeneß 28'; Matthäus 89'	Stadium: Müngersdorfer Stadion; Attendance: 45,000; Referee: Gerhard Theobald

16 March 1985 23	Bayern Munich	3–2	VfB Stuttgart	Munich
15:30 CET	Lerby 53'; Mathy 73'; Matthäus 74' (pen.)	Report	Ohlicher 41'; Allgöwer 46'	Stadium: Olympiastadion; Attendance: 44,000; Referee: Karl-Heinz Tritschler

23 March 1985 24	SV Waldhof Mannheim	0–0	Bayern Munich	Südweststadion
15:30 CET		Report		Attendance: 39,500; Referee: Robert Walz

30 March 1985 25	Bayern Munich	6–0	Fortuna Düsseldorf	Munich
15:30 CET	Lerby 20', 83'; Mathy 22'; Augenthaler 50', 73'; Matthäus 69'	Report		Stadium: Olympiastadion; Attendance: 17,000; Referee: Kurt Röthlisberger

3 April 1985 26	Eintracht Frankfurt	2–2	Bayern Munich	Frankfurt
20:00 CEST	Berthold 49'; Tobollik 69'	Report	Rummenigge 80'; Eder 85'	Stadium: Waldstadion; Attendance: 61,000; Referee: Karl-Josef Assenmacher

13 April 1985 27	Bayern Munich	3–0	FC Schalke 04	Munich
15:30 CEST	Nactweih 41'; Willmer 61'; Wohlfarth 78'	Report		Stadium: Olympiastadion; Attendance: 22,000; Referee: Wolf-Günter Wiesel

20 April 1985 28	Hamburger SV	2–1	Bayern Munich	Hamburg
15:30 CEST	Plessers 5'; McGhee 21'	Report	Wohlfarth 50'	Stadium: Volksparkstadion; Attendance: 61,418; Referee: Dieter Pauly

4 May 1985 29	Bayern Munich	4–0	Borussia Mönchengladbach	Munich
15:30 CEST	Hoeneß 34'; Matthäus 48'; Wohlfarth 64'; Mathy 78'	Report		Stadium: Olympiastadion; Attendance: 75,000; Referee: Volker Roth

11 May 1985 30	VfL Bochum	1–1	Bayern Munich	Bochum
15:30 CEST	Benatelli 70'	Report	Matthäus 28'	Stadium: Ruhrstadion; Attendance: 42,000; Referee: Franz-Josef Hontheim

18 May 1985 31	Bayern Munich	2–1	Bayer Leverkusen	Munich
15:30 CEST	Eder 43'; Willmer 58'	Report	Götz 38'	Stadium: Olympiastadion; Attendance: 25,000; Referee: Dieter Niebergall

21 May 1985 32	Karlsruher SC	0–4	Bayern Munich	Karlsruhe
20:00 CEST		Report	Matthäus 40'; Kögl 46'; Lerby 77'; Rummenigge 90' (pen.)	Stadium: Wildparkstadion; Attendance: 32,000; Referee: Joachim Kautschor

1 June 1985 33	Bayern Munich	3–0	1. FC Kaiserslautern	Munich
15:30 CEST	Matthäus 38'; Wohlfarth 51'; Pflügler 75'	Report		Stadium: Olympiastadion; Attendance: 35,000; Referee: Werner Schütte

8 June 1985 34	Eintracht Braunschweig	0–1	Bayern Munich	Braunschweig
15:30 CEST		Report	Hoeneß 49'	Stadium: Eintracht-Stadion; Attendance: 33,071; Referee: Karl-Josef Assenmacher

==== Results by round ====
Round	1	2	3	4	5	6	7	8	9	10	11	12	13	14	15	16	17	18	19	20	21	22	23	24	25	26	27	28	29	30	31	32	33	34
Ground	A	H	A	H	H	A	H	A	H	A	H	A	H	A	H	A	H	H	A	H	A	A	H	A	H	A	H	A	H	A	H	A	H	A
Result	W	W	W	W	W	W	L	W	W	D	D	L	D	L	W	W	W	D	L	W	D	W	W	D	W	D	W	L	W	D	W	W	W	W
Position	1	1	1	1	1	1	1	1	1	1	1	1	1	1	1	1	1	1	1	1	1	1	1	1	1	1	1	1	1	1	1	1	1	1

Source: Kicker
A = Away; H = Home; W = Win; D = Draw; L = Loss

=== DFB Pokal ===
2 September 1984 1st Round	BV Lüttringhausen	0–1	Bayern Munich	Remscheid
		Report	Wohlfarth	Stadium: Röntgen-Stadion; Attendance: 15,000; Referee: Günter Risse (Hattingen)

21 November 1984 2nd round	TSV Friesen Hänigsen	0–8	Bayern Munich
		Report	Rummenigge 28', 67'; Augenthaler 31'; Hoeneß 44'; Lerby 52'; Nachtweih 56', 58'; Willmer 85'	Attendance: 16,000; Referee: Wahlmann (Recklinghausen)

4 December 1984 3rd round	Bayern Munich	1–0	SV Waldhof Mannheim	Munich
	Hoeneß 73'	Report		Stadium: Olympiastadion; Attendance: 12,500; Referee: Wolf-Dieter Ahlenfelder (Oberhausen)

26 March 1985 Quarter-finals	Bayer Leverkusen	1–3	Bayern Munich
	Cha 53'	Report	Wohlfarth 4', 40'; Mathy 71'	Attendance: 17,000; Referee: Franz-Josef Hontheim (Trier)

8 April 1985 Semi-finals	Bayern Munich	1–0 (a.e.t.)	Borussia Mönchengladbach	Munich
	Lerby 101' (pen.)	Report		Stadium: Olympiastadion; Attendance: 52,000; Referee: Wilfried Heitmann (Drentwede)

26 May 1985 Final	Bayer Uerdingen	2–1	Bayern Munich	Berlin
	Feilzer 9'; Schäfer 66'	Report	Hoeneß 8'	Stadium: Olympic Stadium (Berlin); Attendance: 70,400; Referee: Werner Föckler (Bad Dürkheim)

=== European Cup Winners' Cup ===
==== 1st round ====
19 September 1984 1st leg	Bayern Munich (West Germany)	4–1	(Norway) Moss FK	Munich, West Germany
	Pflügler 31', 54'; Wohlfarth 69'; Nachtweih 77'	Report	Kollshaugen 2'	Stadium: Olympiastadion; Attendance: 5,000; Referee: Czermarmazowicz (Poland)

3 October 1984 2nd leg	Moss FK (Norway)	1–2 (2–6 agg.)	(West Germany) Bayern Munich	Moss, Norway
	Kollshaugen 83'	Report	Wohlfarth 23'; Rummenigge 48'	Stadium: Melløs Stadion; Attendance: 4,600; Referee: Ruokonen (Finland)

==== 2nd round ====
24 October 1984 1st leg	Bayern Munich (West Germany)	4–1	(Bulgaria) PFC Botev Plovdiv	Munich, West Germany
	Mladenov 8' (o.g.); Wohlfarth 20', 75'; Rummenigge 73'	Report	Georgiev 40'	Stadium: Olympiastadion; Attendance: 9,500; Referee: Lund-Sörensen (Denmark)

7 November 1984 2nd leg	PFC Botev Plovdiv (Bulgaria)	2–0 (3–4 agg.)	(West Germany) Bayern Munich	Plovdiv, Bulgaria
	Pashev 38'; Kostadinov 51' (pen.)	Report		Stadium: Hristo Botev Stadium; Attendance: 25,000; Referee: Casarin (Italy)

==== Quarter-finals ====
6 March 1985 1st leg	Bayern Munich (West Germany)	2–0	(Italy) A.S. Roma	Munich, West Germany
	Augenthaler 44'; Hoeneß 77'	Report		Stadium: Olympiastadion; Attendance: 60,000; Referee: Mark Courtney (England)

20 March 1985 2nd leg	A.S. Roma (Italy)	1–2 (1–4 agg.)	(West Germany) Bayern Munich	Rome, Italy
	Nela 80'	Report	Matthäus 32' (pen.); Kögl 81'	Stadium: Stadio Olimpico; Attendance: 55,400; Referee: Christov (Czechoslovakia)

==== Semi-finals ====
10 April 1985 1st leg	Bayern Munich (West Germany)	0–0	(England) Everton F.C.	Munich, West Germany
		Report		Stadium: Olympiastadion; Attendance: 67,000; Referee: Paolo Bergamo (Italy)

24 April 1985 2nd leg	Everton F.C. (England)	3–1 (3–1 agg.)	(West Germany) Bayern Munich	Liverpool, England
	Sharp 48'; Gray 73'; Steven 86'	Report	Hoeneß 38'	Stadium: Goodison Park; Attendance: 50,000; Referee: Frederiksson (Sweden)
