= Achim Beierlorzer =

German football executive and coach (born 1967)

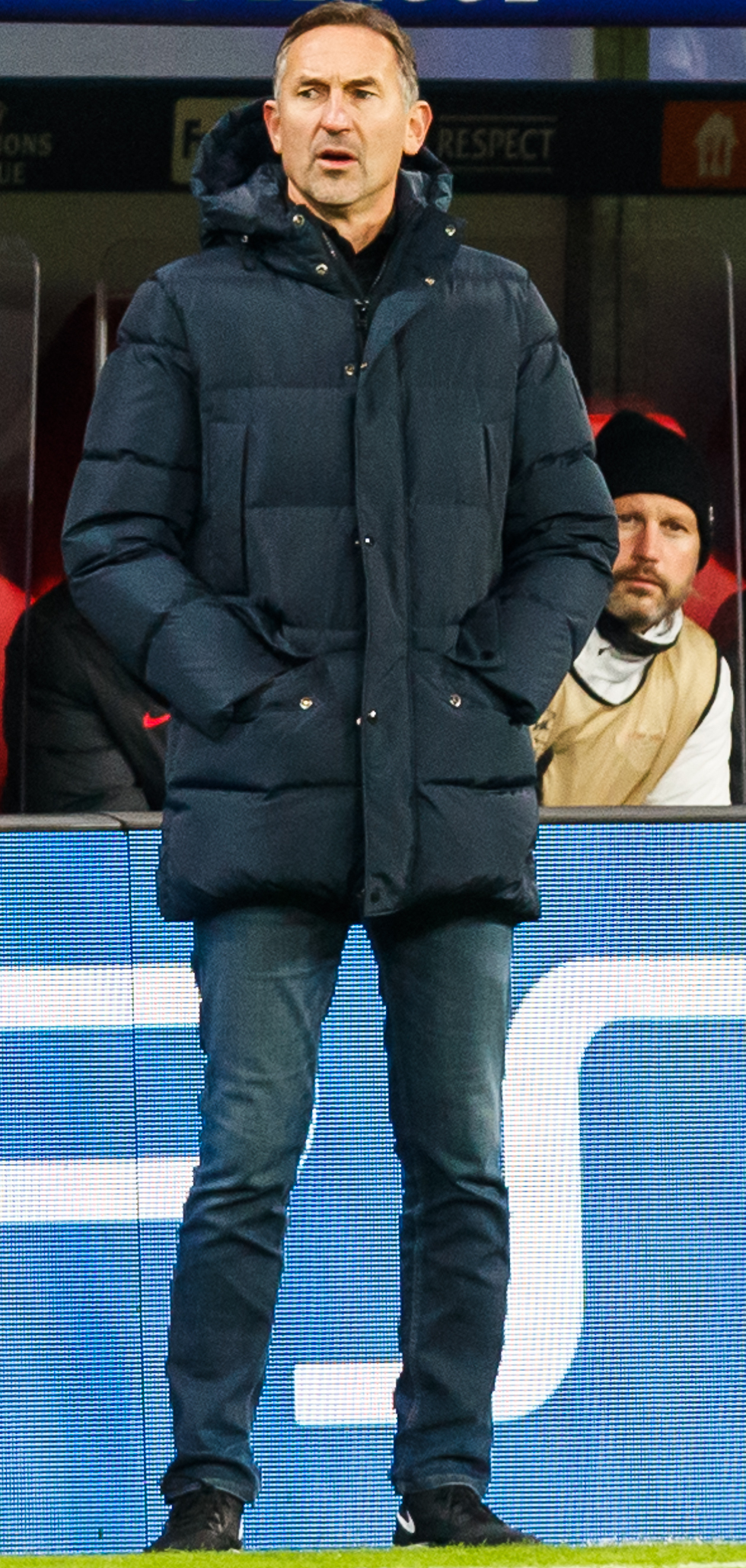
- Beierlorzer in 2021

Personal information
- Date of birth: 20 November 1967 (age 58)
- Place of birth: Erlangen, West Germany
- Height: 1.90 m (6 ft 3 in)
- Position: Midfielder

Team information
- Current team: FC Ingolstadt (head coach)

Youth career
- –1984: TSV Neunkirchen
- 1984–1986: 1. FC Nürnberg

Senior career*
Years	Team	Apps	(Gls)
1986–1988	1. FC Nürnberg II	23	(0)
1988–1989	SpVgg Jahn Forchheim		
1989–1996	Greuther Fürth	190	(44)
1996–2002	SC Schwabach	122	(12)

Managerial career
- 2002–2003: SC 04 Schwabach
- 2004–2010: SV Kleinsendelbach
- 2015: RB Leipzig (interim)
- 2017–2019: Jahn Regensburg
- 2019: 1. FC Köln
- 2019–2020: Mainz 05
- 2021: RB Leipzig (interim)
- 2026–: FC Ingolstadt
Medal record
Representing Germany
Summer Universiade
Bronze medal – third place	1993 Buffalo	Team
- * Club domestic league appearances and goals

Achim Beierlorzer (born 20 November 1967) is a German football executive, and former coach and player who played as a midfielder. He is currently the manager who is the head coach of 3. Liga club FC Ingolstadt. He is the younger brother of Bertram Beierlorzer.

== Playing career ==
Beierlorzer was never a professional football player but played for 1. FC Nürnberg U-19 and the second team.

== Coaching career ==
Beierlorzer started coaching at lower level club SV Kleinsendelbach. From 2010 he managed the U-17 of Greuther Fürth. After that, he had been head coach of the under 17 team for RB Leipzig who he led to table position one in the youth Bundesliga.

Beierlorzer became interim head coach of second Bundesliga side RB Leipzig on 11 February 2015 after Alexander Zorniger's contract was ended mutually. His first match was a 1–0 loss against FSV Frankfurt on 15 February 2015. He managed the team for the remainder of the season and had his final match on 24 May 2015 against Greuther Fürth which Leipzig won 2–0. He was replaced by Ralf Rangnick on 29 May 2015. He was retained as an assistant. He finished with a record of six wins, three draws, and five losses.

On 26 June 2017, he was appointed as the new head coach of Jahn Regensburg. After a successful two-year spell at the club, it was announced that Beierlorzer would be appointed to the vacant head coaching position at 1. FC Köln. He was given a contract until 2021. He was sacked on 9 November 2019. He was appointed as head coach of Mainz 05 on 18 November 2019. After a 4–1 loss against VfB Stuttgart at the start of the 2020–21 Bundesliga season, Beierlorzer was sacked.

On 5 December 2021, Beierlorzer was again appointed interim coach of RB Leipzig after the club and Jesse Marsch parted ways.

In July 2023, Beierlorzer was appointed sporting director of Jahn Regensburg. On 3 October 2025, the club announced his release.

On 25 September 2026, Beierlorzer was appointed head coach of the third-division club FC Ingolstadt 04.

== Coaching record ==
As of match played 7 November 2026

Team	From	To	Record								
Team	From	To	G	W	D	L	GF	GA	GD	Win %	Ref.
RB Leipzig	11 February 2015	29 May 2015	15	6	3	6	17	19	−2	40.00	
Jahn Regensburg	1 July 2017	30 June 2019	71	27	19	25	114	115	−1	38.03	
1. FC Köln	1 July 2019	9 November 2019	13	2	2	9	15	29	−14	15.38	
Mainz 05	18 November 2019	28 September 2020	27	9	4	14	39	47	−8	33.33	
RB Leipzig	5 December 2021	9 December 2021	1	1	0	0	2	1	+1	100.00	
FC Ingolstadt 04	25 September 2026	Present	6	4	1	1	12	8	+4	66.67	
Total			133	49	29	55	199	219	−20	36.84	—
