= Lothar Matthäus =

German footballer (born 1961)

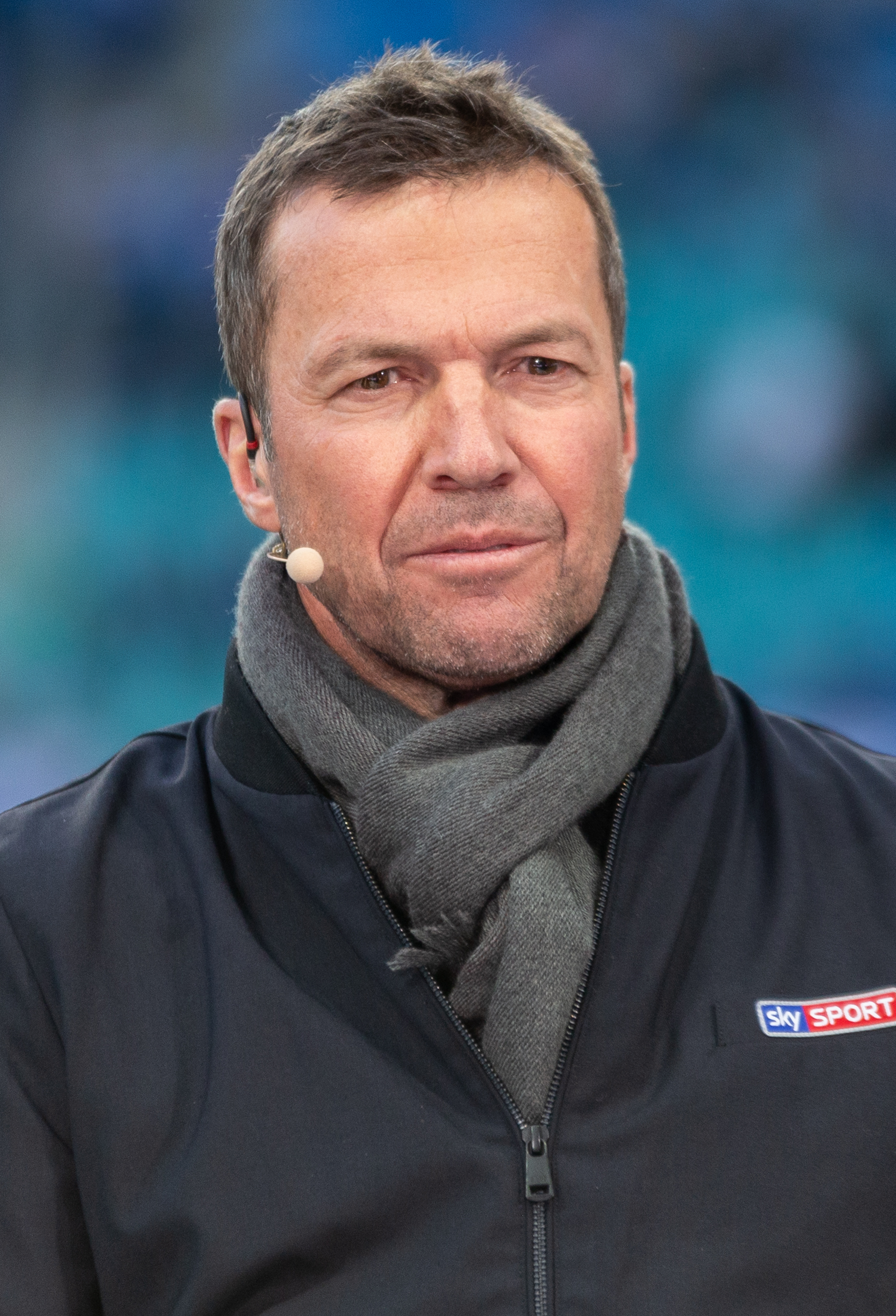
- Matthäus in 2019

Personal information
- Full name: Lothar Herbert Matthäus
- Date of birth: 21 March 1961 (age 65)
- Place of birth: Erlangen, West Germany
- Height: 1.74 m (5 ft 9 in)
- Positions: Midfielder; sweeper

Youth career
- 1971–1979: 1. FC Herzogenaurach

Senior career*
Years	Team	Apps	(Gls)
1979–1984	Borussia Mönchengladbach	162	(36)
1984–1988	Bayern Munich	113	(57)
1988–1992	Inter Milan	115	(40)
1992–2000	Bayern Munich	189	(28)
2000	MetroStars	16	(0)
2018	1. FC Herzogenaurach	1	(0)
Total		618	(181)

International career
1979	West Germany U18	10	(4)
1979–1983	West Germany U21	15	(2)
1979–1981	West Germany B	4	(1)
1980–2000	Germany	150	(23)

Managerial career
- 2001–2002: Rapid Wien
- 2002–2003: Partizan
- 2003–2006: Hungary
- 2006: Atlético Paranaense
- 2006–2007: Red Bull Salzburg (assistant)
- 2008–2009: Maccabi Netanya
- 2010–2011: Bulgaria
Medal record
Men's football
Representing West Germany
FIFA World Cup
Winner	1990 Italy
Runner-up	1982 Spain
Runner-up	1986 Mexico
UEFA European Championship
Winner	1980 Italy
Bronze medal – third place	1988 West Germany
Signature
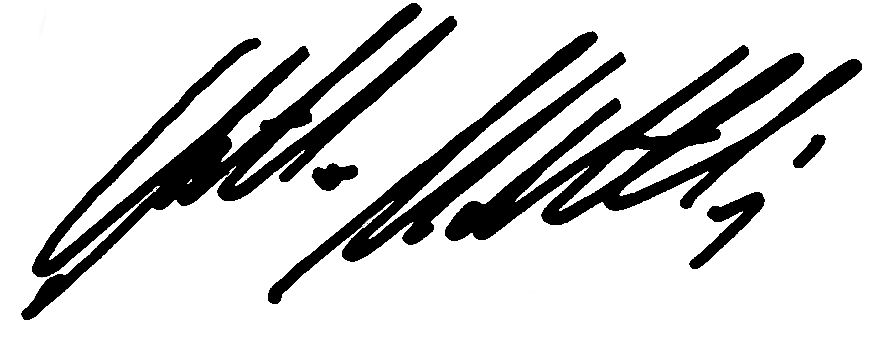
- * Club domestic league appearances and goals

Lothar Herbert Matthäus (German pronunciation: [ˈloːtaʁ maˈtɛːʊs]; born 21 March 1961) is a German football pundit and former professional player and manager. He captained West Germany to victory in the 1990 FIFA World Cup and was awarded the Ballon d'Or. In 1991, he was named the first FIFA World Player of the Year, and remains the only German to have received the award. He was also included in the Ballon d'Or Dream Team in 2020.

Matthäus was the first outfield player, and second overall after Antonio Carbajal, to appear at five FIFA World Cups (1982, 1986, 1990, 1994 and 1998); he remains one of only seven male players to have done so, along with Antonio Carbajal, Rafael Márquez, Lionel Messi, Cristiano Ronaldo, Andrés Guardado, and Luka Modrić. He also won UEFA Euro 1980, and played in the 1984, 1988 and 2000 UEFA European Championships. In 1999, aged 38, Matthäus was again voted German Footballer of the Year, having previously won the award in 1990.

Matthäus is the most capped German player of all time, retiring with a total of 150 appearances (83 for West Germany) in 20 years, and 23 goals.

Including selection teams, he has made over 1,000 appearances in his career.

Matthäus is a member of the FIFA 100 list of the greatest living football players chosen by Pelé. Diego Maradona said of Matthäus, "He is the best rival I've ever had. I guess that's enough to define him."

Matthäus, a versatile and complete player, is regarded as one of the greatest midfielders of all time. He was known for his vision, positional awareness, well-timed tackles, and powerful shooting. During his career, he usually played as a box-to-box midfielder, although late in his career he played as a sweeper.

== Early life ==
Lothar Herbert Matthäus was born on 21 March 1961 in Erlangen, Bavaria, West Germany, to Heinz (1930–2019) and Katharina Matthäus (1931–2020). His father, who was born in southern Silesia, fled west across the Oder in 1944 ahead of the Soviet advance into the region, then worked as a canteen manager, while his mother worked for Puma. He spent his early playing days in the youth team of 1. FC Herzogenaurach, located in a small town in Bavaria close to Nuremberg.

== Club career ==
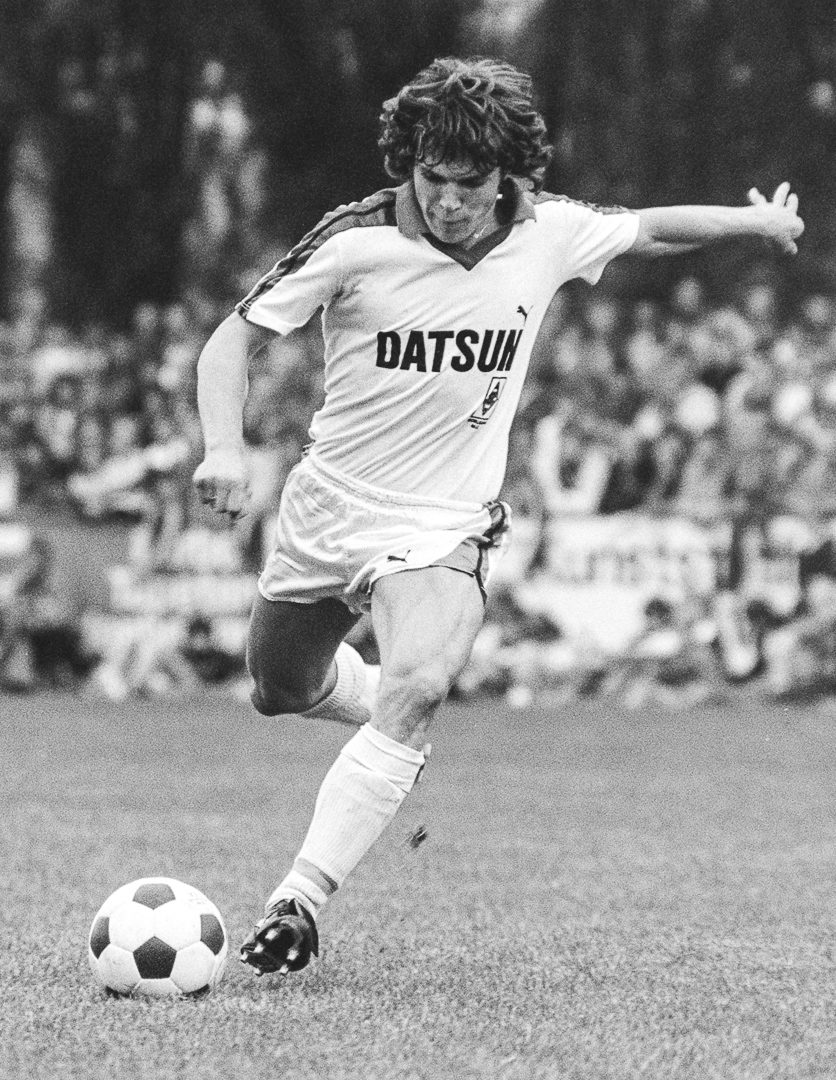
Matthäus playing for Borussia Mönchengladbach in 1981

Matthäus started his professional career in 1979 with Borussia Mönchengladbach of the Bundesliga, for whom he played until 1984. He then played for Bayern Munich from 1984 to 1988, winning the Bundesliga twice and the DFB-Pokal. They also reached the European Cup final in 1987, leading 1–0 for most of the game until two late goals gave FC Porto the win.

Matthäus and Bayern teammate Andreas Brehme signed with Inter Milan of Serie A in 1988, winning the Scudetto in 1988–89 during their first season, and the Italian Supercup that year as well. Matthäus continued to enjoy further success with Inter, winning the UEFA Cup in 1991 and being named FIFA World Player of the Year. In the final, he scored a penalty in the first leg to help them to their victory over Roma.

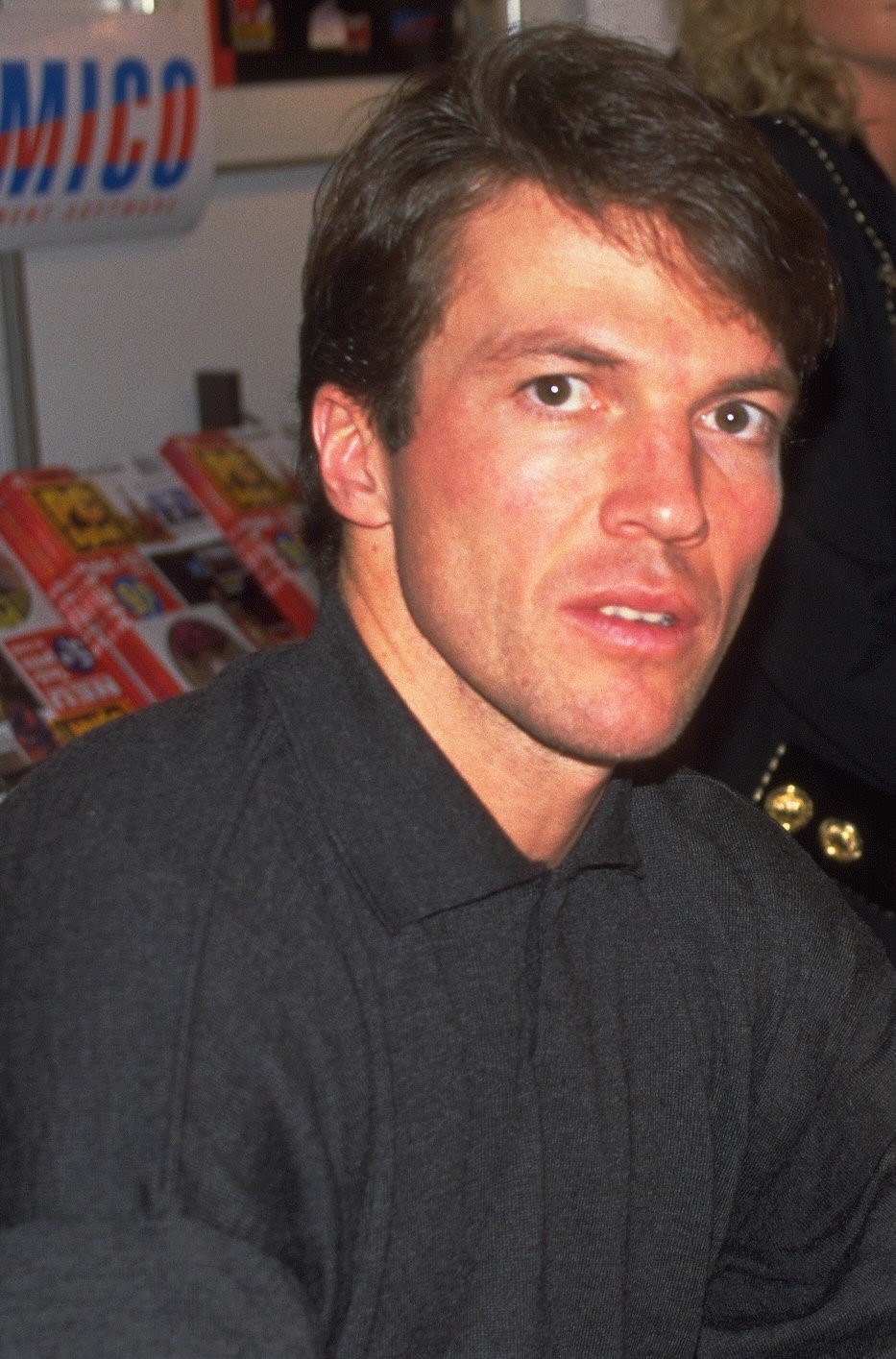
Matthäus during an autograph session at CeBIT in 1995, while a Bayern Munich player

Returning to Bayern Munich in 1992, he won four Bundesliga titles, two DFB-Pokals, another UEFA Cup and reached a second European Cup final in 1999. The only major club football honour which eluded Matthäus, for competitions in which he played, was the UEFA Champions League. Famously, he came within two minutes of picking up a winners' medal in 1999, only to have his hopes dashed by Manchester United, who scored two last-minute goals in the final, after he was substituted in the 80th minute of play while the team was still leading 1–0. When the two teams went to collect their medals Matthäus removed his runners-up medal immediately after he received it – it was the second time he had been on the losing side in a final under similar circumstances; in the 1987 final, Bayern had been leading 1–0 most of the game until two late goals gave FC Porto the win. After Matthäus retired, Bayern would win the Champions League in 2000–01 and later that year the Intercontinental Cup. His last official match for Bayern took place in Munich on 8 March 2000 and was a Champions League match against Real Madrid, which Bayern won 4–1.

During the 1999–2000 season, Matthäus moved from Bayern to New York City's MetroStars team of Major League Soccer in the United States. He played in the US from March to October 2000 and retired from professional football afterwards. During his season with the MetroStars, he traveled to St. Tropez when he was supposed to be rehabbing his back. He ultimately made 16 appearances and scored 0 goals, and is considered one of the largest Europe to MLS busts in league history.

Matthäus came out of retirement in 2018, at age 57, to play 50 minutes of 1. FC Herzogenaurach's final league game of the season. The team had already secured the league title, and the appearance allowed Matthäus to satisfy his ambition retiring with the club where his career started: "It was always my dream to play my last competitive game here."

== International career ==
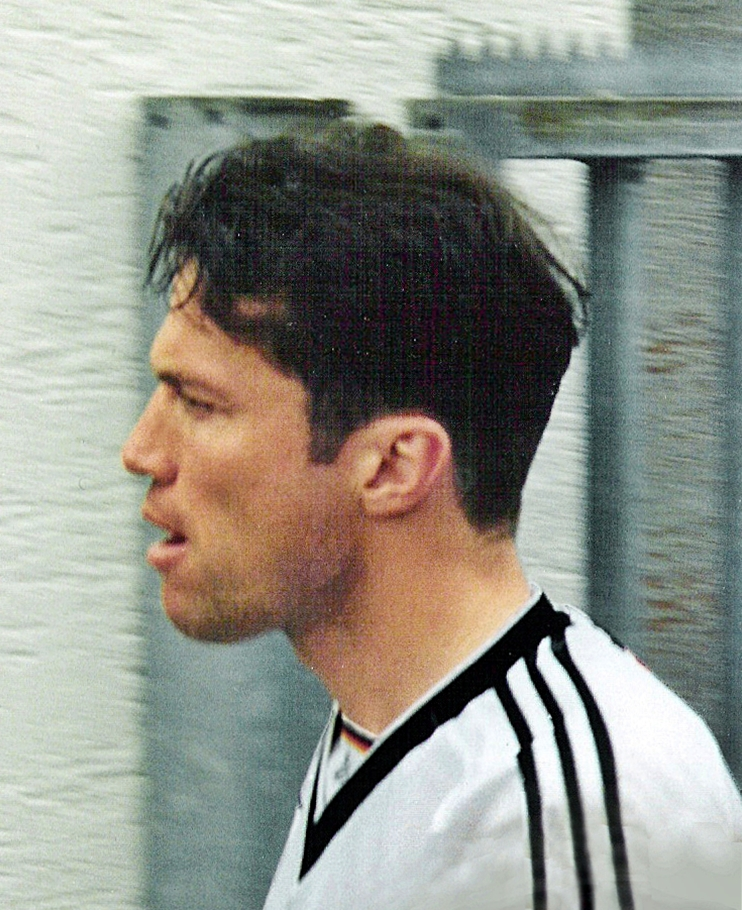
Matthäus (pictured in 1999) has won more international caps than any German with 150 and went to nine major international tournaments, serving as captain of the 1990 World Cup champions.

=== Early international years ===
Matthäus was first called up in 1980 to the West German squad that won UEFA Euro 1980 in Italy, making his international debut during the tournament in a 3–2 first round win against the Netherlands on 14 June; this was his only appearance in this edition of the competition. He also played two games at the 1982 FIFA World Cup in Spain; he was brought on as a substitute in group stage games against Chile and the infamous Disgrace of Gijón game versus Austria, which West Germany won 1–0, allowing both teams to advance from their group. West Germany reached the final, losing to Italy at the Santiago Bernabéu Stadium in Madrid, 3–1.

Matthäus also had a regular place in the national team for the 1986 World Cup in Mexico, scoring the winner in the round of 16 against Morocco. In the final at the Azteca Stadium in Mexico City, despite his considerable play-making ability, he was assigned by coach Franz Beckenbauer to mark Argentina's Diego Maradona. Maradona did not score in the final, but his pass to Jorge Burruchaga with six minutes left in regulation time set up the winning goal for Argentina, and West Germany lost their second consecutive World Cup final, this time 3–2.

At UEFA Euro 1988 on home soil, Matthäus captained the team and scored a penalty against eventual champions Netherlands in the semi-final to give his team a 1–0 lead, but Ronald Koeman leveled the score with a penalty, and then Marco van Basten slid in the winning goal in the final minutes.

=== 1990s ===
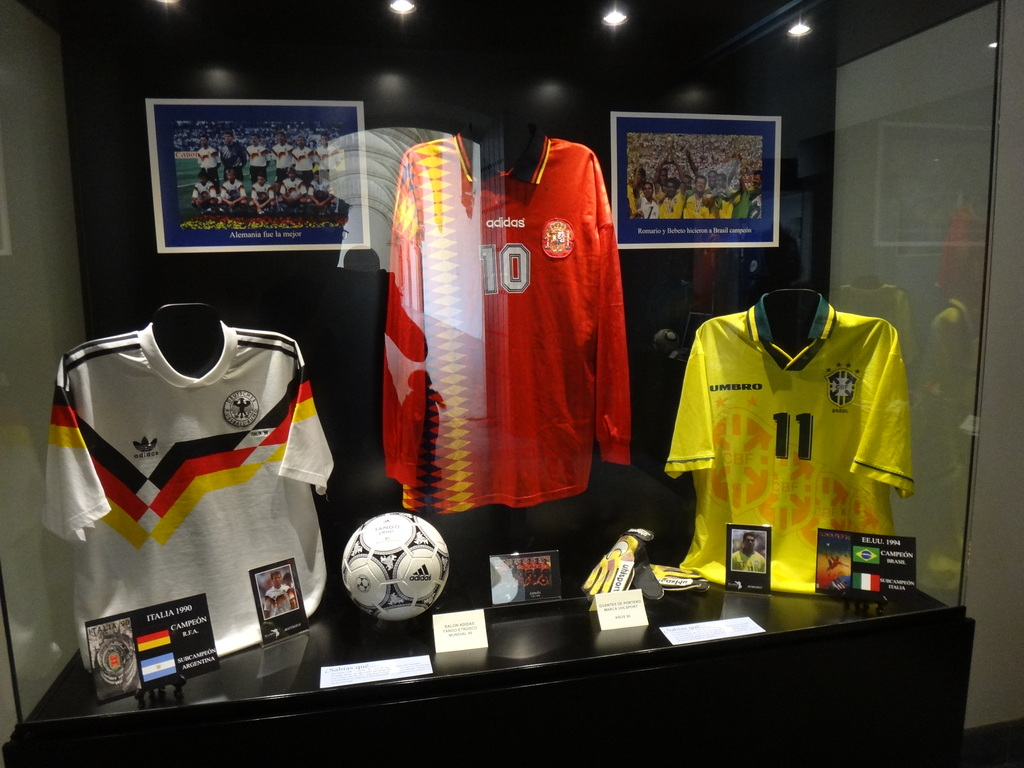
Matthäus's 1990 World Cup-winning shirt on display

His immediate success in Italy's premier football league, the Serie A, was a precursor to the national team which finally managed to triumph at the 1990 FIFA World Cup held in Italy. Six of West Germany's squad played professionally there; Matthäus and the West German squad played most of the World Cup games at Inter's home stadium the San Siro. West Germany was the best team of the tournament and one of the few to choose an attacking style of play, contrary to previous German teams' more defensive style. Matthäus led his squad from midfield and scored four goals, including two in the team's opening group match, a 4–1 win against Yugoslavia. He scored the only goal of the quarter-final against Czechoslovakia from a penalty awarded in the 25th minute of the match. West Germany reached its third consecutive final, a rematch against Maradona-led Argentina, and this time Matthäus and his team emerged victorious 1–0 at the Stadio Olimpico in Rome thanks to Andreas Brehme converting an 85th minute penalty. Matthäus later said that playing the World Cup in Italy was "like playing a World Cup at home". As team captain, Matthäus hoisted the last World Cup trophy before German reunification in 1990.

Matthäus did not participate in UEFA Euro 1992 in Sweden due to an injury, where a reunified Germany made the final but surprisingly lost 2–0 to Denmark. At the 1994 FIFA World Cup in the United States, he captained the team but now operated as sweeper. He scored a penalty in Germany's quarter-final match against Bulgaria at Giants Stadium in New York City, which was also his record-tying 21st World Cup match, but the Bulgarians scored twice in three minutes to upset the defending champions. USA '94 was expected to be his last tournament, though he did not officially retire from international play. Matthäus was afterwards not called up for the national team, due to feuding with succeeding captain Jürgen Klinsmann and coach Berti Vogts. In his absence Germany won UEFA Euro 1996 in England.

Surprisingly, he was called up for the 1998 World Cup in France as a replacement for the injured Matthias Sammer. He was on the bench for Germany's victory over the United States, but came in as a substitute against FR Yugoslavia and helped the team to a 2–2 draw. He became the second player to appear in five different World Cup tournaments, tying the record of Mexican goalkeeper Antonio Carbajal. In 2014, the record has also been tied by Italian goalkeeper Gianluigi Buffon, who however has only played in four. Matthäus played in all the rest of Germany's matches until Croatia knocked them out in Lyon 3–0 in the quarterfinals, taking his total to a then-record 25 (since eclipsed by Lionel Messi).

=== Final international year ===
Matthäus earned his last three caps at UEFA Euro 2000 in Belgium and the Netherlands, with his 150th cap being against Portugal, where Germany had a disastrous first-round exit. He had a poor performance in the first group game against Romania, causing Oliver Bierhoff and other key German players to demand his benching, but head coach Erich Ribbeck stuck by Matthäus.

== Coaching career ==
One year after ending his playing career, Matthäus went into coaching. In his print interviews and other media appearances, he has been open about his goal and desire to coach in the German Bundesliga. His hope was that taking coaching jobs abroad would lead to offers from German clubs.

When none came his way even after multiple foreign appointments, he often brought it up in the German press in-between his coaching stints. In a lengthy November 2009 Frankfurter Allgemeine Zeitung interview, Matthäus complained about what he considers to be inadequate treatment he receives in Germany as a former great. He also bemoaned the lack of coaching job offers extended to him in the German Bundesliga—claiming German clubs perceive him as too much of a Bayern supporter and too closely linked with the influential Bild tabloid newspaper to give him a job.

=== Rapid Wien ===
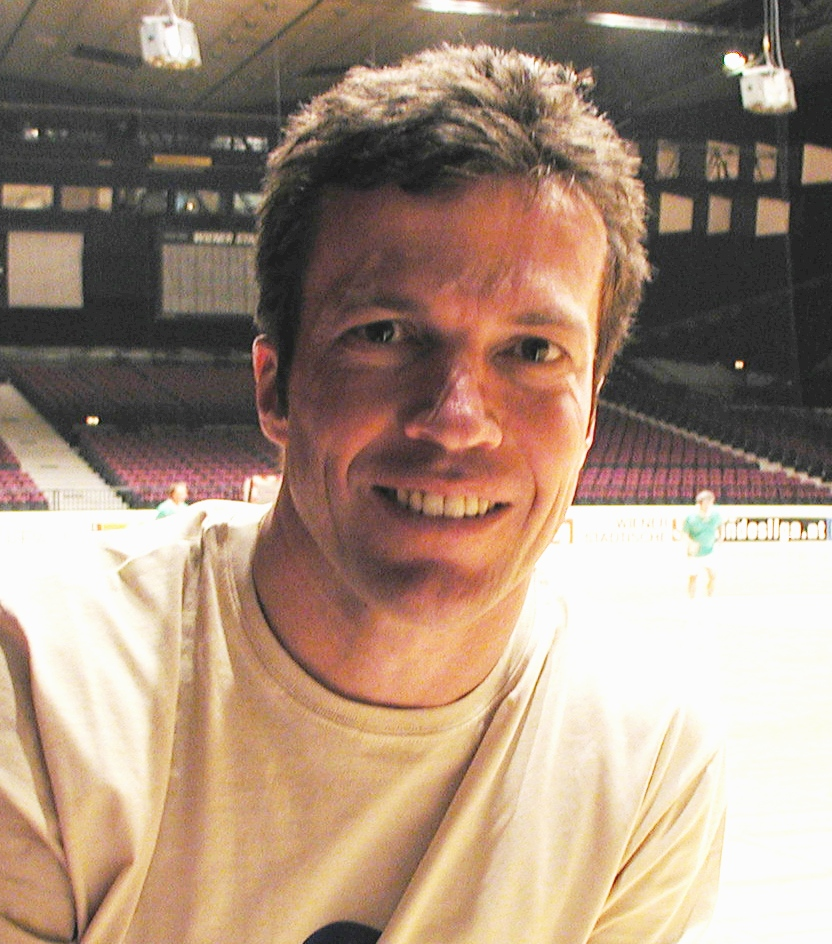
Matthäus in Vienna, January 2002

His first head coaching experience was at SK Rapid Wien in the Austrian Bundesliga, lasting from 6 September 2001 until 14 May 2002 with mixed results. Matthäus got Rapid Wien to the second round of the UEFA Cup, Round of 16 in the Austrian Cup, and finished in eighth place in Bundesliga.

=== Partizan ===
In December 2002, looking to replace their recently sacked head coach Ljubiša Tumbaković, Serbian club FK Partizan hired Matthäus during mid-season winter break, signing the German to an 18-month contract.

Inheriting a team at the top of the league table, Matthäus achieved the immediate goal of steering Partizan to the 2002–03 league title; and did so in convincing fashion, extending the lead over the second-placed cross-town rivals Red Star Belgrade to 19 points at one point.

The German's finest hour with the club, however, came in August 2003 when Partizan eliminated Newcastle United in the Champions League third qualifying round to reach the 2003–04 competition's group stage. Following the first leg 0–1 loss at home, Partizan improbably triumphed 0–1 away at St. James' Park against the third-placed English Premier League club, taking the tie to extra-time and eventually penalties. The penalty series brought further dramatic changes of momentum before right back Milivoje Ćirković's successful spot-kick in the seventh penalty round finally put Partizan through. Matthäus notably had his back turned to the pitch as couldn't bear to watch the drama of Ćirković's penalty. Drawn in a tough group with Real Madrid, eventual champions FC Porto, and Olympique de Marseille, Partizan finished last thus missing out on the UEFA Cup spot.

On 13 December 2003, right after finishing the final league match of the first half of the season before the winter break (0–1 win away at FK Železnik), Matthäus abruptly resigned his Partizan post by addressing the players and club leadership in private. A club spokesperson said Matthäus would clear everything up at a press conference scheduled for two days later, but it was already widely speculated through reports in the Hungarian press that the German had agreed terms with the Hungarian Football Federation to coach the Hungary national team. The rumours proved true as he officially signed the contract in Budapest and also got introduced to the media at Kempinski Hotel Corvinus.

Four months after leaving Belgrade, in mid-April 2004, Matthäus, by now Hungarian national team head coach, gave a detailed interview to Serbian press, accusing Partizan club leadership of breaching the additional terms of his contract. Matthäus revealed on the occasion that his initial contract with Partizan, finalized on 1 January 2003, had included a base guaranteed part in addition to premium clauses entitling him to between 5–10% of newly-agreed shirt sponsorship deals and of transfer fee amounts received by the club from selected players' sales, as well as Champions League bonus incentives. Matthäus further claimed that after none of the additional terms had been honoured, he had given up on asking for his percentages of the Danko Lazović and Zvonimir Vukić summer 2003 transfers out of the club (to Feyenoord and Shakhtar Donetsk, respectively) as well as from Superfund shirt sponsorship deal due to "not wanting to upset the team atmosphere during Champions League qualifying", but instead had pushed for the additional terms to be renegotiated. After successful Champions League qualification in August 2003, the additional terms had in fact been renegotiated with Partizan's general secretary Žarko Zečević so that both parties had thus agreed to put the previous additional terms out of effect and instead now entitle Matthäus to 15% of Igor Duljaj's (club's best young asset at the time) future transfer abroad as well as to allow Matthäus the option of leaving his contract at any point without penalties. Duljaj was sold to Shakhtar Donetsk in January 2004 for US$4 million, and Matthäus claimed Partizan had failed to pay him the agreed percentage of US$600,000 (or €469,500). The club responded two days later in a lengthy press release claiming not to owe him any money. One day after that, Matthäus sued FK Partizan for the amount of US$600,000 before the Sports Arbitration Court in Lausanne, Switzerland.

=== Hungarian national team ===
Matthäus became manager of the Hungary national football team on 14 December 2003. Taking over the national team of a country once synonymous with world class football that had over the decades in the meantime fallen to the point of being unable to qualify for a major competition since the 1986 FIFA World Cup, Matthäus was given the task of qualifying for the 2006 World Cup as part of the Hungarian Football Federation's (MLSZ) ambitious plan of returning on the path of former 1950s glory. After being drawn in a tough group with Sweden, Croatia and Bulgaria that goal looked increasingly difficult.

The campaign started in the autumn of 2004 and fairly quickly it became obvious Hungary were in over their heads. Opening 3–0 loss away at Croatia in early September was somewhat offset four days later by a 3–2 hard fought home win versus Iceland. A month later, Matthäus' Hungary faced another important test away from home, this time at Sweden and once again it finished in disappointment with another demoralizing 3–0 loss. Before the winter break, Hungary managed to beat the minnows of the group Malta thus finishing the autumn part of the qualifying in fourth place with six points, mathematically still within striking distance of the leading trio. Notable was a 2–0 win in a friendly in Kaiserslautern against Germany on 6 June 2004.

As the qualifiers resumed in late March 2005, Hungary hosted Bulgaria in what was pretty much a must win match for Matthäus' squad, however they only managed a draw right at the end with the goal coming in 90th minute for a 1–1 final scoreline. As Croatia and Sweden both won on the same occasion, the leading duo of teams now tangibly separated themselves from the pack of chasers, all of which meant that to qualify, Hungary would have to win all its remaining fixtures and get favourable results elsewhere. Such an improbable scenario failed to materialize and they ended up in fourth place with 14 points from 10 matches, behind Croatia and Sweden who had 25 and 24 points, respectively. However, Matthäus was allowed to finish out the campaign behind the bench, and was even offered Hungarian citizenship, which he at the time said he would accept. There's no word whether he actually did. Matthäus left the Hungarian national team on 11 January 2006.

After leaving the Hungary post, Matthäus was vocally critical of the Hungarian Football Federation (MLSZ), accusing it in November 2007 of "not contributing, but exploiting Hungarian football" before adding that "it is not coincidental that the Hungarian bid to host Euro 2012 didn't receive any votes".

=== Athletico Paranaense ===
Matthäus signed a one-year contract to coach Brazilian club Athletico Paranaense from the city of Curitiba on 11 January 2006. However, after only seven matches in charge (five wins, two draws) from the start of the 2006 Paraná state championship, he quit the club in March 2006 citing the need to be closer to his family. The way he left raised some questions about his professionalism. Apparently, only five weeks after signing a contract he informed club officials about a need to rush back to Europe in order to deal with an urgent personal problem, but assured them he'd be back in 3–4 days. After missing for two weeks, he faxed in his resignation on 20 March and never even went back to Brazil to pick up his personal belongings. Some ten days later, Atlético put out a release mentioning that Matthäus ran up R$13,000 (US$5,915) in phone charges that the club wanted him to pay. The club even posted the bill on their website.

=== Red Bull Salzburg ===
On 19 May 2006, only two months following the bizarre Brazilian episode, Matthäus was announced as coach of Red Bull Salzburg (formerly Austria Salzburg) for the upcoming 2006–07 season. Shortly, the club also signed Giovanni Trapattoni (incidentally Matthäus' former coach at both Inter Milan and Bayern) to be their director of football. In practice, this meant that Trapattoni and Matthäus essentially shared coaching duties.

Despite co-leading the team to the Austrian league title by a large margin, Matthäus would eventually be fired on 12 June 2007 by unanimous decision of the Red Bull Salzburg's board of directors.

=== Maccabi Netanya ===
On 13 April 2008, it was announced that Matthäus signed with Israeli club Maccabi Netanya to coach the team from the beginning of the 2008–09 season.

On 29 April 2009, with the Israeli league season still ongoing and Netanya sitting in fourth place, it was announced that Matthäus would not be back for the second season once the current one was finished. The reason cited was the financial trouble that the club was going through. Matthäus' club finished the league season in fourth spot.

=== Bulgaria national team ===
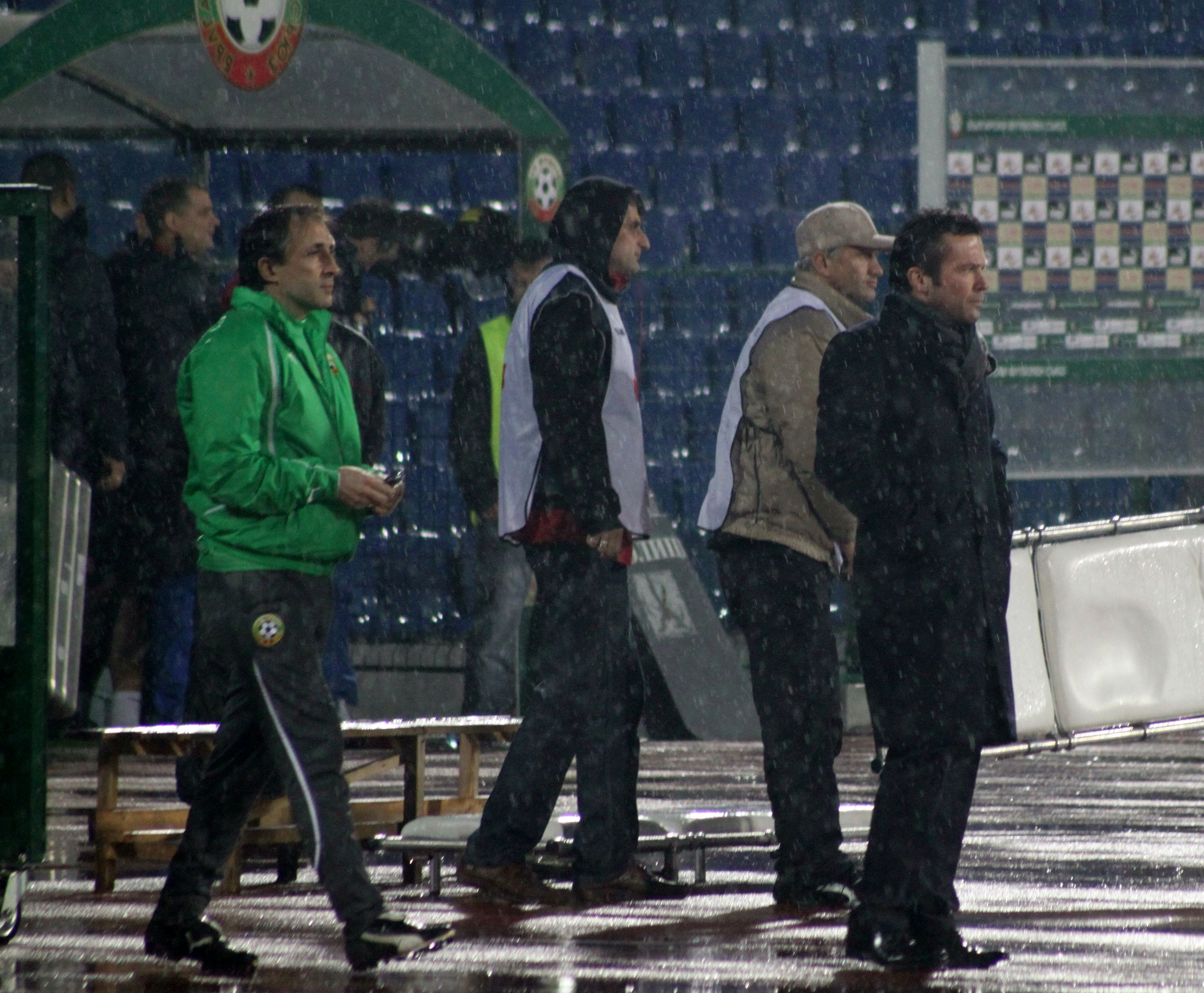
Matthäus (right) during a friendly match against Serbia in November 2010

On 23 September 2010, it was announced that Matthäus would be the new coach of the Bulgarian national team after the resignation of Stanimir Stoilov a few weeks earlier. His contract was for one year with the option for a two-year extension.

He started with a 1–0 win against Wales in Cardiff on his debut. Matthäus led Bulgaria to their first win in 2010 and in the UEFA Euro 2012 qualification campaign. On 12 October 2010, he led Bulgaria to a 2–0 win over Saudi Arabia in a friendly. On 17 November 2010, in a friendly played in Sofia, Bulgaria lost to Serbia 0–1. Despite winning his first match in the qualifiers against Wales, Bulgaria under Matthäus were unable to qualify for Euro 2012, following draws with Switzerland and Montenegro, as well as a home loss against England. On 19 September 2011, it was revealed that Matthäus had been sacked. The match against Switzerland was his final match.

In April 2018, he was one of 77 applicants for the vacant Cameroon national team job.

== Columnist and TV pundit ==
From 2001 until 2009, in parallel and in-between his coaching jobs, Matthäus wrote a column for the German weekly sports magazine Sport Bild.

He also worked as in-studio TV pundit on a variety of television networks during big football competitions: for the German pay television channel Premiere during the 2002 and 2006 FIFA World Cups, for the German channel ZDF during UEFA Euro 2004, for Eurosport during UEFA Euro 2008, for the Arabian network Al Jazeera Sports during the 2010 FIFA World Cup, for the Iranian channel IRIB during the 2014 FIFA World Cup and 2015 AFC Asian Cup, and for the British TV network ITV during UEFA Euro 2016. Since the 2012–13 Bundesliga season, he has worked as an expert for the Pay TV broadcaster Sky Deutschland.

He has further participated in a special É Campeão for the Brazilian channel SporTV.

== Style of play ==
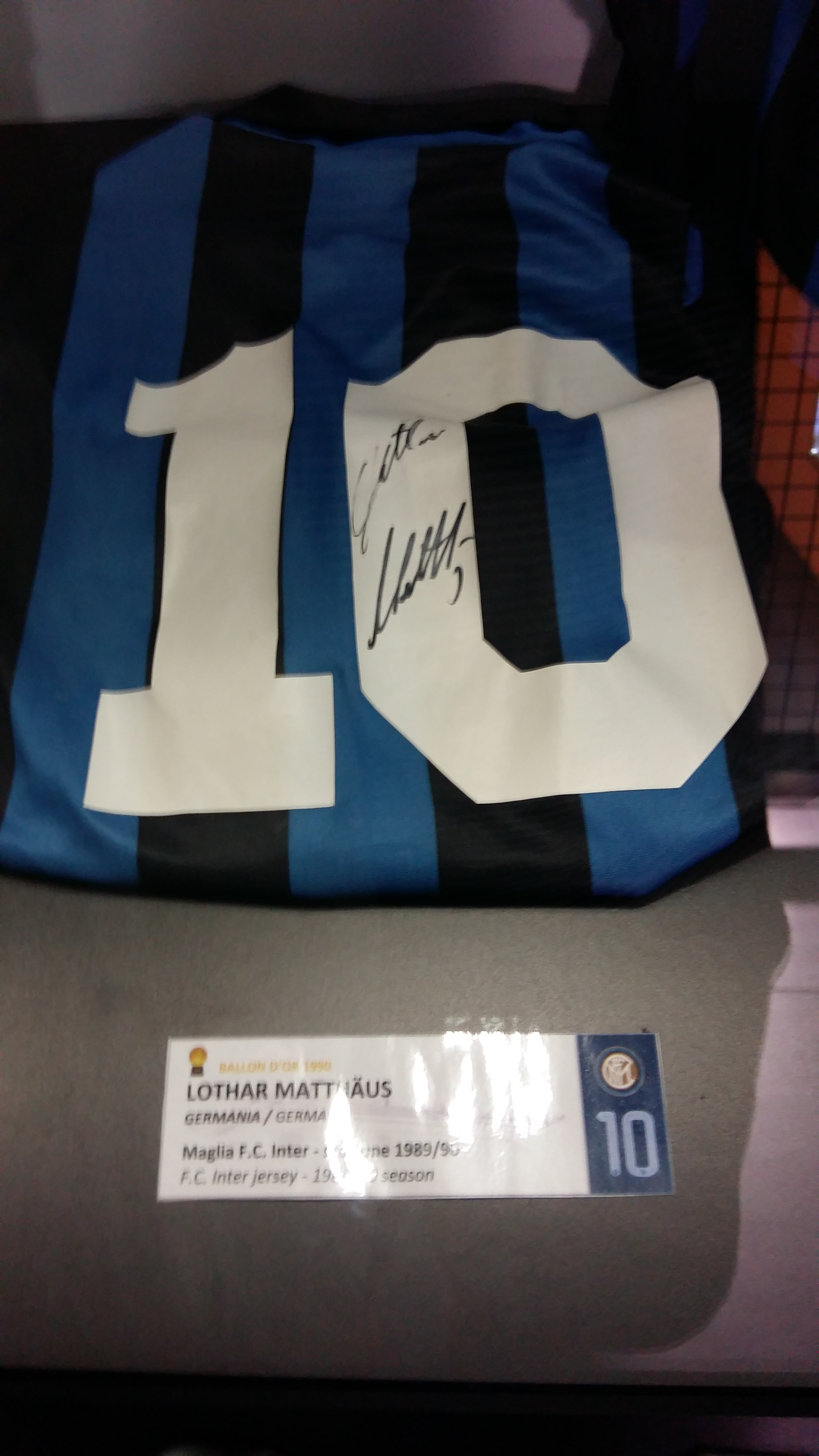
Matthäus's Inter Milan shirt at the San Siro Museum

I admire Platini, I admire Maradona, but to win, I need Matthäus.

— Giovanni Trapattoni, Matthäus' manager at Inter Milan and Bayern Munich.

Matthäus was renowned for his technical ability, positioning, passing, stamina and tackling ability, as well as his long-range shooting ability with both feet. He is considered to be one of the greatest midfielders of all time. Primarily a box-to-box midfielder, he was also capable of playing as an attacking or defensive midfielder.

Journalist Jacques Thibert, writing for France Football, who awarded Matthäus the 1990 Ballon d'Or, described him as a player that despite not being sublime in anything individually, was good in every aspect of the game, which allowed him to be at ease in every area of the pitch. Furthermore, Thibert credited his Inter manager Giovanni Trapattoni for turning him into a more creative, assertive and rhythmic player. At Inter under Trapattoni, Matthäus excelled in a three-man midfield, either in a free role as a deep-lying playmaker, or even as an offensive left-sided central midfielder in the mezzala role on occasion, with either Gianfranco Matteoli or Sergio Battistini serving as defensive midfielder and Nicola Berti as a box-to-box midfielder.

Germany national team manager Berti Vogts eventually decided to play Matthäus, now well into his thirties and hampered by injuries, as a sweeper, a position that he would later play at his final five years with Bayern. As a sweeper, Matthäus enjoyed great freedom, as he could defend and make offensive runs into the opposing team's defensive area, and also exert influence into Bayern's attacking game due to his ability to read the game. Aside from his passing and long range shooting abilities, Matthäus was also an expert free kick and penalty taker, known for his powerful strikes from set pieces. In addition to his footballing skills, Matthäus was also praised for his winning mentality, determination, leadership, and commanding presence on the pitch, which made him a decisive player for his teams.

== Personal life ==
Matthäus has four children, and has been married five times. During his first marriage (1981–1992), he had two daughters with wife Silvia.

In 1994, he married Swiss model and TV presenter Lolita Morena with whom he had a son. The marriage ended in 1999.

While coaching Partizan in Belgrade, Matthäus met 31-year-old Serbian socialite Marijana Čolić who became his third wife on 27 November 2003. By late 2007, the couple separated and she filed for divorce, which became official in late January 2009 following a year-long court case in Salzburg, Austria (their last residence) over the division of assets.

In December 2008, 47-year-old Matthäus married 21-year-old Ukrainian model Kristina Liliana Chudinova. The ceremony was held in Las Vegas. They met a year earlier at the Oktoberfest beer festival in Munich. The couple lived in Tel Aviv, Israel, where Liliana studied journalism in a local university; but started living separately by early 2010.

Matthäus married Anastasia Klimko in 2014 and they have a son. The marriage ended in 2021.

In 2023, Matthäus became a co-owner of the Ghanaian football team Accra Lions.

== Media appearances ==
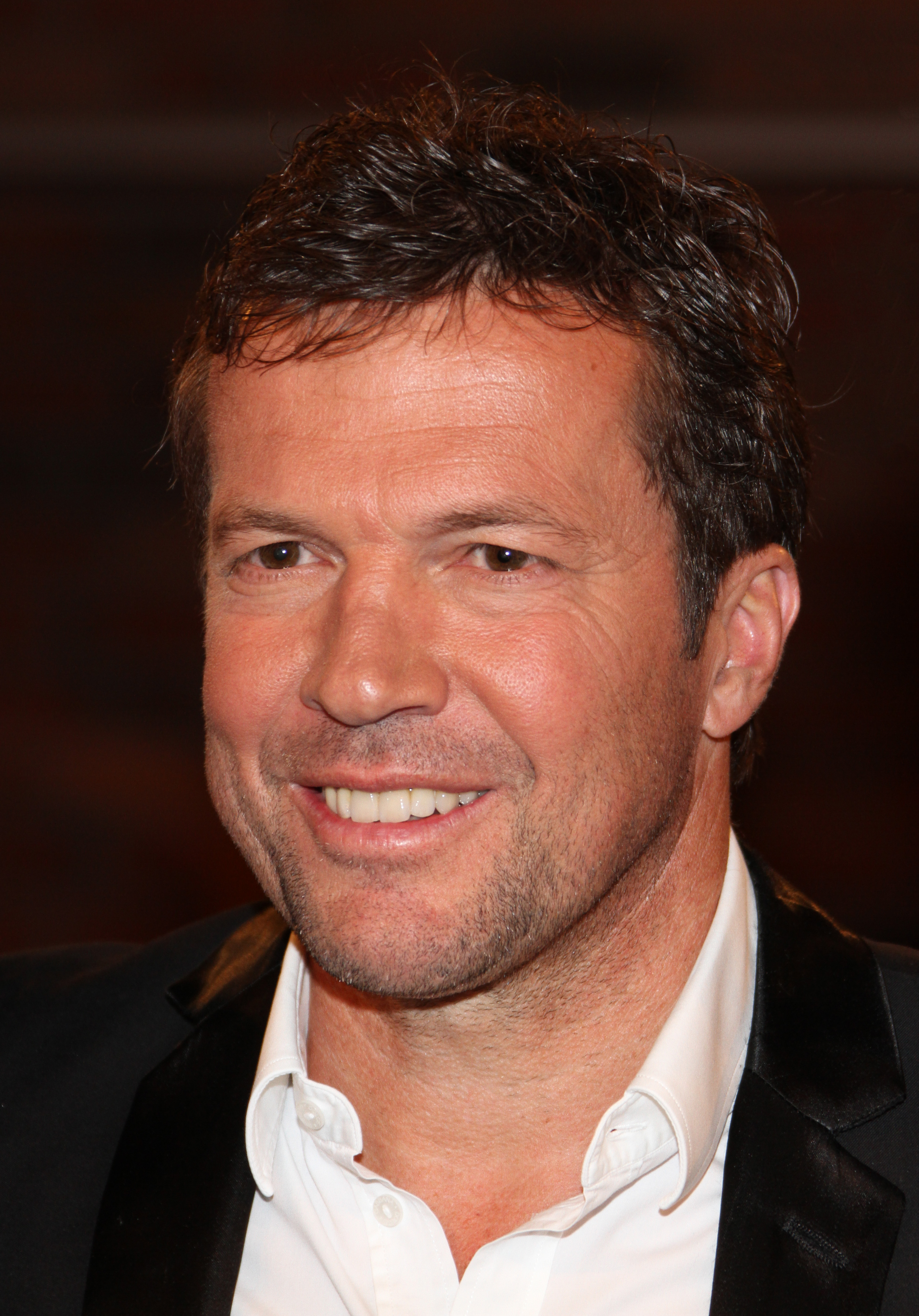
Matthäus in 2012

Matthäus features in EA Sports' FIFA video game series; he was on the cover of the German edition of FIFA 2001, and features in the FIFA 14, FIFA 15, FIFA 16, FIFA 17, FIFA 18, FIFA 19 and FIFA 20 as an Ultimate Team Icon. Matthäus was also prominently featured in the opening video scene of EA's Euro 2000 video game, with Paul Oakenfold transforming the real Matthäus into an interactive digital player he controls in the game with his turntables. In August 2019, Matthäus became the face of turn-based football management game Football, Tactics & Glory; he does not actually appear in the game itself.

Matthäus had a guest role together with Joanna Tuczyńska in the television series Alarm für Cobra 11 – Die Autobahnpolizei, in which he played himself in March 2012. In June 2012, VOX broadcast a documentary titled "Lothar – immer am Ball".

== Career statistics ==
=== Club ===
Appearances and goals by club, season and competition
Club	Season	League			National cup (Note: Includes DFB-Pokal, Coppa Italia, Open Cup)		League cup (Note: Includes DFL-Supercup, DFB Ligapokal, Supercoppa Italiana, MLS Cup)		Continental (Note: Includes European Cup/UEFA Champions League, UEFA Cup Winners' Cup, UEFA Cup)		Total	
Club	Season	Division	Apps	Goals	Apps	Goals	Apps	Goals	Apps	Goals	Apps	Goals
Borussia Mönchengladbach	1979–80	Bundesliga	28	4	2	0	–		11	2	41	6
Borussia Mönchengladbach	1980–81	Bundesliga	33	10	5	2	—		—		38	12
Borussia Mönchengladbach	1981–82	Bundesliga	33	3	5	4	—		4	1	42	8
Borussia Mönchengladbach	1982–83	Bundesliga	34	8	5	2	—		—		39	10
Borussia Mönchengladbach	1983–84	Bundesliga	34	11	6	4	—		—		40	15
Borussia Mönchengladbach	Total		162	36	23	12	—		15	3	200	51
Bayern Munich	1984–85	Bundesliga	33	16	6	0	—		5	1	44	17
Bayern Munich	1985–86	Bundesliga	23	10	5	2	—		3	0	31	12
Bayern Munich	1986–87	Bundesliga	31	14	3	1	—		7	4	41	19
Bayern Munich	1987–88	Bundesliga	26	17	4	3	—		4	1	34	21
Bayern Munich	Total		113	57	18	6	—		19	6	150	69
Inter Milan	1988–89	Serie A	32	9	7	3	—		5	0	44	12
Inter Milan	1989–90	Serie A	25	11	2	2	0	0	2	0	29	13
Inter Milan	1990–91	Serie A	31	16	3	1	—		12	6	46	23
Inter Milan	1991–92	Serie A	27	4	5	1	—		2	0	34	5
Inter Milan	Total		115	40	17	7	0	0	21	6	153	53
Bayern Munich	1992–93	Bundesliga	28	8	0	0	—		—		28	8
Bayern Munich	1993–94	Bundesliga	33	8	3	1	—		4	1	40	10
Bayern Munich	1994–95	Bundesliga	16	5	2	0	—		6	0	24	5
Bayern Munich	1995–96	Bundesliga	19	1	0	0	—		7	0	26	1
Bayern Munich	1996–97	Bundesliga	28	1	3	0	—		2	0	33	1
Bayern Munich	1997–98	Bundesliga	25	3	3	0	2	0	5	0	35	3
Bayern Munich	1998–99	Bundesliga	25	1	5	0	2	0	12	1	44	2
Bayern Munich	1999–2000	Bundesliga	15	1	2	0	0	0	9	0	26	1
Bayern Munich	Total		189	28	18	1	4	0	45	2	256	31
MetroStars	2000	Major League Soccer	16	0	2	0	5	0	—		23	0
Career total			595	161	78	26	9	0	100	17	782	204

=== International ===
Appearances and goals by national team and year
National team	Year	Apps	Goals
Germany	1980	1	0
Germany	1981	1	0
Germany	1982	10	0
Germany	1983	7	0
Germany	1984	10	0
Germany	1985	7	1
Germany	1986	15	2
Germany	1987	6	1
Germany	1988	10	4
Germany	1989	3	1
Germany	1990	15	7
Germany	1991	7	3
Germany	1992	4	0
Germany	1993	11	0
Germany	1994	15	3
Germany	1995	0	0
Germany	1996	0	0
Germany	1997	0	0
Germany	1998	8	0
Germany	1999	13	1
Germany	2000	7	0
Total		150	23

Scores and results list West Germany's and Germany's goal tally first, score column indicates score after each Matthäus goal

List of international goals scored by Lothar Matthäus
No.	Date	Venue	Opponent	Score	Result	Competition
1	30 April 1985	Stadion Evžena Rošického, Prague, Czech Republic	Czechoslovakia	3–0	5–1	1986 FIFA World Cup qualification
2	5 February 1986	Stadio Partenio-Adriano Lombardi, Avellino, Italy	Italy	2–1	2–1	Friendly
3	17 June 1986	Estadio Universitario, Monterrey, Mexico	Morocco	1–0	1–0	1986 FIFA World Cup
4	25 March 1987	Ramat Gan Stadium, Ramat Gan, Israel	Israel	2–0	2–0	Friendly
5	2 April 1988	Olympiastadion, West Berlin, West Germany	Argentina	1–0	1–0	Four Nations Tournament (1988)
6	4 June 1988	Weserstadion, Bremen, West Germany	Yugoslavia	1–1	1–1	Friendly
7	21 June 1988	Volksparkstadion, Hamburg, West Germany	Netherlands	1–0	1–2	UEFA Euro 1988
8	31 August 1988	Helsinki Olympic Stadium, Helsinki, Finland	Finland	3–0	4–0	1990 FIFA World Cup qualification
9	4 October 1989	Westfalenstadion, Dortmund, West Germany	Finland	6–1	6–1	1990 FIFA World Cup qualification
10	25 April 1990	Neckarstadion, Stuttgart, West Germany	Uruguay	1–1	3–3	Friendly
11	10 June 1990	San Siro, Milan, Italy	Yugoslavia	1–0	4–1	1990 FIFA World Cup
12	10 June 1990	San Siro, Milan, Italy	Yugoslavia	3–1	4–1	1990 FIFA World Cup
13	15 June 1990	San Siro, Milan, Italy	United Arab Emirates	3–1	5–1	1990 FIFA World Cup
14	1 July 1990	San Siro, Milan, Italy	Czechoslovakia	1–0	1–0	1990 FIFA World Cup
15	29 August 1990	Estádio da Luz (1954), Lisbon, Portugal	Portugal	1–0	1–1	Friendly
16	19 December 1990	Neckarstadion, Stuttgart, Germany	Switzerland	4–0	4–0	Friendly
17	27 March 1991	Waldstadion (Frankfurt), Frankfurt, Germany	Soviet Union	2–0	2–1	Friendly
18	1 May 1991	Niedersachsenstadion, Hanover, Germany	Belgium	1–0	1–0	UEFA Euro 1992 qualifying
19	18 December 1991	Ulrich Haberland Stadion, Leverkusen, Germany	Luxembourg	1–0	4–0	UEFA Euro 1992 qualifying
20	10 July 1994	Giants Stadium, East Rutherford, United States	Bulgaria	1–0	1–2	1994 FIFA World Cup
21	14 December 1994	Stadionul Republican, Chişinău, Moldova	Moldova	3–0	3–0	UEFA Euro 1996 qualifying
22	18 December 1994	Fritz-Walter-Stadion, Kaiserslautern, Germany	Albania	2–0	2–1	UEFA Euro 1996 qualifying
23	28 July 1999	Estadio Jalisco, Guadalajara, Mexico	New Zealand	2–0	2–0	1999 FIFA Confederations Cup

== Managerial statistics ==
As of 19 September 2011

Team	From	To	Record					Ref.
Team	From	To	M	W	D	L	Win %	Ref.
Rapid Wien	6 September 2001	14 May 2002	32	9	9	14	28.13	
Partizan	22 December 2002	14 December 2003	44	29	6	9	65.91	
Hungary	14 December 2003	11 January 2006	28	11	3	14	39.29	
Atlético Paranaense	11 January 2006	20 March 2006	8	6	2	0	75.00	
Maccabi Netanya	13 June 2008	29 April 2009	32	14	12	6	43.75	
Bulgaria	23 September 2010	19 September 2011	10	3	3	4	30.00	
Total			154	72	35	47	46.75	

== Honours ==
=== Player ===
Borussia Mönchengladbach

- UEFA Cup runner-up: 1979–80
- DFB-Pokal runner-up: 1983–84

Bayern Munich

- Bundesliga: 1984–85, 1985–86, 1986–87, 1993–94, 1996–97, 1998–99
- DFB-Pokal: 1985–86, 1997–98
- DFB-Ligapokal: 1997, 1998, 1999
- DFB-Supercup: 1987
- UEFA Cup: 1995–96
- UEFA Champions League runner-up: 1986–87, 1998–99

Inter Milan

- Serie A: 1988–89
- Supercoppa Italiana: 1989
- UEFA Cup: 1990–91

MetroStars

- MLS Eastern Division Champion: 2000

Germany

- FIFA World Cup: 1990
- UEFA European Championship: 1980
- U.S. Cup: 1993

Individual

- Ballon d'Or: 1990
- IFFHS World's Best Player: 1990
- World Soccer Awards Player of the Year: 1990
- FIFA World Player of the Year: 1991
- FIFA World Cup Silver Ball: 1990
- FIFA World Cup All-Star Team: 1990
- UEFA European Championship Team of the Tournament: 1988
- Onze d'Or: 1990
- Onze de bronze: 1991
- Onze de Onze: 1988, 1989, 1990, 1991
- Footballer of the Year (Germany): 1990, 1999
- Goal of the Year (Germany): 1990, 1992
- VDV Bundesliga Player of the Year: 1999
- kicker Bundesliga Team of the Season: 1982–83, 1984–85, 1987–88, 1992–93, 1993–94
- Pirata d'Oro (Inter Milan Player of the Year): 1991
- MLS All-Star: 2000
- World XI: 1996, 1997, 2001
- FIFA 100
- Golden Foot legends award: 2012
- IFFHS Legends
- Germany's Sports Hall of Fame inductee: 2017
- Bayern Munich Hall of Fame
- Inter Milan Hall of Fame: 2018
- Ballon d'Or Dream Team: 2020
- IFFHS All-time Men's B Dream Team: 2021
- IFFHS World Team of the Century: 1901-2000
- IFFHS European Team of the Century: 1901-2000

=== Manager ===
Partizan

- Serbian SuperLiga: 2002–03

== See also ==
- List of men's footballers with 100 or more international caps
- List of FIFA World Cup top goalscorers
- FIFA World Cup awards
- List of foreign Serie A players

Sporting positions
Preceded by Klaus Allofs	Germany captain 1987–1992	Succeeded by Andreas Brehme
Preceded by Andreas Brehme	Germany captain 1992–1995	Succeeded by Jürgen Klinsmann
Preceded by Raimond Aumann	Bayern Munich captain 1994–1997	Succeeded by Thomas Helmer
