= 1984–85 Bundesliga =

22nd season of the Bundesliga

Bundesliga
- Season: 1984–85
- Dates: 24 August 1984 – 8 June 1985
- Champions: Bayern Munich; 7th Bundesliga title 8th German title
- Relegated: Arminia Bielefeld; Karlsruher SC; Eintracht Braunschweig
- European Cup: FC Bayern Munich
- Cup Winners' Cup: Bayer 05 Uerdingen
- UEFA Cup: SV Werder Bremen; 1. FC Köln; Borussia Mönchengladbach; Hamburger SV
- Matches: 306
- Goals: 1,052 (3.44 per match)
- Average goals/game: 3.44
- Top goalscorer: Klaus Allofs (26)
- Biggest home win: M'gladbach 10–0 Br'schweig (11 October 1984)
- Biggest away win: Bielefeld 2–7 Stuttgart (8 September 1984)
- Highest scoring: M'gladbach 10–0 Br'schweig (10 goals) (11 October 1984)

The 1984–85 Bundesliga was the 22nd season of the Bundesliga, the premier football league in West Germany. It began on 24 August 1984 and ended on 8 June 1985. VfB Stuttgart were the defending champions.

== Competition modus ==
Every team played two games against each other team, one at home and one away. Teams received two points for a win and one point for a draw. If two or more teams were tied on points, places were determined by goal difference and, if still tied, by goals scored. The team with the most points were crowned champions while the two teams with the fewest points were relegated to 2. Bundesliga. The third-to-last team had to compete in a two-legged relegation/promotion play-off against the third-placed team from 2. Bundesliga.

== Team changes to 1983–84 ==
Kickers Offenbach and 1. FC Nürnberg were directly relegated to the 2. Bundesliga after finishing in the last two places. They were replaced by Karlsruher SC and FC Schalke 04. Relegation/promotion play-off participant Eintracht Frankfurt won on aggregate against MSV Duisburg and thus retained their Bundesliga status.

== Team overview ==
Location of teams in Bundesliga 1984–85

Club	Location	Ground	Capacity
Arminia Bielefeld	Bielefeld	Stadion Alm	35,000
VfL Bochum	Bochum	Ruhrstadion	40,000
Eintracht Braunschweig	Braunschweig	Stadion an der Hamburger Straße	38,000
SV Werder Bremen	Bremen	Weserstadion	32,000
Borussia Dortmund	Dortmund	Westfalenstadion	54,000
Fortuna Düsseldorf	Düsseldorf	Rheinstadion	59,600
Eintracht Frankfurt	Frankfurt am Main	Waldstadion	62,000
Hamburger SV	Hamburg	Volksparkstadion	80,000
1. FC Kaiserslautern	Kaiserslautern	Stadion Betzenberg	42,000
Karlsruher SC	Karlsruhe	Wildparkstadion	50,000
1. FC Köln	Cologne	Müngersdorfer Stadion	61,000
Bayer 04 Leverkusen	Leverkusen	Ulrich-Haberland-Stadion	20,000
SV Waldhof Mannheim	Ludwigshafen am Rhein	Südweststadion	75,000
Borussia Mönchengladbach	Mönchengladbach	Bökelbergstadion	34,500
FC Bayern Munich	Munich	Olympiastadion	80,000
FC Schalke 04	Gelsenkirchen	Parkstadion	70,000
VfB Stuttgart	Stuttgart	Neckarstadion	72,000
Bayer 05 Uerdingen	Krefeld	Grotenburg-Kampfbahn	28,000

- ^1 Waldhof Mannheim played their matches in nearby Ludwigshafen because their own ground did not fulfil Bundesliga requirements.

== League table ==
Pos	Team	Pld	W	D	L	GF	GA	GD	Pts	Qualification or relegation
1	Bayern Munich (C)	34	21	8	5	79	38	+41	50	Qualification to European Cup first round
2	Werder Bremen	34	18	10	6	87	51	+36	46	Qualification to UEFA Cup first round
3	1. FC Köln	34	18	4	12	69	66	+3	40	Qualification to UEFA Cup first round
4	Borussia Mönchengladbach	34	15	9	10	77	53	+24	39	Qualification to UEFA Cup first round
5	Hamburger SV	34	14	9	11	58	49	+9	37	Qualification to UEFA Cup first round
6	Waldhof Mannheim	34	13	11	10	47	50	−3	37	
7	Bayer 05 Uerdingen	34	14	8	12	57	52	+5	36	Qualification to Cup Winners' Cup first round
8	Schalke 04	34	13	8	13	63	62	+1	34	
9	VfL Bochum	34	12	10	12	52	54	−2	34	
10	VfB Stuttgart	34	14	5	15	79	59	+20	33	
11	1. FC Kaiserslautern	34	11	11	12	56	60	−4	33	
12	Eintracht Frankfurt	34	10	12	12	62	67	−5	32	
13	Bayer Leverkusen	34	9	13	12	52	54	−2	31	
14	Borussia Dortmund	34	13	4	17	51	65	−14	30	
15	Fortuna Düsseldorf	34	10	9	15	53	66	−13	29	
16	Arminia Bielefeld (R)	34	8	13	13	46	61	−15	29	Qualification to relegation play-offs
17	Karlsruher SC (R)	34	5	12	17	47	88	−41	22	Relegation to 2. Bundesliga
18	Eintracht Braunschweig (R)	34	9	2	23	39	79	−40	20	Relegation to 2. Bundesliga

Source: www.dfb.de
Rules for classification: 1) points; 2) goal difference; 3) number of goals scored.
(C) Champions; (R) Relegated

== Results ==
Home \ Away	DSC	BOC	EBS	SVW	BVB	F95	SGE	HSV	FCK	KSC	KOE	B04	WMA	BMG	FCB	S04	VFB	B05
Arminia Bielefeld	—	2–3	3–2	3–4	3–0	1–1	2–2	4–1	1–1	4–1	1–0	1–1	0–1	3–3	1–3	2–1	2–7	1–0
VfL Bochum	1–1	—	1–0	1–3	4–1	1–0	3–3	0–0	3–0	5–2	1–3	0–0	0–1	0–2	1–1	0–1	2–1	1–0
Eintracht Braunschweig	0–0	1–3	—	0–2	2–4	1–0	5–0	3–1	2–1	3–1	1–3	0–2	0–1	0–4	0–1	4–2	3–1	0–0
Werder Bremen	2–1	2–2	4–1	—	6–0	2–1	3–3	5–2	6–1	7–1	6–2	2–2	1–1	2–0	4–2	2–1	3–1	1–0
Borussia Dortmund	1–3	3–0	3–1	2–0	—	1–2	2–1	1–2	0–3	0–2	2–0	2–1	0–0	2–3	1–1	4–1	4–1	4–0
Fortuna Düsseldorf	1–1	0–2	4–1	3–2	0–0	—	3–1	4–2	1–0	2–2	1–2	3–2	1–1	2–1	0–2	1–2	2–2	2–2
Eintracht Frankfurt	3–0	1–1	2–0	1–3	2–1	2–2	—	1–0	1–1	4–2	1–4	2–0	7–2	1–1	2–2	1–1	2–0	3–2
Hamburger SV	4–0	3–1	5–0	2–0	4–2	1–2	2–0	—	3–2	0–0	3–1	1–1	5–2	1–1	2–1	2–0	3–1	1–1
1. FC Kaiserslautern	1–1	5–2	1–0	2–2	5–0	3–1	2–1	1–1	—	3–1	6–0	3–3	1–1	2–0	0–1	2–2	2–1	6–1
Karlsruher SC	4–0	1–1	4–1	1–1	2–4	2–2	2–2	1–1	0–0	—	1–4	0–0	3–2	0–1	0–4	2–2	1–1	0–4
1. FC Köln	1–1	2–1	1–0	3–2	6–1	4–2	2–0	2–1	2–0	3–4	—	3–1	0–0	1–5	0–2	4–1	1–1	1–5
Bayer Leverkusen	1–1	1–1	0–3	0–0	0–1	4–3	3–1	2–0	3–0	4–1	4–4	—	2–1	3–2	3–0	2–2	0–2	0–0
Waldhof Mannheim	0–0	2–0	2–0	1–1	1–2	2–1	3–1	3–1	1–1	3–0	1–2	2–1	—	1–3	0–0	5–2	1–1	2–1
Borussia Mönchengladbach	2–0	4–3	10–0	1–1	1–1	0–2	3–3	0–1	7–0	3–3	2–3	1–1	3–0	—	3–2	3–1	2–1	0–0
Bayern Munich	3–3	2–2	3–0	4–2	1–0	6–0	4–2	1–1	3–0	6–2	2–0	2–1	1–2	4–0	—	3–0	3–2	2–1
Schalke 04	3–0	2–3	3–2	2–2	3–1	1–0	1–3	3–0	1–1	3–1	2–3	4–2	4–0	4–1	1–1	—	4–3	2–0
VfB Stuttgart	2–0	1–2	6–1	1–3	2–0	5–2	4–2	1–1	5–0	5–0	3–1	4–1	3–0	2–3	1–3	1–0	—	5–2
Bayer Uerdingen	1–0	3–1	1–2	3–1	2–1	5–2	1–1	2–1	3–0	3–0	2–1	2–1	2–2	3–2	1–3	1–1	3–2	—

Source: DFB
Legend: Blue = home team win; Yellow = draw; Red = away team win.

== Relegation play-offs ==
Arminia Bielefeld and third-placed 2. Bundesliga team 1. FC Saarbrücken had to compete in a two-legged relegation/promotion play-off. Saarbrücken won 3–1 on aggregate and thus were promoted to the Bundesliga.

13 June 1985

1. FC Saarbrücken	2–0	Arminia Bielefeld
Blättel 9'; Dickert 69'	Report link (in German)

Ludwigspark, Saarbrücken
Attendance: 15,000
Referee: Siegfried Brehm (Kemmern)

17 June 1985

Arminia Bielefeld	1–1	1. FC Saarbrücken
Westerwinter 59'	Report link (in German)	Jusufi 78'

Stadion Alm, Bielefeld
Attendance: 32,000
Referee: Peter Gabor (Berlin)

== Top goalscorers ==
26 goals

- (Germany) Klaus Allofs (1. FC Köln)

25 goals

- (Germany) Rudi Völler (SV Werder Bremen)

19 goals

- (Germany) Karl Allgöwer (VfB Stuttgart)
- (Germany) Thomas Allofs (1. FC Kaiserslautern)

18 goals

- (Germany) Siegfried Reich (Arminia Bielefeld)
- (Germany) Klaus Täuber (FC Schalke 04)

17 goals

- (Germany) Günter Thiele (Fortuna Düsseldorf)

16 goals

- (Germany) Klaus Fischer (VfL Bochum)
- (Germany) Pierre Littbarski (1. FC Köln)
- (Germany) Lothar Matthäus (FC Bayern Munich)
- (Germany) Frank Mill (Borussia Mönchengladbach)

== Champion squad ==
FC Bayern Munich
Goalkeepers: Raimond Aumann (20); Jean-Marie Pfaff (Belgium) (14).

Defenders: Norbert Eder (34 / 2); Klaus Augenthaler (32 / 5); Holger Willmer (29 / 3); Hans Pflügler (17 / 2); Bertram Beierlorzer (12); Bernd Martin (8).
Midfielders: Lothar Matthäus (33 / 16); Wolfgang Dremmler (29 / 1); Søren Lerby (Denmark) (28 / 11); Norbert Nachtweih (East Germany) (25 / 3); Bernd Dürnberger (20 / 2); Wolfgang Grobe (3 / 1).
Forwards: Roland Wohlfarth (32 / 12); Ludwig Kögl (27 / 1); Reinhold Mathy (24 / 7); Michael Rummenigge (24 / 5); Dieter Hoeneß (20 / 7).
(league appearances and goals listed in brackets)

Manager: Udo Lattek.

On the roster but have not played in a league game: Manfred Schwabl; Ugur Tütüneker; Karl Del'Haye; Achim Förster; Hans-Werner Grünwald.

== See also ==
- 1984–85 2. Bundesliga
- 1984–85 DFB-Pokal
