= Holger Willmer =

German former footballer (born 1958)

Personal information
- Date of birth: 25 September 1958 (age 68)
- Place of birth: Lübeck, West Germany
- Positions: Defender; midfielder

Team information
- Current team: 1. FC Dornbreite Lübeck (Manager)

Youth career
- VfB Lübeck

Senior career*
Years	Team	Apps	(Gls)
1977–1984	1. FC Köln	165	(14)
1984–1987	FC Bayern Munich	58	(5)
1987–1989	Hannover 96	44	(2)
Total		267	(21)

International career
1979–1982	West Germany B	6	(0)

Managerial career
- 2006–: 1. FC Dornbreite Lübeck
- * Club domestic league appearances and goals

Holger Willmer (born 25 September 1958 in Lübeck) is a German former footballer who played as a defender or midfielder. During his career he played for 1. FC Köln, Bayern Munich and Hannover 96, and won four German titles.

== Career ==
Willmer began his career with 1. FC Köln, and scored within two minutes of his Bundesliga debut for the club, a 5–1 defeat on the opening day of the 1977–78 season. Despite this inauspicious start, Köln went on to be German champions that year, with Willmer adding a further ten appearances. They also won the DFB-Pokal, but Willmer did not play in the final. By the 1979–80 season, Willmer had established himself in Köln's first squad, and helped them to another DFB-Pokal final, this time a 2–1 defeat against Fortuna Düsseldorf in which he appeared as a substitute for Pierre Littbarski.

In 1981–82, Willmer made 33 appearances as Köln finished second in the Bundesliga, and they followed this next year with another cup win - Willmer came on as a late substitute for Harald Konopka as they beat city rivals Fortuna Köln 1–0 in the final. He spent one further season with Köln before joining Bayern Munich in 1984.

Bayern won the league title in the Willmer's first-season, and almost won the double, losing 2–1 against Bayer Uerdingen in the cup final, a match for which Willmer was in the starting line-up. The following year Bayern won another title, leap-frogging Werder Bremen on the last day of the season with a 6–0 win over Borussia Mönchengladbach. Willmer sat this match out, but featured in a second consecutive cup final - replacing Michael Rummenigge late in the game as Bayern did complete the double this time, beating VfB Stuttgart 5–1.

The following season, Willmer was less involved in the first team, making nine appearances as Bayern won a third consecutive German title. Bayern also reached the European Cup Final, and Willmer was an unused substitute for the 2–1 defeat against FC Porto. He left the club at the end of the season, joining Hannover 96, for whom he made 46 appearances over the next two seasons, retiring in 1989 after they had been relegated from the Bundesliga.

== Honours ==
1. FC Köln

- Bundesliga: 1977–78
- DFB-Pokal: 1977–78, 1982–83

Bayern Munich

- Bundesliga: 1984–85, 1985–86, 1986–87
- DFB-Pokal: runner-up 1984–85
