= Bertram Beierlorzer =

German footballer and manager

Personal information
- Date of birth: 31 May 1957 (age 69)
- Place of birth: Neunkirchen am Brand, West Germany
- Height: 1.82 m (6 ft 0 in)
- Position: Defender

Youth career
- TSV Neunkirchen am Brand

Senior career*
Years	Team	Apps	(Gls)
1977–1981	1. FC Nürnberg	119	(6)
1981–1986	Bayern Munich	73	(0)
1986–1988	VfB Stuttgart	31	(0)
Total		223	(6)

International career
1980	West Germany B	1	(0)
1983	West Germany U-21	2	(0)

Managerial career
- 1991: TSV Vestenbergsgreuth (caretaker)
- 1995–1996: SpVgg Fürth
- * Club domestic league appearances and goals

Bertram Beierlorzer (born 31 May 1957 in Neunkirchen am Brand) is a German football coach and former player. As a player, he spent nine seasons in the Bundesliga with 1. FC Nürnberg, FC Bayern Munich and VfB Stuttgart. While at Bayern he won two league titles and three Cups, but an injury suffered in the 1982 DFB Cup Final caused him to miss Bayern's defeat in that year's European Cup final.

He is the older brother of Achim Beierlorzer.

== Honours ==
- Bundesliga: 1984–85, 1985–86
- DFB-Pokal: 1981–82, 1983–84, 1985–86
- DFB-Pokal runner-up: 1984–85
