= 1969–70 Hertha BSC season =

Hertha BSC
1969–70 season
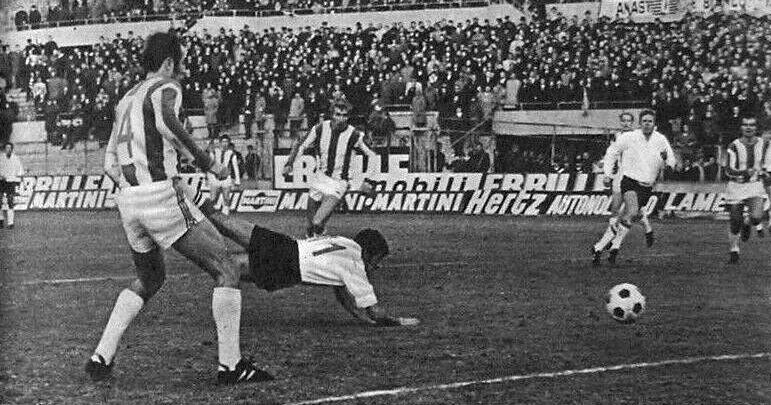
- Hertha playing against Juventus in the 1969–70 Inter-Cities Fairs Cup
- Owner: Gerhard Bautz
- Manager: Fiffi Kronsbein
- Stadium: Olympiastadion
- Bundesliga: 3rd place
- DFB-Pokal: Quarter-finals
- Inter-Cities Fairs Cup: Quarter-finals
- Top goalscorer: League: Franz Brungs (15); All: Lorenz Horr & Franz Brungs (16)
- Highest home attendance: 88,075 (vs. 1. FC Köln)
- Lowest home attendance: 8,000 (vs. VfB Stuttgart)
- Average home league attendance: 42,416
Home colours

The 1969–70 Hertha BSC season was the club's 97th year of existence and season and the 3rd season in the top-flight of German football. The season began on 16 August 1969 against MSV Duisburg and finished on 3 May 1970 against SV Werder Bremen.

== Summary ==
In the 1969–70 season, Hertha BSC, coached by Fiffi Kronsbein, finished the Bundesliga in 3rd place. In the DFB-Pokal, Hertha BSCwas eliminated in the quarter-finals by Alemannia Aachen. In the Inter-Cities Fairs Cup, Hertha Berlin was eliminated in the quarter-finals by Inter Milan.

== Squad ==
No.	Pos.	Nation	Player
—	GK	GER	Volkmar Groß
—	GK	AUT	Gernot Fraydl
—	DF	GER	Hans Eder
—	DF	GER	Peter Enders
—	DF	GER	Karl-Heinz Ferschl
—	DF	GER	Lothar Groß
—	DF	GER	Frank Hanisch
—	DF	GER	Jürgen Lahn
—	DF	GER	Bernd Patzke
—	DF	GER	Uwe Witt
—	MF	GER	Hans-Joachim Altendorff
—	MF	GER	Hermann Bredenfeld
—	MF	GER	Manfred Eichberg

No.	Pos.	Nation	Player
—	MF	GER	Norbert Janzon
—	MF	GER	Detlef Schulz
—	MF	GER	Wolfgang Sidka
—	MF	HUN	Zoltán Varga
—	MF	GER	Tasso Wild
—	MF	GER	Bernd Laube
—	FW	GER	Franz Brungs
—	FW	GER	Werner Ipta
—	FW	GER	Wolfgang Gayer
—	FW	GER	Lorenz Horr
—	FW	GER	Karl-Heinz Leufgen
—	FW	GER	Arno Steffenhagen
—	FW	GER	Jürgen Weber

== Technical staff ==
- Coach: Fiffi Kronsbein
- Assistant Coach: Hans Eder
- Goalkeeping coach:
- Athletic trainers:

== Transfers ==
Transfers In
Date	Name	From	Transfer Fee
Summer 1969	(Germany) Manfred Eichberg	(Germany) Arminia Gütersloh	
Summer 1969	(Germany) Wolfgang Gayer	(Germany) Wiener SC	
Summer 1969	(Germany) Lorenz Horr	(Germany) SV Alsenborn	
Summer 1969	(Germany) Norbert Janzon	(Germany) Hertha BSC II	
Summer 1969	(Germany) Bernd Laube	(Germany) Hertha BSC II	
Summer 1969	(Germany) Bernd Patzke	(Germany) TSV Munich 1860	
Summer 1969	(Germany) Zoltán Varga	(Germany) Standard Liège	
		Total Transfer Fees	

Transfer Out
Date	Name	To	Transfer Fee
Summer 1969	(Germany) Reinhold Adelmann	(Germany) Blau-Weiß Berlin	
Summer 1969	(Germany) Karl-Heinz Hausmann	(Germany) Blau-Weiß Berlin	
Summer 1969	(Germany) Dieter Krafczyk	(Germany) 1. FC Kaiserslautern	
Summer 1969	(Germany) Rudolf Kröner	(Germany) Stuttgarter Kickers	
Summer 1969	(Germany) Hans-Jürgen Krumnow	(Germany) Blau-Weiß Berlin	
Summer 1969	(Socialist Federal Republic of Yugoslavia) Ivan Šangulin	(Germany) FV Wannsee	
		Total Transfer Fees	

== Match results ==
=== Legend ===
Win Draw Loss

=== Bundesliga ===
16 August 1969 1	Hertha BSC	1–0	MSV Duisburg	Olympiastadion, Berlin
15:30 CET	Weber 35'	Report		Attendance: 75,000; Referee: Walter Horstmann (Groß Escherde)

23 August 1969 2	TSV Munich 1860	2–0	Hertha BSC	Stadion an der Grünwalder Straße, Munich
15:30 CET	Blankenburg 24'; Fischer 75'	Report		Attendance: 26,000; Referee: Walter Eschweiler (Euskirchen)

30 August 1969 3	Hertha BSC	2–1	Alemannia Aachen	Olympiastadion, Munich
15:30 CEST	Brungs 28'; Patzke 88' (pen.)	Report	Krott 81'	Attendance: 30,000; Referee: Elmar Schäfer (Neustadt/Rübenberge)

6 September 1969 4	Rot-Weiss Essen	5–2	Hertha BSC	Georg-Melches-Stadion, Essen
15:30 CET	Lippens 2', 9', 65'; Littek 29'; Jung 73'	Report	Horr 20'; Patzke 33' (pen.)	Attendance: 27,000; Referee: Klaus Ohmsen (Hamburg)

13 September 1969 5	VfB Stuttgart	1–4	Hertha BSC	Neckarstadion, Stuttgart
15:30 CET	Weidmann 8'	Report	Gayer 67'; Olsson 69' (o.g.); Bredenfeld 74'; Horr 79'	Attendance: 25,000; Referee: Horst Bonacker (Quadrath-Ichendorf)

26 September 1969 6	Hertha BSC	1–0	1. FC Köln	Olympiastadion, Berlin
20:00 CET	Gayer 63'	Report		Attendance: 88,075; Referee: Alfons Betz (Regensburg)

4 October 1969 7	Hannover 96	2–1	Hertha BSC	Niedersachsenstadion, Hannover
15:30 CET	Witt 30' (o.g.); Heynckes 85' (pen.)	Report	Gayer 58'	Attendance: 31,000; Referee: Helmut Fritz (Ludwigshafen)

11 October 1969 8	Hertha BSC	1–0	Hamburger SV	Olympiastadion, Berlin
15:30 CET	Gayer 70'	Report		Attendance: 80,000; Referee: Berthold Schmidt (Hermesdorf)

15 October 1969 9	Rot-Weiß Oberhausen	3–1	Hertha BSC	Niederrheinstadion, Oberhausen
20:00 CET	Laskowsky 2'; Dausmann 49'; Fritsche 70'	Report	Wild 88'	Attendance: 26,000; Referee: Alfred Ott (Rheinbrohl)

25 October 1969 10	Hertha BSC	3–0	FC Schalke 04	Olympiastadion, Berlin
15:30 CET	Brungs 8', 22'; Altendorff 41'	Report		Attendance: 50,000; Referee: Kurt Tschenscher (Mannheim)

30 October 1969 11	Bayern Munich	1–2	Hertha BSC	Grünwalder Stadion, Munich
20:00 CET	Müller 24' (penalty missed) 78'	Report	Weber 61'; Steffenhagen 84'	Attendance: 27,000; Referee: Horst Bonacker (Quadrath-Ichendorf)

8 November 1969 12	Hertha BSC	1–1	Borussia Mönchengladbach	Olympiastadion, Berlin
15:30 CET	Wild 90'	Report	Laumen 81'	Attendance: 80,000; Referee: Diedrich Basedow (Hamburg)

15 November 1969 13	Eintracht Frankfurt	1–1	Hertha BSC	Waldstadion, Frankfurt
15:30 CET	Trinklein 60'	Report	Weber 58'	Attendance: 34,000; Referee: Hans-Joachim Weyland (Oberhausen)

29 November 1969 14	Hertha BSC	3–0	1. FC Kaiserslautern	Olympiastadion, Berlin
15:30 CET	Enders 5'; Altendorff 40'; Brungs 79'	Report		Attendance: 30,000; Referee: Hans Voß (Münster)

5 December 1969 15	Borussia Dortmund	0–0	Hertha BSC	Stadion Rote Erde, Dortmund
20:00 CET		Report		Attendance: 25,000; Referee: Karl-Heinz Picker (Hamburg)

12 December 1969 16	Hertha BSC	2–0	Eintracht Braunschweig	Olympiastadion, Berlin
20:00 CET	Weber 87'; Kaack 90' (o.g.)	Report		Attendance: 25,000; Referee: Hans Hillebrand (Essen)

20 December 1969 17	SV Werder Bremen	1–0	Hertha BSC	Weserstadion, Bremen
15:30 CET	Schütz 32'	Report		Attendance: 11,000; Referee: Gerd Hennig (Duisburg)

10 May 1970 18	MSV Duisburg	1–3	Hertha BSC	Wedaustadion, Duisburg
20:00 CET	Wißmann 39'	Report	Brungs 6'; Horr 26', 36'	Attendance: 15,000; Referee: Diedrich Basedow (Hamburg)

25 March 1970 19	Hertha BSC	4–2	TSV Munich 1860	Olympiastadion, Berlin
20:00 CET	Altendorff 21'; Brungs 25', 31'; Gayer 73'	Report	Kohlars 14'; Fischer 29'	Attendance: 21,000; Referee: Gerd Siepe (Attendorn)

24 January 1970 20	Alemannia Aachen	2–4	Hertha BSC	Old Tivoli, Aachen
15:30 CET	Martinelli 10' (pen.); Witt 22' (o.g.)	Report	Gayer 27'; Patzke 44'; Brungs 70', 79'	Attendance: 10,000; Referee: Jan Redelfs (Hannover)

25 February 1970 21	Hertha BSC	4–0	Rot-Weiss Essen	Olympiastadion, Berlin
20:00 CET	Brungs 15', 65'; Horr 54', 82'	Report		Attendance: 30,000; Referee: Dieter Berner (Enzberg)

22 April 1970 22	Hertha BSC	3–1	VfB Stuttgart	Olympiastadion, Berlin
20:00 CET	Wild 20'; Ferschl 35'; Steffenhagen 60'	Report	Haug 87' (pen.)	Attendance: 8,000; Referee: Gerd Hennig (Duisburg)

14 February 1970 23	1. FC Köln	5–1	Hertha BSC	Müngersdorfer Stadion, Cologne
15:30 CET	Biskup 6'; Löhr 32', 83'; Hemmersbach 57'; Overath 86' (rig)	Report	Gayer 75' (pen.)	Attendance: 26,000; Referee: Karl-Heinz Picker (Hamburg)

7 April 1970 24	Hertha BSC	1–1	Hannover 96	Olympiastadion, Berlin
20:00 CET	Gayer 12'	Report	Siemensmeyer 86'	Attendance: 20,000; Referee: Heinz Aldinger (Waiblingen)

25 April 1970 25	Hamburger SV	1–0	Hertha BSC	Volksparkstadion, Hamburg
15:30 CET	Seeler 87'	Report		Attendance: 10,000; Referee: Heinz Aldinger (Waiblingen)

1º April 1970 26	Hertha BSC	1–0	Rot-Weiß Oberhausen	Olympiastadion, Berlin
20:00 CET	Horr 56'	Report		Attendance: 22,000; Referee: Franz Wengenmayer (Munich)

14 March 1970 27	FC Schalke 04	1–3	Hertha BSC	Glückauf-Kampfbahn, Gelsenkirchen
15:30 CET	Neuser 36'	Report	Weber 52'; Gayer 57' (pen.); Brungs 74'	Attendance: 20,000; Referee: Helmut Fritz (Ludwigshafen)

21 March 1970 28	Hertha BSC	0–4	Bayern Munich	Berlin
15:30 CET		Report	Brenninger 7', 17'; Kupferschmidt 37'; Roth 59'	Stadium: Olympiastadion; Attendance: 70,000; Referee: Walter Eschweiler (Euskirchen)

28 March 1970 29	Borussia Mönchengladbach	1–1	Hertha BSC	Bökelbergstadion, Mönchengladbach
15:30 CET	Köppel 18'	Report	Steffenhagen 61'	Attendance: 25,000; Referee: Walter Horstmann (Groß Escherde)

4 April 1970 30	Hertha BSC	2–0	Eintracht Frankfurt	Olympiastadion, Berlin
15:30 CET	Horr 69'; Steffenhagen 84'	Report		Attendance: 30,000; Referee: Paul Kindervater (Köln)

11 April 1970 31	1. FC Kaiserslautern	1–0	Hertha BSC	Betzenbergstadion, Kaiserslautern
15:30 CET	Rehhagel 80' (pen.)	Report		Attendance: 11,000; Referee: Hans-Joachim Weyland (Oberhausen)

18 April 1970 32	Hertha BSC	9–1	Borussia Dortmund	Olympiastadion, Berlin
15:30 CET	Horr 1', 21'; Gayer 3', 26', 45', 49'; Brungs 37'; Wild 65'; Bredenfeld 88'	Report	Boduszek 80'	Attendance: 25,000; Referee: Helmut Fritz (Ludwigshafen)

30 April 1970 33	Eintracht Braunschweig	1–2	Hertha BSC	Stadion an der Hamburger Straße, Braunschweig
15:30 CET	Grzyb 86'	Report	61' Horr; 64' Brungs	Attendance: 10,000; Referee: Hans Voß (Münster)

3 May 1970 34	Hertha BSC	4–1	SV Werder Bremen	Olympiastadion, Berlin
15:30 CET	Horr 23', 61'; Brungs 55'; Bredenfeld 60'	Report	Hasebrink 18'	Attendance: 33,000; Referee: Franz Heumann (Ansbach)

=== DFB-Pokal ===
15 April 1970 First round	Pirmasens	1–2	Hertha BSC	Sportpark Husterhöhe, Pirmasens
CET	Weinkauff 76'	Report	Brungs 20' (pen.); Steffenhagen 54'	Attendance: 15,000; Referee: Alfred Köhler (Wanne-Eickel)

28 July 1970 Round of 16	FC Schalke 04	0–0	Hertha BSC	Glückauf-Kampfbahn, Gelsenkirchen
CET		Report		Attendance: 20,000; Referee: Heinz Quindeau (Ludwigshafen)

1 August 1970 Round of 16	Hertha BSC	4–0	FC Schalke 04	Olympiastadion, Berlin
CET	Horr 15' (rig); Gayer 77'; Ferschl 79'; Weber 90'	Report		Attendance: 50,000; Referee: Gerhard Schulenburg (Hamburg)

6 August 1970 Quarter-finals	Alemannia Aachen	1–0	Hertha BSC	Old Tivoli, Aachen
20:00 CET		Report	Hoffmann 89' (pen.)	Attendance: 20,000; Referee: Heinz Aldinger (Waiblingen)

=== Inter-Cities Fairs Cup ===
==== First round ====
17 September 1969 First leg	Las Palmas (Spain)	0–0	(Germany) Hertha BSC	Estadio Insular, Las Palmas
CET		Report		Attendance: 20,000; Referee: José Rosa Nunes (Portugal)

1 October 1969 Second leg	Hertha BSC (Germany)	1–0	(Spain) Las Palmas	Olympiastadion, Berlin
CET	Patzke 70' (pen.)	Report		Attendance: 20,000; Referee: Zdeněk Valeš (Czechoslovakia)

==== Second round ====
12 November 1969 First leg	Hertha BSC (Germany)	3–1	(Italy) Juventus	Olympiastadion, Berlin
	Gayer 16'; Wild 31'; Steffenhagen 79'	Report	Anastasi 14'	Attendance: 30,000; Referee: Ken Burns (England)

26 November 1969 Second leg	Juventus (Italy)	0–0	(Germany) Hertha BSC	Stadio Comunale, Turin
		Report		Attendance: 20.=,000; Referee: Milivoje Gugulović (Yugoslavia)

Hertha BSC won 3–1 on aggregate.

==== Round of 16 ====
30 December 1969 First leg	Vitória de Setúbal (Portugal)	1–1	(Germany) Hertha BSC	Estádio do Bonfim, Setúbal
	Tomé 10'	Report	Horr 3'	Attendance: 10,000; Referee: Anton Bucheli (Switzerland)

7 January 1970 Second leg	Hertha BSC (Germany)	1–0	(Portugal) Vitória de Setúbal	Olympiastadion, Berlin
	Steffenhagen 59'	Report		Attendance: 20,000; Referee: Jim Finney (England)

Hertha BSC won 2–1 on aggregate.

==== Quarter-finals ====
4 March 1970	Hertha BSC (Germany)	1–0	(Italy) Inter Milan	Olympiastadion, Berlin
	Horr 22'	Report		Attendance: 40,000; Referee: Gilbert Droz (Switzerland)

18 March 1970	Internazionale (Italy)	2–0	(Germany) Hertha BSC	San Siro, Milan
	Boninsegna 47', 60' (pen.)	Report		Attendance: 15,000; Referee: Georges Uhlen (France)

Internazionale won 2–1 on aggregate.

== Friendlies ==
May 31, 1970	(United States) Atlanta Chiefs	2–2	(Germany) Hertha BSC	Atlanta–Fulton County, Atlanta
	Metchick (?)	Report	Horr (?); Brungs (?)	Attendance: 1,782
