= 1971–72 Hertha BSC season =

Hertha BSC
1971–72 season
- Owner: Gerhard Bautz
- Manager: Fiffi Kronsbein
- Stadium: Olympiastadion
- Bundesliga: 6th place
- DFB-Pokal: First round
- 1971–72 UEFA Cup: Second round
- Top goalscorer: League: Erwin Hermandung (34); All: Erwin Hermandung (40)
- Highest home attendance: 73,000 (vs. Bayern Munich)
- Lowest home attendance: 5,000 (vs. Bochum)
- Average home league attendance: 24,588
Home colours

The 1971–72 Hertha BSC season was the club's 99th year of existence and season and the 5th season in the top flight of German football. The season began on 14 August 1971 against VfB Stuttgart and finished on 28 June 1972 against VfL Bochum.

== Summary ==
In the 1971–72 season, Hertha BSC, coached by Fiffi Kronsbein, finished the 1971–72 Bundesliga championship in 6th place. In the 1971–72 DFB-Pokal, Hertha Berlin was eliminated in the first round by FC Schalke 04. In the 1971–72 UEFA Cup, Hertha BSC was eliminated in the second round by AC Milan.

== Squad ==
No.	Pos.	Nation	Player
—	GK	GER	Volkmar Groß
—	GK	GER	Michael Kellner
—	GK	GER	Thomas Zander
—	DF	GER	Hans Eder
—	DF	GER	Peter Enders
—	DF	GER	Karl-Heinz Ferschl
—	DF	GER	Frank Hanisch
—	DF	GER	Jürgen Lahn
—	DF	GER	Bernd Patzke
—	DF	GER	Jürgen Rumor
—	DF	GER	Michael Sziedat
—	DF	GER	Uwe Witt
—	DF	GER	Hans Zengerle

No.	Pos.	Nation	Player
—	MF	GER	Erich Beer
—	MF	ROU	Vasile Gergely
—	MF	GER	Erwin Hermandung
—	MF	GER	Detlef Schulz
—	MF	GER	Andreas Schumann
—	MF	GER	Wolfgang Sidka
—	MF	HUN	Zoltán Varga
—	MF	GER	Tasso Wild
—	FW	GER	Wolfgang Gayer
—	FW	GER	Peter Gutzeit
—	FW	GER	Lorenz Horr
—	FW	GER	Hans-Jürgen Sperlich
—	FW	GER	Arno Steffenhagen

== Technical staff ==
- Coach: Fiffi Kronsbein
- Assistant Coach: Hans Eder
- Goalkeeping coach:
- Athletic trainers:

== Transfers ==
Transfers In
Date	Name	From	Transfer Fee
Summer 1972	(Germany) Erich Beer	(Germany) Rot-Weiss Essen	
Summer 1972	(Germany) Peter Gutzeit	(Germany) Pirmasens	
Summer 1972	(Germany) Erwin Hermandung	(Germany) Alemannia Aachen	
		Total Transfer Fees	

Transfer Out
Date	Name	To	Transfer Fee
Summer 1971	(Germany) Hans-Joachim Altendorff	(Germany) Wacker 04 Berlin	
Summer 1971	(Germany) Franz Brungs	(Germany) Nürnberg	
Summer 1971	(Germany) Reinhard Gröger	(Germany) Hertha Zehlendorf	
Summer 1971	(Germany) Norbert Janzon	(Germany) Wormatia Worms	
Summer 1971	(Germany) Bernd Laube	(Germany) Wormatia Worms	
Summer 1971	(Germany) Jürgen Weber	(Germany) SV Werder Bremen	
		Total Transfer Fees	

== Results ==
=== Bundesliga ===
14 August 1971 1	VfB Stuttgart	3–0	Hertha BSC	Neckarstadion, Stuttgart
15:30 CET	Ettmayer 21', 36'; Entenmann 48'	Report		Attendance: 30,000; Referee: Rudolf Schröck (Riegelsberg)

21 August 1971 2	Hertha BSC	2–2	Bayern Munich	Olympiastadion, Berlin
15:30 CET	Steffenhagen 24'; Varga 69'	Report	Hoeneß 47'; Müller 73'	Attendance: 72,000; Referee: Gerhard Schulenburg (Hamburg)

28 August 1971 3	Hannover 96	1–1	Hertha BSC	Niedersachsenstadion, Hannover
15:30 CET	Keller 68'	Report	Beer 49'	Attendance: 26,000; Referee: Karl Riegg (Augsburg)

1 September 1971 4	Hertha BSC	1–0	MSV Duisburg	Olympiastadion, Berlin
20:00 CET	Hermandung 44'	Report		Attendance: 48,000; Referee: Herbert Lutz (Bremen)

4 September 1971 5	Hamburger SV	1–2	Hertha BSC	Volksparkstadion, Hamburg
15:30 CET	Volkert 33'	Report	Varga 51'; Steffenhagen 82'	Attendance: 28,000; Referee: Walter Eschweiler (Euskirchen)

11 September 1971 6	Hertha BSC	1–1	1. FC Köln	Olympiastadion, Berlin
15:30 CET	Gutzeit 18'	Report	Overath 59'	Attendance: 60,000; Referee: Rudolf Frickel (Munich)

18 September 1971 7	Eintracht Frankfurt	1–1	Hertha BSC	Waldstadion, Frankfurt
15:30 CET	Kalb 28' (pen.)	Report	Sperlich 52'	Attendance: 28,000; Referee: Walter Engel (Reimsbach)

25 September 1971 8	Hertha BSC	2–1	Borussia Dortmund	Olympiastadion, Berlin
15:30 CET	Horr 52', 87'	Report	Bücker 42'	Attendance: 35,000; Referee: Wolfgang Dittmer (Mutterstadt)

2 October 1971 9	FC Schalke 04	4–0	Hertha BSC	Glückauf-Kampfbahn, Gelsenkirchen
15:30 CET	Kremers 14'; Braun 21', 56'; Fischer 88'	Report		Attendance: 37,000; Referee: Heinz Aldinger (Waiblingen)

13 October 1971 10	Hertha BSC	1–1	Fortuna Düsseldorf	Olympiastadion, Berlin
20:00 CET	Beer 1'	Report	45' Baltes	Attendance: 25,000; Referee: Ohmsen

16 October 1971 11	Hertha BSC	2–1	SV Werder Bremen	Olympiastadion, Berlin
15:30 CET	Varga 26'; Steffenhagen 45'	Report	Baumann 15'	Attendance: 23,000; Referee: Manfred Hamer (Bockum-Hövel)

23 October 1971 12	Eintracht Braunschweig	1–1	Hertha BSC	Stadion an der Hamburger Straße, Braunschweig
15:30 CET	Bründl 32' (pen.)	Report	Witt 74'	Attendance: 13,000; Referee: Horst Bonacker (Quadrath-Ichendorf)

30 October 1971 13	Hertha BSC	2–0	Rot-Weiß Oberhausen	Olympiastadion, Berlin
15:30 CET	Horr 25' (pen.), 58'	Report		Attendance: 20,000; Referee: Philipp Geng (Freiburg)

6 November 1971 14	Borussia Mönchengladbach	5–2	Hertha BSC	Bökelbergstadion, Mönchengladbach
15:30 CET	Sieloff 40' (pen.); Wloka 43'; Heynckes 55'; Danner 59'; Wimmer 66'	Report	Varga 57'; Horr 78' (pen.)	Attendance: 16,000; Referee: Kurt Tschenscher (Mannheim)

13 November 1971 15	Hertha BSC	2–1	1. FC Kaiserslautern	Olympiastadion, Berlin
15:30 CET	Horr 3'; Hermandung 81'	Report	Vogt 31'	Attendance: 12,000; Referee: Paul Kindervater (Köln)

27 November 1971 16	Arminia Bielefeld	1–1	Hertha BSC	Bielefelder Alm, Bielefeld
15:30 CET	Brücken 22'	Report	Hermandung 36'	Attendance: 12,000; Referee: Dieter Berner (Enzberg)

11 December 1971 17	Hertha BSC	1–2	VfL Bochum	West Berlin
15:30	Gayer 47'		Walitza 4'; Wosab 25'	Stadium: Olympiastadion; Attendance: 5,000; Referee: Franz Wengenmeyer (Munich)

22 January 1972 17	Hertha BSC	2–1	VfB Stuttgart	Olympiastadion, Berlin
15:30 CET	Horr 51' (pen.); Steffenhagen 74'	Report	Köppel 3'	Attendance: 12,000; Referee: Wilfried Hilker (Bochum)

29 January 1972 19	Bayern Munich	1–0	Hertha BSC	Munich
15:30 CET	Schneider 53'	Report		Stadium: Grünwalder Stadion; Attendance: 15,000; Referee: Horst Herden

5 February 1972 20	Hertha BSC	3–1	Hannover 96	Olympiastadion, Berlin
20:00 CET	Hermandung 20'; Horr 81'; Gayer 87'	Report	Ferschl 52' (o.g.)	Attendance: 10,000; Referee: Dieter Berner (Enzberg)

19 February 1972 21	MSV Duisburg	2–0	Hertha BSC	Wedaustadion, Duisburg
15:30 CET	Lehmann 14' (pen.); Riedl 44'	Report		Attendance: 9,000; Referee: Dieter Heckeroth (Frankfurt/Main)

26 February 1972 22	Hertha BSC	2–0	Hamburger SV	Olympiastadion, Berlin
15:30 CET	Beer 5', 60'	Report		Attendance: 16,000; Referee: Hans Hillebrand (Essen)

4 March 1972 23	1. FC Köln	3–0	Hertha BSC	Müngersdorfer Stadion, Cologne
15:30 CET	Flohe 71', 85'; Löhr 90'	Report		Attendance: 11,000; Referee: Jan Redelfs (Hannover)

11 March 1972 24	Hertha BSC	0–0	Eintracht Frankfurt	Olympiastadion, Berlin
15:30 CET		Report		Attendance: 13,000; Referee: Gerd Hennig (Duisburg)

18 March 1972 25	Borussia Dortmund	1–2	Hertha BSC	Stadion Rote Erde, Dortmund
15:30 CET	Weinkauff 26'	Report	Hermandung 77'; Beer 87'	Attendance: 10,000; Referee: Klaus Ohmsen (Hamburg)

25 March 1972 26	Hertha BSC	3–0	FC Schalke 04	Olympiastadion, Berlin
15:30 CET	Steffenhagen 12'; Beer 62'; Gayer 89'	Report		Attendance: 40,000; Referee: Karl Riegg (Augsburg)

8 April 1972 27	Fortuna Düsseldorf	1–0	Hertha BSC	Flinger Broich, Düsseldorf
15:30 CET	Budde 56'	Report		Attendance: 15,000; Referee: Norbert Fuchs (Herdorf)

15 April 1972 28	Werder Bremen	5–0	Hertha BSC	Weserstadion, Bremen
15:30 CET	Laumen 7'; Weist 18', 56', 88'; Neuberger 51'	Report		Attendance: 9500; Referee: Hans Voß (Münster)

22 April 1972 29	Hertha BSC	1–0	Eintracht Braunschweig	Olympiastadion, Berlin
15:30 CET	Zengerle 90'	Report		Attendance: 9,000; Referee: Manfred Hamer (Bockum-Hövel)

6 May 1972 30	Rot-Weiss Oberhausen	5–2	Hertha BSC	Niederrheinstadion, Oberhausen
15:30 CET	Hoff 13', 16', 76'; Zengerle 54' (o.g.); Schumacher 88'	Report	Steffenhagen 11', 21'	Attendance: 5000; Referee: Kurt Tschenscher (Mannheim)

27 May 1972 31	Hertha BSC	2–1	Borussia Mönchengladbach	Olympiastadion, Berlin
15:30 CET	Hermandung 1'; Beer 33'	Report	Heynckes 80'	Attendance: 10,000; Referee: Roth (Salzgitter)

3 June 1972 32	1. FC Kaiserslautern	3–4	Hertha BSC	Betzenbergstadion, Kaiserslautern
15:30 CET	Bitz 62'; Vogt 72'; Hošić 76'	Report	5' Hermandung; 10' Beer; 44' Steffenhagen; 66' Horr	Attendance: 7,000; Referee: Wilfried Hilker (Bochum)

24 June 1972 33	Hertha BSC	1–1	Arminia Bielefeld	Olympiastadion, Berlin
15:30 CET	Horr 33'	Report	Stegmayer 45'	Attendance: 7,000; Referee: Winfried Hanschke (Burgsdorf)

28 June 1972 34	VfL Bochum	4–2	Hertha BSC	Stadion an der Castroper Straße, Bochum
20:00	Walitza 35', 70', 77'; Balte 39'		Horr 49' (pen.); Gutzeit 81'	Attendance: 5,000; Referee: Norbert Fuchs (Herdorf)

=== DFB-Pokal ===
==== First round ====
4 December 1971 1st leg	FC Schalke 04	3–1	Hertha BSC	Glückauf-Kampfbahn, Gelsenkirchen
CET	Rüssmann 43'; van Haaren 68'; Fischer 80'	Report	Horr 85' (pen.)	Attendance: 12,000; Referee: Rudolf Schröck (Riegelsberg)

15 December 1971 2nd leg	Hertha BSC	2–0	FC Schalke 04	Olympiastadion, Berlin
CET	Steffenhagen 30'; Beer 78', 86'	Report		Attendance: 8,000; Referee: Diedrich Basedow (Hamburg)

=== UEFA Cup ===
==== First Round ====
15 September 1971 1st leg	Hertha BSC (Germany)	3–1	(Sweden) IF Elfsborg	Olympiastadion, Berlin
19:30 CET	Hermandung 35'; Varga 44'; Steffenhagen 66'	Report	Rökaas 53'	Attendance: 6,897; Referee: Michalakis Kiriakides (Cyprus)

29 September 1971 2nd leg	IF Elfsborg (Sweden)	1–4	(Germany) Hertha BSC	Ryavallen, Borås
19:00 CET	Sundh 59'	Report	Horr 43', 81'; Steffenhagen 77'; Gutzeit 83'	Attendance: 1,124; Referee: Jack Taylor (England)

==== Second Round ====
20 October 1971 1st leg	AC Milan (Italy)	4–2	(Germany) Hertha BSC	Stadio San Siro, Milan
21:00 CET	Prati 39', 85'; Benetti 62'; Biasiolo 64'	Report	Steffenhagen 15'; Beer 51'	Attendance: 16,070; Referee: Ferdinand Marschall (Austria)

3 November 1971 2nd leg	Hertha BSC (Germany)	2–1	(Italy) AC Milan	Olympiastadion, Berlin
19:30 CET	Horr 15' (pen.), 89'	Report	Bigon 13'	Attendance: 21,123; Referee: John Carpenter (Ireland)
