= 1970–71 Hertha BSC season =

Hertha BSC
1970–71 season
- Owner: Gerhard Bautz
- Manager: Fiffi Kronsbein
- Stadium: Olympiastadion
- Bundesliga: 3rd place
- DFB-Pokal: Round of 16
- Inter-Cities Fairs Cup: Second round
- Top goalscorer: League: Erwin Hermandung (34); All: Erwin Hermandung (40)
- Highest home attendance: 85,000 (vs. 1. FC Köln)
- Lowest home attendance: 18,000 (vs. Werder Bremen)
- Average home league attendance: 45,529
Home colours

The 1970–71 Hertha BSC season was the club's 98th year of existence and season and the 4th season in the top-flight of German football. The season began on 15 August 1970 against 1. FC Kaiserslautern and finished on 5 June 1971 against Arminia Bielefeld.

== Summary ==
In the 1970–71 season, Hertha Berlin, coached by Fiffi Kronsbein, finished the Bundesliga in 3rd place. In the DFB-Pokal, Hertha Berlin was eliminated in the round of 16 by Borussia Mönchengladbach. In the Inter-Cities Fairs Cup, Hertha Berlin was eliminated in the second round by Czech club Spartak Trnava.

== Squad ==
No.	Pos.	Nation	Player
—	GK	GER	Volkmar Groß
—	GK	GER	Michael Kellner
—	GK	GER	Thomas Zander
—	DF	GER	Hans Eder
—	DF	GER	Peter Enders
—	DF	GER	Karl-Heinz Ferschl
—	DF	GER	Reinhard Gröger
—	DF	GER	Frank Hanisch
—	DF	GER	Jürgen Lahn
—	DF	GER	Bernd Patzke
—	DF	GER	Jürgen Rumor
—	DF	GER	Michael Sziedat
—	DF	GER	Uwe Witt
—	DF	GER	Hans Zengerle
—	MF	GER	Hans-Joachim Altendorff

No.	Pos.	Nation	Player
—	MF	GER	Norbert Janzon
—	MF	ROU	Vasile Gergely
—	MF	GER	Detlef Schulz
—	MF	GER	Andreas Schumann
—	MF	GER	Wolfgang Sidka
—	MF	HUN	Zoltán Varga
—	MF	GER	Tasso Wild
—	MF	GER	Bernd Laube
—	FW	GER	Franz Brungs
—	FW	GER	Wolfgang Gayer
—	FW	GER	Lorenz Horr
—	FW	GER	Hans-Jürgen Sperlich
—	FW	GER	Arno Steffenhagen
—	FW	GER	Jürgen Weber

== Technical staff ==
- Coach: Fiffi Kronsbein
- Assistant Coach: Hans Eder
- Goalkeeping coach:
- Athletic trainers:

== Transfers ==
Transfers In
Date	Name	From	Transfer Fee
Summer 1970	(Romania) Vasile Gergely	(Romania) Dinamo București	
Summer 1970	(Germany) Reinhard Gröger	(Germany) Hertha Zehlendorf	
Summer 1970	(Germany) Michael Kellner	(Germany) Hertha Zehlendorf	
Summer 1970	(Germany) Jürgen Rumor	(Germany) 1. FC Kaiserslautern	
		Total Transfer Fees	

Transfer Out
Date	Name	To	Transfer Fee
Summer 1970	(Germany) Hermann Bredenfeld	(Germany) TSV 1860 Munich	
Summer 1970	(Germany) Manfred Eichberg	(Germany) Tennis Borussia Berlin	
Summer 1970	(Austria) Gernot Fraydl	(Germany) TSV 1860 Munich	
Summer 1970	(Germany) Lothar Groß	(Germany) Tasmania Berlin	
Summer 1970	(Germany) Werner Ipta	(Germany) Tasmania Berlin	
Summer 1970	(Germany) Karl-Heinz Leufgen	(Germany) TSV 1860 Munich	
		Total Transfer Fees	

== Match results ==
=== Legend ===
Win Draw Loss

=== Bundesliga ===
15 August 1970 1	Hertha BSC	5–3	1. FC Kaiserslautern	Olympiastadion, Berlin
15:30 CET	Brungs 26'; Schwager 44' (o.g.); Horr 68' (pen.); Steffenhagen 77'; Weber 82'	Report	Rehhagel 5' (pen.); Hošić 30'; Fuchs 45'	Attendance: 60,000; Referee: Gerd Siepe (Attendorn)

22 August 1970 2	Bayern Munich	1–0	Hertha BSC	Munich
15:30 CET	Brenninger 72'	Report		Stadium: Grünwalder Stadion; Attendance: 35,000; Referee: Gerd Hennig

28 August 1970 3	Hertha BSC	3–1	Rot-Weiss Oberhausen	Olympiastadion, Berlin
20:00 CET	Steffenhagen 48'; Horr 87'; Brungs 89'	Report	Brozulat 35'	Attendance: 70,000; Referee: Rudolf Frickel (Munich)

5 September 1970 4	FC Schalke 04	0–1	Hertha BSC	Glückauf-Kampfbahn, Gelsenkirchen
15:30 CET		Report	Sperlich 88'	Attendance: 32,000; Referee: Diedrich Basedow (Hamburg)

12 September 1970 5	Hertha BSC	3–2	1. FC Köln	Olympiastadion, Berlin
15:30 CET	Patzke 51'; Brungs 55'; Horr 78'	Report	Parits 48', 73'	Attendance: 85,000; Referee: Kurt Tschenscher (Mannheim)

19 September 1970 6	SV Werder Bremen	0–0	Hertha BSC	Weserstadion, Bremen
15:30 CET		Report		Attendance: 22,000; Referee: Hans Voß (Münster)

23 September 1970 7	Hertha BSC	1–0	Eintracht Braunschweig	Olympiastadion, Berlin
20:00 CET	Wild 41'	Report		Attendance: 62,000; Referee: Manfred Hamer (Bockum-Hövel)

26 September 1970 8	MSV Duisburg	1–0	Hertha BSC	Wedaustadion, Duisburg
15:30 CET	Budde 67'	Report		Attendance: 21,000; Referee: Heinz Aldinger (Waiblingen)

3 October 1970 9	Hertha BSC	2–0	VfB Stuttgart	Olympiastadion, Berlin
15:30 CET	Wild 57'; Horr 75'	Report		Attendance: 20,000; Referee: Gerd Hennig (Duisburg)

7 October 1970 10	Kickers Offenbach	1–0	Hertha BSC	Stadion am Bieberer Berg, Offenbach am Main
20:00 CET	Kremers 84' (pen.)	Report		Attendance: 20,000; Referee: Alfred Ott (Rheinbrohl)

10 October 1970 11	Borussia Dortmund	3–1	Hertha BSC	Stadion Rote Erde, Dortmund
15:30 CET	Trimhold 7'; Weist 65'; Ritschel 75'	Report	Gayer 77'	Attendance: 26,000; Referee: Franz Wengenmayer (Munich)

24 October 1970 12	Hertha BSC	1–1	Rot-Weiss Essen	Olympiastadion, Berlin
15:30 CET	Steffenhagen 55'	Report	Lippens 35'	Attendance: 33,000; Referee: Ferdinand Biwersi (Bliesransbach)

31 October 1970 13	Eintracht Frankfurt	1–3	Hertha BSC	Waldstadion, Frankfurt
15:30 CET	Schämer 13'	Report	49' Varga; 70' Gayer; 82' Weber	Attendance: 13,000; Referee: Walter Horstmann (Groß Escherde)

7 November 1970 14	Hertha BSC	4–2	Borussia Mönchengladbach	Olympiastadion, Berlin
15:30 CET	Weber 28'; Steffenhagen 38'; Horr 47'; Varga 88' (pen.)	Report	66' Laumen; 67' Heynckes	Attendance: 80,000; Referee: Dieter Heckeroth (Frankfurt/Main)

14 November 1970 15	Hamburger SV	0–0	Hertha BSC	Volksparkstadion, Hamburg
15:30 CET		Report		Attendance: 33,000; Referee: Hans-Joachim Weyland (Oberhausen)

28 November 1970 16	Hertha BSC	0–0	Hannover 96	Olympiastadion, Berlin
15:30 CET		Report		Attendance: 32,000; Referee: Wilfried Hilker (Bochum)

4 December 1970 17	Arminia Bielefeld	1–1	Hertha BSC	Bielefelder Alm, Bielefeld
20:00 CET	Kohl 10'	Report	Varga 19'	Attendance: 28,000; Referee: Diedrich Basedow (Hamburg)

23 January 1971 18	1. FC Kaiserslautern	2–0	Hertha BSC	Betzenbergstadion, Kaiserslautern
15:30 CET	Vogt 73', 90'	Report		Attendance: 15,000; Referee: Gerd Hennig (Duisburg)

30 January 1971 19	Hertha BSC	3–3	Bayern Munich	Olympiastadion, Berlin
15:30 CET	Gayer 19', 48'; Horr 79' (pen.)	Report	Müller 5'; Brenninger 24'; Hoeneß 77'	Attendance: 70,000; Referee: Walter Eschweiler

3 March 1971 20	Rot-Weiss Oberhausen	1–1	Hertha BSC	Niederrheinstadion, Oberhausen
20:00 CET	Kobluhn 89'	Report	19' Horr	Attendance: 15,000; Referee: Klaus Ohmsen (Hamburg)

13 February 1971 21	Hertha BSC	2–1	FC Schalke 04	Olympiastadion, Berlin
15:30 CET	Horr 22'; Gayer 69'	Report	Wüst 87'	Attendance: 42,000; Referee: Rudolf Schröck (Riegelsberg)

27 February 1971 22	1. FC Köln	3–2	Hertha BSC	Müngersdorfer Stadion, Cologne
15:30 CET	Thielen 44', 54'; Biskup 77' (pen.)	Report	Varga 63'; Horr 76'	Attendance: 28,000; Referee: Elmar Schäfer (Neustadt/Rübenberge)

6 March 1971 23	Hertha BSC	3–1	SV Werder Bremen	Olympiastadion, Berlin
15:30 CET	Gayer 19', 40'; Sperlich 47'	Report	Görts 67'	Attendance: 18,000; Referee: Hans Hillebrand (Essen)

13 March 1971 24	Eintracht Braunschweig	2–1	Hertha BSC	Stadion an der Hamburger Straße, Braunschweig
15:30 CET	Erler 23'; Deppe 44'	Report	30' Steffenhagen	Attendance: 24,000; Referee: Hans-Joachim Weyland (Oberhausen)

20 March 1971 25	Hertha BSC	3–1	MSV Duisburg	Olympiastadion, Berlin
15:30 CET	Gayer 25'; Horr 37'; Steffenhagen 69'	Report	Budde 44' (pen.)	Attendance: 25,000; Referee: Dieter Wohlfarth (Bergen-Enkheim)

27 March 1971 26	VfB Stuttgart	1–1	Hertha BSC	Neckarstadion, Stuttgart
15:30 CET	Weiß 58'	Report	Gayer 11'	Attendance: 20,000; Referee: Walter Engel (Reimsbach)

3 April 1971 27	Hertha BSC	3–1	Kickers Offenbach	Olympiastadion, Berlin
15:30 CET	Varga 13'; Gayer 26'; Horr 35' (pen.)	Report	Gecks 24'	Attendance: 24,000; Referee: Paul Kindervater (Köln)

17 April 1971 28	Hertha BSC	5–2	Borussia Dortmund	Olympiastadion, Berlin
15:30 CET	Horr 20' (rig), 75' (rig), 86'; Steffenhagen 44'; Gayer 84'	Report	54' Schütz; 73' Held	Attendance: 27,000; Referee: Karl Riegg (Augsburg)

1º May 1971 29	Rot-Weiss Essen	0–3	Hertha BSC	Georg-Melches-Stadion, Essen
15:30 CET		Report	Horr 13'; Steffenhagen 74'; Gayer 78'	Attendance: 25,000; Referee: Gerhard Schulenburg (Hamburg)

8 May 1971 30	Hertha BSC	6–2	Eintracht Frankfurt	Olympiastadion, Berlin
15:30 CET	Horr 8', 34', 48', 81' (pen.); Steffenhagen 31'; Gayer 90'	Report	Kalb 10'; Hölzenbein 19'	Attendance: 47,000; Referee: Herbert Lutz (Bremen)

14 May 1971 31	Borussia Mönchengladbach	4–0	Hertha BSC	Bökelbergstadion, Mönchengladbach
20:00 CET	Laumen 4', 52'; Köppel 8'; Heynckes 56'	Report		Attendance: 25,000; Referee: Dieter Heckeroth (Frankfurt/Main)

22 May 1971 32	Hertha BSC	2–0	Hamburger SV	Olympiastadion, Berlin
15:30 CET	Gayer 56'; Horr 64'	Report		Attendance: 42,000; Referee: Hans Hillebrand (Essen)

29 May 1971 33	Hannover 96	1–1	Hertha BSC	Niedersachsenstadion, Hannover
15:30 CET	Bertl 5'	Report	Wild 86'	Attendance: 33,000; Referee: Walter Engel (Reimsbach)

5 June 1971 34	Hertha BSC	0–1	Arminia Bielefeld	Olympiastadion, Berlin
15:30 CET		Report	Roggensack 70'	Attendance: 37,000; Referee: Rudolf Frickel [Munich)

=== DFB-Pokal ===
12 December 1970 First round	SG Wattenscheid 09	1–2	Hertha BSC	Lohrheidestadion, Bochum
CET	Grede 16'	Report	Horr 45', 77'	Attendance: 10,000; Referee: Walter Horstmann (Groß Escherde)

20 February 1971 Round of 16	Hertha BSC	1–3	Borussia Mönchengladbach	Olympiastadion, Berlin
CET	Gayer 72'	Report	Dietrich 28'; Köppel 67'; Heynckes 78'	Attendance: 50,000; Referee: Gerhard Schulenburg (Hamburg)

=== Inter-Cities Fairs Cup ===
==== First Round ====
16 September 1970 First leg	B1901 (Denmark)	2–4	(Germany) Hertha BSC	Nykøbing Falster Idrætspark, Nykøbing Falster
CET	Olsen 25'; H. E. Hansen 78'	Report	Brungs 19', 28'; Gayer 68'; Steffenhagen 70'	Attendance: 8,000; Referee: Kjell Wahlen (Norway)

30 September 1970 Second leg	Hertha BSC (Germany)	4–1	(Denmark) B1901	Olympiastadion, Berlin
CET	Horr 9'; Brungs 55', 82'; Gergely 87'	Report	Rasmussen 31'	Attendance: 2,135; Referee: Georg Krutelev (Finland)

==== Second round ====
21 October 1970 First leg	Hertha BSC (Germany)	1–0	(Czechoslovakia) Spartak Trnava	Olympiastadion, Berlin
CET	Horr 85'	Report		Attendance: 15,129; Referee: Constantin Petrea (Romania)

28 October 1970 Second leg	Spartak Trnava (Czechoslovakia)	3–1	(Germany) Hertha BSC	Stadio Anton Malatinský, Trnava
CET	Kuna 7'; Martinkovic 36'; Bóžik 76'	Report	Gayer 71'	Attendance: 10,700; Referee: Karl Göppel (Switzerland)
