= Uwe Witt (footballer) =

German footballer (1939–2025)

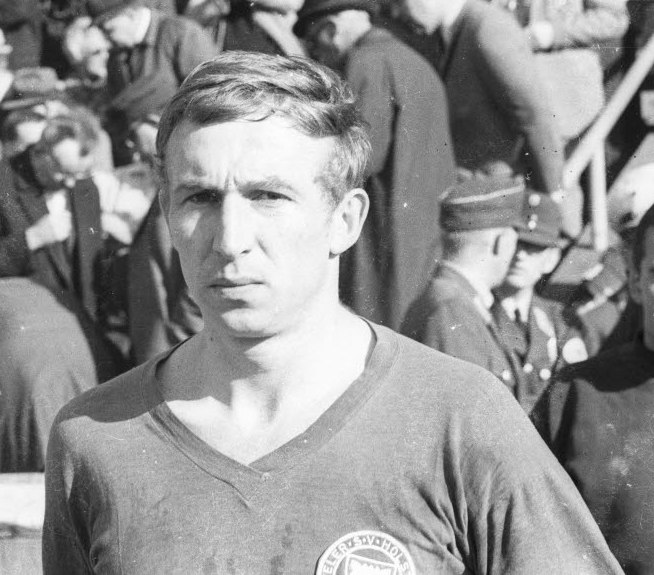
- Witt in the 1966–67 season

Personal information
- Full name: Uwe Witt
- Date of birth: 25 January 1939
- Place of birth: Brunsbüttel, Schleswig-Holstein, Germany
- Date of death: 22 May 2025 (aged 84)
- Place of death: Berlin, Germany
- Height: 1.82 m (6 ft 0 in)
- Position: Sweeper

Youth career
- ???–1957: TSV Brunsbüttelkoog

Senior career*
Years	Team	Apps	(Gls)
1957–1959	Hamburger SV Amateure		
1959–1961	Concordia von 1907	46	(4)
1961–1963	FC St. Pauli	46	(3)
1963–1965	SV Arminia Hannover	61	(6)
1965–1967	Holstein Kiel	60	(2)
1967–1972	Hertha BSC	139	(1)

International career
1957	West Germany U–18	1	(0)
- * Club domestic league appearances and goals

Uwe Witt (25 January 1939 – 22 May 2025) was a German footballer who played as a sweeper. He played for Hertha BSC throughout his career in the Bundesliga. He also briefly represented his home country of West Germany for the 1957 UEFA European Under-18 Championship.

== Career ==
=== Oberliga and Regionalliga ===
Throughout his youth career, Witt played for TSV Brunsbüttelkoog.

At the age of 18, he then moved to the amateurs of Hamburger SV Amateure for two years. Alongside of his teammates Charly Dörfel and Jürgen Kurbjuhn, won the DFB regional cup with a 4–1 win against the selection of Hesse in 1959 with the Hamburg selection.

From 1959 to 1961, he played 46 league games with four goals in the Oberliga Nord, representing local rivals Concordia von 1907 before he made another 46 Oberliga appearances with three goals at FC St. Pauli until 1963. The former HSV amateur made his debut for Concordia on 1 November 1959 in a home game against SV Werder Bremen in the Oberliga Nord. In his first season, he made 19 appearances and scored two goals, mostly playing on the left wing. Witt played for Concordia alongside players such as Günter Woitas and Günter Schlegel as well as goalkeeper Holger Obermann but Witt would only make five appearances in his inaugural season. In his second season with Concordia, Witt, who is now active as a left winger, was a regular with 27 league appearances and two goals. In the last two seasons of the old first-class Oberliga Nord, he played for St. Pauli alongside teammates Rolf Bergeest, Horst Haecks, Peter Osterhoff and Ingo Porges as the club remained in the upper half of the seasonal tables. In the first year at the Millerntor, St. Pauli finished fourth and sixth in 1963. Since St. Pauli hadn't been nominated for the newly installed Bundesliga either, he moved to SV Arminia Hannover in the inaugural 1963–64 Regionalliga. In the first year, he finished third with the "Blues", St. Pauli celebrated the championship and runners-up and city rivals Hannover 96 were promoted to the Bundesliga. Nevertheless, Arminia's performance was a success and his cooperation with teammates such as Lothar Ulsaß, Gerhard Elfert and Helmut Kafka was another experience in his personal development as a competitive footballer. During the 1964–65 Oberliga, he finished fourth with Arminia. After 61 Regionalliga appearances with seven goals, he moved to Holstein Kiel in 1965. The 1965 champions managed to finish third twice, but despite playing alongside players such as Peter Ehlers, Franz-Josef Hönig, Gerd Koll, Gerd Saborowski and Günter Tams and their high results, failed to get promoted to the Bundesliga. Throughout his two seasons, he played another 60 games with an additional two goals.

After his tenure with Holstein Kiel, Witt moved to Hertha BSC in 1967 for DM 40,000 and achieved promotion to the Bundesliga in his first season in 1967–68 together with players such as Hans-Joachim Altendorff, Volkmar Groß, Werner Ipta, Dieter Krafczyk, Rudolf Kröner and Tasso Wild.

=== Bundesliga ===
In his first season of the Bundesliga throughout the 1968–69 Bundesliga, he played all 34 league games for Hertha BSC under coach Fiffi Kronsbein, as did teammates Franz Brungs and Arno Steffenhagen. Throughout the following two seasons, playing alongside players such as Wolfgang Gayer, Lorenz Horr László Gergely and Zoltán Varga, the club finished third with Hertha and thus qualified for the 1971–72 UEFA Cup. Throughout his career with Hertha, he was later selected as captain for the team.

In addition to 123 games in the Bundesliga, he played 16 games in the UEFA Cup. Witt was in action in the international matches against B1901, Spartak Trnava, Elfsborg and against AC Milan who had international greats such as Angelo Anquilletti, Fabio Cudicini, Pierino Prati, Gianni Rivera and Karl-Heinz Schnellinger. In the wake of the 1971 Bundesliga scandal, he was suspended for the following two seasons and prematurely retired due to not paying his fine of DM 15,000. Despite other players of the scandal later being pardoned by the DFB, Witt remained the only exception as his ban lasted indefinitely.

Even after retirement, Witt continued to deny his involvement in the scandal until his death on 22 May 2025.

== Personal life ==
On 4 November 1970, Witt made headlines on Bild magazine with the statement referring to women's football: "If my wife plays: divorce!".

Following his retirement, Witt lived in Spain and worked in the real estate industry.

== International career ==
Witt was called up to be a part of the West Germany squad for the 1957 UEFA European Under-18 Championship held in Spain with his only appearance being in a 1–1 draw against the host nation. He also represented the NFV XI in eight games throughout 1962 to 1966 in eight appearances. Following his move to Hertha BSC, he played for the Berlin national football team on two occasions.
