= 1969–70 FC Bayern Munich season =

5th season of Bayern Munich in the Bundesliga

Bayern Munich
1969–70 season
- Chairman: Wilhelm Neudecker
- Manager: Branko Zebec; Udo Lattek
- Stadium: Grünwalder Stadion
- Bundesliga: 2nd
- DFB-Pokal: Quarter-finals
- European Cup: First round
- Top goalscorer: League: Gerd Müller (38); All: Gerd Müller (42)

The 1969–70 FC Bayern Munich season was the club's fifth season in Bundesliga.

== Team kit ==
Home	Away	Away 2	Away 3

== Review and events ==
The club could not defend the championship in this season. Furthermore, Bayern was defeated in the first round of the European Cup and in the quarterfinals of the cup by Saint Étienne and 1. FC Nürnberg respectively. The season was overshadowed by a very harsh winter, therefore games had to be postponed because of frozen pitches between January and April 1970.

== Squad ==
Note: Flags indicate national team as defined under FIFA eligibility rules; some limited exceptions apply. Players may hold more than one non-FIFA nationality.

No.	Pos.	Nation	Player
—	GK	GER	Sepp Maier
—	GK	GER	Manfred Seifert
—	DF	GER	Hans-Georg Schwarzenbeck
—	DF	GER	Herward Koppenhöfer
—	DF	AUT	Peter Pumm
—	DF	GER	Werner Olk
—	DF	GER	Franz Beckenbauer
—	DF	GER	Peter Kupferschmidt
—	DF	GER	Wolfgang Gierlinger
—	DF	GER	Helmut Nerlinger
—	DF	GER	Benno Zellermayer

No.	Pos.	Nation	Player
—	MF	GER	Franz Roth
—	MF	GER	Helmut Schmidt
—	MF	AUT	August Starek
—	MF	GER	Klaus Klein
—	FW	GER	Dieter Brenninger
—	FW	GER	Rainer Ohlhauser
—	FW	GER	Gerd Müller
—	FW	GER	Karl-Heinz Mrosko
—	FW	GER	Günther Michl
—	FW	GER	Peter Stegmann

== Match results ==
=== Legend ===
Win Draw Loss

=== Bundesliga ===
==== League fixtures and results ====
16 August 1969 1	Bayern Munich	4–0	Rot-Weiss Essen	Munich
15:30 CET	Müller 2', 18', 56' (pen.); Ohlhauser 82'	Report		Stadium: Grünwalder Stadion; Attendance: 30,000; Referee: Ferdinand Biwersi

23 August 1969 2	Borussia Mönchengladbach	2–1	Bayern Munich	Mönchengladbach
15:30 CET	Kaiser 48'; Laumen 72'	Report	Starek 11'	Stadium: Bökelbergstadion; Attendance: 32,000; Referee: Gerhard Schulenburg

27 August 1969 3	Bayern Munich	2–1	Eintracht Frankfurt	Munich
20:00 CET	Brenninger 44'; Michl 87'	Report	Schwarzenbeck 16' (o.g.)	Stadium: Grünwalder Stadion; Attendance: 29,000; Referee: Alfred Köhler

6 September 1969 4	1. FC Kaiserslautern	0–0	Bayern Munich	Kaiserslautern
20:00 CET		Report		Stadium: Betzenbergstadion; Attendance: 35,000; Referee: Ewald Regely

12 September 1969 5	Bayern Munich	3–0	Borussia Dortmund	Munich
20:00 CET	Pumm 13'; Brenninger 53'; Beckenbauer 86'	Report		Stadium: Grünwalder Stadion; Attendance: 35,000; Referee: Helmut Fritz

27 September 1969 6	Eintracht Braunschweig	0–4	Bayern Munich	Braunschweig
15:30 CET		Report	Michl 10'; Ohlhauser 42'; Müller 70'; Beckenbauer 73'	Stadium: Eintracht-Stadion; Attendance: 23,81 0 Referee: Paul Kindervater

4 October 1969 7	Bayern Munich	4–1	Werder Bremen	Munich
15:30 CET	Müller 32', 61', 67', 90'	Report	Schmidt 53'	Stadium: Grünwalder Stadion; Attendance: 25,000; Referee: Hans-Joachim Weyland

10 October 1969 8	MSV Duisburg	4–2	Bayern Munich	Duisburg
20:00 CET	Budde 30'; Wißmann 67'; Sondermann 82'; Bella 85'	Report	Ohlhauser 34'; Müller 50'	Stadium: Wedaustadion; Attendance: 38,000; Referee: Jan Redelfs

15 October 1969 9	Bayern Munich	2–0	1860 Munich	Munich
19:30 CET	Brenninger 3'; Müller 35' (pen.)	Report		Stadium: Grünwalder Stadion; Attendance: 40,000; Referee: Karl-Heinz Fork

25 October 1969 10	Alemannia Aachen	1–3	Bayern Munich	Aachen
15:30 CET	Kapellmann 88'	Report	Schwarzenbeck 18'; Müller 26' (pen.); Beckenbauer 49'	Stadium: Old Tivoli; Attendance: 25,000; Referee: Edmund Bien

30 October 1969 11	Bayern Munich	1–2	Hertha BSC	Munich
20:00 CET	Müller 24' (penalty missed) 78'	Report	Weber 61'; Steffenhagen 84'	Stadium: Grünwalder Stadion; Attendance: 27,000; Referee: Horst Bonacker

8 November 1969 12	VfB Stuttgart	2–3	Bayern Munich	Stuttgart
15:30 CET	Haug 60'; Olsson 78'	Report	Roth 6'; Brenninger 32'; Müller 66'	Stadium: Neckarstadion; Attendance: 72,000; Referee: Ferdinand Biwersi

15 November 1969 13	Bayern Munich	1–2	1. FC Köln	Munich
15:30 CET	Müller 48'	Report	Rühl 14'; Simmet 60'	Stadium: Grünwalder Stadion; Attendance: 44,000; Referee: Gerhard Schulenburg

29 November 1969 14	Hannover 96	0–1	Bayern Munich	Hannover
17:00 CET		Report	Ohlhauser 43'	Stadium: Niedersachsenstadion; Attendance: 20,000; Referee: Alfred Ott

6 December 1969 15	Bayern Munich	2–1	Hamburger SV	Munich
15:30 CET	Müller 30', 60'	Report	Schulz 86'	Stadium: Grünwalder Stadion; Attendance: 14,000; Referee: Gerd Hennig

13 December 1969 16	Rot-Weiß Oberhausen	3–3	Bayern Munich	Oberhausen
15:30 CET	Brozulat 9'; Kobluhn 41'; Dausmann 61'	Report	Ohlhauser 30'; Müller 37'; Brenninger 53' (pen.)	Stadium: Niederrheinstadion; Attendance: 12,000; Referee: Gerhard Schulenburg

24 February 1970 17	Bayern Munich	6–0	Schalke 04	Munich
20:00 CET	Müller 5'; Beckenbauer 12'; Brenninger 20', 70'; Roth 70', 88'	Report		Stadium: Grünwalder Stadion; Attendance: 25,000; Referee: Horst Herden

11 March 1970 18	Rot-Weiß Essen	1–1	Bayern Munich	Essen
19:30 CET	Fürhoff 53'	Report	Kupferschmidt 8'	Stadium: Georg-Melches-Stadion; Attendance: 30,000; Referee: Herbert Lutz

15 April 1970 19	Bayern Munich	1–0	Borussia Mönchengladbach	Munich
20:00 CET	Roth 28'	Report		Stadium: Grünwalder Stadion; Attendance: 40,000; Referee: Horst Herden

3 March 1970 20	Eintracht Frankfurt	2–1	Bayern Munich	Frankfurt
20:00 CET	Trinklein 56'; Nickel 75'	Report	Müller 57'	Stadium: Waldstadion; Attendance: 38,000; Referee: Klaus Ohmsen

31 January 1970 21	Bayern Munich	1–1	1. FC Kaiserslautern	Munich
15:30 CET	Müller 55'	Report	Friedrich 33'	Stadium: Grünwalder Stadion; Attendance: 11,000; Referee: Berthold Schmidt

7 February 1970 22	Borussia Dortmund	1–3	Bayern Munich	Dortmund
15:30 CET	Held 47'	Report	Müller 2', 51', 88'	Stadium: Stadion Rote Erde; Attendance: 25,000; Referee: Alfred Ott

14 February 1970 23	Bayern Munich	5–1	Eintracht Braunschweig	Munich
15:30 CET	Mrosko 40'; Müller 42', 62'; Ohlhauser 46'; Roth 75'	Report	Maas 14'	Stadium: Grünwalder Stadion; Attendance: 15,000; Referee: Karl-Heinz Fork

21 April 1970 24	Werder Bremen	1–0	Bayern Munich	Bremen
19:30 CET	Görts 68'	Report	Nerlinger (red card) 20'	Stadium: Weserstadion; Attendance: 31,000; Referee: Horst Bonacker

28 February 1970 25	Bayern Munich	2–0	MSV Duisburg	Munich
15:30 CET	Müller 8'; Mrosko 74'	Report		Stadium: Grünwalder Stadion; Attendance: 16,000; Referee: Ferdinand Biwersi

17 March 1970 26	1860 Munich	2–1	Bayern Munich	Munich
15:30 CET	Kohlars 12'; Fischer 22'	Report	Ohlhauser 50'	Stadium: Grünwalder Stadion; Attendance: 40,000; Referee: Kurt Tschenscher

14 March 1970 27	Bayern Munich	6–0	Alemannia Aachen	Munich
15:30 CET	Müller 18', 84' (pen.); Kupferschmidt 28'; Beckenbauer 58'; Roth 62', 69'	Report		Stadium: Grünwalder Stadion; Attendance: 11,500; Referee: Walter Engel

21 March 1970 28	Hertha BSC	0–4	Bayern Munich	Berlin
15:30 CET		Report	Brenninger 7', 17'; Kupferschmidt 37'; Roth 59'	Stadium: Olympic Stadium; Attendance: 70,000; Referee: Walter Eschweiler

28 March 1970 29	Bayern Munich	1–2	VfB Stuttgart	Munich
15:30 CET	Müller 42'	Report	Weidmann 38'; Olsson 83'	Stadium: Grünwalder Stadion; Attendance: 13,000; Referee: Helmut Fritz

4 April 1970 30	1. FC Köln	0–2	Bayern Munich	Cologne
15:30 CET		Report	Müller 67', 77'; Pumm (red card) 40'	Stadium: Müngersdorfer Stadion; Attendance: 36,000; Referee: Walter Horstmann

11 April 1970 31	Bayern Munich	7–2	Hannover 96	Munich
15:30 CET	Müller 9', 13'; Beckenbauer 14'; Ohlhauser 29'; Mrosko 69'; Brenninger 73'; Roth 75'	Report	Siemensmeyer 37' (pen.); Breuer 51'	Stadium: Grünwalder Stadion; Attendance: 12,000; Referee: Alfred Köhler

18 April 1970 32	Hamburger SV	1–3	Bayern Munich	Hamburg
15:30 CET	Hönig 41'	Report	Mrosko 47', 69'; Ohlhauser 72'	Stadium: Volksparkstadion; Attendance: 23,000; Referee: Hans-Joachim Weyland

30 April 1970 33	Bayern Munich	6–2	Rot-Weiß Oberhausen	Munich
20:00 CET	Müller 1', 4', 10', 53'; Roth 26'; Brenninger 62'	Report	Dausmann 31', 72'	Stadium: Grünwalder Stadion; Attendance: 8,000; Referee: Günter Linn

3 May 1970 34	Schalke 04	2–2	Bayern Munich	Gelsenkirchen
20:00 CET	Lütkebohmert 72', 84'	Report	Müller 58'; Ohlhauser 65'	Stadium: Glückauf-Kampfbahn; Attendance: 10,000; Referee: Wolfgang Link

==== League standings ====
Pos	Team	Pld	W	D	L	GF	GA	GD	Pts	Qualification or relegation
1	Borussia Mönchengladbach (C)	34	23	5	6	71	29	+42	51	Qualification to European Cup first round
2	Bayern Munich	34	21	5	8	88	37	+51	47	Qualification to Inter-Cities Fairs Cup first round
3	Hertha BSC	34	20	5	9	67	41	+26	45	Qualification to Inter-Cities Fairs Cup first round
4	1. FC Köln	34	20	3	11	83	38	+45	43	Qualification to Inter-Cities Fairs Cup first round
5	Borussia Dortmund	34	14	8	12	60	67	−7	36	

Source: www.dfb.de
Rules for classification: 1) points; 2) goal difference; 3) number of goals scored.
(C) Champions

=== DFB-Pokal ===
25 March 1970 1st Round	SG Wattenscheid 09	1–6	Bayern Munich	Bochum-Wattenscheid
	Grede 90'		Ohlhauser 3'; Müller 7', 50', 66'; Kupferschmidt 12'; Brenninger 60' (pen.)	Stadium: Lohrheidestadion; Attendance: 12,000; Referee: Rudolf Schröck

29 July 1970 Round of 16	Bayern Munich	4–0	SSV Jahn Regensburg	Munich
	Müller 20'; Roth 37'; Maas 50'; Mrosko 71'			Stadium: Olympiastadion; Attendance: 20,000; Referee: Karl Riegg

5 August 1970 Quarterfinals	1. FC Nürnberg	2–1	Bayern Munich	Nuremberg
	Stegmayer 17'; Kröner 31'		Roth 64'; Schwarzenbeck (red card) 70'	Stadium: Städtisches Stadion; Attendance: 70,000; Referee: Walter Eschweiler

=== European Cup ===
17 September 1969 1st Round	Bayern Munich	2–0	(France) Saint-Étienne	Munich
20:15 CET	Brenninger 22'; Roth 53'			Stadium: Grünwalder Stadion; Attendance: 38,275; Referee: Jim Finney (England)

1 October 1969 1st Round	Saint-Étienne (France)	3–0 (3–2 agg.)	Bayern Munich	Saint-Étienne
20:30 CET	Revelli 2', 59'; Keïta 81'			Stadium: Stade Geoffroy-Guichard; Attendance: 35,000; Referee: Josef Krnávek (Czechoslovakia)
