= 1969–70 Inter-Cities Fairs Cup =

1969–1970 Inter-Cities Fairs Cup
Final positions
- Champions: (England) Arsenal (1st title)
- Runners-up: (Belgium) Anderlecht

Tournament statistics
- Matches played: 126
- Top scorer: (Belgium) Paul Van Himst (10 goals)

The 1969–70 Inter-Cities Fairs Cup was the 12th Inter-Cities Fairs Cup. The competition was won by Arsenal over two legs in the final against Anderlecht. It was the first of Arsenal's two European trophies, the other being the European Cup Winners' Cup in 1993–94.

== First round ==
Team 1	Agg.	Team 2	1st leg	2nd leg
Valur (Iceland)	0–8	(Belgium) Anderlecht	0–6	0–2
Jeunesse Esch (Luxembourg)	3–6	(Northern Ireland) Coleraine	3–2	0–4
Dunfermline Athletic (Scotland)	4–2	(France) Bordeaux	4–0	0–2
Vojvodina (Socialist Federal Republic of Yugoslavia)	1–2	(Poland) Gwardia Warszawa	0–1	1–1
Hvidovre (Denmark)	1–4	(Portugal) Porto	1–2	0–2
Dundee United (Scotland)	1–3	(England) Newcastle United	1–2	0–1
Vitória de Guimarães (Portugal)	2–1	(Czechoslovakia) Baník Ostrava	1–0	1–1
Rosenborg (Norway)	1–2	(England) Southampton	1–0	0–2
Vitória de Setúbal (Portugal)	7–2	(Romania) Rapid București	3–1	4–1
Liverpool (England)	14–0	(Republic of Ireland) Dundalk	10–0	4–0
Las Palmas (Spain)	0–1	(West Germany) Hertha BSC	0–0	0–1
Juventus (Italy)	5–2	(Bulgaria) Lokomotiv Plovdiv	3–1	2–1
Lausanne-Sport (Switzerland)	2–4	(Hungary) Győr	1–2	1–2
Barcelona (Spain)	6–0	(Denmark) B 1913	4–0	2–0
Hansa Rostock (East Germany)	3–2	(Greece) Panionios	3–0	0–2
Internazionale (Italy)	4–0	(Czechoslovakia) Sparta Prague	3–0	1–0
Zürich (Switzerland)	4–5	(Scotland) Kilmarnock	3–2	1–3
Slavia Sofia (Bulgaria)	3–1	(Spain) Valencia	2–0	1–1
1860 Munich (West Germany)	3–4	(Norway) Skeid	2–2	1–2
Dinamo Bacău (Romania)	7–0	(Malta) Floriana	6–0	1–0
Charleroi (Belgium)	5–2	(Socialist Federal Republic of Yugoslavia) Zagreb	2–1	3–1
Rouen (France)	2–1	(Netherlands) Twente	2–0	0–1
Sporting CP (Portugal)	6–2	(Austria) LASK Linz	4–0	2–2
Arsenal (England)	3–1	(Northern Ireland) Glentoran	3–0	0–1
Carl Zeiss Jena (East Germany)	1–0	(Turkey) Altay	1–0	0–0
Aris (Greece)	1–4	(Italy) Cagliari	1–1	0–3
Sabadell (Spain)	3–5	(Belgium) Club Brugge	2–0	1–5
Partizan (Socialist Federal Republic of Yugoslavia)	2–3	(Hungary) Újpest	2–1	0–2
Stuttgart (West Germany)	4–1	(Sweden) Malmö FF	3–0	1–1
Metz (France)	2–3	(Italy) Napoli	1–1	1–2
Hannover 96 (West Germany)	2–4	(Netherlands) Ajax	2–1	0–3
Wiener SC (Austria)	5–6	(Poland) Ruch Chorzów	4–2	1–4

=== First leg ===
10 September 1969

Vitória de Guimarães (Portugal)	1–0	(Czechoslovakia) Baník Ostrava
Manuel 10'

Estádio D. Afonso Henriques, Guimarães
Attendance: 10,000
Referee: Adolfo Bueno Perales (Spain)

15 September 1969

Dundee United (Scotland)	1–2	(England) Newcastle United
Mitchell 76'	Report	Davies 56', 62'

Tannadice Park, Dundee
Attendance: 21,000
Referee: Peter Coates (Ireland)

16 September 1969

Liverpool (England)	10–0	(Republic of Ireland) Dundalk
Evans 1', 38'; Lawler 10'; Smith 24', 67'; Graham 36', 82'; Lindsay 56'; Thompson 69'; Callaghan 76'	Report

Anfield, Liverpool
Attendance: 32,656
Referee: John Lewis (Wales)

17 September 1969

Juventus (Italy)	3–1	(Bulgaria) Lokomotiv Plovdiv
Vieri 27' (pen.); Leonardi 31'; Castano 71'		Vasilev 1'

Turin

17 September 1969

Internazionale (Italy)	3–0	(Czechoslovakia) Sparta Prague
Boninsegna 68', 79'; Reif 84'

San Siro, Milan
Attendance: 20,000
Referee: János Biróczky (Hungary)

17 September 1969

Dinamo Bacău (Romania)	6–0	(Malta) Floriana
Grima 1' (o.g.); Dembrovschi 11', 73' (pen.), 86'; Băluță 24'; Ene 87'	Report

Stadionul 23 August, Bacău
Attendance: 8,000
Referee: Kostas Xanthos (Greece)

17 September 1969

Aris (Greece)	1–1	(Italy) Cagliari
Spiridon 12'		Martiradonna 82'

Thessaloniki

17 September 1969

Metz (France)	1–1	(Italy) Napoli
Szczepaniak 67'		Bosdaves 8'

Metz

17 September 1969

Slavia Sofia (Bulgaria)	2–0	(Spain) Valencia
Grigorov 42'; T. Kolev 68' (pen.)	Report

Stadion Slavia, Sofia
Attendance: 5,000
Referee: Tibor Wotava (Hungary)

17 September 1969

VfB Stuttgart (Germany)	3–0	(Sweden) Malmö FF
Björklund 36' (o.g.); Olsson 50'; Haug 87'

Neckarstadion, Stuttgart
Attendance: 5,000
Referee: Robert Frauciel (France)

18 September 1969

Vitória de Setúbal (Portugal)	3–1	(Romania) Rapid București
José Maria 41', 87'; Guerreiro 64'		Neagu 71'

Estádio José Alvalade, Lisbon
Attendance: 10,000
Referee: Daniel Zariquiegi (Spain)

18 September 1969

Jeunesse Esch (Luxembourg)	3–2	(Northern Ireland) Coleraine
Allamano 48', 53', 89'	Report	Curley 16'; Murray 60'

Stade de la Frontière, Esch-sur-Alzette
Attendance: 1,400
Referee: Joseph Minnoy (Belgium)

24 September 1969

Hvidovre (Denmark)	1–2	(Portugal) Porto
Sørensen 29' (pen.)		Ernesto 62', 70'

Hvidovre Stadion, Copenhagen
Attendance: 2,000
Referee: Karl Keller (Switzerland)

24 September 1969

Sporting CP (Portugal)	4–0	(Austria) LASK Linz
Pedras 8'; Gonçalves 60'; Peres 72' (pen.); Lourenço 75'

Estádio José Alvalade, Lisbon
Attendance: 30,000
Referee: David Smith (England)

=== Second leg ===
30 September 1969

Dundalk (Republic of Ireland)	0–4	(England) Liverpool
	Report	Thompson 13', 31'; Graham 48'; Callaghan 81'

Oriel Park, Dundalk
Attendance: 6,000
Referee: Tom Wharton (Scotland)

Liverpool won 14–0 on aggregate.

1 October 1969

Lokomotiv Plovdiv (Bulgaria)	1–2	(Italy) Juventus
Vasilev 62'		Leonardi 21'; Anastasi 75'

Plovdiv

Juventus won 5–2 on aggregate.

1 October 1969

Sparta Prague (Czechoslovakia)	0–1	(Italy) Internazionale
		Boninsegna 6'

Letná Stadium, Prague
Attendance: 25,000
Referee: Eugen Boller (Switzerland)

Internazionale won 4–0 on aggregate.

28 September 1969

Floriana (Malta)	0–1	(Romania) Dinamo Bacău
	Report	Ene 32'

Empire Stadium, Gżira
Attendance: 8,000
Referee: Fabio Monti (Italy)

Dinamo Bacău won 7–0 on aggregate.

1 October 1969

Cagliari (Italy)	3–0	(Greece) Aris
Domenghini 10'; Riva 13'; Gori 76' (pen.)

Cagliari

The game was abandoned after Cagliari's third goal because three Greek players refused to return to the pitch after they were expelled by the police. UEFA ruled the 3–0 score as final.

Cagliari won 4–1 on aggregate.

1 October 1969

Napoli (Italy)	2–1	(France) Metz
Bianchi 41'; Improta 60' (pen.)		Hausser 70'

Naples

Napoli won 3–2 on aggregate.

1 October 1969

Valencia (Spain)	1–1	(Bulgaria) Slavia Sofia
Ansola 75'	Report	Grigorov 33'

Estadio Luis Casanova, Valencia
Attendance: 40,000
Referee: Roger Mouton (France)

Slavia Sofia won 3–1 on aggregate.

1 October 1969

Rapid București (Romania)	1–4	(Portugal) Vitória de Setúbal
Stelian 78'		Wágner 23' (pen.), 61' (pen.); José Maria 34'; Figueiredo 64'

Stadionul 23 August, Bucharest
Attendance: 70,000
Referee: Muzaffer Sarvan (Turkey)

Vitória de Setúbal won 7–2 on aggregate.

1 October 1969

Porto (Portugal)	2–0	(Denmark) Hvidovre
Salim 24'; Rolando 74'

Estádio das Antas, Porto
Attendance: 30,000
Referee: Mariano Medina Iglesias (Spain)

Porto won 4–1 on aggregate.

1 October 1969

LASK Linz (Austria)	2–2	(Portugal) Sporting CP
Leitner 81'		Gonçalves 40'; Lourenço 77'

Linzer Stadion, Linz
Attendance: 10,000
Referee: Helmut Bader (East Germany)

Sporting CP won 6–2 on aggregate.

1 October 1969

Newcastle United (England)	1–0	(Scotland) Dundee United
Dyson 90'	Report

St James' Park, Newcastle upon Tyne
Attendance: 37,470
Referee: Leo Callaghan (Wales)

Newcastle United won 3–1 on aggregate.

1 October 1969

Coleraine (Northern Ireland)	4–0	(Luxembourg) Jeunesse Esch
Wilson 11'; Dickson 73', 85'; Jennings 87'	Report

Coleraine Showgrounds, Coleraine
Attendance: 6,000
Referee: William O'Neill (Republic of Ireland)

Coleraine won 6–3 on aggregate.

1 October 1969

Malmö FF (Sweden)	1–1	(Germany) VfB Stuttgart
Larsson 65'		Weidmann 15'

Eleda Stadion, Malmö
Attendance: 2,500
Referee: Tage Sørensen (Denmark)

Stuttgart won 4–1 on aggregate.

2 October 1969

Baník Ostrava (Czechoslovakia)	1–1	(Portugal) Vitória de Guimarães
Guzik 73'		Artur 80'

Bazaly, Ostrava
Attendance: 9,000
Referee: Constantin Bărbulescu (Romania)

Vitória de Guimarães won 2–1 on aggregate.

== Second round ==
Team 1	Agg.	Team 2	1st leg	2nd leg
Anderlecht (Belgium)	13–4	(Northern Ireland) Coleraine	6–1	7–3
Dunfermline Athletic (Scotland)	3–1	(Poland) Gwardia Warszawa	2–1	1–0
Porto (Portugal)	0–1	(England) Newcastle United	0–0	0–1
Vitória de Guimarães (Portugal)	4–8	(England) Southampton	3–3	1–5
Vitória de Setúbal (Portugal)	3–3 (a)	(England) Liverpool	1–0	2–3
Hertha BSC (West Germany)	3–1	(Italy) Juventus	3–1	0–0
Győr (Hungary)	2–5	(Spain) Barcelona	2–3	0–2
Hansa Rostock (East Germany)	2–4	(Italy) Internazionale	2–1	0–3
Kilmarnock (Scotland)	4–3	(Bulgaria) Slavia Sofia	4–1	0–2
Skeid (Norway)	0–2	(Romania) Dinamo Bacău	0–0	0–2
Charleroi (Belgium)	3–3 (a)	(France) Rouen	3–1	0–2
Sporting CP (Portugal)	0–3	(England) Arsenal	0–0	0–3
Carl Zeiss Jena (East Germany)	3–0	(Italy) Cagliari	2–0	1–0
Club Brugge (Belgium)	5–5 (a)	(Hungary) Újpest	5–2	0–3
Stuttgart (West Germany)	0–1	(Italy) Napoli	0–0	0–1
Ajax (Netherlands)	9–1	(Poland) Ruch Chorzów	7–0	2–1

=== First leg ===
29 October 1969

Sporting CP (Portugal)	0–0	(England) Arsenal

Estádio José Alvalade, Lisbon
Attendance: 32,000
Referee: Dittmar Huber (Switzerland)

4 November 1969

Vitória de Guimarães (Portugal)	3–3	(England) Southampton
Mendes 12', 58'; Pinto 88' (pen.)		Channon 13'; Davies 63'; Paine 83'

Estádio D. Afonso Henriques, Guimarães
Attendance: 10,000
Referee: Pius Kamber (Switzerland)

12 November 1969

Hertha BSC (West Germany)	3–1	(Italy) Juventus
Gayer 16'; Wild 31'; Steffenhagen 79'		Anastasi 14'

Berlin

12 November 1969

Hansa Rostock (East Germany)	2–1	(Italy) Internazionale
Hergesell 63'; Sackritz 89'		Boninsegna 1'

Ostseestadion, Rostock
Attendance: 30,000
Referee: Arie van Gemert (Netherland)

22 October 1969

Skeid (Norway)	0–0	(Romania) Dinamo Bacău
	Report

Ullevaal Stadion, Oslo
Attendance: 7,250
Referee: Ejner Espersen (Denmark)

12 November 1969

Carl Zeiss Jena (East Germany)	2–0	(Italy) Cagliari
Rock 63'; Irmscher 73' (pen.)

Jena

12 November 1969

Stuttgart (West Germany)	0–0	(Italy) Napoli

Stuttgart

12 November 1969

Vitória de Setúbal (Portugal)	1–0	(England) Liverpool
Tomé 40'

Estádio do Bonfim, Setúbal
Attendance: 16,000
Referee: Antonio Sbardella (Italy)

19 November 1969

Porto (Portugal)	0–0	(England) Newcastle United

Estádio das Antas, Porto
Attendance: 25,000
Referee: Roland Marendaz (Switzerland)

=== Second leg ===
12 November 1969

Southampton (England)	5–1	(Portugal) Vitória de Guimarães
Costeado 13' (o.g.); Davies 54', pen.', 87'; Gabriel 55'; Channon 85'		Ademir 68'

The Dell, Southampton
Attendance: 21,414
Referee: Robert Frauciel (France)

Southampton won 8–4 on aggregate.

26 November 1969

Juventus (Italy)	0–0	(West Germany) Hertha BSC

Turin

Hertha BSC won 3–1 on aggregate.

26 November 1969

Internazionale (Italy)	3–0	(East Germany) Hansa Rostock
Jair 5'; Suárez 23'; Mazzola 32'

San Siro, Milan
Attendance: 48,000
Referee: Norman Burtenshaw (England)

Internazionale won 4–2 on aggregate.

29 October 1969

Dinamo Bacău (Romania)	2–0	(Norway) Skeid
Dembrovschi 47' (pen.), 68'	Report

Stadionul 23 August, Bacău
Attendance: 12,000
Referee: János Almási (Hungary)

Dinamo Bacău won 2–0 on aggregate.

26 November 1969

Cagliari (Italy)	0–1	(East Germany) Carl Zeiss Jena
		Stein 8'

Cagliari

Carl Zeiss Jena won 3–0 on aggregate.

26 November 1969

Napoli (Italy)	1–0	(West Germany) Stuttgart
Canzi 75'

Naples

Napoli won 1–0 on aggregate.

26 November 1969

Newcastle United (England)	1–0	(Portugal) Porto
Scott 22'

St James' Park, Newcastle upon Tyne
Attendance: 44,800
Referee: Wolfgang Riedel (East Germany)

Newcastle United won 1–0 on aggregate.

26 November 1969

Arsenal (England)	3–0	(Portugal) Sporting CP
Graham 43' (53); Radford 20'

Arsenal Stadium, London
Attendance: 35,253
Referee: Heinz Siebert (West Germany)

Arsenal won 3–0 on aggregate.

26 November 1969

Liverpool (England)	3–2	(Portugal) Vitória de Setúbal
Smith 60' (pen.); Evans 88'; Hunt 90'		Wágner 23' (pen.); Strong 56' (o.g.)

Anfield, Liverpool
Attendance: 41,633
Referee: Alfred Delcourt (Belgium)

Vitória de Setúbal won on the away goals rule.

== Third round ==
Team 1	Agg.	Team 2	1st leg	2nd leg
Anderlecht (Belgium)	3–3 (a)	(Scotland) Dunfermline Athletic	1–0	2–3
Newcastle United (England)	1–1 (a)	(England) Southampton	0–0	1–1
Vitória de Setúbal (Portugal)	1–2	(West Germany) Hertha BSC	1–1	0–1
Barcelona (Spain)	2–3	(Italy) Internazionale	1–2	1–1
Kilmarnock (Scotland)	1–3	(Romania) Dinamo Bacău	1–1	0–2
Rouen (France)	0–1	(England) Arsenal	0–0	0–1
Carl Zeiss Jena (East Germany)	4–0	(Hungary) Újpest	1–0	3–0
Napoli (Italy)	1–4	(Netherlands) Ajax	1–0	0–4 (a.e.t.)

=== First leg ===
10 December 1969

Napoli (Italy)	1–0	(Netherlands) Ajax
Manservisi 37'

Naples

17 December 1969

Kilmarnock (Scotland)	1–1	(Romania) Dinamo Bacău
Mathie 50'	Report	Băluță 73'

Rugby Park, Kilmarnock
Attendance: 25,000
Referee: Francis Rion (Belgium)

30 December 1969

Vitória de Setúbal (Portugal)	1–1	(West Germany) Hertha BSC
Tomé 10'		Horr 3'

Estádio do Bonfim, Setúbal
Attendance: 10,000
Referee: Anton Bucheli (Switzerland)

14 January 1970

Barcelona (Spain)	1–2	(Italy) Internazionale
Fusté 21'		Boninsegna 9'; Bertini 34'

Camp Nou, Barcelona
Attendance: 80,000
Referee: Jack Taylor (England)

=== Second leg ===
7 January 1970

Hertha BSC (West Germany)	1–0	(Portugal) Vitória de Setúbal
Steffenhagen 59'

Olympiastadion, Berlin
Attendance: 20,000
Referee: Jim Finney (England)

Hertha BSC won 2–1 on aggregate.

13 January 1970

Dinamo Bacău (Romania)	2–0	(Scotland) Kilmarnock
Ene 27', 79'	Report

Stadionul 23 August, Bacău
Attendance: 7,000
Referee: István Zsolt (Hungary)

Dinamo Bacău won 3–1 on aggregate.

28 January 1970

Internazionale (Italy)	1–0	(Spain) Barcelona
Boninsegna 15'

San Siro, Milan
Attendance: 10,000
Referee: Kurt Tschenscher (West Germany)

The game was abandoned in the 33rd minute due to low visibility and fog. It was replayed.

4 February 1970

Internazionale (Italy)	1–1	(Spain) Barcelona
Boninsegna 18'		Rexach 29'

San Siro, Milan
Attendance: 10,000
Referee: Kurt Tschenscher (West Germany)

Internazionale won 3–2 on aggregate.

21 January 1970

Ajax (Netherlands)	4–0 (a.e.t.)	(Italy) Napoli
Swart 35'; Suurendonk 109', 113', 116'

Amsterdam

The game was originally scheduled for 7 January, but was postponed due to fog in Amsterdam.

Ajax won 4–1 on aggregate.

== Quarter-finals ==
Team 1	Agg.	Team 2	1st leg	2nd leg
Anderlecht (Belgium)	3–3 (a)	(England) Newcastle United	2–0	1–3
Hertha BSC (West Germany)	1–2	(Italy) Internazionale	1–0	0–2
Dinamo Bacău (Romania)	1–9	(England) Arsenal	0–2	1–7
Carl Zeiss Jena (East Germany)	4–6	(Netherlands) Ajax	3–1	1–5

=== First leg ===
4 March 1970

Hertha BSC (West Germany)	1–0	(Italy) Internazionale
Horr 22'

Olympic Stadium, Berlin
Attendance: 40,000
Referee: Gilbert Droz (Switzerland)

11 March 1970

Dinamo Bacău (Romania)	0–2	(England) Arsenal
	Report	Sammels 58'; Radford 81'

Stadionul 23 August, Bacău
Attendance: 20,000
Referee: Gyula Emsberger (Hungary)

=== Second leg ===
18 March 1970

Internazionale (Italy)	2–0	(West Germany) Hertha BSC
Boninsegna 47', 60' (pen.)

San Siro, Milan
Attendance: 15,000
Referee: Georges Uhlen (France)

Internazionale won 2–1 on aggregate.

18 March 1970

Arsenal (England)	7–1	(Romania) Dinamo Bacău
Radford 7', 77'; George 24', 26'; Graham 45'; Sammels 59', 83'	Report	Băluță 33'

Arsenal Stadium, London
Attendance: 35,342
Referee: Willem Schalks (Netherlands)

Arsenal won 9–1 on aggregate.

== Semi-finals ==
Team 1	Agg.	Team 2	1st leg	2nd leg
Anderlecht (Belgium)	2–1	(Italy) Internazionale	0–1	2–0
Arsenal (England)	3–1	(Netherlands) Ajax	3–0	0–1

=== First leg ===
1 April 1970

Anderlecht (Belgium)	0–1	(Italy) Internazionale
		Boninsegna 49'

Émile Versé Stadium, Brussels
Attendance: 31,500
Referee: Thomas Wharton (Scotland)
8 April 1970

Arsenal (England)	3-0	(Netherlands) Ajax
George 16', 80' (pen.); Sammels 77'

=== Second leg ===
15 April 1970

Internazionale (Italy)	0–2	(Belgium) Anderlecht
		Bergholtz 3', 45'

San Siro, Milan
Attendance: 25,000
Referee: Rudi Glöckner (East Germany)

Anderlecht won 2–1 on aggregate.

== Final ==
Team 1	Agg.	Team 2	1st leg	2nd leg
Anderlecht (Belgium)	3–4	(England) Arsenal	3–1	0–3

=== First leg ===
22 April 1970

Anderlecht (Belgium)	3–1	(England) Arsenal
Devrindt 25'; Mulder 30', 74'		Kennedy 82'

Constant Vanden Stock Stadium, Anderlecht
Attendance: 37,000
Referee: Rudolf Scheurer (Switzerland)

=== Second leg ===
28 April 1970

Arsenal (England)	3–0	(Belgium) Anderlecht
Kelly 25'; Radford 75'; Sammels 76'

Highbury, London
Attendance: 51,612
Referee: Gerhard Kunze (East Germany)

Arsenal won 4–3 on aggregate.
