= Patzke =

Patzke is a surname. Notable people with the surname include:

- Bernd Patzke (born 1943), German footballer
- Greta Patzke (born 1974), German chemist
- Wolfgang Patzke (1959–2016), German footballer
