= Jürgen Weber =

German footballer (born 1944)

Personal information
- Date of birth: 29 June 1944 (age 82)
- Place of birth: Dortmund, North Rhine-Westphalia, West Germany
- Height: 1.74 m (5 ft 9 in)
- Positions: Midfielder; forward

Senior career*
| Years | Team | Apps | (Gls) |
- VfL Hörde
- SV Schüren
| 1965–1968 | Borussia Dortmund | | |
| 1968–1971 | Hertha BSC | | |
| 1971–1972 | Werder Bremen | | |
| 1972–1973 | Hellenic | | |
| 1973–1975 | Eintracht Braunschweig | | |
| 1975–1977 | Hannover 96 | | |
- * Club domestic league appearances and goals

Jürgen Weber (born 29 June 1944) is a retired German footballer. He primarily played for Borussia Dortmund, Hertha BSC, Eintracht Braunschweig and Hannover 96 throughout the late 1960s and 1970s as a midfielder and later, as a forward. He was also a part of the Dortmund squad that won the 1965–66 European Cup Winners' Cup.

== Club career ==
Following brief stints with Regionalliga clubs VfL Hörde and SV Schüren, Weber settled with Borussia Dortmund for the 1965–66 Bundesliga. He initially found himself within the Starting XI in the club and despite being seen as a promising player, he later lost his place as he was then made a reserve player. He also participated in the first round match in the 1965–66 European Cup Winners' Cup against Maltese club Floriana, scoring in the first legged match in a 1–5 away victory. However, despite the Schwarzgelben going on to achieve the title of the tournament, Weber's only other participation in the tournament would be as an unused substitute in the final Following the tournament, Weber would fail to make a single appearance until the final matchdays of the following 1966–67 Bundesliga, scoring in the surprise 1–4 victory against Schalke 04 on 29 April 1967. The following 1967–68 season would barely improve for Weber, only appearing sporadically throughout his final season.

The lack of opportunities within Dortmund led to Weber signing for the newly promoted Hertha BSC. Throughout their 1968–69 season, Weber gradually made his way to becoming a member of the club's starting XI. The following 1969–70 season saw Weber fully convert to being a forward and seeing far more activity in his career, playing 28 out of 34 matches and with five goals, contributed to Die Alte Dame achieving a third place finish behind champions Borussia Mönchengladbach and runners-up Bayern Munich. This success was emulated in the following 1970–71 season. However, due to Weber losing his place in the starting XI in 1971, he decided to move to Werder Bremen for their 1971–72 season but the club would finish in a disappointing 11th place during the 1971–72 Bundesliga.

Matters for Weber were made even worse when he was found to be involved in the 1971 Bundesliga scandal when he was still a member of Hertha Berlin and was thus given a suspension from Bundesliga play from 21 June 1972 to 20 June 1974 as well as being forced to pay a fine of 15,000 DM. As a result, alongside many other German footballers that were also convicted such as Volkmar Groß, Arno Steffenhagen, Bernd Patzke and Wolfgang Gayer to play for South African club Hellenic due to the South African Football Association being banned from FIFA at the time due to their apartheid policies at the time with the club being under English player-manager Johnny Byrne. However, he immediately returned to Germany upon his pardon on 26 November 1973 and signed a new contract with Eintracht Braunschweig.

Weber immediately became part of the Starting XI within Braunschweig and played 28 out of 36 in the old second-tier 1973–74 Regionalliga. The club ultimately beat out FC St. Pauli to second place and qualify for the Bundesliga promotional playoffs, beating out Nürnberg and regained promotion to the top-flight of German football. However, despite helping the club achieve promotion, he made just a single appearance in the 2–2 draw against Fortuna Düsseldorf on 28 September 1974 for their 1974–75 season. Due to this, he moved to Hannover 96] for their 1975–76 season but he couldn't prevent the club's relegation from the Bundesliga. He retired following Hannover struggling within the 2. Bundesliga during their 1976–77 season.
