= Ipta =

Ipta or IPTA can refer to:

- Indian People's Theatre Association
- International Pulsar Timing Array
- Werner Ipta, German football player
