= Ferschl =

Ferschl is a German surname. Notable people with the surname include:

- Karl-Heinz Ferschl (1944–2023), German football player
- Susanne Ferschl (born 1973), German politician
