= List of Hertha BSC managers =

This is a list of details of Hertha BSC coaches and their statistics, trophies and other records.

== Tenure, wins, draws, losses and winning percentage ==
As of 10 March 2024

No.	Coach	From	To	Record				
No.	Coach	From	To	G	W	D	L	Win %
1	Jupp Schneider	1 July 1963	9 March 1965	55	16	14	25	29.09
2	Gerhard Schulte	9 March 1965	30 June 1966	38	32	3	3	84.21
3	Helmut Kronsbein	1 July 1966	13 March 1974	223	92	53	78	41.26
4	Hans Eder	17 March 1974	30 June 1974	9	3	1	5	33.33
5	Dettmar Cramer	1 July 1974	9 July 1974	0	0	0	0	—
6	Hans Eder	10 July 1974	16 July 1974	0	0	0	0	—
7	Georg Kessler	17 July 1974	30 June 1977	118	54	26	38	45.76
8	Kuno Klötzer	1 July 1977	28 October 1979	94	38	25	31	40.43
9	Hans Eder	28 October 1979	26 December 1979	7	1	3	3	14.29
10	Helmut Kronsbein	27 December 1979	30 June 1980	19	8	3	8	42.11
11	Uwe Klimaschewski	1 July 1980	30 June 1981	62	41	5	16	66.13
12	Georg Gawliczek	1 July 1981	10 December 1983	59	20	15	24	33.90
13	Martin Luppen	11 December 1983	30 June 1984	43	16	12	15	37.21
14	Uwe Kliemann	1 July 1984	11 November 1985	61	16	23	22	26.23
15	Hans Eder	11 November 1985	12 January 1986	1	0	1	0	0.00
16	Rudi Gutendorf	13 January 1986	18 April 1986	13	2	5	6	15.38
17	Jürgen Sundermann	19 April 1986	8 October 1988	18	4	5	9	22.22
18	Werner Fuchs	13 October 1988	13 November 1990	79	33	22	24	41.77
19	Pál Csernai	14 November 1990	12 March 1991	6	1	3	2	16.67
20	Peter Neururer	13 March 1991	28 May 1991	12	0	2	10	0.00
21	Karsten Heine	28 May 1991	30 June 1991	3	1	0	2	33.33
22	Bernd Stange	1 July 1991	18 August 1992	41	14	12	15	34.15
23	Günter Sebert	21 August 1992	20 October 1990	55	24	19	12	43.64
24	Karsten Heine	20 October 1993	23 October 1993	1	0	0	1	0.00
25	Uwe Reinders	24 October 1993	23 March 1994	11	2	4	5	18.18
26	Karsten Heine	23 March 1994	31 December 1995	70	23	23	24	32.86
27	Jürgen Röber	1 January 1996	6 February 2002	227	112	57	58	49.34
28	Falko Götz	6 February 2002	30 June 2002	13	9	1	3	69.23
29	Huub Stevens	1 July 2002	4 December 2003	64	25	17	22	39.06
30	Andreas Thom	4 December 2003	17 December 2003	3	0	2	1	0.00
31	Hans Meyer	1 January 2004	30 June 2004	17	7	5	5	41.18
32	Falko Götz	1 July 2004	10 April 2007	121	47	40	34	38.84
33	Karsten Heine	10 April 2007	30 June 2007	6	3	0	3	50.00
34	Lucien Favre	1 July 2007	28 September 2009	94	40	20	34	42.55
35	Karsten Heine	29 September 2009	3 October 2009	1	0	0	1	0.00
36	Friedhelm Funkel	3 October 2009	30 June 2010	33	7	10	16	21.21
37	Markus Babbel	1 July 2010	18 December 2011	55	30	13	12	54.55
38	Rainer Widmayer	18 December 2011	21 December 2011	1	1	0	0	100.00
39	Michael Skibbe	22 December 2011	12 February 2012	5	0	0	5	0.00
40	René Tretschok	14 February 2012	19 February 2012	1	0	0	1	0.00
41	Otto Rehhagel	19 February 2012	30 June 2012	14	3	3	8	21.43
42	Jos Luhukay	1 July 2012	5 February 2015	71	34	18	19	47.89
43	Pál Dárdai	5 February 2015	30 June 2019	172	64	44	64	37.21
44	Ante Čović	1 July 2019	27 November 2019	14	4	3	7	28.57
45	Jürgen Klinsmann	27 November 2019	11 February 2020	10	3	3	4	30.00
46	Alexander Nouri	12 February 2020	8 April 2020	4	1	2	1	25.00
47	Bruno Labbadia	9 April 2020	24 January 2021	28	8	6	14	28.57
48	Pál Dárdai	25 January 2021	29 November 2021	32	10	9	13	31.25
49	Tayfun Korkut	29 November 2021	13 March 2022	14	2	3	9	14.29
50	Felix Magath	13 March 2022	23 May 2022	9	3	1	5	33.33
51	Sandro Schwarz	19 June 2022	16 April 2023	28	5	7	16	17.86
52	Pál Dárdai	16 April 2023	present	35	13	9	13	37.14

=== Combined records ===
As of 10 March 2024

No.	Coach	From	To	Record				
No.	Coach	From	To	G	W	D	L	Win %
3	Helmut Kronsbein	1 July 1966	13 March 1974	223	92	53	78	41.26
10	Helmut Kronsbein	27 December 1979	30 June 1980	19	8	3	8	42.11
Total				242	100	56	86	41.32
4	Hans Eder	17 March 1974	30 June 1974	9	3	1	5	33.33
6	Hans Eder	10 July 1974	16 July 1974	0	0	0	0	—
9	Hans Eder	28 October 1979	26 December 1979	7	1	3	3	14.29
15	Hans Eder	11 November 1985	12 January 1986	1	0	1	0	0.00
Total				17	4	5	8	23.53
21	Karsten Heine	28 May 1991	30 June 1991	3	1	0	2	33.33
24	Karsten Heine	20 October 1993	23 October 1993	1	0	0	1	0.00
26	Karsten Heine	23 March 1994	31 December 1995	70	23	23	24	32.86
33	Karsten Heine	10 April 2007	30 June 2007	6	3	0	3	50.00
35	Karsten Heine	29 September 2009	3 October 2009	1	0	0	1	0.00
Total				81	27	23	31	33.33
28	Falko Götz	6 February 2002	30 June 2002	13	9	1	3	69.23
32	Falko Götz	1 July 2004	10 April 2007	121	47	40	34	38.84
Total				134	56	41	37	41.79
43	Pál Dárdai	5 February 2015	30 June 2019	172	64	44	64	37.21
48	Pál Dárdai	25 January 2021	29 November 2021	32	10	9	13	31.25
52	Pál Dárdai	16 April 2023	Present	35	13	9	13	37.14
Total				246	91	64	91	36.99

== Trophies won ==
No.	Coach	Trophies won
2	Gerhard Schulte	1965–66 Regionalliga Berlin
18	Werner Fuchs	1989–90 2. Bundesliga
27	Jürgen Röber	2001 DFB-Ligapokal
29	Huub Stevens	2002 DFB-Ligapokal
37	Markus Babbel	2010–11 2. Bundesliga
42	Jos Luhukay	2012–13 2. Bundesliga
