= Hans-Jürgen Sperlich =

German footballer (born 1948)

Personal information
- Date of birth: 29 February 1948 (age 78)
- Place of birth: Hamm, North Rhine-Westphalia, West Germany
- Position: Centre-forward

Senior career*
Years	Team	Apps	(Gls)
1969–1970	Lüner SV		
1970–1972	Hertha BSC	53	(3)
1972–1974	Durban City		
1974–1977	Hamburger SV	88	(11)
1977–1979	Rot-Weiss Essen	60	(8)
- * Club domestic league appearances and goals

Hans-Jürgen Sperlich (born 28 February 1948) is a retired German footballer. He primarily played for Hertha BSC, Hamburger SV and Rot-Weiss Essen throughout the 1970s as a forward with his greatest achievements occurring with the "Rothosen" throughout the later half of the decade.

== Career ==
Sperlich began his career with Lüner SV that were playing within the Regionalliga that was the second tier of German football at the time. He immediately caught the attention of Hertha BSC who later signed him for their 1970–71 season with his Bundesliga debut occurring in the 65th minute in the second matchday match against Bayern Munich as a substitute for Franz Brungs. His fourth match saw his first goal scored for Die Alte Dame, scoring the winning goal against Schalke on 5 September 1970 as Sperlich went on to become of the top scorers for the club in his debut season. However, his career with Hertha would only last until the following 1971–72 season as Sperlich was found to have participated in the 1971 Bundesliga scandal and was thus given a suspension from the Bundesliga spanning from 21 June 1972 to 20 June 1974 but was later pardoned in November 1973. Despite that, Sperlich chose to play in South Africa for Durban City for two seasons until returning to Germany to play for Hamburger SV for their 1974–75 season. He played for the club for their victory in the 1975–76 DFB-Pokal with the subsequent season seeing him be part of the club's greatest achievement in their victory at the 1976–77 European Cup Winners' Cup. Despite this success, Sperlich was dissatisfied with his status as a substitute as he only made three full appearances in the 1976–77 season. Thus, he played Rot-Weiss Essen for the remainder of his career within the 2. Bundesliga until his retirement following their 1978–79 season.

== Later life ==
Following his footballing career, Sperlich moved to Kassel to train as a masseur and physiotherapist and since 1982, has been working at the Barbara Clinic in Heesse.
