= UD Las Palmas in European football =

Spanish club in European football

- Club: UD Las Palmas
- Seasons played: 3
- First entry: 1969–70 Inter-Cities Fairs Cup
- Latest entry: 1977–78 UEFA Cup

These are the matches that Las Palmas have played in European football competitions. The club's first entry into European football was the 1969–70 Inter-Cities Fairs Cup, with their first official entry in the 1972–73 UEFA Cup.

== UEFA-organised seasonal competitions ==
Las Palmas's score listed first.

=== UEFA Cup ===
Season	Round	Opposition	Home	Away	Aggregate	Reference
1972–73	First Round	(Italy) Torino	4–0	0–2	4–2	
1972–73	Second Round	(Czechoslovakia) Slovan Bratislava	2–2	1–0	3–2	
1972–73	Third Round	(Netherlands) Twente	2–1	0–3	2–4	
1977–78	First Round	(Socialist Federal Republic of Yugoslavia) Sloboda Tuzla	5–0	3–4	8–4	
1977–78	Second Round	(England) Ipswich Town	3–3	0–1	3–4	

== UEFA-non organised seasonal competitions ==
=== Inter-Cities Fairs Cup ===
Season	Round	Opposition	Home	Away	Aggregate
1969–70	First Round	(West Germany) Hertha BSC	0–0	0–1	0–1

== Overall record ==
=== By competition ===
As of 19 October 1977

Competition	Pld	W	D	L	GF	GA	GD	Win%
UEFA Cup	10	4	2	4	20	16	+4	40.00
Fairs Cup	2	0	1	1	0	1	−1	0.00
Total	12	4	3	5	20	17	+3	33.33

Source: UEFA.com
Pld = Matches played; W = Matches won; D = Matches drawn; L = Matches lost; GF = Goals for; GA = Goals against; GD = Goal Difference.

== See also ==
- Football in Spain
- European Club Association
