= Greta Patzke =

Professor of Inorganic Chemistry

Greta R. Patzke (born 2 March 1974 in Bremen) is Professor of Inorganic Chemistry at the University of Zurich.

== Life ==
From 1993 to 1997 she studied chemistry at Leibniz University Hannover. Her diploma thesis dealt with solid-state chemistry and computational chemistry. From 1997 to 1999 she completed her dissertation at Leibniz University in the group of Michael Binnewies. This dissertation dealt with the synthesis, characterization and properties of mixed oxides. In the group of Reinhard Nesper at the ETH Zurich she worked on her habilitation from 1999 on. During this time she worked on inorganic structural chemistry, the synthesis of nanomaterials and the systematic application and investigation of hydrothermal techniques. From 2007 to 2013, Greta Patzke was Assistant Professor of Inorganic Chemistry at the University of Zurich (Swiss National Science Foundation's funded professorship). In spring 2013 she was promoted to Associate Professor. Since May 2016 she is Full Professor. Since 2017 she is part of the institute's Board of Directors.

== Prizes and awards ==
- 2017 Credit Suisse Award for Best Teaching
- 07/1993 Gold medal at the 25th International Chemistry Olympiad in Italy (13th overall place worldwide)

== Selected publications ==
- Patzke, Greta R.; Krumeich, Frank; Nesper, Reinhard (2002). "Oxidic Nanotubes and Nanorods—Anisotropic Modules for a Future Nanotechnology". Angewandte Chemie International Edition. 41 (14): 2446–2461. doi:10.1002/1521-3773(20020715)41:14<2446::AID-ANIE2446>3.0.CO;2-K. ISSN 1521-3773. PMID 12203509.
- Hussain, Firasat; Conrad, Franziska; Patzke, Greta R. (2009-11-16). "A Gadolinium-Bridged Polytungstoarsenate(III) Nanocluster: [Gd 8 As 12 W 124 O 432 (H 2 O) 22 ] 60-". Angewandte Chemie International Edition. 48 (48): 9088–9091. doi:10.1002/anie.200903299. PMID 19862786.
