= Carsten Baumann (footballer, born 1946) =

German footballer

Personal information
- Date of birth: 7 October 1946 (age 80)
- Place of birth: Germany
- Position: Forward

Senior career*
Years	Team	Apps	(Gls)
- Werder Bremen II
1966–1967	Werder Bremen	0	(0)
1967–1971	VfL Osnabrück		
1971–1973	Werder Bremen	21	(3)
1973–1975	Hessen Kassel		
- * Club domestic league appearances and goals

Carsten Baumann (born 7 October 1946) is a German former professional footballer who played as a forward.
