= Gernot Fraydl =

Austrian footballer (born 1939)

Personal information
- Date of birth: 10 December 1939 (age 86)
- Place of birth: Graz, Nazi Germany
- Height: 1.83 m (6 ft 0 in)
- Position: Goalkeeper

Youth career
- –1957: Deutschlandsberger Sportclub

Senior career*
Years	Team	Apps	(Gls)
1957–1961	Grazer AK	51	(0)
1961–1965	Austria Wien	81	(0)
1965–1966	FC Wacker Innsbruck	24	(0)
1966–1967	Schwarz-Weiß Bregenz	17	(0)
1967	Philadelphia Spartans	25	(0)
1968	St. Louis Stars	9	(0)
1968–1970	Hertha BSC	31	(0)
1970–1971	1860 Munich	31	(0)
1971–1972	First Vienna FC	20	(0)

International career
1961–1970	Austria	27	(0)

Managerial career
- 1977–1981: Deutschlandsberger Sportclub
- 1982–1984: Sturm Graz
- 1985–1986: Grazer AK
- 1989: Wolfsberger AC
- * Club domestic league appearances and goals

Gernot Fraydl (born 10 December 1939) is an Austrian retired football player and coach who played as a goalkeeper.
