= Jan Olsson (footballer, born 1944) =

Swedish footballer (1944–2023)

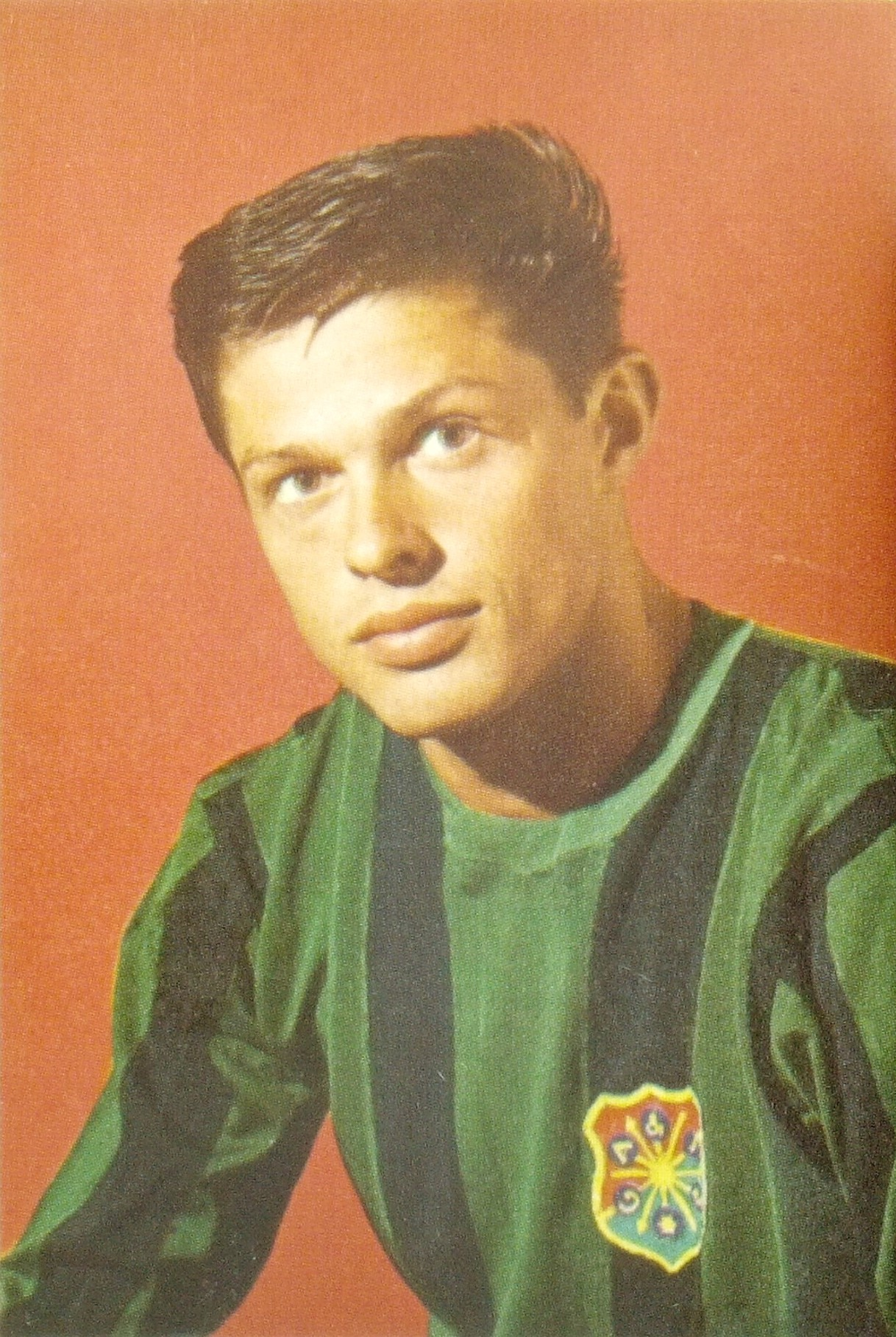
- Olsson in 1968

Personal information
- Full name: Jan Viktor Olsson
- Date of birth: 18 March 1944
- Place of birth: Kungshamn, Sweden
- Date of death: 18 May 2023 (aged 79)
- Height: 1.80 m (5 ft 11 in)
- Position: Midfielder

Senior career*
Years	Team	Apps	(Gls)
1965–1969	GAIS	92	(23)
1969–1971	VfB Stuttgart	64	(20)
1971–1974	GAIS	52	(2)
1975–1977	Örgryte IS	52	(5)
Total		260	(50)

International career
1967–1973	Sweden	22	(1)

Managerial career
- 1994–1995: Eintracht Braunschweig
- * Club domestic league appearances and goals

Jan Viktor Olsson (18 March 1944 – 18 May 2023) was a Swedish professional footballer who played as a midfielder. He represented GAIS, VfB Stuttgart, and Örgryte IS during a club career that spanned between 1965 and 1977. A full international between 1967 and 1973, he won 22 caps and scored one goal for the Sweden national team and played at the 1970 FIFA World Cup. He was awarded Guldbollen as Sweden's best footballer of the year in 1970.

== Club career ==
Olsson played for Gais before he became a professional with VfB Stuttgart in 1969. In 1971, he returned to Gais. He is remembered as a rough midfielder and defender.

== International career ==
In the 1970 FIFA World Cup Olsson played the first two matches against Italy, where he marked the Italian forward Gigi Riva with tenacity and vigor, and Israel. However he did not play the last match against Uruguay. In total he was capped 22 times for the Sweden national team.

== Post-playing career ==
Olsson was the manager of Eintracht Braunschweig from July 1994 until September 1995.

== Death ==
Olsson died on 18 May 2023, at the age of 79.

== Honours ==
Individual

- Stor Grabb: 1969
- Guldbollen: 1970
