= Bernd Laube =

German footballer

Personal information
- Date of birth: 13 November 1950
- Place of birth: Bottrop, Germany
- Date of death: 5 December 2012 (aged 62)
- Position: Forward

Senior career*
Years	Team	Apps	(Gls)
1969–1971	Hertha BSC		
1971–1974	Wormatia Worms		
1974–1975	VfR Heilbronn		
1975–1976	SSV Jahn Regensburg		
1976–1980	SC Herford		

Managerial career
- 1989: Hannover 96
- * Club domestic league appearances and goals

Bernd Laube (13 November 1950 – 5 December 2012) was a German football striker.
