= Rudolf Kröner =

German footballer

Personal information
- Date of birth: 6 January 1942
- Date of death: 16 December 2017 (aged 75)
- Height: 1.80 m (5 ft 11 in)
- Position: Midfielder

Senior career*
Years	Team	Apps	(Gls)
1961–1965	SSV Reutlingen		
1965–1967	Stuttgarter Kickers		
1967–1969	Hertha BSC		
1969–1970	Stuttgarter Kickers		
1970–1973	1. FC Nürnberg		

Managerial career
- 1973–1974: SV Germania Bietigheim
- 1974–1977: Stuttgarter Kickers
- 1977–1978: FV Würzburg 04
- 1979–1982: Hessen Kassel
- 1982–1983: 1. FC Kaiserslautern
- 1983: 1. FC Nürnberg
- 1986–1987: Hessen Kassel
- * Club domestic league appearances and goals

Rudolf Kröner (6 January 1942 – 16 December 2017) was a German football midfielder and later manager.
