= Manfred Weidmann =

German footballer

Personal information
- Date of birth: January 15, 1945 (age 81)
- Height: 1.74 m (5 ft 9 in)
- Positions: Striker; defender; midfielder

Senior career*
Years	Team	Apps	(Gls)
1967–1976	VfB Stuttgart	268	(33)
1976–1979	SpVgg Ludwigsburg		
1979–1980	SV Rot		
- * Club domestic league appearances and goals

Manfred Weidmann (born January 15, 1945) is a German former football player. He spent 8 seasons in the Bundesliga with VfB Stuttgart.
