= Heinz Aldinger =

German football referee (1933–2024)

Heinz Aldinger (7 January 1933 – 18 October 2024) was a German football referee. He was a linesman at the 1974 FIFA World Cup and refereed one match in the 1980 UEFA European Football Championship in Italy.

Aldinger also refereed the 1978 European Cup Winners' Cup final between Anderlecht and Austria Vienna in Paris.

On 18 October 2024, the German Football Association announced that Aldinger had died. He was 91.
