= Peter Enders =

German chess grandmaster (1963–2025)

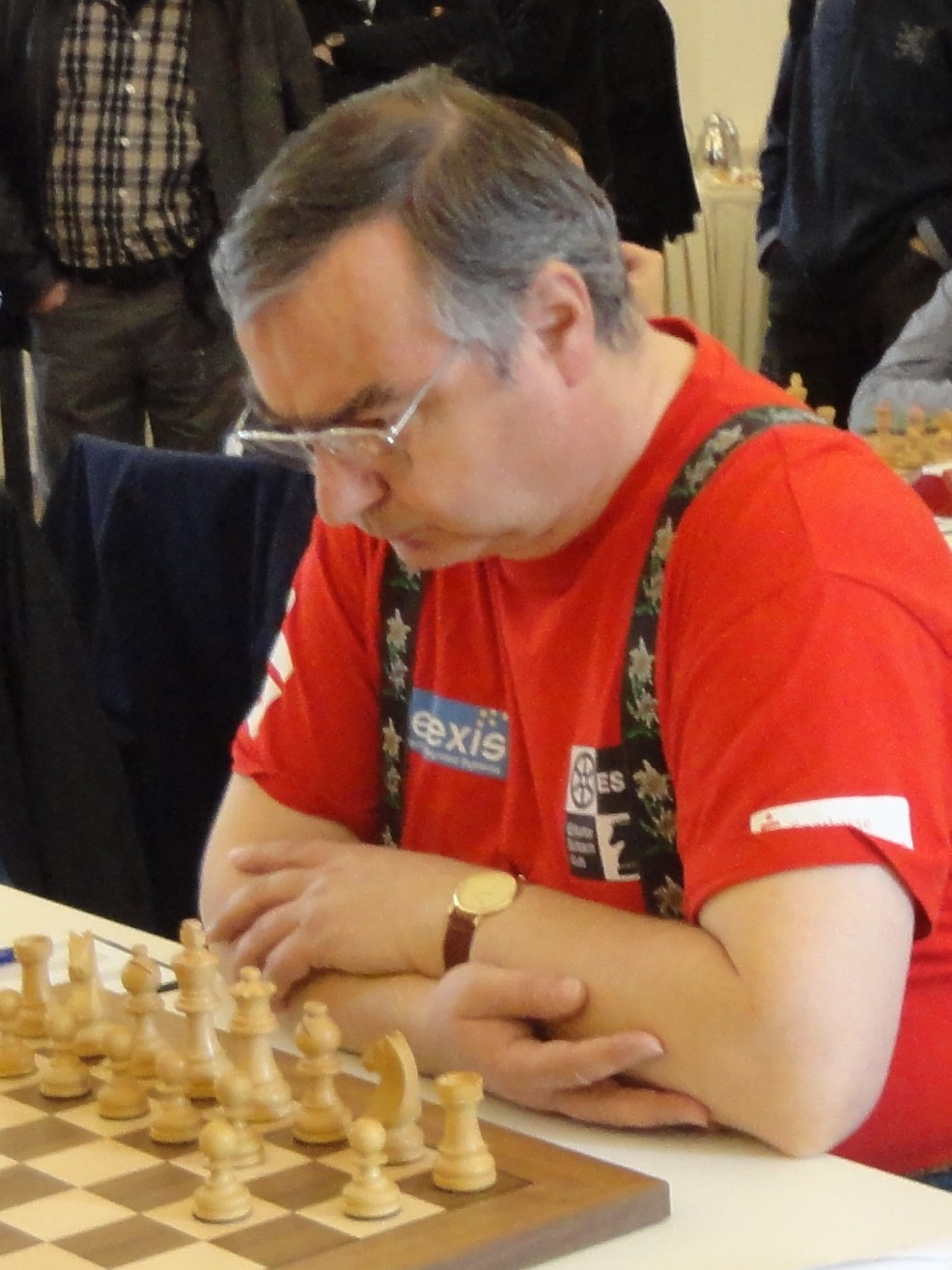
- Enders in 2016

Personal information
- Born: 2 February 1963
- Died: 2 February 2025 (aged 62) Freyburg, Saxony-Anhalt, Germany

Chess career
- Country: Germany
- Title: Grandmaster (1997)
- Peak rating: 2535 (July 1997)

Peter Enders (2 February 1963 – 2 February 2025) was a German chess Grandmaster (GM, 1997) who won the German Chess Championship (1994).

== Biography ==
Peter Enders grew up in East Germany and was considered one of the most talented young players there. During this time he played in numerous chess tournaments in Hungary and also played in the Hungarian chess league. Enders suffered greatly from the disputes with the East Germany chess association. Although he had achieved or far exceeded the required norms for the title International Master (IM), the association did not award the title to the FIDE requested. In 1989 he was not admitted to the East German Chess Championship because of disputes about accommodation there (Enders wanted a single room). Since he was number three in the country at the time, he assumed he was entitled to it. Enders then attempted suicide.

Only after the Peaceful Revolution did he gain a better chess footing in Germany; in 1990 he became German Blitz Chess Champion and in 1993 received the International Master (IM) title. In the same year he won the German Chess Championship, which brought him the qualification for the FIDE World Chess Championship Zonal Tournament in Ptuj and his first chess grandmaster norm. He finally received the title in 1997 after winning the grandmaster chess tournament in Schöneck together with Normunds Miezis at the end of 1996 and thus achieving his third and last norm. In 1996 he also became German champion in rapid chess.

Enders died in Freyburg, Germany on 2 February 2025, his 62nd birthday.

== Clubs ==
After the German reunification, Peter Enders played in Chess Bundesliga from 1990 to 1993 for the Münchener SC 1836, from 1993 to 1995, in the 1998–99 season and from 2002 for the Erfurter Schachklub (until 1995 SV Erfurt West), from 1995 to 1998 for PSV Duisburg and in the 1999–2000 season for SK Passau several seasons in the 1st Chess Bundesliga, most recently in the 2009–10 season. In the Austrian Chess Bundesliga he played for SK Kufstein in the 1998–99 season.
