= Horst Haug =

German footballer

Personal information
- Date of birth: 12 May 1946 (age 80)
- Place of birth: Stuttgart, Germany
- Height: 1.72 m (5 ft 8 in)
- Positions: Midfielder; striker

Senior career*
Years	Team	Apps	(Gls)
1964–1967	Stuttgarter Kickers		
1967–1973	VfB Stuttgart	135	(32)
1973–1979	Stuttgarter Kickers	169	(33)
- * Club domestic league appearances and goals

Horst Haug (born 12 May 1946) is a retired German football player. He spent six seasons in the Bundesliga with VfB Stuttgart. The best league finish he achieved was fifth place.
