= Karl-Heinz Ferschl =

German footballer (1944–2023)

Personal information
- Date of birth: 7 July 1944
- Place of birth: Nuremberg, Gau Franconia, Germany
- Date of death: 30 May 2023 (aged 78)
- Height: 1.74 m (5 ft 9 in)
- Positions: Defender; midfielder

Senior career*
Years	Team	Apps	(Gls)
1962–1968	1. FC Nürnberg	121	(5)
1968–1972	Hertha BSC	120	(1)
Total		241	(6)
- * Club domestic league appearances and goals

Karl-Heinz Ferschl (7 July 1944 – 30 May 2023) was a German footballer who played as a defender, midfielder. He spent nine seasons in the Bundesliga with 1. FC Nürnberg and Hertha BSC.

Ferschl died on 30 May 2023, at the age of 78.

== Honours ==
1. FC Nürnberg

- Bundesliga: 1967–68
