= Hans Eder (footballer) =

German footballer and manager (1934–2022)

- Hans Eder in 1974

Personal information
- Date of birth: 14 November 1934
- Place of birth: Berlin, Brandenburg, Prussia, Germany
- Date of death: 5 September 2022 (aged 87)
- Place of death: Braunschweig, Lower Saxony, Germany
- Position: Defender

Youth career
- 1951–1956: SC Union 06 Berlin

Senior career*
Years	Team	Apps	(Gls)
1956–1962	Tennis Borussia Berlin		
1962–1972	Hertha BSC	57	(0)

Managerial career
- 1974: Hertha BSC
- 1979: Hertha BSC
- 1985: Hertha BSC
- * Club domestic league appearances and goals

Hans Eder (14 November 1934 – 5 September 2022) was a German football player and manager. He played predominantly as a defender for Hertha BSC. He is still remembered as one of the greatest Hertha players.

== Playing career ==
Eder began his career with Union Oberschöneweide. After playing for SC Union 06 Berlin, and Tennis Borussia Berlin, he transferred to Hertha BSC for the then considered high transfer fee of 80,000 DM. He was part of the Hertha team that was relegated in 1965, but also the team that was promoted back to the Bundesliga in 1970–71. In 1971, he briefly acted as assistant manager to Helmut Kronsbein. His greatest success with Hertha was the sixth place finish in the 1971–72 season, after which he retired from professional football.

== Managerial career ==
Only a year after retiring as a player, Eder returned to Hertha assuming the post of manager on 14 March 1974. Because of Hertha's poor standing in the league, he was sacked on 30 June 1974, but returned to the post only ten days later, and stayed on until the end of the season. In 1979, and again in 1985, he briefly acted as manager for Hertha. He continued work as assistant manager for Hertha BSC until his retirement in 1991.
