= Zoltán Varga (footballer, born 1945) =

Hungarian footballer

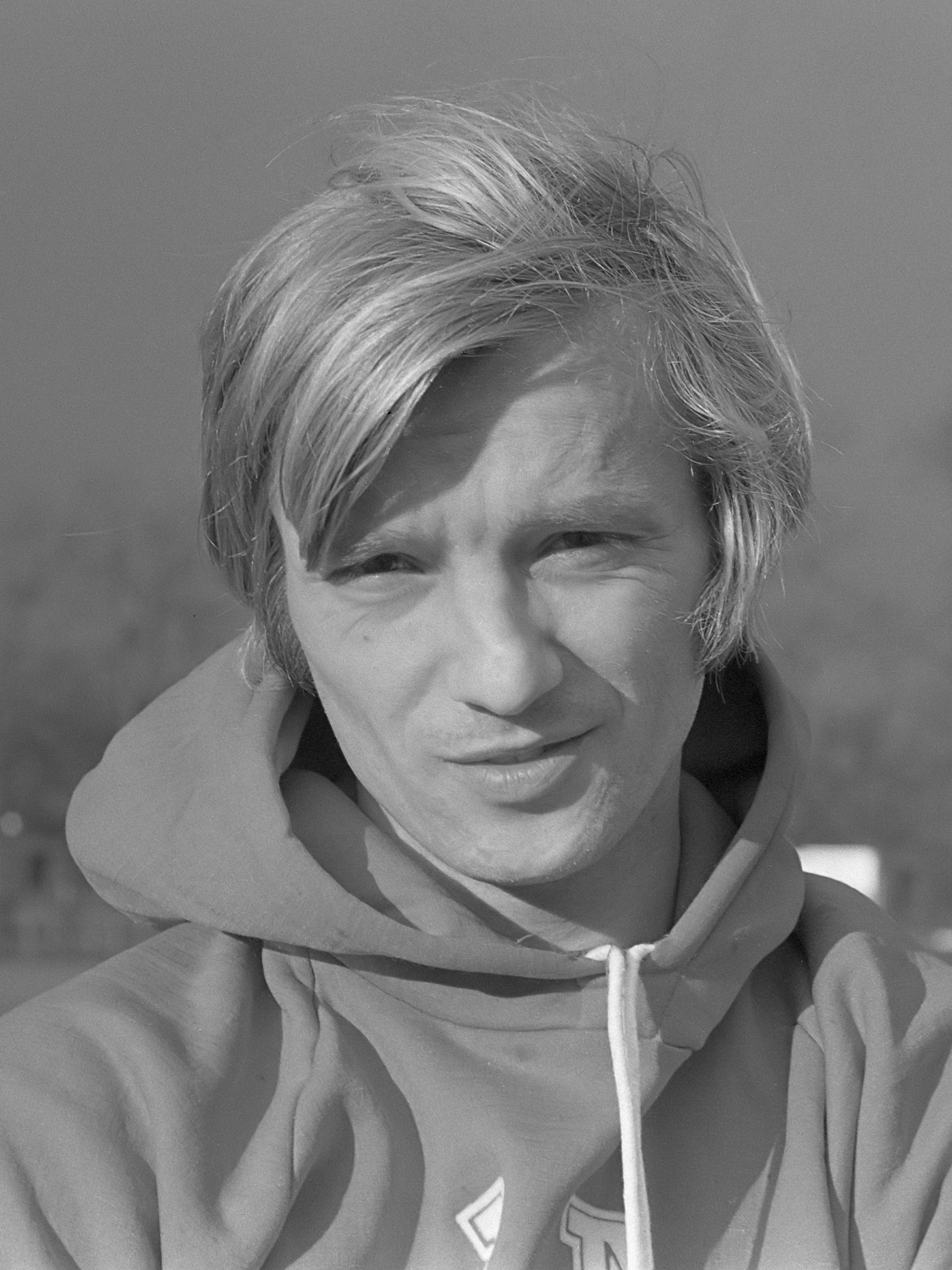
- Varga in 1973

Personal information
- Date of birth: 1 January 1945
- Place of birth: Vál, Hungary
- Date of death: 9 April 2010 (aged 65)
- Place of death: Budapest, Hungary
- Height: 1.76 m (5 ft 9 in)
- Position: Midfielder

Youth career
- 1959–1961: Ferencváros

Senior career*
Years	Team	Apps	(Gls)
1961–1968	Ferencváros	135	(53)
1968–1969	Standard Liège	0	(0)
1969–1972	Hertha BSC	34	(9)
1972–1973	Aberdeen	26	(10)
1973–1974	Ajax	12	(2)
1974–1976	Borussia Dortmund	56	(11)
1976–1977	FC Augsburg	8	(1)
1977–1978	Gent	0	(0)
Total		271	(86)

International career
1964–1968	Hungary	12	(2)

Managerial career
- 1981: Preußen Münster
- 1996–1997: Ferencváros
- 1997: Budapest Honvéd
- 2000: Diósgyőr
- 2001: Győr
- 2003: Győr
Medal record
Men's football
Representing Hungary
Olympic Games
Gold medal – first place	1964 Tokyo	Team competition
- * Club domestic league appearances and goals

Zoltán Varga (1 January 1945 – 9 April 2010) was a Hungarian footballer who played in the 1960s and 1970s. He was an Olympic gold medalist at the 1964 Summer Olympics in Tokyo. He played for Ferencvárosi TC when they won the Inter-Cities Fairs Cup in 1965, beating Juventus 1–0 in the final. He also played for Ajax Amsterdam.

He played in Germany for Borussia Dortmund and Hertha BSC, but was banned after he was caught taking bribes to lose matches.

During the period of his ban he played for Aberdeen F.C. in Scotland.

== Club career ==
=== Career in Hungary ===
Varga began his professional csreer with Ferencváros. He played for them between 1961 and 1968, one of the most successful post-World War II periods in the club's history. Varga made 135 career appearances, scoring 53 goals. The club became champion in 1962 and '63, 1964, 1967 and 1968 NB I-season as well.

In these years, Fradi, as one of Europe's best club teams, qualified for the Inter-Cities Fairs Cup series, also called the International Festival of the major European Football Confederation tournament. Today's successor to the European leagues.

In 1962–63 seasons in the semi-finals in a row Varga, and two years later, 1964–65 they won it. Success is not interrupted in 1967, 68 in the runner. Since the Mexican Olympic Games, Varga left the country, so successfully ended the era of Ferencváros.

=== Career in Europe ===
Between 1969 and 1972, Varga scored nine in 34 games for the German side Hertha BSC; played 26 games for Aberdeen in Scotland, where he is still considered by many to be the finest foreign import ever to play for the club; scored two goals in 12 games for the Dutch side Ajax; eleven in 56 games for the German side Borussia Dortmund; and finally, also in Germany, one in 8 games for FC Augsburg.

== International career ==
Between 1964 and 1968 he had been included in the Hungarian national team 12 times and scored 2 goals. In 1964, Spain's European Championship team bronze medal for the author made his debut as a member of the team. In 1966 he participated in the World Cup in England, but could not play due to an earlier injury.

He received a gold medal as member of Hungary's Olympic Team in the Tokyo Olympic Games, in 1964. During the 1968 Olympics in Mexico City he had left the Hungarian Team Camp before the matches and did not return to Hungary.

== Death ==
On 9 April 2010, Varga was playing in an old-boys football match at Danuvia when he was taken ill. He collapsed and, despite efforts by teammates and emergency responders to resusciate him, died at the age of 65.

== Career statistics ==
=== Appearances and goals by club, season and competition ===
Club	Season	League			National Cup		League Cup		Europe		Other		Total	
Club	Season	Division	Apps	Goals	Apps	Goals	Apps	Goals	Apps	Goals	Apps	Goals	Apps	Goals
Ferencvárosi	1961-62	Nemzeti Bajnokság I	2	0	-	-	-	-	-	-	-	-	2+	0+
Ferencvárosi	1962-63	Nemzeti Bajnokság I	11	4	-	-	-	-	-	-	-	-	11+	4+
Ferencvárosi	1963	Nemzeti Bajnokság I	4	0	-	-	-	-	-	-	-	-	4+	0+
Ferencvárosi	1964	Nemzeti Bajnokság I	25	7	-	-	-	-	-	-	-	-	25+	7+
Ferencvárosi	1965	Nemzeti Bajnokság I	22	6	-	-	-	-	-	-	-	-	22+	6+
Ferencvárosi	1966	Nemzeti Bajnokság I	21	9	-	-	-	-	-	-	-	-	21+	9+
Ferencvárosi	1967	Nemzeti Bajnokság I	30	15	-	-	-	-	-	-	-	-	30+	15+
Ferencvárosi	1968	Nemzeti Bajnokság I	20	12	-	-	-	-	-	-	-	-	20+	12+
Ferencvárosi	Total		135	53	-	-	-	-	-	-	-	-	135+	53+
Hertha BSC	1969-70	Bundesliga	0	0	0	0	-	-	0	0	-	-	0	0
Hertha BSC	1970-71	Bundesliga	22	5	1	0	-	-	1	0	-	-	24	5
Hertha BSC	1971-72	Bundesliga	12	4	0	0	-	-	4	1	-	-	16	5
Hertha BSC	Total		34	9	1	0	-	-	5	1	-	-	40	10
Aberdeen	1972-73	Scottish Division One	26	10	3	0	2	0	0	0	-	-	31	10
Aberdeen	Total		26	10	3	0	2	0	0	0	-	-	31	10
Ajax	1973-74	Eredivisie	12	2	1	0	0	0	0	0	-	-	13	2
Ajax	1974-75	Eredivisie	0	0	0	0	0	0	0	0	-	-	0	0
Ajax	Total		12	2	1	0	0	0	0	0	-	-	13	2
Borussia Dortmund	1974-75	2. Bundesliga	30	5	5	1	-	-	-	-	-	-	35	6
Borussia Dortmund	1975-76	2. Bundesliga	26	6	2	0	-	-	-	-	1	0	29	6
Borussia Dortmund	Total		56	11	7	1	-	-	-	-	1	0	64	12
FC Augsburg	1976-77	Süd	8	1	2	0	-	-	-	-	-	-	10	1
FC Augsburg	Total		8	1	2	0	-	-	-	-	-	-	10	1
Career total			271	86	14	1+	2+	0+	5+	0+	1	0	293+	88+
