= Werner Ipta =

German footballer (1942–2019)

Personal information
- Full name: Werner Ipta
- Date of birth: 18 March 1942
- Place of birth: Wattenscheid, Germany
- Date of death: 22 February 2019 (aged 76)
- Height: 1.72 m (5 ft 8 in)
- Positions: Forward; midfielder

Youth career
- –1960: FC Schalke 04

Senior career*
Years	Team	Apps	(Gls)
1960–1963	FC Schalke 04	49	(16)
1963–1964	Bayern Munich	28	(7)
1964–1966	Grasshoppers Zurich		
1966–1970	Hertha BSC	38	(6)
1970–1972	Tasmania 1900 Berlin		
- * Club domestic league appearances and goals

Werner Ipta (18 March 1942 – 22 February 2019) was a football player who was active in the Bundesliga in Germany from 1968 to 1970.

== Career ==
His debut was on Christmas Day in 1960 with FC Schalke 04, where he contributed to the 3–1 win against SF Hamborn 07. He continued to play the rest of the year and had a total of three seasons with the Royal Blues. During these years, Schalke placed third, second and sixth. He scored a total of 16 goals and achieved 49 caps for Schalke. He then played for Bayern Munich in the Regionalliga Süd for one year, contributing to their second-place finish. He then moved to the Grasshoppers Zurich. After two years in Switzerland he came back to Germany to spend his remaining career in Berlin. He spent four years with Hertha BSC's first XI and played then for two years for Tasmania 1900 Berlin in the Stadtliga Berlin (City League Berlin).
