= Franz Brungs =

German footballer

Personal information
- Date of birth: 4 December 1936 (age 89)
- Place of birth: Bad Honnef, Germany
- Height: 1.73 m (5 ft 8 in)
- Position: Striker

Senior career*
Years	Team	Apps	(Gls)
1954–1958	FV Bad Honnef		
1958–1960	1. FC Köln	24	(5)
1960–1963	Borussia Mönchengladbach	88	(36)
1963–1965	Borussia Dortmund	54	(23)
1965–1968	1. FC Nürnberg	97	(50)
1968–1971	Hertha BSC	84	(24)
1971–1972	1. FC Nürnberg	26	(6)

Managerial career
- 1974–1975: FC Stein
- 1975–1978: SpVgg Büchenbach
- 1978–1980: FC Herzogenaurach
- 1980–1982: Kickers Offenbach
- 1982–1983: SpVgg Fürth
- 1983–1984: VfB Coburg
- 1984–1985: SpVgg Bayreuth
- 1985–1986: VfL Frohnlach
- 1986–1987: Kickers Offenbach
- 1987–1989: KSV Hessen Kassel
- 1990–1991: MTV Ingolstadt
- 1991: 1. FC Schweinfurt 05
- 1993–1995: KSV Hessen Kassel
- * Club domestic league appearances and goals

Franz Brungs (born 4 December 1936) is a German retired football coach and player. As a player, he spent eight seasons in the Bundesliga with Borussia Dortmund, 1. FC Nürnberg and Hertha BSC.

== Honours ==
- Bundesliga: 1967–68
- DFB-Pokal: 1959–60, 1964–65; runner-up 1962–63
