= Lorenz Horr =

German footballer (1942–2023)

Personal information
- Date of birth: 27 September 1942
- Place of birth: Oggersheim, Germany
- Date of death: 18 August 2023 (aged 80)
- Place of death: Enkenbach-Alsenborn, Rhineland-Palatinate, Germany
- Height: 1.78 m (5 ft 10 in)
- Position: Forward

Senior career*
Years	Team	Apps	(Gls)
–1969	SV Alsenborn		
1969–1977	Hertha BSC	240	(75)
1977–1978	Wormatia Worms	37	(5)
1978–1979	Waldhof Mannheim	10	(3)
Total		287+	(83+)
- * Club domestic league appearances and goals

Lorenz Horr (27 September 1942 – 18 August 2023) was a German professional footballer who played as a forward. He played in the Bundesliga with Hertha BSC and also played for SV Alsenborn, Wormatia Worms and Waldhof Mannheim. His DM 336,000 transfer from SV Alsenborn to Hertha BSC was the then record transfer fee in German football.

Horr died on 18 August 2023, at the age of 80.
