= Volkmar Groß =

German footballer (1948–2014)

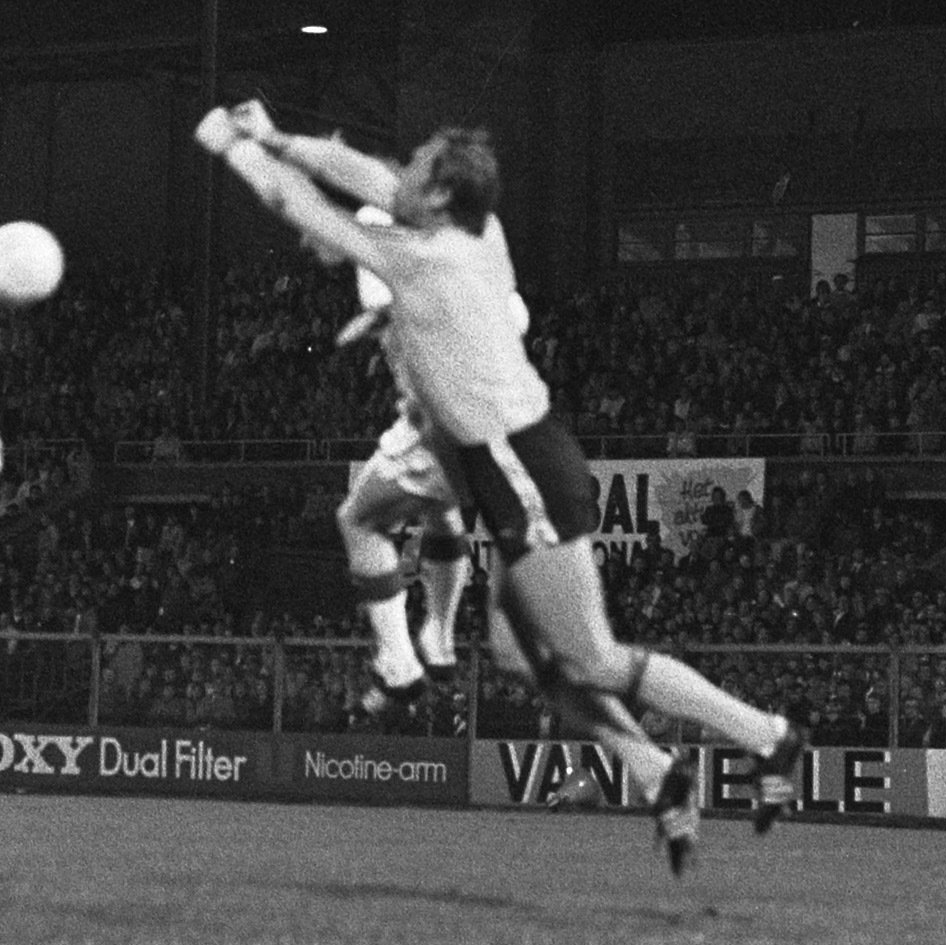
- Groß with FC Twente in 1974

Personal information
- Date of birth: 31 January 1948
- Place of birth: Berlin, Germany
- Date of death: 3 July 2014 (aged 66)
- Height: 1.93 m (6 ft 4 in)
- Position: Goalkeeper

Senior career*
Years	Team	Apps	(Gls)
1967–1972	Hertha BSC	101	(0)
1972–1974	Hellenic FC		
1974–1976	FC Twente	65	(0)
1977	Tennis Borussia Berlin	17	(1)
1977–1979	Schalke 04	35	(0)
1979	Minnesota Kicks	15	(0)
1979–1983	San Diego Sockers	125	(0)

International career
1970	West Germany	1	(0)
- * Club domestic league appearances and goals

Volkmar Groß (31 January 1948 – 3 July 2014) was a German professional footballer who played as a goalkeeper. He spent seven seasons in the Bundesliga with Hertha BSC, Tennis Borussia Berlin and FC Schalke 04. He represented West Germany once in a friendly against Greece. He scored one goal in the Bundesliga from a penalty kick.

== Career ==
Groß was born in Berlin. In 1967, he began his career with Hertha BSC. In 1971, Groß received a 15,000 Deutsche Mark fine as a result of an investigation into a match fixing scheme. He was suspended for two years from the Bundesliga and banned for life from the national team. During those two years, he played for Hellenic FC in South Africa as due to UN Sanctions against this country, South Africa was not a member of FIFA. In 1977, he returned to Germany and joined Tennis Borussia Berlin.

In 1979, Groß moved to the United States and signed with the Minnesota Kicks of the North American Soccer League. He began the season in Minnesota, but finished it with the San Diego Sockers. He would go on to play five outdoor, two NASL indoor and one Major Indoor Soccer League seasons with the Sockers before retiring in 1984.

Groß died on 3 July 2014 after a long illness.

== Honours ==
- UEFA Cup finalist: 1974–75

== See also ==
- Bundesliga scandal (1971)
