= Bernd Patzke =

German footballer

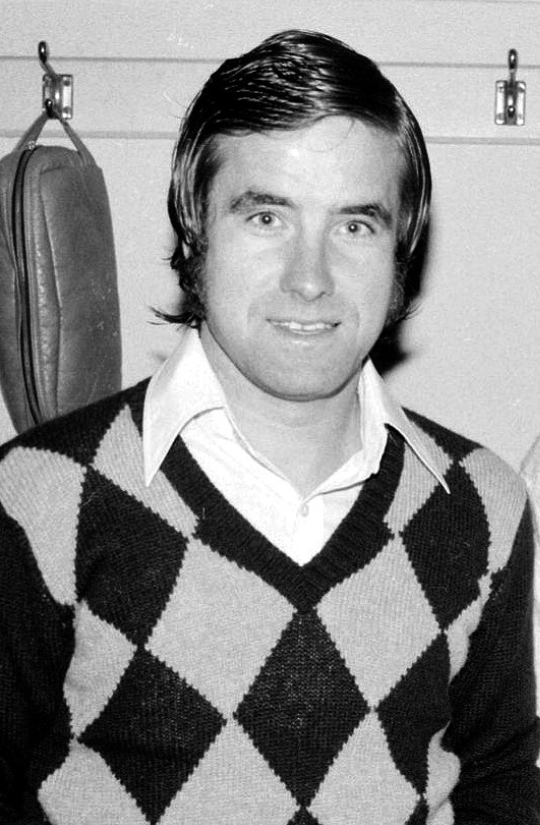
- Patzke in 1972

Personal information
- Date of birth: 14 March 1943 (age 83)
- Place of birth: Berlin, Germany
- Height: 1.76 m (5 ft 9 in)
- Position: Defender

Youth career
- 1961–1962: Minerva 93 Berlin

Senior career*
Years	Team	Apps	(Gls)
1962–1964	Standard Liège	54	(2)
1964–1969	1860 Munich	136	(2)
1969–1971	Hertha BSC	66	(4)
- Durban City
1972–1973	Hellenic F.C.		
1974	1860 Munich		

International career
1965–1971	West Germany	24	(0)

Managerial career
- 1974–1975: ESV Ingolstadt
- 1977–1978: FK Pirmasens
- 1983–1984: 1860 Munich
- 1990: Oman
- 1993: Tennis Borussia Berlin
Medal record
Men's football
Representing West Germany
FIFA World Cup
Runner-up	1966 England
Third place	1970 Mexico
- * Club domestic league appearances and goals

Bernd Patzke (born 14 March 1943) is a German former football player and manager.

The defender was twice a squad member of the West Germany national team for FIFA World Cup tournaments: 1966 in England and 1970 in Mexico. Altogether he won 24 caps between 1965 and 1971.

Patzke was implicated in the 1971 Bundesliga scandal after which he played in the National Football League (South Africa).

== Honours ==
1860 Munich

- Bundesliga: 1965–66
