= Tasso Wild =

German footballer

Personal information
- Full name: Tasso Wild
- Date of birth: 1 December 1940 (age 85)
- Place of birth: Germany
- Height: 1.82 m (6 ft 0 in)
- Position: Midfielder

Senior career*
Years	Team	Apps	(Gls)
1959–1967	1. FC Nürnberg	153	(55)
1967–1971	Hertha BSC	110	(16)
Total		263	(71)
- * Club domestic league appearances and goals

Tasso Wild (born 1 December 1940) is a German former footballer who played as a midfielder for 1. FC Nürnberg and Hertha BSC.

== Career ==
Wild started his career with 1. FC Nürnberg. Between 1959 and 1963, he made 74 appearances for in the Oberliga Süd, scoring 37 goals, and won the German football championship with the club in 1961. He also scored the winning goal for Nürnberg in the final of the 1961–62 DFB-Pokal against Fortuna Düsseldorf. He made a further 79 appearances for the club in the Bundesliga between 1963 and 1967, scoring 18 goals.

Wild was signed by Hertha BSC in 1967. He appeared 88 times for the club in the Bundesliga, scoring seven goals. In 1971, Wild was banned by the DFB from playing in German football for his involvement in the 1971 Bundesliga scandal. Although the ban was later lifted, Wild did not return to professional football.

After retiring, Wild served briefly as vice-chairman at 1. FC Nürnberg.

== Honours ==
- German football championship: 1961
- DFB-Pokal: 1962
