= Wolfgang Gayer =

German footballer (born 1943)

Personal information
- Date of birth: 9 January 1943 (age 83)
- Place of birth: Germany
- Position: Midfielder

Senior career*
Years	Team	Apps	(Gls)
–1963	SC Neckarstadt		
1963–1966	Wiener Sport-Club		
1966–1968	Borussia Neunkirchen	34+	(12+)
1968–1969	Wiener Sport-Club		
1969–1972	Hertha BSC	98	(30)
1972	Durban City F.C.		
1972	Hellenic		
1973–1974	1860 Munich	16+	(3+)
1974–1980	LASK	158	(11)
- * Club domestic league appearances and goals

Wolfgang Gayer (born 9 January 1943) is a German former professional footballer who as a midfielder.

== Career ==
Gayer started his senior career with SC Neckarstadt. In 1969, he signed for Hertha BSC in the German Bundesliga, where he made one-hundred and six appearances and scored thirty-two goals. After that, he played for Durban City, Hellenic, TSV 1860 Munich, and LASK.
