= Arno Steffenhagen =

German footballer

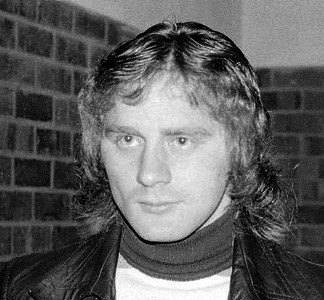
- Steffenhagen in 1972

Personal information
- Date of birth: 24 September 1949 (age 77)
- Place of birth: West Berlin
- Height: 1.69 m (5 ft 7 in)
- Position: Striker

Senior career*
Years	Team	Apps	(Gls)
1968–1972	Hertha BSC	132	(26)
1972–1973	Hellenic FC		
1973–1976	Ajax	58	(19)
1976–1978	Hamburger SV	51	(13)
1978	FC St. Pauli	8	(4)
1978–1982	Chicago Sting	97	(58)
1980–1981	Chicago Sting (indoor)	1	(1)
1983	Toronto Blizzard	14	(0)
1983	Vancouver Whitecaps	8	(2)
1985–1986	Chicago Shoccers (indoor)	1	(0)
Total		371	(123)

International career
1971	West Germany	1	(0)
- * Club domestic league appearances and goals

Arno Steffenhagen (born 24 September 1949) is a German retired professional footballer who played as a striker for clubs in Germany, South Africa, the Netherlands, the United States, and Canada, making nearly 400 career league appearances and scoring over 100 career league goals.

== Career ==
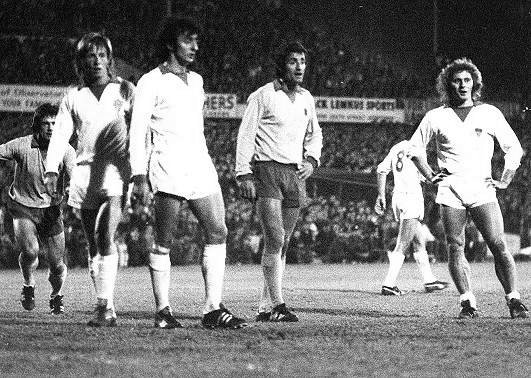
Steffenhagen (right) playing for Hellenic FC against Cape Town City at Hartleyvale, in the early 1970s. Also in the photo Frank McLintock (CTC) (centre) and Wilf Du Bruin (Hellenic), to his right.

Born in West Berlin, Steffenhagen played in West Germany, South Africa, the Netherlands, the United States, and Canada for Hertha BSC, Hellenic FC, Ajax, Hamburger SV, FC St. Pauli, Chicago Sting, Toronto Blizzard, Vancouver Whitecaps and Chicago Shoccers. He also won one cap for the Germany national team in 1971.
