= List of FC Schalke 04 records and statistics =

Below are lists of records of the German football club FC Schalke 04.

Member of the Schalke 04 Hall of Fame ("Ehrenkabine")

== Player records ==
- First / Last: year of the first / last competitive appearance for Schalke
- Seasons (S): number of seasons in which the player made at least one competitive appearance for Schalke
- Position (Pos): GK = Goalkeeper, DF = Defender, MF = Midfielder, FW = Forward

=== Bundesliga era ===
Statistics include all competitive matches since the formation of the Bundesliga in August 1963. Players who are still active for Schalke 04 are shown in bold.

- BL = Bundesliga (1963–1981, 1982–83, 1984–1988, 1991–2021, 2022–23, 2026–current)
- 2.BL = 2. Bundesliga (1981–82, 1983–84, 1988–1991, 2021–22, 2023–2026)
- Cup = DFB-Pokal (1963–)
- EC = European competitions: Champions League (2001–2019), UEFA Cup / Europa League (1976–2017), Cup Winners' Cup (1969–1973)
- OtC = Other competitions: Supercup (2010, 2011), Ligapokal (1972–73, 1998–2007), UI Cup (2003, 2004), Bundesliga relegation play-offs (1983)

Statistics correct as of 22 November 2026.

==== Most appearances ====
Players are sorted by number of total appearances, then by number of Bundesliga appearances.

Player	Nat	First	Last	S	Pos	BL	2.BL	Cup	EC	OtC	Total
Klaus Fichtel	(Germany)	1965	1988	19	DF	**477**	–	**52**	20	7	556
Norbert Nigbur	(Germany)	1966	1982	14	GK	355	38	41	12	9	455
Olaf Thon	(Germany)	1983	2002	13	DF	295	38	29	22	–	384
Gerald Asamoah	(Germany)	1999	2013	12	FW	279	–	30	51	21	381
Rolf Rüssmann	(Germany)	1969	1980	12	DF	304	–	42	19	10	375
Ingo Anderbrügge	(Germany)	1988	1999	12	MF	216	100	22	16	1	355
Herbert Lütkebohmert	(Germany)	1968	1979	11	MF	286	–	39	19	7	351
Klaus Fischer	(Germany)	1970	1981	12	FW	295	–	39	9	6	349
Benedikt Höwedes	(Germany)	2007	2017	10	DF	240	–	27	**66**	2	335
Andreas Müller	(Germany)	1988	2000	12	MF	200	86	19	18	–	323
Jens Lehmann	(Germany)	1988	1998	10	GK	200	74	19	19	–	312
Jiří Němec	(Czech Republic)	1993	2002	9	MF	256	–	24	25	2	307
Mike Büskens	(Germany)	1992	2002	11	MF	257	–	21	23	1	302
Ralf Fährmann	(Germany)	2008	2024	12	GK	212	15	21	40	1	289
Thomas Kruse	(Germany)	1978	1988	10	DF	199	63	22	–	1	285
Ebbe Sand	(Denmark)	1999	2006	7	FW	214	–	25	31	12	282
Helmut Kremers	(Germany)	1971	1980	9	MF	226	–	27	15	6	274
Yves Eigenrauch	(Germany)	1990	2001	11	DF	229	7	20	12	1	269
Erwin Kremers	(Germany)	1971	1978	8	FW	212	–	27	15	6	260
Joël Matip	(Cameroon)	2009	2016	7	DF	194	–	16	46	2	258
Mathias Schipper	(Germany)	1976	1988	10	DF	189	32	31	4	2	258
Klaas-Jan Huntelaar	(Netherlands)	2010	2021	8	FW	184	–	15	49	1	249
Michael Opitz	(Germany)	1980	1988	9	MF	158	66	20	–	2	246
Jürgen Sobieray	(Germany)	1969	1979	9	DF	210	–	21	8	–	239
Michael Prus	(Germany)	1986	1996	11	DF	120	100	19	–	–	239
Rüdiger Abramczik	(Germany)	1973	1987	8	FW	202	–	23	10	–	235
Ulrich Bittcher	(Germany)	1976	1983	8	MF	168	38	22	4	2	234
Levan Kobiashvili	(Georgia (country))	2003	2009	7	MF	168	–	13	35	17	233
Marcelo Bordon	(Brazil)	2004	2010	6	DF	168	–	19	36	8	231
Hans-Jürgen Becher	(Germany)	1963	1971	8	DF	201	–	22	6	–	229
Jefferson Farfán	(Peru)	2008	2015	7	FW	170	–	17	40	1	228
Reinhard Libuda	(Germany)	1963	1974	8	FW	190	–	28	7	–	225
Radoslav Látal	(Czech Republic)	1994	2001	7	MF	187	–	17	20	1	225
Bernd Thiele	(Germany)	1973	1982	9	DF	162	27	17	9	–	215
Kevin Kurányi	(Germany)	2005	2010	5	FW	162	–	14	29	4	209
Thomas Linke	(Germany)	1992	1998	6	DF	175	–	12	18	–	205
Jürgen Luginger	(Germany)	1988	1994	6	MF	83	**108**	13	–	–	204
Klaus Scheer	(Germany)	1969	1975	6	MF	165	–	23	9	6	203
Manuel Neuer	(Germany)	2006	2011	5	GK	156	–	16	27	4	203
Youri Mulder	(Netherlands)	1993	2002	9	FW	177	–	13	12	–	202
Rafinha	(Brazil)	2005	2010	5	DF	153	–	13	31	1	198
Frank Rost	(Germany)	2002	2006	5	GK	130	–	14	34	18	196
Friedel Rausch	(Germany)	1963	1971	8	DF	170	–	20	4	–	194
Marco van Hoogdalem	(Netherlands)	1997	2003	7	DF	151	–	18	20	4	193
Max Meyer	(Germany)	2013	2018	6	MF	146	–	12	34	–	192
Jermaine Jones	(United States)	2007	2013	6	MF	129	–	17	37	2	185
Tomasz Wałdoch	(Poland)	1999	2006	7	DF	141	–	18	14	11	184
Mladen Krstajić	(Serbia)	2004	2009	5	DF	131	–	13	28	11	183
Marc Wilmots	(Belgium)	1996	2003	6	MF	138	–	14	26	–	178
Niels Oude Kamphuis	(Netherlands)	1999	2005	6	MF	134	–	16	16	7	173
Julian Draxler	(Germany)	2011	2015	6	MF	119	–	12	38	1	170
Walter Junghans	(Germany)	1982	1987	5	GK	110	38	18	–	2	168
Nico Van Kerckhoven	(Belgium)	1998	2004	6	DF	134	–	16	9	5	164
Gerhard Neuser	(Germany)	1965	1970	5	MF	143	–	12	7	–	162
Christian Poulsen	(Denmark)	2002	2006	4	MF	111	–	12	29	10	162
Roman Neustädter	(Germany)	2012	2016	4	MF	122	–	7	32	–	161
Hamit Altıntop	(Turkey)	2003	2007	4	MF	113	–	10	21	16	160
Bernard Dietz	(Germany)	1982	1986	5	DF	101	34	21	–	2	158
Matija Nastasić	(Serbia)	2015	2021	7	DF	122	–	17	18	–	157
Hannes Bongartz	(Germany)	1974	1978	4	MF	131	–	17	8	–	156
Peter Sendscheid	(Germany)	1989	1994	6	FW	80	69	6	–	–	155
Heinz van Haaren	(Netherlands)	1968	1972	4	MF	126	–	20	8	–	154
Atsuto Uchida	(Japan)	2010	2016	6	DF	104	–	8	40	1	153
Michael Jakobs	(Germany)	1983	1988	5	DF	97	37	15	–	–	149
Leon Goretzka	(Germany)	2013	2018	5	MF	116	–	9	22	–	147
Fabian Ernst	(Germany)	2005	2009	4	MF	106	–	7	28	5	146
Manfred Drexler	(Germany)	1979	1984	5	MF	67	62	13	–	2	144
Alessandro Schöpf	(Austria)	2016	2021	6	MF	112	–	15	16	–	143
Hartmut Huhse	(Germany)	1971	1975	4	DF	113	–	15	6	8	142
Darío Rodríguez	(Uruguay)	2002	2007	6	DF	102	–	9	24	7	142
Sead Kolašinac	(Bosnia and Herzegovina)	2012	2021	6	DF	111	–	7	23	–	141
Tomasz Hajto	(Poland)	2000	2004	4	DF	104	–	13	16	8	141
Bernd Dierßen	(Germany)	1983	1987	4	MF	87	37	15	–	–	139
Sven Vermant	(Belgium)	2001	2005	4	MF	98	–	12	15	13	138
Klaus Täuber	(Germany)	1983	1987	4	FW	88	37	13	–	–	138
Christian Fuchs	(Austria)	2011	2015	4	MF	99	–	7	29	1	136
Ivan Rakitić	(Croatia)	2007	2011	4	MF	97	–	15	19	4	135
Martin Max	(Germany)	1995	1999	4	FW	109	–	5	18	1	133
Benjamin Stambouli	(France)	2016	2021	5	DF	105	–	12	16	–	133
Oliver Reck	(Germany)	1998	2002	5	GK	112	–	13	6	1	132
Jörg Böhme	(Germany)	2000	2004	5	MF	101	–	12	10	8	131
Daniel Caligiuri	(Germany)	2017	2020	4	MF	108	–	11	11	–	130
Aleksandr Borodyuk	(Russia)	1989	1993	5	FW	63	61	6	–	–	130
Halil Altıntop	(Turkey)	2006	2009	4	FW	96	–	11	17	5	129
Marco Höger	(Germany)	2011	2016	5	MF	88	–	8	30	1	127
**Kenan Karaman**	(Turkey)	2022	2026	4	FW	29	90	8	–	–	127
Bastian Oczipka	(Germany)	2017	2021	4	DF	111	–	13	2	–	126
Manfred Pohlschmidt	(Germany)	1967	1971	4	FW	106	–	12	7	–	125
Günter Güttler	(Germany)	1990	1994	4	DF	85	34	6	–	–	125
Heiko Westermann	(Germany)	2007	2010	3	DF	92	–	11	18	2	123
Hans-Jürgen Wittkamp	(Germany)	1967	1971	4	MF	101	–	15	6	–	122
Günther Herrmann	(Germany)	1963	1967	4	MF	110	–	9	–	–	119
Amine Harit	(Morocco)	2017	2021	4	MF	102	–	12	5	–	119
Guido Burgstaller	(Austria)	2017	2020	4	FW	95	–	13	11	–	119
Gustavo Varela	(Uruguay)	2002	2008	6	MF	82	–	9	19	8	118
Günter Schlipper	(Germany)	1989	1992	5	MF	33	78	7	–	–	118
Lincoln	(Brazil)	2004	2007	3	MF	83	–	9	19	6	117
Klaus Senger	(Germany)	1966	1971	6	DF	102	–	8	3	–	113
Andreas Möller	(Germany)	2000	2003	3	MF	86	–	14	8	4	112
Oliver Held	(Germany)	1995	2001	6	MF	96	–	6	8	–	110

==== Top goalscorers ====
Numbers in brackets indicate appearances made. Players are sorted by number of total goals, then by goals per game (Ø).

Player	Nat	First	Last	Pos	BL	2.BL	Cup	EC	OtC	Total	Ø
Klaus Fischer	(Germany)	1970	1981	FW	**182** (295)	–	**34** (39)	7 (9)	3 (6)	**226** (349)	0.65
Klaas-Jan Huntelaar	(Netherlands)	2010	2021	FW	84 (184)	–	13 (15)	**31** (49)	0 (1)	**128** (249)	0.51
Ebbe Sand	(Denmark)	1999	2006	FW	73 (214)	–	18 (25)	10 (31)	3 (12)	**104** (282)	0.37
Ingo Anderbrügge	(Germany)	1988	1999	MF	46 (216)	36 (100)	5 (22)	1 (16)	0 (1)	**88** (355)	0.25
Kevin Kurányi	(Germany)	2005	2010	FW	71 (162)	–	8 (14)	7 (29)	1 (4)	**87** (209)	0.42
Olaf Thon	(Germany)	1983	2002	DF	52 (295)	14 (38)	8 (29)	1 (22)	–	**75** (384)	0.20
Klaus Täuber	(Germany)	1983	1987	FW	39 (88)	19 (37)	6 (13)	–	–	**64** (138)	0.46
Gerald Asamoah	(Germany)	1999	2013	FW	44 (279)	–	12 (30)	5 (51)	3 (21)	**64** (381)	0.17
Helmut Kremers	(Germany)	1971	1980	FW	45 (226)	–	12 (27)	1 (15)	1 (6)	**59** (274)	0.22
Rüdiger Abramczik	(Germany)	1973	1987	FW	44 (202)	–	10 (23)	4 (10)	–	**58** (235)	0.25
Erwin Kremers	(Germany)	1971	1978	MF	50 (212)	–	2 (27)	2 (15)	0 (6)	**54** (260)	0.21
Jefferson Farfán	(Peru)	2008	2015	FW	39 (170)	–	8 (17)	6 (40)	0 (1)	**53** (228)	0.23
Klaus Scheer	(Germany)	1969	1975	MF	38 (165)	–	5 (23)	3 (9)	2 (6)	**48** (203)	0.24
Peter Sendscheid	(Germany)	1989	1994	FW	18 (80)	28 (69)	0 (6)	–	–	**46** (155)	0.30
Rolf Rüssmann	(Germany)	1969	1980	DF	30 (304)	–	9 (42)	2 (19)	5 (10)	**46** (375)	0.12
Youri Mulder	(Netherlands)	1993	2002	FW	33 (177)	–	7 (13)	4 (12)	–	**44** (202)	0.22
**Kenan Karaman**	(Turkey)	2022	2026	FW	1 (29)	**40** (90)	2 (8)	–	–	**43** (127)	0.34
Aleksandr Borodyuk	(Russia)	1989	1993	FW	12 (63)	29 (61)	1 (6)	–	–	**42** (130)	0.32
Simon Terodde	(Germany)	2021	2024	FW	5 (32)	35 (58)	0 (5)	–	–	**40** (95)	0.42
Raúl	(Spain)	2010	2012	FW	28 (66)	–	3 (7)	9 (23)	0 (2)	**40** (98)	0.41
Martin Max	(Germany)	1995	1999	FW	33 (109)	–	2 (5)	4 (18)	0 (1)	**39** (133)	0.29
Marc Wilmots	(Belgium)	1996	2003	MF	27 (138)	–	2 (14)	9 (26)	–	**38** (178)	0.21
Hans-Jürgen Wittkamp	(Germany)	1967	1971	MF	30 (101)	–	6 (15)	1 (6)	–	**37** (122)	0.30
Manfred Drexler	(Germany)	1979	1984	MF	8 (67)	21 (62)	5 (13)	–	2 (2)	**35** (144)	0.24
Émile Mpenza	(Belgium)	2000	2003	FW	28 (79)	–	3 (8)	2 (7)	0 (2)	**33** (96)	0.34
Herbert Lütkebohmert	(Germany)	1968	1979	MF	28 (286)	–	3 (39)	1 (19)	1 (7)	**33** (351)	0.09
Guido Burgstaller	(Austria)	2017	2020	FW	24 (95)	–	4 (13)	4 (11)	–	**32** (119)	0.27
Andreas Müller	(Germany)	1988	2000	MF	17 (200)	13 (86)	2 (19)	0 (18)	–	**32** (323)	0.10
Lincoln	(Brazil)	2004	2007	MF	20 (83)	–	4 (9)	7 (19)	0 (6)	**31** (117)	0.26
Manfred Pohlschmidt	(Germany)	1967	1971	FW	26 (106)	–	5 (12)	0 (7)	–	**31** (125)	0.25
Jörg Böhme	(Germany)	2000	2004	MF	23 (101)	–	7 (12)	0 (10)	1 (8)	**31** (131)	0.24
Ulrich Bittcher	(Germany)	1976	1983	MF	19 (168)	10 (38)	2 (22)	0 (4)	0 (2)	**31** (234)	0.13
Julian Draxler	(Germany)	2011	2015	MF	18 (119)	–	5 (12)	7 (38)	0 (1)	**30** (170)	0.18
Hans-Joachim Abel	(Germany)	1982	1984	FW	9 (33)	14 (30)	6 (8)	–	0 (2)	**29** (73)	0.40
Hannes Bongartz	(Germany)	1974	1978	MF	24 (131)	–	2 (17)	2 (8)	–	**28** (156)	0.18
Günther Herrmann	(Germany)	1963	1967	MF	22 (110)	–	5 (9)	–	–	**27** (119)	0.23
Reinhard Libuda	(Germany)	1963	1974	FW	20 (190)	–	3 (28)	3 (7)	–	**26** (225)	0.12
Waldemar Gerhardt	(Germany)	1963	1965	FW	20 (52)	–	5 (6)	–	–	**25** (58)	0.43
Gerhard Neuser	(Germany)	1965	1970	MF	19 (143)	–	6 (12)	0 (7)	–	**25** (162)	0.15
Frank Hartmann	(Germany)	1984	1986	MF	20 (52)	–	4 (5)	–	–	**24** (57)	0.42
**Moussa Sylla**	(Mali)	2024	2026	FW	0 (5)	23 (57)	1 (4)	–	–	**24** (66)	0.36
Nico Braun	(Luxembourg)	1971	1973	FW	14 (35)	–	3 (6)	2 (4)	4 (7)	**23** (52)	0.44
Marius Bülter	(Germany)	2021	2023	FW	11 (33)	10 (32)	2 (4)	–	–	**23** (69)	0.33
Mike Hanke	(Germany)	2002	2005	FW	7 (58)	–	4 (8)	9 (13)	3 (8)	**23** (87)	0.26
Joël Matip	(Cameroon)	2009	2016	DF	17 (194)	–	2 (16)	4 (46)	0 (2)	**23** (258)	0.09
Benedikt Höwedes	(Germany)	2007	2017	DF	12 (240)	–	5 (27)	6 (66)	0 (2)	**23** (335)	0.07
Eric M. Choupo-Moting	(Cameroon)	2014	2017	FW	18 (82)	–	0 (5)	4 (19)	–	**22** (106)	0.21
Halil Altıntop	(Turkey)	2006	2009	FW	16 (96)	–	3 (11)	2 (17)	1 (5)	**22** (129)	0.17
Max Meyer	(Germany)	2013	2018	MF	17 (146)	–	2 (12)	3 (34)	–	**22** (192)	0.11
Klaus Matischak	(Germany)	1963	1964	FW	18 (22)	–	3 (3)	–	–	**21** (25)	0.84

==== Other records ====
Youngest and oldest

- Youngest player: Assan Ouédraogo – 17 years, 80 days (28 July 2023, 2. Bundesliga)
- Youngest Bundesliga player: Julian Draxler – 17 years, 117 days (15 January 2011)
- Youngest goalscorer: Assan Ouédraogo – 17 years, 80 days (28 July 2023, 2. Bundesliga)
- Youngest Bundesliga goalscorer: Julian Draxler – 17 years, 193 days (1 April 2011)
- Oldest player: Klaus Fichtel – 43 years, 184 days (21 May 1988, Bundesliga, also league record)
- Oldest goalscorer: **Edin Džeko** – 40 years, 160 days (24 August 2026, DFB-Pokal)
- Oldest league goalscorer: **Edin Džeko** – 39 years, 363 days (15 March 2026, 2. Bundesliga)
- Oldest Bundesliga goalscorer: Klaas-Jan Huntelaar – 37 years, 276 days (15 May 2021)

Goals

- Most goals in a season in all competitions: Klaas-Jan Huntelaar – 48 (2011–12)
- Most league goals in a season: Simon Terodde – 30 (2021–22, 2. Bundesliga)
- Most Bundesliga goals in a season: Klaus Fischer – 29 (1975–76), Klaas-Jan Huntelaar – 29 (2011–12)
- Most goals scored in a match: Klaus Scheer – 5 (1 September 1971, Bundesliga)
- Most penalty goals scored: Ingo Anderbrügge – 28 (of 33, 20 of 25 in Bundesliga)

Goalkeeping

- Most clean sheets: Norbert Nigbur – 133 (96 in Bundesliga)
- Most consecutive minutes without conceding a goal: Jens Lehmann – 597 (1996–97 md 16–23, Bundesliga)
- Most penalties saved: Norbert Nigbur – 18 (of 51, 16 of 42 in Bundesliga)

Internationals

- Most international caps as a Schalke 04 player: Jiří Němec – 64 (1994–2001, Czech Republic)
- Most international caps for Germany as a Schalke 04 player: Benedikt Höwedes – 44 (2011–2017)
- Most international goals as a Schalke 04 player: Klaas-Jan Huntelaar – 26 (2010–2015, Netherlands)
- Most international goals for Germany as a Schalke 04 player: Klaus Fischer – 23 (1977–1981)
- World Cup winners: Benedikt Höwedes (2014, appeared in final), Julian Draxler (2014), Helmut Kremers, Norbert Nigbur (both 1974, did not play)
- European Championship winners: Erwin Kremers (1972, appeared in final), Bent Christensen (1992, Denmark)

Transfers

- Highest transfer fee paid: Breel Embolo – €26.5 million (2016)
- Highest transfer fee received: Leroy Sané – €52.0 million (2016)

=== Pre-Bundesliga era ===
Statistics include all competitive matches from 1920 until 1963, unless a player ended his Schalke 04 career after 1963, then all of his matches are considered.

- GLW = Gauliga Westfalen (1933–1945)
- OLW = Oberliga West (1947–1963)
- OtL = Other leagues: Emscher-Kreisliga (1921–1926), Gauliga Ruhr (1926–1933), Landesliga Westfalen (1945–1947), Bundesliga (1963–)
- GC = German championship (1927–1962)
- Cup = Tschammer-Pokal (1935–1943), DFB-Pokal (1952–)
- EC = European competitions: European Cup (1958–59), Cup Winners' Cup (1969–70)
- OtC = Other competitions: Western German championship (1927–1933), Westphalian Cup (1943–1944), British zone championship (1947), Oberliga relegation play-offs (1949), Western German Cup (1953–1963), i.a.

==== Most appearances ====
Player	First	Last	S	Pos	GLW	OLW	OtL	GC	Cup	EC	OtC	Total
Ernst Kuzorra	1923	1949	24	FW	**164**	18	95	79	**39**	–	71	466
Fritz Szepan	1925	1949	22	FW	156	10	99	**87**	35	–	50	437
Bernhard Klodt	1943	1962	18	FW	14	**330**	21	24	8	**7**	21	425
Otto Tibulski	1932	1948	16	DF	162	34	23	77	34	–	19	349
Hermann Eppenhoff	1939	1955	14	FW	65	143	–	39	24	–	6	277
Hans-Jürgen Becher	1960	1971	11	DF	–	32	201	1	24	6	7	271
Willi Koslowski	1955	1965	10	FW	–	182	39	8	11	**7**	18	265
Reinhard Libuda	1962	1974	10	FW	–	25	190	–	32	7	4	258
Manfred Kreuz	1956	1968	12	FW	–	135	83	7	12	4	15	256
Ernst Kalwitzki	1933	1944	11	FW	150	–	–	66	36	–	1	253

==== Top goalscorers ====
Numbers in brackets indicate appearances made.

Player	First	Last	Pos	GLW	OLW	OtL	GC	Cup	OtC	Total	Ø
Ernst Kuzorra	1923	1949	FW	**147** (164)	1 (18)	141 (95)	48 (79)	26 (39)	82 (71)	**445** (466)	0.95
Fritz Szepan	1925	1949	FW	118 (156)	1 (10)	80 (99)	**56** (87)	19 (35)	37 (50)	**311** (437)	0.71
Ernst Kalwitzki	1933	1944	FW	113 (150)	–	–	54 (66)	**28** (36)	0 (1)	**195** (253)	0.77
Bernhard Klodt	1943	1962	FW	7 (14)	**129** (330)	14 (21)	10 (24)	0 (8)	8 (28)*	**168** (425)	0.40
Hermann Eppenhoff	1939	1955	FW	88 (65)	18 (143)	–	26 (39)	14 (24)	0 (6)	**146** (277)	0.53
Adolf Urban	1932	1943	FW	78 (80)	–	4 (3)	30 (46)	12 (24)	–	**124** (153)	0.81
Ernst Poertgen	1934	1938	FW	59 (59)	–	–	28 (24)	17 (18)	–	**104** (101)	1.03
Emil Rothardt	1924	1935	MF	10 (32)	–	55 (64)	14 (23)	–	23 (47)	**102** (166)	0.61
Herbert Burdenski	1940	1949	MF	28 (31)	16 (38)	31 (18)	7 (15)	8 (11)	3 (6)	**93** (119)	0.78
Hermann Nattkämper	1930	1936	MF	29 (49)	–	45 (33)	10 (30)	0 (6)	6 (10)	**90** (128)	0.70

includes 3 goals in 7 matches in European Cup

==== Other records ====
Youngest and oldest

- Youngest player: Otto Schrader – 15 years, 331 days (21 March 1937, Gauliga Westfalen)
- Youngest goalscorer: Otto Schrader – 15 years, 331 days (21 March 1937, Gauliga Westfalen)
- Oldest player: Ernst Kuzorra – 43 years, 92 days (16 January 1949, Oberliga West)
- Oldest goalscorer: Ernst Kuzorra – 41 years, 333 days (14 September 1947, Oberliga West)

Goals

- Most goals in a season in all competitions: Hermann Eppenhoff – 42 (1940–41)
- Most league goals in a season: Ernst Kuzorra – 34 (1929–30, Gauliga Ruhr)
- Most Gauliga Westfalen goals in a season: Hermann Eppenhoff – 28 (1940–41)
- Most Oberliga West goals in a season: Hans Kleina – 23 (1950–51)
- Most German championship goals in a season: Hermann Eppenhoff – 13 (1941)
- Most goals scored in a match: Herbert Burdenski – 8 (23 February 1947, Landesliga Westfalen)
- Most goals scored in a German championship match: Ernst Kalwitzki – 5 (18 June 1939, final)

Internationals

- First international cap as a Schalke 04 player: Ernst Kuzorra – 20 November 1927
- Most international caps as a Schalke 04 player: Fritz Szepan – 34 (1929–1939)
- Most international goals as a Schalke 04 player: Adolf Urban – 11 (1935–1942)
- World Cup winner: Bernhard Klodt (1954)

=== All time ===
==== Most appearances ====
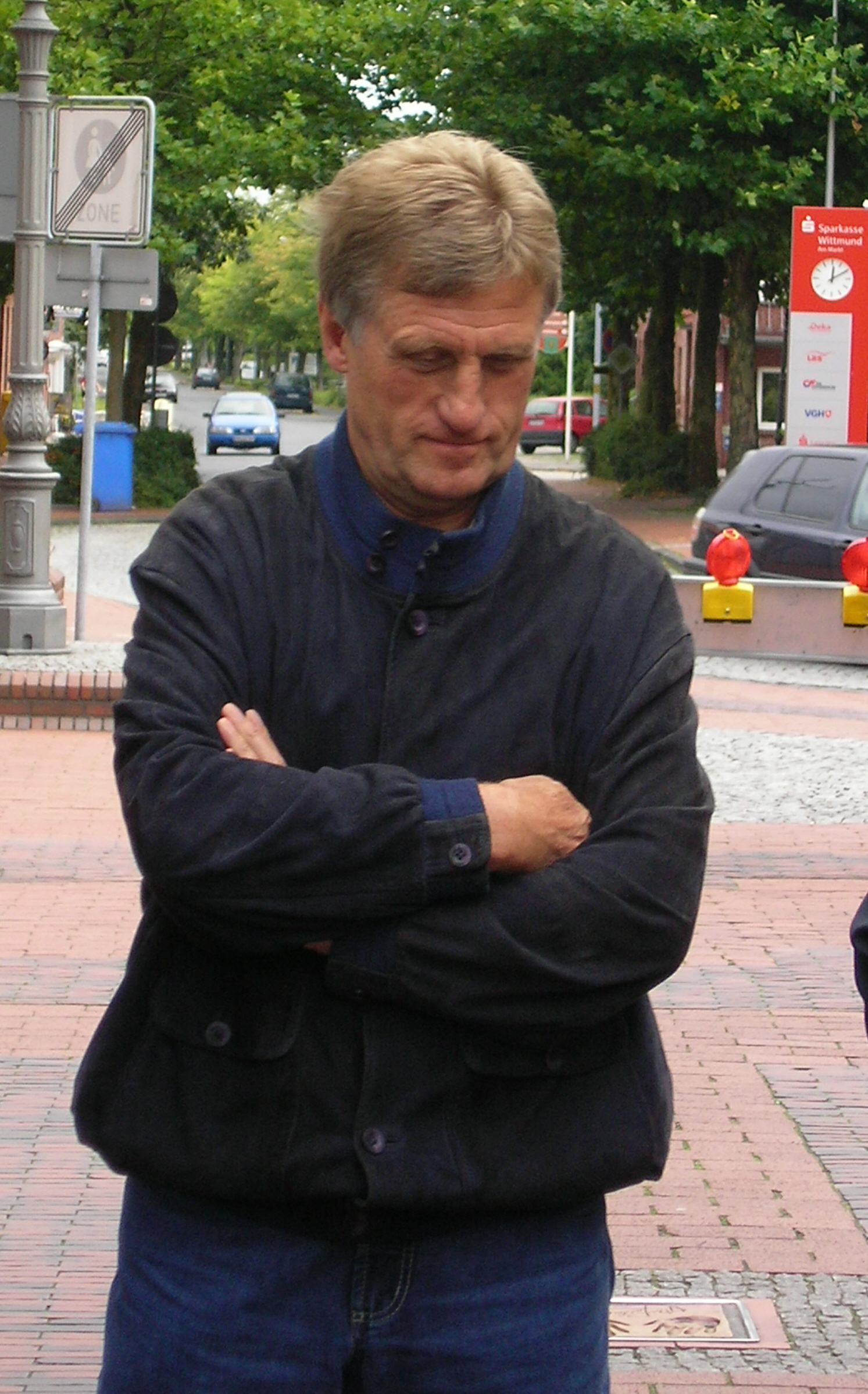
Klaus Fichtel

Player	First		Last		Sea- sons	Apps
Player	Year	Age	Year	Age	Sea- sons	Apps
Klaus Fichtel	1965	20	1988	43	19	556
Ernst Kuzorra	1923	17	1949	43	24	466
Norbert Nigbur	1966	18	1982	34	14	455
Fritz Szepan	1925	17	1949	41	22	437
Bernhard Klodt	1943	16	1962	35	18	425
Olaf Thon	1983	17	2002	35	13	384
Gerald Asamoah	1999	20	2013	34	12	381
Rolf Rüssmann	1969	19	1980	30	12	375
Ingo Anderbrügge	1988	24	1999	35	12	355
Herbert Lütkebohmert	1968	20	1979	31	11	351

==== Top goalscorers ====
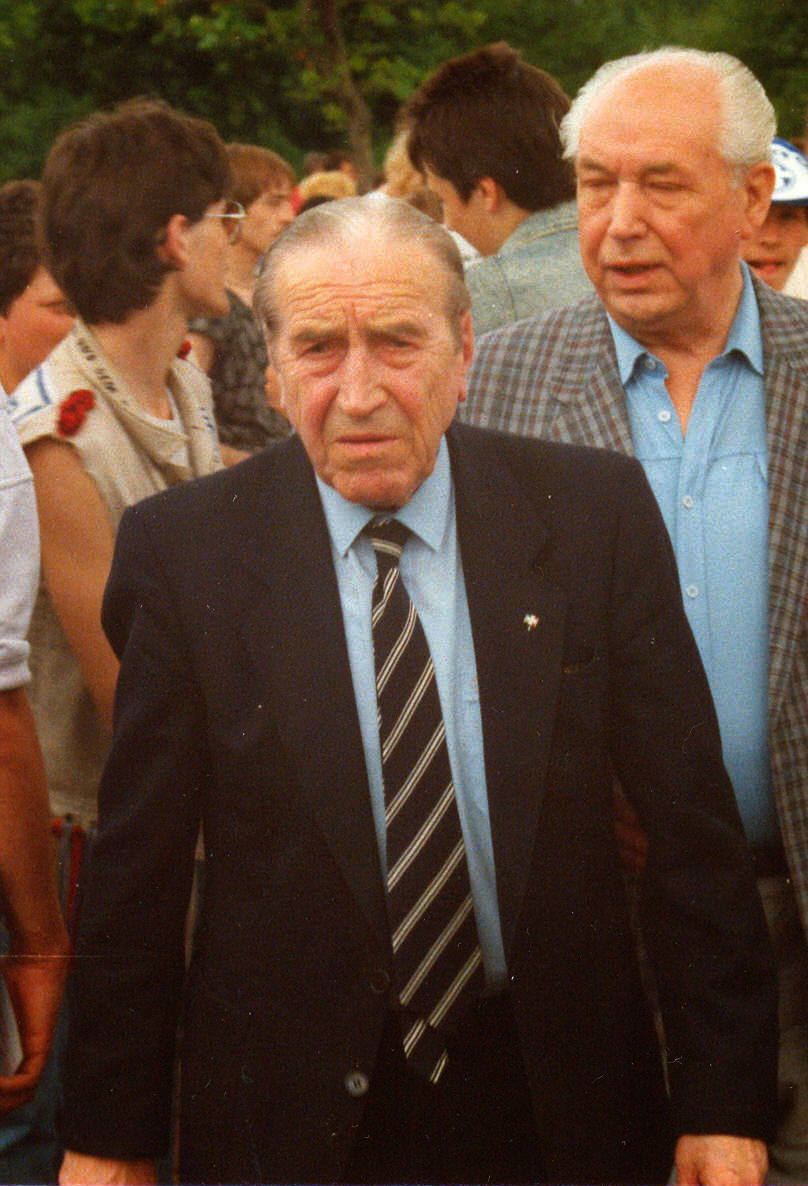
Ernst Kuzorra

Player	First		Last		Goals (Apps)	Ø
Player	Year	Age	Year	Age	Goals (Apps)	Ø
Ernst Kuzorra	1923	17	1949	43	**445** (466)	0.95
Fritz Szepan	1925	17	1949	41	**311** (437)	0.71
Klaus Fischer	1970	20	1981	31	**226** (349)	0.65
Ernst Kalwitzki	1933	23	1944	34	**195** (253)	0.77
Bernhard Klodt	1943	18	1962	35	**168** (425)	0.40
Hermann Eppenhoff	1938	19	1955	36	**146** (277)	0.53
Klaas-Jan Huntelaar	2010	27	2021	37	**128** (249)	0.51
Adolf Urban	1932	18	1943	29	**124** (153)	0.81
Ernst Poertgen	1934	22	1938	26	**104** (101)	1.03
Ebbe Sand	1999	27	2006	33	**104** (282)	0.37

== Manager records ==
Most matches managed

=== Bundesliga era ===
BL = Bundesliga, 2.BL = 2. Bundesliga, Cup = DFB-Pokal, EC = European competitions, OtC = Other competitions (Supercup, Ligapokal)

Manager	Nat	First	Last	S	BL	2.BL	Cup	EC	OtC	Total
Huub Stevens	(Netherlands)	1996	2020	10	249	–	23	42	3	317
Ivica Horvat	(Socialist Federal Republic of Yugoslavia)	1971	1979	5	157	–	20	6	10	193
Diethelm Ferner	(Germany)	1983	1989	4	68	55	18	–	–	141
Jörg Berger	(Germany)	1993	1996	4	99	–	9	2	–	110
Fritz Langner	(Germany)	1964	1967	4	99	–	10	–	–	109
Mirko Slomka	(Germany)	2006	2008	3	79	–	5	20	5	109
Ralf Rangnick	(Germany)	2004	2011	4	57	–	8	20	3	88
Friedel Rausch	(Germany)	1976	1977	3	65	–	10	10	–	85
Felix Magath	(Germany)	2009	2011	2	60	–	10	8	1	79
Jens Keller	(Germany)	2012	2014	3	58	–	5	14	–	77

=== Pre-Bundesliga era ===
OLW = Oberliga West, GWL = Gauliga Westfalen, Cup = DFB-Pokal, GC = German championship, EC = European Cup

Manager	Nat	First	Last	S	OLW	GWL	GC	Cup	EC	Total
Eduard Frühwirth	(Austria)	1954	1959	5	150	–	11	7	7	175
Fritz Szepan	(Germany)	1949	1954	5	150	–	12	1	–	163
Hans Schmidt	(Germany)	1933	1938	5	–	90	41	19	–	150

== Team records ==
=== Bundesliga era ===
Matches

- Record league win: 7–0 vs. FC Bayern Munich (a), Bundesliga, 9 October 1976
- Record league home win: 6–0 each vs. SpVgg Bayreuth, 24 October 1981; SC Freiburg, 29 October 1983; Darmstadt 98, 10 March 1984; all 2. Bundesliga
- Record Bundesliga home win: 6–1 each vs. Kickers Offenbach, 4 October 1972; Fortuna Köln, 2 March 1974; Borussia Dortmund, 10 December 1985
- Record league home goals scored: 7–4 vs. Bayer Leverkusen, 11 Februar 2006
- Record DFB-Pokal win: 11–1 vs. FC Teningen (a), 31 July 2011
- Record DFB-Pokal final win: 5–0 each vs. 1. FC Kaiserslautern, 1 July 1972; MSV Duisburg, 21 May 2011
- Record European win: 6–1 vs. HJK Helsinki (h), Europa League, 25 August 2011
- Record Champions League win: 4–0 vs. RCD Mallorca (a), 16 October 2001
- Record Revierderby win: 6–1 vs. Borussia Dortmund (h), Bundesliga, 10 December 1985
- Record defeat: 0–11 vs. Borussia Mönchengladbach (a), Bundesliga, 7 January 1967

League

- Most league wins in a season: 24 (Bundesliga, 1971–72, 34 games)
- Most league goals scored in a season: 95 (2. Bundesliga, 1983–84, 38 games)
- Most Bundesliga goals scored in a season: 77 (1976–77, 34 games)
- Fewest league goals conceded in a season: 29 (2. Bundesliga, 1990–91, 38 games)
- Fewest Bundesliga goals conceded in a season: 31 each (2005–06, 2009–10, 34 games)
- Most consecutive league wins: 6 each (Bundesliga, 2004–05 md 7–12, 2006–07 md 16–21, 2017–18 md 23–28; 2. Bundesliga, 1990–91 md 3–8)
- Most consecutive league matches without a defeat: 14 (Bundesliga, 1976–77 md 29 – 1977–78 md 8)
- Most consecutive league matches without a defeat within a season: 13 each (Bundesliga, 1997–98 md 16–28, 2006–07 md 10–22)
- Most consecutive league matches without a win: 30 (Bundesliga, 2019–20 md 19 – 2020–21 md 14)

=== Pre-Bundesliga era ===
Matches

- Record league win: 20–0 vs. SpVgg Herten (a), Landesliga Westfalen, 23 February 1947
- Record league home win: 15–1 vs. Union Recklinghausen, Gauliga Westfalen, 16 February 1936
- Record Oberliga West win: 8–0 vs. Borussia Mönchengladbach (h), 24. September 1950
- Record German championship win: 16–0 vs. CSC 03 Kassel (h), 16 June 1940
- Record German championship final win: 9–0 vs. Admira Vienna (in Berlin), 18. June 1939
- Record DFB-Pokal win: 13–0 vs. VfvB Alsum (a), 20. August 1939
- Record European win: 5–2 vs. KB Copenhagen (h), European Cup, 18 September 1958
- Record Revierderby win: 10–0 vs. Borussia Dortmund (h), Gauliga Westfalen, 20 October 1940

League

- Most league wins in a season: 21 (Gauliga Westfalen, 1940–41, 22 games)
- Most league goals scored in a season: 103 (Gauliga Westfalen, 1936–37, 18 games)
- Fewest league goals conceded in a season: 10 each (Gauliga Westfalen, 1934–35, 1937–38, 1941–42, 1943–44, 18 games)
- Most consecutive league wins: 26 (Gauliga Westfalen, 1935–36 md 4 – 1936–37 md 11)
- Most consecutive league wins with a season: 16 (Gauliga Westfalen, 1942–43 md 3–18)
- Most consecutive league matches without a defeat: 84 (Gauliga Westfalen, 1934–35 md 18 – 1939–40 md 11)

== Honours ==
Competition	#	Years
International title
UEFA Cup	1	1997
National titles
German Championship	7	1934, 1935, 1937, 1939, 1940, 1942, 1958
DFB-Pokal	5	1937, 1972, 2001, 2002, 2011
DFL-Supercup	1	2011
DFL-Ligapokal	1	2005
2. Bundesliga	4	1982, 1991, 2022, 2026
Regional titles
Oberliga West	2	1951, 1958
Landesliga Westfalen	2	1946, 1947
Gauliga Westfalen	11	1934, 1935, 1936, 1937, 1938, 1939, 1940, 1941, 1942, 1943, 1944
Western German Championship	4	1929, 1930, 1932, 1933
Western German Cup	1	1954
Westphalian Cup	2	1943, 1944

== See also ==
- List of FC Schalke 04 players
- List of FC Schalke 04 managers
- List of FC Schalke 04 seasons
- FC Schalke 04 in European football

== Sources ==
- Königsblau: Die Geschichte des FC Schalke 04. Die Werkstatt. 2015. ISBN 978-3-7307-0204-8.
- "FC Schalke 04 » Players from A-Z". worldfootball.net.
- "Rekordlisten". FC Schalke 04 (in German).
