= 1972 DFB-Pokal final =

- Match programme cover
- Event: 1971–72 DFB-Pokal
Schalke 04	1. FC Kaiserslautern
5	0
- Date: 1 July 1972
- Venue: Niedersachsenstadion, Hanover
- Referee: Heinz Aldinger (Waiblingen)
- Attendance: 61,000

The 1972 DFB-Pokal final decided the winner of the 1971–72 DFB-Pokal, the 29th season of Germany's knockout football cup competition. It was played on 1 July 1972 at the Niedersachsenstadion in Hanover. Schalke 04 won the match 5–0 against 1. FC Kaiserslautern, to claim their 2nd cup title.

== Route to the final ==
The DFB-Pokal began with 32 teams in a two-legged knockout cup competition. There were a total of four rounds leading up to the final. Teams were drawn against each other, and following two legs of 90 minutes each, the winner on aggregate would advance. If still tied, 30 minutes of extra time was played. If the score was still level, a penalty shoot-out was used to determine the winner.

Note: In all results below, the score of the finalist is given first (H: home; A: away).

Schalke 04				Round	1. FC Kaiserslautern			
Opponent	Agg.	1st leg	2nd leg	1971–72 DFB-Pokal	Opponent	Agg.	1st leg	2nd leg
Hertha BSC	5–1	3–1 (H)	2–0 (awarded) (A)	Round 1	Wuppertaler SV	4–4 (5–3 p)	1–2 (A)	3–2 (a.e.t.) (H)
Fortuna Düsseldorf	3–2	1–1 (A)	2–1 (H)	Round of 16	VfB Stuttgart	6–5	3–4 (A)	3–1 (H)
Borussia Mönchengladbach	3–2	2–2 (A)	1–0 (H)	Quarter-finals	Rot-Weiß Oberhausen	6–3	1–3 (A)	5–0 (a.e.t.) (H)
1. FC Köln	6–6 (6–5 p)	1–4 (A)	5–2 (a.e.t.) (H)	Semi-finals	Werder Bremen	4–2	2–1 (H)	2–1 (A)

== Match ==
=== Details ===
1 July 1972
16:00 CET

Schalke 04	5–0	1. FC Kaiserslautern
H. Kremers 13', 82'; Scheer 32'; Lütkebohmert 57'; Fischer 66'	Report

Niedersachsenstadion, Hanover
Attendance: 61,000
Referee: Heinz Aldinger (Waiblingen)

Schalke 04	1. FC Kaiserslautern

GK	1	(West Germany) Norbert Nigbur
RB		(West Germany) Hartmut Huhse
CB		(West Germany) Rolf Rüssmann
CB		(West Germany) Klaus Fichtel
LB		(West Germany) Helmut Kremers
CM		(West Germany) Herbert Lütkebohmert
CM		(Netherlands) Heinz van Haaren
CM		(West Germany) Klaus Scheer
RW		(West Germany) Reinhard Libuda (c)
CF		(West Germany) Klaus Fischer
LW		(West Germany) Erwin Kremers
Manager:
(Socialist Federal Republic of Yugoslavia) Ivica Horvat

GK	1	(West Germany) Josef Elting
RB		(West Germany) Günther Reinders
CB		(West Germany) Dietmar Schwager
CB		(West Germany) Ernst Diehl
LB		(West Germany) Fritz Fuchs
RM		(West Germany) Josef Pirrung
CM		(West Germany) Jürgen Friedrich (c)
CM		(West Germany) Hermann Bitz
LM		(Socialist Federal Republic of Yugoslavia) Idriz Hošić	(substituted off) 55'
CF		(West Germany) Wolfgang Seel
CF		(West Germany) Klaus Ackermann
Substitutes:
FW		(West Germany) Karl-Heinz Vogt	(substituted in) 55'
Manager:
(West Germany) Dietrich Weise

Match rules

- 90 minutes.
- 30 minutes of extra time if necessary.
- Replay if scores still level.
- Maximum of two substitutions.
