= List of FC Schalke 04 managers =

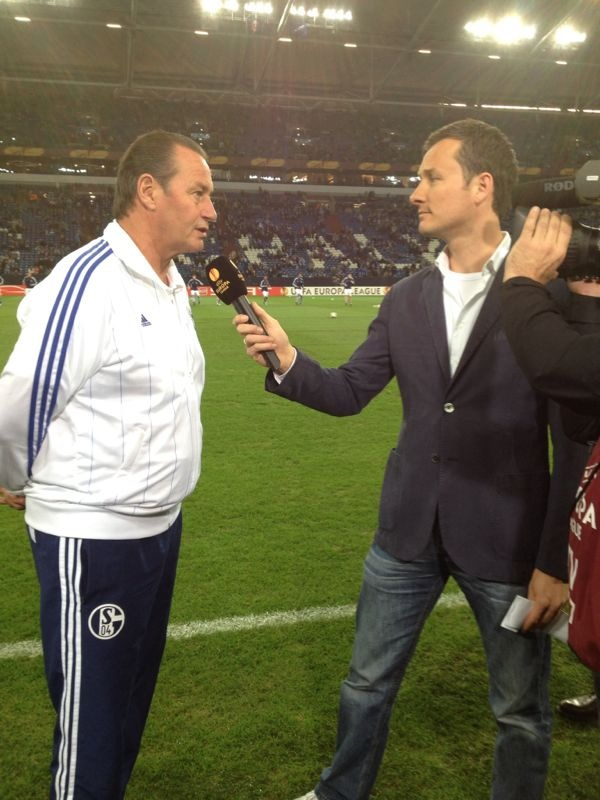
Huub Stevens managed the club in four spells: firstly, from 1996 to 2002, where he won the UEFA Cup in 1997, secondly, from 2011 to 2012, and as an interim in 2019 and 2020. He was voted 'Coach of the Century' by Schalke fans in 1999.

Fußballclub Gelsenkirchen-Schalke 04 e. V. is a German football club based in Gelsenkirchen, North Rhine-Westphalia. Since 1925, there have been fifty-six official managers, with the current incumbent, Karel Geraerts, appointed on 9 October 2023.

Statistically, the club's most successful manager is Ralf Rangnick, during his first spell at the club, with a win percentage of 55.38. However, the club's most successful period came in the 1930s and the early 1940s, under the tenureship of Hans Schmidt and Otto Faist. It is likely Schmidt is actually the club's most successful manager, given the dominance that Schalke had at the time, but this cannot be proven due to the lack of statistics.

== Managerial history ==
Although the club was founded in 1904, its first official manager was Heinz Ludewig, who was appointed in 1925. Schalke attained success through their style of play that used short, sharp, man-to-man passing to move the ball, later becoming famously known as the Schalker Kreisel. With the re-organisation of German football in 1933, under Nazi Germany, Schalke were placed in the Gauliga Westfalen. This period was their most successful decade in their history: from 1933 to 1942, the club would appear in 14 of 18 national finals (10 in the German championship and 8 in the Tschammerpokal) and win their league in every one of its eleven seasons.

After World War II, Schalke found it difficult to return to their earlier form, playing just twice in 1945. Club legends Ernst Kuzorra and Fritz Szepan managed the team during this period. They did gain some silverware towards the end of the 1950s, with the club winning the German championship in 1958, during Edi Frühwirth's tenureship. This however, has been the last championship won by the club, as Schalke have not won the Bundesliga since its inception in 1963.

Under Ivica Horvat, the club was close to winning the Bundesliga, finishing runners-up to Bayern Munich by three points in 1972, having led the league for most of the season. They did however, win the DFB-Pokal in the same season. The club was affected by the Bundesliga scandal of 1971, with several of its players banned for life. Though these sentences were later rescinded and commuted to bans ranging from six months to two years, the scandal had a profound effect on what might have possibly become one of the dominant German teams of the 1970s. In the 1980s, the club ran into trouble and were twice relegated to the 2.Bundesliga during the decade, firstly in 1983 under Jürgen Sundermann, and secondly in 1988 under Horst Franz.

Schalke returned to the Bundesliga in 1992, where they have remained ever since. Their most notable success in the 1990s was winning the UEFA Cup in 1997 under the guidance of Dutchman Huub Stevens. In the 2000s, and with Stevens still in charge, the club endured a similar season to 1972, with Schalke leading the league for most of the season, only to lose it again to Bayern, this time on goal difference. Like the 1971–72 season, the club won the DFB-Pokal cup. Afterwards, Schalke would be runners-up on three occasions, under Ralf Rangnick, Mirko Slomka and Felix Magath respectively, and were a regular competitor in the UEFA Champions League, reaching the semi-finals in 2011, during Rangnick's second spell with the club.

== Managerial statistics ==
=== Pre-Bundesliga era ===
Name	Nat.	From	To	Honours
Heinz Ludewig	(Germany)	3 April 1925	18 June 1927	Western German football championship runners-up (1927)
Guggi Wieser	(Austria)	19 June 1927	30 June 1929	1 Western German football championship (1929)
Kurt Otto	(Germany)	1 July 1929	30 June 1930	1 Western German football championship (1930)
August Sobottka	(Germany)	1 July 1930	30 June 1931	
Hans Sauerwein	(Germany)	1 July 1931	30 June 1932	1 Western German football championship (1932)
Kurt Otto	(Germany)	1 July 1932	30 June 1933	1 Western German football championship (1933)
Hans Schmidt	(Germany)	1 July 1933	12 June 1938	3 German championships (1934, 1935, 1937); German championship runners-up (1933, 1938); 5 Gauliga Westfalen championships (1934, 1935, 1936, 1937, 1938); 1 Tschammerpokal (1937); runners-up (1935, 1936)
Otto Faist	(Germany)	13 July 1938	31 December 1942	3 German championships (1939, 1940, 1942); German championship runners-up (1941); 4 Gauliga Westfalen championships (1939, 1940, 1941, 1942); Tschammerpokal runners-up (1941, 1942)
Ernst Kuzorra	(Germany)	1 July 1946	30 September 1947	
Willi Schäfer	(Germany)	1 October 1947	30 June 1948	
Theo Langl	(Germany)	1 July 1948	31 October 1948	
Ferdl Swatosch	(Austria)	1 November 1948	30 June 1949	
Fritz Szepan	(Germany)	1 July 1949	30 June 1954	1 Oberliga West championship (1951); runners-up (1952)
Edi Frühwirth	(Austria)	1 July 1954	30 June 1959	1 German championship (1958); 1 Oberliga West championship (1958); runners-up (1956); DFB-Pokal runners-up (1955)
Nandor Lengyel	(Hungary)	1 July 1959	30 June 1960	
Georg Gawliczek	(Germany)	1 July 1960	30 June 1963	Oberliga West runners-up (1962)

=== Bundesliga era ===
Key

- Nat. = Nationality
- M = Matches managed
- W = Matches won
- D = Matches drawn
- L = Matches lost
- Win% = Win ratio

Information correct as of 22 November 2026. Only competitive matches are counted.

Name	Nat.	From	To	Duration	M	W	D	L	Win%	Honours
Georg Gawliczek	(Germany)	1 July 1963	25 April 1964	299 days	31	14	4	13	45.16	
Fritz Langner	(Germany)	26 April 1964	5 June 1967	3 years, 40 days	109	35	22	52	32.11	
Karl-Heinz Marotzke	(Germany)	1 July 1967	13 November 1967	135 days	13	1	3	9	7.69	
Günter Brocker	(Germany)	14 November 1967	17 November 1968	1 year, 3 days	38	15	7	16	39.47	
Rudi Gutendorf	(Germany)	22 November 1968	8 September 1970	1 year, 290 days	74	32	22	20	43.24	DFB-Pokal runners-up (1968–69)
Slobodan Čendić	(Socialist Federal Republic of Yugoslavia)	8 September 1970	30 June 1971	295 days	35	16	6	13	45.71	
Ivica Horvat	(Socialist Federal Republic of Yugoslavia)	1 July 1971	30 June 1975	3 years, 364 days	169	87	29	53	51.48	Bundesliga runners-up (1971–72); 1 DFB-Pokal (1971–72)
Max Merkel	(Austria)	1 July 1975	9 March 1976	252 days	25	9	8	8	36.00	
Friedel Rausch	(Germany)	10 March 1976	20 December 1977	1 year, 285 days	85	43	20	22	50.59	Bundesliga runners-up (1976–77)
Uli Maslo	(Germany)	21 December 1977	24 May 1978	154 days	16	6	2	8	37.50	
Ivica Horvat	(Socialist Federal Republic of Yugoslavia)	1 July 1978	17 March 1979	259 days	24	8	6	10	33.33	
Gyula Lóránt	(Hungary)	19 March 1979	4 December 1979	260 days	30	11	9	10	36.67	
Dietmar Schwager	(Germany)	5 December 1979	20 April 1980	137 days	17	8	3	6	47.06	
Fahrudin Jusufi	(Socialist Federal Republic of Yugoslavia)	21 April 1980	26 May 1981	1 year, 35 days	38	9	7	22	23.68	
Rudi Assauer (a.i.)	(Germany)	27 May 1981	30 June 1981	34 days	3	0	1	2	0.00	
Sigfried Held	(Germany)	1 July 1981	20 January 1983	1 year, 203 days	59	24	18	17	40.68	2. Bundesliga champions (1981–82)
Rudi Assauer (a.i.)	(Germany)	21 January 1983	23 January 1983	2 days	1	0	1	0	0.00	
Jürgen Sundermann	(Germany)	24 January 1983	30 June 1983	157 days	20	6	2	12	30.00	
Diethelm Ferner	(Germany)	1 July 1983	30 June 1986	2 years, 364 days	121	56	28	37	46.28	2. Bundesliga runners-up (1983–84)
Rolf Schafstall	(Germany)	1 July 1986	7 December 1987	1 year, 159 days	54	17	11	26	31.48	
Horst Franz	(Germany)	1 January 1988	18 September 1988	261 days	27	5	7	15	18.52	
Diethelm Ferner	(Germany)	18 September 1988	6 April 1989	200 days	20	6	7	7	30.00	
Helmut Kremers (a.i.)	(Germany)	7 April 1989	10 April 1989	3 days	1	1	0	0	100.00	
Peter Neururer	(Germany)	11 April 1989	13 November 1990	1 year, 216 days	69	35	16	18	50.72	
Klaus Fischer (a.i.)	(Germany)	14 November 1990	15 January 1991	−15 days	5	1	3	1	20.00	
Aleksandar Ristić	(Bosnia and Herzegovina)	16 January 1991	30 April 1992	1 year, 105 days	52	20	17	15	38.46	2. Bundesliga champions (1990–91)
Klaus Fischer (a.i.)	(Germany)	30 April 1992	30 June 1992	61 days	4	2	0	2	50.00	
Udo Lattek	(Germany)	1 July 1992	17 January 1993	200 days	19	6	6	7	31.58	
Helmut Schulte	(Germany)	18 January 1993	9 October 1993	264 days	30	8	9	13	26.67	
Jörg Berger	(Germany)	12 October 1993	3 October 1996	2 years, 357 days	110	42	36	32	38.18	
Hubert Neu (a.i.)	(Germany)	4 October 1996	7 October 1996	3 days	1	0	0	1	0.00	
Huub Stevens	(Netherlands)	8 October 1996	30 June 2002	5 years, 265 days	242	105	65	72	43.39	Bundesliga runners-up (2000–01); 2 DFB-Pokals (2000–01, 2001–02); 1 UEFA Cup (1997)
Frank Neubarth	(Germany)	1 July 2002	26 March 2003	268 days	37	15	15	7	40.54	
Marc Wilmots (a.i.)	(Belgium)	26 March 2003	24 June 2003	90 days	8	3	1	4	37.50	
Jupp Heynckes	(Germany)	25 June 2003	15 September 2004	1 year, 82 days	57	28	14	15	49.12	
Eddy Achterberg (a.i.)	(Netherlands)	15 September 2004	28 September 2004	13 days	4	2	1	1	50.00	
Ralf Rangnick	(Germany)	28 September 2004	12 December 2005	1 year, 75 days	65	36	15	14	55.38	Bundesliga runners-up (2004–05); DFB-Pokal runners-up (2004–05); 1 DFL-Ligapokal (2005)
Oliver Reck (a.i.)	(Germany)	12 December 2005	4 January 2006	23 days	1	0	0	1	0.00	
Mirko Slomka	(Germany)	4 January 2006	13 April 2008	2 years, 100 days	109	55	28	26	50.46	Bundesliga runners-up (2006–07)
Mike Büskens (a.i.)	(Germany)	14 April 2008	30 June 2008	77 days	6	5	1	0	83.33	
Fred Rutten	(Netherlands)	1 July 2008	26 March 2009	268 days	37	16	9	12	43.24	
Mike Büskens (a.i.)	(Germany)	27 March 2009	21 June 2009	86 days	9	4	1	4	44.44	
Felix Magath	(Germany)	22 June 2009	16 March 2011	1 year, 267 days	79	42	16	21	53.16	Bundesliga runners-up (2009–10); 1 DFL-Supercup (2010)
Seppo Eichkorn (a.i.)	(Germany)	17 March 2011	20 March 2011	3 days	1	0	0	1	0.00	
Ralf Rangnick	(Germany)	21 March 2011	22 September 2011	185 days	23	10	3	10	43.48	1 DFB-Pokal (2010–11); 1 DFL-Supercup (2010
Seppo Eichkorn (a.i.)	(Germany)	23 September 2011	26 September 2011	3 days	3	2	0	1	66.67	
Huub Stevens	(Netherlands)	27 September 2011	16 December 2012	1 year, 80 days	63	34	14	15	53.97	
Jens Keller	(Germany)	16 December 2012	7 October 2014	1 year, 295 days	77	36	16	25	46.75	
Roberto Di Matteo	(Italy)	7 October 2014	26 May 2015	231 days	33	14	7	12	42.42	
André Breitenreiter	(Germany)	12 June 2015	15 May 2016	338 days	44	20	10	14	45.45	
Markus Weinzierl	(Germany)	26 June 2016	9 June 2017	348 days	50	21	13	16	42.00	
Domenico Tedesco	(Germany) / (Italy)	9 June 2017	14 March 2019	1 year, 278 days	75	33	17	25	44.00	Bundesliga runners-up (2017–18)
Huub Stevens (a.i.)	(Netherlands)	14 March 2019	30 June 2019	108 days	10	2	4	4	20.00	
David Wagner	(United States) / (Germany)	1 July 2019	27 September 2020	1 year, 88 days	40	12	12	16	30.00	
Manuel Baum	(Germany)	30 September 2020	18 December 2020	79 days	11	1	4	6	9.09	
Huub Stevens (a.i.)	(Netherlands)	18 December 2020	22 December 2020	4 days	2	1	0	1	50.00	
Christian Gross	(Switzerland)	27 December 2020	28 February 2021	63 days	11	1	2	8	9.09	
Dimitrios Grammozis	(Greece)	2 March 2021	6 March 2022	1 year, 4 days	38	15	6	17	39.47	
Mike Büskens (a.i.)	(Germany)	7 March 2022	15 May 2022	69 days	9	8	0	1	88.89	2. Bundesliga champions (2021–22)
Frank Kramer	(Germany)	7 June 2022	19 October 2022	134 days	12	2	3	7	16.67	
Matthias Kreutzer (a.i.)	(Germany)	20 October 2022	27 October 2022	7 days	1	0	0	1	0.00	
Thomas Reis	(Germany)	27 October 2022	27 September 2023	335 days	31	9	8	14	29.03	
Matthias Kreutzer (a.i.)	(Germany)	27 September 2023	8 October 2023	11 days	2	0	0	2	0.00	
Karel Geraerts	(Belgium)	9 October 2023	21 September 2024	348 days	33	12	7	14	36.36	
Jakob Fimpel (a.i.)	(Germany)	21 September 2024	5 October 2024	14 days	2	1	1	0	50.00	
Kees van Wonderen	(Netherlands)	6 October 2024	3 May 2025	209 days	25	8	6	11	32.00	
Jakob Fimpel (a.i.)	(Germany)	3 May 2025	18 May 2025	15 days	2	0	0	2	0.00	
Miron Muslić	(Austria)	31 May 2025		1 year, 175 days	48	24	11	13	50.00	

==== Most league matches ====
Rk	Manager	Nat.	Total					Bundesliga					2. Bundesliga					Years
Rk	Manager	Nat.	M	W	D	L	P (Note: Points per game based on the three-point-per-win rule)	M	W	D	L	P	M	W	D	L	P	Years
1	Huub Stevens	(Netherlands)	249	101	72	76	1.51	249	101	72	76	1.51	–					1996–2002, 2011–2012, 2019, 2020
2	Ivica Horvat	(Socialist Federal Republic of Yugoslavia)	157	72	30	55	1.57	157	72	30	55	1.57	–					1971–1975, 1978–1979
3	Diethelm Ferner	(Germany)	123	52	31	40	1.52	68	24	16	28	1.29	55	28	15	12	1.80	1983–1986, 1988–1989
4	Jörg Berger	(Germany)	99	35	35	29	1.41	99	35	35	29	1.41	–					1993–1996
4	Fritz Langner	(Germany)	99	29	22	48	1.10	99	29	22	48	1.10	–					1964–1967
6	Mirko Slomka	(Germany)	79	42	20	17	1.85	79	42	20	17	1.85	–					2006–2008
7	Peter Neururer	(Germany)	66	33	16	17	1.74	–					66	33	16	17	1.74	1989–1990
8	Friedel Rausch	(Germany)	65	31	16	18	1.68	65	31	16	18	1.68	–					1976–1977
9	Felix Magath	(Germany)	60	28	14	18	1.63	60	28	14	18	1.63	–					2009–2011
10	Domenico Tedesco	(Germany)	59	24	14	21	1.46	59	24	14	21	1.46	–					2017–2019
11	Jens Keller	(Germany)	58	30	12	16	1.76	58	30	12	16	1.76	–					2012–2014
12	Ralf Rangnick	(Germany)	57	31	11	15	1.82	57	31	11	15	1.82	–					2004–2005, 2011
12	Rudi Gutendorf	(Germany)	57	22	19	16	1.49	57	22	19	16	1.49	–					1968–1970
14	Sigfried Held	(Germany)	55	22	17	16	1.51	17	3	4	10	0.76	38	19	13	6	1.84	1981–1982
15	Rolf Schafstall	(Germany)	52	17	11	24	1.19	52	17	11	24	1.19	–					1986–1987
16	Aleksandar Ristić	(Bosnia and Herzegovina)	51	20	17	14	1.51	34	9	12	13	1.15	17	11	5	1	2.24	1991–1992
Minimum 50 total league matches
