= Revierderby =

Association football rivalry in Germany

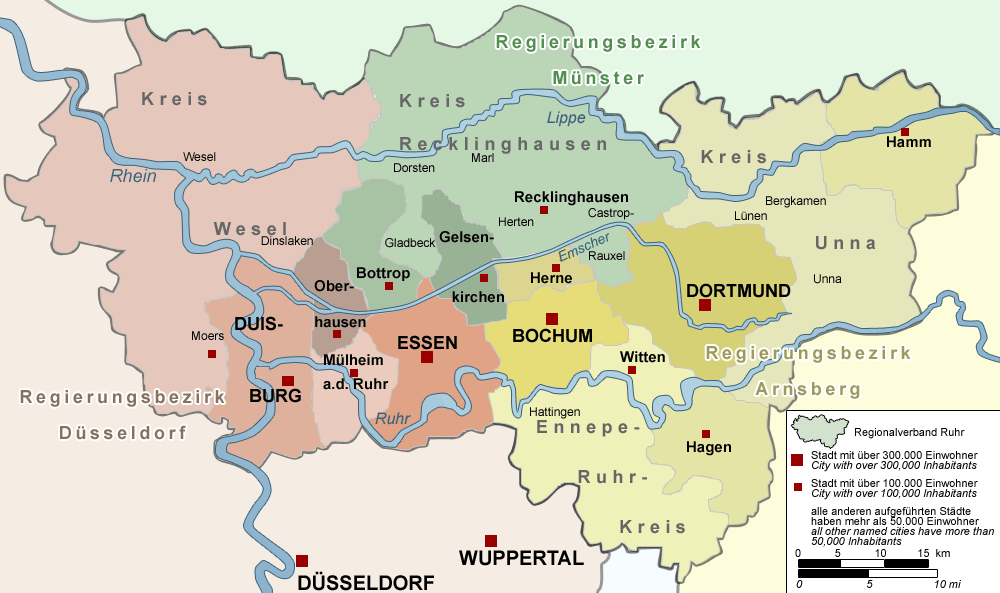
- Map of the Ruhr area including Dortmund and Gelsenkirchen

- Borussia Dortmund FC Schalke 04
- Other names: Ruhr derby
- Location: North Rhine-Westphalia
- First meeting: 3 May 1925; Schalke 4–2 Dortmund
- Latest meeting: 11 March 2023; Bundesliga; Schalke 2–2 Dortmund
- Next meeting: 6 December 2026; Bundesliga; Schalke vs Dortmund
- Stadiums: Signal Iduna Park (Dortmund); Veltins-Arena (Schalke)

Statistics
- Total meetings: 160
- Most wins: Schalke (60)
- All-time series: Dortmund: 56; Drawn: 44; Schalke: 60
- Largest victory: Schalke 10–0 Dortmund (20 October 1940)

The Revierderby (pronounced [ʁeˈviːɐ̯ˌdœɐ̯biː]) is the name given to any association football match between two clubs in the Ruhr region – also known in German as the Revier, a contraction of Bergbaurevier (mining area) – in North Rhine-Westphalia, but in most cases it refers to the derby between two most historically successful clubs from the region: Borussia Dortmund and FC Schalke 04. Outside Germany, it is often referred to as the Ruhr derby.

A local derby between other Ruhr teams (for example VfL Bochum, MSV Duisburg, or Rot-Weiss Essen) is often called a kleines Revierderby (minor Revier derby).

It is considered the greatest rivalry in German football.

== History and results ==
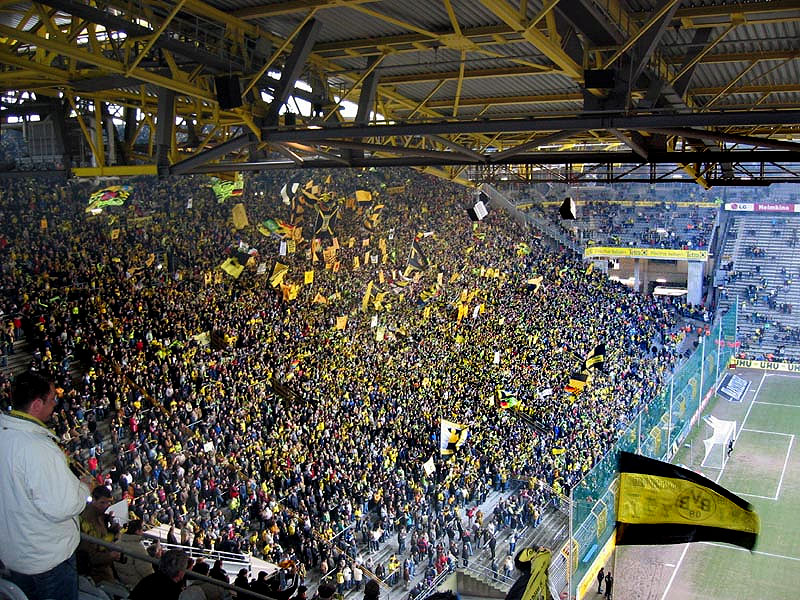
Fans of Borussia Dortmund at home in the Signal Iduna Park

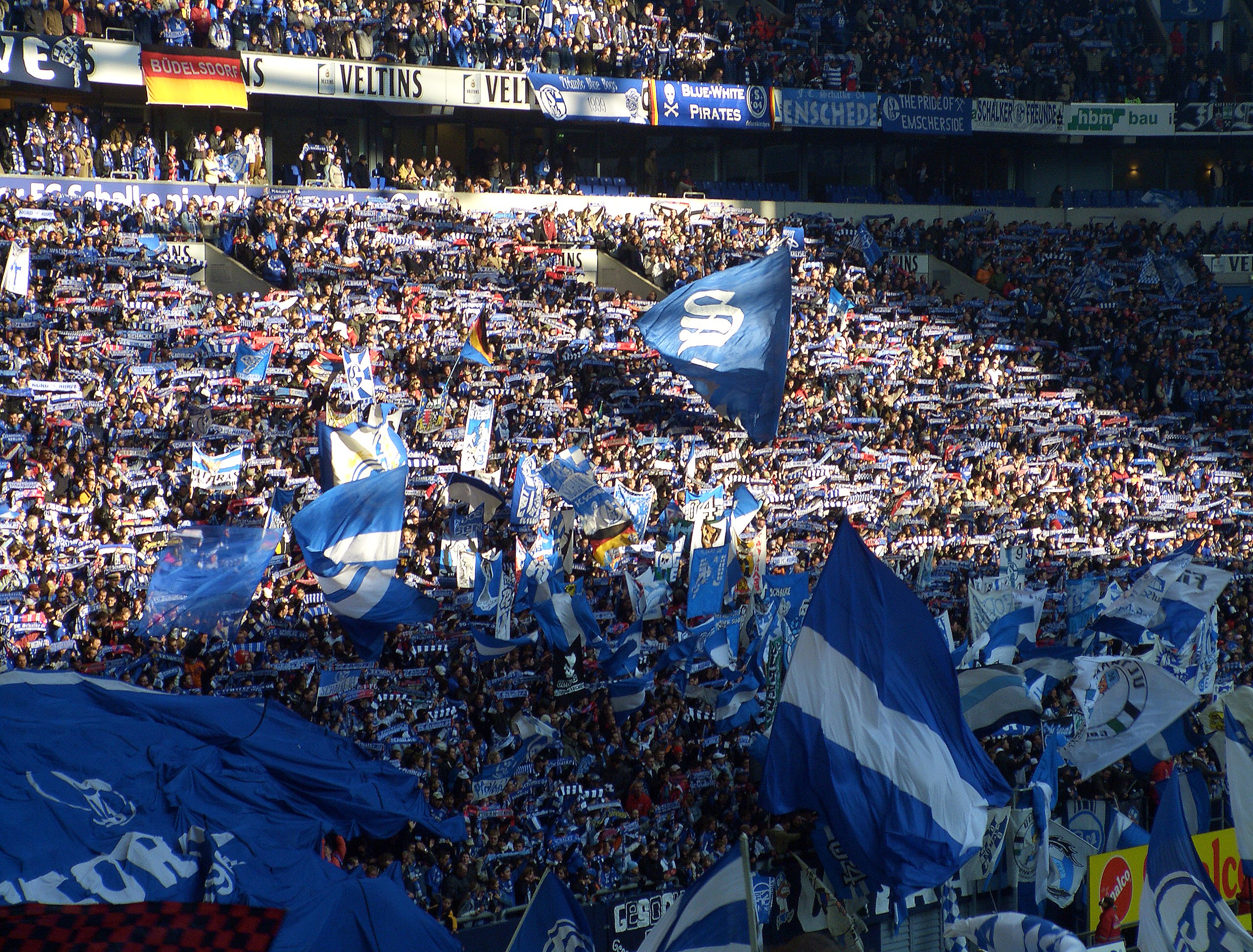
Fans of Schalke 04 at home in the Veltins-Arena in Gelsenkirchen

=== 1925–1936: The beginning ===
The rivalry began with a 4–2 Schalke victory on 3 May 1925. Schalke's style of play at the time was described by a newspaper of the era as a "wandering ball from man to man" in a series of short, flat passes. The Schalker Kreisel (literally: "Schalke spinning top") was born. Schalke won all three matches played in the years 1925–1927. The two teams did not meet again until the creation of the Gauliga in 1936.

==== Results ====
Schalke: 3 victories, 0 draws, 0 losses

- 3 May 1925: Schalke 4–2 Dortmund (in Herne)
- 24 October 1926: Schalke 2–0 Dortmund
- 16 January 1927: Dortmund 2–7 Schalke

=== 1936–1944: Gauliga era ===
With the creation of the Gauliga in 1936, Dortmund developed its intense rivalry with Schalke. Schalke was the most successful German club of the era, six of the club's to date seven German Championships and one Cup victory date back to the years of 1933 to 1945. Schalke dominated the early meetings, winning 14 matches, and losing only once, with one match played to a draw. August Lenz's goal on 14 November 1943 secured Dortmund's first ever victory against Schalke.

==== Results ====
Schalke: 14 victories, 1 draw, 1 loss

- Season 1936–37
  - 20 December 1936: Schalke 4–1 Dortmund
  - 7 March 1937: Dortmund 0–7 Schalke
- Season 1937–38
  - 30 January 1938: Dortmund 3–3 Schalke
  - 6 March 1938: Schalke 4–0 Dortmund
- Season 1938–39
  - 18 September 1938: Schalke 6–0 Dortmund
  - 12 March 1939: Dortmund 3–7 Schalke
- Season 1939–40
  - 10 December 1939: Schalke 9–0 Dortmund
  - 4 February 1940: Dortmund 0–7 Schalke
- Season 1940–41
  - 20 October 1940: Schalke 10–0 Dortmund
  - 2 February 1941: Dortmund 0–2 Schalke
- Season 1941–42
  - 30 November 1941: Dortmund 1–6 Schalke
  - 22 March 1942: Schalke 6–1 Dortmund
- Season 1942–43
  - 29 November 1942: Schalke 2–0 Dortmund
  - 26 December 1942: Dortmund 0–7 Schalke
- Season 1943–44
  - 14 November 1943: Dortmund 1–0 Schalke
  - 27 February 1944: Schalke 4–1 Dortmund

=== 1945–1947: post-war era ===
Dortmund win the Westphalia championship final 3–2 over Schalke, ending Schalke's domination in the region.

==== Results ====
Dortmund: 1 win, 0 draws, 0 losses

- 18 May 1947: Dortmund 3–2 Schalke (in Herne)

=== 1947–1963: Oberliga era ===
The years 1947–63 continued to be a reversal of fortune for Dortmund, winning 9 of the first 13 Revierderbies during this era, and losing only 7 of 32 overall. Dortmund also won three Oberliga championships in these years.

==== Results ====
Dortmund: 15 wins, 10 draws, 7 losses

- Season 1947–48
  - 21 September 1947: Schalke 1–1 Dortmund
  - 18 January 1948: Dortmund 1–0 Schalke
- Season 1948–49
  - 26 September 1948: Dortmund 5–2 Schalke
  - 30 January 1949: Schalke 0–1 Dortmund
- Season 1949–50
  - 16 October 1949: Dortmund 5–1 Schalke
  - 12 March 1950: Schalke 2–1 Dortmund
- Season 1950–51
  - 26 November 1950: Dortmund 3–0 Schalke
  - 22 April 1951: Schalke 0–0 Dortmund
- Season 1951–52
  - 9 September 1951: Schalke 3–0 Dortmund
  - 20 January 1952: Dortmund 3–0 Schalke
- Season 1952–53
  - 7 December 1952: Schalke 0–1 Dortmund
  - 19 April 1953: Dortmund 1–0 Schalke
- Season 1953–54
  - 29 November 1953: Schalke 0–3 Dortmund
  - 4 April 1954: Dortmund 3–4 Schalke
- Season 1954–55
  - 5 December 1954: Dortmund 0–0 Schalke
  - 17 April 1955: Schalke 0–2 Dortmund
- Season 1955–56
  - 26 November 1955: Schalke 1–3 Dortmund
  - 8 April 1956: Dortmund 0–2 Schalke
- Season 1956–57
  - 25 August 1956: Dortmund 3–2 Schalke
  - 12 January 1957: Schalke 3–3 Dortmund
- Season 1957–58
  - 1 September 1957: Schalke 2–2 Dortmund
  - 5 January 1958: Dortmund 1–1 Schalke
- Season 1958–59
  - 12 October 1958: Dortmund 1–3 Schalke
  - 22 February 1959: Schalke 1–5 Dortmund
- Season 1959–60
  - 20 September 1959: Schalke 5–0 Dortmund
  - 24 January 1960: Dortmund 6–3 Schalke
- Season 1960–61
  - 2 October 1960: Dortmund 0–0 Schalke
  - 5 March 1961: Schalke 2–2 Dortmund
- Season 1961–62
  - 7 April 1962: Schalke 5–3 Dortmund
  - 25 November 1961: Dortmund 2–2 Schalke
- Season 1962–63
  - 2 December 1962: Schalke 1–1 Dortmund
  - 28 April 1963: Dortmund 1–0 Schalke

=== 1963–present: Bundesliga and German Cup era ===
The creation of the Bundesliga in 1963 began with Dortmund continuing their winning ways, by taking 8 of the first 10 meetings.

Schalke's 1–0 victory on 20 April 1968, saw the return of Schalke's fortune and the fall of Dortmund. After Dortmund's 0–3 defeat on 4 March 1972, and subsequent relegation from the league, the teams did not play each other again until 1975.

After Dortmund's return to the Bundesliga, Lothar Huber's goal in the 87th minute on 5 November 1977 gave Dortmund their first victory over Schalke in nearly ten years. The following years belonged to Dortmund, winning eleven matches to Schalke's six, culminating in a 3–2 victory in a German Cup match on 9 December 1988. Schalke's relegation after the 1987–88 season resulted in these teams not playing again until the 1991–92 campaign.

Schalke's next Revierderby was remarkable. With Schalke managing only three goals in their first four matches after returning to the Bundesliga, Dortmund seemed assured of continuing their success. On 24 August 1991, in front of over 70,000 fans, former Dortmund midfielder Ingo Anderbrügge scored in the 2nd minute to put Schalke ahead 1–0. However, Dortmund equalized in the 36th and the 1st half finished with the scored tied 1–1. In the 2nd half, Schalke exploded, stunning Dortmund 5–2. Dortmund's overall success that season eclipsed the defeat, winning the next Revierderby 2–0, and finishing the league in second place that year, tied in points, but losing out to VfB Stuttgart on goal differential.

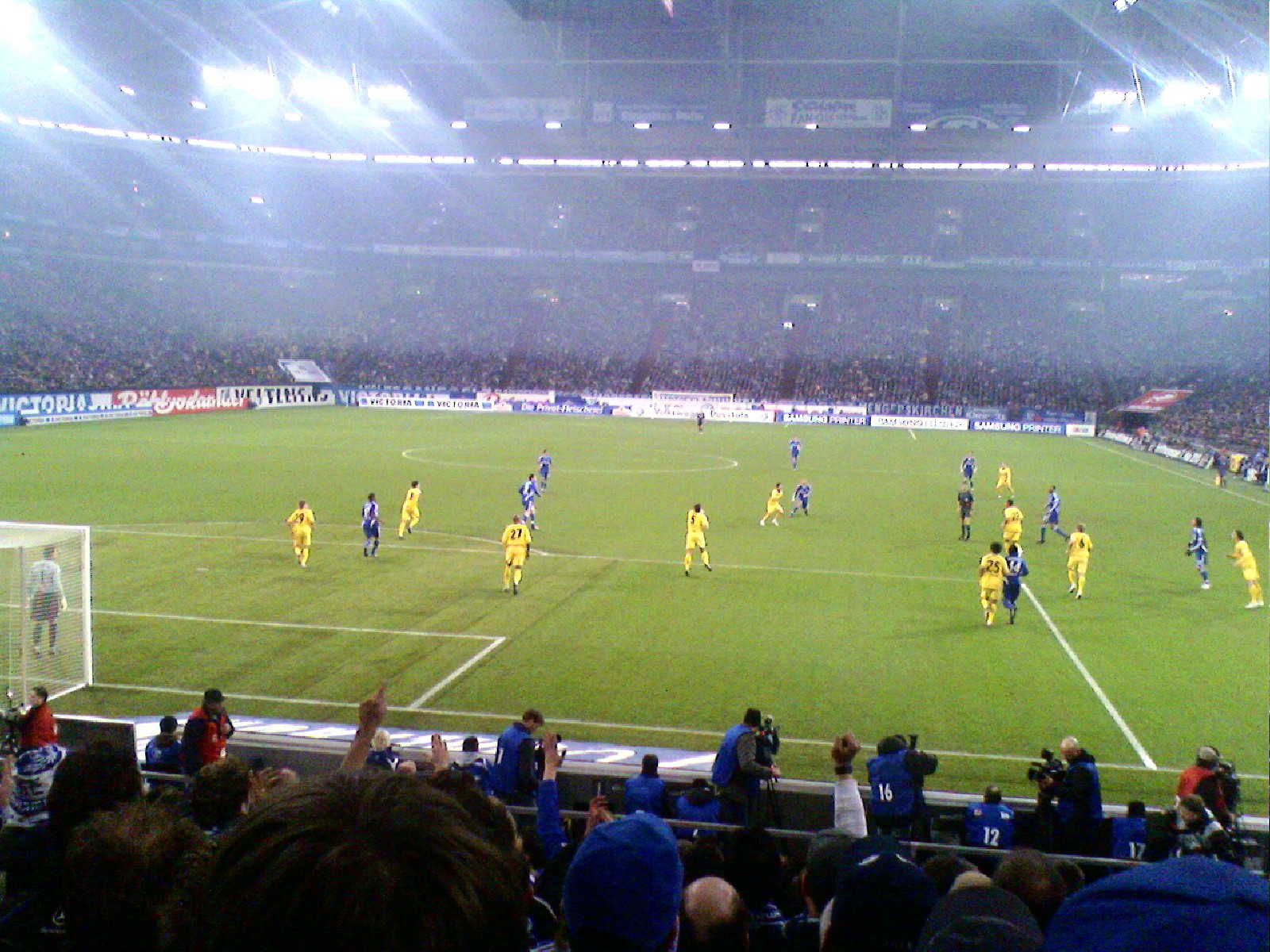
Borussia Dortmund against Schalke in 2009

The following years saw Schalke holding a slim advantage since 1991, winning 11, drawing 14, and losing 8 of the matches. Despite Schalke's recent Revierderby success, including losing only five derbies since 1999 (until 14. April 2012), Dortmund holds the advantage in overall success during this era, winning five Bundesliga championships (1994–95, 1995–96, 2001–02, 2010–11 and 2011–12), one German Cup (2012), one UEFA Champions League competition (1997), and one Intercontinental Cup (1997) since 1995, while Schalke won the UEFA Cup once (1997) and the German Cup three times (2001, 2002 and 2011).

Recent years have seen the first-ever Bundesliga derby aired live on free TV (January 2004, shown on ARD), as well as two famous Dortmund victories. One of these, in 2005, ended a nearly seven-year undefeated streak for Schalke in the derby, while the other, in May 2007, took on almost traumatic proportions, as Schalke lost the derby and the league lead, which they had held for three months, on the penultimate day of the season in Dortmund. After each of these victories, Borussia Dortmund took the unprecedented step of selling specially-decorated replica shirts to commemorate the occasion. In 2008, Dortmund fan groups celebrated Schalke's fifty years without a league title.

==== Results in Bundesliga ====
Overall, Dortmund leads the Bundesliga series with 36 wins, 30 draws, and 32 losses.

Dortmund Win
Schalke Win
Draw

Schalke in Bundesliga at home

Date	Venue	Score	Attend.
7 September 1963	Glückauf-Kampfbahn	3–1	38,000
26 September 1964	Glückauf-Kampfbahn	2–6	40,000
18 September 1965	Glückauf-Kampfbahn	2–3	40,000
29 April 1967	Glückauf-Kampfbahn	1–4	32,000
20 April 1968	Glückauf-Kampfbahn	1–0	38,000
14 September 1968	Glückauf-Kampfbahn	4–1	35,000
31 January 1970	Glückauf-Kampfbahn	1–1	33,000
27 February 1971	Glückauf-Kampfbahn	0–0	30,000
11 September 1971	Glückauf-Kampfbahn	1–0	35,000
21 May 1977	Parkstadion	4–2	70,600
1 April 1978	Parkstadion	0–2	62,000
25 November 1978	Parkstadion	5–1	40,000
21 February 1980	Parkstadion	2–2	50,000
6 September 1982	Parkstadion	1–2	38,000
5 March 1983	Parkstadion	1–2	35,000
1 June 1985	Parkstadion	3–1	42,000
10 December 1985	Parkstadion	6–1	27,000
20 September 1986	Parkstadion	2–1	44,500
26 March 1988	Parkstadion	3–0	32,300
24 August 1991	Parkstadion	5–2	70,200
27 February 1993	Parkstadion	0–0	70,200
15 August 1993	Parkstadion	1–0	65,000
8 April 1995	Parkstadion	0–0	70,925
28 October 1995	Parkstadion	1–2	70,960
2 November 1996	Parkstadion	1–3	71,021
9 August 1997	Parkstadion	1–0	68,200
5 May 1999	Parkstadion	1–1	61,700
15 December 1999	Parkstadion	0–0	52,420
24 February 2001	Parkstadion	0–0	62,109
15 September 2001	Arena AufSchalke	1–0	60,204
22 February 2003	Arena AufSchalke	2–2	60,878
2 August 2003	Arena AufSchalke	2–2	61,014
14 May 2005	Arena AufSchalke	1–2	61,524
4 February 2006	Veltins-Arena	0–0	61,524
10 December 2006	Veltins-Arena	3–1	61,482
18 August 2007	Veltins-Arena	4–1	60,482
20 February 2009	Veltins-Arena	1–1	61,673
26 February 2010	Veltins-Arena	2–1	60,673
19 September 2010	Veltins-Arena	1–3	60,069
14 April 2012	Veltins-Arena	1–2	61,673
9 March 2013	Veltins-Arena	2–1	61,673
26 October 2013	Veltins-Arena	1–3	61,673
27 September 2014	Veltins-Arena	2–1	61,153
10 April 2016	Veltins-Arena	2–2	61,670
1 April 2017	Veltins-Arena	1–1	62,271
15 April 2018	Veltins-Arena	2–0	61,786
8 December 2018	Veltins-Arena	1–2	61,767
26 October 2019	Veltins-Arena	0–0	61,873
20 February 2021	Veltins-Arena	0–4	0 (Note: Match was played behind closed doors due to the COVID-19 pandemic.)
11 March 2023	Veltins-Arena	2–2	61,571

Matches	Schalke wins	Draws	Dortmund wins
50	20	16	14

Dortmund in Bundesliga at home

Date	Venue	Score	Attend.
25 January 1964	Rote Erde	3–0	34,000
13 February 1965	Rote Erde	4–0	33,000
26 February 1966	Rote Erde	7–0	25,000
12 November 1966	Rote Erde	6–2	43,000
5 November 1967	Rote Erde	2–1	27,000
11 March 1969	Rote Erde	0–1	38,000
6 September 1969	Rote Erde	1–1	39,000
12 September 1970	Rote Erde	1–2	40,000
4 March 1972	Rote Erde	0–3	38,000
11 December 1976	Westfalenstadion	2–2	54,000
5 November 1977	Westfalenstadion	2–1	53,700
19 May 1979	Westfalenstadion	2–0	45,000
3 November 1979	Westfalenstadion	2–1	54,000
21 February 1981	Westfalenstadion	2–2	50,000
18 September 1982	Westfalenstadion	2–0	50,000
1 December 1984	Westfalenstadion	4–1	41,000
22 April 1986	Westfalenstadion	1–1	34,000
11 April 1987	Westfalenstadion	1–0	49,000
19 September 1987	Westfalenstadion	4–1	44,000
15 February 1992	Westfalenstadion	2–0	52,800
22 August 1992	Westfalenstadion	0–2	43,000
3 December 1993	Westfalenstadion	1–1	42,400
8 October 1994	Westfalenstadion	3–2	42,800
13 April 1996	Westfalenstadion	0–0	42,400
3 May 1997	Westfalenstadion	1–0	55,000
19 December 1997	Westfalenstadion	2–2	55,000
14 November 1998	Westfalenstadion	3–0	69,000
13 May 2000	Westfalenstadion	1–1	68,600
23 September 2000	Westfalenstadion	0–4	68,600
16 February 2002	Westfalenstadion	1–1	68,600
14 September 2002	Westfalenstadion	1–1	68,600
30 January 2004	Westfalenstadion	0–1	83,000
5 December 2004	Westfalenstadion	0–1	83,000
13 August 2005	Westfalenstadion	1–2	80,708
12 May 2007	Signal Iduna Park	2–0	81,264
10 February 2008	Signal Iduna Park	2–3	80,708
13 September 2008	Signal Iduna Park	3–3	80,552
26 September 2009	Signal Iduna Park	0–1	80,720
4 February 2011	Signal Iduna Park	0–0	80,552
26 November 2011	Signal Iduna Park	2–0	80,720
20 October 2012	Signal Iduna Park	1–2	80,645
25 March 2014	Signal Iduna Park	0–0	77,600
28 February 2015	Signal Iduna Park	3–0	79,500
8 November 2015	Signal Iduna Park	3–2	79,956
29 October 2016	Signal Iduna Park	0–0	80,179
25 November 2017	Signal Iduna Park	4–4	80,179
27 April 2019	Signal Iduna Park	2–4	80,196
16 May 2020	Signal Iduna Park	4–0	0 (Note: Match was played behind closed doors due to the COVID-19 pandemic.)
24 October 2020	Signal Iduna Park	3–0	300 (Note: Match was played with limited attendance due to the COVID-19 pandemic.)
17 September 2022	Signal Iduna Park	1–0	81,100

Matches	Dortmund wins	Draws	Schalke wins
50	23	15	12

==== Results in cup matches ====
Date	Venue	Home team	Score	Competition	Round	Attend.
18 October 1975	Parkstadion	Schalke	2–1	DFB-Pokal	2nd round	65,000
13 October 1984	Westfalenstadion	Dortmund	1–1 ^{(aet)}	DFB-Pokal	2nd round	37,000
31 October 1984	Parkstadion	Schalke	3–2	DFB-Pokal	2nd round replay	45,000
10 December 1988	Parkstadion	Schalke	2–3	DFB-Pokal	Round of 16	47,300
23 September 1998	Westfalenstadion	Dortmund	1–0 ^{(aet)}	DFB-Pokal	2nd round	60,000
29 November 2000	Parkstadion	Schalke	2–1	DFB-Pokal	Round of 16	58,400
17 July 2001	Nattenberg-Stadion	Neutral	2–1	DFB-Ligapokal	Semi-finals	15,300
23 July 2011	Veltins-Arena	Schalke	0–0 ^{(4–3p)}	DFL-Supercup	Final	61,673

== Statistics ==
=== Overall match statistics ===
As of 11 March 2023

Competition	Years	Matches	Wins		Draws	Goals	
Competition	Years	Matches	Schalke	Dortmund	Draws	Schalke	Dortmund
Bundesliga	1963–present	100	32	37	31	139	161
Oberliga West	1947–1963	32	7	15	10	46	63
Gauliga Westfalen	1936–1944	16	14	1	1	84	11
DFB-Pokal	1975–2000	6	3	2	1	10	9
DFL-Supercup	2011	1	0	0	1	0	0
DFL-Ligapokal	2001	1	1	0	0	2	1
Other matches	1925–1927, 1947	4	3	1	0	15	7
Competitive matches		160	60	56	44	296	252
Friendlies	1926–2006	24	11	9	4	46	35
Total		184	71	65	48	342	287

=== Head-to-head ranking in Bundesliga ===
P.	63 64	64 65	65 66	66 67	67 68	68 69	69 70	70 71	71 72	72 73	73 74	74 75	75 76	76 77	77 78	78 79	79 80	80 81	81 82	82 83	83 84	84 85	85 86	86 87	87 88	88 89	89 90	90 91	91 92	92 93	93 94	94 95	95 96	96 97	97 98	98 99	99 00	00 01	01 02	02 03	03 04	04 05	05 06	06 07	07 08	08 09	09 10	10 11	11 12	12 13	13 14	14 15	15 16	16 17	17 18	18 19	19 20	20 21	21 22	22 23	23 24	24 25	25 26
1																																1	1						1									1	1														
2			2						2					2															2									2				2		2			2			2	2		2		2	2	2		2	2			2
3		3		3																													3	3				3		3					3				3		3			3				3					
4	4																							4			4			4	4					4							4							4					4							4	
5							5																												5				5								5						5								5		
6								6					6				6		6																						6					6						6											
7						7					7	7						7		7						7														7	7	7	7									7											
8	8													8			8					8																								8																	
9							9								9																													9																			
10																							10					10		10					10	10																		10									
11															11														11			11					11																										
12																12																		12																							12						
13								13													13			13	13												13								13																		
14			14		14																	14									14																	14								14							
15				15	15					15						15																																															
16		16				16														16			16																																								
17									17									17																																										17			
18																									18																																	18					

• Total: Dortmund with 33 higher finishes, Schalke with 16 (as of end of 2023–24 season).

=== Player records ===
Record	Schalke		Dortmund	
Most overall appearances	Klaus Fichtel	25	Michael Zorc	26
Most Bundesliga appearances	Klaus Fichtel	24	Roman Weidenfeller	24
Most overall goals	Ernst Kuzorra	16	Lothar Emmerich	11
Most Bundesliga goals	Five players (Note: Gerhard Kleppinger, Kevin Kuranyi, Olaf Thon, Klaus Fischer and Klaas-Jan Huntelaar)	5	Lothar Emmerich	10
Most Bundesliga wins	Klaus Fichtel	9	Michael Zorc	10

== Notable matches ==
- First meeting: 3 May 1925 (Schalke 4–2 Dortmund)
- First Schalke victory: 3 May 1925 (Schalke 4–2 Dortmund)
- First match played to a draw: 30 January 1938 (Dortmund 3–3 Schalke)
- Most goals (both teams): 12 March 1939 (Dortmund 3–7 Schalke)
- Most goals for Schalke: 20 October 1940 (Schalke 10–0 Dortmund)
- First Dortmund victory: 14 November 1943 (Dortmund 1–0 Schalke)
- First scoreless match: 22 April 1951 (Schalke 0–0 Dortmund)
- Most goals for Dortmund: 26 February 1966 (Dortmund 7–0 Schalke)
- Schalke's return: 24 August 1991 (Schalke 5–2 Dortmund)
- Lehmann's miracle goal: 19 December 1997 (Dortmund 2–2 Schalke)
- Last minute Dortmund disappointment: 30 January 2004 (Dortmund 0–1 Schalke)
- End of Schalke's streak: 14 May 2005 (Schalke 1–2 Dortmund)
- Schalke's championship dream falls apart: 12 May 2007 (Dortmund 2–0 Schalke)
- Dortmund turns a 0–3 into a 3–3 during the last 21 minutes: 13 September 2008 (Dortmund 3–3 Schalke)
- Schalke turns a 0–4 after 25 minutes into a 4–4: 25 November 2017 (Dortmund 4–4 Schalke)
- Dortmund title hopes dented and incurs 2 red cards: 27 April 2019 (Dortmund 2–4 Schalke)

== Honours ==
Competition	Schalke	Dortmund
Bundesliga (since 1963–64)	0	5
German championship (until 1962–63)	7	3
DFB-Pokal	5	5
DFL-Supercup	1	6
DFL-Ligapokal	1	0
UEFA Champions League	0	1
UEFA Cup Winners' Cup	0	1
UEFA Cup	1	0
Intercontinental Cup	0	1
Total	15	22

== Players who played for both clubs ==
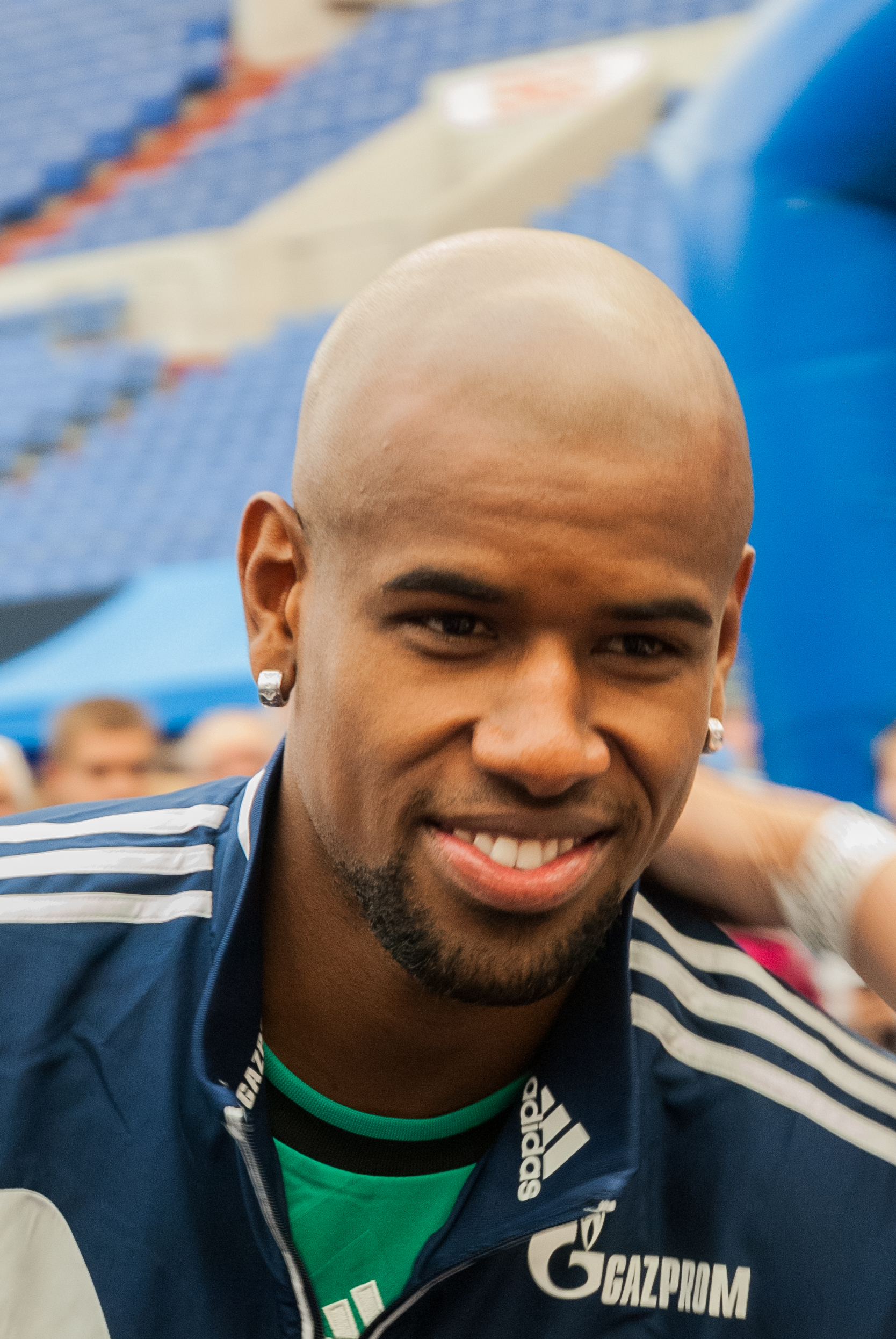
Felipe Santana was the most recent player to transfer directly between the two rivals, in 2013.

Dortmund, then Schalke

- 1977: (Germany) Manfred Ritschel (via Kickers Offenbach, then 1. FC Kaiserslautern)
- 1981: (Germany) Theo Bücker (via MSV Duisburg, then Al-Ittihad)
- 1982: (Germany) Werner Lorant (via Rot-Weiss Essen, 1. FC Saarbrücken and Eintracht Frankfurt)
- 1986: (Germany) Jürgen Wegmann (then back to Dortmund in 1989, after Bayern Munich)
- 1988: (Germany) Ingo Anderbrügge
- 1995: (Germany) Marco Kurz
- 2000: (Germany) Andreas Möller
- 2010: (Germany) Christoph Metzelder (via Real Madrid)
- 2013: (Brazil) Felipe Santana
- 2013: (Ghana) Kevin-Prince Boateng (via Portsmouth, then Milan)

Schalke, then Dortmund

- 1965: (Germany) Reinhard Libuda (then back to Schalke in 1968)
- 1975: (Germany) Gerd Kasperski (via Preußen Münster, Arminia Bielefeld and Hannover 96)
- 1978: (Germany) Peter Endrulat (via SpVgg Erkenschwick)
- 1979: (Germany) Norbert Dörmann
- 1979: (Germany) Paul Holz (via VfL Bochum, Hannover 96 and VfL Bochum again)
- 1980: (Germany) Jürgen Sobieray (via DSC Wanne-Eickel)
- 1980: (Germany) Rüdiger Abramczik (then back to Schalke in 1987, after 1. FC Nürnberg, Galatasaray S.K. and Rot-Weiß Oberhausen)
- 1980: (Germany) Rolf Rüssmann
- 1983: (Germany) Ulrich Bittcher
- 1987: (Germany) Gerhard Kleppinger
- 1993: (Germany) Steffen Freund
- 1995: (Germany) Harald Schumacher (via Fenerbahçe, then Bayern Munich)
- 1999: (Germany) Jens Lehmann (via Milan)
- 2008: (Hungary) Tamás Hajnal (via Sint-Truidense, 1. FC Kaiserslautern and Karlsruher SC)

From Dortmund to Schalke	5
From Dortmund to another club before Schalke	5
Total	10
From Schalke to Dortmund	7
From Schalke to another club before Dortmund	7
Total	14
Total switches	24

== Other revierderbies ==
Match statistics in Bundesliga (as of end of 2024–25 season)

	VfL Bochum				MSV Duisburg				RW Essen				RW Oberhausen				Wattenscheid 09			
	Pld	W	D	L	Pld	W	D	L	Pld	W	D	L	Pld	W	D	L	Pld	W	D	L
Schalke 04	60	34	11	15	54	20	12	22	14	8	5	1	8	5	1	2	6	2	2	2
Borussia Dortmund	68	27	23	18	48	24	13	11	8	5	3	0	6	4	1	1	8	5	3	0
