= Josef Pirrung =

German footballer

Personal information
- Date of birth: 24 July 1949
- Place of birth: Münchweiler an der Rodalb, West Germany
- Date of death: 11 February 2011 (aged 61)
- Height: 1.70 m (5 ft 7 in)
- Positions: Striker; midfielder

Senior career*
Years	Team	Apps	(Gls)
1967–1981	1. FC Kaiserslautern	304	(61)
1981–1982	Wormatia Worms	26	(1)

International career
1974	West Germany	2	(0)
- * Club domestic league appearances and goals

Josef Pirrung (24 July 1949 – 11 February 2011) was a German football player.

== Club career ==
He spent twelve seasons in the Bundesliga with 1. FC Kaiserslautern.

== International career ==
Pirrung represented Germany in two UEFA Euro 1976 qualifiers against Greece and Malta.

== Honours ==
- DFB-Pokal finalist: 1971–72, 1975–76, 1980–81
