= Heinz Ludewig =

German footballer

Personal information
- Date of birth: 24 December 1889
- Date of death: 16 May 1950 (aged 60)
- Position: Midfielder

Senior career*
Years	Team	Apps	(Gls)
- Duisburger SV

International career
1914	Germany	1	(0)
- * Club domestic league appearances and goals

Heinz Ludewig (24 December 1889 – 16 May 1950) was a German international footballer.
