= Hans-Jürgen Becher =

German footballer (1941–2026)

Personal information
- Date of birth: 21 September 1941
- Place of birth: Gelsenkirchen, Gau Westphalia-North, Germany
- Date of death: 13 April 2026 (aged 84)
- Height: 1.82 m (6 ft 0 in)
- Position: Defender

Youth career
- 1956–1960: Schalke 04

Senior career*
Years	Team	Apps	(Gls)
1960–1971	Schalke 04	233	(4)
1971–1974	Eintracht Gelsenkirchen	70	(0)
- * Club domestic league appearances and goals

Hans-Jürgen Becher (21 September 1941 – 13 April 2026) was a German footballer who played as a defender. He completed 32 matches in the Oberliga West and made 201 appearances in the Bundesliga for Schalke 04.

Becher died on 13 April 2026, at the age of 84.
