= Hartmut Huhse =

German association football player

Personal information
- Date of birth: 22 August 1952 (age 73)
- Place of birth: Greifswald, East Germany
- Height: 1.79 m (5 ft 10 in)
- Position: Defender

Senior career*
Years	Team	Apps	(Gls)
1971–1975	Schalke 04	113	(1)
1975–1979	Rot-Weiss Essen	118	(5)
1979	Rochester Lancers	11	(2)
1980–1982	FC Fribourg		
- * Club domestic league appearances and goals

Hartmut Huhse (born 22 August 1952) is a retired German footballer who played as a defender. He played in the Bundesliga for Schalke 04 and Rot-Weiss Essen. In 1972, he won the DFB-Pokal with Schalke.
