= Norbert Nigbur =

German footballer (born 1948)

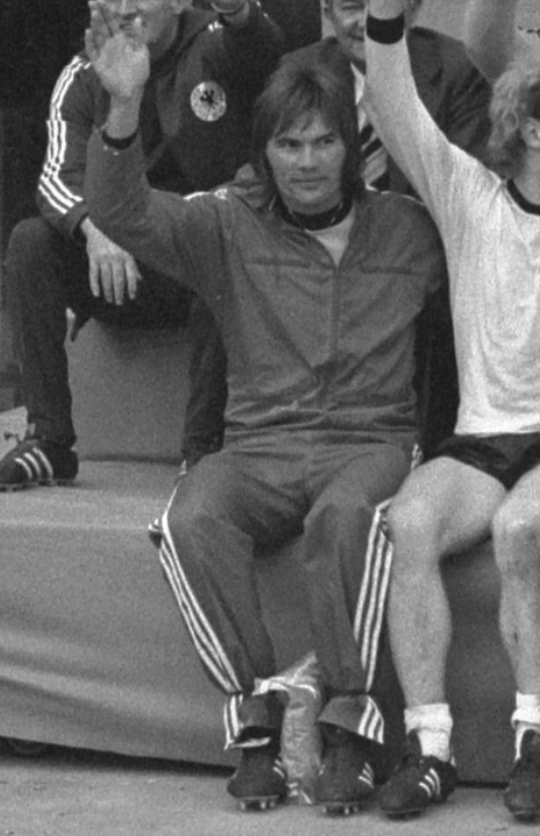
- Nigbur in 1974

Personal information
- Date of birth: 8 May 1948 (age 78)
- Place of birth: Gelsenkirchen, Germany
- Height: 1.85 m (6 ft 1 in)
- Position: Goalkeeper

Youth career
- SV Gelsenkirchen 06

Senior career*
Years	Team	Apps	(Gls)
1966–1976	Schalke 04	289	(0)
1976–1979	Hertha BSC	101	(0)
1979–1983	Schalke 04	104	(0)
1983–1984	VfB Hüls		(0)
1984–1985	Rot-Weiss Essen	27	(0)

International career
1966–1973	West Germany U23	4	(0)
1975–1981	West Germany B	5	(0)
1974–1980	West Germany	6	(0)
Medal record
Men's football
Representing West Germany
FIFA World Cup
Winner	1974 West Germany
- * Club domestic league appearances and goals

Norbert Nigbur (born 8 May 1948) is a German former professional footballer who played as a goalkeeper, most notably for Schalke 04. He made six appearances for the West Germany national team.

== Career ==
Nigbur was born in Gelsenkirchen, Germany. He joined Gelsenkirchen's biggest club, Schalke 04, from SV Gelsenkirchen 06 in 1966, playing 456 matches in the Bundesliga for Schalke and Hertha BSC in between 1966 and 1983, being the first first-team player from Schalke joining the club from Berlin after the Bundesligaskandal in 1970–71. His biggest success on club level was the DFB-Pokal trophy with hometown side Schalke 04 in 1972. In the 1980s and after the end of his last Schalke contract, Nigbur played for teams as VfB Hüls, Rot-Weiss Essen and FC Luthenberg outside the top two German divisions.

He was capped on six occasions by West Germany, and was a member of the West German squad at the 1974 FIFA World Cup.

== Career statistics ==
Appearances and goals by club, season and competition
Club	Season	League			DFB-Pokal		Europe		DFL-Ligapokal		Total	
Club	Season	League	Apps	Goals	Apps	Goals	Apps	Goals	Apps	Goals	Apps	Goals
Schalke 04	1966–67	Bundesliga	28	0	3	0	—		—		31	0
Schalke 04	1967–68	Bundesliga	18	0	1	0	—		—		19	0
Schalke 04	1968–69	Bundesliga	31	0	5	0	—		—		36	0
Schalke 04	1969–70	Bundesliga	23	0	3	0	6	0	—		32	0
Schalke 04	1970–71	Bundesliga	31	0	2	0	—		—		33	0
Schalke 04	1971–72	Bundesliga	34	0	9	0	—		—		43	0
Schalke 04	1972–73	Bundesliga	34	0	3	0	6	0	9	0	52	0
Schalke 04	1973–74	Bundesliga	24	0	1	0	—		—		25	0
Schalke 04	1974–75	Bundesliga	33	0	3	0	—		—		36	0
Schalke 04	1975–76	Bundesliga	33	0	2	0	—		—		35	0
Schalke 04	Total		289	0	32	0	12	0	9	0	342	0
Hertha BSC	1976–77	Bundesliga	33	0	7	0	—		—		40	0
Hertha BSC	1977–78	Bundesliga	34	0	6	0	—		—		40	0
Hertha BSC	1978–79	Bundesliga	34	0	8	0	10	0	—		52	0
Hertha BSC	Total		101	0	21	0	10	0	—		132	0
Schalke 04	1979–80	Bundesliga	28	0	5	0	—		—		33	0
Schalke 04	1980–81	Bundesliga	27	0	1	0	—		—		28	0
Schalke 04	1981–82	2. Bundesliga	38	0	1	0	—		—		39	0
Schalke 04	1982–83	Bundesliga	11	0	2	0	—		—		13	0
Schalke 04	Total		104	0	9	0	—		—		113	0
Career total			494	0	62	0	22	0	9	0	587	0

== Honours ==
- FIFA World Cup: 1974
- DFB-Pokal: 1972
