= Ulrich Bittcher =

German association football player

Uli Bittcher
Personal information
- Full name: Ulrich Bittcher
- Date of birth: 10 September 1957 (age 69)
- Place of birth: Gelsenkirchen, West Germany
- Height: 1.78 m (5 ft 10 in)
- Position: Midfielder

Youth career
- 1975–1976: Schalke 04

Senior career*
Years	Team	Apps	(Gls)
1976–1983	Schalke 04	206	(29)
1983–1987	Borussia Dortmund	84	(3)

International career
1977–1981	West Germany B	7	(0)
- * Club domestic league appearances and goals

Ulrich "Uli" Bittcher (born 10 September 1957) is a retired German footballer who played as a midfielder. He made 252 appearances in the Bundesliga for Schalke 04 and Borussia Dortmund and played 38 matches in the 2. Bundesliga for Schalke.
