= Erwin Kremers =

German footballer (born 1949)

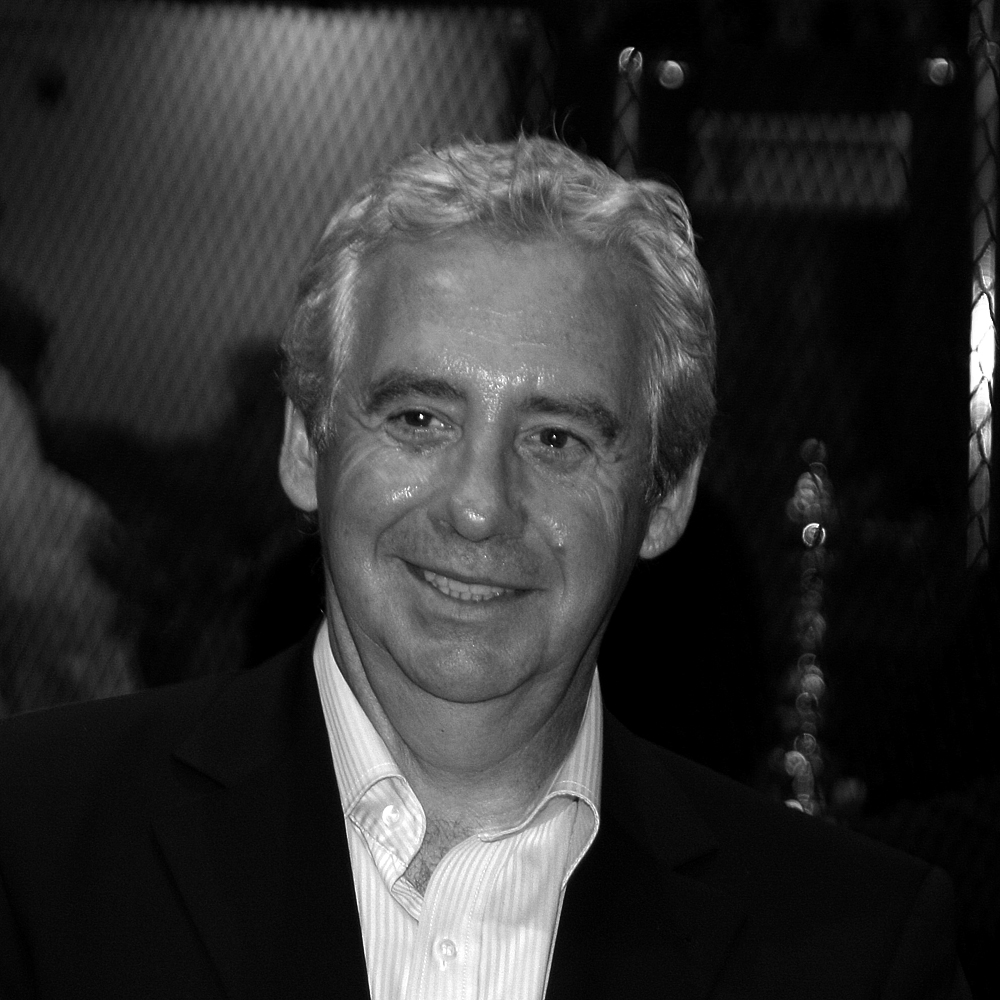
- Kremers in 2009

Personal information
- Date of birth: 24 March 1949 (age 77)
- Place of birth: Mönchengladbach, Germany
- Height: 1.72 m (5 ft 8 in)
- Position: Striker

Youth career
- Borussia Mönchengladbach

Senior career*
Years	Team	Apps	(Gls)
1967–1969	Borussia Mönchengladbach	24	(1)
1969–1971	Kickers Offenbach	57	(18)
1971–1979	Schalke 04	212	(50)
Total		293	(69)

International career
1972–1974	West Germany	15	(3)
Medal record
Representing West Germany
UEFA European Championship
Winner	1972 Belgium
- * Club domestic league appearances and goals

Erwin Kremers (born 24 March 1949) is a German former professional footballer who played as a striker. His twin brother, Helmut Kremers, was also a footballer, and the two brothers were club teammates throughout Kremers' playing career. They are the first ever twins to play in the Bundesliga.

== Career ==
Kremers began his football career as a youth player, along with his brother, at Borussia Mönchengladbach, before eventually going on to make over 20 appearances for the first team in the Bundesliga. After two years at the club, he (and his brother) moved on to Kickers Offenbach, where he had an impressive strike record with 10 goals in just 25 starts. In the summer of 1971, he and his brother both moved to Schalke 04, and it was in the following year that he got his call up to the Germany national team. Kremers went on to play 15 times for his country, scoring a total of three goals. He was a member of the squad that won UEFA Euro 1972.
