= Hans Schmidt (footballer, born 1893) =

German footballer and manager

Personal information
- Date of birth: 23 December 1893
- Date of death: 31 January 1971 (aged 77)
- Position: Midfielder

Senior career*
Years	Team	Apps	(Gls)
1911–1919	SpVgg Fürth		
1919–1922	TV 1860 Fürth		
1922–1928	1. FC Nürnberg		
1928–1929	ASN Nürnberg		

International career
1913–1926	Germany	16	(0)

Managerial career
- 1931–1933: Schwarz-Weiß Essen
- 1933–1938: FC Schalke 04
- 1942–1945: 1. FC Nürnberg
- 1945–1950: VfR Mannheim
- 1950–1951: 1. FC Nürnberg
- 1951–1955: Borussia Dortmund
- 1955–1957: SpVgg Fürth
- * Club domestic league appearances and goals

Hans Schmidt (23 December 1893 – 31 January 1971) was a German international footballer and manager.

== Club career ==
As a player, he won the German football championship on four occasions, three of which he won with 1. FC Nürnberg.

== International career ==
In 1913, he made his debut for the Germany national team at the age of 19 in a 2–1 defeat against Switzerland. He was capped 16 times for his country.

== Managerial career ==
In 1933 he joined Schalke 04, leading the club to its first ever German football championship victory a year later. He went on to win two further championships with the club in 1935 and 1937. The club also won the 1937 Tschammerpokal, becoming the first German club to do the double.

== Honours ==
As a player:

- German football championship – 1914, 1924, 1925, 1927

As a manager:

- German football championship – 1934, 1935, 1937, 1949
- Tschammerpokal – 1937
