= Eduard Frühwirth =

Austrian footballer and manager

Personal information
- Date of birth: 17 November 1908
- Place of birth: Vienna, Austria-Hungary
- Date of death: 27 February 1973 (aged 64)
- Position: Striker

Senior career*
Years	Team	Apps	(Gls)
1927–1928	Rapid Wien	1	(0)
1930–1931	Wiener AC		
1931–1934	Elektra Wien		
1934–1936	FC Libertas Wien		
1936–1940	Floridsdorfer AC		

Managerial career
- 1939–1947: Floridsdorfer AC
- 1947–1954: SC Wacker Vienna
- 1948: Austria
- 1954–1959: Schalke 04
- 1959–1962: Karlsruher SC
- 1962–1964: Austria Wien
- 1964–1967: Austria
- 1967–1969: Viktoria Köln
- 1970–1971: WSG Wattens
- * Club domestic league appearances and goals

Eduard "Edi" Frühwirth (17 November 1908 – 27 February 1973) was an Austrian football player and manager.
