= Klaus Fichtel =

German footballer (born 1944)

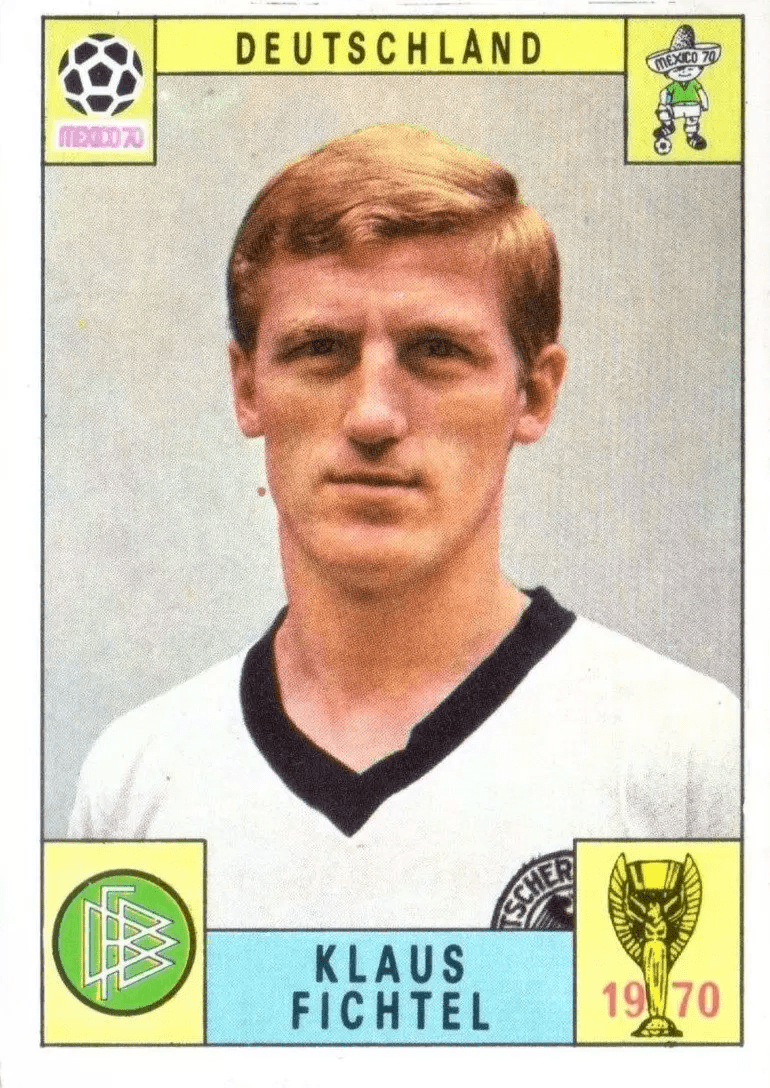
- Fichtel at the 1970 FIFA World Cup

Personal information
- Date of birth: 19 November 1944 (age 81)
- Place of birth: Castrop-Rauxel, Germany
- Height: 1.76 m (5 ft 9 in)
- Positions: Defender; sweeper

Youth career
- –1965: Arminia Ickern

Senior career*
Years	Team	Apps	(Gls)
1965–1980	Schalke 04	437	(14)
1980–1984	Werder Bremen	117	(0)
1984–1988	Schalke 04	40	(0)
Total		594	(14)

International career
1967–1971	West Germany	23	(1)
Medal record
Men's football
Representing West Germany
FIFA World Cup
Third place	1970 Mexico
- * Club domestic league appearances and goals

Klaus Fichtel (born 19 November 1944) is a German former professional footballer who played as a defender for Schalke 04 and Werder Bremen. He made 23 appearances for the West Germany national team.

== Career ==
Fichtel was born in Castrop-Rauxel, Province of Westphalia He began his career with FC Schalke 04 and after four years with SV Werder Bremen he returned to Schalke. In total he played 552 games (14 goals) in the Bundesliga. In addition, he played 42 times in the 2. Bundesliga in one of his four years with SV Werder Bremen.

Fichtel is the oldest player to appear in the Bundesliga, playing his last match at the age of 43 and a half years in May 1988. His 477 Bundesliga matches for Schalke 04 remain a club record.

Fichtel won 23 caps in four years with West Germany in between 1967 and 1971, scoring one goal against Scotland in 1969. He was part of the West German squad at the 1970 FIFA World Cup, playing in five matches during the tournament.

== Career statistics ==
Appearances and goals by club, season and competition
Club	Season	League			DFB-Pokal		Europe		DFL-Ligapokal		Total	
Club	Season	League	Apps	Goals	Apps	Goals	Apps	Goals	Apps	Goals	Apps	Goals
Schalke 04	1965–66	Bundesliga	34	0	2	0	—		—		36	0
Schalke 04	1966–67	Bundesliga	34	0	3	0	—		—		37	0
Schalke 04	1967–68	Bundesliga	34	0	2	0	—		—		36	0
Schalke 04	1968–69	Bundesliga	29	0	5	0	—		—		34	0
Schalke 04	1969–70	Bundesliga	32	1	3	0	8	1	—		43	2
Schalke 04	1970–71	Bundesliga	29	1	5	0	—		—		34	1
Schalke 04	1971–72	Bundesliga	33	3	7	0	—		—		40	3
Schalke 04	1972–73	Bundesliga	18	1	3	0	6	0	7	0	34	1
Schalke 04	1973–74	Bundesliga	14	1	0	0	—		—		14	1
Schalke 04	1974–75	Bundesliga	29	1	2	0	—		—		31	1
Schalke 04	1975–76	Bundesliga	32	4	3	0	—		—		35	4
Schalke 04	1976–77	Bundesliga	34	0	5	1	6	1	—		45	2
Schalke 04	1977–78	Bundesliga	22	0	4	0	0	0	—		26	0
Schalke 04	1978–79	Bundesliga	34	2	3	0	—		—		37	2
Schalke 04	1979–80	Bundesliga	29	0	5	0	—		—		34	0
Schalke 04	Total		437	14	52	1	20	2	7	0	516	17
Werder Bremen	1980–81	2. Bundesliga	42	0	5	1	—		—		47	1
Werder Bremen	1981–82	Bundesliga	34	0	5	0	—		—		39	0
Werder Bremen	1982–83	Bundesliga	33	0	2	0	6	0	—		41	0
Werder Bremen	1983–84	Bundesliga	8	0	2	0	0	0	—		10	0
Werder Bremen	Total		117	0	14	1	6	0	—		137	1
Schalke 04	1984–85	Bundesliga	13	0	0	0	—		—		13	0
Schalke 04	1985–86	Bundesliga	13	0	0	0	—		—		13	0
Schalke 04	1986–87	Bundesliga	3	0	0	0	—		—		3	0
Schalke 04	1987–88	Bundesliga	11	0	0	0	—		—		11	0
Schalke 04	Total		40	0	0	0	—		—		40	0
Career total			594	14	66	2	26	2	7	0	693	18
