= Klaus Scheer =

German footballer and manager

Personal information
- Date of birth: October 4, 1950 (age 76)
- Place of birth: Siegen, West Germany
- Position: Forward

Senior career*
Years	Team	Apps	(Gls)
–1969	Sportfreunde Siegen		
1969–1975	FC Schalke 04	165	(38)
1975–1977	1. FC Kaiserslautern	41	(0)
1977–1979	SC Westfalia Herne	49	(9)

Managerial career
- 1991–1992: Sportfreunde Siegen
- 1992–1995: SG Daaden
- 1995–1997: 1. FC Saarbrücken
- 1998: FC Remscheid
- 1999–2000: SC Austria Lustenau
- 2001–2002: 1. FC Eschborn
- 2003–2004: Borussia Fulda
- 2004–2006: 1. FC Eschborn
- 2007–2010: SpVgg Bayreuth
- 2010–2011: 1.FC Schweinfurt 05
- 2012: SpVgg Bayreuth
- * Club domestic league appearances and goals

Klaus Scheer (born October 4, 1950) is a German football manager and former footballer.
