= Helmut Kremers =

German footballer (born 1949)

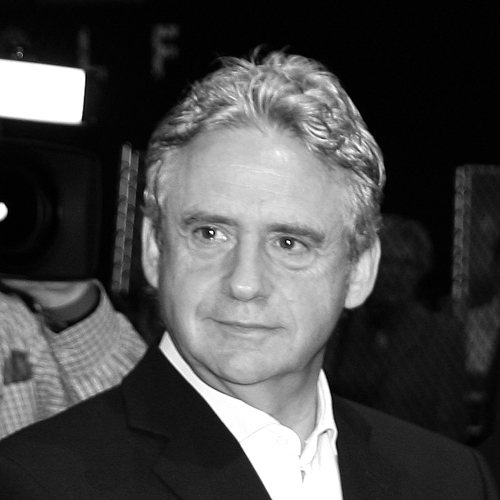
- Kremers in 2009

Personal information
- Date of birth: 24 March 1949 (age 77)
- Place of birth: Mönchengladbach, Germany
- Height: 1.72 m (5 ft 8 in)
- Position: Full-back

Youth career
- Borussia Mönchengladbach

Senior career*
Years	Team	Apps	(Gls)
1967–1969	Borussia Mönchengladbach	14	(1)
1969–1971	Kickers Offenbach	65	(9)
1971–1980	Schalke 04	226	(45)
1980–1981	Rot-Weiss Essen	18	(4)
1981	Calgary Boomers	31	(3)
1981–1982	Memphis Americans (indoor)	14	(13)
Total		368	(75)

International career
1973–1975	West Germany	8	(0)

Managerial career
- 1989: Schalke 04 (caretaker)
Medal record
Men's football
Representing West Germany
FIFA World Cup
Winner	1974 West Germany
- * Club domestic league appearances and goals

Helmut Kremers (born 24 March 1949) is a German former professional footballer who played as a full-back. His twin brother, Erwin Kremers, also played as a German international with the two brothers playing with each other regularly. Helmut and Erwin Kremers are the first ever twins to play in the Bundesliga.

== Club career ==
Moving up to the Bundesliga squad of Borussia Mönchengladbach in 1967, Helmut Kremers won his first of two DFB-Pokal trophies with then lower league side Kickers Offenbach in 1970. In 1972, he had joined FC Schalke 04 together with his twin brother Erwin in 1971, he was able to lift the trophy for a second time. Unlike his twin brother, who played winger, full back Helmut had spells with other clubs after the end of his deal with Schalke, playing for Rot-Weiss Essen in the 1980–81 2. Bundesliga and for North American Soccer League team Calgary Boomers in 1981. In total, Kremers scored 50 goals in 273 Bundesliga appearances. Together, the twin brothers made three appearances in the national team: 1973 in Hanover against Austria (4-0) and in Gelsenkirchen against France (2-1) and in 1974 against Hungary in a 5-0 win in Dortmund. In 1974 he became FIFA World Cup champion with Germany in his own country but was never used. Nevertheless, like all members of the squad of the German World Cup team, he received the Silver Laurel Leaf on 23 September 1974. In the fall of 1981, he joined the Memphis Americans of the Major Indoor Soccer League for one season. In 1982/83 he put on his football boots again as player-coach of SV 08 Kuppenheim in the Oberliga Baden-Württemberg and succeeded Heinz Stickel in this office.

== International career ==
Kremers played in eight games for his country, the last time on 12 March 1975, in a friendly defeat at the hands of England. Although playing on less occasions for West Germany than his twin brother (who won 15 caps), Kremers was part of the 1974 FIFA World Cup winning squad. Erwin Kremers missed out on that due to a disciplinary decision taken beforehand.

== Honours ==
- DFB-Pokal winner 1970 with Kickers Offenbach
- DFB-Pokal winner 1972 with FC Schalke 04
- FIFA World Cup Champion 1974 (without action)

== After career ==
Kremers was FC Schalke 04 manager three times between 1989 and 1993, interim coach in 1989 and from 12 September to 6 December 1994 the last president to date. The sentence he said at the general meeting became legendary: “When we used to play against Dortmund, we didn’t even change our clothes.” After his term of office, the presidency was replaced by a change in the statutes by a board appointed by the supervisory board, which was then headed by Gerhard Rehberg. In December 2011 he ran for the office of President of MSV Duisburg but was not elected.

Today Kremers is managing director of a GmbH for project development in Duisburg, which he founded in 1992.

== Miscellaneous ==
Kremers completed an apprenticeship as a wholesale merchant. In a portrait in May 1974, he was described as a "reasonable person", as a "pragmatist", "more Hanseatic cool than Rhenish cheerful nature" and as a person "between naturalness and well-concealed arrogance". Together with his twin brother Erwin, he reached 44th place in the German hit parade in 1974 as "Die Kremers" with the title The Girl of My Dreams. The two Kremers brothers lived under the same roof with their families during their careers, and they also owned a discotheque together. During his career, Helmut Kremers spoke out in favour of the abolition of transfer fees when changing clubs, since this was "a kind of human trafficking".

== Literature ==
- Christian Karn, Reinhard Rehberg: Encyclopedia of German League Football. Player Encyclopedia 1963–1994. AGON Sportverlag, Kassel 2012. ISBN 978-3-89784-214-4, page 279.
- Fritz Tauber: German national football player. Player statistics from A to Z. AGON Sportverlag, Kassel 2012, ISBN 978-3-89784-397-4, page 69.
