= Klaus Fischer =

German footballer and manager (born 1949)

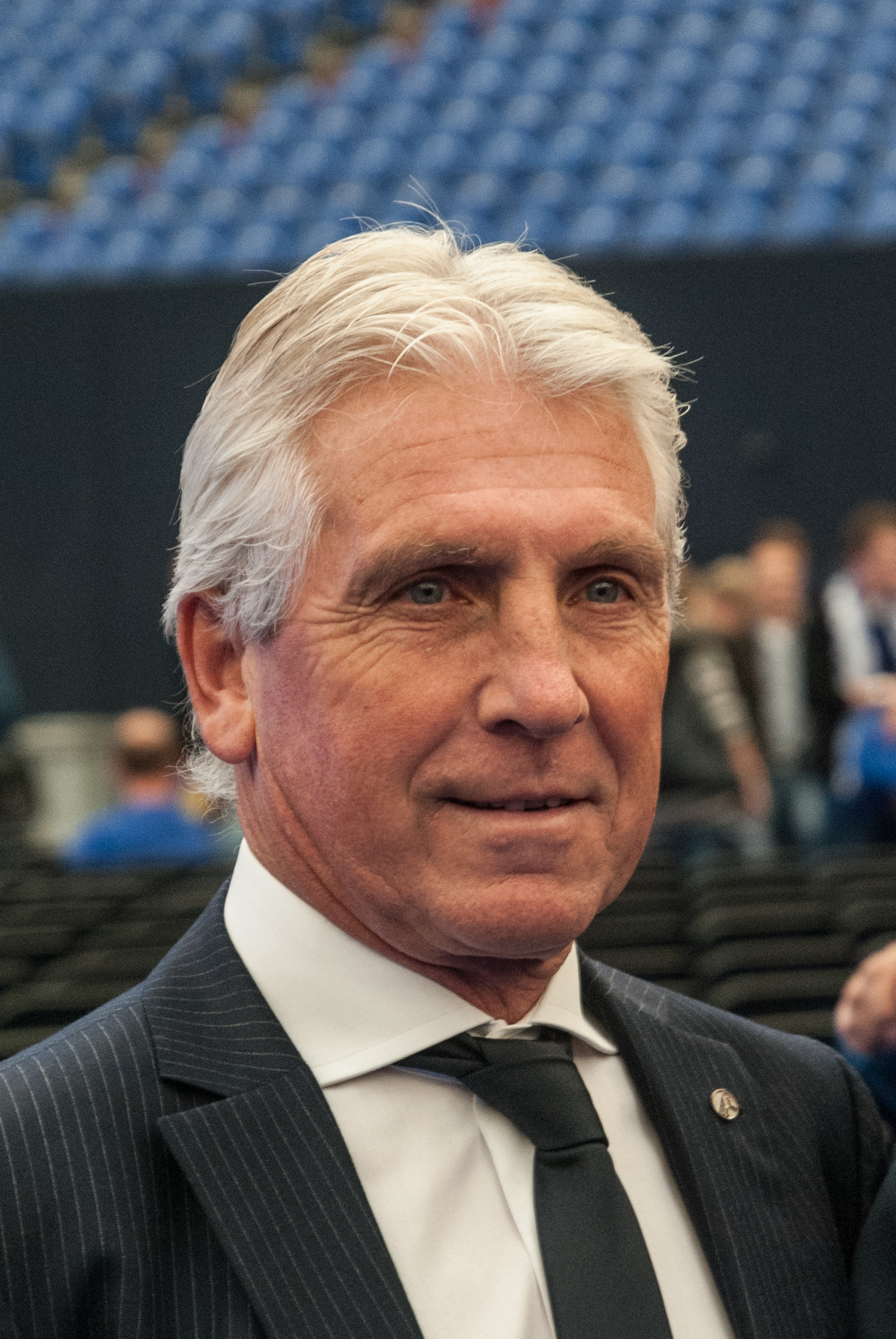
- Fischer in 2013

Personal information
- Date of birth: 27 December 1949 (age 76)
- Place of birth: Kreuzstraßl, West Germany
- Height: 1.78 m (5 ft 10 in)
- Position: Forward

Youth career
- 1958–1961: SC Kreuzstraßl
- 1961–1968: SC Zwiesel

Senior career*
Years	Team	Apps	(Gls)
1968–1970	1860 Munich	60	(28)
1970–1981	Schalke 04	295	(182)
1981–1984	1. FC Köln	96	(31)
1984–1988	VfL Bochum	84	(27)
Total		535	(268)

International career
1971	West Germany U-23	2	(2)
1977–1982	West Germany	45	(32)

Managerial career
- 1988–1989: VfL Bochum (assistant)
- 1989–1992: Schalke 04 (assistant)
- 1990: → Schalke 04 (interim)
- 1992: → Schalke 04 (interim)
- 1992–1995: Schalke 04 II
- * Club domestic league appearances and goals

Klaus Fischer (born 27 December 1949) is a German former professional footballer and coach. He was a key player on the West Germany national team that lost the 1982 World Cup final to Italy. As a forward, he was noted for his bicycle kicks, and scored a spectacular overhead kick equalizer in extra-time of a 1982 World Cup semi-final against France.

== Club career ==
Fischer was born in Kreuzstraßl, near Lindberg (Bayerischer Wald) in the district of Regen.

He moved from SC Zwiesel to TSV 1860 Munich in 1968 and made 535 Bundesliga appearances for 1860 Munich, FC Schalke 04, 1. FC Köln and VfL Bochum. With Schalke 04 he won the German Cup in 1972. Schalke 04 were one of the clubs involved in a bribery scandal in season 1970–71 of the Bundesliga. As one of the players involved, Fischer initially received a ban for life, but this punishment was later reduced to a one-year league ban and a five-year ban from national team eligibility.

In 1976, he was top scorer in the Bundesliga. With 268 goals he ranks third to Gerd Müller and Robert Lewandowski on the list of all-time top Bundesliga goalscorers. In 1988 Fischer's club side VfL Bochum made it to the German Cup final, but Fischer did not feature in the final match. He ended his career in 1988.

His 182 league goals for Schalke 04 remain a club record.

== International career ==
Fischer made 45 appearances for the West Germany national team from 1977 to 1982, scoring 32 goals (eight headers and 24 with his feet, including two bicycle kicks). He appeared in two World Cups and was a World Cup runner-up in Spain in 1982.

Fischer was known particularly for his bicycle kicks, often set up for him by Rüdiger Abramczik. His goal from a bicycle kick in a 4–1 win in a 1977 international match against Switzerland was selected as the Goal of the Year by German television viewers. It was later voted Goal of the Decade and Goal of the Century. He also scored a famous bicycle kick equalizer in extra time in a 1982 World Cup semi-final against France, which West Germany went on to win on penalties.

== Coaching career ==
Fischer runs a football training school.

== Career statistics ==
=== Club ===
Appearances and goals by club, season and competition
Club	Season	League			Cup		Europe		League Cup		Total	
Club	Season	League	Apps	Goals	Apps	Goals	Apps	Goals	Apps	Goals	Apps	Goals
1860 Munich	1968–69	Bundesliga	26	9	1	0	2	0	—		29	9
1860 Munich	1969–70	Bundesliga	34	19	0	0	2	2	—		36	21
1860 Munich	Total		60	28	1	0	4	2	—		65	30
Schalke 04	1969–70	Bundesliga	0	0	2	0	—		—		2	0
Schalke 04	1970–71	Bundesliga	34	15	5	1	—		—		39	16
Schalke 04	1971–72	Bundesliga	29	22	9	7	—		—		38	29
Schalke 04	1972–73	Bundesliga	0	0	0	0	1	1	6	3	7	4
Schalke 04	1973–74	Bundesliga	25	21	1	1	—		—		26	22
Schalke 04	1974–75	Bundesliga	33	17	3	3	—		—		36	20
Schalke 04	1975–76	Bundesliga	34	29	3	3	—		—		37	32
Schalke 04	1976–77	Bundesliga	31	24	3	4	5	6	—		39	34
Schalke 04	1977–78	Bundesliga	32	20	6	7	3	0	—		41	27
Schalke 04	1978–79	Bundesliga	34	21	3	4	—		—		37	25
Schalke 04	1979–80	Bundesliga	26	7	4	4	—		—		30	11
Schalke 04	1980–81	Bundesliga	17	6	0	0	—		—		17	6
Schalke 04	Total		295	182	39	34	9	7	6	3	349	226
1. FC Köln	1981–82	Bundesliga	31	7	1	0	—		—		32	7
1. FC Köln	1982–83	Bundesliga	32	12	6	5	5	3	—		43	20
1. FC Köln	1983–84	Bundesliga	33	12	3	5	4	2	—		40	19
1. FC Köln	Total		96	31	10	10	9	5	—		115	46
VfL Bochum	1984–85	Bundesliga	34	16	3	0	—		—		37	16
VfL Bochum	1985–86	Bundesliga	27	8	4	0	—		—		31	8
VfL Bochum	1986–87	Bundesliga	11	3	0	0	—		—		11	3
VfL Bochum	1987–88	Bundesliga	12	0	3	2	—		—		15	2
VfL Bochum	Total		84	27	10	2	—		—		94	29
Career total			535	268	60	46	22	14	6	3	623	331

=== International ===
Appearances and goals by national team and year
National team	Year	Apps	Goals
West Germany	1977	9	11
West Germany	1978	11	1
West Germany	1979	6	5
West Germany	1980	1	2
West Germany	1981	8	9
West Germany	1982	10	4
Total		45	32

=== International goals ===
No.	Date	Venue	Opponent	Score	Result	Competition
1.	27 April 1977	Müngersdorfer Stadion, Cologne, West Germany	Northern Ireland	2–0	5–0	Friendly
2.	27 April 1977	Müngersdorfer Stadion, Cologne, West Germany	Northern Ireland	4–0	5–0	Friendly
3.	5 June 1977	La Bombonera, Buenos Aires, Argentina	Argentina	1–0	3–1	Friendly
4.	5 June 1977	La Bombonera, Buenos Aires, Argentina	Argentina	2–0	3–1	Friendly
5.	12 June 1977	Maracanã Stadium, Rio de Janeiro, Brazil	Brazil	1–0	1–1	Friendly
6.	14 June 1977	Azteca Stadium, Mexico City, Mexico	Mexico	1–2	2–2	Friendly
7.	14 June 1977	Azteca Stadium, Mexico City, Mexico	Mexico	2–2	2–2	Friendly
8.	7 September 1977	Helsinki Olympic Stadium, Helsinki, Finland	Finland	1–0	1–0	Friendly
9.	16 November 1977	Neckarstadion, Stuttgart, West Germany	Switzerland	3–0	4–1	Friendly
10.	16 November 1977	Neckarstadion, Stuttgart, West Germany	Switzerland	4–1	4–1	Friendly
11.	14 December 1977	Westfalenstadion, Dortmund, West Germany	Wales	1–0	1–1	Friendly
12.	20 December 1978	Rheinstadion, Düsseldorf, West Germany	Netherlands	2–0	3–1	Friendly
13.	2 May 1979	Racecourse Ground, Wrexham, Wales	Wales	2–0	2–0	UEFA Euro 1980 qualifying
14.	17 October 1979	Müngersdorfer Stadion, Cologne, West Germany	Wales	1–0	5–1	UEFA Euro 1980 qualifying
15.	17 October 1979	Müngersdorfer Stadion, Cologne, West Germany	Wales	3–0	5–1	UEFA Euro 1980 qualifying
16.	21 November 1979	Lenin Stadium, Tbilisi, Georgia	Soviet Union	3–0	3–1	Friendly
17.	22 December 1979	Parkstadion, Gelsenkirchen, West Germany	Turkey	1–0	2–0	UEFA Euro 1980 qualifying
18.	27 February 1980	Weserstadion, Bremen, West Germany	Malta	3–0	8–0	UEFA Euro 1980 qualifying
19.	27 February 1980	Weserstadion, Bremen, West Germany	Malta	8–0	8–0	UEFA Euro 1980 qualifying
20.	29 April 1981	Volksparkstadion, Hamburg, West Germany	Austria	2–0	2–0	1982 FIFA World Cup qualification
21.	19 May 1981	Neckarstadion, Stuttgart, West Germany	Brazil	1–0	1–2	Friendly
22.	24 May 1981	Keskusurheilukenttä, Lahti, Finland	Finland	2–0	4–0	1982 FIFA World Cup qualification
23.	24 May 1981	Keskusurheilukenttä, Lahti, Finland	Finland	4–0	4–0	1982 FIFA World Cup qualification
24.	2 September 1981	Stadion Śląski, Chorzów, Poland	Poland	1–0	2–0	Friendly
25.	23 September 1981	Ruhrstadion, Bochum, West Germany	Finland	1–0	7–1	1982 FIFA World Cup qualification
26.	18 November 1981	Westfalenstadion, Dortmund, West Germany	Albania	3–0	8–0	1982 FIFA World Cup qualification
27.	18 November 1981	Westfalenstadion, Dortmund, West Germany	Albania	8–0	8–0	1982 FIFA World Cup qualification
28.	22 November 1981	Rheinstadion, Düsseldorf, West Germany	Bulgaria	1–0	4–0	1982 FIFA World Cup qualification
29.	17 February 1982	Niedersachsenstadion, Hanover, West Germany	Portugal	1–0	3–1	Friendly
30.	17 February 1982	Niedersachsenstadion, Hanover, West Germany	Portugal	3–1	3–1	Friendly
31.	2 July 1982	Santiago Bernabéu Stadium, Madrid, Spain	Spain	2–1	2–1	1982 FIFA World Cup
32.	8 July 1982	Ramón Sánchez Pizjuán Stadium, Seville, Spain	France	3–3	3–3 (a.e.t.) (5–4 p)	1982 FIFA World Cup

== Honours ==
Schalke 04

- DFB-Pokal: 1971–72

1. FC Köln

- DFB-Pokal: 1982–83

West Germany

- FIFA World Cup runner-up: 1982

Individual

- Bundesliga top scorer: 1975–76 (29 goals)
- Goal of the Year (Germany): 1977
- Goal of the Decade (Germany)
- Goal of the Century (Germany)
- Sport Ideal European XI: 1977
- kicker Bundesliga Team of the Season: 1984–85
