= 1971–72 DFB-Pokal =

Tournament details
- Country: West Germany
- Teams: 32

Final positions
- Champions: Schalke 04
- Runners-up: 1. FC Kaiserslautern

Tournament statistics
- Matches played: 61

The 1971–72 DFB-Pokal was the 29th season of the annual German football cup competition. It began on 4 December 1971 and ended on 1 July 1972. 32 teams competed in the tournament of five rounds. In the final Schalke 04 defeated 1. FC Kaiserslautern 5–0, the largest margin by which a DFB-Pokal final was ever decided.

== Mode ==
The tournament consisted of five rounds. In each round other than the final the games were held over two legs, with the team winning on aggregate advancing to the next round. In case the score was level after two legs, the second game was extended by 30 minutes of extra time. If still no winner could be determined a Penalty shoot-out decided which team advanced to the next round.

The final was held over one leg with 30 minutes of extra time in case the game was a draw after regular time. If the score was still level the game was replayed with 30 minutes of extra time in case of another draw. If still no winner could be determined, a penalty shoot-out decided the winner of the cup.

== Matches ==
=== First round ===
Date	Home team	Score	Away team
4 December 1971	FC St. Pauli	1 – 1	Rot-Weiß Oberhausen
14 December 1971	Rot-Weiß Oberhausen	2 – 1	FC St. Pauli
Rot-Weiß Oberhausen won 3 – 2 on aggregate
4 December 1971	Bayer 04 Leverkusen	0 – 3	Borussia Mönchengladbach
14 December 1971	Borussia Mönchengladbach	4 – 2	Bayer 04 Leverkusen
Borussia Mönchengladbach won 7 – 2 on aggregate
4 December 1971	SV Alsenborn	0 – 0	Fortuna Düsseldorf
15 December 1971	Fortuna Düsseldorf	3 – 0	SV Alsenborn
Fortuna Düsseldorf won 3 – 0 on aggregate
4 December 1971	Tasmania 1900 Berlin	2 – 2	VfL Bochum
15 December 1971	VfL Bochum	2 – 0	Tasmania 1900 Berlin
VfL Bochum won 4 – 2 on aggregate
4 December 1971	VfR Heilbronn	1 – 1	VfB Stuttgart
15 December 1971	VfB Stuttgart	4 – 0	VfR Heilbronn
VfB Stuttgart won 5 – 1 on aggregate
4 December 1971	Kickers Offenbach	1 – 1	Borussia Dortmund
15 December 1971	Borussia Dortmund	0 – 3	Kickers Offenbach
Kickers Offenbach won 4 – 1 on aggregate
4 December 1971	FC Schalke 04	3 – 1	Hertha BSC
15 December 1971	Hertha BSC	0 – 2^{*}	FC Schalke 04
FC Schalke 04 won 5 – 1 on aggregate
4 December 1971	Holstein Kiel	5 – 4	Hannover 96
15 December 1971	Hannover 96	7 – 1	Holstein Kiel
Hannover 96 won 11 – 6 on aggregate
4 December 1971	Freiburger FC	1 – 2	Hamburger SV
15 December 1971	Hamburger SV	2 – 2	Freiburger FC
Hamburger SV won 4 – 3 on aggregate
4 December 1971	Essener FV 1912	1 – 9	1. FC Köln
15 December 1971	1. FC Köln	5 – 0	Essener FV 1912
1. FC Köln won 14 – 1 on aggregate
4 December 1971	Wuppertaler SV Borussia	2 – 1	1. FC Kaiserslautern
15 December 1971	1. FC Kaiserslautern	3 – 2 (AET)	Wuppertaler SV Borussia
1. FC Kaiserslautern won 5 – 3 on penalties
4 December 1971	Fortuna Köln	2 – 1	FC Bayern Munich
15 December 1971	FC Bayern Munich	6 – 0	Fortuna Köln
FC Bayern Munich won 7 – 2 on aggregate
4 December 1971	Arminia Bielefeld	1 – 1	MSV Duisburg
15 December 1971	MSV Duisburg	3 – 1	Arminia Bielefeld
MSV Duisburg won 4 – 2 on aggregate
4 December 1971	SpVgg Bad Pyrmont	1 – 4	SV Werder Bremen
15 December 1971	SV Werder Bremen	6 – 0	SpVgg Bad Pyrmont
SV Werder Bremen won 10 – 1 on aggregate
4 December 1971	Borussia Neunkirchen	2 – 4	Eintracht Braunschweig
15 December 1971	Eintracht Braunschweig	0 – 0	Borussia Neunkirchen
Eintracht Braunschweig won 4 – 2 on aggregate
4 December 1971	FC Schweinfurt 05	1 – 0	Eintracht Frankfurt
15 December 1971	Eintracht Frankfurt	6 – 1	FC Schweinfurt 05
Eintracht Frankfurt won 6 – 2 on aggregate

=== Round of 16 ===
Date	Home team	Score	Away team
12 February 1972	Borussia Mönchengladbach	4 – 2	Eintracht Frankfurt
22 February 1972	Eintracht Frankfurt	3 – 2	Borussia Mönchengladbach
Borussia Mönchengladbach won 6 – 5 on aggregate
14 February 1972	Hannover 96	0 – 0	VfL Bochum
22 February 1972	VfL Bochum	2 – 4	Hannover 96
Hannover 96 won 4 – 2 on aggregate
14 February 1972	SV Werder Bremen	4 – 2	Hamburger SV
22 February 1972	Hamburger SV	1 – 0	SV Werder Bremen
SV Werder Bremen won 4 – 3 on aggregate
14 February 1972	Fortuna Düsseldorf	1 – 1	FC Schalke 04
22 February 1972	FC Schalke 04	2 – 1	Fortuna Düsseldorf
FC Schalke 04 won 3 – 2 on aggregate
14 February 1972	VfB Stuttgart	4 – 3	1. FC Kaiserslautern
22 February 1972	1. FC Kaiserslautern	3 – 1	VfB Stuttgart
1. FC Kaiserslautern won 6 – 5 on aggregate
14 February 1972	MSV Duisburg	2 – 2	Rot-Weiß Oberhausen
22 February 1972	Rot-Weiß Oberhausen	1 – 0	MSV Duisburg
Rot-Weiß Oberhausen won 3 – 2 on aggregate
14 February 1972	Kickers Offenbach	3 – 1	1. FC Köln
22 February 1972	1. FC Köln	4 – 0	Kickers Offenbach
1. FC Köln won 5 – 3 on aggregate
14 February 1972	Eintracht Braunschweig	0 – 0	FC Bayern Munich
22 February 1972	FC Bayern Munich	3 – 1 (AET)	Eintracht Braunschweig
FC Bayern Munich won 3 – 1 on aggregate

=== Quarter-finals ===
Date	Home team	Score	Away team
1 April 1972	FC Bayern Munich	3 – 0	1. FC Köln
12 April 1972	1. FC Köln	5 – 1	FC Bayern Munich
1. FC Köln won 5 – 4 on aggregate
1 April 1972	Borussia Mönchengladbach	2 – 2	FC Schalke 04
5 April 1972	FC Schalke 04	1 – 0	Borussia Mönchengladbach
FC Schalke 04 won 3 – 2 on aggregate
1 April 1972	Rot-Weiß Oberhausen	3 – 1	1. FC Kaiserslautern
5 April 1972	1. FC Kaiserslautern	5 – 0 (AET)	Rot-Weiß Oberhausen
1. FC Kaiserslautern won 6 – 3 on aggregate
1 April 1972	Hannover 96	0 – 2	SV Werder Bremen
5 April 1972	SV Werder Bremen	2 – 1	Hannover 96
SV Werder Bremen won 4 – 1 on aggregate

=== Semi-finals ===
Date	Home team	Score	Away team
30 May 1972	1. FC Kaiserslautern	2 – 1	SV Werder Bremen
10 June 1972	SV Werder Bremen	1 – 2	1. FC Kaiserslautern
1. FC Kaiserslautern won 4 – 2 on aggregate
30 May 1972	1. FC Köln	4 – 1	FC Schalke 04
10 June 1972	FC Schalke 04	5 – 2	1. FC Köln
FC Schalke 04 won 6 – 5 on penalties

=== Final ===
1 July 1972
16:00 CET

Schalke 04	5–0	1. FC Kaiserslautern
H. Kremers 13', 82'; Scheer 32'; Lütkebohmert 57'; Fischer 66'	Report

Niedersachsenstadion, Hanover
Attendance: 61,000
Referee: Heinz Aldinger (Waiblingen)
