= 1971 Bundesliga scandal =

Sports scandal in Germany

The Bundesliga scandal (der Bundesliga-Skandal) refers to the malicious for-profit manipulation of games in the 1970–71 German football championship season.

== History ==
The manipulation of games was revealed when the president of Kickers Offenbach, Horst-Gregorio Canellas, presented an audio-tape to DFB officials and a few journalists at his 50th birthday garden-party. In that tape, several players, including German internationals Bernd Patzke and Manfred Manglitz, could be heard offering to let themselves be bribed to help Offenbach avoid relegation.

The chief prosecutor of the DFB, Hans Kindermann, found out that, amongst others, the 17 April 1971 game between FC Schalke and Arminia Bielefeld that ended 0–1, had been "sold" (or thrown) by Schalke's players and the board of directors. Afterwards, many of the Schalke players were banned for long periods, while several lifetime bans were imposed.

The players maintained their innocence, and even swore an oath to that, but the oath was eventually proven to be false. Schalke's rivals, especially from the Ruhr, still occasionally refer to Schalke as FC Meineid (German for "FC Perjury").

Fifty-two players, two managers and six club functionaries were punished. Also, Bielefeld and Offenbach had their license to participate in the Bundesliga revoked. Offenbach had been relegated due to their sporting performance anyway, despite the manipulated games, but Bielefeld played in the next Bundesliga season. Eventually, Bielefeld finished playing all 34 games of the 1971–72 season, but were punished by automatic relegation after that season, officially receiving zero points for each game independently of their actual record.

== Manipulated games ==
- 17 April 1971: Schalke vs Bielefeld, 0–1
- 5 May 1971: Köln vs Essen, 3–2
- 8 May 1971: Offenbach vs Oberhausen, 3–2
- 22 May 1971: Köln vs Oberhausen, 2–4; Duisburg vs Bielefeld, 4–1
- 29 May 1971: Bielefeld vs Stuttgart, 1–0; Offenbach vs Frankfurt, 0–2
- 5 June 1971: Braunschweig vs Oberhausen, 1–1^{*}; Hertha BSC vs Bielefeld, 0–1; Köln vs Offenbach, 4–2

^{*}Strictly speaking, the game was not manipulated, but the Braunschweig players were promised, and given, for winning this game an additional bonus by a third party, which was illegal.

== Punished participants ==
=== Players ===
- Hertha BSC: Tasso Wild, Bernd Patzke, Jürgen Rumor, Laszlo Gergely, Volkmar Groß, Peter Enders, Wolfgang Gayer, Arno Steffenhagen, Karl-Heinz Ferschl, Hans-Jürgen Sperlich, Franz Brungs, Jürgen Weber, Michael Kellner, Uwe Witt, and Zoltán Varga.
- VfB Stuttgart: Hans Arnold, Hartmut Weiß, and Hans Eisele.
- FC Schalke 04: Klaus Fichtel, Hans-Jürgen Wittkamp, Rolf Rüssmann, Herbert Lütkebohmert, Manfred Pohlschmidt, Hans Pirkner, Jürgen Sobieray, Klaus Fischer, Reinhard Libuda, Dieter Burdenski, Klaus Senger, Jürgen-Michael Galbierz, and Heinz van Haaren.
- Arminia Bielefeld: Waldemar Slomiany and Jürgen Neumann.
- MSV Duisburg: Volker Danner and Gerhard Kentschke.
- Eintracht Braunschweig: Lothar Ulsaß, Horst Wolter, Wolfgang Grzyb, Peter Kaack, Franz Merkhoffer, Bernd Gersdorff, Klaus Gerwien, Rainer Skrotzki, Eberhard Haun, Jaro Deppe, Dietmar Erler, Friedhelm Haebermann, Joachim Bäse, Michael Polywka, and Burkhardt Öller.

=== Coaches ===
- Oberhausen: Egon Piechaczek and Günter Brocker

=== Club officials ===
- Oberhausen: Peter Maaßen
- Hertha BSC: Wolfgang Holst
- Offenbach: Horst-Gregorio Canellas, Friedrich Mann, Fritz Koch, and Waldemar Klein.

== See also ==
- Bundesliga scandal (1965)
- Bundesliga scandal (2005)
