= Jürgen-Michael Galbierz =

German footballer (born 1950)

Personal information
- Date of birth: 7 February 1950 (age 76)
- Place of birth: Gelsenkirchen, North Rhine-Westphalia, West Germany
- Positions: Defender; midfielder

Youth career
- ???–1968: SC Hassel

Senior career*
Years	Team	Apps	(Gls)
1968–1971	Schalke 04	27	(1)
1971–1979	Wuppertaler SV	65	(5)
1978	→ Herford (loan)	19	(0)
- * Club domestic league appearances and goals

Jürgen-Michael Galbierz (born 2 February 1950) is a retired German footballer. He played as both a defender and a midfielder for Schalke 04 and Wuppertaler SV throughout the 1970s.

== Club career ==
Galbierz, who came to the "Knappen" from SC Hassel, made his Bundesliga debut for FC Schalke 04 as an 18-year-old on 31 August 1968 in the away 1–1 draw against VfB Stuttgart. However, the young player was substituted for Hans-Jürgen Becher as a defender on the 68th minute by coach Günter Brocker. Even when Rudi Gutendorf replaced Brocker on 22 November 1968, nothing changed in the starting XI with Becher, Friedel Rausch and Klaus Senger firmly establishing themselves within the Starting XI with Galbierz making only five league appearances in his first year in the Bundesliga as the club reached 7th place. In addition to Galbierz, Schalke had also managed the further signings of Heinz van Haaren, Franz Hasil, Gerd Kasperski, Herbert Lütkebohmert, Bernd Michel and the repatriation of Reinhard Libuda before the 1968–69 season. During the subsequent 1969–70 season, he played in 13 league games with a single goal and Schalke finished 9th under coach Gutendorf with the team improving following the signings of Hans Pirkner, Rolf Rüssmann, Klaus Scheer, Jürgen Sobieray and Alban Wüst. During the 1970–71 season, coach Gutendorf was replaced by Serbian manager Slobodan Čendić from 8 September 1970 to the end of the season with Galbierz had played nine league games. Despite his low appearances, he would eventually take part in the 1971 Bundesliga scandal through his participation in the Königsblauen home loss against Arminia Bielefeld on 17 April 1971.

As a result, he then signed to Wuppertaler SV for the 1971–72 Regionalliga and under manager Horst Buhtz, successfully achieved promotion with Galbierz playing 29 games along with scoring 6 goals alongside forward Günter Pröpper. However, because Galbierz was still implicated in the scandal, he was fined 2,300 DM and received a ban from the Bundesliga on 5 August 1972 which was to last until 4 August 1974. Following his pardon on 6 August 1973 however, he played in their 1973–74 season and would continue to play in the Bundesliga until the club's relegation in the 1974–75 season season. He remained in Wuppertal into the 2. Bundesliga. However, he was briefly loaned Herford in the second half of the 1977–78 season where he played alongside other players such as Jürgen Fleer, Heinz Knüwe and Uwe Pallaks as the club would be relegated by the end of the season. The following 1978–79 season saw the end of his career as he had been injured to the point of where after he came on as a substitute in the 46th minute in the 4–1 away defeat against SV Arminia Hannover on 10 September 1978, he had to leave at the 51st minute. His limited availability caused Galbierz to retire soon after the season ended.

== Later life ==
Galbierz remains active in the fan culture of his former club of Schalke, co-founding a fan club called Delmeknappen in 2019 alongside his former teammate Bernd Michel.
