= 1976–77 FC Schalke 04 season =

FC Schalke 04
1976-77 season
- Manager: Friedel Rausch
- Stadium: Parkstadion
- Bundesliga: 2nd
- DFB-Pokal: Round of 16
- UEFA Cup: Third round
- Top goalscorer: League: Klaus Fischer (24 goals); All: Klaus Fischer (34 goals)

In the 1976-77 season, Schalke 04 ended its league campaign with 43 points, only to end up as runner-up to Borussia Mönchengladbach, who won the Bundesliga with one more point over the Gelsenkirchen club. They reached the quarter-finals of the DFB-Pokal, where they faced against Eintracht Frankfurt. A 2-2 tie led to a replay where Schalke lost to Frankfurt by 4-3. In the UEFA Cup, they defeated Porto and Sportul Studențesc in the first two rounds, but lost to Molenbeek in the third round.

== Squad ==
Note: Flags indicate national team as defined under FIFA eligibility rules; some limited exceptions apply. Players may hold more than one non-FIFA nationality.

| No. | Pos. | Nation | Player |
|---|---|---|---|
| — | GK | YUG | Enver Marić |
| — | GK | GER | Günter Schubert |
| — | DF | GER | Hans-Günter Bruns |
| — | DF | GER | Norbert Dörmann |
| — | DF | GER | Klaus Fichtel |
| — | DF | GER | Helmut Kremers |
| — | DF | GER | Rolf Rüssmann |
| — | DF | GER | Horst Wohlers |
| — | DF | GER | Mathias Schipper |
| — | DF | GER | Jürgen Sobieray |
| — | DF | GER | Bernd Thiele |
| — | MF | GER | Ulrich Bittcher |
| — | MF | GER | Hannes Bongartz |
| — | MF | GER | Manfred Dubski |
| — | MF | GER | Hans-Jürgen Gede |
| — | MF | GER | Thomas Lander |
| — | MF | GER | Herbert Lütkebohmert |
| — | MF | YUG | Branko Oblak |

| No. | Pos. | Nation | Player |
|---|---|---|---|
| — | FW | GER | Rüdiger Abramczik |
| — | FW | GER | Klaus Fischer |
| — | FW | GER | Uwe Höfer |
| — | FW | GER | Erwin Kremers |
| — | FW | GER | Friedhelm Schütte |

== Competitions ==
=== Bundesliga ===
==== League table ====
| Pos | Team | Pld | W | D | L | GF | GA | GD | Pts | Qualification or relegation |
|---|---|---|---|---|---|---|---|---|---|---|
| 1 | Borussia Mönchengladbach (C) | 34 | 17 | 10 | 7 | 58 | 34 | +24 | 44 | Qualification to European Cup first round |
| 2 | Schalke 04 | 34 | 17 | 9 | 8 | 77 | 52 | +25 | 43 | Qualification to UEFA Cup first round (Note: As 1. FC Köln qualified for the Cup Winners' Cup, their UEFA Cup spot was transferred to Bayern Munich.) |
| 3 | Eintracht Braunschweig | 34 | 15 | 13 | 6 | 56 | 38 | +18 | 43 | Qualification to UEFA Cup first round |
| 4 | Eintracht Frankfurt | 34 | 17 | 8 | 9 | 86 | 57 | +29 | 42 | Qualification to UEFA Cup first round |
| 5 | 1. FC Köln | 34 | 17 | 6 | 11 | 83 | 61 | +22 | 40 | Qualification to Cup Winners' Cup first round (Note: Hamburger SV won the 1976–77 European Cup Winners' Cup and thereby automatically qualified as defending champions.) |

Source: www.dfb.de
Rules for classification: 1) points; 2) goal difference; 3) number of goals scored.
(C) Champions

===== Matches =====
| 14 August 1976 1 | Schalke 04 | 3-2 | SV Werder Bremen | Parkstadion, Gelsenkirchen |
| 15:30 | Oblak 15'; Bongartz 24'; Fischer 67' | Report | Kamp 40'; Röntved 86' | Attendance: 27,000; Referee: Peter Gabor |

| 20 August 1976 2 | Kaiserslautern | 2-0 | Schalke 04 | Stadion Betzenberg, Kaiserslautern |
| 20:00 | Toppmöller 47'; Diehl 52' (pen.) | Report | | Attendance: 30,000; Referee: Klaus Ohmsen |

| 28 August 1976 3 | Schalke 04 | 3-0 | Rot-Weiß Essen | Parkstadion, Gelsenkirchen |
| 15:30 | Abramczik 2'; Kremers 19', 45' | Report | | Attendance: 32,000; Referee: Udo Zuchantke |

| 3 September 1976 4 | Eintracht Frankfurt | 6-3 | Schalke 04 | Waldstadion, Frankfurt |
| 20:00 | Kraus 48'; Nickel 59'; Grabowski 74', 87'; Hölzenbein 75', 89' | Report | Abramczik; Kremers 29'; Lütkebohmert 82' | Attendance: 27,000; Referee: Walter Horstmann |

| 11 September 1976 5 | Schalke 04 | 2-1 | Fortuna Düsseldorf | Parkstadion, Gelsenkirchen |
| 15:30 | Fischer 11'; Kremers 86' | Report | Mattsson 23' | Attendance: 18,000; Referee: Gert Meuser |

| 18 September 1976 6 | Eintracht Braunschweig | 1-0 | Schalke 04 | Eintracht-Stadion, Braunschweig |
| 15:30 | Popivoda 52' | Report | | Attendance: 26,000; Referee: Max Klauser |

| 25 September 1976 7 | Schalke 04 | 5-4 | Tennis Borussia Berlin | Parkstadion, Gelsenkirchen |
| 15:30 | Kremers 19'; Schulz 33'; Fischer 33', 57'; Oblak 70' | Report | Schneider 44', 52'; Subklewe 54'; Wendt 63' | Attendance: 17,000; Referee: Manfred Dölfel |

| 2 October 1976 8 | Köln | 2-0 | Schalke 04 | Müngersdorfer Stadion, Cologne |
| 15:30 | Gerber 76'; Müller 88' | Report | | Attendance: 55,500; Referee: Winfried Walz |

| 9 October 1976 9 | Bayern Munich | 0-7 | Schalke 04 | Olympiastadion, Munich |
| 15:30 | | Report | Fischer 11', 46', 67', 82'; Kremers 44'; Dubski 64'; Abramczik 74' | Attendance: 50,000; Referee: Günter Linn |

| 23 October 1976 10 | Schalke 04 | 1-0 | Hamburg | Parkstadion, Gelsenkirchen |
| 15:30 | Fischer 80' | Report | | Attendance: 60,000; Referee: Jürgen Messmer |

| 30 October 1976 11 | Saarbrücken | 2-3 | Schalke 04 | Ludwigsparkstadion, Saarbrücken |
| 16:00 | Denz 15'; Semlitsch 30' | Report | Abramczik 38'; Rüssmann 59'; Fischer 66' | Attendance: 25,000; Referee: Klaus Ohmsen |

| 6 November 1976 12 | Schalke 04 | 2-2 | Karlsruhe | Parkstadion, Gelsenkirchen |
| 15:30 | Oblak 34'; Fischer 64' | Report | Schäfer 53', 71' | Attendance: 25,000; Referee: Heinz Quindeau |

| 13 November 1976 13 | Borussia Mönchengladbach | 2-0 | Schalke 04 | Bökelbergstadion, Mönchengladbach |
| 15:30 | Wittkamp 38'; Heynckes 78' | Report | | Attendance: 34,500; Referee: Herbert Lutz |

| 20 November 1976 14 | Schalke 04 | 3-2 | Duisburg | Parkstadion, Gelsenkirchen |
| 15:30 | Bongartz 30', 65'; Rüssmann 39' | Report | | Attendance: 30,000; Referee: Paul Kindervater |

| 27 November 1976 15 | Hertha BSC | 2-1 | Schalke 04 | Olympiastadion, Berlin |
| 15:30 | Horr 74'; Beer 90' | Report | Bongartz 40' | Attendance: 15,000; Referee: Gert Meuser |

| 4 December 1976 16 | Schalke 04 | 3-1 | Bochum | Parkstadion, Gelsenkirchen |
| 15:30 | Lütkebohmert 6'; Kremers 76', 78' | Report | Trimhold 73' | Attendance: 25,000; Referee: Walter Engel |

| 11 December 1976 17 | Borussia Dortmund | 2-2 | Schalke 04 | Westfalenstadion, Dortmund |
| 15:30 | Hartl 26'; Lippens 77' | Report | Bongartz 5'; Meyer 35' (pen.) | Attendance: 54,000; Referee: Eckhard Jensen |

| 15 January 1977 18 | Werder Bremen | 1-1 | Schalke 04 | Weserstadion, Bremen |
| 15:30 | Meininger 33' | Report | Fischer 26' | Attendance: 15,000; Referee: Wilfried Haselberger |

| 22 January 1977 19 | Schalke 04 | 5-2 | Kaiserslautern | Parkstadion, Gelsenkirchen |
| 15:30 | Fischer 10', 20' (pen.), 40'; Dubski 58'; Bittcher 87' | Report | Stickel 45'; Toppmöller 63' | Attendance: 18,000; Referee: Dieter Dreher |

| 5 February 1977 21 | Schalke 04 | 1-1 | Eintracht Frankfurt | Parkstadion, Gelsenkirchen |
| 15:30 | Rüssmann 50' | Report | Kremers 30' (o.g.) | Attendance: 25,000; Referee: Walter Engel |

| 12 February 1977 22 | Fortuna Düsseldorf | 1-2 | Schalke 04 | Rheinstadion, Düsseldorf |
| 15:30 | Seel 49' | Report | Kremers 8'; Bongartz 85' | Attendance: 29,000; Referee: Walter Eschweiler |

| 26 February 1977 23 | Schalke 04 | 2-3 | Eintracht Braunschweig | Parkstadion, Gelsenkirchen |
| 15:30 | Abramczik 56'; Fischer 57' | Report | Holzer 2'; Frank 50'; Popivoda 60' | Attendance: 52,000; Referee: Heinz Aldinger |

| 1 March 1977 20 | Rot-Weiß Essen | 2-2 | Schalke 04 | Georg-Melches-Stadion, Essen |
| 20:00 | Hrubesch 34'; Lund 55' | Report | Bittcher 12'; Kremers 40' | Attendance: 30,000; Referee: Winfried Walz |

| 5 March 1977 24 | Tennis Borussia Berlin | 1-3 | Schalke 04 | Olympiastadion, Berlin |
| 15:30 | Rüssmann 3' (o.g.) | Report | Rüssmann 28'; Abramczik 30'; Kremers 86' | Attendance: 13,000; Referee: Manfred Dölfel |

| 12 March 1977 25 | Schalke 04 | 1-1 | Köln | Parkstadion, Gelsenkirchen |
| 15:30 | Abramczik 28' | Report | Zimmermann 21' | Attendance: 60,000; Referee: Rudolf Frickel |

| 19 March 1977 26 | Schalke 04 | 0-0 | Bayern Munich | Parkstadion, Gelsenkirchen |
| 15:30 | | Report | | Attendance: 72,000; Referee: Theo Antz |

| 26 March 1977 27 | Hamburg | 2-2 | Schalke 04 | Volksparkstadion, Hamburg |
| 15:30 | Steffenhagen 60', 83' | Report | Fischer 55'; Rüssmann 84' | Attendance: 38,000; Referee: Horst Joos |

| 2 April 1977 28 | Schalke 04 | 0-1 | Saarbrücken | Parkstadion, Gelsenkirchen |
| 15:30 | | Report | Ellbracht 78' | Attendance: 15,000; Referee: Walter Niemann |

| 9 April 1977 29 | Karlsruhe | 1-7 | Schalke 04 | Wildparkstadion, Karlsruhe |
| 15:30 | Struth 71' | Report | Fischer 10', 25', 54'; Abramczik 22'; Bongartz 75'; Rüssmann 83', 87' | Attendance: 40,000; Referee: Günter Linn |

| 16 April 1977 30 | Schalke 04 | 1-0 | Borussia Mönchengladbach | Parkstadion, Gelsenkirchen |
| 15:30 | Abramczik 6' | Report | | Attendance: 70,600; Referee: Heinz Aldinger |

| 23 April 1977 31 | Duisburg | 2-2 | Schalke 04 | Wedaustadion, Duisburg |
| 15:30 | Worm 34'; Jara 67' | Report | Rüssmann 22'; Bücker 54' (o.g.) | Attendance: 26,000; Referee: Eberhard Schmoock |

| 7 May 1977 32 | Schalke 04 | 4-0 | Hertha BSC | Parkstadion, Gelsenkirchen |
| 15:30 | Sobieray 10'; Fischer 12', 75'; Rüssmann 88' | Report | | Attendance: 25,000; Referee: Wilfried Haselberger |

| 14 May 1977 33 | Bochum | 1-2 | Schalke 04 | Ruhrstadion, Bochum |
| 15:30 | Eggert 11' | Report | Gerland 34' (o.g.); Lander 89' | Attendance: 20,000; Referee: Wolf-Dieter Ahlenfelde |

| 21 May 1977 34 | Schalke 04 | 4-2 | Borussia Dortmund | Parkstadion, Gelsenkirchen |
| 15:30 | Abramczik 22'; Fischer 26', 77'; Ackermann 48' (o.g.) | Report | Segler 61'; Meyer 79' | Attendance: 70,600; Referee: Rainer Waltert |

=== DFB-Pokal ===
| 6 August 1976 First round | SV Wiesbaden | 1-3 | Schalke 04 | Taunusstein, Wiesbaden |
| | Martens 32' | Report | Kremers 11', 30'; Fischer 44' | Attendance: 7,000; Referee: Heinz Kettenbach |

| 16 October 1976 Second round | Schalke 04 | 6-1 | SG Ellingen-Bonefeld-Willroth | Parkstadion, Gelsenkirchen |
| | Fischer 13', 53'; Abramczik 17'; Gede 68'; Schütte 83'; Dubski 84' | Report | Kahler 85' | Attendance: 12,000; Referee: Rainer Boos |

| 18 December 1976 Third round | Schalke 04 | 1-0 | FSV Frankfurt | Parkstadion, Gelsenkirchen |
| | Abramczik 13' | Report | | Attendance: 5,000; Referee: Walter Niemann |

| 8 January 1977 Round of 16 | Schalke 04 | 2-2 (a.e.t.) | Eintracht Frankfurt | Parkstadion, Gelsenkirchen |
| | Fichtel 22'; Abramczik 44' | Report | Weidle 63'; Trinklein 74' | Attendance: 11,000; Referee: Winfried Hanschke |

| 25 January 1977 Round of 16 replay | Eintracht Frankfurt | 4-3 (a.e.t.) | Schalke 04 | Waldstadion, Frankfurt |
| | Hölzenbein 9' (pen.), 52'; Nickel 17'; Grabowski 71' | Report | Oblak 62'; Rüssmann 68'; Fischer 78' | Attendance: 27,000; Referee: Günter Linn |

=== UEFA Cup ===
==== First round ====
| 8 September 1976 First leg | Porto (Portugal) | 2–2 | (West Germany) Schalke 04 | Estádio da Luz, Lisbon |
| | Reis 47'; Cubillas 66' | Report | Fischer 37', 44' | Attendance: 33,000; Referee: William Gow (Wales) |

| 29 September 1976 Second leg | Schalke 04 (West Germany) | 3–2 | (Portugal) Porto | Parkstadion, Gelsenkirchen |
| | Fichtel 74' (pen.); Abramczik 86'; Fischer 88' | Report | Oliveira 51', 69' | Attendance: 32,000; Referee: Jack Taylor (England) |

==== Second round ====
| 20 October 1976 First leg | Sportul Studențesc (Romania) | 0–1 | (West Germany) Schalke 04 | Stadionul Republicii, Bucharest |
| | | Report | Fischer 59' | Attendance: 2,500; Referee: Doğan Babacan (Turkey) |

| 3 November 1976 Second leg | Schalke 04 (West Germany) | 4–0 | (Romania) Sportul Studențesc | Parkstadion, Gelsenkirchen |
| | Bongartz 2', 78'; Fischer 15', 24' | Report | | Attendance: 40,000; Referee: Pavel Kazakov (Soviet Union) |

==== Third round ====
| 24 November 1976 First leg | Molenbeek (Belgium) | 1–0 | (West Germany) Schalke 04 | Oscar Bossaert Stadium, Brussels |
| | Lafont 86' | Report | | Attendance: 10,000; Referee: António Garrido (Portugal) |

| 7 December 1976 Second leg | Schalke 04 (West Germany) | 1–1 | (Belgium) Molenbeek | Parkstadion, Gelsenkirchen |
| | Abramczik 45' | Report | Teugels 25' | Attendance: 35,000; Referee: Pat Partridge (England) |
