= Rainer Skrotzki =

German footballer (1945–2002)

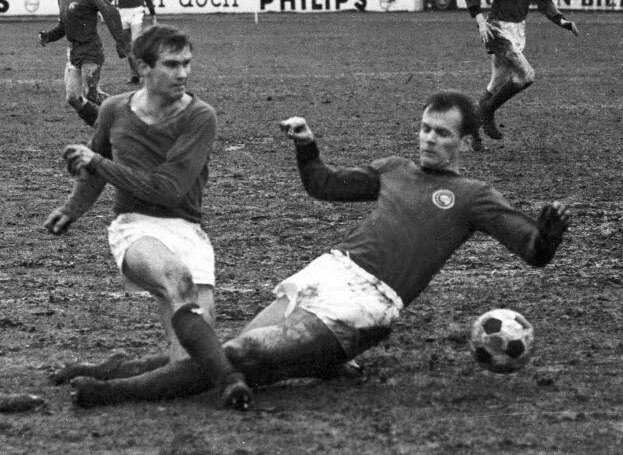
- Skrotzki (left) in a match against Concordia Hamburg in 1966

Personal information
- Date of birth: 25 May 1945
- Place of birth: Neumünster, Schleswig-Holstein, Germany
- Date of death: 4 March 2002
- Position: Midfielder

Youth career
- TSV Klausdorf
- SC Comet Kiel

Senior career*
Years	Team	Apps	(Gls)
1964–1965	VfR Neumünster	29	(13)
1965–1967	Holstein Kiel	47	(8)
1967–1968	Bayern Hof	24	(4)
1968–1970	Wuppertaler SV	62	(10)
1979–1972	Eintracht Braunschweig	36	(2)
1972–1973	SpVgg Ludwigsburg	27	(4)
1973–1976	Schweinfurt 05	54	(8)
- * Club domestic league appearances and goals

Rainer Skrotzki (25 May 1945 – 4 March 2002) was a German footballer. He played as a midfielder for Wuppertaler SV, Eintracht Braunschweig and Schweinfurt 05 throughout the 1970s.

== Ckub career ==
=== Regionalliga Nord (1964–67) ===
Skrotzki began his career within his hometown of Neumünster through playing for TSV Klausdorf and SC Comet Kiel in his youth career before making his senior debut for VfR Neumünster during the 1964–65 Regionalliga. With a team composing of players such as Hartmut Burandt, Manfred Buttgereit, Klaus Kähler, Jürgen Schmahl and Karlheinz Stegelmann, Skrotzki's debut season saw him play 29 matches and score 13 goals. However, the club was relegated to the Amateurliga by the end of the season after reaching 16th place in the Regionalliga Nord. However, he continued his career after Holstein Kiel took interest in the young midfielder and thus, he continued his career within the Regionalliga Nord and had two successful season with the Die Störche, reaching third place in each season with Skrotszki's debut for the club occurring on 15 August 1965 in a 2–1 victory against TuS Bremerhaven 93 under manager Hellmut Meidt. He had also established himself within the attacking formation of the club alongside Gerd Koll, Franz-Josef Hönig, Gerd Saborowski, Jürgen Rohweder with Skrotzki often playing in the left wing alongside Rohweder. However, his second season saw him play on both sides of the field as he would demonstrate this on 28 August 1966 in a 1–0 victory against VfV Hildesheim which left an impression on manager Rudi Faßnacht. However, the club narrowly missed the promotional playoffs after a crucial 0–2 away defeat against Sperber Hamburg on 4 May. Thus, despite the relative success Skrotzki had with Holstein Kiel, he chose to sign a new contract with Bayern Hof in the Regionalliga Süd.

=== Regionalliga Süd and West (1967–70) ===
Under coach Heinz Elzner and alongside Siegfried Stark and Wolfgang Breuer, he was part of the winning squad for the 1967–68 Regionalliga Süd, beating Kickers Offenbach from the title and scored 4 goals in 24 appearances. However, in the subsequent Bundesliga promotional playoffs, he played in the 0–1 defeat against Rot-Weiss Essen and the 1–3 defeat against Göttingen 05. This led to him leaving the south and pursuing a career in the Regionalliga West with Wuppertaler SV. Manager Horst Buhtz had been working on a project to reconstruct the team with Skrotzki making a decisive first impression in the 2–0 home win against Fortuna Düsseldorf on 18 August 1968. This led to Skrotzki achieving perfect attendance throughout all 34 matchdays, scoring 5 goals and leading Wuppertal to finish in 5th place. The following 1969–70 season saw Buhtz bring in players such as Gustav Jung and Günter Pröpper to assist Skrotzki in the offensive formation in the club, finishing in an improved 3rd place. His performance in the Regionalliga West led to Bundesliga club Eintracht Braunschweig being interested in signing him for their 1970–71 season.

=== Bundesliga career (1970–72) ===
With Helmuth Johannsen's successor, Otto Knefler, the Lower Saxons had a surprisingly great campaign during the 1970–71 Bundesliga with Skrotzki being within the Starting XI at 27 league appearances and two goals. With ex-national striker Klaus Gerwien, he alternated on the right wing alongside centre-forward Jaro Deppe and left winger Dietmar Erler in Eintracht's attack. Braunschweig finished in 4th place at the end of the season with Skrotzki making his first 12 Bundesliga appearances as a substitute in the second half. His Bundesliga debut occurred on 23 January 1971 in the away game against Schalke that ended in a 0–1 defeat. However, the goal threat of midfielder Lothar Ulsaß with 18 goals, supported by Bernd Gersdorff, Max Lorenz and Michael Polywka, contributed significantly to their unexpected success. During the following 1971–72 season, he achieved only nine Bundesliga appearances due to the arrival of younger midfielders and forwards such as Ludwig Bründl, Jürgen Dudda and Hartmut Konschal as well as Skrotzki being implicated in the 1971 Bundesliga scandal, causing a fine of 4400 DM to be given.

=== Later years and 2. Bundesliga (1972–76) ===
Following the Bundesliga scandal, Skrotzki returned to the Regionalliga Süd with the newly promoted SpVgg Ludwigsburg. Under manager Gunther Baumann, he made his debut in a 2–1 away defeat against Frieburg on 29 July 1972. His career within Ludwigsburg was short-lived as he was soon replaced with former Karlsruher SC manager Kurt Sommerlatt and the Spielvereinigung also held Karlsruher to a 2–2 draw in front of 12,000 spectators in the home game on 17 March 1973. Around this point, Ludwigsburg was fighting to avoid relegation to the Amateurliga. With a 4–0 home win, Ludwigsburg ended the round on May 13 with 28-40 points. Skrotzki, who had mostly played in the midfield, had played in 27 league games and had scored four goals alongside teammates such as Peter Rübenach, Hans Mayer, Dieter Dollmann, Rainer Eisenhardt, Heinz Stickel, Hans Hägele, Rainer Lippert and Georg Beichle. However, despite all their efforts, a one-point deficit to Freiburg FC caused Ludwigsburg to be relegated to the Amateurliga in 16th place with Skrotzki signed a new contract with Schweinfurt 05.

With the Grün-Weißen from Lower Franconia, he completed the last season of the old, second-tier Regionalliga and finished 15th with his new club with Skrotzki scoring two goals in 26 Regionalliga games and despite their low ranking, Schweinfurt qualified for the inaugural 1974–75 2. Bundesliga season. During their debut 1974–75 season, the team from the Willy Sachs Stadium played an extremely good round under coach István Sztáni. Tied on points with runner-up FK Pirmasens, both had 48:28 points each, Schweinfurt eventually took 3rd place. Throughout his career with the club, Skrotzki formed the offensive formation of the club alongside Lothar Emmerich, Werner Seubert and Harald Aumeier with Skrotzki scoring six goals in 27 appearances. In the equally surprising relegation in the following 1975–76 season, he added another 27 games with two goals in the 2. Bundesliga. In the summer of 1976, after a total of 36 Bundesliga games (2 goals), 54 2nd Bundesliga games (8 goals) and 215 Regionalliga games, he retired following Schweinfurt's relegation.
