= 1965–66 Inter-Cities Fairs Cup =

Final positions
- Champions: (Spain) Barcelona (3rd title)
- Runners-up: (Spain) Zaragoza

Tournament statistics
- Matches played: 104

The eighth Inter-Cities Fairs Cup was played over the 1965–66 season. The competition was won by Barcelona over two legs in an all-Spanish final against Zaragoza. It was the sixth and final time that a Spanish side won the competition, and Barcelona's third title.

== First round ==
Team #1	Agg.	Team #2	1st leg	2nd leg	Playoff
Stade Français FC (France)	0–1	(Portugal) FC Porto	0–0	0–1
R. Antwerp F.C. (Belgium)	4–3	(Northern Ireland) Glentoran FC	1–0	3–3
DOS Utrecht (Netherlands)	1–7	(Spain) FC Barcelona	0–0	1–7
FC Girondins de Bordeaux (France)	1–10	Sporting Clube de Portugal	0–4	1–6
RFC Liegeois (Belgium)	1–2	(Socialist Federal Republic of Yugoslavia) NK Zagreb	1–0	0–2
Daring Brussels (Belgium)	1–3	(Sweden) AIK Fotboll	1–3	0–0
Malmö FF (Sweden)	0–7	(West Germany) TSV 1860 Munich	0–3	0–4
PAOK FC (Greece)	2–7	(Austria) Wiener Sportclub	2–1	0–6
Chelsea (England)	4–1	(Italy) Roma	4–1	0–0
Milan (Italy)	2–2	(France) RC Strasbourg	1–0	1–2	1–1 (a.e.t.) (c)
FK Red Star (Socialist Federal Republic of Yugoslavia)	1–7	(Italy) Fiorentina	0–4	1–3
Spartak Brno (Czechoslovakia)	2–1	(Bulgaria) Lokomotiv Plovdiv	2–0	0–1
Leeds United (England)	2–1	(Italy) Torino	2–1	0–0
Hibernian F.C. (Scotland)	2–2	(Spain) Valencia CF	2–0	0–2	0–3
US Luxembourg	0–17	(West Germany) 1. FC Köln	0–4	0–13
1. FC Nürnberg (West Germany)	1–2	(England) Everton	1–1	0–1

=== First leg ===
14 September 1965

Stade Français (France)	0–0	(Portugal) Porto

Parc des Princes, Paris
Attendance: 6,993
Referee: John Russell (Northern Ireland)

28 September 1965

R. Antwerp F.C. (Belgium)	1–0	(Northern Ireland) Glentoran FC
Van de Velde 85'

16 September 1965

DOS Utrecht (Netherlands)	0–0	(Spain) Barcelona

22 September 1965

Bordeaux (France)	0–4	(Portugal) Sporting CP
		Figureido 7', 87'; Duarte 47' da Silva 80'

8 September 1965

RFC Liege (Belgium)	1–0	(Socialist Federal Republic of Yugoslavia) NK Zagreb
Demarteau 15'

23 September 1965

Daring Brussels (Belgium)	1-3	(Sweden) AIK
Randoux 10'		Carlsson 17'; Nilden 27'; Backman 75'

15 September 1965

Malmo (Sweden)	0-3	(West Germany) TSV 1860 München
		Brunnenmeier 24'; Rebele 29'; Grosser 64'

15 September 1965

PAOK FC (Greece)	2–1	(Austria) Wiener Sportclub
Koudas 63'; Mouratidis 73'		Hof 67'

Kaftanzoglio Stadium, Thessaloniki

22 September 1965

Chelsea (England)	4–1	(Italy) Roma
Venables 32' 40' 46'; Graham 67'		Barison 34'

Stamford Bridge, London

22 September 1965

Milan (Italy)	1–0	(France) RC Strasbourg
Fortunato 41'

San Siro, Milan
Attendance: 17,500
Referee: Thomas Wharton (Scotland)

15 September 1965

FK Red Star (Socialist Federal Republic of Yugoslavia)	0–4	(Italy) Fiorentina
		Bertini 67' 86'; Hamrin 70'; Nuti 83'

Stadion FK Crvena Zvezda, Belgrade

28 September 1965

Spartak Brno (Czechoslovakia)	2–0	(Bulgaria) Lokomotiv Plovdiv
Chaloupka 25'; Vojta 52'

Brno
Attendance: 2,000
Referee: Marin (Romania)

29 September 1965

Leeds United (England)	2–1	(Italy) Torino
Bremner 25'; Peacock 48'		Orlando 78'

Elland Road, Leeds
Attendance: 33,852
Referee: Michel Kitabdjian (France)

8 September 1965

Hibernian F.C. (Scotland)	2–0	(Spain) Valencia CF
Scott 4'; McNamee 89'

8 September 1965

US Luxembourg	0–4	(West Germany) 1. FC Köln
	Report	Krauthausen 14', 80'; Thielen 28'; Löhr 35'

Stade Municipale, Luxembourg City
Attendance: 4,463
Referee: Gottfried Dienst (Switzerland)

28 September 1965

FC Nürnberg (West Germany)	1-1	(England) Everton
Greif 24'		Harris 50'

=== Second leg ===
5 October 1965

1. FC Köln (West Germany)	13–0	US Luxembourg
Thielen 2', 6', 23', 31'; Löhr 12', 15', 57'; Overath 16', 87'; Neumann 44', 78'; Müller 72'; Weber 88'	Report

Müngersdorfer Stadion, Cologne
Attendance: 4,448
Referee: Bengt Lundell (Sweden)

1. FC Köln won 17–0 on aggregate.

6 October 1965

Porto (Portugal)	1–0	(France) Stade Français
Manuel António 12'

Estádio das Antas, Porto
Attendance: 25,000
Referee: Antonio Sbardella (Italy)

Porto won 1–0 on aggregate.

6 October 1965

Glentoran FC (Northern Ireland)	3–3	(Belgium) R. Antwerp F.C.
Thompson 55', 60'; Hamilton 44'		Segers 12'; Van Moer 68'; Van de Velde 87'

Antwerp won 4–3 on aggregate.

29 September 1965

NK Zagreb (Socialist Federal Republic of Yugoslavia)	2–0	(Belgium) RFC Liege
Wacha 61'; Azinović 88'

Zagreb won 2–1 on aggregate

23 October 1965

Barcelona (Spain)	7-1	(Netherlands) DOS Utrecht
Verges 9'; Zaldua 11', 14', 54', 59', 82'; Pereda 84'		Van der Linden 28'

Barcelona won 7–1 on aggregate.

6 October 1965

Sporting CP (Portugal)	6-1	(France) Bordeaux
Lourenço 15', 78' da Silva 24' (pen.); Duarte 26'; Figureido 53'; Pinto 60'		Abossolo 48'

Sporting won 10–1 on aggregate.

19 October 1965

AIK (Sweden)	0–0	(Belgium) Daring Brussels

AIK won 3–1 on aggregate.

28 September 1965

TSV 1860 München (West Germany)	4–0	(Sweden) Malmo
Brunnenmeier 6'; Heiss 24'; Grosser 57'; Rebele 87'

TSV 1860 Munich won 7–0 on aggregate.

29 September 1965

Wiener Sportclub (Austria)	6-0	(Greece) PAOK FC
Hof 2' 26' 83' 90'; Gayer 13' 54'

Praterstadion, Vienna

Wiener won 8–2 on aggregate.

6 October 1965

Roma (Italy)	0–0	(England) Chelsea

Stadio Olimpico, Rome

Chelsea won 4–1 on aggregate.

27 October 1965

RC Strasbourg (France)	2–1	(Italy) Milan
Hauss 70' (pen.); Farías 89'		Benigni 59'

Stade de la Meinau, Strasbourg
Attendance: 21,000
Referee: Aníbal da Silva Oliveira (Portugal)

RC Strasbourg 2–2 Milan on aggregate; play-off needed.

22 September 1965

Fiorentina (Italy)	3–1	(Socialist Federal Republic of Yugoslavia) FK Red Star
Hamrin 6'; Pirovano 26'; Brugnera 48'		Milošević 42'

Stadio Comunale, Florence

Fiorentina won 7–1 on aggregate.

6 October 1965

Lokomotiv Plovdiv (Bulgaria)	1–0	(Czechoslovakia) Spartak Brno
Kanchev 40'

Attendance: 10,000
Referee: Stathatos (Greece)

Brno won 2–1 on aggregate.

6 October 1965

Torino (Italy)	0–0	(England) Leeds United

Stadio Comunale, Turin
Attendance: 26,000
Referee: Piet Roomer (Netherlands)

Leeds United won 2–1 on aggregate.

12 October 1965

Everton (England)	1-0	(West Germany) FC Nürnberg
Gabriel 63'

Everton won 2–1 on aggregate.

12 October 1965

Valencia CF (Spain)	2–0	(Scotland) Hibernian F.C.
Waldo 14'; Sánchez Lage 74' (pen.)

Valencia 2–2 Hibernian on aggregate; play-off needed.

=== Play-off ===
7 November 1965

Milan (Italy)	1–1 (a.e.t.)	(France) RC Strasbourg
Angelillo 59'		Szczepaniak 80'

San Siro, Milan
Attendance: 12,500
Referee: Dittmar Huber (Switzerland)

Milan 1–1 RC Strasbourg in play-off. Milan advanced on a coin toss.

3 November 1965

Valencia CF (Spain)	3–0	(Scotland) Hibernian F.C.
Juan Muñoz 11', 71'; Guillot 65'

Valencia won the play-off 3–0.

== Second round ==
Team #1	Agg.	Team #2	1st leg	2nd leg	Playoff
Hannover 96 (West Germany)	6–2	(Portugal) FC Porto	5–0	1–2
R. Antwerp F.C. (Belgium)	2–3	(Spain) FC Barcelona	2–1	0–2
Sporting Clube de Portugal	5–5	(Spain) RCD Espanyol	2–1	3–4	1–2
NK Zagreb (Socialist Federal Republic of Yugoslavia)	2–3	(Romania) Steagul Roșu Brasov	2–2	0–1
AIK Fotboll (Sweden)	3–5	(Switzerland) Servette FC	2–1	1–4
Göztepe A.Ş. (Turkey)	3–10	(West Germany) TSV 1860 Munich	2–1	1–9
Wiener Sportclub (Austria)	1–2	(England) Chelsea	1–0	0–2
GD CUF (Portugal)	2–2	(Italy) Milan	2–0	0–2	0–1
Dunfermline Athletic F.C. (Scotland)	9–2	(Denmark) B1903	5–0	4–2
Fiorentina (Italy)	2–4	(Czechoslovakia) Spartak Brno	2–0	0–4
Heart of Midlothian F.C. (Scotland)	4–1	(Norway) Vålerenga I.F.	1–0	3–1
Shamrock Rovers (Republic of Ireland)	2–3	(Spain) Zaragoza	1–1	1–2
SC Leipzig (East Germany)	1–2	(England) Leeds United	1–2	0–0
FC Basel (Switzerland)	2–8	(Spain) Valencia CF	1–3	1–5
Aris (Greece)	2–3	(West Germany) 1. FC Köln	2–1	0–2
Újpest FC (Hungary)	4–2	(England) Everton	3–0	1–2

=== First leg ===
10 November 1965

Hannover 96 (West Germany)	5–0	(Portugal) Porto
Rodekamp 4'; Siemensmeyer 6', 82'; Bandura 65'; Nix 73'

Niedersachsenstadion, Hannover
Attendance: 5,000
Referee: Einar Poulsen (Denmark)

17 November 1965

Royal Antwerp (Belgium)	2-1	(Spain) Barcelona
Silvestres 9' (o.g.); Segers 11'		Rife 41'

10 November 1965

Sporting CP (Portugal)	2-1	(Spain) Espanyol
Lourenço 62', 67'		Miralles 75'

17 November 1965

Zagreb (Socialist Federal Republic of Yugoslavia)	2–2	(Romania) Steagul Roșu Brașov
Wacha 65', 84'	Report	Goran 65'; Năftănăilă 83'

Stadion Maksimir, Zagreb
Attendance: 1,000
Referee: Sándor Petri (Hungary)

4 November 1965

AIK (Sweden)	2-1	(Switzerland) Servette
Backman 40'; Eriksson 41'		Schindelholz 57'

3 November 1965

Göztepe (Turkey)	2-1	(West Germany) TSV 1860 München
Kayalar 63'; Öznur 70'		Brunnenmeier 72'

17 November 1965

Shamrock Rovers (Republic of Ireland)	1–1	(Spain) Zaragoza
Tuohy 44'	Report	Reija 88'

Dalymount Park, Dublin
Attendance: 10,000
Referee: Marcel Deckx (Belgium)

1 December 1965

GD CUF (Portugal)	2–0	(Italy) Milan
Fernando 61'; Abalroado 89' (pen.)

Estádio Alfredo da Silva, Barreiro
Attendance: 12,500
Referee: Dittmar Huber (Switzerland)

24 November 1965

Fiorentina (Italy)	2–0	(Czechoslovakia) Spartak Brno
De Sisti 15'; Hamrin 89'

Stadio Comunale, Florence

24 November 1965

SC Leipzig (East Germany)	1–2	(England) Leeds United F.C.
Frenzel 83'		Lorimer 80'; Bremner 82'

Bruno-Plache-Stadion, Leipzig
Attendance: 8,000
Referee: Anton Buchelli (Switzerland)

24 November 1965

Basel (Switzerland)	1 – 3	(Spain) Valencia
Benthaus 7'		17', 80' Machado; 22' Muñoz

St. Jakob Stadium, Basel

=== Second leg ===
8 December 1965

Porto (Portugal)	2–1	(West Germany) Hannover 96
Manuel António 20'; Custódio Pinto 65' (pen.)		Nix 43'

Estádio das Antas, Porto
Attendance: 25,000
Referee: Manuel Gómez Arribas (Spain)

Hannover 96 won 6–2 on aggregate.

1 December 1965

Barcelona (Spain)	2-0	(Belgium) Royal Antwerp
Rife 10'; Zabella 50'

Barcelona won 3–2 on aggregate.

24 November 1965

Espanyol (Spain)	4-3	(Portugal) Sporting CP
Jose Maria Garcia 57' (pen.); Miralles 65'; Rodilla 70', 72'		Lourenço 26'; Figueiredo 34'; Duarte 48'

Sporting 5-5 Espanyol; play-of needed

24 November 1965

Steagul Roșu Brașov (Romania)	1–0	(Socialist Federal Republic of Yugoslavia) Zagreb
Hașoti 14'	Report

Stadionul Tractorul, Brașov
Attendance: 3,200
Referee: Pavel Spotak (Czechoslovakia)

Steagul Roșu Brașov won 3–2 on aggregate.

13 November 1965

Servette (Switzerland)	4-1	(Sweden) AIK
Georgy 1'; Makay 21'; Nemeth 64'; Daina 67'		Eriksson 50'

Servette won 5–3 on aggregate.

23 November 1965

TSV 1860 München (West Germany)	9-1	(Turkey) Göztepe
Rebele 1', 29', 58'; Konietzka 5', 36', 58', 65'; Radenković 5' (pen.); Hess 87'		Öznur 6'

TSV 1860 won 10–3 on aggregate.

24 November 1965

Zaragoza (Spain)	2–1	(Republic of Ireland) Shamrock Rovers
Santos 11'; Canário 77'	Report	Fullam 22'

La Romareda, Zaragoza
Attendance: 18,700
Referee: Günther Baumgärtel (West Germany)

Zaragoza won 3–2 on aggregate.

1 December 1965

Leeds United (England)	0–0	(East Germany) SC Leipzig

Elland Road, Leeds
Attendance: 32,111
Referee: Albert Boogaerts (Holland)

Leeds won 2–1 on aggregate.

8 December 1965

Milan (Italy)	2–0	(Portugal) GD CUF
Sormani 18' (pen.); Angelillo 87'

San Siro, Milan
Attendance: 9,500
Referee: Normand Mootz (Luxembourg)

Milan 2–2 GD CUF on aggregate; play-off needed

5 December 1965

Spartak Brno (Czechoslovakia)	4–0	(Italy) Fiorentina
Hradský 29' 70'; Lichtnégl 79' 83'

Brno

Spartak Brno won 4–2 on aggregate.

8 December 1965

Valencia (Spain)	5 – 1	(Switzerland) Basel
Machado 1', 80'; Urtiaga 17'; Muñoz 31'; Guillot 32'		Hauser 7'

Mestalla Stadium, Valencia

Valencia won 8–2 on aggregate.

=== Play-off ===
15 December 1965

Espanyol (Spain)	2-1	(Portugal) Sporting CP
Rodilla 36', 45'		Lourenço 37'

Espanyol won the play-off 2-1

29 December 1965

Milan (Italy)	1–0	(Portugal) GD CUF
Lodetti 76'

San Siro, Milan
Attendance: 6,400
Referee: Gerhard Schulenburg (West Germany)

Milan won 1–0 in play-off.

== Third round ==
Team #1	Agg.	Team #2	1st leg	2nd leg	Playoff
Hannover 96 (West Germany)	2–2	(Spain) FC Barcelona	2–1	0–1	1–1 (a.e.t.) (c)
RCD Espanyol (Spain)	5–5	(Romania) Steagul Roșu Brasov	3–1	2–4	1–0
Servette FC (Switzerland)	2–5	(West Germany) TSV 1860 Munich	1–1	1–4
Milan (Italy)	3–3	(England) Chelsea	2–1	1–2	1–1 (a.e.t.) (c)
Dunfermline Athletic F.C. (Scotland)	2–0	(Czechoslovakia) Spartak Brno	2–0	0–0
Heart of Midlothian F.C. (Scotland)	5–5	(Spain) Zaragoza	3–3	2–2	0–1
Leeds United (England)	2–1	(Spain) Valencia CF	1–1	1–0
1. FC Köln (West Germany)	3–6	(Hungary) Újpest FC	3–2	0–4

=== First leg ===
26 January 1966

Espanyol (Spain)	3–1	(Romania) Steagul Roșu Brașov
Amas 59', 82', 87'	Report	Zaharia 62'

Estadi Sarriá, Barcelona
Attendance: 14,800
Referee: Francesco Francescon (Italy)

2 February 1966

Hannover 96 (West Germany)	2–1	(Spain) FC Barcelona
Siemensmeyer 27', 54'		Zaldua 44'

8 February 1966

Servette FC (Switzerland)	1–1	(West Germany) TSV 1860 München
Daina 89'		Konietzka 39'

9 February 1966

Milan (Italy)	2–1	(England) Chelsea
Amarildo 58'; Rivera 75'		Graham 89'

San Siro, Milan
Attendance: 11,411
Referee: Rudolf Kreitlein (West Germany)

26 January 1966

Dunfermline Athletic (Scotland)	2–0	(Czechoslovakia) Spartak Brno
Paton 60'; Ferguson 90' (pen.)

East End Park, Dunfermline
Attendance: 15,000
Referee: Davies (Wales)

12 January 1966

Hearts (Scotland)	3-3	(Spain) Real Zaragoza
Anderson 50'; Wallace 57'; Kerrigan 79'		Lapetra 10', 86'; Enderiz 29'

2 February 1966

Leeds United (England)	1–1	(Spain) Valencia CF
Lorimer 64'		Múñoz 17'

Elland Road, Leeds
Attendance: 34,414
Referee: Leo Horn (Holland)

2 February 1966

FC Köln (West Germany)	3-2	(Hungary) Újpest FC
Löhr 18', 31'; Sturm 43'		Göröcs 30'; Solymosi 85' (pen.)

=== Second leg ===
16 February 1966

Steagul Roșu Brașov (Romania)	4–2	(Spain) Espanyol
Pescaru 23'; Ivăncescu 52', 60' (pen.); Goran 80'	Report	Vilaseca 21'; José María 49'

Stadionul Tractorul, Brașov
Attendance: 13,800
Referee: Stjepan Varaždinec (Yugoslavia)

Steagul Roșu 5–5 Espanyol on aggregate, play-off required.

16 February 1966

FC Barcelona (Spain)	1-0	(West Germany) Hannover 96
Fuste 61'

Barcelona 2-2 Hannover on aggregate, play-off required.

15 February 1966

TSV 1860 München (West Germany)	4–1	(Switzerland) Servette FC
Konietzka 16'; Grosser 35'; Brunnenmeier 58', 87'		Georgy 40'

TSV 1860 won 5–2 on aggregate

16 February 1966

Chelsea (England)	2–1	(Italy) Milan
Graham 9'; Osgood 18'		Sormani 43'

Stamford Bridge, London
Attendance: 59,541
Referee: Rudolf Glöckner (East Germany)

Chelsea 3–3 Milan on aggregate, play-off required

16 February 1966

Spartak Brno (Czechoslovakia)	0–0	(Scotland) Dunfermline Athletic

Stadion Za Lužánkami, Brno
Attendance: 5,000
Referee: Köpke (East Germany)

Dunfermline won 2–0 on aggregate.

26 January 1966

Real Zaragoza (Spain)	2-2	(Scotland) Hearts
Santos 5'; Martinez 21'		Anderson 27'; Wallace 77'

Hearts 2-2 Zaragoza, play-off required.

16 February 1966

Valencia CF (Spain)	0–1	(England) Leeds United
		O'Grady 75'

Estadio Mestalla, Valencia
Attendance: 45,000
Referee: Othmar Huber (Switzerland)

Leeds won 2–1 on aggregate.

16 February 1966

Újpest FC (Hungary)	4–0	(West Germany) FC Köln
Dunai 13'; Bene 46', 70'; Kuharszky 62'

Ujpset won 6–3 on aggregate

=== Play-off ===
2 March 1966

Steagul Roșu Brașov (Romania)	0–1	(Spain) Espanyol
	Report	Ré 54'

Stadionul Tractorul, Brașov
Attendance: 13,000
Referee: Othmar Huber (Switzerland)

2 March 1966

Hannover 96 (West Germany)	1–1	(Spain) FC Barcelona
Bandura 11'		Pujol 88'

Barcelona qualified on a coin toss

2 March 1966

Milan (Italy)	1–1	(England) Chelsea
Fortunato 90'		Bridges 10'

San Siro, Milan
Attendance: 35,000
Referee: Günter Baumgärtel (West Germany)

Milan 1–1 Chelsea in play-off. Chelsea advanced on a coin toss.

2 March 1966

Real Zaragoza (Spain)	1-0	(Scotland) Hearts
Martinez 80'

== Quarter-finals ==
Team 1	Agg.	Team 2	1st leg	2nd leg
FC Barcelona (Spain)	2–0	(Spain) RCD Espanyol	1–0	1–0
TSV 1860 Munich (West Germany)	2–3	(England) Chelsea	2–2	0–1
Dunfermline Athletic F.C. (Scotland)	3–4	(Spain) Zaragoza	1–0	2–4
Leeds United (England)	5–2	(Hungary) Újpest FC	4–1	1–1

=== First leg ===
16 March 1966

Barcelona (Spain)	1–0	(Spain) Espanyol
Benitez 44'

15 March 1966

TSV 1860 München (West Germany)	2-2	(England) Chelsea
Grosser 35'; Konietzka 16'		Tambling 35', 55'

16 March 1966

Dunfermline Athletic (Scotland)	1–0	(Spain) Real Zaragoza
Paton 87'

2 March 1966

Leeds United (England)	4–1	(Hungary) Újpest FC
Cooper 6'; Bell 35'; Storrie 42'; Bremner 43'		Antal Dunai 74'

Elland Road, Leeds
Attendance: 40,462
Referee: Gerhard Schulenburg (West Germany)

=== Second leg ===
23 March 1966

Espanyol (Spain)	0-1	(Spain) Barcelona
		Vidal 49'

Barcelona won 2–0 on aggregate.

29 March 1966

Chelsea (England)	1–0	(West Germany) TSV 1860 München
Osgood 78'

Chelsea won 3–2 on aggregate.

30 March 1966

Real Zaragoza (Spain)	4-2	(Scotland) Dunfermline Athletic
Santos 57'; Martinez 83'; Villa 92', 118'		Ferguson 89'; Lunn 102'

Zaragoza won 4–3 on aggregate.

9 March 1966

Újpest FC (Hungary)	1–1	(England) Leeds United
Laszlo Fazekas 38'		Lorimer 72'

Megyeri úti Stadium, Budapest
Attendance: 30,000
Referee: Gottfried Dienst (Switzerland)

Leeds won 5–2 on aggregate.

== Semi-finals ==
Team #1	Agg.	Team #2	1st leg	2nd leg	Playoff
FC Barcelona (Spain)	2–2	(England) Chelsea	2–0	0–2	5–0
Zaragoza (Spain)	2–2	(England) Leeds United	1–0	1–2	3–1

=== First leg ===
20 April 1966

Zaragoza (Spain)	1–0	(England) Leeds United
Carlos Lapetra 60' (pen.)

La Romareda, Zaragoza
Attendance: 35,000
Referee: Marcel Bois (France)
27 April 1966

FC Barcelona (Spain)	2–0	(England) Chelsea
Fusté 34'; Zaldúa 89'

Camp Nou, Barcelona
Attendance: 70,000
Referee: Karl Keller (Switzerland)

=== Second leg ===
27 April 1966

Leeds United (England)	2–1	(Spain) Zaragoza
Johanneson 23'; Charlton 63'		Canário 60'

Elland Road, Leeds
Attendance: 45,008
Referee: Piet Roomer (Holland)

Leeds – Zaragoza 2–2 on aggregate, replay is needed. Leeds won toss to play at home

11 May 1966

Leeds United (England)	1–3	(Spain) Zaragoza
Charlton 80'		Marcelino 1'; Violeta 5'; Brito 13'

Elland Road, Leeds
Attendance: 43,046
Referee: Hans Carlsson (Sweden)

Zaragoza won 5–3 on aggregate.

11 May 1966

Chelsea (England)	2–0	(Spain) FC Barcelona
Torres 70' (o.g.); Reina 76' (o.g.)

Stamford Bridge, London
Attendance: 40,073
Referee: Othmar Huber (Switzerland)

Chelsea – Barcelona 2–2 on aggregate, replay is needed. Barcelona won toss to play at home

25 May 1966

FC Barcelona (Spain)	5–0	(England) Chelsea
Fusté 5', 74'; Zaballa 18'; Rifé 43', 50'

Camp Nou, Barcelona
Attendance: 40,000
Referee: Kurt Tschenscher (Germany)

Barcelona won 7–2 on aggregate.

== Final ==
Team 1	Agg.	Team 2	1st leg	2nd leg
FC Barcelona (Spain)	4–3	(Spain) Zaragoza	0–1	4–2 (a.e.t.)
