= 1968–69 FC Bayern Munich season =

4th season of Bayern Munich in the Bundesliga

Bayern Munich
1968–69 season
- Manager: Branko Zebec
- Bundesliga: 1st (champion)
- DFB-Pokal: Champion
- Top goalscorer: League: Gerd Müller (30 goals); All: Gerd Müller (37 goals)
Home colours	Away colours	Third colours

The 1968–69 FC Bayern Munich season was the club's 4th season in Bundesliga.

== Review and events ==
Bayern won the championship of the Bundesliga. They also won the cup, defeating Schalke 04 2–1 in the final.

== Match results ==
=== Legend ===
Win Draw Loss

=== Bundesliga ===
==== League fixtures and results ====
17 August 1968 1	Bayern Munich	2–0	1. FC Kaiserslautern	Munich
15:30 CET	Ohlhauser 7'; Rehhagel 18' (o.g.)	Report		Stadium: Grünwalder Stadion; Attendance: 14,000; Referee: Gerd Hennig

24 August 1968 2	1860 Munich	0–3	Bayern Munich	Munich
15:30 CET		Report	Roth 9'; Müller 23', 90' (pen.)	Stadium: Grünwalder Stadion; Attendance: 44,000; Referee: Alfred Ott

31 August 1968 3	Bayern Munich	5–1	Hamburger SV	Munich
15:30 CET	Müller 28', 57' (pen.), 84', 88'; Starek 62'	Report	Seeler 78'	Stadium: Grünwalder Stadion; Attendance: 16,000; Referee: Gerd Siepe

4 September 1968 4	FC Schalke 04	1–2	Bayern Munich	Gelsenkirchen
20:00 CET	Senger 29'	Report	Müller 35'; Ohlhauser 52'	Stadium: Glückauf-Kampfbahn; Attendance: 40,000; Referee: Diedrich Basedow

7 September 1968 5	Bayern Munich	3–0	Hertha BSC	Munich
15:30 CET	Starek 8'; Müller 13'; Ohlhauser 30'	Report		Stadium: Grünwalder Stadion; Attendance: 29,000; Referee: Edgar Deuschel

14 September 1968 6	Eintracht Frankfurt	1–1	Bayern Munich	Frankfurt
15:30 CET	Grabowski 17' (pen.)	Report	Müller 29'	Stadium: Waldstadion; Attendance: 60,000; Referee: Walter Eschweiler

9 December 1967 7	Bayern Munich	2–2	MSV Duisburg	Munich
15:30 CET	Müller 10' (pen.); Brenninger 81'	Report	Budde 27'; Pavlić 73' (pen.)	Stadium: Grünwalder Stadion; Attendance: 14,000; Referee: Helmut Fritz

28 September 1968 8	Eintracht Braunschweig	2–3	Bayern Munich	Braunschweig
15:30 CET	Deppe 34', 89'	Report	Starek 41'; Müller 51', 85'	Stadium: Eintracht-Stadion; Attendance: 36,500; Referee: Hans Hillebrand

5 October 1968 9	Bayern Munich	2–0	VfB Stuttgart	Munich
15:30 CET	Müller 46', 89'	Report		Stadium: Grünwalder Stadion; Attendance: 33,000; Referee: Gerhard Schulenburg

19 October 1968 10	Alemannia Aachen	2–4	Bayern Munich	Aachen
15:30 CET	Kapellmann 23'; Sell 58'	Report	Ohlhauser 4', 33', 54'; Müller 88'	Stadium: Old Tivoli; Attendance: 30,000; Referee: Horst Herden

26 October 1968 11	Werder Bremen	1–0	Bayern Munich	Bremen
15:30 CET	Steinmann 85'	Report		Stadium: Weserstadion; Attendance: 35,000; Referee: Alfred Köhler

30 October 1968 12	Bayern Munich	4–1	Borussia Dortmund	Munich
20:00 CET	Müller 23', 39'; Brenninger 67'; Olk 74'	Report	Emmerich 80'	Stadium: Grünwalder Stadion; Attendance: 30,000; Referee: Jan Redelfs

2 November 1968 13	1. FC Köln	1–1	Bayern Munich	Cologne
15:30 CET	Löhr 40'	Report	Ohlhauser 46'	Stadium: Müngersdorfer Stadion; Attendance: 43,000; Referee: Bruno Schulz

12 November 1968 14	Bayern Munich	3–0	1. FC Nürnberg	Munich
20:00 CET	Müller 45', 60', 82' (pen.)	Report		Stadium: Grünwalder Stadion; Attendance: 40,000; Referee: Gerd Siepe

16 November 1968 15	Kickers Offenbach	0–0	Bayern Munich	Offenbach
15:30 CET		Report		Stadium: Stadion am Bieberer Berg; Attendance: 30,000; Referee: Karl-Heinz Picker

30 November 1968 16	Bayern Munich	0–0	Borussia Mönchengladbach	Munich
18:30 CET		Report		Stadium: Grünwalder Stadion; Attendance: 35,000; Referee: Horst Herden

13 January 1968 17	Hannover 96	1–0	Bayern Munich	Hannover
15:30 CET	Siemensmeyer 50'	Report	Müller (red card) 53'	Stadium: Niedersachsenstadion; Attendance: 40,000; Referee: Wilfried Hilker

11 January 1969 18	1. FC Kaiserslautern	3–1	Bayern Munich	Kaiserslautern
15:30 CET	Hasebrink 19', 82' (pen.); Kentschke 38'	Report	Ohlhauser 59'	Stadium: Betzenbergstadion; Attendance: 25,000; Referee: Walter Horstmann

18 January 1969 19	Bayern Munich	0–2	1860 Munich	Munich
15:30 CET		Report	Reich 63'; Fischer 77'	Stadium: Grünwalder Stadion; Attendance: 38,000; Referee: Hans-Joachim Weyland

25 January 1969 20	Hamburger SV	2–2	Bayern Munich	Hamburg
15:30 CET	Dörfel 4'; Seeler 75'	Report	Brenninger 26', 69'	Stadium: Volksparkstadion; Attendance: 50,000; Referee: Gerd Hennig

1 February 1969 21	Bayern Munich	0–0	FC Schalke 04	Munich
15:30 CET		Report	Pohlschmidt (penalty missed) 41'	Stadium: Grünwalder Stadion; Attendance: 17,000; Referee: Rudolf Schröck

8 February 1969 22	Hertha BSC	1–2	Bayern Munich	Berlin
15:00 CET	Brungs 5'	Report	Müller 41', 79'	Stadium: Olympic Stadium; Attendance: 38,000; Referee: Ferdinand Biwersi

22 February 1969 23	Bayern Munich	2–0	Eintracht Frankfurt	Munich
15:30 CET	Brenninger 30'; Roth 42'	Report		Stadium: Grünwalder Stadion; Attendance: 20,000; Referee: Jan Redelfs

1 March 1969 24	MSV Duisburg	0–0	Bayern Munich	Duisburg
15:30 CET	Djordje Pavlić (penalty missed) 76'	Report		Stadium: Wedaustadion; Attendance: 32,000; Referee: Oswald Fritz

8 March 1969 25	Bayern Munich	2–1	Eintracht Braunschweig	Munich
15:30 CET	Brenninger 24'; Ohlhauser 72'	Report	Dörfel 30'	Stadium: Grünwalder Stadion; Attendance: 40,000; Referee: Walter Eschweiler

15 March 1969 26	VfB Stuttgart	3–0	Bayern Munich	Stuttgart
15:30 CET	Menne 8'; Larsson 43'; Haug 78'	Report		Stadium: Neckarstadion; Attendance: 74,000; Referee: Karl-Heinz Fork

22 March 1969 27	Bayern Munich	1–1	Alemannia Aachen	Munich
15:30 CET	Brenninger 64'	Report	Klostermann 20'	Stadium: Grünwalder Stadion; Attendance: 18,500; Referee: Klaus Ohmsen

29 March 1969 28	Bayern Munich	6–0	Werder Bremen	Munich
15:30 CET	Starek 4'; Schmidt 62'; Ohlhauser 48'; Müller 54', 66'; Beckenbauer 85'	Report		Stadium: Grünwalder Stadion; Attendance: 17,000; Referee: Gerd Hennig

19 April 1969 29	Borussia Dortmund	0–1	Bayern Munich	Dortmund
15:30 CET		Report	Schmidt 89'	Stadium: Stadion Rote Erde; Attendance: 37,000; Referee: Helmut Fritz

26 April 1969 30	Bayern Munich	1–0	1. FC Köln	Munich
15:30 CET	Müller 64'	Report		Stadium: Grünwalder Stadion; Attendance: 27,000; Referee: Horst Herden

17 May 1969 31	1. FC Nürnberg	2–0	Bayern Munich	Nuremberg
15:30 CET	Volkert 22', 28'	Report		Stadium: Städtisches Stadion; Attendance: 45,000; Referee: Fritz Seiler

24 May 1969 32	Bayern Munich	5–1	Kickers Offenbach	Munich
15:30 CET	Müller 3', 24', 38'; Beckenbauer 19'; Brenninger 86'	Report	Resenberg 45'	Stadium: Grünwalder Stadion; Attendance: 15,000; Referee: Hans Hillebrand

31 May 1969 33	Borussia Mönchengladbach	1–1	Bayern Munich	Mönchengladbach
15:30 CET	Laumen 10'	Report	Brenninger 30'	Stadium: Bökelbergstadion; Attendance: 19,500; Referee: Klaus Ohmsen

7 June 1969 34	Bayern Munich	2–1	Hannover 96	Munich
15:30 CET	Müller 45', 65' (pen.)	Report	Ritter 25'	Stadium: Grünwalder Stadion; Attendance: 18,000; Referee: Paul Kindervater

==== League standings ====
Pos	Team	Pld	W	D	L	GF	GA	GR	Pts	Qualification or relegation
1	Bayern Munich (C)	34	18	10	6	61	31	1.968	46	Qualification to European Cup first round
2	Alemannia Aachen	34	16	6	12	57	51	1.118	38	
3	Borussia Mönchengladbach	34	13	11	10	61	46	1.326	37	
4	Eintracht Braunschweig	34	13	11	10	46	43	1.070	37	
5	VfB Stuttgart	34	14	8	12	60	54	1.111	36	Qualification to Inter-Cities Fairs Cup first round

Source: www.dfb.de
Rules for classification: 1) points; 2) goal ratio.
(C) Champions

=== DFB-Pokal ===
5 February 1969 1st Round	Bayern Munich	0–0 (a.e.t.)	Kickers Offenbach	Munich
CET		Report		Stadium: Grünwalder Stadion; Attendance: 12,000; Referee: Paul Kindervater

11 February 1969 1st Round Replay	Kickers Offenbach	0–1	Bayern Munich	Offenbach
CET		Report	Müller 51'	Stadium: Stadion am Bieberer Berg; Attendance: 25,000; Referee: Günter Linn

15 February 1969 Round of 16	Bayern Munich	1–0	Arminia Hannover	Munich
CET	Ohlhauser 84'	Report		Stadium: Grünwalder Stadion; Attendance: 6,000; Referee: Norbert Fuchs

4 March 1969 Quarterfinals	Hamburger SV	0–2	Bayern Munich	Hamburg
20:00 CET		Report	Müller 12', 81'	Stadium: Volksparkstadion; Attendance: 64,500; Referee: Walter Eschweiler

3 May 1969 Semifinals	Bayern Munich	2–0	1. FC Nürnberg	Munich
15:30 CET	Müller 63', 79'	Report		Stadium: Grünwalder Stadion; Attendance: 25,000; Referee: Johannes Malka

14 June 1969 Final	Bayern Munich	2–1	FC Schalke 04	Frankfurt
16:00 CET	Müller 13', 35'	Report	Pohlschmidt 19'	Stadium: Waldstadion; Attendance: 64,000; Referee: Helmut Fritz
