= Lower Saxony derby =

German Football Derby

- Native name: Niedersachsenderby
- Location: Lower Saxony, Germany
- Teams: Hannover 96; Eintracht Braunschweig
- Latest meeting: Braunschweig 2–0 Hannover; 2. Bundesliga (25 October 2026)
- Next meeting: Hannover v Braunschweig; 2. Bundesliga (12–14 March 2027)
- Stadiums: Heinz von Heiden Arena, Hanover; Eintracht-Stadion, Braunschweig

Statistics
- Total meetings: 161
- Most wins: Eintracht Braunschweig (70)
- Most player appearances: Jürgen Bandura (18)
- Top scorer: Hannes Tkotz (10 goals)
- Largest victory: Braunschweig 5–0 Hannover; Oberliga Nord (21 September 1947)
- Location of the clubs' stadiums

The Lower Saxony derby (German: Niedersachsenderby [ˈniːdɐzaksn̩ˌdɛʁbi, -ˌdœːɐ̯bi]) usually refers to a match between the two Lower Saxonian association football clubs Hannover 96 and Eintracht Braunschweig. As of October 2026, 161 such matches have taken place: Eintracht Braunschweig won 70, Hannover 96 won 60, and 31 matches ended in a draw.

== Description ==
The cities of Hanover and Braunschweig are 55 km (34 mi) apart. In the media, matches of the two teams against VfL Wolfsburg and in part also against VfL Osnabrück are called Lower Saxony derbies; this view is not shared by many supporters and club officials.

== History ==
=== The beginnings (1905–1963) ===
Eintracht Braunschweig was founded in 1895, Hannover 96 one year later as Hannoverscher Fußball-Club. The first match between the two teams took place in the first decade of the 1900s. Hannover 96 won the German championship in 1938 and 1954. Until the 1962–63 season, Braunschweig won 54 matches, with Hannover winning 38 matches and 14 matches ending in a draw.

=== Foundation of the Bundesliga in 1963: Birth of the sports rivalry ===
After the decision to create a nationwide Bundesliga, three clubs from the Oberliga Nord were permitted to participate in the Bundesliga. Since Hamburger SV and Werder Bremen were directly admitted to the Bundesliga, only one free spot remained. Since Hannover 96 had the larger stadium, the higher average attendance and better financial prerequisites and was also ranked higher than Braunschweig in the German Football Association's twelve-year ranking, Hannover's officials were sure that they would receive the spot in the Bundesliga. Still, Braunschweig was awarded the spot on 6 May 1963, for which the only criterion was their final position in the 1962–63 season: while Hannover 96 finished in ninth place, Braunschweig had come in third. In Hanover, the decision was met with incomprehension and provoked major protests. However, the official lawsuit against the licensing was dismissed. Many see the circumstances of the Bundesliga foundation as the cause or at least as a reinforcement of the rivalry between the clubs and their supporters.

Eintracht Braunschweig won the German championship in the 1966–67 season, but lost both season matches against Hannover 96.

=== Present day ===
In the recent past, the duels between Hannover and Braunschweig have become a rarity due to league affiliation. In the 1996–97 and 1997–98 seasons, when Hannover 96 was relegated to the third-tier Regionalliga, both clubs played for the championship and the promotion play-offs until the end of the season; Hannover 96 won the championship in the Regionalliga Nord both seasons. In 1998, the championship was decided through a win in the direct duel on the second-to-last matchday. A similar situation also occurred in the 2016–17 season, when Hannover was relegated to the 2. Bundesliga after 14 years in the Bundesliga and duelled Eintracht Braunschweig for a direct promotion spot until the last matchday. Hannover's win in the match against Braunschweig on the 29th matchday was co-deciding in this season. Braunschweig's last win against Hannover dates back to the 29th matchday of the 2013–14 Bundesliga season. However, the club was relegated at the end of the season, while Hannover remained in the Bundesliga.

In recent years, matches between the two clubs are always classified as high-risk matches by the police and extensive security measures are taken to contain the always massive riots of the fans during the derby.

=== Other Lower Saxony derbies ===
The matches of Hannover 96 and Eintracht Braunschweig against VfL Wolfsburg are also occasionally called Lower Saxony derbies, since VfL Wolfsburg is also based in Lower Saxony and has played in the Bundesliga since 1997. However, in public perception these matches are only seen as "real" derbies to a lesser extent, since especially the fan scenes of the other two clubs do not view Wolfsburg as a "real" club that is rich in tradition. The 2017 Bundesliga promotion/relegation play-offs between Braunschweig and Wolfsburg, both cities only 30 km (19 mi) apart, were an exception as they were unusually charged due to the high stakes.

SV Meppen, which played in the 2. Bundesliga for a while in the 1990s, also played a few derbies against the Lower Saxonian northwestern rivals VfL Osnabrück and VfB Oldenburg as well as the then second-tier clubs Hannover 96 and Eintracht Braunschweig. Other teams that have played second-tier Lower Saxony derbies since the 1970s were Olympia Wilhelmshaven, Göttingen 05, Arminia Hannover, OSV Hannover and TSV Havelse.

== Trivia ==
Before the match in Hanover during the first half of the 2013–14 Bundesliga season, Braunschweig supporters provoked the home fans with a pig that ran through the Hanover city centre wearing a Hannover club scarf and with the number 96 painted onto its side. Also, crosses were put up in the Braunschweig area and supporters of both clubs initiated vigilante groups in front of their stadiums. Furthermore, a brewery from Braunschweig was Hannover's shirt sponsor in the 1980s. Eintracht Braunschweig supporters avoid saying the club name "Hannover 96" and also the number 96, which is replaced with "95+1".

== Head-to-head ==
As of 25 October 2026

=== Statistics ===
League
Competition	Played	Eintracht Braunschweig wins	Draws	Hannover 96 wins	Eintracht Braunschweig goals	Hannover 96 goals
Bundesliga	22	6	8	8	30	34
2. Bundesliga	21	6	4	11	16	27
2. Bundesliga Nord	4	1	2	1	5	5
Oberliga Nord	28	13	5	10	48	44
Regionalliga Nord	4	1	1	2	4	8
League total	79	27	20	32	103	118
Cup
DFB-Pokal	2	1	0	1	3	3
DFL-Ligapokal	2	2	0	0	4	2
Fußballmeisterschaft	1	1	0	0	3	2
Cup total	5	4	0	1	10	7
Total	82	30	20	32	111	122

=== List of matches ===
As of 25 October 2026
League

#	Season	Date	Competition	Stadium	Home Team	Result	Away Team	Attendance	H2H
1	1947–48	21 September 1947	Oberliga Nord	Eintracht-Stadion	TSV Braunschweig	5–0	Hannover	–	+1
2	1947–48	11 January 1948	Oberliga Nord	Radrennbahn	Hannover	3–1	TSV Braunschweig	–	0
3	1949–50	2 October 1949	Oberliga Nord	Radrennbahn	Hannover	2–1	Braunschweig	10,000	+1
4	1949–50	26 March 1950	Oberliga Nord	Eintracht-Stadion	Braunschweig	3–1	Hannover	8,000	0
5	1950–51	19 November 1950	Oberliga Nord	Eintracht-Stadion	Braunschweig	5–2	Hannover	6,000	+1
6	1950–51	28 January 1951	Oberliga Nord	Radrennbahn	Hannover	0–0	Braunschweig	10,000	+1
7	1951–52	9 October 1951	Oberliga Nord	Eintracht-Stadion	Braunschweig	3–3	Hannover	10,000	+1
8	1951–52	16 March 1952	Oberliga Nord	Radrennbahn	Hannover	3–1	Braunschweig	8,000	0
9	1953–54	6 September 1953	Oberliga Nord	Eintracht-Stadion	Braunschweig	1–5	Hannover	25,000	+1
10	1953–54	14 February 1954	Oberliga Nord	Radrennbahn	Hannover	0–2	Braunschweig	23,000	0
11	1954–55	12 December 1954	Oberliga Nord	Eintracht-Stadion	Braunschweig	1–0	Hannover	25,000	+1
12	1954–55	30 January 1955	Oberliga Nord	Niedersachsenstadion	Hannover	1–2	Braunschweig	27,000	+2
13	1955–56	11 December 1955	Oberliga Nord	Eintracht-Stadion	Braunschweig	3–2	Hannover	15,000	+3
14	1955–56	8 January 1956	Oberliga Nord	Niedersachsenstadion	Hannover	2–1	Braunschweig	18,000	+2
15	1956–57	14 October 1956	Oberliga Nord	Niedersachsenstadion	Hannover	2–0	Braunschweig	21,000	+1
16	1956–57	24 February 1957	Oberliga Nord	Eintracht-Stadion	Braunschweig	0–1	Hannover	16,000	0
17	1957–58	17 November 1957	Oberliga Nord	Niedersachsenstadion	Hannover	6–2	Braunschweig	15,000	+1
18	1957–58	2 March 1958	Oberliga Nord	Eintracht-Stadion	Braunschweig	2–0	Hannover	18,000	0
19	1958–59	7 December 1958	Oberliga Nord	Niedersachsenstadion	Hannover	1–1	Braunschweig	18,000	0
20	1958–59	25 January 1959	Oberliga Nord	Eintracht-Stadion	Braunschweig	2–1	Hannover	15,000	+1
21	1959–60	30 August 1959	Oberliga Nord	Eintracht-Stadion	Braunschweig	1–0	Hannover	30,000	+2
22	1959–60	3 April 1960	Oberliga Nord	Niedersachsenstadion	Hannover	2–0	Braunschweig	20,000	+1
23	1960–61	18 September 1960	Oberliga Nord	Niedersachsenstadion	Hannover	21	Braunschweig	7,000	0
24	1960–61	1 April 1961	Oberliga Nord	Eintracht-Stadion	Braunschweig	1–0	Hannover	6,000	+1
25	1961–62	15 October 1961	Oberliga Nord	Eintracht-Stadion	Braunschweig	2–2	Hannover	16,000	+1
26	1961–62	4 March 1962	Oberliga Nord	Niedersachsenstadion	Hannover	3–3	Braunschweig	6,500	+1
27	1962–63	14 October 1962	Oberliga Nord	Eintracht-Stadion	Braunschweig	3–0	Hannover	10,000	+2
28	1962–63	10 February 1963	Oberliga Nord	Niedersachsenstadion	Hannover	0–1	Braunschweig	12,000	+3
29	1964–65	26 September 1964	Bundesliga	Niedersachsenstadion	Hannover	2–2	Braunschweig	57,000	+3
30	1964–65	13 February 1965	Bundesliga	Eintracht-Stadion	Braunschweig	2–2	Hannover	30,000	+3
31	1965–66	11 September 1965	Bundesliga	Eintracht-Stadion	Braunschweig	2–1	Hannover	33,000	+4
32	1965–66	7 April 1966	Bundesliga	Niedersachsenstadion	Hannover	1–1	Braunschweig	41,000	+4
33	1966–67	12 November 1966	Bundesliga	Niedersachsenstadion	Hannover	4–2	Braunschweig	43,000	+3
34	1966–67	29 April 1967	Bundesliga	Eintracht-Stadion	Braunschweig	0–1	Hannover	35,000	+2
35	1967–68	14 October 1967	Bundesliga	Niedersachsenstadion	Hannover	1–1	Braunschweig	48,000	+2
36	1967–68	16 March 1968	Bundesliga	Eintracht-Stadion	Braunschweig	0–1	Hannover	18,000	+1
37	1968–69	16 November 1968	Bundesliga	Niedersachsenstadion	Hannover	1–1	Braunschweig	21,000	+1
38	1968–69	23 May 1969	Bundesliga	Eintracht-Stadion	Braunschweig	3–3	Hannover	13,000	+1
39	1969–70	23 August 1969	Bundesliga	Eintracht-Stadion	Braunschweig	1–1	Hannover	30,000	+1
40	1969–70	3 March 1970	Bundesliga	Niedersachsenstadion	Hannover	0–2	Braunschweig	22,000	+2
41	1970–71	31 October 1970	Bundesliga	Niedersachsenstadion	Hannover	1–0	Braunschweig	22,000	+1
42	1970–71	8 May 1971	Bundesliga	Eintracht-Stadion	Braunschweig	0–4	Hannover	17,000	0
43	1971–72	1 September 1971	Bundesliga	Eintracht-Stadion	Braunschweig	3–0	Hannover	26,000	+1
44	1971–72	19 February 1972	Bundesliga	Niedersachsenstadion	Hannover	3–0	Braunschweig	18,000	0
45	1972–73	25 November 1972	Bundesliga	Niedersachsenstadion	Hannover	2–1	Braunschweig	15,500	+1
46	1972–73	26 May 1973	Bundesliga	Eintracht-Stadion	Braunschweig	3–2	Hannover	30,000	0
47	1975–76	25 October 1975	Bundesliga	Eintracht-Stadion	Braunschweig	3–2	Hannover	34,000	+1
48	1975–76	17 April 1976	Bundesliga	Niedersachsenstadion	Hannover	2–0	Braunschweig	36,000	0
49	1980–81	26 September 1980	2. Bundesliga Nord	Niedersachsenstadion	Hannover	1–1	Braunschweig	35,000	0
50	1980–81	21 April 1981	2. Bundesliga Nord	Eintracht-Stadion	Braunschweig	2–0	Hannover	20,000	+1
51	1986–87	12 September 1986	2. Bundesliga	Niedersachsenstadion	Hannover	1–0	Braunschweig	52,000	+1
52	1986–87	4 April 1987	2. Bundesliga	Eintracht-Stadion	Braunschweig	0–0	Hannover	26,237	+1
53	1989–90	29 July 1989	2. Bundesliga	Eintracht-Stadion	Braunschweig	1–0	Hannover	25,000	0
54	1989–90	25 November 1989	2. Bundesliga	Niedersachsenstadion	Hannover	3–0	Braunschweig	25,000	+1
55	1990–91	5 September 1990	2. Bundesliga	Eintracht-Stadion	Braunschweig	0–1	Hannover	13,300	+2
56	1990–91	28 March 1991	2. Bundesliga	Niedersachsenstadion	Hannover	3–0	Braunschweig	11,500	+2
57	1991–92	21 September 1991	2. Bundesliga Nord	Eintracht-Stadion	Braunschweig	1–3	Hannover	9,000	+3
58	1991–92	8 December 1991	2. Bundesliga Nord	Niedersachsenstadion	Hannover	1–1	Braunschweig	10,400	+3
59	1992–93	1 August 1992	2. Bundesliga	Eintracht-Stadion	Braunschweig	3–2	Hannover	12,000	+2
60	1992–93	28 February 1993	2. Bundesliga	Niedersachsenstadion	Hannover	0–1	Braunschweig	7,600	+1
61	1996–97	30 August 1996	Regionalliga Nord	Eintracht-Stadion	Braunschweig	3–2	Hannover		0
62	1996–97	12 February 1997	Regionalliga Nord	Niedersachsenstadion	Hannover	4–0	Braunschweig	–	+1
63	1997–98	9 November 1997	Regionalliga Nord	Niedersachsenstadion	Hannover	1–1	Braunschweig	–	+1
64	1997–98	7 May 1998	Regionalliga Nord	Eintracht-Stadion	Braunschweig	0–1	Hannover		+2
65	2013–14	8 November 2013	Bundesliga	HDI-Arena	Hannover	0–0	Braunschweig	47,200	+3
66	2013–14	6 April 2014	Bundesliga	Eintracht-Stadion	Braunschweig	3–0	Hannover	22,867	+2
67	2016–17	6 November 2016	2. Bundesliga	Eintracht-Stadion	Braunschweig	2–2	Hannover	23,000	+2
68	2016–17	15 April 2017	2. Bundesliga	HDI-Arena	Hannover	1–0	Braunschweig	42,700	+3
69	2020–21	3 October 2020	2. Bundesliga	HDI-Arena	Hannover	4–1	Braunschweig	7,300	+4
70	2020–21	6 February 2021	2. Bundesliga	Eintracht-Stadion	Braunschweig	1–2	Hannover	0 (Note: Played behind closed doors.)	+5
71	2022–23	10 September 2022	2. Bundesliga	Heinz von Heiden Arena	Hannover	1–1	Braunschweig	42,000	+5
72	2022–23	19 March 2023	2. Bundesliga	Eintracht-Stadion	Braunschweig	1–0	Hannover	20,995	+4
73	2023–24	5 November 2023	2. Bundesliga	Heinz von Heiden Arena	Hannover	2–0	Braunschweig	42,000	+5
74	2023–24	14 April 2024	2. Bundesliga	Eintracht-Stadion	Braunschweig	0–0	Hannover	21,660	+5
75	2024–25	6 October 2024	2. Bundesliga	Eintracht-Stadion	Braunschweig	2–0	Hannover	19,919	+4
76	2024–25	9 March 2025	2. Bundesliga	Heinz von Heiden Arena	Hannover	1–1	Braunschweig	32,100	+4
77	2025–26	26 October 2025	2. Bundesliga	Eintracht-Stadion	Braunschweig	0–3	Hannover	22,098	+5
78	2025–26	21 March 2026	2. Bundesliga	Heinz von Heiden Arena	Hannover	1–0	Braunschweig	42,000	+6
79	2026–27	25 October 2026	2. Bundesliga	Eintracht-Stadion	Braunschweig	2–0	Hannover	22,175	+5

Cup

#	Season	Date	Competition	Stadium	Home Team	Result	Away Team	Attendance	Round
1	1905	9 April 1905	Fußballmeisterschaft	Victoria 96-Platz, Magdeburg	FC Braunschweig	3–2	Hannoverscher FC		2nd round Q
2	1941	13 July 1941	DFB-Pokal	Eintracht-Stadion	Braunschweig	1–3	Hannover	2,000	1st round
3	1972–73	5 July 1972	DFL-Ligapokal	Eintracht-Stadion	Braunschweig	1–0	Hannover		Group stage
4	1972–73	26 July 1972	DFL-Ligapokal	Niedersachsenstadion	Hannover	2–3	Braunschweig		Group stage
5	2003–04	29 October 2003	DFB-Pokal	Eintracht-Stadion	Braunschweig	2–0	Hannover	23,000	2nd round

== Statistics ==
=== All-time top goalscorers ===
As of 14 April 2024

Rank	Nation	Player	Club(s)	Years	Oberliga Nord	Bundesliga	Overall
1	(Germany)	Hannes Tkotz	Hannover 96	1949–1959	10	0	10
2	(Germany)	Heinz Wewetzer	Hannover 96	1950–1960	7	0	7
3	(Germany)	Hans Siemensmeyer	Hannover 96	1965–1974	0	6	6
3	(Germany)	Winfried Herz	Eintracht Braunschweig	1951–1961	6	0	6
5	(Germany)	Georg Kellermann	Hannover 96	1955–1965	5	0	5
5	(Germany)	Werner Thamm	Eintracht Braunschweig	1950–1962	5	0	5
7	(Germany)	Bernd Gersdorff	Eintracht Braunschweig	1969–1973, 1973–1976	0	4	4
7	(Germany)	Karl-Heinz Hellwig	Eintracht Braunschweig	1954–1959	4	0	4
7	(Germany)	Lothar Ulsaß	Eintracht Braunschweig	1964–1972	0	4	4

=== All-time most appearances ===
As of 14 April 2024

Rank	Nation	Player	Club(s)	Years	Oberliga Nord	Bundesliga	Overall
1	(Germany)	Jürgen Bandura	Hannover 96	1964–1974	0	18	18
2	(Germany)	Joachim Bäse	Eintracht Braunschweig	1959–1973	5	12	17
2	(Germany)	Klaus Gerwien	Eintracht Braunschweig	1961–1973	3	14	17
2	(Germany)	Peter Kaack	Eintracht Braunschweig	1963–1973	0	17	17
5	(Germany)	Hans Jäcker	Eintracht Braunschweig	1956–1967	13	3	16
5	(Germany)	Heinz Wewetzer	Hannover 96	1950–1960	16	0	16
7	(Germany)	Hans Krämer	Hannover 96	1947–1948, 1949–1959	15	0	15
7	(Germany)	Hans Siemensmeyer	Hannover 96	1965–1974	0	15	15
7	(Germany)	Jürgen Moll	Eintracht Braunschweig	1957–1968	7	8	15
7	(Germany)	Rainer Stiller	Hannover 96	1950–1960	16	0	15
7	(Germany)	Walter Schmidt	Eintracht Braunschweig	1959–1970	6	9	15
7	(Germany)	Werner Thamm	Eintracht Braunschweig	1950–1962	15	0	15

=== Honours ===
Braunschweig	Competition	Hannover
National
1	Bundesliga	—
—	2. Bundesliga	3
1	3. Liga	—
—	DFB-Pokal	1
—	Regionalliga Nord (III)	2
—	Fußballmeisterschaft (defunct)	2
1	Regionalliga Nord (II) (defunct)	—
—	Oberliga Nord (defunct)	1
3	Aggregate	9
Regional
2	Lower Saxony Cup	3
2	Aggregate	3
5	Total aggregate	12

== Literature ==
- Werner Balhauff: Hannover 96 – von Tradition und Herzblut für den Fußball. Fakten, Mythen Wissen und Meilensteine. E-Book at Neobooks, 2015.
- Volker Bergmeister, Erich Scheck: Was für ein Tag!: 366 Kalendergeschichten rund um den Fußball. Norderstedt 2016, S. 351.
