= Bundesliga scandal =

The Fußball-Bundesliga is Germany's top-flight football competition. In the course of its history it has from time to time been touched by scandal.

- The Bundesliga scandal (1965) resulted in the demotion of Hertha BSC for illegal player payments.
- The Bundesliga scandal (1971) resulted in the demotion of Arminia Bielefeld and the fining and suspension of over 50 players, as well as coaches and officials, for match fixing.
- The Bundesliga scandal (2005) involved match fixing by referees in the 2. Bundesliga, Regionalliga, and in German Cup matches that included Bundesliga sides.
