= Bandura (surname) =

Bandura is a Ukrainian surname. Notable people with the name include:

- Albert Bandura (1925–2021), Canadian-American psychologist
- Eddy Bandura (1940–2018), German football player
- Jeff Bandura (born 1957), Canadian ice hockey player
- Oleksandr Bandura (born 1986), Ukrainian football player
- Oleksandra Bandura (1917–2010), Ukrainian teacher and literature scholar

== See also ==
- Bandur (disambiguation)
