= Hans Arnold (footballer) =

German footballer

Personal information
- Date of birth: 8 October 1941
- Date of death: 8 May 1991 (aged 49)
- Height: 1.75 m (5 ft 9 in)
- Positions: Midfielder; defender

Senior career*
Years	Team	Apps	(Gls)
1960–1963	VfR Mannheim		
1963–1971	VfB Stuttgart	204	(9)
1972–1973	VfR Aalen		
1973–1974	SpVgg Ludwigsburg		

International career
1961	West Germany U-23	2	(0)
- * Club domestic league appearances and goals

Hans Arnold (8 October 1941 – 8 May 1991) was a German football player. He spent eight seasons in the Bundesliga with VfB Stuttgart. The best result he achieved was fifth place. He was involved in the Bundesliga scandal in 1971.
