= Horst-Gregorio Canellas =

German football official (1921–1999)

- Born: 6 June 1921; Plauen, Saxony, Germany
- Died: 23 July 1999 (aged 78); Offenbach am Main, Hesse, Germany
- Occupation: Fruit importer
- Known for: Chairman of Kickers Offenbach, Involvement in the 1971 Bundesliga scandal

Horst-Gregorio Canellas (6 June 1921 – 23 July 1999) was a Spanish-German entrepreneur and football official. Canellas is best known for his role in breaking the 1971 Bundesliga scandal. He was also a hostage on the hijacked German Lufthansa Flight 181 in 1977.

== Biography ==
Canellas, son of a Spanish father and a German mother, was born in Plauen, Saxony, in 1921. After the end of World War II he spent some time in Spain and then moved to Hesse and adopted German citizenship. He became the managing director of a fruit importer in Frankfurt.

In 1964 Canellas became chairman of Kickers Offenbach, a club then playing in the second division Regionalliga Süd. Offenbach won promotion to the Bundesliga in 1968 and 1970 but suffered immediate relegation on both occasions.

The day after the end of the 1970–71 Bundesliga season Canellas invited officials of the German Football Association and the press to his 50th birthday celebration. It was there that he broke the 1971 Bundesliga scandal by replaying voice recordings he had made of attempts to manipulate Bundesliga games through bribes. Earlier attempts to inform the German Association had been ignored by the latter. Canellas stepped down immediately as chairman of Kickers Offenbach and was initially banned for life from holding any office at a German football club but this ban was lifted in 1976. The following scandal took 18-months to clear up and saw 52 players and two managers banned and fined.

Canellas retired from his business in 1974.

On a flight from Mallorca to Frankfurt in 1977 the plane he was on, Lufthansa Flight 181 Landshut, was hijacked by members of the PFLP in order to force the release of imprisoned German guerilla Red Army Faction leaders. The hostages were later freed by the German counter-terrorism unit GSG 9 in Mogadishu.

Canellas died of lung cancer after a long illness in Offenbach in 1999.
