= Manfred Manglitz =

German footballer (1940–2026)

Personal information
- Date of birth: 8 March 1940
- Place of birth: Cologne, Germany
- Date of death: 13 July 2026 (aged 86)
- Height: 1.90 m (6 ft 3 in)
- Position: Goalkeeper

Youth career
- SC West Köln 1900/11

Senior career*
Years	Team	Apps	(Gls)
1961–1963	Bayer Leverkusen		
1963–1969	Meidericher SV / MSV Duisburg	192	(1)
1969–1971	1. FC Köln	65	(0)

International career
1965–1970	West Germany	4	(0)
Medal record
Men's football
Representing West Germany
FIFA World Cup
Third place	1970 Mexico
- * Club domestic league appearances and goals

Manfred Manglitz (8 March 1940 – 13 July 2026) was a German footballer who played as a goalkeeper.

== Club career ==
In 257 West German top-flight matches for MSV Duisburg and FC Cologne he scored one goal.. This was the first time in Bundesliga history that a goalkeeper converted a penalty.

== International career ==
Manglitz was a non-playing member of the West German squad at 1970 FIFA World Cup. In total he won four caps playing four times for his country from 1965 to 1970.

== Death ==
Manglitz died on 13 July 2026, at the age of 86.

== Trivia ==
Outspoken Manglitz was one of a handful of West Germany international footballers (including Klaus Fichtel, Bernd Patzke etc.) involved in the match fixing Bundesligaskandal in 1971, in consequence receiving a lifetime ban from the ordinary courts of the German Football Association.
