= Hans Hägele =

German footballer

Personal information
- Date of birth: 13 July 1940
- Date of death: 18 October 2010 (aged 70)
- Place of death: Körsch Viaduct, Germany
- Height: 1.76 m (5 ft 9 1/2 in)
- Position: Striker

Senior career*
Years	Team	Apps	(Gls)
19xx–1968	VfL Sindelfingen	?	(?)
1968–1970	VfR Heilbronn	?	(?)
1970–1971	Fortuna Düsseldorf	2	(?)
Total		?	(?)
- * Club domestic league appearances and goals

Hans Hägele (13 July 1940 – 18 October 2010) was a German professional footballer who played as a striker. He later became a football agent.

== Career ==
Hägele played for VfL Sindelfingen, VfR Heilbronn and Fortuna Düsseldorf.

Hägele later became a football agent, and helped engineer Armin Veh's move from Borussia Mönchengladbach to St. Gallen in 1983.

He was also a witness at Christoph Daum's trial for cocaine abuse.

== Death ==
Hägele jumped from the Körsch Viaduct on 18 October 2010, at the age of 70. He left no suicide note.
