= Hans Kindermann =

German jurist

Hans Kindermann (10 February 1922 in Teplice – 3 November 2018) was a German jurist.

Kindermann was a member of the Control Committee of the German Football Association (German: DFB-Kontrollausschuss) since 1963 and became its chairman in 1970. In this position, he investigated the Bundesliga scandal in 1971. The media referred to Kindermann as the "DFB chief prosecutor". He clarified the scandal, in which the parties involved were partially pronounced draconian punishments.

In civil life, Kindermann was a judge, where he last worked at the district court of Stuttgart.

In 1992, he received the Order of Merit of the Federal Republic of Germany, First Class. In October 1992 he left the Control Committee of the German Football Association. Kindermann is an honorary member of the German Football Association.

He died on 3 November 2018, aged 96.
