= 1973–74 in West German football =

Football in Germany
- Season: 1973–74

Men's football
- Bundesliga: Bayern Munich
- DFB-Pokal: Eintracht Frankfurt

Women's football
- Champions: TuS Wörrstadt

The 1973–74 season is the 64th season of competitive football in Germany.

== Promotion and relegation ==
=== Pre Season ===
| League | Promoted to League | Relegated from League |
|---|---|---|
| Bundesliga | Fortuna Köln; Rot-Weiss Essen | Eintracht Braunschweig; Rot-Weiß Oberhausen |

=== Post Season ===
| League | Promoted to League | Relegated from League |
|---|---|---|
| Bundesliga | Tennis Borussia Berlin; Eintracht Braunschweig | Fortuna Köln; Hannover 96 |

== National teams ==
=== Germany national football team ===
==== 1974 FIFA World Cup ====
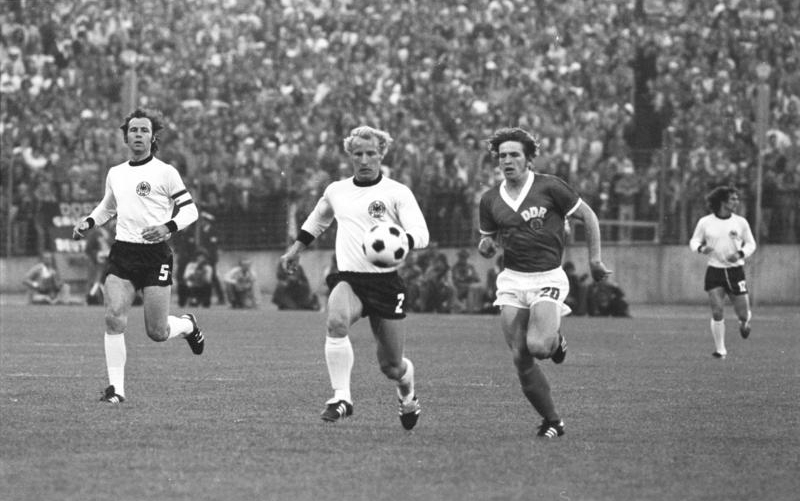
West Germany (in white) against East Germany in the 1974 World Cup

| 14 June 1974 First round | West Germany | 1–0 | Chile | West Berlin |
| 16:00 CET | Breitner 18' | FIFA | | Stadium: Olympiastadion; Attendance: 81,100; Referee: Doğan Babacan (Turkey) |

| 18 June 1974 First round | Australia | 0–3 | West Germany | Hamburg |
| 16:00 CET | | FIFA | Overath 12'; Cullmann 34'; Müller 53' | Stadium: Volksparkstadion; Attendance: 53,300; Referee: Mostafa Kamil (Egypt) |

| 22 June 1974 First round | East Germany | 1–0 | West Germany | Hamburg |
| 19:30 CET | Sparwasser 77' | Report | | Stadium: Volksparkstadion; Attendance: 60,200; Referee: Ramón Barreto (Uruguay) |

| 26 June 1974 Second round | Yugoslavia | 0–2 | West Germany | Düsseldorf |
| 16:00 CET | | Report | Breitner 39'; Müller 82' | Stadium: Rheinstadion; Attendance: 67,385; Referee: Armando Marques (Brazil) |

| 30 June 1974 Second round | West Germany | 4–2 | Sweden | Düsseldorf |
| 19:30 CET | Overath 51'; Bonhof 52'; Grabowski 76'; Hoeneß 89' (pen.) | Report | Edström 24'; Sandberg 53' | Stadium: Rheinstadion; Attendance: 67,800; Referee: Pavel Kazakov (Soviet Union) |

| 3 July 1974 Second round | Poland | 0–1 | West Germany | Frankfurt |
| 16:30 CET | | Report | Müller 76' | Stadium: Waldstadion; Attendance: 62,000; Referee: Erich Linemayr (Austria) |

| 7 July 1974 Final | Netherlands | 1–2 | West Germany | Munich |
| 16:00 (CET) | Neeskens 2' (pen.) | Report | Breitner 25' (pen.); Müller 43' | Stadium: Olympiastadion; Attendance: 78,200; Referee: Jack Taylor (England) |

==== Friendly matches ====
| 16 June 1973 | West Germany | 0–1 | Brazil | West Berlin |
| | | DFB; Report | Dirceu 73' | Stadium: Olympiastadion; Attendance: 75,000; Referee: Arie van Gemert (Netherlands) |

| 5 September 1973 | Soviet Union | 0–1 | West Germany | Moscow, Soviet Union |
| | | DFB; Report | Müller 62' | Stadium: Central Lenin Stadium; Attendance: 61,647; Referee: Nikola Mladenović (Yugoslavia) |

| 10 October 1973 | West Germany | 4–0 | Austria | Hanover, West Germany |
| | Müller 29', 50'; Weber 45'; Kremers 79' | DFB; Report | | Stadium: Niedersachsenstadion; Attendance: 55,000; Referee: Alfred Delcourt (Belgium) |

| 13 October 1973 | West Germany | 2–1 | France | Gelsenkirchen, West Germany |
| | Müller 55', 59' (pen.) | DFB; Report | Trésor 82' | Stadium: Parkstadion; Attendance: 70,400; Referee: Rudolf Scheurer (Switzerland) |

| 14 November 1973 | Scotland | 1–1 | West Germany | Glasgow, Scotland |
| | Holton 5' | DFB; Report | Hoeneß 81' | Stadium: Hampden Park; Attendance: 58,235; Referee: Jack Taylor (England) |

| 24 November 1973 | West Germany | 2–1 | Spain | Stuttgart, West Germany |
| | Heynckes 13', 37' | DFB; Report | Claramunt 53' | Stadium: Neckarstadion; Attendance: 70,000; Referee: Alistair MacKenzie (Scotland) |

| 23 February 1974 | Spain | 1–0 | West Germany | Barcelona, Spain |
| | Asensi 20' | DFB; Report | | Stadium: Estadi de Sarrià; Attendance: 17,000; Referee: Michal Jursa (Czechoslovakia) |

| 26 February 1974 | Italy | 0–0 | West Germany | Rome, Italy |
| | | DFB; Report | | Stadium: Stadio Olimpico; Attendance: 90,000; Referee: Anton Bucheli (Switzerland) |

| 27 March 1974 | West Germany | 2–1 | Scotland | Frankfurt, West Germany |
| | Breitner 33' (pen.); Grabowski 35' | DFB; Report | Dalglish 77' | Stadium: Waldstadion; Attendance: 60,000; Referee: Paul Schiller (Austria) |

| 17 April 1974 | West Germany | 5–0 | Hungary | Dortmund, West Germany |
| | Wimmer 11'; Hölzenbein 54'; Kremers 67'; Müller 74', 87' | DFB; Report | | Stadium: Westfalenstadion; Attendance: 56,000; Referee: Robert Schaut (Belgium) |

| 1 May 1974 | West Germany | 2–0 | Sweden | Hamburg, West Germany |
| | Heynckes 51', 58' | DFB; Report | | Stadium: Volksparkstadion; Attendance: 55,000; Referee: Michel Kitabdjian (France) |

== League season ==
=== Bundesliga ===
| Pos | Team | Pld | W | D | L | GF | GA | GD | Pts | Qualification or relegation |
|---|---|---|---|---|---|---|---|---|---|---|
| 1 | Bayern Munich (C) | 34 | 20 | 9 | 5 | 95 | 53 | +42 | 49 | Qualification to European Cup first round |
| 2 | Borussia Mönchengladbach | 34 | 21 | 6 | 7 | 93 | 52 | +41 | 48 | Qualification to UEFA Cup first round |
| 3 | Fortuna Düsseldorf | 34 | 16 | 9 | 9 | 61 | 47 | +14 | 41 | Qualification to UEFA Cup first round |
| 4 | Eintracht Frankfurt | 34 | 15 | 11 | 8 | 63 | 50 | +13 | 41 | Qualification to Cup Winners' Cup first round |
| 5 | 1. FC Köln | 34 | 16 | 7 | 11 | 69 | 56 | +13 | 39 | Qualification to UEFA Cup first round |
| 6 | 1. FC Kaiserslautern | 34 | 15 | 8 | 11 | 80 | 69 | +11 | 38 | |
| 7 | Schalke 04 | 34 | 16 | 5 | 13 | 72 | 68 | +4 | 37 | |
| 8 | Hertha BSC | 34 | 11 | 11 | 12 | 56 | 60 | −4 | 33 | |
| 9 | VfB Stuttgart | 34 | 12 | 7 | 15 | 58 | 57 | +1 | 31 | |
| 10 | Kickers Offenbach | 34 | 11 | 9 | 14 | 56 | 62 | −6 | 31 | |
| 11 | Werder Bremen | 34 | 9 | 13 | 12 | 48 | 56 | −8 | 31 | |
| 12 | Hamburger SV | 34 | 13 | 5 | 16 | 53 | 62 | −9 | 31 | Qualification to UEFA Cup first round (Note: As Eintracht Frankfurt qualified for the Cup Winners' Cup, their UEFA Cup spot was transferred to DFB-Pokal runners-up Hamburger SV.) |
| 13 | Rot-Weiss Essen | 34 | 10 | 11 | 13 | 56 | 70 | −14 | 31 | |
| 14 | VfL Bochum | 34 | 9 | 12 | 13 | 45 | 57 | −12 | 30 | |
| 15 | MSV Duisburg | 34 | 11 | 7 | 16 | 42 | 56 | −14 | 29 | |
| 16 | Wuppertaler SV | 34 | 8 | 9 | 17 | 42 | 65 | −23 | 25 | |
| 17 | Fortuna Köln (R) | 34 | 8 | 9 | 17 | 46 | 79 | −33 | 25 | Relegation to 2. Bundesliga |
| 18 | Hannover 96 (R) | 34 | 6 | 10 | 18 | 50 | 66 | −16 | 22 | Relegation to 2. Bundesliga |

Source: www.dfb.de
Rules for classification: 1) points; 2) goal difference; 3) number of goals scored.
(C) Champions; (R) Relegated

== DFB–Pokal ==
Eintracht Frankfurt won the 1973–74 DFB-Pokal final by defeating Hamburger SV 3–1 on 17 August 1974.

== German clubs in Europe ==
=== European Cup ===
==== Bayern Munich ====
Bayern Munich won the 1973–74 European Cup defeating Atlético Madrid 4–0 in a replay of the 1974 European Cup Final. The replay was needed because the first match between the two clubs ended as a 1–1 draw.

=== European Cup Winners' Cup ===
==== Borussia Mönchengladbach ====
Borussia Mönchengladbach were eliminated in the semi-finals of the European Cup Winners' Cup by A.C. Milan.

=== UEFA Cup ===
==== Fortuna Düsseldorf ====
Fortuna Düsseldorf were eliminated in the third round of the UEFA Cup by Lokomotive Leipzig.

==== 1. FC Köln ====
1. FC Köln were eliminated in the quarter-finals of the UEFA Cup by Tottenham Hotspur F.C.

==== VfB Stuttgart ====
VfB Stuttgart were eliminated in the semi-finals of the UEFA Cup by eventual champions Feyenoord.

==== Wuppertaler SV ====
Wuppertaler SV were eliminated in the first round of the UEFA Cup by Ruch Chorzów.
