= Bandur =

Bandur may refer to:

== People ==
- Jovan Bandur, Serbian classic composer and orchestra conductor
- Maggie Bandur, American screenwriter
- Miloš Banđur, Serbian politician

== Places ==
- Bandur, a town in Limpopo Province, South Africa
- Bandur (Karnataka), a settlement in Karnataka, India

== See also ==
- Bandura
