= Miloš Banđur =

Serbian politician

Miloš Banđur (Serbian Cyrillic: Милош Банђур; born 16 September 1966) is a politician in Serbia. He was the deputy mayor of Niš from 2016 to 2020 and has been a member of the National Assembly of Serbia since 2020. Banđur is a member of the Serbian Progressive Party.

== Early life and private career ==
Banđur was born in Priština, Autonomous Province of Kosovo and Metohija, in what was then the Socialist Republic of Serbia in the Socialist Federal Republic of Yugoslavia. He graduated from the University of Priština's Faculty of Economics in 1993 and began working at the university the following year. He became a professor at the Faculty of Technical Sciences in northern Kosovska Mitrovica in 2009 and also began working at Alpha University in Belgrade in 2011. His biography indicates that he holds a master's degree (2001) and a Ph.D. (2008) from the Faculty of Electronics in Belgrade.

== Politician ==
=== Municipal politics ===
Banđur joined the Progressive Party upon its foundation in 2008. He received the seventh position on the party's electoral list for the Niš city assembly in the 2012 Serbian local elections and was elected when the list won seventeen out of sixty-one mandates. The Progressives formed a local coalition government with the Socialist Party of Serbia and the United Regions of Serbia after the election, and Banđur was appointed to the city council (i.e., the executive branch of the municipal government) with responsibility for communal issues and energy.

He was given the eleventh position on the party's list in the 2016 local elections and was re-elected when the list won twenty-eight seats. The party remained the dominant force in Niš's municipal government, and Banđur was appointed as deputy mayor. He remained in this position for the next four years.

Banđur was sometimes critical of decisions taken by his own government, and his relationship with the local Progressive Party organization has sometimes been contentious. In 2014, he lost supervisory authority over two public companies after publicly asking their chairs to resign. He received a vote of non-confidence from the Progressive Party's city board in February 2015, although he was ultimately allowed to keep his position in the party. He was given an official warning for violating party discipline in October 2017.

Banđur was again given the seventh position on the Progressive Party's list in the 2020 Serbian local elections and was elected to a third term when the list won a majority victory with forty-seven seats.

=== Parliamentarian ===
Banđur received the 178th position on the Progressive Party's Aleksandar Vučić — For Our Children list in the 2020 Serbian parliamentary election and was elected when the list won a landslide majority with 188 mandates. He is a member of the assembly committee on education, science, technological development, and the information society; a deputy member of the committee on the economy, regional development, trade, tourism, and energy; a deputy member of the committee on spatial planning, transport, infrastructure, and telecommunications; and a member of the parliamentary friendship groups with Belarus, Cyprus, Kazakhstan, Norway, and Russia.

In November 2020, he criticized the appointment of fellow Progressive Party member Dragan Šormaz as the head of Serbia's delegation to the North Atlantic Treaty Organization Parliamentary Assembly, due to comments made by Šormaz that were critical of Russia. He also criticized the appointment of members with poor assembly attendance records to international delegations. Ivica Dačić, the president of the assembly, responded by (jokingly) referring to Banđur as an opposition member.
