= Körsch Viaduct =

Road bridge in Germany

Koersch Viaduct
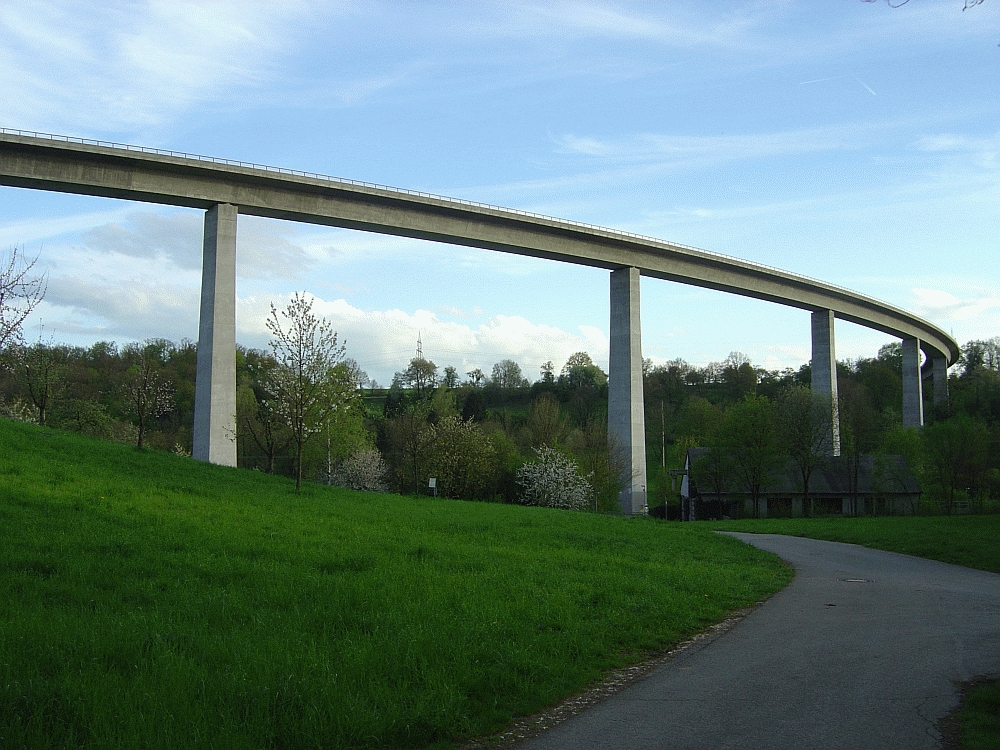
- Koersch Bridge
- Coordinates: 48°42′07″N 9°17′20″E
- Carries: 2 lanes
- Locale: Baden-Württemberg, Germany
- Official name: Körschtalviadukt

Characteristics
- Total length: 724 m
- Height: 55 m

History
- Opened: 6 September 1995

Location
- Interactive map of Koersch Viaduct

The Körsch Viaduct is a bridge that crosses the Körsch Valley (river Körsch) in Germany, supporting a road around Nellingen. It was built from 1991 to 1993 by incremental launch. It was handed over to the public on 6 September 1995. The bridge also crosses a 110 kilovolt power line of the EnBW AG and a sewage treatment plant.
