= Manfred Dubski =

German association football player

Personal information
- Date of birth: 19 September 1954 (age 71)
- Place of birth: Bottrop, West Germany
- Height: 1.68 m (5 ft 6 in)
- Position: Midfielder

Senior career*
Years	Team	Apps	(Gls)
1972–1979	Schalke 04	73	(2)
1979–1986	MSV Duisburg	251	(32)
1986–1988	Rot-Weiß Oberhausen	56	(0)
1988–1989	Union Solingen	20	(0)
- * Club domestic league appearances and goals

Manfred Dubski (born 19 September 1954) is a retired German footballer. He made 190 appearances in the Bundesliga for Schalke 04 and MSV Duisburg as well as 210 matches in the 2. Bundesliga for Duisburg, Rot-Weiß Oberhausen and Union Solingen.
