= Klaus Ackermann =

German footballer

Personal information
- Date of birth: 20 March 1946 (age 80)
- Place of birth: Hamm, Germany
- Height: 1.67 m (5 ft 6 in)
- Positions: Forward; midfielder

Youth career
- TuS Germania Hamm

Senior career*
Years	Team	Apps	(Gls)
1964–1967	Preußen Münster		
1967–1969	Borussia Mönchengladbach	60	(11)
1969–1974	1. FC Kaiserslautern	157	(20)
1974–1979	Borussia Dortmund	101	(9)
1979–1980	SC Herford	17	(0)
- * Club domestic league appearances and goals

Klaus Ackermann (born 20 March 1946) is a German former professional footballer who played as a forward or midfielder. He spent ten seasons in the Bundesliga with Borussia Mönchengladbach, 1. FC Kaiserslautern and Borussia Dortmund.

== Honours ==
- DFB-Pokal finalist: 1971–72
