= Mladen Wacha =

Personal information
- Full name: Mladen Wacha
- Date of birth: 15 January 1942 (age 84)
- Place of birth: Metlika, Kingdom of Italy
- Position: Midfielder

Youth career
- NK Zagreb

Senior career*
Years	Team	Apps	(Gls)
1958–1969	NK Zagreb		
1970–1971	RFK Bor		

International career
1959	Yugoslavia U18	1	(1)
1965	Yugoslavia B	1	(2)

Managerial career
- 1972–199x: NK Zagreb (youth)
- * Club domestic league appearances and goals

Mladen Wacha (alternatively Vaha; born 15 January 1942) is a Yugoslav former football player and coach.

== Career ==
Born in Metlika in 1942, right in middle of Second World War when the town was part of the Province of Ljubljana which was annexed by Fascist Italy, he started playing in the youth team of NK Zagreb. He debuted for the first team in 1958 and played until 1969. For NK Zagreb he made around 300 league appearances, and scored 70 goals in both Yugoslav First and Second leagues. Wacha joined FK Bor which was playing in the Yugoslav elite and was coached by Marcel Žigante. He made 17 appearances and scored one goal in the 1970–71 Yugoslav First League. Wacha left Bor in summer 1972.

He also played for the youth team of the city of Zagreb, youth team of SR Croatia, and Yugoslavia U-18 national team. His highlight was the appearance for the Yugoslav B national team in a game in Skopje, played on October 10, 1965, against France where he scored both goals in Yugoslav victory by 2–1.

He played as midfielder and was known for his good long-distance shot. From 1972 on he is the coach of the youth teams of NK Zagreb, having won with them the Croatian youth championship in 1991.
