= Heinz van Haaren =

Dutch footballer

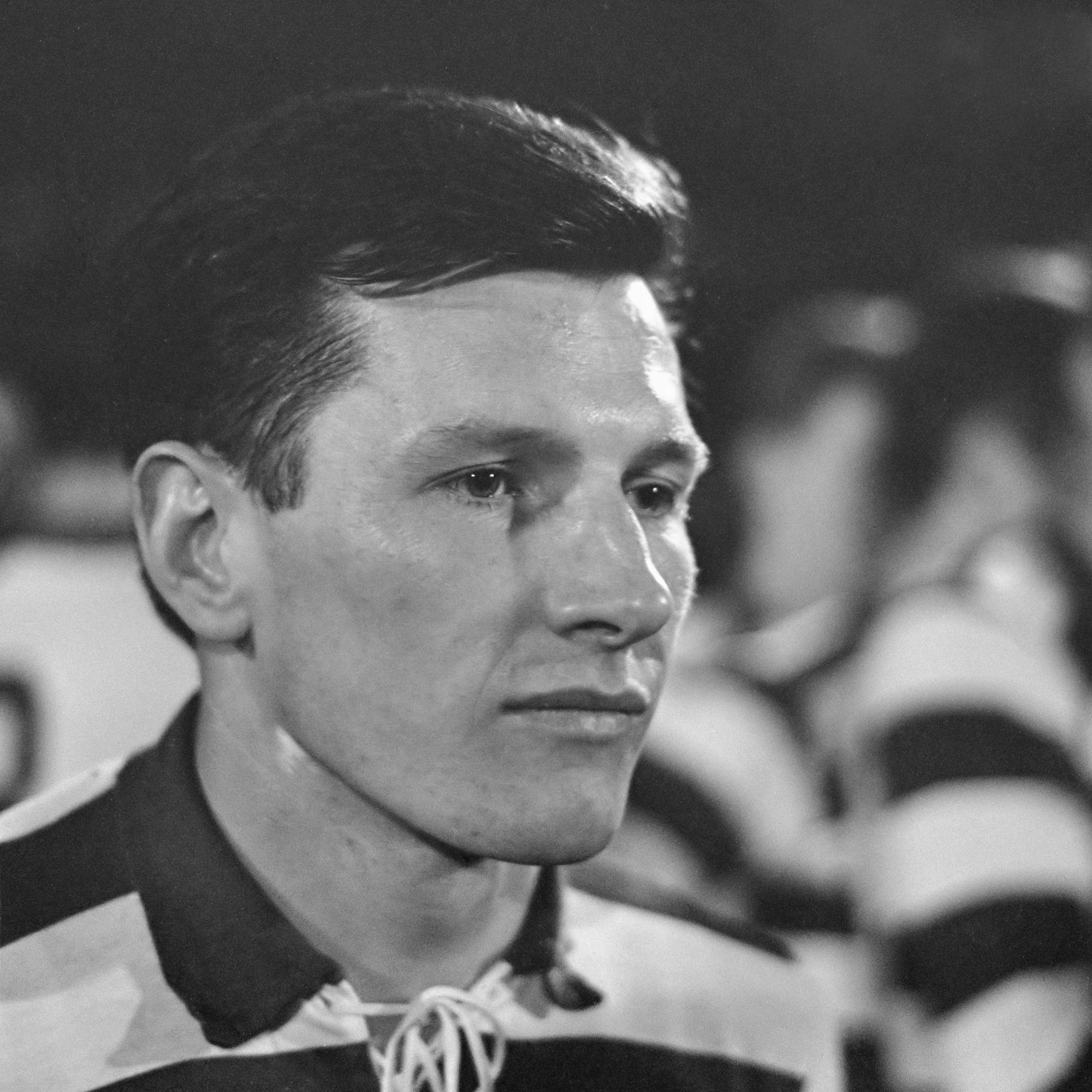
- Heinz van Haaren (1968)

Personal information
- Date of birth: 3 June 1940 (age 86)
- Place of birth: Marl, Germany
- Height: 1.76 m (5 ft 9 in)
- Position: Midfielder

Senior career*
Years	Team	Apps	(Gls)
1960–1964	TSV Marl-Hüls	119	(10)
1964–1968	MSV Duisburg	123	(22)
1968–1972	Schalke 04	126	(9)
1972–1973	Strasbourg	37	(6)
Total		404	(47)

Managerial career
- 1977–1978: FC Schalke 04 (youth team)
- * Club domestic league appearances and goals

Heinz van Haaren (born 3 June 1940 in Marl, Province of Westphalia) is a Dutch retired football midfielder.

In the early 1970s, Schalke midfielder van Haaren was linked to the Bundesliga scandal and banned for two years. He subsequently moved abroad to play for Strasbourg. Van Haaren was the Dutch player with most Bundesliga matches until Jeffrey Gouweleeuw surpassed him.
