= Gerhard Kentschke =

German footballer and manager

Personal information
- Date of birth: 18 September 1942 (age 84)
- Height: 1.75 m (5 ft 9 in)
- Positions: Striker; midfielder

Senior career*
Years	Team	Apps	(Gls)
1963–1966	Karlsruher SC	50	(10)
1966–1970	1. FC Kaiserslautern	120	(24)
1970–1972	MSV Duisburg	52	(5)
1973–1977	Bayer 04 Leverkusen	48	(5)

Managerial career
- 1981–1982: Bayer 04 Leverkusen
- * Club domestic league appearances and goals

Gerhard 'Gerd' Kentschke (born 18 September 1942) is a retired German football player and coach. As a player, he spent nine seasons in the Bundesliga with Karlsruher SC, 1. FC Kaiserslautern and MSV Duisburg. The best league finish he achieved during those years was fifth place. He was banned for ten years in the match-fixing Bundesliga scandal of 1971, but his ban was lifted in less than a year.
