= Bundesliga scandal (1965) =

The Bundesliga scandal of 1965 grew out of the failure of the German Football Association (Deutsche Fußball-Bund, DFB) to fully embrace paid professionalism, an aversion rooted in the broader history of sport in the country. Many clubs circumvented the strict financial limits then in place in German football, and it became common practice for teams to make payments to players or their agents in excess of the limits set by the DFB in an attempt to gain a competitive edge. In addition, some clubs paid players from competing sides to underperform in key matches.

The scandal came to light in February 1965, when the DFB's auditor found discrepancies in the accounts of the Hertha Berlin club that were quickly identified as illegal player payments. Hertha's position in the economic rough and tumble of German football was weakened by the city of Berlin's dangerous political situation as an isolated enclave in the middle of the Soviet-occupied East Germany during the Cold War. Many players did not wish to play in Berlin, and the club was forced into paying premiums beyond even what other teams were already illegally paying. Despite evidence of widespread problems, only Hertha was sanctioned, and the club was relegated from the top-flight Bundesliga to the second division, Regionalliga Berlin.

For political reasons, the DFB wished to maintain Berlin's representation within the Bundesliga. In the competition that had been held for promotion to the Bundesliga, Tennis Borussia Berlin had finished at the bottom of their group behind Bayern Munich, 1. FC Saarbrücken, and Alemannia Aachen and so could not be considered for promotion before those clubs. The DFB turned to Spandauer SV, who had finished second in the Regionalliga Berlin, with an offer of promotion that the club refused. Tasmania 1900 Berlin, the third-place finisher and the previous season's champion, was approached next and accepted promotion.

The decision prompted objections from Karlsruher SC and FC Schalke 04, who were relegated and argued that their performance warranted consideration for Hertha's vacated Bundesliga spot over Berlin-based Regionalliga sides. To mollify these clubs, the Bundesliga was expanded from 16 to 18 teams the following season, and the two sides maintained their places in first division competition.

Tasmania's single season in the Bundesliga remains notable for setting records for lowest performance metrics in league history.

In response to the economic issues, the DFB raised the limits on transfer fees and player salaries, though not to the level of other professional European leagues. These reforms preceded a second similar scandal approximately six years later.
