= Mathias Schipper =

German association football player

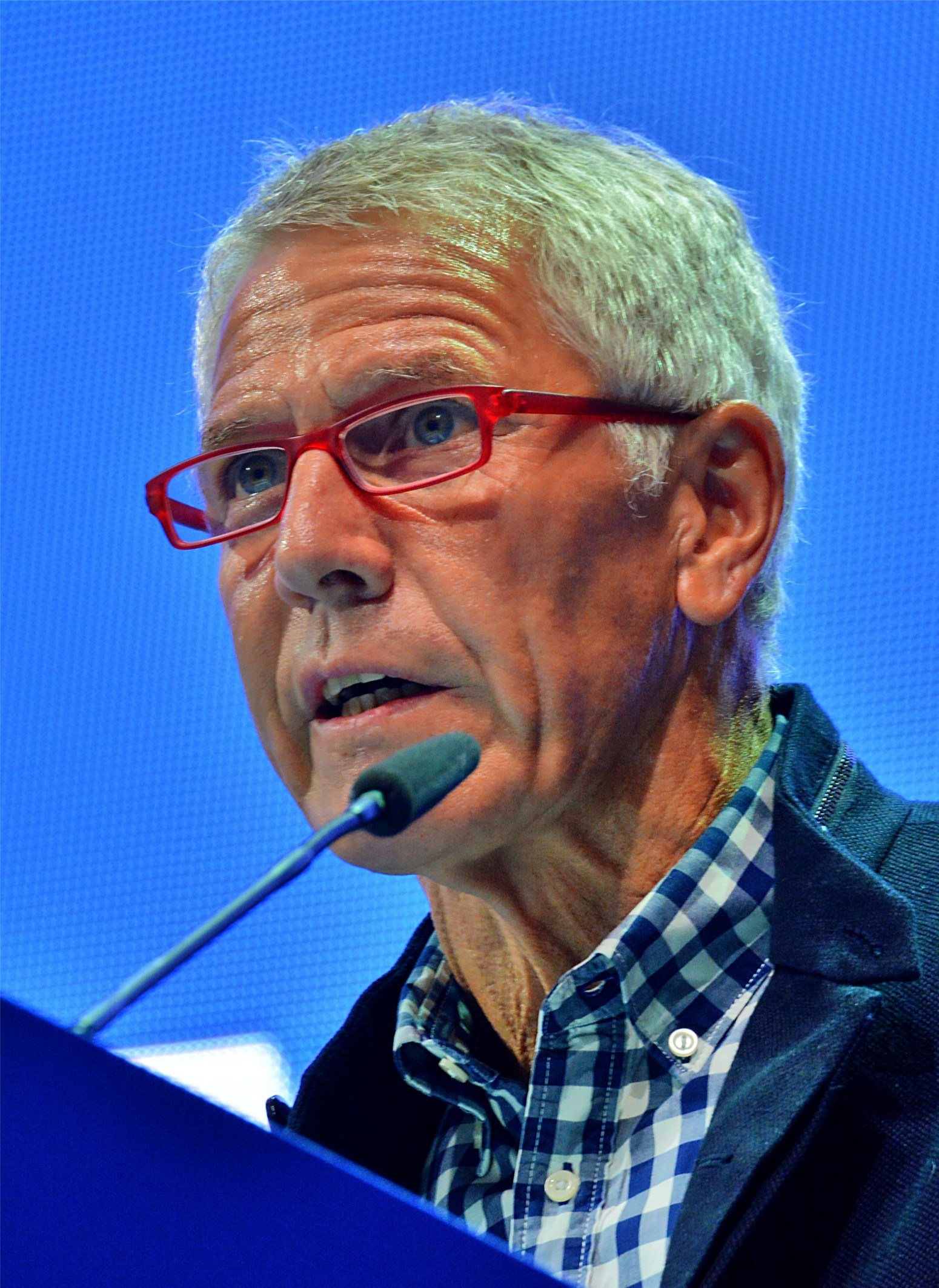
- Schipper in 2017

Personal information
- Date of birth: 23 September 1957 (age 69)
- Place of birth: Castrop-Rauxel, West Germany
- Height: 1.83 m (6 ft 0 in)
- Position: Defender

Youth career
- 1975–1976: Schalke 04

Senior career*
Years	Team	Apps	(Gls)
1976–1979	Schalke 04	50	(1)
1979–1982	Alemannia Aachen	107	(7)
1982–1988	Schalke 04	171	(6)
- * Club domestic league appearances and goals

Mathias Schipper (born 23 September 1957) is a retired German footballer, who played as a defender for Schalke 04 and Alemannia Aachen. From 1976 until 1988, he completed 189 matches in the Bundesliga (all for Schalke) and made 139 appearances in the 2. Bundesliga (Schalke 32, Alemannia 107). Since 2017, he is a member of the electoral committee of Schalke, which decides on the admission of candidates for the election of the Supervisory Board.
