= Gabriel Abossolo =

Cameroonian footballer (1939–2014)

Paul Abossolo
Personal information
- Date of birth: 16 January 1939
- Place of birth: Cameroon
- Date of death: 9 November 2014 (aged 75)
- Place of death: Yaoundé, Cameroon
- Height: 1.67 m (5 ft 6 in)
- Position: Defensive midfielder

Senior career*
Years	Team	Apps	(Gls)
1957–1958	Stade Poitevin		
1958–1969	Bordeaux	262	(13)
1970	RFC Paris-Neuilly		
1970–1971	Stade Poitevin		
- * Club domestic league appearances and goals

Gabriel Abossolo (16 January 1939 – 9 November 2014) was a Cameroonian professional footballer who played as a defensive midfielder.

== Career ==
Abossolo's career played out almost exclusively under the colours of Bordeaux where he played for 11 seasons.
