= Joan Martínez Vilaseca =

Spanish footballer (1943–2021)

Personal information
- Full name: Joan Martínez Vilaseca
- Date of birth: 4 March 1943
- Place of birth: Manresa, Spain
- Date of death: 19 September 2021 (aged 78)
- Height: 1.69 m (5 ft 7 in)
- Positions: Forward; midfielder; left back

Senior career*
Years	Team	Apps	(Gls)
1963–1972	Espanyol	152	(11)
1972–1974	Levante	33	(1)
Total		185	(12)

Managerial career
- 1983–1984: Barcelona C
- 1984–1987: Barcelona B
- * Club domestic league appearances and goals

Joan Martínez Vilaseca (4 March 1943 – 19 September 2021) was a Spanish professional footballer, and a manager. He also worked as the scout and youth team director in FC Barcelona.

== Playing career ==
Born in Manresa, Barcelona, Catalonia, Vilaseca started his professional career in Espanyol and played for a long time appearing in first and second division and, after Espanyol, he joined Levante for two seasons. In his playing career he played in different positions as a forward, central midfielder and as a left back.

== Coaching career ==
Vilaseca managed Barcelona amateur teams and managed the B team. He worked in different roles in Barcelona before his retirement, including as a scout and head of youth development. Throughout his 29 years linked to Barcelona academy, Martínez Vilaseca has signed players such as Guillermo Amor, Iván de la Peña, Luis García, Mikel Arteta, Xavi Hernández, Sergio García, Cesc Fàbregas, Bojan Krkić, Andrés Iniesta, and Carles Puyol.
