= Rolf Rüssmann =

German footballer (1950–2009)

Personal information
- Full name: Rolf Rüssmann
- Date of birth: 13 October 1950
- Place of birth: Schwelm, West Germany
- Date of death: 2 October 2009 (aged 58)
- Place of death: Steinhagen, Germany
- Height: 1.85 m (6 ft 1 in)
- Position: Defender

Youth career
- 1962–1969: FC Schwelm 06

Senior career*
Years	Team	Apps	(Gls)
1969–1973	FC Schalke 04	105	(10)
1973	Club Brugge	11	(0)
1974–1980	FC Schalke 04	199	(20)
1980–1985	Borussia Dortmund	149	(18)
Total		464	(48)

International career
1977–1978	West Germany	20	(1)
- * Club domestic league appearances and goals

Rolf Rüssmann (13 October 1950 – 2 October 2009) was a German international footballer who played as a defender for FC Schalke 04, Club Brugge and Borussia Dortmund.

== Player bio ==
In 1969, FC Schalke 04 paid FC Schwelm 06 38,000 Deutsche Mark to sign promising stopper Rüssmann, who did not enjoy the best of starts at the Gelsenkirchen-based outfit under Rudi Gutendorf, but then gained more regular appearances for the club and seemed destined for a successful career. A German Cup winner with FC Schalke 04 in 1972, his career was brought to a halt after evidence proved Rüssmann was one of those players of FC Schalke 04 that got bribed by Arminia Bielefeld for fixing the result of a head-to-head Bundesliga match of both clubs on 17 April 1971, for the benefit of Bielefeld. Initially Rüssmann (among other Schalke players) had controverted those claims. Rüssmann was one of the crop of players that committed perjury in the affair and got, as a consequence, punished with a fine by a court in 1975. In 1973 (and shortly in the course of the 1976–77 season), Rüssmann was banned temporarily from club action by the German Football Association, but given the allowance for appearances in foreign leagues. So he left FC Schalke 04 in 1973 to see out his Bundesliga ban with Belgian outfit Club Brugge (11 matches, 0 goals). Returning to Schalke afterwards, Rüssmann stayed on with the club until December 1980. Cash-strapped, Schalke had to sell him to arch-rival side Borussia Dortmund at that time with Rüssmann staying on at Westfalenstadion until he retired in 1985 after 48 goals in 453 Bundesliga matches. Before the 2015/15 season only 23 players had amassed more appearances in the Bundesliga than Rüssmann.

A respected youth international for West Germany, Rüssmann was already on the verge of a West Germany debut in 1971, but then saw his hopes ruined by his role in the match fixing Bundesligaskandal. Six years after the scandal, he was enjoying a bright season with his club and the German Football Association had eased their restrictions concerning players involved in the scandal (see Klaus Fischer) in the meantime, Rüssmann was re-called by Helmut Schön to debut for the West Germans in a friendly win against Yugoslavia in April 1977. Steady performances lead to more call-ups and regular caps resulted in Rüssmann earning a spot in the 1978 FIFA World Cup squad of West Germany. He came to action in all six matches, but after their (early) elimination he did feature just one more time for his nation in the rest of his career. In total, Rüssmann won 20 caps, scoring one goal (winning goal versus the Soviet Union).

== Honours ==
- DFB-Pokal: 1971–72
- Bundesliga: runner-up 1971–72, 1976–77

== General manager in the Bundesliga ==
In 1987, Rüssmann returned to FC Schalke 04 as an off-pitch authority and was general-manager of the club from 25 February to 10 August 1987. With Borussia Mönchengladbach's veteran general-manager Helmut Grashoff looking for a successor, Rüssmann started to work as assistant to Grashoff at Mönchengladbach in April 1990 and got Grashoff's replacement later on. On 8 July 1992, Rüssmann was sacked by Mönchengladbach, but re-appointed by the club in September 1992 due to a change of view inside the Mönchengladbach presidium. On 10 November 1998, Rüssmann was finally out of the door at Mönchengladbach following a complete change of environment caused by an ongoing disastrous run of results in the Bundesliga since 1996. From 1 February 2001, Rüssmann was general-manager of Bundesliga side VfB Stuttgart, getting the sack by Die Schwaben in December 2002.

== Death ==
He died on 2 October 2009 from prostate cancer less than two weeks before he would have turned 59.

Sporting positions
Preceded by Manfred Burgsmüller	Borussia Dortmund captain 1983–1985	Succeeded by Dirk Hupe
