= Michael Polywka =

German footballer (1944–2009)

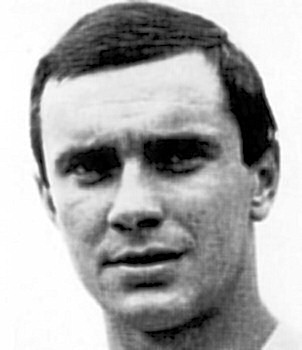

Personal information
- Date of birth: 6 January 1944
- Place of birth: Gleiwitz, Germany
- Date of death: 12 January 2009 (aged 65)
- Place of death: Vienna, Austria
- Height: 1.74 m (5 ft 9 in)
- Position: Midfielder

Youth career
- BSG Motor Raguhn
- BSG Chemie Wolfen

Senior career*
Years	Team	Apps	(Gls)
1962–1966	Carl Zeiss Jena	27	(3)
1966–1971	Eintracht Braunschweig	91	(9)
1971–1972	Hannover 96	8	(0)
1972–1976	FC Admira/Wacker Vienna	69	(7)
Total		195	(19)

International career
- East Germany U18
- East Germany U23
- * Club domestic league appearances and goals

Michael Polywka (6 January 1944 – 12 January 2009) was a German footballer who played as a midfielder.

== Career ==
Polywka started his senior career at SC Motor Jena (renamed into FC Carl Zeiss Jena in 1966) in East Germany. He defected from his team after an away game in the 1966–67 Intertoto Cup against AIK in Sweden to join West German Bundesliga side Eintracht Braunschweig.

Following a one-year suspension by FIFA, Polywka made his debut in the Bundesliga on 19 August 1967, in a game against 1860 Munich. In total, he played five seasons in the Bundesliga for Braunschweig and Hannover 96. In 1972, he joined Austrian club FC Admira/Wacker Vienna.
