= Dietmar Erler =

German footballer

Personal information
- Full name: Dietmar Erler
- Date of birth: 7 April 1947 (age 79)
- Place of birth: Bielefeld, Germany
- Height: 1.80 m (5 ft 11 in)
- Position: Midfielder

Youth career
- Fichte Bielefeld
- Arminia Bielefeld

Senior career*
Years	Team	Apps	(Gls)
1966–1968	Arminia Bielefeld	66	(21)
1968–1970	Borussia Dortmund	28	(2)
1970–1981	Eintracht Braunschweig	263	(54)
Total		357	(77)

International career
1970	West Germany U-23	1	(0)
- * Club domestic league appearances and goals

Dietmar Erler (born 7 April 1947) is a German former professional footballer who played as a midfielder. After two seasons each with Arminia Bielefeld and Borussia Dortmund Erler transferred to Eintracht Braunschweig, where he spent most of his career. After 11 seasons with Braunschweig, in which he played a total of 299 games (scoring 61 goals) in all competitions, Erler retired from football and became a school teacher for sports, mathematics, and geography.
