= Günter Brocker =

German footballer (1925–2015)

Personal information
- Date of birth: 24 May 1925
- Place of birth: Duisburg, Germany
- Date of death: 29 May 2015 (aged 90)
- Position: Left-back

Senior career*
Years	Team	Apps	(Gls)
1949–1952	Duisburger FV		
1952–1961	Schalke 04	152	(0)

Managerial career
- 1961–1965: 1. FC Kaiserslautern
- 1965–1967: Werder Bremen
- 1967–1968: Schalke 04
- 1969–1970: Tennis Borussia Berlin
- 1971–1972: Rot-Weiß Oberhausen
- * Club domestic league appearances and goals

Günter Brocker (24 May 1925 – 29 May 2015) was a German footballer and later manager.

In 1958, he won the German championship with Schalke 04, for which he made 152 appearances in the Oberliga West.
