= Lothar Ulsaß =

German footballer (1940–1999)

Personal information
- Date of birth: 9 September 1940
- Place of birth: Hanover, Germany
- Date of death: 18 June 1999 (aged 58)
- Place of death: Vienna, Austria
- Height: 1.78 m (5 ft 10 in)
- Positions: Midfielder; striker

Youth career
- 1950–1958: Sportfreunde Ricklingen

Senior career*
Years	Team	Apps	(Gls)
1958–1960	Sportfreunde Ricklingen		
1960–1964	Arminia Hannover	116	(105)
1964–1972	Eintracht Braunschweig	201	(84)
1972–1976	Wiener Sport-Club	38	(17)

International career
1961	West Germany U-23	1	(0)
1962	West Germany Amateur	1	(?)
1965	West Germany B	1	(0)
1965–1969	West Germany	10	(8)
- * Club domestic league appearances and goals

Lothar Ulsaß (9 September 1940 – 18 June 1999) was a German professional footballer who played as a midfielder or striker.

== Club career ==
Early in his career Ulsaß was a prolific goalscorer at Arminia Hannover in the second tier Amateuroberliga Niedersachsen and later the first tier Oberliga Nord. Eventually Bundesliga side Eintracht Braunschweig took note of Ulsaß, who had already represented the West Germany under-23 and amateur national teams and was considered a major talent by the German press. He was signed by Braunschweig in 1964 and went on to spend nine seasons in the Bundesliga with the club. Serving as Eintracht's playmaker, Ulsaß was one of the key players in the team's 1966–67 championship-winning season.

Ulsaß was among the players involved in the 1971 Bundesliga scandal. A number of Eintracht Braunschweig players had accepted bonus payments from a third party for a win in their league game against Rot-Weiß Oberhausen, which was illegal (the game eventually ended 1–1). Ulsaß received a two-year ban and a fine, but was later allowed to transfer out of Germany. He joined Wiener Sport-Club in Austria, where he played for four more years until he retired in 1976.

== International career ==
Ulsaß represented the Germany national team ten times, including a 1966 FIFA World Cup qualifier against Cyprus, UEFA Euro 1968 qualifier against Albania, 1970 FIFA World Cup qualifier against Austria and seven friendlies (he scored a hat-trick in 1965 against Austria).

== Personal life ==
Ulsaß died on 18 June 1999 in Vienna from a stroke at the age of 58.

== Career statistics ==
=== International goals ===
Scores and results list Germany's goal tally first, score column indicates score after each Ulsaß goal. Germany's goal tally first:

List of international goals scored by Lothar Ulsaß
No.	Date	Venue	Opponent	Score	Result	Competition
1	9 October 1965	Neckarstadion, Stuttgart, West Germany	Austria	2–1	4–1	Friendly
2	9 October 1965	Neckarstadion, Stuttgart, West Germany	Austria	3–1	4–1	Friendly
3	9 October 1965	Neckarstadion, Stuttgart, West Germany	Austria	4–1	4–1	Friendly
4	19 November 1966	Müngersdorfer Stadion, Cologne, West Germany	Norway	2–0	3–0	Friendly
5	19 November 1966	Müngersdorfer Stadion, Cologne, West Germany	Norway	3–0	3–0	Friendly
6	22 February 1967	Wildparkstadion, Karlsruhe, West Germany	Morocco	1–0	5–1	Friendly
7	22 February 1967	Wildparkstadion, Karlsruhe, West Germany	Morocco	2–0	5–1	Friendly
8	18 December 1968	Estadio Centenario, Montevideo, Uruguay	Chile	1–0	1–2	Friendly

== Honours ==
- Bundesliga: 1967
