= Jürgen Sobieray =

German association football player

Personal information
- Date of birth: 2 November 1950
- Place of birth: Gelsenkirchen, North Rhine-Westphalia, West Germany
- Date of death: 26 March 2021 (aged 70)
- Place of death: Dorsten, North Rhine-Westphalia, Germany
- Height: 1.77 m (5 ft 10 in)
- Position: Defender

Senior career*
Years	Team	Apps	(Gls)
1969–1979	Schalke 04	210	(14)
1979–1980	DSC Wanne-Eickel	31	(1)
1980–1982	Borussia Dortmund	13	(1)
1982–1983	TuS Schloß Neuhaus	18	(0)
- * Club domestic league appearances and goals

Jürgen Sobieray (2 November 1950 – 26 March 2021) was a German footballer who played as a defender. He made 210 appearances in the Bundesliga for Schalke 04 between 1969 and 1979.
