= Klaus Gerwien =

German footballer (1940–2018)

Personal information
- Date of birth: 11 September 1940
- Place of birth: Lyck, Germany
- Date of death: 3 September 2018 (aged 77)
- Height: 1.74 m (5 ft 9 in)
- Position: Striker

Senior career*
Years	Team	Apps	(Gls)
1958–1961	VfL Wolfsburg		
1961–1973	Eintracht Braunschweig	297	(43)

International career
1963	West Germany U-23	1	(0)
1963–1968	West Germany	6	(1)
- * Club domestic league appearances and goals

Klaus Gerwien (11 September 1940 – 3 September 2018) was a German footballer. He spent ten seasons in the Bundesliga with Eintracht Braunschweig. He also represented Germany six times, including a 1970 FIFA World Cup qualifier against Cyprus and five friendlies (he scored an equalizer in a 2–2 tie against Brazil in 1968).
