= Jaro Deppe =

German footballer

Personal information
- Full name: Jaro Deppe
- Date of birth: 10 April 1948 (age 78)
- Place of birth: Braunschweig, Germany
- Position: Striker

Youth career
- SV Süd Braunschweig
- –1967: Eintracht Braunschweig

Senior career*
Years	Team	Apps	(Gls)
1967–1976	Eintracht Braunschweig	79	(28)
Total		79	(28)

International career
1966	West Germany U-18	1	(0)
- * Club domestic league appearances and goals

Jaro Deppe (born 10 April 1948 in Braunschweig) is a retired German footballer. He spent eight seasons in the Bundesliga with Eintracht Braunschweig, as well as one season in the Regionalliga Nord.
