= Klaus Senger =

German footballer (born 1945)

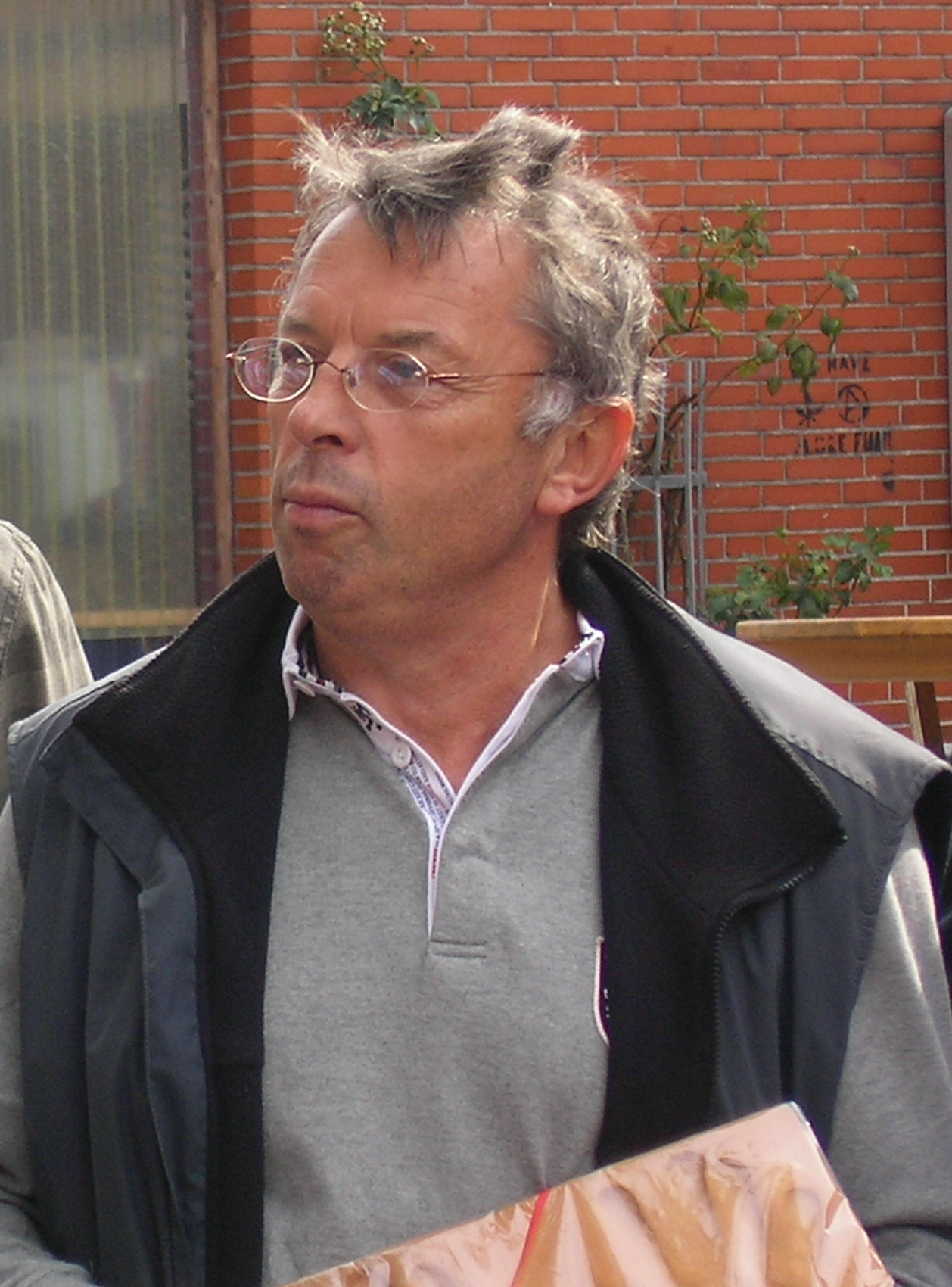

Personal information
- Date of birth: 19 October 1945 (age 80)
- Place of birth: Biederitz, Germany
- Height: 1.68 m (5 ft 6 in)
- Position: Defender

Senior career*
Years	Team	Apps	(Gls)
1965–1971	Schalke 04	102	(3)
1971–1973	Fortuna Düsseldorf	26	(0)
1973–1976	Rot-Weiss Essen	53	(0)
- * Club domestic league appearances and goals

Klaus Senger (born 19 October 1945) is a retired German footballer who played as a defender. He made 181 appearances in the Bundesliga for Schalke 04, Fortuna Düsseldorf, and Rot-Weiss Essen.
