= Hans Siemensmeyer =

German footballer and coach (born 1940)

Personal information
- Date of birth: 23 September 1940 (age 86)
- Place of birth: Oberhausen, Germany
- Height: 1.76 m (5 ft 9 in)
- Position: Midfielder

Senior career*
| Years | Team | Apps | (Gls) |
| 1960–1965 | Rot-Weiß Oberhausen | 152 | (43) |
| 1965–1974 | Hannover 96 | 278 | (72) |
| 1974–1975 | TSV Havelse | | |

International career
| 1967 | Germany | 3 | (2) |

Managerial career
- 1975–1984: TSV Havelse
- 1988–1989: Hannover 96
- * Club domestic league appearances and goals

Hans Siemensmeyer (born 23 September 1940) is a retired German football player and coach.

== Career ==
As a player, he spent nine seasons in the Bundesliga with Hannover 96. He also represented Germany three times, including a UEFA Euro 1968 qualifier against Yugoslavia and two friendlies. He scored two goals in a 5–1 win over France.
