= Eddy Bandura =

German footballer

Personal information
- Full name: Jürgen Bandura
- Date of birth: 22 June 1940
- Place of birth: Oppeln, Germany
- Date of death: 12 May 2018 (aged 77)
- Position: Left winger

Senior career*
Years	Team	Apps	(Gls)
- Westfalia Herne
1964–1974	Hannover 96	298	(34)
- * Club domestic league appearances and goals

Jürgen "Eddy" Bandura (22 June 1940 – 12 May 2018) was a German professional footballer who played as a left winger.

== Career ==
He was Hannover 96's record appearance holder (with 298 Bundesliga games) until he was overtaken by Steven Cherundolo.
