= Herbert Lütkebohmert =

German footballer

Personal information
- Date of birth: 24 March 1948
- Place of birth: Heiden, Germany
- Date of death: 29 October 1993 (aged 45)
- Place of death: Germany
- Height: 1.79 m (5 ft 10 in)
- Position: Midfielder

Senior career*
Years	Team	Apps	(Gls)
1967–1968	TSV Marl-Hüls		
1968–1979	Schalke 04	286	(28)
1979–????	1. FC Bocholt		
- * Club domestic league appearances and goals

Herbert Lütkebohmert (24 March 1948 – 29 October 1993) was a German footballer who played for TSV Marl-Hüls, Schalke 04 and 1. FC Bocholt.
