= List of FC Schalke 04 players =

FC Schalke 04 is a German football club based in Gelsenkirchen. The club was founded in 1904. They currently compete in the Bundesliga.

The following are lists of Schalke 04 players since the formation of the Bundesliga in 1963 and notable club players of the pre-Bundesliga era.

== Players ==
=== Bundesliga era ===
Player: All 577 players who made at least one appearance in a competitive match for Schalke 04 since August 1963 are listed below. 491 of them played in the Bundesliga. 350 players scored at least one goal for the club. 285 of them scored in the Bundesliga.

H Member of the Schalke 04 Hall of Fame ("Ehrenkabine") – 23 players

Nation: GER (341 players); AUT (16); BRA, NED (15); TUR (13); DEN (11); FRA (10); BEL, YUG (8); ESP, USA (7); CZE, GHA, MAR, SUI, URU (6); BIH, GRE, JPN, NOR, POL (5); CRO, HUN, SEN (4); ARG, CMR, KOS, NGA, ROU, RUS, SRB (3); ALG, AUS, ENG, FIN, GEO, KOR, MKD, MLI, PER, SVK, SWE, TOG, UKR, URS (2); ANG, AZE, CHN, COL, IRN, ISL, LUX, POR, TCH, WAL (1)

C Played for their national team in their Schalke 04 career (C = international caps as a Schalke player) – 150 players, 36 for Germany

Position: GK = Goalkeeper (47 players), DF = Defender (168), MF = Midfielder (207), FW = Forward (155)

Club career: First and last years in which the player appeared for the club in a competitive match

A Still actively at Schalke 04 – 26 players (in boldface)

League membership: Bundesliga (1963–1981, 1982–83, 1984–1988, 1991–2021, 2022–23, 2026–current), 2. Bundesliga (1981–82, 1983–84, 1988–1991, 2021–22, 2023–2026)

Total competitive matches (2600): Bundesliga (1842), 2. Bundesliga (326), DFB-Pokal (210), UEFA Cup / Europa League (100), Champions League (70), Ligapokal (22), Cup Winners' Cup (14), UI Cup (12), Supercup (2), Relegation play-offs (2)

Statistics correct as of 22 November 2026.

A • B • C • D • E • F • G • H • I • J • K • L • M • N • O • P • Q • R • S • T • U • V • W • Y • Z

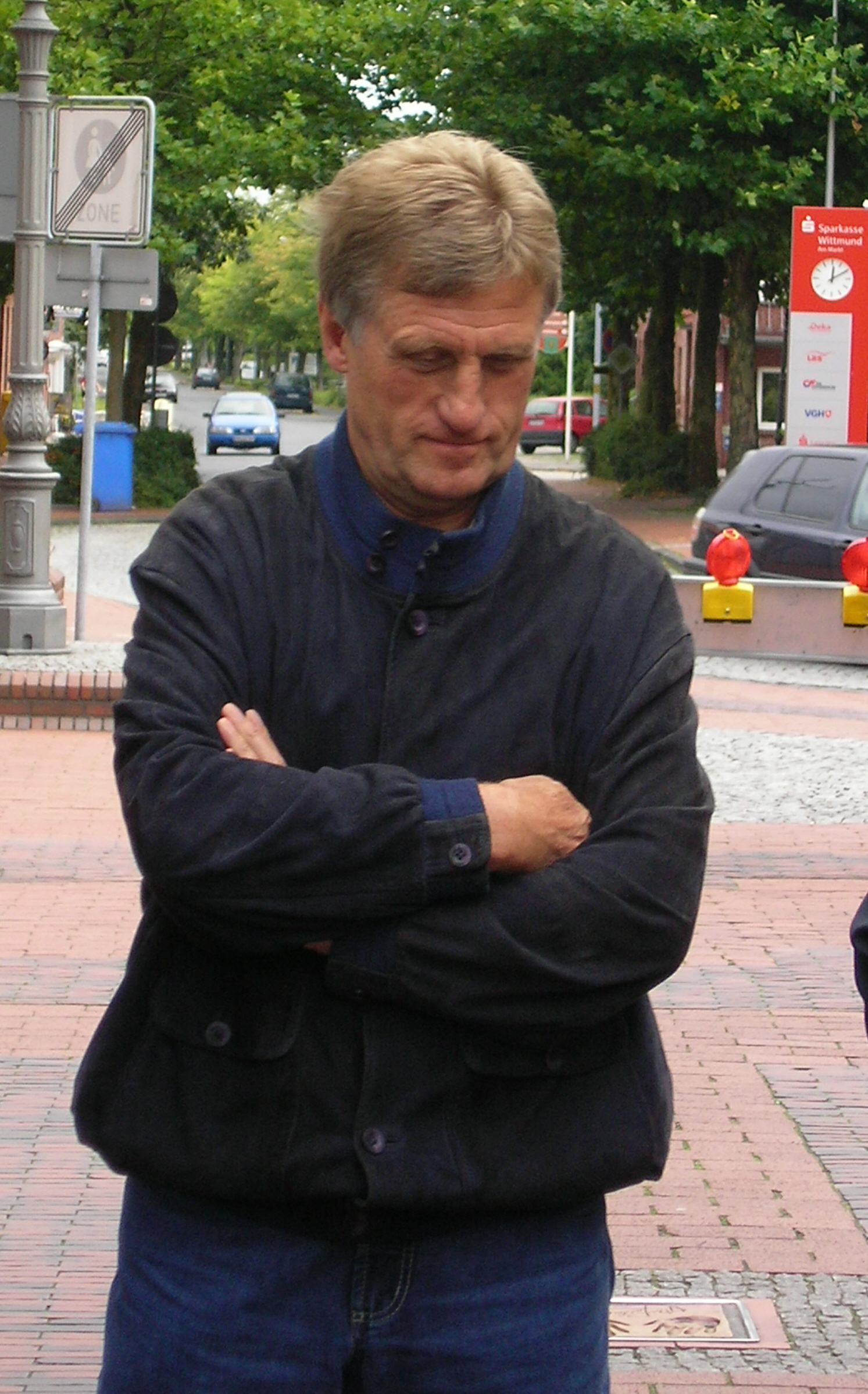
Klaus Fichtel made 556 appearances for Schalke between 1965 and 1988.

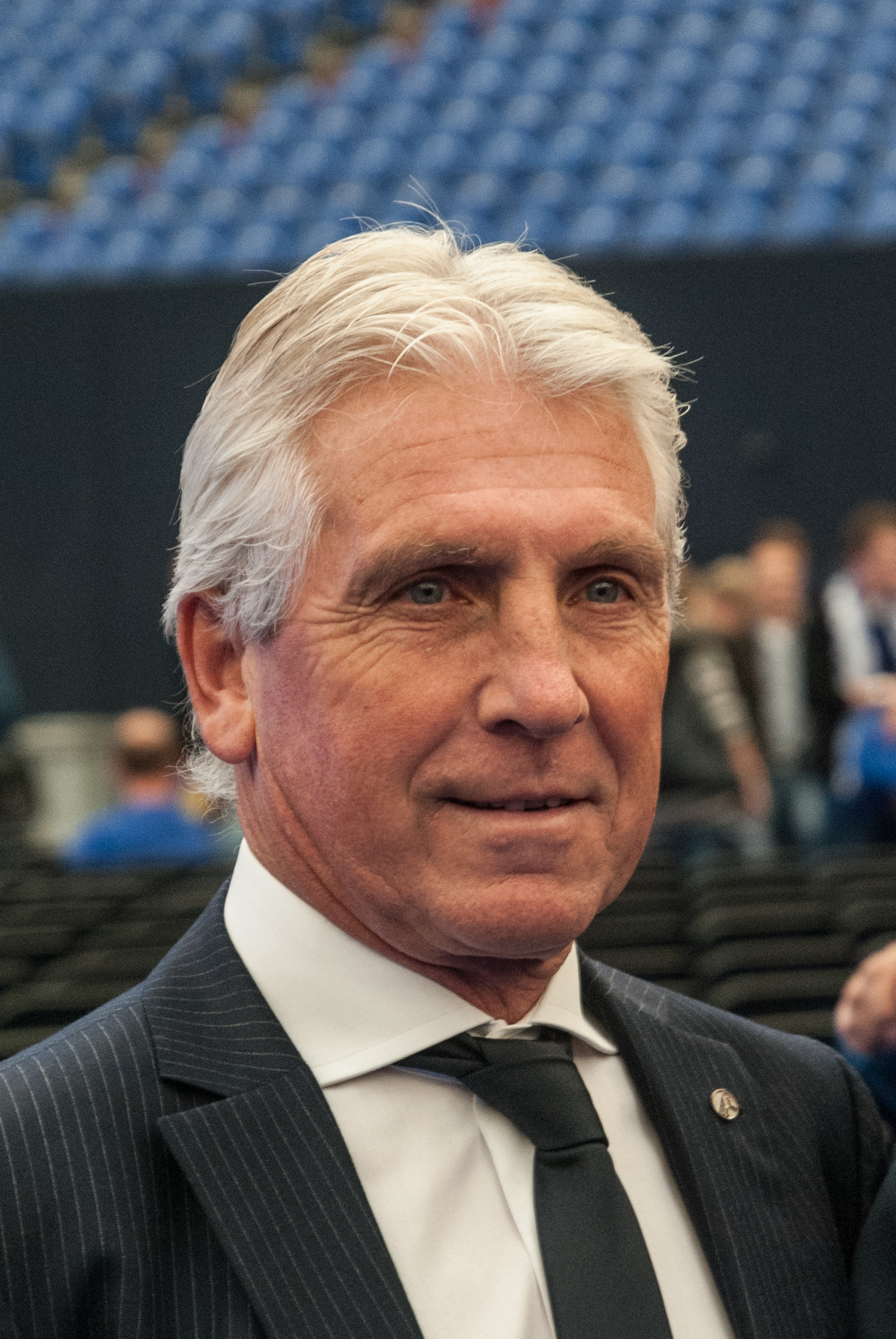
Klaus Fischer scored 226 goals in 349 appearances for Schalke between 1970 and 1981.

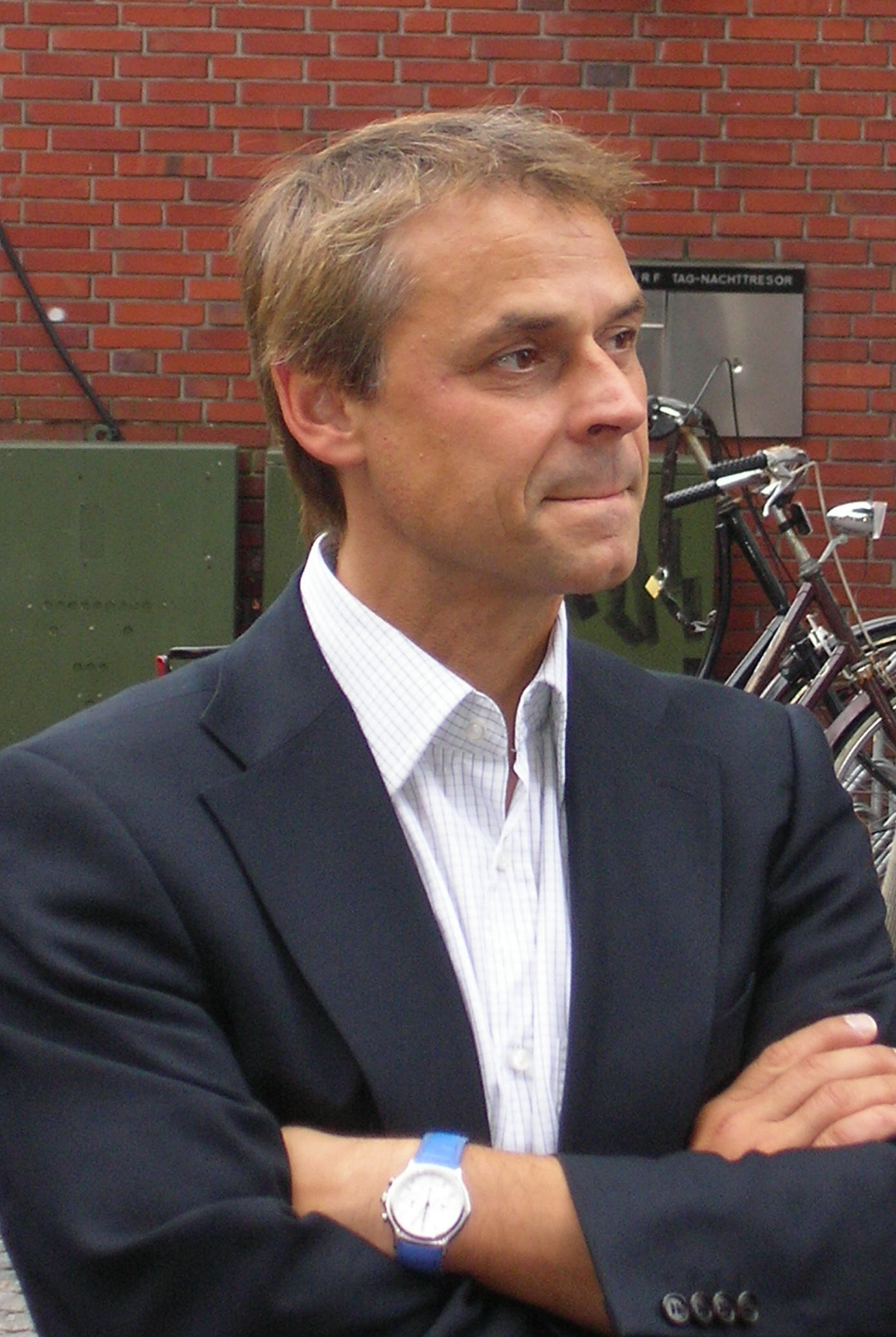
Olaf Thon made 384 appearances for Schalke between 1983 and 2002.

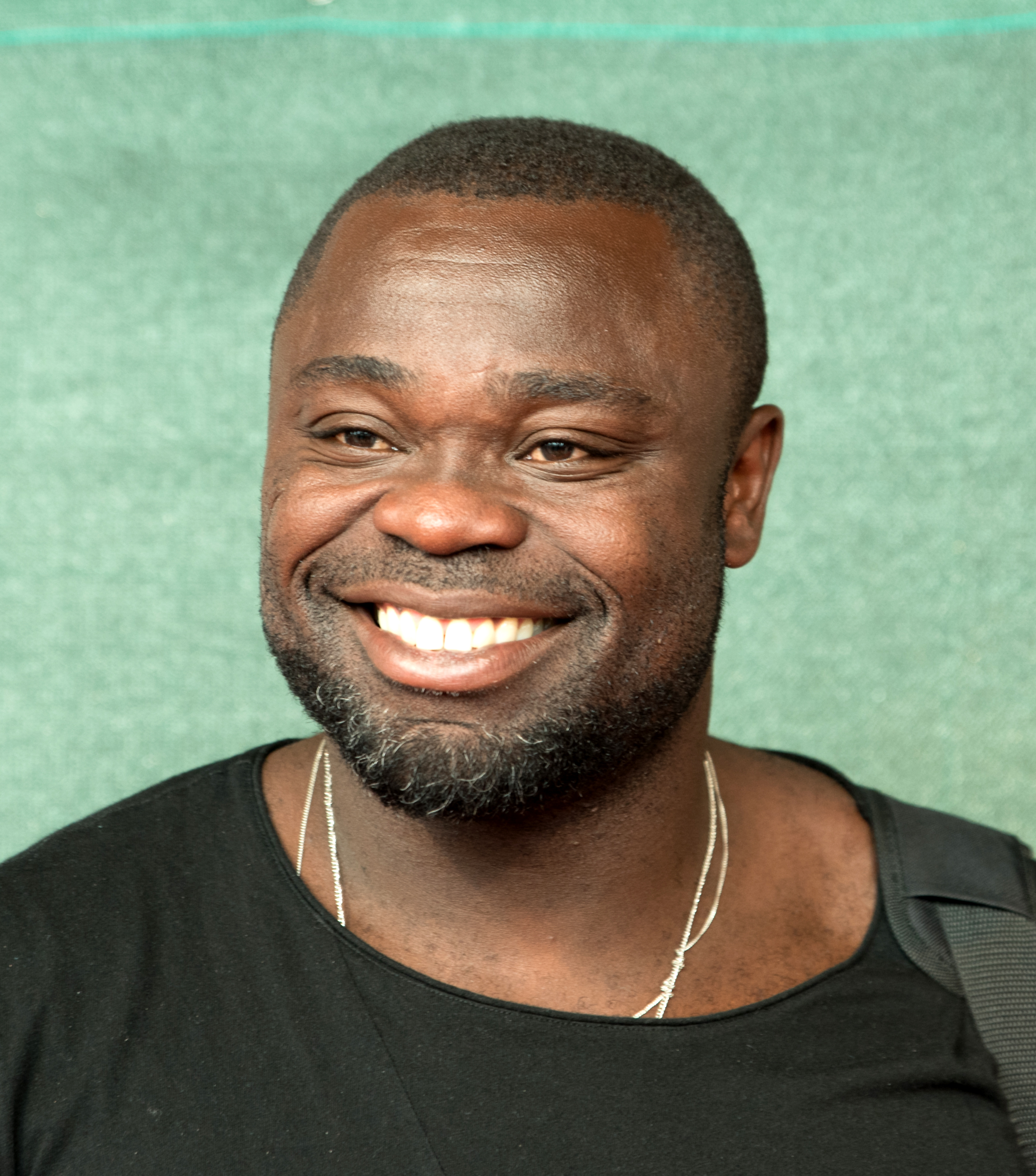
Gerald Asamoah made 381 appearances for Schalke between 1999 and 2013.

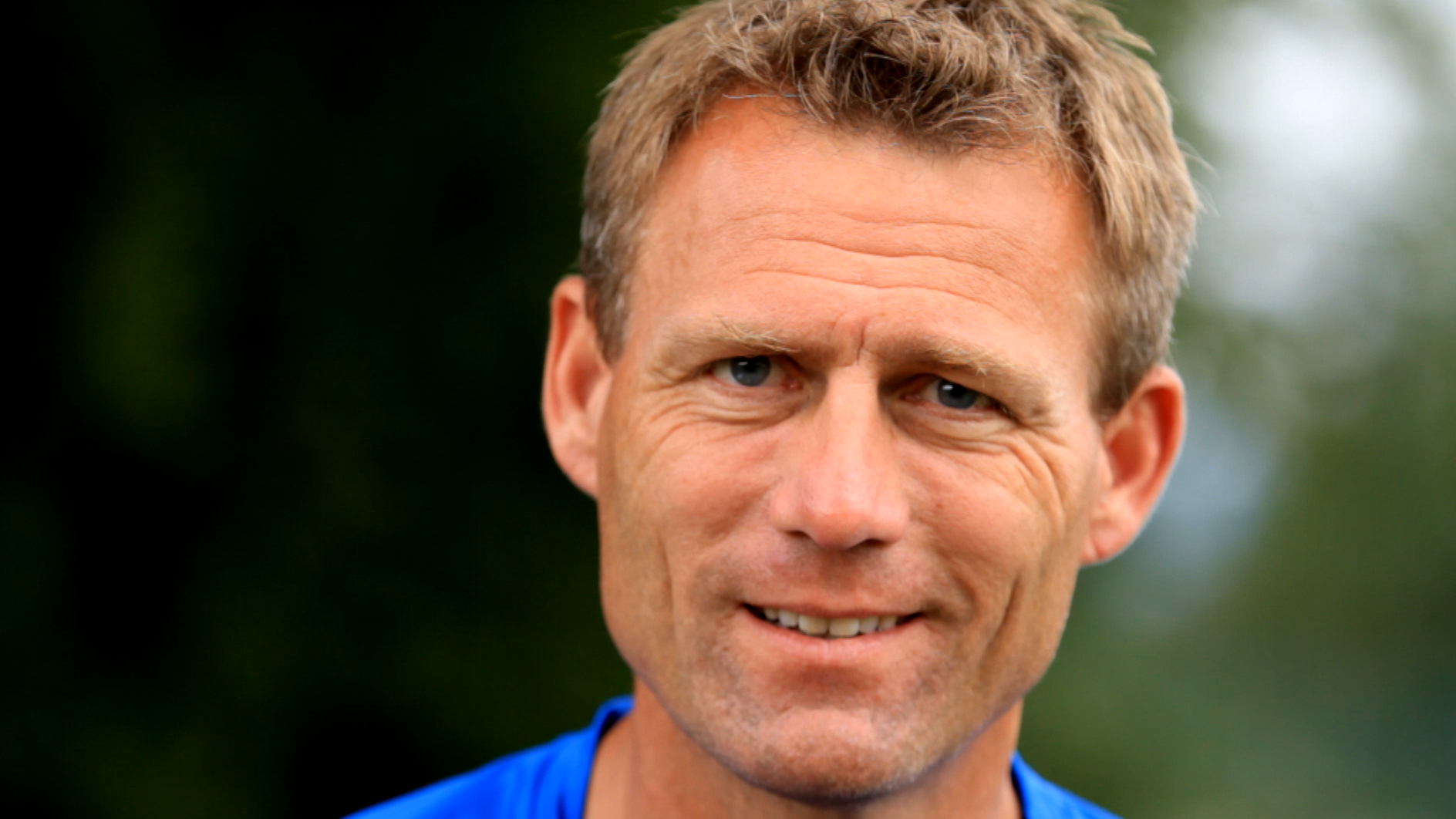
Ingo Anderbrügge made 355 appearances for Schalke between 1988 and 1999.

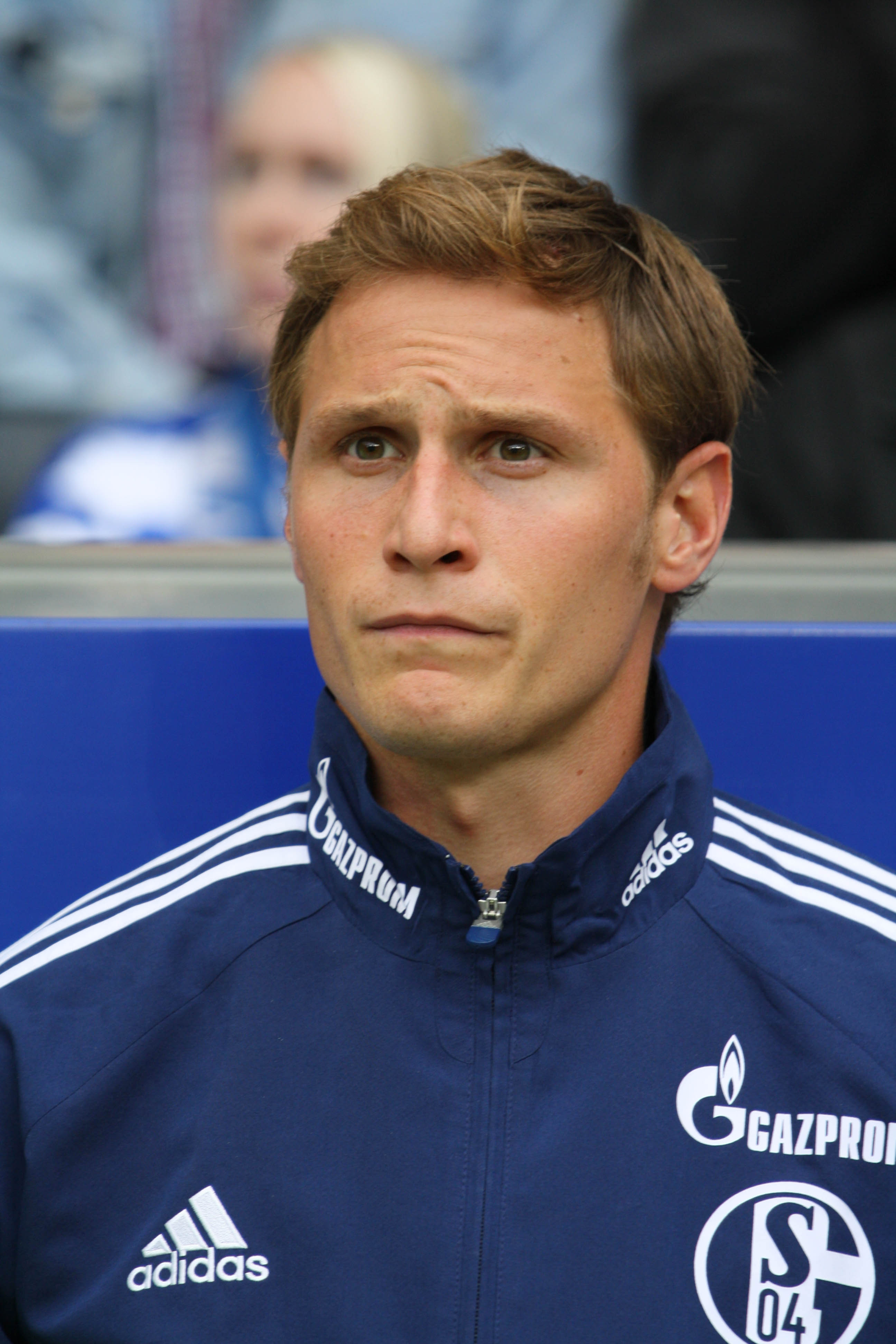
Benedikt Höwedes made 335 appearances for Schalke between 2007 and 2017.

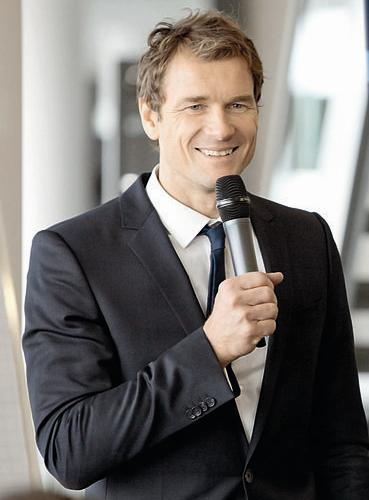
Jens Lehmann made 312 appearances for Schalke between 1988 and 1998.

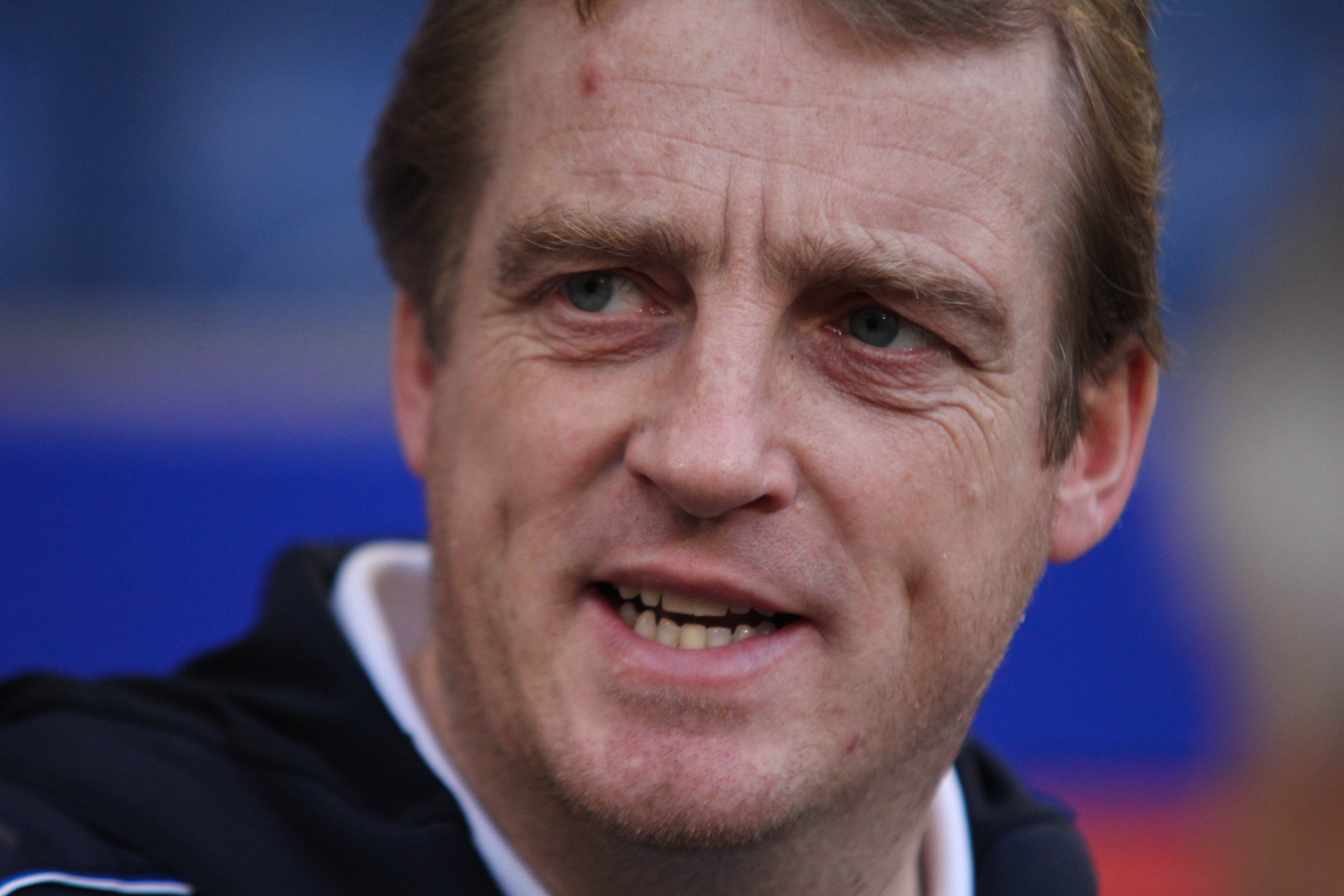
Mike Büskens made 302 appearances for Schalke between 1992 and 2002.

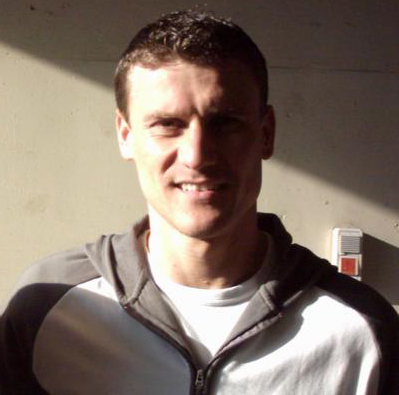
Ebbe Sand scored 104 goals in 282 appearances for Schalke between 1999 and 2006.

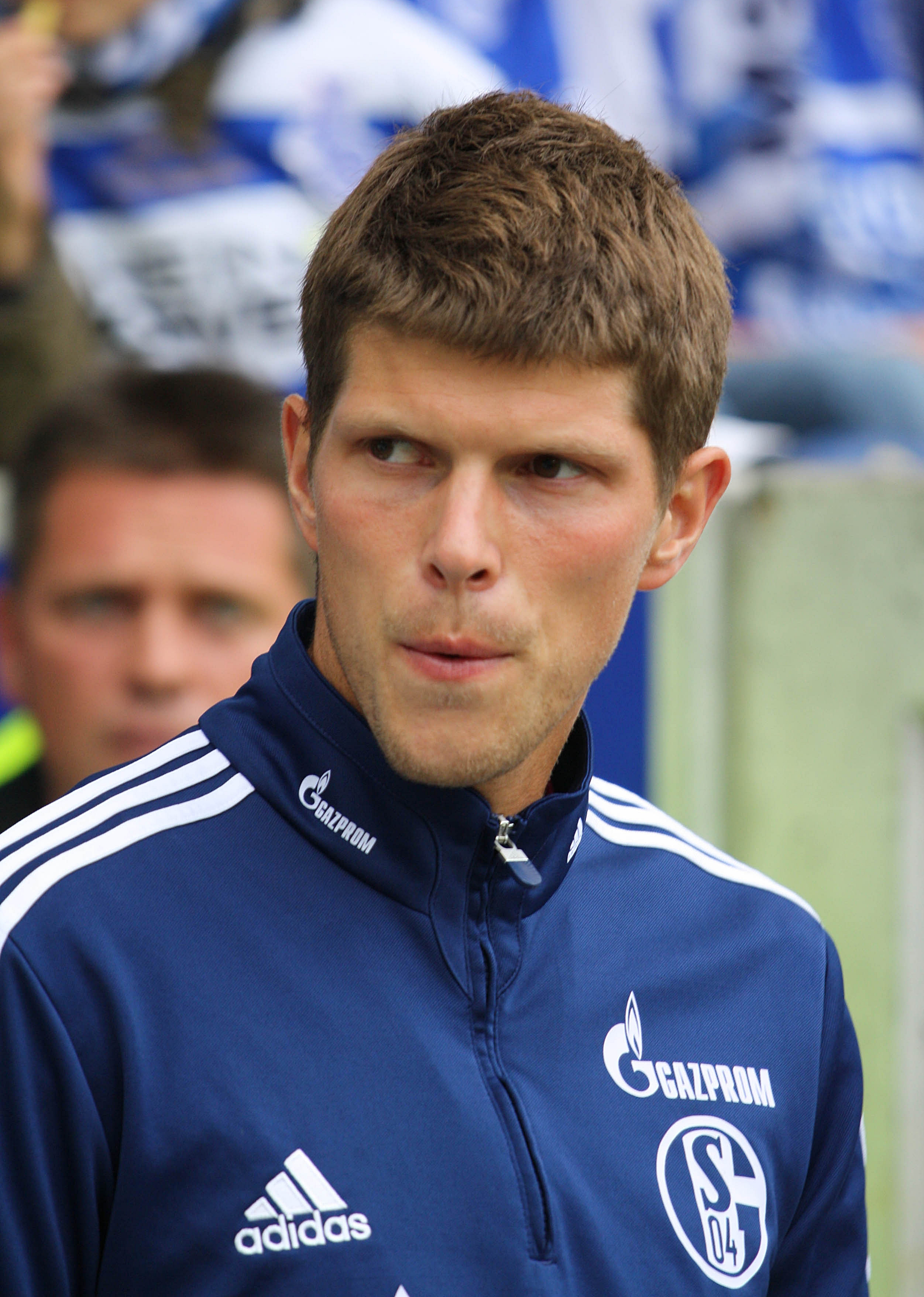
Klaas-Jan Huntelaar scored 128 goals in 249 appearances for Schalke between 2010 and 2021.

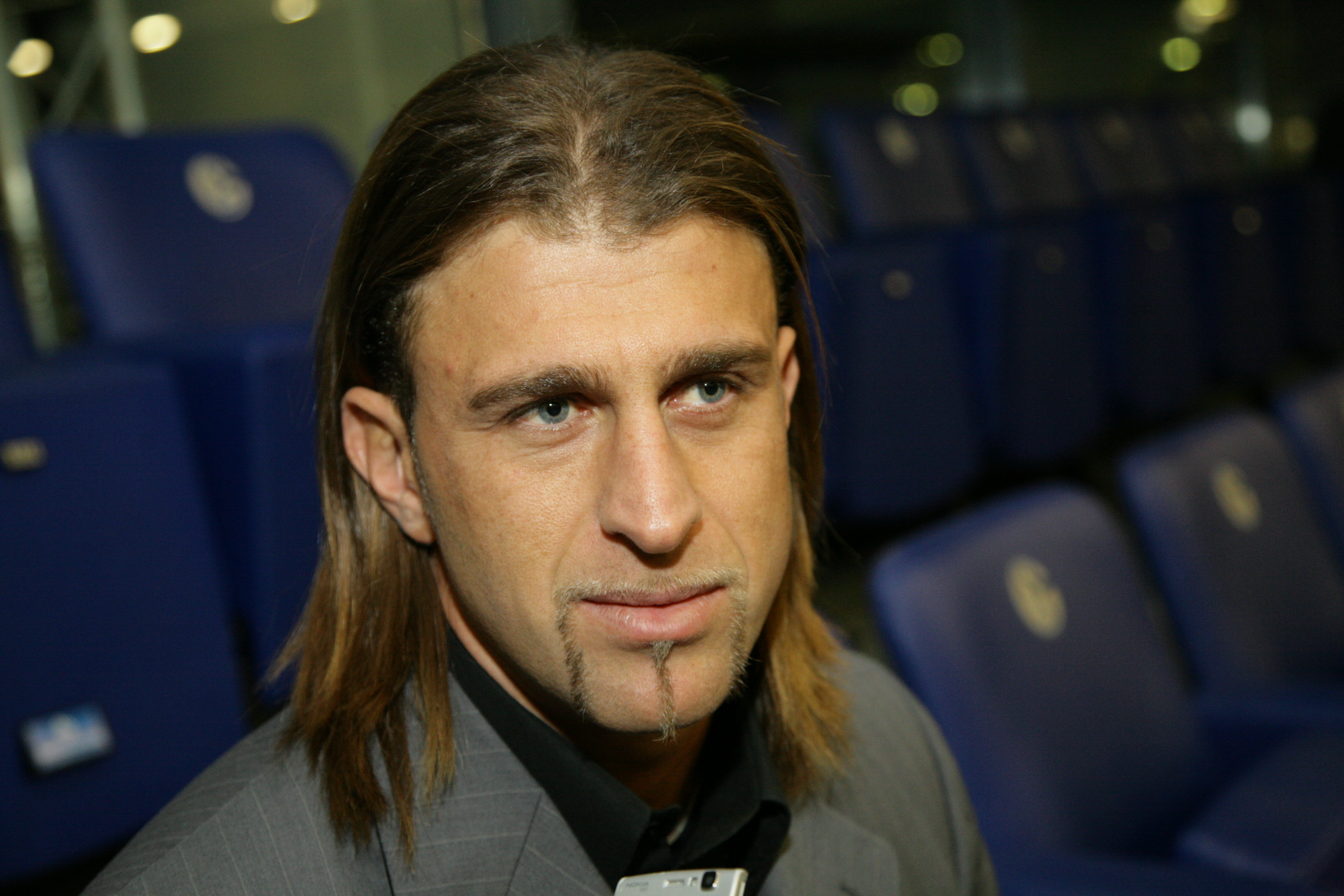
Marcelo Bordon made 231 appearances for Schalke between 2004 and 2010.

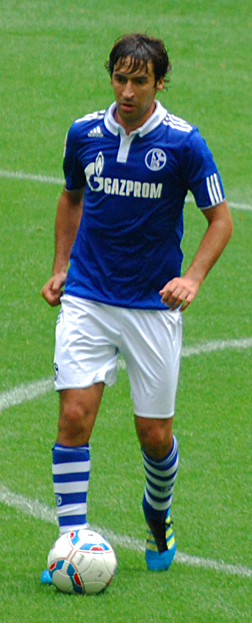
Raúl scored 40 goals in 98 appearances for Schalke between 2010 and 2012.

Player	H	Nat.	C	Pos.	Club career	A	League		Total	
Player	H	Nat.	C	Pos.	Club career	A	Apps	Goals	Apps	Goals
Hans-Joachim Abel		(Germany)		FW	1982–1984		63	23	73	29
Mathias Abel		(Germany)		DF	2006		1	0	4	0
Rüdiger Abramczik	✓	(Germany)	19	FW	1973–1980, 1987		202	44	235	58
Volker Abramczik		(Germany)		FW	1981–1984		55	13	61	13
**Junior Adamu**		(Austria)	2	FW	2026–	✓	8	1	10	2
Ibrahim Afellay		(Netherlands)	3	MF	2012		10	2	15	4
Victor Agali		(Nigeria)	7	FW	2001–2004		54	14	74	20
Aílton		(Brazil)		FW	2004–2005		29	14	44	20
Jörg Albracht		(Germany)		GK	1995		2	0	2	0
Alcides		(Brazil)		DF	2003		6	0	10	0
Ünal Alpuğan		(Germany)		MF	1999–2000		42	1	44	1
Halil Altıntop		(Turkey)	21	FW	2006–2009		96	16	129	22
Hamit Altıntop		(Turkey)	32	MF	2003–2007		113	8	160	14
Ingo Anderbrügge	✓	(Germany)		MF	1988–1999		316	82	355	88
Markus Anfang		(Germany)		MF	1997		3	0	5	0
Anthony Annan		(Ghana)	4	MF	2011, 2014		12	0	14	0
Christopher Antwi-Adjei		(Ghana)		MF	2024–2026		34	2	35	2
Dennis Aogo		(Germany)		DF	2013–2017		65	0	92	3
**Adil Aouchiche**		(Algeria)	3	MF	2026–	✓	24	4	26	4
Gerald Asamoah	✓	(Germany)	43	FW	1999–2010, 2013		279	44	381	64
Donis Avdijaj		(Kosovo)	2	FW	2016–2017		9	2	12	2
Danilo Avelar		(Brazil)		DF	2011		3	0	3	0
Mehmet-Can Aydın		(Turkey)		MF	2021–2025		69	1	74	1
Kaan Ayhan		(Turkey)		MF	2013–2015		31	1	40	1
**Mertcan Ayhan**		(Turkey)		DF	2025–	✓	31	0	35	0
Mimoun Azaouagh		(Germany)		MF	2006–2007		9	0	16	1
Pape Meïssa Ba		(Senegal)		FW	2025		13	2	13	2
**Janik Bachmann**		(Germany)		MF	2024–	✓	50	3	54	3
Holger Badstuber		(Germany)		DF	2017		10	0	12	0
Zlatan Bajramović		(Bosnia and Herzegovina)	12	MF	2005–2007		64	6	91	8
Éder Balanta		(Colombia)		MF	2023		6	0	6	0
Manfred Bär		(Germany)		FW	1980–1981		2	0	2	0
Aymen Barkok		(Morocco)		MF	2025		6	0	6	0
Tranquillo Barnetta		(Switzerland)	9	MF	2012–2015		44	3	60	3
Michel Bastos		(Brazil)		MF	2013		14	4	16	5
Timo Baumgartl		(Germany)		DF	2023–2024		12	0	13	0
Alexander Baumjohann		(Germany)		MF	2006, 2010–2012		30	0	47	0
Hans-Jürgen Becher		(Germany)		DF	1963–1971		201	2	229	4
Karl-Heinz Bechmann		(Germany)		MF	1963–1967		75	7	81	8
**Timo Becker**		(Germany)		DF	2019–2021, 2025–	✓	69	0	76	0
**Vitalie Becker**		(Germany)		DF	2025–	✓	29	2	32	2
Rachid Belarbi		(Germany)		MF	1988–1990		45	0	48	0
Younès Belhanda		(Morocco)	1	MF	2016		15	2	17	2
Yassin Ben Balla		(France)		MF	2025		1	1	1	1
Nabil Bentaleb		(Algeria)	16	MF	2016–2021		82	12	107	19
Klaus Berge		(Germany)		MF	1983–1985, 1987		36	2	43	2
Winfried Berkemeier		(Germany)		MF	1979–1980		29	5	34	5
Manfred Berz		(Germany)		MF	1963–1965		30	8	34	9
Marinus Bester		(Germany)		FW	1993		5	0	6	0
Til Bettenstaedt		(Germany)		FW	1995		1	0	1	0
Klaus Beverungen		(Germany)		MF	1970–1974		49	6	67	7
Siegmar Bieber		(Germany)		MF	1989–1990		8	1	8	1
André Bistram		(Germany)		FW	1986–1987		38	9	39	9
Ulrich Bittcher		(Germany)		MF	1976–1983		206	29	234	31
Horst Blechinger		(Germany)		FW	1966–1968		64	6	68	8
Kevin-Prince Boateng		(Ghana)	6	MF	2013–2015		46	6	60	7
Sebastian Boenisch		(Germany)		DF	2005–2006		9	0	14	0
Jörg Böhme		(Germany)	10	MF	2000–2004		101	23	131	31
Mario Boljat		(Socialist Federal Republic of Yugoslavia)		MF	1979		9	2	10	2
Hannes Bongartz		(Germany)	4	MF	1974–1978		131	24	156	28
Marcelo Bordon	✓	(Brazil)		DF	2004–2010		168	14	231	18
Rainer Borgmeier		(Germany)		FW	1992–1993		2	0	2	0
Aleksandr Borodyuk		(Soviet Union) (Russia)	6	FW	1989–1993		124	41	130	42
Nassim Boujellab		(Morocco)	3	MF	2019–2021		30	1	34	1
Can Bozdoğan		(Germany)		MF	2020–2021		17	0	18	0
Nico Braun		(Luxembourg)	9	FW	1971–1973		35	14	52	23
Josef Broden		(Germany)		GK	1963–1965		5	0	5	0
Kai Bruckmann		(Germany)		MF	1994		1	0	1	0
Jeffrey Bruma		(Netherlands)		DF	2019		9	0	12	0
Cédric Brunner		(Switzerland)		DF	2022–2024		45	0	47	0
Hans-Günter Bruns		(Germany)		DF	1975–1976		20	2	22	2
Theo Bücker		(Germany)		MF	1981–1983		54	5	61	5
Rainer Budde		(Germany)		MF	1972–1975		50	12	59	14
Marius Bülter		(Germany)		FW	2021–2023		65	21	69	23
Taylan Bulut		(Germany)		DF	2024–2025		27	1	29	1
Dieter Burdenski		(Germany)		GK	1970–1971		3	0	6	0
Henning Bürger		(Germany)		DF	1991		5	0	6	0
Guido Burgstaller		(Austria)	16	FW	2017–2020		95	24	119	32
Mike Büskens	✓	(Germany)		MF	1992–2002		257	13	302	17
Júnior Caiçara		(Brazil)		DF	2015–2016		26	0	41	1
Kerim Çalhanoğlu		(Germany)		MF	2021–2022		17	0	18	0
Daniel Caligiuri		(Germany)		MF	2017–2020		108	17	130	21
Jonas Carls		(Germany)		DF	2019		1	0	1	0
Niklas Castelle		(Germany)		FW	2024		1	0	1	0
Angelos Charisteas		(Greece)		FW	2011		4	1	5	1
Eric Maxim Choupo-Moting		(Cameroon)	15	FW	2014–2017		82	18	106	22
Bent Christensen		(Denmark)	9	FW	1991–1993		49	8	52	9
Darko Churlinov		(North Macedonia)	15	MF	2021–2022, 2024		32	3	33	3
Ibrahima Cissé		(Mali)	2	DF	2023–2024		8	1	9	1
Christian Clemens		(Germany)		MF	2013–2014		19	0	28	0
Hubert Clute-Simon		(Germany)		MF	1982–1984		48	12	56	13
Coke		(Spain)		DF	2017		9	1	10	1
Heinz Crawatzo		(Germany)		DF	1964–1965		27	2	29	2
Simon Cziommer		(Germany)		MF	2003, 2005		2	0	9	1
Rufat Dadashov		(Azerbaijan)		FW	2021		2	0	2	0
Dietmar Danner		(Germany)		MF	1980–1981		19	0	19	0
Johan de Kock		(Netherlands)	1	DF	1996–1999		83	6	104	8
Ciprian Deac		(Romania)	6	MF	2010–2011		2	0	5	0
Chad Deering		(United States)	2	MF	1993–1994		6	0	6	0
Michael Delura		(Germany)		FW	2003–2005		23	4	30	4
Herbert Demange		(Germany)		FW	1977–1979		31	4	38	5
Franco Di Santo		(Argentina)		FW	2015–2018		71	5	88	12
Bernd Dierßen		(Germany)		MF	1983–1987		124	13	139	16
Tim-Justin Dietrich		(Germany)		DF	2026		1	0	1	0
Bernard Dietz		(Germany)		DF	1982–1986		135	8	158	11
Serhiy Dikhtiar		(Ukraine)		FW	1994–1995		13	2	16	3
**Junior Dina Ebimbe**		(Cameroon)		MF	2026–	✓	9	0	11	0
Herbert Dittrich		(Germany)		FW	1967–1968		4	0	4	0
Anton Donkor		(Germany)		DF	2024–2025		28	0	31	0
Thomas Dooley		(United States)	18	DF	1995–1997		28	3	35	3
Kristijan Đorđević		(Serbia)		MF	2001–2002		10	0	16	0
Norbert Dörmann		(Germany)		DF	1977–1979		27	2	33	2
Julian Draxler		(Germany)	15	FW	2011–2015		119	18	170	30
Dominick Drexler		(Germany)		MF	2021–2024		61	8	65	11
Manfred Drexler		(Germany)		MF	1979–1984		129	28	144	35
Manfred Dubski		(Germany)		MF	1972–1978		73	2	97	4
Arnold Dybek		(Germany)		MF	1997		1	0	1	0
**Edin Džeko**		(Bosnia and Herzegovina)	6	FW	2026–	✓	19	6	21	8
Vilson Džoni		(Socialist Federal Republic of Yugoslavia)		DF	1979–1981		55	6	58	7
Dieter Eckstein		(Germany)		FW	1993–1995		30	4	31	5
Reiner Edelmann		(Germany)		FW	1987–1990		95	12	101	12
Edu		(Brazil)		FW	2010–2013		43	5	57	7
Peter Ehmke		(Germany)		FW	1972–1974		40	6	50	12
Yves Eigenrauch		(Germany)		DF	1990–2001		236	4	269	5
René Eijkelkamp		(Netherlands)		FW	1997–1999		44	6	56	9
Norbert Eilenfeldt		(Germany)		MF	1984–1985		17	1	18	1
**Soufiane El-Faouzi**		(Morocco)	2	MF	2025–	✓	43	2	46	2
Norbert Elgert	✓	(Germany)		FW	1975, 1978–1982		77	17	85	18
Josef Elting		(Germany)		GK	1965–1970		64	0	70	0
Breel Embolo		(Switzerland)	18	FW	2016–2019		48	10	61	12
Peter Endrulat		(Germany)		GK	1974		1	0	1	0
Orlando Engelaar		(Netherlands)	1	MF	2008–2009		25	0	35	1
Hermann Erlhoff		(Germany)		MF	1967–1970		75	8	87	8
Fabian Ernst		(Germany)	4	MF	2005–2009		106	1	146	3
Christian Erwig		(Germany)		FW	2007		1	0	1	0
Sergio Escudero		(Spain)		DF	2010–2012		12	0	22	0
Ralf Fährmann		(Germany)		GK	2008, 2011–2024		227	0	289	0
Jefferson Farfán		(Peru)	28	FW	2008–2015		170	39	228	53
Klaus Fichtel	✓	(Germany)	23	DF	1965–1980, 1985–1988		477	14	556	17
Christos Figas		(Greece)		MF	1988		3	0	5	0
Klaus Fischer	✓	(Germany)	30	FW	1970–1981		295	182	349	226
Egon Flad		(Germany)		MF	1989–1992		74	6	77	6
Florian Flick		(Germany)		MF	2021–2022		39	1	42	1
Michael Fonfara		(Germany)		FW	1988		2	0	2	0
Martin Fraisl		(Austria)		GK	2021–2022		26	0	26	0
Steffen Freund		(Germany)		MF	1991–1993		53	3	56	3
Karl-Heinz Frey		(Germany)		FW	1972		9	0	19	2
Michael Frey		(Switzerland)		FW	2023		15	0	15	0
Marvin Friedrich		(Germany)		DF	2014–2016		7	0	9	0
Christian Fuchs		(Austria)	26	DF	2011–2015		99	4	136	8
Andreas Gaber		(Germany)		MF	1991		3	0	3	0
Jürgen-Michael Galbierz		(Germany)		DF	1968–1971		27	1	30	1
**Adrian Gantenbein**		(Switzerland)		DF	2024–	✓	41	2	43	2
Thomas Gaßmann		(Germany)		DF	1988		2	0	2	0
Mario Gavranović		(Switzerland)	2	FW	2010–2011		10	0	14	4
Hans-Jürgen Gede		(Germany)		MF	1975–1977		33	2	39	3
Holger Gehrke		(Germany)		GK	1992–1993		40	0	41	0
Winfried Geier		(Germany)		DF	1979–1984		87	5	95	5
Johannes Geis		(Germany)		MF	2015–2017		46	2	61	5
Waldemar Gerhardt		(Germany)		FW	1963–1965		52	20	58	25
Fabian Giefer		(Germany)		GK	2015–2016		2	0	3	0
Martin Giesel		(Germany)		MF	1987–1988		17	1	18	1
Eduard Glieder		(Austria)	2	FW	2003–2004		16	2	17	2
Bjarne Goldbæk		(Denmark)	1	MF	1987–1989		74	8	79	11
Benjamin Goller		(Germany)		MF	2018		0	0	1	0
Christian Gomis		(Senegal)		FW	2025–2026		19	1	19	1
Michaël Goossens		(Belgium)	4	FW	1997–1999		51	5	64	8
Leon Goretzka		(Germany)	16	MF	2013–2018		116	14	147	19
**Robin Gosens**		(Germany)		DF	2026–	✓	8	1	9	1
Dieter Götz		(Germany)		FW	1987–1988		19	6	20	6
Bernd Grabosch		(Germany)		MF	1986		11	0	12	0
Siegfried Grams		(Germany)		DF	1966		1	0	1	0
Werner Grau		(Germany)		FW	1964–1966		12	3	14	5
Jürgen Gredig		(Germany)		DF	1991–1992		5	0	5	0
Michael Gregoritsch		(Austria)		FW	2020		14	1	16	1
Leo Greiml		(Austria)		DF	2022–2023		7	0	7	0
Frode Grodås		(Norway)	5	GK	1998–2001		3	0	6	0
Volkmar Groß		(Germany)		GK	1977–1978		35	0	45	0
Carlos Grossmüller		(Uruguay)	1	MF	2007–2008		13	1	22	1
Max Grüger		(Germany)		MF	2024–2025		27	1	30	1
Michael Gspurning		(Austria)		GK	2015		0	0	1	0
Ayman Gülaşı		(Turkey)		MF	2025		1	0	1	0
Günter Güttler		(Germany)		DF	1990–1994		119	4	125	5
Tamás Hajnal		(Hungary)		MF	1999–2000		8	0	8	0
Tomasz Hajto		(Poland)	30	DF	2000–2004		104	6	141	9
Ilyes Hamache		(France)		FW	2024–2025		11	0	11	0
Mike Hanke		(Germany)	5	FW	2002–2005		58	7	87	23
Wilfried Hannes		(Germany)		DF	1986–1988		48	4	49	4
Ľuboš Hanzel		(Slovakia)		DF	2009		1	0	1	0
Junmin Hao		(China)	10	MF	2010–2011		14	0	19	0
Markus Happe		(Germany)		DF	1999–2001		26	1	28	1
Amine Harit		(Morocco)	11	MF	2017–2021		102	12	119	13
Frank Hartmann		(Germany)		MF	1984–1986		52	20	57	24
Franz Hasil		(Austria)	2	MF	1968–1969		23	5	25	5
Justin Heekeren		(Germany)		GK	2023–2025		31	0	33	0
Dieter Heimen		(Germany)		GK	1987		2	0	2	0
Christofer Heimeroth		(Germany)		GK	2004–2005		8	0	9	0
Oliver Held		(Germany)		MF	1995–2001		96	4	110	5
Markus Heppke		(Germany)		MF	2006		1	0	2	0
Matthias Herget		(Germany)		DF	1989–1990		19	0	20	0
Christian Herrmann		(Germany)		DF	1988		1	0	1	0
Günther Herrmann		(Germany)	2	MF	1963–1967		110	22	119	27
Hendrik Herzog		(Germany)		DF	1991–1995		73	9	78	10
Norbert Heßling		(Germany)		MF	1972		0	0	1	0
Antoine Hey		(Germany)		MF	1992–1993		19	0	19	0
Timo Hildebrand		(Germany)		GK	2011–2013		39	0	58	0
Herbert Höbusch		(Germany)		MF	1967–1969		53	0	58	0
Uwe Höfer		(Germany)		MF	1977–1980		10	2	13	4
Ron-Thorben Hoffmann		(Germany)		GK	2024		2	0	3	0
Jonas Hofmann		(Germany)		MF	2020		1	0	1	0
Marco Höger		(Germany)		MF	2011–2016		88	7	127	7
Pierre-Emile Højbjerg		(Denmark)	10	MF	2015–2016		23	0	30	0
**Emil Højlund**		(Denmark)		FW	2024–	✓	14	0	15	0
Dragan Holcer		(Socialist Federal Republic of Yugoslavia)		DF	1981–1982		12	0	12	0
Lewis Holtby		(Germany)	1	MF	2009, 2011–2013		55	10	79	13
Paul Holz		(Germany)		MF	1971–1974		59	3	73	5
Tim Hoogland		(Germany)		DF	2004–2007, 2012–2014		34	0	42	1
Matthew Hoppe		(United States)	5	FW	2020–2021		23	6	25	6
Egon Horst		(Germany)		DF	1963–1964		39	1	42	1
Benedikt Höwedes	✓	(Germany)	44	DF	2007–2017		240	12	335	23
Hartmut Huhse		(Germany)		DF	1971–1975		113	1	142	1
Klaas-Jan Huntelaar		(Netherlands)	40	FW	2010–2017, 2021		184	84	249	128
**Hee-chan Hwang**		(South Korea)	4	FW	2026–	✓	8	0	9	0
Vedad Ibišević		(Bosnia and Herzegovina)		FW	2020		4	0	5	1
Besart Ibraimi		(North Macedonia)	2	FW	2010		2	0	2	0
Blendi Idrizi		(Kosovo)	9	MF	2021–2024		41	3	43	3
Uwe Igler		(Germany)		FW	1989		10	0	10	0
Pablo Insua		(Spain)		DF	2018		1	0	1	0
Ko Itakura		(Japan)	7	DF	2021–2022		31	4	32	4
Andreas Ivan		(Romania)		MF	2023		1	0	1	0
Abdul Iyodo		(Nigeria)		FW	2002		4	0	6	0
Michael Jakobs		(Germany)		DF	1983–1988		134	7	149	10
Norbert Janzon		(Germany)		FW	1981–1983		58	15	61	16
Kurt Jara		(Austria)	7	MF	1980–1981		31	2	32	2
Erik Jendrišek		(Slovakia)	5	FW	2010		3	0	5	0
Moritz Jenz		(Germany)		DF	2023		11	0	11	0
Jermaine Jones		(United States) (Germany)	32	MF	2007–2013		129	7	185	10
Walter Junghans		(Germany)		GK	1982–1987		148	0	168	0
José Manuel Jurado		(Spain)		MF	2010–2012		46	3	72	9
Yusuf Kabadayı		(Germany)		FW	2023–2024		23	4	24	4
Ozan Kabak		(Turkey)	7	DF	2019–2021		40	3	42	3
Tomáš Kalas		(Czech Republic)		DF	2023–2025		48	2	50	2
Marcin Kamiński		(Poland)		DF	2021–2025		96	7	102	9
Jimmy Kaparos		(Netherlands)		MF	2021, 2024		2	0	2	0
**Kenan Karaman**		(Turkey)		FW	2022–	✓	119	41	127	43
Ali Karimi		(Iran)		MF	2011		1	0	2	0
**Loris Karius**		(Germany)		GK	2025–	✓	44	0	47	0
Günter Karnhof		(Germany)		MF	1963–1965		34	1	37	1
Gerd Kasperski		(Germany)		MF	1968		7	3	7	3
**Nikola Katić**		(Bosnia and Herzegovina)	18	DF	2025–	✓	36	1	40	1
Markus Kaya		(Germany)		MF	1999		1	0	1	0
Thilo Kehrer		(Germany)		DF	2016–2018		45	4	59	4
Levan Kenia		(Georgia (country))	13	MF	2008–2009		11	0	14	1
Jonjoe Kenny		(England)		DF	2019–2020		31	2	34	2
Jan Kirchhoff		(Germany)		DF	2014–2015		16	0	20	0
Hans-Peter Kirchwehm		(Germany)		FW	1967		2	0	3	0
Thomas Kläsener		(Germany)		DF	2003–2006		32	1	49	2
Jürgen Klein		(Germany)		DF	1972–1974		27	0	36	0
Uwe Kleina		(Germany)		DF	1963–1966		19	0	21	0
Gerhard Kleppinger		(Germany)		DF	1984–1987		97	12	106	13
Mario Klinger		(Germany)		MF	2005		0	0	1	0
Michael Klinkert		(Germany)		DF	1987–1989		63	9	69	9
Harald Klose		(Germany)		FW	1963–1968		58	7	63	7
Peer Kluge		(Germany)		MF	2010–2011		38	1	52	1
Denis Klyuyev		(Russia)		MF	1997–1998		24	1	28	1
Sven Kmetsch		(Germany)		MF	1998–2003		88	3	108	5
Levan Kobiashvili		(Georgia (country))	44	MF	2003–2009		168	9	233	17
Stefan Kohn		(Germany)		FW	1995		12	5	13	5
Sead Kolašinac		(Bosnia and Herzegovina)	21	DF	2012–2017, 2021		111	5	141	5
Timothée Kolodziejczak		(France)		DF	2022		1	0	1	0
Fabijan Komljenović		(Croatia)		MF	1994		2	0	2	0
Yevhen Konoplyanka		(Ukraine)	26	MF	2016–2019		57	6	78	13
Thomas Kortmann		(Germany)		MF	1989		3	0	3	0
Roland Kosien		(Germany)		FW	1972		2	0	4	0
Willi Koslowski	✓	(Germany)	3	FW	1963–1965		39	12	46	16
Jarosław Kotas		(Poland)		DF	1988–1990		37	1	41	1
Sōichirō Kōzuki		(Japan)		FW	2023		10	1	11	1
Alex Král		(Czech Republic)	5	MF	2022–2023		29	0	31	0
Bleron Krasniqi		(Kosovo)		FW	2021		1	0	1	0
Willi Kraus		(Germany)		FW	1966–1968		36	16	39	17
Tom Krauß		(Germany)		MF	2022–2023		32	2	33	2
Franz Krauthausen		(Germany)		MF	1973–1975		6	0	6	0
Erwin Kremers	✓	(Germany)	15	FW	1971–1978		212	50	260	54
Helmut Kremers	✓	(Germany)	8	MF	1971–1980		226	45	274	59
Manfred Kreuz	✓	(Germany)		FW	1963–1968		83	17	91	19
Michael Kroninger		(Germany)		MF	1990–1992		33	2	36	2
Mladen Krstajić		(Serbia)	28	DF	2004–2009		131	7	183	9
Thomas Kruse		(Germany)		DF	1978–1988		262	6	285	8
Waldemar Ksienzyk		(Germany)		MF	1994–1995		25	1	31	1
Günter Kuczinski		(Germany)		DF	1972		0	0	1	0
Harald Kügler		(Germany)		MF	1980–1982		45	11	48	11
Timo Kunert		(Germany)		MF	2007		1	0	1	0
Kevin Kurányi		(Germany)	23	FW	2005–2010		162	71	209	87
**Hasan Kuruçay**		(Turkey)		DF	2025–	✓	40	4	44	4
Marco Kurz		(Germany)		DF	1995–1998		58	0	67	0
Ahmed Kutucu		(Turkey)	2	FW	2018–2021		45	5	52	6
Karl-Heinz Kuzmierz		(Germany)		MF	1970		2	0	3	0
Hans-Georg Lambert		(Germany)		FW	1963		1	0	1	0
Fabian Lamotte		(Germany)		DF	2004–2005		10	1	11	1
Thomas Lander		(Germany)		FW	1976–1979		21	3	27	3
Michael Langer		(Austria)		GK	2020–2023		8	0	8	0
Alexander Langlitz		(Germany)		FW	2011		0	0	1	0
Søren Larsen		(Denmark)	8	FW	2005–2008		51	10	73	15
Jordan Larsson		(Sweden)		FW	2022–2023		11	0	12	0
Lennart Larsson		(Sweden)	10	MF	1977–1979		26	3	27	3
**Bryan Lasme**		(France)		FW	2023–	✓	46	6	49	7
Pierre-Michel Lasogga		(Germany)		FW	2025		1	0	1	0
Radoslav Látal		(Czech Republic)	44	MF	1994–2001		187	14	225	14
Danny Latza		(Germany)		MF	2009, 2021–2024		49	3	53	4
Joseph Laumann		(Germany)		FW	2005		1	0	2	0
Dong-gyeong Lee		(South Korea)		MF	2022		1	0	1	0
Thorsten Legat		(Germany)		MF	2000		4	0	4	0
Jens Lehmann		(Germany)	2	GK	1988–1998		274	2	312	2
Uwe Leifeld		(Germany)		FW	1991–1993		30	2	30	2
Dylan Leonard		(Australia)		DF	2026		2	0	2	0
Reinhard Libuda	✓	(Germany)	24	FW	1963–65, 1968–72, 1974		190	20	225	26
Lincoln		(Brazil)		MF	2004–2007		83	20	117	31
Thomas Linke		(Germany)	2	DF	1992–1998		175	13	205	16
**Dejan Ljubičić**		(Austria)		MF	2026–	✓	21	4	23	5
Marius Lode		(Norway)		DF	2022		6	0	6	0
Heinz-Dieter Lömm		(Germany)		MF	1965–1966		5	0	6	0
Werner Lorant		(Germany)		MF	1982–1983		18	0	21	0
Peter Løvenkrands		(Denmark)	7	FW	2006–2008		44	6	61	9
Kilian Ludewig		(Germany)		DF	2020		6	0	8	0
Jürgen Luginger		(Germany)		MF	1988–1994		191	9	204	13
Herbert Lütkebohmert	✓	(Germany)		MF	1968–1979		286	28	351	33
Volodymyr Lyutyi		(Soviet Union)	3	FW	1989–1991		45	9	48	10
Pavel Mačák		(Czechoslovakia)		GK	1984–1987		17	0	18	0
Richard Mademann		(Germany)		DF	1990–1993		52	0	54	1
Mikail Maden		(Norway)		MF	2021		1	0	1	0
Hami Mandıralı		(Turkey)	3	MF	1998–1999		22	3	25	5
Hans-Dieter Mangold		(Germany)		FW	1980		2	0	3	0
Helmut Manns		(Germany)		FW	1971–1973		19	1	32	2
Carsten Marell		(Germany)		MF	1988–1989		17	1	21	1
Enver Marić		(Socialist Federal Republic of Yugoslavia)		GK	1976–1978		47	0	60	0
Ciprian Marica		(Romania)	12	FW	2011–2013		34	5	52	9
Carsten Marquardt		(Germany)		FW	1985–1990		82	10	88	12
Omar Mascarell		(Spain)		MF	2018–2021		61	1	71	1
Aníbal Matellán		(Argentina)		DF	2001–2003		43	1	66	1
Joël Matip		(Cameroon)	27	DF	2009–2016		194	17	258	23
Klaus Matischak		(Germany)		FW	1963–1964		22	18	25	21
Rabbi Matondo		(Wales)	6	FW	2019–2020		30	2	32	2
Henning Matriciani		(Germany)		DF	2021–2025		61	0	64	0
Martin Max		(Germany)		FW	1995–1999		109	33	133	39
Philipp Max		(Germany)		DF	2014		2	0	2	0
Weston McKennie		(United States)	19	MF	2017–2020		75	4	91	5
Caspar Memering		(Germany)		MF	1984–1985		17	1	20	1
Hamza Mendyl		(Morocco)	4	DF	2018–2021		12	0	21	0
Levent Mercan		(Germany)		MF	2019–2021		6	0	7	1
Christoph Metzelder		(Germany)		DF	2010–2013		52	2	74	2
Max Meyer		(Germany)	4	MF	2013–2018		146	17	192	22
Bernd Michel		(Germany)		FW	1968–1969		4	0	5	0
Jörg Mielers		(Germany)		DF	1988–1989		33	0	37	0
Radmilo Mihajlović		(Socialist Federal Republic of Yugoslavia)		FW	1991–1993		58	12	60	12
Yaroslav Mikhaylov		(Russia)		MF	2021–2022		8	0	10	1
Christian Mikolajczak		(Germany)		MF	2000–2001		13	0	13	0
Mineiro		(Brazil)		MF	2009–2010		7	0	7	0
Juan Miranda		(Spain)		DF	2019–2020		11	0	12	0
Manuel Mirbach		(Germany)		MF	1987–1988		6	0	6	0
Tobias Mohr		(Germany)		MF	2022–2025		63	4	69	5
Mike Möllensiep		(Germany)		FW	1997		2	0	2	0
Andreas Möller		(Germany)		MF	2000–2003		86	6	112	11
Florent Mollet		(France)		MF	2022		9	1	11	1
Jan Morávek		(Czech Republic)	2	MF	2009–2011		13	2	20	2
Christoph Moritz		(Germany)		MF	2009–2013		54	1	69	1
Émile Mpenza		(Belgium)	18	FW	2000–2003		79	28	96	33
Horst Mühlmann		(Germany)		GK	1963–1966		42	0	45	0
Youri Mulder		(Netherlands)	9	FW	1993–2002		177	33	202	44
Andreas Müller		(Germany)		MF	1988–2000		286	30	323	32
Joey Müller		(Germany)		DF	2023		1	0	1	0
**Kevin Müller**		(Germany)		GK	2026–	✓	5	0	5	0
Marius Müller		(Germany)		GK	2023–2024		21	0	22	0
Derry Murkin		(England)		DF	2023–2025		54	1	57	1
Shkodran Mustafi		(Germany)		DF	2021		13	1	13	1
Dragan Mutibarić		(Socialist Federal Republic of Yugoslavia)		GK	1975		2	0	3	0
Moussa N'Diaye		(Senegal)		DF	2026		14	0	14	0
Naldo		(Brazil)		DF	2016–2018		60	8	80	9
Matija Nastasić		(Serbia)	12	DF	2015–2021		122	1	157	2
Jiří Němec	✓	(Czech Republic)	64	MF	1993–2002		256	6	307	8
Manuel Neuer		(Germany)	20	GK	2005–2011		156	0	203	0
Gerhard Neuser		(Germany)		MF	1965–1970		143	19	162	25
Roman Neustädter		(Russia) (Germany)	5	MF	2012–2016		122	7	161	8
Alex Nielsen		(Denmark)		MF	1988–1989		15	0	15	0
Norbert Nigbur	✓	(Germany)	6	GK	1966–1976, 1979–1982		393	0	455	0
Žarko Nikolić		(Socialist Federal Republic of Yugoslavia)		DF	1966–1967		11	0	11	0
Hans Nowak		(Germany)	15	DF	1963–1965		47	3	53	5
Alexander Nübel		(Germany)		GK	2016–2020		46	0	53	0
Chinedu Obasi		(Nigeria)		FW	2012–2014		35	4	51	5
Branko Oblak		(Socialist Federal Republic of Yugoslavia)	10	MF	1975–1977		49	5	61	6
Bastian Oczipka		(Germany)		DF	2017–2021		111	1	126	1
Michael Opitz		(Germany)		MF	1980–1988		224	12	246	14
Niels Oude Kamphuis		(Netherlands)	1	MF	1999–2005		134	8	173	9
Assan Ouédraogo		(Germany)		MF	2023–2024		17	3	17	3
Thomas Ouwejan		(Netherlands)		DF	2021–2024		73	5	77	5
Mesut Özil		(Germany)		MF	2006–2007		30	0	39	1
Helmut Pabst		(Germany)		GK	1972–1973		11	0	14	0
Gonçalo Paciência		(Portugal)		FW	2020–2021		15	1	16	1
Victor Pálsson		(Iceland)	3	MF	2021–2022		28	0	30	0
Christian Pander		(Germany)	2	DF	2002–2011		78	5	108	9
Kyriakos Papadopoulos		(Greece)	16	DF	2010–2014		61	3	97	7
Wolfgang Patzke		(Germany)		MF	1986–1988		21	4	22	4
Vasilios Pavlidis		(Greece)		DF	2021		1	0	1	0
Miguel Pereira		(Angola)	11	FW	1993–1995, 1997–1999		16	1	18	1
Sladan Peric		(Denmark)		DF	2000		0	0	1	0
Reinhard Pfeiffer		(Germany)		FW	1971		1	0	1	0
Marvin Pieringer		(Germany)		FW	2021–2022		24	2	26	2
Sérgio Pinto		(Germany)		MF	1999, 2003–2004		23	0	30	1
Hans Pirkner		(Austria)	4	FW	1969–1971		47	8	59	11
Marko Pjaca		(Croatia)	6	FW	2018		7	2	9	2
Felix Platte		(Germany)		FW	2015		3	0	4	0
Nicolas Plestan		(France)		DF	2010		3	0	4	0
Vasileios Pliatsikas		(Greece)	3	MF	2009–2011		9	0	12	0
Heinz Pliska		(Germany)		MF	1965–1968		75	2	80	2
Manfred Pohlschmidt		(Germany)		FW	1967–1971		106	26	125	31
Sebastian Polter		(Germany)		FW	2022–2024		31	5	35	5
Paul Pöpperl		(Germany)		MF	2025		3	0	3	0
**Finn Porath**		(Germany)		MF	2025–	✓	18	1	19	1
Christian Poulsen		(Denmark)	32	MF	2002–2006		111	3	162	6
Michael Prus		(Germany)		DF	1986–1996		220	0	239	2
Teemu Pukki		(Finland)	20	FW	2011–2013		37	8	47	8
Alfred Pyka		(Germany)		MF	1965–1967		58	5	61	5
Marco Quotschalla		(Germany)		FW	2010		0	0	1	0
Raffael		(Brazil)		MF	2013		16	2	16	2
Rafinha		(Brazil)	1	DF	2005–2010		153	7	198	10
Baba Rahman		(Ghana)	6	DF	2016, 2018		16	0	26	1
Ivan Rakitić		(Croatia)	32	MF	2007–2011		97	12	135	16
Benito Raman		(Belgium)	1	FW	2019–2021		50	6	55	12
Reinhold Ranftl		(Austria)		MF	2021–2022		15	0	16	0
Raúl	✓	(Spain)		FW	2010–2012		66	28	98	40
Friedel Rausch		(Germany)		DF	1963–1971		170	6	194	6
Oliver Reck		(Germany)		GK	1998–2002		112	1	132	1
Fabian Reese		(Germany)		FW	2015–2017, 2019		13	0	16	0
Ralf Regenbogen		(Germany)		FW	1985–1986, 1997		30	3	33	4
Tore Reginiussen		(Norway)		DF	2010		1	0	1	0
Peter Remmert		(Germany)		FW	2025		5	0	6	0
Sascha Riether		(Germany)		DF	2015–2019		23	0	30	0
Manfred Ritschel		(Germany)		MF	1977–1978		22	0	26	0
Darío Rodríguez		(Uruguay)	27	DF	2002–2007		102	6	142	9
Frederik Rønnow		(Denmark)	1	GK	2020–2021		11	0	11	0
Frank Rost		(Germany)	3	GK	2002–2006		130	0	196	0
Dietmar Roth		(Germany)		DF	1985–1987		50	0	55	0
Sebastian Rudy		(Germany)	1	MF	2018–2020		23	0	30	0
Rolf Rüssmann	✓	(Germany)	20	DF	1969–1980		304	30	375	46
Werner Ruthmann		(Germany)		DF	1989–1991		7	0	9	0
Marc Rzatkowski		(Germany)		MF	2021–2022		2	0	2	0
Alban Sabah		(Togo)		DF	2011		0	0	1	0
Sidney Sam		(Germany)		MF	2014–2016		13	0	22	0
Felipe Sánchez		(Argentina)		DF	2024–2026		30	0	34	0
Vicente Sánchez		(Uruguay)	5	FW	2008–2010		50	3	60	4
Ebbe Sand	✓	(Denmark)	51	FW	1999–2006		214	73	282	104
Peter Sandhofe		(Germany)		GK	1979–1980		30	0	31	0
Andreas Sandt		(Germany)		GK	1981		1	0	1	0
Leroy Sané		(Germany)	4	FW	2014–2016		47	11	57	13
Salif Sané		(Senegal)	13	DF	2018–2022		70	4	82	6
Sidi Sané		(Germany)		FW	2022		1	0	2	0
Felipe Santana		(Brazil)		DF	2013–2014		24	1	32	1
Hans Sarpei		(Ghana)	2	DF	2010–2011		9	0	18	0
Dietmar Schacht		(Germany)		DF	1989–1991		67	7	70	7
**Ron Schallenberg**		(Germany)		MF	2023–	✓	93	3	98	3
Dieter Schatzschneider		(Germany)		FW	1984–1986		47	10	53	11
Klaus Scheer		(Germany)		MF	1969–1975		165	38	203	48
Uwe Scherr		(Germany)		MF	1992–1996		82	2	91	4
Mark Schierenberg		(Germany)		MF	1992–1995, 1997–1999		17	0	20	0
Mathias Schipper		(Germany)		DF	1976–1979, 1982–1988		221	7	258	10
Günter Schlipper		(Germany)		MF	1989–1992		111	15	118	16
Tim Schmidt		(Germany)		DF	2024		0	0	1	0
Lukas Schmitz		(Germany)		DF	2009–2011		52	2	70	2
Mathias Schober		(Germany)		GK	1997–1999, 2008–2012		30	0	39	0
Frank Schön		(Germany)		DF	1995–1996		12	0	13	0
Rudolf Schonhoff		(Germany)		FW	1975–1976		2	0	2	0
Alessandro Schöpf		(Austria)	28	MF	2016–2021		112	10	143	16
Ulrich Schröder		(Germany)		FW	1980–1981		2	0	2	0
Günther Schubert		(Germany)		GK	1976		3	0	4	0
Markus Schubert		(Germany)		GK	2019–2020		9	0	10	0
Luca Schuler		(Germany)		FW	2020–2021		2	0	2	0
Willi Schulz		(Germany)	22	DF	1963–1965		52	2	57	2
Toni Schumacher		(Germany)		GK	1987–1988		33	0	34	0
Friedhelm Schütte		(Germany)		DF	1976		4	0	6	1
Markus Schwiderowski		(Germany)		DF	1992		4	0	4	0
Alexander Schwolow		(Germany)		GK	2022–2023		23	0	25	0
Paul Seguin		(Germany)		MF	2023–2025		55	5	57	6
Jochen Seitz		(Germany)		MF	2003–2004		18	2	25	2
Peter Sendscheid		(Germany)		FW	1989–1994		149	46	155	46
Klaus Senger		(Germany)		DF	1966–1971		102	3	113	3
Suat Serdar		(Germany)	4	MF	2018–2021		71	10	83	11
Thomas Siewert		(Germany)		DF	1980–1982		30	1	30	1
Tim Skarke		(Germany)		FW	2023		9	1	9	1
Michael Skibbe		(Germany)		FW	1984–1986		15	1	16	1
Steven Skrzybski		(Germany)		FW	2018–2021		25	3	32	4
Waldemar Słomiany		(Poland)		DF	1967–1970		52	5	62	6
Jürgen Sobieray		(Germany)		DF	1969–1979		210	14	239	17
Brandon Soppy		(France)		DF	2024		5	0	5	0
Martin Spanring		(Germany)		DF	1992		8	0	8	0
Benjamin Stambouli		(France)		DF	2016–2021		105	0	133	0
Peter Stichler		(Germany)		DF	1981–1985		69	6	79	7
Albert Streit		(Germany)		MF	2008		14	0	15	0
Wim Suurbier		(Netherlands)	7	DF	1977–1978		12	0	15	0
**Moussa Sylla**		(Mali)	4	FW	2024–	✓	62	23	66	24
Ádám Szalai		(Hungary)	3	FW	2013–2014		28	7	40	9
Krisztián Szollár		(Hungary)		DF	2000		1	0	1	0
Detlev Szymanek		(Germany)		FW	1980–1982		19	2	20	2
Malik Talabidi		(Germany)		DF	2025		1	0	1	0
**Satoshi Tanaka**		(Japan)	2	MF	2026–	✓	9	0	11	0
Filip Tapalović		(Croatia)		MF	1998–1999		18	0	20	0
Jürgen Täuber		(Germany)		DF	1981		17	1	17	1
Klaus Täuber		(Germany)		FW	1983–1987		125	58	138	64
Stephan Täuber		(Germany)		MF	1986–1987		8	0	8	0
Niklas Tauer		(Germany)		MF	2023		1	0	2	0
Zaid Tchibara		(Togo)		FW	2025–2026		3	0	3	0
Bernard Tekpetey		(Ghana)	2	FW	2016–2017		2	0	3	0
Lino Tempelmann		(Germany)		MF	2023–2024		27	1	28	1
Simon Terodde		(Germany)		FW	2021–2024		90	40	95	40
Cedric Teuchert		(Germany)		FW	2018–2019		9	0	15	0
Malick Thiaw		(Germany)		DF	2020–2022		57	3	61	3
Bernd Thiele		(Germany)		DF	1973–1982		189	6	215	6
Olaf Thon	✓	(Germany)	40	DF	1983–1988, 1994–2002		333	66	384	75
George Timotheou		(Australia)		DF	2019		1	0	1	0
Jean-Clair Todibo		(France)		DF	2020		8	0	10	0
Michael Tönnies		(Germany)		FW	1978–1980		7	0	9	0
Keke Topp		(Germany)		FW	2021–2024		27	5	27	5
Gyula Tóth		(Hungary)		GK	1964–1965		21	0	25	0
Tidiane Touré		(France)		DF	2025		1	0	1	0
Filip Trojan		(Czech Republic)		FW	2002–2004		11	0	21	3
Uwe Tschiskale		(Germany)		FW	1988		16	4	16	4
İlyas Tüfekçi		(Turkey)	1	FW	1981–1983		62	15	68	16
Atsuto Uchida		(Japan)	43	DF	2010–2016		104	1	153	2
Volkan Ünlü		(Turkey)		GK	2004		4	0	4	0
Lars Unnerstall		(Germany)		GK	2011–2012		34	0	47	0
Jere Uronen		(Finland)	2	DF	2023		11	0	11	0
Mark Uth		(Germany)	1	FW	2018–2021		48	5	59	7
Sepp van den Berg		(Netherlands)		DF	2022–2023		9	1	9	1
Ulrich van den Berg		(Germany)		DF	1972–1976		60	4	77	6
Steven van der Sloot		(Netherlands)		DF	2024		7	0	7	0
Heinz van Haaren		(Netherlands)		MF	1968–1972		126	10	154	16
Marco van Hoogdalem		(Netherlands)		DF	1997–2003		151	10	193	14
Nico Van Kerckhoven		(Belgium)	26	DF	1998–2004		134	5	164	6
Gustavo Varela		(Uruguay)	13	MF	2002–2008		82	8	118	12
Sven Vermant		(Belgium)	11	MF	2001–2005		98	6	138	7
Andreas Vindheim		(Norway)		DF	2022		7	1	7	1
Werner Vollack		(Germany)		GK	1988–1990		36	0	39	0
**Luca Vozar**		(Germany)		MF	2026–	✓	1	0	2	0
David Wagner		(United States)	6	FW	1995–1997		29	2	36	3
Friedrich Wagner		(Germany)		DF	1978–1979		28	1	30	1
Hans-Joachim Wagner		(Germany)		DF	1972		0	0	2	0
Tomasz Wałdoch	✓	(Poland)	23	DF	1999–2006		141	12	184	13
Mika Wallentowitz		(Germany)		MF	2025–2026		13	0	13	0
Martin Wasinski		(Belgium)		DF	2024		1	0	3	0
Uwe Wassmer		(Germany)		FW	1988–1989		35	10	40	14
Jürgen Wegmann		(Germany)		FW	1986–1987		28	10	28	10
Uwe Weidemann		(Germany)		MF	1995–1996		19	1	26	3
Werner Weikamp		(Germany)		FW	1965–1966		5	0	5	0
Timon Wellenreuther		(Germany)		GK	2015		8	0	10	0
Jürgen Welp		(Germany)		GK	1990–1991		6	0	8	0
Siegfried Werner		(Germany)		FW	1965–1966		9	1	9	1
Heiko Westermann		(Germany)	19	DF	2007–2010		92	12	123	18
Andreas Wiegel		(Germany)		FW	2011		0	0	1	1
Andreas Wildoer		(Germany)		MF	1989		1	0	1	0
William		(Brazil)		DF	2021		8	0	9	0
Marc Wilmots	✓	(Belgium)	38	MF	1996–2003		138	27	178	38
Ludger Winkel		(Germany)		MF	1981		3	0	4	0
Hans-Jürgen Wittkamp		(Germany)		MF	1967–1971		101	30	122	37
**Maximilian Wöber**		(Austria)	3	DF	2026–	✓	6	1	6	1
Sascha Wolf		(Germany)		FW	1998–1999		14	3	14	3
Claus-Dieter Wollitz		(Germany)		MF	1987–1988		29	3	30	3
Michael Wollitz		(Germany)		DF	1987–1989		33	3	38	3
Thorsten Wörsdörfer		(Germany)		MF	1990–1991		12	1	12	1
Dries Wouters		(Belgium)		DF	2021		2	0	3	0
Haji Wright		(United States)		FW	2018–2019		7	1	7	1
Alban Wüst		(Germany)		FW	1969–1971		32	4	40	5
Wolfram Wuttke		(Germany)		MF	1979–1980, 1982–1983		48	10	57	10
Maya Yoshida		(Japan)	7	DF	2022–2023		29	0	31	0
Amin Younes		(Germany)		MF	2024–2026		30	2	31	2
Mauro Zalazar		(Uruguay)		MF	2024–2025		1	0	2	0
Rodrigo Zalazar		(Uruguay)	1	MF	2021–2023		52	7	55	9
Carlos Zambrano		(Peru)	11	DF	2009–2010		16	0	20	1
Zé Roberto		(Brazil)		MF	2008		3	1	3	1
Thomas Zechel		(Germany)		MF	1990–1991		20	1	22	1

=== Pre-Bundesliga era ===
Notable players for Schalke 04 before 1963 are listed below.

H Member of the Schalke 04 Hall of Fame ("Ehrenkabine") – 12 players
C Played for the Germany national team in their Schalke 04 career (C = international caps as a Schalke player) – 16 players

German championship participations: (titles in bold):
1927, 1928, 1929, 1930, 1932, 1933, 1934, 1935, 1936, 1937, 1938, 1939, 1940, 1941, 1942, 1943, 1944, 1951, 1952, 1956, 1958, 1962

Total competitive matches (since 1922): Oberliga West (468), Gauliga Westfalen (206), Gauliga Ruhr (141), German championship (116), DFB-Pokal (53), Western German championship (43), Westphalian / Western German Cup (41), Emscher-Kreisliga (39), Landesliga Westfalen (34), European Cup (7), Bundesliga, i.a.

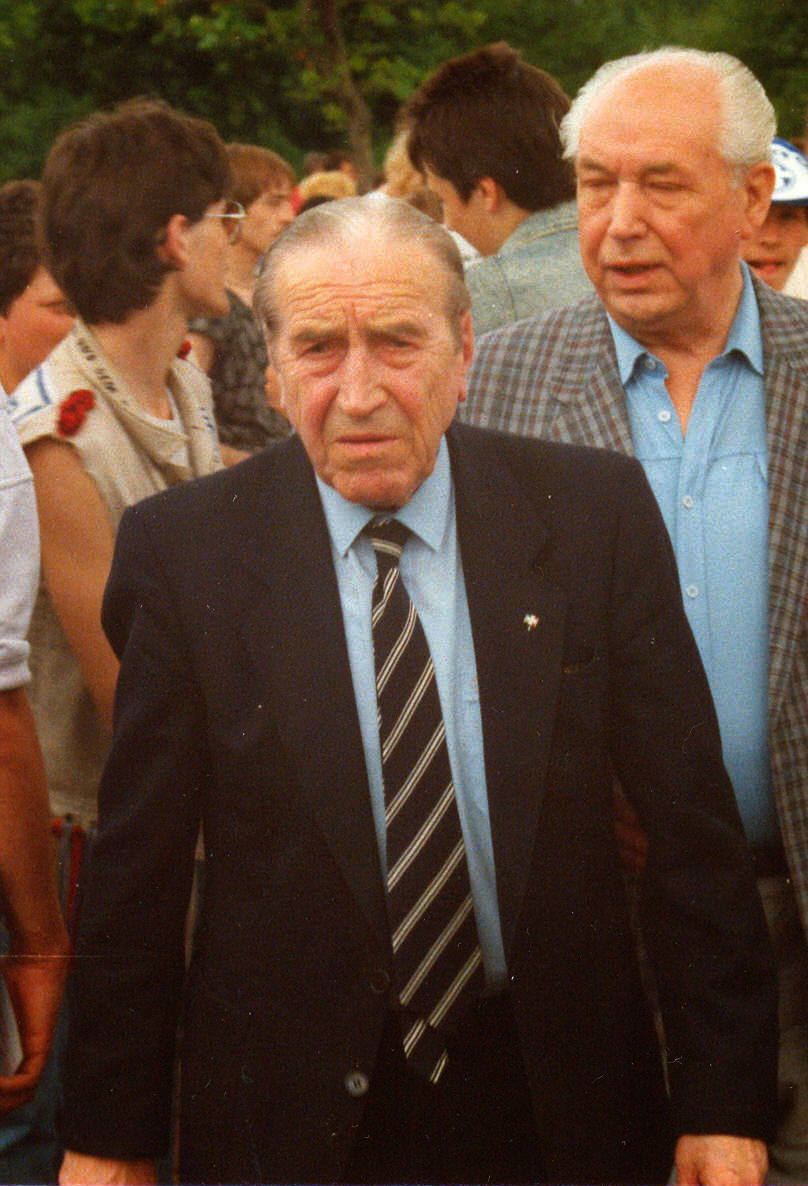
Ernst Kuzorra won six German championships with Schalke 04 between 1923 and 1949.

Player	H	C	Pos.	Club career	Championship			Total	
Player	H	C	Pos.	Club career	Apps	Goals	Won	Apps	Goals
Walter Berg		1	MF	1936–1942	27	5	2	86	26
Hans Bornemann			DF	1932–1948	68	1	6	220	1
Herbert Burdenski		3	MF	1940–1942, 1947–1949	15	7	2	119	93
Willi Dargaschewski			MF	1939–1952	10	2	1	199	13
Hermann Eppenhoff	✓	3	FW	1939–1944, 1949–1955	39	26	3	277	146
Rudolf Gellesch		20	MF	1933–1944	52	11	6	190	38
Wilhelm Gies	✓		MF	1904–1914	0	0	0	0	0
Heinz Hinz			FW	1938–1947	28	4	3	172	78
Ernst Kalwitzki	✓		FW	1933–1944	66	54	6	253	195
Günter Karnhof			MF	1955–1965	8	0	1	202	2
Bernhard Klodt	✓	19	FW	1943–1948, 1950–1962	24	10	1	425	168
Hans Klodt		17	GK	1937–1947	44	0	4	199	5
Heinz Kördell		1	MF	1956–1962	4	3	1	126	29
Willi Koslowski	✓	3	FW	1955–1965	8	5	1	265	88
Manfred Kreuz	✓		FW	1956–1968	7	4	1	256	77
Ernst Kuzorra	✓	12	FW	1923–1949	79	48	6	466	445
Paul Matzkowski			FW	1948–1957	19	2	1	241	66
Hermann Mellage			GK	1930–1937	31	0	3	146	0
Hermann Nattkämper			MF	1930–1936	30	10	2	128	90
Hans Nowak		15	DF	1958–1965	4	0	0	174	39
Manfred Orzessek			GK	1953–1961	11	0	1	198	0
Ernst Poertgen	✓	3	FW	1934–1938	24	28	2	101	104
Valentin Przybylski			MF	1927–1937	33	0	3	160	5
Emil Rothardt			MF	1924–1935	23	14	2	166	102
Willi Schulz		22	DF	1960–1965	4	0	0	152	9
Otto Schweisfurth			DF	1934–1948	48	0	4	241	9
Günter Siebert			FW	1951–1953, 1955–1959	11	4	1	140	70
Thomas Student	✓		DF	1916–1928, 1930–1931	1	0	0	27	0
Fritz Szepan	✓	34	FW	1925–1949	87	56	6	437	311
Hans Tibulski		1	FW	1929–1933	5	3	0	40	24
Otto Tibulski	✓	2	DF	1932–1948	77	7	6	349	61
Adolf Urban	✓	21	FW	1932–1943	46	30	6	153	124
Walter Zwickhofer			MF	1942–1943, 1949–1956	13	0	1	218	16

== Captains ==
Honorary captain

Player	Nat.	Years
Thomas Student	(Germany)	1916–1928
Ernst Kuzorra	(Germany)	1928–1948
Otto Tibulski	(Germany)	1948
Hermann Eppenhoff	(Germany)	1949–1955
Bernhard Klodt	(Germany)	1955–1962
Manfred Kreuz	(Germany)	1962–1968
Heinz Pliska	(Germany)	1968–1969
Reinhard Libuda	(Germany)	1969–1972
Helmut Kremers	(Germany)	1972–1976
Klaus Fischer	(Germany)	1976–1980
Bernd Thiele	(Germany)	1980–1981
Klaus Fischer	(Germany)	1981
Norbert Janzon	(Germany)	1981–1983
Manfred Drexler	(Germany)	1983–1985
Bernard Dietz	(Germany)	1985–1986
Walter Junghans	(Germany)	1986–1987
Wilfried Hannes	(Germany)	1987–1988
Andreas Müller	(Germany)	1988–1992
Günter Güttler	(Germany)	1992–1993
Holger Gehrke	(Germany)	1993–1994
Andreas Müller	(Germany)	1994–1995
Olaf Thon	(Germany)	1995–1996
Jens Lehmann	(Germany)	1996–1997
Olaf Thon	(Germany)	1997–2000
Tomasz Wałdoch	(Poland)	2000–2004
Frank Rost	(Germany)	2004–2005
Ebbe Sand	(Denmark)	2005–2006
Marcelo Bordon	(Brazil)	2006–2009
Mladen Krstajić	(Serbia)	2009
Heiko Westermann	(Germany)	2009–2010
Manuel Neuer	(Germany)	2010–2011
Benedikt Höwedes	(Germany)	2011–2017
Ralf Fährmann	(Germany)	2017–2019
Alexander Nübel	(Germany)	2019
Omar Mascarell	(Spain)	2020–2021
Sead Kolašinac	(Bosnia and Herzegovina)	2021
Danny Latza	(Germany)	2021–2023
Simon Terodde	(Germany)	2023–2024
Kenan Karaman	(Turkey)	2024–

== See also ==
- List of FC Schalke 04 records and statistics

== Sources ==
- Königsblau: Die Geschichte des FC Schalke 04. Die Werkstatt. 2015. ISBN 978-3-7307-0204-8.
- "FC Schalke 04 » Players from A-Z". worldfootball.net.
