= Sandt =

Sandt is a surname. Notable people with this surname include:

- Andreas Sandt (born 1962), German footballer
- Lewis Earle Sandt (1888–1913), American aviation pioneer
- Nina Sandt (1928–2003), German actress
- Patty Kazmaier-Sandt (1962–1990), American ice hockey player
- Tommy Sandt (1950–2020), American baseball player
- Wolfgang Sandt (born 1960), German sculptor and author

== See also ==
- Van der Sandt
