= MyFootballClub =

English football society

- Own the club, pick the team!
- Website type: Industrial and Provident Society and Internet forum
- Available in: English
- Owners: MyFootballClub Society, Ltd.
- Creator: Will Brooks
- Website: www.myfootballclub.co.uk
- Registration: Yes
- Launched: 26 April 2007; 19 years ago

MyFootballClub was an English Industrial and Provident Society that sought, starting in August 2007, to recruit at least 50,000 football enthusiasts from across the world to purchase an English association football club. MyFootballClub's premise is to allow its paid members to control the club through a democratic voting process conducted over the internet. Member voting includes matters both on the pitch, such as team selection and player transfers, and off the field, like what type of food to serve at the stadium.

From 2008 to 2013, MyFootballClub owned 75% of Ebbsfleet United F.C. With its purchase of a majority share of Ebbsfleet United, MyFootballClub became the first online community to fully run a professional sports club in history.

The society was closed in 2023.

== Background ==
MyFC was engineered by former football journalist Will Brooks. Brooks initially estimated MyFC's purchase fund at £1,375,000 if 50,000 people were to sign up as members. All members have voting rights on certain decisions in the club purchased by MyFC and they will collectively manage that club, by making many of the decisions usually made by the manager and others, through a voting system on the MyFootballClub website. However, they do not actually hold any shares. The watershed figure of 50,000 registrations expressing interest in participation was passed on 31 July 2007, with a total of 53,051 registrations completed at that time. At that point, MyFC began collecting payments from those who had registered as well as any new people who signed up subsequently, opening what MyFootballClub described as "phase 2". Paid-up members would participate in a non-binding vote on takeover preference, with Leeds United initially leading the member voting, followed by Cambridge United and Nottingham Forest.

Brooks had said that the club purchased would likely be playing in Football League Two or the Conference National, and MyFootballClub's managers had opened talks with a number of clubs from those leagues. Negotiations between MyFC and various football clubs remained secret during this period due to the confidential nature of the purchase discussions and because of the number of different clubs involved. Also around this time, EA Sports, the sports simulation video games division of Electronic Arts, agreed to a deal with MyFootballClub that "will be supporting us with a significant investment" to boost the group's football club purchasing fund.

On 6 August 2007 it was revealed that four clubs had approached MyFootballClub about the possibility of a sale. Shortly thereafter, The Independent reported that MyFootballClub had raised approximately £500,000 in the first 20 days it had been collecting funds from members to purchase a football club. On 3 September 2007 it was reported that Halifax Town had approached MyFootballClub in an attempt to save the football club from a winding-up order over unpaid taxes. In May 2008, it became public that the other two clubs besides Ebbsfleet United that MyFC had come closest to purchasing were League Two's Mansfield Town and Leigh RMI, then of the Conference North.

== Ebbsfleet United ==
On 13 November 2007, MyFootballClub announced that it had agreed in principle to purchase Conference National club Ebbsfleet United, which had been known as Gravesend & Northfleet F.C. until early in 2007. Ebbsfleet United was chosen out of the nine football clubs that approached MyFC about a possible purchase. A process of due diligence was entered into, with "lawyers and the accountants...looking through the books and the accounts to make sure there are no skeletons in the cupboards."

=== Takeover ===
On 16 January 2008, MyFootballClub publicly announced the terms of its proposed purchase of Ebbsfleet United and put the terms of the sale to a vote of its members. MyFC members had seven days to register their opinion on the club's £635,000 takeover. For the sale to be finalised, 50% of the votes cast had to be in favour, with no quorum required. 18,112 MyFootballClub members voted on the takeover, with 95.89% (17,368 members) in favour of purchasing a controlling stake in Ebbsfleet United.

Ebbsfleet United manager at the time Liam Daish voiced his support for the deal soon after it was publicly announced. Speaking on the official Ebbsfleet United website, Daish said:

"Everyone has worked wonders to get this club into the top half of the Conference. We all agree the club needs something extra to take it to the next step. As a football fan, I think the MyFootballClub idea is fantastic. And as the coach, I look forward to the challenge of working with thousands of members to produce a winning team. Alan Kimble and myself are 100% committed to making this work."

Opinions on the proposed deal were mixed, as Daish's view was echoed by some football fans, but others, including some people currently involved with the sport, were less sanguine about MyFootballClub's involvement with Ebbsfleet United. Even some football insiders were positive about MyFC's proposed purchase of Ebbsfleet, however, including a representative of Brentford, who told CNN that the deal was "a very positive move for football because the club is owned by people who have real passion for it."

=== Decision-making ===
Following the approval of the purchase of Ebbsfleet United by the members of MyFC in January 2008, the leadership of MyFootballClub stated that its members would be able to make decisions affecting the club in future, including picking the starting lineup for matches, but a later members' vote resulted in a decision to leave selection issues to head coach Liam Daish. Ebbsfleet United's first trip to Wembley Stadium, and victory in the 2008 FA Trophy added to the publicity for the project, but questions about an internet society owning a football club remained.

In August 2008, members of MyFootballClub were presented with the type of choice usually reserved for small board of directors: whether to approve a transfer of a player to another club. Ebbsfleet received a £140,000 offer from an unnamed club for forward John Akinde, and as the members of MyFC are the legal owners of the Fleet, they voted on whether to accept that offer. Shortly after the vote for members was publicly announced, it was reported that Championship side Bristol City had made the offer for Akinde. On 29 August 2008, MyFC members approved Akinde's transfer by more than an 82% majority.

Over time, fewer decisions were put to members, and of less impact at the club.

=== Membership decline ===
Even as early as September 2008, commentators noted that participation in votes on the MyFC website had decreased since the initial takeover decision, raising concerns about the ability of MyFootballClub to cover the continued losses at the club.

It was reported in November 2009 that an estimated 23,000 members that had originally signed up prior to the takeover of Ebbsfleet F.C. no longer visited the site, nor contributed towards memberships, leaving around 9,000 active members.

By February 2010, the time of the next renewal date for the bulk of the members, it emerged that the renewal rate had fallen to 20% leaving around 5000 members.

In the close season prior to the 2012–13 season, the MyFootballClub Society membership stood at roughly 1300. A significant drop from the 32,000 peak, but the community remained active in supporting the club both financially and in terms of time. An example of this continued contribution to the club was in June 2012, where the society paid for a new piece of important equipment for the groundsman Peter Norton.

Even with the £150,000 realised from the Akinde transfer, plus possible add-on fees, Ebbsfleet faced estimated annual losses of approximately £800,000, and their financial situation remained precarious notwithstanding the investment of funds from MyFC. As well as suffering a decline in membership, relations between MyFootballClub and the club had deteriorated by November 2012.

=== Handover ===
By the beginning of 2013, MyFootballClub were considering options for relinquishing their shareholding in the club. In April, with the threat of administration, a takeover bid by Spain-based Carlos Kabir Karani was considered and approved in principle by both the Fleet Trust and MyFootballClub. Kevin Rye of Supporters Direct was highly dismissive of the bid, claiming it was "back-of-a-fag-packet stuff", and critical of both MyFootballClub and the Fleet Trust:

"To hear a supporter say MyFootballClub are preventing investment from someone shows the desperation people are in and exposes the way that club is being run, which is not in a sustainable way. They have got to get a grip of that business rather than run after a guy who is promising four-year contracts and saying it's okay. It is one of the worst proposals I have ever seen put to anyone."

After Karani's bid stalled, MyFootballClub voted to hand over control to the supporter's trust but this still would have left a shortfall of £100,000 in order to avoid administration.

A subsequent takeover bid from KEH Sports Limited, a Kuwaiti-based consortium, offered to clear the urgent debts and set a £100,000 transfer budget for the 2013–14 season, as well as committing to construction of a new stand at Stonebridge Road. This was approved by MyFootballClub members vote as well as the Fleet Trust and completed by the end of May.

=== Performance ===
During MyFootballClub's control Ebbsfleet was relegated to the Conference South in 2009-10 but was promoted back to the national level at the first time of asking in the 2010–11 and in the 2011–12 season finished a respectable 14th.

Ebbsfleet won the FA Trophy for the first time in the club's history in May 2008, months after the MyFootballClub takeover, with the club's support at Wembley apparently boosted to 25,000 by new fans.

By the time MyFootballClub members voted to sell the club in early 2013, membership numbers had dropped to 1,000 and fans were protesting against its continued involvement as the club stood on the verge of administration.

== Post-Ebbsfleet ==
MyFootballClub received a "modest sum" from the sale of Ebbsfleet United, and in May 2013 were considering options for the Society, including sponsorship of a club or partial ownership.

== Slough Town ==
Following the sale of Ebbsfleet United, MyFootballClub were approached by a number of football clubs that were seeking a sponsorship agreement. The teams that were considered by the members were Slough Town, Leamington, Cleethorpes Town, Chichester City, Southam United and South Park. Following a number of votes, Slough Town were selected as the team that MyFootballClub would sponsor.

In July 2013, a two year sponsorship deal was entered into with Slough Town. MyFootballClub agreed to have their name as sponsors on the front of the Slough Town away strip, and on the back of the Slough Town home strip. In addition, members are receiving monthly updates from the joint managers and chairman of Slough Town, as well as video highlights of Slough Town's games. MyFootballclub continued their involvement with Slough Town in season 2015–16 as they renewed their sponsorship of the away shirt.

== Membership and worldwide reach ==
MyFootballClub members came from over 70 countries. One of the regions in which MyFootballClub was most popular was Scandinavia, and by the end of October 2007, MyFC had 380 paying members from Norway, 280 from Sweden, 97 from Finland, and 88 from Denmark. By January 2008, over 1,500 Americans had become paid members of MyFootballClub.

Additionally, non-English members of MyFC began to attend matches of Ebbsfleet United. For example, on 5 January 2008, at Ebbsfleet's home match against Weymouth, MyFC members that hailed from Berlin, Copenhagen, and Florida were in attendance.

Media outlets from all over the world have also showed interest in the project, including news organizations from Australia, Chile, Germany, India, Italy, Sweden, the United States, and Vietnam.

By 14 May 2008, paid-up membership in MyFC reached 30,000 people. The 31,000th paid-up member joined on 11 September 2008.

The first renewal date for most members was 19 February 2009. By 23 February total membership stood at slightly less than 9,500. By March 2010, the membership total had fallen to around 4,000 and by March 2013, the membership had dropped below 1000 members

== Similar projects ==
Projects that are similar to MyFootballClub exist in both England and in at least 11 other countries.

The ownership of the semi-professional English football club Biggleswade United inaugurated myBUFC in September 2007, which aims to put the management of that club in the hands of paid-up members, both on and off the field, in a way similar to MyFootballClub.

The People's Club was launched in October 2007 and is a similar scheme looking to allow fans to acquire and run a lower-level English football club.

Ownaclub.com, a comparable project founded in 2009, has a similar objective with the key difference being that rather than requiring fans to pay an annual subscription, a one-off payment secures a permanent share of any acquired club.

One of the latest projects in the UK is Mydalefc, planning to start a new Woking based football club on level 10 of the English football league system, the project starting March 2013 asks fans to contribute £20 allowing them to help make decisions about the club ahead of its registering with the Surrey County Football Association, planned to happen between late 2014 and early 2015. The fans are planned to own at least a 20% share in the club, Mydalefc plans to have 500 to 1000 payments, giving the club £10,000 to £20,000 from fan payments only.

Another UK-based project is Fivepoundfootballclub, an active community which aims to take charge of a lower league club in the UK, excluding England due to the higher cost required for success in that country. Members are required to donate £5 to the investment fund on joining. As of June 2011, this community had drawn up a shortlist for investment consisting of four clubs in the Welsh League system.

Projects outside the UK include:

- India: TRAVANCORE ROYAL SPORTS SOCIETY in India is behind India's first fan owned football club Travancore Royals, TRAVANCORE ROYALS was officially inaugurated on 28 November 2018 and is based in Trivandrum, Kerala, India. Sports and Management Research Institute (SMRI) are the promoters of fans owned football clubs in Asia.
- Brazil: MTDF, or "Meu Time de Futebol," was launched in January 2008 with the aim of acquiring a club in the second tier of Brazilian football by the end of 2008.
- Denmark: Mitsuperligahold, which was launched in August 2007 with the aim of acquiring a club in the second tier of professional Danish football, the First Division.
- France: Web F.C. allows its members, called "entraînautes," to vote on strategic and tactical decisions relating to a lower-level French club in the Ligue de Basse-Normandie through a website. Unlike MyFootballClub's members, members of Web F.C. do not have to pay a fee to participate in the decision-making, but the more they participate, the more value his or her vote is accorded.
  - The founder of Web F.C., Frédéric Gauquelin, later set up United Managers. 2,000 subscribers manage Avant-Garde Caennaise in the 6th Tier of the French football league system#Regional leagues of the French football league system.
- Germany: Deinfussballclub.de was launched in April 2008 with the aim of acquiring 49% of SC Fortuna Köln; a club that plays in the German Oberliga Nordrhein-Westfalen, a lower-level professional league. deinclub.tc-freisenbruch by TC Freisenbruch, a club which was founded in Essen in 1902 and is managed completely by the fans. The team currently plays in the ninth division of the German football league. Since July 2016, the club is managed via a webpage, where the fans can make their decisions about, for example, the starting line-up or the prices for the jersey. For a small amount of money once a month, the fans become "team managers" (not members of TC Freisenbruch) on this webpage and are a part of Germany's most exciting football project. They get exclusive information about the team, video and photo material and of course also data from performance tests or training sessions. It is also the decision of the fans to dismiss the manager of the club. At the moment, the team is trained by Mike Möllensiep.
- Israel: Web2Sport currently operates Hapoel Kiryat Shalom, a Tel Aviv club that plays in Liga Gimel, the sixth tier of Israeli football. Web2Sport allows voting on numerous club functions, including the composition of the club's starting lineup.
- Italy: Squadramia, which was started in January 2008, is an online community that seeks 20,000 members to buy an Italian football club. In late 2008 the web community purchased Santarcangelo Calcio 1926 a team in the Italian Serie D, the fifth tier of the Italian football system.
- Japan: Fujieda MYFC is a team funded by online subscribers and currently play in the J2 League. The team which is based in Fujieda, Shizuoka, is the first of its kind in Japan.
- Poland: KupimyKlub.pl is a Polish project, was launched in May 2008. The purchase of the club is planned for season 2008/09 in the Polish league.
- Romania: Clubulmeudefotbal started on 7 July 2007 as an online community that seeks 50,000 members that are willing to pay an annual membership fee of 50 Euros and aims to buy a Romanian football club.
- Russia: MyFootballClub.ru has a proposed start date of 2007-12-10, but is not affiliated with MyFC.
- Spain: miclubdefutbol.com proposes to raise funds and buy a Spanish lower league club, as does Mi Equipo Favorito, which was launched in January 2008 with the aim of acquiring a club in a Spanish league.
- United States: In 2007, two efforts to crowd-own a team were underway, but have since become dormant: MySoccerClubUSA, which would have allowed fans who pay a fee to join a website which will start a club from scratch to play in either the United Soccer Leagues (USL) or the National Premier Soccer League (NPSL), and SaveTheVictory.org, which attempted to raise enough money to purchase the now-defunct San Francisco-based USL club, California Victory.

== See also ==
- Crowdsourcing
- Tuangou
- Wisdom of Crowds
