= Pliska (disambiguation) =

Pliska was the first capital of the First Bulgarian Empire during the Middle Ages and is now a small town in Shumen Province, Bulgaria.

It is also a surname. It may refer to:

== People ==
- Almir Pliska (born 1987), Bosnian-Herzegovinian footballer
- Fritz Pliska (1915–1995), German footballer
- Heinz Pliska (born 1941), German footballer

== Others ==
- Battle of Pliska or Battle of Vărbitsa Pass, a series of battles between troops, gathered from all parts of the Byzantine Empire, led by the Emperor Nicephorus I, and the First Bulgarian Empire, governed by Khan Krum
- Pliska Ridge, three-peaked ridge in eastern Livingston Island in the South Shetland Islands, Antarctica
- Pliska rosette, a 7th-9th century seven-pointed bronze rosette found in Pliska, the medieval capital of Bulgaria

== See also ==
- Plishka, people named Plishka
