= 1982–83 Bundesliga =

20th season of the Bundesliga

Bundesliga
- Season: 1982–83
- Dates: 17 August 1982 – 4 June 1983
- Champions: Hamburger SV; 3rd Bundesliga title 6th German title
- Relegated: FC Schalke 04; Karlsruher SC; Hertha BSC Berlin
- European Cup: Hamburger SV
- Cup Winners' Cup: 1. FC Köln
- UEFA Cup: SV Werder Bremen; VfB Stuttgart; FC Bayern Munich; 1. FC Kaiserslautern
- Goals: 1,020
- Average goals/game: 3.33
- Top goalscorer: Rudi Völler (23)
- Biggest home win: Dortmund 11–1 Bielefeld (6 November 1982)
- Biggest away win: Düsseldorf 0–6 Hamburg (7 September 1982)
- Highest scoring: Dortmund 11–1 Bielefeld (12 goals) (6 November 1982)

The 1982–83 Bundesliga was the 20th season of the Bundesliga, West Germany's premier football league. It began on 17 August 1982 and ended on 4 June 1983. Hamburger SV were the defending champions.

== Competition modus ==
Every team played two games against each other team, one at home and one away. Teams received two points for a win and one point for a draw. If two or more teams were tied on points, places were determined by goal difference and, if still tied, by goals scored. The team with the most points were crowned champions while the two teams with the fewest points were relegated to 2. Bundesliga. The third-to-last team had to compete in a two-legged relegation/promotion play-off against the third-placed team from 2. Bundesliga.

== Team changes to 1981–82 ==
SV Darmstadt 98 and MSV Duisburg were directly relegated to the 2. Bundesliga after finishing in the last two places. They were replaced by FC Schalke 04 and Hertha BSC. Relegation/promotion play-off participant Bayer 04 Leverkusen won on aggregate against Kickers Offenbach and thus retained their Bundesliga status.

== Team overview ==
Location of teams in Bundesliga 1982–83

Club	Location	Ground	Capacity
Hertha BSC Berlin	West Berlin	Olympiastadion	100,000
Arminia Bielefeld	Bielefeld	Stadion Alm	35,000
VfL Bochum	Bochum	Ruhrstadion	40,000
Eintracht Braunschweig	Braunschweig	Stadion an der Hamburger Straße	38,000
SV Werder Bremen	Bremen	Weserstadion	32,000
Borussia Dortmund	Dortmund	Westfalenstadion	54,000
Fortuna Düsseldorf	Düsseldorf	Rheinstadion	59,600
Eintracht Frankfurt	Frankfurt am Main	Waldstadion	62,000
Hamburger SV	Hamburg	Volksparkstadion	80,000
1. FC Kaiserslautern	Kaiserslautern	Stadion Betzenberg	42,000
Karlsruher SC	Karlsruhe	Wildparkstadion	50,000
1. FC Köln	Cologne	Müngersdorfer Stadion	61,000
Bayer 04 Leverkusen	Leverkusen	Ulrich-Haberland-Stadion	20,000
Borussia Mönchengladbach	Mönchengladbach	Bökelbergstadion	34,500
FC Bayern Munich	Munich	Olympiastadion	80,000
1. FC Nürnberg	Nuremberg	Städtisches Stadion	64,238
FC Schalke 04	Gelsenkirchen	Parkstadion	70,000
VfB Stuttgart	Stuttgart	Neckarstadion	72,000

== League table ==
Pos	Team	Pld	W	D	L	GF	GA	GD	Pts	Qualification or relegation
1	Hamburger SV (C)	34	20	12	2	79	33	+46	52	Qualification to European Cup first round
2	Werder Bremen	34	23	6	5	76	38	+38	52	Qualification to UEFA Cup first round (Note: As 1. FC Köln qualified for the Cup Winners' Cup, their UEFA Cup spot was transferred to Kaiserslautern.)
3	VfB Stuttgart	34	20	8	6	80	47	+33	48	Qualification to UEFA Cup first round
4	Bayern Munich	34	17	10	7	74	33	+41	44	Qualification to UEFA Cup first round
5	1. FC Köln	34	17	9	8	69	42	+27	43	Qualification to Cup Winners' Cup first round
6	1. FC Kaiserslautern	34	14	13	7	57	44	+13	41	Qualification to UEFA Cup first round
7	Borussia Dortmund	34	16	7	11	78	62	+16	39	
8	Arminia Bielefeld	34	12	7	15	46	71	−25	31	
9	Fortuna Düsseldorf	34	11	8	15	63	75	−12	30	
10	Eintracht Frankfurt	34	12	5	17	48	57	−9	29	
11	Bayer Leverkusen	34	10	9	15	43	66	−23	29	
12	Borussia Mönchengladbach	34	12	4	18	64	63	+1	28	
13	VfL Bochum	34	8	12	14	43	49	−6	28	
14	1. FC Nürnberg	34	11	6	17	44	70	−26	28	
15	Eintracht Braunschweig	34	8	11	15	42	65	−23	27	
16	Schalke 04 (R)	34	8	6	20	48	68	−20	22	Qualification to relegation play-offs
17	Karlsruher SC (R)	34	7	7	20	39	86	−47	21	Relegation to 2. Bundesliga
18	Hertha BSC (R)	34	5	10	19	43	67	−24	20	Relegation to 2. Bundesliga

Source: www.dfb.de
Rules for classification: 1) points; 2) goal difference; 3) number of goals scored.
(C) Champions; (R) Relegated

== Results ==
Home \ Away	BSC	DSC	BOC	EBS	SVW	BVB	F95	SGE	HSV	FCK	KSC	KOE	B04	BMG	FCB	FCN	S04	VFB
Hertha BSC	—	2–0	1–1	3–3	0–1	1–3	1–1	1–0	1–2	0–0	5–2	0–0	3–3	0–2	1–3	5–1	2–3	1–0
Arminia Bielefeld	2–1	—	1–1	2–0	1–2	1–0	2–1	2–1	2–0	2–2	5–1	2–0	0–2	4–2	2–4	3–0	3–2	2–2
VfL Bochum	4–0	1–1	—	0–2	1–2	2–2	3–1	1–2	1–1	1–1	0–1	0–0	3–2	3–1	0–0	6–0	2–1	2–2
Eintracht Braunschweig	1–0	3–0	0–2	—	3–1	0–0	2–1	1–0	2–4	1–1	5–1	2–2	1–3	0–0	1–1	2–2	1–1	1–2
Werder Bremen	3–1	5–1	3–2	6–0	—	4–2	2–2	3–0	3–2	3–0	3–0	1–1	3–1	2–0	1–0	3–2	4–0	3–2
Borussia Dortmund	2–1	11–1	3–1	3–2	0–0	—	1–2	4–1	1–3	4–0	4–3	2–0	3–3	4–6	4–4	4–0	2–0	1–1
Fortuna Düsseldorf	1–1	2–0	2–0	5–0	2–5	2–3	—	5–1	0–6	2–1	4–3	2–6	4–0	2–1	3–5	3–1	3–1	1–1
Eintracht Frankfurt	3–1	2–1	0–1	0–1	0–1	3–1	2–2	—	1–1	2–2	2–0	3–0	5–0	3–0	1–0	3–0	3–2	3–0
Hamburger SV	1–1	3–1	0–0	4–0	1–1	5–0	2–0	3–0	—	1–1	4–0	2–1	3–0	4–3	1–1	3–0	6–2	2–0
1. FC Kaiserslautern	2–2	3–0	1–0	3–2	2–1	0–2	3–1	3–0	2–2	—	7–0	3–2	2–0	3–0	3–2	2–1	2–0	2–3
Karlsruher SC	1–1	1–1	0–0	3–1	1–2	2–0	2–1	1–0	1–2	1–1	—	1–1	2–2	2–0	0–4	2–1	2–2	1–2
1. FC Köln	3–2	1–0	4–1	3–1	2–1	2–2	4–0	2–2	1–1	3–0	4–1	—	4–1	2–1	2–0	5–2	2–1	1–2
Bayer Leverkusen	2–1	0–1	1–0	1–0	1–1	1–2	3–3	1–1	0–1	0–0	3–1	0–0	—	3–2	1–1	1–0	3–1	0–3
Borussia Mönchengladbach	3–1	3–0	3–1	3–0	1–2	2–3	5–0	3–1	1–1	4–2	5–0	1–4	3–1	—	0–0	1–2	0–0	1–4
Bayern Munich	4–0	5–0	3–0	1–1	1–1	3–0	1–0	4–0	2–2	0–1	6–1	0–1	5–0	3–1	—	1–0	0–1	4–0
1. FC Nürnberg	4–2	1–1	1–1	0–0	2–0	3–2	3–1	3–0	2–2	1–1	3–1	2–1	0–1	1–0	2–3	—	3–2	0–5
Schalke 04	2–0	5–0	2–0	3–3	0–2	1–2	3–3	3–2	1–2	0–0	1–0	1–4	2–0	2–4	1–2	0–1	—	1–3
VfB Stuttgart	4–1	2–2	5–2	4–0	4–1	2–1	1–1	4–1	1–2	1–1	4–1	2–1	5–3	3–2	1–1	3–0	2–1	—

Source: DFB
Legend: Blue = home team win; Yellow = draw; Red = away team win.

== Relegation play-offs ==
FC Schalke 04 and third-placed 2. Bundesliga team Bayer 05 Uerdingen had to compete in a two-legged relegation/promotion play-off. Uerdingen won 4–2 on aggregate and thus were promoted to the Bundesliga.

15 June 1983

Bayer Uerdingen	3–1	FC Schalke 04
Feilzer 7', 39'; Herget 44'	Report link (in German)	Drexler 77'

Grotenburg-Stadion, Krefeld
Attendance: 26,000
Referee: Aron Schmidhuber (Ottobrunn)

19 June 1983

FC Schalke 04	1–1	Bayer Uerdingen
Drexler 63'	Report link (in German)	Schuhmacher 83'

Parkstadion, Gelsenkirchen
Attendance: 60,000
Referee: Manfred Neuner (Leimen)

== Top goalscorers ==
Rank	Player	Team	Goals
1	(Germany) Rudi Völler	SV Werder Bremen	23
2	(Germany) Karl Allgöwer	VfB Stuttgart	21
2	(Iceland) Atli Eðvaldsson	Fortuna Düsseldorf	21
4	(Germany) Karl-Heinz Rummenigge	FC Bayern Munich	20
5	(Germany) Horst Hrubesch	Hamburger SV	18
6	(Germany) Manfred Burgsmüller	Borussia Dortmund	17
6	(Germany) Dieter Hoeneß	FC Bayern Munich	17
8	(Germany) Rüdiger Abramczik	Borussia Dortmund	16
8	(Germany) Pierre Littbarski	1. FC Köln	16
10	(South Korea) Cha Bum-kun	Eintracht Frankfurt	15

== Champion squad ==
Hamburger SV
Goalkeeper: Uli Stein (34).

Defenders: Holger Hieronymus (32 / 3); Manfred Kaltz (31 / 8); Ditmar Jakobs (31 / 5); Jürgen Groh (31); Michael Schröder (2); Michael Schmidt (1).
Midfielders: Felix Magath (34 / 4); Bernd Wehmeyer (34 / 2); Wolfgang Rolff (32 / 4); Jimmy Hartwig (31 / 6); Allan Hansen (Denmark) (13 / 3).
Forwards: Jürgen Milewski (31 / 14); Horst Hrubesch (captain; 30 / 18); Lars Bastrup (Denmark) (25 / 5); Thomas von Heesen (20 / 6); Boriša Đorđević (Socialist Federal Republic of Yugoslavia) (2).
(league appearances and goals listed in brackets)

Manager: Ernst Happel (Austria) .

On the roster but did not play in a league game: Uwe Hain; Dieter Brefort; Ralf Brunnecker.

== See also ==
- 1982–83 2. Bundesliga
- 1982–83 DFB-Pokal
