= Michael Schmidt =

Michael or Mike Schmidt may refer to:

- Michael Schmidt (agriculture) (born 1954), Canadian dairy farmer
- Michael Schmidt (bowling) (born 1980), Canadian bowling player
- Michael Schmidt (designer), wardrobing, jewelry and interiors designer
- Michael Schmidt (footballer) (born 1962), retired German football player
- Michael Schmidt (photographer) (1945–2014), German photographer
- Michael Schmidt (poet) (born 1947), poet and scholar
- Michael Schmidt (pool player) (born 1966), German pool player
- Michael Schmidt Jr. (born 1958), American sport shooter
- Michael B. Schmidt, German singer/rapper known as Smudo
- Michael J. Schmidt, United States Air Force general
- Michael Q. Schmidt (1953–2025), American actor
- Michael S. Schmidt (born 1983), correspondent for The New York Times
- Mike Schmidt (born 1949), baseball player
- Mike Schmidt (American football) (born c. 1985), American football coach
- Mike Schmidt (ice hockey) (born 1961), German ice hockey player
- Mike Schmidt (lawyer), American attorney and prosecutor

== See also ==
- Michael Schmid (disambiguation)
