= Ulrich van den Berg =

Ulrich van den Berg may refer to:

- Ulrich van den Berg (golfer) (born 1975), South African golfer
- Ulrich van den Berg (footballer) (1949–2016), German footballer
