= 1982–83 2. Bundesliga =

9th season of the second-tier football league in Germany

2. Bundesliga
- Season: 1982–83
- Champions: SV Waldhof Mannheim
- Promoted: SV Waldhof Mannheim; Kickers Offenbach; Bayer Uerdingen
- Relegated: FC Augsburg; SpVgg Fürth; FSV Frankfurt; TuS Schloß Neuhaus
- Matches: 380
- Top goalscorer: Dieter Schatzschneider (31 goals)
- Average attendance: 5,110

The 1982–83 2. Bundesliga season was the ninth season of the 2. Bundesliga, the second tier of the German football league system.

SV Waldhof Mannheim, Bayer Uerdingen and Kickers Offenbach were promoted to the Bundesliga while FC Augsburg, SpVgg Fürth, FSV Frankfurt and TuS Schloß Neuhaus were relegated to the Oberliga.

== League table ==
For the 1982–83 season FSV Frankfurt, FC Augsburg, BV Lüttringhausen and TuS Schloß Neuhaus were newly promoted to the 2. Bundesliga from the Oberliga while SV Darmstadt 98 and MSV Duisburg had been relegated to the league from the Bundesliga.

Locations of the participating teams of the 1982–83 season

Pos	Team	Pld	W	D	L	GF	GA	GD	Pts	Promotion, qualification or relegation
1	Waldhof Mannheim (C, P)	38	21	10	7	83	38	+45	52	Promotion to Bundesliga
2	Kickers Offenbach (P)	38	21	8	9	77	45	+32	50	Promotion to Bundesliga
3	Bayer 05 Uerdingen (O, P)	38	19	10	9	65	44	+21	48	Qualification to promotion play-offs
4	KSV Hessen Kassel	38	20	5	13	69	45	+24	45	
5	Stuttgarter Kickers	38	18	8	12	78	51	+27	44	
6	SC Fortuna Köln	38	15	13	10	76	50	+26	43	
7	SV Darmstadt 98	38	16	10	12	77	61	+16	42	
8	SC Freiburg	38	13	16	9	50	45	+5	42	
9	Alemannia Aachen	38	15	10	13	49	53	−4	40	
10	VfL Osnabrück	38	16	6	16	66	65	+1	38	
11	MSV Duisburg	38	14	9	15	55	57	−2	37	
12	Hannover 96	38	13	10	15	70	75	−5	36	
13	BV Lüttringhausen	38	13	8	17	53	76	−23	34	
14	Rot-Weiss Essen	38	12	9	17	56	60	−4	33	
15	SG Wattenscheid 09	38	13	7	18	59	65	−6	33	
16	SG Union Solingen	38	11	10	17	56	76	−20	32	
17	FC Augsburg (R)	38	11	10	17	32	54	−22	32	Relegation to Oberliga
18	SpVgg Fürth (R)	38	10	11	17	55	75	−20	31	Relegation to Oberliga
19	FSV Frankfurt (R)	38	9	8	21	50	86	−36	26	Relegation to Oberliga
20	TuS Schloß Neuhaus (R)	38	7	8	23	43	92	−49	22	Relegation to Oberliga

Source: kicker.de
(C) Champions; (O) Play-off winners; (P) Promoted; (R) Relegated

== Results ==
Home \ Away	AAC	FCA	D98	DUI	RWE	FSV	SCF	FUE	H96	KAS	FKO	BVL	WMA	KOF	OSN	SCN	SGU	SKI	B05	SGW
Alemannia Aachen	—	2–1	0–0	0–0	0–0	5–1	1–1	3–1	1–2	1–1	0–0	3–0	3–1	1–0	0–1	1–0	2–1	1–0	2–1	1–2
FC Augsburg	2–1	—	2–1	2–1	0–0	2–1	1–1	3–0	2–2	1–0	1–1	0–0	0–0	2–0	0–2	2–1	3–0	0–2	1–1	1–0
Darmstadt 98	2–1	1–0	—	6–2	3–1	6–2	2–3	3–0	2–1	4–2	1–1	4–0	1–1	0–2	2–1	7–0	4–1	1–2	2–0	1–0
MSV Duisburg	1–1	0–1	3–3	—	0–2	4–1	1–1	1–0	3–1	1–0	2–3	3–0	3–3	0–1	2–0	2–2	1–1	3–1	0–1	2–0
Rot-Weiss Essen	0–1	3–0	2–2	2–2	—	2–4	3–0	1–1	0–0	6–1	2–4	2–1	0–1	4–2	0–1	5–0	3–1	1–0	3–1	4–0
FSV Frankfurt	1–3	2–0	1–2	2–1	3–1	—	0–0	2–0	1–2	3–6	2–0	2–1	0–2	1–3	2–1	1–1	1–1	0–3	2–2	0–2
SC Freiburg	4–1	2–0	1–1	1–1	1–1	1–1	—	1–1	2–0	2–1	1–1	3–0	1–1	3–3	1–1	4–0	2–2	0–1	1–0	2–1
SpVgg Fürth	2–2	3–1	3–2	1–0	0–0	2–2	2–1	—	2–2	2–2	2–0	4–2	1–0	2–2	2–1	0–2	5–1	2–1	1–1	2–3
Hannover 96	3–3	1–1	1–2	2–3	4–0	2–1	0–2	3–1	—	1–2	4–2	2–2	2–2	2–0	4–3	6–1	3–1	1–1	0–3	2–0
Hessen Kassel	3–0	3–0	1–0	3–1	3–0	0–1	0–0	3–1	3–1	—	2–2	2–0	1–1	3–2	1–2	4–2	2–0	3–1	2–0	2–1
Fortuna Köln	0–0	7–0	3–0	2–0	2–2	6–1	3–0	2–2	3–2	2–0	—	3–0	1–1	1–4	4–0	4–2	3–0	1–2	0–0	1–2
BV Lüttringhausen	3–0	0–0	2–2	2–0	3–0	1–1	1–0	4–2	6–3	0–2	0–2	—	5–2	1–1	3–2	4–2	1–0	4–1	1–1	2–1
Waldhof Mannheim	5–1	4–0	3–1	3–0	3–1	3–0	0–3	4–0	4–1	2–1	2–1	8–0	—	0–1	3–0	3–0	2–2	2–0	1–1	4–0
Kickers Offenbach	2–0	3–2	2–2	1–2	3–0	6–2	3–0	3–2	5–1	2–0	3–2	2–0	0–2	—	4–0	2–1	2–0	1–1	4–0	3–2
VfL Osnabrück	1–2	2–0	1–1	0–2	2–1	3–1	3–0	2–1	0–3	2–0	4–2	5–0	0–2	1–1	—	3–1	5–3	2–2	5–1	2–2
TuS Schloß Neuhaus	3–1	1–0	3–1	0–1	1–0	2–0	1–1	1–1	1–1	1–5	1–1	1–2	0–2	1–2	1–1	—	2–3	3–1	1–3	0–5
Union Solingen	3–0	2–1	3–2	2–0	2–3	6–3	0–1	2–1	1–1	0–2	2–2	3–0	2–0	1–0	1–3	1–1	—	2–2	1–1	2–1
Stuttgarter Kickers	1–2	2–0	1–1	4–1	4–0	1–0	4–1	4–0	4–0	5–1	2–1	3–0	2–4	1–1	4–2	6–1	1–1	—	3–4	3–1
Bayer Uerdingen	3–1	2–0	5–0	1–3	2–0	2–1	3–0	3–0	2–1	0–1	1–1	0–0	2–1	2–1	4–2	3–0	4–0	2–1	—	3–1
SG Wattenscheid	1–2	0–0	4–2	1–3	2–1	1–1	0–2	5–3	0–3	4–1	0–2	4–2	1–1	0–0	2–0	3–2	6–2	1–1	0–0	—

Source: DFB
Legend: Blue = home team win; Yellow = draw; Red = away team win.

== Season statistics ==
=== Top scorers ===
The league's top scorers:

Rank	Player	Team	Goals
1	(Germany) Dieter Schatzschneider	Fortuna Köln/Hannover 96	31
2	(Germany) Bodo Mattern	SV Darmstadt 98	21
2	(Germany) Fritz Walter	SV Waldhof Mannheim	21
4	(Germany) Uwe Bein	Kickers Offenbach	20
4	(Germany) Klaus Täuber	Stuttgarter Kickers	20
6	(Germany) Franz Michelberger	Kickers Offenbach	19
7	(Germany) Uwe Dreher	Stuttgarter Kickers	18
7	(Germany) Wolfgang Schäfer	SG Union Solingen	18
9	(Germany) Wolfgang Metzler	SpVgg Fürth	17
9	(Germany) Heinz Traser	KSV Hessen Kassel	17
