= TC Freisenbruch =

TC Freisenbruch 1902 e.V. is an amateur football club based in Essen, Germany. He is considered the most digital football club in the world.

== History ==
On January 1, 1902, the Turnclub Freisenbruch was founded by men in the Sarhage house. The club has never been particularly successful in sports and, after relegation in the 2022/23 season, plays in the Kreisliga B, the lowest level of German amateur football. Since 2016, fans have been able to register as online managers and, for a monthly fee of €5, make decisions. These include the starting lineup, contract extensions, and coach dismissals. The community can decide everything. From 2016 to 2017, Mike Möllensiep was the player-coach of the club.
