= Michael Schmid =

Michael Schmid or Mike Schmid may refer to:

- Michael Schmid (skier) (born 1984), Swiss freestyle skier
- Michael Schmid (rower) (born 1988), Swiss rower
- Michael Schmid (Austrian politician) (born 1945), Austrian architect, politician, and former Minister of Transport
- Mike Schmid (politician), American politician from Wyoming
- Mike Schmid (musician), American singer/songwriter
- Mike Schmid (rugby union) (born 1969), Canadian rugby union player

== See also ==
- Michael Schmidt (disambiguation)
