= Van der Sandt =

Van der Sandt is a Dutch and Afrikaans surname. Notable people with the surname include:

- Albert van der Sandt Centlivres (1887–1966), South African jurist
- Johann van der Sandt, South African academic
- Maximilian van der Sandt (1578–1656), Dutch Jesuit theologian
- Johandre van der Sandt (TBC), South African resident

== See also ==
- Sandt
