= Web FC =

French football club

Web F.C. is a semi-professional lower-level French football club that plays in a regional league called the Ligue de Basse-Normandie. Web F.C. allows its members, called "entraînautes," to vote on strategic and tactical decisions through the club's website, including selection of the starting team.

Web F.C. is a predecessor to several ventures that seek to place more decision-making capabilities in the hands of a football club's fans, such as MyFootballClub in England. Unlike MyFootballClub's members, however, members of Web F.C. do not have to pay a fee to participate in the decision-making, but the more they participate, the more value his or her vote is accorded.
