= Manfred Kreuz =

German footballer (1936–2026)

Personal information
- Date of birth: 7 March 1936
- Place of birth: Gelsenkirchen, Gau Westphalia-North, Germany
- Date of death: 22 April 2026 (aged 90)
- Positions: Left winger; forward

Senior career*
Years	Team	Apps	(Gls)
1956–1968	Schalke 04	218	(59)
- * Club domestic league appearances and goals

Manfred Kreuz (7 March 1936 – 22 April 2026) was a German footballer who played as a left winger and forward, spending his entire career for Schalke 04. From 1956 until 1963, he completed 135 matches (42 goals) in the Oberliga West. Between 1963 and 1968, he was the captain of Schalke and made 83 appearances (17 goals) in the Bundesliga.

In 1958, he won the German championship. He was also an honorary captain of Schalke and a member of the honorary presidium.

Kreuz died on 22 April 2026, at the age of 90.
