= Hans Tibulski =

German footballer

Personal information
- Date of birth: 22 February 1909
- Date of death: 25 August 1976 (aged 67)
- Position: Forward

Senior career*
Years	Team	Apps	(Gls)
- FC Schalke 04

International career
1931	Germany	1	(0)
- * Club domestic league appearances and goals

Hans Tibulski (22 February 1909 – 25 August 1976) was a German international footballer.

His younger brother Otto Tibulski was also an international footballer (they are among 14 sets of siblings to have played for Germany).
