= Pavel Mačák =

Czech soccer player

Personal information
- Date of birth: 7 February 1957 (age 69)
- Place of birth: Czechoslovakia
- Position: Goalkeeper

Senior career*
Years	Team	Apps	(Gls)
1978–1982	Baník	53	(0)
1983–1987	Schalke	17	(0)
1987–1988	ASC Schöppingen		
1989–1991	FC 96		
1994	FC Remscheid		
- * Club domestic league appearances and goals

Pavel Mačák (born 7 February 1957) is a Czech former footballer who is last known to have played as a goalkeeper for FC Remscheid.

== Career ==
In 1983, Mačák signed for German second division side Schalke, where he made 17 league appearances and scored 0 goals, helping them earn promotion to the German Bundesliga. On 11 February 1984, he debuted for Schalke during a 3–0 win over Rot-Weiß Oberhausen. In 1987, he signed for ASC Schöppingen in the German third division. In 1989, Mačák signed for German fourth division club FC 96, helping them earn promotion to the German third division.
