= Reiner Edelmann =

German association football player

Personal information
- Date of birth: 19 March 1965 (age 61)
- Place of birth: Bellheim, West Germany
- Height: 1.75 m (5 ft 9 in)
- Position: Forward

Senior career*
Years	Team	Apps	(Gls)
1983–1985	Waldhof Mannheim	2	(0)
1986–1987	SV Schwetzingen		
1987–1990	Schalke 04	95	(12)
1990–1991	Preußen Münster	34	(8)
1991–1992	K.V. Kortrijk	28	(5)
1992–1994	VfR Mannheim	36	(3)
1994–1996	Eintracht Trier		
1996–1997	TuS Koblenz		
2001–2002	SV Weingarten		
2002–2003	ASV Landau		
- * Club domestic league appearances and goals

Reiner Edelmann (born 19 March 1965) is a retired German footballer. He made 32 appearances in the Bundesliga for Waldhof Mannheim and Schalke 04 as well as 99 matches in the 2. Bundesliga for Preußen Münster and Schalke.
