= Plishka =

Plishka is a surname. Notable people with the surname include:

- Paul Plishka (1941–2025), American operatic bass
- Volodymyr Plishka (born 1991), Ukrainian footballer
