= Bernd Thiele =

German association football player

Personal information
- Date of birth: 24 January 1956
- Place of birth: Fehmarn, West Germany
- Date of death: 26 March 2017 (aged 61)
- Place of death: Mogán, Spain
- Height: 1.76 m (5 ft 9 in)
- Positions: Right back; defensive midfielder

Youth career
- 1972–1973: Schalke 04

Senior career*
Years	Team	Apps	(Gls)
1973–1983	Schalke 04	189	(6)
1983–1986	Hannover 96	80	(4)
- * Club domestic league appearances and goals

Bernd Thiele (24 January 1956 – 26 March 2017) was a German footballer. He made 178 appearances in the Bundesliga and played 91 matches in the 2. Bundesliga for Schalke 04 and Hannover 96.
