= Otto Tibulski =

German footballer

Personal information
- Full name: Otto Tibulski
- Date of birth: 15 December 1912
- Place of birth: Germany
- Date of death: 25 February 1991 (aged 78)
- Position: Defender

Senior career*
Years	Team	Apps	(Gls)
1930–1941	Schalke 04		
1941	Hertha BSC		
1942–1948	Schalke 04		

International career
1936–1939	Germany	2	(0)
- * Club domestic league appearances and goals

Otto Tibulski (15 December 1912 – 25 February 1991) was a German footballer who played as a defender for Schalke 04 and Hertha BSC. He also represented the Germany national team, earning two caps between 1936 and 1939.

His elder brother Hans Tibulski was also an international footballer (they are among 14 sets of siblings to have played for Germany).
