= Wolfgang Sandt =

German sculptor and author

Wolfgang Sandt (born 1960 in Munich) is a German sculptor and author. His best known work is probably the creation of the KZ-Memorial at the Dachau subcamp at Ottobrunn, Germany, between 1987 and 2001. The memorial to the Ottobrunn extermination camp, created in 1987, stood in the inner courtyard of the Gymnasium Ottobrunn since 1996, before it was moved to its current location in Rosenheimer Landstrasse/Unterhachinger Strasse in 2001.

== Personal life ==
After attending the Academy of Fine Arts, Munich (German:Fachoberschule für Gestaltung), in Munich between 1979 - 1981, Sandt completed an apprenticeship as a stonemason and stone sculptor, which he completed in 1995 with the master title. Since 1985, he has worked with various sculptors, mainly working in the public space and in the sacred area. From 1987 to 2001 he worked on the creation and installation of the memorial for the Ottobrunn camp outside Dachau. Sandt works as a freelance artist and is a member of the FMDK (Free Munich and German artist) and the Art Association (German:Kunstverein) Ottobrunn.

== Sculptures in public spaces ==
- Order for the organization of the 1st "Bavarian Janus Prize" for the state archives of Bavaria
- Municipality of Haar, Gronsdorfer Straße, "Srebrenica"
- Municipality of Ottobrunn, Sculpture Gardens at the Town Hall, "Fragile Stele IV"
- Municipality Ottobrunn, Rosenheimer Landstraße, memorial outside camp Dachau
- Municipality of Ottobrunn, Sculpture Gardens at the Town Hall, "Fern in mir"
