= Willi Koslowski =

German footballer (1937–2024)

Personal information
- Date of birth: 17 February 1937
- Place of birth: Gelsenkirchen, Gau Westphalia-North, Germany
- Date of death: 11 July 2024 (aged 87)
- Position: Forward

Youth career
- Buer 07
- Schalke 04

Senior career*
Years	Team	Apps	(Gls)
1957–1963	Schalke 04^{OL West}		
1963–1965	Schalke 04^{Bundesliga}	39	(12)
1965–1967	Rot-Weiss Essen	25	(2)

International career
1962	West Germany	3	(1)
- * Club domestic league appearances and goals

Willi Koslowski (17 February 1937 – 11 July 2024) was a German professional footballer who played as a forward. He scored his only goal for West Germany on his debut, the third one of the West Germans in a 3–0 win over Uruguay in April 1962. He added two further appearances, one at the 1962 FIFA World Cup against Switzerland (2–1) at Estadio Nacional de Chile on 3 June, the same year. Koslowski died on 11 July 2024, at the age of 87.
