= Thomas Student =

German association football player

Personal information
- Date of birth: 28 October 1897
- Date of death: 11 February 1976 (aged 78)
- Position: Defender

Senior career*
Years	Team	Apps	(Gls)
1916–1928	Schalke 04		
- * Club domestic league appearances and goals

Thomas Student (28 October 1897 – 11 February 1976) was a German footballer. In 1916, he became the first team captain of Schalke 04, then called Westfalia Schalke. He held the captaincy until 1928.

In 2008, Schalke named him posthumously as an honorary captain of the club.
