= Andreas Sandt =

German footballer

Personal information
- Full name: Andreas Sandt
- Date of birth: 5 November 1962 (age 63)
- Position: Goalkeeper

Youth career
- –1980: FC Schalke 04

Senior career*
Years	Team	Apps	(Gls)
1980–1981	FC Schalke 04	1	(0)
1981–1983	VfL Bochum II		
- * Club domestic league appearances and goals

Andreas Sandt (born 5 November 1962) is retired a Germany football goalkeeper.
