= Ulrich van den Berg (footballer) =

German footballer (1949–2016)

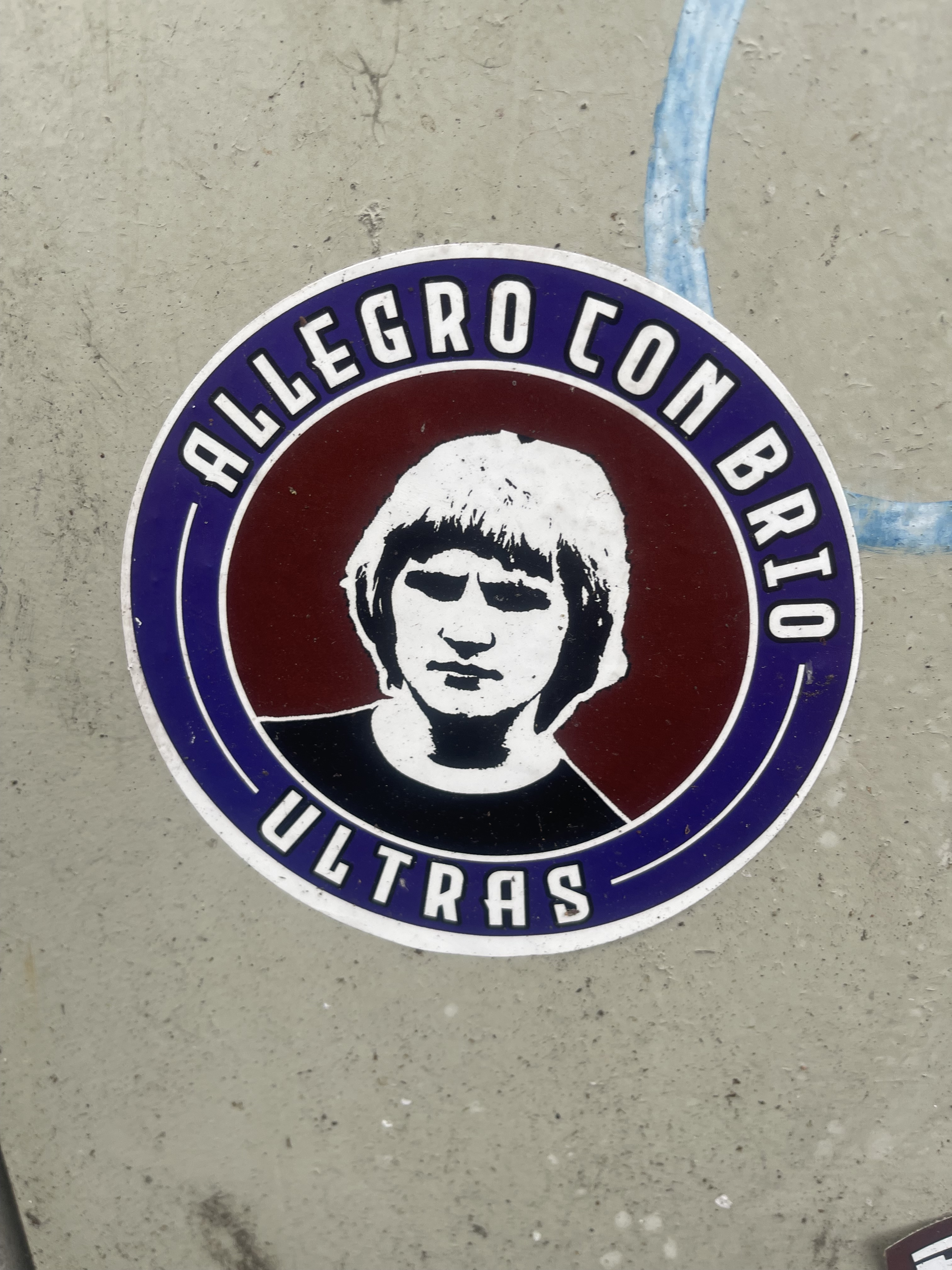
- van den Berg in a fan sticker

Personal information
- Date of birth: 29 October 1949
- Place of birth: Gelsenkirchen-Schalke, North Rhine-Westphalia, West Germany
- Date of death: 2 December 2016 (aged 67)
- Place of death: Bonn, North Rhine-Westphalia, Germany
- Height: 1.78 m (5 ft 10 in)
- Position: Midfielder

Youth career
- 1961–1969: FC Schalke 04 youth

Senior career*
Years	Team	Apps	(Gls)
1968–1971	FC Schalke 04 amateurs		
1971–1976	FC Schalke 04	60	(4)
1976–1988	Bonner SC	276	(75)
Total		336	(79)
- * Club domestic league appearances and goals

Ulrich van den Berg (29 October 1949 – 2 December 2016) was a German footballer. Nicknamed "Uli", he played as a midfielder for FC Schalke 04 and Bonner SC throughout the 1970s and the 1980s.

== Club career ==
Van den Berg began his career within the youth sector of FC Schalke 04 beginning in 1961 and remained there throughout the 1960s. In 1969, he was promoted to the clubs amateur sector where he remained within the Landesliga for the following three seasons. However, following the 1971 Bundesliga scandal, many Schalke 04 players had their licenses suspended and transferred to different clubs. This led to van den Berg being promoted to the main Starting XI for the 1971–72 season under manager Ivica Horvat. His first Bundesliga goal occurred in a 3–1 home victory over Hannover 96 on 16 September 1972. He remained within the Starting XI throughout the first three seasons with four goals, six games within the DFB-Pokal and in three European Cup matches. However, his final season saw him suddenly only make four appearances throughout the 1975–76 season.

This led to van den Berg moving over to Bonner SC for their 1976–77 season that had just been promoted to the 2. Bundesliga. The club narrowly avoided relegation at 16th place with van den Berg himself contributing to their stay power with 8 goals in 31 appearances. However, Bonner soon became the first club in German football to lose their license by the DFB on 9 July 1977 following their inability to pay player salaries. Despite many players soon departing after the club's relegation to the third-tier Oberliga, he remained with the club for the remainder of his career, going on to be the club's record goalscorer at 75 goals in 276 goals with many of them being headers by the time of his retirement in 1988.

== Later life ==
Following his career as a player, van den Berg, known for his reserved nature, worked at a car dealership in Bonn and was active in sports at the Blau-Gold tennis club and on the golf course.

He died on 2 December 2016, a few weeks after his 67th birthday.
