= Michael Schmidt (footballer) =

German footballer

Personal information
- Full name: Michael Schmidt
- Date of birth: 6 August 1962 (age 64)
- Place of birth: Berlin, West Germany
- Height: 1.75 m (5 ft 9 in)
- Position: Defender

Senior career*
Years	Team	Apps	(Gls)
–1982	SCC Berlin		
1982–1983	Hamburger SV	1	(0)
1983–1992	Blau-Weiss Berlin	245	(1)
1992–1993	Reinickendorfer Füchse		
- * Club domestic league appearances and goals

Michael Schmidt (born 6 August 1962) is a German former football player. He spent two seasons in the Bundesliga with Hamburger SV and SpVgg Blau-Weiß 1890 Berlin.

== Honours ==
- European Cup winner: 1983.
- Bundesliga champion: 1983.
