= Manfred Drexler =

German association football player

Personal information
- Date of birth: 26 June 1951
- Place of birth: Fürth, West Germany
- Date of death: 4 October 2017 (aged 66)
- Height: 1.86 m (6 ft 1 in)
- Position(s): Midfielder, sweeper

Senior career*
| Years | Team | Apps | (Gls) |
| 1970–1973 | 1. FC Nürnberg | 72 | (28) |
| 1973–1979 | Darmstadt 98 | 141 | (47) |
| 1979–1985 | Schalke 04 | 129 | (28) |
- * Club domestic league appearances and goals

Manfred Drexler (26 June 1951 – 4 October 2017) was a German footballer who played as a midfielder and sweeper.
