= Heinz Pliska =

German footballer

Personal information
- Date of birth: 23 October 1941 (age 84)
- Place of birth: Gelsenkirchen, Germany
- Height: 1.80 m (5 ft 11 in)
- Position: Midfielder

Senior career*
Years	Team	Apps	(Gls)
1961–1963	Eintracht Gelsenkirchen	44	(6)
1963–1965	Hamborn 07	66	(0)
1965–1969	Schalke 04	75	(2)
1969–1970	SV Erle 08		
- * Club domestic league appearances and goals

Heinz Pliska (born 23 October 1941) is a retired German footballer. He played in the Bundesliga for Schalke 04.
