= Mike Möllensiep =

German footballer (1975–2019)

Personal information
- Date of birth: 28 November 1975
- Place of birth: Gelsenkirchen, West Germany
- Date of death: 14 May 2019 (aged 43)
- Place of death: Gelsenkirchen, Germany
- Height: 1.76 m (5 ft 9 1/2 in)
- Position: Striker

Team information
- Current team: TC Freisenbruch

Youth career
- –1994: Schalke 04

Senior career*
Years	Team	Apps	(Gls)
1994–1998	Schalke 04 (A)		
1996–1998	Schalke 04	2	(0)
1998–2000	VfB Lübeck	40	(12)
1999–2000	→ TSV Pansdorf (loan)	20	(9)
2000–2001	Dynamo Dresden	15	(2)
2001–2006	Schwarz-Weiss Essen	152	(64)
2006–2007	KFC Uerdingen	32	(13)
2007–2010	SpVgg Vreden		
2010–2011	SV Zweckel		
2011–2012	GSV Moers		
2012–2016	Fortuna Gronau		
2016–2017	TC Freisenbruch		

Managerial career
- 2012–2016: Fortuna Gronau
- 2016–2017: TC Freisenbruch
- * Club domestic league appearances and goals

Mike Möllensiep (28 November 1975 – 14 May 2019) was a German footballer.
