= 1967–68 FC Bayern Munich season =

3rd season of Bayern Munich in the Bundesliga

Bayern Munich
1967–68 season
- Manager: Zlatko Čajkovski
- Bundesliga: 5th
- DFB-Pokal: Semi-finals
- Cup Winners' Cup: Semi-finals
- Top goalscorer: League: Gerd Müller (20); All: Gerd Müller (31)
Home colours	Away colours

The 1967–68 FC Bayern Munich season was the club's third season in Bundesliga.

== Review and events ==
The club reached the European Cup Winners' Cup semi-finals but lost (2–0) at the hands of AC Milan. Bayern held AC Milan to a draw in the second leg but was eliminated from the competition nevertheless. Bayern was defeated in the cup semi-finals by VfL Bochum.

== Match results ==
=== Legend ===
Win Draw Loss

=== Bundesliga ===
==== League fixtures and results ====
19 August 1967 1	Alemannia Aachen	0–4	Bayern Munich	Aachen
16:00 CET		Report	Roth 22'; Hermandung 61' (o.g.); Ohlhauser 74'; Beckenbauer 82'	Stadium: Old Tivoli; Attendance: 30,000; Referee: Gerhard Schulenburg

26 August 1967 2	Bayern Munich	1–0	Hannover 96	Munich
16:00 CET	Roth 83'	Report		Stadium: Grünwalder Stadion; Attendance: 40,000; Referee: Hans-Joachim Weyland

2 September 1967 3	Bayern Munich	0–3	1. FC Köln	Munich
16:00 CET		Report	Rühl 51'; Löhr 59', 89'	Stadium: Grünwalder Stadion; Attendance: 35,000; Referee: Jan Redelfs

9 September 1967 4	Borussia Dortmund	6–3	Bayern Munich	Dortmund
16:00 CET	Emmerich 16', 21', 59'; Assauer 57'; Wosab 62'; Libuda 90'	Report	Jung 14', 44'; Brenninger 52'	Stadium: Stadion Rote Erde; Attendance: 40,000; Referee: Klaus Ohmsen

13 September 1967 5	Bayern Munich	3–0	Karlsruher SC	Munich
20:00 CET	Ohlhauser 31', 83'; Jung 50'	Report		Stadium: Grünwalder Stadion; Attendance: 22,000; Referee: Ewald Regely

16 September 1967 6	Borussia Neunkirchen	1–1	Bayern Munich	Neunkirchen
16:00 CET	Gayer 52' (pen.)	Report	Schauß 76'	Stadium: Ellenfeldstadion; Attendance: 16,000; Referee: Hans Radermacher

23 September 1967 7	Bayern Munich	1–0	Hamburger SV	Munich
16:00 CET	Brenninger 86'	Report		Stadium: Grünwalder Stadion; Attendance: 26,000; Referee: Hans-Joachim Weyland

30 September 1967 8	Frankfurter SG Eintracht	2–3	Bayern Munich	Frankfurt
15:30 CET	Huberts 1'; Schämer 36'	Report	Müller 21' (pen.); Ohlhauser 43'; Roth 80'	Stadium: Waldstadion; Attendance: 40,000; Referee: Helmut Fritz

14 October 1967 9	Bayern Munich	3–1	Borussia Mönchengladbach	Munich
16:00 CET	Ohlhauser 14'; Müller 34'; Nowak 40'	Report	Netzer 69' (pen.)	Stadium: Grünwalder Stadion; Attendance: 34,000; Referee: Günter Linn

21 October 1967 10	Eintracht Braunschweig	1–0	Bayern Munich	Braunschweig
16:00 CET	Maas 80'	Report		Stadium: Eintracht-Stadion; Attendance: 30,000; Referee: Willi Thier

28 October 1967 11	Bayern Munich	2–2	1860 Munich	Munich
16:00 CET	Ohlhauser 37'; Koulmann 87'	Report	Kohlars 26'; Heiß 83'	Stadium: Grünwalder Stadion; Attendance: 44,000; Referee: Ferdinand Biwersi

4 November 1967 12	FC Schalke 04	0–1	Bayern Munich	Gelsenkirchen
16:00 CET		Report	Ohlhauser 54'	Stadium: Glückauf-Kampfbahn; Attendance: 25,000; Referee: Edgar Deuschel

11 November 1967 13	Bayern Munich	3–1	VfB Stuttgart	Munich
16:00 CET	Ohlhauser 62'; Müller 74' (pen.); Brenninger 87'	Report	Köppel 77'	Stadium: Grünwalder Stadion; Attendance: 18,000; Referee: Gerd Hennig

18 November 1967 14	Werder Bremen	4–1	Bayern Munich	Bremen
16:00 CET	Höttges 15' (pen.) 87' (pen.); Görts 50', 81'	Report	Höttges 26' (o.g.)	Stadium: Weserstadion; Attendance: 25,000; Referee: Walter Eschweiler

25 November 1967 15	Bayern Munich	4–1	1. FC Kaiserslautern	Munich
16:00 CET	Beckenbauer 26', 90'; Koulmann 76'; Brenninger 84'	Report	Kentschke 6'	Stadium: Grünwalder Stadion; Attendance: 14,000; Referee: Berthold Schmidt

2 December 1967 16	1. FC Nürnberg	7–3	Bayern Munich	Nuremberg
16:00 CET	Strehl 26'; Volkert 27'; Brungs 37', 51', 57', 62', 74'	Report	Müller 72'; Brenninger 77', 89'	Stadium: Städtisches Stadion; Attendance: 65,000; Referee: Johannes Malka

9 December 1967 17	Bayern Munich	0–4	MSV Duisburg	Munich
15:30 CET		Report	Kostedde 15'; Lehmann 37'; Gecks 35', 72'; Manfred Müller (red card)	Stadium: Grünwalder Stadion; Attendance: 11,000; Referee: Rolf Seekamp

6 January 1968 18	Bayern Munich	4–1	Alemannia Aachen	Munich
15:30 CET	Müller 10', 33', 52'; Ohlhauser 77'	Report	Hermandung 34'	Stadium: Grünwalder Stadion; Attendance: 12,000; Referee: Ferdinand Biwersi

13 January 1968 19	Hannover 96	2–1	Bayern Munich	Hannover
15:30 CET	Rodekamp 6'; Poulsen 57'	Report	Müller 89'	Stadium: Niedersachsenstadion; Attendance: 11,300; Referee: Gerd Hennig

20 January 1968 20	1. FC Köln	3–3	Bayern Munich	Cologne
15:30 CET	Löhr 40', 75' (pen.); Rühl 45'	Report	Koulmann 15', 25'; Müller 56' (pen.)	Stadium: Müngersdorfer Stadion; Attendance: 30,000; Referee: Gerhard Schulenburg

2 April 1968 21	Bayern Munich	2–0	Borussia Dortmund	Munich
20:00 CET	Müller 24', 44'	Report		Stadium: Grünwalder Stadion; Attendance: 25,000; Referee: Klaus Ohmsen

10 February 1968 22	Karlsruher SC	0–2	Bayern Munich	Karlsruhe
15:30 CET		Report	Ohlhauser 80'; Müller 82'	Stadium: Wildparkstadion; Attendance: 18,000; Referee: Walter Horstmann

17 February 1968 23	Bayern Munich	4–0	Borussia Neunkirchen	Munich
15:30 CET	Müller 23'; Ohlhauser 72', 82'; Beckenbauer 78'	Report		Stadium: Grünwalder Stadion; Attendance: 9,000; Referee: Hans Voss

2 March 1968 24	Hamburger SV	2–1	Bayern Munich	Hamburg
15:30 CET	Charly Dörfel 20'; Seeler 61'	Report	Roth 75'	Stadium: Volksparkstadion; Attendance: 38,000; Referee: Karl Niemeyer

9 March 1968 25	Bayern Munich	3–0	Frankfurter SG Eintracht	Munich
15:30 CET	Müller 70', 74'; Jung 78'	Report		Stadium: Grünwalder Stadion; Attendance: 13,000; Referee: Hans Radermacher

16 March 1968 26	Borussia Mönchengladbach	1–1	Bayern Munich	Mönchengladbach
15:30 CET	Netzer 39' (pen.)	Report	Müller 31'	Stadium: Bökelbergstadion; Attendance: 28,000; Referee: Horst Herden

23 March 1968 27	Bayern Munich	3–0	Eintracht Braunschweig	Munich
15:30 CET	Ohlhauser 53', 84'; Müller 88'	Report		Stadium: Grünwalder Stadion; Attendance: 15,000; Referee: Gerd Siepe

30 March 1968 28	1860 Munich	3–2	Bayern Munich	Munich
16:00 CET	Heiß 17'; Perusic 28'; Bründl 58'	Report	Roth 75'; Müller 77'	Stadium: Grünwalder Stadion; Attendance: 44,000; Referee: Kurt Tschenscher

6 April 1968 29	Bayern Munich	2–0	FC Schalke 04	Munich
15:30 CET	Ohlhauser 62'; Brenninger 75'	Report		Stadium: Grünwalder Stadion; Attendance: 14,000; Referee: Helmut Fritz

20 April 1968 30	VfB Stuttgart	3–0	Bayern Munich	Stuttgart
15:30 CET	Gress 15'; Haug 71'; Handschuh 78'	Report		Stadium: Neckarstadion; Attendance: 40,000; Referee: Fritz Oswald

27 April 1968 31	Bayern Munich	2–3	Werder Bremen	Munich
15:30 CET	Ohlhauser 46', 62'	Report	Danielsen 16'; Steinmann 84'; Lorenz 90'	Stadium: Grünwalder Stadion; Attendance: 10,000; Referee: Hans-Joachim Weyland

11 May 1968 32	1. FC Kaiserslautern	2–2	Bayern Munich	Kaiserslautern
15:30 CET	Roggensack 30'; Windhausen 50'	Report	Brenninger 43'; Koulmann 70'	Stadium: Betzenbergstadion; Attendance: 9,000; Referee: Gerhard Schulenburg

18 May 1968 33	Bayern Munich	0–2	1. FC Nürnberg	Munich
15:30 CET		Report	Brungs 29'; Strehl 39'	Stadium: Grünwalder Stadion; Attendance: 27,000; Referee: Alfred Ott

25 May 1968 34	MSV Duisburg	3–3	Bayern Munich	Duisburg
15:30 CET	Gecks 13', 34'; Pavlić 80'	Report	Ohlhauser 3', 39'; Müller 48' (pen.)	Stadium: Wedaustadion; Attendance: 12,000; Referee: Bruno Schultz

==== League standings ====
Pos	Team	Pld	W	D	L	GF	GA	GR	Pts	Qualification or relegation
3	Borussia Mönchengladbach	34	15	12	7	77	45	1.711	42	
4	1. FC Köln	34	17	4	13	68	52	1.308	38	Qualification to Cup Winners' Cup first round
5	Bayern Munich	34	16	6	12	68	58	1.172	38	
6	Eintracht Frankfurt	34	15	8	11	58	51	1.137	38	Qualification to Inter-Cities Fairs Cup first round
7	MSV Duisburg	34	13	10	11	69	58	1.190	36	

Source: www.dfb.de
Rules for classification: 1) points; 2) goal ratio.

=== DFB-Pokal ===
27 January 1968 1st Round	SSV Jahn Regensburg	1–4 (a.e.t.)	Bayern Munich	Regensburg
15:30CET	Braun 53'; Pöppel (penalty missed) 112'	Report	Müller 64', 109'; Eberl 108' (o.g.); Roth 115'	Stadium: Jahnstadion; Attendance: 25,000; Referee: Franz Heumann

22 February 1968 Round of 16	Bayern Munich	3–1	MSV Duisburg	Munich
20:00 CET	Ohlhauser 18'; Roth 41'; Müller 60' (pen.)	Report	Kowalski 53'	Stadium: Grünwalder Stadion; Attendance: 12,000; Referee: Alfred Ott

10 April 1968 Quarterfinals	Bayern Munich	2–1	1. FC Nürnberg	Munich
20:00 CET	Ohlhauser 20'; Müller 32'	Report	Brungs 2'	Stadium: Grünwalder Stadion; Attendance: 40,000; Referee: Willi Thier

15 May 1968 Seminfinals	VfL Bochum	2–1	Bayern Munich	Bochum
18:00 CET	Jansen 5'; Balte 56'	Report	Ohlhauser 90'	Stadium: Stadion an der Castroper Straße; Attendance: 40,000; Referee: Klaus Ohmsen

=== European Cup Winners' Cup ===
20 September 1967 1st Round	Bayern Munich	5–0	(Greece) Panathinaikos F.C.	Munich
20:00 CET	Müller 13' (pen.), 46'; Kupferschmidt 26'; Beckenbauer 32'; Jung 56'	Report; Report2		Stadium: Grünwalder Stadion; Attendance: 25,000; Referee: Ken Dagnall (England)

18 October 1967 1st Round	Panathinaikos F.C. (Greece)	1–2 (1–7 agg.)	Bayern Munich	Athens
	Kalaikidis 68'	Report; Report2	Müller 8'; Koulmann 89'	Stadium: Leoforos Alexandras Stadium; Attendance: 24,000; Referee: Jacques Colling (Luxembourg)

8 November 1967 Round of 16	Bayern Munich	6–2	(Portugal) Vitória F.C.	Munich
	Müller 8', 61', 89' (pen.); Brenninger 20'; Ohlhauser 25'; Nafziger 50'	Report; Report2	Pedras 7'; Tomé 80'	Stadium: Grünwalder Stadion; Attendance: 20,000; Referee: Kevin Howley (England)

14 November 1967 Round of 16	Vitória F.C. (Portugal)	1–1 (3–7 agg.)	Bayern Munich	Setúbal
CET	Pedras 68'	Report; Report2	Ohlhauser 83'	Stadium: Estádio do Bonfim; Attendance: 10,000; Referee: Roger Barde (France)

14 February 1968 Quarterfinals	Valencia CF (Spain)	1–1	Bayern Munich	Valencia
CET	Vilar 6'	Report; Report2	Mestre 77' (o.g.)	Stadium: Mestalla; Attendance: 60,000; Referee: Michel Kitabdjian (France)

13 March 1968 Quarterfinals	Bayern Munich	1–0 (2–1 agg.)	(Spain) Valencia CF	Munich
CET	Müller 3'	Report; Report2		Stadium: Grünwalder Stadion; Attendance: 23,000; Referee: Ken Dagnell (England)

1 May 1968 Semifinals	A.C. Milan (Italy)	2–0	Bayern Munich	Milan
CET	Sormani 51'; Prati 73'	Report; Report2		Stadium: San Siro; Attendance: 70,000; Referee: Salvador Garcia Campos (Portugal)

8 May 1968 Semifinals	Bayern Munich	0–0 (0–2 agg.)	(Italy) A.C. Milan	Munich
CET		Report; Report2		Stadium: Grünwalder Stadion; Attendance: 40,000; Referee: Gottfried Dienst (Switzerland)

== Squad information ==
=== Squad and statistics ===
No.	Pos	Nat	Player	Total		Bundesliga		Cup Winners' Cup		DFB-Pokal	
No.	Pos	Nat	Player	Apps	Goals	Apps	Goals	Apps	Goals	Apps	Goals
	GK	(Germany) GER	Sepp Maier	46	0	34	0	8	0	4	0
	DF	(Germany) GER	Franz Beckenbauer	39	5	28	4	7	1	4	0
	DF	(Germany) GER	Peter Kupferschmidt	44	1	33	0	8	1	3	0
	DF	(Germany) GER	Hans Nowak	19	1	14	1	3	0	2	0
	DF	(Germany) GER	Werner Olk (Captain)	43	0	32	0	8	0	3	0
	DF	(Germany) GER	Georg Schwarzenbeck	45	0	33	0	8	0	4	0
	MF	(Germany) GER	Karl Deuerling	1	0	1	0	0	0	0	0
	MF	(Germany) GER	Dieter Koulmann	34	6	28	5	3	1	3	0
	MF	(Germany) GER	Franz Roth	43	7	32	5	7	0	4	2
	MF	(Germany) GER	Horst Schauß	8	1	6	1	2	0	0	0
	MF	(Germany) GER	Helmut Schmidt	3	0	3	0	0	0	0	0
	MF	(Germany) GER	Herbert Stöckl	4	0	3	0	1	0	0	0
	FW	(Germany) GER	Dieter Brenninger	40	9	30	8	7	1	3	0
	FW	(Germany) GER	Gustav Jung	29	5	21	4	4	1	4	0
	FW	(Germany) GER	Gerd Müller	46	31	34	20	8	7	4	4
	FW	(Germany) GER	Rudolf Nafziger	31	1	25	0	5	1	1	0
	FW	(Germany) GER	Rainer Ohlhauser	43	24	32	19	7	2	4	3
	FW	(Germany) GER	Peter Werner	11	0	7	0	2	0	2	0

=== Transfers ===
==== In ====
No.	Pos.	Name	Age	Moving from	Type	Transfer Window	Contract ends	Transfer fee	Sources
	MF	Karl Deuerling	21	Unknown		Summer			
	FW	Gustav Jung	22	Unknown		Summer			
	MF	Herbert Stöckl	21	Unknown		Summer			
	MF	Helmut Schmidt	18	Unknown		Summer			
	MF	Horst Schauß	21	1. FC Saarbrücken		Summer			

==== Out ====
No.	Pos.	Name	Age	Moving to	Type	Transfer Window	Transfer fee	Sources
	MF	Jakob Drescher	28	FK Pirmasens		Summer		
	FW	Günther Nasdalla	21	Fortuna Düsseldorf		Summer		
	FW	Anton Vučkov	29	PEC Zwolle		Summer		
	MF	Rudolf Grosser	23	BSC Young Boys		Summer		
	DF	Adolf Kunstwadl	27	Unknown		Summer		
