= 1966–67 FC Bayern Munich season =

2nd season of Bayern Munich in the Bundesliga

Bayern Munich
1966–67 season
- Manager: Zlatko Čajkovski
- Bundesliga: 6th
- DFB-Pokal: Winners
- Cup Winners' Cup: Winners
- Top goalscorer: League: Gerd Müller (28); All: Gerd Müller (43)
Home colours	Away colours

The 1966–67 FC Bayern Munich season was the club's second season in Bundesliga.

== Review and events ==
The club won the European Cup Winners' Cup in an extra time final victory against Rangers. They also won the DFB-Pokal, defeating Hamburger SV 4–0 in the final.

== Match results ==
=== Legend ===
Win Draw Loss

=== Bundesliga ===
==== League fixtures and results ====
20 August 1966 1	Bayern Munich	1–2	Eintracht Frankfurt	Munich
16:00 CET	Müller 14'	Report	Grabowski 53' (pen.); Huberts 75'	Stadium: Grünwalder Stadion; Attendance: 32,000; Referee: Heinz Siebert

27 August 1966 2	Fortuna Düsseldorf	0–0	Bayern Munich	Düsseldorf
16:00 CET		Report		Stadium: Flinger Broich; Attendance: 45,000; Referee: Klaus Ohmsen

3 September 1966 3	Bayern Munich	0–0	Hannover 96	Munich
16:00 CET		Report		Stadium: Grünwalder Stadion; Attendance: 23,000; Referee: Gerd Henning

10 September 1966 4	Karlsruher SC	1–6	Bayern Munich	Karlsruhe
16:00 CET	C. Müller 69'	Report	Rigotti 9'; Müller 33', 82'; Roth 58'; Brenninger 71'; Nowak 88'	Stadium: Wildparkstadion; Attendance: 35,000; Referee: Fritz Seiler

17 September 1966 5	Bayern Munich	4–3	Borussia Mönchengladbach	Munich
16:00 CET	Olk 15'; Brenninger 39'; Müller 63', 68'	Report	Heynckes 31'; Wimmer 41'; Laumen 47'	Stadium: Grünwalder Stadion; Attendance: 27,000; Referee: Max Spinnler

24 September 1966 6	Rot-Weiß Essen	3–1	Bayern Munich	Essen
16:00 CET	Koslowski 12'; Hasebrink 78'; Simmet 85'	Report	Ohlhauser 62'	Stadium: Georg-Melches-Stadion; Attendance: 32,000; Referee: Ferdinand Biwersi

1 October 1966 7	Bayern Munich	0–1	1. FC Nürnberg	Munich
16:00 CET		Report	Greif 35'	Stadium: Grünwalder Stadion; Attendance: 38,000; Referee: Rudibert Jacobi

8 October 1966 8	Werder Bremen	4–1	Bayern Munich	Bremen
16:00 CET	Piontek 18'; Ferner 28'; Schweighöfer 74'; Schütz 90'	Report	Ohlhauser 60'	Stadium: Weserstadion; Attendance: 24,000; Referee: Gerd Hennig

15 October 1966 9	Bayern Munich	3–0	1860 Munich	Munich
16:00 CET	Müller 23', 62'; Ohlhauser 58'	Report		Stadium: Grünwalder Stadion; Attendance: 44,000; Referee: Kurt Tschenscher

22 October 1966 10	1. FC Köln	2–4	Bayern Munich	Cologne
16:00 CET	Magnusson 19'; Pott 68'	Report	Müller 3', 87'; Ohlhauser 32', 62'	Stadium: Müngersdorfer Stadion; Attendance: 32,000; Referee: Alfred Ott

29 October 1966 11	Bayern Munich	2–0	Eintracht Braunschweig	Munich
16:00 CET	Müller 43'; Koulmann 80'	Report		Stadium: Grünwalder Stadion; Attendance: 30,000; Referee: Hans-Joachim Weyland

5 November 1966 12	VfB Stuttgart	2–4	Bayern Munich	Stuttgart
15:00 CET	Larsson 28'; Sieloff 62'	Report	Brenninger 3', 51'; Ohlhauser 37', 80'	Stadium: Neckarstadion; Attendance: 35,000; Referee: Fritz Oswald

12 November 1966 13	Bayern Munich	2–1	Meidericher SV	Munich
15:00 CET	Ohlhauser 25'; Müller 28'	Report	Lotz 34'	Stadium: Grünwalder Stadion; Attendance: 22,000; Referee: Klaus Ohmsen

26 November 1966 14	FC Schalke 04	2–1	Bayern Munich	Gelsenkirchen
15:00 CET	Neuser 13'; Kraus 34'	Report	Müller 46'	Stadium: Glückauf-Kampfbahn; Attendance: 25,000; Referee: Ferdinand Biwersi

3 December 1966 15	Bayern Munich	5–0	1. FC Kaiserslautern	Munich
15:00 CET	Müller 1', 57', 69', 89' (pen.); Roth 67'	Report		Stadium: Grünwalder Stadion; Attendance: 16,000; Referee: Rolf Seekamp

10 December 1966 16	Hamburger SV	3–1	Bayern Munich	Hamburg
15:00 CET	Charly Dörfel 2', 6' (pen.); Seeler 63'	Report	Müller 24'	Stadium: Volksparkstadion; Attendance: 50,000; Referee: Karl Niemeyer

17 December 1966 17	Bayern Munich	1–0	Borussia Dortmund	Munich
15:00 CET	Müller 64'	Report		Stadium: Grünwalder Stadion; Attendance: 28,000; Referee: Edgar Deuschel

7 January 1967 18	Eintracht Frankfurt	2–1	Bayern Munich	Frankfurt
15:00 CET	Solz 77'; Bronnert 83'	Report	Ohlhauser 41'	Stadium: Waldstadion; Attendance: 40,000; Referee: Gerhard Schulenburg

21 January 1967 19	Bayern Munich	1–2	Fortuna Düsseldorf	Munich
15:00 CET	Müller 29'	Report	Gerhardt 7'; Straus 55'	Stadium: Grünwalder Stadion; Attendance: 16,000; Referee: Fritz Oswald

28 January 1967 20	Hannover 96	2–1	Bayern Munich	Hannover
15:00 CET	Breuer 16'; Straschitz 85'	Report	Müller 89'	Stadium: Niedersachsenstadion; Attendance: 31,000; Referee: Josef Hoffmann

11 February 1967 21	Bayern Munich	2–2	Karlsruher SC	Munich
16:00 CET	Müller 24'; Werner 43'	Report	Wild 26' (pen.); C. Müller 62'	Stadium: Grünwalder Stadion; Attendance: 15,000; Referee: Günther Baumgärtel

18 February 1967 22	Borussia Mönchengladbach	1–2	Bayern Munich	Mönchengladbach
16:00 CET	Schwarzenbeck 74' (o.g.)	Report	Roth 3'; Ohlhauser 70'	Stadium: Bökelbergstadion; Attendance: 35,000; Referee: Alfred Ott

25 February 1967 23	Bayern Munich	4–1	Rot-Weiß Essen	Munich
16:00 CET	Müller 18', 36', 80'; Rigotti 74'	Report	Glinka 33'	Stadium: Grünwalder Stadion; Attendance: 20,000; Referee: Günter Linn

2 April 1966 24	1. FC Nürnberg	0–1	Bayern Munich	Nuremberg
16:00 CET		Report	Roth 68'	Stadium: Städtisches Stadion; Attendance: 61,000; Referee: Kurt Tschenscher

11 March 1967 25	Bayern Munich	1–0	Werder Bremen	Munich
16:00 CET	Müller 82' (pen.)	Report		Stadium: Grünwalder Stadion; Attendance: 13,000; Referee: Hans Radermacher

18 March 1967 26	1860 Munich	1–0	Bayern Munich	Munich
16:00 CET	Zeiser 19'	Report		Stadium: Grünwalder Stadion; Attendance: 40,000; Referee: Willi Thier

1 April 1967 27	Bayern Munich	2–0	1. FC Köln	Munich
16:00 CET	Müller 43'; Roth 89'	Report		Stadium: Grünwalder Stadion; Attendance: 22,000; Referee: Helmut Fritz

15 April 1967 28	Eintracht Braunschweig	5–2	Bayern Munich	Braunschweig
16:00 CET	Gerwien 4'; Ulsaß 23'; Saborowski 30', 41'; Moll 68'	Report	Müller 73' (pen.); Brenninger 78'	Stadium: Eintracht-Stadion; Attendance: 38,000; Referee: Gerd Siepe

22 April 1967 29	Bayern Munich	1–1	VfB Stuttgart	Munich
16:00 CET	Müller 46'	Report	Larsson 77'	Stadium: Grünwalder Stadion; Attendance: 12,000; Referee: Kurt Tschenscher

29 April 1967 30	Meidericher SV	0–0	Bayern Munich	Duisburg
16:00 CET		Report		Stadium: Wedaustadion; Attendance: 20,000; Referee: Günter Linn

13 May 1967 31	Bayern Munich	5–0	FC Schalke 04	Munich
16:00 CET	Kupferschmidt 43'; Brenninger 52' (pen.); Ohlhauser 67', 83'; Roth 71'	Report		Stadium: Grünwalder Stadion; Attendance: 10,000; Referee: Fritz Oswald

20 May 1967 32	1. FC Kaiserslautern	1–0	Bayern Munich	Kaiserslautern
16:00 CET	Geisert 25'	Report		Stadium: Betzenbergstadion; Attendance: 30,000; Referee: Karl-Heinz Mailand

27 May 1967 33	Bayern Munich	3–1	Hamburger SV	Munich
16:00 CET	Koulmann 28'; Roth 80'; Brenninger 86'	Report	Charly Dörfel 61'	Stadium: Grünwalder Stadion; Attendance: 12,000; Referee: Josef Hoffmann

3 June 1967 34	Borussia Dortmund	4–0	Bayern Munich	Dortmund
16:00 CET	Emmerich 15', 88'; Wosab 35', 75'	Report		Stadium: Stadion Rote Erde; Attendance: 30,000; Referee: Diedrich Basedow

==== League standings ====
Pos	Team	Pld	W	D	L	GF	GA	GR	Pts	Qualification or relegation
4	Eintracht Frankfurt	34	15	9	10	66	49	1.347	39	Qualification to Inter-Cities Fairs Cup first round
5	1. FC Kaiserslautern	34	13	12	9	43	42	1.024	38	
6	Bayern Munich	34	16	5	13	62	47	1.319	37	Qualification to Cup Winners' Cup first round (Note: Bayern Munich won the 1966–67 European Cup Winners' Cup and thereby automatically qualified as defending champions. As Bayern also won the 1966–67 DFB-Pokal, runners-up Hamburger SV were given the European spot reserved for the domestic cup winners.)
7	1. FC Köln	34	14	9	11	48	48	1.000	37	Qualification to Inter-Cities Fairs Cup first round
8	Borussia Mönchengladbach	34	12	10	12	70	49	1.429	34	

Source: www.dfb.de
Rules for classification: 1) points; 2) goal ratio.

=== DFB-Pokal ===
14 January 1967 1st Round	Hertha BSC	2–3 (a.e.t.)	Bayern Munich	Berlin
15:00 CET	Ipta 63', 94'	Report	Brenninger 24'; Müller 110', 113'	Stadium: Olympic Stadium; Attendance: 35,000; Referee: Wolfgang Link (Kiel)

3 February 1967 Round of 16	SpVgg Erkenschwick	1–3	Bayern Munich	Oer-Erkenschwick
14:30 CET	Sochacki 66' (pen.)	Report	Müller 62', 69'; Ohlhauser 72'	Stadium: Stimbergstadion; Attendance: 23,000; Referee: Schäfer (Buchholz)

25 March 1967 Quarterfinal	FC Schalke 04	2–3	Bayern Munich	Gelsenkirchen
16:00 CET	Herrmann 29'; Neuser 76'	Report	Müller 15'; Ohlhauser 39', 50'	Stadium: Glückauf-Kampfbahn; Attendance: 26,000; Referee: Klaus Ohmsen (Hamburg)

6 May 1967 Semifinal	Bayern Munich	3–1	1860 Munich	Munich
16:00 CET	Ohlhauser 63', 75'; Kupferschmidt 65'	Report	Bründl 78'	Stadium: Grünwalder Stadion; Attendance: 42,000; Referee: Rudolf Kreitlein (Stuttgart)

10 June 1967 Final	Bayern Munich	4–0	Hamburger SV	Stuttgart
16:00 CET	Müller 23', 76'; Ohlhauser 72'; Brenninger 85' (pen.)	Report		Stadium: Neckarstadion; Attendance: 67,000; Referee: Karl Niemeyer (Bad Godesberg)

=== European Cup Winners' Cup ===
28 September 1966 1st Round	TJ Tatran Prešov (Czech Republic)	1–1	(West Germany) Bayern Munich	Prešov
	Caban 13'	Report; Report2	Roth 21'	Stadium: Tatran Stadium; Attendance: 5,000; Referee: Waclaw Majdan (Poland)

5 October 1966 1st Round	Bayern Munich (West Germany)	3–2 (4–3 agg.)	(Czech Republic) TJ Tatran Prešov	Munich
	Brenninger 32'; Müller 70', 71'	Report; Report2	Pavlovic 55', 83'	Stadium: Grünwalder Stadion; Attendance: 15,000; Referee: Antonio Sbardella (Italy)

9 November 1966 Round of 16	Shamrock Rovers (Republic of Ireland)	1–1	(West Germany) Bayern Munich	Dublin
	Dixon 60'	Report; Report2	Koulmann 17'	Stadium: Dalymount Park; Attendance: 23,000; Referee: Laurens van Ravens (Netherlands)

23 November 1966 Round of 16	Bayern Munich (West Germany)	3–2 (4–3 agg.)	(Republic of Ireland) Shamrock Rovers	Munich
	Brenninger 4'; Ohlhauser 13'; Müller 83'	Report; Report2	Gilbert 56'; Tuohy 59'	Stadium: Grünwalder Stadion; Attendance: 10,000; Referee: Konstantin Zečević (Yugoslavia)

15 February 1967 Quarterfinals	SK Rapid Wien (Austria)	1–0	(West Germany) Bayern Munich	Vienna
	Starek 48'	Report; Report2		Stadium: Ernst Happel Stadium; Attendance: 40,200; Referee: Joseph Hannet (Belgium)

8 March 1967 Quarterfinals	Bayern Munich (West Germany)	2–0 (a.e.t.) (2–1 agg.)	(Austria) SK Rapid Wien	Munich
	Ohlhauser 59'; Müller 106'	Report; Report2	Seitl (red card) 62'	Stadium: Grünwalder Stadion; Attendance: 38,000; Referee: Tiny Wharton (Scotland)

11 April 1967 Semifinals	Bayern Munich (West Germany)	2–0	(Belgium) Standard Liège	Munich
	Müller 2'; Kupferschmidt 9'	Report; Report2		Stadium: Grünwalder Stadion; Attendance: 38,000; Referee: István Zsolt (Hungary)

26 April 1967 Semifinals	Standard Liège (Belgium)	1–3 (1–5 agg.)	(West Germany) Bayern Munich	Liège
	Galić 32'	Report; Report2	Müller 27', 73', 83'	Stadium: Stade Maurice Dufrasne; Attendance: 38,000; Referee: Bertil Lööw (Sweden)

31 May 1967 Final	Bayern Munich (West Germany)	1–0 (a.e.t.)	(Scotland) Rangers	Nuremberg
16:00 CET	Roth 109'	Report; Report2		Stadium: Städtisches Stadion; Attendance: 69,480; Referee: Concetto Lo Bello (Italy)

=== Pre-season test game ===
3 August 1966 Pre-season test	Basel (Switzerland)	3 – 2	(West Germany) Bayern Munich	St. Jakob Stadium, Basel
20:00	Benthaus 39' (1:2); Moscatelli 51' (2:2); Ramseier 79' (3:2)	FC Basel Summary	12' (0:1) Ohlhauser; 30' (0:2) Nafziger	Attendance: 3,500; Referee: (Switzerland) Pius Kamber Zürich

== Squad information ==
=== Squad and statistics ===
No.	Pos	Nat	Player	Total		Bundesliga		Cup Winners' Cup		DFB-Pokal	
No.	Pos	Nat	Player	Apps	Goals	Apps	Goals	Apps	Goals	Apps	Goals
	GK	(Germany) GER	Sepp Maier	48	0	34	0	9	0	5	0
	DF	(Germany) GER	Franz Beckenbauer	47	0	33	0	9	0	5	0
	DF	(Germany) GER	Peter Kupferschmidt	44	3	32	1	8	1	4	1
	DF	(Germany) GER	Hans Nowak	24	1	17	1	4	0	3	0
	DF	(Germany) GER	Werner Olk (Captain)	46	1	32	1	9	0	5	0
	DF	(Germany) GER	Georg Schwarzenbeck	28	0	21	0	2	0	5	0
	DF	(Germany) GER	Adolf Kunstwadl	1	0	0	0	1	0	0	0
	MF	(Germany) GER	Karl Borutta	2	0	2	0	0	0	0	0
	MF	(Germany) GER	Jakob Drescher	1	0	1	0	0	0	0	0
	MF	(Germany) GER	Rudolf Grosser	2	0	1	0	0	0	1	0
	MF	(Germany) GER	Dieter Koulmann	34	1	22	0	8	1	4	0
	MF	(Germany) GER	Hans Rigotti	22	2	18	2	3	0	1	0
	MF	(Germany) GER	Franz Roth	32	9	20	7	7	2	5	0
	MF	(Germany) GER	Klaus Walleitner	2	0	2	0	0	0	0	0
	FW	(Germany) GER	Dieter Brenninger	44	11	30	7	9	2	5	2
	FW	(Germany) GER	Gerd Müller	45	43	32	28	9	8	4	7
	FW	(Germany) GER	Rudolf Nafziger	44	0	32	0	9	0	3	0
	FW	(Germany) GER	Günther Nasdalla	1	0	1	0	0	0	0	0
	FW	(Germany) GER	Rainer Ohlhauser	45	20	31	12	9	2	5	6
	FW	(Germany) GER	Peter Werner	16	1	13	1	3	0	0	0

=== Transfers ===
==== In ====
No.	Pos.	Name	Age	Moving from	Type	Transfer Window	Contract ends	Transfer fee	Sources
	FW	Klaus Walleitner	18	TSV 1860 Rosenheim	Transfer	Summer			
	MF	Franz Roth	20	SpVgg Kaufbeuren	Transfer	Summer			
	FW	Günther Nasdalla	20	FC Viktoria Köln 1904	Transfer	Summer			
	DF	Georg Schwarzenbeck	18	Youth system	Promotion	Summer			

==== Out ====
No.	Pos.	Name	Age	Moving to	Type	Transfer Window	Transfer fee	Sources
	MF	Karl Borutta	30	Unknown		Winter		
	DF	Hubert Windsperger	21	SC Preußen Münster	Transfer	Summer		
	FW	Kurt Kroiß	27	Unknown		Summer		
	FW	Karl Schneider	24	TSV Schwaben Augsburg	Transfer	Summer		
