= 1965–66 FC Bayern Munich season =

1st season of Bayern Munich in the Bundesliga

Bayern Munich
1965–66 season
- Manager: Zlatko Čajkovski
- Bundesliga: 3rd
- DFB-Pokal: Winners
- Top goalscorer: League: Gerd Müller (15); All: Gerd Müller (16)
Home colours	Away colours

The 1965–66 FC Bayern Munich season was the club's first season in Bundesliga, following promotion from the Regionalliga Süd. In addition to the league, Bayern also competed in the DFB-Pokal, winning the domestic cup for the second time in the club's history.

== Review and events ==
Bayern Munich signed Ramiro Blacut, Dieter Danzberg, Günter Kaussen, Fritz Kosar, Kurt Kroiß, Hans Nowak, Hans Rigotti, Anton Vučkov and Hubert Windsperger. Otto Jaworski, Manfred Schwalm and Norbert Wodarzik left the club.

== Match results ==
=== Legend ===
Win Draw Loss

=== Bundesliga ===
==== League fixtures and results ====
14 August 1965 1	1860 Munich	1–0	Bayern Munich	Munich
16:00 CET	Konietzka 1'	Report		Stadium: Grünwalder Stadion; Attendance: 44,000; Referee: Alfred Ott

21 August 1965 2	Bayern Munich	2–0	Eintracht Frankfurt	Munich
16:00 CET	Ohlhauser 24'; Nafziger 87'	Report		Stadium: Grünwalder Stadion; Attendance: 30,000; Referee: Berthold Schmidt

28 August 1965 3	Eintracht Braunschweig	2–4	Bayern Munich	Braunschweig
16:00 CET	Ulsaß 63' (pen.), 88'	Report	Ohlhauser 24'; Müller 35', 55'; Drescher 73'	Stadium: Eintracht-Stadion; Attendance: 28,000; Referee: Werner Treichel

4 September 1965 4	Bayern Munich	6–0	Borussia Neunkirchen	Munich
16:00 CET	Ohlhauser 7', 50'; Müller 35', 54'; Brenninger 49'; Nafziger 64'	Report		Stadium: Grünwalder Stadion; Attendance: 31,000; Referee: Hans-Joachim Weyland

11 September 1965 5	Tasmania Berlin	0–2	Bayern Munich	Berlin
16:00 CET		Report	Brenninger 23'; Müller 73'	Stadium: Olympic Stadium; Attendance: 40,000; Referee: Walter Horstmann

18 September 1965 6	Bayern Munich	5–1	Karlsruher SC	Munich
16:00 CET	Beckenbauer 12'; Müller 17'; Brenninger 59'; Ohlhauser 64'; Nafziger 75'	Report	Dürrschnabel 40'	Stadium: Grünwalder Stadion; Attendance: 35,000; Referee: Johannes Malka

2 October 1965 7	Borussia Mönchengladbach	1–2	Bayern Munich	Mönchengladbach
15:00 CET	Netzer 33'	Report	Ohlhauser 43'; Müller 78'	Stadium: Bökelbergstadion; Attendance: 30,000; Referee: Ewald Regely

16 October 1965 8	Bayern Munich	0–2	Borussia Dortmund	Munich
16:00 CET	Beckenbauer (penalty missed) 58'	Report	Wosab 38', 83'	Stadium: Grünwalder Stadion; Attendance: 45,000; Referee: Erwin Sturm

20 October 1965 9	Hamburger SV	0–4	Bayern Munich	Hamburg
20:00 CET		Report	Nafziger 9', 80'; Drescher 19'; Brenninger 82'	Stadium: Volksparkstadion; Attendance: 71,000; Referee: Gerd Henning

23 October 1965 10	FC Schalke 04	1–1	Bayern Munich	Gelsenkirchen
16:00 CET	Kreuz 64'	Report	Koulmann 5'	Stadium: Glückauf-Kampfbahn; Attendance: 40,000; Referee: Horst Herden

30 October 1965 11	Bayern Munich	0–0	1. FC Nürnberg	Munich
16:00 CET		Report		Stadium: Grünwalder Stadion; Attendance: 40,000; Referee: Kurt Handwerker

6 November 1965 12	Hannover 96	3–4	Bayern Munich	Hannover
14:30 CET	Mülhausen 14', 45' (pen.); Nix 59'	Report	Ohlhauser 32'; Brenninger 48'; Müller 54', 58'	Stadium: Niedersachsenstadion; Attendance: 60,000; Referee: Berthold Schmidt

20 November 1965 13	Bayern Munich	3–0	1. FC Kaiserslautern	Munich
15:00 CET	Müller 38'; Ohlhauser 68'; Brenninger 78'	Report		Stadium: Grünwalder Stadion; Attendance: 24,000; Referee: Willi Thier

27 November 1965 14	VfB Stuttgart	0–1	Bayern Munich	Stuttgart
15:00 CET		Report	Menne 37' (o.g.)	Stadium: Neckarstadion; Attendance: 32,000; Referee: Gerhard Schulenburg

4 December 1965 15	Bayern Munich	3–0	Meidericher SV	Munich
15:00 CET	Brenninger 10', 55'; Müller 86'	Report		Stadium: Grünwalder Stadion; Attendance: 18,000; Referee: Oswald Fritz

11 December 1965 16	1. FC Köln	6–1	Bayern Munich	Cologne
15:00 CET	Borutta 16' (o.g.); Hornig 24', 63'; Pott 30' (pen.); Müller 48'; Thielen 82'	Report	Beckenbauer 43' (pen.)	Stadium: Müngersdorfer Stadion; Attendance: 45,000; Referee: Helmut Fritz

18 December 1965 17	Bayern Munich	3–1	Werder Bremen	Munich
15:00 CET	Ohlhauser 40'; Koulmann 48'; Beckenbauer 90' (pen.)	Report	Piontek 24'	Stadium: Grünwalder Stadion; Attendance: 20,000; Referee: Willi Thier

8 January 1966 18	Bayern Munich	3–0	1860 Munich	Munich
15:00 CET	Brenninger 59'; Ohlhauser 76'; Nafziger 84'	Report		Stadium: Grünwalder Stadion; Attendance: 40,000; Referee: Kurt Tschenscher

15 January 1966 19	Eintracht Frankfurt	0–0	Bayern Munich	Frankfurt
15:00 CET		Report		Stadium: Waldstadion; Attendance: 66,000; Referee: Gerd Hennig

29 January 1966 20	Bayern Munich	2–2	Eintracht Braunschweig	Munich
15:00 CET	Drescher 23'; Müller 48'	Report	Maas 36'; Krafczyk 78'	Stadium: Grünwalder Stadion; Attendance: 21,000; Referee: Johannes Malka

5 February 1966 21	Borussia Neunkirchen	0–4	Bayern Munich	Neunkirchen
14:30 CET		Report	Brenninger 21'; Müller 27'; Koulmann 33'; Nafziger 48'	Stadium: Ellenfeldstadion; Attendance: 20,000; Referee: Günther Baumgärtel

12 February 1966 22	Bayern Munich	2–1	Tasmania Berlin	Munich
15:00 CET	Nafziger 27'; Vuckov 59'	Report	Rosenfeldt 60'	Stadium: Grünwalder Stadion; Attendance: 18,000; Referee: Karl-Heinz Fork

26 February 1966 23	Karlsruher SC	1–0	Bayern Munich	Karlsruhe
15:00 CET	Wild 72' (pen.)	Report		Stadium: Wildparkstadion; Attendance: 50,000; Referee: Rolf Seekamp

5 March 1966 24	Bayern Munich	5–2	Borussia Mönchengladbach	Munich
16:00 CET	Drescher 11'; Nowak 38', 43'; Brenninger 48'; Koulmann 57'	Report	Netzer 12'; Milder 45' (pen.)	Stadium: Grünwalder Stadion; Attendance: 15,000; Referee: Klaus Ohmsen

12 March 1966 25	Borussia Dortmund	3–0	Bayern Munich	Dortmund
16:00 CET	Emmerich 46', 66'; Held 83'	Report		Stadium: Stadion Rote Erde; Attendance: 34,000; Referee: Horst Herden

19 March 1966 26	Bayern Munich	3–0	Hamburger SV	Munich
16:00 CET	Ohlhauser 9'; Peter Werner 63'; Nafziger 90'	Report		Stadium: Grünwalder Stadion; Attendance: 28,000; Referee: Hans-Joachim Weyland

26 March 1966 27	Bayern Munich	1–0	FC Schalke 04	Munich
16:00 CET	Werner 33'	Report		Stadium: Grünwalder Stadion; Attendance: 16,000; Referee: Werner Treichel

2 April 1966 28	1. FC Nürnberg	2–2	Bayern Munich	Nuremberg
16:00 CET	Strehl 8' (pen.); Brungs 83'	Report	Brenninger 36' (pen.); Koulmann 76'	Stadium: Städtisches Stadion; Attendance: 60,000; Referee: Rudibert Jacobi

16 April 1966 29	Bayern Munich	3–1	Hannover 96	Munich
16:00 CET	Ohlhauser 13'; Beckenbauer 72'; Müller 77'	Report	Siemensmeyer 43'	Stadium: Grünwalder Stadion; Attendance: 16,000; Referee: Günther Baumgärtel

23 April 1966 30	1. FC Kaiserslautern	1–2	Bayern Munich	Kaiserslautern
16:00 CET	Rummel 54'	Report	Werner 38'; Nafziger 61'	Stadium: Betzenbergstadion; Attendance: 28,000; Referee: Horst Herden

30 April 1966 31	Bayern Munich	0–1	VfB Stuttgart	Munich
16:00 CET		Report	Sieloff 18' (pen.)	Stadium: Grünwalder Stadion; Attendance: 24,000; Referee: Ferdinand Biwersi

14 May 1966 32	Meidericher SV	1–1	Bayern Munich	Duisburg
16:00 CET	Mielke 37'	Report	Ohlhauser 70'	Stadium: Wedaustadion; Attendance: 22,000; Referee: Gerhard Schulenburg

21 May 1966 33	Bayern Munich	1–4	1. FC Köln	Munich
16:00 CET	Grosser 74'	Report	Hornig 3'; Overath 22'; Beckenbauer 30' (o.g.); Müller 77'	Stadium: Grünwalder Stadion; Attendance: 28,000; Referee: Werner Treichel

28 May 1966 34	Werder Bremen	1–1	Bayern Munich	Bremen
16:00 CET	Schütz 19'	Report	Werner 14'	Stadium: Weserstadion; Attendance: 20,000; Referee: Willi Thier

==== League standings ====
Pos	Team	Pld	W	D	L	GF	GA	GR	Pts	Qualification or relegation
1	1860 Munich (C)	34	20	10	4	80	40	2.000	50	Qualification to European Cup first round
2	Borussia Dortmund	34	19	9	6	70	36	1.944	47	Qualification to Cup Winners' Cup second round (Note: Borussia Dortmund won the 1965–66 European Cup Winners' Cup and thereby automatically qualified as defending champions.)
3	Bayern Munich	34	20	7	7	71	38	1.868	47	Qualification to Cup Winners' Cup first round
4	Werder Bremen	34	21	3	10	76	40	1.900	45	
5	1. FC Köln	34	19	6	9	74	41	1.805	44	

Rules for classification: 1) points; 2) goal ratio.
(C) Champions

=== DFB-Pokal ===
2 January 1966 Qualification	Bayern Munich	2–0	Borussia Dortmund	Munich
15:00	Ohlhauser 1'; Müller 40'	Report		Stadium: Grünwalder Stadion; Attendance: 30.000; Referee: Edgar Deuschel

22 January 1966 1st Rnd	Bayern Munich	1–0	Eintracht Braunschweig	Munich
15:00	Ohlhauser 32'	Report		Stadium: Grünwalder Stadion; Attendance: 10.000; Referee: Wilfried Hilker (Bochum)

19 March 1966 R16	Bayern Munich	2–0	1. FC Köln	Munich
20:00	Brenninger 10'; Ohlhauser 65'; Beckenbauer (penalty missed)	Report		Stadium: Grünwalder Stadion; Attendance: 38.000; Referee: Gerhard Schulenburg (Hamburg)

19 April 1966 QF	Hamburger SV	1–2	Bayern Munich	Hamburg
19:00	Kurbjuhn 27'	Report	Dieckmann 10' (o.g.); Brenninger 58'	Attendance: 41.000; Referee: Helmut Fritz (Ludwigshafen)

18 May 1966 SF	1. FC Nürnberg	1–2 (a.e.t.)	Bayern Munich	Nuremberg
19:00	Brungs 29'	Report	Ohlhauser 29'; Nowak 98'	Stadium: Städtisches Stadion; Attendance: 58.000; Referee: Kurt Handwerker (Ketsch)

4 June 1966 Final	Bayern Munich	4–2	MSV Duisburg	Frankfurt
16:00	Ohlhauser 31'; Brenninger 56', 77'; Beckenbauer 82'	Report	Mielke 28'; Heidemann 72'	Stadium: Waldstadion; Attendance: 62.000; Referee: Gerhard Schulenburg (Hamburg)

== Squad information ==
=== Squad and statistics ===
As of 30 August 2012

No.	Pos	Nat	Player	Total		Bundesliga		DFB-Pokal	
No.	Pos	Nat	Player	Apps	Goals	Apps	Goals	Apps	Goals
	GK	(Germany) GER	Fritz Kosar	3	0	3	0	0	0
	GK	(Germany) GER	Sepp Maier	33	0	31	0	2	0
	DF	(Germany) GER	Franz Beckenbauer	35	4	33	4	2	0
	DF	(Germany) GER	Dieter Danzberg	2	0	2	0	0	0
	DF	(Germany) GER	Adolf Kunstwadl	2	0	2	0	0	0
	DF	(Germany) GER	Peter Kupferschmidt	34	0	32	0	2	0
	DF	(Germany) GER	Hans Nowak	6	2	6	2	0	0
	DF	(Germany) GER	Werner Olk	29	0	28	0	1	0
	DF	(Germany) GER	Hubert Windsperger	1	0	1	0	0	0
	MF	(Germany) GER	Karl Borutta	29	0	27	0	2	0
	MF	(Germany) GER	Jakob Drescher	30	4	28	4	2	0
	MF	(Germany) GER	Rudolf Grosser	3	1	3	1	0	0
	MF	(Germany) GER	Dieter Koulmann	27	5	27	5	0	0
	MF	(Germany) GER	Hans Rigotti	17	0	15	0	2	0
	FW	(Germany) GER	Dieter Brenninger	33	12	31	12	2	0
	FW	(Germany) GER	Kurt Kroiß	2	0	2	0	0	0
	FW	(Germany) GER	Gerd Müller	35	15	33	14	2	1
	FW	(Germany) GER	Rudolf Nafziger	34	10	32	10	2	0
	FW	(Germany) GER	Rainer Ohlhauser	31	15	29	13	2	2
	FW	(Socialist Federal Republic of Yugoslavia) YUG	Anton Vučkov	1	1	1	1	0	0
	FW	(Germany) GER	Peter Werner	8	4	8	4	0	0

=== Transfers ===
==== In ====
No.	Pos.	Name	Age	Moving from	Type	Transfer Window	Contract ends	Transfer fee	Sources
	FW	Ramiro Blacut	21	Ferro Carril Oeste		Summer			
	DF	Dieter Danzberg	24	Meidericher SV		Summer			
	FW	Günter Kaussen	19			Summer			
	GK	Fritz Kosar	20			Summer			
	FW	Kurt Kroiß	26			Summer			
	DF	Hans Nowak	27	FC Schalke 04		Summer			
	MF	Hans Rigotti	18	Youth system		Summer			
	FW	Anton Vučkov	27	NK Trešnjevka		Summer			
	DF	Hubert Windsperger	20			Summer			

==== Out ====
No.	Pos.	Name	Age	Moving to	Type	Transfer Window	Transfer fee	Sources
	MF	Otto Jaworski	24	TSC Zweibrücken		Summer		
	FW	Manfred Schwalm	26			Summer		
	DF	Norbert Wodarzik	29	TSV Schwaben Augsburg		Summer		
