= 1967 European Cup Winners' Cup final =

- Match programme cover
- Event: 1966–67 European Cup Winners' Cup
Bayern Munich	Rangers
(West Germany)	(Scotland)
1	0
- After extra time
- Date: 31 May 1967
- Venue: Städtisches Stadion, Nuremberg
- Referee: Concetto Lo Bello (Italy)
- Attendance: 69,480

The 1967 European Cup Winners' Cup Final was a football match contested between Bayern Munich of West Germany and Rangers of Scotland. The match took place at the Städtisches Stadion in Nuremberg, West Germany on 31 May 1967 in front of a crowd of 69,480. It was the final match of the 1966–67 European Cup Winners' Cup competition and the seventh European Cup Winners' Cup final. The competition was one of three football competitions that was run by UEFA at that time. Both teams had to go through four qualifying rounds before reaching the final.

The final finished 0–0 over 90 minutes. Rangers had a goal disallowed during regulation time. In extra time, Bayern scored through Franz Roth and the match ended 1–0. It was Bayern's first European trophy.

== Route to the final ==
(West Germany) Bayern Munich					(Scotland) Rangers			
Opponent	Agg.	1st leg	2nd leg		Opponent	Agg.	1st leg	2nd leg
(Czechoslovakia) Tatran Prešov	4–3	1–1 (A)	3–2 (H)	First round	(Northern Ireland) Glentoran	5–1	1–1 (A)	4–0 (H)
(Republic of Ireland) Shamrock Rovers	4–3	1–1 (A)	3–2 (H)	Second round	(West Germany) Borussia Dortmund	2–1	2–1 (H)	0–0 (A)
(Austria) Rapid Wien	2–1	0–1 (A)	2–0 (aet) (H)	Quarter-finals	(Spain) Zaragoza	2–2 (c)	2–0 (H)	0–2 (aet) (A)
(Belgium) Standard Liège	5–1	2–0 (H)	3–1 (A)	Semi-finals	(Bulgaria) Slavia Sofia	2–0	1–0 (A)	1–0 (H)

=== Bayern Munich ===
Bayern Munich defeated TJ Tatran Presov and Shamrock Rovers 4-3 on aggregate in the first and second rounds. Munich won 2-1 after extra time against Rapid Wien in the quarter-final before winning the semi-final against Standard liege 5-1 on aggregate to reach the final in Nuremberg.

=== Rangers ===
Rangers began their campaign by defeating Glentoran 5-1 on aggregate and were then drawn to play the defending champions Borussia Dortmund in the second round. Rangers won the tie 2-1 on aggregate. In the quarter-final Rangers defeated Zaragoza from Spain on the toss of a coin after the tie was drawn 2-2 after both legs and extra time had been played. Rangers reached their second European final after beating Slavia Sofia 2-0 on aggregate in the semi-final.

== Match ==
=== Background ===
This was the first European final Bayern Munich had contested and it was played in Nuremberg, Germany. Although several thousand Scots travelled for the match Bayern had the home support advantage. Bayern Munich's team contained arguably some of the best German footballers of all time including Sepp Maier, Franz Beckenbauer and Gerd Müller.

Rangers were the first British club to play in a European final in 1961. Six days before the 1967 final Rangers rivals Celtic had won the European Cup in Lisbon and it was the first time two teams from the same city had contested the two main European finals. This achievement put additional pressure on Rangers. Rangers striker Alex Willoughby was left out of the team in favour of defender Roger Hynd, who had been promoted to the first team on account of his goalscoring feats in Rangers' second XI. Willoughby had been a prolific scorer for Rangers in the preceding months. Rangers' cause was not helped by their chairman John Lawrence describing Rangers' forward line as 'makeshift' (it included three half-backs).

=== Summary ===
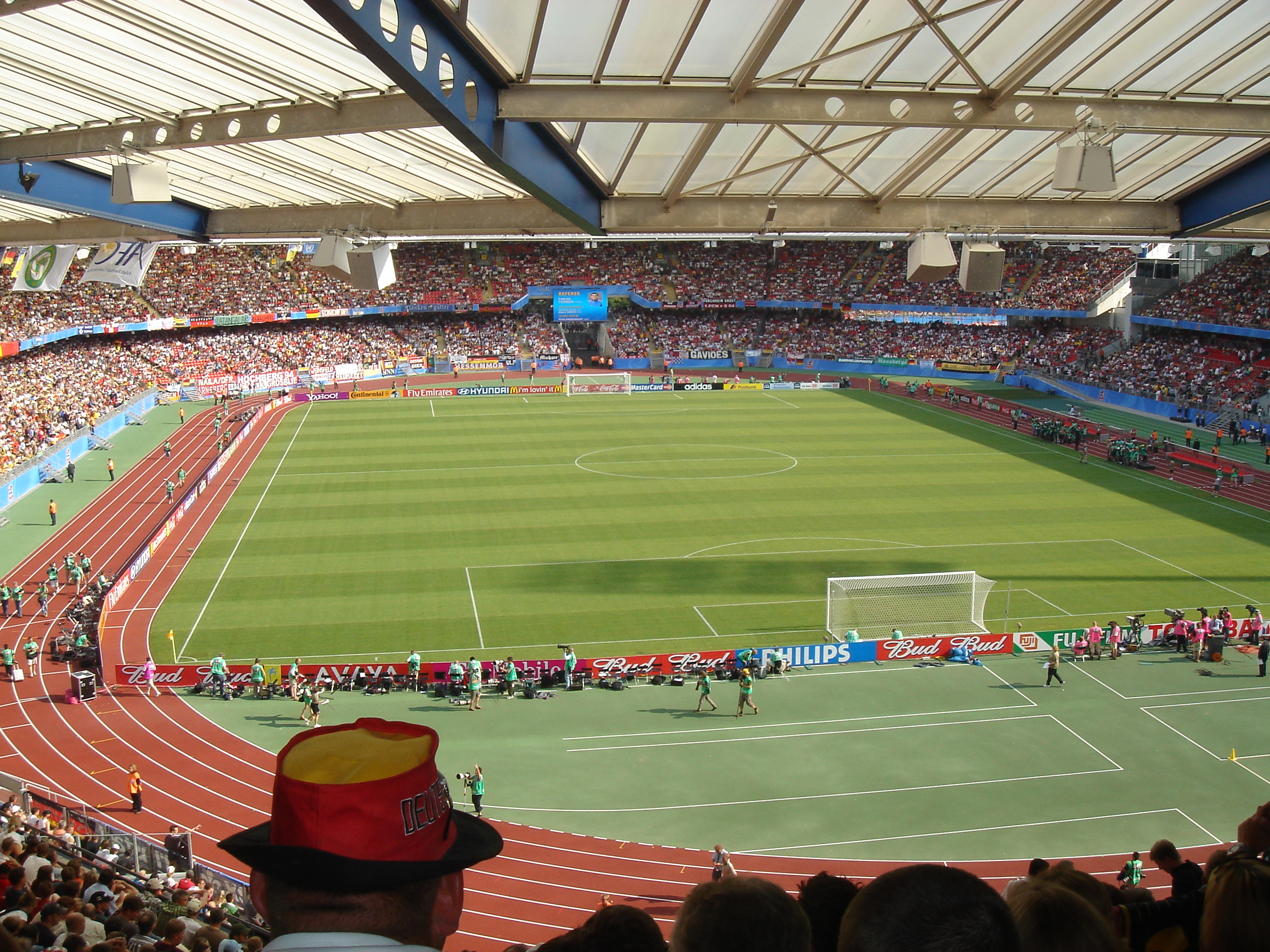
The final was held in the Städtisches Stadion, Nuremberg

Both teams' strength lay in their defence. Rangers dominated the first half while Bayern played stronger in the second. Roger Hynd who was traditionally a central defender played as a striker for Rangers and had a goal disallowed during the 90 minutes. Hynd also missed a good chance after being set up by Dave Smith. The match was goalless after 90 minutes and went into extra time. Bayern scored the only goal of the game when Franz Roth took advantage of hesitancy in the Rangers defence and lobbed Norrie Martin.

=== Match details ===
31 May 1967
19:30

Bayern Munich (West Germany)	1–0 (a.e.t.)	(Scotland) Rangers
Roth 109'	Report

Städtisches Stadion, Nuremberg
Attendance: 69,480
Referee: Concetto Lo Bello (Italy)

Bayern Munich	Rangers

GK	1	(West Germany) Sepp Maier
CB	2	(West Germany) Peter Kupferschmidt
LB	3	(West Germany) Werner Olk (c)
MF	4	(West Germany) Franz Roth
CB	5	(West Germany) Franz Beckenbauer
RB	6	(West Germany) Hans Nowak
RW	7	(West Germany) Rudolf Nafziger
CF	8	(West Germany) Rainer Ohlhauser
CF	9	(West Germany) Gerd Müller
MF	10	(West Germany) Dieter Koulmann
LW	11	(West Germany) Dieter Brenninger
Manager:
(Socialist Federal Republic of Yugoslavia) Zlatko Čajkovski

GK	1	(Scotland) Norrie Martin
RB	2	(Denmark) Kai Johansen
LB	3	(Scotland) David Provan
CB	4	(Scotland) Sandy Jardine
CB	5	(Scotland) Ronnie McKinnon
CM	6	(Scotland) John Greig (c)
RM	7	(Scotland) Willie Henderson
CM	8	(Scotland) Dave Smith
FW	9	(Scotland) Roger Hynd
FW	10	(Scotland) Alex Smith
LM	11	(Scotland) Willie Johnston
Manager:
(Scotland) Scot Symon

== See also ==
- 1967 European Cup Final
- 1967 Inter-Cities Fairs Cup Final
- FC Bayern Munich in international football competitions
- Rangers F.C. in European football
