= List of FC Bayern Munich seasons =

This is a list of the seasons played by Bayern Munich from 1905 when the club first entered a league competition to the most recent seasons. The club's achievements in all major national and international competitions as well as the top scorers are listed. Top scorers in bold were also top scorers of Bundesliga. The list is separated into three parts, coinciding with the three major episodes of German football:

- Before 1945 the German league structure was changing rapidly. The end of World War II marks the end of this episode.
- From 1945–63 a German league structure without a nationwide league was maintained without greater changes.
- Since 1963 a nationwide league, the Bundesliga, exists.

Bayern have won the national championship 35 times; once before the inception of the Bundesliga and 34 times since. The club also won the DFB-Pokal 21 times and the DFL-Ligapokal 6 times, making them the record holder in number of cups and national championships won.

Bayern have won ten European titles: the Cup Winners' Cup in 1967, the UEFA Cup in 1996, the European Cup consecutively three times from 1974 to 1976, the Champions League in 2001, 2013 and 2020 (the latter two as part of seasonal trebles), and the UEFA Super Cup in 2013 and 2020. They additionally won the Intercontinental Cup in 1976 and 2001, and the Club World Cup in 2013 and 2020. Bayern are one of only three clubs to have won the European Cup three times in a row and the first and only German team to win a seasonal treble; they and Barcelona are the only sides to achieve a treble on two occasions.

Bayern were not anointed a spot in the Bundesliga at its inception, and thus played two additional seasons in the second division from 1963 to 1965, earning promotion by winning the qualification playoffs.

== Key ==
- Rank = Final position
- Pld = Matches played
- W = Matches won
- D = Matches drawn
- L = Matches lost
- GF = Goals for
- GA = Goals against
- GD = Goal difference
- Pts = Points
- Avg. att. = Average attendance at home
- GFC = German football championship
- Cup = Tschammerpokal / DFB-Pokal
- OL = Oberliga Süd
- OL2 = 2. Oberliga Süd
- RL = Regionalliga Süd
- BLQ = Bundesliga Qualification round
- BL = Bundesliga
- Europe = European competition entered
- Res. = Result in that competition
- — = Not attended
- NQ = Qualification stage
- R1 = Round 1
- R2 = Round 2
- R3 = Round 3
- R4 = Round 4
- Group = Group stage
- QF = Quarter-finals
- SF = Semi-finals
- RU = Runners-up
- W = Winners

Champions *	Runners-up ¤	Promoted ↑	Relegated ↓	Reached next stage of competition ∆

== Until 1933 ==
Season	Division	Pld	W	D	L	GF	GA	GD	Pts	Rank	GFC
1905–06	A-Klasse Südbayern	6	5	0	1	19	12	7	10	2	DNQ
1906–07	(Ostkreis) A-Klasse Oberbayern	8	5	3	0	30	8	22	13	2	DNQ
1907–08	(Ostkreis) A-Klasse Oberbayern	8	7	0	1	27	10	17	14	1 ∆	
1907–08	Endrunde Süddeutschland	4	1	2	1	16	12	4	4	2	DNQ
1908–09	(Ostkreis) A-Klasse Oberbayern	8	5	1	2	24	9	15	11	2	DNQ
1909–10	(Ostkreis) A-Klasse, Staffel Süd	8	6	1	1	46	14	32	13	1 ∆	
1909–10	Südbayrische Bezirksmeisterschaft, Ostkreis	6	6	0	0	33	10	23	12	1 ∆	
1909–10	Endrunde Süddeutschland	6	2	1	3	16	12	4	5	2	DNQ
1910–11	(Ostkreis) A-Klasse	18	16	1	1	107	21	86	33	1 ∆	
1910–11	Endrunde Süddeutschland	6	3	0	3	17	15	2	6	2	DNQ
1911–12	(Ostkreis) A-Klasse	20	17	1	2	78	25	53	35	2	DNQ
1912–13	Ostkreis-Liga	14	7	5	2	25	23	2	19	2	DNQ
1913–14	Ostkreis-Liga	14	6	3	5	17	16	1	15	5	DNQ
1914–15	No league operation due to the outbreak of the First World War										
1915 (autumn)	(Ostkreis) Gau Oberbayern, Staffel 1	8	8	0	0	40	5	35	16	1	Not held
1916 (spring)	(Ostkreis) Gau Oberbayern, Staffel 1	8	6	1	1	29	8	21	13	1	Not held
1916 (autumn)	(Ostkreis) Gau Oberbayern, Staffel 1	6	6	0	0	22	4	18	12	1	Not held
1917 (spring)	(Ostkreis) Gau Oberbayern	12	8	2	2	47	16	31	18	1	Not held
1917 (autumn)	(Ostkreis) Gau Oberbayern, Staffel 1	8	7	1	0	42	4	28	15	1	Not held
1918 (spring)	(Ostkreis) Gau Oberbayern, Staffel 1	10	7	2	1	29	7	22	16	2	Not held
1918 (autumn)	(Ostkreis) Gau Oberbayern	8	3	2	3	15	22	−7	8	4	Not held
1919 (spring)	(Ostkreis) Gau Oberbayern	10	6	3	1	24	8	16	15	2	Not held
1919–20	Kreisliga Südbayern	16	13	2	1	63	14	49	28	1 ∆	
1919–20	Endrunde Süddeutschland, Gruppe Süd	4	1	1	2	11	10	1	3	2	DNQ
1920–21	Kreisliga Südbayern	18	12	3	3	63	27	36	27	3	DNQ
1921–22	Kreisliga Südbayern, Abteilung 1	14	13	0	1	66	4	62	26	2	DNQ
1922–23	Kreisliga Südbayern	14	10	3	1	65	18	47	23	1	DNQ
1923–24	Bezirksliga Bayern	14	7	1	6	36	31	5	15	3	DNQ
1924–25	Bezirksliga Bayern	14	5	7	2	27	23	4	17	4	DNQ
1925–26	Bezirksliga Bayern	14	9	2	3	38	21	17	20	1 ∆	
1925–26	Endrunde Süddeutschland	10	8	2	0	56	17	39	18	1 ∆	R16
1926–27	Bezirksliga Bayern	18	10	3	5	41	26	15	23	5	DNQ
1927–28	Bezirksliga Bayern, Gruppe Süd	12	8	3	1	47	21	26	19	1 ∆	
1927–28	Endrunde Süddeutschland	14	10	4	0	41	17	24	24	1 ∆	SF
1928–29	Bezirksliga Bayern, Gruppe Süd	14	11	0	3	43	17	26	22	1 ∆	
1928–29	Endrunde Süddeutschland	14	9	2	3	47	28	19	20	2	QF
1929–30	Bezirksliga Bayern, Gruppe Süd	14	11	2	1	56	20	36	24	1 ∆	
1929–30	Endrunde Süddeutschland	14	8	0	6	55	30	25	16	3	DNQ
1930–31	Bezirksliga Bayern, Gruppe Süd	14	11	3	0	51	27	24	25	1 ∆	
1930–31	Endrunde Süddeutschland	14	9	1	4	43	24	19	19	3	DNQ
1931–32	Bezirksliga Bayern, Gruppe Süd	18	13	2	3	66	33	33	28	1 ∆	
1931–32	Endrunde Süddeutschland, Gruppe Südost	14	10	1	3	37	17	20	21	1 ∆	W *
1932–33	Bezirksliga Bayern, Gruppe Süd	18	13	4	1	63	14	49	30	1 ∆	
1932–33	Endrunde Süddeutschland, Gruppe Ostwest	14	7	3	4	27	16	11	17	4	DNQ

== Gauliga (1933–1945) ==
Season	Division	Pld	W	D	L	GF	A	GA	Pts	Rank	GFC	Cup
1933–34	Gauliga Bayern	22	11	5	6	53	35	18	27	3	DNQ	
1934–35	Gauliga Bayern	20	9	6	5	49	31	18	24	4	DNQ	
1935–36	Gauliga Bayern	18	11	2	5	47	26	21	24	3	DNQ	R1
1936–37	Gauliga Bayern	18	8	4	6	49	31	18	20	3	DNQ	R1
1937–38	Gauliga Bayern	18	8	3	7	37	29	8	19	5	DNQ	DNP
1938–39	Gauliga Bayern	18	7	3	8	26	31	−5	17	7	DNQ	R2
1939–40	Bereichsklasse Bayern	18	3	4	11	21	32	−11	10	8	DNQ	DNP
1940–41	Bereichsklasse Bayern	22	8	4	10	35	35	0	20	8	DNQ	R1
1941–42	Bereichsklasse Bayern	21	7	3	11	41	40	1	17	8	DNQ	DNP
1942–43	Gauliga Südbayern	18	10	2	6	52	23	29	22	3	DNQ	DNP
1943–44	Gauliga Südbayern	18	15	1	2	56	15	41	31	1	R1	R1
1944–45 (Note: Season was not completed due to the Second World War.)	Gauliga München-Oberbayern	15	14	1	0	75	15	60	29	1		

== 1945–1963 ==
Season	Division	Pld	W	D	L	GF	GA	GD	Pts	Rank	GFC	Avg. Att.	Cup	Europe	Res.	Top goalscorer(s)	Goals
1945–46	Oberliga Süd	30	12	10	8	67	48	19	34	6	Not held	Unknown				Holzmüller	17
1946–47	Oberliga Süd	38	12	12	14	75	56	19	36	11	Not held	13 316				Franz Bachl	12
1947–48	Oberliga Süd	38	21	8	9	72	38	34	50	4	DNQ	21 474				Hädelt	17
1948–49	Oberliga Süd	30	14	7	9	61	42	19	35	3	SQR	20 133				Hädelt; Scholz	13
1949–50	Oberliga Süd	30	11	3	16	56	70	−14	25	13	DNQ	16 067				Franz Bachl; Scholz	10
1950–51	Oberliga Süd	34	14	5	15	64	53	11	33	9	DNQ	16 824				Seemann	15
1951–52	Oberliga Süd	30	11	7	12	53	54	−1	29	8	DNQ	16 067				Seemann	12
1952–53	Oberliga Süd	30	12	6	12	59	56	3	30	7	DNQ	15 933	DNP			Heinz Lettl	13
1953–54	Oberliga Süd	30	9	10	11	42	46	−4	28	9	DNQ	17 867	DNP			Schädlich	8
1954–55	Oberliga Süd	30	6	3	21	42	76	−34	15	16 ↓	DNQ	15 600	DNP			Heinz Lettl	11
1955–56	2. Oberliga Süd	34	21	4	9	89	43	46	46	2 ↑	DNQ	13 000	DNP	—		Velhorn	19
1956–57	Oberliga Süd	30	12	2	16	52	62	−10	26	10	DNQ	20 867	W *	—		Erich Hahn	11
1957–58	Oberliga Süd	30	12	6	12	30	66	56	10	7	DNQ	21 000	DNP	—		Sommerlatt	16
1958–59	Oberliga Süd	30	17	5	8	79	49	30	39	4	DNQ	22 800	DNP	—		Klaus Kuhnert	20
1959–60	Oberliga Süd	30	17	4	9	81	55	26	34	5	DNQ	17 800	DNP	—		Peter Grosser	18
1960–61	Oberliga Süd	30	12	6	12	57	54	3	30	8	DNQ	14 667	DNP	—		Wagenbauer	13
1961–62	Oberliga Süd	30	17	6	7	67	55	12	40	3	DNQ	16 400	DNP	—		Rainer Ohlhauser	23
1962–63	Oberliga Süd	30	18	4	8	67	52	15	40	3	DNQ	19 067	DNP	Inter-Cities Fairs Cup	QF	Rainer Ohlhauser	24

== Since 1963 ==
As of end of 2025–26 season

Season	Division	Pld	W	D	L	GF	GA	GD	Pts	Rank	Avg. att.	Cup	Europe	Res.	Top goalscorer(s)	Goals
1963–64	Regionalliga Süd	38	22	8	8	115	61	54	52	2 ∆	26 000	DNP	—		Rainer Ohlhauser	33
1963–64	Bundesliga Aufstiegsrunde	6	3	1	2	12	7	5	7	2	28 000	DNP	—		Dieter Brenninger	6
1964–65	Regionalliga Süd	36	24	7	5	146	32	114	55	1 ∆	13 000	DNP	—		Rainer Ohlhauser	42
1964–65	Bundesliga Aufstiegsrunde	6	4	1	1	18	3	15	9	1 ↑	36 000	DNP	—		Rainer Ohlhauser	7
1965–66	Bundesliga	34	20	7	7	71	38	33	47	3	26 294	W *	—		Gerd Müller	14
1966–67	Bundesliga	34	16	5	13	62	47	15	37	6	22 353	W *	Cup Winners' Cup	W *	**Gerd Müller**	**28**
1967–68	Bundesliga	34	16	6	12	68	58	10	38	5	21 706	SF	Cup Winners' Cup	SF	Gerd Müller	20
1968–69	Bundesliga	34	18	10	6	61	31	30	46	1 *	25 029	W *	—		**Gerd Müller**	**30**
1969–70	Bundesliga	34	21	5	8	88	37	51	47	2 ¤	23 324	QF	European Cup	R1	**Gerd Müller**	**38**
1970–71	Bundesliga	34	19	10	5	74	36	38	48	2 ¤	24 088	W *	Inter-Cities Fairs Cup	QF	Gerd Müller	22
1971–72	Bundesliga	34	24	7	3	101	38	63	55	1 *	27 882	QF	Cup Winners' Cup	SF	**Gerd Müller**	**40**
1972–73	Bundesliga	34	25	4	5	93	29	64	54	1 *	33 353	QF	European Cup	QF	**Gerd Müller**	**36**
1973–74	Bundesliga	34	20	9	5	95	53	42	49	1 *	37 588	SF	European Cup	W *	**Gerd Müller**	**30**
1974–75	Bundesliga	34	14	6	14	57	63	−6	34	10	36 412	R3	European Cup	W *	Gerd Müller	23
1975–76	Bundesliga	34	15	10	9	72	50	22	40	3	32 971	SF	European Cup	W *	Gerd Müller	23
1976–77	Bundesliga	34	14	9	11	74	65	9	37	7	31 550	QF	European Cup	QF	Gerd Müller	28
1977–78	Bundesliga	34	11	10	13	62	64	−2	32	12	30 876	R3	UEFA Cup	R3	**Gerd Müller**	**24**
1978–79	Bundesliga	34	16	8	10	69	46	23	40	4	34 153	R2	—		Karl-Heinz Rummenigge	14
1979–80	Bundesliga	34	22	6	6	84	33	51	50	1 *	39 579	R3	UEFA Cup	SF	**Karl-Heinz Rummenigge**	**26**
1980–81	Bundesliga	34	22	9	3	89	41	48	53	1 *	36 412	R3	European Cup	SF	**Karl-Heinz Rummenigge**	**29**
1981–82	Bundesliga	34	20	3	11	77	56	21	43	3	33 372	W *	European Cup	RU ¤	Dieter Hoeneß	21
1982–83	Bundesliga	34	17	10	7	74	33	41	44	4	31 324	R2	Cup Winners' Cup	QF	Karl-Heinz Rummenigge	20
1983–84	Bundesliga	34	20	7	7	84	41	43	47	4	30 912	W *	UEFA Cup	R3	**Karl-Heinz Rummenigge**	**26**
1984–85	Bundesliga	34	21	8	5	79	38	41	50	1 *	32 765	RU ¤	Cup Winners' Cup	SF	Lothar Matthäus	16
1985–86	Bundesliga	34	21	7	6	82	31	51	49	1 *	28 765	W *	European Cup	QF	Dieter Hoeneß	15
1986–87	Bundesliga	34	20	13	1	67	31	34	53	1 *	37 471	R16	European Cup	RU ¤	Lothar Matthäus	14
1987–88	Bundesliga	34	22	4	8	83	45	38	48	2 ¤	28 034	QF	European Cup	QF	Lothar Matthäus	17
1988–89	Bundesliga	34	19	12	3	67	26	41	50	1 *	30 412	R16	UEFA Cup	SF	**Roland Wohlfarth**	**17**
1989–90	Bundesliga	34	19	11	4	64	28	36	49	1 *	36 235	R16	European Cup	SF	Roland Wohlfarth	13
1990–91	Bundesliga	34	18	9	7	74	41	33	45	2 ¤	35 833	R1	European Cup	SF	**Roland Wohlfarth**	**21**
1991–92	Bundesliga	38	13	10	15	59	61	−2	36	10	32 526	R2	UEFA Cup	R2	Roland Wohlfarth	17
1992–93	Bundesliga	34	18	11	5	74	45	29	47	2 ¤	46 059	R2	—		Bruno Labbadia	11
1993–94	Bundesliga	34	17	10	7	68	37	31	44	1 *	48 294	R16	UEFA Cup	R2	Mehmet Scholl Adolfo Valencia	11
1994–95	Bundesliga	34	15	13	6	55	41	14	43	6	54 176	R1	Champions League	SF	Christian Ziege	12
1995–96	Bundesliga	34	19	5	10	66	46	20	62	2 ¤	59 471	R2	UEFA Cup	W *	Jürgen Klinsmann	16
1996–97	Bundesliga	34	20	11	3	68	34	34	71	1 *	58 059	QF	UEFA Cup	R1	Jürgen Klinsmann	15
1997–98	Bundesliga	34	19	9	6	69	37	32	66	2 ¤	54 529	W *	Champions League	QF	Carsten Jancker	13
1998–99	Bundesliga	34	24	6	4	76	28	46	78	1 *	56 235	RU ¤	Champions League	RU ¤	Giovane Élber Carsten Jancker	13
1999–2000	Bundesliga	34	22	7	5	73	28	45	73	1 *	52 588	W *	Champions League	SF	Giovane Élber	14
2000–01	Bundesliga	34	19	6	9	62	37	25	63	1 *	52 538	R2	Champions League	W *	Giovane Élber	15
2001–02	Bundesliga	34	20	8	6	65	25	40	68	3	53 176	SF	Champions League	QF	Giovane Élber	17
2002–03	Bundesliga	34	23	6	5	70	25	45	75	1 *	52 574	W *	Champions League	GS1	**Giovane Élber**	**21**
2003–04	Bundesliga	34	20	8	6	70	39	31	68	2 ¤	55 471	QF	Champions League	R16	Roy Makaay	23
2004–05	Bundesliga	34	24	5	5	75	33	42	77	1 *	53 294	W *	Champions League	QF	Roy Makaay	22
2005–06	Bundesliga	34	22	9	3	67	32	35	75	1 *	66 000	W *	Champions League	R16	Roy Makaay	17
2006–07	Bundesliga	34	18	6	10	55	40	15	60	4	68 465	R16	Champions League	QF	Roy Makaay	16
2007–08	Bundesliga	34	22	10	2	68	21	47	76	1 *	69 000	W *	UEFA Cup	SF	**Luca Toni**	**24**
2008–09	Bundesliga	34	20	7	7	71	42	29	67	2 ¤	69 000	QF	Champions League	QF	Luca Toni	14
2009–10	Bundesliga	34	20	10	4	72	31	41	70	1 *	69 000	W *	Champions League	RU ¤	Arjen Robben	16
2010–11	Bundesliga	34	19	8	7	81	40	41	65	3	69 000	SF	Champions League	R16	**Mario Gómez**	**28**
2011–12	Bundesliga	34	23	4	7	77	22	55	73	2 ¤	69 000	RU ¤	Champions League	RU ¤	Mario Gómez	26
2012–13	Bundesliga	34	29	4	1	98	18	80	91	1 *	71 000	W *	Champions League	W *	Mario Mandžukić	15
2013–14	Bundesliga	34	29	3	2	94	23	70	90	1 *	71 000	W *	Champions League	SF	Mario Mandžukić	18
2014–15	Bundesliga	34	25	4	5	80	18	62	79	1*	72 822	SF	Champions League	SF	Robert Lewandowski Arjen Robben	17
2015–16	Bundesliga	34	28	4	2	80	17	63	88	1*	75 000	W *	Champions League	SF	**Robert Lewandowski**	**30**
2016–17	Bundesliga	34	25	7	2	89	22	67	82	1*	75 000	SF	Champions League	QF	Robert Lewandowski	30
2017–18	Bundesliga	34	27	3	4	92	28	64	84	1*	75 000	RU ¤	Champions League	SF	**Robert Lewandowski**	**29**
2018–19	Bundesliga	34	24	6	4	88	32	56	78	1*	75 000	W *	Champions League	R16	**Robert Lewandowski**	**22**
2019–20	Bundesliga	34	26	4	4	100	32	68	82	1*	75 000 (Note: Matches played behind closed doors due to the COVID-19 pandemic are not included.)	W *	Champions League	W *	**Robert Lewandowski**	**34**
2020–21	Bundesliga	34	24	6	4	99	44	55	78	1*	0 (Note: Season was played behind closed doors due to the COVID-19 pandemic.)	R2	Champions League	QF	**Robert Lewandowski**	**41**
2021–22	Bundesliga	34	24	5	5	97	37	60	77	1*	33 059 (Note: Season saw a reduced crowd capacity due to the COVID-19 pandemic.)	R2	Champions League	QF	**Robert Lewandowski**	**35**
2022–23	Bundesliga	34	21	8	5	92	38	54	71	1*	75 001	QF	Champions League	QF	Serge Gnabry	14
2023–24	Bundesliga	34	23	3	8	94	45	49	72	3	75 000	R2	Champions League	SF	**Harry Kane**	**36**
2024–25	Bundesliga	34	25	7	2	99	32	67	82	1*	75 000	R16	Champions League	QF	**Harry Kane**	**26**
2025–26	Bundesliga	34	28	5	1	122	36	86	89	1*	75 000	W *	Champions League	SF	**Harry Kane**	**36**
