= 1967–68 DFB-Pokal =

Tournament details
- Country: West Germany
- Teams: 32

Final positions
- Champions: 1. FC Köln
- Runner-up: VfL Bochum

Tournament statistics
- Matches played: 33
- Goals scored: 113 (3.42 per match)
- Top goal scorer(s): Hannes Löhr (5)

The 1967–68 DFB-Pokal was the 25th season of the annual German football cup competition. It began on 27 January 1968 and ended on 9 June 1968. Thirty-two teams competed in the five-round tournament. In the final the 1. FC Köln defeated the VfL Bochum 4–1.

== Matches ==
=== First round ===
27 January 1968	Borussia Neunkirchen	2–3	Eintracht Braunschweig
	Linsenmaier 27'; Kuntz 76'	report (in German)	Berg 18', 25'; Dulz 79'	Attendance: 5.000; Referee: Karl Niemeyer (Bad Godesberg)

27 January 1968	Bayer 04 Leverkusen	0–2	1. FC Nürnberg
		report (in German)	Strehl 3'; Starek 8'	Attendance: 15.000; Referee: Jan Redelfs (Hannover)

27 January 1968	SV Röchling Völklingen	4–2	SV Werder Bremen
	Christ 9', 71'; Martin 27', 59'	report (in German)	Görts 38'; Rupp 66'	Attendance: 4.500; Referee: Rudolf Schreiner (Wachenbuchen)

27 January 1968	Hertha BSC	1–0 (a.e.t.)	Hamburger SV	Olympiastadion, Berlin
	Sangulin 93'	report (in German)		Attendance: 40.000; Referee: Wilfried Hilker (Bochum)

27 January 1968	VfL Bochum	3–2	Karlsruher SC	Stadion an der Castroper Straße, Bochum
	Klever 28'; Böttcher 44'; Eversberg 70'	report (in German)	Herrmann 18' (pen.); Müller 63'	Attendance: 8.000; Referee: Elmar Schäfer (Buchholz)

27 January 1968	SC Preußen Münster	2–1	Alemannia Aachen
	Augustat 60' (pen.); Börger 80'	report (in German)	Glenski 76'	Attendance: 8.000; Referee: Karl-Heinz Mailand (Bremen)

27 January 1968	FC 08 Homburg	1–4	1. FC Köln
	Kittel 83' (pen.)	report (in German)	Pott 17', 84'; Thielen 38'; Rumor 40'	Attendance: 11.000; Referee: Heinz-Dieter Herbort (Hessisch Lichtenau)

27 January 1968	Arminia Bielefeld	0–1	FC Schalke 04
		report (in German)	Neuser 51'	Attendance: 22.000; Referee: Heinz Siebert (Mannheim)

27 January 1968	FC Bayern Hof	0–1	Borussia Mönchengladbach
		report (in German)	Laumen 84'	Attendance: 12.000; Referee: Helmut Fritz (Oggersheim)

27 January 1968	VfB Stuttgart	1–0	1. FC Kaiserslautern
	Köppel 75'	report (in German)		Attendance: 4.600; Referee: Gerd Hennig (Duisburg)

27 January 1968	MSV Duisburg	4–1	Hannover 96
	Kostedde 34', 67'; Bella 38' van Haaren 51'	report (in German)	Rodekamp 87'	Attendance: 5.000; Referee: Anton Binder (Holzgerlingen)

27 January 1968	1. FC Schweinfurt 05	1–2 (a.e.t.)	Eintracht Frankfurt
	Hohnhausen 37'	report (in German)	Friedrich 50'; Bechtold 98'	Attendance: 10.000; Referee: Ferdinand Biwersi (Bliesransbach)

27 January 1968	VfB Lübeck	0–1	TSV 1860 München
		report (in German)	Küppers 36'	Attendance: 17.000; Referee: Hans Voss (Münster)

27 January 1968	SSV Jahn Regensburg	1–4 (a.e.t.)	FC Bayern Munich
	Braun 53'	report (in German)	Müller 64', 109'; Eberl 108' (o.g.); Roth 115'	Attendance: 25.000; Referee: Franz Heumann (Ansbach)

27 January 1968	VfB Oldenburg	2–3	Borussia Dortmund
	Jung 39', 44'	report (in German)	Libuda 67'; Held 76'; Paul 87' (pen.)	Attendance: 17.000; Referee: Ewald Regely (Berlin)

7 February 1968	SSV Reutlingen 05	7–1	Itzehoer SV
	Ammer 11'; Mikulasch 29', 79'; Neuhäuser 31'; Braner 36'; Kammal 78'; Odenwald 83'	report (in German)	Thies 12'	Attendance: 3.000; Referee: Max Spindler (Mainz)

=== Round of 16 ===
24 February 1968	FC Bayern Munich	3–1	MSV Duisburg
	Ohlhauser 18'; Roth 41'; Müller 60' (pen.)	report (in German)	Kowalski 53'	Attendance: 12.000; Referee: Alfred Ott (Rheinbrohl)

24 February 1968	VfL Bochum	2–1	VfB Stuttgart	Stadion an der Castroper Straße, Bochum
	Balte 42' (pen.), 65'	report (in German)	Handschuh 29'	Attendance: 20.000; Referee: Bruno Schulz (Berlin)

24 February 1968	SSV Reutlingen 05	1–3	Borussia Dortmund
	Ammer 37'	report (in German)	Neuberger 35'; Held 58'; Emmerich 66'	Attendance: 18.000; Referee: Edmund Bien (Ruppertsberg)

24 February 1968	FC Schalke 04	2–3	Eintracht Braunschweig	Glückauf-Kampfbahn, Gelsenkirchen
	Słomiany 20'; Blechinger 73'	report (in German)	Gerwien 6'; Saborowski 54'; Maas 77'	Attendance: 6.000; Referee: Franz Wengenmeyer (Munich)

24 February 1968	1. FC Nürnberg	4–0	SC Preußen Münster
	Müller 18'; Volkert 35'; Strehl 58', 69'	report (in German)		Attendance: 5.500; Referee: Walter Horstmann (Hildesheim)

24 February 1968	Hertha BSC	2–1	SV Röchling Völklingen	Olympiastadion, Berlin
	Altendorff 42'; Krafczyk 53'	report (in German)	Martin 37'	Attendance: 23.000; Referee: Dietrich Basedow (Hamburg)

24 February 1968	TSV 1860 München	2–4	Borussia Mönchengladbach
	Rebele 21'; Zeiser 60'	report (in German)	Laumen 4', 46'; Wimmer 66'; Dietrich 84'	Attendance: 10.000; Referee: Gerhard Schulenburg (Hamburg)

24 February 1968	1. FC Köln	1–1 (a.e.t.)	Eintracht Frankfurt
	Overath 83'	report (in German)	Schämer 51'	Attendance: 15.000; Referee: Max Spindler (Mainz)

==== Replay ====
19 March 1968	Eintracht Frankfurt	0–1	1. FC Köln
		report (in German)	Jendrossek 86'	Attendance: 23.000; Referee: Edgar Deuschel (Ludwigshafen)

=== Quarter-finals ===
11 April 1968

FC Bayern Munich	2–1	1. FC Nürnberg
Ohlhauser 20'; Müller 32'	report (in German)	Brungs 2'

Attendance: 40.000
Referee: Willi Thier (Gelsenkirchen)
11 April 1968

Borussia Dortmund	2–1	Hertha BSC
Wosab 30'; Weber 75'	report (in German)	Altendorff 14'

Stadion Rote Erde, Dortmund
Attendance: 23.000
Referee: Horst Herden (Hamburg)
11 April 1968

Eintracht Braunschweig	1–1 (a.e.t.)	1. FC Köln
Ulsaß 92'	report (in German)	Löhr 110'

Attendance: 23.000
Referee: Ferdinand Biwersi (Bliesransbach)
11 April 1968

VfL Bochum	2–0	Borussia Mönchengladbach
Balte 11'; Böttcher 35'	report (in German)

Stadion an der Castroper Straße, Bochum
Attendance: 32.000
Referee: Edgar Deuschel (Ludwigshafen)

==== Replay ====
23 April 1968

1. FC Köln	2–1	Eintracht Braunschweig
Overath 2'; Löhr 24'	report (in German)	Ulsaß 53'

Attendance: 40.000
Referee: Rudolf Kreitlein (Stuttgart)

=== Semi-finals ===
3 May 1968

1. FC Köln	3–0	Borussia Dortmund
Thielen 11'; Löhr 24', 58'	report (in German)

Attendance: 53.000
Referee: Kurt Tschenscher (Mannheim)
15 May 1968

VfL Bochum	2–1	FC Bayern Munich
Jansen 5'; Balte 56'	report (in German)	Ohlhauser 90'

Stadion an der Castroper Straße, Bochum
Attendance: 40.000
Referee: Klaus Ohmsen (Hamburg)

=== Final ===
9 June 1968
16:00 CET

1. FC Köln	4–1	VfL Bochum
Jablonski 22' (o.g.); Rühl 38', 57'; Löhr 70'	Report	Böttcher 37'

Südweststadion, Ludwigshafen
Attendance: 60,000
Referee: Karl Riegg (Augsburg)
