= Metten =

- Municipality
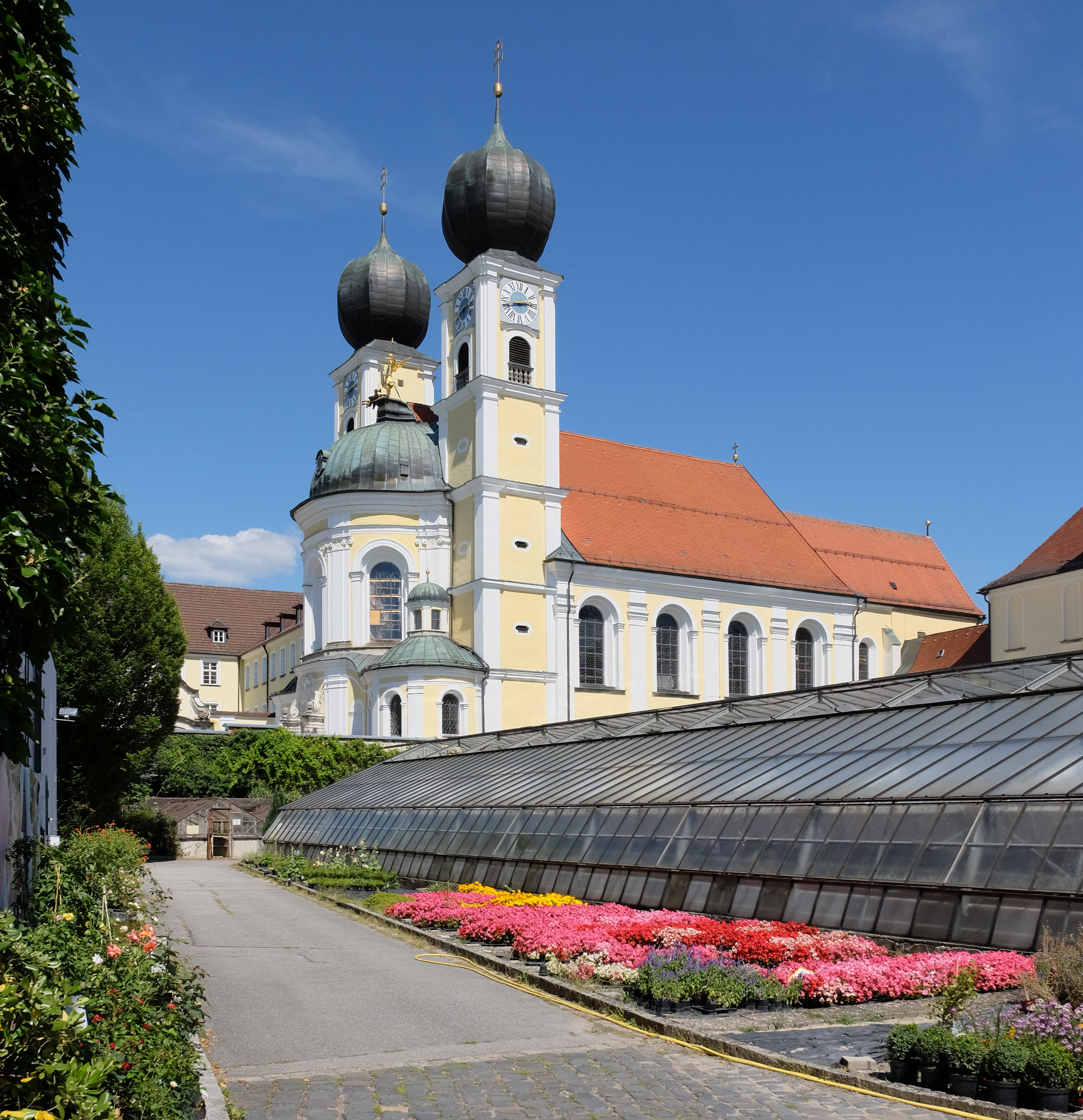
- Abbey Church of Saint Michael

- Coat of arms

- Location of Metten within Deggendorf district
- Interactive map of Metten
- Location within Germany Location within Bavaria
- Coordinates: 48°52′N 12°55′E
- Country: Germany
- State: Bavaria
- Admin. region: Niederbayern
- District: Deggendorf
- Subdivisions: 19 Ortsteile

Government
  - Mayor (2020–26): Andreas Moser

Area
  - Total: 11.95 km^{2} (4.61 sq mi)
- Elevation: 318 m (1,043 ft)

Population (2025-12-31)
  - Total: 4,263
  - Density: 356.7/km^{2} (923.9/sq mi)
- Time zone: UTC+01:00 (CET)
  - Summer (DST): UTC+02:00 (CEST)
- Postal codes: 94526
- Dialling codes: 0991
- Vehicle registration: DEG
- Website: www.markt-metten.de

Metten (German pronunciation: [ˈmɛtn̩]) is a municipality in the district of Deggendorf in Bavaria in Germany. It is located just about 4 kilometres southwest of its district capital Deggendorf .The town grew up around the Benedictine Metten Abbey, founded in 766. Metten is also the birthplace of former Bayern Munich goalkeeper Sepp Maier.
