= Heinz-Dieter Hasebrink =

German footballer (1941–2023)

Personal information
- Date of birth: 28 August 1941
- Place of birth: Essen, Gau Essen, Germany
- Date of death: 17 January 2023 (aged 81)
- Height: 1.81 m (5 ft 11 in)
- Position: Midfielder

Youth career
- 1958–1960: Rot-Weiss Essen

Senior career*
Years	Team	Apps	(Gls)
1960–1967	Rot-Weiss Essen		
1967–1969	1. FC Kaiserslautern	68	(19)
1969–1973	Werder Bremen	114	(16)
1975–1977	Atlas Delmenhorst		
- * Club domestic league appearances and goals

Heinz-Dieter Hasebrink (28 August 1941 – 17 January 2023) was a German professional footballer who played as a midfielder.

== Career ==
Born in Essen, Hasebrink played youth football at Rot-Weiss Essen before making his first-team debut in 1961. He scored 18 goals in the 1965–66 season at the end of which Rot-Weiss Essen was promoted to the Bundesliga. He scored the first two Bundesliga goals in the club's history on 27 August 1966.

Hasebrink moved to 1. FC Kaiserslautern in 1967 before playing for Werder Bremen from 1969 to 1973. He played in the Bundesliga for both clubs, making 114 appearances and scoring 16 goals for Werder Bremen.

Hasebrink joined Atlas Delmenhorst in 1974 and became a fan favourite, helping the club achieve two consecutive promotions: to the Landesliga in 1975 and to the Oberliga, the German third tier at the time, in 1976. In the 1975–76 season he scored 27 goals. He amassed a total of 67 goals in 109 appearances for Atlas Delmenhorst.

== Personal life and death ==
Following his retirement from playing In 1978, Hasebrink coached local clubs in the area while working at an insurance agency in Delmenhorst.

Hasebrink died on 17 January 2023, at the age of 81.
