= Dieter Danzberg =

German footballer (1940–2019)

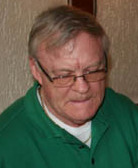

Personal information
- Date of birth: 12 November 1940
- Place of birth: Duisburg, Germany
- Date of death: 28 December 2019 (aged 79)
- Place of death: Dorsten, Germany
- Position: Defender

Youth career
- MSV

Senior career*
Years	Team	Apps	(Gls)
1960–1965	MSV		
1965–1966	FC Bayern Munich		
1966–1969	Rot-Weiß Oberhausen		
1969–1970	Freiburger FC		
1970–1971	Eintracht Gelsenkirchen		
- * Club domestic league appearances and goals

Dieter Danzberg (12 November 1940 – 28 December 2019) was a German professional footballer who played as a defender.

== Career ==
Born in Duisburg, Danzberg began his career with hometown club MSV, later playing with FC Bayern Munich, Rot-Weiß Oberhausen, Freiburger FC and Eintracht Gelsenkirchen.

== Later life and death ==
In 2009 he was diagnosed with Alzheimer's disease; in 2012 he moved into a nursing home in Dorsten, where he lived until his death at the age of 79 in December 2019.
