= Gustav Jung (footballer) =

German footballer

Personal information
- Date of birth: 4 June 1945
- Place of birth: Germany
- Date of death: 15 January 2000 (aged 54)
- Height: 1.72 m (5 ft 8 in)
- Position: Striker

Senior career*
Years	Team	Apps	(Gls)
1967–1969	FC Bayern Munich	25	(4)
1969–1975	Wuppertaler SV Borussia		
1975–1977	Karlsruher SC	11	(1)

International career
1968	West Germany U-23	1	(0)
- * Club domestic league appearances and goals

Gustav Jung (4 June 1945 – 15 January 2000) was a German football player. He spent seven seasons in the Bundesliga with FC Bayern Munich, Wuppertaler SV Borussia and Karlsruher SC.

== Honours ==
- Bundesliga champion: 1968–69
- DFB-Pokal winner: 1968–69
