= Sepp Maier =

Former German footballer

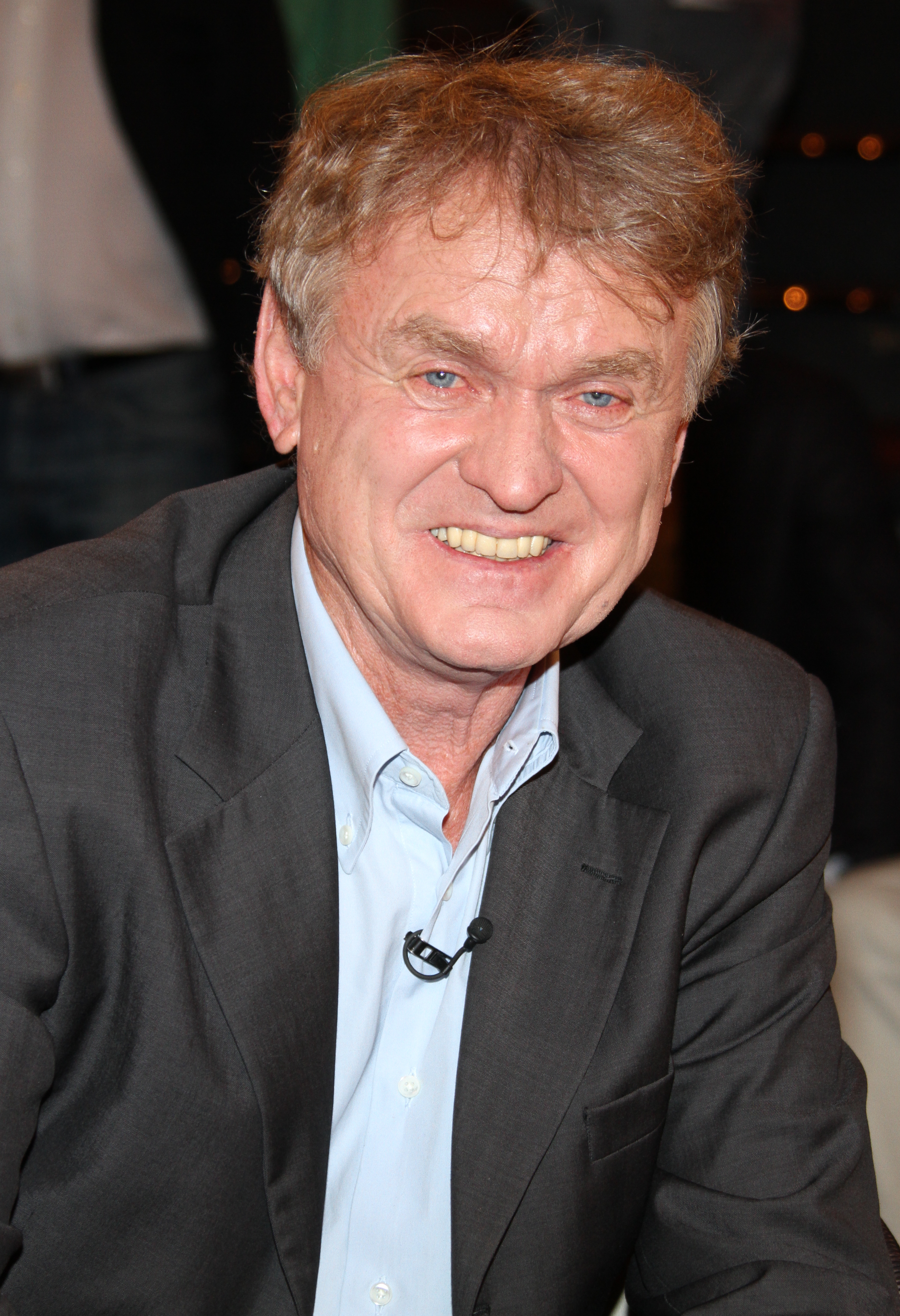
- Maier in 2012

Personal information
- Full name: Josef Dieter Maier
- Date of birth: 28 February 1944 (age 82)
- Place of birth: Metten, Germany
- Height: 1.85 m (6 ft 1 in)
- Position: Goalkeeper

Youth career
- 1952–1959: TSV Haar
- 1959–1962: Bayern Munich

Senior career*
Years	Team	Apps	(Gls)
1962–1980	Bayern Munich	537	(0)

International career
1961–1962	West Germany Youth	11	(0)
1963	West Germany Amateur	4	(0)
1966–1979	West Germany	95	(0)

Managerial career
- 1988–2004: Germany (goalkeeping coach)
- 1994–2008: Bayern Munich (goalkeeping coach)
Medal record
Men's football
Representing West Germany
FIFA World Cup
Runner-up	1966 England
Third place	1970 Mexico
Winner	1974 West Germany
UEFA European Championship
Winner	1972 Belgium
Runner-up	1976 Yugoslavia
- * Club domestic league appearances and goals

Josef Dieter "Sepp" Maier (German pronunciation: [ˈjoːzɛf ˈdiːtɐ zɛp ˈmaɪɐ]; born 28 February 1944) is a German former professional footballer who played as a goalkeeper for Bayern Munich and the West Germany national team. Regarded as one of football's greatest goalkeepers, he was nicknamed "Die Katze von Anzing" ("the cat from Anzing") for his fast reflexes, agility, flexibility, speed, and consistency. With 709 matches played across seventeen seasons, he was Bayern's all-time record appearance holder, until he was surpassed by Thomas Müller in 2024.

In addition to his shot-stopping ability, Maier was also known for his ability to dominate his box, as well as his sense of humour and personality throughout his career, which made him a fan favourite. Regarding his playing style, he once quipped "a keeper should give off a sense of calm, and not fall asleep while doing so."

== Club career ==
Born in Metten, Bavaria, Maier spent his entire professional career at Bayern Munich. He began playing for Bayern's youth sides in 1958. During the 1970s, he was part of the legendary Bayern team which included the likes of Franz Beckenbauer and Gerd Müller which won four West German league titles, three German cups, and three consecutive European Cups (1974 defeating Atlético Madrid, 1975 defeating Leeds United, 1976 defeating AS Saint-Étienne). He had previously tasted success in Europe in 1967 when Bayern won the European Cup Winners Cup, defeating Rangers F.C. in the final in extra time. In the five games of the four European finals, the 1974 title having been won in a replay, Maier allowed a total of one goal.

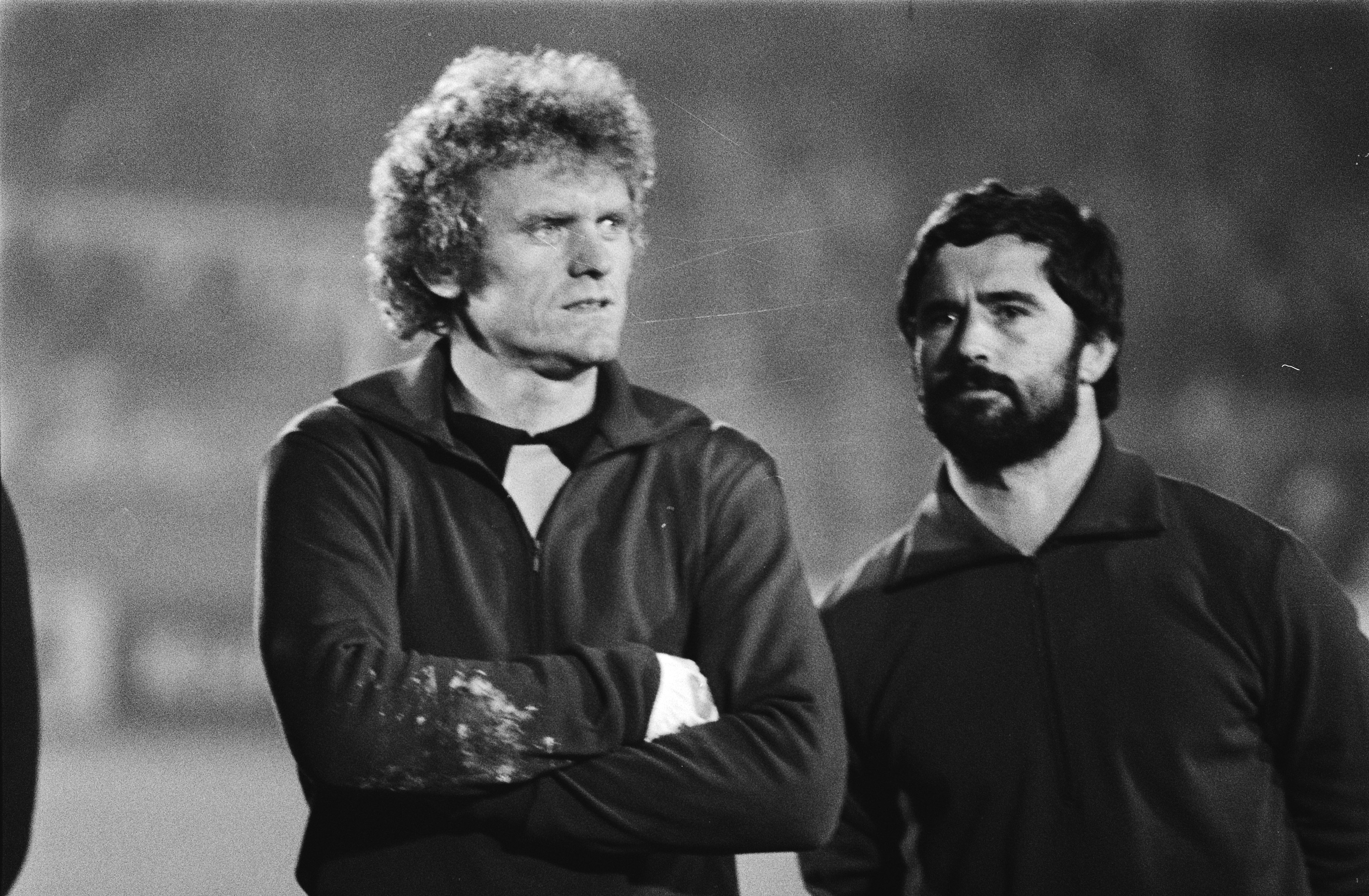
Maier (left) with fellow Bayern Munich teammate Gerd Müller in 1978

Maier was elected German Footballer of the Year in 1975, 1977, and 1978. Between 1966 and 1979 he played in 442 consecutive Bundesliga matches, still a German national record.

On 14 July 1979, Maier suffered serious injuries in a self-inflicted traffic accident. While aquaplaning, he veered out of his lane and collided with an oncoming car, resulting in minor injuries to two women. Initially admitted to the district hospital over the weekend, medical staff there failed to recognize the extent of his injuries, diagnosing only a few rib fractures. However, through his friend Uli Hoeneß, newly appointed as Bayern manager, Maier was connected with the Bayern club doctor. Upon the doctor's recommendation, Maier was transferred to Großhadern hospital, where X-rays revealed a ruptured lung, a displaced liver, a torn diaphragm, and a collection of two and a half liters of blood in his abdominal cavity. An emergency surgery at Großhadern saved Maier's life. He started training again on 26 November 1979, but then had to end his career, having missed the entire 1979–80 season.

== International career ==
Maier was selected in the West Germany squad for four consecutive World Cups. In 1966 in England, he was a non-playing deputy to Hans Tilkowski. At the 1970 FIFA World Cup in Mexico, he was the starter and played all games (including the 4–3 semifinal loss to Italy after extra time) except the third-place match in which Horst Wolter was put on the starting lineup.

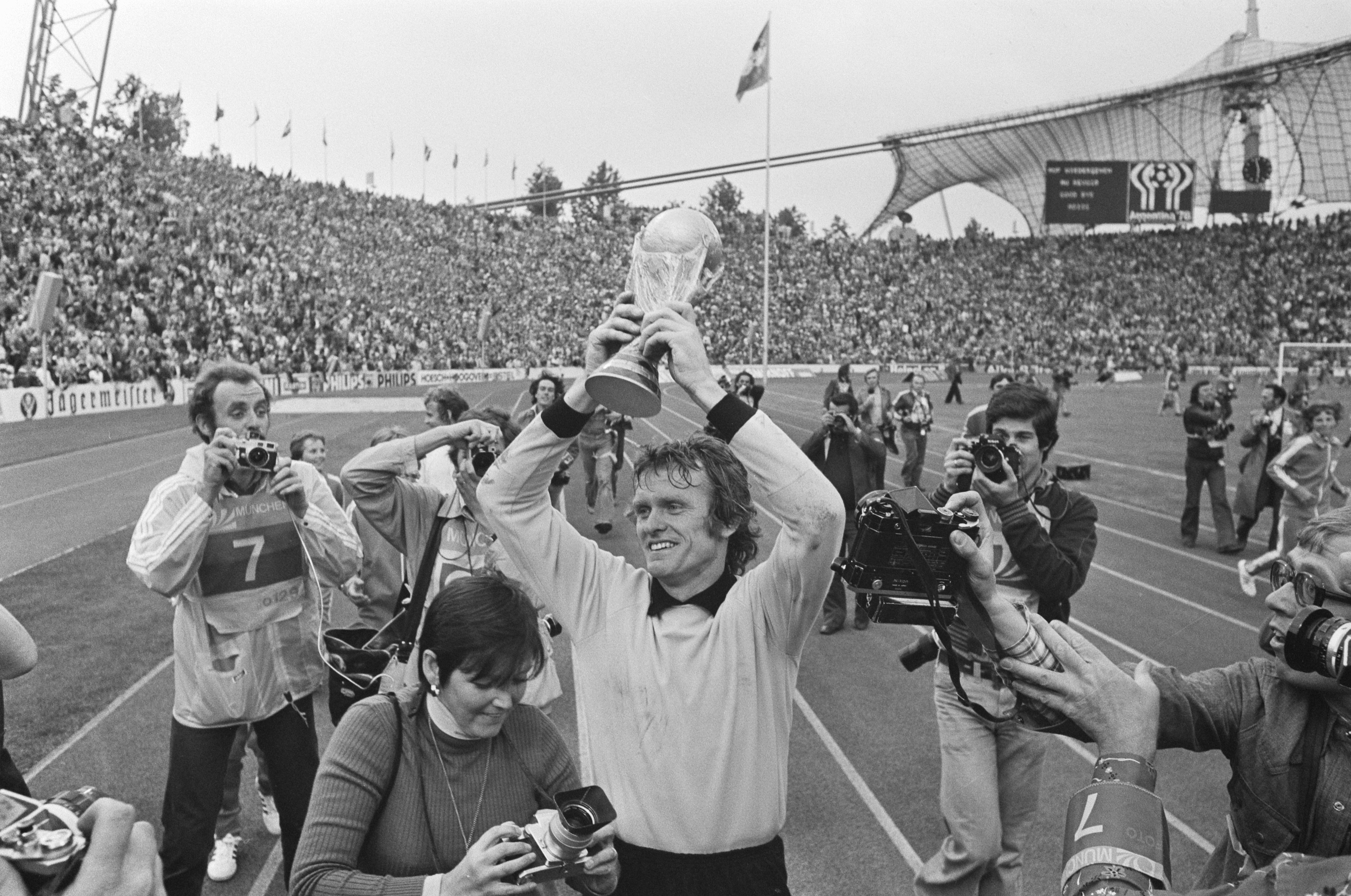
Maier holding the 1974 FIFA World Cup trophy

In the 1974 FIFA World Cup on home soil, at the top of his footballing abilities, he reached the peak of his international career as the Germans went all the way to the final with a legendary team that included the likes of Franz Beckenbauer, Berti Vogts, Gerd Müller and Paul Breitner. The greatest triumph came when the hosts defeated a Johan Cruyff-led Netherlands team 2–1 in the final in Maier's own hometown Munich.

Four years later at the World Cup in Argentina Maier delivered a strong performance but could not prevent his side's failing to advance past the second round. Maier also won the 1972 European Championship with West Germany and reached the final in 1976, losing to Czechoslovakia on penalty kicks. On this occasion he was on the receiving end of the original Panenka penalty. In all, he earned 95 caps for his country.

== Post-playing career ==
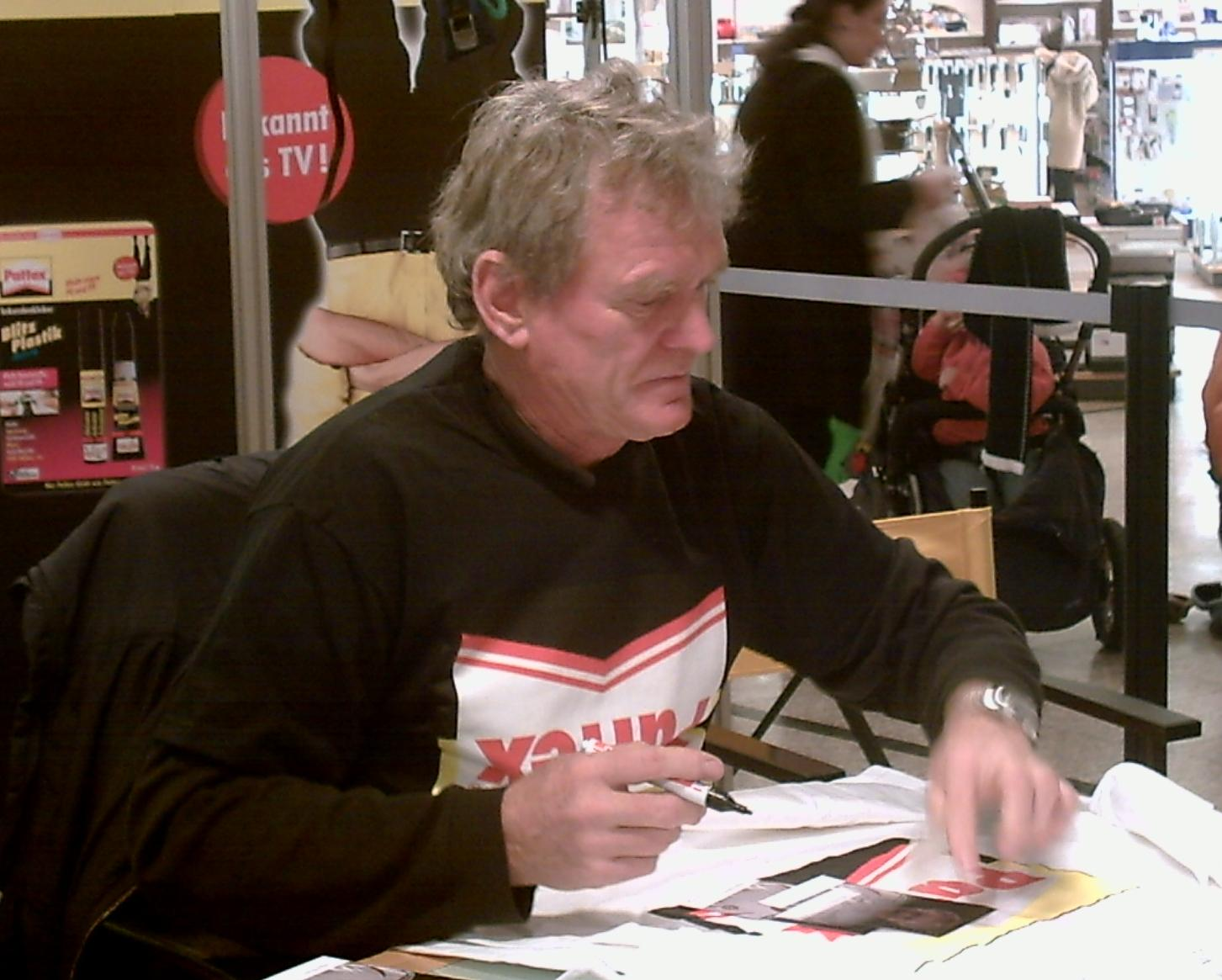
Maier in 2007

Maier went into coaching for both club and country and mentored Oliver Kahn. In October 2004 his contract with the national side was terminated by manager Jürgen Klinsmann after Maier spoke out in favour of Kahn over Arsenal's Jens Lehmann in a dispute over who should be the side's first-choice goalkeeper. He continued to work as head goalkeeping coach for Bayern and retired in 2008.

== Personal life ==
Besides his goalkeeping exploits, Maier was famous for his overlong shorts and being the first goalkeeper to wear the now-standard, outsize, "Mickey Mouse" gloves, as well as his sense of humour. He is remembered for an incident where he became bored during a match at the Olympiastadion as the opposing side had yet to threaten his goal. A duck wandered onto the pitch and Maier attempted to catch it.

In June 2009, Maier was honoured by the Bavarian government with the Life Achievement Award.

== Career statistics ==
=== Club ===
Appearances and goals by club, season and competition
Club	Season	League			DFB-Pokal		Europe		Other		Total	
Club	Season	Division	Apps	Goals	Apps	Goals	Apps	Goals	Apps	Goals	Apps	Goals
Bayern Munich	1962–63	Oberliga Süd	4	0	—		1 (Note: Appearance(s) in Inter-Cities Fairs Cup)	0	—		5	0
Bayern Munich	1963–64	Regionalliga Süd	24	0	—		7 (Note: Appearances in Intertoto Cup)	0	6 (Note: Appearances in Regionalliga promotion play-offs)	0	37	0
Bayern Munich	1964–65	Regionalliga Süd	36	0	—		—		8 (Note: Six appearances in Regionalliga promotion play-offs, two appearances in Süddeutscher Pokal)	0	44	0
Bayern Munich	1965–66	Bundesliga	31	0	6	0	—		—		37	0
Bayern Munich	1966–67	Bundesliga	34	0	5	0	9 (Note: Appearances in European Cup Winners' Cup)	0	—		48	0
Bayern Munich	1967–68	Bundesliga	34	0	4	0	8	0	—		46	0
Bayern Munich	1968–69	Bundesliga	34	0	6	0	—		—		40	0
Bayern Munich	1969–70	Bundesliga	34	0	3	0	2 (Note: Appearances in European Cup)	0	—		39	0
Bayern Munich	1970–71	Bundesliga	34	0	7	0	8	0	—		49	0
Bayern Munich	1971–72	Bundesliga	34	0	5	0	8	0	—		47	0
Bayern Munich	1972–73	Bundesliga	34	0	5	0	5	0	3 (Note: Appearances in DFB-Ligapokal)	0	47	0
Bayern Munich	1973–74	Bundesliga	34	0	4	0	10	0	—		48	0
Bayern Munich	1974–75	Bundesliga	34	0	3	0	7	0	—		44	0
Bayern Munich	1975–76	Bundesliga	34	0	7	0	9	0	2 (Note: Appearances in European Super Cup)	0	52	0
Bayern Munich	1976–77	Bundesliga	34	0	4	0	6	0	4 (Note: Two appearances in European Super Cup, two appearances in Intercontinental Cup)	0	48	0
Bayern Munich	1977–78	Bundesliga	34	0	3	0	6 (Note: Appearances in UEFA Cup)	0	—		43	0
Bayern Munich	1978–79	Bundesliga	34	0	1	0	—		—		35	0
Bayern Munich	1979–80	Bundesliga	0	0	0	0	0	0	—		0	0
Career total			537	0	63	0	86	0	23	0	709	0

=== International ===
Appearances and goals by national team and year
National team	Year	Apps	Goals
West Germany	1966	3	0
West Germany	1967	4	0
West Germany	1968	5	0
West Germany	1969	6	0
West Germany	1970	9	0
West Germany	1971	8	0
West Germany	1972	7	0
West Germany	1973	5	0
West Germany	1974	12	0
West Germany	1975	6	0
West Germany	1976	6	0
West Germany	1977	8	0
West Germany	1978	12	0
West Germany	1979	4	0
Total		95	0

== Honours ==
Bayern Munich

- Regionalliga Süd: 1964–65
- Bundesliga: 1968–69, 1971–72, 1972–73, 1973–74
- DFB-Pokal: 1965–66, 1966–67, 1968–69, 1970–71
- European Cup: 1973–74, 1974–75, 1975–76
- European Cup Winners' Cup: 1966–67
- Intercontinental Cup: 1976

West Germany

- FIFA World Cup: 1974
- UEFA European Championship: 1972

Individual

- FIFA World Cup All-Star Team: 1974
- kicker Bundesliga Team of the Season: 1974–75
- Footballer of the Year (Germany): 1975, 1977, 1978
- FIFA 100
- Germany's goalkeeper of the Century
- World Soccer: The 100 Greatest Footballers of All Time
- One Club Man Award: 2017
- Bayern Munich All-time XI
- Member of Germany's Sports Hall of Fame

== See also ==
- List of one-club men
