= Helmut Schmidt (footballer) =

German footballer

Personal information
- Date of birth: 9 June 1949 (age 77)
- Place of birth: Munich, West Germany
- Height: 1.76 m (5 ft 9 in)
- Position: Midfielder

Youth career
- 1956–1967: Schwarz-Weiß München

Senior career*
Years	Team	Apps	(Gls)
1967–1970	FC Bayern Munich	49	(2)
1970–1972	Kickers Offenbach		
1972–1974	Borussia Dortmund		
1974–1976	ESV Ingolstadt		
1976–1980	TSV 1860 Rosenheim		

International career
1969	West Germany U-23	2	(0)
- * Club domestic league appearances and goals

Helmut Schmidt (born 9 June 1949) is a German retired football player. He spent four seasons in the Bundesliga with FC Bayern Munich and Kickers Offenbach.

== Honours ==
- Bundesliga champion: 1969
- Bundesliga runner-up: 1970
- DFB-Pokal winner: 1969, 1970
