= Carl-Heinz Rühl =

German footballer and manager (1939–2019)

Personal information
- Date of birth: 14 November 1939
- Place of birth: Berlin, Germany
- Date of death: 30 December 2019 (aged 80)
- Place of death: Cologne, Germany
- Height: 1.81 m (5 ft 11 in)
- Position: Forward

Senior career*
Years	Team	Apps	(Gls)
1963–1965	Hertha BSC	54	(9)
1965–1967	MSV Duisburg	65	(21)
1967–1970	1. FC Köln	85	(35)
Total		204	(65)

Managerial career
- 1973–1977: Karlsruher SC
- 1977: Aris Thessaloniki
- 1977–1978: MSV Duisburg
- 1978–1979: Borussia Dortmund
- 1979–1981: 1860 Munich
- 1981–1983: VfL Osnabrück
- 1985–1994: Karlsruher SC (director)
- 1995–1997: Hertha BSC (director)
- 1997–1998: 1. FC Köln (director)
- * Club domestic league appearances and goals

Carl-Heinz Rühl (14 November 1939 – 30 December 2019) was a German football player and manager.

== Honours ==
- DFB-Pokal: 1967–68
