= Hans-Jürgen Jansen =

German footballer

Jürgen Jansen
Personal information
- Full name: Hans-Jürgen Jansen
- Date of birth: 27 September 1941 (age 85)
- Positions: Midfielder; striker

Youth career
- –1960: Homberger SpV 03

Senior career*
| Years | Team | Apps | (Gls) |
| 1960–1965 | Homberger SpV 03 | | |
| 1965–1967 | Eintracht Gelsenkirchen | 58 | (13) |
| 1967–1971 | VfL Bochum | 125 | (16) |
| 1971– | VfB Homberg | | |

International career
| 1962 | West Germany Olympic | 1 | (0) |
Medal record
Homberger SpV 03
| Winner | Verbandsliga Niederrhein | 1963–64 |
VfL Bochum
| Runner-up | DFB-Pokal | 1967–68 |
| Runner-up | Regionalliga West | 1968–69 |
| Winner | Regionalliga West | 1969–70 |
| Winner | Regionalliga West | 1970–71 |
- * Club domestic league appearances and goals

Hans-Jürgen Jansen (born 27 September 1941) is a retired German footballer.

== Career ==
=== Statistics ===
| Club performance | | | League | | Cup | | Other | | Total | |
| Season | Club | League | Apps | Goals | Apps | Goals | Apps | Goals | Apps | Goals |
| West Germany | | | League | | DFB-Pokal | | Other^{1} | | Total | |
|---|---|---|---|---|---|---|---|---|---|---|
| 1960–61 | Homberger SpV 03 | Verbandsliga Niederrhein | | | — | | — | | | |
| 1961–62 | Homberger SpV 03 | Verbandsliga Niederrhein | | | — | | — | | | |
| 1962–63 | Homberger SpV 03 | Verbandsliga Niederrhein | | | — | | | | | |
| 1963–64 | Homberger SpV 03 | Verbandsliga Niederrhein | | | — | | | | | |
| 1964–65 | Homberger SpV 03 | Regionalliga West | 23 | 7 | — | | — | | 23 | 7 |
| 1965–66 | Eintracht Gelsenkirchen | Regionalliga West | | | — | | — | | | |
| 1966–67 | Eintracht Gelsenkirchen | Regionalliga West | | | — | | — | | | |
| 1967–68 | VfL Bochum | Regionalliga West | 31 | 3 | 5 | 1 | — | | 36 | 4 |
| 1968–69 | VfL Bochum | Regionalliga West | 33 | 11 | — | | — | | 33 | 11 |
| 1969–70 | VfL Bochum | Regionalliga West | 33 | 3 | — | | 2 | 0 | 35 | 3 |
| 1970–71 | VfL Bochum | Regionalliga West | 28 | 0 | — | | 8 | 1 | 36 | 1 |
| 1971–72 | VfB Homberg | Verbandsliga Niederrhein | | | — | | — | | | |
| Total | West Germany | | | | 5 | 1 | | | | |
| Career total | | | | | 5 | 1 | | | | |

^{1} 1962–63 and 1963–64 include the Verbandsliga Niederrhein promotion playoffs. 1969–70 and 1970–71 include the Regionalliga promotion playoffs.
