= Walter Rodekamp =

German footballer

Personal information
- Full name: Walter Rodekamp
- Date of birth: 13 January 1941
- Place of birth: Hagen, Germany
- Date of death: 10 May 1998 (aged 57)
- Place of death: Hagen, Germany
- Position: Striker

Senior career*
Years	Team	Apps	(Gls)
1962–1963	FC Schalke 04	3	(0)
1963–1968	Hannover 96	157	(71)
1968-1971	RFC Liège	23	(13)
1971-1974	Berchem Sport	16	(1)

International career
1965	Germany	3	(1)
- * Club domestic league appearances and goals

Walter Rodekamp (13 January 1941 in Hagen – 10 May 1998 in Hagen) was a German footballer. He spent four seasons in the Bundesliga with Hannover 96. He also represented Germany in three friendlies. Later in his life he suffered from alcoholism.
