= Hans Rigotti =

German footballer

Personal information
- Date of birth: 15 May 1947 (age 79)
- Place of birth: Germany
- Height: 1.78 m (5 ft 10 in)
- Position: Defender

Youth career
- 1964–1965: Bayern Munich

Senior career*
Years	Team	Apps	(Gls)
1965–1968	Bayern Munich	33	(2)
1968–1969	1. FC Nürnberg	4	(0)
1969–1973	Stuttgarter Kickers	107	(3)
Total		144	(5)
Medal record
Bayern Munich
Winner	DFB-Pokal	1966
Winner	DFB-Pokal	1967
- * Club domestic league appearances and goals

Hans Rigotti (born 15 May 1947) is a German former footballer.
