= Gerhard Neuser =

German association football player

Personal information
- Date of birth: 29 October 1938
- Place of birth: Wilgersdorf, Germany
- Date of death: 7 August 1993 (aged 54)
- Height: 1.63 m (5 ft 4 in)
- Position: Midfielder

Senior career*
Years	Team	Apps	(Gls)
1958–1965	Sportfreunde Siegen	85	(50)
1965–1970	Schalke 04	143	(19)
1970–1973	Sportfreunde Siegen	31	(3)
- * Club domestic league appearances and goals

Gerhard Neuser (29 October 1938 – 7 August 1993) was a German footballer. He made 143 appearances in the Bundesliga for Schalke 04.
