= Fritz Pott =

German footballer and coach

Personal information
- Date of birth: 23 April 1939
- Place of birth: Cologne, Germany
- Date of death: 11 January 2015 (aged 75)
- Place of death: Cologne, Germany
- Height: 1.72 m (5 ft 8 in)
- Position: Defender

Youth career
- Rot-Weiß Zollstock

Senior career*
Years	Team	Apps	(Gls)
1958–1970	1. FC Köln	228	(11)
1970–1971	SpVgg Frechen		

International career
1962–1964	Germany	3	(0)

Managerial career
- SC Brühl
- SpVg Frechen 20
- 1978–1979: Viktoria Köln
- * Club domestic league appearances and goals

Fritz Pott (23 April 1939 – 11 January 2015) was a German football player and coach. As a player, he spent seven seasons in the Bundesliga with 1. FC Köln. He represented Germany in three friendlies.

He died on 11 January 2015.

== Honours ==
- Bundesliga champion: 1963–64
- DFB-Pokal winner: 1967–68
- DFB-Pokal finalist: 1969–70
