= Grünwalder Stadion =

Football stadium in Munich

- Sechzger Stadion; Grünwalder
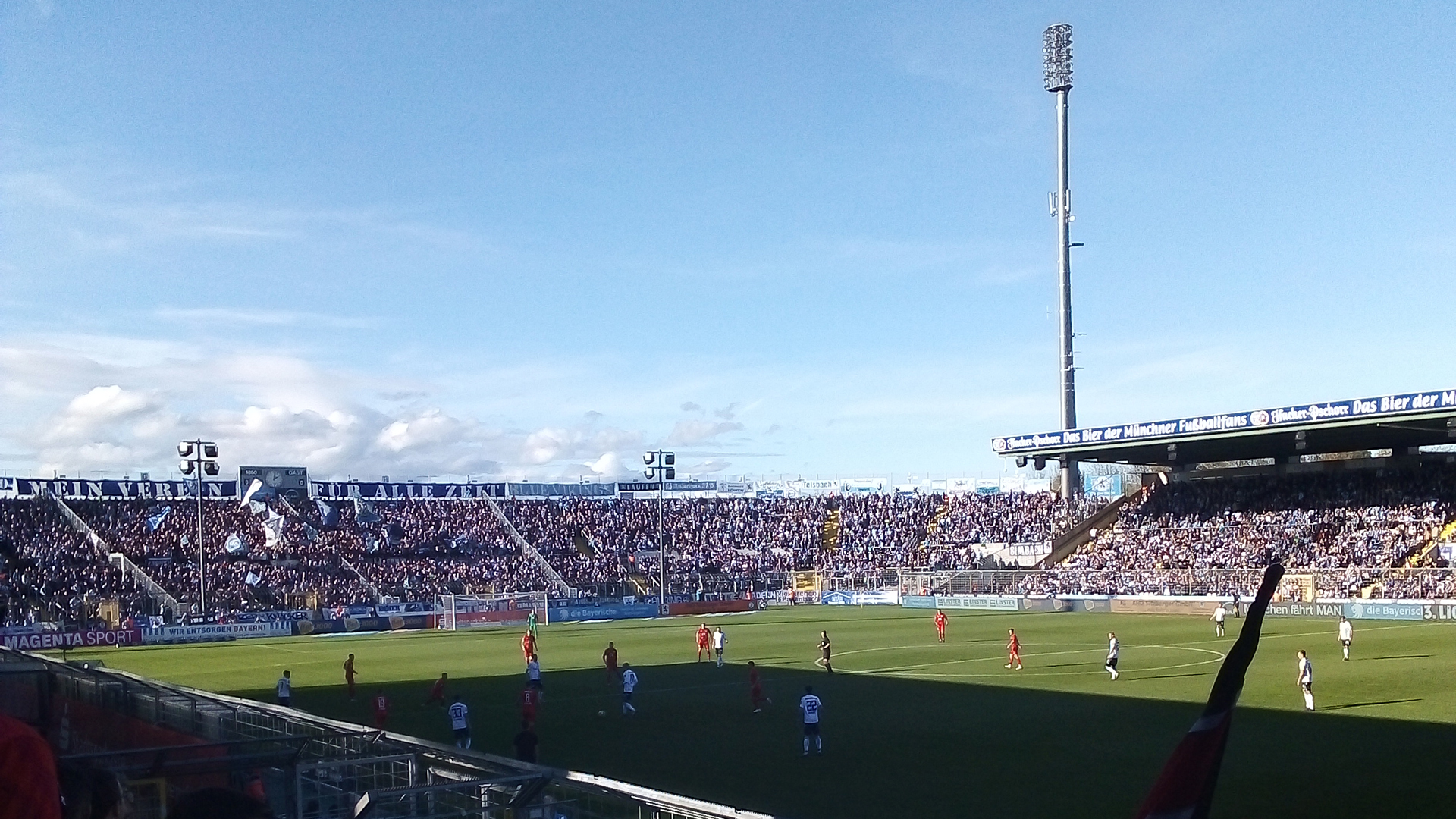
- View from inside
- Interactive map of Grünwalder Stadion
- Full name: Städtisches Stadion an der Grünwalder Straße
- Former names: Sportplatz an der Grünwalder Straße (21 May 1911 – 10 October 1926); Stadion an der Grünwalder Straße (10 October 1926 – 1 July 1927); Heinrich-Zisch-Stadion (1 July 1927 – 1 April 1939); Sportplatz an der Grünwalder Straße (1 April 1939 – 22 May 1941); Hanns-Braun-Kampfbahn (22 May 1941 – 1 August 1945)
- Location: Grünwalder Straße 4, Munich, Germany
- Coordinates: 48°06′39″N 11°34′28″E
- Owner: City of Munich
- Operator: City of Munich
- Capacity: 15,000
- Surface: Grass

Construction
- Built: 1911
- Opened: 21 May 1911
- Renovated: 1926, 1939, 1951, 1961, 1971, 1979, 2012–2013

Tenants
- TSV 1860 Munich (1911–1995, 2004–2005, 2017–present); Bayern Munich (1926–1972); TSV 1860 Munich II (1995–2017); Bayern Munich II (1995–present); Bayern Munich (women) (2013–2017); Türkgücü München (selected matches)

Städtisches Stadion an der Grünwalder Straße (also known as Grünwalder Stadion and Sechzger Stadion) is a football stadium in Munich, Germany. It was built in 1911 and was the home ground for 1860 Munich until 1995. Local rival Bayern Munich also played in the stadium from 1926 until 1972, when they moved to the new Olympiastadion. It is the home ground of the second teams and the U–19 teams of Bayern Munich and 1860 Munich. As of the start of the 2013–14 Bundesliga season, Bayern Munich Women also play their home matches at the ground until 2017. Since 1860 Munich were relegated from 2. Bundesliga (second tier) to Regionalliga Bayern (fourth tier) at the end of the 2016–17 season, the senior team returned to the stadium and have played there ever since.

For the 2018–19 season, 1860's first season back in the 3. Liga following promotion from the fourth tier Regionalliga Bayern, the stadium's capacity was 15,000. 1860 Munich regularly sell out home matches in what is regarded as the club's spiritual home at Sechszigerstadion, and the stadium is easily accessible on public transport from Munich city centre. The stadium is known for its curved western terrace known as the Westkurve, where currently 9,000 1860 Munich fans stand creating an impressive atmosphere. Bayern Munich II also play at the stadium, but only open the covered seated Nordtribune to home fans for matches. Following their promotion to the third tier for the 2019/20 3. Liga season, Bayern Munich II are now in the same league as 1860, leading to the first Munich city derbies in several years. In 2020, Türkgücü München announced they would become the third 3. Liga tenants to play at the stadium should they secure promotion, which is likely to cause fixture congestion in the future.

The largest crowd was 58,560 in 1948 at a game between 1860 Munich and 1. FC Nürnberg. The 15,000 capacity Grünwalder Stadion no longer meets the requirements for the 2. Bundesliga meaning that tenants may need to move to the Olympiastadion or another ground upon promotion from the 3. Liga.

The Monty Python sketch The Philosophers' Football Match, though set in the Olympiastadion, was filmed in this stadium.

== See also ==
- List of football stadiums in Germany
- Lists of stadiums
