= Adolf Kunstwadl =

German footballer

Personal information
- Date of birth: 8 February 1940
- Place of birth: Munich, Germany
- Date of death: 12 November 2016 (aged 76)
- Place of death: Germany
- Position: Defender

Senior career*
Years	Team	Apps	(Gls)
1961–1967	Bayern Munich	99	(2)
1967–1974	Wacker München	134	(2)
Total		233	(4)
- * Club domestic league appearances and goals

Adolf Kunstwadl (8 February 1940 – 12 November 2016) was a German professional footballer who played for Bayern Munich and Wacker München.
