= Dieter Koulmann =

German footballer

Personal information
- Date of birth: 4 December 1939
- Place of birth: Blumberg, Germany
- Date of death: 26 July 1979 (aged 39)
- Height: 1.72 m (5 ft 8 in)
- Position: Midfielder

Youth career
- –1963: SC Schwenningen

Senior career*
Years	Team	Apps	(Gls)
1963–1968	Bayern Munich	125	(24)
1968–1969	Kickers Offenbach	22	(3)
1969–1970	MSV Duisburg	2	(0)
Total		149	(7)
- * Club domestic league appearances and goals

Dieter Koulmann (4 December 1939 – 26 July 1979) was a German footballer. He was part of the Bayern Munich team of the mid-1960s, winning the DFB-Pokal in 1966 and 1967, and the UEFA Cup Winners' Cup in 1967. He later had spells with Kickers Offenbach and MSV Duisburg.
