= Hans Nowak =

German footballer

Personal information
- Full name: Hans Nowak
- Date of birth: 9 August 1937
- Place of birth: Gelsenkirchen, Germany
- Date of death: 19 July 2012 (aged 74)
- Height: 1.76 m (5 ft 9 1/2 in)
- Position: Defender

Youth career
- 1946–1953: Eintracht Gelsenkirchen
- 1953–1958: Alemannia Gelsenkirchen

Senior career*
Years	Team	Apps	(Gls)
1958–1965	FC Schalke 04	145	(27)
1965–1968	FC Bayern Munich	37	(4)
1968–1971	Kickers Offenbach	12	(0)
Total		194	(31)

International career
1961–1964	West Germany	15	(0)
- * Club domestic league appearances and goals

Hans Nowak (9 August 1937 – 19 July 2012) was a German football player. He played in four matches at the 1962 FIFA World Cup.

== Club career ==
Nowak was born in Gelsenkirchen, Germany. While playing for FC Bayern Munich, he won the Cup Winners' Cup in 1967.

== International career ==
Nowak became notable for being the first attacking full-back in German football. Between September 1961 and November 1964, Nowak was the standard right back of West Germany, starting in 15 out of 20 international games during that period. He didn't score during this period.

== Career after pro times ==
After retiring in 1971, Nowak coached FC Hochstadt and FC Herzogenaurach. He later worked for Puma AG in Herzogenaurach, becoming director of public relations there. After leaving Puma AG in 1991, he worked for FC Bayern Munich, organising the sales of merchandising.
