= Werner Olk =

Former football player and manager

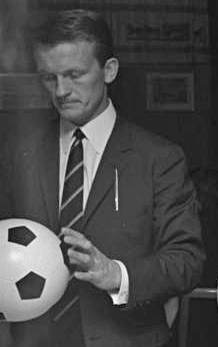
- Olk in 1967

Personal information
- Date of birth: 18 January 1938 (age 88)
- Place of birth: Osterode in Ostpreußen, Germany (now Poland)
- Height: 1.74 m (5 ft 9 in)
- Position: Defender

Senior career*
Years	Team	Apps	(Gls)
1956–1960	Arminia Hannover		
1960–1970	Bayern Munich	266	(4)
1970–1973	FC Aarau		

International career
1961	West Germany	1	(0)

Managerial career
- 1970–1973: FC Aarau
- 1974–1975: Preußen Münster
- 1977–1978: FC Augsburg
- 1978–1979: Eintracht Braunschweig
- 1980–1982: Darmstadt 98
- 1982–1983: SC Freiburg
- 1983–1985: Karlsruher SC
- 1985–1986: St. Gallen
- 1988: Darmstadt 98
- 1990–1992: Morocco
- 1996–1997: Zamalek
- * Club domestic league appearances and goals

Werner Olk (born 18 January 1938) is a German former professional football player and manager.

== Club career ==
Olk started his football career as a youth player with SG Letter 05 (Hanover region) in 1948 and eventually switched into the youth team of TuS Seelze. Before his transfer to Bayern Munich, he played 1956–57 in the Oberliga Nord with Arminia Hannover and after the relegation of the club from 1957 to 1960 in the second tier, which in this part of Northern Germany was the Amateuroberliga Niedersachsen.

He spent his career in the 1960s through to 1970 with German club Bayern Munich in the Oberliga Süd and the Bundesliga. His honors with Bayern include the DFB-Pokal in 1966, 1967 and 1969; winner of the German Championship in 1969; and winner of the European Cup Winners' Cup in 1967. After the promotion to the Bundesliga in 1965 until 1970, Olk served as Bayern's captain, a function in which he was succeeded by Franz Beckenbauer.

== International career ==
Olk won his only cap for the West Germany national team in 1961. He was an available member of the German squad at the 1962 FIFA World Cup in Chile. In the amateur squad of the Germany national team, Olk was called up three times. He was also called up into the youth national team in 1961 for a match against England.

== Coaching career ==
After his time with Bayern, Olk became player-manager with Swiss second division side FC Aarau. He stayed there until 1973, although he had been relieved of his manager duties by December 1972, and was replaced in this role by Jiří "Georges" Sobotka. Afterwards, Olk became a manager for German clubs such as Eintracht Braunschweig, SV Darmstadt 98 (with which he achieved promotion to the Bundesliga in 1981), SC Freiburg, SC Preußen Münster, and Karlsruher SC (with which he achieved promotion to the Bundesliga in 1984). He also had a brief engagement managing St. Gallen in the Swiss League during the 1985–86 season.

From 1990 to 1992, Olk coached the Morocco national team, with which he qualified for the African Nations Cup in January 1992 and the Olympic Games later in the same year in Barcelona. Morocco remained in both competitions without win. From 1995 to 1997, he was in charge of El Zamalek of Cairo, Egypt, with which he won the African Cup of Champions Clubs of 1996, where they prevailed in the finals over Nigeria's Shooting Stars SC.

Olk also had two spells as assistant coach at Bayern Munich. From 1975 to 1977, he was assisting Dettmar Cramer in a period when the club the European Champions' and Intercontinental Cups of 1977. Between 1986 and 1988, he served under Udo Lattek and Jupp Heynckes, being part of the team that won the German championship of 1987.

== Career statistics ==
Appearances and goals by club, season and competition
Club	Club	League			Cup		Continental		Total	
Club	Club	Division	Apps	Goals	Apps	Goals	Apps	Goals	Apps	Goals
Bayern Munich	Oberliga Süd	1960–61	27	2						
Bayern Munich	Oberliga Süd	1961–62	29	0						
Bayern Munich	Oberliga Süd	1962–63	20	0						
Bayern Munich	Regionalliga Süd	1963–64	17	0						
Bayern Munich	Regionalliga Süd	1964–65	29	0						
Bayern Munich	Bundesliga	1965–66	28	0						
Bayern Munich	Bundesliga	1966–67	32	1						
Bayern Munich	Bundesliga	1967–68	32	0						
Bayern Munich	Bundesliga	1968–69	34	1						
Bayern Munich	Bundesliga	1969–70	18	0						
Career total			266	4						

== Honours ==
=== Manager ===
Zamalek

- African Cup of Champions: 1996
