= Peter Kupferschmidt =

German footballer (1942–2025)

Personal information
- Date of birth: 2 March 1942
- Place of birth: Szentfülöp, Hungary
- Date of death: 18 December 2025 (aged 83)
- Height: 1.75 m (5 ft 9 in)
- Position: Defender

Youth career
- 1956–1960: Bayern Munich

Senior career*
Years	Team	Apps	(Gls)
1960–1971	Bayern Munich	221	(5)
1971–1972	Sturm Graz	27	
1972–1973	Kapfenberger SV		
- * Club domestic league appearances and goals

Peter Kupferschmidt (2 March 1942 – 18 December 2025) was a German footballer who played for Bayern Munich during the 1960s.

== Biography ==
Kupferschmidt's story began in Filipovo, which is now in Serbia and known as Backi Gracac. His family had to flee when he was three years old and ended up in Munich, in Gartenstadt-Trudering. Kupferschmidt felt at home here, and as he had always played football, the sport played a big role in growing up. One day in the summer of 1956, a friend took him to Bayern Munich, and Rudi Weiß became his sponsor.

Kupferschmidt died on 18 December 2025, at the age of 83.
