= Rudolf Nafziger =

German footballer

Personal information
- Date of birth: 11 August 1945
- Place of birth: Gauting, Germany
- Date of death: 13 July 2008 (aged 62)
- Place of death: Gauting, Germany
- Position: Forward

Youth career
- 1961–64: Bayern Munich

Senior career*
Years	Team	Apps	(Gls)
1964–1968	FC Bayern Munich	125	(22)
1968–1970	FC St. Gallen		
1970–1972	Hannover 96	27	(0)
1972–1974	Linzer ASK		

International career
1965	West Germany	1	(0)
1965	West Germany U-23	1	(0)
1966	West Germany B	1	(0)
- * Club domestic league appearances and goals

Rudolf Nafziger (11 August 1945 – 13 July 2008) was a German footballer who was part of the Bayern Munich team of the late-1960s. He won one cap for West Germany, in 1965.
