= Dieter Brenninger =

German footballer (born 1944)

Personal information
- Date of birth: 16 February 1944 (age 82)
- Place of birth: Altenerding, Germany
- Height: 1.74 m (5 ft 9 in)
- Position: Striker

Youth career
- SpVgg Altenerding

Senior career*
Years	Team	Apps	(Gls)
1962–1971	Bayern Munich	276	(127)
1971–1972	Young Boys Bern		
1972–1976	VfB Stuttgart	99	(16)
1976–1977	TSV 1860 Rosenheim		
1977–1978	SpVgg Altenerding		

International career
1969	West Germany	1	(0)
- * Club domestic league appearances and goals

Dieter Brenninger (born 16 February 1944) is a German former professional footballer who played as a striker.

== Life ==
Brenninger was born in Altenerding, and began his career with SpVgg Altenerding. In 1962 he transferred to FC Bayern Munich in the Regionalliga Süd. In 1965 Bayern was promoted into the German Bundesliga. He went on to win the German Cup four times in 1966, 1967, 1969, and 1971. Additionally, Brenninger claimed the German Championship in 1969. His greatest honor was the European Cup Winners' Cup triumph in 1967 over Rangers by a score of 1–0.

He went on to play a total of 190 Bundesliga games for Bayern; scoring a total of 59 goals. In 1972, Brenninger transferred to VfB Stuttgart after a brief stop-over at Young Boys Bern. For VfB he went on to play in 81 Bundesliga games while scoring 15 goals. At the end of his career, Brenninger had a short spell with TSV 1860 Rosenheim before finishing his career at the same place he started it: SpVgg Altenerding.

Dieter "Mucki" Brenninger achieved one cap for the West Germany national team in 1969 against Austria in a World Cup qualifying game. He was later substituted for Georg Volkert although Germany went go on to win the match 1–0.

After he retired from playing football, Brenninger worked in sales for Erdinger.

== Honours ==
- DFB-Pokal: 1965–66, 1966–67, 1968–69, 1970–71
- UEFA Cup Winners' Cup: 1966–67
- Bundesliga: 1968–69
