= Rainer Ohlhauser =

German footballer (born 1941)

Personal information
- Date of birth: 6 January 1941 (age 85)
- Place of birth: Dilsberg, Germany
- Height: 1.78 m (5 ft 10 in)
- Positions: Striker; midfielder

Youth career
- 1958–1961: SV Sandhausen

Senior career*
Years	Team	Apps	(Gls)
1961–1970	Bayern Munich	286	(215)
1970–1975	Grasshoppers	125	(95)
Total		411	(310)

International career
1968	West Germany	1	(0)

Managerial career
- 1975–1976: FC Winterthur
- 1982–1983: FC Basel
- * Club domestic league appearances and goals

Rainer Ohlhauser (born 6 January 1941) is a German former footballer who played as a striker during the 1960s and 1970s.

== Career ==
Born in Dilsberg, Rhein-Neckar-Kreis, Ohlhauser began his career with SV Sandhausen in 1958 before moving to FC Bayern Munich in 1961. He had enormous success at Bayern, playing almost three hundred matches and scoring 186 goals. He also won a number of trophies, including the UEFA Cup Winners' Cup in 1967 and the Bundesliga in 1969. In 1970, he signed for Grasshopper Club Zürich of the Swiss Super League, switching position to midfielder. He retired after five years with Grasshoppers and also went on to manage FC Winterthur and FC Basel between 1982 and 1983.

Despite his scoring record, he picked up just one international cap for West Germany, in 1968.

== Honours ==
Bayern Munich

- UEFA Cup Winners' Cup: 1966–67
- Bundesliga: 1968–69; runner-up 1969–70
- DFB-Pokal: 1965–66, 1966–67, 1968–69
