= FIFA Player of the Century =

One-off award by FIFA

FIFA Player of the Century was a one-off award created by FIFA to decide the greatest football player of the 20th century, announced at the annual FIFA World gala, held in Rome on 11 December 2000. Diego Maradona and Pelé were joint winners of the award.

== Background ==
Since 1991, FIFA has had awards for FIFA World Player of the Year and they decided to bring in the year 2000 by conducting a public vote to decide the FIFA Player of the Century. This was to be decided by votes on their official website, their official magazine, and a grand jury. Maradona won the Internet-based poll by wide margins, garnering 53.6% of the votes against 18.53% for Pelé. Many observers complained that the Internet nature of the poll would have meant a skewed demographic of younger fans who would have seen Maradona play, but not Pelé.

As a result, FIFA decided to add a second poll and appointed a "Football Family" committee composed of football journalists, officials, and coaches (50%), and also a voting from the FIFA Magazine subscribers (50%) who voted Pelé the best player of the century with an overall 72.75% of the vote. Thus both were joint winners of the award.

== Results ==
=== FIFA Internet vote ===
The results of FIFA's Internet poll were as follows: 27 players were voted. Diego Maradona led the poll with 78,000 votes ahead of Pelé on 26,000.

Rank	Player	Nationality	Percentage
1	Diego Maradona	Argentina	53.60%
2	Pelé	Brazil	18.53%
3	Eusébio	Portugal	6.21%
4	Roberto Baggio	Italy	5.42%
5	Romário	Brazil	1.69%
6	Marco van Basten	Netherlands	1.57%
7	Ronaldo	Brazil	1.55%
8	Franz Beckenbauer	Germany	1.50%
9	Zinedine Zidane	France	1.34%
10	Rivaldo	Brazil	1.19%
11	Zico	Brazil	1.15%
12	Garrincha	Brazil	1.08%
13	Johan Cruyff	Netherlands	0.87%
14	Alfredo Di Stéfano	Argentina; Spain	0.68%
15	Michel Platini	France	0.58%
16	Bobby Charlton	England	0.39%
17	Ferenc Puskás	Hungary	0.37%
18	Lothar Matthäus	Germany	0.37%
19	Lev Yashin	Soviet Union	0.36%
20	George Best	Northern Ireland	0.32%
21	Dino Zoff	Italy	0.24%
22	Didi	Brazil	0.22%
23	Stanley Matthews	England	0.18%
24	George Weah	Liberia	0.18%
25	Bobby Moore	England	0.17%
26	Just Fontaine	France	0.13%
27	Gerd Muller	Germany	0.11%

=== FIFA Magazine and Grand Jury vote ===
This part of the award was decided by the FIFA Magazine readers vote and the FIFA Grand Jury. Both the FIFA Magazine and the Football Committee's results were multiplied by 50% for the overall percentages of the two separate procedures.

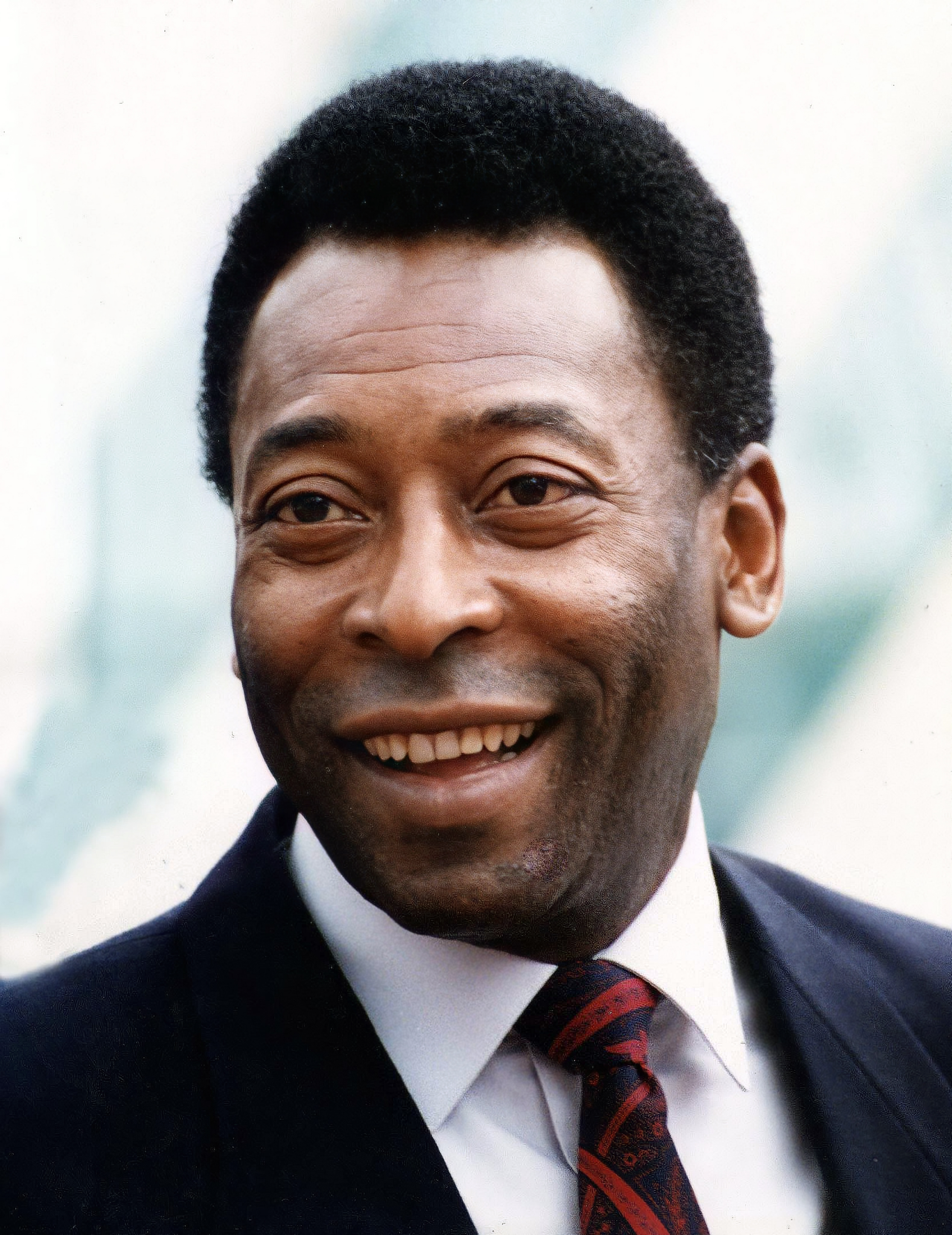
Pelé was the overall winner (FIFA Magazine and Grand Jury vote).

Rank	Player	Nationality	Combined Percentage
1	Pelé	Brazil	72.75%
2	Alfredo Di Stéfano	Argentina; Spain	9.75%
3	Diego Maradona	Argentina	6.0%
4	Franz Beckenbauer	Germany	2.5%
5	Johan Cruyff	Netherlands	2.0%
5	George Best	Northern Ireland	2.0%
7	Roberto Baggio	Italy	1.0%
7	Garrincha	Brazil	1.0%
7	Zico	Brazil	1.0%
7	Michel Platini	France	1.0%
7	Gerd Müller	Germany	1.0%

==== FIFA Committee ====
The Football Committee (or Grand Jury) consisted of a group of experts who voted for the best player and the results were multiplied by 50%. Only Pele and Alfredo Di Stéfano received votes.

Rank	Player	Nationality	Percentage
1	Pelé	Brazil	87.50%
2	Alfredo Di Stéfano	Argentina; Spain	12.50%

==== FIFA Magazine ====
The FIFA Magazine readers voted in a separate poll contributing 50% to the final result of the FIFA Magazine and Grand jury vote, with Pele as the winner.

Rank	Player	Nationality	Percentage
1	Pelé	Brazil	58%
2	Diego Maradona	Argentina	12%
3	Alfredo Di Stéfano	Argentina; Spain	7.0%
4	Franz Beckenbauer	Germany	5.0%
5	Johan Cruyff	Netherlands	4.0%
5	George Best	Northern Ireland	4.0%
7	Roberto Baggio	Italy	2.0%
7	Garrincha	Brazil	2.0%
7	Zico	Brazil	2.0%
7	Michel Platini	France	2.0%
7	Gerd Müller	Germany	2.0%

== FIFA All-time no. 10 ==
On March 7, 2014, FIFA's magazine, the FIFA Weekly published a list of the best players in history that wore the iconic number 10 shirt. All players apart from Lionel Messi were retired and had played in the 20th Century. It was the FIFA Weekly's issue #20 and the results were as below:

Rank	Player	Nationality
1	Pelé	Brazil
2	Diego Maradona	Argentina
3	Zinedine Zidane	France
4	Ferenc Puskás	Hungary
5	Michel Platini	France
6	Roberto Rivellino	Brazil
7	Lionel Messi	Argentina
8	Lothar Matthäus	Germany
9	Roberto Baggio	Italy
10	Gheorghe Hagi	Romania
11	Mario Kempes	Argentina

== See also ==
- FIFA World Team of the 20th Century
- FIFA 100
- FIFA World Cup Dream Team
