= FIFA World Cup Dream Team =

Football fantasy team

The FIFA World Cup Dream Team is an all-time FIFA World Cup all-star team published by FIFA in 2002 after conducting an internet poll of fans to select a World Cup dream team. It was announced on 18 June 2002 during the 2002 FIFA World Cup.

== Background ==
After publishing the World Team of the 20th Century including the continental selections just before the 1998 FIFA World Cup in France, FIFA decided to release an XI about the best players featured in a World Cup from 1930 until 2002. It was the second time that FIFA organized an Internet poll after the FIFA Player of the Century poll in 2000. The result of the XI would be announced during the 2002 FIFA World Cup in Korea and Japan.

== Poll ==
More than one-and-a-half million fans worldwide voted in the poll, conducted by the official FIFA website, www.FIFAworldcup.com, with Diego Maradona of Argentina receiving 111,035 the most votes of every player. Brazil's Pelé, who played for three World Cup-winning teams, won 107,539 votes, 1974 World Cup Champion with West Germany Franz Beckenbauer received 81,442 and Zinedine Zidane who scored twice for France in their 1998 triumph, came in fourth with 80,527. It was the second time in two years that Maradona would beat Pele in an internet worldwide poll.

Top 5 by votes

| Rank | Player | Nationality | Votes |
|---|---|---|---|
| 1 | Diego Maradona | Argentina | 111,035 |
| 2 | Pelé | Brazil | 107,539 |
| 3 | Franz Beckenbauer | Germany | 81,442 |
| 4 | Zinedine Zidane | France | 80,527 |
| 5 | Paolo Maldini | Italy | 58,523 |

FIFA Goal of the century
Diego Maradona's second goal against England in their 1986 quarter-final was also voted the FIFA goal of the century.

== Selection ==
It is an eleven-member side divided as one goalkeeper, three defenders, four midfielders, and three forwards (3–4–3 formation). The XI includes three defenders with left-back Paolo Maldini chosen as a right back.

3–4–3 formation

| Player | Career playing position | National side(s) Years represented | Votes |
|---|---|---|---|
| Lev Yashin | Goalkeeper | Soviet Union; 1958, 1962, 1966, 1970 | 24,587 |
| Paolo Maldini | Left-back and central defender | Italy; 1990, 1994, 1998, 2002 | 58,523 |
| Franz Beckenbauer | Central defender | West Germany; 1966, 1970, 1974 | 81,442 |
| Roberto Carlos | Left-back defender | Brazil; 1998, 2002, 2006 | 58,200 |
| Roberto Baggio | Second striker, or as an attacking midfielder | Italy; 1990, 1994, 1998 | 55,625 |
| Zinedine Zidane | Attacking midfielder | France; 1998, 2002, 2006 | 80,527 |
| Michel Platini | Advanced midfield playmaker | France; 1978, 1982, 1986 | 53,783 |
| Diego Maradona | Attacking midfielder or as a second striker | Argentina; 1982, 1986, 1990, 1994 | 111,035 |
| Romário | Striker | Brazil; 1990, 1994 | 29,480 |
| Johan Cruyff | Forward or attacking midfielder | Netherlands; 1974 | 53,645 |
| Pelé | Forward or attacking midfielder | Brazil; 1958, 1962, 1966, 1970 | 107,539 |

== See also ==
- FIFA 100
- FIFA World Cup awards
- World Team of the 20th Century
