= World Team of the 20th Century =

Team of the best football players

The World Team of the 20th Century or MasterCard 20th Century team (as it was sponsored by MasterCard) was chosen in 1998 to honour the best association football players of the 20th century. The team was consisted of an eleven-member side, with one goalkeeper, four defenders, three midfielders, and three forwards (4–3–3 formation).

4–3–3 formation

== History ==
The team was announced on 10 June 1998, in conjunction with the opening ceremonies of the 1998 FIFA World Cup in France. The team was selected in plurality voting undertaken by a panel of 250 international football journalists from amongst the members of eleven-member sides styled as the South American and European Teams of the 20th Century. Those two continental selections were announced a month earlier by the same panel, featuring players who represented national teams of the CONMEBOL and UEFA confederations and would be the pool for the World selection. That meant that no player from outside Europe or South America was eligible for selection for the World Team.

Selection teams for players from the nations of CONCACAF, the Confederation of African Football, and collectively the Asian and Oceania Football Confederations were also chosen by separate, smaller juries of journalists situated respectively in North and Central America, Africa, and Asia and Oceania. They were announced alongside the European and South American teams, but players selected to the former sides were not considered for selection to the world team.

The continental selection All the team selections were sponsored by MasterCard and announced on 15 May 1998.

== Continental selections ==
FIFA also published the best XIs of the Century for CONCACAF, UEFA, Africa and the Asian and Oceania Football Confederations. MasterCard sponsored the team selections which were announced on 15 May 1998. The first two selections (UEFA, CONMEBOL) worked as the pool for choosing the World's Best Eleven.

=== Pool for the World Selection ===
Continent	Goalkeeper	Defenders	Midfielders	Forwards
Europe	(Soviet Union) Lev Yashin	(West Germany) Franz Beckenbauer (England) Bobby Moore (Italy) Paolo Maldini (Italy) Franco Baresi	(Netherlands) Johan Cruyff (France) Michel Platini (England) Bobby Charlton	(Portugal) Eusebio (Hungary) Ferenc Puskas (Netherlands) Marco Van Basten
South America	(Argentina) Ubaldo Fillol	(Argentina) Daniel Passarella (Brazil) Nilton Santos (Chile) Elías Figueroa (Brazil) Carlos Alberto Torres	(Argentina) Alfredo Di Stéfano (Brazil) Roberto Rivellino (Brazil) Didi	(Brazil) Pelé (Argentina) Diego Maradona (Brazil) Garrincha

=== Rest of the world ===
Continent	Goalkeeper	Defenders	Midfielders	Forwards
CONCACAF	(Mexico) Antonio Carbajal	(United States) Marcelo Balboa (Honduras) Gilberto Yearwood (Canada) Bruce Wilson (Mexico) Gustavo Peña	(Mexico) Ramon Ramirez (El Salvador) Mágico González (United States) Tab Ramos	(Panama) Julio Dely Valdés (Mexico) Hugo Sánchez (Costa Rica) Hernan Medford
Africa	(Cameroon) Thomas N'Kono	(Egypt) Ali Shehata (Egypt) Ibrahim Youssef (Cameroon) Emmanuel Kunde (Democratic Republic of the Congo) Mwepu Ilunga	(Nigeria) Segun Odegbami (Cameroon) Theophile Abega (Ghana) Abedi Pele	(Ivory Coast) Laurent Pokou (Cameroon) Roger Milla (Algeria) Rabah Madjer
Asia/Oceania	(Malaysia) Chow Chee Keong	(South Korea) Kim Ho-kon (Japan) Masami Ihara (Malaysia) Soh Chin Ann	(Taiwan) Cheung Chi Doy (Iran) Karim Bagheri (South Korea) Kim Joo-sung	(Saudi Arabia) Majed Abdullah (Japan) Kunishige Kamamoto (Iran) Khodadad Azizi (South Korea) Cha Bum-kun

== World selection ==
The formation chosen was 4–3–3.

Position	Player	National side(s) represented by year	Professional club(s) represented by year	Rank on the FIFA Magazine and Grand Jury enumeration of the top FIFA players of the 20th century	Continental, FIFA World Cup, IFFHS, and FIFA awards
Goalkeeper	Lev Yashin	Soviet Union (1954–1970)	FC Dynamo Moscow (1949–1971)	Unranked	European Footballer of the Year (1963), UEFA Jubilee Award (Russia); World Cup All-Star Team (1958); FIFA World Cup All-Time Team, FIFA Order of Merit (1988)
Defender (fullback)	Carlos Alberto Torres	Brazil (1964–1977)	Fluminense (1963–1966, 1974–1977); Santos FC (1966–1974); Flamengo (1977); Botafogo (1971); New York Cosmos (1977–1980, 1982); California Surf (1981)	Unranked	FIFA 100; World Cup All-Star Team (1970)
Defender (centre-back)	Franz Beckenbauer	West Germany (1965–1977)	Bayern Munich (1965–1977); New York Cosmos (1977–1980, 1983); Hamburger SV (1980–1982)	4	European Footballer of the Year (1972, 1976); FIFA World Cup Best Young Player Award (1966), FIFA World Cup Bronze Boot (1966), FIFA World Cup Silver Ball (1974); FIFA World Cup All-Star Team (1966, 1970, 1974); FIFA World Cup All-Time Team, FIFA World Cup Dream Team; IFFHS Best European Player 1956–1990; FIFA 100, FIFA Order of Merit (1984, 2004)
Defender (centre-back)	Bobby Moore	England (1962–1973)	West Ham United (1958–1974); Fulham (1974–1977); San Antonio Thunder (1977); Seattle Sounders (1978)	14	UEFA Jubilee Award (England); World Cup All-Star Team (1966), FIFA World Cup All-Time Team, FIFA Order of Merit (1996)
Defender (fullback)	Nílton Santos	Brazil (1949–1963)	Botafogo (1949–1965)	Unranked	World Cup All-Star Team (1958); FIFA 100
Midfielder	Johan Cruyff	Netherlands (1966–1978)	Ajax Amsterdam (1964–1973, 1981–1983); FC Barcelona (1973–1978); Los Angeles Aztecs (1979); Washington Diplomats (1980–1981); Levante UD (1981); Feyenoord (1983–1984)	5	European Footballer of the Year (1971, 1973, 1974), UEFA Jubilee Award (Netherlands); World Cup All-Star Team (1974); FIFA 100, FIFA Order of Merit (2010)
Midfielder	Alfredo Di Stéfano	Argentina (1947); Colombia (1949); Spain (1957–1962)	River Plate (1943–1945, 1947–1949); Huracán (1946–1947); Millonarios (1949–1953); Real Madrid (1953–1964); RCD Espanyol (1964–1966)	2	European Footballer of the Year (1957, 1959), UEFA Jubilee Award (Spain); FIFA 100, FIFA Order of Merit (1994)
Midfielder	Michel Platini	France (1976–1987)	AS Nancy (1972–1979); AS Saint-Étienne (1979–1982); Juventus (1982–1987)	7	European Footballer of the Year (1983, 1984, 1985), Onze d'Or (1983, 1984, 1985); World Cup All-Star Team (1982, 1986); World Soccer Player of the Year (1984, 1985); FIFA 100
Forward	Garrincha	Brazil (1955–1966)	Botafogo (1953–1965); Corinthians (1966); Atlético Junior (1968); Flamengo (1968–1969); Olaria (1972)	7	World Cup Golden Shoe Award (1962), World Cup All-Star Team (1958, 1962)
Forward	Diego Maradona	Argentina (1977–1994)	Argentinos Juniors (1976–1981); Boca Juniors (1981–1982, 1995–1997); FC Barcelona (1982–1984); SSC Napoli (1984–1991); Sevilla FC (1992–1993); Newell's Old Boys (1993)	3	Onze d'Or (1986, 1987), FIFA Player of the Century, South American Footballer of the Year (1979, 1980); World Cup Golden Ball Award (1986), World Cup Bronze Ball Award (1990), FIFA World Cup Silver Shoe (1986), World Cup All-Star Team (1986, 1990); FIFA World Cup Dream Team; World Soccer Player of the Year (1986); Honorary Ballon d'Or (1995); FIFA 100
Forward	Pelé	Brazil (1956–1971)	Santos FC (1956–1974); New York Cosmos (1975–1977)	1	South American Footballer of the Year (1973), World Cup Golden Ball Award (Best Player) (1970), World Cup Silver Ball (1958), World Cup Best Young Player (1958), World Cup All-Star Team (1958, 1970), FIFA World Cup All-Time Team, FIFA Player of the Century, IFFHS Player of the Century, Player of the Century by France Football's Ballon d'Or Winners, FIFA Ballon d'Or Prix d'Honneur (2013), FIFA 100, FIFA Order of Merit (1984, 2004); Athlete of the Century by International Olympic Committee

== See also ==
- FIFA World Cup Dream Team
- FIFA 100
- FIFA World Cup awards
- FIFA Player of the Century
- World Soccer's Greatest Players of the 20th Century
- IFFHS:The World Team

== Sources ==
- Brown, Gerry, and Morrison, Michael (eds.; 2003). ESPN Information Please Sports Almanac. New York City: ESPN Books and Hyperion (joint). ISBN 0-7868-8715-X.
