= Carlos Alberto Torres =

Brazilian footballer and manager (1944–2016)

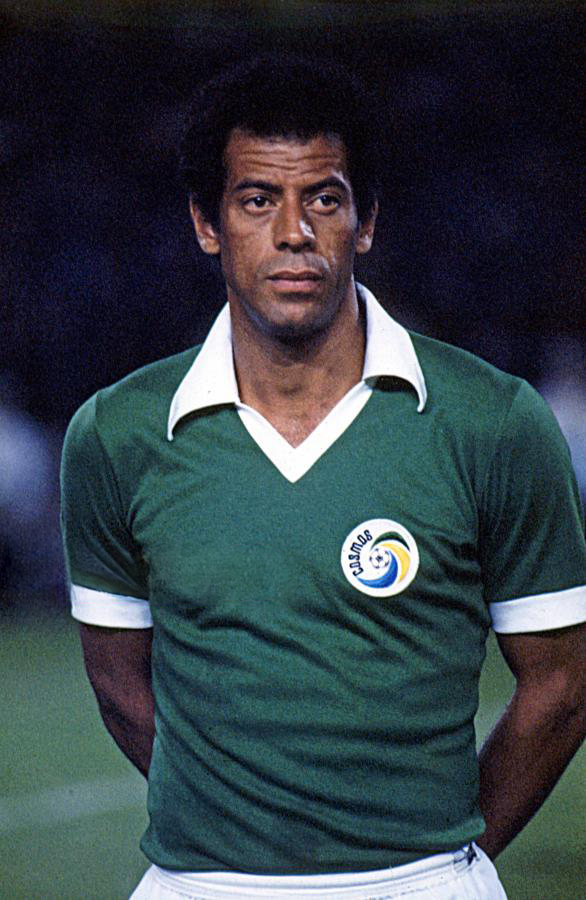
- Carlos Alberto with the NY Cosmos in 1978

Personal information
- Full name: Carlos Alberto Torres
- Date of birth: 17 July 1944
- Place of birth: Imperial de São Cristóvão, Rio de Janeiro, Brazil
- Date of death: 25 October 2016 (aged 72)
- Place of death: Rio de Janeiro, Brazil
- Height: 1.80 m (5 ft 11 in)
- Positions: Right-back; centre-back

Senior career*
| Years | Team | Apps | (Gls) |
| 1963–1966 | Fluminense | 98 | (9) |
| 1966–1974 | Santos | 445 | (40) |
| 1971 | Botafogo | 22 | (0) |
| 1974–1976 | Fluminense | 50 | (4) |
| 1976–1977 | Flamengo | 28 | (3) |
| 1977–1980 | New York Cosmos | 80 | (6) |
| 1981 | California Surf | 19 | (2) |
| 1982 | New York Cosmos | 20 | (0) |
| Total | | 743 | (64) |

International career
| 1963 | Brazil Olympic | 4 | (0) |
| 1964–1977 | Brazil | 53 | (8) |

Managerial career
- 1983–1985: Flamengo
- 1985–1986: Corinthians
- 1987–1988: Náutico
- 1988: Miami Sharks
- 1989–1990: Once Caldas
- 1991–1992: Monterrey
- 1992: Tijuana
- 1993–1997: Botafogo
- 1994: Fluminense
- 1998: Atlético Mineiro
- 1998–1999: Querétaro
- 2000–2001: Unión Magdalena
- 2000–2001: Oman
- 2001–2002: Flamengo
- 2002: Botafogo
- 2004–2005: Paysandu
- 2005: Azerbaijan
Medal record
Men's Football
Representing Brazil
Pan American Games
| Winner | 1963 São Paulo |
FIFA World Cup
| Winner | 1970 Mexico |
- * Club domestic league appearances and goals

Carlos Alberto "Capita" Torres (17 July 1944 – 25 October 2016), also known as "o Capitão do Tri", was a Brazilian football player and manager who played as an attacking right-sided full-back or wing-back. A technically gifted defender with good ball skills and defensive capabilities, he is widely regarded as one of the greatest defenders of all time. He also stood out for his leadership, and was an excellent penalty taker. Nicknamed O Capitão, he captained the Brazil national team to victory in the 1970 World Cup, scoring the fourth goal in the final, considered one of the greatest goals in the history of the tournament.

Carlos Alberto was a member of the World Team of the 20th Century, and in 2004 was named by Pelé in the FIFA 100 list of the world's greatest living players. He was an inductee to the Brazilian Football Museum Hall of Fame, and was a member of the U.S. National Soccer Hall of Fame.

In January 2013, Carlos Alberto was named one of the six Ambassadors of 2014 FIFA World Cup in Brazil, others being Ronaldo, Bebeto, Mário Zagallo, Amarildo and Marta.

== Personal life ==
Carlos Alberto was born in Rio de Janeiro in 1944. He had a twin brother, Carlos Roberto, who died one month before him in 2016. Carlos Alberto was married three times: with Sueli (mother of his children Andréa and Alexandre Torres, also a player), with the actress Teresinha Sodré and with Graça, his last wife.

== Club career ==
=== Brazil ===
Carlos Alberto joined Fluminense at the age of 19. He made a name for himself in his first season, not only because of his great tackling and reading of the game, but also for his outstanding ball control, dribbling and playmaking abilities, which were quite rare at the time for a defender. In 1966, he moved to Santos, where he became Pelé's teammate. In 1974, he returned to Fluminense and helped the team capture two consecutive Campeonato Carioca championships. In 1977, he moved to Fluminense's arch-rivals Flamengo.

=== NASL ===
In 1977, despite his success in Brazil, Carlos Alberto Torres decided to move to the New York Cosmos. He arrived on the day of the New York City blackout where he was reunited with his friend and partner Pelé and helped the Cosmos capture two consecutive NASL titles in 1977 and 1978. After spending one year with the California Surf, he returned to the Cosmos in 1982 where he won his third NASL title. He played his farewell game on 28 September 1982 in an exhibition match between the Cosmos and his former club Flamengo. In 119 regular season games and 26 playoff games, Carlos scored a total of 8 goals and was an NASL All-Star five times.

== International career ==
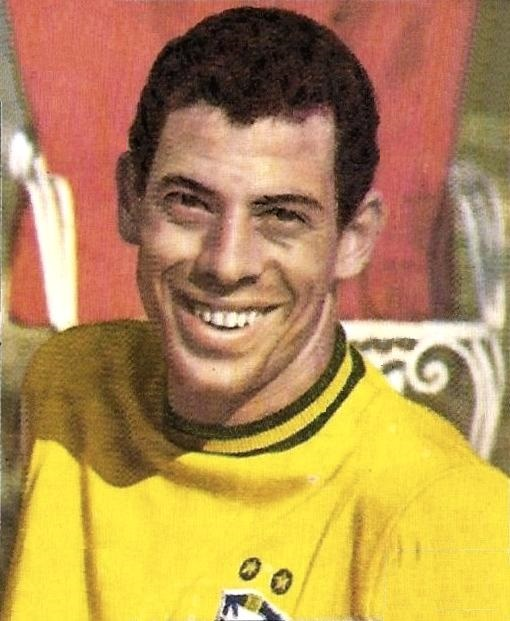
Carlos Alberto with the Brazil national team in 1970

From 1964 to 1977, Carlos Alberto was capped 53 times and scored 8 goals. He was included in the 44-man training squad for the 1966 FIFA World Cup but did not make the final 22. As it turned out, Brazil were knocked out at the Group stage in England, and when João Saldanha was tasked with restoring pride and passion to the seleção, he recognised the leadership ability that Carlos Alberto was consistently demonstrating at Santos, and made him national captain. Thus, Carlos Alberto is remembered holding aloft the Jules Rimet trophy after Brazil secured the cup for good after an impressive victory over Italy in the 1970 FIFA World Cup Final in Mexico City. That squad also included Clodoaldo, Gérson, Jairzinho, Rivellino, Tostão and Pelé. Carlos Alberto's goal against Italy in the final, racing down the right wing and dealing a strong low shot to Enrico Albertosi's left corner after receiving an assist from Pelé, is considered one of the best goals ever scored in the tournament. In 2002 the UK public voted the goal No. 36 in the list of the 100 Greatest Sporting Moments. 1970 would prove to be the only time he would play at that level. He was unable to participate in the 1974 World Cup due to a persistent knee injury. When he eventually regained match fitness, his speed had been compromised. However, his ability to read the game compensated for his loss of pace and when he moved to centre back, he found the form to warrant a recall to the national team. In 1977, he was selected by Claudio Coutinho to captain the national team for the first three qualifiers for the 1978 World Cup. He acquitted himself well despite those being the first competitive internationals he had played for almost seven years. He was approaching 33 years of age and retired from international football, immediately prior to joining New York Cosmos in the NASL. Today he is widely considered one of the finest Brazilian men's footballers of all time.

== Captaincy and leadership ==
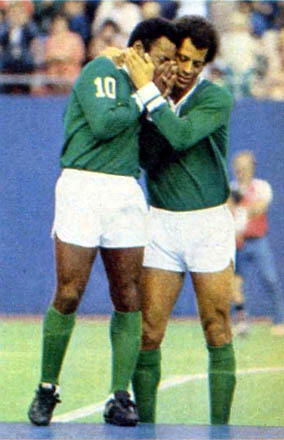
Carlos Alberto (right) with countryfellow Pelé in the New York Cosmos, October 1977

He had a leadership style that spared no one from his criticism - not even Pelé, four years older. Carlos Alberto Torres was not only captain when it came to coin tosses. "Capita" was one of those who asked Zagallo to put Everaldo in place of Marco Antônio, who was then 19 years old and too inexperienced, in the group's opinion.

According to the words of the portal UOL: "loud-mouthed, impulsive and energetic, Carlos Alberto Torres did not enter into discussions half-heartedly". An episode that clearly demonstrates his leadership style occurred in the match in which Brazil beat England national football team 1–0 in the 1970 World Cup. Carlos Alberto abandoned his position only to make a stronger tackle on the English striker Francis Lee, who had kicked Félix in the face. After the play, Lee disappeared from the game.

== Coaching career ==
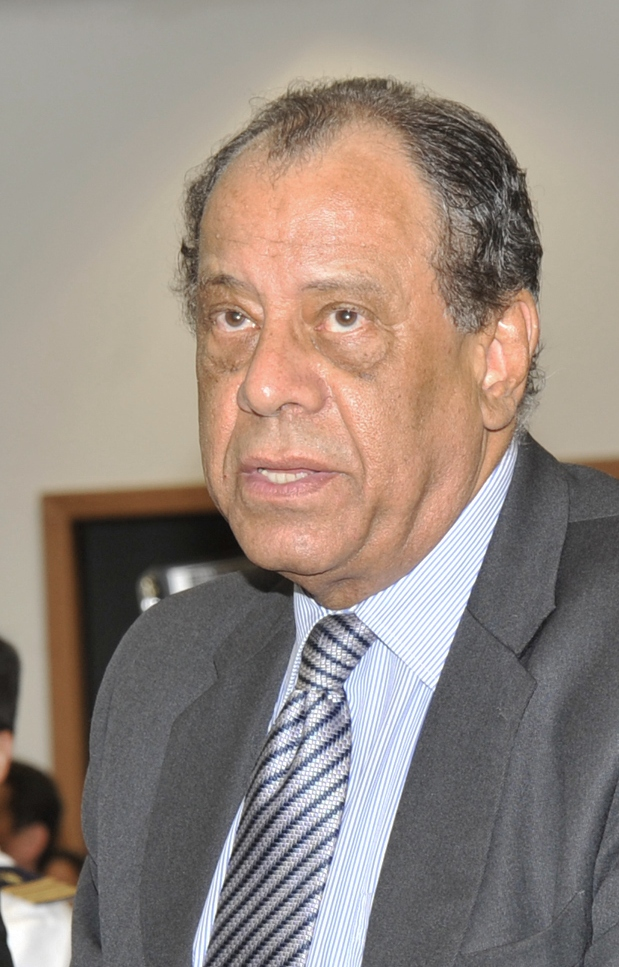
Carlos Alberto in 2011

His career as a football manager started in 1983, when he managed Flamengo. He also managed several other clubs, like Corinthians in 1985 and 1986; Náutico in 1986, 1987 and 1988; Once Caldas on 1989, 1990; Monterrey in 1991, 1992; Club Tijuana in 1992; Fluminense in 1994 and 1995; Botafogo in 1993, 1994, 1997, 1998, 2002 and 2003; Querétaro F.C. in 1999; Unión Magdalena in 2000, 2001; and Paysandu in 2005.

He was also an assistant manager for national teams such as the Nigeria national football team and the Oman national football team. On 14 February 2004, he was appointed manager of the Azerbaijan national football team. He resigned on 4 June 2005 after losing a match against Poland, during which he assaulted the technical referee and ran on the pitch suggesting the referee was bribed.

== Political career ==
In politics, he served in the Municipal Chamber of Rio de Janeiro from 1989 to 1993. In 2008, he ran for vice-mayor of Rio de Janeiro on Paulo Ramos' ticket, but they lost.

== Death ==
Carlos Alberto died in Rio de Janeiro on 25 October 2016 due to a sudden heart attack. He was a sports commentator at a Brazilian channel SporTV, having appeared live in studio only two days before his death, which occurred exactly one month after his twin died.

== Career statistics ==
=== Club ===
Appearances and goals by club, season and competition
| Club | Season | League | | | State League | | National cup | | Continental | | Other | | Total | |
| Club | Season | Division | Apps | Goals | Apps | Goals | Apps | Goals | Apps | Goals | Apps | Goals | Apps | Goals |
|---|---|---|---|---|---|---|---|---|---|---|---|---|---|---|
| Fluminense | 1963 | Série A | 6 | 0 | 0 | 0 | 2 | 0 | 0 | 0 | 0 | 0 | 8 | 0 |
| Fluminense | 1964 | Série A | 9 | 1 | 7 | 3 | 9 | 0 | 5 | 0 | 1 | 0 | 31 | 4 |
| Fluminense | 1965 | Série A | 14 | 0 | 5 | 1 | 11 | 2 | 3 | 0 | 5 | 0 | 39 | 3 |
| Fluminense | 1966 | Série A | 17 | 2 | 2 | 0 | 1 | 0 | 0 | 0 | 0 | 0 | 20 | 2 |
| Fluminense | Total | | 46 | 3 | 14 | 4 | 23 | 2 | 8 | 0 | 6 | 0 | 98 | 9 |
| Santos | 1966 | Série A | 15 | 1 | 7 | 0 | 5 | 1 | 7 | 3 | 14 | 0 | 48 | 5 |
| Santos | 1967 | Série A | 26 | 2 | | | 19 | 2 | 0 | 0 | 11 | 0 | 46 | 4 |
| Santos | 1968 | Série A | 26 | 2 | | | 28 | 0 | 5 | 0 | 0 | 0 | 59 | 2 |
| Santos | 1969 | Série A | 26 | 0 | | | 25 | 2 | 0 | 0 | 4 | 0 | 55 | 2 |
| Santos | 1970 | Série A | 26 | 5 | | | 21 | 0 | 0 | 0 | 2 | 0 | 49 | 5 |
| Santos | 1971 | Série A | 2 | 0 | | | 5 | 1 | 0 | 0 | 6 | 0 | 13 | 1 |
| Santos | 1972 | Série A | 20 | 2 | | | 31 | 4 | 0 | 0 | 7 | 0 | 58 | 6 |
| Santos | 1973 | Série A | 28 | 6 | | | 30 | 5 | 0 | 0 | 0 | 0 | 58 | 11 |
| Santos | 1974 | Série A | 27 | 1 | | | 29 | 3 | 0 | 0 | 3 | 0 | 59 | 4 |
| Santos | Total | | 196 | 19 | 7 | 0 | 193 | 18 | 12 | 3 | 47 | 0 | 445 | 40 |
| Botafogo (loan) | 1971 | Série A | 12 | 0 | 6 | 0 | 4 | | | | | | 22 | 0 |
| Fluminense | 1974 | Série A | 11 | 1 | | | | | | | | | 11 | 1 |
| Fluminense | 1975 | Série A | 16 | 0 | 4 | 0 | | | | | | | 20 | 0 |
| Fluminense | 1976 | Série A | 17 | 3 | 2 | 0 | | | | | | | 19 | 3 |
| Fluminense | Total | | 44 | 4 | 6 | 0 | | | | | | | 50 | 4 |
| Flamengo | 1977 | Série A | 0 | 0 | 7 | 0 | 16 | 3 | 5 | 0 | | | 28 | 3 |
| New York Cosmos (Note: "Cosmos" in 1977–78) | 1977 | NASL | 4 | 0 | | | | | | | | | 4 | 0 |
| New York Cosmos | 1978 | NASL | 25 | 2 | | | | | | | | | 25 | 2 |
| New York Cosmos | 1979 | NASL | 28 | 2 | | | | | | | | | 28 | 2 |
| New York Cosmos | 1980 | NASL | 23 | 2 | | | | | | | | | 23 | 2 |
| New York Cosmos | Total | | 80 | 6 | | | | | | | | | 80 | 6 |
| California Surf | 1981 | NASL | 19 | 2 | | | | | | | | | 19 | 2 |
| New York Cosmos | 1982 | NASL | 20 | 0 | | | | | | | | | 20 | 2 |
| Career total | | | 417 | 34 | 40 | 4 | 236 | 23 | 25 | 3 | 53 | 0 | 762 | 64 |

=== International ===
Appearances and goals by national team and year
| National team | Year | Apps | Goals |
|---|---|---|---|
| Brazil | 1964 | 3 | 0 |
| Brazil | 1965 | 1 | 0 |
| Brazil | 1966 | 3 | 0 |
| Brazil | 1967 | 0 | 0 |
| Brazil | 1968 | 18 | 5 |
| Brazil | 1969 | 9 | 0 |
| Brazil | 1970 | 14 | 2 |
| Brazil | 1971 | 0 | 0 |
| Brazil | 1972 | 1 | 1 |
| Brazil | 1973 | 0 | 0 |
| Brazil | 1974 | 0 | 0 |
| Brazil | 1975 | 0 | 0 |
| Brazil | 1976 | 1 | 0 |
| Brazil | 1977 | 3 | 0 |
| Total | | 53 | 8 |

== Managerial statistics ==
As of 7 March 2026

Managerial record by team and tenure
| Team | Nat | From | To | Record | | | | | | | |
| Team | Nat | From | To | G | W | D | L | GF | GA | GD | Win % |
|---|---|---|---|---|---|---|---|---|---|---|---|
| Botafogo | (Brazil) | 13 May 1993 | 31 December 1997 | 253 | 117 | 68 | 68 | 415 | 295 | +120 | 46.25 |
| Atlético Mineiro | (Brazil) | 31 July 1998 | 30 November 1998 | 25 | 11 | 8 | 6 | 41 | 34 | +7 | 44.00 |
| Career total | | | | 278 | 128 | 76 | 74 | 456 | 329 | +127 | 46.04 |

== Honours ==
=== As a player ===
Fluminense

- Campeonato Carioca: 1964, 1975, 1976
- Taça Guanabara: 1966

Santos

- Recopa Sul-Americana: 1968
- Campeoanato Brasileiro: 1968
- Torneio Rio–São Paulo: 1966
- Paulista Championship: 1965, 1967, 1968, 1969, 1973

New York Cosmos

- NASL Soccer Bowl Championships: 1977, 1978, 1980, 1982

Brazil

- FIFA World Cup: 1970
- Pan American Games: 1963

Individual

- FIFA World Cup All-Star Team: 1970
- World Soccer World XI: 1971
- World Team of the 20th Century: 1998
- National Soccer Hall of Fame: 2003
- FIFA 100: 2004
- The Best of The Best – Player of the Century: Top 50
- Brazilian Football Museum Hall of Fame
- Ballon d'Or Dream Team (Silver): 2020
- IFFHS All-time Men's B Dream Team: 2021

=== As a Manager ===
Flamengo

- Campeonato Brasileiro: 1983

Fluminense

- Campeonato Carioca: 1984

Botafogo

- Copa CONMEBOL: 1993
