= Lev Yashin =

Soviet footballer (1929–1990)

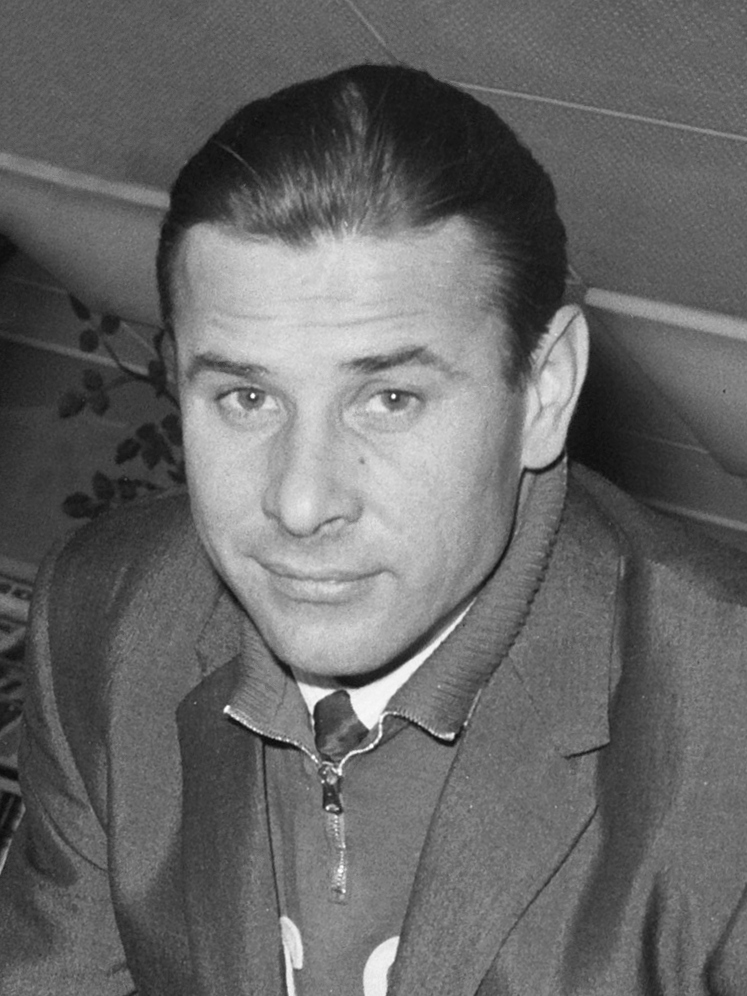
- Yashin in 1965

Personal information
- Full name: Lev Ivanovich Yashin
- Date of birth: 22 October 1929
- Place of birth: Moscow, Soviet Union
- Date of death: 20 March 1990 (aged 60)
- Place of death: Moscow, Soviet Union
- Height: 1.89 m (6 ft 2 in)
- Position: Goalkeeper

Youth career
- 1948–1950: Dynamo Moscow

Senior career*
Years	Team	Apps	(Gls)
1950–1970	Dynamo Moscow	326	(0)

International career
1956	Soviet Union Olympic	6	(0)
1954–1970	Soviet Union	74	(0)
Medal record
Men's football
Representing Soviet Union
Olympic Games
Gold medal – first place	1956 Melbourne	Team
UEFA European Championship
Winner	1960 France
Runner-up	1964 Spain
- * Club domestic league appearances and goals

Lev Ivanovich Yashin (Russian: Лев Иванович Яшин; 22 October 1929 – 20 March 1990) was a Soviet professional footballer who played as a goalkeeper. Widely regarded as the greatest goalkeeper in the history of the sport, he is the only player in his position to win the Ballon d'Or. He was known for his athleticism, positioning, imposing presence in goal, and acrobatic reflex saves. He also served as deputy chairman of the Football Federation of the Soviet Union.

Yashin earned status for revolutionising the goalkeeping position by imposing his authority on the entire defence. A vocal presence in goal, he shouted orders at his defenders, came off his line to intercept crosses and also ran out to meet onrushing attackers, done at a time when goalkeepers spent the entire 90 minutes standing in the goal waiting to be called into action. His performances made an indelible impression on a global audience at the 1958 World Cup, the first to be broadcast internationally. He dressed head to toe in apparent black (in truth very dark blue), thus earning his nicknames "the Black Spider" or "the Black Panther", which enhanced his popularity.

Yashin appeared in three World Cups from 1958 to 1966 and was an unused squad member in 1970. In 2002, he was chosen to the FIFA World Cup Dream Team. In 1994, he was chosen for the FIFA World Cup All-Time Team, and in 1998 was chosen as a member of the World Team of the 20th Century. According to FIFA, Yashin saved over 150 penalty kicks in professional football — more than any other goalkeeper. He also kept over 270 clean sheets in his career, winning a gold medal at the 1956 Olympic football tournament, and the 1960 European Championships.

In 1963, Yashin received the Ballon d'Or, awarded to the European player of the year, the only goalkeeper ever to receive the award. He was additionally named posthumously to the Ballon d'Or Dream Team in 2020, a greatest all-time XI, and was voted the best goalkeeper of the 20th century by the IFFHS. He was also named to the IFFHS All-time Men's Dream Team in 2021. He was named by France Football as the greatest goalkeeper of all time in 2020. In 2025, IFFHS crowned him as the greatest goalkeeper in football history. In November 2003, to celebrate UEFA's Jubilee, he was selected as the Golden Player of Russia by the Russian Football Union as their most outstanding player of the past 50 years. In 2019, France Football established the Yashin Trophy for the best performing goalkeeper in the previous season, and is awarded alongside the Ballon D'Or.

== Early life ==
Lev Ivanovich Yashin was born in Moscow, to a Russian family of industrial workers. When he was 12, World War II forced him to work in a factory to support the Soviet war effort. However his health at the age of 18 (after he suffered a nervous breakdown) meant he was unable to work. Thus, he was sent to work in a military factory in Moscow. After being spotted playing for the factory team he was invited to join the Dynamo Moscow youth team.

== Club career ==
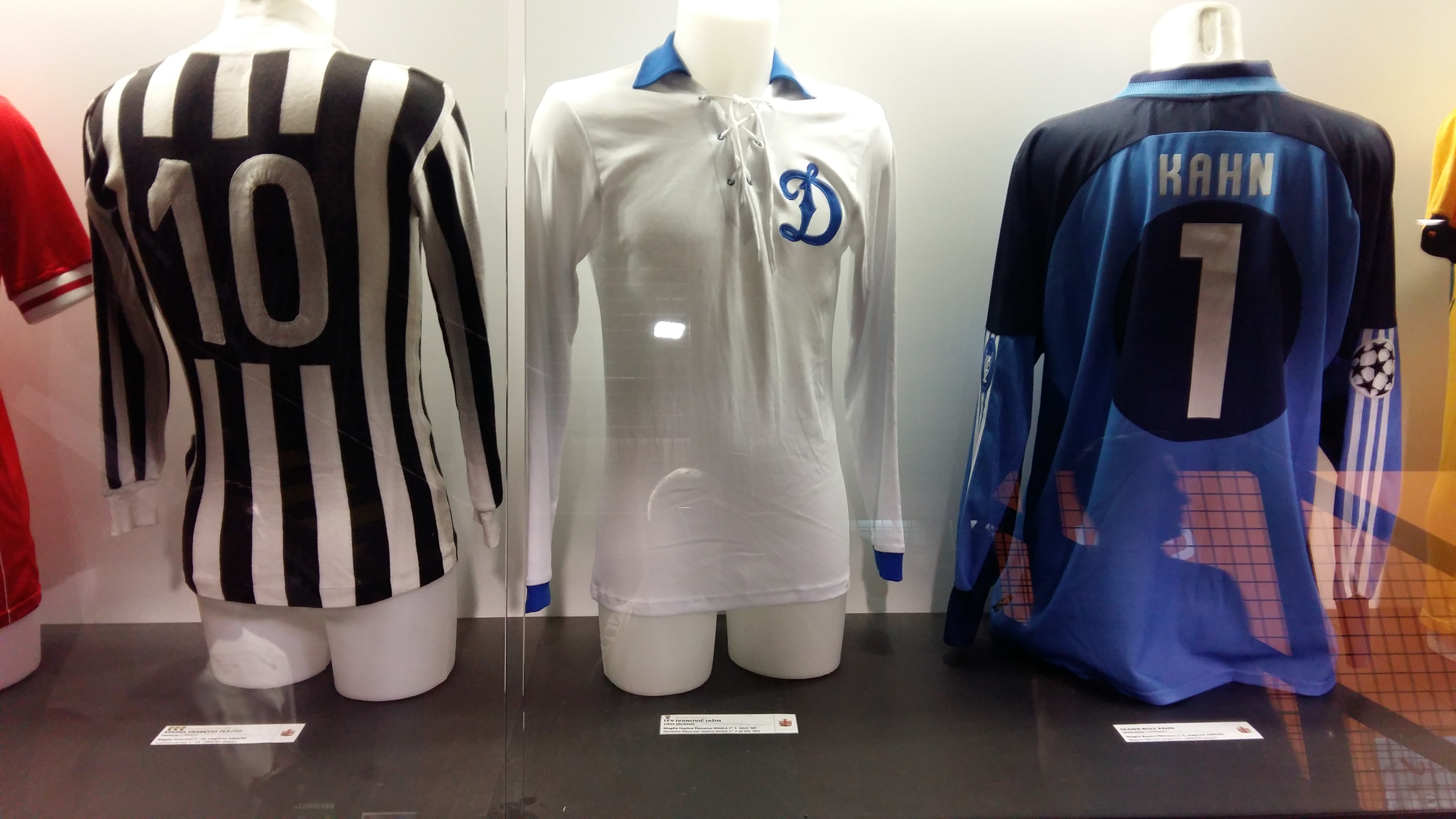
Yashin's Dynamo Moscow jersey (middle), next to that of Michel Platini (left) and Oliver Kahn (right) in the San Siro museum

Yashin’s debut for Dynamo Moscow came in 1950 during a friendly match. It was not the debut he would have hoped for, as he conceded a soft goal scored straight from a clearance by the opposing keeper. That year he played in only two league games, and did not appear in a senior match again until 1953. But he remained determined, and stayed at Dynamo in the reserves waiting for another opportunity. During this period, Yashin also played for Dynamo's ice hockey team as a goaltender, winning the Soviet Ice Hockey Cup in 1953.

He spent his entire professional football career with Dynamo Moscow, from 1950 to 1970, winning the USSR football championship five times and the Soviet Cup three times. Yashin's club teammate, rival and mentor was Alexei "Tiger" Khomich, the keeper of the Soviet national team, who had become famous for his role in Dynamo Moscow’s British tour. He also internally rivalled goalkeeper Valter Sanaya, who left the club in 1953.

== International career ==
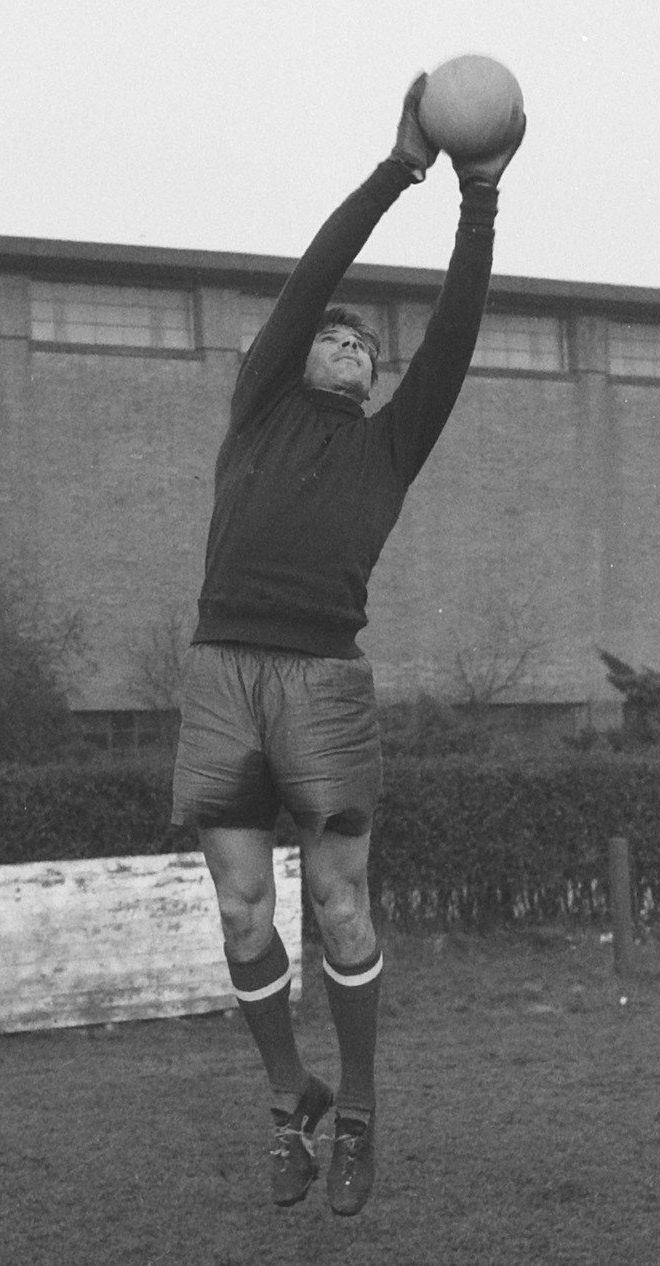
Yashin in 1960

In 1954, Yashin was called up to the Soviet national team, and would go on to gather 74 caps. With the national team he won the 1956 Summer Olympics as well as the inaugural UEFA European Championship in 1960. He also played in three World Cups, in 1958, 1962 and 1966. Yashin is credited with four clean sheets out of the 12 games he played in the World Cup finals.

The 1958 World Cup, played in Sweden, put Yashin on the map for his performances, with the Soviet Union advancing to the quarter-finals. In a group stage match against the eventual Cup winners Brazil, the Soviet team lost 2–0. Facing a Brazil team that featured Garrincha and a 17-year old Pelé in attack, Yashin's performance prevented the score from becoming a rout.

Yashin was nominated for the Ballon d'Or in 1960 and 1961 and placed fifth and fourth, respectively. In 1962, despite suffering two concussions during the tournament, he once again led the team to a quarterfinal finish, before losing to host country Chile. The tournament showed that Yashin was all too human, having made several uncharacteristic mistakes. In the game against Colombia, which the Soviet Union was leading 4–1, Yashin let in a few soft goals, including a goal scored by Marcos Coll directly from a corner kick. It was the first and the only goal scored directly from a corner in FIFA World Cup history. The Soviet Union's game against Colombia finished in a 4–4 draw, and French newspaper L'Équipe predicted the end of Yashin's career.

Despite the disappointment of the 1962 World Cup, Yashin would go on to win the Ballon d'Or in December 1963. One of his most notable performances that year was his appearnce during the 1963 England v Rest of the World football match, where he made a number of spectacular saves. From that point onward, he was known to the world as the "Black Spider" because he wore a distinctive all-black outfit and because it seemed as though he had eight arms to save almost everything. He often played wearing a cloth cap of a burnt-brick colour. Yashin led the Soviet team to its best showing at the FIFA World Cup, a fourth-place finish in the 1966 World Cup held in England.

Yashin made his fourth and last trip to the World Cup finals in 1970, held in Mexico, as the third-choice back-up and an assistant coach. The Soviet team again reached the quarter-finals. In 1971, in Moscow, he played his last match for Dynamo Moscow. Lev Yashin's FIFA testimonial match was held at the Lenin Stadium in Moscow with 100,000 fans attending and a host of football stars, including Pelé, Eusébio and Franz Beckenbauer.

== Personal life and health ==
After retiring from playing, Yashin spent almost 20 years in various administrative positions at Dynamo Moscow. A bronze statue of Lev Yashin was erected at the Dynamo Stadium in Moscow.

In 1986, after he contracted thrombophlebitis while he was in Budapest, Yashin underwent the amputation of one of his legs. He died in 1990 of stomach cancer, despite a surgical intervention in an attempt to save his life. He was given a state funeral as a Soviet Honoured Master of Sport.

Yashin was survived by wife Valentina Timofeyevna and daughters Irina and Elena; when Russia hosted the 2018 FIFA World Cup, Valentina was still living in the Moscow apartment that the Soviet state had given her husband in 1964. Yashin has a granddaughter and one surviving grandson; another grandson died in 2002 at age 14 from injuries suffered in a bicycle accident. The surviving grandson, Vasili Frolov, played as a goalkeeper in Dynamo's youth section and was on the books of the senior side, but never played a game with the senior side, retiring from play at age 23. He now runs a goalkeeper training school in Moscow near Spartak Moscow's current stadium.

== Style of play and accolades ==
"Lev Yashin was first-class, a real super goalkeeper. His positional play was excellent, but everything he did was top-class. He was the model for goalkeeping for the next 10 to 15 years, without a doubt. I visualised myself doing some of the things he was doing, even though I was already playing in the top division I used to learn from him."

— England legend Gordon Banks, voted the second greatest goalkeeper, behind Yashin, of the 20th Century.

Yashin was "the peerless goalkeeper of the century".

— Portugal legend Eusébio.

Considered by many in the sport to be the greatest goalkeeper in the history of the game, Yashin was an imposing presence in goal due to his tall stature, and was highly regarded for his athleticism, agility, positional sense, bravery, and exceptional reflexes, which enabled him to produce acrobatic and spectacular saves. Yashin remains the only goalkeeper to have won the Ballon d'Or, in 1963. He also stopped 151 penalty kicks during his career, more than any other goalkeeper in history, and kept over 270 clean sheets. For his outstanding service to the people and to his country, Yashin was awarded the Order of Lenin in 1967, the highest award of the USSR.

“Yashin revolutionised the role of goalkeeper like no other before him, by always being ready to act as an extra defender” and by “starting dangerous counter-attacks with his positioning and quick throws”.

— France Football, June 2018.

A vocal and authoritative figure between the posts, Yashin is known for revolutionising the goalkeeping position: he shouted orders at his defenders, came off his line to intercept crosses, and also ran out to meet onrushing attackers, done at a time when goalkeepers spent the 90 minutes standing in the goal waiting to be called into action. Yashin would always organise the defensive game of his team, often so fiercely that even his wife accused him of yelling too much on the pitch. He rarely captained his teams, as the later accepted custom of appointing a goalkeeper captain was virtually unheard-of in that era, but his leadership on the field was always evident. Yashin was one of the goalkeepers who began the practice of punching balls out in difficult situations instead of trying to catch them. Other novel practices he developed were the quick throw of the ball to begin a counterattack, coming out of the penalty area to anticipate danger, and the command and organisation of the defenders – practices now quite common among goalkeepers. When asked what his secret was, he would reply that the trick was "to have a smoke to calm your nerves, then toss back a strong drink to tone your muscles."

In 1994, FIFA established the Lev Yashin Award for the best goalkeeper at the World Cup finals. FIFA polls named Yashin as the sole goalkeeper in World Team of the 20th Century. World Soccer magazine named him in their 100 Greatest Players of the 20th century. Many commentators consider Yashin the best goalkeeper in the history of football, which has resulted in him being chosen to be the goalkeeper in most of the world-all-time teams (including the FIFA World Cup All-Time Team and the FIFA Dream Team). In 2020 Yashin was named in the Ballon d'Or Dream Team, a greatest all-time XI.

== Legacy ==
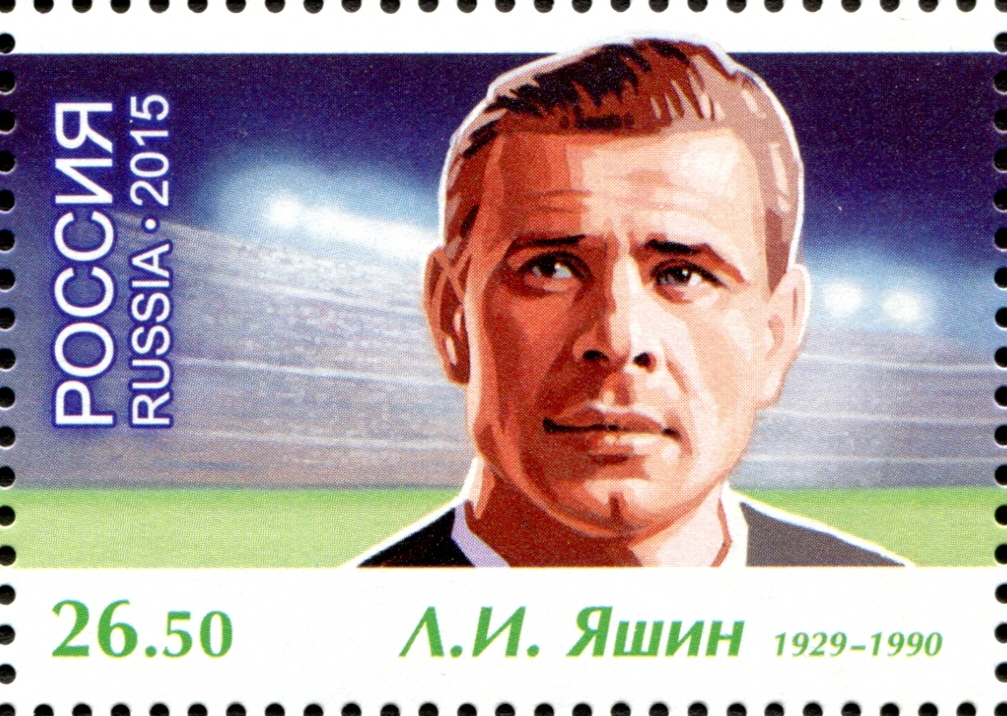
Yashin on a 2016 Russian stamp from the series "Football Legends"

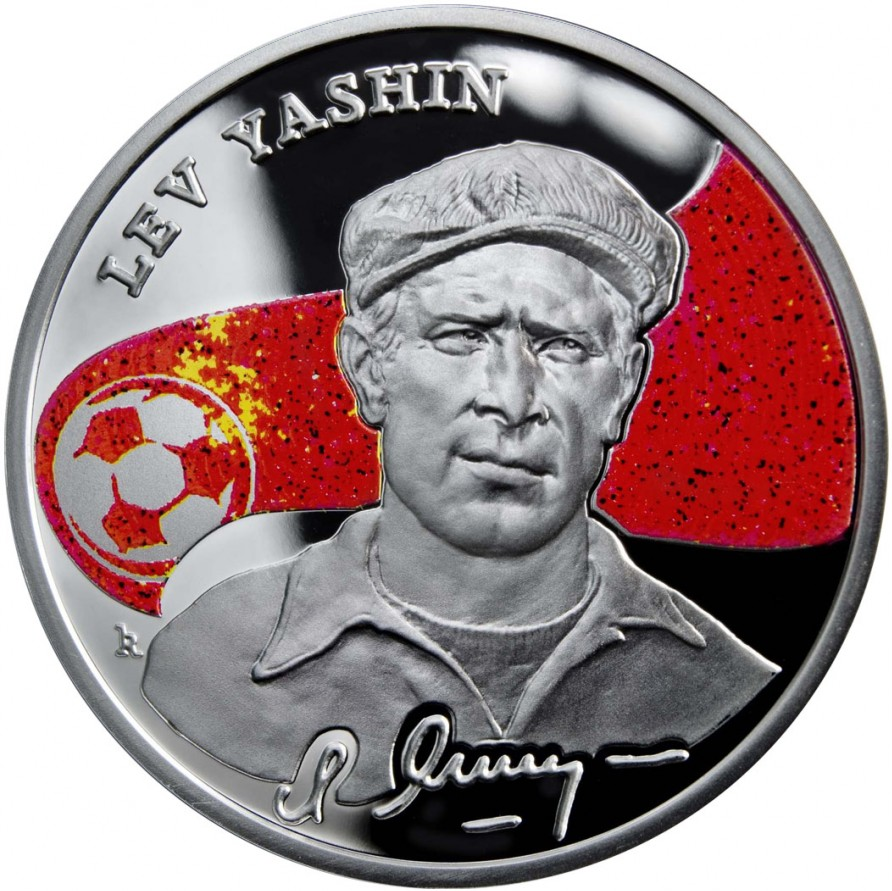
Commemorative coin issued in 2008 by the Central Bank of Armenia

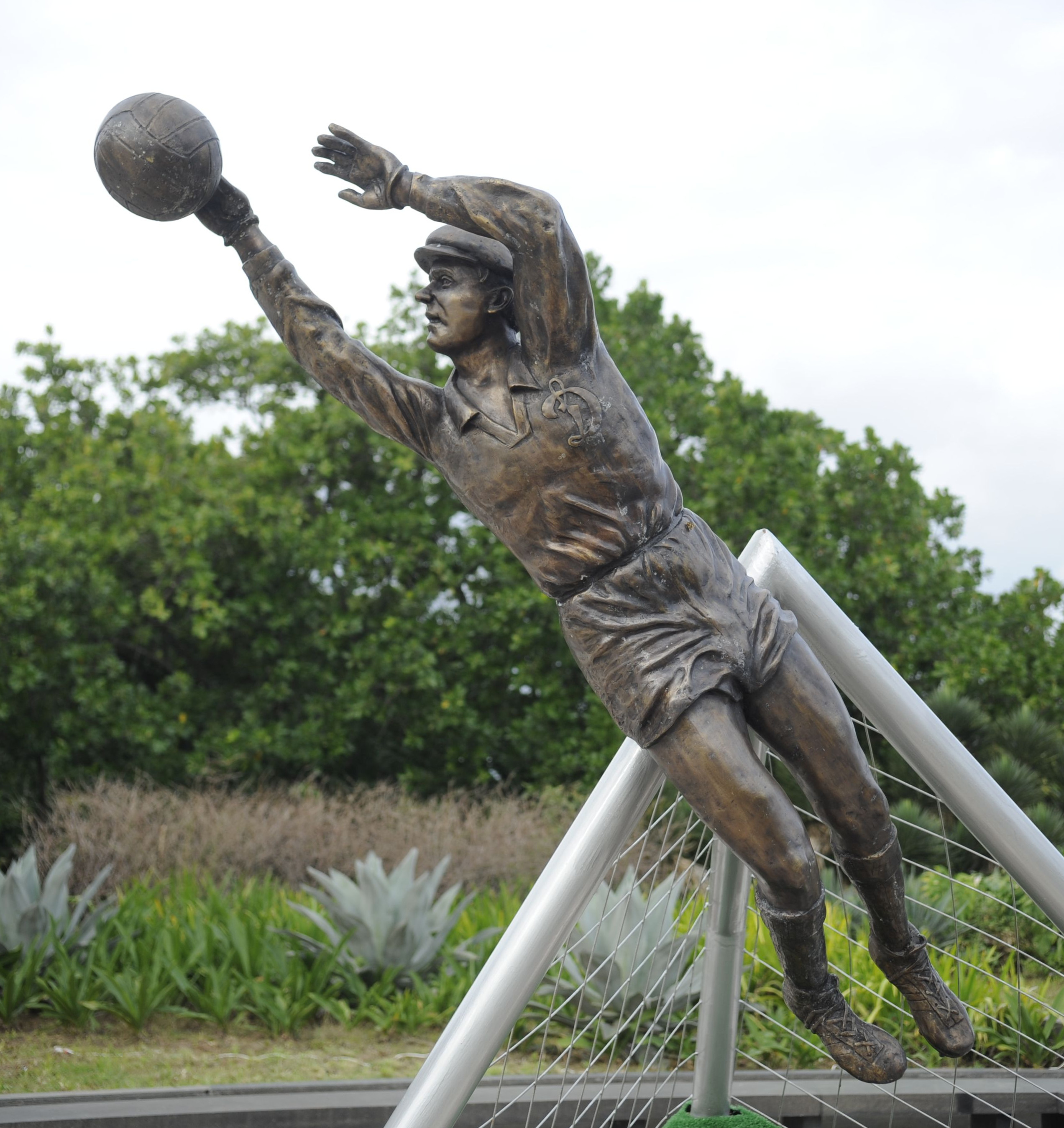
Bronze statue of Yashin in Rio de Janeiro, Brazil

The following works are devoted to Yashin:

- Song "Вратарь" ("Goalkeeper", 1971) by Vladimir Vysotsky.
- Poem "Года летят" ("Years go by") by Robert Rozhdestvensky.
- Poem "Вратарь выходит из ворот" ("Goalkeeper is coming out of the goal", 1974) by Yevgeny Yevtushenko.
- A Russian-language biopic about his life, entitled Lev Yashin: Goalie of My Dreams, was released on 28 November 2019. Its director Oleg Kapanets previously produced Gagarin: First in Space.
- Statues of Yashin were unveiled at both Luzhniki Stadium, in 1997, and Central Dynamo Stadium, in 1999.
- Dynamo Moscow's current stadium, VTB Arena, is officially called Lev Yashin Stadium.
- Several streets are named after Yashin in Russian cities, and there are multiple monuments of Yashin, both in Russia and abroad.
- Yashin features in EA Sports' FIFA football video game series: he was added as an Ultimate Team Icon in FIFA 18, joined by many other legends of the sport.
- In 2018, Yashin appeared on a new 100-ruble commemorative banknote from the Central Bank of Russia celebrating the 2018 FIFA World Cup in the country; he also appeared on the official World Cup poster released in November 2017.

== Ice hockey career ==
Yashin also played ice hockey (also as a goalie) and won the Soviet Cup in March 1953. He was even among the candidates for the country's ice hockey national team, but he stopped playing ice hockey in 1954 to concentrate on his football career.

== Quotes ==
"What kind of a goalkeeper is the one who is not tormented by the goal he has allowed? He must be tormented! And if he is calm, that means the end. No matter what he had in the past, he has no future."

— Lev Yashin.

"The joy of seeing Yuri Gagarin flying in space is only superseded by the joy of a good penalty save."

— Lev Yashin.

"There have only been two world-class goalkeepers. One was Lev Yashin, the other was the German boy who played for Manchester City."

— Lev Yashin on Bert Trautmann.

"I am not the best goalkeeper in the world, it is Vladimir Beara."

— Lev Yashin, upon receiving the Ballon D'Or in 1963.

"Yashin plays football better than me".

— Striker Sandro Mazzola after a 1963 Italy–USSR match, during which Yashin saved his penalty.

== Career statistics ==
=== Club ===
Appearances and goals by club, season and competition
Club	Season	League			Soviet Cup		Total	
Club	Season	Division	Apps	Goals	Apps	Goals	Apps	Goals
Dynamo Moscow	1950	Top League	2	0	0	0	2	0
Dynamo Moscow	1951	Top League	—		—		0	0
Dynamo Moscow	1952	Top League	—		—		0	0
Dynamo Moscow	1953	Top League	13	0	5	0	18	0
Dynamo Moscow	1954	Top League	24	0	1	0	25	0
Dynamo Moscow	1955	Top League	22	0	4	0	26	0
Dynamo Moscow	1956	Top League	19	0	0	0	19	0
Dynamo Moscow	1957	Top League	12	0	0	0	12	0
Dynamo Moscow	1958	Top League	6	0	0	0	6	0
Dynamo Moscow	1959	Top League	19	0	0	0	19	0
Dynamo Moscow	1960	Top League	18	0	2	0	20	0
Dynamo Moscow	1961	Top League	19	0	2	0	21	0
Dynamo Moscow	1962	Top League	17	0	0	0	17	0
Dynamo Moscow	1963	Top League	27	0	2	0	29	0
Dynamo Moscow	1964	Top League	28	0	3	0	31	0
Dynamo Moscow	1965	Top League	20	0	0	0	20	0
Dynamo Moscow	1966	Top League	8	0	0	0	8	0
Dynamo Moscow	1967	Top League	20	0	6	0	26	0
Dynamo Moscow	1968	Top League	17	0	2	0	19	0
Dynamo Moscow	1969	Top League	22	0	2	0	24	0
Dynamo Moscow	1970	Top League	13	0	3	0	16	0
Career total			326	0	32	0	358	0

=== International ===
Appearances and goals by national team and year
National team	Year	Apps	Goals
Soviet Union	1954	2	0
Soviet Union	1955	4	0
Soviet Union	1956	10	0
Soviet Union	1957	5	0
Soviet Union	1958	6	0
Soviet Union	1959	2	0
Soviet Union	1960	5	0
Soviet Union	1961	5	0
Soviet Union	1962	7	0
Soviet Union	1963	4	0
Soviet Union	1964	7	0
Soviet Union	1965	5	0
Soviet Union	1966	7	0
Soviet Union	1967	5	0
Total		74	0

=== Other statistics ===
- 812 career games played
- estimated to have made over 150 penalty saves during his career
- 326 games played for Dynamo Moscow main line-up (football team)
- 74 caps for the USSR national team (70 goals conceded)
- 12 caps at the World Cup (4 clean sheets)
- 2 FIFA 'Best of the World XI' appearances (in 1963 vs England, in 1968 vs Brazil)
- 270 career clean sheets

== Honours ==
=== Football ===
Dynamo Moscow

- Soviet Top League: 1954, 1955, 1957, 1959, 1963
- Soviet Cup: 1953, 1966–67, 1970; runner-up: 1955

Soviet Union

- Olympic Gold Medal: 1956
- UEFA European Football Championship: 1960; runner-up: 1964

Individual

- UEFA European Championship Team of the Tournament: 1960, 1964
- USSR Goalkeeper of the year: 1960, 1963, 1966
- Ballon d'Or Winner: 1963, nominated: 1956, 1957, 1958, 1959, 1960, 1961, 1964, 1965, 1966
- World Soccer World XI: 1963, 1964, 1966, 1967
- FIFA XI: 1963, 1968
- ADN Eastern European Footballer of the Season: 1963
- Europe XI: 1964, 1964, 1965
- European football Oscars: 1963-64
- World XI selected by Italian press. 1960, 1961
- FUWO European Team of the Year: 1965, 1966
- Order of Lenin
- Silver Olympic Order
- FIFA Order of Merit
- Placar's All-Time Team
- Placar's 100 Stars of the Century: #11
- FIFA World Cup All-Time Team
- Planète Foot's All-Time Team
- France Football's Football Player of the Century: #10
- Planète Foot's 50 Best Players of all Time
- Venerdì's All-Time Team
- Venerdì's 100 Magnificent
- World Soccer's 100 Greatest Footballers of All Time: #11
- World Team of the 20th Century
- Voetbal International's Team of the Century
- Voetbal International's World Stars by Raf Willems
- Jornal A Tarde All-Time Team
- Placar's 100 Stars of the World Cup: #23
- O Estado de São Paulo All-Time Team
- World Hall of Fame of Soccer
- France Football Greatest Goalkeeper of All Time
- FIFA Goalkeeper of the 20th Century
- FIFA World Cup Dream Team
- Golden Player of Russia
- World Soccer Greatest XI of all time
- World Sports dream team of the past 20 years: 1970
- IFFHS Legends
- IFFHS World Goalkeeper of the Century
- IFFHS European Goalkeeper of the Century
- Ballon d'Or Dream Team
- IFFHS All-time Men's Dream Team
- IFFHS All-time Europe Men's Dream Team
- IFFHS Men Team of the Century (1901–2000)
- Football Hall of Fame: 2011 Class
- International Football Hall of Fame: 22nd place (1997)

=== Ice hockey ===
Dynamo Moscow

- Soviet Cup: 1953

== See also ==
- List of one-club men in association football
- Lev Yashin Club
