= Franz Beckenbauer =

German footballer (1945–2024)

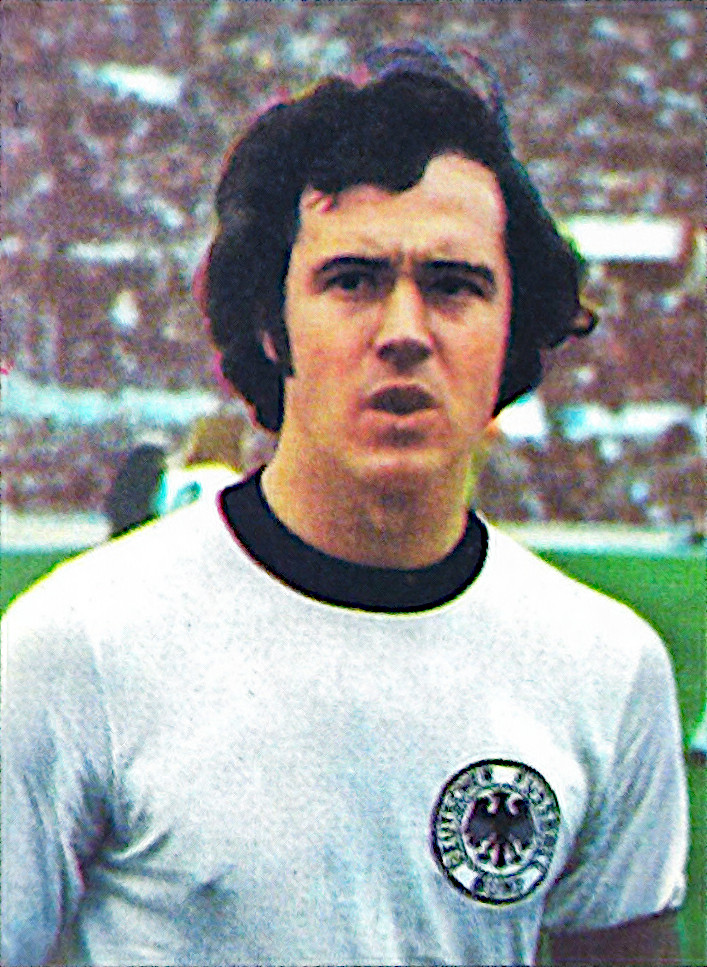
- Beckenbauer with West Germany in 1975

Personal information
- Full name: Franz Anton Beckenbauer
- Date of birth: 11 September 1945
- Place of birth: Munich, Germany
- Date of death: 7 January 2024 (aged 78)
- Place of death: Salzburg, Austria
- Height: 1.81 m (5 ft 11 in)
- Positions: Defender; sweeper

Youth career
- 1951–1959: SC 1906 München
- 1959–1964: Bayern Munich

Senior career*
| Years | Team | Apps | (Gls) |
| 1964–1977 | Bayern Munich | 427 | (60) |
| 1977–1980 | New York Cosmos | 80 | (17) |
| 1980–1982 | Hamburger SV | 28 | (0) |
| 1983 | New York Cosmos | 25 | (2) |
| Total | | 560 | (79) |

International career
| 1964 | West Germany Youth | 3 | (3) |
| 1965 | West Germany B | 2 | (0) |
| 1965–1977 | West Germany | 103 | (14) |

Managerial career
- 1984–1990: West Germany
- 1990: Marseille
- 1993–1994: Bayern Munich
- 1996: Bayern Munich
Medal record
Men's football
Representing West Germany (as player)
FIFA World Cup
| Winner | 1974 |
| Runner-up | 1966 |
| Third place | 1970 |
UEFA European Championship
| Winner | 1972 |
| Runner-up | 1976 |
Representing West Germany (as manager)
FIFA World Cup
| Winner | 1990 |
| Runner-up | 1986 |
UEFA European Championship
| Third place | 1988 |
Signature
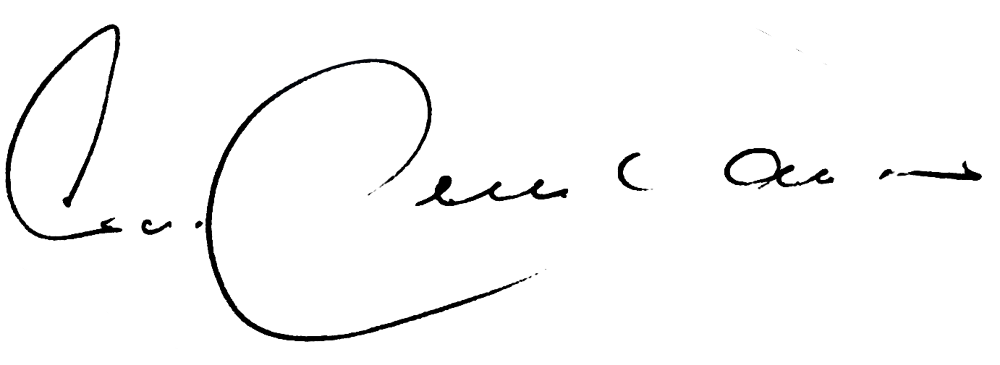
- * Club domestic league appearances and goals

Franz Anton Beckenbauer (German pronunciation: [fʁants ˈbɛkn̩ˌbaʊɐ]; 11 September 1945 – 7 January 2024) was a German professional football player, manager, and official. Nicknamed der Kaiser ("the Emperor"), he is widely regarded as one of the greatest and most influential players of all time. Beckenbauer was a versatile player who started out as a midfielder, but made his name as a centre-back. He is often credited as having invented the role of the modern sweeper (libero).

Twice named European Footballer of the Year, Beckenbauer appeared 103 times for West Germany, playing in three FIFA World Cups and two European Championships. He is one of eleven players to have won the FIFA World Cup, the European Cup, and the Ballon d'Or. He is one of three men, along with Brazil's Mário Zagallo and France's Didier Deschamps, to have won the World Cup as a player and as a manager; he lifted the World Cup trophy as captain in 1974, and repeated the feat as a manager in 1990. He was the first captain to lift the World Cup and European Championship at the international level and the European Cup at the club level. He was named in the World Team of the 20th Century in 1998, the FIFA World Cup Dream Team in 2002, the Ballon d'Or Dream Team in 2020, and the IFFHS All-time Men's Dream Team in 2021, and in 2004 was listed in the FIFA 100 of the world's greatest living players. In August 2024, the International Sports Press Association (AIPS) voted him as the third best footballer of the past 100 years after Pelé and Diego Maradona.

At club level with Bayern Munich, Beckenbauer won the European Cup Winners' Cup in 1967 and three consecutive European Cups from 1974 to 1976. The latter feat made him the first player to win three European Cups as captain of his club. He became team manager and later president of Bayern Munich. After two spells with the New York Cosmos he was inducted into the US National Soccer Hall of Fame.

Beckenbauer led Germany's successful bid to host the 2006 FIFA World Cup and chaired the organizing committee. He worked as a pundit for Sky Germany, and for 34 years as a columnist for the tabloid Bild, both until 2016. Beginning August 2016, he was investigated for fraud and money laundering in connection with the 2006 World Cup. The investigation was closed without a verdict in 2020 as the period for bringing a charge under the statute of limitations had expired.

== Early life ==
Franz Anton Beckenbauer was born on 11 September 1945 at a clinic in the Maxvorstadt borough of Munich, the second son of postal-worker Franz Beckenbauer Sr. (1905–1977) and his wife Antonie (née Hupfauf; 1913–2006). He was the youngest of two children, his older brother Walter having been born in 1941, and grew up in the working-class district of Giesing. Beckenbauer was raised as a Roman Catholic, and was an altar boy in the Munich-Obergiesing parish. Despite his father's cynicism about the game, Beckenbauer started playing football at the age of nine with the youth team of SC Munich '06 in 1954.

Originally a centre-forward, Beckenbauer idolised 1954 FIFA World Cup winner Fritz Walter and supported local side 1860 Munich, then the pre-eminent team in the city, despite their relegation from the top league, the Oberliga Süd, in the 1950s. "It was always my dream to play for them" he would later confirm. That he joined the Bayern Munich youth team in 1959, rather than that of his favourites' 1860 Munich, was the result of a contentious Under-14 youth tournament in nearby Neubiberg. Beckenbauer and his teammates were aware that their SC Munich '06 club lacked the finance to continue running its youth sides, and had determined to join 1860 Munich as a group upon the tournament's conclusion. Fortune decreed that SC Munich and 1860 would meet in the final and a series of niggles during the match eventually resulted in a physical confrontation between Beckenbauer and the opposing centre-half. The ill-feeling this engendered had a strong effect upon Beckenbauer and his teammates, who decided to join Bayern's youth side rather than the team they had recently come to blows with.

In 1963, at the age of 18, Beckenbauer was engulfed by controversy when it was revealed that his girlfriend was pregnant and that he had no intention of marrying her; he was banned from the West Germany national youth team by the DFB and only readmitted after the intervention of the side's coach Dettmar Cramer.

== Club career ==
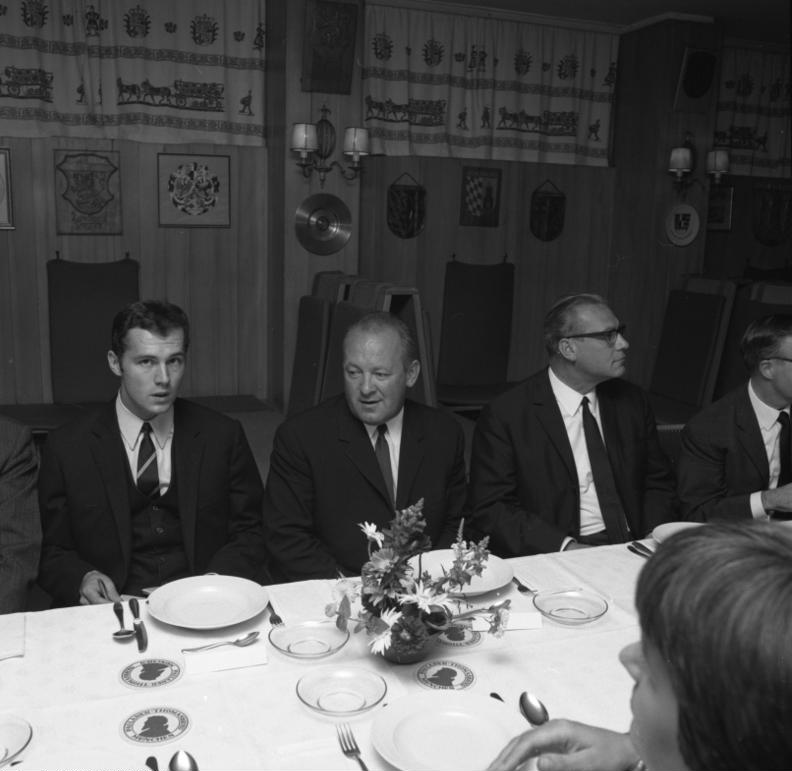
Beckenbauer (left) after Bayern Munich's Cup Winners' Cup triumph in 1967

Beckenbauer made his debut with Bayern in a Bundesliga promotion play-off match on the left wing against FC St. Pauli on 6 June 1964. In his first season in the Regionalliga Süd ("Regional League South", then the second level in Germany), 1964–65, the team won the league and was eventually promoted to the Bundesliga.

Bayern soon became a force in the new German league, winning the German Cup in 1966–67 and achieving European success in the Cup Winners' Cup in 1967. Beckenbauer became team captain for the 1968–69 season and led his club to their first league title. He began experimenting with the sweeper (libero) role around this time, refining the role into a new form and becoming perhaps the greatest exponent of the attacking sweeper game.

During Beckenbauer's tenure at Bayern Munich, the club won three league championships in a row from 1972 to 1974 and also a hat-trick of European Cup wins (1974–76) which earned the club the honour of keeping the trophy permanently.

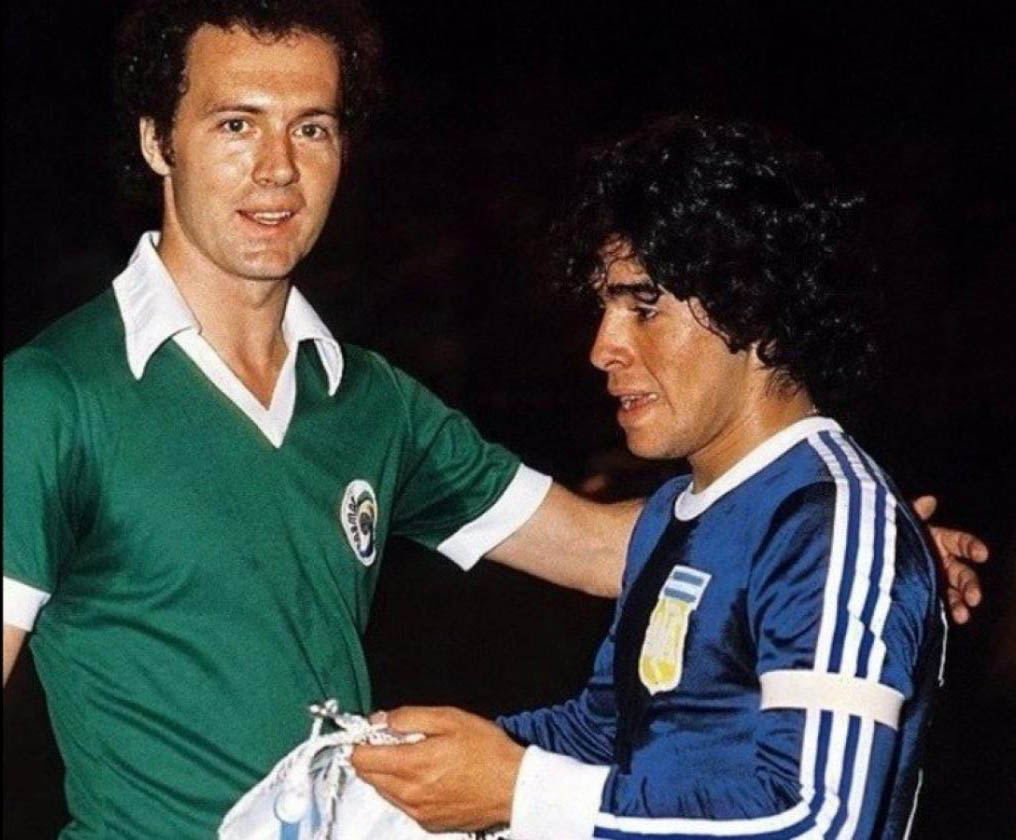
Beckenbauer with Diego Maradona during a New York Cosmos friendly in Argentina, November 1978

Beginning in 1968, Beckenbauer was called "der Kaiser" ('the Emperor') by fans and the media. The following anecdote is told (even during his lifetime by Beckenbauer himself) to explain the origin: On the occasion of a friendly game of Bayern Munich in Vienna, Austria, Beckenbauer posed for a photo session right beside a bust of the former Austrian emperor Franz Joseph I. The media called him Fußball-Kaiser ('football-emperor') afterwards, and soon he was just called der Kaiser. According to a report in the German newspaper Welt am Sonntag, this explanation is untrue, though very popular. According to the report, Beckenbauer fouled his opposite number, Reinhard Libuda from Schalke 04, in the cup final on 14 June 1969. Disregarding the fans' hooting, Beckenbauer took the ball into the opposite part of the field, where he balanced the ball in front of the upset fans for half a minute. Libuda was commonly called König von Westfalen ('king of Westphalia'), so the press looked for an even more exalted moniker and invented der Kaiser.

In 1977, Beckenbauer accepted a lucrative contract to play in the North American Soccer League (NASL) with the New York Cosmos, playing alongside Pelé in his debut season. He played with the Cosmos for four seasons up to 1980, and the team won the Soccer Bowl on three occasions (1977, 1978, 1980).

Beckenbauer retired after a two-year spell with Hamburger SV in Germany (1980–82) with the win of the Bundesliga title that year and one final season with the New York Cosmos in 1983.

== International career ==
Beckenbauer won 103 caps and scored 14 goals for West Germany. He made his debut in a World Cup qualification match against Sweden in Stockholm on 26 September 1965, with West Germany winning 2–1. Beckenbauer scored his first goals for the West Germany national team against the Netherlands on 23 March 1966 at De Kuip, Rotterdam; he scored twice as West Germany won 4–2. He was a member of the World Cup squads that finished runners-up in 1966, third place in 1970, and champions in 1974, while also being named to the tournament all-star team in all three editions. He also won the 1972 European Football Championship and finished as runners-up in the 1976 edition. Beckenbauer became the most capped player for the German national team in 1973, he beat Uwe Seeler's record of 72 matches and was overtaken by Lothar Matthäus in 1993.

=== 1966 World Cup ===
"The message he [Beckenbauer] sent out was: 'Don't even try it. Coming out to face me is a waste of your time.'

— England 1966 World Cup legend Bobby Charlton.

Beckenbauer appeared in his first World Cup in 1966, playing every match. In his first World Cup match, against Switzerland, he scored twice in a 5–0 win. West Germany won their group, and then beat Uruguay 4–0 in quarter-finals, with Beckenbauer scoring the second goal in the 70th minute.

In the semi-finals, the Germans faced the USSR; Helmut Haller opened the scoring, while Beckenbauer netted the second goal of the match, his fourth goal of the tournament, thus contributing to a 2–1 win and helping West Germany advance to the Wembley Stadium final against hosts England.

He and Bobby Charlton were instructed by their respective managers to man-mark each other, thus cancelling out each other's play. England went on to win the final and the Jules Rimet Trophy in extra time. Still, Beckenbauer was nominated the Best Young Player of the tournament, while also being awarded the Bronze Boot, together with Ferenc Bene, Geoff Hurst and Valeriy Porkujan.

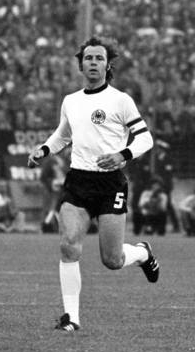
Beckenbauer captaining West Germany against East Germany at the 1974 FIFA World Cup

=== 1970 World Cup ===
West Germany won their first three matches before facing England in the second round in a rematch of the 1966 final. The English were ahead 2–0 in the second half, but a spectacular goal by Beckenbauer in the 69th minute helped the Germans recover and equalise before the end of normal time and win the match in extra time. West Germany advanced to the semi-finals to face Italy, in what would be known as the Game of the Century. He dislocated his shoulder after being fouled, but he was not deterred from continuing in the match, as his side had already used their two permitted substitutions. He stayed on the field carrying his dislocated arm in a sling. The result of this match was 4–3 (after extra time) in favour of the Italians. Germany defeated Uruguay 1–0 for third place.

=== 1972 European championship ===
Beckenbauer became captain of the national side in 1971. In 1972, West Germany won the European Championship, beating the Soviet Union 3–0 in the final.

=== 1974 World Cup ===
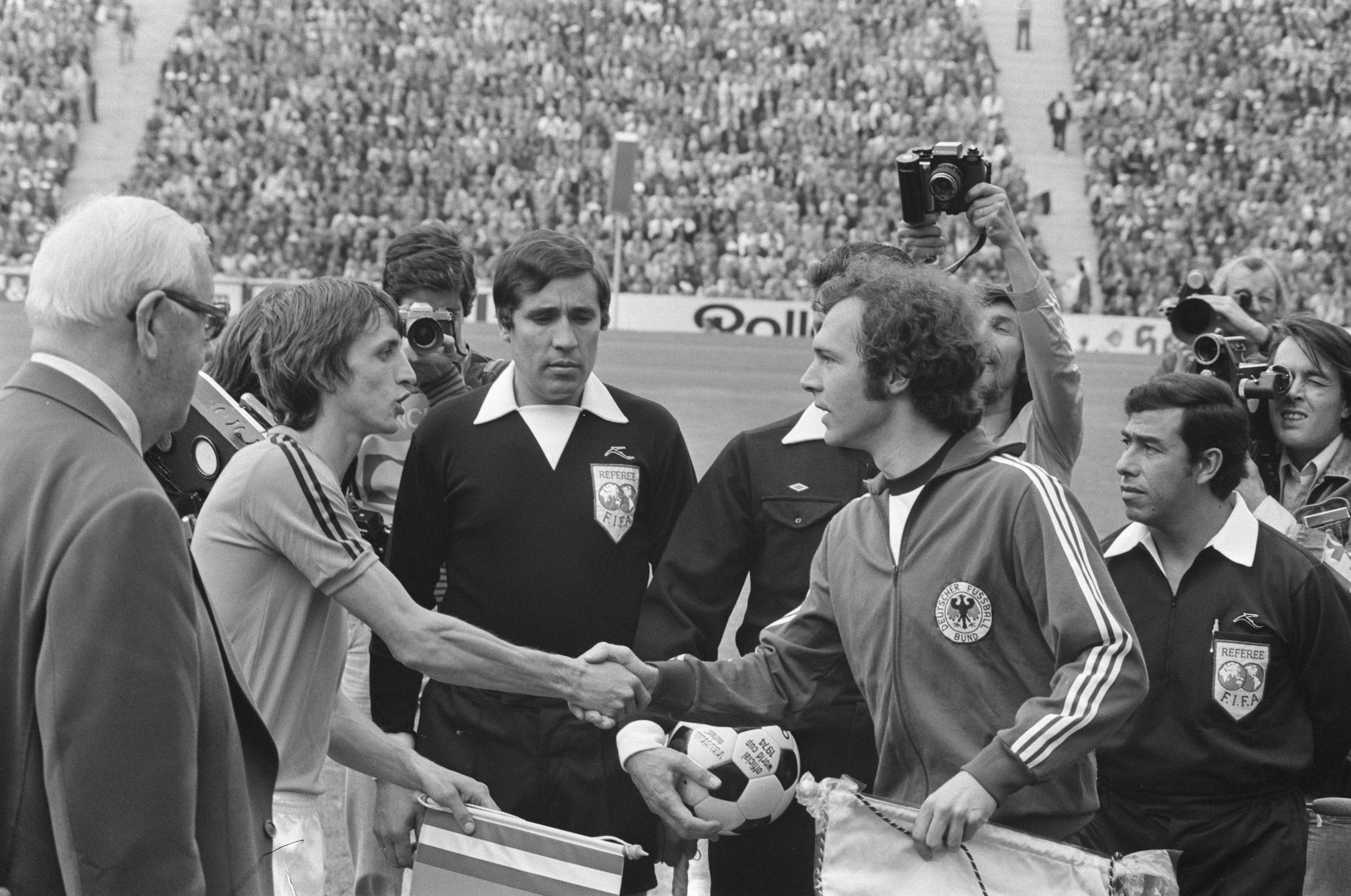
Beckenbauer (right) and Johan Cruyff shake hands and exchange pennants before the 1974 World Cup final

The 1974 World Cup was hosted by West Germany and Beckenbauer led his side to victory, including a hard-fought 2–1 win over the hotly favoured Netherlands side featuring Johan Cruyff. Beckenbauer and his fellow defenders man-marked Cruyff so well that the Dutch were never quite able to put their "Total Football" into full use.

Beckenbauer became the first captain to lift the new FIFA World Cup Trophy after Brazil had retained the Jules Rimet Trophy in 1970. This also gave West Germany the distinction of being the first European national team to win the European Championship and World Cup consecutively (two other countries have done it since: France in 2000, and Spain in 2010 and 2026).

=== 1976 European Championship ===
In the 1976 competition, West Germany again reached the final, where they lost on penalties to Czechoslovakia. Beckenbauer was selected in the Team of the Tournament.

Beckenbauer retired from international football in 1977, at the age of 31, following his move to New York Cosmos.

== Style of play ==
Beckenbauer is widely regarded as one of the greatest football players of all time and is often cited as Germany's greatest player. He is credited with revolutionising the role of a sweeper in football, combining defensive responsibilities with an offensive presence. In addition to his defensive duties, Beckenbauer often started attacks for Bayern Munich and the West Germany national team, utilizing his passing range and technique to act as a playmaker even while being a defender. He also frequently used the one-two passing combination tactic, in which he would pass the ball to a teammate and then to collect the ball later by bypassing opposing players.

Earlier in his career, Beckenbauer played as a midfielder, and was partnered with 1. FC Köln playmaker Wolfgang Overath in a two-man midfield for the West Germany national team in the 1966 and 1970 World Cups.

Throughout his career, Beckenbauer stood out for his leadership and fair play, having never received a red card during his time at Bayern.

== Managerial career ==
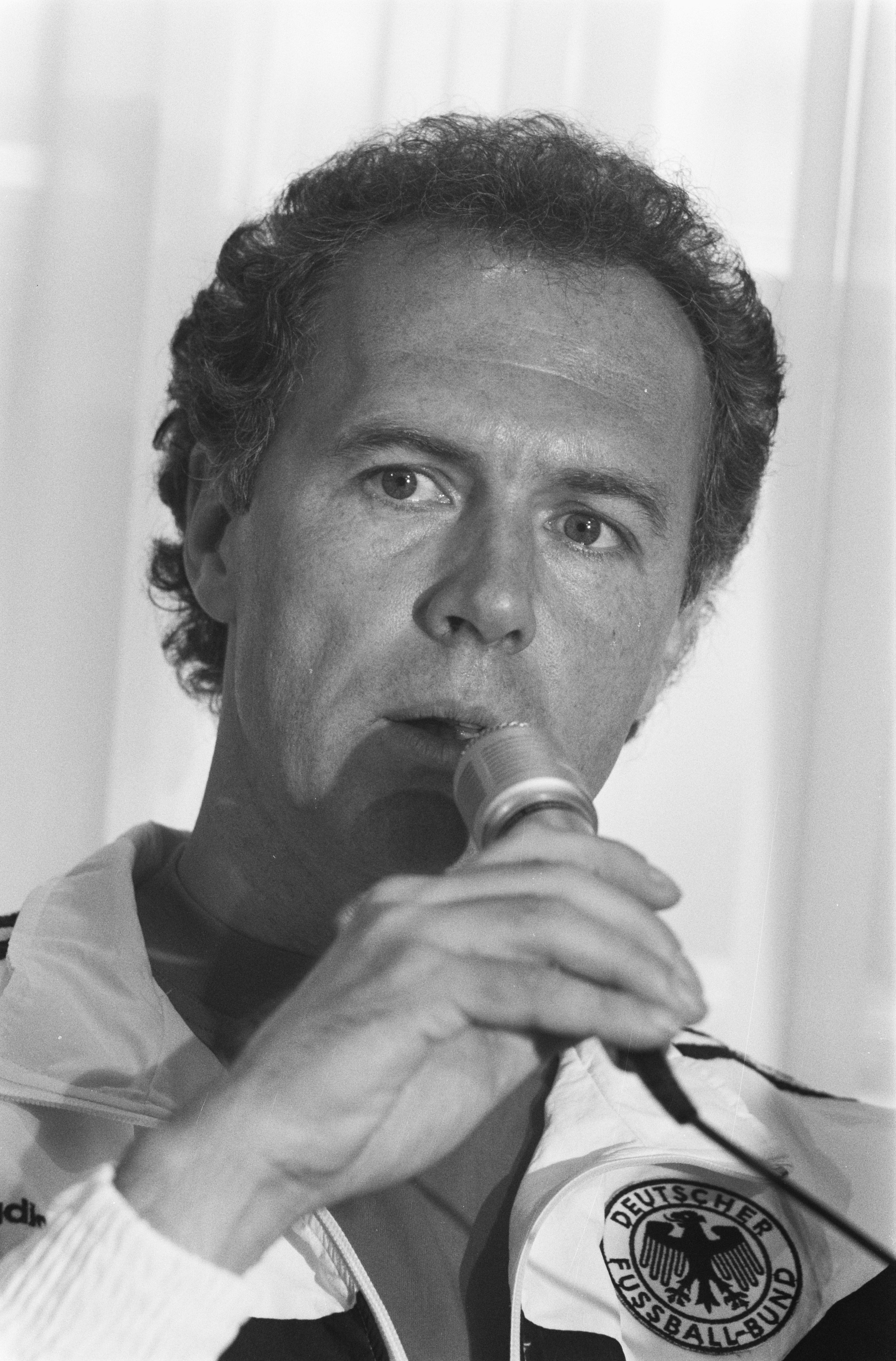
Beckenbauer as manager of West Germany in 1989

On his return to Germany, Beckenbauer was appointed manager of the West Germany national team to replace Jupp Derwall on 12 September 1984. He took the team all the way to the final of the 1986 World Cup, where they lost to the Diego Maradona inspired Argentina.

In 1990, before the German reunification, Beckenbauer managed the last Germany national football team without East German players in a World Cup, winning the final 1–0, against Argentina, in a rematch of the previous World Cup final. Beckenbauer was one of three men (with Mario Zagallo, and Didier Deschamps) to have won the Cup as a player and as a manager, and he is the first man and one of only two (with Didier Deschamps) to have won the title as team captain as well as a manager.

Beckenbauer then moved into club management and accepted a job with Marseille in 1990, but left the club midway through his first season. Marseille won the 1990–91 French championship and ended runner-up of the 1990–91 European Cup under the management of his successor, Raymond Goethals.

From 28 December 1993 until 30 June 1994, and then from 29 April 1996 until 30 June of the same year, Beckenbauer managed Bayern Munich. His brief spells in charge saw him collect two further honours – the Bundesliga title in 1994 and the UEFA Cup in 1996.

In 1994, Beckenbauer took on the role of club president at Bayern, and much of the success in the following years has been credited to his astute management. Following the club's decision to change from an association to a limited company, he was chairman of the advisory as of since the beginning of 2002. He stepped down as president of Bayern in 2009, being succeeded by long-time general manager Uli Hoeneß.

In 1998, Beckenbauer became vice-president of the German Football Association. At the end of the 1990s, Beckenbauer headed the successful bid by Germany to organize the 2006 FIFA World Cup. He chaired the organizational committee for the World Cup and was a commentator for the Bild-Zeitung.

== Financial controversies ==
=== FIFA inquiries and ban ===
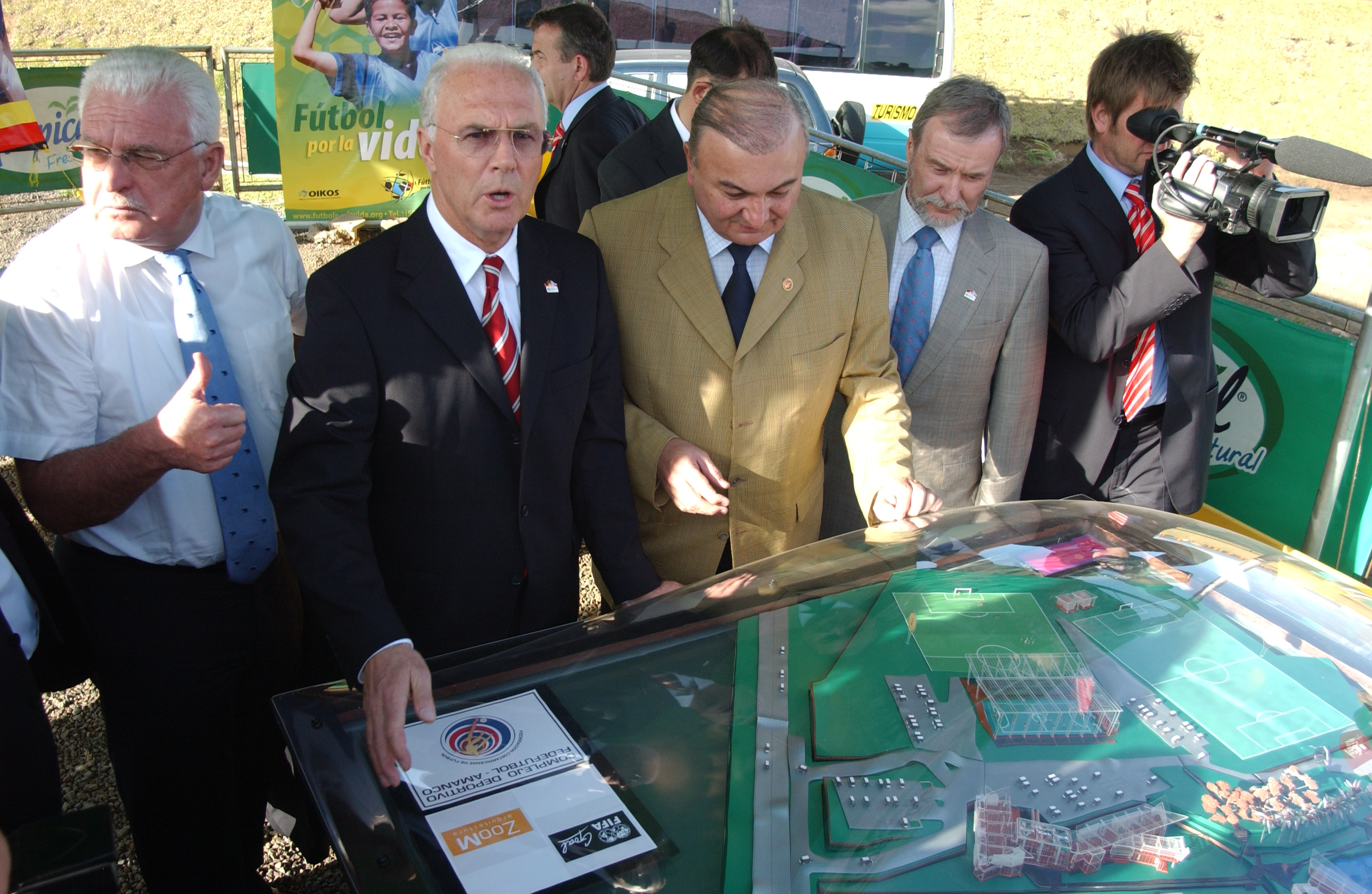
Beckenbauer (second from left) in 2007

In June 2014, Beckenbauer was banned by FIFA Ethics Committee for 90 days from any football-related activity for allegedly refusing to cooperate with an inquiry into corruption dealing with the allocation of the 2018 and 2022 World Cups to Russia and Qatar. He protested the ban, as he had requested the questions that were put to him be in German and in writing. The ban was lifted after Beckenbauer agreed to participate in FIFA's inquiry. In February 2016, Beckenbauer was fined CHF 7,000 and warned by FIFA Ethics Committee for failing to cooperate with the inquiry in 2014.

In March 2016, the Ethics Committee opened formal proceedings against Beckenbauer regarding the awarding of the 2006 FIFA World Cup to Germany.

In the course of investigations, Swiss officials also found evidence of a payment of at least 1.7 million euro, allegedly from the South African Football Association, to Beckenbauer, via Gibraltar. It was claimed this was a consultancy fee for helping secure the hosting of the 2010 World Cup for South Africa.

It also emerged that Beckenbauer, who had claimed to be working for free for the World Cup Organizing Committee of the German Football Association (DFB), had been paid 5.5 million from the income of a sponsorship deal that the German Football Association had made with betting company Oddset in 2004. No tax had been paid in Germany on the money until the authorities chanced upon it in 2010. Beckenbauer stated he had already paid the tax due on his share in Austria, where he was tax resident.

In 2021, FIFA closed its ethics inquiry against Beckenbauer, as the statute of limitations had expired.

=== Alleged bribe from Russia ===
In October 2019, Black Mirror Leaks published email correspondence of Russian member of Parliament, Sergey Kapkov, where Beckenbauer and his adviser, Fedor Radmann, were named as recipients of €3 million for their votes in favour of Russia as host of the 2018 World Cup. Both allegedly received an additional €1.5 million in success fees after the 2018 cup was allocated to Russia.

=== Tax issues ===
In 1976, Beckenbauer paid 1.6 million D-Marks in back taxes. He had relied on advice to shelter income from tax using a financial structure which was later found to be invalid. In this instance, he was not fined. He claimed in his memoir that the Bavarian Finance Minister Ludwig Huber, who had attended Beckenbauer's 30th birthday party in 1975, had given him tax advice, including about moving to Switzerland. Huber was also president of the state-owned bank and approved a loan of 1 million D-Marks to enable him to pay the back-taxes.

In 1982, Beckenbauer moved to Austria, where tax rates were lower. In 1987, Beckenbauer was fined by Swiss authorities for evading taxes while living in Switzerland between 1977 and 1980.

== Media ==
During his playing career, Beckenbauer's popularity was such that he was included as a character in Monty Python's sketch "The Philosophers' Football Match" as the sole genuine player and a "surprise inclusion" to the German team. During the match, between famous Greek and German philosophers, instead of actually playing football, the "players" walk in circles contemplating philosophy, while "asking questions", a popular phrase used by English football commentators, much to the confusion of Beckenbauer.

In a 2013 advertisement for South Korean company Samsung, Beckenbauer appeared as the manager of a Galaxy XI of football players from around the globe, and hands the captain's armband to Lionel Messi. Beckenbauer features in EA Sports' FIFA video game series; he was included in the FIFA 15 Ultimate Team Legends.

== Personal life ==
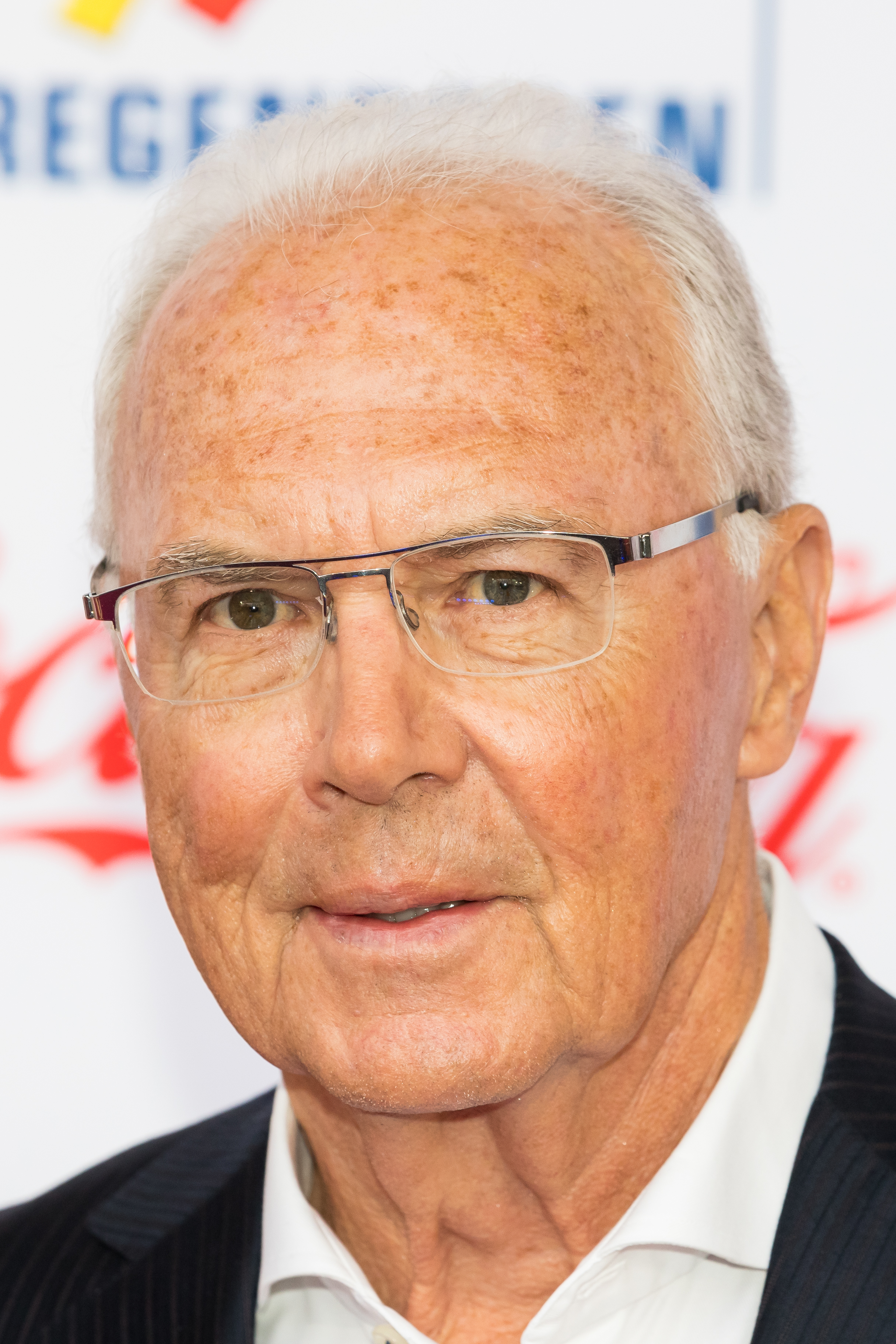
Beckenbauer in 2019

Beckenbauer was married three times and had five children, one of whom, Stephan, was a professional footballer, who died from a brain tumour on 31 July 2015, at the age of 46. Stephan's son Luca is also a professional footballer, playing for SV Wacker Burghausen in the Regionalliga Bayern.

A practising Catholic, Beckenbauer believed that one's soul travels after death.

After appearing in an advertisement for a mobile phone company, Beckenbauer specifically requested the number 0176 / 666666 for his mobile phone. He was soon called by several men who thought it was a phone sex number (in German, "6" translates to "sechs", sounding similar to "sex").

Beckenbauer became an honorary consul of Kosovo in 2011, to help promote Kosovo's campaign for membership of UEFA and FIFA.

In 2016 and 2017, Beckenbauer had cardiac surgery, and received an artificial hip in 2018.

=== Charity work ===
At the end of his career as a Bundesliga player, Beckenbauer established the foundation Franz-Beckenbauer-Stiftung in Hamburg on 15 May 1982 to support the disabled, the sick and people in need. He gave the foundation the gate money of 800,000 DM from his farewell match on 1 June 1982 (Hamburger SV versus Germany national team, which the national team won 4–2), and later added another 200,000 DM. In total, Beckenbauer raised more than 20 million euros for the foundation. His wife, Heidrun, is chairman of the foundation.

== Death ==
Beckenbauer died on 7 January 2024, at the age of 78, due to natural causes as announced by his family in a note sent to Deutsche Presse-Agentur. A memorial service was held at Allianz Arena on 19 January.

== Legacy ==
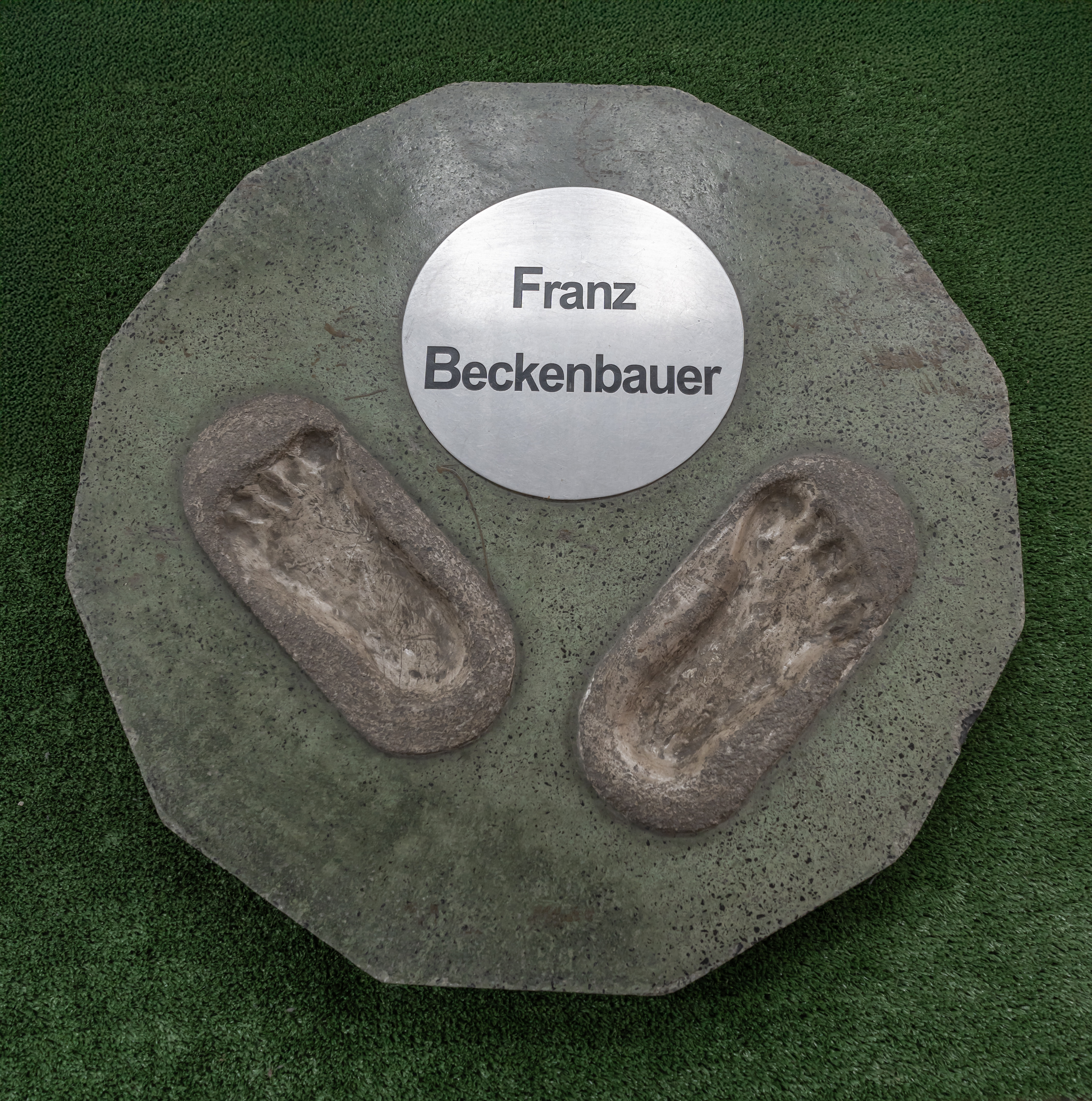
Beckenbauer's footprints on the Walk of Fame at Maracanã Stadium in Brazil

"Franz Beckenbauer symbolises football and a winning mentality. On top of that, he brought the World Cup to his own country. We're proud of him."

— German tennis player Boris Becker.

"He's the hero of our nation. It hasn't happened by chance, he's earned it by hard work."

— West Germany team-mate Günter Netzer.

Beckenbauer is widely considered to be one of the greatest footballers in the history of the game. He is the only defender in football history to win the Ballon d'Or twice, and is often credited as having invented the role of the modern sweeper or libero, a defensive player who intervenes proactively in the offensive game of his team. Named European Footballer of the Year twice, Beckenbauer was chosen on the World Team of the 20th Century in 1998, and the FIFA World Cup Dream Team in 2002.

An icon in Germany, and one of only three men (Mário Zagallo and Didier Deschamps being the others) to have won the World Cup both as a player and manager, Beckenbauer was praised by former German chancellor Gerhard Schröder for winning the World Cup as a player in 1974, winning as manager in 1990, and for playing a leading role in Germany's success of achieving host status of the 2006 World Cup. His reputation as an administrator was later tarnished by repeated allegations of bribery.

When Beckenbauer praised Liverpool manager Jürgen Klopp in 2019, Klopp said he felt that he had been given knighthood by a king. After his death in 2024, La Gazzetta dello Sport declared Beckenbauer to be the "greatest defender ever", and was praised by many outlets to be one of the greatest players of all time. On 19 September 2024, it was announced that Allianz Arena's address was changed to "Franz Beckenbauer Platz 5" on 1 May 2025.

== Career statistics ==
=== Club ===
Appearances and goals by club, season and competition
| Club | Season | League | | | DFB-Pokal | | Europe | | Other | | Total | |
| Club | Season | Division | Apps | Goals | Apps | Goals | Apps | Goals | Apps | Goals | Apps | Goals |
|---|---|---|---|---|---|---|---|---|---|---|---|---|
| Bayern Munich | 1963–64 | Regionalliga Süd | 0 | 0 | — | | — | | 6 (Note: Appearances in Bundesliga promotion play-offs) | 2 | 6 | 2 |
| Bayern Munich | 1964–65 | Regionalliga Süd | 31 | 16 | — | | — | | 8 (Note: Six appearances and one goal in Bundesliga promotion play-offs, two appearances and one goal in Southern German Cup) | 2 | 39 | 18 |
| Bayern Munich | 1965–66 | Bundesliga | 33 | 4 | 6 | 1 | — | | — | | 39 | 5 |
| Bayern Munich | 1966–67 | Bundesliga | 33 | 0 | 5 | 0 | 9 (Note: Appearances in European Cup Winners' Cup) | 0 | — | | 47 | 0 |
| Bayern Munich | 1967–68 | Bundesliga | 28 | 4 | 4 | 0 | 7 | 1 | — | | 39 | 5 |
| Bayern Munich | 1968–69 | Bundesliga | 33 | 2 | 6 | 0 | — | | — | | 39 | 2 |
| Bayern Munich | 1969–70 | Bundesliga | 34 | 6 | 1 | 0 | 2 (Note: Appearances in European Cup) | 0 | — | | 37 | 6 |
| Bayern Munich | 1970–71 | Bundesliga | 33 | 3 | 9 | 1 | 8 (Note: Appearances in Inter-Cities Fairs Cup) | 1 | — | | 50 | 5 |
| Bayern Munich | 1971–72 | Bundesliga | 34 | 6 | 6 | 1 | 7 | 0 | — | | 47 | 7 |
| Bayern Munich | 1972–73 | Bundesliga | 34 | 6 | 6 | 0 | 6 | 1 | 5 (Note: Appearances in DFB-Ligapokal) | 0 | 51 | 7 |
| Bayern Munich | 1973–74 | Bundesliga | 34 | 4 | 4 | 0 | 10 | 1 | — | | 48 | 5 |
| Bayern Munich | 1974–75 | Bundesliga | 33 | 1 | 3 | 0 | 7 | 1 | — | | 43 | 2 |
| Bayern Munich | 1975–76 | Bundesliga | 34 | 5 | 7 | 2 | 9 | 0 | 2 (Note: Appearances in UEFA Super Cup) | 0 | 52 | 7 |
| Bayern Munich | 1976–77 | Bundesliga | 33 | 3 | 4 | 0 | 6 | 1 | 4 (Note: Two appearances in UEFA Super Cup, two appearances in Intercontinental Cup) | 0 | 47 | 4 |
| Bayern Munich | Total | | 427 | 60 | 61 | 5 | 71 | 6 | 25 | 4 | 584 | 75 |
| New York Cosmos | 1977 | NASL | 15 | 4 | — | | — | | 6 (Note: Appearances in NASL play-offs) | 1 | 21 | 5 |
| New York Cosmos | 1978 | NASL | 27 | 8 | — | | — | | 6 | 2 | 33 | 10 |
| New York Cosmos | 1979 | NASL | 12 | 1 | — | | — | | 6 | 0 | 18 | 1 |
| New York Cosmos | 1980 | NASL | 26 | 4 | — | | — | | 7 | 1 | 33 | 5 |
| New York Cosmos | Total | | 80 | 17 | — | | — | | 25 | 4 | 105 | 21 |
| Hamburger SV | 1980–81 | Bundesliga | 18 | 0 | 2 | 0 | 0 | 0 | — | | 20 | 0 |
| Hamburger SV | 1981–82 | Bundesliga | 10 | 0 | 3 | 0 | 5 (Note: Appearances in UEFA Cup) | 0 | — | | 18 | 0 |
| Hamburger SV | Total | | 28 | 0 | 5 | 0 | 5 | 0 | — | | 38 | 0 |
| New York Cosmos | 1983 | NASL | 25 | 2 | — | | — | | 2 | 0 | 27 | 2 |
| Career total | | | 560 | 79 | 66 | 5 | 76 | 6 | 52 | 8 | 754 | 98 |

=== International ===
Appearances and goals by national team and year
| National team | Year | Apps | Goals |
|---|---|---|---|
| West Germany | 1965 | 3 | 0 |
| West Germany | 1966 | 12 | 7 |
| West Germany | 1967 | 5 | 0 |
| West Germany | 1968 | 9 | 1 |
| West Germany | 1969 | 6 | 0 |
| West Germany | 1970 | 12 | 2 |
| West Germany | 1971 | 9 | 2 |
| West Germany | 1972 | 7 | 0 |
| West Germany | 1973 | 10 | 1 |
| West Germany | 1974 | 15 | 0 |
| West Germany | 1975 | 7 | 0 |
| West Germany | 1976 | 7 | 1 |
| West Germany | 1977 | 1 | 0 |
| Total | | 103 | 14 |

Scores and results list Germany's goal tally first, score column indicates score after each Beckenbauer goal.

List of international goals scored by Franz Beckenbauer
| No. | Date | Venue | Opponent | Score | Result | Competition |
|---|---|---|---|---|---|---|
| 1 | 23 March 1966 | Rotterdam, Netherlands | Netherlands | 3–1 | 4–2 | Friendly |
| 2 | 23 March 1966 | Rotterdam, Netherlands | Netherlands | 4–2 | 4–2 | Friendly |
| 3 | 4 May 1966 | Dublin, Republic of Ireland | Republic of Ireland | 2–0 | 4–0 | Friendly |
| 4 | 12 July 1966 | Sheffield, England | Switzerland | 3–0 | 5–0 | FIFA World Cup 1966 |
| 5 | 12 July 1966 | Sheffield, England | Switzerland | 4–0 | 5–0 | FIFA World Cup 1966 |
| 6 | 23 July 1966 | Sheffield, England | Uruguay | 2–0 | 4–0 | FIFA World Cup 1966 |
| 7 | 25 July 1966 | Liverpool, England | Soviet Union | 2–0 | 2–1 | FIFA World Cup 1966 |
| 8 | 1 June 1968 | Hanover, West Germany | England | 1–0 | 1–0 | Friendly |
| 9 | 14 June 1970 | León, Mexico | England | 1–2 | 3–2 (a.e.t.) | FIFA World Cup 1970 |
| 10 | 22 November 1970 | Athens, Greece | Greece | 3–1 | 3–1 | Friendly |
| 11 | 22 June 1971 | Oslo, Norway | Norway | 3–0 | 7–1 | Friendly |
| 12 | 30 June 1971 | Copenhagen, Denmark | Denmark | 3–1 | 3–1 | Friendly |
| 13 | 12 May 1973 | Hamburg, West Germany | Bulgaria | 1–0 | 3–0 | Friendly |
| 14 | 6 October 1976 | Cardiff, Wales | Wales | 1–0 | 2–0 | Friendly |

=== Managerial record ===
As of 22 January 2014

| Team | From | To | Record | | | | | |
| Team | From | To | G | W | D | L | Win % | Ref. |
|---|---|---|---|---|---|---|---|---|
| West Germany | 1984 | 1990 | 66 | 34 | 20 | 12 | 51.52 | |
| Olympique Marseille | 1 September 1990 | 31 December 1990 | 25 | 16 | 4 | 5 | 64.00 | |
| Bayern Munich | 28 December 1993 | 30 June 1994 | 14 | 9 | 2 | 3 | 64.29 | |
| Bayern Munich | 28 April 1996 | 30 June 1996 | 5 | 3 | 0 | 2 | 60.00 | |
| Total | | | 110 | 62 | 26 | 22 | 56.36 | — |

== Honours ==
=== Player ===
Bayern Munich

- Regionalliga Süd: 1964–65
- Bundesliga: 1968–69, 1971–72, 1972–73, 1973–74
- DFB-Pokal: 1965–66, 1966–67, 1968–69, 1970–71
- European Cup: 1973–74, 1974–75, 1975–76
- European Cup Winners' Cup: 1966–67
- Intercontinental Cup: 1976

New York Cosmos

- North American Soccer League: 1977, 1978, 1980

Hamburger SV

- Bundesliga: 1981–82

West Germany

- FIFA World Cup: 1974; runner-up: 1966; third place: 1970
- UEFA European Championship: 1972; runner-up: 1976

=== Manager ===
West Germany

- FIFA World Cup: 1990; runner-up: 1986
- UEFA European Championship Third place: 1988

Marseille

- Ligue 1: 1990–91

Bayern Munich

- Bundesliga: 1993–94
- UEFA Cup: 1995–96

=== Individual ===
Player

- Ballon d'Or: 1972, 1976; runner-up: 1974, 1975; third place: 1966
- Footballer of the Year (Germany): 1966, 1968, 1974, 1976
- kicker Bundesliga Team of the Season: 1965–66, 1966–67, 1967–68, 1968–69, 1969–70, 1970–71, 1971–72, 1972–73, 1973–74, 1974–75, 1975–76, 1976–77
- FIFA World Cup Best Young Player Award: 1966
- FIFA World Cup Bronze Boot: 1966
- FUWO European Team of the Season: 1966, 1967, 1968, 1969, 1970, 1972
- FIFA XI: 1968
- Sport Ideal European XI: 1971, 1972, 1973, 1974, 1975, 1976
- NASL Most Valuable Player Award: 1977
- FIFA Order of Merit: 1984
- UEFA Euro Team of the Tournament: 1972, 1976
- World Team of the 20th Century: 1998
- FIFA World Cup Dream Team: 2002
- FIFA Centennial Player and Football Personality Award: 2004
- FIFA 100: 2004
- Laureus Lifetime Achievement Award: 2007
- IFFHS Universal Genius of World Football: 2007
- Golden Foot: 2010, as football legend
- Marca Leyenda: 2012
- FIFA Presidential Award: 2012
- UEFA President's Award: 2012
- World Soccer Greatest XI of All Time: 2013
- UEFA Euro All-time XI: 2016
- UEFA Golden Jubilee Poll second place: 2004
- France Football's Football Player of the Century sixth place: 1999
- World Soccer Greatest Players of 20th century fourth place: 1999
- Eric Batty's World XI: 1966, 1967, 1968, 1969, 1971, 1972, 1973, 1974, 1975, 1976, 1977
- IFFHS All-time Men's World Dream Team: 2021
- IFFHS All-time Men's European Dream Team: 2021
- IFFHS Men Team of the Century (1901–2000): 2021

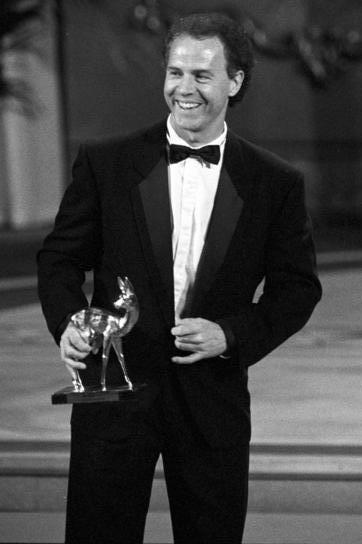
Beckenbauer receiving the Sports Bambi Award at the Leipzig Opera, Augustusplatz in 1990

- IFFHS World Player of the Century third place: 2000
- European Player (1956–1989): 1990
- IFFHS European Player of the Century second place: 2000
- IFFHS Legends: 2016
- Bayern Munich All-time XI: 2005
- Germany's Sports Hall of Fame: 2008
- Number 5 shirt retired by Bayern Munich: 2024
- Ballon d'Or Dream Team: 2020
- Central defender in Johan Cruyff's favourite World XI

Manager

- World Soccer Awards Manager of the Year: 1990
- World Soccer 29th Greatest Manager of All Time: 2013

Sportsperson

- Placar (2013): "Biggest genius" in the history of football

== See also ==
- List of men's footballers with 100 or more international caps
- List of FIFA World Cup top goalscorers
- List of UEFA Cup winning managers

== Bibliography ==
- Hesse-Lichtenberger, Ulrich (2002). Tor! The Story of German Football. London: WSC Books. ISBN 0-9540134-3-3.

== Literature ==
- Beckenbauer, Franz and Dettmar Cramer, Nicht nur ein Spiel! Reinbek: Rowohlt, 2006, ISBN 3-498-00640-1.
- Körner, Torsten, Franz Beckenbauer – der freie Mann. Scherz, Frankfurt 2005, ISBN 3-502-18391-0.
- Kratzert, Armin: Beckenbauer taucht nicht auf. Roman. Kirchheim Verlag, München 2012, ISBN 978-3-87410-119-6
- Kummermehr, Petra (Hrsg.): Das Buch Franz. Botschaften eines Kaisers. Diederichs, München 2011, ISBN 978-3-424-35063-0.
- Suling, Nils (4 November 2023). Wir Helden von Rom. Die wahre Geschichte der WM 1990 – erzählt von den Weltmeistern (in German). Edel Sports - ein Verlag der Edel Verlagsgruppe. ISBN 978-3-98588-080-5.
