= FIFA 100 =

2004 list of greatest living footballers chosen by Pelé

The FIFA 100 is a list compiled by Brazilian professional footballer Pelé featuring his choices of the "greatest living footballers" at the time of its release. The list was unveiled on 4 March 2004 during a gala ceremony at the Natural History Museum in London, England, as part of the celebrations commemorating the 100th anniversary of the foundation of the Fédération Internationale de Football Association (FIFA), the international governing body of football.

The figure 100 does not refer number of players nominated in the list, which is actually 125. Pelé was asked by FIFA to select 50 active players and 50 retired players from a shortlist of 300, but found it too difficult to limit himself and therefore picked 50 current and 75 former players. The list contains 123 men and two women (Michelle Akers and Mia Hamm).

The list was controversial. Writing in the Evening Standard, politician turned football pundit, David Mellor, felt the selections were politically motivated rather than being made on purely footballing grounds. He suggested the geographical spread of inclusions indicated the list came from then-FIFA president Sepp Blatter rather than Pelé himself. BBC columnist Tim Vickery expressed similar assertions.

Brazilian midfielder Gérson, who played alongside Pelé at the 1966 and 1970 FIFA World Cups, reacted to his omission by tearing up a copy of the list on a Brazilian television programme. Marco van Basten and Uwe Seeler refused to take part in the project on a point of principle.

== Players ==
Players appearing in the FIFA 100 list
Image	Player	Nationality	Position	Status (in 2004)
Gabriel Batistuta pictured in 2006	Gabriel Batistuta	Argentina	Forward	Active
Hernán Crespo pictured in 2007	Hernán Crespo	Argentina	Forward	Active
Alfredo Di Stéfano pictured in 1959	Alfredo Di Stéfano	Argentina (Note: Born in Argentina, Di Stéfano played for Spain, Argentina, and Colombia, though the latter was not recognised by FIFA at the time.)	Forward	Retired
Mario Kempes pictured in 1982	Mario Kempes	Argentina	Forward	Retired
Diego Maradona pictured in 1986	Diego Maradona	Argentina	Midfielder	Retired
Daniel Passarella pictured in 1979	Daniel Passarella	Argentina	Defender	Retired
Javier Saviola pictured in 2007	Javier Saviola	Argentina	Forward	Active
Omar Sívori pictured in 1954	Omar Sívori	Argentina (Note: Born in Argentina, Sívori played for both Italy and Argentina.)	Forward	Retired
Juan Sebastián Verón pictured in 1995	Juan Sebastián Verón	Argentina	Midfielder	Active
Javier Zanetti pictured in 2009	Javier Zanetti	Argentina	Defender/Midfielder	Active
Jan Ceulemans pictured in 1980	Jan Ceulemans	Belgium	Midfielder	Retired
Jean-Marie Pfaff pictured in 1980	Jean-Marie Pfaff	Belgium	Goalkeeper	Retired
Franky Van der Elst pictured in 2010	Franky Van der Elst	Belgium	Midfielder	Retired
Carlos Alberto Torres pictured in 1978	Carlos Alberto	Brazil	Defender	Retired
Cafu pictured in 2007	Cafu	Brazil	Defender	Active
Paulo Roberto Falcão pictured in the 1983-84 season	Falcão	Brazil	Midfielder	Retired
Léo Júnior pictured in 1983	Júnior	Brazil	Midfielder	Retired
Pelé pictured in 1970	Pelé	Brazil	Forward	Retired
Rivaldo pictured in 2010	Rivaldo	Brazil	Midfielder/Forward	Active
Rivellino pictured in 1970	Rivellino	Brazil	Midfielder	Retired
Roberto Carlos pictured in 2011	Roberto Carlos	Brazil	Defender	Active
Romário pictured in 1989	Romário	Brazil	Forward	Active
Ronaldinho pictured in 2010	Ronaldinho	Brazil	Midfielder/Forward	Active
Ronaldo pictured in 2002	Ronaldo	Brazil	Forward	Active
Djalma Santos pictured in 1970	Djalma Santos	Brazil	Defender	Retired
Nílton Santos pictured in 1956	Nílton Santos	Brazil	Defender	Retired
Sócrates pictured in 2005	Sócrates	Brazil	Midfielder	Retired
Zico pictured in 2012	Zico	Brazil	Midfielder/Forward	Retired
Hristo Stoichov pictured in 2016	Hristo Stoichkov	Bulgaria	Forward	Retired
Roger Milla pictured in 2008	Roger Milla	Cameroon	Forward	Retired
Elías Figueroa pictured in 1974	Elías Figueroa	Chile	Defender	Retired
Iván Zamorano pictured in 2008	Iván Zamorano	Chile	Forward	Retired
Carlos Valderrama pictured in 2010	Carlos Valderrama	Colombia	Midfielder	Retired
Davor Šuker pictured in 2014	Davor Šuker	Croatia (Note: Born in the Socialist Republic of Croatia, then part of the Socialist Federal Republic of Yugoslavia, Šuker played for both Yugoslavia and Croatia.)	Forward	Retired
Masopust pictured in 1962	Josef Masopust	Czech Republic (Note: Masopust played for Czechoslovakia.)	Midfielder	Retired
Pavel Nedvěd pictured in 2006	Pavel Nedvěd	Czech Republic	Midfielder	Active
Brian Laudrup pictured in 2013	Brian Laudrup	Denmark	Forward/Midfielder	Retired
Michael Laudrup pictured in 2016	Michael Laudrup	Denmark	Midfielder	Retired
Peter Schmeichel pictured in 2012	Peter Schmeichel	Denmark	Goalkeeper	Retired
Gordon Banks pictured in 1970	Gordon Banks	England	Goalkeeper	Retired
David Beckham pictured in 2010	David Beckham	England	Midfielder	Active
Bobby Charlton pictured in 2012	Bobby Charlton	England	Midfielder/Forward	Retired
Kevin Keegan pictured c. 1980	Kevin Keegan	England	Forward	Retired
Gary Lineker pictured in 2010	Gary Lineker	England	Forward	Retired
Michael Owen pictured in 2014	Michael Owen	England	Forward	Active
Alan Shearer pictured in 2008	Alan Shearer	England	Forward	Active
Eric Cantona pictured in 2009	Eric Cantona	France	Forward	Retired
	Marcel Desailly	France	Defender	Active
Deschamps in August 2000	Didier Deschamps	France	Midfielder	Retired
Fontaine in 1966	Just Fontaine	France	Forward	Retired
Henry in 2007	Thierry Henry	France	Forward	Active
	Raymond Kopa	France	Forward	Retired
	Jean-Pierre Papin	France	Forward	Retired
	Robert Pires	France	Midfielder	Active
	Michel Platini	France (Note: Born in France, Platini played for both Kuwait and France)	Forward	Retired
	Lilian Thuram	France	Defender	Active
	Marius Trésor	France	Defender	Retired
	David Trezeguet	France	Forward	Active
	Patrick Vieira	France	Midfielder	Active
	Zinedine Zidane	France	Midfielder	Active
	Michael Ballack	Germany	Midfielder	Active
	Franz Beckenbauer	Germany (Note: Played for the West Germany national team)	Defender	Retired
	Paul Breitner	Germany	Midfielder/Defender	Retired
	Oliver Kahn	Germany	Goalkeeper	Active
	Jürgen Klinsmann	Germany (Note: Played for both the West Germany and Germany national teams)	Forward	Retired
	Sepp Maier	Germany	Goalkeeper	Retired
	Lothar Matthäus	Germany	Midfielder/Defender	Retired
	Gerd Müller	Germany	Forward	Retired
	Karl-Heinz Rummenigge	Germany	Forward	Retired
	Uwe Seeler	Germany	Forward	Retired
	Abedi Pele	Ghana	Forward	Retired
	Ferenc Puskás	Hungary (Note: Born in Hungary, Puskás played for Spain and Hungary)	Forward	Retired
	Roberto Baggio	Italy	Forward/Midfielder	Active
	Franco Baresi	Italy	Defender	Retired
	Giuseppe Bergomi	Italy	Defender	Retired
	Giampiero Boniperti	Italy	Forward	Retired
	Gianluigi Buffon	Italy	Goalkeeper	Active
	Alessandro Del Piero	Italy	Forward	Active
	Giacinto Facchetti	Italy	Defender	Retired
	Paolo Maldini	Italy	Defender	Active
	Alessandro Nesta	Italy	Defender	Active
	Gianni Rivera	Italy	Defender	Retired
	Paolo Rossi	Italy	Forward	Retired
	Francesco Totti	Italy	Forward/Midfielder	Active
	Christian Vieri	Italy	Forward	Active
	Dino Zoff	Italy	Goalkeeper	Retired
Hidetoshi Nakata pictured in 2012	Hidetoshi Nakata	Japan	Midfielder	Active
George Weah pictured in 2019	George Weah	Liberia	Forward	Retired
Hugo Sanchez pictured in 1988	Hugo Sánchez	Mexico	Forward	Retired
	Marco van Basten	Netherlands	Forward	Retired
	Dennis Bergkamp	Netherlands	Forward	Active
	Johan Cruyff	Netherlands	Forward	Retired
	Edgar Davids	Netherlands	Midfielder	Active
	Ruud Gullit	Netherlands	Midfielder	Retired
	René van de Kerkhof	Netherlands	Midfielder	Retired
	Willy van de Kerkhof	Netherlands	Midfielder	Retired
	Patrick Kluivert	Netherlands	Forward	Active
	Johan Neeskens	Netherlands	Midfielder	Retired
	Ruud van Nistelrooy	Netherlands	Forward	Active
	Rob Rensenbrink	Netherlands	Forward	Retired
	Frank Rijkaard	Netherlands	Midfielder/Defender	Retired
	Clarence Seedorf	Netherlands	Midfielder	Active
Jay-Jay Okocha pictured in 2017	Jay-Jay Okocha	Nigeria	Midfielder	Active
George Best pictured in 1976	George Best	Northern Ireland	Midfielder	Retired
	Romerito	Paraguay	Forward	Retired
	Teófilo Cubillas	Peru	Forward	Retired
	Zbigniew Boniek	Poland	Midfielder	Retired
	Eusébio	Portugal	Forward	Retired
	Luís Figo	Portugal	Midfielder	Active
	Rui Costa	Portugal	Midfielder	Active
Roy Keane pictured in 2014	Roy Keane	Republic of Ireland	Midfielder	Active
Gheorghe Hagi pictured in 2014	Gheorghe Hagi	Romania	Midfielder	Retired
Rinat Dasayev pictured in 2008	Rinat Dasayev	Russia (Note: Dasayev played for the Soviet Union.)	Goalkeeper	Retired
Kenny Dalglish pictured in 1983 or 1984	Kenny Dalglish	Scotland	Forward	Retired
El Hadji Diouf pictured in 2011	El Hadji Diouf	Senegal	Forward	Active
Hong Myung-bo pictured in 2013	Hong Myung-bo	South Korea	Defender	Active
Emilio Butragueño pictured in 2024	Emilio Butragueño	Spain	Forward	Retired
Luis Enrique pictured in 2014	Luis Enrique	Spain	Midfielder/Forward	Active
Raúl pictured in 2011	Raúl	Spain	Forward	Active
Rüştü Reçber pictured in 2010	Rüştü Reçber	Turkey	Goalkeeper	Active
Emre Belözoğlu pictured in 2014	Emre Belözoğlu	Turkey	Midfielder	Active
Andriy Shevchenko pictured in 2004	Andriy Shevchenko	Ukraine	Forward	Active
Michelle Akers pictured in 2026	Michelle Akers	United States	Midfielder/Forward	Retired
Mia Hamm pictured in 1998	Mia Hamm	United States	Forward	Active
Enzo Francescoli pictured in 1984	Enzo Francescoli	Uruguay	Midfielder	Retired

== Statistics ==
Footballers by nationality
Rank	Nationality	No.
1	Brazil	15
2	France	14
2	Italy	14
4	Netherlands	13
5	Argentina	10
5	Germany	10
7	England	7
8	Belgium	3
8	Denmark	3
8	Portugal	3
8	Spain	3
12	Chile	2
12	Czech Republic	2
12	Turkey	2
12	United States	2
16	Bulgaria	1
16	Cameroon	1
16	Colombia	1
16	Croatia	1
16	Ghana	1
16	Hungary	1
16	Japan	1
16	Liberia	1
16	Mexico	1
16	Nigeria	1
16	Northern Ireland	1
16	Paraguay	1
16	Peru	1
16	Poland	1
16	Republic of Ireland	1
16	Romania	1
16	Russia	1
16	Scotland	1
16	Senegal	1
16	South Korea	1
16	Ukraine	1
16	Uruguay	1

Footballers by playing position
Position	No.
Goalkeeper	9
Defender	20
Midfielder	43
Forward	53

Footballers by birth decade
Decade	No.
1920s	5
1930s	7
1940s	15
1950s	22
1960s	35
1970s	37
1980s	4

== See also ==
- World Soccer's Greatest Players of the 20th Century
- World Team of the 20th Century
