= 1967–68 European Cup Winners' Cup =

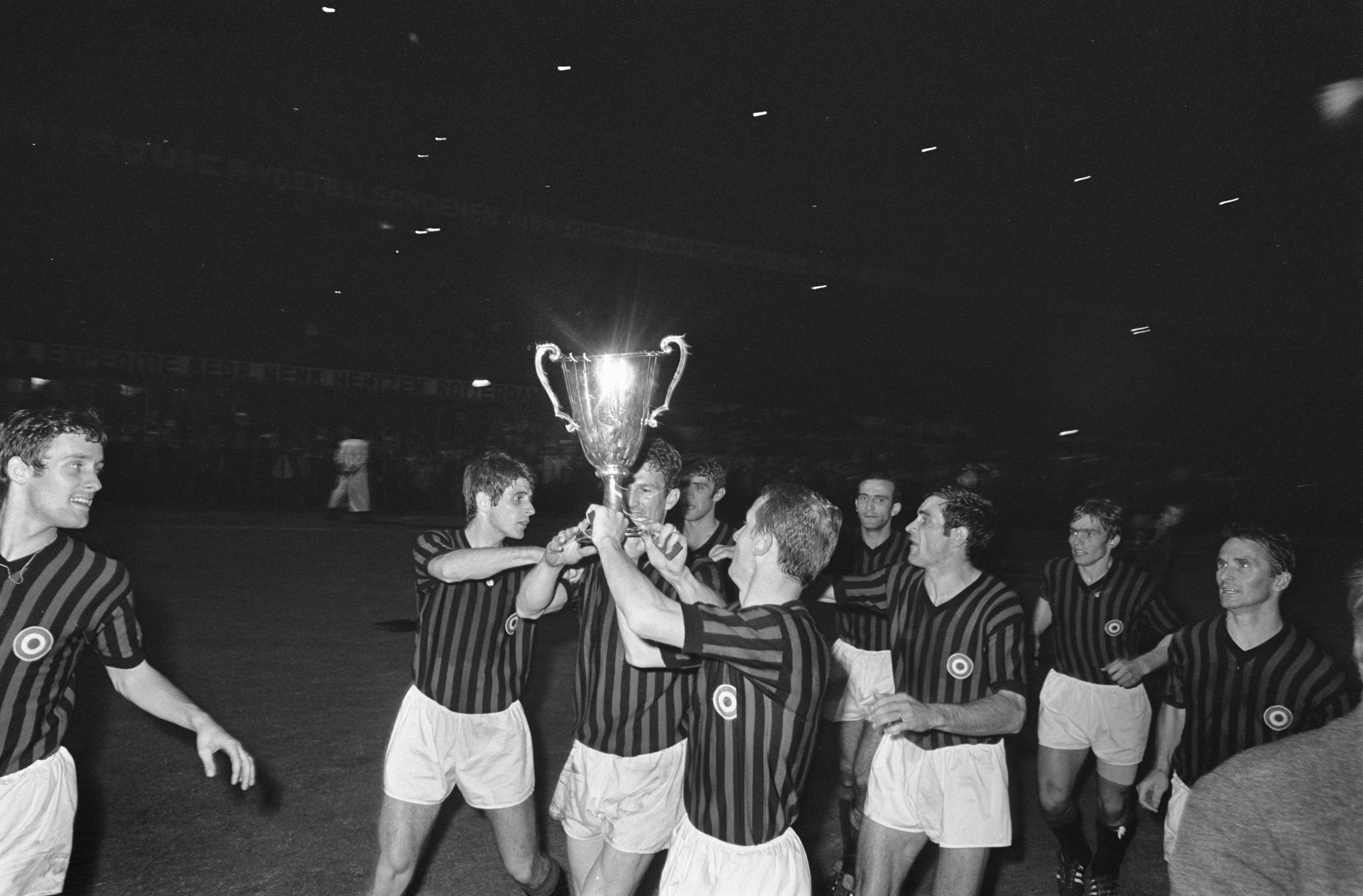
- Champions Milan lifting the trophy

Final positions
- Champions: (Italy) Milan (1st title)
- Runners-up: (West Germany) Hamburger SV

Tournament statistics
- Matches played: 64
- Goals scored: 200 (3.13 per match)
- Top scorer: Uwe Seeler (Hamburger SV) 8 goals

The 1967–68 season of the European Cup Winners' Cup club football tournament was won by Milan following their final victory against Hamburger SV, the fourth West German finalist in four years. Milan beat defending champions Bayern Munich en route to the final.

== Teams ==
Austria Wien (CW)	(Belgium) Standard Liège (CW)	(Bulgaria) Levski Sofia (CW)	(Cyprus) Apollon Limassol (CW)
(Czechoslovakia) Spartak Trnava (CW)	(Denmark) Randers Freja (CW)	(England) Tottenham Hotspur (CW)	(Finland) HJK (CW)
(France) Lyon (CW)	(East Germany) BSG Sachsenring Zwickau (CW)	(West Germany) Bayern Munich (CW)^{TH}	(West Germany) Hamburger SV (CR)
(Greece) Panathinaikos (CW)	(Hungary) Győri ETO (CW)	(Iceland) KR Reykjavík (CW)	(Republic of Ireland) Shamrock Rovers (CW)
(Italy) Milan (CW)	(Luxembourg) Aris Bonnevoie (CW)	(Malta) Floriana (CW)	(Netherlands) NAC Breda (CW)
(Northern Ireland) Crusaders (CW)	(Norway) Fredrikstad (CW)	(Poland) Wisła Kraków (CW)	(Portugal) Vitória de Setúbal (CW)
(Romania) Steaua București (CW)	(Scotland) Aberdeen (CR)	(Spain) Valencia (CW)	(Switzerland) Lausanne Sports (CR)
(Turkey) Altay SK (CW)	(Soviet Union) Torpedo Moscow (CR)	(Wales) Cardiff City (CW)	(Socialist Federal Republic of Yugoslavia) Hajduk Split (CW)

== Bracket ==
First round
(Finland) HJK	1	0	1
(Poland) Wisła Kraków	4	4	8
(West Germany) Hamburger SV	5	2	7
(Denmark) Randers Freja	3	0	3
(Luxembourg) Aris Bonnevoie	0	1	1
(France) Lyon	3	2	5
(Socialist Federal Republic of Yugoslavia) Hajduk Split	0	3	3
(England) Tottenham Hotspur	2	4	6
(Malta) Floriana	1	0	1
(Netherlands) NAC Breda	2	1	3
(Republic of Ireland) Shamrock Rovers	1	0	1
(Wales) Cardiff City	1	2	3
(Soviet Union) Torpedo Moscow	0	1	1
(East Germany) BSG Sachsenring Zwickau	0	0	0
(Switzerland) Lausanne Sports	3	0	3
(Czechoslovakia) Spartak Trnava	2	2	4
(Turkey) Altay SK	2	0	2
(Belgium) Standard Liège	3	0	3
(Scotland) Aberdeen	10	4	14
(Iceland) KR Reykjavík	0	1	1
(Hungary) Győri ETO	5	4	9
(Cyprus) Apollon Limassol	0	0	0
(Italy) Milan	5	1	6
(Bulgaria) Levski Sofia	1	1	2
(Spain) Valencia	4	4	8
(Northern Ireland) Crusaders	0	2	2
Austria Wien	0	1	1
(Romania) Steaua București	2	2	4
(West Germany) Bayern Munich	5	2	7
(Greece) Panathinaikos	0	1	1
(Norway) Fredrikstad	1	1	2
(Portugal) Vitória de Setúbal	5	2	7

Second round
(Poland) Wisła Kraków	0	0	0
(West Germany) Hamburger SV	1	4	5
(France) Lyon (a)	1	3	4
(England) Tottenham Hotspur	0	4	4
(Netherlands) NAC Breda	1	1	2
(Wales) Cardiff City	1	4	5
(Soviet Union) Torpedo Moscow	3	3	6
(Czechoslovakia) Spartak Trnava	0	1	1
(Belgium) Standard Liège	3	0	3
(Scotland) Aberdeen	0	2	2
(Hungary) Győri ETO	2	1	3
(Italy) Milan (a)	2	1	3
(Spain) Valencia	3	0	3
(Romania) Steaua București	0	1	1
(West Germany) Bayern Munich	6	1	7
(Portugal) Vitória de Setúbal	2	1	3

Quarter-finals
(West Germany) Hamburger SV	2	0	2 (2)
(France) Lyon	0	2	2 (0)
(Wales) Cardiff City	1	0	1 (1)
(Soviet Union) Torpedo Moscow	0	1	1 (0)
(Belgium) Standard Liège	1	1	2 (0)
(Italy) Milan	1	1	2 (2)
(Spain) Valencia	1	0	1
(West Germany) Bayern Munich	1	1	2

Semi-finals
(West Germany) Hamburger SV	1	3	4
(Wales) Cardiff City	1	2	3
(Italy) Milan	2	0	2
(West Germany) Bayern Munich	0	0	0

Final
(West Germany) Hamburger SV	0
(Italy) Milan	2

== First round ==
Team 1	Agg.	Team 2	1st leg	2nd leg
Altay SK (Turkey)	2–3	(Belgium) Standard Liège	2–3	0–0
Aberdeen (Scotland)	14–1	(Iceland) KR Reykjavík	10–0	4–1
Győri ETO (Hungary)	9–0	(Cyprus) Apollon Limassol	5–0	4–0
Milan (Italy)	6–2	(Bulgaria) Levski Sofia	5–1	1–1
Valencia (Spain)	8–2	(Northern Ireland) Crusaders	4–0	4–2
Austria Wien	1–4	(Romania) Steaua București	0–2	1–2
Bayern Munich (West Germany)	7–1	(Greece) Panathinaikos	5–0	2–1
Fredrikstad (Norway)	2–7	(Portugal) Vitória de Setúbal	1–5	1–2
HJK (Finland)	1–8	(Poland) Wisła Kraków	1–4	0–4
Hamburger SV (West Germany)	7–3	(Denmark) Randers Freja	5–3	2–0
Aris Bonnevoie (Luxembourg)	1–5	(France) Lyon	0–3	1–2
Hajduk Split (Socialist Federal Republic of Yugoslavia)	3–6	(England) Tottenham Hotspur	0–2	3–4
Floriana (Malta)	1–3	(Netherlands) NAC Breda	1–2	0–1
Shamrock Rovers (Republic of Ireland)	1–3	(Wales) Cardiff City	1–1	0–2
Torpedo Moscow (Soviet Union)	1–0	(East Germany) BSG Sachsenring Zwickau	0–0	1–0
Lausanne Sports (Switzerland)	3–4	(Czechoslovakia) Spartak Trnava	3–2	0–2

=== First leg ===
20 September 1967

Altay SK (Turkey)	2–3	(Belgium) Standard Liège
Akı 23'; İçten 42'		Colonval 11'; Claessen 72', 82'

Alsancak Stadium, İzmir
Referee: Vasile Dumitrescu (Romania)

6 September 1967

Aberdeen (Scotland)	10–0	(Iceland) KR Reykjavik
Munro 19', 52', 61'; Storrie 21', 57'; Smith 31', 80'; McMillan 45'; Taylor 48'; Petersen 72'

Pittodrie Stadium, Aberdeen
Referee: Adrianus Aalbrecht (Netherlands)

20 September 1967

Győri ETO (Hungary)	5–0	(Cyprus) Apollon Limassol
Nell 19'; Györffi 25'; Varsányi 48'; Szaló 80', 83'

Vagongyári ETO pálya, Győr
Attendance: 10,000
Referee: Paul Schiller (Austria)

20 September 1967

Milan (Italy)	5–1	(Bulgaria) Levski Sofia
Sormani 50'; Hamrin 51', 74'; Anquilletti 81', 86'		Asparuhov 63'

San Siro, Milan
Attendance: 39,779
Referee: Konstantin Zečević (Yugoslavia)

20 September 1967

Valencia (Spain)	4–0	(Northern Ireland) Crusaders
Ansola 2', 13'; Jara 28' (pen.); Waldo 55'

Mestalla Stadium, Valencia
Referee: Roger Mâchin (France)

13 September 1967

Austria Wien	0–2	(Romania) Steaua București
	Report	Șoo 42'; Avram 70'

Praterstadion, Vienna
Attendance: 14,433
Referee: Ivan Placek (Czechoslovakia)

20 September 1967

Bayern Munich (West Germany)	5–0	(Greece) Panathinaikos
Müller 13' (pen.), 46'; Kupferschmidt 25'; Beckenbauer 32'; Jung 57'

Grünwalder Stadion, Munich
Referee: Ken Dagnall (England)

20 September 1967

Fredrikstad (Norway)	1–5	(Portugal) Vitória Setúbal
Fuglset 72'		Pedras 20', 33'; José Maria 43'; Guerreiro 63', 78'

Fredrikstad Idræts- og Fotbaldplads, Fredrikstad
Attendance: 5,204
Referee: Gunnar Michaelsen (Denmark)

20 September 1967

HJK (Finland)	1–4	(Poland) Wisła Kraków
Pajo 76'		Skupnik 10'; Lendzion 14', 27'; Sykta 66'

Olympiastadion, Helsinki
Referee: Erwin Vetter (East Germany)

6 September 1967

Hamburger SV (West Germany)	5–3	(Denmark) Randers Freja
Seeler 3', 28', 83'; Krämer 55'; Hönig 64'		Andreasen 18'; Sørensen 68'; Gaardsøe 90'

Volksparkstadion, Hamburg
Referee: Peter Coates (Ireland)

20 September 1967

Aris Bonnevoie (Luxembourg)	0–3	(France) Lyon
		Pin 22'; Di Nallo 39', 63'

Stade Municipal, Luxembourg City
Referee: Hans-Joachim Weyland (West Germany)

20 September 1967

Hajduk Split (Socialist Federal Republic of Yugoslavia)	0–2	(England) Tottenham Hotspur
		Robertson 4'; Greaves 88'

Plinara Stadion, Split
Referee: Todor Bechirov (Bulgaria)

21 September 1967

Floriana (Malta)	1–2	(Netherlands) NAC Breda
Buttigieg 49'		Visschers 48', 69'

Empire Stadium, Gżira
Referee: Francesco Francescon (Italy)

20 September 1967

Shamrock Rovers (Republic of Ireland)	1–1	(Wales) Cardiff City
Gilbert 16'		King 48'

Dalymount Park, Dublin
Referee: Piet Roomer (Netherlands)

20 September 1967

Torpedo Moscow (Soviet Union)	0–0	(East Germany) BSG Sachsenring Zwickau

Central Lenin Stadium, Moscow
Referee: Pekka Aho (Finland)

20 September 1967

Lausanne Sports (Switzerland)	3–2	(Czechoslovakia) Spartak Trnava
Kerkhoffs 33', 43'; Armbruster 90'		Švec 8', 17'

Stade Olympique de la Pontaise, Lausanne
Attendance: 7625
Referee: Ronald Jones (Wales)

=== Second leg ===
18 October 1967

Standard Liège (Belgium)	0–0	(Turkey) Altay SK

Stade Maurice Dufrasne, Liège
Referee: Gottfried Dienst (Switzerland)

Standard Liège won 3–2 on aggregate.

13 September 1967

KR Reykjavik (Iceland)	1–4	(Scotland) Aberdeen
Hafsteinsson 72'		Storrie 43', 58'; Buchan 44'; Munro 53'

Laugardalsvöllur, Reykjavík
Referee: Ivar Hornslien (Norway)

Aberdeen won 14–1 on aggregate.

23 September 1967

Apollon Limassol (Cyprus)	0–4	(Hungary) Győri ETO
		Kiss 63'; Szaló 65'; Varsányi 72'; Stolcz 79'

Sóstói Stadium, Székesfehérvár
Attendance: 4,000
Referee: Paul Schiller (Austria)

Győri ETO won 9-0 on aggregate.

11 October 1967

Levski Sofia (Bulgaria)	1–1	(Italy) Milan
Asparuhov 75'		Sormani 12'

Vasil Levski National Stadium, Sofia
Attendance: 24,864
Referee: Faruk Talu (Turkey)

Milan won 6–2 on aggregate.

11 October 1967

Crusaders (Northern Ireland)	2–4	(Spain) Valencia
Trainor 3'; Magill 69'		Paquito 14', 33', 63'; Ansola 41'

The Oval, Belfast
Referee: Joseph Hannet (Belgium)

Valencia won 8–2 on aggregate.

27 September 1967

Steaua București (Romania)	2–1	Austria Wien
Manea 24'; Negrea 85'	Report	Marković 37'

Stadionul Republicii, Bucharest
Attendance: 9,101
Referee: Timoleon Latsios (Greece)

Steaua București won 4–1 on aggregate.

18 October 1967

Panathinaikos (Greece)	1–2	(West Germany) Bayern Munich
Kalaitzidis 68'		Müller 8'; Koulmann 89'

Leoforos Alexandras Stadium, Athens
Attendance: 29,667
Referee: Jacques Colling (Luxembourg)

Bayern Munich won 7–1 on aggregate.

5 October 1967

Vitória Setúbal (Portugal)	2–1	(Norway) Fredrikstad
Pedras 5'; Bonjour 50'		Arntsen 59'

Estádio do Bonfim, Setúbal
Attendance: 6,546
Referee: Daniel Zariquiegui Izco (Spain)

Vitória Setúbal won 7–2 on aggregate.

4 October 1967

Wisła Kraków (Poland)	4–0	(Finland) HJK
Rainiala 25' (o.g.); Skupnik 44'; Wójcik 60'; Sykta 79'

Henryk Reyman Municipal Stadium, Kraków
Referee: Anvar Zverev (Soviet Union)

Wisła Kraków won 8–1 on aggregate.

20 September 1967

Randers Freja (Denmark)	0–2	(West Germany) Hamburger SV
		Kurbjuhn 2'; Dieckmann 21'

Randers Stadium, Randers
Referee: Birger Nilsen (Norway)

Hamburger SV won 7–3 on aggregate.

4 October 1967

Lyon (France)	2–1	(Luxembourg) Aris Bonnevoie
Pin 5'; Maison 28' (pen.)		Heger 79'

Stade de Gerland, Lyon
Referee: John Gordon (Scotland)

Lyon won 5–1 on aggregate.

27 September 1967

Tottenham Hotspur (England)	4–3	(Socialist Federal Republic of Yugoslavia) Hajduk Split
Robertson 20', 83'; Gilzean 34'; Venables 38'		Vardić 81'; Mušović 82'; Hlevnjak 89'

White Hart Lane, London
Referee: Joaquim Fernandes dos Campos (Portugal)

Tottenham Hotspur won 6–3 on aggregate.

12 October 1967

NAC Breda (Netherlands)	1–0	(Malta) Floriana
Pirard 56'

Philips Stadion, Eindhoven
Referee: John Adair (Northern Ireland)

NAC Breda won 3–1 on aggregate.

4 October 1967

Cardiff City (Wales)	2–0	(Republic of Ireland) Shamrock Rovers
Toshack 30'; Brown 74' (pen.)

Ninian Park, Cardiff
Referee: Vital Loraux (Belgium)

Cardiff City won 3–1 on aggregate.

4 October 1967

BSG Sachsenring Zwickau (East Germany)	0–1	(Soviet Union) Torpedo Moscow
		Streltsov 68'

Westsachsenstadion, Zwickau
Referee: Ryszard Banasiuk (Poland)

Torpedo Moscow won 1–0 on aggregate.

11 October 1967

Spartak Trnava (Czechoslovakia)	2–0	(Switzerland) Lausanne Sports
Adamec 25'; Martinkovič 90'

Spartak, Trnava
Attendance: 9588
Referee: Karl Riegg (West Germany)

Spartak Trnava won 4–3 on aggregate.

== Second round ==
Team 1	Agg.	Team 2	1st leg	2nd leg
Standard Liège (Belgium)	3–2	(Scotland) Aberdeen	3–0	0–2
Győri ETO (Hungary)	3–3 (a)	(Italy) Milan	2–2	1–1
Valencia (Spain)	3–1	(Romania) Steaua București	3–0	0–1
Bayern Munich (West Germany)	7–3	(Portugal) Vitória de Setúbal	6–2	1–1
Wisła Kraków (Poland)	0–5	(West Germany) Hamburger SV	0–1	0–4
Lyon (France)	4–4 (a)	(England) Tottenham Hotspur	1–0	3–4
NAC Breda (Netherlands)	2–5	(Wales) Cardiff City	1–1	1–4
Torpedo Moscow (Soviet Union)	6–1	(Czechoslovakia) Spartak Trnava	3–0	3–1

=== First leg ===
29 November 1967

Standard Liège (Belgium)	3–0	(Scotland) Aberdeen
Claessen 6'; Jurkiewicz 11'; Pilot 66'

Stade Maurice Dufrasne, Liège
Referee: Salvador Heliodoro Garcia (Portugal)

22 November 1967

Győri ETO (Hungary)	2–2	(Italy) Milan
Györfi 29', 80'		Sormani 19', 81'

Vagongyári ETO pálya, Győr
Attendance: 15,533
Referee: Gottfried Dienst (Switzerland)

30 November 1967

Valencia (Spain)	3–0	(Romania) Steaua București
Claramunt 1'; Ansola 44', 74'	Report

Mestalla Stadium, Valencia
Attendance: 22,049
Referee: Francesco Francescon (Italy)

8 November 1967

Bayern Munich (West Germany)	6–2	(Portugal) Vitória Setúbal
Müller 8', 59', 89' (pen.); Brenninger 20'; Ohlhauser 27'; Nafziger 50'		Pedras 7'; Tomé 81'

Grünwalder Stadion, Munich
Attendance: 18,341
Referee: Kevin Howley (England)

15 November 1967

Wisła Kraków (Poland)	0–1	(West Germany) Hamburger SV
		Seeler 57'

Henryk Reyman Municipal Stadium, Kraków
Referee: Gocho Rusev (Bulgaria)

29 November 1967

Lyon (France)	1–0	(England) Tottenham Hotspur
Di Nallo 75'	Report Report 2 Report 3

Stade de Gerland, Lyon
Attendance: 10,997
Referee: Josef Krnavek (Czechoslovakia)

15 November 1967

NAC Breda (Netherlands)	1–1	(Wales) Cardiff City
Visschers 9'		King 68'

Philips Stadion, Eindhoven
Referee: Kåre Sirevaag (Norway)

25 November 1967

Torpedo Moscow (Soviet Union)	3–0	(Czechoslovakia) Spartak Trnava
Shcherbakov 17'; Pakhomov 41'; Voronin 62'

Pakhtakor Central Stadium, Tashkent
Attendance: 35432
Referee: Ferdinand Marschall (Austria)

=== Second leg ===
6 December 1967

Aberdeen (Scotland)	2–0	(Belgium) Standard Liège
Munro 20'; Melrose 66'

Pittodrie Stadium, Aberdeen
Referee: Magnús Pétursson (Iceland)

Standard Liège won 3–2 on aggregate.

7 December 1967

Milan (Italy)	1–1	(Hungary) Győri ETO
Prati 22'		Szaló 6'

San Siro, Milan
Attendance: 17,757
Referee: Helmut Fritz (West Germany)

3–3 on aggregate; Milan won on away goals.

14 December 1967

Steaua București (Romania)	1–0	(Spain) Valencia
Constantin 12'	Report

Stadionul Republicii, Bucharest
Attendance: 10,000
Referee: Milovoje Gugulovic (Yugoslavia)

Valencia won 3–1 on aggregate.

14 November 1967

Vitória Setúbal (Portugal)	1–1	(West Germany) Bayern Munich
Pedras 68'		Ohlhauser 75'

Estádio do Bonfim, Setúbal
Attendance: 5,259
Referee: Roger Barde (France)

Bayern Munich won 7–3 on aggregate.

29 November 1967

Hamburger SV (West Germany)	4–0	(Poland) Wisła Kraków
Schulz 24', 43'; Kurbjuhn 41'; Seeler 57'

Volksparkstadion, Hamburg
Referee: Patrick Graham (Republic of Ireland)

Hamburger SV won 5–0 on aggregate.

13 December 1967

Tottenham Hotspur (England)	4–3	(France) Lyon
Greaves 20', 44' (pen.); Jones 45'; Gilzean 69'	Report Report 2	Di Nallo 55'; Rambert 57'; Bouassa 79'

White Hart Lane, London
Attendance: 41,895
Referee: José María Ortiz de Mendíbil (Spain)

4–4 on aggregate; Lyon won on away goals.

29 November 1967

Cardiff City (Wales)	4–1	(Netherlands) NAC Breda
Brown 2'; Jones 19'; Clarke 66'; Toshack 67'		Nouwens 29'

Ninian Park, Cardiff
Referee: Gunnar Michaelsen (Denmark)

Cardiff City won 5–2 on aggregate.

30 November 1967

Spartak Trnava (Czechoslovakia)	1–3	(Soviet Union) Torpedo Moscow
Kuna 63'		Pais 10'; Streltsov 16', 57'

Spartak, Trnava
Attendance: 13571
Referee: Adrianus Aalbrecht (Netherlands)

Torpedo Moscow won 6–1 on aggregate.

== Quarter-finals ==
Team 1	Agg.	Team 2	1st leg	2nd leg
Standard Liège (Belgium)	2–2^{1}	(Italy) Milan	1–1	1–1 (a.e.t.)
Valencia (Spain)	1–2	(West Germany) Bayern Munich	1–1	0–1
Hamburger SV (West Germany)	2–2^{2}	(France) Lyon	2–0	0–2
Cardiff City (Wales)	1–1^{3}	(Soviet Union) Torpedo Moscow	1–0	0–1

^{1} Milan beat Standard Liège 2–0 in a play-off.

^{2} Hamburg beat Lyon 2–0 in a play-off.

^{3} Cardiff City beat Torpedo Moscow 1–0 in a play-off.

=== First leg ===
28 February 1968

Standard Liège (Belgium)	1–1	(Italy) Milan
Claessen 38'		Prati 20'

Stade Maurice Dufrasne, Liège
Attendance: 28,730
Referee: István Zsolt (Hungary)

14 February 1968

Valencia (Spain)	1–1	(West Germany) Bayern Munich
Vilar 6'		Mestre 77' (o.g.)

Mestalla Stadium, Valencia
Referee: Michel Kitabdjian (France)

21 February 1968

Hamburger SV (West Germany)	2–0	(France) Lyon
Dieckmann 81'; Nafziger 50'

Volksparkstadion, Hamburg
Referee: Anvar Zverev (Soviet Union)

6 March 1968

Cardiff City (Wales)	1–0	(Soviet Union) Torpedo Moscow
Jones 44'

Ninian Park, Cardiff
Referee: Robert Schaut (Belgium)

=== Second leg ===
13 March 1968

Milan (Italy)	1–1 (a.e.t.)	(Belgium) Standard Liège
Rognoni 40'		Jurkiewicz 74'

San Siro, Milan
Attendance: 55,146
Referee: Juan Gardeazábal Garay (Spain)

2–2 on aggregate.

13 March 1968

Bayern Munich (West Germany)	1–0	(Spain) Valencia
Müller 3'

Grünwalder Stadion, Munich
Referee: Ken Dagnall (England)

Bayern Munich won 3–1 on aggregate.

13 March 1968

Lyon (France)	2–0 (a.e.t.)	(West Germany) Hamburger SV
Di Nallo 19', 82'

Stade de Gerland, Lyon
Referee: Tom Wharton (Scotland)

2–2 on aggregate.

19 March 1968

Torpedo Moscow (Soviet Union)	1–0 (a.e.t.)	(Wales) Cardiff City
Gershkovich 43'

Pakhtakor Central Stadium, Tashkent
Referee: Bertil Lööw (Sweden)

1–1 on aggregate.

=== Play-offs ===
20 March 1968

Milan (Italy)	2–0	(Belgium) Standard Liège
Prati 3'; Rivera 47'

San Siro, Milan
Attendance: 40,362
Referee: Roger Barde (France)

Milan won play-off 2–0.

20 March 1968

Hamburger SV (West Germany)	2–0	(France) Lyon
Seeler 47', 59' (pen.)

Volksparkstadion, Hamburg
Referee: Adrianus Aalbrecht (Netherlands)

Hamburg won play-off 2–0.

3 April 1968

Cardiff City (Wales)	1–0	(Soviet Union) Torpedo Moscow
Dean 42'

Rosenaustadion, Augsburg
Referee: Helmut Fritz (West Germany)

Cardiff City won play-off 1–0.

== Semi-finals ==
Team 1	Agg.	Team 2	1st leg	2nd leg
Milan (Italy)	2–0	(West Germany) Bayern Munich	2–0	0–0
Hamburger SV (West Germany)	4–3	(Wales) Cardiff City	1–1	3–2

=== First leg ===
1 May 1968

Milan (Italy)	2–0	(West Germany) Bayern Munich
Sormani 51'; Prati 73'	Report Report 2

San Siro, Milan
Attendance: 70,158
Referee: Salvador Heliodoro Garcia (Portugal)

24 April 1968

Hamburger SV (West Germany)	1–1	(Wales) Cardiff City
Sandmann 68'	Report Report 2	Dean 42'

Volksparkstadion, Hamburg
Referee: José María Ortiz de Mendíbil (Spain)

=== Second leg ===
8 May 1968

Bayern Munich (West Germany)	0–0	(Italy) Milan
	Report Report 2

Grünwalder Stadion, Munich
Attendance: 39,061
Referee: Gottfried Dienst Switzerland)

Milan won 2–0 on aggregate.

1 May 1968

Cardiff City (Wales)	2–3	(West Germany) Hamburger SV
Dean 11'; Harris 78'	Report Report 2	Hönig 16', 81'; Seeler 86'

Ninian Park, Cardiff
Referee: Laurens van Ravens (Netherlands)

Hamburg won 4–3 on aggregate.

== Final ==
23 May 1968
19:00

Hamburger SV (West Germany)	0–2	(Italy) Milan
	Report Report 2	Hamrin 3', 18'

Feijenoord Stadion, Rotterdam
Attendance: 53,276
Referee: José María Ortiz de Mendíbil (Spain)

== Top scorers ==
The top scorers from the 1967–68 European Cup Winners' Cup are as follows:

Rank	Name	Team	Goals
1	(West Germany) Uwe Seeler	(West Germany) Hamburger SV	8
2	(West Germany) Gerd Müller	(West Germany) Bayern Munich	7
3	(France) Fleury Di Nallo	(France) Lyon	6
4	(Spain) Fernando Ansola	(Spain) Valencia	5
4	(Scotland) Frank Munro	(Scotland) Aberdeen	5
4	(Portugal) Pedras	(Portugal) Vitória Setúbal	5
4	(Italy) Angelo Sormani	(Italy) Milan	5
8	(Belgium) Roger Claessen	(Belgium) Standard Liège	4
8	(Sweden) Kurt Hamrin	(Italy) Milan	4
8	(Italy) Pierino Prati	(Italy) Milan	4
8	(Scotland) Jim Storrie	(Scotland) Aberdeen	4
8	(Hungary) József Szaló	(Hungary) Győri ETO	4

== See also ==
- 1967–68 European Cup
- 1967–68 Inter-Cities Fairs Cup
