= 1965–66 S.L. Benfica season =

Benfica
1965–66 season
- President: António Catarino Duarte (until 17 June 1966); José Ferreira Queimado
- Head coach: Béla Guttmann
- Stadium: Estádio da Luz
- Primeira Divisão: 2nd
- Taça de Portugal: Quarter-finals
- European Cup: Quarter-finals
- Top goalscorer: League: Eusébio (25); All: Eusébio (37)
- Biggest win: Benfica 10–0 Stade Dudelange (5 October 1965)
- Biggest defeat: Benfica 1–5 Manchester United (9 March 1966)
Home colours	Away colours

The 1965–66 season was Sport Lisboa e Benfica's 62st season in existence and the club's 32st consecutive season in the top flight of Portuguese football, covering the period from 1 August 1965 to 31 July 1966. Domestically, Benfica competed in the Primeira Divisão and Taça de Portugal, while internationally participated in the European Cup.

Béla Guttmann returned for a fourth season as manager, the squad underwent several changes: Ângelo Martins and Domingos Fernandes departed, while Alfredo José Ferreira Pinto and Nélson Fernandes joined the club. Amidst high expectations what followed was a disappointing season finishing second in the league, being eliminated in the quarter-finals of the Taça de Portugal, and losing 8–3 on aggregate to Manchester United in the European Cup, failing to qualify for the European Cup for the first time five years.

== Season summary ==
Like in the previous three seasons, despite winning the league, failure to achieve Benfica's main objective, the European Cup, led the board of directors to part ways with Elek Schwartz and bring back two-time European Cup winner Béla Guttmann.

During the summer transfer window, the squad underwent several changes: Ângelo Martins and Domingos Fernandes departed, while Alfredo José Ferreira Pinto and Nélson Fernandes joined the team.

Pre-season started with a participation in the Ramón de Carranza Trophy, where Benfica defeated Real Betis 2–1 in the semi-finals before losing 3–2 to Real Zaragoza in the final. Next they overcame Belenenses 4–3 to reach the final of the Taça de Honra, but were defeated 2–1 by Sporting.

The official season began on 12 September with a 2–2 draw against Académica in the opening round of the Primeira Divisão, followed by a 2–0 win over CUF and a 2–0 away loss to Porto. In European competition, Benfica defeated Stade Dudelange 18–0 on aggregate.

In October, Benfica began with league victories over Varzim and Lusitano de Évora, but then suffered a 4–2 home defeat to Sporting, left the team in fourth place, three points behind the leaders. In November, Benfica opened with a 2–0 win over Oliveirense in the first round of the Taça de Portugal. This was followed by a draw in the second round of the European Cup against Levski Sofia, a league draw with Beira-Mar, and an 8–2 victory over Barreirense. The month ended with Benfica in third place, four points of first place.

In December, Benfica won their first three league matches, but a 4–4 draw with Vitória de Setúbal meant the gap to the top remained at four points. In Europe, after the first-leg draw, Benfica defeated Levski Sofia 3–2 to advance to the quarter-finals. Benfica began the new year with a 2–0 win over Belenenses, closing the first half of the league season with 19 points, four behind Sporting. In January, the team recorded three more victories, including a 3–1 win over Porto, reducing the gap to two points. However, a 1–1 draw with Varzim at the end of the month saw the difference increase again to three points. February brought mixed results: four consecutive league wins, including a 2–0 away victory over Sporting, allowed Benfica to draw level on points with their rivals. In the European Cup, the team travelled to England to face Manchester United, losing 3–2. Following a strong February, March proved disappointing. In the league, a 2–1 win over Leixões was followed by a 3–2 away defeat to Vitória de Guimarães, dropping Benfica to second place, one point behind Sporting. In the Taça de Portugal, a 2–2 away draw and a 5–1 home victory over Portimonense secured passage to the quarter-finals. In Europe, however, a 5–1 home defeat to Manchester United eliminated the team from the European Cup.

After a difficult month, Benfica closed the league campaign with two wins and a draw in their final three matches, finishing in second place, one point behind Sporting. In the Taça de Portugal, a 5–4 aggregate defeat in the quarter-finals led to elimination, marking the club's first trophyless season in eight years.

== Competitions ==
Win Draw Loss Postponed

=== Overall record ===
Competition	First match	Last match	Record								
Competition	First match	Last match	G	W	D	L	GF	GA	GD	Win %	Source
Primeira Divisão	12 September 1965	1 May 1966	26	18	5	3	73	30	+43	69.23	
Taça de Portugal	6 November 1965	17 April 1966	6	4	1	1	17	9	+8	66.67	
European Cup	30 September 1965	9 March 1966	6	3	1	2	26	12	+14	50.00	
Total			38	25	7	6	116	51	+65	65.79	

== League standings ==
Pos	Team	Pld	W	D	L	GF	GA	GD	Pts	Qualification or relegation
1	Sporting CP (C)	26	18	6	2	70	21	+49	42	Qualification to European Cup first round
2	Benfica	26	18	5	3	73	30	+43	41	Qualification to Inter-Cities Fairs Cup first round
3	Porto	26	14	6	6	41	25	+16	34	Qualification to Inter-Cities Fairs Cup first round
4	Vitória de Guimarães	26	14	5	7	58	47	+11	33	
5	Vitória de Setúbal	26	11	7	8	51	36	+15	29	Qualification to Inter-Cities Fairs Cup first round

Source: RSSSF
(C) Champions

=== Results by round ===
==== Matches ====
12 September 1965 1	Académica	2–2	Benfica	Lisbon
17:00	Ernesto 19'; Vítor Campos 44'		Eusébio 16', 43'	Stadium: Estádio Municipal de Coimbra; Referee: Francisco Guerra

19 September 1965 2	Benfica	6-1	CUF	Lisbon
	Eusébio 27', 46', 47'; Pedras 36'; Yaúca 39'; Coluna 71'		Mário João 10'	Stadium: Estádio da Luz; Referee: Aniceto Nogueira

26 September 1965 3	Porto	2–0	Benfica	Porto
	Naftal 32'; Nóbrega 73'			Stadium: Estádio das Antas; Referee: Encarnação Salgado

3 October 1965 4	Benfica	1–0	Varzim	Lisbon
	Eusébio 36'			Stadium: Estádio da Luz; Referee: Virgílio Baptista

10 October 1965 5	Lusitano de Évora	1–2	Benfica	Évora
	Vaz 89'		Torres 63'; Pedras 69'	Stadium: Campo Estrela; Referee: Porfírio Silva

17 October 1965 6	Benfica	2–4	Sporting	Lisbon
	Eusébio 18'; Torres 88'		Lourenço 16', 40', 68', 77'	Stadium: Estádio da Luz; Referee: Aníbal Oliveira

14 November 1965 7	Beira-Mar	1–1	Benfica	Aveiro
	Gaio 46'		Coluna 79'	Stadium: Estádio Mário Duarte; Referee: João Pinto Ferreira

28 November 1965 8	Benfica	8–2	Barreirense	Lisbon
	Nélson Fernandes 1'; Torres 13', 20', 28', 42', 74'; Coluna 51'; Raúl Machado 63'		Ludovico 25', 87'	Stadium: Estádio da Luz; Referee: Manuel Fortunato

5 December 1965 9	Leixões	0–1	Benfica	Matosinhos
			Torres 31'	Stadium: Estádio das Antas; Referee: António Amaro

12 December 1965 10	Benfica	4–2	Vitória de Guimarães	Lisbon
	Eusébio 27', 50'; Torres 51', 74'		Mário Vieira 73'; Peres 78' (penalty)	Stadium: Estádio da Luz; Referee: Encarnação Salgado

19 December 1965 11	Benfica	4–1	Braga	Lisbon
	Mário dos Santos 33' (penalty); Eusébio 39' (penalty) 60'; Augusto 74'		Bino 49'	Stadium: Estádio da Luz

26 December 1965 12	Vitória de Setúbal	4–4	Benfica	Setúbal
	Carlos Manuel 13', 48', 57'; José Maria 66'		Augusto 3', 86'; Torres 77'; Eusébio 87'

2 January 1966 13	Benfica	2–0	Belenenses	Lisbon
	Simões 34', 79'			Stadium: Estádio da Luz; Referee: João Pinto Ferreira

9 January 1966 14	Benfica	4–0	Académica	Lisbon
	Simões 1', 89'; Eusébio 51'; Augusto 73'			Stadium: Estádio da Luz; Referee: Virgílio Baptista

16 January 1966 15	CUF	1–3	Benfica	Barreiro
	José Monteiro 86'		Nélson Fernandes 29'; Augusto 51' (penalty); Torres 77'	Stadium: Estádio Alfredo da Silva; Referee: Renato Santos

23 January 1966 16	Benfica	3–1	Porto	Lisbon
	Eusébio 12' (penalty) 38'; Torres 67'		Manuel António 52'	Stadium: Estádio da Luz; Referee: Manuel Fortunato

30 January 1966 17	Varzim	1–1	Benfica	Varzim
	Nunes Pinto 75'		Eusébio 37'

7 February 1966 18	Benfica	1–0	Lusitano de Évora	Lisbon
	Eusébio 48' (penalty)			Stadium: Estádio da Luz

13 February 1966 19	Sporting	0–2	Benfica	Lisbon
			Eusébio 53'; Torres 73'	Stadium: Estádio José Alvalade; Referee: Virgílio Baptista

13 February 1966 20	Benfica	5–0	Beira-Mar	Lisbon
	Nélson Fernandes 24'; Eusébio 25', 56', 77'; Torres 41'			Stadium: Estádio da Luz; Referee: Virgílio Baptista

27 February 1966 21	Barreirense	1–7	Benfica	Torres Vedras
	Ludovico 75'		Torres 10', 30'; Simões 12'; Eusébio 42'; Augusto 57', 61', 63'	Referee: João Pinto Ferreira

5 March 1966 22	Benfica	2–0	Leixões	Lisbon
	Torres 22'; Nélson Fernandes 76'			Stadium: Estádio da Luz; Referee: Encarnação Salgado

28 March 1966 23	Vitória de Guimarães	3–2	Benfica	Guimarães
	António Mendes 19'; Paulino 41'; Peres 58'		Eusébio 54'; Simões 68'	Stadium: Estádio D. Afonso Henriques

3 April 1966 24	Braga	0–0	Benfica	Braga
				Stadium: Estádio 28 de Maio

24 April 1966 25	Benfica	3–2	Vitória de Setúbal	Lisbon
	Simões 7'; Eusébio 53'; Carriço 55' (o.g.)		Fernando Tomé 4'; Jaime Graça 69'	Stadium: Estádio da Luz; Referee: Fernando Santos

1 May 1966 26	Belenenses	1–3	Benfica	Belém
	Ramos 40'		Augusto 46', 76'; Eusébio 85'	Stadium: Estádio do Restelo

=== Taça de Portugal ===
==== First round ====
6 November 1965	Benfica	2–0	Oliveirense	Lisbon
	Nélson Fernandes 3'; Jacinto Santos 79' (penalty)			Stadium: Estádio da Luz; Referee: João Calado

==== Second round ====
1 December 1965	Alhandra	1–4	Benfica	Lisbon
			Nélson Fernandes 48'; Iaúca 53'; Félix Guerreiro 60'; Jacinto Santos 83' (penalty)	Stadium: Estádio Engenheiro Carlos Salema; Referee: Salvador Garcia

==== Third Round ====
13 March 1966 First leg	Portimonense	2–2	Benfica	Portimão
	Fernando Ramos 17'; Arquimino Galhardo 20'		Yaúca 24', 70'

20 March 1966 Second leg	Benfica	5–1 (7–3 agg.)	Portimonense	Lisbon
	Eusébio 24', 29', 78'; Nélson Fernandes 73', 84'		Carlitos 75'	Stadium: Estádio da Luz; Referee: Braga Barros

==== Quarter-finals ====
10 April 1966 First leg	Braga	4–1	Benfica	Braga
	Adão Craveiro 53', 61'; Bino 63'; Miguel Perrichon 74'		Nélson Fernandes 34'	Stadium: Estádio 28 de Maio

17 April 1966 Second leg	Benfica	3–1 (3–4 agg.)	Braga	Lisbon
	Eusébio 40', 53' (penalty); Torres 69'		Adão Craveiro 21'	Stadium: Estádio da Luz

=== European Cup ===
==== First round ====
16 September 1965 First leg	(Luxembourg) Stade Dudelange	0–8	(Portugal) Sport Lisboa e Benfica	Esch-sur-Alzette
		Report	Pedras 15', 21', 78'; Serafim 29'; Brenner 46' (o.g.); Yaúca 59', 81'; Santana 85'	Stadium: Stade de la Frontière; Attendance: 4,570; Referee: Werner Treichel (West Germany)

5 October 1965; Second leg	Benfica (Portugal)	10–0 (18–0 agg.)	(Luxembourg) Stade Dudelange	Estadio da Luz, Lisbon
	Eusébio 5', 29', 31', 81'; Augusto 12', 23', 59'; Pinto 49'; Guerreiro 54'; Torres 70'	Report		Attendance: 4,598; Referee: Robert Lacoste (France)

==== Second Round ====
10 November 1965; First leg	Levski Sofia (Bulgaria)	2–2	(Portugal) Benfica	Stadion Levski, Sofia
	Asparuhov 5'; Nikolov 59'	Report	Eusébio 22', 63'	Attendance: 25,315; Referee: Gyula Gere (Hungary)

8 December 1965; Second leg	Benfica (Portugal)	3–2 (5–4 agg.)	(Bulgaria) Levski Sofia	Estádio da Luz, Lisbon
	Eusébio 6'; Coluna 27'; Torres 47'	Report	Asparuhov 3', 73'	Attendance: 39,992; Referee: Henri Faucheux (France)

==== Quarter-Finals ====
2 February 1966; First leg	Manchester United (England)	3–2	(Portugal) Benfica	Old Trafford, Manchester
	Herd 35'; Law 45'; Foulkes 60'	Report	Augusto 10'; Torres 80'	Attendance: 64,035; Referee: Karol Galba (Czechoslovakia)

9 March 1966; Second leg	Benfica (Portugal)	1–5 (3–8 agg.)	(England) Manchester United	Estádio da Luz, Lisbon
	Brennan 51' (o.g.)	Report	Best 6', 11'; Connelly 14'; Crerand 76'; Charlton 87'	Attendance: 54,232; Referee: Concetto Lo Bello (Italy)

=== Non-official matches ===
==== Ramón de Carranza Trophy ====
28 August 1965; Semi-Final	Benfica	2–1	Real Betis	Cádiz
	Eusébio 51', 59'	Report	Rios 83'	Stadium: Estadio Ramón de Carranza; Referee: José Ortiz de Mendíbil

29 August 1965; Final	Benfica	2–3	Real Zaragoza	Cádiz
	Torres 11'; Eusébio 87'	Report	Violeta 4'; Santos 69'; Villa 77'	Stadium: Estadio Ramon de Carranza

==== Friendlies ====
1 September 1965; Taça de Honra; Semi-Finals	Belenenses	3–4	Benfica	Belém
	Lura 10', 15'; Gaspar 71'		Félix Guerreiro 34'; Pedras 53', 81'; Nélson Fernandes 61'	Stadium: Estádio do Restelo

5 September 1965; Taça de Honra; Final	Benfica	1–2	Sporting	Belém
	Pedras 44'		Fernando Pinto 59'; Peres 116'	Stadium: Estádio do Restelo

28 September 1965	Rangers	3–1	Benfica	Glasgow
			Augusto	Stadium: Ibrox Stadium

7 October 1965 Turism Cup	Benfica	1–1	Eintracht Frankfurt	Lisbon
			Augusto	Stadium: Estádio da Luz

13 October 1965	FK Austria Wien	3–3	Benfica	Wien
			Torres; Eusébio; Augusto Silva	Stadium: Ernst Happel Stadion

24 October 1965	Barreirense	3–8	Benfica	Barreiro
			Pedras	Stadium: Estádio Alfredo da Silva

== Player statistics ==
The squad for the season consisted of the players listed in the tables below, as well as staff member Fernando Riera (manager), Fernando Cabrita (assistant manager).

Note 1: Note: Flags indicate national team as defined under FIFA eligibility rules. Players may hold more than one non-FIFA nationality.

Note 2: Players with squad numbers marked ‡ joined the club during the 1965–66 season via transfer, with more details in the following section.

No.	Pos	Nat	Player	Total		Primeira Divisão		Taça de Portugal		European Cup	
No.	Pos	Nat	Player	Apps	Goals	Apps	Goals	Apps	Goals	Apps	Goals
1	GK	(Portugal) POR	Costa Pereira	21	0	17	0	2	0	2	0
1	GK	(Portugal) POR	José Melo	14	0	7	0	3	0	4	0
1	GK	(Portugal) POR	Alfredo Nascimento	4	0	2	0	2	0	0	0
	DF	(Portugal) POR	Fernando Severino	1	0	0	0	1	0	0	0
	DF	(Portugal) POR	Rui Loio	1	0	0	0	1	0	0	0
	DF	(Portugal) POR	Augusto Silva	27	0	17	0	5	0	5	0
	DF	(Portugal) POR	Luciano	0	0	0	0	0	0	0	0
	DF	(Portugal) POR	Jacinto	16	2	7	0	6	2	3	0
2	DF	(Portugal) POR	Domiciano Cavém	28	0	21	0	5	0	2	0
3	DF	(Portugal) POR	Fernando Cruz	31	0	23	0	4	0	4	0
3	DF	(Portugal) POR	Raul Machado	20	0	14	0	2	0	4	0
4	DF	(Portugal) POR	Germano	23	0	17	0	1	0	5	0
	MF	(Portugal) POR	Jorge Calado	3	0	2	0	0	0	1	0
	MF	(Portugal) POR	Nélson Fernandes	17	9	12	4	5	5	0	0
	MF	(Portugal) POR	Pedras	10	5	5	2	3	0	2	3
	MF	(Portugal) POR	José Neto	6	0	3	0	1	0	2	0
	MF	(Portugal) POR	Humberto Fernandes	3	0	1	0	2	0	0	0
	MF	(Portugal) POR	Félix Guerreiro	4	2	2	1	0	0	2	1
5	MF	(Portugal) POR	José Ferreira Pinto	17	1	13	0	1	0	3	1
6	MF	(Portugal) POR	Mário Coluna	31	4	22	3	4	0	5	1
7	FW	(Portugal) POR	José Augusto	32	14	24	10	3	0	5	4
8	FW	(Portugal) POR	Santana	3	1	0	0	2	0	1	1
9	FW	(Portugal) POR	José Torres	30	22	23	18	2	1	5	3
9	FW	(Portugal) POR	Yaúca	8	6	3	1	4	3	1	2
10	FW	(Portugal) POR	Eusébio	30	37	23	25	2	5	5	7
11	FW	(Portugal) POR	António Simões	29	7	24	7	1	0	4	0
11	FW	(Portugal) POR	Serafim	10	1	6	0	3	0	1	1
