= 1968 European Cup Winners' Cup final =

- Match programme cover
- Event: 1967–68 European Cup Winners' Cup
| Hamburger SV | Milan |
| (West Germany) | (Italy) |
| 0 | 2 |
- Date: 23 May 1968
- Venue: Feijenoord Stadion, Rotterdam
- Referee: José María Ortiz de Mendíbil (Spain)
- Attendance: 53,000

The 1968 European Cup Winners' Cup Final was the final football match of the 1967–68 European Cup Winners' Cup and the eighth European Cup Winners' Cup final. It was contested between Hamburg of West Germany and Milan of Italy, and was held at Feijenoord Stadion in Rotterdam, Netherlands. Milan won the match 2–0 thanks to two goals by Kurt Hamrin.

== Route to the final ==
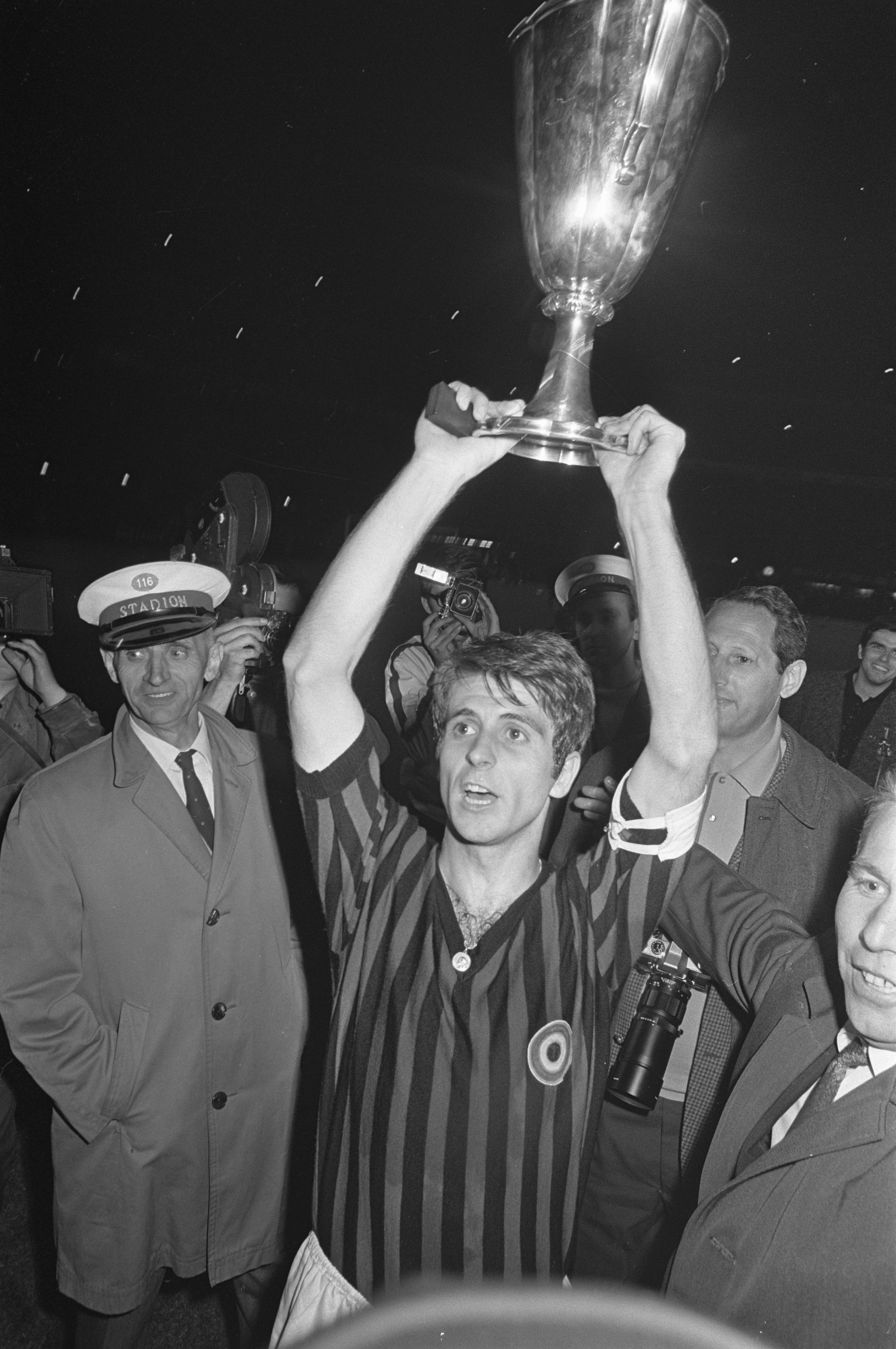
Gianni Rivera holding the cup

| (West Germany) Hamburg | | | | | | (Italy) Milan | | | | |
|---|---|---|---|---|---|---|---|---|---|---|
| Opponent | Agg. | 1st leg | 2nd leg | Replay | | Opponent | Agg. | 1st leg | 2nd leg | Replay |
| 7–3 | 5–3 (H) | 2–0 (A) | N/A | First round | (Denmark) Randers Freja | (Bulgaria) Levski Sofia | 6–2 | 5–1 (H) | 1–1 (A) | N/A |
| (Poland) Wisła Kraków | 5–0 | 1–0 (A) | 4–0 (H) | N/A | Second round | (Hungary) Rába ETO Győr | 3–3 (a) | 2–2 (A) | 1–1 (H) | N/A |
| (France) Lyon | 2–2 (r) | 2–0 (H) | 0–2 (aet) (A) | 2–0 | Quarter-finals | (Belgium) Standard Liège | 2–2 (r) | 1–1 (A) | 1–1 (aet) (H) | 2–0 |
| (Wales) Cardiff City | 4–3 | 1–1 (H) | 3–2 (A) | N/A | Semi-finals | (West Germany) Bayern Munich | 2–0 | 2–0 (H) | 0–0 (A) | N/A |

== Match ==
=== Details ===
23 May 1968
19:00

| Hamburger SV (West Germany) | 0–2 | (Italy) Milan |
|---|---|---|
| | Report | Hamrin 3', 19' |

Feijenoord Stadion, Rotterdam
Attendance: 53,276
Referee: José María Ortiz de Mendíbil (Spain)

| Hamburg | Milan |

| GK | 1 | (Turkey) Özcan Arkoç |
| DF | 2 | (West Germany) Helmut Sandmann |
| DF | 6 | (West Germany) Willi Schulz |
| DF | 5 | (West Germany) Egon Horst |
| DF | 3 | (West Germany) Jürgen Kurbjuhn |
| MF | 4 | (West Germany) Holger Dieckmann |
| MF | 8 | (West Germany) Werner Krämer |
| FW | 7 | (West Germany) Bernd Dörfel |
| FW | 9 | (West Germany) Uwe Seeler (c) |
| FW | 10 | (West Germany) Franz-Josef Hönig |
| FW | 11 | (West Germany) Charly Dörfel |
Manager:
(West Germany) Kurt Koch

| GK | 1 | (Italy) Fabio Cudicini |
| DF | 2 | (Italy) Angelo Anquilletti |
| DF | 3 | (West Germany) Karl-Heinz Schnellinger |
| DF | 5 | (Italy) Roberto Rosato |
| DF | 6 | (Italy) Nevio Scala |
| MF | 4 | (Italy) Giovanni Trapattoni |
| MF | 8 | (Italy) Giovanni Lodetti |
| FW | 7 | (Sweden) Kurt Hamrin |
| FW | 9 | (Italy) Angelo Sormani |
| FW | 10 | (Italy) Gianni Rivera (c) |
| FW | 11 | (Italy) Pierino Prati |
Manager:
(Italy) Nereo Rocco

== See also ==
- 1968 European Cup Final
- 1968 Inter-Cities Fairs Cup Final
- A.C. Milan in European football
