= Egon Horst =

German footballer (1938–2015)

Personal information
- Date of birth: 25 November 1938
- Place of birth: Aschaffenburg, Germany
- Date of death: 16 February 2015 (aged 76)
- Height: 1.86 m (6 ft 1 in)
- Position: Defender

Senior career*
Years	Team	Apps	(Gls)
1960–1965	FC Schalke 04	124	(2)
1965–1969	Hamburger SV	119	(0)
- * Club domestic league appearances and goals

Egon Horst (25 November 1938 – 14 February 2015) was a German football player. He spent six seasons in the Bundesliga with FC Schalke 04 and Hamburger SV.

== Honours ==
- UEFA Cup Winners' Cup finalist: 1967–68
- DFB-Pokal finalist: 1966–67
