= Kurt Hamrin =

Swedish footballer (1934–2024)

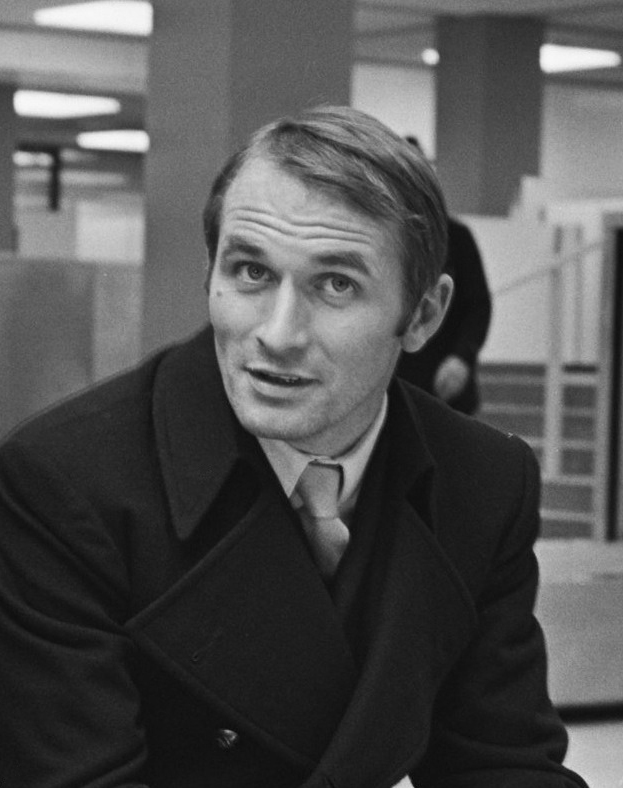
- Hamrin in 1970

Personal information
- Full name: Kurt Roland Hamrin
- Date of birth: 19 November 1934
- Place of birth: Stockholm, Sweden
- Date of death: 4 February 2024 (aged 89)
- Place of death: Florence, Italy
- Height: 1.70 m (5 ft 7 in)
- Position: Winger

Youth career
- 1946–1947: Huvudsta IS
- 1947–1948: Råsunda IS
- 1949–1951: AIK

Senior career*
| Years | Team | Apps | (Gls) |
| 1952–1955 | AIK | 62 | (54) |
| 1956–1957 | Juventus | 23 | (8) |
| 1957–1958 | Padova | 30 | (20) |
| 1958–1967 | Fiorentina | 289 | (150) |
| 1967–1969 | AC Milan | 36 | (9) |
| 1969–1971 | Napoli | 22 | (3) |
| 1971–1972 | IFK Stockholm | 10 | (5) |
| Total | | 472 | (249) |

International career
| 1953 | Sweden U21 | 1 | (1) |
| 1953–1965 | Sweden | 32 | (17) |
Medal record
Men's Football
Representing Sweden
FIFA World Cup
| Runner-up | 1958 Sweden |
- * Club domestic league appearances and goals

Kurt Roland "Kurre" Hamrin (Swedish: [ˈkɵʈː hamˈriːn]; 19 November 1934 – 4 February 2024) was a Swedish professional footballer who played as a winger. He began his career in his home country with AIK, but later played for several Italian clubs, most notably Fiorentina, with whom he won two Coppa Italia titles, a Cup Winners' Cup, and a Mitropa Cup over nine years, making over 350 appearances for the club and scoring over 200 goals in all competitions. He also represented AC Milan, with whom he won a Serie A title and the European Cup. A prolific goalscorer, he is the eighth highest goalscorer of all time in Italy's Serie A, with 190 goals.

In addition to his success at club level, Hamrin also had a successful international career, and was a member of the Sweden team that reached the 1958 FIFA World Cup final on home soil; he is commonly regarded as one of the greatest Swedish footballers of all time, as well as one of Fiorentina's greatest players ever.

== Club career ==
Hamrin first played for AIK in Sweden, whom he joined in the 1952–53 season. He then joined Italian side Juventus in 1956 and played 23 games during his single season there, notching eight goals. After that one season, he joined Padova on loan, where he scored 20 goals in 30 games. He would only stay there for one season again, as he was sold to Fiorentina in 1958, where he stayed until 1967, playing 289 Serie A games and scoring 150 goals. While at Fiorentina, he won the Coppa Italia in 1961 and 1966, as well as the 1960–61 European Cup Winners' Cup (finishing the competition as the top-scorer with six goals, including one in the second leg of the final, a 2–1 home victory over Rangers), and the 1966 Mitropa Cup. Hamrin is commonly regarded as one of Fiorentina's greatest ever players, and is the team's all-time highest goalscorer, with 208 goals. He joined AC Milan in 1967 and played there for two seasons, winning the league title in 1968; he also scored both goals for Milan as they overcame Hamburg 2–0 in the 1968 European Cup Winners' Cup final. The following season, the team won the European Cup. His final Italian club was Napoli, whom he joined from Milan in 1969. In 1971, he returned to Sweden, playing one season for IFK Stockholm before retiring in 1972.

== International career ==
Hamrin played 32 times for Sweden between 1953 and 1965, scoring 17 goals. Most Swedes remember him best for the goal he scored against West Germany in the semi-finals of the 1958 FIFA World Cup on home soil. The goal allowed Sweden to win the match 3–1, and secure a place in the final against Brazil, where they were defeated 5–2.

== After retirement and death ==
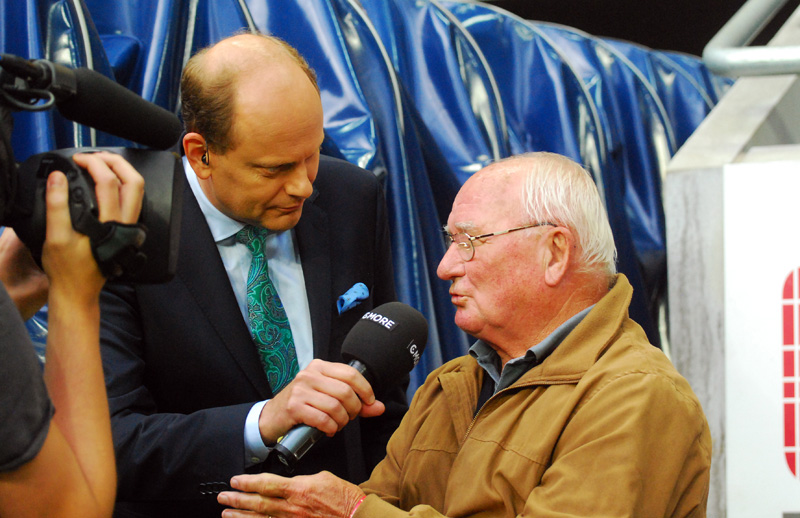
Hamrin being interviewed by Lasse Granqvist in July 2015

After his retirement as a footballer, Hamrin moved to Florence with his family. He also worked as scout for AC Milan from 1998 to 2008. Hamrin died on 4 February 2024, at the age of 89. He was the last surviving player from either the Swedish and Brazilian sides who participated in the 1958 World Cup final.

== Style of play ==
Hamrin was a fast and technically skilled right winger, noted for his prolific goalscoring. He was known for his dribbling, striking ability with either foot, and getting past his opponents; with speed, elaborate moves and feints, such as the nutmeg. He was also known to be injury-prone.

== Career statistics ==
=== International ===
Appearances and goals by national team and year
| National team | Year | Apps | Goals |
|---|---|---|---|
| Sweden | 1953 | 3 | 1 |
| Sweden | 1954 | 8 | 5 |
| Sweden | 1955 | 9 | 4 |
| Sweden | 1956 | 0 | 0 |
| Sweden | 1957 | 0 | 0 |
| Sweden | 1958 | 5 | 4 |
| Sweden | 1959 | 0 | 0 |
| Sweden | 1960 | 0 | 0 |
| Sweden | 1961 | 0 | 0 |
| Sweden | 1962 | 1 | 0 |
| Sweden | 1963 | 1 | 0 |
| Sweden | 1964 | 3 | 3 |
| Sweden | 1965 | 2 | 0 |
| Total | | 32 | 17 |

Scores and results list Sweden's goal tally first, score column indicates score after each Hamrin goal.

List of international goals scored by Kurt Hamrin
| No. | Date | Venue | Opponent | Score | Result | Competition | Ref. |
|---|---|---|---|---|---|---|---|
| 1 | 15 November 1953 | Nepstadion, Budapest, Hungary | Hungary | 2–2 | 2–2 | Friendly | |
| 2 | 4 June 1954 | Gamla Ullevi, Gothenburg, Sweden | Finland | 5–0 | 6–0 | Friendly | |
| 3 | 7 June 1954 | Råsunda Stadium, Solna, Sweden | Norway | 3–0 | 3–0 | Friendly | |
| 4 | 15 August 1954 | Helsinki Olympic Stadium, Helsinki, Finland | Finland | 1–0 | 10–1 | 1952–55 Nordic Football Championship | |
| 5 | 15 August 1954 | Helsinki Olympic Stadium, Helsinki, Finland | Finland | 9–1 | 10–1 | 1952–55 Nordic Football Championship | |
| 6 | 15 August 1954 | Helsinki Olympic Stadium, Helsinki, Finland | Finland | 10–1 | 10–1 | 1952–55 Nordic Football Championship | |
| 7 | 15 June 1955 | Gamla Ullevi, Gothenburg, Sweden | Romania | 2–0 | 4–1 | Friendly | |
| 8 | 15 June 1955 | Gamla Ullevi, Gothenburg, Sweden | Romania | 4–0 | 4–1 | Friendly | |
| 9 | 16 October 1955 | Parken Stadium, Copenhagen, Denmark | Denmark | 3–3 | 3–3 | 1952–55 Nordic Football Championship | |
| 10 | 20 November 1955 | Estadio Nacional, Lisbon, Portugal | Portugal | 1–0 | 6–2 | Friendly | |
| 11 | 12 June 1958 | Råsunda Stadium, Solna, Sweden | Hungary | 1–0 | 2–1 | 1958 FIFA World Cup | |
| 12 | 12 June 1958 | Råsunda Stadium, Solna, Sweden | Hungary | 2–0 | 2–1 | 1958 FIFA World Cup | |
| 13 | 19 June 1958 | Råsunda Stadium, Solna, Sweden | Soviet Union | 1–0 | 2–0 | 1958 FIFA World Cup | |
| 14 | 24 June 1958 | Ullevi, Gothenburg, Sweden | West Germany | 3–1 | 3–1 | 1958 FIFA World Cup | |
| 15 | 13 May 1964 | Råsunda Stadium, Solna, Sweden | Soviet Union | 1–1 | 1–1 | 1964 European Nations' Cup qualifying quarter-finals | |
| 16 | 27 May 1964 | Lenin Stadium, Moscow, Soviet Union | Soviet Union | 2–1 | 3–1 | 1964 European Nations' Cup qualifying quarter-finals | |
| 17 | 4 November 1964 | Olympiastadion, Berlin, Germany | West Germany | 1–1 | 1–1 | 1966 FIFA World Cup qualification | |

== Honours ==
Fiorentina

- European Cup Winners' Cup: 1960–61
- Mitropa Cup: 1966
- Coppa Italia: 1960–61, 1965–66

AC Milan

- European Cup: 1968–69
- European Cup Winners' Cup: 1967–68
- Serie A: 1967–68

Sweden

- FIFA World Cup runner-up: 1958

Individual

- Allsvenskan top scorer: 1954–55
- Serie A Team of The Year: 1958, 1959, 1960, 1962, 1964, 1966
- UEFA Cup Winners' Cup Top Scorer: 1960–61 (6 goals)
- FIFA XI: 1967
- Venerdì's 100 Magnifici
- UEFA President Award: 2014
- ACF Fiorentina Hall of Fame: 2012
- Fiorentina All-time XI
- Fiorentina All-time top scorer
