= Pedras =

Pedras may refer to:

- Pedras (footballer, born 1941), Portuguese footballer
- Pedras (footballer, born 1980), Portuguese footballer
