= Jürgen Kurbjuhn =

German footballer

Personal information
- Full name: Jürgen Kurbjuhn
- Date of birth: 26 July 1940
- Place of birth: Tilsit, Germany
- Date of death: 15 March 2014 (aged 73)
- Place of death: Buxtehude, Germany
- Height: 1.86 m (6 ft 1 in)
- Position: Fullback

Youth career
- Buxtehuder SV

Senior career*
Years	Team	Apps	(Gls)
1960–1963	Hamburger SV^{(OL Nord)}	76	(1)
1963–1972	Hamburger SV^{(BL)}	242	(10)
Total		318	(11)

International career
1962–1966	West Germany	5	(0)
- * Club domestic league appearances and goals

Jürgen Kurbjuhn (26 July 1940 – 15 March 2014) was a German football player. Kurbjuhn had excelled as a youth-international for West Germany during his time with amateur club Buxtehuder SV and joined Hamburg's biggest, Hamburger SV, in 1960 when the club had just been crowned German football champion. In 1961 he was part of the Hamburg side reaching the semi-final of the European Cup against Barcelona and part of the 1963 German Cup winning side of the club. He retired, because of injury, after ten goals in 242 Bundesliga matches in 1972, mostly as a left back.

His West Germany career lasted five matches, between April 1962 and May 1966. He was unused by Sepp Herberger at the 1962 FIFA World Cup. He played his last international on 4 May 1966, when the West Germans beat Ireland 4–0 in a friendly. He was not selected for Helmut Schön's squad for the 1966 FIFA World Cup.

From 1988 he owned an insurance company in Buxtehude.

== Honours ==
- UEFA Cup Winners' Cup finalist: 1967–68
- DFB-Pokal winner: 1963–63; finalist 1966–67
