= Helmut Sandmann =

German footballer

Personal information
- Date of birth: 21 December 1944 (age 81)
- Place of birth: Hamburg, Germany
- Height: 1.72 m (5 ft 8 in)
- Position: Defender

Youth career
- Wandsbeker FC

Senior career*
Years	Team	Apps	(Gls)
1963–1973	Hamburger SV	195	(2)
1973–1976	HSV Barmbek-Uhlenhorst		
- * Club domestic league appearances and goals

Helmut Sandmann (born 21 December 1944) is a retired German football player. He spent 10 seasons in the Bundesliga with Hamburger SV.

== Honours ==
- UEFA Cup Winners' Cup finalist: 1967–68
- DFB-Pokal finalist: 1966–67
