= Ferreira Pinto =

Ferreira Pinto may refer to:

- Ferreira Pinto (footballer, born 1939), Portuguese footballer
- Ferreira Pinto (footballer, born 1979), Brazilian footballer
