= List of ACF Fiorentina records and statistics =

ACF Fiorentina is an Italian football team based in Florence, founded in 1926. The list encompasses the major honours won by Fiorentina and the records set by the players and the club.

== Honours ==
=== National titles ===
Serie A:

- Winners (2) : 1955–56; 1968–69
- Runners-up (5): 1956–57; 1957–58; 1958–59; 1959–60; 1981–82

Coppa Italia:

- Winners (6) : 1939–40; 1960–61; 1965–66; 1974–75; 1995–96; 2000–01
- Runners-up (5): 1958, 1959–60, 1998–99, 2013–14, 2022–23

Supercoppa Italiana:

- Winners (1) : 1996
- Runners-up (1): 2001

=== European titles ===
European Cup:

- Runners-up (1): 1956–57

UEFA Cup Winners' Cup:

- Winners (1) : 1960–61
- Runners-up (1): 1961–62

UEFA Cup:

- Runners-up (1): 1989–90

UEFA Conference League:

- Runners-up (2): 2022–23, 2023–24

=== Minor titles ===
Coppa Grasshoppers

- Winners (1) : 1957

Mitropa Cup

- Winners (1) : 1966

Anglo-Italian League Cup

- Winners (1) : 1975

Serie B

- Winners: 1930–31; 1938–39; 1993–94

Serie C2 (as Florentia Viola)

- Winners: 2002–03

== Serie A record by opponent ==
Following is a table detailing ACF Fiorentina's record against each opponent in Serie A. It includes only results from seasons disputed in a single group round robin format. The data is updated to the end of the 2014-15 season.

Opponent	P	HW	HD	HL	AW	AD	AL	W	D	L	GS	GC
Alessandria	22	7	3	1	2	2	7	9	5	8	35	22
Ancona	2	1	0	0	0	0	1	1	0	1	8	3
Ascoli	32	11	4	1	4	4	8	15	8	9	39	26
Atalanta	104	33	12	7	13	20	19	46	32	26	153	91
Avellino	20	10	0	0	3	4	3	13	4	3	28	14
Bari	58	20	8	1	3	11	15	23	19	16	73	53
Bologna	126	34	16	13	14	24	25	48	40	38	159	133
Brescia	36	14	2	2	5	9	4	19	11	6	62	37
Cagliari	70	25	6	4	4	15	16	29	21	20	91	67
Casale	6	2	1	0	0	1	2	2	2	2	13	9
Catania	34	12	5	0	9	3	5	21	8	5	57	18
Catanzaro	14	4	3	0	5	2	0	9	5	0	21	5
Cesena	26	10	3	0	4	7	2	14	10	2	49	20
Chievo	22	8	0	3	7	2	2	15	2	5	33	19
Como	24	7	2	3	2	4	6	9	6	9	29	23
Cremonese	10	2	3	0	2	3	0	4	6	0	14	8
Empoli	16	4	3	1	4	3	1	8	6	2	24	12
Foggia	20	4	3	3	2	5	3	6	8	6	32	24
Genoa	88	29	12	3	13	18	13	42	30	16	153	105
Hellas Verona	2	1	0	0	0	0	1	1	1	1	2	2
Internazionale	154	27	32	18	14	18	45	41	50	63	191	230
Juventus	152	26	30	20	6	20	50	32	50	70	164	247
Lazio	132	31	19	16	13	21	32	44	40	48	164	175
Lecce	26	7	3	3	2	6	5	9	9	8	36	24
Lecco	6	3	0	0	2	0	1	5	0	1	15	3
Legnano	4	2	0	0	1	0	1	3	0	1	7	2
Liguria	8	4	0	0	0	3	1	4	3	1	21	9
Livorno	30	10	3	2	4	4	7	14	7	9	44	41
Lucchese	14	5	2	0	2	2	3	7	4	3	18	12
Mantova	14	4	1	2	3	4	0	7	5	2	18	5
Messina	10	2	2	1	2	3	0	4	5	1	19	8
Milan	150	30	21	24	11	20	44	41	41	68	177	235
Modena	16	4	2	2	2	3	3	6	5	5	29	22
Napoli	130	35	15	15	16	20	29	51	35	44	163	134
Novara	24	8	4	0	3	2	7	11	6	7	37	28
Padova	30	13	2	0	5	6	4	18	8	4	60	29
Palermo	54	19	2	6	12	7	8	31	9	14	78	46
Parma	42	11	5	5	4	10	7	15	15	12	58	50
Perugia	22	7	2	2	2	5	4	9	7	6	33	26
Pescara	12	5	0	1	4	2	0	9	2	1	26	8
Piacenza	12	3	2	1	1	2	3	4	4	4	13	18
Pisa	14	4	3	0	3	3	1	7	6	1	22	7
Pistoiese	2	0	0	1	1	0	0	1	0	1	2	2
Pro Patria	20	9	1	0	3	4	3	12	5	3	37	18
Pro Vercelli	8	3	1	0	0	0	4	3	1	4	7	12
Reggiana	4	1	1	0	0	2	0	1	3	0	5	2
Reggina	14	7	0	0	1	6	0	8	6	0	26	11
Roma	152	32	31	13	14	27	35	46	58	48	186	187
Salernitana	4	2	0	0	0	1	1	2	1	1	6	3
Sampdoria	112	29	19	8	11	21	24	40	40	32	147	126
Sampierdarenese	6	1	2	0	1	1	1	2	3	1	5	4
Sassuolo	4	0	1	1	2	0	0	2	1	1	7	5
Siena	16	6	2	0	3	2	3	9	4	3	23	9
SPAL	32	9	5	2	5	6	5	14	11	7	40	27
Ternana	4	2	0	0	2	0	0	4	0	0	6	1
Torino	132	30	27	9	12	18	36	42	45	45	166	168
Treviso	2	1	0	0	1	0	0	2	0	0	4	1
Triestina	46	19	3	1	4	8	11	23	11	12	73	60
Udinese	78	24	10	5	11	14	14	35	24	19	133	95
Varese	14	6	1	0	0	7	0	6	8	0	21	9
Venezia	24	9	1	2	4	1	7	13	2	9	47	35
Verona	50	14	7	4	10	8	7	24	15	11	75	55
Vicenza	60	15	8	7	10	7	13	25	15	20	76	66

== Player records ==
=== Appearances ===
Only including appearances in competitive matches, including substitutes.

==== Most appearances in all competitions ====
Rank	Player	Appearances
1	(Italy) Giancarlo Antognoni	429
2	(Italy) Giuseppe Brizi	389
3	(Italy) Claudio Merlo	377
4	(Sweden) Kurt Hamrin	362
5	(Italy) Manuel Pasqual	356
6	(Italy) Giancarlo De Sisti	348
7	(Italy) Giuseppe Chiappella	345
8	(Italy) Francesco Toldo	337
9	(Italy) Sergio Cervato	334
10	(Argentina) Gabriel Batistuta	332

==== Most appearances in Serie A ====
Rank	Player	Appearances in Serie A
1	(Italy) Giancarlo Antognoni	340
2	(Italy) Giuseppe Chiappella	329
3	(Italy) Sergio Cervato	317
4	(Italy) Manuel Pasqual	302
5	(Sweden) Kurt Hamrin	289

=== Goalscorers ===
Only including goals scored in competitive matches, including substitutes.

==== Top goalscorers in all official competitions ====
Rank	Player	Goals
1	(Sweden) Kurt Hamrin	208
1	(Argentina) Gabriel Batistuta	208
2	(Italy) (Argentina) Miguel Montuori	84
3	(Italy) Giancarlo Antognoni	72
4	(Romania) Adrian Mutu	70
5	(Italy) Alberto Galassi	63
5	(Italy) Alberto Gilardino	63
6	(Italy) Giuseppe Virgili	62
6	(Italy) Christian Riganò	62
7	(Italy) Luca Toni	57
7	(Italy) Gianfranco Petris	57

=== Top goalscorers in Serie A ===
Rank	Player	Goals
1	(Argentina) Gabriel Batistuta	152
2	(Sweden) Kurt Hamrin	148
3	(Italy) (Argentina) Miguel Montuori	71
4	(Italy) Alberto Galassi	61
4	(Italy) Giancarlo Antognoni	61

== Club records ==
- Biggest home win:
  - 8–0 v Modena (1941–42)
- Biggest home defeat:
  - 0–5 v Juventus (2011–12)
- Biggest away win:
  - 7–1 v Atalanta (1963–64)
- Biggest away defeat:
  - 0–8 v Juventus (1952–53)
- Most points in a season:
  - 70 (2012–13)
- Fewest points in a season:
  - 15 (1937–38)
- Most wins in a season:
  - 22 (2005–06)
- Fewest wins in a season:
  - 3 (1937–38 & 1970–71)
- Most defeats in a season:
  - 22 (2001–02)
- Fewest defeats in a season:
  - 1 (1955–56 & 1968–69)
- Most goals in a season:
  - 95 (1958–59)
- Fewest goals in a season:
  - 26 (1970–71 & 1978–79)
- Most goals conceded in a season:
  - 69 (1946–47)
- Fewest goals conceded in a season:
  - 17 (1981–82)
- First Italian club to play in a European Cup final, in the 1956–57 European Cup.
- First Italian club to win an official UEFA competition, in the 1960–61 European Cup Winners' Cup.
