= José Pinto =

José Pinto may refer to:

- José Pinto (rugby union) (born 1981), Portuguese rugby union player
- José Pinto (race walker) (born 1956), Portuguese retired race walker
- José Manuel Pinto (born 1975), Spanish football goalkeeper
- Ferreira Pinto (footballer, born 1939), former Portuguese footballer
- Zezinho (footballer, born March 1992), full name José Luis dos Santos Pinto, Brazilian footballer
- José Carlos Pinto (born 1993), Guatemalan footballer
- José Pinto (Honduran footballer) (born 1997), Honduran footballer
