= Danny Trainor =

Northern Irish footballer (1944-1974)

Personal information
- Full name: Daniel Trainor
- Date of birth: 12 July 1944
- Place of birth: Belfast, Northern Ireland
- Date of death: 10 August 1974 (aged 30)
- Place of death: Ballymoney, Northern Ireland
- Position: Forward

Senior career*
Years	Team	Apps	(Gls)
1961–1962	Distillery	0	(0)
1962–1963	Coleraine	?	(?)
1963–1968	Crusaders	?	(34)
1967	Detroit Cougars (guest)	7	(2)
1968	Plymouth Argyle	17	(3)
1968–1969	Waterford	?	(12)
1969–1970	St. Patrick's Athletic	?	(3)
1970–1971	Crusaders	?	(0)
1971–1973	Bangor	?	(?)
1973–1974	Drogheda United	?	(2)

International career
1965–1967	Northern Ireland Amateur	2	(0)
1967	Northern Ireland U23	1	(0)
1967	Northern Ireland	1	(0)
- * Club domestic league appearances and goals

Danny Trainor (12 July 1944 – 10 August 1974) was a Northern Irish international footballer.

== Club career ==
Trainor's early career had seen spells with Lisburn Distillery and Coleraine before he joined Crusaders as a wing-half. It was in that role that he played in a 6–0 County Antrim Shield win over Larne in 1965. That same season he also played in the Gold Cup Final – a match lost 5–2 to Derry City.

In 1967–68, Trainor scored over thirty goals, including the strike in the 1967–68 Irish Cup final revenge over Glentoran.

Trainor guested for the Detroit Cougars in 1967. He had a goal controversially ruled out as off-side late on in the opening match, a 1–1 draw with Boston Shamrock Rovers. In the second match Trainor did score after just two minutes of a match against Sunderland (playing as Vancouver Royal Canadians) as the Cougars claimed another highly credible 1–1 draw. His only other goal of the tour was in a 6–1 humiliation by ADO Den Haag (aka San Francisco Golden Gate Gales) who included future Rangers manager Dick Advocaat among their goalscorers. Finally, Trainor's tour was brought to a premature close as he was sent-off for fighting during a 0–0 draw with Stoke City (playing as Cleveland Stokers).

A season back in the Irish League brought Trainor a second Irish Cup success as Crusaders, again the underdogs, shocked favourites Linfield with a 2–0 victory in the final at The Oval. With that, Trainor left Seaview behind, moving to English Third Division side, Plymouth Argyle. He never really settled in English football, the goalscoring touch that had made him such a threat in the Irish League deserting him as he scored just three times for the Pilgrims.

After just a few months in England Trainor returned across the Irish Sea, signing for the then dominant side in the League of Ireland, Waterford. In December 1968 he made a scoring debut, the first of twelve league goals that season, as Waterford claimed the title. He later played with St Pat's Athletic and Drogheda United. Although he was not retained by Drogheda at the end of the 1973/74 season, Trainor was travelling with some of his ex-clubmates from a pre-season training camp in the first week of August 1974 when they were involved in a head-on collision. Trainor was killed instantly and the two occupants of the other car, a husband and wife, also died.

== International career ==
Having been capped at Amateur level, Bertie Peacock included Trainor in the Northern Ireland Under-23 team for a match against Wales in February 1967. Although bad weather forced the match to be abandoned with the score 2–1 in the favour of the Irish, Trainor had done enough to convince Peacock that he was a suitable deputy for Johnny Crossan in the full Northern Ireland set-up. Consequently, with Crossan ruled out, Trainor won his only Full cap in a 0–0 draw with Wales at Windsor Park in April 1967. He was joined in the line-up by future-Cougar teammates Walter Bruce and Arthur Stewart.

== Honours ==
Crusaders

- Irish Cup (2): 1966–67, 1967–68
- County Antrim Shield (1): 1964–65

Waterford

- League of Ireland (1): 1968–69
