= Kurt Koch (football manager) =

German football manager

Kurt Koch (2 November 1919 – 9 November 2000) was a German football manager.

He trained the Regionalliga clubs VfB Oldenburg from 1960 to 1965 and Altona 93 in the 1966–67 season. In the seasons 1967–68 and 1968–69 he coached Bundesliga club Hamburger SV, where his greatest success was reaching the 1968 UEFA Cup Winners' Cup Final. In 1971–72 he coached FC Schweinfurt 05.
