= Lasse Granqvist =

Swedish sports journalist

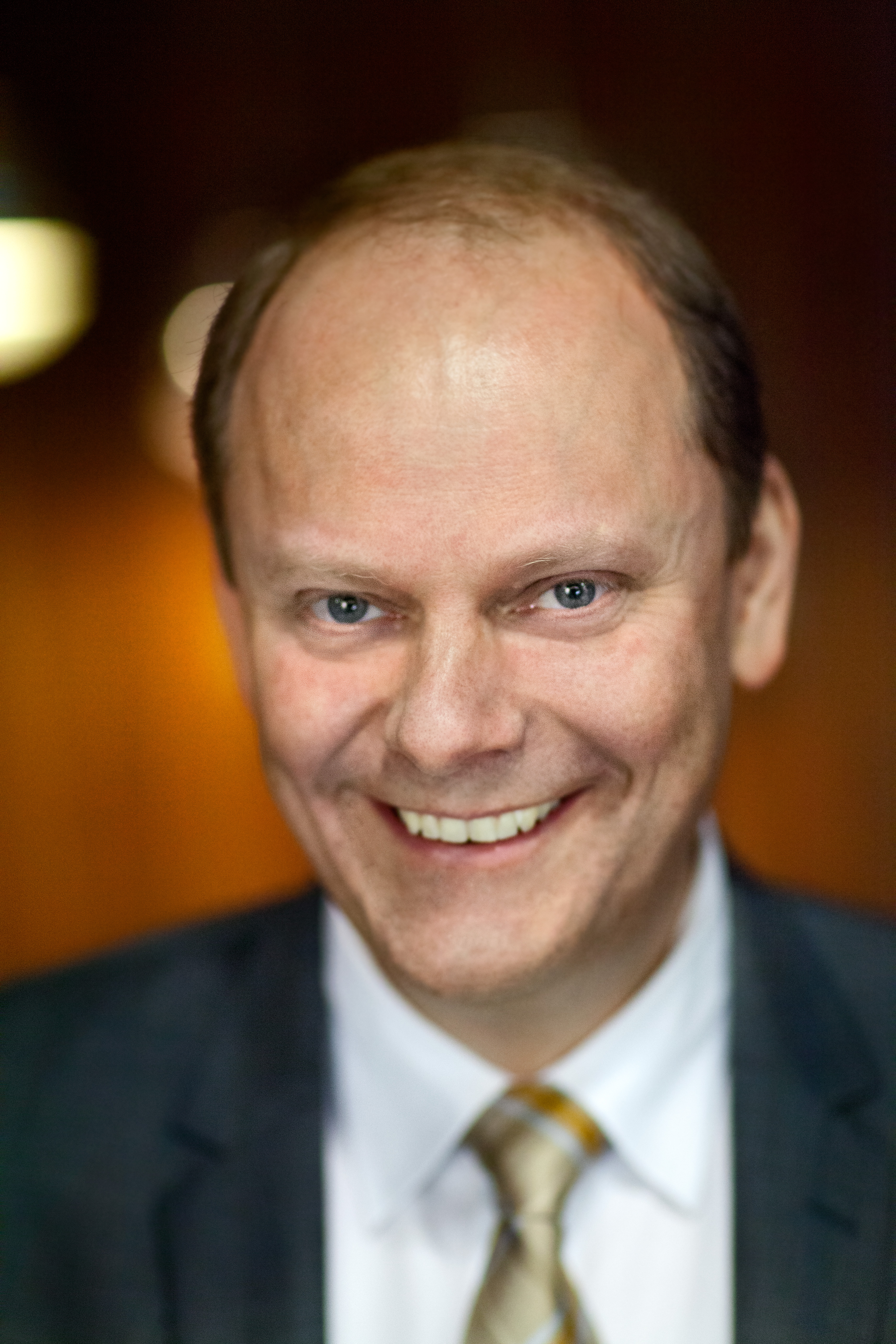
- Lasse Granqvist in 2013.
- Born: Lars Ivar Granqvist; 25 October 1967 (age 58); Solna, Sweden
- Occupations: Sports journalist, businessman

Lars Ivar "Lasse" Granqvist (born 25 October 1967) is a Swedish sports journalist. He was active for Sveriges Radio between August 1987 and 15 January 2013 commentating football with expert commentator Ralf Edström and ice hockey with expert commentator Lars-Gunnar Jansson. He is famous for his quick commentary and the clarity of his voice. Granqvist has been active for C More Entertainment since 1 January 2000.

== Early life ==
Granqvist was born at Karolinska Hospital in Solna on 25 October 1967 and grew up on Backvägen in Solna. His father, Karl-Ivar, co-created "The Bench" – a place at Solna Centrum shopping mall where men gathered to hang out while their wives were shopping. Since it was forbidden to talk about politics and religion, much talk on "The Bench" came to be about sports. As young, Granqvist was bad at sports and not much of an athlete. When he was six to seven years old, his father sent him to a football practice at Råstasjön's sports ground. It rained and they lined up in a row and the coach threw balls so they could practise headers. Granqvist struck the ball once and it hurt badly. Then he went home. And in ice hockey he could only stop on ice skate in one direction and as a result he always ended up in the snow bank. Instead, he acted as a referee and was commenting the games at the same time. He did though make 38 points in 50 games whilst playing floorball in Division 1 for IBK Solna. As a child in Solna, Granqvist used to sit with big headphones and listen to Sportextra sports show in Sveriges Radio P4. At the same time he made own notes. With different color pencils he recorded goals, penalties and other important events in the ice hockey matches. When there were no matches, he and a friend made up own onces. There was no doubt that Granqvist would become a sports commentator in radio. Ten years old, in the car on the way to and from the summer house, the Granqvist family passed Uppsala's then ten traffic lights while Lasse referred a race against the traffic signals. When the kids in the yard had a cycling competition, Granqvist used to jump on a table in the sandbox and comment on the race even though he did not see the cyclists. As they approached, he got put together a summary. When Granqvist went out with a car with his mom and dad, he commented on the competition between red and blue cars.

In school, Granqvist was in a somewhat odd trio called "Jönssonligan". They competed in getting the best results on examinations, wore their books in plastic bags, and did not go down to the school lockers between classes. In this way he managed to study even a little more. Granqvist's main feature was language-related. He could hear what was correct. Other information he just pushed into his head. He could texts by heart, entire books. But then when the examination was done everything was gone. To this day, he has the benefit of that in the job because he finds it easy to learn lineups. During the last year at high school, he called Sveriges Radio and asked what was required of him to work there. Journalist College, was the reply by Björn Fagerlind, the editorial secretary at the time. Granqvist studied hard and got 4.9 out of 5 in the final grade. It was not enough but he enrolled later. The third and final semester at the Journalist College at Stockholm University meant internship. Granqvist was the only one who wanted to Radiosporten, the sport section of Sveriges Radio. Another person appeared who also wanted to Radiosporten and there was only one internship. It became a lottery and Granqvist won the draw.

== Career ==
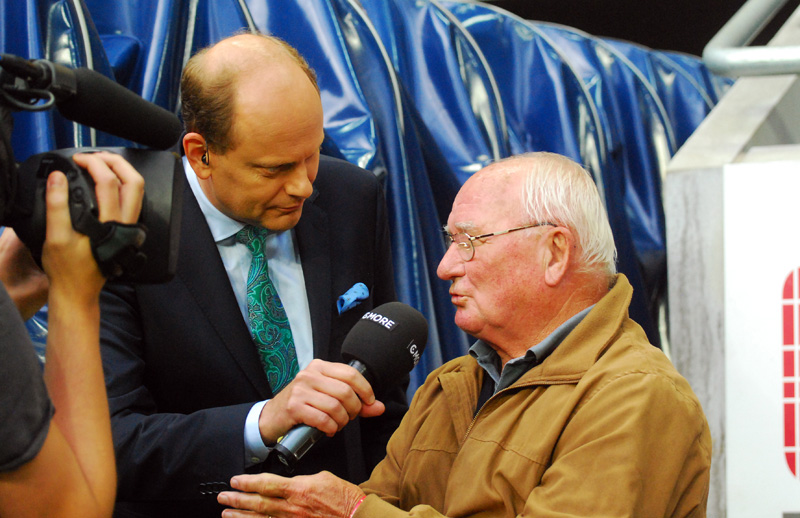
Granqvist with Kurt Hamrin in 2015.

On 16 January 1988, Granqvist joined Radiosporten. After completing his internship in May 1988, he received a summer temp job, followed by an Olympic Games temp job, followed by a winter temp job, and so on until he was employed on 1 May 1989. Granqvist role model as a commentator was Lasse Kinch. He also learned a lot of Tommy Engstrand's passion and the directness of Åke Strömmer. Commentators like Robert Perlskog and Lasse Kinch had gone on to other jobs so an opening appeared for Granqvist. Lasse Kinch left Radiosporten in 1990. The last thing he did was Sweden-West Germany at Råsunda. Granqvist stood down at the sidelines and interviewed. He had, however, before 1991 also commented a major international game. For example Sweden-Wales at Råsunda in 1990, the penultimate match before the World Cup in Italy. The 1991 Men's World Ice Hockey Championships became Granqvist's major breakthrough. When Radiosporten said Granqvist would go, he felt strange because at that time there was a clear hierarchy at Radiosporten. You would have worked a long time to get the really big stuff. But Granqvist traveled to Finland and Sweden became world champion after Mats Sundin scored the last goal against Andrei Trefilov. Granqvist and expert commentator Lars-Gunnar Jansson commented and the Finnish sound engineer Jussi offered champagne. Granqvist was head of Radiosporten from 1998 to 1999 and permanent employed by the same until 31 December 1999. He had his own company since 1 January 2000 and had a running contract with Radiosporten until 31 December 2010 and also Canal+.

Lasse Granqvist was reported to the Swedish Broadcasting Authority for his commentating of the Sweden-Belarus game in the 2002 Winter Olympics. All complaints were later rejected. Granqvist is famous for his quick commentary and the clarity of his voice. During a match between Sweden and Finland in the 2003 Men's World Ice Hockey Championships, he pronounced 118 words in 23 seconds. When Sportextra celebrated its 50th anniversary in 2011 with a vote on the best sports quotes of all time, four of Granqvist's quotes was voted among the top seven. Granqvist worked 25 years at Radiosporten – and 13 parallel years with both radio and television – before leaving the radio to work on television when he switched to C More Entertainment and TV4. As of 2017, Granqvist has commentated 5 FIFA World Cups, 6 UEFA European Championships, 20 Ice Hockey World Championships, 6 Summer Olympic Games, 6 Winter Olympic Games and at least 120 international football fixtures.

== Personal life ==
Granqvist is chairman of the Swedish Sports Academy Nomination Jury and member number 84 of the Swedish Sports Academy.

Granqvist is a fan of AIK Fotboll and lives in Gustavsberg outside Stockholm.

== Awards ==
- Lennart Hyland's Special Prize (1994)
- Ikaro Prize, with Ralf Edström (1994)
- Sveriges Radio's Language Prize (1999)
- Sports journalist of the year in Stockholm (2003)
- Stora Retorikpriset ("Great Rhetoric Prize") (2006)
- SvenskaFans.com Golden Shield in different categories (2008–2011)
- Radio Academy's Honorary Prize (2012)
- Lukas Bonnier's Grand Prize for Journalism (2013)
