= 1966–67 Irish Cup =

Tournament details
- Country: Northern Ireland
- Teams: 16

Final positions
- Champions: Crusaders (1st win)
- Runners-up: Glentoran

Tournament statistics
- Matches played: 18
- Goals scored: 55 (3.06 per match)

The 1966–67 Irish Cup was the 87th edition of the Irish Cup, the premier knock-out cup competition in Northern Irish football.

Crusaders won the cup for the 1st time, defeating the holders Glentoran 3–1 in the final at Windsor Park.

== Results ==
=== First round ===
Team 1	Score	Team 2
Ards	0–2	Coleraine
Bangor	2–1	Glenavon
Brantwood	1–3	Portadown
Crusaders	1–0	Dundela
Distillery	3–0	Ballymena United
Glentoran	1–1	Derry City
Linfield	2–0	Ballyclare Comrades
Newry Town	1–1	Cliftonville

==== Replay ====
Team 1	Score	Team 2
Cliftonville	3–2	Newry Town
Derry City	1–1	Glentoran

==== Second replay ====
Team 1	Score	Team 2
Glentoran	1–0	Derry City

=== Quarter-finals ===
Team 1	Score	Team 2
Bangor	4–1	Portadown
Cliftonville	1–4	Linfield
Crusaders	1–0	Coleraine
Glentoran	3–1	Distillery

=== Semi-finals ===
Team 1	Score	Team 2
Crusaders	3–2	Bangor
Glentoran	1–0	Linfield

=== Final ===
22 April 1967

Crusaders	3–1	Glentoran
Trainor 3'; McNeill 26'; McCullough 49'	Report	Thompson 64'

Windsor Park, Belfast
Attendance: 20,000
Referee: J. Butler (Sunderland)
