= 1967–68 Irish Cup =

Tournament details
- Country: Northern Ireland
- Teams: 16

Final positions
- Champions: Crusaders (2nd win)
- Runners-up: Linfield

Tournament statistics
- Matches played: 20
- Goals scored: 63 (3.15 per match)

The 1967–68 Irish Cup was the 88th edition of the Irish Cup, the premier knock-out cup competition in Northern Irish football.

Crusaders won the cup for the 2nd time and the 2nd consecutive year, defeating Linfield 2–0 in the final at The Oval.

== Results ==
=== First round ===
Team 1	Score	Team 2
Ards	4–1	Coleraine
Ballyclare Comrades	1–0	Brantwood
Cliftonville	0–3	Bangor
Crusaders	1–0	Ballymena United
Glentoran	3–1	Glenavon
Larne	0–1	Derry City
Linfield	5–3	Banbridge Town
Portadown	2–0	Distillery

=== Quarter-finals ===
Team 1	Score	Team 2
Ballyclare Comrades	0–1	Ards
Bangor	0–5	Linfield
Crusaders	0–0	Portadown
Glentoran	2–2	Derry City

==== Replay ====
Team 1	Score	Team 2
Derry City	2–2	Glentoran
Portadown	2–2	Crusaders

==== Second replay ====
Team 1	Score	Team 2
Crusaders	4–3	Portadown
Derry City	1–0	Glentoran

=== Semi-finals ===
Team 1	Score	Team 2
Crusaders	1–1	Derry City
Linfield	2–1	Ards

==== Replay ====
Team 1	Score	Team 2
Crusaders	3–2	Derry City

=== Final ===
27 April 1968

Crusaders	2–0	Linfield
Meldrum 26', 68'	Report

The Oval, Belfast
Attendance: 18,000
Referee: K. E. Walker (Maidstone)
