= Andrzej Sykta =

Polish footballer (1940–2024)

Personal information
- Date of birth: 9 November 1940
- Place of birth: Kraków, General Government
- Date of death: 14 November 2024 (aged 84)
- Height: 1.68 m (5 ft 6 in)
- Position: Forward

Senior career*
Years	Team	Apps	(Gls)
–1959	Nadwiślan Kraków		
1959–1968	Wisła Kraków	216	(46)
1968–1971	Motor Lublin		
1972	Wisłoka Dębica		
1972–1973	Cambrai		
1973–1974	Créteil		

International career
1959–1962	Poland	2	(1)
- * Club domestic league appearances and goals

Andrzej Sykta (9 September 1940 – 14 November 2024) was a Polish footballer who played as a forward. He made two appearances for the Poland national team from 1959 to 1962. He made his debut in 1959 against Finland having played just 13 top flight games for Wisła Kraków and scored in a 6-2 win. He won the Polish Cup with Wisła Kraków in 1967. He ended his career in the French lower leagues, playing for AC Cambrai and US Créteil-Lusitanos.

Sykta died on 14 November 2024, at the age of 84.

== Honours ==
Wisła Kraków

- II liga: 1964–65
- Polish Cup: 1966–67
