= 1965–66 Taça de Portugal =

Tournament details
- Country: Portugal
- Dates: 6 November 1965 – 22 May 1966

Final positions
- Champions: Braga (1st title)
- Runners-up: Vitória de Setúbal

Tournament statistics
- Matches played: 63
- Top goal scorer(s): Carlos Manuel (11 goals)

The 1965–66 Taça de Portugal was the 26th edition of the Portuguese football knockout tournament, organized by the Portuguese Football Federation (FPF). The 1965–66 Taça de Portugal began on 6 November 1965. The final was played on 22 May 1966 at the Estádio Nacional.

Vitória de Setúbal were the previous holders, having defeated Benfica 3–1 in the previous season's final. Defending champions Vitória de Setúbal reached the final but were unable to regain the Taça de Portugal as Braga defeated the Sadinos 1–0 to claim their first Taça de Portugal.

== First round ==
Ties were played between the 6–21 November, whilst replays were played at a later date. Unlike previous editions, two legged first round cup ties were abolished which meant that each cup tie would be contested over one leg. In case a match was tied, the tie would be replayed at a later date. Teams from the Primeira Liga (I) and the Portuguese Second Division (II) entered at this stage.

Team 1	Agg.	Team 2	1st leg	2nd leg
Alhandra (II)	1 – 0	Lusitano de Évora (I)	1 – 0	
Atlético CP (II)	6 – 1	Torreense (II)	6 – 1	
Barreirense (I)	2 – 1	Casa Pia (II)	2 – 1	
Beira-Mar (I)	1 – 0	Marinhense (II)	1 – 0	
Belenenses (I)	5 – 2	União de Tomar (II)	5 – 2	
Benfica (I)	2 – 0	Oliveirense (II)	2 – 0	
Boavista (II)	0 – 1	Fabril Barreiro (I)	0 – 1	
Braga (I)	5 – 2	Ovarense (II)	5 – 2	
Cova da Piedade (II)	4 – 1	Académica de Coimbra (I)	4 – 1	
Famalicão (II)	0 – 3	Vitória de Setúbal (I)	0 – 3	
Leça (II)	0 – 1	Sporting CP (I)	0 – 1	
Leixões (I)	4 – 1	Penafiel (II)	4 – 1	
Oriental (II)	4 – 2	Luso (II)	4 – 2	
Peniche (II)	0 – 5	Olhanense (II)	0 – 0	0 – 5
Sanjoanense (II)	3 – 0	Leões Santarém (II)	3 – 0	
Seixal (II)	2 – 1	Sintrense (II)	2 – 1	
Sporting da Covilhã (II)	3 – 0	Almada (II)	3 – 0	
Sporting de Espinho (II)	0 – 1	Portimonense (II)	0 – 1	
União de Lamas (II)	4 – 1	Desportivo de Beja (II)	4 – 1	
Varzim (I)	0 – 1	Porto (I)	0 – 1	
Vitória de Guimarães (I)	4 – 1	Salgueiros (II)	4 – 1	

== Second round ==
Ties were played between the 1–10 December and the 22 February, whilst replays were played at a later date. Due to the odd number of teams involved at this stage of the competition, Cova da Piedade qualified for the next round due to having no opponent to face at this stage of the competition.

Team 1	Agg.	Team 2	1st leg	2nd leg
Alhandra (II)	1 – 4	Benfica (I)	1 – 4	
Barreirense (I)	2 – 0	Sporting da Covilhã (II)	2 – 0	
Beira-Mar (I)	1 – 0	Olhanense (II)	1 – 0	
Belenenses (I)	1 – 2	Leixões (I)	1 – 2	
Braga (I)	3 – 2	Atlético CP (II)	3 – 2	
Oriental (II)	1 – 3	Fabril Barreiro (I)	1 – 3	
Sanjoanense (II)	1 – 4	Porto (I)	0 – 0	1 – 4
Seixal (II)	1 – 4	Portimonense (II)	1 – 1	0 – 3
União de Lamas (II)	0 – 3	Vitória de Setúbal (I)	0 – 3	
Vitória de Guimarães (I)	1 – 3	Sporting CP (I)	1 – 3	

== Third round ==
Ties were played between the 9–20 March. Third round ties were contested over two legs. Due to the odd number of teams involved at this stage of the competition, Beira-Mar and Vitória de Setúbal qualified for the next round due to having no opponent to face at this stage of the competition. Lusitânia, Marítimo, and Mindelense were invited to participate in the competition.

Team 1	Agg.	Team 2	1st leg	2nd leg
Barreirense (I)	2 – 3	Leixões (I)	1 – 1	1 – 2
Cova da Piedade (II)	1 – 3	Porto (I)	1 – 2	0 – 1
Lusitânia (N/A)	2 – 6	Braga (I)	0 – 3	2 – 3
Mindelense (N/A)	2 – 11	Marítimo (N/A)	2 – 4	0 – 7
Portimonense (II)	3 – 7	Benfica (I)	2 – 2	1 – 5
Sporting CP (I)	2 – 1	Fabril Barreiro (I)	1 – 1	1 – 0

== Quarter-finals ==
Ties were played on the 10–19 April.

Team 1	Agg.	Team 2	1st leg	2nd leg	3rd leg	4th leg
Beira-Mar (I)	6 – 5	Leixões (I)	1 – 1	1 – 1	2 – 2	2 – 1
Braga (I)	5 – 4	Benfica (I)	4 – 1	1 – 3		
Sporting CP (I)	3 – 1	Porto (I)	1 – 0	0 – 1	2 – 0	
Vitória de Setúbal (I)	6 – 1	Marítimo (N/A)	3 – 0	3 – 1		

== Semi-finals ==
Ties were played on the 8–17 May.

Team 1	Agg.	Team 2	1st leg	2nd leg	3rd leg
Beira-Mar (I)	0 – 6	Vitória de Setúbal (I)	0 – 3	0 – 3	
Braga (I)	3 – 2	Sporting CP (I)	1 – 1	1 – 1	1 – 0

== Final ==
22 May 1966

Braga	1 – 0	Vitória de Setúbal
Perrichon 77'	(Report)

Estádio Nacional, Oeiras
Attendance: 35,000
Referee: Braga Barros (Leiria)
