= Félix Guerreiro =

Portuguese footballer (born 1945)

Personal information
- Full name: Félix Marques Guerreiro
- Date of birth: 26 July 1945 (age 81)
- Place of birth: Lisbon, Portugal
- Position: Winger

Youth career
- 1963–1964: Benfica

Senior career*
Years	Team	Apps	(Gls)
1964–1966	Benfica	3	(2)
1966–1973	Vitória Setúbal	137	(41)
1973–1976	Atlético CP	37	(6)

International career
	Portugal U18	6	(2)
	Portugal U21	3	(1)
	Portugal B	1	(0)
1969–1971	Portugal	3	(0)
- * Club domestic league appearances and goals

Félix Marques Guerreiro (born 26 July 1945) is a former Portuguese footballer who played as a forward.
