= Ferreira Pinto (footballer, born 1939) =

Portuguese footballer

Personal information
- Full name: José Fernando Ferreira Pinto
- Date of birth: 7 November 1939 (age 86)
- Place of birth: Benguela, Angola
- Height: 1.73 m (5 ft 8 in)
- Position: Midfielder

Senior career*
Years	Team	Apps	(Gls)
1958–1962	Sporting CP	13	(0)
1962–1965	CUF	61	(32)
1965–1968	Benfica	20	(1)
1968–1970	União Tomar	47	(1)
Total		141	(34)

International career
1965	Portugal	2	(0)
- * Club domestic league appearances and goals

José Fernando Ferreira Pinto (born 7 November 1939 in Benguela, Portuguese Angola) is a retired Portuguese footballer who played as a midfielder.
