= Pedras (footballer, born 1941) =

Portuguese footballer

Personal information
- Full name: José Maria de Freitas Pereira
- Date of birth: 29 October 1941
- Place of birth: Guimarães, Portugal
- Date of death: 12 July 2017 (aged 75)
- Place of death: Lisbon, Portugal
- Position: Attacking midfielder

Youth career
- 1958–1960: Vitória Guimarães

Senior career*
Years	Team	Apps	(Gls)
1960–1962	Vitória Guimarães	38	(18)
1962–1966	Benfica	16	(7)
1966–1968	Vitória Setúbal	50	(15)
1968–1971	Sporting CP	41	(9)
1971–1973	Atlético	38	(3)
1973–1974	Sintrense		
1974–1975	Seixal		
Total		183	(52)

International career
1967–1968	Portugal	3	(0)
- * Club domestic league appearances and goals

José Maria de Freitas Pereira (29 October 1941 – 12 July 2017), known as Pedras, was a Portuguese footballer who played as an attacking midfielder.
