= 1966–67 DFB-Pokal =

Tournament details
- Country: West Germany
- Teams: 32

Final positions
- Champions: Bayern Munich
- Runners-up: Hamburg

Tournament statistics
- Matches played: 40

The 1966–67 DFB-Pokal was the 24th season of the annual German football cup competition. It began on 25 December 1966 and ended on 10 June 1967. 32 teams competed in the tournament of five rounds. In the final Bayern Munich defeated Hamburg 4–0, thus defending their title from the previous season.

== Matches ==
=== Qualification round ===
25 December 1966
Altonaer FC 93	2 – 1	1. FC Nürnberg
31 December 1966
KSV Hessen Kassel	6 – 2	Eintracht Frankfurt

=== First round ===
14 January 1967
Borussia Dortmund	2 – 2	1. FC Köln	(AET)
Eintracht Braunschweig	2 – 3	MSV Duisburg	(AET)
FC Schalke 04	4 – 2	Borussia Mönchengladbach
Duisburger SV	0 – 2	Schwarz-Weiß Essen
Alemannia Aachen	1 – 1	FK Pirmasens	(AET)
SV Waldhof Mannheim	1 – 3	Fortuna Düsseldorf
Hertha BSC	2 – 3	FC Bayern Munich	(AET)
KSV Hessen Kassel	2 – 2	SV Werder Bremen	(AET)
Altonaer FC 93	0 – 6	Hamburger SV
Rot-Weiß Essen	1 – 2	Karlsruher SC
VfB Lübeck	0 – 1	Kickers Offenbach	(AET)
Arminia Hannover	1 – 4	TSV 1860 München
1. FC Saarbrücken	2 – 4	VfB Stuttgart
SpVgg Erkenschwick	1 – 0	Stuttgarter Kickers
Hannover 96 II	2 – 2	Borussia Neunkirchen	(AET)
18 January 1967
1. FC Kaiserslautern	2 – 1	Hannover 96

==== Replays ====
24 January 1967
1. FC Köln	1 – 0	Borussia Dortmund
SV Werder Bremen	2 – 1	KSV Hessen Kassel	(AET)
25 January 1967
FK Pirmasens	0 – 1	Alemannia Aachen
Borussia Neunkirchen	2 – 1	Hannover 96 II

=== Round of 16 ===
3 February 1967
1. FC Köln	0 – 0	Hamburger SV	(AET)
Alemannia Aachen	4 – 2	Karlsruher SC
Borussia Neunkirchen	1 – 1	SV Werder Bremen	(AET)
VfB Stuttgart	0 – 1	FC Schalke 04
1. FC Kaiserslautern	0 – 0	Kickers Offenbach	(AET)
Schwarz-Weiß Essen	1 – 1	Fortuna Düsseldorf	(AET)
SpVgg Erkenschwick	1 – 3	FC Bayern Munich
TSV 1860 München	1 – 0	MSV Duisburg

==== Replays ====
14 February 1967
Hamburger SV	2 – 0	1. FC Köln
SV Werder Bremen	1 – 2	Borussia Neunkirchen
Kickers Offenbach	1 – 0	1. FC Kaiserslautern	(AET)
Fortuna Düsseldorf	1 – 0	Schwarz-Weiß Essen

=== Quarter-finals ===
25 March 1967
TSV 1860 München	2 – 0	Fortuna Düsseldorf
Kickers Offenbach	0 – 0	Hamburger SV	(AET)
Alemannia Aachen	3 – 1	Borussia Neunkirchen
FC Schalke 04	2 – 3	FC Bayern Munich

==== Replay ====
12 April 1967
Hamburger SV	2 – 0	Kickers Offenbach

=== Semi-finals ===
6 May 1967

Hamburger SV	3 – 1	Alemannia Aachen
Pohlschmidt 24'; C.Dörfel 29'; B.Dörfel 90'		Hermandung 29'

Volksparkstadion, Hamburg
Attendance: 34,000
Referee: Siebert (Mannheim)

6 May 1967

Bayern Munich	3 – 1	TSV 1860 Munich
Ohlhauser 63', 75'; Kupferschmidt 65'		Bründl 78'

Stadion an der Grünwalder Straße, Munich
Attendance: 42,000
Referee: Kreitlein (Stuttgart)

=== Final ===
10 June 1967
16:00 CET

Hamburger SV	0–4	Bayern Munich
	Report	Müller 23', 76'; Ohlhauser 72'; Brenninger 85' (pen.)

Neckarstadion, Stuttgart
Attendance: 68,000
Referee: Karl Niemeyer (Bad Godesberg)
