= UEFA Cup Winners' Cup =

European club football tournament (1960–1999)

- Organiser(s): UEFA
- Founded: 1960; 66 years ago (rebranded in 1994)
- Abolished: 1999; 27 years ago
- Region: Europe
- Teams: 32 (first round)
- Related competitions: European Cup (1st tier); UEFA Cup (3rd tier; merged with)
- Last champions: (Italy) Lazio (1st title)
- Most championships: (Spain) Barcelona (4 titles)

The UEFA Cup Winners' Cup was a European football club competition contested annually by the winners of domestic cup competitions. The competition's official name was originally the European Cup Winners' Cup; it was renamed the UEFA Cup Winners' Cup in 1994. Chronologically, the Cup Winners' Cup was the second inter-European club competition organised by UEFA.

The first tournament was held in 1960–61, but it was organised by the Mitropa Cup's Organising Committee and not recognised by the governing body of European football until 1963, when it was accepted as a UEFA competition on the initiative of the Italian Football Federation (FIGC). From 1972 onwards, the winner of the tournament progressed to play the winner of the European Cup (later the UEFA Champions League) in the European Super Cup.

The tournament ran for 39 seasons, with the final edition held in 1998–99, after which it was discontinued. Since the abolition of the UEFA Cup Winners' Cup, the UEFA Super Cup place previously reserved for the Cup Winners' Cup winner has been taken by the winner of the UEFA Cup, now the UEFA Europa League.

== Format ==
Winners UEFA Cup Winners' Cup
Season	Winning club
European Cup Winners' Cup
1960–61	(Italy) Fiorentina
1961–62	(Spain) Atlético Madrid
1962–63	(England) Tottenham Hotspur
1963–64	(Portugal) Sporting CP
1964–65	(England) West Ham United
1965–66	(West Germany) Borussia Dortmund
1966–67	(West Germany) Bayern Munich
1967–68	(Italy) Milan
1968–69	(Czechoslovakia) Slovan Bratislava
1969–70	(England) Manchester City
1970–71	(England) Chelsea
1971–72	(Scotland) Rangers
1972–73	(Italy) Milan (2)
1973–74	(East Germany) 1. FC Magdeburg
1974–75	(Soviet Union) Dynamo Kyiv
1975–76	(Belgium) Anderlecht
1976–77	(West Germany) Hamburger SV
1977–78	(Belgium) Anderlecht (2)
1978–79	(Spain) Barcelona
1979–80	(Spain) Valencia
1980–81	(Soviet Union) Dinamo Tbilisi
1981–82	(Spain) Barcelona (2)
1982–83	(Scotland) Aberdeen
1983–84	(Italy) Juventus
1984–85	(England) Everton
1985–86	(Soviet Union) Dynamo Kyiv (2)
1986–87	(Netherlands) Ajax
1987–88	(Belgium) KV Mechelen
1988–89	(Spain) Barcelona (3)
1989–90	(Italy) Sampdoria
1990–91	(England) Manchester United
1991–92	(Germany) Werder Bremen
1992–93	(Italy) Parma
1993–94	(England) Arsenal
UEFA Cup Winners' Cup
1994–95	(Spain) Zaragoza
1995–96	(France) Paris Saint-Germain
1996–97	(Spain) Barcelona (4)
1997–98	(England) Chelsea (2)
1998–99	(Italy) Lazio

Throughout its 39-year history, the Cup Winners' Cup was always a straight knock-out tournament with two-legged home and away ties until the single match final staged at a neutral venue, the only exception to this being the two-legged final in the competition's first year. In common with other UEFA club tournaments, the away goals rule was applied when aggregate scores were tied. The format was identical to the original European Champions' Cup with 32 teams contesting four knock-out rounds prior to the showpiece final, with the tournament usually running from September to May each year. Following the influx of new UEFA member nations during the 1990s, a regular August preliminary round was added to reduce the number of entrants to 32.

Entry was restricted to one club from each UEFA member association, the only exception being to allow the current Cup Winners' Cup holders to enter alongside their nation's new domestic cup winners in order to allow them a chance to defend their Cup Winners' Cup title (although no club ever managed to do this). However, if this team also qualified for the European Champions' Cup, then they would default on their place in the Cup Winners' Cup and no other team would replace them. If a domestic cup holder also wins the Cup Winners' Cup in the same season, the domestic cup runner-up will take that association's berth.

On occasions when a club completed a domestic league and cup 'double' that club would enter the European Cup/UEFA Champions League and their place in the Cup Winners' Cup would be taken by the domestic cup runners-up. In 1998–99, the competition's final year, Heerenveen of the Netherlands entered the Cup Winners' Cup despite only reaching the semi-final of the previous season's KNVB Cup. This was due to both KNVB Cup finalists Ajax and PSV Eindhoven qualifying for the recently expanded Champions League.

== History ==
=== Early tournaments ===
The earliest events where cup holders from different countries met were the friendly games nicknamed "world championships" at the end of the 19th century between English and Scottish cup holders. The respective leagues were yet established, and therefore, the first two editions involved meetings between cup holders – the fourth edition involved cup holders as well (won by Aston Villa, Renton, and Heart of Midlothian, respectively) – exception being the 1895 edition, where English champions Sunderland beat Scottish champions Heart of Midlothian.

=== Inauguration and prestige ===
Mirroring the circumstances behind the creation of the European Cup five years earlier, the idea for a pan-European cup competition contested by all of Europe's domestic cup winners came from prominent European sports journalists. The European Cup had proven to be a great success and the Fairs Cup had also proven popular – as a result, other ideas for new European football tournaments were being aired. One proposal was for a tournament based upon the format of the European Cup, but with national cup winners rather than league champions taking part, which could run alongside that competition.

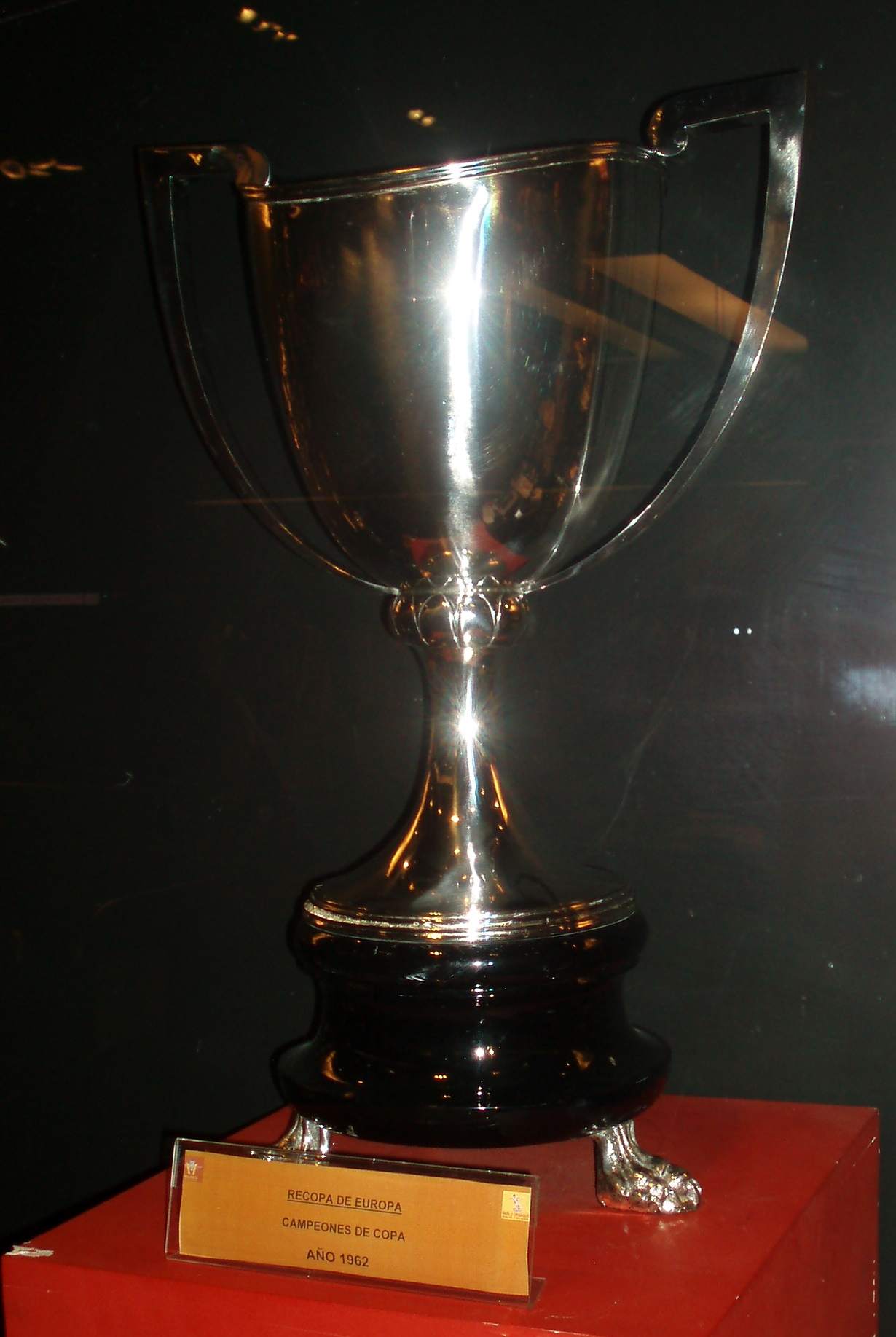
The trophy awarded to Atlético Madrid in 1962

The inaugural Cup Winners' Cup was held in the 1960–61 season and was a semi-official pilot tournament. However, the initial reaction to the competition's creation was unenthusiastic on the part of many of Europe's top clubs – many European associations did not have domestic cup competitions at the time and in those countries that did, the cup competition was generally held in low esteem and often not taken seriously by the bigger clubs. It was essentially only in England, Scotland and to a lesser extent Germany and Spain that the domestic cup was considered especially prestigious. Many were sceptical about the viability of a European tournament for cup winners and many of the bigger clubs eligible to contest the first CWC turned down the chance to enter, such as Atlético Madrid of Spain and Monaco of France.

Ultimately the inaugural CWC was contested by just 10 clubs (with Fiorentina of Italy winning the two-legged final against the Scottish team Rangers) but the games were generally well attended and the response from the public and the media to the new tournament was positive and enthusiastic. For the tournament's second season in 1961–62, UEFA took over the running of all aspects of the competition and this time all the clubs eligible to enter accepted the opportunity.

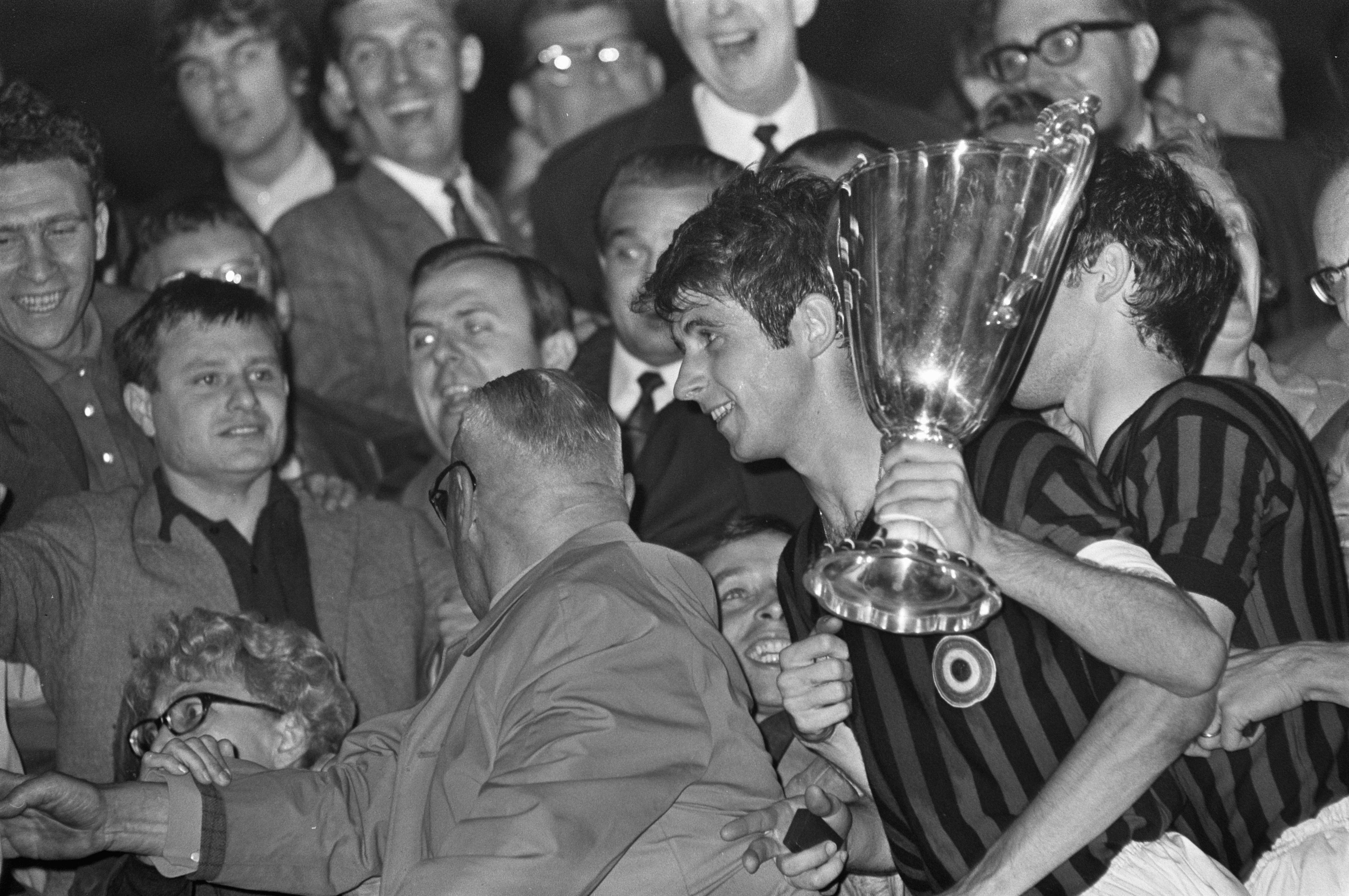
The trophy awarded to Milan in 1968

By 1968, all UEFA member nations had set up domestic cup competitions due to the success of the Cup Winners' Cup. UEFA regarded it as the second most prestigious competition, behind the European Cup (later the UEFA Champions League) and ahead of the Fairs Cup (later the UEFA Cup). Therefore, a team qualified for both the European Cup and the Cup Winners' Cup would play in the European Cup, whereas a team qualified for both the UEFA Cup and the Cup Winners' Cup would play in the Cup Winners' Cup. Nevertheless, many commentators and fans regarded the Cup Winners' Cup as weaker than the UEFA Cup, which had more and better teams from the stronger European leagues.

In the 1985–86 season, English clubs were banned from European competition as a result of Heysel Stadium disaster. Consequently, Manchester United, Everton, Coventry City, Wimbledon and Liverpool were prevented from competing in the Cup Winners' Cup until the beginning of the 1990–91 season.

No club managed to retain the Cup Winners' Cup, although eight times a winning side followed up their victories with a losing appearance in the following season's final.

=== Decline ===
After the establishment of the UEFA Champions League (formerly called the European Champion Clubs' Cup) in the early 1990s, the standing and prestige of the Cup Winners' Cup began to decline. With the expansion of the Champions League in 1997 to allow more than one team from the highest-ranked member associations to enter, the Cup Winners' Cup began to look noticeably inferior. Many of the bigger teams who would previously have entered the Cup Winners' Cup were now gaining entry to the Champions League instead by finishing second in their domestic league – such as Cup Winners' Cup holders Barcelona in 1997–98 and Bayern Munich and PSV Eindhoven in 1998–99 – and this greatly weakened the Cup Winners' Cup.

At the time of the Champions League expansion, UEFA also considered expanding the Cup Winners' Cup from 32 teams to 64 by allowing a second team to enter from many countries, although by what qualification criteria the second entrants would be determined were never settled upon – ultimately UEFA did not make any of these changes to the Cup Winners' Cup.

By the late 1990s, the Cup Winners' Cup had come to be seen as a second-rate competition with only one or two big name teams available to enter each year and the interest in the tournament from both major clubs and the public dropped. Finally, with the further expansion of the UEFA Champions League to include as many as three or four teams from the top footballing nations, the decision was taken to abolish the competition after the end of the 1998–99 tournament and merge it into the UEFA Cup (now the UEFA Europa League). Since then, domestic cup winners who do not otherwise qualify for the Champions League are given a place in the Europa League.

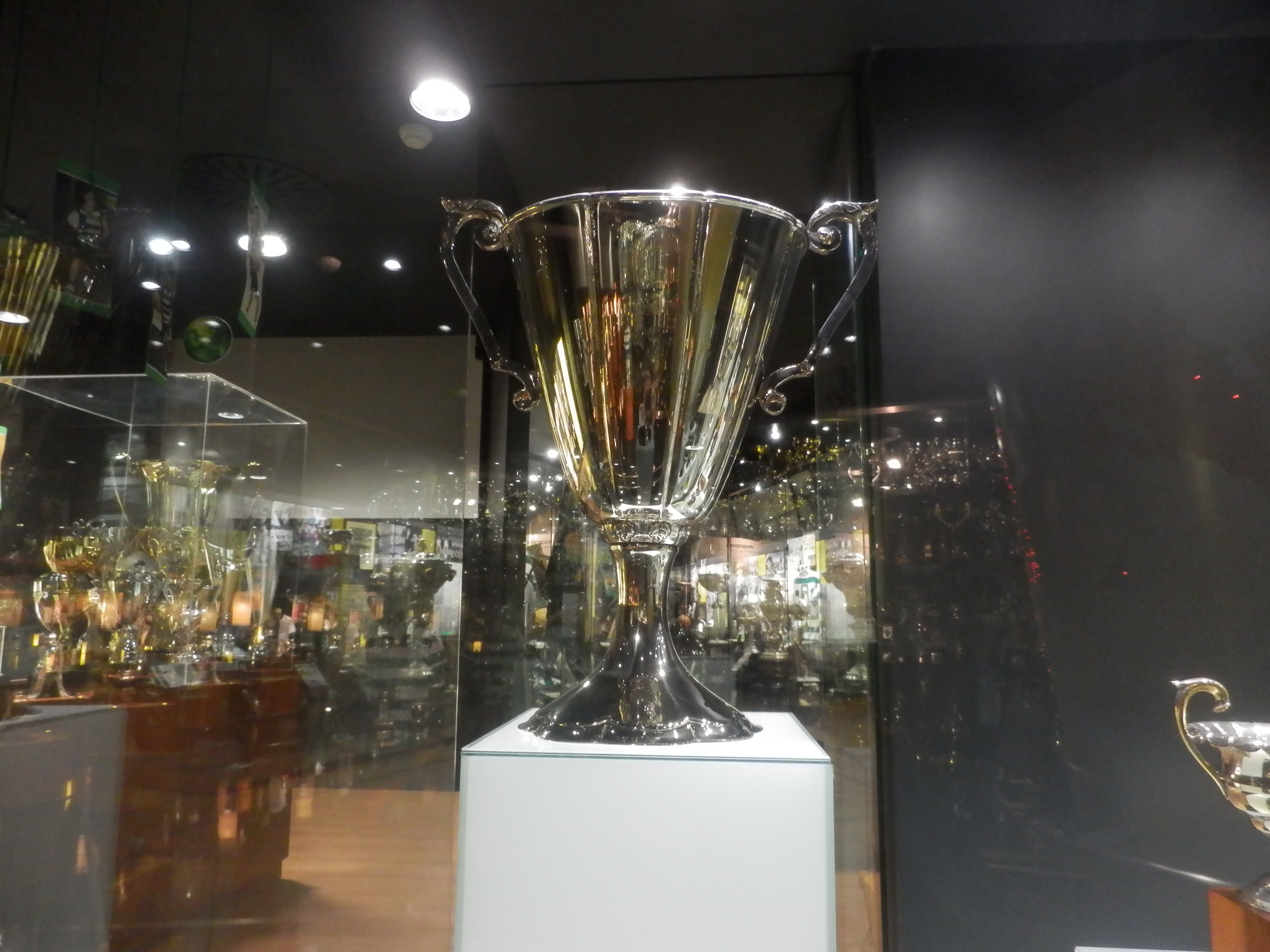
The trophy awarded to Sporting CP in 1964

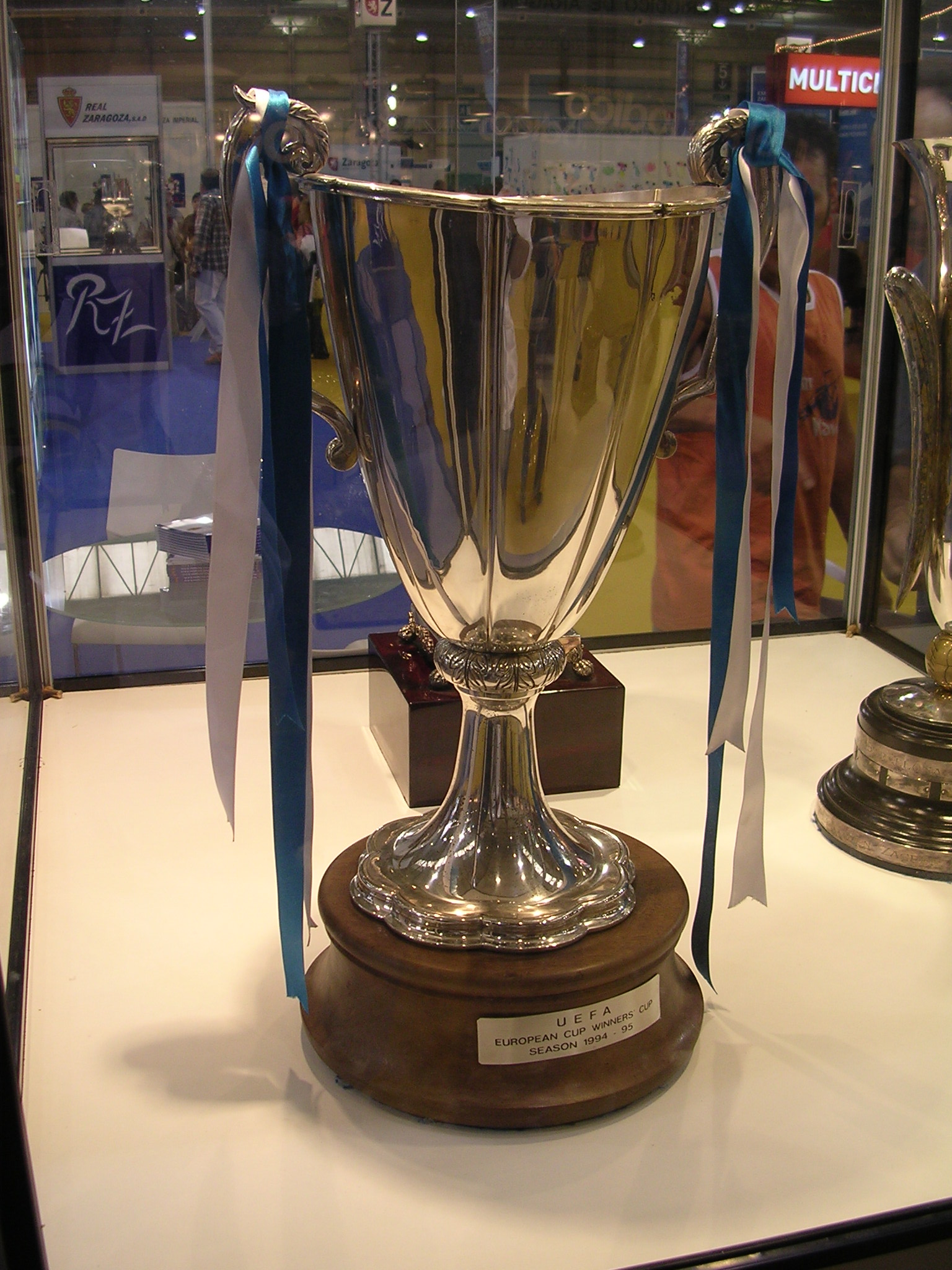
The trophy awarded to Zaragoza in 1995

=== The trophy ===
The Cup Winners' Cup trophy itself is a property of UEFA and it is not assigned to any club, though clubs were allowed to have replicas made. There were various versions of the trophy awarded throughout its history. The first was only awarded in its maiden season to Fiorentina. The appearance of the second trophy differed significantly from the successor versions. The third and the fourth trophy differed only in the type of base. The wooden-based trophy was awarded to the winners during the 1990s, with exception of 1993 when the special version with a metal base was awarded to Parma.

== Records and statistics ==
=== Winners ===
Performance in the UEFA Cup Winners' Cup by club
Club	Titles	Runners-up	Years won	Years runner-up
(Spain) Barcelona	4	2	1979, 1982, 1989, 1997	1969, 1991
(Belgium) Anderlecht	2	2	1976, 1978	1977, 1990
(Italy) Milan	2	1	1968, 1973	1974
(England) Chelsea	2	0	1971, 1998	—
(Soviet Union) Dynamo Kyiv	2	0	1975, 1986	—
(Spain) Atlético Madrid	1	2	1962	1963, 1986
(Scotland) Rangers	1	2	1972	1961, 1967
(England) Arsenal	1	2	1994	1980, 1995
(Italy) Fiorentina	1	1	1961	1962
(England) West Ham United	1	1	1965	1976
(Germany) Hamburger SV	1	1	1977	1968
(Netherlands) Ajax	1	1	1987	1988
(Italy) Sampdoria	1	1	1990	1989
(Italy) Parma	1	1	1993	1994
(France) Paris Saint-Germain	1	1	1996	1997
(England) Tottenham Hotspur	1	0	1963	—
(Portugal) Sporting CP	1	0	1964	—
(Germany) Borussia Dortmund	1	0	1966	—
(Germany) Bayern Munich	1	0	1967	—
(Czechoslovakia) Slovan Bratislava	1	0	1969	—
(England) Manchester City	1	0	1970	—
(East Germany) 1. FC Magdeburg	1	0	1974	—
(Spain) Valencia	1	0	1980	—
(Soviet Union) Dinamo Tbilisi	1	0	1981	—
(Scotland) Aberdeen	1	0	1983	—
(Italy) Juventus	1	0	1984	—
(England) Everton	1	0	1985	—
(Belgium) KV Mechelen	1	0	1988	—
(England) Manchester United	1	0	1991	—
(Germany) Werder Bremen	1	0	1992	—
(Spain) Zaragoza	1	0	1995	—
(Italy) Lazio	1	0	1999	—
(Spain) Real Madrid	0	2	—	1971, 1983
(Austria) Rapid Wien	0	2	—	1985, 1996
(Hungary) MTK Budapest	0	1	—	1964
(Germany) 1860 Munich	0	1	—	1965
(England) Liverpool	0	1	—	1966
(Poland) Górnik Zabrze	0	1	—	1970
(Soviet Union) Dynamo Moscow	0	1	—	1972
(England) Leeds United	0	1	—	1973
(Hungary) Ferencváros	0	1	—	1975
Austria Wien	0	1	—	1978
(Germany) Fortuna Düsseldorf	0	1	—	1979
(East Germany) Carl Zeiss Jena	0	1	—	1981
(Belgium) Standard Liège	0	1	—	1982
(Portugal) Porto	0	1	—	1984
(East Germany) 1. FC Lokomotive Leipzig	0	1	—	1987
(France) Monaco	0	1	—	1992
(Belgium) Antwerp	0	1	—	1993
(Germany) VfB Stuttgart	0	1	—	1998
(Spain) Mallorca	0	1	—	1999

=== By nation ===
Performance in finals by nation
Nation	Titles	Runners-up	Total
England	8	5	13
Spain	7	7	14
Italy	7	4	11
Germany (Note: Includes clubs representing West Germany.)	4	4	8
Belgium	3	4	7
Soviet Union (Note: Two Soviet final appearances were by a Ukrainian SSR club (both won), one was by a Georgian SSR club (won) and one was by a Russian SFSR club (lost).)	3	1	4
Scotland	2	2	4
France	1	2	3
East Germany	1	2	3
Netherlands	1	1	2
Portugal	1	1	2
Czechoslovakia (Note: The Czechoslovak final appearance was by a Slovak SR club.)	1	0	1
Austria	0	3	3
Hungary	0	2	2
Poland	0	1	1

=== By manager ===
- Four managers hold the record of winning the competition on two occasions:
  - Nereo Rocco: 1968 and 1973 (Milan)
  - Valeriy Lobanovskyi in 1975 and 1986 (Dynamo Kyiv)
  - Johan Cruyff: 1987 (Ajax) and 1989 (Barcelona)
  - Alex Ferguson: 1983 (Aberdeen) and 1991 (Manchester United)

=== By player ===
- Most UEFA Cup Winners' Cup titles: Lobo Carrasco (3)
  - Barcelona (3): (1978–79, 1981–82, 1988–89)

== See also ==
- CONCACAF Cup Winners Cup
- African Cup Winners' Cup
- Asian Cup Winners' Cup
