= 1970–71 FC Bayern Munich season =

6th season of Bayern Munich in the Bundesliga

Bayern Munich
1970–71 season
- Chairman: Wilhelm Neudecker
- Manager: Udo Lattek
- Stadium: Grünwalder Stadion
- Bundesliga: 2nd
- DFB-Pokal: Winners
- Inter-Cities Fairs Cup: Quarter-finals
- Top goalscorer: League: Gerd Müller (22); All: Gerd Müller (39)

The 1970–71 FC Bayern Munich season was the club's sixth season in Bundesliga.

Bayern won the DFB-Pokal Cup this season and finished second in the Bundesliga, two points behind league champions Borussia Mönchengladbach.

== Team kit ==
Home	Away	Away 2	Away 3

== Squad ==
Note: Flags indicate national team as defined under FIFA eligibility rules; some limited exceptions apply. Players may hold more than one non-FIFA nationality.

No.	Pos.	Nation	Player
—	GK	GER	Sepp Maier
—	GK	GER	Manfred Seifert
—	DF	DEN	Johnny Hansen
—	DF	GER	Hans-Georg Schwarzenbeck
—	DF	GER	Herward Koppenhöfer
—	DF	AUT	Peter Pumm
—	DF	GER	Paul Breitner
—	DF	GER	Peter Kupferschmidt
—	DF	GER	Franz Beckenbauer

No.	Pos.	Nation	Player
—	MF	GER	Franz Roth
—	MF	GER	Rainer Zobel
—	FW	GER	Gerd Müller
—	FW	GER	Dieter Brenninger
—	FW	GER	Uli Hoeneß
—	FW	GER	Karl-Heinz Mrosko
—	FW	GER	Edgar Schneider
—	FW	GER	Erich Maas
—	FW	GER	Jürgen Ey

== Match results ==
=== Legend ===
Win Draw Loss

=== Bundesliga ===
==== League fixtures and results ====
15 August 1970 1	VfB Stuttgart	1–1	Bayern Munich	Stuttgart
15:30 CET	Handschuh 24'	Report	Hansen 22'	Stadium: Neckarstadion; Attendance: 60,000; Referee: Ferdinand Biwersi

22 August 1970 2	Bayern Munich	1–0	Hertha BSC	Munich
15:30 CET	Brenninger 72'	Report		Stadium: Grünwalder Stadion; Attendance: 35,000; Referee: Gerd Hennig

28 August 1970 3	Borussia Dortmund	0–0	Bayern Munich	Dortmund
19:30 CET		Report		Stadium: Stadion Rote Erde; Attendance: 39,000; Referee: Walter Horstmann

5 September 1970 4	Bayern Munich	2–2	Rot-Weiss Essen	Munich
15:30 CET	Roth 6'; Müller 37'	Report	Hohnhausen 58'; Lippens 65'	Stadium: Grünwalder Stadion; Attendance: 20,000; Referee: Peter Gabor

12 September 1970 5	Eintracht Frankfurt	0–1	Bayern Munich	Frankfurt
15:30 CET		Report	Roth 62'	Stadium: Waldstadion; Attendance: 31,000; Referee: Jan Redelfs

19 September 1970 6	Bayern Munich	2–2	Borussia Mönchengladbach	Munich
15:30 CET	Schwarzenbeck 14'; Müller 74'	Report	Sieloff 64' (pen.); Heynckes 90'	Stadium: Grünwalder Stadion; Attendance: 43,000; Referee: Ferdinand Biwersi

23 September 1970 7	Hamburger SV	1–5	Bayern Munich	Hamburg
20:00 CET	Dörfel 26'; Zaczyk (penalty missed) 90'	Report	Roth 30', 43', 71'; Müller 42'; Mrosko 53'	Stadium: Volksparkstadion; Attendance: 42,000; Referee: Alfred Köhler

26 September 1970 8	Bayern Munich	4–1	Hannover 96	Munich
15:30 CET	Mrosko 10'; Müller 20'; Roth 84', 88'	Report	Keller 84'	Stadium: Grünwalder Stadion; Attendance: 22,000; Referee: Karl-Heinz Fork

3 October 1970 9	Arminia Bielefeld	1–0	Bayern Munich	Bielefeld
15:30 CET	Braun 60'	Report		Stadium: Bielefelder Alm; Attendance: 26,500; Referee: Klaus Ohmsen

7 October 1970 10	Bayern Munich	3–1	1. FC Kaiserslautern	Munich
19:30 CET	Brenninger 22'; Müller 49', 76' (pen.)	Report	Vogt 87'	Stadium: Grünwalder Stadion; Attendance: 20,000; Referee: Werner Burgers

10 October 1970 11	Bayern Munich	0–0	Kickers Offenbach	Munich
15:30 CET		Report		Stadium: Grünwalder Stadion; Attendance: 20,000; Referee: Heinz Aldinger

23 October 1970 12	Rot-Weiß Oberhausen	0–4	Bayern Munich	Oberhausen
20:00 CET		Report	Müller 9'; Brenninger 23', 77'; Roth 60'	Stadium: Niederrheinstadion; Attendance: 30,000; Referee: Elmar Schäfer

29 October 1970 13	Bayern Munich	3–0	Schalke 04	Munich
20:00 CET	Brenninger 38'; Mrosko 72'; Schwarzenbeck 78'	Report		Stadium: Grünwalder Stadion; Attendance: 40,000; Referee: Rudolf Schröck

7 November 1970 14	1. FC Köln	0–3	Bayern Munich	Cologne
15:30 CET		Report	Müller 61'; Roth 75'; Brenninger 85'	Stadium: Müngersdorfer Stadion; Attendance: 40,000; Referee: Diedrich Basedow

14 November 1970 15	Bayern Munich	2–1	Werder Bremen	Munich
15:30 CET	Roth 52'; Müller 59'	Report	Coordes 90'	Stadium: Grünwalder Stadion; Attendance: 16,000; Referee: Walter Eschweiler

28 November 1970 16	Eintracht Braunschweig	1–1	Bayern Munich	Braunschweig
15:30 CET	Saborowski 82'	Report	Hoeneß 57'	Stadium: Eintracht-Stadion; Attendance: 35,768; Referee: Horst Bonacker

4 December 1970 17	Bayern Munich	2–1	MSV Duisburg	Munich
20:00 CET	Pumm 24'; Roth 85'	Report	Linßen 26'	Stadium: Grünwalder Stadion; Attendance: 14,000; Referee: Heinz Quindeau

23 January 1971 18	Bayern Munich	1–0	VfB Stuttgart	Munich
15:30 CET	Mrosko 65'	Report		Stadium: Grünwalder Stadion; Attendance: 22,000; Referee: Norbert Fuchs

30 January 1971 19	Hertha BSC	3–3	Bayern Munich	Berlin
15:30 CET	Gayer 19', 48'; Horr 79' (pen.)	Report	Müller 5'; Brenninger 24'; Hoeneß 77'	Stadium: Olympic Stadium; Attendance: 70,000; Referee: Walter Eschweiler

4 May 1971 20	Bayern Munich	1–1	Borussia Dortmund	Munich
20:00 CET	Brenninger 57'	Report	Weinkauff 61'	Stadium: Grünwalder Stadion; Attendance: 21,000; Referee: Günter Linn

13 March 1971 21	Rot-Weiß Essen	3–1	Bayern Munich	Essen
15:30 CET	Lippens 59'; Hohnhausen 65', 66'	Report	Müller 9'	Stadium: Georg-Melches-Stadion; Attendance: 25,000; Referee: Jan Redelfs

18 May 1971 22	Bayern Munich	2–1	Eintracht Frankfurt	Munich
20:00 CET	Müller 5', 59' (pen.)	Report	Heese 64'	Stadium: Grünwalder Stadion; Attendance: 25,000; Referee: Rudolf Schröck

14 April 1971 23	Borussia Mönchengladbach	3–1	Bayern Munich	Mönchengladbach
20:00 CET	Netzer 37' le Fevre 56'; Laumen 83'	Report	Mrosko 66'	Stadium: Bökelbergstadion; Attendance: 30,000; Referee: Horst Herden

13 March 1971 24	Bayern Munich	4–2	Hamburger SV	Munich
15:30 CET	Hoeneß 16'; Müller 28' (pen.), 42', 50'; Beckenbauer 82'; Brenninger 90'	Report	Zaczyk 30' (pen.); Beyer 51'	Stadium: Grünwalder Stadion; Attendance: 25,000; Referee: Gerd Hennig

20 March 1971 25	Hannover 96	2–2	Bayern Munich	Hannover
15:30 CET	Bertl 47'; Reimann 52'	Report	Zobel 43', 88'	Stadium: Niedersachsenstadion; Attendance: 57,000; Referee: Ferdinand Biwersi

27 March 1971 26	Bayern Munich	2–0	Arminia Bielefeld	Munich
15:30 CET	Brenninger 19'; Müller 70'	Report		Stadium: Grünwalder Stadion; Attendance: 14,268; Referee: Walter Horstmann

3 April 1971 27	1. FC Kaiserslautern	2–1	Bayern Munich	Kaiserslautern
15:30 CET	Hošić 84'; Fuchs 85'	Report	Hoeneß 66'	Stadium: Betzenbergstadion; Attendance: 32,000; Referee: Hans-Joachim Weyland

17 April 1971 28	Kickers Offenbach	1–1	Bayern Munich	Offenbach
15:30 CET	Bechtold 63' (pen.)	Report	Müller 77'; Roth (red card) 77'	Stadium: Stadion am Bieberer Berg; Attendance: 3,500; Referee: Heinz Aldinger

1 May 1971 29	Bayern Munich	4–2	Rot-Weiß Oberhausen	Munich
15:30 CET	Mrosko 19'; Müller 55', 88'; Beckenbauer 62'	Report	Kobluhn 77'; Sühnholz 84'	Stadium: Grünwalder Stadion; Attendance: 13,000; Referee: Heinz Quindeau

8 May 1971 30	Schalke 04	1–3	Bayern Munich	Gelsenkirchen
15:30 CET	Fischer 12'	Report	Brenninger 41'; Mrosko 48'; Müller 72'	Stadium: Glückauf-Kampfbahn; Attendance: 30,000; Referee: Diedrich Basedow

15 May 1971 31	Bayern Munich	7–0	1. FC Köln	Munich
15:30 CET	Thielen 21' (o.g.); Breitner 41'; Schneider 51', 72'; Hoeneß 78'; Müller 81'; Mrosko 84'	Report		Stadium: Grünwalder Stadion; Attendance: 28,000; Referee: Elmar Schäfer

22 May 1971 32	Werder Bremen	0–1	Bayern Munich	Bremen
15:30 CET		Report	Breitner 52'	Stadium: Weserstadion; Attendance: 40,000; Referee: Paul Kindervater

29 May 1971 33	Bayern Munich	4–1	Eintracht Braunschweig	Munich
15:30 CET	Beckenbauer 6'; Zobel 43'; Brenninger 51'; Hoeneß 85'	Report	Ulsaß 65'	Stadium: Grünwalder Stadion; Attendance: 24,000; Referee: Gerd Hennig

5 June 1971 34	MSV Duisburg	2–0	Bayern Munich	Duisburg
15:30 CET	Heidemann (penalty missed) 12'; Budde 55', 69'	Report		Stadium: Wedaustadion; Attendance: 34,000; Referee: Horst Herden

==== League standings ====
Pos	Team	Pld	W	D	L	GF	GA	GD	Pts	Qualification or relegation
1	Borussia Mönchengladbach (C)	34	20	10	4	77	35	+42	50	Qualification to European Cup first round
2	Bayern Munich	34	19	10	5	74	36	+38	48	Qualification to Cup Winners' Cup first round
3	Hertha BSC	34	16	9	9	61	43	+18	41	Qualification to UEFA Cup first round
4	Eintracht Braunschweig	34	16	7	11	52	40	+12	39	Qualification to UEFA Cup first round
5	Hamburger SV	34	13	11	10	54	63	−9	37	Qualification to UEFA Cup first round

Source: www.dfb.de
Rules for classification: 1) points; 2) goal difference; 3) number of goals scored.
(C) Champions

=== DFB-Pokal ===
13 December 1970 1st Round	KSV Hessen Kassel	2–2 (a.e.t.)	Bayern Munich	Kassel
14:00 CET	Adler 20'; Maciossek 25'	Report	Müller 23', 39'	Stadium: Auestadion; Attendance: 34,000; Referee: Gerhard Schulenburg

23 December 1970 1st Round Replay	Bayern Munich	3–0	KSV Hessen Kassel	Munich
20:00 CET	Roth 23', 33'; Dittel 44' (o.g.)	Report		Stadium: Grünwalder Stadion; Attendance: 6,500; Referee: Walter Engel

20 February 1971 Round of 16	1. FC Kaiserslautern	1–1 (a.e.t.)	Bayern Munich	Kaiserslautern
15:30 CET	Koppenhöfer 60' (o.g.)	Report	Müller 55'	Stadium: Betzenbergstadion; Attendance: 30,000; Referee: Hans Voss

30 March 1971 Round of 16 Replay	Bayern Munich	5–0	1. FC Kaiserslautern	Munich
20:00 CET	Müller 18', 23', 55', 72', 86'	Report		Stadium: Grünwalder Stadion; Attendance: 11,500; Referee: Klaus Ohmsen

7 April 1971 Quarterfinals	Bayern Munich	4–0	MSV Duisburg	Munich
20:00 CET	Zobel 40'; Mrosko 75'; Müller 85'; Roth 89'	Report		Stadium: Grünwalder Stadion; Attendance: 16,000; Referee: Jan Redelfs

12 May 1971 Semifinals	Fortuna Düsseldorf	0–1	Bayern Munich	Düsseldorf
20:00 CET		Report	Müller 55'	Stadium: Flinger Broich; Attendance: 26,000; Referee: Ferdinand Biwersi

19 June 1971 Final	Bayern Munich	2–1 (a.e.t.)	1. FC Köln	Stuttgart
16:00 CET	Beckenbauer 52'; Schneider 118'; Koppenhöfer (red card) 72'	Report	Rupp 14'	Stadium: Neckarstadion; Attendance: 71,000; Referee: Ferdinand Biwersi

=== Inter-Cities Fairs Cup ===
16 September 1970 1st Round	Bayern Munich	1–0	(Scotland) Rangers	Munich
CET	Beckenbauer 21'	Report		Stadium: Grünwalder Stadion; Attendance: 30,000

30 September 1970 1st Round	Rangers (Scotland)	1–1 (1–2 agg.)	Bayern Munich	Glasgow, Scotland
CET	Stein 81'	Report	Müller 80'	Stadium: Ibrox Stadium; Attendance: 82,743

20 October 1970 2nd Round	Bayern Munich	6–1	(England) Coventry City	Munich
CET	Schneider 3', 12'; Schwarzenbeck 16'; Müller 18', 88'; Roth 73'	Report	Hunt 9'	Stadium: Grünwalder Stadion; Attendance: 8,000; Referee: Francesconi (Italy)

3 November 1970 2nd Round	Coventry City (England)	2–1 (3–7 agg.)	Bayern Munich	Coventry, England
CET	Martin 35'; O'Rourke 88'	Report	Hoeneß 64'	Stadium: Highfield Road; Attendance: 26,000; Referee: Rios (Spain)

25 November 1970 Round of 16	Bayern Munich	2–1	(Netherlands) Sparta Rotterdam	Munich
CET	Schneider 55'; Müller 87'	Report	Heijerman 23'	Stadium: Grünwalder Stadion; Attendance: 11,000; Referee: Rosa Dias Nunes (Portugal)

9 December 1970 Round of 16	Sparta Rotterdam (Netherlands)	1–3 (2=5 agg.)	Bayern Munich	Rotterdam, Netherlands
CET	Kristensen 32'	Report	Müller 23', 40', 66'	Stadium: De Kuip; Attendance: 45,000

10 March 1971 Quarterfinals	Liverpool (England)	3–0	Bayern Munich	Liverpool, England
CET	Evans 30', 50', 73'	Report		Stadium: Anfield; Attendance: 45,000; Referee: Geluck (Belgium)

24 March 1971 Quarterfinals	Bayern Munich	1–1 (1–4 agg.)	(England) Liverpool	Munich
CET	Schneider 77'	Report	Ross 75'	Stadium: Grünwalder Stadion; Attendance: 22,000; Referee: Robert Wurtz (France)
