= 1971–72 FC Bayern Munich season =

7th season of Bayern Munich in the Bundesliga

Bayern Munich
1971–72 season
- Chairman: Wilhelm Neudecker
- Manager: Udo Lattek
- Stadium: Grünwalder Stadion; Olympiastadion
- Bundesliga: 1st (champions)
- DFB-Pokal: Quarter-finals
- European Cup Winners' Cup: Semi-finals
- Top goalscorer: League: Gerd Müller (40); All: Gerd Müller (50)

The 1971–72 FC Bayern Munich season was the club's seventh season in Bundesliga.

== Team kit ==
Home	Away	Away 2	Away 3

== Squad ==
Note: Flags indicate national team as defined under FIFA eligibility rules; some limited exceptions apply. Players may hold more than one non-FIFA nationality.

No.	Pos.	Nation	Player
—	GK	GER	Sepp Maier
—	GK	GER	Manfred Seifert
—	GK	GER	Helmut Schwalb
—	DF	DEN	Johnny Hansen
—	DF	GER	Paul Breitner
—	DF	GER	Franz Beckenbauer
—	DF	GER	Hans-Georg Schwarzenbeck
—	DF	GER	Herward Koppenhöfer
—	DF	GER	Günther Rybarczyk
—	MF	GER	Franz Roth

No.	Pos.	Nation	Player
—	MF	GER	Rainer Zobel
—	MF	GER	Herbert Schröder
—	MF	GER	Wolfgang Sühnholz
—	FW	GER	Gerd Müller
—	FW	GER	Uli Hoeneß
—	FW	GER	Franz Krauthausen
—	FW	GER	Edgar Schneider
—	FW	GER	Wilhelm Hoffmann
—	FW	GER	Franz Gerber

== Match results ==
=== Legend ===
Win Draw Loss

=== Bundesliga ===
==== League fixtures and results ====
14 August 1971 1	Bayern Munich	3–1	Fortuna Düsseldorf	Munich
15:30 CET	Krauthausen 30'; Breitner 72'; Beckenbauer 84'	Report	Schulz 17'	Stadium: Grünwalder Stadion; Attendance: 28,000; Referee: Jan Redelfs

21 August 1971 2	Hertha BSC	2–2	Bayern Munich	Berlin
15:30 CET	Steffenhagen 24'; Varga 69'	Report	Hoeneß 47'; Müller 73'	Stadium: Olympic Stadium; Attendance: 72,000; Referee: Gerhard Schulenburg

28 August 1971 3	Bayern Munich	4–1	Eintracht Braunschweig	Munich
15:30 CET	Hansen 19'; Zobel 75'; Beckenbauer 78', 81'	Report	Gerwien 10'	Stadium: Grünwalder Stadion; Attendance: 23,000; Referee: Ferdinand Biwersi

31 August 1971 4	Rot-Weiß Oberhausen	1–1	Bayern Munich	Oberhausen
20:00 CET	Hollmann 19'	Report	Hansen 82'	Stadium: Niederrheinstadion; Attendance: 30,000; Referee: Jürgen Schumann

3 September 1971 5	Bayern Munich	2–0	Borussia Mönchengladbach	Munich
20:00 CET	Roth 27'; Hoeneß 31'	Report		Stadium: Grünwalder Stadion; Attendance: 40,000; Referee: Klaus Ohmsen

11 September 1971 6	1. FC Kaiserslautern	0–2	Bayern Munich	Kaiserslautern
15:30 CET		Report	Zobel 68'; Müller 86'	Stadium: Betzenbergstadion; Attendance: 30,000; Referee: Diedrich Basedow

18 September 1971 7	Bayern Munich	1–1	Arminia Bielefeld	Munich
15:30 CET	Müller 7'	Report	Brücken 7'	Stadium: Grünwalder Stadion; Attendance: 21,000; Referee: Franz-Josef Hontheim

25 September 1971 8	VfL Bochum	0–2	Bayern Munich	Bochum
15:30 CET		Report	Hoeneß 38'; Hansen 67'	Stadium: Stadion an der Castroper Straße; Attendance: 27,000; Referee: Walter Horstmann

2 October 1971 9	Bayern Munich	2–2	VfB Stuttgart	Munich
15:30 CET	Sühnholz 53'; Roth 65'	Report	Handschuh 35'; Frank 49'	Stadium: Grünwalder Stadion; Attendance: 43,000; Referee: Gerd Hennig

13 October 1971 10	Werder Bremen	1–2	Bayern Munich	Bremen
20:00 CET	Kamp 31'	Report	Müller 43'; Hoeneß 61'	Stadium: Weserstadion; Attendance: 40,000; Referee: Paul Kindervater

16 October 1971 11	Hannover 96	1–3	Bayern Munich	Hannover
15:30 CET	Keller 28'	Report	Müller 9', 78'; Hoffmann 51'	Stadium: Niedersachsenstadion; Attendance: 36,000; Referee: Peter Gabor

23 October 1971 12	Bayern Munich	5–1	MSV Duisburg	Munich
15:30 CET	Müller 27', 29'; Roth 42' (pen.), 59' (pen.); Breitner 51'	Report	Lehmann 34' (pen.)	Stadium: Grünwalder Stadion; Attendance: 24,000; Referee: Diedrich Basedow

30 October 1971 13	Hamburger SV	1–4	Bayern Munich	Hamburg
15:30 CET	Zaczyk 86'	Report	Müller 50', 53', 61'; Roth 85'	Stadium: Volksparkstadion; Attendance: 62,000; Referee: Hans-Joachim Weyland

6 November 1971 14	Bayern Munich	1–1	1. FC Köln	Munich
15:30 CET	Hoeneß 86'	Report	Kapellmann 42'	Stadium: Grünwalder Stadion; Attendance: 37,000; Referee: Rudolf Schröck

13 November 1971 15	Eintracht Frankfurt	3–2	Bayern Munich	Frankfurt
15:30 CET	Parits 3'; Hölzenbein 61'; Lutz 70'	Report	Müller 56', 58'	Stadium: Waldstadion; Attendance: 64,000; Referee: Klaus Ohmsen

27 November 1971 16	Bayern Munich	11–1	Borussia Dortmund	Munich
15:30 CET	Müller 11', 45', 83', 90'; Hoeneß 20', 49'; Hoffmann 39'; Beckenbauer 54'; Breitner 59'; Roth 64', 89'	Report	Weinkauff 57'	Stadium: Grünwalder Stadion; Attendance: 17,000; Referee: Gert Meuser

11 December 1971 17	Schalke 04	1–0	Bayern Munich	Gelsenkirchen
15:30 CET	van Haaren 77'	Report		Stadium: Glückauf-Kampfbahn; Attendance: 38,500; Referee: Ferdinand Biwersi

22 January 1972 18	Fortuna Düsseldorf	0–1	Bayern Munich	Düsseldorf
15:30 CET		Report	Müller 70'	Stadium: Flinger Broich; Attendance: 45,000; Referee: Klaus Ohmsen

29 January 1972 19	Bayern Munich	1–0	Hertha BSC	Munich
15:30 CET	Schneider 53'	Report		Stadium: Grünwalder Stadion; Attendance: 15,000; Referee: Horst Herden

5 February 1972 20	Eintracht Braunschweig	1–1	Bayern Munich	Braunschweig
15:30 CET	Bäse 51'	Report	Haun 48.o.g'	Stadium: Eintracht-Stadion; Attendance: 14,000; Referee: Paul Kindervater

19 February 1972 21	Bayern Munich	7–0	Rot-Weiß Oberhausen	Munich
15:30 CET	Müller 38', 51', 54', 77', 82'; Sühnholz 41'; Krauthausen 88'	Report		Stadium: Grünwalder Stadion; Attendance: 19,000; Referee: Heinz Quindeau

26 February 1972 22	Borussia Mönchengladbach	2–2	Bayern Munich	Mönchengladbach
15:30 CET	Heynckes 4', 20'	Report	Schneider 23'; Roth 47'	Stadium: Bökelbergstadion; Attendance: 30,000; Referee: Gerhard Schulenburg

4 March 1972 23	Bayern Munich	3–1	1. FC Kaiserslautern	Munich
15:30 CET	Müller 55', 77'; Roth 57'	Report	Ackermann 43'	Stadium: Grünwalder Stadion; Attendance: 22,000; Referee: Alfred Köhler

11 March 1972 24	Arminia Bielefeld	0–1	Bayern Munich	Bielefeld
15:30 CET		Report	Müller 63'	Stadium: Bielefelder Alm; Attendance: 30,000; Referee: Jan Redelfs

18 March 1972 25	Bayern Munich	5–1	VfL Bochum	Munich
15:30 CET	Krauthausen 6'; Müller 36', 56', 87' Fechner 90' (o.g.)	Report	Hartl 45'	Stadium: Grünwalder Stadion; Attendance: 20,000; Referee: Ferdinand Biwersi

25 March 1972 26	VfB Stuttgart	1–4	Bayern Munich	Stuttgart
15:30 CET	Frank 40'	Report	Müller 15', 58'; Sühnholz 52'; Hoeneß 87'	Stadium: Neckarstadion; Attendance: 45,000; Referee: Rudolf Schröck

8 April 1972 27	Bayern Munich	6–2	Werder Bremen	Munich
15:30 CET	Müller 3', 21', 76'; Krauthausen 19'; Sühnholz 30'; Hoeneß 84'	Report	Schmidt 15'; Weber 24' (pen.)	Stadium: Grünwalder Stadion; Attendance: 15,000; Referee: Wilfried Hilker

15 April 1972 28	Bayern Munich	3–1	Hannover 96	Munich
15:30 CET	Hoeneß 22', 86'; Roth 44'	Report	Keller 35' (pen.)	Stadium: Grünwalder Stadion; Attendance: 18,000; Referee: Gert Meuser

22 April 1972 29	MSV Duisburg	3–0	Bayern Munich	Duisburg
15:30 CET	Worm 71', 88'; Lehmann 84'	Report		Stadium: Wedaustadion; Attendance: 30,000; Referee: Elmar Schäfer

6 May 1972 30	Bayern Munich	4–3	Hamburger SV	Munich
15:30 CET	Müller 4', 41'; Hoeneß 12'; Roth 90' (pen.)	Report	Kaltz 24'; Hönig 36'; Winkler 55'	Stadium: Grünwalder Stadion; Attendance: 22,000; Referee: Paul Kindervater

20 May 1972 31	1. FC Köln	1–4	Bayern Munich	Cologne
15:30 CET	Rupp 65'	Report	Schwarzenbeck 20'; Müller 41'; Kapellmann 63' (o.g.); Roth 83' (pen.)	Stadium: Müngersdorfer Stadion; Attendance: 27,000; Referee: Gerhard Schulenburg

3 June 1972 32	Bayern Munich	6–3	Eintracht Frankfurt	Munich
15:30 CET	Zobel 7', 72'; Beckenbauer 24'; Müller 47', 68', 79'	Report	Parits 32'; Grabowski 55'; Hölzenbein 56'	Stadium: Grünwalder Stadion; Attendance: 28,000; Referee: Philipp Geng

24 June 1972 33	Borussia Dortmund	0–1	Bayern Munich	Dortmund
15:30 CET		Report	Krauthausen 4'	Stadium: Stadion Rote Erde; Attendance: 26,000; Referee: Peter Gabor

28 June 1972 34	Bayern Munich	5–1	Schalke 04	Munich
20:00 CET	Hansen 31'; Breitner 40'; Hoffmann 69'; Hoeneß 80'; Beckenbauer 90'	Report	Fischer 56'	Stadium: Olympic Stadium; Attendance: 79,012; Referee: Walter Horstmann

==== League table ====
Pos	Team	Pld	W	D	L	GF	GA	GD	Pts	Qualification or relegation
1	Bayern Munich (C)	34	24	7	3	101	38	+63	55	Qualification to European Cup first round
2	Schalke 04	34	24	4	6	76	35	+41	52	Qualification to Cup Winners' Cup first round
3	Borussia Mönchengladbach	34	18	7	9	82	40	+42	43	Qualification to UEFA Cup first round
4	1. FC Köln	34	15	13	6	64	44	+20	43	Qualification to UEFA Cup first round
5	Eintracht Frankfurt	34	16	7	11	71	61	+10	39	Qualification to UEFA Cup first round

Source: www.dfb.de
Rules for classification: 1) points; 2) goal difference; 3) number of goals scored.
(C) Champions

=== DFB-Pokal ===
4 December 1971 1st Round	Fortuna Köln	2–1	Bayern Munich	Cologne
15:30 CET	Glock 61'; Bauerkämper 63'	Report	Hoeneß 41'	Stadium: Radrennbahn; Attendance: 18,000; Referee: Elmar Schäfer

15 December 1971 1st Round	Bayern Munich	6–0 (7–2 agg.)	Fortuna Köln	Munich
	Sühnholz 5'; Hoeneß 28', 89'; Schneider 48'; Müller 53', 75'	Report		Stadium: Grünwalder Stadion; Attendance: 28,000; Referee: Walter Engel

12 February 1972 Round of 16	Eintracht Braunschweig	0–0	Bayern Munich	Braunschweig
15:30 CET		Report		Stadium: Eintracht-Stadion; Attendance: 13,000; Referee: Peter Gabor

23 February 1972 Round of 16	Bayern Munich	3–1 (a.e.t.) (3–1 agg.)	Eintracht Braunschweig	Munich
20:00 CET	Roth 110'; Grzyb 70' (o.g.); Beckenbauer 114'	Report	Grzyb 52'	Stadium: Grünwalder Stadion; Attendance: 17,000; Referee: Günter Linn

1 April 1972 Quarterfinals	Bayern Munich	3–0	1. FC Köln	Munich
15:30 CET	Roth 30'; Müller 59', 85'	Report		Stadium: Grünwalder Stadion; Attendance: 20,000; Referee: Walter Horstmann

12 April 1972 Quarterfinals	1. FC Köln	5–1 (5–4 agg.)	Bayern Munich	Cologne
	Löhr 19' (pen.); Rupp 50', 69'; Schwarzenbeck 49' (o.g.); Glowacz 52'	Report	Müller 54'	Stadium: Radrennbahn; Attendance: 27,000; Referee: Klaus Ohmsen

=== European Cup Winners' Cup ===
15 September 1971 1st Round	(Czechoslovakia) FC Viktoria Plzeň	0–1	(Germany) Bayern Munich	Plzeň, Czechoslovakia
		Report	Sühnholz 76'	Stadium: Štruncovy Sady; Attendance: 30,000; Referee: Xanthoullis (Cyprus)

29 September 1971 1st Round	(Germany) Bayern Munich	6–1 (7–1 agg.)	(Czechoslovakia) FC Viktoria Plzeň	Munich
	Müller 1', 74' (pen.); Krauthausen 17'; Hoffmann 50', 80'; Roth 87'	Report	Bican 4'	Stadium: Grünwalder Stadion; Attendance: 6,000; Referee: Christos Michas (Greece)

20 October 1971 Round of 16	(England) Liverpool	0–0	(Germany) Bayern Munich	Liverpool, England
		Report		Stadium: Anfield; Attendance: 42,900; Referee: Gonella (Italy)

3 November 1971 Round of 16	(Germany) Bayern Munich	3–1 (3–1 agg.)	(England) Liverpool	Munich
	Müller 25', 27'; Hoeneß 57'	Report	Evans 38'	Stadium: Grünwalder Stadion; Attendance: 40,000; Referee: Kasakow (Soviet Union)

8 March 1972 Quarterfinals	(Romania) Steaua București	1–1	(Germany) Bayern Munich	Bucharest, Romania
	Tătaru 18'	Report	Müller 69'	Stadium: Stadionul Steaua; Attendance: 35,000; Referee: Boogarts (Netherlands)

22 March 1972 Quarterfinals	(Germany) Bayern Munich	0–0 (1a–1 agg.)	(Romania) Steaua București	Munich
CET		Report		Stadium: Grünwalder Stadion; Attendance: 40,000; Referee: Krnavek (Czechoslovakia)

5 April 1972 Semifinals	(Germany) Bayern Munich	1–1	(Scotland) Rangers	Munich
CET	Breitner 21'	Report	Zobel 47' (o.g.)	Stadium: Grünwalder Stadion; Attendance: 40,000; Referee: Radountschew (Bulgaria)

19 April 1972 Semifinals	(Scotland) Rangers	2–0 (3–1 agg.)	(Germany) Bayern Munich	Glasgow, Scotland
CET	Jardine 1'; Parlane 22'	Report		Stadium: Ibrox Stadium; Attendance: 80,000; Referee: Francesconi (Italy)
