= List of FC Bayern Munich players =

List of players who have played 40 or more games in the Bundesliga

Below is a list of FC Bayern Munich players who have played 40 or more games in the Bundesliga for Bayern Munich. For all Bayern Munich players with an article, see Category:FC Bayern Munich footballers, and for the current squad see the main club article.

== List of players ==
Appearances and goals are up to date as of 16 May 2026.

Spent their entire professional career with Bayern Munich.
Part of the Bayern Munich hall of fame.

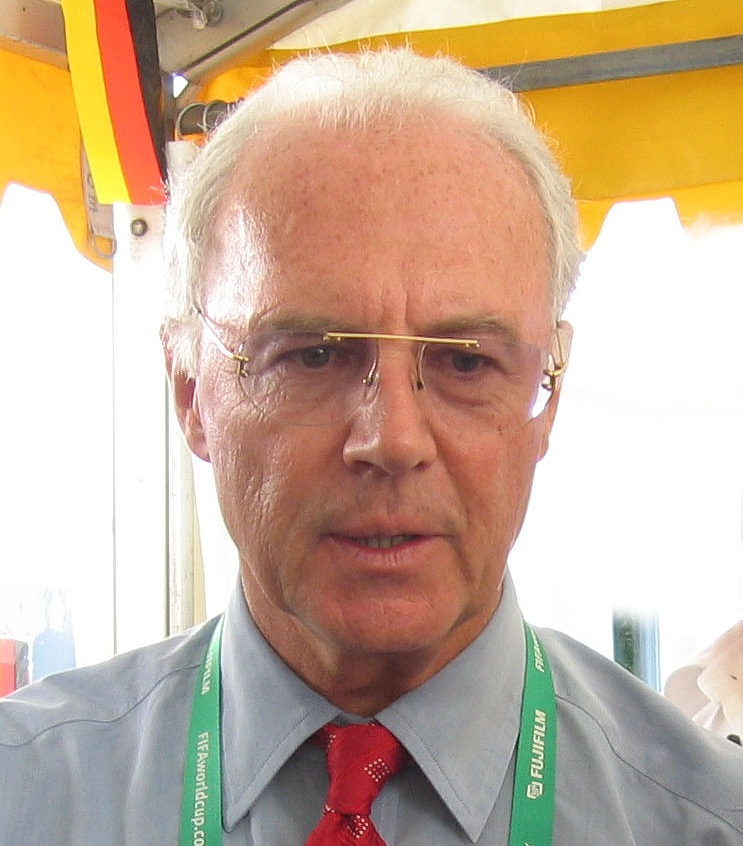
Franz Beckenbauer was the captain of Bayern's successful side of the 1970s

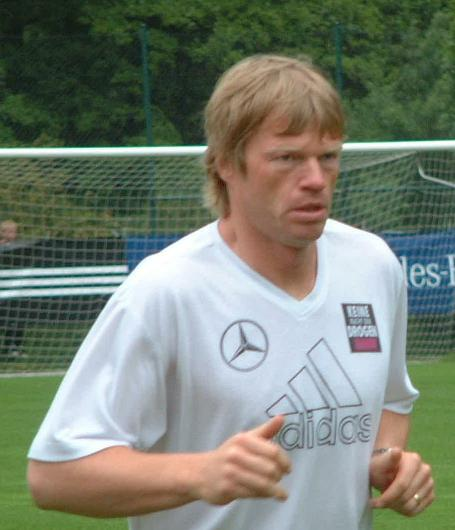
Oliver Kahn was Bayern's goalkeeper from 1994 to 2008, and captain from 2002

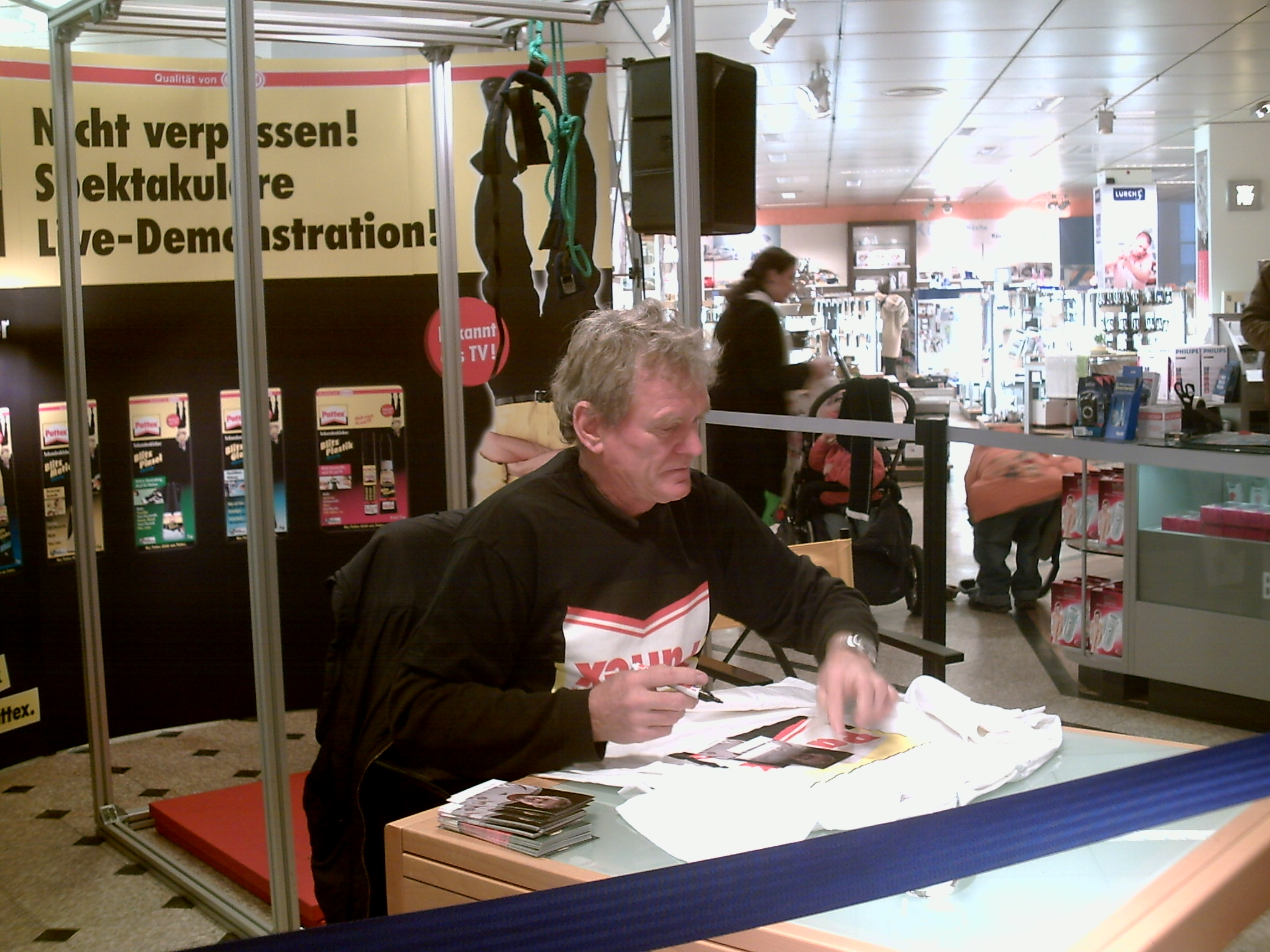
Goalkeeper Sepp Maier made 473 Bundesliga appearances between 1962 and 1980

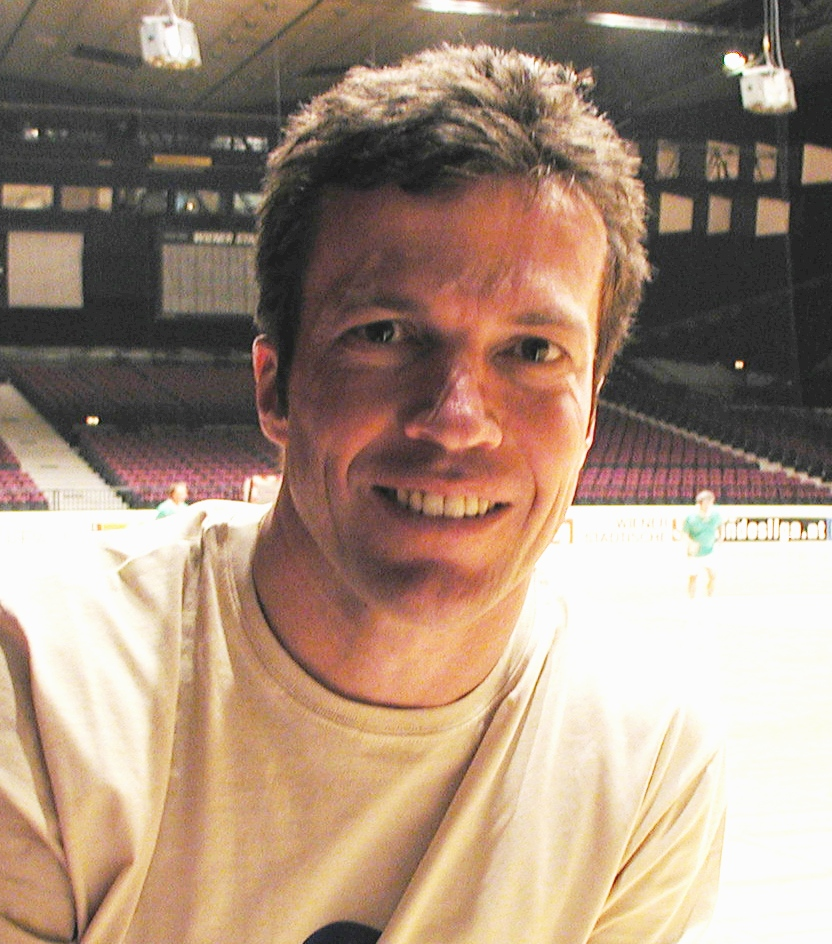
Lothar Matthäus was a star player in two separate spells for Bayern, as a midfielder and later as a sweeper

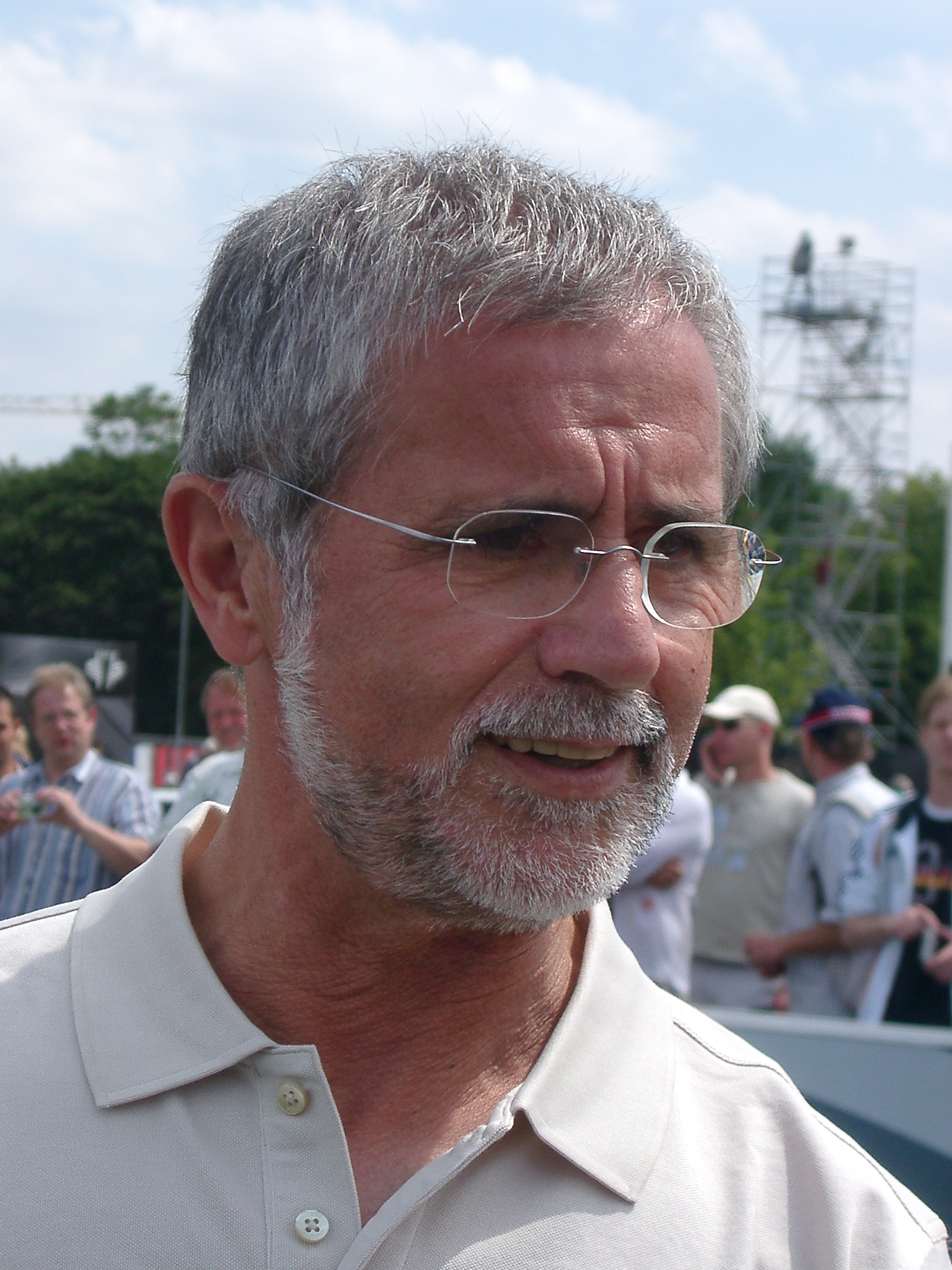
Gerd Müller's 365 goals in 427 games is a Bundesliga record

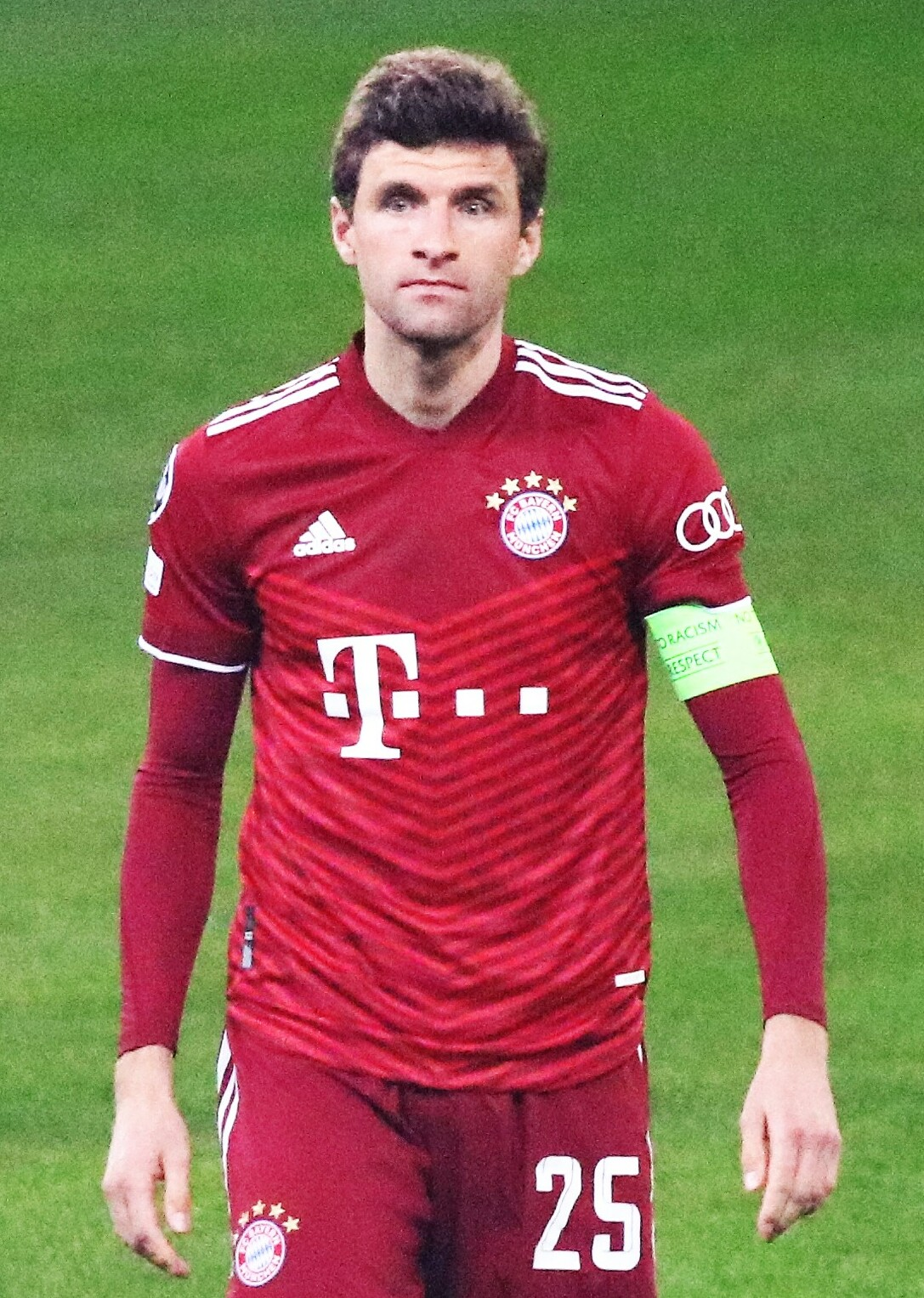
Thomas Müller is the player with the most Bundesliga appearances for Bayern Munich

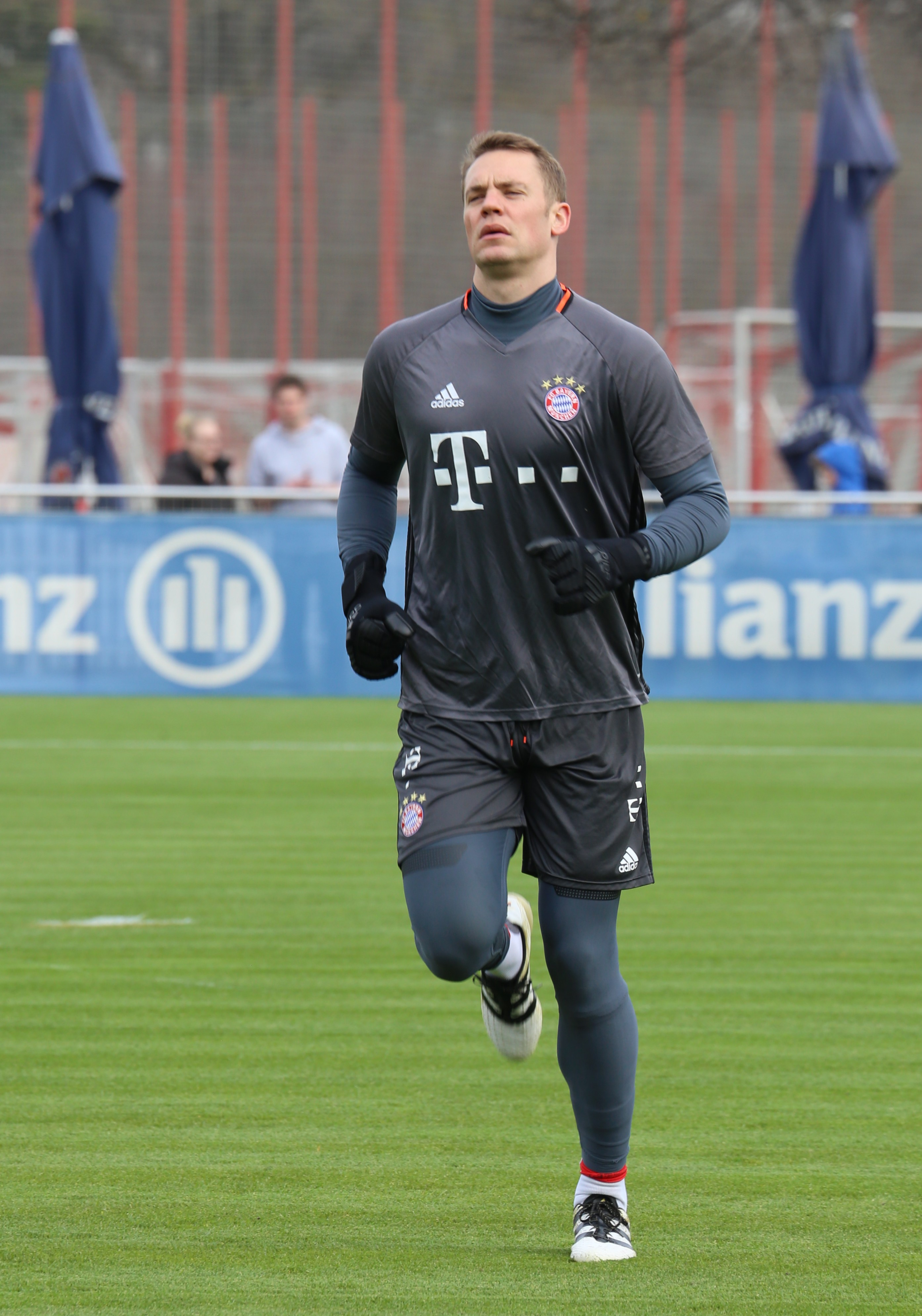
Manuel Neuer is the current captain of Bayern Munich since 2017. He won IFFHS World's Best Goalkeeper award five times, of which four were consecutive. (2013, 2014, 2015, 2016 and 2020)

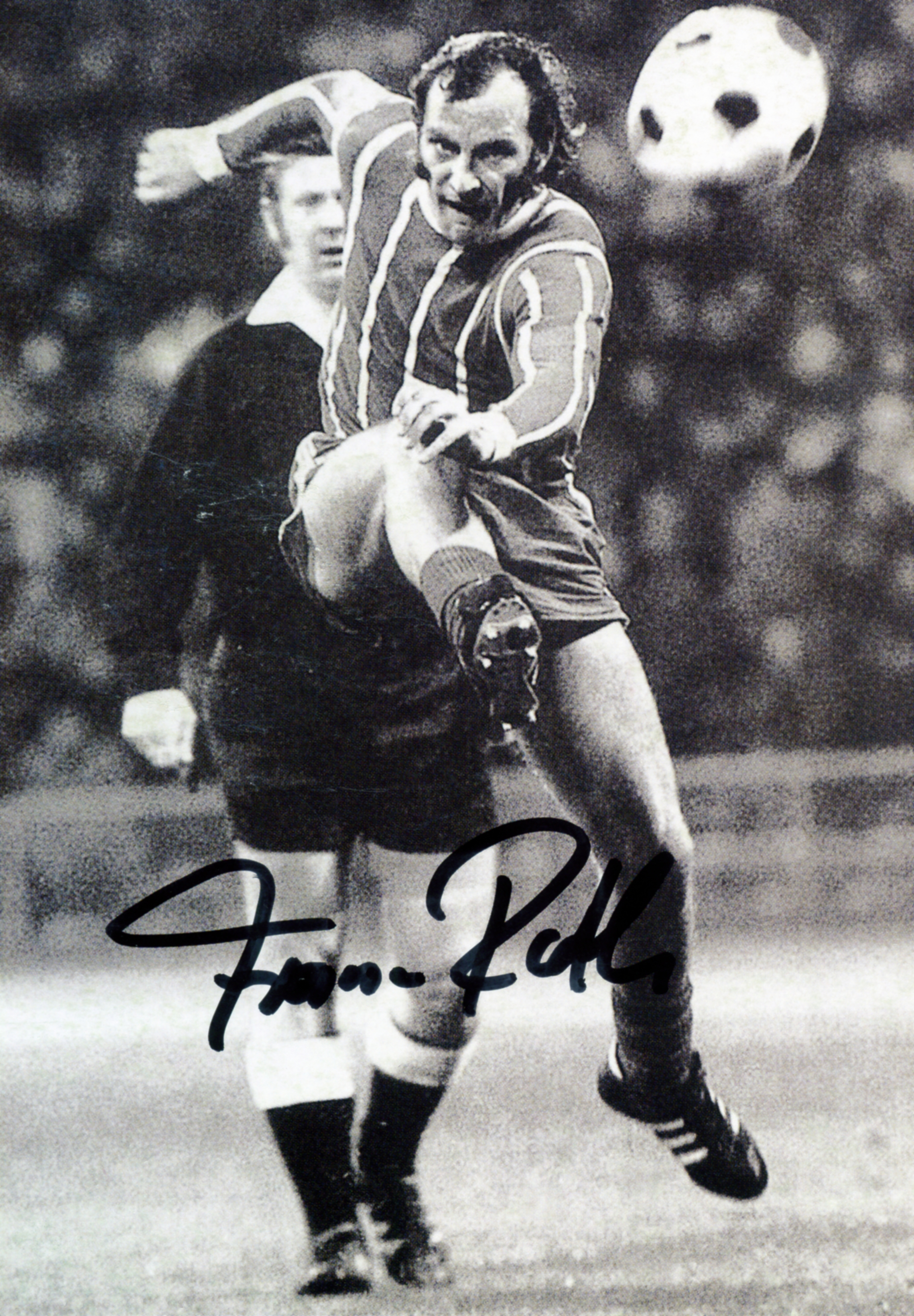
Franz Roth made 322 Bundesliga appearances, and scored in three European finals

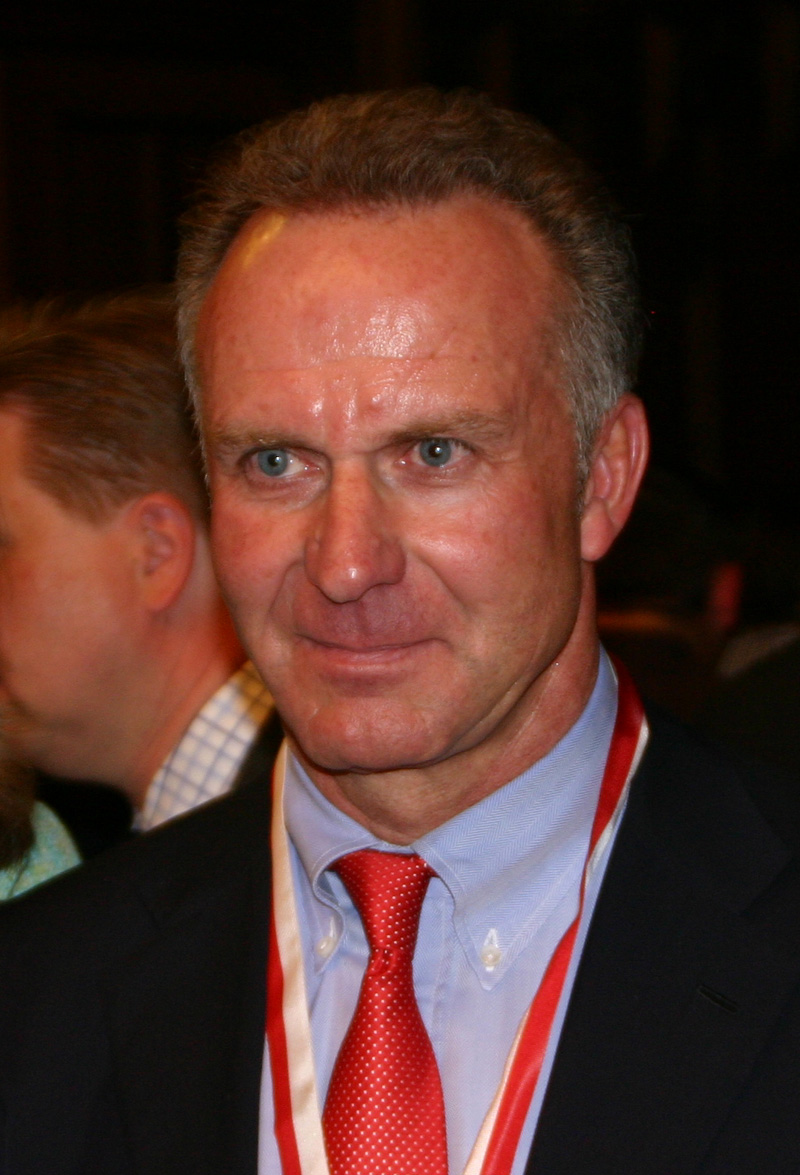
Karl-Heinz Rummenigge made 310 appearances for Bayern between 1974 and 1984

Player	Position	Nationality	Bayern career	League apps	League goals	Notes
David Alaba	Defender	Austria	2010–2021	281	22	
Xabi Alonso	Midfielder	Spain	2014–2017	79	5	
Hamit Altıntop	Midfielder	Turkey	2007–2011	63	7	
Björn Andersson	Defender	Sweden	1974–1977	47	1	
Klaus Augenthaler	Defender	Germany	1976–1991	404	52	Captain from 1984–1991.
Raimond Aumann	Goalkeeper	Germany	1982–1994	216	0	Captain from 1991–1994.
Markus Babbel	Defender	Germany	1991–2000	182	5	
Holger Badstuber	Defender	Germany	2009–2017	119	1	
Michael Ballack	Midfielder	Germany	2002–2006	107	44	
Mario Basler	Midfielder	Germany	1996–1999	78	18	
Franz Beckenbauer	Defender	West Germany	1963–1977	396	44	Captain from 1970–1977. President from 1994–2009. Coach during 1994 and 1996.
Bertram Beierlorzer	Defender	West Germany	1981–1986	73	0	
Manfred Bender	Midfielder	Germany	1989–1992	77	9	
Juan Bernat	Midfielder	Spain	2014–2018	76	3	
Jérôme Boateng	Defender	Germany	2011–2021	229	5	
Mark van Bommel	Midfielder	Netherlands	2006–2011	123	11	Captain from 2008–2011
Andreas Brehme	Defender	West Germany	1986–1988	59	7	
Paul Breitner	Midfielder	West Germany	1970–1974; 1978–1983	255	83	Captain from 1980–1983
Dieter Brenninger	Forward	West Germany	1962–1971	190	59	
Hans-Jörg Butt	Goalkeeper	Germany	2008–2012	63	0	
Eric Maxim Choupo-Moting	Forward	Cameroon	2020–2024	88	19	
Kingsley Coman	Midfielder	France	2015–2025	227	46	
Diego Contento	Defender	Germany	2010–2014	49	0	
Douglas Costa	Forward	Brazil	2015–2018	50	8	
Dante	Defender	Brazil	2012–2015	86	3	
Alphonso Davies	Defender	Canada	2019–	167	10	
Sebastian Deisler	Midfielder	Germany	2002–2007	62	8	
Kalle Del'Haye	Forward	West Germany	1980–1985	74	7	
Martín Demichelis	Defender	Argentina	2003–2011	174	13	
Hans Dorfner	Midfielder	Germany	1983–1991	111	17	
Wolfgang Dremmler	Defender	West Germany	1979–1986	172	6	
Bernd Dürnberger	Midfielder	West Germany	1972–1985	375	38	
Stefan Effenberg	Midfielder	Germany	1990–1992; 1998–2002	160	35	Captain from 1999–2002.
Norbert Eder	Defender	West Germany	1984–1988	132	6	
Giovane Élber	Forward	Brazil	1997–2003	169	92	
Thorsten Fink	Midfielder	Germany	1997–2004	122	4	
Hansi Flick	Midfielder	West Germany	1985–1990	104	5	Coach from 2019–2021.
Serge Gnabry	Midfielder	Germany	2017–	214	78	
Mario Gómez	Forward	Germany	2009–2013	115	75	
Leon Goretzka	Midfielder	Germany	2018–2026	211	40	
Mario Götze	Midfielder	Germany	2013–2016	73	22	
Roland Grahammer	Defender	Germany	1988–1994	102	2	
Wolfgang Grobe	Midfielder	West Germany	1982–1986	58	10	
Peter Gruber	Defender	West Germany	1976–1980	41	2	
Raphaël Guerreiro	Defender	Portugal	2023–2026	61	12	
Luiz Gustavo	Midfielder	Brazil	2011–2013	64	6	
Dietmar Hamann	Midfielder	Germany	1993–1998	106	6	
Johnny Hansen	Defender	Denmark	1970–1976	164	7	
Owen Hargreaves	Midfielder	England	2000–2007	145	5	
Thomas Helmer	Defender	Germany	1992–1999	191	24	Captain from 1997–1999.
Lucas Hernandez	Defender	France	2019–2023	74	0	
Dieter Hoeneß	Forward	West Germany	1979–1987	224	102	
Uli Hoeneß	Midfielder	West Germany	1970–1979	239	86	General Manager from 1979–2009; President from 2009–2014 and 2016–2019.
Wilhelm Hoffmann	Forward	West Germany	1971–1974	55	14	
Udo Horsmann	Defender	West Germany	1975–1983	242	20	
Mats Hummels	Defender	Germany	2007–2009; 2016–2019	75	3	
Carsten Jancker	Forward	Germany	1996–2002	143	48	
Norbert Janzon	Forward	West Germany	1977–1981	84	20	
Jens Jeremies	Midfielder	Germany	1998–2006	163	6	
Jorginho	Defender	Brazil	1992–1995	67	6	
Walter Junghans	Goalkeeper	West Germany	1977–1982	67	0	
Oliver Kahn	Goalkeeper	Germany	1994–2008	429	0	Captain from 2002–2008; Honorary captain.
Harry Kane	Forward	England	2023–	98	101	
Jupp Kapellmann	Midfielder	West Germany	1973–1979	165	17	
Kim Min-jae	Defender	South Korea	2023–	77	4	
Joshua Kimmich	Defender	Germany	2015–	324	31	
Jürgen Klinsmann	Forward	Germany	1995–1997	65	31	Coach from 2008–2009.
Miroslav Klose	Forward	Germany	2007–2011	98	24	
Ludwig Kögl	Midfielder	West Germany	1984–1990	149	8	
Jürgen Kohler	Defender	Germany	1989–1991	55	6	
Herwart Koppenhöfer	Defender	West Germany	1969–1972	71	0	
Dieter Koulmann	Midfielder	West Germany	1963–1968	99	15	
Robert Kovač	Defender	Croatia	2001–2005	100	0	
Wolfgang Kraus	Midfielder	West Germany	1979–1984	138	17	
Franz Krauthausen	Midfielder	West Germany	1971–1973	57	9	
Oliver Kreuzer	Defender	Germany	1991–1997	153	8	
Toni Kroos	Midfielder	Germany	2007–2014	130	13	
Samuel Osei Kuffour	Defender	Ghana	1994–2005	175	7	
Peter Kupferschmidt	Defender	West Germany	1960–1971	135	4	
Bruno Labbadia	Forward	Germany	1991–1994	82	28	
Philipp Lahm	Defender	Germany	2002–2017	332	12	Captain from 2011–2017.
Konrad Laimer	Midfielder	Austria	2023–	87	5	
Brian Laudrup	Forward	Denmark	1990–1992	53	11	
Christian Lell	Defender	Germany	2003–2010	65	1	
Søren Lerby	Midfielder	Denmark	1983–1986	89	22	Coach from 1991–1992.
Robert Lewandowski	Forward	Poland	2014–2022	253	238	
Matthijs de Ligt	Defender	Netherlands	2022–2024	53	5	
Thomas Linke	Defender	Germany	1998–2005	165	2	
Bixente Lizarazu	Defender	France	1997–2004; 2005–2006	182	7	
Lúcio	Defender	Brazil	2004–2009	145	7	
Sepp Maier	Goalkeeper	West Germany	1962–1980	473	0	Captain from 1977–1979.
Roy Makaay	Forward	Netherlands	2003–2007	129	78	
Mario Mandžukić	Forward	Croatia	2012–2014	54	33	
Javi Martínez	Midfielder	Spain	2012–2021	165	9	
Reinhold Mathy	Forward	West Germany	1980–1987	100	21	
Lothar Matthäus	Midfielder	Germany	1984–1988; 1992–2000	302	85	Captain from 1994–1997.
Mazinho	Forward	Brazil	1991–1994	49	11	
Alan McInally	Forward	Scotland	1989–1992	40	10	
Karl-Heinz Mrosko	Forward	West Germany	1969–1971	50	13	
Gerd Müller	Forward	West Germany	1964–1979	427	365	Captain during 1979.
Manfred Müller	Goalkeeper	West Germany	1980–1984	43	0	
Thomas Müller	Forward	Germany	2008–2025	503	150	
Markus Münch	Defender	Germany	1990–1997	49	0	
Jamal Musiala	Midfielder	Germany	2020–	154	48	
Norbert Nachtweih	Midfielder	East Germany	1982–1989	202	20	
Rudolf Nafziger	Forward	West Germany	1964–1968	89	10	
Christian Nerlinger	Midfielder	Germany	1992–1998	156	28	
Manuel Neuer	Goalkeeper	Germany	2011–	389	0	Captain since 2017.
Kurt Niedermayer	Defender	West Germany	1977–1982	145	32	
Branko Oblak	Midfielder	Yugoslavia	1977–1980	71	5	
Rainer Ohlhauser	Forward	West Germany	1961–1970	160	64	
Ivica Olić	Forward	Croatia	2009–2012	55	13	
Michael Olise	Forward	France	2024–	66	27	
Werner Olk	Defender	West Germany	1960–1970	144	2	Captain from 1965–1970.
Andreas Ottl	Midfielder	Germany	2005–2011	92	5	
Benjamin Pavard	Defender	France	2019–2023	111	8	
Aleksandar Pavlović	Midfielder	Germany	2023–	64	6	
Jean-Marie Pfaff	Goalkeeper	Belgium	1982–1988	156	0	
Hans Pflügler	Defender	Germany	1981–1992; 1995	277	36	
Claudio Pizarro	Forward	Peru	2001–2007; 2012–2015	224	87	
Lukas Podolski	Forward	Germany	2006–2009	71	15	
Danijel Pranjić	Midfielder	Croatia	2009–2012	55	1	
Peter Pumm	Defender	Austria	1968–1971	84	2	
Rafinha	Defender	Brazil	2011–2019	179	5	
Wolfgang Rausch	Defender	West Germany	1977–1979	51	3	
Michael Rensing	Goalkeeper	Germany	2003–2010	53	0	
Stefan Reuter	Defender	Germany	1988–1991	95	4	
Franck Ribéry	Midfielder	France	2007–2019	273	86	
Ruggiero Rizzitelli	Forward	Italy	1996–1998	45	12	
Arjen Robben	Midfielder	Netherlands	2009–2019	201	99	
James Rodríguez	Midfielder	Colombia	2017–2019	43	14	
Franz Roth	Midfielder	West Germany	1966–1978	322	72	
Karl-Heinz Rummenigge	Forward	West Germany	1974–1984	310	162	Captain from 1983–1984. Vice-president from 1991–2002. Chairman from 2002–2021.
Michael Rummenigge	Forward	West Germany	1982–1988	152	44	
Marcel Sabitzer	Midfielder	Austria	2021–2023	40	2	
Willy Sagnol	Defender	France	2000–2009	184	7	
Hasan Salihamidžić	Midfielder	Bosnia and Herzegovina	1998–2007	234	30	
Leroy Sané	Forward	Germany	2020–2025	153	40	
Roque Santa Cruz	Forward	Paraguay	1999–2007	155	31	
Helmut Schmidt	Midfielder	West Germany	1967–1970	49	2	
Edgar Schneider	Forward	West Germany	1970–1974	66	7	
Mehmet Scholl	Midfielder	Germany	1992–2007	334	87	
Markus Schupp	Midfielder	Germany	1992–1995	91	12	
Manfred Schwabl	Midfielder	Germany	1984–1986; 1989–1993	87	4	
Georg Schwarzenbeck	Defender	West Germany	1966–1981	416	21	Captain from 1979–1980
Bastian Schweinsteiger	Midfielder	Germany	2002–2015	342	45	
Paulo Sergio	Forward	Brazil	1999–2002	77	21	
Ciriaco Sforza	Midfielder	Switzerland	1995–1996; 2000–2002	65	3	
Xherdan Shaqiri	Midfielder	Switzerland	2012–2015	81	17	
Josip Stanišić	Defender	Croatia	2020–2023; 2024–	68	3	
Michael Sternkopf	Midfielder	Germany	1990–1995	94	4	
Thomas Strunz	Midfielder	Germany	1989–1992; 1995–2001	156	24	
Niklas Süle	Defender	Germany	2017–2022	114	6	
Michael Tarnat	Midfielder	Germany	1997–2003	122	8	
Mathys Tel	Forward	France	2022–2025	60	12	
Thiago	Midfielder	Spain	2013–2020	150	17	
Olaf Thon	Defender	Germany	1988–1994	148	30	
Corentin Tolisso	Midfielder	France	2017–2022	72	11	
Luca Toni	Forward	Italy	2007–2010	60	38	
Conny Torstensson	Forward	Sweden	1973–1977	81	11	
Anatoliy Tymoshchuk	Midfielder	Ukraine	2009–2013	70	3	
Sven Ulreich	Goalkeeper	Germany	2015–2020; 2021–	67	0	
Dayot Upamecano	Defender	France	2021–	126	5	
Daniel Van Buyten	Defender	Belgium	2006–2014	158	20	
Arturo Vidal	Midfielder	Chile	2015–2018	79	14	
Jürgen Wegmann	Forward	West Germany	1987–1989	58	26	
Hans Weiner	Defender	West Germany	1979–1982	91	2	
Holger Willmer	Defender	West Germany	1984–1987	58	5	
Helmut Winklhofer	Defender	West Germany	1981–1982; 1985–1990	50	3	
Marcel Witeczek	Forward	Germany	1993–1997	97	9	
Roland Wohlfarth	Forward	Germany	1984–1993	254	119	
Jan Wouters	Midfielder	Netherlands	1991–1994	66	6	
Klaus Wunder	Forward	West Germany	1974–1975	43	7	
Zé Roberto	Midfielder	Brazil	2002–2006; 2007–2009	169	14	
Alexander Zickler	Forward	Germany	1993–2005	214	51	
Christian Ziege	Midfielder	Germany	1990–1997	185	38	
Rainer Zobel	Midfielder	West Germany	1970–1976	180	19	

== World Cup winners ==
The following players won the FIFA World Cup while playing at Bayern Munich

- (West Germany) Hans Bauer (Switzerland 1954)
- Sepp Maier (West Germany 1974)
- Paul Breitner (West Germany 1974)
- Hans-Georg Schwarzenbeck (West Germany 1974)
- Franz Beckenbauer (West Germany 1974)
- Gerd Müller (West Germany 1974)
- Uli Hoeneß (West Germany 1974)
- Jupp Kapellmann (West Germany 1974)
- (West Germany) Stefan Reuter (Italy 1990)
- (West Germany) Jürgen Kohler (Italy 1990)
- (West Germany) Klaus Augenthaler (Italy 1990)
- (West Germany) Raimond Aumann (Italy 1990)
- (West Germany) Hans Pflügler (Italy 1990)
- (West Germany) Olaf Thon (Italy 1990)
- (Brazil) Jorginho (United States 1994)
- Bixente Lizarazu (France 1998)
- (Germany) Manuel Neuer (Brazil 2014)
- (Germany) Bastian Schweinsteiger (Brazil 2014)
- (Germany) Thomas Müller (Brazil 2014)
- (Germany) Philipp Lahm (Brazil 2014)
- (Germany) Toni Kroos (Brazil 2014)
- (Germany) Mario Götze (Brazil 2014)
- (Germany) Jérôme Boateng (Brazil 2014)
- (France) Corentin Tolisso (Russia 2018)
