= 1971 DFB-Pokal final =

- Match programme cover
- Event: 1970–71 DFB-Pokal
Bayern Munich	1. FC Köln
2	1
- After extra time
- Date: 19 June 1971
- Venue: Neckarstadion, Stuttgart
- Referee: Ferdinand Biwersi (Bliesransbach)
- Attendance: 71,000

The 1971 DFB-Pokal final decided the winner of the 1970–71 DFB-Pokal, the 28th season of Germany's knockout football cup competition. It was played on 19 June 1971 at the Neckarstadion in Stuttgart. Bayern Munich won the match 2–1 after extra time against 1. FC Köln, to claim their 5th cup title.

== Route to the final ==
The DFB-Pokal began with 32 teams in a single-elimination knockout cup competition. There were a total of four rounds leading up to the final. Teams were drawn against each other, and the winner after 90 minutes would advance. If still tied, 30 minutes of extra time was played. If the score was still level, a replay would take place at the original away team's stadium. If still level after 90 minutes, 30 minutes of extra time was played. If the score was still level, a penalty shoot-out was used to determine the winner.

Note: In all results below, the score of the finalist is given first (H: home; A: away).

Bayern Munich		Round	1. FC Köln
Opponent	Result	1970–71 DFB-Pokal	Opponent	Result
Hessen Kassel (A) (H)	2–2 (a.e.t.); 3–0 (replay)	Round 1	SSV Reutlingen (A)	5–2
1. FC Kaiserslautern (A); (H)	1–1 (a.e.t.); 5–0 (replay)	Round of 16	Eintracht Frankfurt (A)	4–1
MSV Duisburg (H)	4–0	Quarter-finals	Hamburger SV (H)	2–0
Fortuna Düsseldorf (A)	1–0	Semi-finals	Schalke 04 (A)	3–2

== Match ==
=== Details ===
19 June 1971
16:00 CET

Bayern Munich	2–1 (a.e.t.)	1. FC Köln
Beckenbauer 53'; Schneider 118'	Report	Rupp 13'

Neckarstadion, Stuttgart
Attendance: 71,000
Referee: Ferdinand Biwersi (Bliesransbach)

Bayern Munich	1. FC Köln

GK	1	(West Germany) Sepp Maier
RB	2	(West Germany) Herwart Koppenhöfer	(red card) 72'
CB	4	(West Germany) Hans-Georg Schwarzenbeck
CB	5	(West Germany) Franz Beckenbauer (c)
LB	3	(West Germany) Paul Breitner
CM	8	(West Germany) Rainer Zobel
CM	10	(West Germany) Uli Hoeneß		(substituted off) 87'
CM	6	(West Germany) Franz Roth		(substituted off) 68'
RW	7	(West Germany) Karl-Heinz Mrosko
CF	9	(West Germany) Gerd Müller
LW	11	(West Germany) Dieter Brenninger
Substitutes:
DF	13	(Denmark) Johnny Hansen		(substituted in) 87'
FW	14	(West Germany) Edgar Schneider		(substituted in) 68'
Manager:
(West Germany) Udo Lattek

GK	1	(Socialist Federal Republic of Yugoslavia) Milutin Šoškić
RB	2	(West Germany) Karl-Heinz Thielen	(substituted off) 99'
CB	5	(West Germany) Werner Biskup
CB	6	(West Germany) Wolfgang Weber
LB	3	(West Germany) Matthias Hemmersbach
CM	8	(West Germany) Heinz Flohe
CM	10	(West Germany) Wolfgang Overath (c)
CM	4	(West Germany) Heinz Simmet	(substituted off) 79'
RW	7	(Austria) Thomas Parits
CF	9	(West Germany) Bernd Rupp
LW	11	(West Germany) Hannes Löhr
Substitutes:
DF	13	(West Germany) Bernhard Cullmann	(substituted in) 99'
FW	14	(West Germany) Jupp Kapellmann	(substituted in) 79'
Manager:
(Austria) Ernst Ocwirk

Match rules

- 90 minutes.
- 30 minutes of extra time if necessary.
- Replay if scores still level.
- Maximum of two substitutions.
