= 1971–72 Bundesliga =

9th season of the Bundesliga

Bundesliga
- Season: 1971–72
- Dates: 14 August 1971 – 28 June 1972
- Champions: Bayern Munich; 2nd Bundesliga title 3rd German title
- Relegated: Borussia Dortmund; Arminia Bielefeld (forced by DFB)
- European Cup: FC Bayern Munich
- Cup Winners' Cup: FC Schalke 04
- UEFA Cup: Borussia Mönchengladbach; 1. FC Köln; Eintracht Frankfurt; 1. FC Kaiserslautern (losing DFB Cup finalists to Schalke)
- Goals: 993
- Average goals/game: 3.25
- Top goalscorer: Gerd Müller (40)
- Biggest home win: FC Bayern 11–1 Dortmund (27 November 1971)
- Biggest away win: Bielefeld 1–7 Br'schweig (28 June 1972)
- Highest scoring: FC Bayern 11–1 Dortmund (12 goals) (27 November 1971)

The 1971–72 Bundesliga was the ninth season of the Bundesliga, West Germany's premier football league. It began on 14 August 1971 and ended on 28 June 1972. Borussia Mönchengladbach were the defending champions.

== Competition modus ==
Every team played two games against each other team, one at home and one away. Teams received two points for a win and one point for a draw. If two or more teams were tied on points, places were determined by goal difference and, if still tied, by goals scored. The team with the most points were crowned champions while the two teams with the fewest points were relegated to their respective Regionalliga divisions.

== Team changes to 1970–71 ==
Kickers Offenbach and Rot-Weiss Essen were relegated to the Regionalliga after finishing in the last two places. They were replaced by VfL Bochum and Fortuna Düsseldorf, who won their respective promotion play-off groups.

== Team overview ==
Location of teams in Bundesliga 1971–72

Club	Ground	Capacity
Hertha BSC	Olympiastadion	100,000
Arminia Bielefeld	Stadion Alm	32,000
VfL Bochum	Ruhrstadion	40,000
Eintracht Braunschweig	Eintracht-Stadion	38,000
SV Werder Bremen	Weserstadion	32,000
Borussia Dortmund	Stadion Rote Erde	30,000
MSV Duisburg	Wedaustadion	38,500
Fortuna Düsseldorf	Flinger Broich	28,000
Eintracht Frankfurt	Waldstadion	87,000
Hamburger SV	Volksparkstadion	80,000
Hannover 96	Niedersachsenstadion	86,000
1. FC Kaiserslautern	Stadion Betzenberg	42,000
1. FC Köln	Müngersdorfer Stadion	76,000
Borussia Mönchengladbach	Bökelbergstadion	34,500
FC Bayern Munich	Stadion an der Grünwalder Straße	44,300
FC Bayern Munich	Olympiastadion (Note: Bayern Munich played only the last match at this stadium.)	70,000
Rot-Weiß Oberhausen	Niederrheinstadion	30,000
FC Schalke 04	Glückauf-Kampfbahn	35,000
VfB Stuttgart	Neckarstadion	53,000

== League table ==
Pos	Team	Pld	W	D	L	GF	GA	GD	Pts	Qualification or relegation
1	Bayern Munich (C)	34	24	7	3	101	38	+63	55	Qualification to European Cup first round
2	Schalke 04	34	24	4	6	76	35	+41	52	Qualification to Cup Winners' Cup first round
3	Borussia Mönchengladbach	34	18	7	9	82	40	+42	43	Qualification to UEFA Cup first round
4	1. FC Köln	34	15	13	6	64	44	+20	43	Qualification to UEFA Cup first round
5	Eintracht Frankfurt	34	16	7	11	71	61	+10	39	Qualification to UEFA Cup first round
6	Hertha BSC	34	14	9	11	46	55	−9	37	
7	1. FC Kaiserslautern	34	14	7	13	59	53	+6	35	Qualification to UEFA Cup first round (Note: As Schalke 04 qualified for the Cup Winners' Cup, their UEFA Cup place was transferred to DFB-Pokal finalists 1. FC Kaiserslautern.)
8	VfB Stuttgart	34	13	9	12	52	56	−4	35	
9	VfL Bochum	34	14	6	14	59	69	−10	34	
10	Hamburger SV	34	13	7	14	52	52	0	33	
11	Werder Bremen	34	11	9	14	63	58	+5	31	
12	Eintracht Braunschweig	34	8	15	11	43	48	−5	31	
13	Fortuna Düsseldorf	34	10	10	14	40	53	−13	30	
14	MSV Duisburg	34	10	7	17	36	51	−15	27	
15	Rot-Weiß Oberhausen	34	7	11	16	33	66	−33	25	
16	Hannover 96	34	10	3	21	54	69	−15	23	
17	Borussia Dortmund (R)	34	6	8	20	34	83	−49	20	Relegation to Regionalliga
18	Arminia Bielefeld (Note: Following the DFB investigation into match fixing, Arminia Bielefeld was automatically relegated. Records were expunged.) (R)	34	6	7	21	41	75	−34	19	Relegation to Regionalliga

Source: www.dfb.de
Rules for classification: 1) points; 2) goal difference; 3) number of goals scored.
(C) Champions; (R) Relegated

== Results ==
Home \ Away	BSC	DSC	BOC	EBS	SVW	BVB	DUI	F95	SGE	HSV	H96	FCK	KOE	BMG	FCB	RWO	S04	VFB
Hertha BSC	—	1–1	1–2	1–0	2–1	2–1	1–0	1–1	0–0	2–0	3–1	2–1	1–1	2–1	2–2	2–0	3–0	2–1
Arminia Bielefeld	1–1	—	3–1	1–7	1–0	3–1	2–0	1–3	3–4	2–2	1–0	1–1	2–3	2–3	0–1	0–1	1–1	1–0
VfL Bochum	4–2	2–1	—	1–0	4–2	4–2	3–1	3–1	3–1	2–1	2–2	4–2	1–5	0–2	0–2	2–0	0–2	1–1
Eintracht Braunschweig	1–1	3–2	0–2	—	1–1	2–0	2–0	1–1	2–0	1–1	3–0	1–1	0–1	2–1	1–1	0–0	0–0	1–1
Werder Bremen	5–0	4–0	2–0	2–4	—	3–1	1–1	1–1	3–1	4–0	2–1	2–2	2–2	2–2	1–2	4–0	2–0	2–3
Borussia Dortmund	1–2	1–0	1–1	2–2	1–5	—	2–3	1–0	3–1	1–1	1–1	2–1	0–0	0–0	0–1	2–1	0–3	0–4
MSV Duisburg	2–0	4–0	2–2	0–0	2–0	2–1	—	0–0	0–1	2–4	2–1	1–0	1–1	1–5	3–0	0–0	2–0	1–2
Fortuna Düsseldorf	1–0	3–2	3–1	0–0	1–3	4–1	0–0	—	1–0	0–0	2–0	0–3	1–1	0–2	0–1	1–1	0–2	4–0
Eintracht Frankfurt	1–1	5–2	3–2	1–1	4–0	5–2	2–1	4–2	—	4–0	3–1	1–0	2–2	3–0	3–2	3–0	2–0	4–1
Hamburger SV	1–2	1–0	3–2	3–1	2–1	0–0	2–0	3–3	5–1	—	2–0	4–0	1–1	1–0	1–4	3–0	0–1	1–2
Hannover 96	1–1	3–1	4–0	3–0	5–1	2–3	3–2	5–0	3–1	2–3	—	1–2	1–4	2–0	1–3	1–0	1–5	3–0
1. FC Kaiserslautern	3–4	2–1	4–1	2–2	2–1	6–0	1–0	3–1	1–1	2–1	2–0	—	2–0	1–0	0–2	0–0	2–2	3–1
1. FC Köln	3–0	1–0	1–1	2–0	0–0	2–1	4–1	1–2	1–1	3–0	3–1	4–2	—	4–3	1–4	4–0	0–1	4–1
Borussia Mönchengladbach	5–2	5–1	1–1	4–1	2–2	7–1	3–0	1–2	6–2	1–0	3–0	2–1	3–0	—	2–2	5–2	7–0	0–0
Bayern Munich	1–0	1–1	5–1	4–1	6–2	11–1	5–1	3–1	6–3	4–3	3–1	3–1	1–1	2–0	—	7–0	5–1	2–2
Rot-Weiß Oberhausen	5–2	2–0	2–3	1–1	2–2	1–1	0–1	2–0	1–0	1–0	3–2	2–5	1–1	0–4	1–1	—	2–3	1–1
Schalke 04	4–0	6–2	4–1	5–1	2–0	1–0	2–0	3–0	2–0	3–0	5–0	3–0	6–2	1–1	1–0	4–0	—	2–1
VfB Stuttgart	3–0	2–2	3–2	3–1	1–0	2–0	1–0	3–1	4–4	0–3	3–2	3–1	1–1	0–1	1–4	1–1	0–1	—

Source: DFB
Legend: Blue = home team win; Yellow = draw; Red = away team win.

== Top goalscorers ==
40 goals

- (Germany) Gerd Müller (FC Bayern Munich)

22 goals

- (Germany) Klaus Fischer (FC Schalke 04)
- (Germany) Hans Walitza (VfL Bochum)

20 goals

- (Germany) Ferdinand Keller (Hannover 96)

19 goals

- (Germany) Jupp Heynckes (Borussia Mönchengladbach)

18 goals

- (Germany) Klaus Scheer (FC Schalke 04)

17 goals

- (Germany) Günter Netzer (Borussia Mönchengladbach)

16 goals

- (Germany) Bernd Rupp (1. FC Köln)

13 goals

- (Germany) Uli Hoeneß (FC Bayern Munich)
- (Socialist Federal Republic of Yugoslavia) Idriz Hošić (1. FC Kaiserslautern)
- (Germany) Bernd Nickel (Eintracht Frankfurt)
- (Germany) Werner Weist (SV Werder Bremen)

== Champion squad ==
FC Bayern Munich
Goalkeepers: Sepp Maier (34); Manfred Seifert (1).

Defenders: Franz Beckenbauer (34 / 6); Johnny Hansen (Denmark) (32 / 4); Hans-Georg Schwarzenbeck (32 / 1); Paul Breitner (30 / 4); Herwart Koppenhöfer (14); Günther Rybarczyk (4).
Midfielders: Uli Hoeneß (34 / 13); Franz Roth (32 / 12); Rainer Zobel (32 / 4).
Forwards: Gerd Müller (34 / 40); Franz Krauthausen (28 / 5); Wolfgang Sühnholz (25 / 4); Edgar Schneider (23 / 2); Wilhelm Hoffmann (16 / 3); Franz Gerber (1).
(league appearances and goals listed in brackets)

Manager: Udo Lattek.

On the roster but have not played in a league game: Herbert Schröder.

== See also ==
- 1971–72 DFB-Pokal
