= Mrosko =

Mrosko is a surname. Notable people with the surname include:

- Bob Mrosko (born 1965), American football player
- Karl-Heinz Mrosko (1946-2019), German footballer
