= Neuötting =

- Town
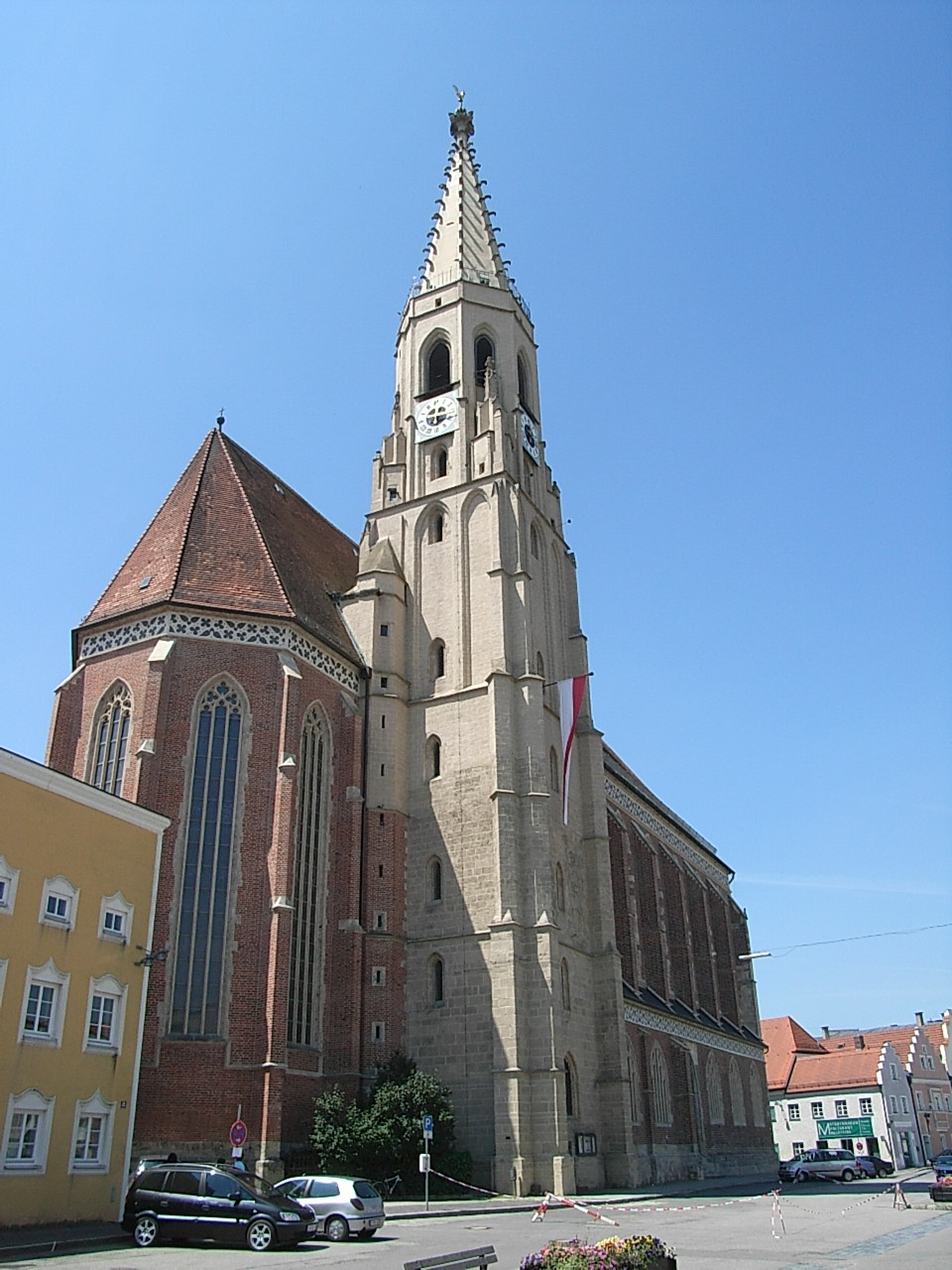
- Saint Nicholas Church

- Coat of arms

- Location of Neuötting within Altötting district
- Interactive map of Neuötting
- Location within Germany Location within Bavaria
- Coordinates: 48°13′N 12°41′E
- Country: Germany
- State: Bavaria
- Admin. region: Upper Bavaria
- District: Altötting

Government
  - Mayor (2020–26): Peter Haugeneder (SPD)

Area
  - Total: 36.6 km^{2} (14.1 sq mi)
- Elevation: 392 m (1,286 ft)

Population (2025-12-31)
  - Total: 8,983
  - Density: 245/km^{2} (636/sq mi)
- Time zone: UTC+01:00 (CET)
  - Summer (DST): UTC+02:00 (CEST)
- Postal codes: 84524
- Dialling codes: 08671
- Vehicle registration: AÖ
- Website: www.neuoetting.de

Neuötting (German pronunciation: [nɔʏˈʔœtɪŋ], lit. 'New Ötting', in contrast to "Old Ötting"; Bavarian: Neieding) is a town in the district of Altötting, in Bavaria, Germany. It is situated on the river Inn, 2 km north of Altötting, about 70 km north of Salzburg, 80 southwest of Passau and almost 100 km east of Munich. It is a stop on the railway line between Munich and Simbach.

== Townscape ==
Neuötting has a town square in the unique Inn-Salzach style, including two towers at each end. During the Middle Ages it was an important trading town for salt and grain, and had its own mint. It was also a military base for the Bavarian forces to keep Mühldorf am Inn, a rival town under the control of the Bishop of Salzburg, in check. Places of note for visitors are the large Gothic church Saint Nikolaus, the town museum, and the recently improved town square, on which shopping and open-air dining can be done.

== Trivia ==
- Most of the cobbles that make up the town square were made in China.
- A trolley line connected Neuötting with Altötting in the first half of the last century.

== Culture ==
- The Spielmanns- und Fanfarenzug Neuötting e. V. (SPFZ) was founded in 1960 and perform marching songs in historic militia uniforms from the year 1820.
- The Faschingsgesellschaft Neuötting e. V. was founded in 1975 as an official association, while this club has a much longer history.

== Personalities ==
=== Born in Neuötting ===
- Günther Rybarczyk (born 1951), football player, coach and functionary

=== Connected with Neuötting ===
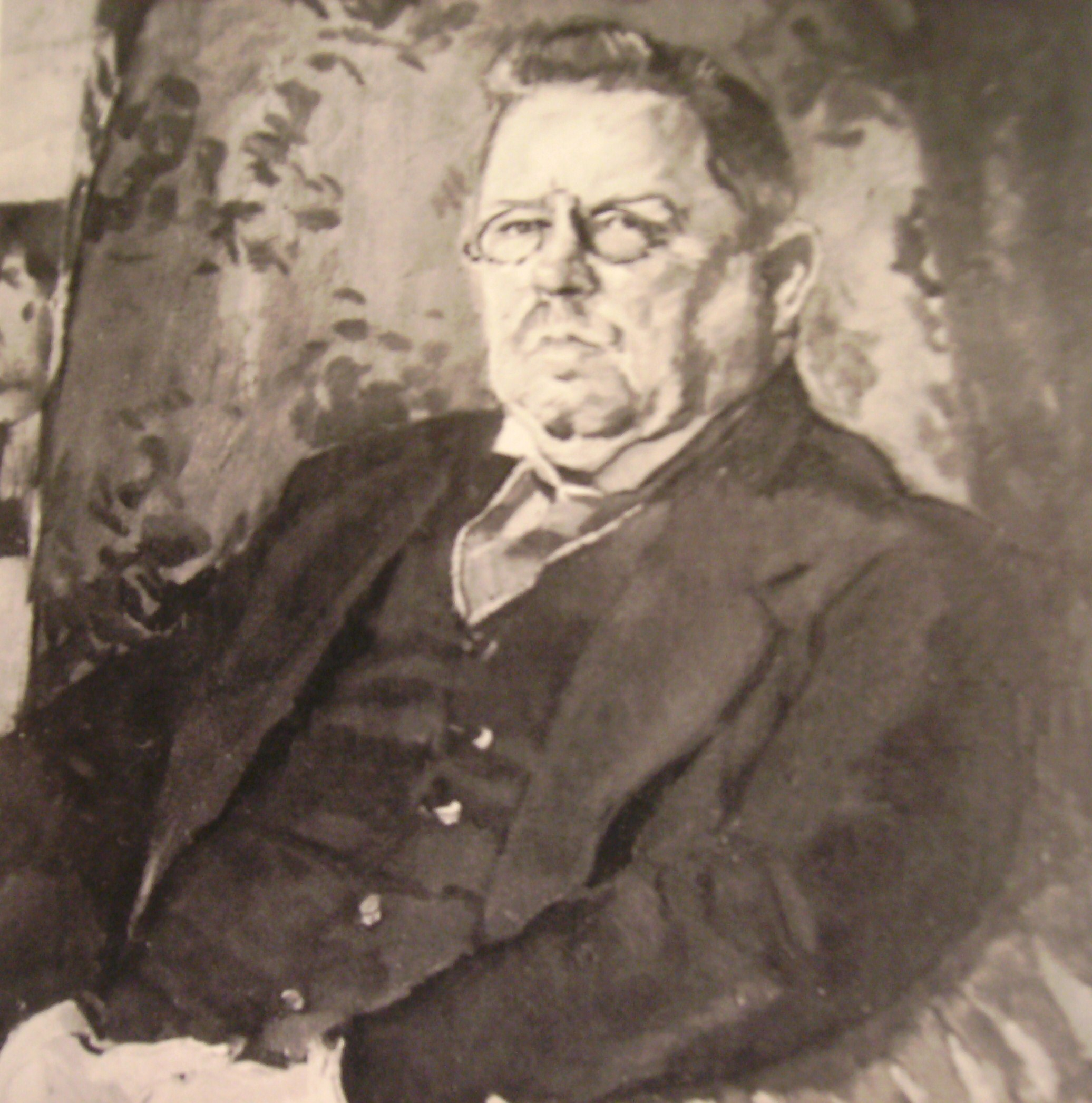
Max Halbe

- Max Halbe (1865–1944), writer
- Hans Pfann (born 1920), Olympic participant, former gymnast of the TSV 1852 Neuötting
- Gerold Tandler (born 1936), politician (CSU)
- Franz Ackermann (born 1963), painter, grew up in Neuötting
