= Karl-Heinz Kamp =

German footballer and coach

Personal information
- Date of birth: 26 September 1946 (age 80)
- Place of birth: Bingen am Rhein, West Germany
- Height: 1.73 m (5 ft 8 in)
- Positions: Defender; midfielder

Team information
- Current team: Werder Bremen (scout)

Youth career
- Hassia Bingen-Kempten

Senior career*
Years	Team	Apps	(Gls)
1965–1967	SC Opel 06 Rüsselsheim		
1967–1969	SpVgg Fürth		
1969–1970	SC Opel 06 Rüsselsheim		
1970–1984	Werder Bremen	400	(30)

Managerial career
- 1980–1995: Werder Bremen II
- 1985–2005: Werder Bremen (assistant)
- 2005–: Werder Bremen (scout)
- * Club domestic league appearances and goals

Karl-Heinz "Kalli" Kamp (born 26 September 1946) is a German retired football player and coach. He spent 13 seasons in the Bundesliga with Werder Bremen. As of July 2012, he works as a scout for Werder Bremen.
