= Ulrich Braun =

German footballer (1941–2023)

Personal information
- Date of birth: 23 August 1941
- Place of birth: Germany
- Date of death: 4 July 2023 (aged 81)
- Position: Midfielder

Senior career*
Years	Team	Apps	(Gls)
1964–1967	Schwarz-Weiß Essen	30	(4)
1967–1972	Arminia Bielefeld	68	(5)
1974–1975	FC Gütersloh 2000	12	(1)
- * Club domestic league appearances and goals

Ulrich Braun (23 August 1941 – 4 July 2023) was a German football midfielder who played for Schwarz-Weiß Essen, Arminia Bielefeld and FC Gütersloh 2000.

Braun died on 4 July 2023, at the age of 81.
