= Wolfgang Sühnholz =

German-American footballer and coach (1946–2019)

Personal information
- Date of birth: 14 September 1946
- Place of birth: Berlin, Germany
- Date of death: 27 December 2019 (aged 73)
- Place of death: Georgetown, Texas, United States
- Height: 1.85 m (6 ft 1 in)
- Position: Midfielder

Senior career*
Years	Team	Apps	(Gls)
1968–1970	Hertha Zehlendorf		
1970–1971	Rot-Weiß Oberhausen	32	(6)
1971–1973	Bayern Munich	25	(4)
1974	Grasshoppers	6	(0)
1974–1975	Tennis Borussia Berlin	8	(1)
1975–1976	Boston Minutemen	23	(8)
1976	Toronto Metros-Croatia	4	(0)
1976	Vancouver Whitecaps	2	(0)
1977	Las Vegas Quicksilvers	20	(4)
1978	Los Angeles Aztecs	14	(5)
1978–1980	California Surf	31	(3)

Managerial career
- 1987–1989: Austin Sockadillos (assistant)
- 1989–1991: Austin Sockadillos
- 1994–1997: Austin Lone Stars
- 1997: United States U16 (assistant)
- 1998–1999: Austin Lone Stars
- 1999–2001: United States U20
- 2008–2009: Austin Aztex U23
- * Club domestic league appearances and goals

Wolfgang Sühnholz (14 September 1946 – 27 December 2019) was a German-American soccer coach and former player. He won in the 1971–72 Bundesliga with Bayern Munich and in 1976 the North-American Soccer Bowl with Toronto Metros-Croatia. Later he settled in the United States and worked as a coach.

== Playing career ==
Initially he played for Hertha Zehlendorf with which he won the Regionalliga Berlin - part of the national second tier which was split up into five regional divisions - in 1969 and 1970. After this he joined first division side Rot-Weiss Oberhausen where he immediately established himself in the standard formation.

After narrowly avoiding relegation he transferred together with Franz Krauthausen to the 1971 runners-up of the national championship FC Bayern Munich. Again, he immediately became part of their standard formation, playing alongside the stars of that era like Franz Beckenbauer and Gerd Müller. He played in 25 of the first 27 league matches of the side that went on to win in 1972 the third national championship in club history. In a cup match against 1. FC Köln in April 1972 he sustained a broken leg, which precluded him from almost two years.

Comeback attempts with Swiss first division side Grasshopper Club Zürich, where he played in March and April 1974 in six matches, albeit only one over 90 minutes, and Tennis Borussia Berlin, then a newcomer to the German first division, where he played in eight matches, thereof three over the full 90 minutes, between August and October of the same year, essentially failed. Notwithstanding, he scored a goal in his last match for the Berliners.

He came to the United States as a player and assistant coach in the NASL. He was named the 1976 Soccer Bowl MVP after capturing the title with Toronto Metros-Croatia. The following season (1977) he earned All-NASL First Team honors, joining legends who were on the same team that year, Pelé, Gordon Banks, George Best, and Franz Beckenbauer.

== Managerial career ==
Sühnholz was a national team coach for the U.S. Soccer Federation from 1996 to 2001; 1996–1999 as an assistant coach for the U-16 and U-20 Nationals Teams; head coach for the U.S. U-20 Men National Team from 1999 to 2001. While coaching for the U.S. Soccer he went to two World Cups and led his U-20 Teams to the World Cup in 2001 in Argentina. Since 2001 he was a head coach for the USYS ODP Region III, coaching the 86, 87, 88 and 89 boys' teams. A founder, along with Francisco Marcos, of the Austin Sockadillos, a team in the Southwest Indoor Soccer League, Sühnholz served as an assistant coach for the team from 1987 to 1989 when he replaced head coach Tony Simoes. He then coached the team until 1991. In 1994, he returned to the team, now known as the Austin Lone Stars of the USISL. In May 1997, he was named an assistant coach with the United States U-16 men's national soccer team. He returned to the Lone Stars in 1998.

Sühnholz held a USSF "A" License.
