= Peter Pumm =

Austrian footballer

Personal information
- Date of birth: 3 April 1943 (age 83)
- Place of birth: Vienna, Nazi Germany
- Height: 1.71 m (5 ft 7 in)
- Position: Defender

Senior career*
Years	Team	Apps	(Gls)
1961–1964	1. Simmeringer SC	54	(4)
1964–1968	FC Wacker Innsbruck	91	(2)
1968–1971	FC Bayern Munich	84	(2)
1971–1975	Alpine Donawitz	89	(1)
1975–1977	SSW Innsbruck	7	(0)

International career
1965–1973	Austria	19	(1)
- * Club domestic league appearances and goals

Peter Pumm (born 3 April 1943) is a former Austrian footballer.

== Honours ==
FC Bayern Munich

- Bundesliga: 1968–69
- DFB-Pokal: 1968–69, 1970–71
