= Günther Rybarczyk =

German footballer

Personal information
- Date of birth: 4 November 1951 (age 74)
- Place of birth: Neuötting, West Germany
- Height: 1.76 m (5 ft 9 in)
- Position: Defender

Senior career*
Years	Team	Apps	(Gls)
1971–1973	FC Bayern Munich	6	(0)
1973–1976	1. FSV Mainz 05	43	(4)
1976–1978	FC 08 Villingen		
1981–1983	TuS Schloß Neuhaus	4	(0)

Managerial career
- 1993–2001: SC Paderborn
- * Club domestic league appearances and goals

Günther Rybarczyk (born 4 November 1951 in Neuötting) is a retired German football player. He spent two seasons in the Bundesliga with FC Bayern Munich. As of February 2009, he is a player agent.

== Honours ==
- Bundesliga: 1971–72, 1972–73
