= Egon Coordes =

German football player and manager (1944–2025)

Personal information
- Date of birth: 13 July 1944
- Place of birth: Wesermünde, Germany
- Date of death: 17 June 2025 (aged 80)
- Place of death: Memmingen, Germany
- Height: 1.86 m (6 ft 1 in)
- Position: Defender

Senior career*
Years	Team	Apps	(Gls)
1968–1969	TuS Bremerhaven 93		
1969–1971	Werder Bremen	50	(1)
1971–1976	VfB Stuttgart	107	(8)

Managerial career
- 1977–1982: OSC Bremerhaven
- 1986–1987: VfB Stuttgart
- 1992: Hamburger SV
- 1993–1994: Al-Ahli
- 1994–1995: Austria Wien
- 1995–1996: Hannover 96
- 1998–1999: FC Luzern
- 1999: Iran Under-23
- 2001–2002: Al Khaleej
- 2002–2003: FC Gatt
- * Club domestic league appearances and goals

Egon Coordes (13 July 1944 – 17 June 2025) was a German football player and coach.

== Playing career ==
Coordes originally played football for the Leher TS youth side. Coordes later started his professional game career in the late 1960s with Regionalliga North TuS Bremerhaven 93 and became well-known beyond the team. Coordes quickly moved to the top-ranked Bundesliga in 1971, playing through the rest of his career as defender at Werder Bremen and VfB Stuttgart.

On 26 January 1974, Coordes managed to score the 10,000th Bundesliga goal against Eintracht Frankfurt. Coordes played a final season with Stuttgart before retiring as a player in 1976, aged 31.

== Coaching career ==
When Coordes first entered professional football coaching (with OSC Bremerhaven on 13 March 1982) he declared that his players should "fight and bite like the lions." He was indeed widely considered a "passionate athlete" who preferred training cones and a stopwatch. He felt tactics were overrated.

However, Coordes was roughly viewed for most of his football career as a coach who "leads a hard regiment, which does not necessarily result in an increased affection of its professionals." His style of leadership long carried the nickname "Schleifer" (in English "Grinder"). For one of many examples, in 1994 while Coordes was coaching for Austria Wien he once dropped legendary player Andreas Ogris from the squad for being five minutes late. Ogris was forcefully pardoned soon after.

In 1984, Coordes coached in the Regionalliga North and later moved to the post of assistant coach at Bayern Munich. He then stepped up to head coach at his former VfB Stuttgart club in 1986, but for only a single season as the team finished behind in 12th place.

In 1992, Coordes returned to his former post at Bayern Munich before again becoming head coach of Hamburger SV, but was sacked by Hamburger management after a mere six months.

In 1993, Coordes moved via the Shabab Al Ahli Club to the Al-Nasr, the first and oldest football league in the United Arab Emirates. A year onward he returned to Germany and joined the 2. Bundesliga side, Hannover 96. Coordes struggled with Hannover management as the club plunged into the Regionalliga for the first time in their history. He was promptly sacked.

In 1998, Coordes returned to Bayern Munich as assistant coach. He later moved to Switzerland for a season with FC Luzern before returning to the Middle East as the Iranian "under-23" and National Olympia Trainer. He then transitioned again to Al-Khaleej of the UAE.

In 2011, Coordes represented Bayern as a keen football scout rather than coach. He traveled to Croatia to negotiate a transfer of Dino Špehar to Munich. The discussion failed and years later Špehar said, "I do not regret that I refused Manchester and Bayern. I came to make history and become one of the best players in the championship."

In late 2012, Coordes was asked to seriously advise and rescue FC Bayern Munich basketball team, a move seen by some as odd. He said during interview that, "the job was 'new territory' but the sport speaks one language. I had no concerns." In the same period, he became credited with originally discovering Hansi Flick.

By 2020, Coordes was considered one of the best scouts in world football. He later retired from football except for casual appearances as consultant.

== Issues with the press ==
Coordes often had little respect for journalists and news photographers through the years, which resulted in his often poor coverage in the press. As follows, Coordes never liked giving interviews, and at one point stated that his repeated negative press stories "reminds me of the Nazi era".

== Personal life and death ==
Coordes was born on 13 July 1944.

In June 2023, Coordes was publicly thanked for "wisdom, views, and fabulous cigars" when an artist returned from Dachau after Coordes insisted he make the trip.

Coordes died on 17 June 2025, at the age of 80.
