= Herbert Schröder =

German footballer (1945–2000)

- Schröder in 1971

Personal information
- Full name: Herbert Schröder
- Date of birth: 22 December 1945
- Place of birth: Rhade, Lower Saxony, West Germany
- Date of death: 12 May 2000 (aged 54)
- Place of death: Los Angeles, California, U.S.
- Position: Midfielder

Youth career
- Rhade
- ???–1966: Werder Bremen

Senior career*
Years	Team	Apps	(Gls)
1966–1967	Werder Bremen	4	(0)
1967–1971	VfL Osnabrück	139	(42)
1971	Bayern Munich	0	(0)
1971–1973	SK VÖEST Linz	15	(6)
- * Club domestic league appearances and goals

Herbert Schröder (22 December 1945 – 12 May 2000) was a German footballer who played as a midfielder. In 1966, he was part of the winning amateur team of SV Werder Bremen. His primary career would be as part of the VfL Osnabrück squad that won the second tier Regionalliga Nord three times in a row from 1969 to 1971. He ended his professional career in 1973 in Austria with the Austrian Bundesliga club SK VÖEST Linz. He later emigrated to the United States, where he ran a carpeting company.

== Club career ==
After his youth days at TSV Rhade in the municipality of the same name in the district of Rotenburg (Wümme), Schröder came to the club's amateurs via the youth department of SV Werder Bremen, with whom he won the German amateur championship in 1966 at the age of 20 as a playmaker with a 5–1 final victory over the amateurs of Hannover 96, in which he contributed a goal. In the 1966–67 Bundesliga, he played four games in which SV Werder finished 16th. He played his first game on Matchday 2 on 27 August 1966 in a 2–1 home defeat against VfB Stuttgart; his three other games, 1–2 against TSV 1860 Munich, 1–3 against 1. FC Köln on matchdays 16 and 17 and 0–3 against Karlsruher SC on matchday 28, all being losses.

The coach of the Bremen amateur championship team, Hans-Wilhelm Loßmann, moved to Osnabrück for the season in the then second-tier Regionalliga Nord to VfL Osnabrück. With him came Carsten Baumann, Jürgen Ey and Herbert Schröder. At the end of the 1967–68 season, Osnabrück was seventh and coach Loßmann, who left in a dispute, was replaced by the Yugoslav Radoslav Momirski, under whom the most successful era in the club's history began, which culminated in the three regional league championships from 1969 to 1971. In the promotion round to the Bundesliga, the Osnabrück-based team finished second in the group twice without having had any genuine chance of promotion. Schröder was the elegant, ball-sure and goal-scoring player of the club and scored 42 goals in 139 games and assisted more than twice as many. "We don't need a Seeler, we don't need a hero – we have Herbert Schröder, the best man in the world!" chanted a banner at the Stadion an der Bremer Brücke, which was experiencing new attendance records at the time.

Bayern Munich wanted to get the relatively expensive Allgäu powerhouse footballer Franz Roth off the payroll before their 1971–72 season. President Wilhelm Neudecker announced that "physically Schröder is a guy like Roth" and signed him for the Bundesliga team, after he had already hired Jürgen Ey from Osnabrück the year before. Whilst Roth would remain with Bayern for the rest of the season and be part of the winning squad for the third time at the end of the season, Schröder wouldn't play a competitive match in the team around Franz Beckenbauer and Gerd Müller and stated years later that: "I would never have gone to Bayern".

During the winter break, he moved to SK VÖEST Linz in Austria. A car accident probably prevented him from playing for the Austrians this season. In the 1972–73 Austrian football championship, he played 15 games, scored six goals and contributed to the fifth place in the table at the end of the season. At the beginning of the season, he also played his only two games in European football, when he and his team were eliminated from the competition in the 1st round of the 1972–73 UEFA Cup with a 4-2 aggregate loss to Dynamo Dresden.

He then returned to Osnabrück and ended his active football career at VfR Voxtrup in the Kreisliga.

== Later life ==
In 1979 he emigrated to Santa Monica, California where he founded a carpet company with his sister and later succumbed on 12 May 2000 to the consequences of his second heart valve operation in ten years at Los Angeles at the age of 54. He was cremated in California and buried in his birthplace of Rhade as he planned to settle back in Osnabrück in his old age, where he visited every year.
