= Herward Koppenhöfer =

German footballer

Personal information
- Date of birth: 25 May 1946 (age 80)
- Place of birth: Germany
- Height: 1.72 m (5 ft 8 in)
- Position: Defender

Senior career*
Years	Team	Apps	(Gls)
1965–1969	1. FC Kaiserslautern	118	(1)
1969–1972	FC Bayern Munich	71	(0)
1972	VfB Stuttgart	5	(0)
1973	Kickers Offenbach	13	(0)
1974	Hertha BSC	7	(0)
1974–1981	1. FSV Mainz 05	57	(0)

International career
1967–1969	West Germany U-23	5	(0)
- * Club domestic league appearances and goals

Herward Koppenhöfer (born 25 May 1946) is a retired German football player. He spent nine seasons in the Bundesliga with 1. FC Kaiserslautern, FC Bayern Munich, VfB Stuttgart, Kickers Offenbach and Hertha BSC.

== Honours ==
- Bundesliga champion: 1971–72
- Bundesliga runner-up: 1969–70, 1970–71
- DFB-Pokal winner: 1970–71
