= Franz Krauthausen =

German footballer (born 1946)

Personal information
- Date of birth: 27 February 1946 (age 80)
- Place of birth: Oberhausen, Germany
- Positions: Midfielder; forward

Youth career
- 1954–1961: FC Germania Dürwiß
- 1961–1965: SC Jülich 1910

Senior career*
Years	Team	Apps	(Gls)
1965–1966	1. FC Köln	11	(4)
1966–1971	Rot-Weiß Oberhausen		
1971–1973	Bayern Munich	57	(9)
1973–1975	Schalke 04	6	(0)
1977	Las Vegas Quicksilvers	23	(1)
1978	San Diego Sockers	5	(1)
1977–1978	FC Volendam	1	(0)
1979	California Surf		(0)
- * Club domestic league appearances and goals

Franz Krauthausen (born 27 February 1946 in Oberhausen) is a German former professional footballer who played as a midfielder or forward. He spent seven seasons in the Bundesliga with 1. FC Köln, Rot-Weiß Oberhausen, FC Bayern Munich and FC Schalke 04, after which he finished his career playing in the US league.

== Honours ==
- Bundesliga: 1971–72, 1972–73
