= Manfred Seifert =

German footballer

Personal information
- Date of birth: 22 April 1949
- Place of birth: Rosenheim, Germany
- Date of death: April 2005
- Position: Goalkeeper

Youth career
- TSV 1860 Rosenheim

Senior career*
| Years | Team | Apps | (Gls) |
| 1969–1973 | FC Bayern Munich | 4 | (0) |
| 1973–1978 | Bayern Hof | 79 | (0) |
- * Club domestic league appearances and goals

Manfred "Manni" Seifert (22 April 1949, in Rosenheim – April 2005, in Rosenheim) was a German football player. He spent 4 seasons in the Bundesliga with FC Bayern Munich.

== Honours ==
- Bundesliga champion: 1972, 1973.
- Bundesliga runner-up: 1970, 1971.
- DFB-Pokal winner: 1971.
