= Karl-Heinz Mrosko =

German footballer and manager (1946–2019)

Personal information
- Date of birth: 11 October 1946
- Place of birth: Lindau, Germany
- Date of death: 18 March 2019 (aged 72)
- Place of death: Wilhelmshaven, Germany
- Positions: Midfielder; forward

Youth career
- 1966–1968: SpVgg Lindau

Senior career*
Years	Team	Apps	(Gls)
1968–1969	Stuttgarter Kickers	29	(14)
1969–1971	Bayern Munich	50	(13)
1971–1972	1. FC Nürnberg	32	(4)
1972–1973	Hannover 96	29	(3)
1973–1974	1860 Munich	28	(9)
1974–1979	Arminia Hannover	125	(91)
1978	→ Oakland Stompers (loan)	26	(11)
1979–1981	Hannover 96	67	(11)
Total		386	(156)

Managerial career
- 1978: Oakland Stompers
- 1985–1989: 1. SC Göttingen 05
- 1990–1991: TSV Havelse
- 1994–1995: 1. SC Göttingen 05
- 2001–2003: MTV 1907 Engelbostel-Schulenburg
Medal record
Bayern Munich
Winner	DFB-Pokal	1971
- * Club domestic league appearances and goals

Karl-Heinz Mrosko (11 October 1946 – 18 March 2019) was a German footballer who played as a midfielder for Stuttgarter Kickers, Bayern Munich, 1. FC Nürnberg, Hannover 96, 1860 Munich and Arminia Hannover. He also had a brief spell in the North American Soccer League with Oakland Stompers.

Mrosko died on 18 March 2019 in a hospital in Wilhelmshaven because of an infection in his pancreas. He had two daughters and one son.
