= 1970–71 DFB-Pokal =

Tournament details
- Country: West Germany
- Teams: 32

Final positions
- Champions: Bayern Munich
- Runners-up: 1. FC Köln

Tournament statistics
- Matches played: 36

The 1970–71 DFB-Pokal was the 28th season of the annual German football cup competition. It began on 12 December 1970 and ended on 19 June 1971. 32 teams competed in the tournament of five rounds. In the final Bayern Munich defeated 1. FC Köln 2–1 after extra time. It was Bayern's fifth triumph in the cup while it was Cologne's second consecutive loss in the final.

== Mode ==
The tournament consisted of five single elimination rounds. In case a game ended with a draw 30 minutes of extra time were played. If the score was still level the game was replayed with 30 minutes of extra time in case of another draw. For the first time a penalty shootout was held if no winner could be determined after the replay.

== Matches ==
=== First round ===
12 December 1970
KSV Hessen Kassel	2 – 2	FC Bayern Munich	(AET)
TSV Westerland	0 – 4	Borussia Dortmund
SG Wattenscheid 09	1 – 2	Hertha BSC
VfR Heilbronn	2 – 0	Kickers Offenbach
SV Alsenborn	1 – 1	Borussia Mönchengladbach	(AET)
SSV Reutlingen	2 – 5	1. FC Köln
Borussia Neunkirchen	1 – 2	1. FC Kaiserslautern
Tasmania 1900 Berlin	1 – 0	Eintracht Braunschweig
Hannover 96	2 – 3	Hamburger SV	(AET)
Rot-Weiß Oberhausen	4 – 3	Rot-Weiß Essen
FC St. Pauli	2 – 3	Eintracht Frankfurt	(AET)
VfL Wolfsburg	2 – 2	FC Schalke 04	(AET)
Fortuna Düsseldorf	3 – 1	SV Werder Bremen	(AET)
FC 08 Homburg	1 – 1	MSV Duisburg	(AET)
Holstein Kiel	2 – 1	VfB Stuttgart
Wuppertaler SV Borussia	5 – 0	Arminia Bielefeld

==== Replays ====
23 December 1970
FC Bayern Munich	3 – 0	KSV Hessen Kassel
FC Schalke 04	1 – 1	VfL Wolfsburg	(AET) (Schalke won 3 – 1 on penalties)
MSV Duisburg	4 – 0	FC 08 Homburg
30 December 1970
Borussia Mönchengladbach	3 – 1	SV Alsenborn

=== Round of 16 ===
20 February 1971
1. FC Kaiserslautern	1 – 1	FC Bayern Munich
Eintracht Frankfurt	1 – 4	1. FC Köln
Hamburger SV	3 – 1	Borussia Dortmund	(AET)
Fortuna Düsseldorf	4 – 0	Wuppertaler SV Borussia
MSV Duisburg	2 – 0	Tasmania 1900 Berlin
Holstein Kiel	2 – 5	Rot-Weiß Oberhausen	(AET)
Hertha BSC	1 – 3	Borussia Mönchengladbach
FC Schalke 04	4 – 0	VfR Heilbronn

==== Replay ====
30 March 1971
FC Bayern Munich	5 – 0	1. FC Kaiserslautern

=== Quarter-finals ===
7 April 1971
FC Bayern Munich	4 – 0	MSV Duisburg
Fortuna Düsseldorf	3 – 1	Borussia Mönchengladbach
FC Schalke 04	1 – 0	Rot-Weiß Oberhausen
8 April 1971
1. FC Köln	2 – 0	Hamburger SV

=== Semi-finals ===
12 May 1971
Fortuna Düsseldorf	0 – 1	FC Bayern Munich
FC Schalke 04	2 – 3	1. FC Köln

=== Final ===
19 June 1971
16:00 CET

Bayern Munich	2–1 (a.e.t.)	1. FC Köln
Beckenbauer 53'; Schneider 118'	Report	Rupp 13'

Neckarstadion, Stuttgart
Attendance: 71,000
Referee: Ferdinand Biwersi (Bliesransbach)
