= Edgar Schneider =

German footballer

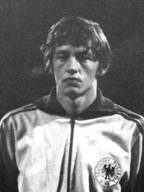

Personal information
- Date of birth: August 17, 1949 (age 77)
- Place of birth: Pforzheim, Germany
- Positions: Striker; midfielder

Youth career
- 1959–1968: VfR Pforzheim

Senior career*
Years	Team	Apps	(Gls)
1968–1970	VfR Pforzheim		
1970–1973	FC Bayern Munich	66	(7)
1973–1978	FC Augsburg	90	(12)
1978–1986	VfR Pforzheim		
- * Club domestic league appearances and goals

Edgar Schneider (born August 17, 1949, in Pforzheim) is a retired German football player. He spent 4 seasons in the Bundesliga with FC Bayern Munich.

== Honours ==
- Bundesliga champion: 1972, 1973
- Bundesliga runner-up: 1971.
- DFB-Pokal winner: 1971 (scored the winning goal with 2 minutes to go in extra time).
