= 2025–26 Borussia Dortmund season =

Borussia Dortmund
2025–26 season
- Chairman: Lars Ricken (CEO)
- Head coach: Niko Kovač
- Stadium: Westfalenstadion
- Bundesliga: 2nd
- DFB-Pokal: Round of 16
- UEFA Champions League: Knockout phase play-offs
- Top goalscorer: League: Serhou Guirassy (17); All: Serhou Guirassy (22)
- Highest home attendance: 81,365 (22 matches)
- Lowest home attendance: 76,900 v Atalanta
- Average home league attendance: 81,365
Home colours	Away colours	Europe colours

The 2025–26 season was the 117th season in the existence of Borussia Dortmund, and the club's 50th consecutive season in the top flight of German football. In addition to the domestic league, the club competed in the DFB-Pokal and the UEFA Champions League.

== Players ==
=== First team squad ===
As of 26 January 2026

Note: Flags indicate national team as defined under FIFA eligibility rules; some limited exceptions apply. Players may hold more than one non-FIFA nationality.

No.	Pos.	Nation	Player
1	GK	SUI	Gregor Kobel
2	DF	BRA	Yan Couto
3	DF	GER	Waldemar Anton
4	DF	GER	Nico Schlotterbeck (vice-captain)
5	DF	ALG	Ramy Bensebaini
6	MF	TUR	Salih Özcan
7	MF	ENG	Jobe Bellingham
8	MF	GER	Felix Nmecha
9	FW	GUI	Serhou Guirassy
10	MF	GER	Julian Brandt (3rd captain)
14	FW	GER	Maximilian Beier
17	MF	AUT	Carney Chukwuemeka
20	MF	AUT	Marcel Sabitzer
21	FW	POR	Fábio Silva

No.	Pos.	Nation	Player
23	MF	GER	Emre Can (captain)
24	DF	SWE	Daniel Svensson
25	DF	GER	Niklas Süle
26	DF	NOR	Julian Ryerson
27	FW	GER	Karim Adeyemi
30	GK	GER	Patrick Drewes
31	GK	GER	Silas Ostrzinski
33	GK	GER	Alexander Meyer
39	DF	ITA	Filippo Mané
40	FW	ITA	Samuele Inacio
41	FW	USA	Mathis Albert
42	DF	GER	Almugera Kabar
49	DF	ITA	Luca Reggiani

=== Out on loan ===
Note: Flags indicate national team as defined under FIFA eligibility rules; some limited exceptions apply. Players may hold more than one non-FIFA nationality.

No.	Pos.	Nation	Player
—	GK	GER	Diant Ramaj (at 1. FC Heidenheim until 30 June 2026)
16	FW	BEL	Julien Duranville (at Basel until 30 June 2026)

No.	Pos.	Nation	Player
37	FW	USA	Cole Campbell (at TSG Hoffenheim until 30 June 2026)
38	MF	GER	Kjell Wätjen (at VfL Bochum until 30 June 2026)

== Transfers ==
=== In ===
No.	Pos.	Player	Transferred from	Fee	Date	Source
—	GK	(Germany) Diant Ramaj	(Denmark) Copenhagen	Loan return	1 July 2025	
—	DF	(Spain) Guille Bueno	(Germany) Darmstadt 98	Loan return	1 July 2025	
28	FW	(Ivory Coast) Sébastien Haller	(Netherlands) Utrecht	Loan return	1 July 2025	
18	FW	(Germany) Youssoufa Moukoko	(France) Nice	Loan return	1 July 2025	
2	DF	(Brazil) Yan Couto	(England) Manchester City	€20,000,000	1 July 2025	
24	DF	(Sweden) Daniel Svensson	(Denmark) Nordsjælland	€6,500,000	1 July 2025	
30	GK	(Germany) Patrick Drewes	(Germany) VfL Bochum	€250,000	1 July 2025	
17	MF	(Austria) Carney Chukwuemeka	(England) Chelsea	€20,000,000	26 August 2025	
28	DF	(Argentina) Aarón Anselmino	(England) Chelsea	Loan	27 August 2025	
21	FW	(Portugal) Fábio Silva	(England) Wolverhampton Wanderers	€22,500,000	29 August 2025	

=== Out ===
No.	Pos.	Player	Transferred to	Fee	Date	Source
18	FW	(Germany) Youssoufa Moukoko	(Denmark) Copenhagen	€5,000,000	1 July 2025	
35	GK	(Poland) Marcel Lotka	(Germany) Fortuna Düsseldorf	Free transfer	1 July 2025	
38	MF	(Germany) Kjell Wätjen	(Germany) VfL Bochum	Loan	1 July 2025	
2	DF	(Brazil) Yan Couto	(England) Manchester City	End of loan	1 July 2025	
24	DF	(Sweden) Daniel Svensson	(Denmark) Nordsjælland	End of loan	1 July 2025	
17	MF	(England) Carney Chukwuemeka	(England) Chelsea	End of loan	5 July 2025	
43	FW	(England) Jamie Gittens	(England) Chelsea	€64,300,000	5 July 2025	
44	DF	(France) Soumaïla Coulibaly	(France) Strasbourg	€7,500,000	7 July 2025	
–	DF	(Spain) Guille Bueno	(Spain) Valladolid	€200,000	20 July 2025	
—	GK	(Germany) Diant Ramaj	(Germany) 1. FC Heidenheim	Loan	28 July 2025	
28	FW	(Ivory Coast) Sébastien Haller	(Netherlands) Utrecht	Free transfer	18 August 2025	
21	MF	(United States) Giovanni Reyna	(Germany) Borussia Mönchengladbach	€4,000,000	23 August 2025	
13	MF	(Germany) Pascal Groß	(England) Brighton & Hove Albion	€2,000,000	2 January 2026	
32	FW	(Curaçao) Jordi Paulina	(Germany) Fortuna Düsseldorf	€350,000	3 January 2026	
37	FW	(United States) Cole Campbell	(Germany) TSG Hoffenheim	Loan	5 January 2026	
16	FW	(Belgium) Julien Duranville	(Switzerland) Basel	Loan	22 January 2026	
28	DF	(Argentina) Aarón Anselmino	(England) Chelsea	End of loan	25 January 2026	

== Friendlies ==
=== Pre-season ===
30 July 2025 Friendly	Sportfreunde Siegen	1–8	Borussia Dortmund	Siegen, Germany
20:45 CEST (UTC+2)	Santo 44'	Report	Benkara 13'; Couto 16'; Sabitzer 25'; Adeyemi 28'; Brandt 35', 37'; Beier 66'; Azhil 71'	Stadium: Leimbachstadion; Attendance: 18,400; Referee: Leonidas Exuzidis

2 August 2025 Friendly	Borussia Dortmund	3–2	Lille	Iserlohn, Germany
17:00 CEST (UTC+2)	Groß 13'; Guirassy 41' (pen.); Adeyemi 68'	Report	Diakité (yellow card) 40'; Haraldsson 66'; Cossier (yellow card) 74'; Meunier 81'; Bodart (yellow card) 90+2'	Stadium: Hemberg Stadium; Attendance: 4,500; Referee: Yannick Rupert (Germany)

10 August 2025 Friendly	Borussia Dortmund	1–2	Juventus	Dortmund, Germany
17:30 CEST (UTC+2)	Groß (yellow card) 33'; Beier 89'	Report	João Mário (yellow card) 4'; Conceição (yellow card) 13'; Cambiaso 16', 53'	Stadium: Signal Iduna Park; Attendance: 81,365; Referee: Timo Gansloweit (Germany)

== Competitions ==
=== Overall record ===
Competition	First match	Last match	Starting round	Final position	Record							
Competition	First match	Last match	Starting round	Final position	Pld	W	D	L	GF	GA	GD	Win %
Bundesliga	23 August 2025	16 May 2026	Matchday 1	2nd	34	22	7	5	70	34	+36	64.71
DFB-Pokal	18 August 2025	2 December 2025	First round	Round of 16	3	1	1	1	2	2	+0	33.33
UEFA Champions League	16 September 2025	25 February 2026	League phase	Knockout phase play-offs	10	4	2	4	22	21	+1	40.00
Total					47	27	10	10	94	57	+37	57.45

Source: Soccerway

=== Bundesliga ===
==== League table ====
Pos	Team	Pld	W	D	L	GF	GA	GD	Pts	Qualification or relegation
1	Bayern Munich (C)	34	28	5	1	122	36	+86	89	Qualification for the Champions League league phase
2	Borussia Dortmund	34	22	7	5	70	34	+36	73	Qualification for the Champions League league phase
3	RB Leipzig	34	20	5	9	66	47	+19	65	Qualification for the Champions League league phase
4	VfB Stuttgart	34	18	8	8	71	49	+22	62	Qualification for the Champions League league phase
5	TSG Hoffenheim	34	18	7	9	65	52	+13	61	Qualification for the Europa League league phase (Note: The 2025–26 DFB-Pokal winners qualified for the Europa League league phase. Since the DFB-Pokal winners, Bayern Munich, qualified for the Champions League, the Europa League spot passed to the sixth-placed team, and the Conference League spot passed to the seventh-placed team.)

Source: Bundesliga
Rules for classification: 1) Points; 2) Goal difference; 3) Goals scored; 4) Head-to-head results; 5) Head-to-head away goals scored; 6) Away goals scored; 7) Play-off.
(Rules 4–6 only apply after home and away matches have been played between the tied teams.)
(C) Champions

==== Results summary ====
Overall								Home						Away					
Pld	W	D	L	GF	GA	GD	Pts	W	D	L	GF	GA	GD	W	D	L	GF	GA	GD
34	22	7	5	70	34	+36	73	13	2	2	40	16	+24	9	5	3	30	18	+12

Source: DFB

==== Results by round ====
Round	1	2	3	4	5	6	7	8	9	10	11	12	13	14	15	16	17	18	19	20	21	22	23	24	25	26	27	28	29	30	31	32	33	34
Ground	A	H	A	H	A	H	A	H	A	A	H	A	H	A	H	A	H	H	A	H	A	H	A	H	A	H	H	A	H	A	H	A	H	A
Result	D	W	W	W	W	D	L	W	W	D	D	W	W	D	W	D	W	W	W	W	W	W	D	L	W	W	W	W	L	L	W	L	W	W
Position	8	4	2	2	2	2	4	4	3	3	4	3	3	3	2	2	2	2	2	2	2	2	2	2	2	2	2	2	2	2	2	2	2	2
Points	1	4	7	10	13	14	14	17	20	21	22	25	28	29	32	33	36	39	42	45	48	51	52	52	55	58	61	64	64	64	67	67	70	73

Source: DFB
A = Away; H = Home; W = Win; D = Draw; L = Loss

==== Matches ====
The league fixtures were announced on 27 June 2025.

23 August 2025 1	FC St. Pauli	3–3	Borussia Dortmund	St. Pauli
18:30 CEST (UTC+2)	Dźwigała (yellow card) 22'; Smith (yellow card) 38', (goal) 89'; Hountondji 50'; Sinani 86' (pen.)	Report	Bensebaini (yellow card) 26'; Guirassy 34', (penalty missed) 39'; Couto (yellow card) 65'; Anton 67'; Brandt 74'; Mané (red card) 85'; Sabitzer (yellow card) 90+3'	Stadium: Millerntor-Stadion; Attendance: 29,546; Referee: Matthias Jöllenbeck

31 August 2025 2	Borussia Dortmund	3–0	Union Berlin	Dortmund
17:30 CEST (UTC+2)	Guirassy 44', 58'; Nmecha 81'	Report		Stadium: Signal Iduna Park; Attendance: 81,365; Referee: Daniel Schlager

13 September 2025 3	1. FC Heidenheim	0–2	Borussia Dortmund	Heidenheim
15:30 CEST (UTC+2)	Zivzivadze (red card) 21'; Gimber (yellow card) 39'; Schöppner (yellow card) 47'	Report	Adeyemi (yellow card) 27'; Guirassy 33', (yellow card) 85'; Ryerson (yellow card) 45+2'; Beier 45+6'	Stadium: Voith-Arena; Attendance: 15,000; Referee: Felix Zwayer

21 September 2025 4	Borussia Dortmund	1–0	VfL Wolfsburg	Dortmund
19:30 CEST (UTC+2)	Bensebaini (yellow card) 5'; Adeyemi 20'	Report		Stadium: Signal Iduna Park; Attendance: 81,365; Referee: Daniel Siebert

27 September 2025 5	Mainz 05	0–2	Borussia Dortmund	Mainz
15:30 CEST (UTC+2)	Amiri (yellow card) 50'; Zentner (red card) 67'; Nebel (yellow card) 90'	Report	Svensson 27'; Adeyemi 40'; Couto (yellow card) 43'	Stadium: Mewa Arena; Attendance: 33,305; Referee: Tobias Reichel

4 October 2025 6	Borussia Dortmund	1–1	RB Leipzig	Dortmund
15:30 CEST (UTC+2)	Schlotterbeck (yellow card) 6'; Couto 23'	Report	Baumgartner 7', (yellow card) 21'; Baku (yellow card) 54'; Banzuni (yellow card) 86'	Stadium: Signal Iduna Park; Attendance: 81,365; Referee: Sascha Stegemann

18 October 2025 7	Bayern Munich	2–1	Borussia Dortmund	Munich
18:30 CEST (UTC+2)	Kane 22'; Laimer (yellow card) 48'; Olise 79'	Report	Ryerson (yellow card) 20'; Anton (yellow card) 45'; Bensebaini (yellow card) 50'; Brandt 84'	Stadium: Allianz Arena; Attendance: 75,000; Referee: Bastian Dankert

25 October 2025 8	Borussia Dortmund	1–0	1. FC Köln	Dortmund
18:30 CEST (UTC+2)	Guirassy (yellow card) 63'; Beier (yellow card) 90+1', (goal) 90+6'	Report	Jóhannesson (yellow card) 44'; Sebulonsen (yellow card) 45'	Stadium: Signal Iduna Park; Attendance: 81,365; Referee: Benjamin Brand

31 October 2025 9	FC Augsburg	0–1	Borussia Dortmund	Augsburg
20:30 CET (UTC+1)	Rexhbeçaj (yellow card) 49'; Giannoulis (yellow card) 49'; Rieder (yellow card) 65'; Tietz (yellow card) 82'	Report	Guirassy 37'; Kobel (yellow card) 68'	Stadium: WWK Arena; Attendance: 30,660; Referee: Tobias Stieler

8 November 2025 10	Hamburger SV	1–1	Borussia Dortmund	Hamburg
15:30 CET (UTC+1)	Poulsen (yellow card) 12'; Königsdörffer 90+7'	Report	Chukwuemeka 64'; Adeyemi (yellow card) 90+4'	Stadium: Volksparkstadion; Attendance: 57,000; Referee: Tobias Reichel

22 November 2025 11	Borussia Dortmund	3–3	VfB Stuttgart	Dortmund
15:30 CET (UTC+1)	Can 34' (pen.); Beier 41', (yellow card) 81'; Adeyemi 89'	Report	Jeltsch (yellow card) 24'; Undav 47', 71', 90+1'	Stadium: Signal Iduna Park; Attendance: 81,365; Referee: Benjamin Brand

29 November 2025 12	Bayer Leverkusen	1–2	Borussia Dortmund	Leverkusen
18:30 CET (UTC+1)	Tillman (yellow card) 30'; Tapsoba (yellow card) 40'; Kofane 83'; García (yellow card) 90+4'	Report	Schlotterbeck (yellow card) 11'; Anselmino 41'; Ryerson (yellow card) 54'; Adeyemi 65'; Silva (yellow card) 82'; Couto (yellow card) 88'	Stadium: BayArena; Attendance: 30,210; Referee: Tobias Welz

7 December 2025 13	Borussia Dortmund	2–0	TSG Hoffenheim	Dortmund
17:30 CET (UTC+1)	Brandt 43'; Schlotterbeck 60'	Report	Bernardo (yellow card) 65'; Hajdari (yellow card) 68'	Stadium: Signal Iduna Park; Attendance: 81,365; Referee: Florian Badstübner

14 December 2025 14	SC Freiburg	1–1	Borussia Dortmund	Freiburg
15:30 CET (UTC+1)	Manzambi (yellow card) 11'; Eggestein (yellow card) 72'; Höler 75'; Kübler (yellow card) 90+6'	Report	Couto (yellow card) 11'; Bensebaini 31'; Bellingham (red card) 53'; Ryerson (yellow card) 83'	Stadium: Europa-Park Stadion; Attendance: 34,700; Referee: Felix Zwayer

19 December 2025 15	Borussia Dortmund	2–0	Borussia Mönchengladbach	Dortmund
20:30 CET (UTC+1)	Brandt 10'; Can (yellow card) 53'; Schlotterbeck (yellow card) 59'; Beier 90+7'	Report	Netz (yellow card) 90+5'	Stadium: Signal Iduna Park; Attendance: 81,365; Referee: Sven Jablonski

9 January 2026 16	Eintracht Frankfurt	3–3	Borussia Dortmund	Frankfurt
20:30 CET (UTC+1)	Uzun 22' (pen.); Theate (yellow card) 43'; Brown (yellow card) 67'; Ebnoutalib 71'; Kalimuendo (yellow card) 82'; Dahoud 90+2'	Report	Beier 10'; Anton (yellow card) 29'; Süle (yellow card) 41'; Nmecha 68'; Can (yellow card) 87'; Chukwuemeka 90+6'	Stadium: Deutsche Bank Park; Attendance: 59,500; Referee: Daniel Schlager

13 January 2026 17	Borussia Dortmund	3–0	Werder Bremen	Dortmund
20:30 CET (UTC+1)	Schlotterbeck 11'; Süle (yellow card) 23'; Sabitzer (yellow card) 54', (goal) 76'; Guirassy 83'	Report		Stadium: Signal Iduna Park; Attendance: 81,365; Referee: Daniel Siebert

17 January 2026 18	Borussia Dortmund	3–2	FC St. Pauli	Dortmund
15:30 CET (UTC+1)	Schlotterbeck (yellow card) 16'; Brandt 45+1'; Adeyemi 54'; Bellingham (yellow card) 69'; Can 90+5' (pen.)	Report	Smith (yellow card) 38'; Sands 62'; Jones 72'	Stadium: Signal Iduna Park; Attendance: 81,365; Referee: Harm Osmers

24 January 2026 19	Union Berlin	0–3	Borussia Dortmund	Berlin
18:30 CET (UTC+1)		Report	Can 10' (pen.), (yellow card) 59'; Schlotterbeck 54'; Beier 84'	Stadium: Stadion An der Alten Försterei; Attendance: 22,012; Referee: Robert Hartmann

1 February 2026 20	Borussia Dortmund	3–2	1. FC Heidenheim	Dortmund
17:30 CET (UTC+1)	Anton 44', (yellow card) 50'; Guirassy 68' (pen.), 69', (penalty missed) 85'; Kobel (yellow card) 90+8'	Report	Honsak (yellow card) 40'; Niehues 45+5', 48', (yellow card) 64'	Stadium: Signal Iduna Park; Attendance: 81,365; Referee: Matthias Jöllenbeck

7 February 2026 21	VfL Wolfsburg	1–2	Borussia Dortmund	Wolfsburg
15:30 CET (UTC+1)	Daghim (yellow card) 47'; Koulierakis 52'	Report	Brandt 38'; Schlotterbeck (yellow card) 51'; Guirassy 87'	Stadium: Volkswagen Arena; Attendance: 28,917; Referee: Timo Gerach

13 February 2026 22	Borussia Dortmund	4–0	Mainz 05	Dortmund
20:30 CET (UTC+1)	Guirassy 10', 42'; Beier 15'; Süle (yellow card) 23'; Bensebaini 84'; Chukwuemeka (yellow card) 86'; Silva (yellow card) 90+1'	Report	Widmer (yellow card) 9'; Posch (yellow card) 56'	Stadium: Signal Iduna Park; Attendance: 81,365; Referee: Tobias Welz

21 February 2026 23	RB Leipzig	2–2	Borussia Dortmund	Leipzig
18:30 CET (UTC+1)	Baumgartner 20', 39', (yellow card) 76'; Rômulo (yellow card) 30'; Lukeba (yellow card) 41'; Raum (yellow card) 90+3'	Report	Bensebaini (yellow card) 45+2'; Rômulo 50' (o.g.); Reggiani (yellow card) 54'; Ryerson (yellow card) 69'; Silva (yellow card) 78', (goal) 90+5'	Stadium: Red Bull Arena; Attendance: 47,800; Referee: Benjamin Brand

28 February 2026 24	Borussia Dortmund	2–3	Bayern Munich	Dortmund
18:30 CET (UTC+1)	Schlotterbeck (yellow card) 20', (goal) 26'; Svensson 83'	Report	Kane 54', 70' (pen.); Kimmich 87'	Stadium: Signal Iduna Park; Attendance: 81,365; Referee: Sven Jablonski

7 March 2026 25	1. FC Köln	1–2	Borussia Dortmund	Cologne
18:30 CET (UTC+1)	Simpson-Pusey (red card) 45+2'; Martel (yellow card) 86'; Kamiński 88'	Report	Guirassy 16'; Bensebaini (yellow card) 45+5'; Beier 60'	Stadium: RheinEnergieStadion; Attendance: 50,000; Referee: Daniel Siebert

14 March 2026 26	Borussia Dortmund	2–0	FC Augsburg	Dortmund
15:30 CET (UTC+1)	Adeyemi 13'; Reggiani 59'	Report		Stadium: Signal Iduna Park; Attendance: 81,365; Referee: Bastian Dankert

21 March 2026 27	Borussia Dortmund	3–2	Hamburger SV	Dortmund
18:30 CET (UTC+1)	Nmecha (penalty missed) 45'; Adeyemi (yellow card) 45+4'; Bensebaini 73' (pen.), 84' (pen.); Guirassy 78'; Ryerson (yellow card) 90+4'	Report	Otele 19', (yellow card) 69'; Sambi Lokonga 38'; Remberg (yellow card) 45+4'; Mikelbrencis (yellow card) 72'	Stadium: Signal Iduna Park; Attendance: 81,365; Referee: Matthias Jöllenbeck

4 April 2026 28	VfB Stuttgart	0–2	Borussia Dortmund	Stuttgart
18:30 CEST (UTC+2)	Hendriks (yellow card) 65'; Karazor (yellow card) 90+7'	Report	Chukwuemeka (yellow card) 29'; Sabitzer (yellow card) 71'; Adeyemi (yellow card) 80', (goal) 90+4'; Brandt 90+6'; Ryerson (yellow card) 90+7'	Stadium: MHPArena; Attendance: 60,000; Referee: Robert Schröder

11 April 2026 29	Borussia Dortmund	0–1	Bayer Leverkusen	Dortmund
15:30 CEST (UTC+2)	Bensebaini (yellow card) 5'; Guirassy (yellow card) 45'; Beier (yellow card) 63'	Report	Andrich 42'	Stadium: Signal Iduna Park; Attendance: 81,365; Referee: Deniz Aytekin

18 April 2026 30	TSG Hoffenheim	2–1	Borussia Dortmund	Sinsheim
15:30 CEST (UTC+2)	Burger (yellow card) 31'; Kramarić 42' (pen.), 90+8' (pen.); Prass (yellow card) 77'	Report	Schlotterbeck (yellow card) 84'; Guirassy 87'; Ryerson (yellow card) 90+7'; Inacio (yellow card) 90+10'	Stadium: Rhein-Neckar-Arena; Attendance: 30,150; Referee: Daniel Siebert

26 April 2026 31	Borussia Dortmund	4–0	SC Freiburg	Dortmund
17:30 CEST (UTC+2)	Beier 8'; Guirassy 14'; Bensebaini 32'; Bellingham (yellow card) 65'; Silva 87'	Report		Stadium: Signal Iduna Park; Attendance: 81,365; Referee: Robin Braun

3 May 2026 32	Borussia Mönchengladbach	1–0	Borussia Dortmund	Mönchengladbach
17:30 CEST (UTC+2)	Stöger (yellow card) 54'; Elvedi (yellow card) 87'; Tabaković 88', (yellow card) 90+1'	Report	Schlotterbeck (yellow card) 56'	Stadium: Borussia-Park; Attendance: 54,042; Referee: Florian Badstübner

8 May 2026 33	Borussia Dortmund	3–2	Eintracht Frankfurt	Dortmund
20:30 CEST (UTC+2)	Reggiani (yellow card) 21'; Guirassy 42'; Schlotterbeck 45+1'; Inacio 72', (yellow card) 90+1'; Kobel (yellow card) 90+4'	Report	Uzun 2'; Burkardt 87'	Stadium: Signal Iduna Park; Attendance: 81,365; Referee: Patrick Ittrich

16 May 2026 34	Werder Bremen	0−2	Borussia Dortmund	Bremen
15:30 CEST (UTC+2)		Report	Guirassy 60'; Couto 90+5'	Stadium: Weserstadion; Attendance: 41,800; Referee: Bastian Dankert

=== DFB-Pokal ===
The first round draw was held on 15 June 2025.

18 August 2025 First round	Rot-Weiss Essen	0–1	Borussia Dortmund	Essen
20:45 CEST (UTC+2)	Owusu (yellow card) 90+5'	Report	Svensson (yellow card) 76'; Guirassy 79'	Stadium: Stadion an der Hafenstraße; Attendance: 19,300; Referee: Frank Willenborg

28 October 2025 Second round	Eintracht Frankfurt	1–1 (a.e.t.) (2–4 p)	Borussia Dortmund	Frankfurt
18:30 CET (UTC+1)	Knauff 7'; Chaïbi (yellow card) 98'	Report	Anselmino (yellow card) 42'; Brandt 48'; Süle (yellow card) 59'; Silva (yellow card) 114'	Stadium: Deutsche Bank Park; Attendance: 59,300; Referee: Sven Jablonski
	Penalties
	Uzun (penalty scored); Dōan (penalty missed); Batshuayi (penalty scored); Chaïbi (penalty missed)		(penalty scored) Silva; (penalty scored) Süle; (penalty scored) Chukwuemeka; (penalty scored) Nmecha

2 December 2025 Round of 16	Borussia Dortmund	0–1	Bayer Leverkusen	Dortmund
21:00 CET (UTC+1)	Anton (yellow card) 68'; Bellingham (yellow card) 71'; Can (yellow card) 90'	Report	Maza 34'; Andrich (yellow card) 75'; Tillman (yellow card) 87'	Stadium: Signal Iduna Park; Attendance: 81,365; Referee: Tobias Stieler

=== UEFA Champions League ===
==== League phase ====
The draw for the league phase was held on 28 August 2025.

Pos	Team	Pld	W	D	L	GF	GA	GD	Pts	Qualification
15	(Italian Football Federation) Atalanta	8	4	1	3	10	10	0	13	Advance to knockout phase play-offs (seeded)
16	(German Football Association) Bayer Leverkusen	8	3	3	2	13	14	−1	12	Advance to knockout phase play-offs (seeded)
17	(German Football Association) Borussia Dortmund	8	3	2	3	19	17	+2	11	Advance to knockout phase play-offs (unseeded)
18	(Hellenic Football Federation) Olympiacos	8	3	2	3	10	14	−4	11	Advance to knockout phase play-offs (unseeded)
19	(Royal Belgian Football Association) Club Brugge	8	3	1	4	15	17	−2	10	Advance to knockout phase play-offs (unseeded)

Source: UEFA
Rules for classification: League phase tiebreakers

Round	1	2	3	4	5	6	7	8
Ground	A	H	A	A	H	H	A	H
Result	D	W	W	L	W	D	L	L
Position	15	7	6	14	6	10	16	17
Points	1	4	7	7	10	11	11	11

Source: UEFA
A = Away; H = Home; W = Win; D = Draw; L = Loss

16 September 2025 1	Juventus (Italy)	4–4	(Germany) Borussia Dortmund	Turin, Italy
21:00 CEST (UTC+2)	Yıldız 63'; Vlahović 67', 90+4'; Kelly 90+6'	Report	Anton (yellow card) 42'; Adeyemi 52'; Nmecha 65'; Couto 74'; Bensebaini 86' (pen.)	Stadium: Juventus Stadium; Attendance: 41,497; Referee: François Letexier (France)

1 October 2025 2	Borussia Dortmund (Germany)	4–1	(Spain) Athletic Bilbao	Dortmund, Germany
21:00 CEST (UTC+2)	Svensson 28'; Chukwuemeka 50'; Guirassy 82'; Beier (yellow card) 89'; Brandt 90+1'	Report	Paredes (yellow card) 43'; Gorosabel (yellow card) 59'; Guruzeta 61'	Stadium: Westfalenstadion; Attendance: 81,365; Referee: Szymon Marciniak (Poland)

21 October 2025 3	Copenhagen (Denmark)	2–4	(Germany) Borussia Dortmund	Copenhagen, Denmark
21:00 CEST (UTC+2)	Anton 33' (o.g.); Lerager (yellow card) 60'; Zague (yellow card) 89'; Daðason 90'	Report	Nmecha 20', 76'; Bensebaini 61' (pen.), (yellow card) 75'; Silva 87'	Stadium: Parken Stadium; Attendance: 35,058; Referee: Danny Makkelie (Netherlands)

5 November 2025 4	Manchester City (England)	4–1	(Germany) Borussia Dortmund	Manchester, England
20:00 GMT (UTC±0)	Foden 22', 57'; Haaland 29'; Savinho (yellow card) 78'; O'Reilly (yellow card) 85'; Cherki 90+1'	Report	Svensson (yellow card) 15'; Anton 72'	Stadium: City of Manchester Stadium; Attendance: 50,513; Referee: Szymon Marciniak (Poland)

25 November 2025 5	Borussia Dortmund (Germany)	4–0	(Spain) Villarreal	Dortmund, Germany
21:00 CET (UTC+1)	Guirassy 45+2', 54', (penalty missed) 54'; Adeyemi 58', (yellow card) 71'; Silva (penalty missed) 82'; Svensson 90+5'	Report	Foyth (red card) 50'	Stadium: Westfalenstadion; Attendance: 81,365; Referee: Davide Massa (Italy)

10 December 2025 6	Borussia Dortmund (Germany)	2–2	(Norway) Bodø/Glimt	Dortmund, Germany
21:00 CET (UTC+1)	Brandt 18', 51'; Adeyemi (yellow card) 90+5'	Report	Aleesami 42'; Hauge 75'	Stadium: Westfalenstadion; Attendance: 81,365; Referee: Erik Lambrechts (Belgium)

20 January 2026 7	Tottenham Hotspur (England)	2–0	(Germany) Borussia Dortmund	London, England
20:00 GMT (UTC±0)	Romero 14'; Solanke 37'; Gray (yellow card) 86'	Report	Svensson (red card) 24'; Ryerson (yellow card) 86'	Stadium: Tottenham Hotspur Stadium; Attendance: 52,713; Referee: Glenn Nyberg (Sweden)

28 January 2026 8	Borussia Dortmund (Germany)	0–2	(Italy) Inter Milan	Dortmund, Germany
21:00 CET (UTC+1)	Bensebaini (yellow card) 75'	Report	Akanji (yellow card) 56'; Dimarco 81'; Acerbi (yellow card) 90+1'; Diouf 90+4'	Stadium: Westfalenstadion; Attendance: 81,365; Referee: István Kovács (Romania)

==== Knockout phase ====
===== Knockout phase play-offs =====
The draw for the knockout phase play-offs was held on 30 January 2026.

17 February 2026 First leg	Borussia Dortmund (Germany)	2–0	(Italy) Atalanta	Dortmund, Germany
21:15 CET (UTC+1)	Guirassy 3'; Reggiani (yellow card) 18'; Beier 42'; Anton (yellow card) 48'	Report	Kossounou (yellow card) 40'; Djimsiti (yellow card) 40'; Scamacca (yellow card) 45+1'	Stadium: Westfalenstadion; Attendance: 76,900; Referee: Serdar Gözübüyük (Netherlands)
Note: The match was delayed by 15 minutes due to late team arrival caused by heavy traffic.

25 February 2026 Second leg	Atalanta (Italy)	4–1 (4–3 agg.)	(Germany) Borussia Dortmund	Bergamo, Italy
18:45 CET (UTC+1)	Scamacca 5'; Zappacosta 45'; Pašalić 57'; Hien (yellow card) 69'; Scalvini (red card) 90+7'; Samardžić 90+8' (pen.)	Report	Bensebaini (yellow card) 13' (yellow-red card) 90+7'; Can (yellow card) 53'; Silva (yellow card) 69'; Adeyemi 75'; Schlotterbeck (red card) 90+7'; Ryerson (yellow card) 90+9'	Stadium: Stadio Atleti Azzurri d'Italia; Attendance: 21,234; Referee: José María Sánchez Martínez (Spain)
Note: Scalvini and Schlotterbeck received red cards from the bench.

== Statistics ==
=== Appearances and goals ===
No.	Pos	Nat	Player	Total		Bundesliga		DFB-Pokal		Champions League	
No.	Pos	Nat	Player	Apps	Goals	Apps	Goals	Apps	Goals	Apps	Goals
Goalkeepers
1	GK	(Switzerland) SUI	Gregor Kobel	47	0	34	0	3	0	10	0
30	GK	(Germany) GER	Patrick Drewes	0	0	0	0	0	0	0	0
31	GK	(Germany) GER	Silas Ostrzinski	0	0	0	0	0	0	0	0
33	GK	(Germany) GER	Alexander Meyer	0	0	0	0	0	0	0	0
Defenders
2	DF	(Brazil) BRA	Yan Couto	27	3	11+8	2	1	0	5+2	1
3	DF	(Germany) GER	Waldemar Anton	44	3	32	2	3	0	9	1
4	DF	(Germany) GER	Nico Schlotterbeck	37	5	28	5	2	0	6+1	0
5	DF	(Algeria) ALG	Ramy Bensebaini	32	7	15+6	5	1+1	0	9	2
24	DF	(Sweden) SWE	Daniel Svensson	45	4	27+6	2	3	0	8+1	2
25	DF	(Germany) GER	Niklas Süle	13	0	7+4	0	0+1	0	1	0
26	DF	(Norway) NOR	Julian Ryerson	42	0	26+5	0	2	0	6+3	0
39	DF	(Italy) ITA	Filippo Mané	6	0	2+2	0	1	0	1	0
42	DF	(Germany) GER	Almugera Kabar	1	0	0+1	0	0	0	0	0
49	DF	(Italy) ITA	Luca Reggiani	9	1	6+2	1	0	0	1	0
Midfielders
6	MF	(Turkey) TUR	Salih Özcan	12	0	0+11	0	0+1	0	0	0
7	MF	(England) ENG	Jobe Bellingham	45	0	20+12	0	2+1	0	7+3	0
8	MF	(Germany) GER	Felix Nmecha	42	5	25+4	2	2+1	0	9+1	3
10	MF	(Germany) GER	Julian Brandt	41	11	17+12	7	1+2	1	6+3	3
17	MF	(Austria) AUT	Carney Chukwuemeka	38	3	8+20	2	1+1	0	1+7	1
20	MF	(Austria) AUT	Marcel Sabitzer	34	1	21+5	1	2	0	4+2	0
23	MF	(Germany) GER	Emre Can	16	3	7+2	3	1	0	2+4	0
Forwards
9	FW	(Guinea) GUI	Serhou Guirassy	46	22	27+6	17	1+2	1	9+1	4
14	FW	(Germany) GER	Maximilian Beier	44	10	24+8	9	2+1	0	7+2	1
21	FW	(Portugal) POR	Fábio Silva	39	3	7+21	2	1+1	0	2+7	1
27	FW	(Germany) GER	Karim Adeyemi	39	10	15+13	7	2	0	5+4	3
40	FW	(Italy) ITA	Samuele Inacio	7	1	4+3	1	0	0	0	0
41	FW	(United States) USA	Mathis Albert	1	0	0+1	0	0	0	0	0
Players transferred/loaned out during the season
13	MF	(Germany) GER	Pascal Groß	16	0	7+4	0	1+1	0	0+3	0
16	FW	(Belgium) BEL	Julien Duranville	0	0	0	0	0	0	0	0
21	MF	(United States) USA	Giovanni Reyna	0	0	0	0	0	0	0	0
28	DF	(Argentina) ARG	Aarón Anselmino	10	1	4+2	1	1	0	2+1	0
32	FW	(Curaçao) CUW	Jordi Paulina	0	0	0	0	0	0	0	0
37	FW	(United States) USA	Cole Campbell	1	0	0+1	0	0	0	0	0

Source: Competitions

=== Goalscorers ===
Rank	Pos.	No.	Nat.	Player	Bundesliga	DFB-Pokal	Champions League	Total
1	FW	9	(Guinea)	Serhou Guirassy	17	1	4	22
2	MF	10	(Germany)	Julian Brandt	7	1	3	11
3	FW	27	(Germany)	Karim Adeyemi	7	0	3	10
3	FW	14	(Germany)	Maximilian Beier	9	0	1	10
5	DF	5	(Algeria)	Ramy Bensebaini	5	0	2	7
6	DF	4	(Germany)	Nico Schlotterbeck	5	0	0	5
6	MF	8	(Germany)	Felix Nmecha	2	0	3	5
8	DF	24	(Sweden)	Daniel Svensson	2	0	2	4
9	MF	17	(Austria)	Carney Chukwuemeka	2	0	1	3
9	MF	23	(Germany)	Emre Can	3	0	0	3
9	DF	3	(Germany)	Waldemar Anton	2	0	1	3
9	FW	21	(Portugal)	Fábio Silva	2	0	1	3
9	DF	2	(Brazil)	Yan Couto	2	0	1	3
14	DF	28	(Argentina)	Aarón Anselmino	1	0	0	1
14	MF	20	(Austria)	Marcel Sabitzer	1	0	0	1
14	DF	49	(Italy)	Luca Reggiani	1	0	0	1
14	FW	40	(Italy)	Samuele Inacio	1	0	0	1
Own goals					1	0	0	0
Totals					70	2	22	94

=== Assists ===
Rank	Pos.	No.	Nat.	Player	Bundesliga	DFB-Pokal	Champions League	Total
1	DF	26	(Norway)	Julian Ryerson	14	1	2	17
2	FW	14	(Germany)	Maximilian Beier	8	0	1	9
3	FW	21	(Portugal)	Fábio Silva	5	0	1	6
3	MF	10	(Germany)	Julian Brandt	5	0	1	6
3	FW	27	(Germany)	Karim Adeyemi	5	0	1	6
6	FW	9	(Guinea)	Serhou Guirassy	1	0	3	4
6	MF	20	(Austria)	Marcel Sabitzer	2	0	2	4
8	DF	2	(Brazil)	Yan Couto	3	0	0	3
8	MF	8	(Germany)	Felix Nmecha	3	0	0	3
8	MF	7	(England)	Jobe Bellingham	2	0	1	3
8	DF	5	(Algeria)	Ramy Bensebaini	2	1	0	3
12	MF	13	(Germany)	Pascal Groß	1	0	1	2
12	MF	17	(Austria)	Carney Chukwuemeka	0	0	2	2
12	DF	24	(Sweden)	Daniel Svensson	2	0	0	2
15	FW	27	(Germany)	Karim Adeyemi	0	0	1	1
15	DF	4	(Germany)	Nico Schlotterbeck	1	0	0	1
15	DF	28	(Argentina)	Aarón Anselmino	0	0	1	1
15	DF	25	(Germany)	Niklas Süle	1	0	0	1
Totals					56	2	17	74

=== Attendance ===
Last updated on 1 July 2026.

Season	Game type	Bundesliga total	Bundesliga matches	Bundesliga average	DFB-Pokal total	DFB-Pokal matches	DFB-Pokal average	UEFA Champions League total	UEFA Champions League matches	UEFA Champions League average	Total	Matches	Average
2025–26	Home	1,383,205	17	81,365	81,365	1	81,365	402,360	5	80,472	1,866,930	23	81,171
2025–26	Away	699,642	17	41,155	78,600	2	39,300	201,015	5	40,203	979,257	24	40,802
2025–26	Neutral	0	0	—	0	0	—	0	0	—	0	0	—
2025–26	Total	2,082,847	34	61,260	159,965	3	53,322	603,375	10	60,338	2,846,187	47	60,557
