= 2024–25 Borussia Dortmund season =

Borussia Dortmund
2024–25 season
- Chairman: Lars Ricken (CEO)
- Head coach: Nuri Şahin (until 22 January); Mike Tullberg (caretaker, from 22 January until 2 February); Niko Kovač (from 2 February)
- Stadium: Westfalenstadion
- Bundesliga: 4th
- DFB-Pokal: Second round
- UEFA Champions League: Quarter-finals
- FIFA Club World Cup: Quarter-finals
- Top goalscorer: League: Serhou Guirassy (21); All: Serhou Guirassy (38)
- Highest home attendance: 81,365 (23 matches)
- Lowest home attendance: 80,300 v Sporting CP
- Average home league attendance: 81,365
- Biggest win: 7–1 vs Celtic (H); 6–0 vs Union Berlin (H)
- Biggest defeat: 1–5 vs VfB Stuttgart (A); 0–4 vs Barcelona (A)
| Home colours | Away colours | Cup / Europe colours |

The 2024–25 season was the 116th season in the existence of Borussia Dortmund, and the club's 49th consecutive season in the top flight of German football. In addition to the domestic league, the club also competed in the DFB-Pokal, the UEFA Champions League, and the newly expanded FIFA Club World Cup for the first time.

This season was the first since 2011–12 without midfielder and former club captain Marco Reus, and the first since 2018–19 without defender and former club captain Mats Hummels, who both departed after the end of their contracts, marking the first Borussia Dortmund season since 2006–07 without either of the two at the club.

== Summary ==
On 13 June, Dortmund announced the departure of coach Edin Terzić after spending two seasons in his second spell with the club.

On 22 January, Sebastian Kehl and CEO Lars Ricken announced Nuri Şahin would leave the club with immediate effect, after suffering 4 straight defeats in the first 4 games of 2025.

Niko Kovač, who was appointed on 2 February, led the club from eleventh place to a fourth-placed finish, securing qualification to the 2025–26 UEFA Champions League.

In the UEFA Champions League, BVB were unable to turn over the 4–0 away defeat against Barcelona despite a 3–1 win at the Signal-Iduna-Park on April 15, resulting in the club's elimination from the competition.

With 21 goals in the Bundesliga, Serhou Guirassy finished the season as the second highest goalscorer, for the second season running, behind Bayern Munich's Harry Kane with 26 goals.

In the 2025 FIFA Club World Cup, Dortmund were drawn into Group F alongside Fluminense, Ulsan HD and Mamelodi Sundowns.

== Players ==
=== First team squad ===
As of 10 June 2025

Note: Flags indicate national team as defined under FIFA eligibility rules; some limited exceptions apply. Players may hold more than one non-FIFA nationality.

| No. | Pos. | Nation | Player |
|---|---|---|---|
| 1 | GK | SUI | Gregor Kobel |
| 2 | DF | BRA | Yan Couto (on loan from Manchester City) |
| 3 | DF | GER | Waldemar Anton |
| 4 | DF | GER | Nico Schlotterbeck (3rd captain) |
| 5 | DF | ALG | Ramy Bensebaini |
| 6 | MF | TUR | Salih Özcan |
| 7 | MF | USA | Giovanni Reyna |
| 8 | MF | GER | Felix Nmecha |
| 9 | FW | GUI | Serhou Guirassy |
| 10 | MF | GER | Julian Brandt (vice-captain) |
| 13 | MF | GER | Pascal Groß |
| 14 | FW | GER | Maximilian Beier |
| 16 | FW | BEL | Julien Duranville |
| 17 | MF | ENG | Carney Chukwuemeka (on loan from Chelsea) |
| 20 | MF | AUT | Marcel Sabitzer |
| 23 | MF | GER | Emre Can (captain) |
| 24 | DF | SWE | Daniel Svensson (on loan from Nordsjælland) |

| No. | Pos. | Nation | Player |
|---|---|---|---|
| 25 | DF | GER | Niklas Süle |
| 26 | DF | NOR | Julian Ryerson |
| 27 | FW | GER | Karim Adeyemi |
| 31 | GK | GER | Silas Ostrzinski |
| 32 | FW | CUW | Jordi Paulina |
| 33 | GK | GER | Alexander Meyer |
| 35 | GK | POL | Marcel Lotka |
| 37 | FW | USA | Cole Campbell |
| 38 | MF | GER | Kjell Wätjen |
| 39 | DF | ITA | Filippo Mané |
| 42 | DF | GER | Almugera Kabar |
| 43 | MF | ENG | Jamie Gittens |
| 44 | DF | FRA | Soumaila Coulibaly |
| 46 | MF | GER | Ayman Azhil |
| 49 | DF | GER | Yannik Lührs |
| 77 | MF | ENG | Jobe Bellingham |

=== Out on loan ===
Note: Flags indicate national team as defined under FIFA eligibility rules; some limited exceptions apply. Players may hold more than one non-FIFA nationality.

| No. | Pos. | Nation | Player |
|---|---|---|---|
| — | GK | GER | Diant Ramaj (at Copenhagen until 30 June 2025) |
| — | DF | ESP | Guille Bueno (at Darmstadt 98 until 30 June 2025) |

| No. | Pos. | Nation | Player |
|---|---|---|---|
| — | FW | CIV | Sébastien Haller (at Utrecht until 30 June 2025) |
| — | FW | GER | Youssoufa Moukoko (at Nice until 30 June 2025) |

== Transfers ==
=== In ===
| No. | Pos. | Player | Transferred from | Fee | Date | Source |
|---|---|---|---|---|---|---|
| 7 | MF | (United States) Giovanni Reyna | (England) Nottingham Forest | Loan return | 1 July 2024 | |
| 36 | DF | (Germany) Tom Rothe | (Germany) Holstein Kiel | Loan return | 1 July 2024 | |
| 44 | DF | (France) Soumaila Coulibaly | (Belgium) Antwerp | Loan return | 1 July 2024 | |
| 3 | DF | (Germany) Waldemar Anton | (Germany) VfB Stuttgart | €22,500,000 | 8 July 2024 | |
| 9 | FW | (Guinea) Serhou Guirassy | (Germany) VfB Stuttgart | €18,000,000 | 18 July 2024 | |
| 13 | MF | (Germany) Pascal Groß | (England) Brighton & Hove Albion | €7,000,000 | 1 August 2024 | |
| 2 | DF | (Brazil) Yan Couto | (England) Manchester City | Loan | 3 August 2024 | |
| 14 | FW | (Germany) Maximilian Beier | (Germany) TSG Hoffenheim | €28,500,000 | 12 August 2024 | |
| — | FW | (Ivory Coast) Sébastien Haller | (Spain) Leganés | Loan return | 9 January 2025 | |
| 6 | MF | (Turkey) Salih Özcan | (Germany) VfL Wolfsburg | Loan return | 28 January 2025 | |
| 17 | MF | (England) Carney Chukwuemeka | (England) Chelsea | Loan | 3 February 2025 | |
| 24 | DF | (Sweden) Daniel Svensson | (Denmark) Nordsjælland | Loan | 3 February 2025 | |
| — | GK | (Germany) Diant Ramaj | (Netherlands) Ajax | €5,000,000 | 3 February 2025 | |
| 44 | DF | (France) Soumaila Coulibaly | (France) Brest | Loan return | 5 June 2025 | |
| 77 | MF | (England) Jobe Bellingham | (England) Sunderland | €30,500,000 | 10 June 2025 | |

=== Out ===
| No. | Pos. | Player | Transferred to | Fee | Date | Source |
|---|---|---|---|---|---|---|
| 2 | DF | (Spain) Mateu Morey | (Spain) Mallorca | Free transfer | 1 July 2024 | |
| 11 | MF | (Germany) Marco Reus | (United States) LA Galaxy | Free transfer | 1 July 2024 | |
| 15 | DF | (Germany) Mats Hummels | (Italy) Roma | Free transfer | 1 July 2024 | |
| 17 | DF | (Germany) Marius Wolf | (Germany) Augsburg | Free transfer | 1 July 2024 | |
| 47 | DF | (Germany) Antonios Papadopoulos | (Switzerland) Lugano | Free transfer | 1 July 2024 | |
| 48 | FW | (Germany) Samuel Bamba | (Germany) VfL Bochum | Free transfer | 1 July 2024 | |
| 10 | FW | (England) Jadon Sancho | (England) Manchester United | End of loan | 1 July 2024 | |
| 22 | DF | (Netherlands) Ian Maatsen | (England) Chelsea | End of loan | 1 July 2024 | |
| 30 | MF | (Germany) Ole Pohlmann | (Portugal) Rio Ave | €1,600,000 | 2 July 2024 | |
| 14 | FW | (Germany) Niclas Füllkrug | (England) West Ham United | €27,000,000 | 5 August 2024 | |
| 36 | DF | (Germany) Tom Rothe | (Germany) Union Berlin | €5,000,000 | 7 August 2024 | |
| — | FW | (Germany) Paris Brunner | (France) Monaco | €4,000,000 | 16 August 2024 | |
| 32 | MF | (Guinea) Abdoulaye Kamara | (England) Portsmouth | €1,700,000 | 20 August 2024 | |
| — | DF | (Spain) Guille Bueno | (Germany) Darmstadt 98 | Loan | 22 August 2024 | |
| 6 | MF | (Turkey) Salih Özcan | (Germany) VfL Wolfsburg | Loan | 28 August 2024 | |
| 18 | FW | (Germany) Youssoufa Moukoko | (France) Nice | Loan | 28 August 2024 | |
| 48 | DF | (France) Soumaïla Coulibaly | (France) Brest | Loan | 29 August 2024 | |
| 9 | FW | (Ivory Coast) Sébastien Haller | (Spain) Leganés | Loan | 30 August 2024 | |
| — | FW | (Ivory Coast) Sébastien Haller | (Netherlands) Utrecht | Loan | 9 January 2025 | |
| 21 | FW | (Netherlands) Donyell Malen | (England) Aston Villa | €25,000,000 | 14 January 2025 | |
| — | GK | (Germany) Diant Ramaj | (Denmark) Copenhagen | Loan | 3 February 2025 | |

== Friendlies ==
=== Pre-season ===
| 12 July 2024 Friendly | DEW21 Dream Team | 1–7 | Borussia Dortmund | Holzwickede, Germany |
| 18:00 CEST (UTC+2) | Toy 15' | Report | Nmecha 5', 7'; Kabar 65'; Moukoko 74', 83'; Azhil 78'; Brunner 89' | Stadium: Montanhydraulik-Stadion; Attendance: 5,000 |

| 17 July 2024 Friendly | Erzgebirge Aue | 1–1 | Borussia Dortmund | Aue, Germany |
| 18:00 CEST (UTC+2) | Seitz 82' | Report | Benkara 21'; Adeyemi (yellow card) 41'; Meiser (yellow card) 50'; Brunner (yellow card) 85' | Stadium: Erzgebirgsstadion; Attendance: 15,700; Referee: Daniel Bartnitzki |

| 21 July 2024 Friendly | BG Pathum United | 4–0 | Borussia Dortmund | Pathum Thani, Thailand |
| 20:00 ICT (UTC+7) | Lorenzen 15'; Dangda 44'; Wonggorn 65', 88' | Report | | Stadium: BG Stadium; Attendance: 14,114; Referee: Torpong Somsingha (Thailand) |

| 24 July 2024 EuroJapan Cup | Cerezo Osaka | 2–3 | Borussia Dortmund | Osaka, Japan |
| 19:15 JST (UTC+9) | Shibayama 66'; Sakata 73' | Report | Adeyemi 26', 30'; Gittens 29' | Stadium: Nagai Stadium; Attendance: 15,646; Referee: Akihiko Ikeuchi (Japan) |

| 6 August 2024 Friendly | Borussia Dortmund | 2–2 | Villarreal | Altach, Austria |
| 18:30 CEST (UTC+2) | Adeyemi (yellow card) 6'; Gittens 72'; Sabitzer 107' | Report | Terrats 30'; Suárez 48' | Stadium: Stadion Schnabelholz; Referee: Walter Altmann (Austria) |
Note: The match was played in four periods of thirty minutes each.

| 10 August 2024 Friendly | Borussia Dortmund | 2–0 | Aston Villa | Dortmund, Germany |
| 17:00 CEST (UTC+2) | Can 33' (pen.); Brandt 35' | Report | | Stadium: Signal Iduna Park; Attendance: 81,365; Referee: Bastian Börner (Germany) |

== Competitions ==
=== Overall record ===
| Competition | First match | Last match | Starting round | Final position | Record | | | | | | | |
| Competition | First match | Last match | Starting round | Final position | Pld | W | D | L | GF | GA | GD | Win % |
|---|---|---|---|---|---|---|---|---|---|---|---|---|
| Bundesliga | 23 August 2024 | 17 May 2025 | Matchday 1 | 4th | 34 | 17 | 6 | 11 | 71 | 51 | +20 | 50.00 |
| DFB-Pokal | 17 August 2024 | 29 October 2024 | First round | Second round | 2 | 1 | 0 | 1 | 4 | 2 | +2 | 50.00 |
| UEFA Champions League | 18 September 2024 | 15 April 2025 | League phase | Quarter-finals | 14 | 8 | 2 | 4 | 31 | 19 | +12 | 57.14 |
| FIFA Club World Cup | 17 June 2025 | 5 July 2025 | Group stage | Quarter-finals | 5 | 3 | 1 | 1 | 9 | 7 | +2 | 60.00 |
| Total | | | | | 55 | 29 | 9 | 17 | 115 | 79 | +36 | 52.73 |

Source: Soccerway

=== Bundesliga ===
==== League table ====
| Pos | Team | Pld | W | D | L | GF | GA | GD | Pts | Qualification or relegation |
|---|---|---|---|---|---|---|---|---|---|---|
| 2 | Bayer Leverkusen | 34 | 19 | 12 | 3 | 72 | 43 | +29 | 69 | Qualification for the Champions League league phase |
| 3 | Eintracht Frankfurt | 34 | 17 | 9 | 8 | 68 | 46 | +22 | 60 | Qualification for the Champions League league phase |
| 4 | Borussia Dortmund | 34 | 17 | 6 | 11 | 71 | 51 | +20 | 57 | Qualification for the Champions League league phase |
| 5 | SC Freiburg | 34 | 16 | 7 | 11 | 49 | 53 | −4 | 55 | Qualification for the Europa League league phase |
| 6 | Mainz 05 | 34 | 14 | 10 | 10 | 55 | 43 | +12 | 52 | Qualification for the Conference League play-off round |

Source: Bundesliga
Rules for classification: 1) Points; 2) Goal difference; 3) Goals scored; 4) Head-to-head results; 5) Head-to-head away goals scored; 6) Away goals scored; 7) Play-off.
(Rules 4–6 only apply after home and away matches have been played between the tied teams.)

==== Results summary ====
| Overall | | | | | | | | Home | | | | | | Away | | | | | |
| Pld | W | D | L | GF | GA | GD | Pts | W | D | L | GF | GA | GD | W | D | L | GF | GA | GD |
|---|---|---|---|---|---|---|---|---|---|---|---|---|---|---|---|---|---|---|---|
| 34 | 17 | 6 | 11 | 71 | 51 | +20 | 57 | 11 | 3 | 3 | 44 | 19 | +25 | 6 | 3 | 8 | 27 | 32 | −5 |

Source: DFB

==== Results by round ====
| Round | 1 | 2 | 3 | 4 | 5 | 6 | 7 | 8 | 9 | 10 | 11 | 12 | 13 | 14 | 15 | 16 | 17 | 18 | 19 | 20 | 21 | 22 | 23 | 24 | 25 | 26 | 27 | 28 | 29 | 30 | 31 | 32 | 33 | 34 |
|---|---|---|---|---|---|---|---|---|---|---|---|---|---|---|---|---|---|---|---|---|---|---|---|---|---|---|---|---|---|---|---|---|---|---|
| Ground | H | A | H | A | H | A | H | A | H | A | H | H | A | H | A | H | A | A | H | A | H | A | H | A | H | A | H | A | A | H | A | H | A | H |
| Result | W | D | W | L | W | L | W | L | W | L | W | D | D | D | W | L | L | L | D | W | L | L | W | W | L | L | W | W | D | W | W | W | W | W |
| Position | 2 | 4 | 2 | 8 | 5 | 7 | 7 | 7 | 5 | 7 | 5 | 5 | 6 | 8 | 6 | 8 | 10 | 10 | 11 | 11 | 11 | 11 | 10 | 10 | 10 | 11 | 10 | 8 | 8 | 7 | 6 | 5 | 5 | 4 |
| Points | 3 | 4 | 7 | 7 | 10 | 10 | 13 | 13 | 16 | 16 | 19 | 20 | 21 | 22 | 25 | 25 | 25 | 25 | 26 | 29 | 29 | 29 | 32 | 35 | 35 | 35 | 38 | 41 | 42 | 45 | 48 | 51 | 54 | 57 |

Source: DFB
A = Away; H = Home; W = Win; D = Draw; L = Loss

==== Matches ====
The league fixtures were announced on 4 July 2024.

| 24 August 2024 1 | Borussia Dortmund | 2–0 | Eintracht Frankfurt | Dortmund |
| 18:30 CEST (UTC+2) | Gittens 72', 90+3' | Report | Skhiri (yellow card) 86' | Stadium: Signal Iduna Park; Attendance: 81,365; Referee: Felix Zwayer |

| 31 August 2024 2 | Werder Bremen | 0–0 | Borussia Dortmund | Bremen |
| 15:30 CEST (UTC+2) | Weiser (yellow card) 41'; Friedl (yellow card) 59' | Report | Anton (yellow card) 29'; Süle (yellow card) 34'; Ryerson (yellow card) 48'; Schlotterbeck (yellow card) 53' (yellow-red card) 73'; Bensebaini (yellow card) 85'; Groß (yellow card) 90+1' | Stadium: Weserstadion; Attendance: 42,100; Referee: Robert Hartmann |

| 13 September 2024 3 | Borussia Dortmund | 4–2 | 1. FC Heidenheim | Dortmund |
| 20:30 CEST (UTC+2) | Malen 12'; Adeyemi 17', 41'; Gittens (yellow card) 82'; Couto (yellow card) 86'; Can 90+3' (pen.) | Report | Pieringer 39'; Wanner (yellow card) 63'; Breunig 74' (pen.); Kaufmann (yellow card) 83' | Stadium: Signal Iduna Park; Attendance: 81,365; Referee: Robert Schröder |

| 22 September 2024 4 | VfB Stuttgart | 5–1 | Borussia Dortmund | Stuttgart |
| 17:30 CEST (UTC+2) | Undav 4', 90'; Leweling (yellow card) 17'; Demirović 21'; Millot 62'; Touré 80' | Report | Can (yellow card) 73'; Guirassy 75'; Sabitzer (yellow card) 77'; Bensebaini (yellow card) 81' | Stadium: MHPArena; Attendance: 60,000; Referee: Florian Badstübner |

| 27 September 2024 5 | Borussia Dortmund | 4–2 | VfL Bochum | Dortmund |
| 20:30 CEST (UTC+2) | Guirassy 44', 75'; Couto (yellow card) 58'; Can 62' (pen.); Groß (yellow card) 70'; Nmecha 81' | Report | Bero 16'; De Wit 21' | Stadium: Signal Iduna Park; Attendance: 81,365; Referee: Felix Brych |

| 5 October 2024 6 | Union Berlin | 2–1 | Borussia Dortmund | Berlin |
| 15:30 CEST (UTC+2) | Vogt (yellow card) 15', (goal) 26' (pen.); Jeong (yellow card) 41'; Vertessen 45'; Rothe (yellow card) 84'; Trimmel (yellow card) 89' | Report | Schlotterbeck (yellow card) 17'; Ryerson 62'; Sabitzer (yellow card) 83'; Anton (yellow card) 90+4'; Bensebaini (yellow card) 90+6' | Stadium: Stadion An der Alten Försterei; Attendance: 22,000; Referee: Tobias Reichel |

| 18 October 2024 7 | Borussia Dortmund | 2–1 | FC St. Pauli | Dortmund |
| 20:30 CEST (UTC+2) | Bensebaini 43'; Gittens (yellow card) 75'; Brandt (yellow card) 77'; Guirassy 83' | Report | Smith (yellow card) 40', (goal) 78' | Stadium: Signal Iduna Park; Attendance: 81,365; Referee: Matthias Jöllenbeck |

| 26 October 2024 8 | FC Augsburg | 2–1 | Borussia Dortmund | Augsburg |
| 15:30 CET (UTC+2) | Claude-Maurice 25', 50'; Giannoulis (yellow card) 42'; Tietz (yellow card) 73'; Gouweleeuw (yellow card) 87' | Report | Malen 4'; Kabar (yellow card) 71' (yellow-red card) 90+9'; Bensebaini (yellow card) 90+4' | Stadium: WWK Arena; Attendance: 30,660; Referee: Tobias Welz |

| 2 November 2024 9 | Borussia Dortmund | 2–1 | RB Leipzig | Dortmund |
| 18:30 CET (UTC+1) | Beier (yellow card) 21', (goal) 30'; Bensebaini (yellow card) 34'; Guirassy 65'; Azhil (yellow card) 90+7' | Report | Baumgartner (yellow card) 8'; Šeško 27'; Henrichs (yellow card) 35'; Geertruida (yellow card) 40'; Kampl (yellow card) 81' | Stadium: Signal Iduna Park; Attendance: 81,365; Referee: Tobias Stieler |

| 9 November 2024 10 | Mainz 05 | 3–1 | Borussia Dortmund | Mainz |
| 15:30 CET (UTC+1) | Nebel (yellow card) 32', (goal) 54'; Lee Jae-sung 36'; Kohr (yellow card) 45'; Burkardt 45+3'; Zentner (yellow card) 86' | Report | Can (red card) 27'; Schlotterbeck (yellow card) 28'; Guirassy 40' (pen.) | Stadium: Mewa Arena; Attendance: 33,000; Referee: Florian Badstübner |

| 23 November 2024 11 | Borussia Dortmund | 4–0 | SC Freiburg | Dortmund |
| 15:30 CET (UTC+1) | Beier 7'; Nmecha 40'; Brandt 66'; Gittens 77'; Couto (yellow card) 80' | Report | Osterhage (yellow card) 58' (yellow-red card) 63'; Adamu (red card) 90+3' | Stadium: Signal Iduna Park; Attendance: 81,365; Referee: Felix Brych |

| 30 November 2024 12 | Borussia Dortmund | 1–1 | Bayern Munich | Dortmund |
| 18:30 CET (UTC+1) | Gittens 27'; Ryerson (yellow card) 71'; Beier (yellow card) 90+5' | Report | Musiala 85'; Sané (yellow card) 88'; Upamecano (yellow card) 90+3' | Stadium: Signal Iduna Park; Attendance: 81,365; Referee: Sven Jablonski |

| 7 December 2024 13 | Borussia Mönchengladbach | 1–1 | Borussia Dortmund | Mönchengladbach |
| 18:30 CET (UTC+1) | Weigl (yellow card) 30'; Stöger 71' (pen.); Čvančara (yellow card) 90+4' (yellow-red card) 90+5' | Report | Schlotterbeck (yellow card) 47'; Gittens 65'; Groß (yellow card) 70' | Stadium: Borussia-Park; Attendance: 54,042; Referee: Tobias Stieler |

| 15 December 2024 14 | Borussia Dortmund | 1–1 | TSG Hoffenheim | Dortmund |
| 17:30 CET (UTC+1) | Groß (yellow card) 26'; Nmecha (yellow card) 44'; Reyna 46', (yellow card) 73'; Gittens (yellow card) 76'; Adeyemi (yellow card) 90+5' | Report | Gendrey (yellow card) 21'; Bruun Larsen 90+1'; Geiger (yellow card) 90+4' | Stadium: Signal Iduna Park; Attendance: 81,365; Referee: Harm Osmers |

| 22 December 2024 15 | VfL Wolfsburg | 1–3 | Borussia Dortmund | Wolfsburg |
| 17:30 CET (UTC+1) | Koulierakis (yellow card) 50'; Gerhardt (yellow card) 55'; Vavro 58', (yellow card) 70' | Report | Malen 25', (yellow card) 63'; Beier 28'; Brandt 30'; Groß (red card) 62'; Couto (yellow card) 90+4' | Stadium: Volkswagen Arena; Attendance: 28,917; Referee: Matthias Jöllenbeck |

| 10 January 2025 16 | Borussia Dortmund | 2–3 | Bayer Leverkusen | Dortmund |
| 20:30 CET (UTC+1) | Gittens 12'; Guirassy 79' (pen.); Nmecha (yellow card) 90+5' | Report | Tella 1'; Schick 8', 19', (yellow card) 45+3'; Tapsoba (yellow card) 78' | Stadium: Signal Iduna Park; Attendance: 81,365; Referee: Tobias Stieler |

| 14 January 2025 17 | Holstein Kiel | 4–2 | Borussia Dortmund | Kiel |
| 18:30 CET (UTC+1) | Machino 27'; Harres 32'; Bernhardsson 45+4'; Porath (yellow card) 81'; Holtby (red card) 86'; Arp 90+8', (yellow card) 90+9' | Report | Duranville (yellow card) 42'; Reyna 71'; Gittens 77'; Anton (yellow card) 86' | Stadium: Holstein-Stadion; Attendance: 15,034; Referee: Martin Petersen |

| 17 January 2025 18 | Eintracht Frankfurt | 2–0 | Borussia Dortmund | Frankfurt |
| 20:30 CET (UTC+1) | Ekitike 18'; Højlund 90+2' | Report | Can (yellow card) 77'; Guirassy (yellow card) 78' | Stadium: Deutsche Bank Park; Attendance: 58,000; Referee: Daniel Schlager |

| 25 January 2025 19 | Borussia Dortmund | 2–2 | Werder Bremen | Dortmund |
| 15:30 CET (UTC+1) | Ryerson (yellow card) 10'; Schlotterbeck (red card) 21'; Guirassy 28'; Friedl 51' (o.g.) | Report | Bittencourt (yellow card) 63', (goal) 65'; Ducksch 72'; Njinmah (yellow card) 79'; Stage (yellow card) 87'; Friedl (yellow card) 89' | Stadium: Signal Iduna Park; Attendance: 81,365; Referee: Christian Dingert |

| 1 February 2025 20 | 1. FC Heidenheim | 1–2 | Borussia Dortmund | Heidenheim |
| 15:30 CET (UTC+1) | Föhrenbach (yellow card) 38'; Honsak 64' | Report | Duranville (yellow card) 14'; Guirassy 33', (yellow card) 90+3'; Beier 63'; Reyna (yellow card) 88'; Kobel (yellow card) 90+1' | Stadium: Voith-Arena; Attendance: 15,000; Referee: Frank Willenborg |

| 8 February 2025 21 | Borussia Dortmund | 1–2 | VfB Stuttgart | Dortmund |
| 15:30 CET (UTC+1) | Can (yellow card) 17'; Ryerson (yellow card) 56' (yellow-red card) 89'; Adeyemi (yellow card) 60'; Brandt 81'; Duranville (yellow card) 90+2' | Report | Anton 50' (o.g.); Chabot 61'; Stiller (yellow card) 89'; Karazor (yellow card) 90+6' | Stadium: Signal Iduna Park; Attendance: 81,365; Referee: Jan Seidel |

| 15 February 2025 22 | VfL Bochum | 2–0 | Borussia Dortmund | Bochum |
| 15:30 CET (UTC+1) | Masouras 33', 35'; Bernardo (yellow card) 49' | Report | | Stadium: Vonovia Ruhrstadion; Attendance: 26,000; Referee: Harm Osmers |

| 22 February 2025 23 | Borussia Dortmund | 6–0 | Union Berlin | Dortmund |
| 18:30 CET (UTC+1) | Leite 25' (o.g.); Guirassy 40', 75', 80', 83'; Bensebaini (yellow card) 50'; Reyna (yellow card) 58'; Beier 89' | Report | Khedira (yellow card) 17'; Tousart (yellow card) 56' | Stadium: Signal Iduna Park; Attendance: 81,365; Referee: Bastian Dankert |

| 1 March 2025 24 | FC St. Pauli | 0–2 | Borussia Dortmund | St. Pauli |
| 15:30 CET (UTC+1) | Ceesay (yellow card) 79' | Report | Schlotterbeck (yellow card) 13'; Guirassy 50'; Adeyemi 58', (yellow card) 83' | Stadium: Millerntor-Stadion; Attendance: 29,546; Referee: Tobias Stieler |

| 8 March 2025 25 | Borussia Dortmund | 0–1 | FC Augsburg | Dortmund |
| 15:30 CET (UTC+1) | Guirassy (yellow card) 57' | Report | Gouweleeuw 23'; Rexhbeçaj (yellow card) 57'; Onyeka (yellow card) 70'; Jakić (yellow card) 84' | Stadium: Signal Iduna Park; Attendance: 81,365; Referee: Deniz Aytekin |

| 15 March 2025 26 | RB Leipzig | 2–0 | Borussia Dortmund | Leipzig |
| 18:30 CET (UTC+1) | Simons 18'; Openda 48'; Raum (yellow card) 63'; Haidara (yellow card) 86'; Lukeba (yellow card) 86' | Report | Can (yellow card) 10'; Ryerson (yellow card) 45+1'; Chukwuemeka (yellow card) 83' | Stadium: Red Bull Arena; Attendance: 47,800; Referee: Matthias Jöllenbeck |

| 30 March 2025 27 | Borussia Dortmund | 3–1 | Mainz 05 | Dortmund |
| 17:30 CEST (UTC+2) | Beier 39', 72'; Can 42'; Couto (yellow card) 45'; Schlotterbeck (yellow card) 89' | Report | Nebel 76' | Stadium: Signal Iduna Park; Attendance: 81,365; Referee: Daniel Schlager |

| 5 April 2025 28 | SC Freiburg | 1–4 | Borussia Dortmund | Freiburg |
| 15:30 CEST (UTC+2) | Ginter (yellow card) 65'; Eggestein 88' | Report | Adeyemi 34'; Chukwuemeka 51'; Guirassy 68'; Gittens 78' | Stadium: Europa-Park Stadion; Attendance: 34,700; Referee: Felix Zwayer |

| 12 April 2025 29 | Bayern Munich | 2–2 | Borussia Dortmund | Munich |
| 18:30 CEST (UTC+2) | Guerreiro 65'; Gnabry 69' | Report | Beier 49'; Anton 75' | Stadium: Allianz Arena; Attendance: 75,000; Referee: Tobias Welz |

| 20 April 2025 30 | Borussia Dortmund | 3–2 | Borussia Mönchengladbach | Dortmund |
| 17:30 CEST (UTC+2) | Guirassy 41', (yellow card) 56'; Nmecha 44'; Svensson 45+5' | Report | Scally (yellow card) 4'; Itakura 24'; Stöger 56' (pen.), (yellow card) 56' | Stadium: Signal Iduna Park; Attendance: 81,365; Referee: Daniel Siebert |

| 26 April 2025 31 | TSG Hoffenheim | 2–3 | Borussia Dortmund | Sinsheim |
| 15:30 CEST (UTC+2) | Hložek 61'; Chaves (yellow card) 64'; Kadeřábek 90+1', (yellow card) 90+8'; Nsoki (yellow card) 90+7'; Stach (yellow card) 90+12'; Tohumcu (yellow card) 90+13' | Report | Guirassy 20', (penalty missed) 34'; Anton (yellow card) 42', (goal) 90+5'; Brandt 74' | Stadium: Rhein-Neckar-Arena; Attendance: 30,150; Referee: Benjamin Brand |

| 3 May 2025 32 | Borussia Dortmund | 4–0 | VfL Wolfsburg | Dortmund |
| 18:30 CEST (UTC+2) | Guirassy 3', 59'; Adeyemi 69', 73' | Report | Fischer (yellow card) 59' | Stadium: Signal Iduna Park; Attendance: 81,365; Referee: Felix Brych |

| 11 May 2025 33 | Bayer Leverkusen | 2–4 | Borussia Dortmund | Leverkusen |
| 15:30 CEST (UTC+2) | Frimpong 30'; Hofmann 90+2' | Report | Groß (yellow card) 23'; Brandt 33'; Ryerson 43'; Nmecha (yellow card) 45+2'; Adeyemi 73'; Guirassy 77' | Stadium: BayArena; Attendance: 30,210; Referee: Deniz Aytekin |

| 17 May 2025 34 | Borussia Dortmund | 3–0 | Holstein Kiel | Dortmund |
| 15:30 CEST (UTC+2) | Guirassy 3' (pen.); Sabitzer 47', (yellow card) 90'; Adeyemi (yellow card) 56'; Nmecha 73'; Gittens (yellow card) 87' | Report | Johansson (red card) 9'; Remberg (yellow card) 87' | Stadium: Signal Iduna Park; Attendance: 81,365; Referee: Harm Osmers |

=== DFB-Pokal ===
The first round draw was held on 1 June 2024.

| 17 August 2024 First round | Phönix Lübeck | 1–4 | Borussia Dortmund | Hamburg |
| 18:00 CEST (UTC+2) | Ntika (yellow card) 30'; Berger (yellow card) 47'; Iloka 55' | Report | Anton 3'; Schlotterbeck (yellow card) 23'; Can 31' (pen.); Brandt 45+1'; Duranville 62' | Stadium: Volksparkstadion; Attendance: 50,971; Referee: Max Burda |

| 29 October 2024 Second round | VfL Wolfsburg | 1–0 (a.e.t.) | Borussia Dortmund | Wolfsburg |
| 20:45 CET (UTC+1) | Arnold (yellow card) 62'; Özcan (yellow card) 114'; Wind 117' | Report | Nmecha (yellow card) 56'; Gittens (yellow card) 86'; Schlotterbeck (yellow card) 115'; Bensebaini (yellow card) 120' | Stadium: Volkswagen Arena; Attendance: 30,000; Referee: Daniel Siebert |

=== UEFA Champions League ===
==== League phase ====
The draw for the league phase was held on 29 August 2024.

| Pos | Team | Pld | W | D | L | GF | GA | GD | Pts | Qualification |
|---|---|---|---|---|---|---|---|---|---|---|
| 8 | (The Football Association) Aston Villa | 8 | 5 | 1 | 2 | 13 | 6 | +7 | 16 | Advance to round of 16 (seeded) |
| 9 | (Italian Football Federation) Atalanta | 8 | 4 | 3 | 1 | 20 | 6 | +14 | 15 | Advance to knockout phase play-offs (seeded) |
| 10 | (German Football Association) Borussia Dortmund | 8 | 5 | 0 | 3 | 22 | 12 | +10 | 15 | Advance to knockout phase play-offs (seeded) |
| 11 | (Royal Spanish Football Federation) Real Madrid | 8 | 5 | 0 | 3 | 20 | 12 | +8 | 15 (Note: Tied on points (15), goal difference (+8), goals scored (20), away goals (6) and wins (5). Ranked on away wins: Real Madrid 2, Bayern Munich 1.) | Advance to knockout phase play-offs (seeded) |
| 12 | (German Football Association) Bayern Munich | 8 | 5 | 0 | 3 | 20 | 12 | +8 | 15 | Advance to knockout phase play-offs (seeded) |

Source: UEFA
Rules for classification: League phase tiebreakers
Notes:

| Round | 1 | 2 | 3 | 4 | 5 | 6 | 7 | 8 |
|---|---|---|---|---|---|---|---|---|
| Ground | A | H | A | H | A | H | A | H |
| Result | W | W | L | W | W | L | L | W |
| Position | 4 | 1 | 11 | 7 | 4 | 9 | 14 | 10 |
| Points | 3 | 6 | 6 | 9 | 12 | 12 | 12 | 15 |

Source: UEFA
A = Away; H = Home; W = Win; D = Draw; L = Loss

| 18 September 2024 1 | Club Brugge (Belgium) | 0–3 | (Germany) Borussia Dortmund | Bruges, Belgium |
| 21:00 CEST (UTC+2) | Vetlesen (yellow card) 53' | Report | Gittens 76', 86'; Ryerson (yellow card) 84'; Guirassy 90+5' (pen.) | Stadium: Jan Breydel Stadium; Attendance: 19,961; Referee: Irfan Peljto (Bosnia and Herzegovina) |

| 1 October 2024 2 | Borussia Dortmund (Germany) | 7–1 | (Scotland) Celtic | Dortmund, Germany |
| 21:00 CEST (UTC+2) | Can 7' (pen.); Adeyemi 11', 29', 42'; Groß (yellow card) 32'; Guirassy 40' (pen.), 66'; Nmecha 79'; Bensebaini (yellow card) 90+3' | Report | Schmeichel (yellow card) 6'; Maeda 9'; Hatate (yellow card) 74' | Stadium: Westfalenstadion; Attendance: 81,365; Referee: José María Sánchez Martínez (Spain) |

| 22 October 2024 3 | Real Madrid (Spain) | 5–2 | (Germany) Borussia Dortmund | Madrid, Spain |
| 21:00 CEST (UTC+2) | Rüdiger 60'; Vinícius 62', 86', 90+3', (yellow card) 87'; Vázquez 83' | Report | Malen 30'; Gittens 34' | Stadium: Santiago Bernabéu; Attendance: 74,642; Referee: István Kovács (Romania) |

| 5 November 2024 4 | Borussia Dortmund (Germany) | 1–0 | (Austria) Sturm Graz | Dortmund, Germany |
| 21:00 CET (UTC+1) | Malen (yellow card) 75', (goal) 85' | Report | | Stadium: Westfalenstadion; Attendance: 81,365; Referee: Erik Lambrechts (Belgium) |

| 27 November 2024 5 | Dinamo Zagreb (Croatia) | 0–3 | (Germany) Borussia Dortmund | Zagreb, Croatia |
| 21:00 CET (UTC+1) | Torrente (yellow card) 19'; Baturina (yellow card) 60'; Kulenović (yellow card) 66' | Report | Gittens 41'; Bensebaini 56', (yellow card) 60'; Guirassy 90' | Stadium: Stadion Maksimir; Attendance: 20,019; Referee: Clément Turpin (France) |

| 11 December 2024 6 | Borussia Dortmund (Germany) | 2–3 | (Spain) Barcelona | Dortmund, Germany |
| 21:00 CET (UTC+1) | Sabitzer (yellow card) 42'; Nmecha (yellow card) 51'; Couto (yellow card) 57'; Bensebaini (yellow card) 58'; Guirassy 60' (pen.), 78' | Report | Raphinha 53'; Cubarsí (yellow card) 58'; Torres 75', 85', (yellow card) 90+2' | Stadium: Westfalenstadion; Attendance: 81,365; Referee: François Letexier (France) |

| 21 January 2025 7 | Bologna (Italy) | 2–1 | (Germany) Borussia Dortmund | Bologna, Italy |
| 21:00 CET (UTC+1) | Holm (yellow card) 14'; Freuler (yellow card) 20'; Lucumí (yellow card) 60'; Dallinga 71'; Iling-Junior 72'; Ferguson (yellow card) 90' | Report | Guirassy 15' (pen.); Beier (yellow card) 62'; Adeyemi (yellow card) 81'; Couto (yellow card) 82'; Ryerson (yellow card) 89' | Stadium: Stadio Renato Dall'Ara; Attendance: 26,801; Referee: Serdar Gözübüyük (Netherlands) |

| 29 January 2025 8 | Borussia Dortmund (Germany) | 3–1 | (Ukraine) Shakhtar Donetsk | Dortmund, Germany |
| 21:00 CET (UTC+1) | Guirassy 17', 44'; Beier (yellow card) 27'; Bensebaini 79' | Report | Kevin (yellow card) 25'; Marlon Gomes 50', (yellow card) 58' | Stadium: Westfalenstadion; Attendance: 81,365; Referee: Glenn Nyberg (Sweden) |

==== Knockout phase ====
===== Knockout phase play-offs =====
The draw for the knockout phase play-offs was held on 31 January 2025.

| 11 February 2025 First leg | Sporting CP (Portugal) | 0–3 | (Germany) Borussia Dortmund | Lisbon, Portugal |
| 20:00 WET (UTC+0) | Trincão (yellow card) 78' | Report | Guirassy 60', (yellow card) 66'; Groß 68'; Adeyemi 82' | Stadium: Estádio José Alvalade; Attendance: 41,543; Referee: Espen Eskås (Norway) |

| 19 February 2025 Second leg | Borussia Dortmund (Germany) | 0–0 (3–0 agg.) | (Portugal) Sporting CP | Dortmund, Germany |
| 18:45 CET (UTC+1) | Guirassy (penalty missed) 59'; Sabitzer (yellow card) 74' | Report | | Stadium: Westfalenstadion; Attendance: 80,300; Referee: Davide Massa (Italy) |

===== Round of 16 =====
The draw for the round of 16 was held on 21 February 2025.

| 4 March 2025 First leg | Borussia Dortmund (Germany) | 1–1 | (France) Lille | Dortmund, Germany |
| 21:00 CET (UTC+1) | Adeyemi 22'; Can (yellow card) 61'; Groß (yellow card) 90+3' | Report | Haraldsson 68' | Stadium: Westfalenstadion; Attendance: 81,365; Referee: José María Sánchez Martínez (Spain) |

| 12 March 2025 Second leg | Lille (France) | 1–2 (2–3 agg.) | (Germany) Borussia Dortmund | Villeneuve-d'Ascq, France |
| 18:45 CET (UTC+1) | David 5'; Meunier (yellow card) 52'; Mukau (yellow card) 83' | Report | Anton (yellow card) 32'; Groß (yellow card) 51'; Can 54' (pen.); Beier 65'; Bensebaini (yellow card) 89' | Stadium: Stade Pierre-Mauroy; Attendance: 48,042; Referee: Sandro Schärer (Switzerland) |

===== Quarter-finals =====
The draw for the order of the quarter-final legs was held on 21 February 2025, after the draw for the round of 16.

| 9 April 2025 First leg | Barcelona (Spain) | 4–0 | (Germany) Borussia Dortmund | Barcelona, Spain |
| 21:00 CEST (UTC+2) | Raphinha 25'; Lewandowski 48', 66'; Yamal 77' | Report | Adeyemi (yellow card) 24'; Guirassy (yellow card) 74' | Stadium: Estadi Olímpic Lluís Companys; Attendance: 49,760; Referee: Espen Eskås (Norway) |
Note: The match was played at the Estadi Olímpic Lluís Companys in Barcelona, instead of Barcelona's regular stadium, the Camp Nou, which was being renovated.

| 15 April 2025 Second leg | Borussia Dortmund (Germany) | 3–1 (3–5 agg.) | (Spain) Barcelona | Dortmund, Germany |
| 21:00 CEST (UTC+2) | Guirassy 11' (pen.), 49', 76'; Nmecha (yellow card) 56' | Report | De Jong (yellow card) 35'; Bensebaini 54' (o.g.) | Stadium: Westfalenstadion; Attendance: 81,365; Referee: Maurizio Mariani (Italy) |

=== FIFA Club World Cup ===
==== Group stage ====
The draw for the group stage was held on 5 December 2024.

| Pos | Team | Pld | W | D | L | GF | GA | GD | Pts | Qualification |
|---|---|---|---|---|---|---|---|---|---|---|
| 1 | (Germany) Borussia Dortmund | 3 | 2 | 1 | 0 | 5 | 3 | +2 | 7 | Advance to knockout stage |
| 2 | (Brazil) Fluminense | 3 | 1 | 2 | 0 | 4 | 2 | +2 | 5 | Advance to knockout stage |
| 3 | (South Africa) Mamelodi Sundowns | 3 | 1 | 1 | 1 | 4 | 4 | 0 | 4 | |
| 4 | (South Korea) Ulsan HD | 3 | 0 | 0 | 3 | 2 | 6 | −4 | 0 | |

Source: FIFA
Rules for classification: Group stage tiebreakers

| 17 June 2025 1 | Fluminense (Brazil) | 0–0 | (Germany) Borussia Dortmund | East Rutherford, United States |
| 12:00 EDT (UTC−4) | Martinelli (yellow card) 9'; Nonato (yellow card) 81' | Report | Bensebaini (yellow card) 2'; Couto (yellow card) 90+4' | Stadium: MetLife Stadium; Attendance: 34,736; Referee: Ilgiz Tantashev (Uzbekistan) |

| 21 June 2025 2 | Mamelodi Sundowns (South Africa) | 3–4 | (Germany) Borussia Dortmund | Cincinnati, United States |
| 12:00 EDT (UTC−4) | Ribeiro 11'; Rayners 62'; Matthews (yellow card) 66'; Mothiba 90'; Allende (yellow card) 90+5' | Report | Nmecha 16'; Guirassy 34'; Bellingham 45'; Mudau 59' (o.g.); Chukwuemeka (yellow card) 64'; Beier (yellow card) 85' | Stadium: TQL Stadium; Attendance: 14,006; Referee: Juan Gabriel Benítez (Paraguay) |

| 25 June 2025 3 | Borussia Dortmund (Germany) | 1–0 | (South Korea) Ulsan HD | Cincinnati, United States |
| 15:00 EDT (UTC−4) | Bellingham (yellow card) 28'; Svensson 36'; Nmecha (yellow card) 53' | Report | Kim Min-hyeok (yellow card) 17'; Kang Sang-woo (yellow card) 54' | Stadium: TQL Stadium; Attendance: 8,239; Referee: Tori Penso (United States) |

==== Knockout stage ====
| 1 July 2025 Round of 16 | Borussia Dortmund (Germany) | 2–1 | (Mexico) Monterrey | Atlanta, United States |
| 21:00 EDT (UTC−4) | Guirassy 14', 24', (yellow card) 90+3'; Bellingham (yellow card) 28' | Report | Berterame 48' | Stadium: Mercedes-Benz Stadium; Attendance: 31,442; Referee: Facundo Tello (Argentina) |

| 5 July 2025 Quarter-finals | Real Madrid (Spain) | 3–2 | (Germany) Borussia Dortmund | East Rutherford, United States |
| 16:00 EDT (UTC−4) | G. García 10'; F. García 20'; Mbappé 90+4', (yellow card) 90+8'; Huijsen (red card) 90+5' | Report | Groß (yellow card) 37'; Couto (yellow card) 63'; Beier 90+3'; Guirassy 90+8' (pen.) | Stadium: MetLife Stadium; Attendance: 76,611; Referee: Ramon Abatti (Brazil) |

== Statistics ==
=== Appearances and goals ===
| No. | Pos | Nat | Player | Total | | Bundesliga | | DFB-Pokal | | Champions League | | Club World Cup | |
| No. | Pos | Nat | Player | Apps | Goals | Apps | Goals | Apps | Goals | Apps | Goals | Apps | Goals |
Goalkeepers
| 1 | GK | (Switzerland) SUI | Gregor Kobel | 52 | 0 | 32 | 0 | 2 | 0 | 13 | 0 | 5 | 0 |
| 31 | GK | (Germany) GER | Silas Ostrzinski | 0 | 0 | 0 | 0 | 0 | 0 | 0 | 0 | 0 | 0 |
| 33 | GK | (Germany) GER | Alexander Meyer | 4 | 0 | 2 | 0 | 0+1 | 0 | 1 | 0 | 0 | 0 |
| 35 | GK | (Poland) POL | Marcel Lotka | 0 | 0 | 0 | 0 | 0 | 0 | 0 | 0 | 0 | 0 |
Defenders
| 2 | DF | (Brazil) BRA | Yan Couto | 35 | 0 | 8+13 | 0 | 0+1 | 0 | 2+6 | 0 | 2+3 | 0 |
| 3 | DF | (Germany) GER | Waldemar Anton | 42 | 3 | 22+4 | 2 | 1 | 1 | 6+4 | 0 | 5 | 0 |
| 4 | DF | (Germany) GER | Nico Schlotterbeck | 37 | 0 | 23 | 0 | 2 | 0 | 12 | 0 | 0 | 0 |
| 5 | DF | (Algeria) ALG | Ramy Bensebaini | 49 | 3 | 23+8 | 1 | 1 | 0 | 8+4 | 2 | 5 | 0 |
| 24 | DF | (Sweden) SWE | Daniel Svensson | 21 | 2 | 8+4 | 1 | 0 | 0 | 4 | 0 | 5 | 1 |
| 25 | DF | (Germany) GER | Niklas Süle | 25 | 0 | 12+3 | 0 | 1 | 0 | 3+2 | 0 | 4 | 0 |
| 26 | DF | (Norway) NOR | Julian Ryerson | 47 | 2 | 27+2 | 2 | 1 | 0 | 11+1 | 0 | 4+1 | 0 |
| 39 | DF | (Italy) ITA | Filippo Mané | 0 | 0 | 0 | 0 | 0 | 0 | 0 | 0 | 0 | 0 |
| 42 | DF | (Germany) GER | Almugera Kabar | 5 | 0 | 1+4 | 0 | 0 | 0 | 0 | 0 | 0 | 0 |
| 44 | DF | (France) FRA | Soumaila Coulibaly | 0 | 0 | 0 | 0 | 0 | 0 | 0 | 0 | 0 | 0 |
| 49 | DF | (Germany) GER | Yannik Lührs | 3 | 0 | 1+2 | 0 | 0 | 0 | 0 | 0 | 0 | 0 |
Midfielders
| 6 | MF | (Turkey) TUR | Salih Özcan | 14 | 0 | 3+8 | 0 | 0 | 0 | 0+3 | 0 | 0 | 0 |
| 7 | MF | (United States) USA | Giovanni Reyna | 26 | 2 | 3+13 | 2 | 0 | 0 | 2+7 | 0 | 0+1 | 0 |
| 8 | MF | (Germany) GER | Felix Nmecha | 41 | 6 | 19+7 | 4 | 1 | 0 | 7+2 | 1 | 3+2 | 1 |
| 10 | MF | (Germany) GER | Julian Brandt | 50 | 6 | 28+2 | 5 | 2 | 1 | 11+2 | 0 | 3+2 | 0 |
| 13 | MF | (Germany) GER | Pascal Groß | 50 | 1 | 28+2 | 0 | 2 | 0 | 10+3 | 1 | 5 | 0 |
| 17 | MF | (England) ENG | Carney Chukwuemeka | 17 | 1 | 1+9 | 1 | 0 | 0 | 1+2 | 0 | 0+4 | 0 |
| 20 | MF | (Austria) AUT | Marcel Sabitzer | 43 | 1 | 18+8 | 1 | 1+1 | 0 | 10+1 | 0 | 2+2 | 0 |
| 23 | MF | (Germany) GER | Emre Can | 45 | 6 | 23+8 | 3 | 2 | 1 | 10+2 | 2 | 0 | 0 |
| 38 | MF | (Germany) GER | Kjell Wätjen | 2 | 0 | 0+2 | 0 | 0 | 0 | 0 | 0 | 0 | 0 |
| 46 | MF | (Germany) GER | Ayman Azhil | 2 | 0 | 0+1 | 0 | 0 | 0 | 0+1 | 0 | 0 | 0 |
| 77 | MF | (England) ENG | Jobe Bellingham | 4 | 1 | 0 | 0 | 0 | 0 | 0 | 0 | 3+1 | 1 |
Forwards
| 9 | FW | (Guinea) GUI | Serhou Guirassy | 50 | 38 | 29+1 | 21 | 1 | 0 | 12+2 | 13 | 5 | 4 |
| 14 | FW | (Germany) GER | Maximilian Beier | 46 | 10 | 17+12 | 8 | 1+1 | 0 | 6+6 | 1 | 0+3 | 1 |
| 16 | FW | (Belgium) BEL | Julien Duranville | 24 | 1 | 2+10 | 0 | 0+1 | 1 | 2+7 | 0 | 0+2 | 0 |
| 27 | FW | (Germany) GER | Karim Adeyemi | 41 | 12 | 17+8 | 7 | 1 | 0 | 9+1 | 5 | 4+1 | 0 |
| 32 | FW | (Netherlands) NED | Jordi Paulina | 1 | 0 | 0 | 0 | 0+1 | 0 | 0 | 0 | 0 | 0 |
| 37 | FW | (United States) USA | Cole Campbell | 6 | 0 | 0+4 | 0 | 0+1 | 0 | 0+1 | 0 | 0 | 0 |
| 43 | FW | (England) ENG | Jamie Gittens | 49 | 12 | 21+11 | 8 | 2 | 0 | 11+3 | 4 | 0+1 | 0 |
Players transferred/loaned out during the season
| — | GK | (Germany) GER | Diant Ramaj | 0 | 0 | 0 | 0 | 0 | 0 | 0 | 0 | 0 | 0 |
| 9 | FW | (Ivory Coast) CIV | Sébastien Haller | 0 | 0 | 0 | 0 | 0 | 0 | 0 | 0 | 0 | 0 |
| 18 | FW | (Germany) GER | Youssoufa Moukoko | 0 | 0 | 0 | 0 | 0 | 0 | 0 | 0 | 0 | 0 |
| 21 | FW | (Netherlands) NED | Donyell Malen | 21 | 5 | 6+8 | 3 | 1+1 | 0 | 3+2 | 2 | 0 | 0 |
| 32 | MF | (Guinea) GUI | Abdoulaye Kamara | 0 | 0 | 0 | 0 | 0 | 0 | 0 | 0 | 0 | 0 |

Source: Competitions

=== Goalscorers ===
| Rank | Pos. | No. | Nat. | Player | Bundesliga | DFB-Pokal | Champions League | Club World Cup | Total |
|---|---|---|---|---|---|---|---|---|---|
| 1 | FW | 9 | (Guinea) | Serhou Guirassy | 21 | 0 | 13 | 4 | 38 |
| 2 | FW | 27 | (Germany) | Karim Adeyemi | 7 | 0 | 5 | 0 | 12 |
| 2 | FW | 43 | (England) | Jamie Gittens | 8 | 0 | 4 | 0 | 12 |
| 4 | FW | 14 | (Germany) | Maximilian Beier | 8 | 0 | 1 | 1 | 10 |
| 5 | MF | 8 | (Germany) | Felix Nmecha | 4 | 0 | 1 | 1 | 6 |
| 5 | MF | 10 | (Germany) | Julian Brandt | 5 | 1 | 0 | 0 | 6 |
| 5 | MF | 23 | (Germany) | Emre Can | 3 | 1 | 2 | 0 | 6 |
| 8 | FW | 21 | (Netherlands) | Donyell Malen | 3 | 0 | 2 | 0 | 5 |
| 9 | DF | 3 | (Germany) | Waldemar Anton | 2 | 1 | 0 | 0 | 3 |
| 9 | DF | 5 | (Algeria) | Ramy Bensebaini | 1 | 0 | 2 | 0 | 3 |
| 11 | MF | 7 | (United States) | Giovanni Reyna | 2 | 0 | 0 | 0 | 2 |
| 11 | DF | 24 | (Sweden) | Daniel Svensson | 1 | 0 | 0 | 1 | 2 |
| 11 | DF | 26 | (Norway) | Julian Ryerson | 2 | 0 | 0 | 0 | 2 |
| 14 | MF | 13 | (Germany) | Pascal Groß | 0 | 0 | 1 | 0 | 1 |
| 14 | FW | 16 | (Belgium) | Julien Duranville | 0 | 1 | 0 | 0 | 1 |
| 14 | MF | 17 | (England) | Carney Chukwuemeka | 1 | 0 | 0 | 0 | 1 |
| 14 | MF | 20 | (Austria) | Marcel Sabitzer | 1 | 0 | 0 | 0 | 1 |
| 14 | MF | 77 | (England) | Jobe Bellingham | 0 | 0 | 0 | 1 | 1 |
| Own goals | | | | | 2 | 0 | 0 | 1 | 3 |
| Totals | | | | | 71 | 4 | 31 | 9 | 115 |

=== Assists ===
| Rank | Pos. | No. | Nat. | Player | Bundesliga | DFB-Pokal | Champions League | Club World Cup | Total |
|---|---|---|---|---|---|---|---|---|---|
| 1 | MF | 10 | (Germany) | Julian Brandt | 10 | 0 | 5 | 1 | 16 |
| 2 | MF | 13 | (Germany) | Pascal Groß | 10 | 2 | 2 | 0 | 14 |
| 3 | FW | 27 | (Germany) | Karim Adeyemi | 6 | 0 | 1 | 2 | 9 |
| 4 | DF | 5 | (Algeria) | Ramy Bensebaini | 6 | 0 | 1 | 0 | 7 |
| 5 | FW | 9 | (Guinea) | Serhou Guirassy | 2 | 0 | 4 | 0 | 6 |
| 6 | DF | 4 | (Germany) | Nico Schlotterbeck | 4 | 0 | 1 | 0 | 5 |
| 6 | FW | 14 | (Germany) | Maximilian Beier | 5 | 0 | 0 | 0 | 5 |
| 8 | DF | 24 | (Sweden) | Daniel Svensson | 3 | 0 | 0 | 0 | 3 |
| 8 | DF | 26 | (Norway) | Julian Ryerson | 3 | 0 | 0 | 0 | 3 |
| 8 | FW | 43 | (England) | Jamie Gittens | 3 | 0 | 0 | 0 | 3 |
| 11 | DF | 3 | (Germany) | Waldemar Anton | 2 | 0 | 0 | 0 | 2 |
| 11 | MF | 8 | (Germany) | Felix Nmecha | 1 | 0 | 1 | 0 | 2 |
| 13 | DF | 2 | (Brazil) | Yan Couto | 0 | 1 | 0 | 0 | 1 |
| 13 | MF | 7 | (United States) | Giovanni Reyna | 0 | 0 | 1 | 0 | 1 |
| 13 | FW | 21 | (Netherlands) | Donyell Malen | 0 | 0 | 1 | 0 | 1 |
| 13 | MF | 23 | (Germany) | Emre Can | 0 | 0 | 1 | 0 | 1 |
| 13 | MF | 77 | (England) | Jobe Bellingham | 0 | 0 | 0 | 1 | 1 |
| Totals | | | | | 55 | 3 | 18 | 4 | 80 |
