= Nmecha =

Nmecha is a surname. Notable people with the surname include:

- Felix Nmecha (born 2000), German footballer, brother of Lukas
- Lukas Nmecha (born 1998), German footballer, brother of Felix
