= Filippo Mane =

Italian footballer (born 2005)

Personal information
- Full name: Filippo Calixte Mane
- Date of birth: 8 March 2005 (age 21)
- Place of birth: Magenta, Italy
- Height: 1.88 m (6 ft 2 in)
- Position: Centre-back

Team information
- Current team: Borussia Dortmund
- Number: 39

Youth career
- 2009–2013: Vela Mesero
- 2013–2019: Novara
- 2019–2022: Sampdoria
- 2022–: Borussia Dortmund

Senior career*
Years	Team	Apps	(Gls)
2024–2026	Borussia Dortmund II	15	(3)
2024–	Borussia Dortmund	6	(0)

International career^{‡}
2021–2022	Italy U17	15	(0)
2023–2024	Italy U19	15	(0)
2024	Italy U20	3	(0)
2025–	Italy U21	6	(0)
2026–	Italy	2	(0)
- * Club domestic league appearances and goals as of 17:28, 5 September 2026 (UTC) ‡ National team caps and goals as of 16 November 2026

Filippo Calixte Mane (Italian pronunciation: [ˈfilippo ˈmane]; born 8 March 2005) is an Italian professional footballer who plays as a centre-back or right-back for Bundesliga club Borussia Dortmund and the Italy national team.

== Early life ==
Mane started playing football at the age of four.

== Club career ==
As a youth player, Mane joined the youth academy of Bundesliga side Borussia Dortmund, where he captained the team.

On 6 January 2025, he signed a three-and-a-half-year professional contract with Borussia. However, recurring injuries sidelined him for most of the 2024–25 season. Mane eventually made his senior debut on 18 August in a 1–0 away victory over Rot-Weiss Essen in the DFB-Pokal. Five days later, on 23 August, he featured in his first Bundesliga match, where he conceded a penalty and was sent off with a straight red card following a VAR review in a 3–3 away draw against St. Pauli in the league opener.

== International career ==
Mane is an Italian youth international. In May 2026, he was one of the players who were called up with the Italy national senior squad by interim head coach Silvio Baldini, for the friendly matches against Luxembourg and Greece on 3 and 7 June 2026, respectively.

== Style of play ==
Mane mainly operates as a centre-back and right-back, he has been described as "impresses with his strong anticipation in duels and in intercepting balls and is technically adept despite his height of 1.88 meters. In addition, he proves to be extremely calm, strong and likes to build up the game with long balls to the top".

== Personal life ==
Mane is of Senegalese descent.

Mane has stated that his name is pronounced with emphasis on the first syllable, following Italian pronunciation, and does not include an accent; he is often mistakenly referred to as 'Mané' by journalists and media sources.

== Career statistics ==
=== Club ===
As of match played 5 September 2026

Appearances and goals by club, season and competition
Club	Season	League			DFB-Pokal		Europe		Other		Total	
Club	Season	Division	Apps	Goals	Apps	Goals	Apps	Goals	Apps	Goals	Apps	Goals
Borussia Dortmund II	2024–25	3. Liga	5	0	—		—		—		5	0
Borussia Dortmund II	2025–26	Regionalliga West	10	3	—		—		—		10	3
Borussia Dortmund II	Total		15	3	—		—		—		15	3
Borussia Dortmund	2024–25	Bundesliga	0	0	0	0	0	0	0	0	0	0
Borussia Dortmund	2025–26	Bundesliga	4	0	1	0	1 (Note: Appearances in UEFA Champions League)	0	—		6	0
Borussia Dortmund	2026–27	Bundesliga	2	0	1	0	0	0	—		3	0
Borussia Dortmund	Total		6	0	2	0	1	0	0	0	9	0
Career total			21	3	2	0	1	0	0	0	24	3

=== International ===
As of match played 7 June 2026

Appearances and goals by national team and year
National team	Year	Apps	Goals
Italy	2026	2	0
Total		2	0
