= Yan Couto =

Brazilian footballer (born 2002)

Personal information
- Full name: Yan Bueno Couto
- Date of birth: 3 June 2002 (age 24)
- Place of birth: Curitiba, Brazil
- Height: 1.68 m (5 ft 6 in)
- Positions: Right-back; right wing-back

Team information
- Current team: Como (on loan from Borussia Dortmund)
- Number: 27

Youth career
- 2012–2020: Coritiba

Senior career*
Years	Team	Apps	(Gls)
2020	Coritiba	4	(0)
2020–2025	Manchester City	0	(0)
2020–2021	→ Girona (loan)	22	(1)
2021–2022	→ Braga (loan)	28	(1)
2022–2024	→ Girona (loan)	59	(2)
2024–2025	→ Borussia Dortmund (loan)	21	(0)
2025–	Borussia Dortmund	19	(2)
2026–	→ Como (loan)	11	(0)

International career^{‡}
2018–2019	Brazil U17	25	(1)
2023–2024	Brazil	4	(0)
Medal record
Men's football
Representing Brazil
FIFA U-17 World Cup
Winner	2019	Team
- * Club domestic league appearances and goals as of 21 November 2026 (UTC) ‡ National team caps and goals as of 8 June 2024 (UTC)

Yan Bueno Couto (born 3 June 2002) is a Brazilian professional footballer who plays as a right-back or right wing-back for Serie A club Como, on loan from Bundesliga club Borussia Dortmund.

== Club career ==
=== Coritiba ===
Born in Curitiba, Paraná, Couto joined Coritiba's youth setup in 2012, aged ten. In 2019, while still in the youth categories, he was included in The Guardian's "Next Generation 2019" as one of the 60 best young talents of the world.

Promoted to the main squad for the 2020 season, Couto made his senior debut on 21 February, coming on as a first-half substitute for injured Patrick Vieira in a 2–0 Campeonato Paranaense home win against Cianorte.

=== Manchester City ===
On 1 March 2020, despite being heavily linked with La Liga club Barcelona, Couto agreed to a five-year contract with Premier League side Manchester City, effective from 1 July. On 25 September, he joined Spanish club Girona in the Segunda División on a season-long loan.

Couto was named as a substitute by Pep Guardiola in City's 1–0 defeat to Leicester City at Wembley Stadium in the 2021 FA Community Shield, his only first team involvement for the club to date.

Couto spent the 2021–22 season on loan at Portuguese side Braga.

On 25 July 2022, Couto returned to Girona on a one-year loan deal, with the club in La Liga. On 14 July 2023, he returned to the club for a third spell, signing on loan until the end of the 2023–24 season.

=== Borussia Dortmund ===
On 3 August 2024, Couto joined Bundesliga club Borussia Dortmund on loan for the 2024–25 season, with a buy option clause that could be automatically triggered given certain playing criteria. On 10 October, Couto's €30 million release clause was triggered by Borussia Dortmund. On 16 September 2025, he scored his first goal for the club, which was also his debut UEFA Champions League goal, in a 4–4 away draw against Juventus.

At Dortmund, Couto struggled for playing time, with Julian Ryerson being the first-choice right-back. On 6 August 2026, Couto joined Serie A club Como on a one-year loan.

== International career ==
Couto was an undisputed starter for the Brazil under-17 football team, playing 20 matches and scoring once before being included in the 23-man list for the 2019 FIFA U-17 World Cup.

Yan Couto was called up to the senior squad for the first time on 6 October 2023, replacing the injured Vanderson, for the 2026 FIFA World Cup qualification matches against Venezuela and Uruguay on 12 and 17 October, respectively.

In June 2024, Couto revealed that he had changed from his pink hairdo in Girona to his natural hair color upon a request in the national team.

== Career statistics ==
=== Club ===
As of match played 21 November 2026

Appearances and goals by club, season and competition
Club	Season	League			National cup (Note: Includes Copa del Rey, Taça de Portugal, DFB-Pokal)		League cup (Note: Includes Taça da Liga)		Continental		Other		Total	
Club	Season	Division	Apps	Goals	Apps	Goals	Apps	Goals	Apps	Goals	Apps	Goals	Apps	Goals
Coritiba	2020	Série A	0	0	0	0	—		—		4 (Note: Appearances in Campeonato Paranaense)	0	4	0
Girona (loan)	2020–21	Segunda División	22	1	3	0	—		—		4 (Note: Appearances in Segunda División play-offs)	1	29	2
Braga (loan)	2021–22	Primeira Liga	28	1	3	0	2	0	9 (Note: Appearances in UEFA Europa League)	0	—		42	1
Girona (loan)	2022–23	La Liga	25	1	1	0	—		—		—		26	1
Girona (loan)	2023–24	La Liga	34	1	5	1	—		—		—		39	2
Girona (loan)	Total		59	2	6	1	—		—		—		65	3
Borussia Dortmund (loan)	2024–25	Bundesliga	21	0	1	0	—		8 (Note: Appearances in UEFA Champions League)	0	5 (Note: Appearances in FIFA Club World Cup)	0	35	0
Borussia Dortmund	2025–26	Bundesliga	19	2	1	0	—		7	1	—		27	3
Borussia Dortmund	Dortmund total		40	2	2	0	—		15	1	5	0	62	3
Como (loan)	2026–27	Serie A	11	0	0	0	—		4	0	—		15	0
Career total			160	6	14	1	2	0	28	1	13	1	217	9

=== International ===
As of match played 8 June 2024

Appearances and goals by national team and year
National team	Year	Apps	Goals
Brazil	2023	2	0
Brazil	2024	2	0
Total		4	0

== Honours ==
Brazil U17

- FIFA U-17 World Cup: 2019

Individual

- La Liga U23 Player of the Month: December 2023
