= Silas Ostrzinski =

German footballer (born 2003)

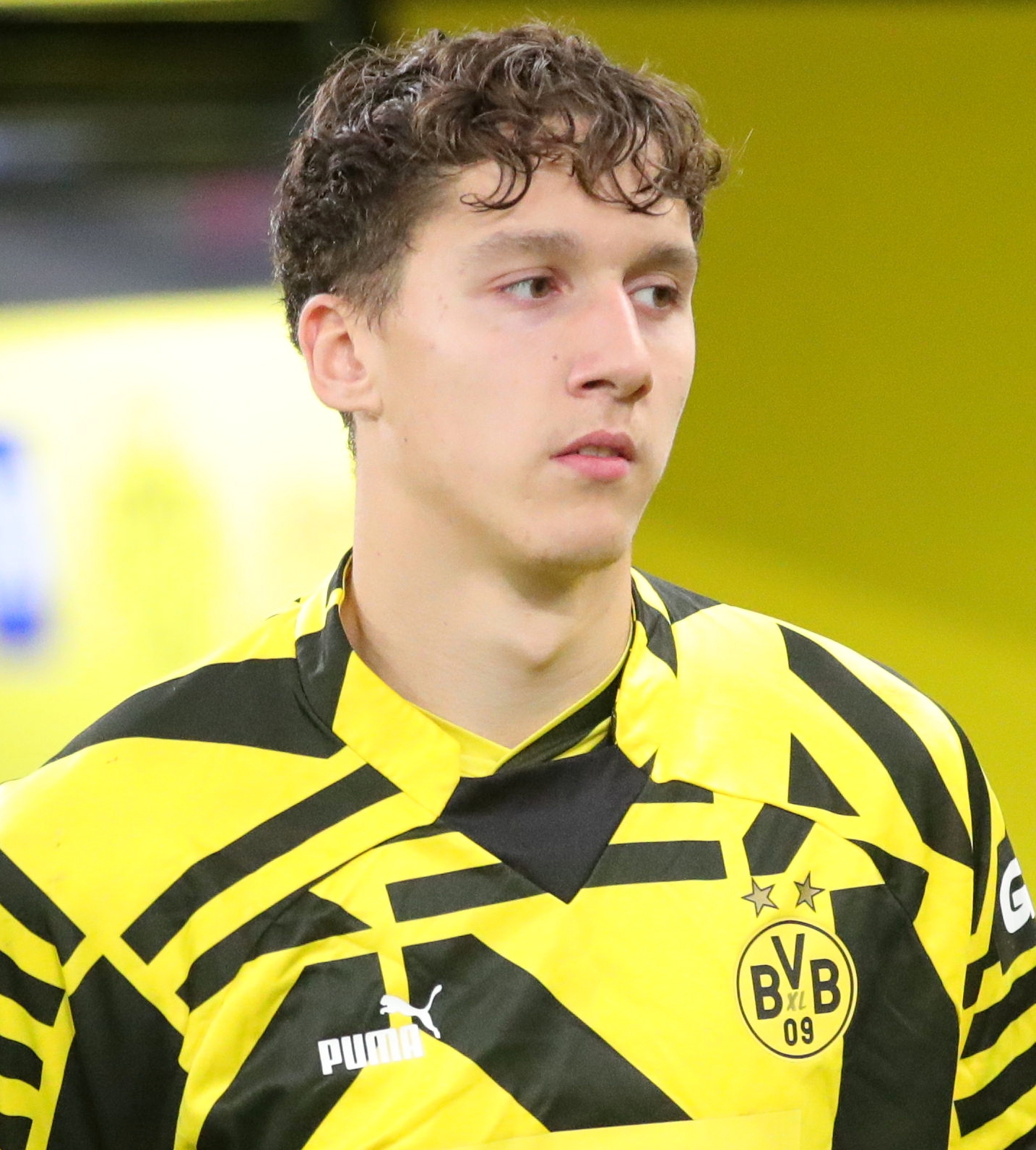
- Ostrzinski in 2022

Personal information
- Full name: Silas Ostrzinski
- Date of birth: 19 November 2003 (age 22)
- Place of birth: Hagen, Germany
- Height: 1.98 m (6 ft 6 in)
- Position: Goalkeeper

Team information
- Current team: Borussia Dortmund II
- Number: 31

Youth career
- SpVg Hagen 11
- 2018–2022: Borussia Dortmund

Senior career*
Years	Team	Apps	(Gls)
2022–	Borussia Dortmund II	60	(0)
2024–	Borussia Dortmund	0	(0)
- * Club domestic league appearances and goals as of 23 September 2026

Silas Ostrzinski (born 19 November 2003) is a German professional footballer who plays as a goalkeeper for Borussia Dortmund II.

== Club career ==
Ostrzinski joined the youth academy of Borussia Dortmund in 2018 from SpVg Hagen 11. On 14 April 2022, he extended his contract with Dortmund and was promoted to their reserves in the 3. Liga. On 13 June 2023, he again extended his contract with the club until 2025. He made the senior Borussa Dortmund squad for the 2025 FIFA Club World Cup.

== International career ==
Born in Germany, Ostrzinski is of Polish descent. In March 2024, he was on-call for the Germany U20s.

== Career statistics ==
As of match played 10 May 2026

Appearances and goals by club, season and competition
Club	Season	League			Cup		Europe		Other		Total	
Club	Season	Division	Apps	Goals	Apps	Goals	Apps	Goals	Apps	Goals	Apps	Goals
Borussia Dortmund II	2021–22	3. Liga	0	0	—		—		—		0	0
Borussia Dortmund II	2022–23	3. Liga	2	0	—		—		—		2	0
Borussia Dortmund II	2023–24	3. Liga	8	0	—		—		—		8	0
Borussia Dortmund II	2024–25	3. Liga	12	0	—		—		—		12	0
Borussia Dortmund II	2025–26	Regionalliga West	31	0	—		—		—		31	0
Borussia Dortmund II	Total		53	0	—		—		—		53	0
Borussia Dortmund	2024–25	Bundesliga	0	0	0	0	0	0	0	0	0	0
Borussia Dortmund	2025–26	Bundesliga	0	0	0	0	0	0	—		0	0
Borussia Dortmund	Total		0	0	0	0	0	0	0	0	0	0
Career total			53	0	0	0	0	0	0	0	53	0
