= Almugera Kabar =

German footballer

Personal information
- Full name: Almugera Raouf Mohammed Kabar
- Date of birth: 6 June 2006 (age 20)
- Place of birth: Bremen, Germany
- Height: 1.86 m (6 ft 1 in)
- Positions: Centre-back; left-back; left wing-back

Team information
- Current team: NEC (on loan from Borussia Dortmund)
- Number: 66

Youth career
- SV Hüsten 09
- 2016–2019: Hammer SpVg
- 2019–2024: Borussia Dortmund

Senior career*
Years	Team	Apps	(Gls)
2024–	Borussia Dortmund II	33	(7)
2024–	Borussia Dortmund	6	(0)
2026–	→ NEC (loan)	4	(0)

International career^{‡}
2021–2022	Germany U16	9	(3)
2022–2023	Germany U17	23	(3)
2024	Germany U18	2	(0)
2024–	Germany U19	14	(1)
2025–	Germany U20	7	(0)
Medal record
Men's football
Representing Germany
FIFA U-17 World Cup
Winner	2023 Indonesia
UEFA European Under-17 Championship
Winner	2023 Hungary
- * Club domestic league appearances and goals as of 22:05, 12 September 2026 (UTC) ‡ National team caps and goals as of 22:45, 16 November 2026 (UTC)

Almugera Raouf Mohammed Kabar (born 6 June 2006) is a German professional footballer who plays as a centre-back, left-back or left wing-back for Eredivisie club NEC, on loan from Bundesliga club Borussia Dortmund.

== Club career ==
=== Borussia Dortmund ===
Kabar is a youth product of the academies of SV Hüsten 09, and Hammer SpVg, before joining Borussia Dortmund in 2019. On 4 May 2023, he extended his contract with Borussia Dortmund until 2026. On 11 October 2023, he was named by English newspaper The Guardian as one of the best players born in 2006 worldwide. On 26 October 2024, he made his Bundesliga debut as a substitute in a 2–1 away defeat against FC Augsburg, where he was also sent off in stoppage time after receiving a second yellow card.

==== Loan to NEC ====
On 14 August 2026, Kabar joined Eredivisie club NEC, on loan for the 2026–27 season.

== International career ==
Born in Germany, Kabar is of Libyan descent. In May 2023, he was selected by Christian Wück for their winning campaign at the European Championship for the Germany under-17s. He worked their way up their youth categories, reaching the U19s in 2023. He notably had a strong performance in the semifinal, with a goal and assist against the Poland U17s.

== Career statistics ==
As of 15 October 2026

Appearances and goals by club, season and competition
Club	Season	League			DFB-Pokal		Europe		Other		Total	
Club	Season	Division	Apps	Goals	Apps	Goals	Apps	Goals	Apps	Goals	Apps	Goals
Borussia Dortmund II	2024–25	3. Liga	14	0	—		—		—		14	0
Borussia Dortmund II	2025–26	Regionalliga West	19	7	—		—		2 (Note: Appearances in Premier League International Cup)	1	21	8
Borussia Dortmund II	Total		33	7	—		—		2	1	35	8
Borussia Dortmund	2024–25	Bundesliga	5	0	0	0	0	0	0	0	5	0
Borussia Dortmund	2025–26	Bundesliga	1	0	0	0	0	0	—		1	0
Borussia Dortmund	Total		6	0	0	0	0	0	0	0	6	0
NEC (loan)	2026–27	Eredivisie	4	0	0	0	4 (Note: Two appearances in UEFA Champions League, two appearances in UEFA Europa League)	0	—		8	0
Career total			43	7	0	0	4	0	2	1	49	8

== Honours ==
Germany U17

- UEFA European Under-17 Championship: 2023
- FIFA U-17 World Cup: 2023
