= Ayman Azhil =

German footballer (born 2001)

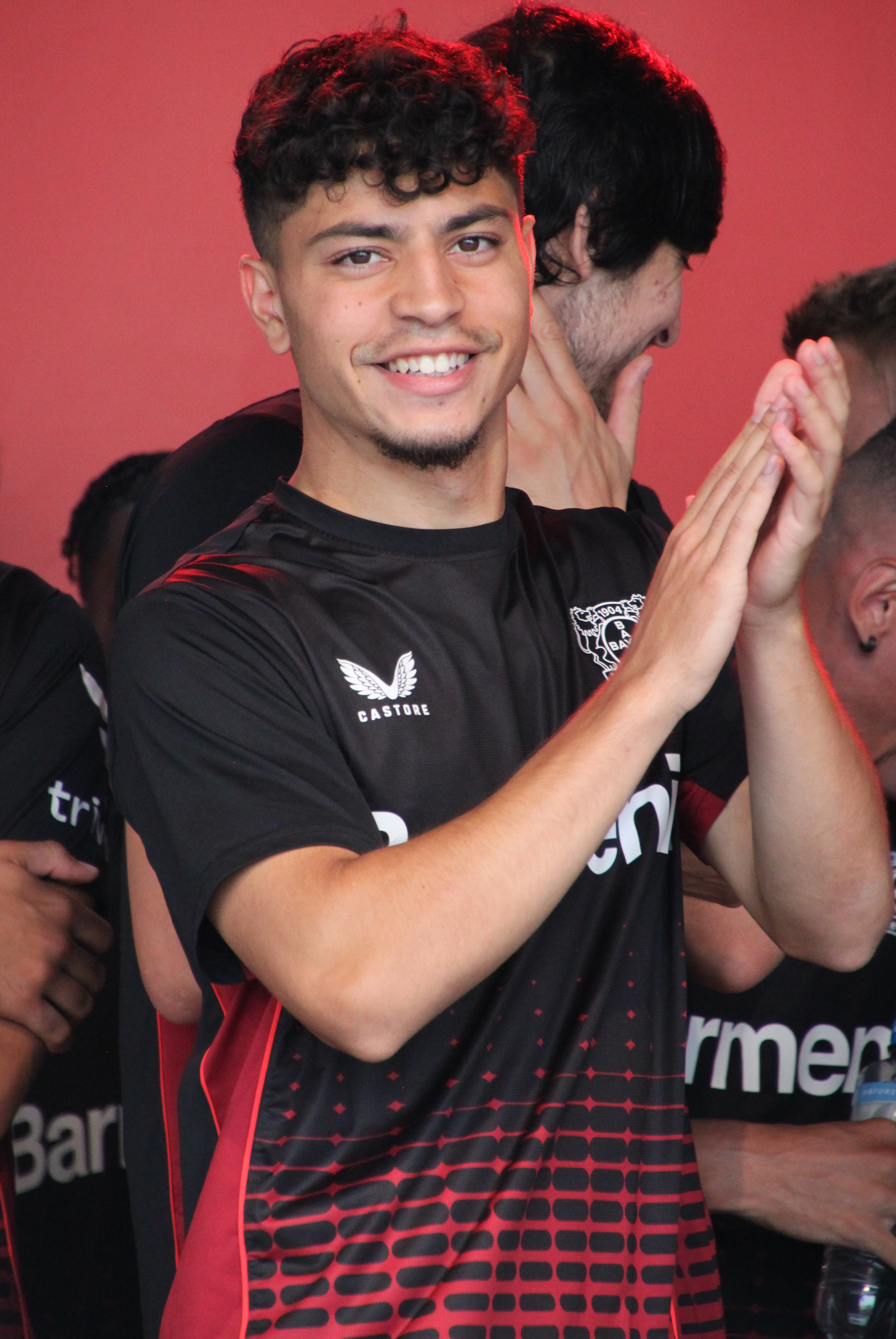
- Azhil with Bayer Leverkusen in 2022

Personal information
- Full name: Ayman Azhil
- Date of birth: 10 April 2001 (age 25)
- Place of birth: Düsseldorf, Germany
- Height: 1.70 m (5 ft 7 in)
- Position: Midfielder

Team information
- Current team: Borussia Dortmund II
- Number: 6

Youth career
- 2008–2020: Bayer Leverkusen

Senior career*
| Years | Team | Apps | (Gls) |
| 2020–2023 | Bayer Leverkusen | 1 | (0) |
| 2020–2022 | → RKC Waalwijk (loan) | 50 | (0) |
| 2023– | Borussia Dortmund II | 86 | (10) |
| 2024– | Borussia Dortmund | 1 | (0) |
- * Club domestic league appearances and goals as of 23 September 2026

Ayman Azhil (born 10 April 2001) is a German-Moroccan professional footballer who plays as a midfielder for Regionalliga West club Borussia Dortmund II.

== Club career ==
A youth product of Bayer Leverkusen, Azhil joined Waalwijk on loan on 31 August 2020. Azhil made his professional debut with Waalwijk in a 1–0 Eredivisie win over Heracles Almelo on 17 October 2020.

== International career ==
Born in Germany, Azhil is of Moroccan descent.

== Career statistics ==
=== Club ===
As of match played 5 November 2024

Appearances and goals by club, season and competition
| Club | Season | League | | | Cup | | Europe | | Other | | Total | |
| Club | Season | Division | Apps | Goals | Apps | Goals | Apps | Goals | Apps | Goals | Apps | Goals |
|---|---|---|---|---|---|---|---|---|---|---|---|---|
| Bayer Leverkusen | 2019–20 | Bundesliga | 0 | 0 | 0 | 0 | 0 | 0 | — | | 0 | 0 |
| Bayer Leverkusen | 2022–23 | Bundesliga | 1 | 0 | 0 | 0 | 0 | 0 | — | | 1 | 0 |
| Bayer Leverkusen | Total | | 1 | 0 | 0 | 0 | 0 | 0 | — | | 1 | 0 |
| RKC Waalwijk (loan) | 2020–21 | Eredivisie | 22 | 0 | 1 | 0 | — | | — | | 23 | 0 |
| RKC Waalwijk (loan) | 2021–22 | Eredivisie | 28 | 0 | 4 | 0 | — | | — | | 32 | 0 |
| RKC Waalwijk (loan) | Total | | 50 | 0 | 5 | 0 | — | | — | | 55 | 0 |
| Borussia Dortmund II | 2023–24 | 3. Liga | 28 | 5 | — | | — | | — | | 28 | 5 |
| Borussia Dortmund II | 2024–25 | 3. Liga | 10 | 2 | — | | — | | — | | 10 | 2 |
| Borussia Dortmund II | Total | | 38 | 7 | — | | — | | — | | 38 | 7 |
| Borussia Dortmund | 2024–25 | Bundesliga | 1 | 0 | 0 | 0 | 1 (Note: Appearance in UEFA Champions League) | 0 | 0 | 0 | 2 | 0 |
| Career total | | | 90 | 7 | 5 | 0 | 1 | 0 | 0 | 0 | 96 | 7 |
