= Julien Duranville =

Belgian footballer (born 2006)

Personal information
- Full name: Julien Dienda M. Duranville
- Date of birth: 5 May 2006 (age 20)
- Place of birth: Uccle, Belgium
- Height: 1.70 m (5 ft 7 in)
- Position: Forward

Team information
- Current team: Lyon
- Number: 24

Youth career
- 2013–2021: Anderlecht

Senior career*
Years	Team	Apps	(Gls)
2022–2023	Anderlecht	6	(1)
2022–2023	RSCA Futures	4	(1)
2023–2026	Borussia Dortmund	15	(0)
2025	Borussia Dortmund II	4	(0)
2026	→ Basel (loan)	16	(2)
2026–	Lyon	2	(0)

International career^{‡}
2021–2022	Belgium U16	12	(2)
2022	Belgium U19	2	(0)
2024–	Belgium U21	7	(2)
2024–	Belgium	2	(0)
- * Club domestic league appearances and goals as of 18 October 2026 ‡ National team caps and goals as of 15:27, 18 November 2026 (UTC)

Julien Dienda M. Duranville (born 5 May 2006) is a Belgian professional footballer who plays as a forward for Ligue 1 club Lyon and the Belgium national team.

== Early life and club career ==
Duranville was born in Uccle, Belgium, to a father from Martinique and a Congolese mother from Etterbeek.

Duranville is a youth product of Anderlecht, signing his first contract in May 2021. He made his professional debut on 22 May 2022 in a 1–1 Belgian First Division A draw against Club Brugge. On 27 January 2023, Duranville signed for Bundesliga club Borussia Dortmund. On the final matchday of the 2022–23 season, he made his debut in a 2–2 draw against Mainz.

On 11 October 2023, he was named by English newspaper The Guardian as one of the best players born in 2006 worldwide. However, he missed the majority of the 2023–24 season due to a thigh muscle injury.

On 17 August 2024, Duranville scored his first goal for Die Schwarzgelben in a 4–1 victory over 1. FC Phönix Lübeck. He made his European debut in the club's 7–1 thrashing of Scottish side Celtic.

On 5 July 2025, in a FIFA Club World Cup quarter-final match against Real Madrid, Duranville suffered a dislocated shoulder injury. On 22 January 2026, he joined Swiss champions Basel on loan until the end of the 2025–26 season.

On 2 July 2026, Duranville signed a five-year contract with Ligue 1 club Lyon.

== International career ==
Duranville debuted for the Belgium national team on 6 September 2024 in a Nations League game against Israel at the Nagyerdei Stadion in Hungary. He substituted Jérémy Doku in the 74th minute of Belgium's 3–1 victory.

== Career statistics ==
=== Club ===
As of match played 18 October 2026

Appearances and goals by club, season and competition
Club	Season	League			National cup (Note: Includes Belgian Cup, DFB-Pokal, Swiss Cup, Coupe de France)		Europe		Other		Total	
Club	Season	Division	Apps	Goals	Apps	Goals	Apps	Goals	Apps	Goals	Apps	Goals
Anderlecht	2021–22	Belgian Pro League	0	0	0	0	—		1 (Note: Appearance in Belgian Pro League play-offs)	0	1	0
Anderlecht	2022–23	Belgian Pro League	6	1	0	0	4 (Note: Appearances in UEFA Europa Conference League)	0	—		10	1
Anderlecht	Total		6	1	0	0	4	0	1	0	11	1
RSCA Futures	2022–23	Challenger Pro League	4	1	—		—		—		4	1
Borussia Dortmund	2022–23	Bundesliga	1	0	0	0	0	0	—		1	0
Borussia Dortmund	2023–24	Bundesliga	2	0	0	0	0	0	—		2	0
Borussia Dortmund	2024–25	Bundesliga	12	0	1	1	9 (Note: Appearances in UEFA Champions League)	0	2 (Note: Appearances in FIFA Club World Cup)	0	24	1
Borussia Dortmund	Total		15	0	1	1	9	0	2	0	27	1
Borussia Dortmund II	2024–25	3. Liga	2	0	—		—		—		2	0
Borussia Dortmund II	2025–26	Regionalliga West	2	0	—		—		—		2	0
Borussia Dortmund II	Total		4	0	—		—		—		4	0
Basel (loan)	2025–26	Swiss Super League	16	2	1	0	0	0	—		17	2
Lyon	2026–27	Ligue 1	2	0	0	0	1	0	—		3	0
Career total			47	4	2	1	14	0	3	0	66	5

=== International ===
As of match played 9 September 2024

Appearances and goals by national team and year
National team	Year	Apps	Goals
Belgium	2024	2	0
Total		2	0
