= Felix Nmecha =

German footballer (born 2000)

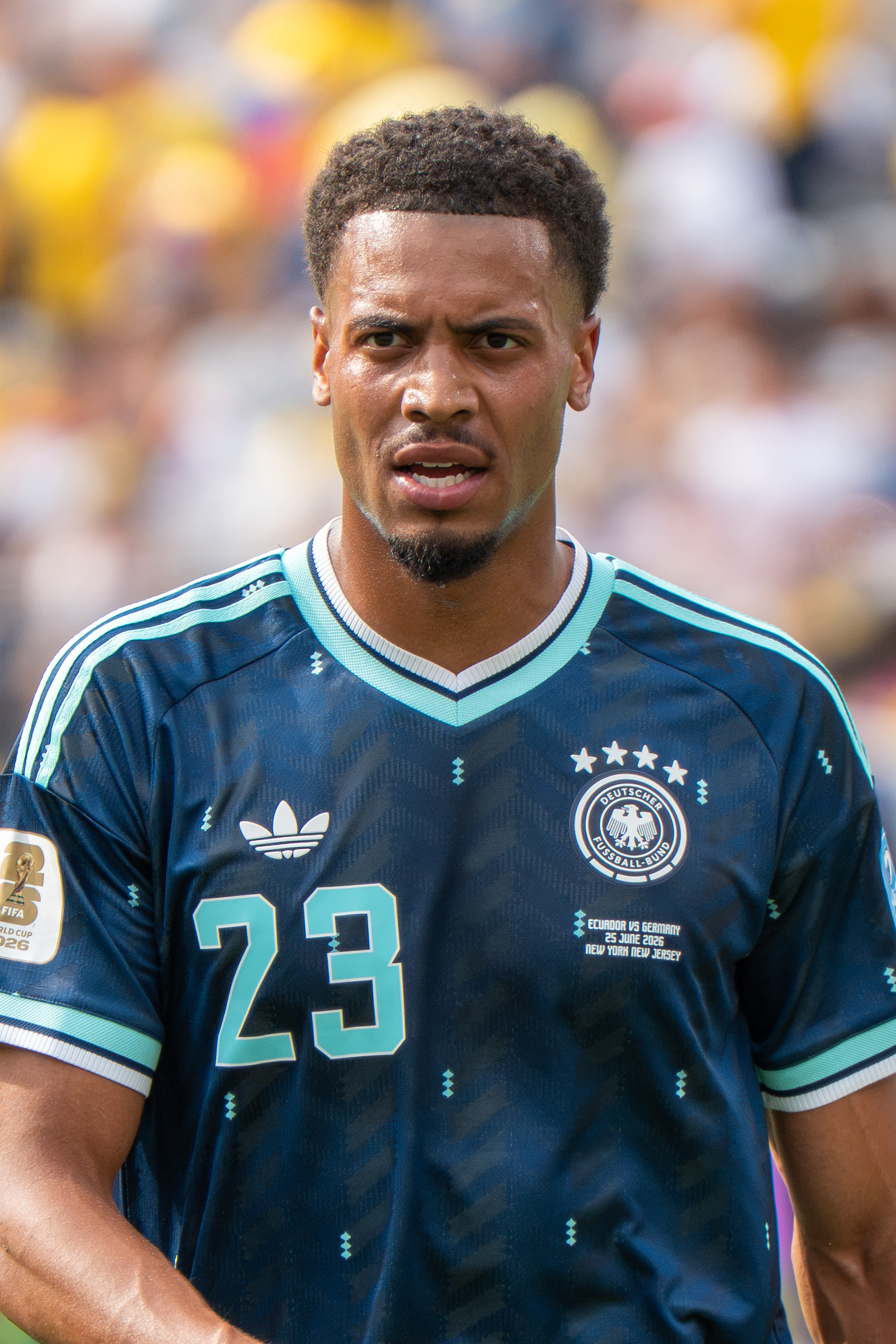
- Nmecha with Germany in 2026

Personal information
- Full name: Felix Kalu Nmecha
- Date of birth: 10 October 2000 (age 26)
- Place of birth: Hamburg, Germany
- Height: 1.90 m (6 ft 3 in)
- Position: Midfielder

Team information
- Current team: Borussia Dortmund
- Number: 8

Youth career
- 2007–2019: Manchester City

Senior career*
Years	Team	Apps	(Gls)
2019–2021	Manchester City	0	(0)
2021–2023	VfL Wolfsburg	46	(3)
2023–	Borussia Dortmund	84	(11)

International career^{‡}
2015	England U16	2	(0)
2018	Germany U18	3	(0)
2018	England U18	10	(2)
2018–2019	England U19	4	(1)
2022	Germany U21	3	(1)
2023–	Germany	15	(3)
- * Club domestic league appearances and goals as of 7 November 2026 ‡ National team caps and goals as of 21:50, 13 November 2026 (UTC)

Felix Kalu Nmecha (born 10 October 2000) is a German professional footballer who plays as a midfielder for Bundesliga club Borussia Dortmund and the Germany national team.

== Club career ==
=== Manchester City ===
Nmecha made his Manchester City debut in the second leg of the EFL Cup semi-final against Burton Albion, replacing Oleksandr Zinchenko in the 67th minute, in which Manchester City won the game 1–0. He scored the winning goal in the U18 Premier League Cup final on 19 March 2019, against Middlesbrough U18. On 3 November 2020, Nmecha provided an assist for João Cancelo on his Champions League debut for City as a substitute for Kevin De Bruyne in a 3–0 home win over Olympiacos in the group stage. He was released by City at the end of his contract on 30 June 2021.

=== Wolfsburg ===
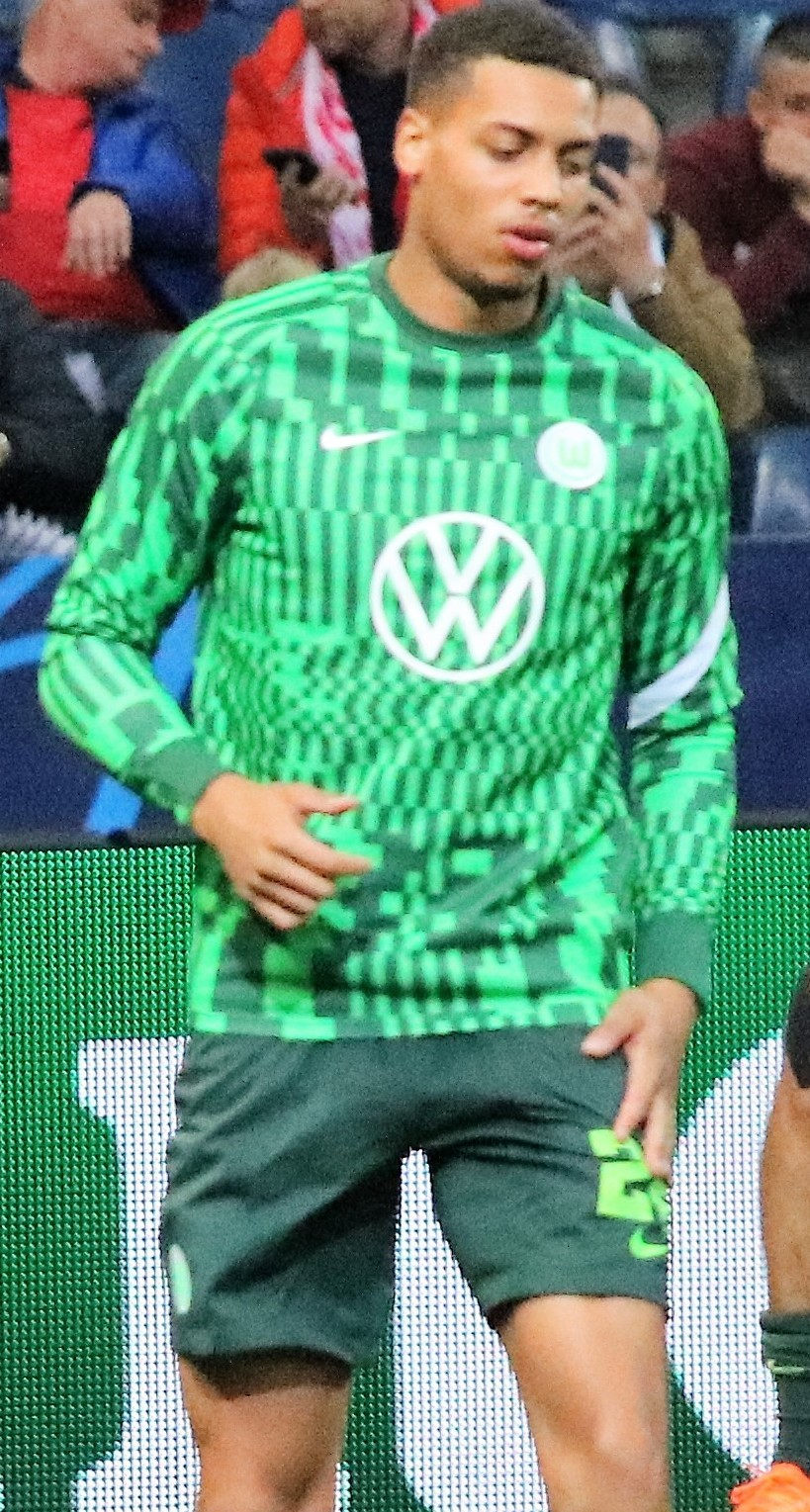
Nmecha training with Wolfsburg in 2021

Nmecha joined VfL Wolfsburg after leaving Manchester City, shortly after his brother Lukas made the same move. In his two seasons at the club, he played 50 competitive matches, including two Champions League games during the 2021–22 season, and scored three goals during his second season in Bundesliga, in which he netted a brace against Bochum in a 4–0 win.

=== Borussia Dortmund ===
On 3 July 2023, Nmecha signed for Borussia Dortmund on a five-year contract. His transfer was controversial for Dortmund's supporters due to comments and social media posts made in the past by Nmecha which were regarded as homophobic and transphobic. This included one instance in which Nmecha associated the term "pride" with the devil. On 25 October 2023, he scored his first goal for Dortmund in a 1–0 away victory against Newcastle United at St James' Park in the Champions League, which was also his first goal in the competition.

== International career ==
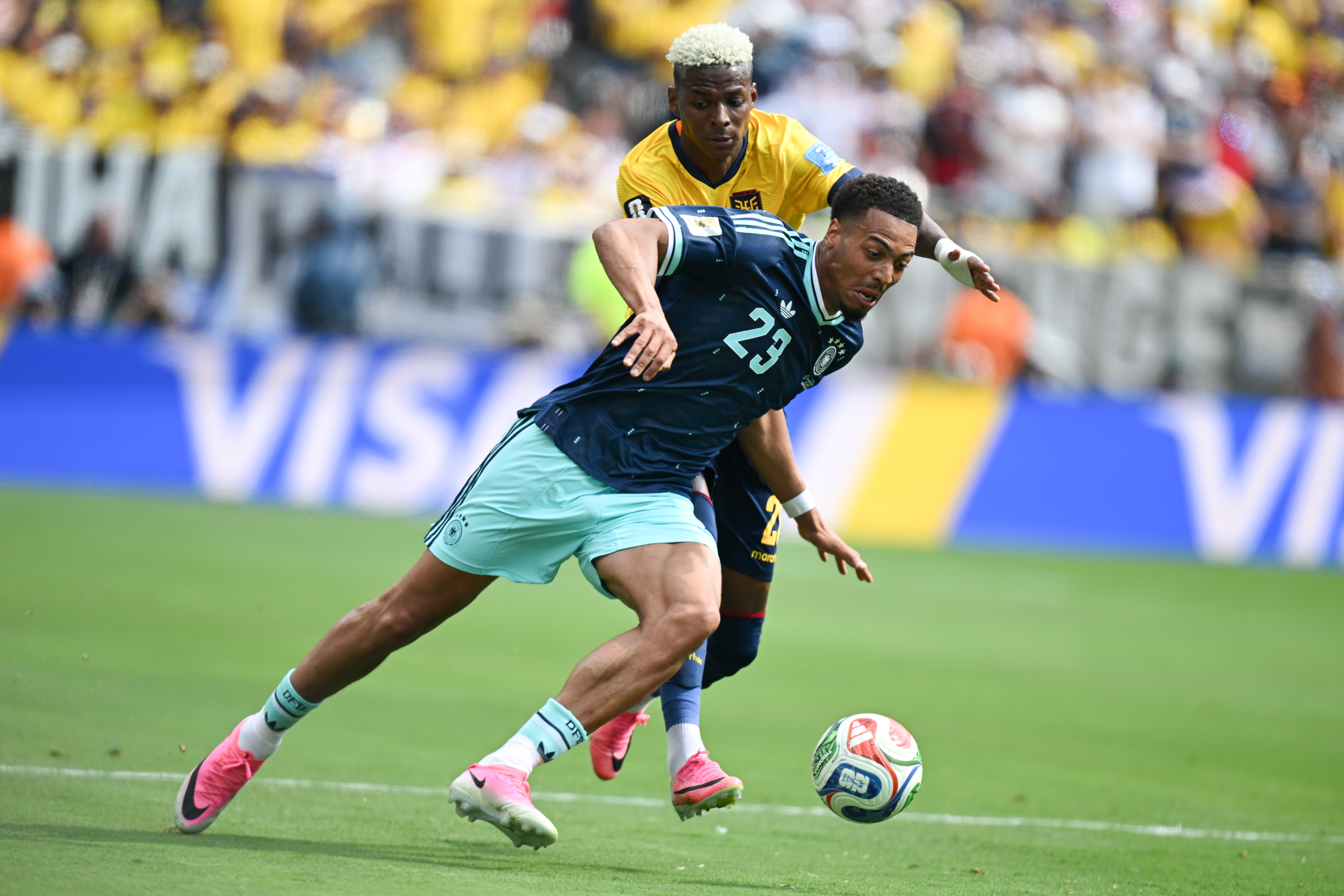
Nmecha playing with Germany at the 2026 FIFA World Cup

Nmecha represented both Germany and England at youth international level.

On 17 March 2023, he received his first call-up to the German senior national team for the friendlies against Peru and Belgium. He scored his first international goal in a 1–1 away draw against Hungary in November 2024, in the UEFA Nation's League.

On 21 May 2026, he was selected in Germany's 26-man squad for the 2026 FIFA World Cup. On 14 June 2026, Nmecha scored Germany's first goal of the World Cup to take 1–0 lead over Curaçao in an eventual 7–1 win.

== Personal life ==
The son of a Nigerian father and German mother, Nmecha and his elder brother Lukas (who also plays professionally for Leeds United) were born in Hamburg, but moved to England with their family in 2007. After honing their skills in the Hamburg borough of Altona, the switch to Manchester brought the young Nmechas to the attention of Premier League team Manchester City. Both went on to join the club's academy.

Nmecha is a Christian. He has said, "Every time I go on the field, it's not about me, it's about glorifying God." He supports Ballers in God, an evangelical Christian organisation behind the "The King's Return" campaign, which he promoted on social media during the 2026 World Cup.

== Career statistics ==
=== Club ===
As of match played 7 November 2026

Appearances and goals by club, season and competition
Club	Season	League			National cup (Note: Includes FA Cup, DFB-Pokal)		League cup (Note: Includes EFL Cup)		Europe		Other		Total	
Club	Season	Division	Apps	Goals	Apps	Goals	Apps	Goals	Apps	Goals	Apps	Goals	Apps	Goals
Manchester City U21	2018–19	—			—		—		—		4 (Note: Appearance(s) in EFL Trophy)	0	4	0
Manchester City U21	2019–20	—			—		—		—		1	0	1	0
Manchester City U21	2020–21	—			—		—		—		1	0	1	0
Manchester City U21	Total		—		—		—		—		6	0	6	0
Manchester City	2018–19	Premier League	0	0	0	0	1	0	0	0	0	0	1	0
Manchester City	2019–20	Premier League	0	0	0	0	0	0	0	0	0	0	0	0
Manchester City	2020–21	Premier League	0	0	1	0	0	0	1 (Note: Appearance(s) in UEFA Champions League)	0	—		2	0
Manchester City	Total		0	0	1	0	1	0	1	0	0	0	3	0
VfL Wolfsburg	2021–22	Bundesliga	16	0	0	0	—		2	0	—		18	0
VfL Wolfsburg	2022–23	Bundesliga	30	3	2	0	—		—		—		32	3
VfL Wolfsburg	Total		46	3	2	0	—		2	0	—		50	3
Borussia Dortmund	2023–24	Bundesliga	20	1	1	0	—		8	1	—		29	2
Borussia Dortmund	2024–25	Bundesliga	26	4	1	0	—		9	1	5 (Note: Appearances in FIFA Club World Cup)	1	41	6
Borussia Dortmund	2025–26	Bundesliga	29	2	3	0	—		10	3	—		42	5
Borussia Dortmund	2026–27	Bundesliga	9	4	2	0	—		4	0	1 (Note: Appearance in Franz Beckenbauer Supercup)	0	16	4
Borussia Dortmund	Total		84	11	7	0	—		31	5	6	1	128	17
Career total			130	14	9	0	1	0	34	5	12	1	186	20

=== International ===
As of match played 13 November 2026

Appearances and goals by national team and year
National team	Year	Apps	Goals
Germany	2023	1	0
Germany	2024	2	1
Germany	2025	3	0
Germany	2026	9	2
Total		15	3

Scores and results list Germany's goal tally first, score column indicates score after each Nmecha goal.

List of international goals scored by Felix Nmecha
No.	Date	Venue	Opponent	Score	Result	Competition
1	19 November 2024	Puskás Aréna, Budapest, Hungary	Hungary	1–0	1–1	2024–25 UEFA Nations League A
2	14 June 2026	NRG Stadium, Houston, United States	Curaçao	1–0	7–1	2026 FIFA World Cup
3	24 September 2026	Johan Cruyff Arena, Amsterdam, Netherlands	Netherlands	1–0	1–1	2026–27 UEFA Nations League A

== Honours ==
Borussia Dortmund

- UEFA Champions League runner-up: 2023–24

Individual

- Bundesliga Goal of the Month: September 2026
