= Elias Benkara =

Footballer (born 2007)

Elias Benkara إلياس بن قارة
Personal information
- Date of birth: 29 April 2007 (age 19)
- Place of birth: Frankfurt, Germany
- Height: 1.93 m (6 ft 4 in)
- Position: Defender

Team information
- Current team: Greuther Fürth (on loan from Borussia Dortmund)
- Number: 4

Youth career
- –2021: Mainz 05
- 2021–2025: Borussia Dortmund

Senior career*
Years	Team	Apps	(Gls)
2024–	Borussia Dortmund	0	(0)
2025–	Borussia Dortmund II	15	(1)
2026–	→ Greuther Fürth (loan)	0	(0)
2026–	→ Greuther Fürth II (loan)	5	(0)

International career
2022	Germany U15	1	(0)
2023	Germany U17	2	(0)
- * Club domestic league appearances and goals as of 23:45, 7 November 2026 (UTC)

Elias Benkara (Arabic: إلياس بن قارة; born 29 April 2007) is a professional footballer who plays as a defender for 2. Bundesliga club Greuther Fürth, on loan from Borussia Dortmund. Born in Germany, he chose to represent Algeria at senior level internationally.

== Early life ==
Benkara was born on 29 April 2007 in Frankfurt, Germany, to an Algerian father and a German mother.

== Club career ==
=== Borussia Dortmund ===
As a youth player, Benkara joined the youth academy of German side Mainz. Following his stint there, he joined the youth academy of German side Borussia Dortmund ahead of the 2021–22 season at the age of fourteen Benkara was later promoted to the club's senior team during the winter of 2024, and subsequently to the club's reserve team, with whom he made his professional debut.

==== Loan to Greuther Fürth ====
On 28 August 2026, Benkara signed with 2. Bundesliga club Greuther Fürth on loan for the 2026–27 season, with a purchase obligation.

== International career ==
Benkara is a Germany youth international. On 18 November 2023, he debuted with Germany U17 during a 1–1 away friendly draw against Turkey U17.

He was nominated for the Algeria national team by head coach Vladimir Petković on late 2025. Benkara was called-up for the 3–1 win friendly match against Zimbabwe on 13 November 2025, as an unused substitute however.

== Style of play ==
Benkara plays as a defender. German news website Bundesliga wrote in 2025 that he "is strong in the air, a commanding presence at the heart of the defence and a composed distributor of possession. His height and athleticism also make him a real threat in the opposition penalty area".
