= Guille Bueno =

Spanish footballer (born 2002)

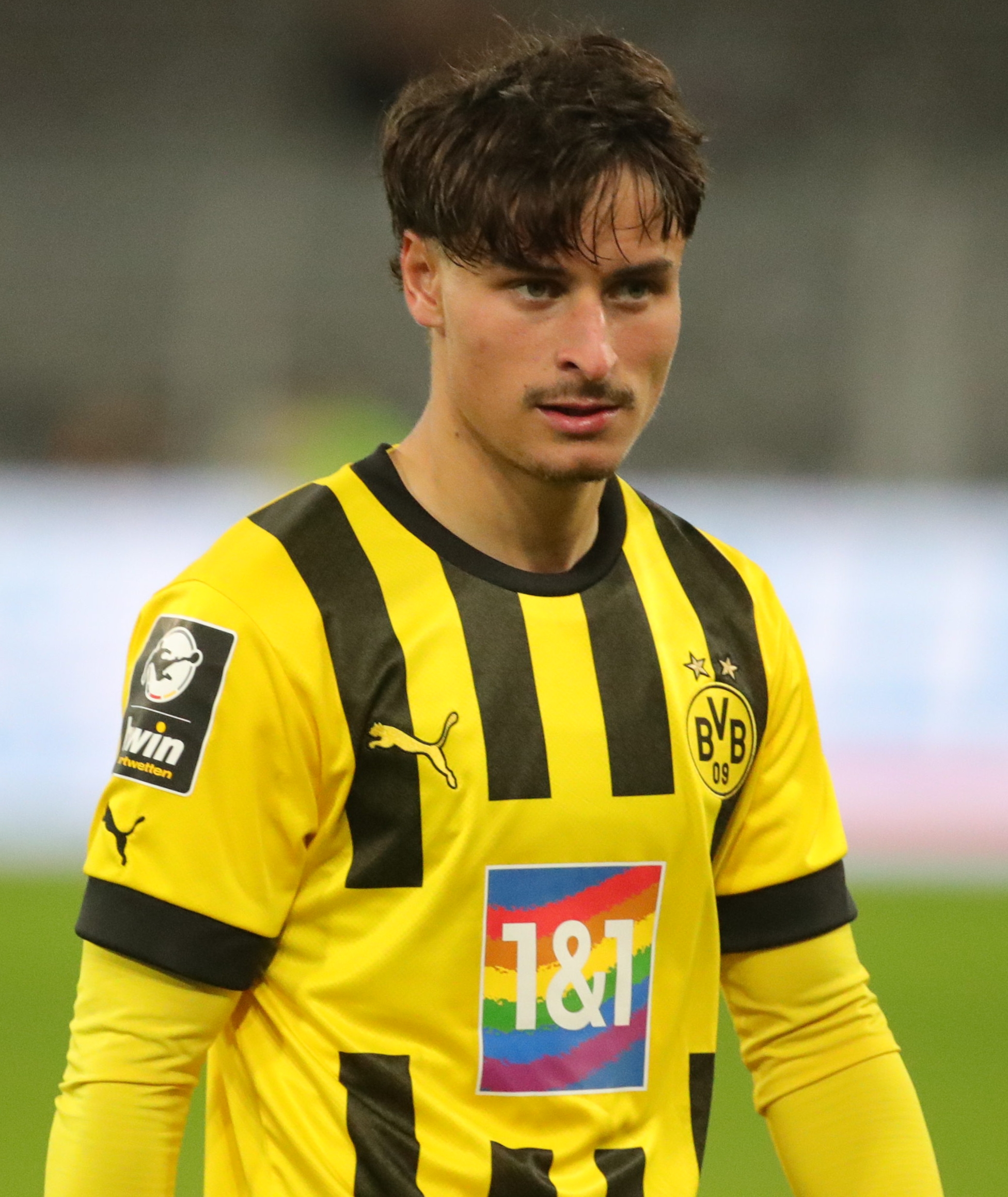
- Bueno playing for Borussia Dortmund II in 2022

Personal information
- Full name: Guillermo Bueno López
- Date of birth: 18 September 2002 (age 24)
- Place of birth: Vigo, Spain
- Height: 1.78 m (5 ft 10 in)
- Position: Left-back

Team information
- Current team: Valladolid
- Number: 3

Youth career
- –2020: CD Areosa
- 2020–2021: Deportivo La Coruña

Senior career*
| Years | Team | Apps | (Gls) |
| 2021–2025 | Borussia Dortmund II | 64 | (1) |
| 2023–2025 | Borussia Dortmund | 0 | (0) |
| 2024–2025 | → Darmstadt 98 (loan) | 22 | (0) |
| 2025– | Valladolid | 19 | (0) |
- * Club domestic league appearances and goals as of 9 June 2026

Guillermo "Guille" Bueno López (born 18 September 2002) is a Spanish professional footballer who plays as a left-back for Segunda División club Valladolid.

== Career ==
Born in Vigo, Galicia, Bueno played for CD Areosa's academy before joining Deportivo La Coruña's academy in 2020. After a season with Deportivo La Coruña, he signed for German Bundesliga side Borussia Dortmund in summer 2021 on a three-year contract, initially joining their reserve team. Bueno reportedly turned down an offer of a contract extension from Deportivo but was still under contract until 2022; Deportivo alleged that Bueno's transfer to Dortmund was improper and threatened a lawsuit. He made his debut for the Dortmund's reserve team on 24 October 2021 as a substitute in a 1–0 3. Liga defeat to Viktoria Köln.

Bueno was called up to Borussia's senior squad in the 2023–24 season, but remained on the bench in those games. On 22 August 2024, he moved on loan to SV Darmstadt 98 in 2. Bundesliga.

On 20 July 2025, Bueno returned to his home country after signing a three-year contract with Segunda División side Valladolid.

== Personal life ==
He has an identical twin brother named Hugo Bueno, who currently plays for Wolverhampton Wanderers
