= 1965 DFB-Pokal final =

- Match programme cover
- Event: 1964–65 DFB-Pokal
Borussia Dortmund	Alemannia Aachen
2	0
- Date: 22 May 1965
- Venue: Niedersachsenstadion, Hanover
- Referee: Rudibert Jacobi (Heidelberg)
- Attendance: 55,000

The 1965 DFB-Pokal final decided the winner of the 1964–65 DFB-Pokal, the 22nd season of Germany's knockout football cup competition. It was played on 22 May 1965 at the Niedersachsenstadion in Hanover. Borussia Dortmund won the match 2–0 against Alemannia Aachen, to claim their 1st cup title.

== Route to the final ==
The DFB-Pokal began with 32 teams in a single-elimination knockout cup competition. There were a total of four rounds leading up to the final. Teams were drawn against each other, and the winner after 90 minutes would advance. If still tied, 30 minutes of extra time was played. If the score was still level, a replay would take place at the original away team's stadium. If still level after 90 minutes, 30 minutes of extra time was played. If the score was still level, a drawing of lots would decide who would advance to the next round.

Note: In all results below, the score of the finalist is given first (H: home; A: away).

Borussia Dortmund		Round	Alemannia Aachen
Opponent	Result	1964–65 DFB-Pokal	Opponent	Result
Preußen Münster (A)	1–0	Round 1	VfL Osnabrück (A)	3–1
Tennis Borussia Berlin (A)	2–1	Round of 16	Rot-Weiß Oberhausen (A)	1–0
Eintracht Braunschweig (A)	2–0	Quarter-finals	Hannover 96 (H)	2–1
1. FC Nürnberg (H)	4–2	Semi-finals	Schalke 04 (H)	4–3 (a.e.t.)

== Match ==
=== Details ===
22 May 1965
16:00 CET

Borussia Dortmund	2–0	Alemannia Aachen
Schmidt 10'; Emmerich 18'	Report

Niedersachsenstadion, Hanover
Attendance: 55,000
Referee: Rudibert Jacobi (Heidelberg)

Borussia Dortmund	Alemannia Aachen

GK	1	(West Germany) Hans Tilkowski
RB		(West Germany) Gerhard Cyliax
LB		(West Germany) Theodor Redder
RH		(West Germany) Dieter Kurrat
CH		(West Germany) Wolfgang Paul
LH		(West Germany) Hermann Straschitz
OR		(West Germany) Reinhold Wosab
IR		(West Germany) Wilhelm Sturm
CF		(West Germany) Alfred Schmidt (c)
IL		(West Germany) Friedhelm Konietzka
OL		(West Germany) Lothar Emmerich
Manager:
(West Germany) Hermann Eppenhoff

GK	1	(West Germany) Gerhard Prokop
RB		(West Germany) Herbert Krisp
LB		(West Germany) Werner Nievelstein
RH		(West Germany) Erwin Hermandung
CH		(West Germany) Josef Thelen
LH		(West Germany) Christian Breuer
OR		(West Germany) Herbert Gronen
IR		(West Germany) Franz-Josef Nacken
CF		(West Germany) Josef Martinelli (c)
IL		(West Germany) Alfred Glenski
OL		(West Germany) Wilhelm Krieger
Manager:
(West Germany) Oswald Pfau

Match rules

- 90 minutes.
- 30 minutes of extra time if necessary.
- Replay if scores still level.
- No substitutions.
