= 1963–64 Borussia Dortmund season =

1st season of Borussia Dortmund in the Bundesliga

Borussia Dortmund
1963–64 season
- Manager: Hermann Eppenhoff; Heinrich Kwiatkowski
- Stadium: Stadion Rote Erde
- Bundesliga: 4th
- European Cup: Semi–finals
- DFB-Pokal: First round
- Top goalscorer: League: Friedhelm Konietzka (20); All: Friedhelm Konietzka (24)
- Highest home attendance: 42,356 (vs Internazionale, 15 April 1964)
- Lowest home attendance: 8,000 (vs Hamburger SV, 5 May 1964)
- Average home league attendance: 23,667
- Biggest win: 9–3 (vs 1. FC Kaiserslautern, 16 November 1963); 7–1 (vs VfB Stuttgart, 14 March 1964)
- Biggest defeat: 1–6 (vs TSV 1860 München, 18 January 1964)

The 1963–64 Borussia Dortmund season was the first season in the Bundesliga for Borussia Dortmund. After winning the 1963 German football championship, they could not defend their title and ended up 4th in the inaugural Bundesliga season. In the European Cup they closely missed the final after losing the semi-final against Internazionale.

== Transfers ==
=== In ===
No.	Pos.	Nation	Player
—	FW	FRG	Franz Brungs (from Borussia Mönchengladbach)
—	FW	FRG	Hans-Jürgen Kurrat (?)
—	DF	FRG	Manfred Pfeiffer (?)
—	FW	FRG	Burghard Rylewicz (from VfB Oldenburg)
—	GK	FRG	Hans Tilkowski (from SC Westfalia Herne)

=== Out ===
No.	Pos.	Nation	Player
—	MF	FRG	Alfred Kelbassa (?)
—	FW	FRG	Wolfgang Peters (?)
—	FW	FRG	Gerd Roggensack (to Arminia Bielefeld)
—	MF	FRG	Jürgen Schütz (to A.S. Roma)

== Results ==
=== Bundesliga ===
Win Draw Loss

Note: Results are given with Borussia Dortmund score listed first.

Game	Date	Venue	Opponent	Result F–A	Attendance	Borussia Dortmund Goalscorers
1	24 August 1963	A	SV Werder Bremen	2–3	30,000	Konietzka 1', 90'
2	31 August 1963	H	TSV 1860 München	3–3	25,000	Sturm 16', 80', Cyliax 27'
3	7 September 1963	A	FC Schalke 04	1–3	36,000	Wosab 6'
4	14 September 1963	H	1. FC Saarbrücken	2–1	18,000	Wosab 78', Konietzka 81'
5	21 September 1963	A	Karlsruher SC	3–1	35,000	H. Kurrat 4', Rylewicz 12', Cyliax 82'
6	5 October 1963	H	Eintracht Frankfurt	3–0	18,000	Emmerich 11', Redder 31', Konietzka 38'
7	12 October 1963	A	Preußen Münster	2–1	37,000	Brungs 65', Emmerich 82'
8	19 October 1963	H	Hertha BSC Berlin	7–2	28,000	Rylewicz 16' (pen.), Emmerich 22', 60', Schmidt 28', Konietzka 45', 85', Sturm 52'
9	26 October 1963	A	VfB Stuttgart	1–2	60,000	Sturm 60'
10	9 November 1963	H	1. FC Nürnberg	3–1	25,000	Emmerich 27', 86', Wenauer 81' (o.g.)
11	16 November 1963	H	1. FC Kaiserslautern	9–3	26,000	Brungs 8', Wosab 17', 74', Schmidt 18', 56', 66', Emmerich 28', 85', Konietzka 44'
12	23 November 1963	A	Meidericher SV	3–3	40,000	Konietzka 5', 33', Emmerich 20'
13	30 November 1963	H	1. FC Köln	2–3	42,000	Konietzka 7', 14'
14	21 December 1963	A	Hamburger SV	1–2	35,000	Wosab 7'
15	14 December 1963	H	Eintracht Braunschweig	3–0	15,000	Brungs 28', Konietzka 57', Wosab 81'
16	11 January 1964	H	Werder Bremen	4–3	15,000	Brungs 14', 20', Konietzka 16', 34'
17	18 January 1964	A	TSV 1860 München	1–6	35,000	Brungs 3'
18	25 January 1964	H	FC Schalke 04	3–0	38,000	Emmerich 51', 89', Konietzka 65'
19	30 March 1964	A	1. FC Saarbrücken	1–2	18,000	Emmerich 62'
20	15 February 1964	H	Karlsruher SC	3–2	21,000	Rylewicz 28', 48', Cyliax 38'
21	22 February 1964	A	Eintracht Frankfurt	1–2	40,000	Eigenbrodt 71' (o.g.)
22	29 February 1964	H	Preußen Münster	0–0	25,000	
23	7 March 1964	A	Hertha BSC Berlin	0–0	20,510	
24	14 March 1964	H	VfB Stuttgart	7–1	28,000	Konietzka 8', 55', 59', 88', Brungs 26', Emmerich 70', 74'
25	21 March 1964	A	1. FC Nürnberg	0–4	43,000	
26	4 April 1964	A	1. FC Kaiserslautern	1–0	30,000	Konietzka 40'
27	11 April 1964	H	Meidericher SV	0–0	23,000	
28	18 April 1964	A	1. FC Köln	2–5	46,000	Schmidt 22', Brungs 62'
29	5 May 1964	H	Hamburger SV	5–2	8,000	Rylewicz 31', Emmerich 38', 64', Brungs 55', Redder 85'
30	9 May 1964	A	Eintracht Braunschweig	0–2	15,000	

=== European Cup ===
Win Draw Loss

Note: Results are given with Borussia Dortmund score listed first.

Game	Date	Venue	Opponent	Result F–A	Attendance	Borussia Dortmund Goalscorers
PR1	11 September 1963	A	FK Lyn	4–2	18,159	Emmerich 18', Schmidt 60', Wosab 65', 76'
PR2	2 October 1963	H	FK Lyn	3–1	10,700	Konietzka 35', 82', Cyliax 86'
FR1	6 November 1963	A	S.L. Benfica	1–2	41,252	Wosab 54'
FR2	4 December 1963	H	S.L. Benfica	5–0	40,675	Konietzka 33', Brungs 35', 37', 47', Wosab 58'
QF1	4 March 1964	A	Dukla Prague	4–0	21,920	Brungs 30', Konietzka 56', Wosab 70' (pen.), 89'
QF2	18 March 1964	H	Dukla Prague	1–3	42,415	Rylewicz 20'
SF1	15 April 1964	H	Internazionale	2–2	42,356	Brungs 23', 28'
SF2	29 April 1964	A	Internazionale	0–2	76,788	

=== DFB-Pokal ===
Win Draw Loss

Note: Results are given with Borussia Dortmund score listed first.

Game	Date	Venue	Opponent	Result F–A	Attendance	Borussia Dortmund Goalscorers
1	7 April 1964	A	TSV 1860 München	0–2	35,000	

== See also ==
- 1963–64 Bundesliga
- 1963–64 European Cup
- 1963–64 DFB-Pokal
