= List of Borussia Dortmund records and statistics =

Football club records and statistics

This list has details on Borussia Dortmund records and statistics.

== Head coaches ==
In July 1935, Fritz Thelen became the club's first full-time head coach, but was not available in the first months of the season, forcing Dortmund player and Germany international Ernst Kuzorra to take over instead. In 1966, Willi Multhaup led his side to the European Cup Winners' Cup, the first German team to win a European trophy. Horst Köppel was the coach to bring major silverware to the club for the first time in over 20 years, winning the DFB-Pokal in 1989.

Ottmar Hitzfeld is the club's most successful coach, having won both the Bundesliga and Supercup twice. In 1997, Dortmund had waited for continental success for over 30 years; Hitzfeld crowned his period with an unexpected triumph and won the Champions League. Dortmund won the Intercontinental Cup in 1997 and head coach Nevio Scala became the first and so far the only non-native speaker who won a major title. In 2001–02, Matthias Sammer, a former BVB player, brought the league title back to Dortmund. In 2008–09, the club approached Mainz 05 head coach Jürgen Klopp. He won the club's seventh championship title in 2010–11. In his fourth season, Dortmund won the Bundesliga and the DFB-Pokal to complete the first league and cup double in the club's history.

The current coach is Niko Kovač.

As of 7 November 2026

No.	Coach	Period			Record					Honours won
No.	Coach	From	Until	Days	Pld	W	D	L	Win%	Honours won
1	(Austria) Anton Cargnelli	1 July 1923	31 December 1923	183	?	?	?	?	?	
2	(Germany) Ernst Kuzorra (interim)	1 July 1935	31 August 1935	61	?	?	?	?	?	
3	(Germany) Fritz Thelen	1 September 1935	31 May 1936	273	?	?	?	?	?	
4	(Germany) Ferdinand Swatosch	1 July 1936	30 June 1938	1,094	5	3	1	1	60.00	
5	(Germany) Willi Sevcik	1 July 1938	30 June 1939	364	?	?	?	?	?	
6	(Germany) Fritz Thelen	10 January 1946	31 July 1946	202	?	?	?	?	?	
7	(Germany) Ferdinand Fabra	28 February 1947	30 June 1948	488	30	20	3	7	66.67	1 Oberliga West
8	(Austria) Eduard Havlicek	1 August 1948	30 June 1950	698	53	36	8	9	67.92	1 Oberliga West
9	(Germany) Hans-Josef Kretschmann	1 April 1950	30 June 1951	455	36	17	12	7	47.22	1 Oberliga West
10	(Germany) Hans Schmidt	1 August 1951	30 June 1955	1,429	128	64	25	39	50.00	1 Oberliga West
11	(Germany) Helmut Schneider	1 August 1955	30 June 1957	699	80	51	14	15	63.75	2 Oberliga West, 2 Championships
12	(Germany) Hans Tauchert	1 August 1957	30 June 1958	333	35	16	8	11	45.71	
13	(Austria) Max Merkel	1 July 1958	31 July 1961	1,126	104	52	22	30	50.00	
14	(Germany) Hermann Eppenhoff	1 July 1961	30 June 1965	1,460	152	81	23	48	53.29	1 Championship, 1 Cup
15	(Germany) Willi Multhaup	1 July 1965	30 June 1966	364	44	26	10	8	59.09	1 European Cup Winners' Cup
16	(Germany) Heinz Murach	1 July 1966	10 April 1968	649	69	27	18	24	39.13	
17	(Germany) Oswald Pfau	18 April 1968	16 December 1968	242	23	8	4	11	34.78	
18	(Germany) Helmut Schneider	17 December 1968	17 March 1969	90	9	2	1	6	22.22	
19	(Germany) Hermann Lindemann	21 March 1969	15 May 1970	420	44	18	11	15	40.91	
20	(Germany) Helmut Bracht (interim)	16 May 1970	30 June 1970	45	6	3	0	3	50.00	
21	(Germany) Horst Witzler	1 July 1970	21 December 1971	538	62	15	16	31	24.19	
22	(Germany) Herbert Burdenski	3 January 1972	28 February 1973	422	47	17	14	16	36.17	
23	(Germany) Detlev Brüggemann	1 March 1973	30 April 1973	60	8	3	1	4	37.50	
24	(Germany) Max Michallek (interim)	30 April 1973	30 June 1973	61	2	1	0	1	50.00	
25	(Hungary) János Bédl	1 July 1973	14 February 1974	228	27	14	5	8	51.85	
26	(Germany) Dieter Kurrat	15 February 1974	30 June 1974	135	11	3	3	5	27.27	
27	(Germany) Otto Knefler	1 July 1974	1 February 1976	580	70	34	20	16	48.57	
28	(Germany) Horst Buhtz	1 February 1976	14 June 1976	134	17	11	2	4	64.71	
29	(Germany) Otto Rehhagel	15 June 1976	30 April 1978	684	75	30	16	29	40.00	
30	(Germany) Sigfried Held (interim)	1 May 1978	30 June 1978	60	0	0	0	0	—	
31	(Germany) Carl-Heinz Rühl	1 July 1978	29 April 1979	302	34	11	10	13	32.35	
32	(Germany) Uli Maslo (interim)	30 April 1979	30 June 1979	61	5	2	2	1	40.00	
33	(Germany) Udo Lattek	1 July 1979	10 May 1981	679	73	33	15	25	45.21	
34	(Germany) Rolf Bock (interim)	11 May 1981	30 June 1981	50	4	1	2	1	25.00	
35	(Socialist Federal Republic of Yugoslavia) Branko Zebec	1 July 1981	30 June 1982	364	37	20	5	12	54.05	
36	(Germany) Karl-Heinz Feldkamp	1 July 1982	5 April 1983	278	33	19	5	9	57.58	
37	(Germany) Helmut Witte (interim)	6 April 1983	30 June 1983	85	8	1	3	4	12.50	
38	(Germany) Uli Maslo	1 July 1983	23 October 1983	114	12	3	2	7	25.00	
39	(Germany) Helmut Witte (interim)	23 October 1983	31 October 1983	8	1	0	0	1	0.00	
40	(Germany) Heinz-Dieter Tippenhauer	1 November 1983	15 November 1983	14	2	0	1	1	0.00	
41	(Germany) Horst Franz	16 November 1983	30 June 1984	227	20	8	5	7	40.00	
42	(Germany) Timo Konietzka	1 July 1984	24 October 1984	115	11	3	1	7	27.27	
43	(Germany) Reinhard Saftig (interim)	25 October 1984	27 October 1984	2	1	1	0	0	100.00	
44	(Germany) Erich Ribbeck	28 October 1984	30 June 1985	245	25	10	4	11	40.00	
45	(Hungary) Pál Csernai	1 July 1985	20 April 1986	293	37	13	7	17	35.14	
46	(Germany) Reinhard Saftig	21 April 1986	30 June 1988	801	86	33	24	29	38.37	
47	(Germany) Horst Köppel	1 July 1988	30 June 1991	1,094	122	52	39	31	42.62	1 Cup, 1 Supercup
48	(Germany) Ottmar Hitzfeld	1 July 1991	30 June 1997	2,191	273	149	60	64	54.58	2 Championships, 2 Supercups, 1 Champions League
49	(Italy) Nevio Scala	1 July 1997	30 June 1998	364	52	21	13	18	40.38	1 Intercontinental Cup
50	(Germany) Michael Skibbe	1 July 1998	4 February 2000	583	68	30	19	19	44.12	
51	(Austria) Bernd Krauss	6 February 2000	13 April 2000	67	13	0	5	8	0.00	
52	(Germany) Udo Lattek (interim)	14 April 2000	30 June 2000	77	5	2	2	1	40.00	
53	(Germany) Matthias Sammer	1 July 2000	30 June 2004	1,460	185	91	45	49	49.19	1 Championship
54	(Netherlands) Bert van Marwijk	1 July 2004	18 December 2006	900	95	35	32	28	36.84	
55	(Germany) Jürgen Röber	19 December 2006	12 March 2007	83	8	2	0	6	25.00	
56	(Germany) Thomas Doll	13 March 2007	30 June 2008	475	49	20	11	18	40.82	
57	(Germany) Jürgen Klopp	1 July 2008	30 June 2015	2,555	318	180	65	73	56.60	2 Championships, 1 Cup, 2 Supercups
58	(Germany) Thomas Tuchel	1 July 2015	30 June 2017	730	107	69	20	18	64.49	1 Cup
59	(Netherlands) Peter Bosz	1 July 2017	9 December 2017	161	24	8	6	10	33.33	
60	(Austria) Peter Stöger	10 December 2017	30 June 2018	202	24	10	8	6	41.67	
61	(Switzerland) Lucien Favre	1 July 2018	13 December 2020	896	110	68	17	25	61.82	1 Supercup
62	(Germany) Edin Terzić (interim)	13 December 2020	30 June 2021	199	32	20	4	8	62.50	1 Cup
63	(Germany) Marco Rose	1 July 2021	20 May 2022	323	46	27	4	15	58.70	
64	(Germany) Edin Terzić	23 May 2022	13 June 2024	752	96	55	20	21	57.29	
65	(Turkey) Nuri Şahin	14 June 2024	22 January 2025	222	27	12	4	11	44.44	
66	(Denmark) Mike Tullberg (interim)	22 January 2025	2 February 2025	11	3	2	1	0	66.67	
67	(Croatia) Niko Kovač	2 February 2025		644	88	54	16	18	61.36	

== Club honours ==
=== Domestic ===
- German Championship/Bundesliga:
  - Winners (8): 1956, 1957, 1963, 1994–95, 1995–96, 2001–02, 2010–11, 2011–12
  - Runners-up (12): 1949, 1961, 1965–66, 1991–92, 2012–13, 2013–14, 2015–16, 2018–19, 2019–20, 2021–22, 2022–23, 2025–26 (record)
- 2. Bundesliga North:
  - Runners-up: 1975–76
- DFB-Pokal:
  - Winners (5): 1964–65, 1988–89, 2011–12, 2016–17, 2020–21
  - Runners-up (5): 1962–63, 2007–08, 2013–14, 2014–15, 2015–16
- DFB/DFL/Franz Beckenbauer Supercup:
  - Winners (6): 1989, 1995, 1996, 2013, 2014, 2019
  - Runners-up (7): 2011, 2012, 2016, 2017, 2020, 2021, 2026 (shared record)
- DFB-Ligapokal:
  - Runners-up: 2003

=== European ===
- UEFA Champions League:
  - Winners: 1996–97
  - Runners-up: 2012–13, 2023–24
- European Cup Winners' Cup:
  - Winners: 1965–66
- UEFA Cup:
  - Runners-up: 1992–93, 2001–02
- UEFA Super Cup:
  - Runners-up: 1997

=== International ===
- Intercontinental Cup:
  - Winners: 1997

=== Regional ===
- Oberliga West/West German Championship:
  - Winners (6): 1947–48, 1948–49, 1949–50, 1952–53, 1955–56, 1956–57 (record)
  - Runners-up (2): 1960–61, 1962–63
- Westphalia Cup:
  - Winners (1): 1947

== Seasons ==
Since 1976, Borussia Dortmund have played in the Bundesliga, the top tier of the German football league system.

== Player records ==
As of 23 August 2025

=== Most appearances ===
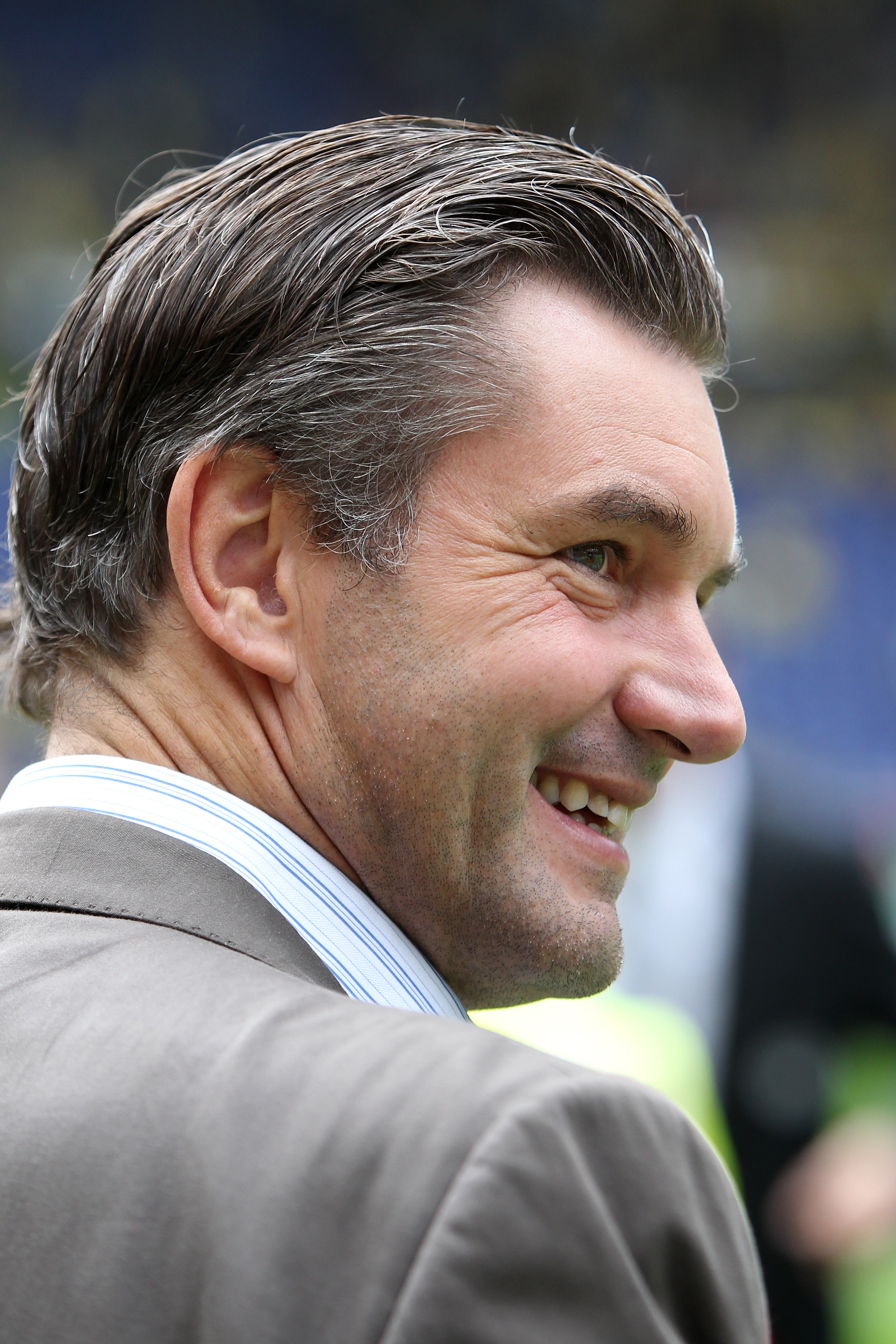
Michael Zorc made 572 first team appearances for Borussia Dortmund

Bold signifies current Borussia Dortmund player.

Rank	Player	Position	Period	Appearances
1	(Germany) Michael Zorc	MF	1981–1998	572
2	(Germany) Mats Hummels	DF	2008–2016; 2019–2024	508
3	(Germany) Roman Weidenfeller	GK	2002–2018	453
4	(Germany) Marco Reus	MF	2012–2024	429
5	(Germany) Stefan Reuter	MF	1992–2004	421
6	(Germany) Lars Ricken	MF	1993–2008	407
7	(Brazil) Dedé	DF	1998–2011	398
8	(Germany) Dieter Kurrat	MF	1960–1974	382
8	(Poland) Łukasz Piszczek	DF	2010–2021	382
10	(Germany) Lothar Huber	DF	1974–1986	372

=== Top goalscorers ===
Bold signifies current Borussia Dortmund player.

Rank	Player	Position	Period	Goals	Games	Average
1	(Germany) Alfred Preissler	FW	1945–1950; 1952–1959	177	274	0.65
2	(Germany) Marco Reus	MF	2012–2024	170	429	0.4
3	(Germany) Michael Zorc	MF	1981–1998	159	572	0.28
4	(Germany) Manfred Burgsmüller	FW	1976–1983	158	252	0.63
5	(Germany) Friedhelm Konietzka	FW	1958–1965	155	196	0.79
6	(Germany) Lothar Emmerich	FW	1960–1969	148	249	0.59
7	(Germany) Jürgen Schütz	FW	1959–1963; 1969–1972	143	214	0.67
8	(Gabon) Pierre-Emerick Aubameyang	FW	2013–2018	141	213	0.66
9	(Germany) Alfred Niepieklo	MF	1951–1960	125	201	0.62
10	(Germany) Alfred Kelbassa	FW	1954–1963	124	218	0.57

=== Youngest goalscorers ===
Bold signifies current Borussia Dortmund player.

Rank	Player	Date of birth	First goal	Opponent	Result	Competition	Age	Position	Total goals	Total period
1	(Germany) Youssoufa Moukoko	20 November 2004	18 December 2020	(Germany) Union Berlin	2–1	Bundesliga	16 years, 28 days	FW	18	2020–2025
2	(England) Jude Bellingham	29 June 2003	14 September 2020	(Germany) MSV Duisburg	0–5	DFB-Pokal	17 years, 2 months, 16 days	MF	24	2020–2023
3	(Turkey) Nuri Şahin	5 September 1988	26 November 2005	(Germany) 1. FC Nürnberg	1–2	Bundesliga	17 years, 2 months, 21 days	MF	26	2005–2011; 2013–2018
4	(United States) Giovanni Reyna	13 November 2002	4 February 2020	(Germany) Werder Bremen	3–2	DFB-Pokal	17 years, 2 months, 22 days	MF	19	2020–2025
5	(Germany) Tom Rothe	29 October 2004	16 April 2022	(Germany) VfL Wolfsburg	6–1	Bundesliga	17 years, 5 months, 18 days	DF	1	2022–2024
6	(United States) Christian Pulisic	18 September 1998	17 April 2016	(Germany) Hamburger SV	3–0	Bundesliga	17 years, 6 months, 30 days	FW	19	2016–2019
7	(Germany) Lars Ricken	10 July 1976	11 March 1994	(Germany) MSV Duisburg	2–1	Bundesliga	17 years, 8 months, 1 day	MF	69	1993–2008
8	(Ghana) Ibrahim Tanko	25 July 1977	1 April 1995	(Germany) KFC Uerdingen 05	3–1	Bundesliga	17 years, 8 months, 7 days	FW	3	1995–2001
9	(Germany) Marc-André Kruska	29 June 1987	21 May 2005	(Germany) Hansa Rostock	2–1	Bundesliga	17 years, 10 months, 22 days	MF	2	2004–2009
10	(Germany) Ralf Augustin	27 September 1960	9 September 1978	(Germany) VfB Stuttgart	4–3	Bundesliga	17 years, 10 months, 22 days	FW	3	1978–1981

== Club captains ==
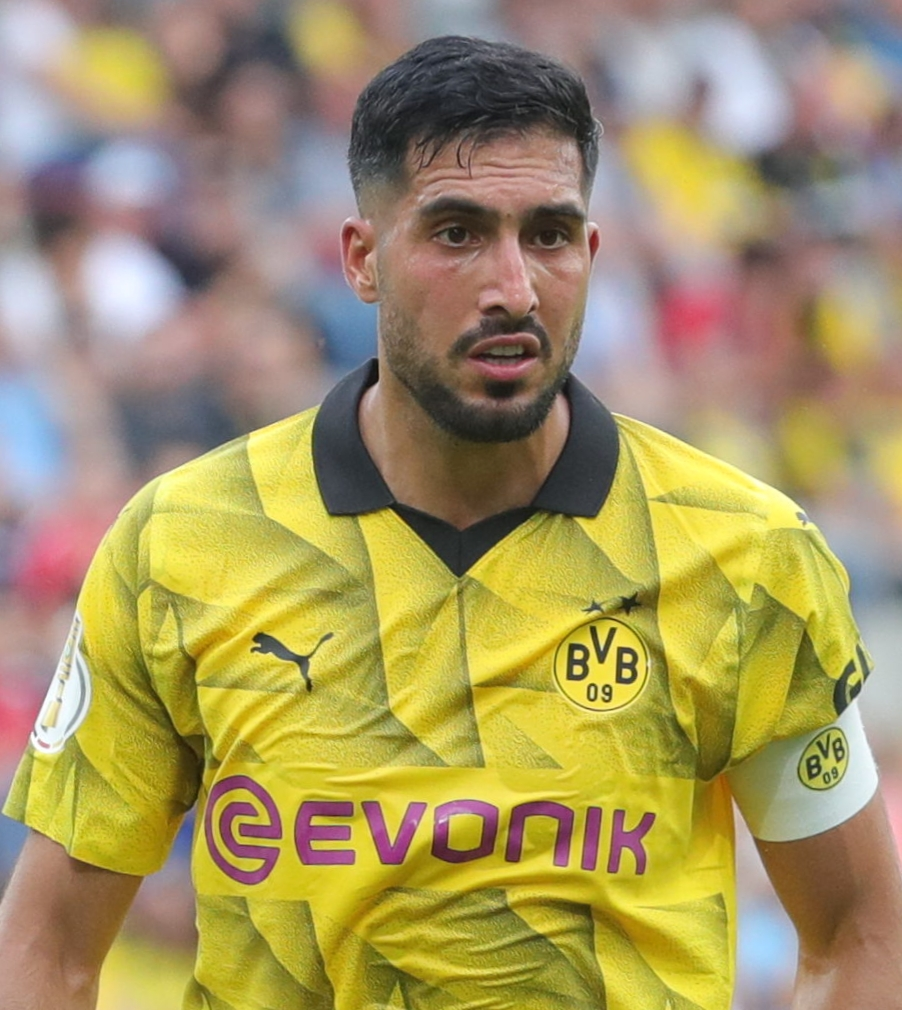
Emre Can, the current club captain

Since 1963, 19 players have held the position of club captain for Borussia Dortmund. The first club captain after the introduction of the Bundesliga was Alfred Schmidt, who was captain from 1963 to 1965. The longest-serving captain Michael Zorc, who was club captain from 1988 to 1998, has the distinction of having won the most trophies as captain; he won two Bundesliga titles, one DFB-Pokal, three DFL-Supercups and one UEFA Champions League. The current club captain is Emre Can, who took over after Marco Reus stepped down from his role as the club's captain for the 2023–24 season.

No.	Player	Period			Honours won as Captain
No.	Player	Before	Captain	After	Honours won as Captain
1	(Germany) Aki Schmidt	1956–1963	1963–1965	1965–1968	1x DFB-Pokal
2	(Germany) Wolfgang Paul	1961–1965	1965–1968	1968–1971	1x European Cup Winners' Cup
3	(Germany) Sigfried Held	1965–1968	1968–1971	1977–1979	
4	(Germany) Dieter Kurrat	1960–1971	1971–1974		
5	(Germany) Klaus Ackermann		1974–1977	1977–1979	
6	(Germany) Lothar Huber	1974–1977	1977–1979	1979–1986	
7	(Germany) Manfred Burgsmüller	1976–1979	1979–1983		
8	(Germany) Rolf Rüssmann	1980–1983	1983–1985		
9	(Germany) Dirk Hupe		1985–1987	1987–1989	
10	(Germany) Frank Mill	1986–1987	1987–1988	1988–1994	
11	(Germany) Michael Zorc	1981–1988	1988–1998		2x Bundesliga, 1x DFB-Pokal, 3x DFB-Supercup, 1x UEFA Champions League, 1x Intercontinental Cup
12	(Germany) Stefan Reuter	1992–1998	1998–2003	2003–2004	1x Bundesliga
13	(Germany) Christoph Metzelder	2000–2003	2003–2004	2004–2007	
14	(Germany) Christian Wörns	1999–2004	2004–2008		
15	(Germany) Sebastian Kehl	2002–2008	2008–2014	2014–2015	2x Bundesliga, 1x DFL-Supercup
16	(Germany) Mats Hummels	2008–2014	2014–2016	2019–2024	1x DFL-Supercup
17	(Germany) Marcel Schmelzer	2008–2016	2016–2018	2018–2022	1x DFB-Pokal
18	(Germany) Marco Reus	2012–2018	2018–2023	2023–2024	1x DFB-Pokal, 1x DFL-Supercup
19	(Germany) Emre Can	2020–2023	2023–		

== Transfers ==
French forward Ousmane Dembélé is both Borussia Dortmund's record signing and record sale.

=== Highest transfer fees paid ===
Rank	Player	From	Fee	Year
1	(France) Ousmane Dembélé	(France) Rennes	€35,000,000	2016
2	(Ivory Coast) Sébastien Haller	(Netherlands) Ajax	€31,000,000	2022
3	(Germany) Mats Hummels	(Germany) Bayern Munich	€30,500,000	2019
3	(England) Jobe Bellingham	(England) Sunderland	€30,500,000	2025
5	(England) Jude Bellingham	(England) Birmingham City	€30,150,000	2020
6	(Germany) André Schürrle	(Germany) VfL Wolfsburg	€30,000,000	2016
6	(Netherlands) Donyell Malen	(Netherlands) PSV Eindhoven	€30,000,000	2021
6	(Germany) Karim Adeyemi	(Austria) Red Bull Salzburg	€30,000,000	2022
6	(Germany) Felix Nmecha	(Germany) VfL Wolfsburg	€30,000,000	2023
6	(Greece) Konstantinos Karetsas	(Belgium) Genk	€30,000,000	2026

=== Highest transfer fees received ===
Rank	Player	To	Fee	Year
1	(France) Ousmane Dembélé	(Spain) Barcelona	€148,000,000	2017
2	(England) Jude Bellingham	(Spain) Real Madrid	€127,000,000	2023
3	(England) Jadon Sancho	(England) Manchester United	€85,000,000	2021
4	(United States) Christian Pulisic	(England) Chelsea	€64,000,000	2019
5	(Gabon) Pierre-Emerick Aubameyang	(England) Arsenal	€63,750,000	2018
6	(Norway) Erling Haaland	(England) Manchester City	€60,000,000	2022
7	(England) Jamie Gittens	(England) Chelsea	€56,000,000	2025
8	(Armenia) Henrikh Mkhitaryan	(England) Manchester United	€42,000,000	2016
9	(Germany) Mario Götze	(Germany) Bayern Munich	€37,000,000	2013
10	(Germany) Mats Hummels	(Germany) Bayern Munich	€35,000,000	2016

== Player honours ==
=== Individual honours ===
The following players won these awards while playing for Borussia Dortmund.

Honour	Player(s)	Year(s)
Ballon d'Or	(Germany) Matthias Sammer	1996
Kopa Trophy	(England) Jude Bellingham	2023
Footballer of the Year (Germany)	(Germany) Hans Tilkowski	1965
Footballer of the Year (Germany)	(Germany) Matthias Sammer	1995, 1996
Footballer of the Year (Germany)	(Germany) Jürgen Kohler	1997
Footballer of the Year (Germany)	(Germany) Marco Reus	2019
Player of the Year (Germany national team)	(Germany) Marco Reus	2018
Player of the Year (Germany national team)	(Germany) Emre Can	2023
Golden Boy	(Germany) Mario Götze	2011
Golden Boy	(Norway) Erling Haaland	2020
Golden Boy	(England) Jude Bellingham	2023
Bravo Award	(Germany) Christoph Metzelder	2002
UEFA Champions League Best Forward	(Norway) Erling Haaland	2021
Bundesliga Player of the Season	(Norway) Erling Haaland	2020–21
Bundesliga Player of the Season	(England) Jude Bellingham	2022–23
Bundesliga Rookie of the Season	(Germany) Karim Adeyemi	2022–23

=== International honours ===
==== FIFA World Cup ====
The following players won the FIFA World Cup while playing for Borussia Dortmund.

Year	Host	National team	Player(s)
1954	Switzerland	West Germany	Heinz Kwiatkowski
1990	Italy	West Germany	Frank Mill
1990	Italy	West Germany	Andreas Möller
2014	Brazil	Germany	Erik Durm
2014	Brazil	Germany	Kevin Großkreutz
2014	Brazil	Germany	Mats Hummels
2014	Brazil	Germany	Roman Weidenfeller

==== FIFA Confederations Cup ====
The following players won the FIFA Confederations Cup while playing for Borussia Dortmund.

Year	Host	National team	Player(s)
2017	Russia	Germany	Matthias Ginter

==== Continental football championships ====
===== AFC Asian Cup =====
The following players won the AFC Asian Cup while playing for Borussia Dortmund.

Year	Host	National team	Player(s)
2011	Qatar	Japan	Shinji Kagawa
2015	Australia	Australia	Mitchell Langerak

===== Africa Cup of Nations =====
The following players won the Africa Cup of Nations while playing for Borussia Dortmund.

Year	Host	National team	Player(s)
2010	Angola	Egypt	Mohamed Zidan
2023	Ivory Coast	Ivory Coast	Sébastien Haller

===== CONCACAF Nations League =====
The following players won the CONCACAF Nations League while playing for Borussia Dortmund.

Year	Host	National team	Player(s)
2021	United States	United States	Giovanni Reyna
2023	United States	United States	Giovanni Reyna

===== UEFA European Championship =====
The following players won the UEFA European Championship while playing for Borussia Dortmund.

Year	Host	National team	Player(s)
1980	Italy	West Germany	Eike Immel
1980	Italy	West Germany	Miroslav Votava
1992	Sweden	Denmark	Flemming Povlsen
1996	England	Germany	Steffen Freund
1996	England	Germany	Jürgen Kohler
1996	England	Germany	Andreas Möller
1996	England	Germany	Stefan Reuter
1996	England	Germany	Matthias Sammer

===== UEFA Nations League =====
The following players won the UEFA Nations League while playing for Borussia Dortmund.

Year	Host	National team	Player(s)
2019	Portugal	Portugal	Raphaël Guerreiro
