= 1966 European Cup Winners' Cup final =

- Match programme cover
- Event: 1965–66 European Cup Winners' Cup
| Borussia Dortmund | Liverpool |
| (West Germany) | (England) |
| 2 | 1 |
- After extra time
- Date: 5 May 1966
- Venue: Hampden Park, Glasgow
- Referee: Pierre Schwinte (France)
- Attendance: 41,657

The 1966 European Cup Winners' Cup final was an association football match between Borussia Dortmund of West Germany and Liverpool of England played on 5 May 1966 at Hampden Park, Glasgow, Scotland. It was the final match of the 1965–66 season of Europe's secondary cup competition, the European Cup Winners' Cup. Both sides were competing in their first European final.

Each club needed to progress through four rounds to reach the final. The rounds were contested over two legs, with a match at each team's home ground. Borussia's ties varied from close affairs to comfortable victories. They beat Atlético Madrid by a single goal over two legs, while they defeated Floriana 13–1 on aggregate in the first round. Liverpool's ties were mainly close affairs. Only one of Liverpool's ties was won by more than two goals.

Watched by a crowd of 41,657, the first half was goalless. Dortmund took the lead in the second half when Sigfried Held scored, Liverpool equalised seven minutes later through Roger Hunt. The scores remained the same to the end of the second half, which meant the match went into extra time. Reinhard Libuda scored in extra-time for Dortmund, and with no further goals, Dortmund won the match 2–1 to win the Cup Winners' Cup and become the first German team to win a European trophy.

== Route to the final ==
=== Borussia Dortmund ===
Borussia Dortmund
| Round | Opponents | First leg | Second leg | Aggregate score |
|---|---|---|---|---|
| 1st | Floriana | 5–1 (a) | 8–0 (h) | 13–1 |
| 2nd | CSKA Sofia | 3–0 (h) | 2–4 (a) | 5–4 |
| Quarter-final | Atlético Madrid | 1–1 (a) | 1–0 (h) | 2–1 |
| Semi-final | West Ham United | 2–1 (a) | 3–1 (h) | 5–2 |

Dortmund gained entry to the competition by winning the 1964–65 DFB-Pokal, Germany's annual domestic cup competition. Their opponents in the first round were the Maltese cup winners Floriana. Dortmund won the first leg at Floriana's home ground the Independence Ground 5–1, and the second leg 8–0 at Dortmund's home ground Stadion Rote Erde, thus winning the tie 13–1 on aggregate.

Their opponents in the second round were Bulgarian cup winners' CSKA Sofia. The first leg was in Germany. Dortmund won 3–0 after goals from Wilhelm Sturm, Sigfried Held and Aki Schmidt. The second leg was played in Bulgaria at the Vasil Levski National Stadium. CSKA won the match 4–2, but Dortmund progressed to the quarter-finals after winning the tie 5–4 on aggregate.

Dortmund's opponents in the quarter-finals were Spanish cup winners' Atlético Madrid. The first leg held at Atlético's home ground the Metropolitano finished 1–1. Dortmund won the second leg 1–0 in Germany and progressed to the semi-finals courtesy of a 2–1 aggregate victory. Their opponents in the semi-finals were the previous season's champions West Ham United of England, who had England internationals Bobby Moore and Geoff Hurst in their side. The first leg at the Boleyn Ground, West Ham's home ground, was won 2–1 by Dortmund. Dortmund won the second leg in Germany 3–1, to win the tie 5–2 on aggregate and progress to the first Cup Winners' Cup final.

=== Liverpool ===
Liverpool
| Round | Opponents | First leg | Second leg | Aggregate score |
|---|---|---|---|---|
| 1st | Juventus | 0–1 (a) | 2–0 (h) | 2–1 |
| 2nd | Standard Liège | 3–1 (h) | 2–1 (a) | 5–2 |
| Quarter-final | Budapest Honvéd | 0–0 (a) | 2–0 (h) | 2–0 |
| Semi-final | Celtic | 0–1 (a) | 2–0 (h) | 2–1 |

Liverpool qualified for the Cup Winners' Cup by winning the 1964–65 FA Cup, England's annual domestic cup competition. Their opponents in the first round were Italian cup winners Juventus. The first leg was held at Juventus' home ground the Stadio Communale. With 81 minutes played and the score at 0–0, Gianfranco Leoncini scored for Juventus. The Italian side subsequently won the first leg 1–0. The second leg was held at Liverpool's home ground Anfield, and they won the match 2–0 with two first half goals from Chris Lawler and Geoff Strong. Thus they won the tie 2–1 on aggregate.

Their opponents in the second round were Belgian team Standard Liège. Liège were runners-up in the Belgian Cup to Anderlecht, but as Anderlecht had won the league this entitled them to compete in the European Cup and Liège took their place in the Cup Winners' Cup. Liverpool won the first leg in England 3–1 and a 2–1 victory at Liège's home ground Stade Maurice Dufrasne ensured a 5–2 aggregate victory.

In the quarter-finals Liverpool were drawn against Hungarian Cup winners Honvéd. The first leg at Honvéd's home ground the Bozsik József Stadion ended in a 0–0 draw. A 2–0 victory in the second leg in England ensured Liverpool won the tie 2–0 on aggregate to progress to the semi-finals. Liverpool's opponents in the semi-finals were Scottish Cup winners Celtic. Celtic won the first leg 1–0 at their home ground Celtic Park, thanks to a goal from Bobby Lennox. Liverpool needed to win the second leg at Anfield to progress to the final. Two goals from Tommy Smith and Geoff Strong secured a 2–0 victory. Liverpool won the tie 2–1 on aggregate to secure their place in their first European final.

== Match ==
=== Background ===
Both Liverpool and Borussia Dortmund were appearing in their first European final. It was Liverpool's second season in European competition, the previous season they had been eliminated in the semi-finals of the 1964–65 European Cup by Internazionale. Dortmund first competed in European competition in the 1956–57 European Cup, when they were eliminated in the second round. Their best performance in Europe to date was in the 1963–64 European Cup. Like Liverpool they were eliminated in the semi-finals by Internazionale.

As Bayern Munich had won the 1965–66 DFB-Pokal, Dortmund's only chance of participating in European football the following season was to win the Cup Winners' Cup. Liverpool had won the 1965–66 Football League, a victory over Chelsea ensured they became English champions. Their league success meant that whatever the result they would be competing in the European Cup the following season. Borussia Dortmund had finished as runners-up in the 1965–66 Fußball-Bundesliga, three points behind champions 1860 Munich.

=== Summary ===
The weather in Glasgow was stormy, with torrential rain nearly flooding Hampden Park. As a result, the stadium did not reach its normal capacity of 100,000, with 41,657 spectators attending the match. The first half was mostly uneventful as both teams negated the threat of the other. Despite this both sides had opportunities to take the lead. At the start of the match, Liverpool striker Ian St John had a shot cleared off the goal line and midway through the second half Dortmund defender Theodor Redder almost scored an own goal. Towards the end of the half, Dortmund began to have more of an attacking threat. They were only denied by a number of saves from Liverpool goalkeeper Tommy Lawrence, ensuring it remained 0–0 at half-time.

Liverpool had the majority of the possession up to this point, with Dortmund content to counter-attack. The tactic worked as Dortmund took lead in the 61st minute. Sigfried Held passed to Lothar Emmerich on the left hand side of the pitch, Emmerich played a lofted pass to Held, who volleyed the ball into the goal to give Dortmund a 1–0 lead. Seven minutes later Liverpool were level. Peter Thompson ran down the left hand side of the pitch and passed to Roger Hunt who scored to level the match at 1–1. The linesman on the left-hand side of the pitch signalled to the referee that the ball had gone out of play, yet the referee ignored him and allowed the goal to stand. There were few chances for either side until the end of the half when Liverpool had a chance to win the match, but Hunt's shot missed. With the scores still level at 1–1, the match went into extra-time.

The winning goal came in the 107th minute. A clearance by Liverpool goalkeeper Lawrence found Dortmund midfielder Reinhard Libuda. Libuda shot 35 yards from goal on the right hand side of the pitch. The shot went over Lawrence and Liverpool defender Ron Yeats hit the post and rebounded off Yeats into the Liverpool goal to give Dortmund a 2–1 lead. The score remained the same throughout the remainder of extra-time and Dortmund became the first German team to win the Cup Winners' Cup.

=== Details ===
5 May 1966
19:30 BST

| Borussia Dortmund (West Germany) | 2–1 (a.e.t.) | (England) Liverpool |
|---|---|---|
| Held 61'; Libuda 107' | Report | Hunt 68' |

Hampden Park, Glasgow
Attendance: 41,657
Referee: Pierre Schwinte (France)

| Borussia Dortmund | Liverpool |

| GK | 1 | (West Germany) Hans Tilkowski |
| SW | 5 | (West Germany) Wolfgang Paul (c) |
| RB | 2 | (West Germany) Gerhard Cyliax |
| CB | 6 | (West Germany) Rudi Assauer |
| LB | 3 | (West Germany) Theodor Redder |
| DM | 4 | (West Germany) Dieter Kurrat |
| DM | 10 | (West Germany) Wilhelm Sturm |
| AM | 8 | (West Germany) Aki Schmidt |
| RW | 7 | (West Germany) Reinhard Libuda |
| CF | 9 | (West Germany) Sigfried Held |
| LW | 11 | (West Germany) Lothar Emmerich |
Manager:
(West Germany) Willi Multhaup

| GK | 1 | (Scotland) Tommy Lawrence |
| RB | 2 | (England) Chris Lawler |
| CB | 5 | (Scotland) Ron Yeats (c) |
| LB | 3 | (England) Gerry Byrne |
| DM | 10 | (England) Tommy Smith |
| RM | 7 | (England) Ian Callaghan |
| CM | 4 | (England) Gordon Milne |
| CM | 6 | (Scotland) Willie Stevenson |
| LM | 11 | (England) Peter Thompson |
| CF | 8 | (England) Roger Hunt |
| CF | 9 | (Scotland) Ian St John |
Manager:
(Scotland) Bill Shankly

Assistant referees:
Michel Kitabdjian (France)
Robert Héliès (France)

== See also ==
- 1966 European Cup final
- 1966 Inter-Cities Fairs Cup final
- 1965–66 Liverpool F.C. season
- Borussia Dortmund in international football
- Liverpool F.C. in international football

== Bibliography ==
- Ponting, Ivan; Hale, Steve (1992). Liverpool In Europe. London: Guinness Publishing. ISBN 0-85112-569-7.
- Kelly, Stephen F. (1988). You'll Never Walk Alone. London: Queen Anne Press. ISBN 0-356-19594-5.
- Liversedge, Stan (1991). Liverpool: The Official Centenary History. London: Hamlyn Publishing Group. ISBN 0-600-57308-7.
