= 1963 DFB-Pokal final =

- Match programme cover
- Event: 1962–63 DFB-Pokal
Borussia Dortmund	Hamburger SV
0	3
- Date: 14 August 1963
- Venue: Niedersachsenstadion, Hanover
- Referee: Rudolf Kreitlein (Stuttgart)
- Attendance: 68,000

The 1963 DFB-Pokal final decided the winner of the 1962–63 DFB-Pokal, the 20th season of Germany's knockout football cup competition. It was played on 14 August 1963 at the Niedersachsenstadion in Hanover. Hamburger SV won the match 3–0 against Borussia Dortmund, to claim their 1st cup title.

== Route to the final ==
The DFB-Pokal began with 16 teams in a single-elimination knockout cup competition. There were a total of three rounds leading up to the final. Teams were drawn against each other, and the winner after 90 minutes would advance. If still tied, 30 minutes of extra time was played. If the score was still level, a replay would take place at the original away team's stadium. If still level after 90 minutes, 30 minutes of extra time was played. If the score was still level, a drawing of lots would decide who would advance to the next round.

Note: In all results below, the score of the finalist is given first (H: home; A: away).

Borussia Dortmund		Round	Hamburger SV
Opponent	Result	1962–63 DFB-Pokal	Opponent	Result
Sportfreunde Saarbrücken (H)	4–2	Round of 16	Bayern Hof (A)	5–2
1860 Munich (H)	3–1	Quarter-finals	1. FC Saarbrücken (H)	1–0
Werder Bremen (H)	2–0	Semi-finals	Wuppertaler SV (A)	1–0

== Match ==
=== Details ===
14 August 1963
17:30 CET

Borussia Dortmund	0–3	Hamburger SV
	Report	U. Seeler 31', 33', 84'

Niedersachsenstadion, Hanover
Attendance: 68,000
Referee: Rudolf Kreitlein (Stuttgart)

Borussia Dortmund	Hamburger SV

GK	1	(West Germany) Bernhard Wessel
RB		(West Germany) Wilhelm Burgsmüller (c)
LB		(West Germany) Lothar Geisler
RH		(West Germany) Dieter Kurrat
CH		(West Germany) Wilhelm Sturm
LH		(West Germany) Helmut Bracht
OR		(West Germany) Reinhold Wosab
IR		(West Germany) Alfred Schmidt
CF		(West Germany) Franz Brungs
IL		(West Germany) Burghard Rylewicz
OL		(West Germany) Gerhard Cyliax
Manager:
(West Germany) Hermann Eppenhoff

GK	1	(West Germany) Horst Schnorr
RB		(West Germany) Gerhard Krug
LB		(West Germany) Jürgen Kurbjuhn
RH		(West Germany) Willi Giesemann
CH		(West Germany) Hubert Stapelfeldt
LH		(West Germany) Dieter Seeler (c)
OR		(West Germany) Fritz Boyens
IR		(West Germany) Peter Wulf
CF		(West Germany) Uwe Seeler
IL		(West Germany) Ernst Kreuz
OL		(West Germany) Gert Dörfel
Manager:
(West Germany) Martin Wilke

Match rules

- 90 minutes.
- 30 minutes of extra time if necessary.
- Replay if scores still level.
- No substitutions.
