= 1961 German football championship =

1961 German championship
Deutsche Fußballmeisterschaft

Tournament details
- Country: West Germany
- Dates: 6 May – 24 June
- Teams: 9

Final positions
- Champions: 1. FC Nürnberg; 8th German title
- Runners-up: Borussia Dortmund
- European Cup: 1. FC Nürnberg

Tournament statistics
- Matches played: 26
- Goals scored: 111 (4.27 per match)
- Top goal scorer: Uwe Seeler (8 goals)

The 1961 German football championship was the culmination of the football season in the Federal Republic of Germany in 1960–61. 1. FC Nürnberg were crowned champions for a record eighth time after a group stage and a final, having previously won the title in 1921, 1922, 1924, 1925, 1927, 1936 and 1948. It was the club's first appearance in the final since its 1948 title.

On the strength of this title, the club participated in the 1961–62 European Cup, where 1. FCN lost to S.L. Benfica in the quarter-finals.

Runners-up Borussia Dortmund made its fourth appearance in the national title game, having lost the championship in 1949 and won it in 1956 and 1957.

The format used to determine the German champion was the same as the one used in the 1960 season. Nine clubs qualified for the tournament, with the runners-up of Southwest and South having to play a qualifying match. The remaining eight clubs then played a home-and-away round in two groups of four, with the two group winners entering the final.

== Qualified teams ==
The teams qualified through the 1960–61 Oberliga season:

| Club | Qualified from |
| Hamburger SV | Oberliga Nord champions |
| SV Werder Bremen | Oberliga Nord runners-up |
| 1. FC Köln | Oberliga West champions |
| Borussia Dortmund | Oberliga West runners-up |
| Hertha BSC Berlin | Oberliga Berlin champions |
| 1. FC Saarbrücken | Oberliga Südwest champions |
| Borussia Neunkirchen | Oberliga Südwest runners-up |
| 1. FC Nürnberg | Oberliga Süd champions |
| Eintracht Frankfurt | Oberliga Süd runners-up |

== Competition ==
=== Qualifying round ===
| Date | Match | | | Result | Stadium | Attendance |
| 6 May 1961 | Eintracht Frankfurt | – | Borussia Neunkirchen | 5-0 (2–0) | Ludwigshafen, Südweststadion | 35,000 |

=== Group 1 ===
| Pos | Team | Pld | W | D | L | GF | GA | GR | Pts | Qualification | BVB | SGE | HSV | FCS |
|---|---|---|---|---|---|---|---|---|---|---|---|---|---|---|
| 1 | Borussia Dortmund | 6 | 3 | 1 | 2 | 19 | 12 | 1.583 | 7 | Advance to final | — | 0–1 | 7–2 | 2–2 |
| 2 | Eintracht Frankfurt | 6 | 3 | 1 | 2 | 13 | 9 | 1.444 | 7 | | 1–2 | — | 4–2 | 1–1 |
| 3 | Hamburger SV | 6 | 3 | 0 | 3 | 14 | 19 | 0.737 | 6 | | 2–5 | 2–1 | — | 3–0 |
| 4 | 1. FC Saarbrücken | 6 | 1 | 2 | 3 | 11 | 17 | 0.647 | 4 | | 4–3 | 2–5 | 2–3 | — |

Source: RSSSF
Rules for classification: 1) Points; 2) Goal ratio.

Group phase - Group 1
| Match | | | Final result |
|---|---|---|---|
| Hamburger SV | - | Borussia Dortmund | 2:5 |
| Eintracht Frankfurt | - | 1. FC Saarbrücken | 1:1 |
| 1. FC Saarbrücken | - | Hamburger SV | 2:3 |
| Borussia Dortmund | - | Eintracht Frankfurt | 0:1 |
| Hamburger SV | - | Eintracht Frankfurt | 2:1 |
| Borussia Dortmund | - | 1. FC Saarbrücken | 2:2 |
| Eintracht Frankfurt | - | Hamburger SV | 4:2 |
| 1. FC Saarbrücken | - | Borussia Dortmund | 4:3 |
| Hamburger SV | - | 1. FC Saarbrücken | 3:0 |
| Eintracht Frankfurt | - | Borussia Dortmund | 1:2 |
| Borussia Dortmund | - | Hamburger SV | 7:2 |
| 1. FC Saarbrücken | - | Eintracht Frankfurt | 2:5 |

=== Group 2 ===
| Pos | Team | Pld | W | D | L | GF | GA | GR | Pts | Qualification | FCN | SVW | KOE | BSC |
|---|---|---|---|---|---|---|---|---|---|---|---|---|---|---|
| 1 | 1. FC Nürnberg | 6 | 4 | 2 | 0 | 18 | 9 | 2.000 | 10 | Advance to final | — | 4–0 | 3–3 | 3–3 |
| 2 | Werder Bremen | 6 | 2 | 2 | 2 | 8 | 11 | 0.727 | 6 | | 2–4 | — | 1–1 | 1–0 |
| 3 | 1. FC Köln | 6 | 1 | 3 | 2 | 11 | 12 | 0.917 | 5 | | 1–2 | 1–1 | — | 3–4 |
| 4 | Hertha BSC | 6 | 1 | 1 | 4 | 9 | 14 | 0.643 | 3 | | 0–2 | 1–3 | 1–2 | — |

Source: RSSSF
Rules for classification: 1) Points; 2) Goal ratio.

Group phase - Group 2
| Match | | | Final result |
|---|---|---|---|
| 1. FC Köln | - | Werder Bremen | 1:1 |
| Hertha BSC Berlin | - | 1. FC Nürnberg | 0:2 |
| 1. FC Nürnberg | - | 1. FC Köln | 3:3 |
| Werder Bremen | - | Hertha BSC Berlin | 1:0 |
| 1. FC Köln | - | Hertha BSC Berlin | 3:4 |
| Werder Bremen | - | 1. FC Nürnberg | 2:4 |
| Hertha BSC Berlin | - | 1. FC Köln | 1:2 |
| 1. FC Nürnberg | - | Werder Bremen | 4:0 |
| 1. FC Köln | - | 1. FC Nürnberg | 1:2 |
| Hertha BSC Berlin | - | Werder Bremen | 1:3 |
| Werder Bremen | - | 1. FC Köln | 1:1 |
| 1. FC Nürnberg | - | Hertha BSC Berlin | 3:3 |

=== Final ===
| Date | Match | | | Result | Stadium | Attendance |
| 24 June 1961 | 1. FC Nürnberg | – | Borussia Dortmund | 3–0 (2–0) | Hannover, Niedersachsenstadion | 82,000 |

1. FC Nürnberg:
| GK | 1 | (West Germany) Roland Wabra |
| RB | 2 | (West Germany) Paul Derbfuß |
| CB | 5 | (West Germany) Ferdinand Wenauer |
| LB | 3 | (West Germany) Helmut Hilpert |
| RH | 4 | (West Germany) Josef Zenger |
| LH | 6 | (West Germany) Stefan Reisch |
| OR | 7 | (West Germany) Gustav Flachenecker |
| IR | 8 | (West Germany) Max Morlock (c) |
| CF | 9 | (West Germany) Heinz Strehl 67' |
| IL | 10 | (West Germany) Heinrich Müller 44' |
| OL | 11 | (West Germany) Kurt Haseneder 6' |
Manager:
(West Germany) Herbert Widmayer

Borussia Dortmund:
| GK | 1 | (West Germany) Heinz Kwiatkowski (c) |
| RB | 2 | (West Germany) Wilhelm Burgsmüller |
| CB | 5 | (West Germany) Lothar Geisler |
| LB | 3 | (West Germany) Rolf Thiemann |
| RH | 4 | (West Germany) Dieter Kurrat |
| LH | 6 | (West Germany) Wolfgang Peters |
| OR | 7 | (West Germany) Alfred Kelbassa |
| IR | 8 | (West Germany) Aki Schmidt |
| CF | 9 | (West Germany) Jürgen Schütz |
| IL | 10 | (West Germany) Timo Konietzka |
| OL | 11 | (West Germany) Gerd Cyliax |
Manager:
(Austria) Max Merkel
