= List of Bundesliga top scorers by season =

This is a list of Bundesliga top scorers season by season. Since 1966, a trophy sponsored by the German football magazine Kicker, shaped in the form of a miniature artillery piece, has been awarded to the top scorer at the end of each season. It is formally named the "Kicker-Torjägerkanone" (literally "kicker goal hunter cannon"). Robert Lewandowski holds the records for most goals in a single season, with 41 goals scored in the 2020–21 campaign, and most consecutive awards won, with five. Lewandowski and Gerd Müller are the record holders for the most awards won, with seven. The latest recipient of the award is Harry Kane of Bayern Munich.

== Winners ==
Key

Player also won the European Golden Shoe (first awarded in 1968)
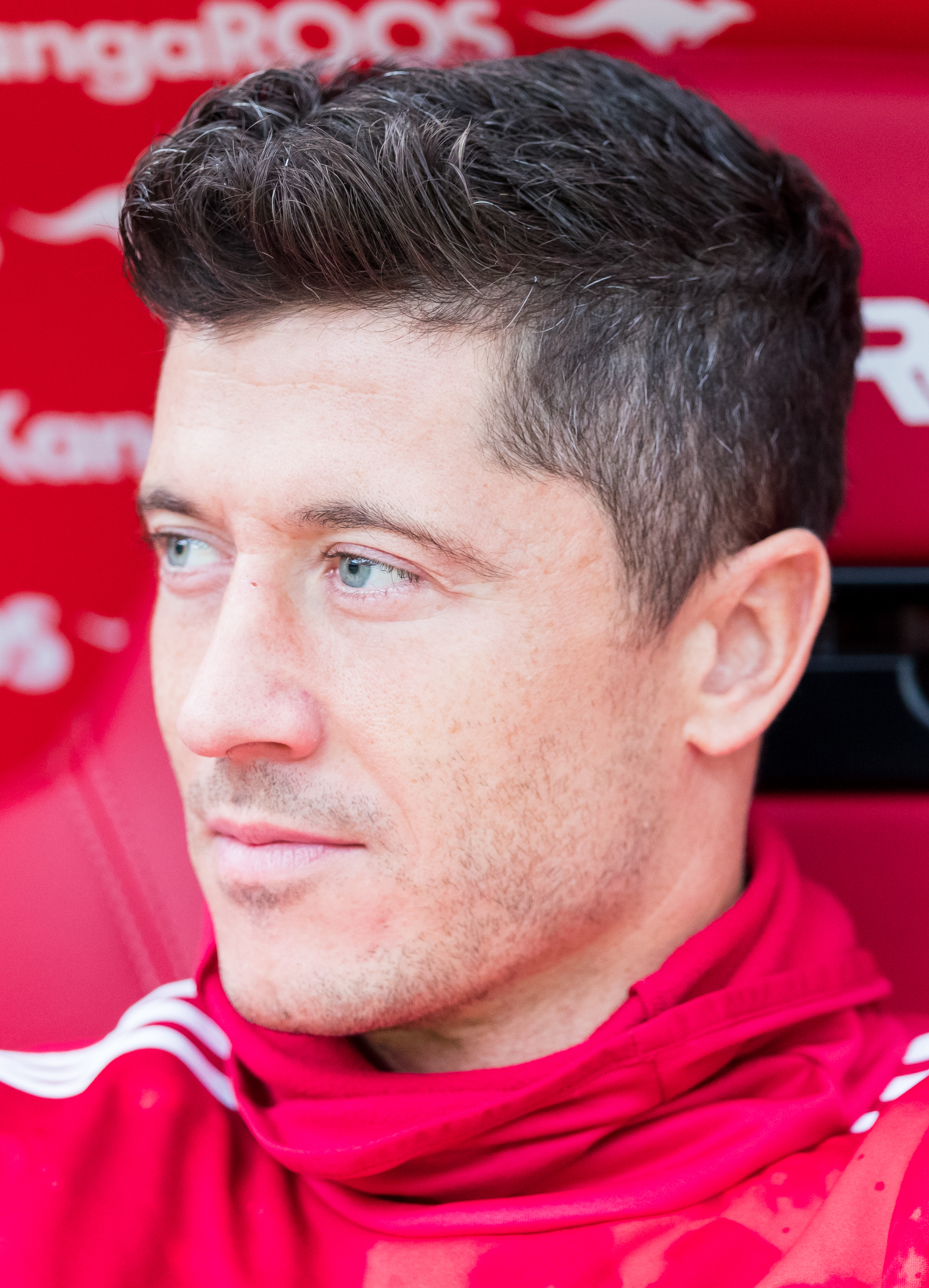
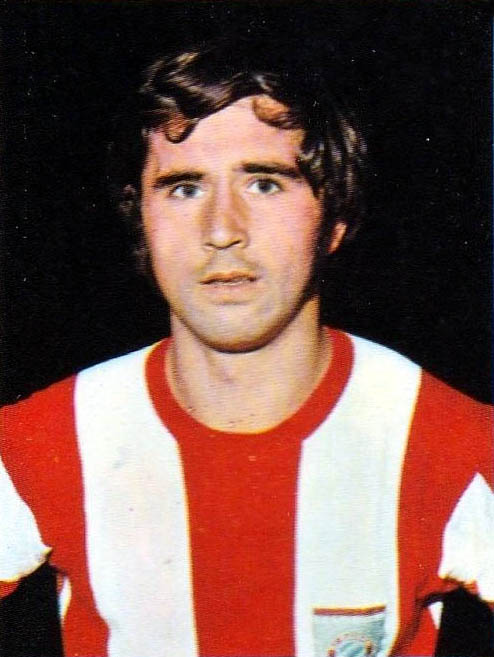
Robert Lewandowski (left) and Gerd Müller (right) won a record seven Torjägerkanonen during their careers.

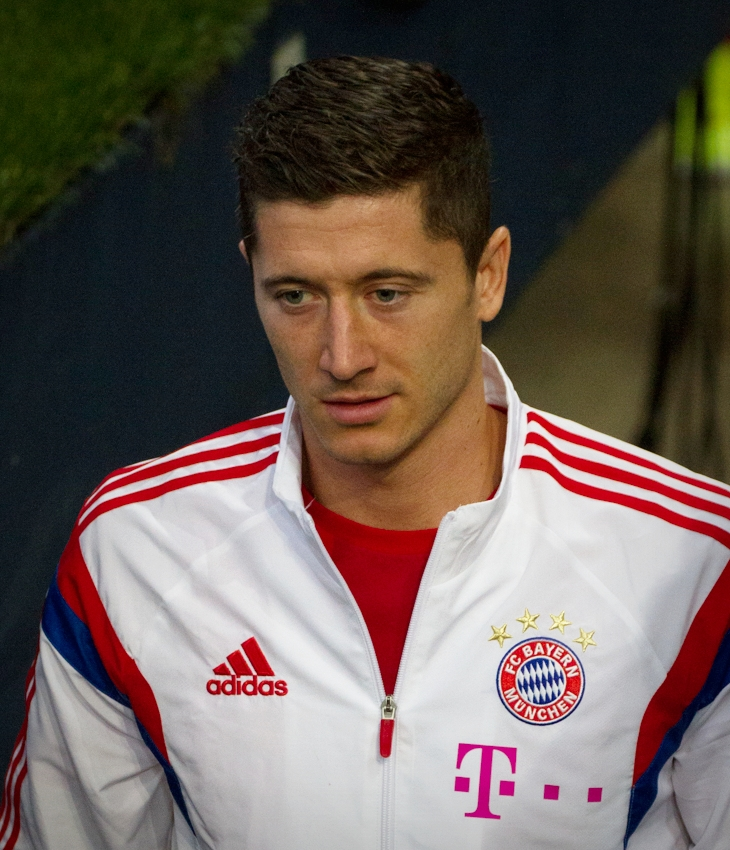
Robert Lewandowski holds the record for the most goals scored in a single Bundesliga season with 41.

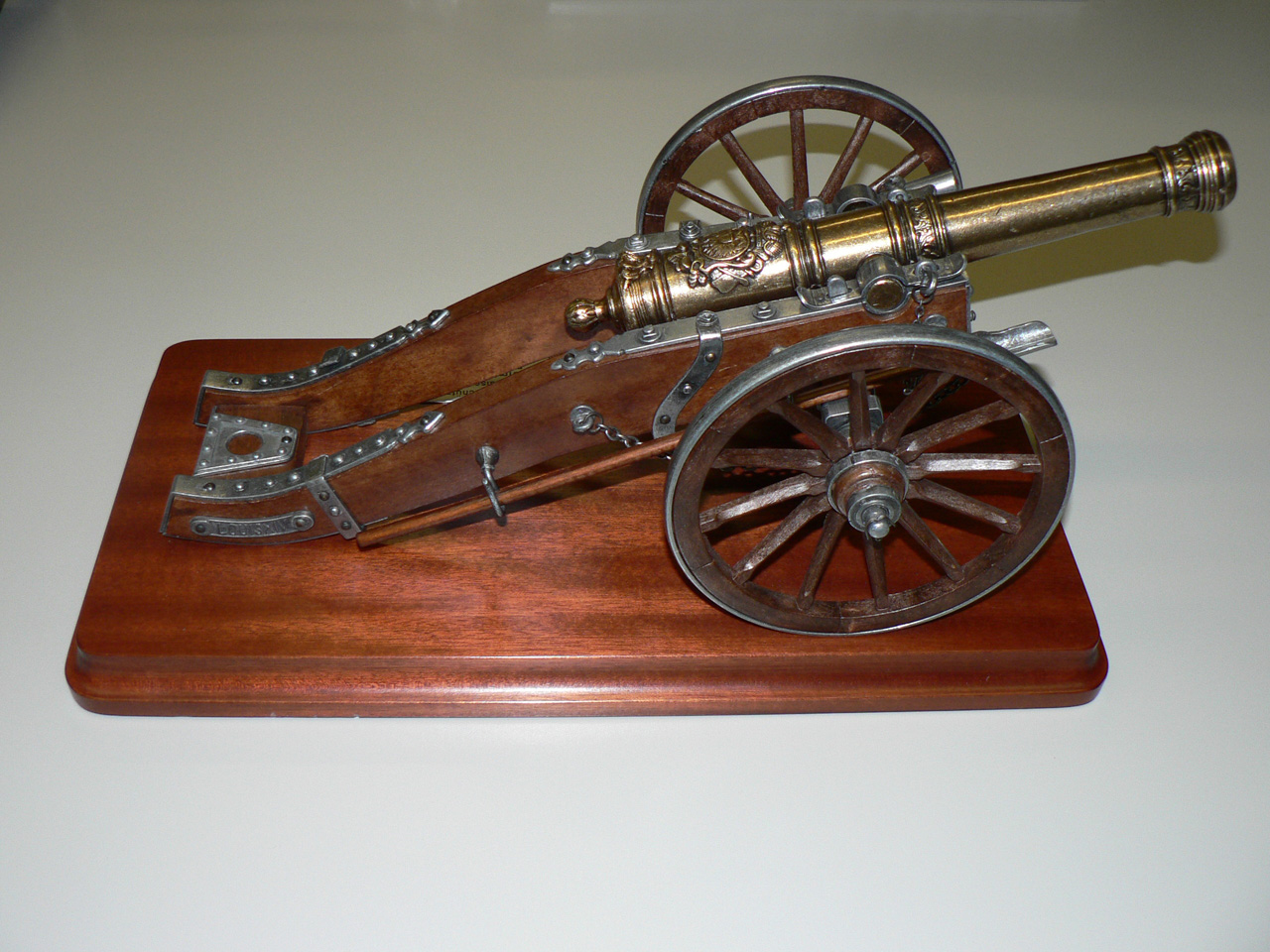
Every season, the Bundesliga top scorer receives the pictured top scorer canon (Torjägerkanone in German).

Season	Player(s)	Club(s)	Goals
1963–64	(Germany) Uwe Seeler	Hamburger SV	30
1964–65	(Germany) Rudolf Brunnenmeier	1860 Munich	24
1965–66	(Germany) Lothar Emmerich (1)	Borussia Dortmund	31
1966–67	(Germany) Lothar Emmerich (2)	Borussia Dortmund	28
1966–67	(Germany) Gerd Müller (1)	Bayern Munich	28
1967–68	(Germany) Hannes Löhr	1. FC Köln	27
1968–69	(Germany) Gerd Müller (2)	Bayern Munich	30
1969–70	(Germany) Gerd Müller (3)	Bayern Munich	38
1970–71	(Germany) Lothar Kobluhn	Rot-Weiß Oberhausen	24
1971–72	(Germany) Gerd Müller (4)	Bayern Munich	40
1972–73	(Germany) Gerd Müller (5)	Bayern Munich	36
1973–74	(Germany) Jupp Heynckes (1)	Borussia Mönchengladbach	30
1973–74	(Germany) Gerd Müller (6)	Bayern Munich	30
1974–75	(Germany) Jupp Heynckes (2)	Borussia Mönchengladbach	27
1975–76	(Germany) Klaus Fischer	Schalke 04	29
1976–77	(Germany) Dieter Müller (1)	1. FC Köln	34
1977–78	(Germany) Dieter Müller (2)	1. FC Köln	24
1977–78	(Germany) Gerd Müller (7)	Bayern Munich	24
1978–79	(Germany) Klaus Allofs (1)	Fortuna Düsseldorf	22
1979–80	(Germany) Karl-Heinz Rummenigge (1)	Bayern Munich	26
1980–81	(Germany) Karl-Heinz Rummenigge (2)	Bayern Munich	29
1981–82	(Germany) Horst Hrubesch	Hamburger SV	27
1982–83	(Germany) Rudi Völler	Werder Bremen	23
1983–84	(Germany) Karl-Heinz Rummenigge (3)	Bayern Munich	26
1984–85	(Germany) Klaus Allofs (2)	1. FC Köln	26
1985–86	(Germany) Stefan Kuntz (1)	VfL Bochum	22
1986–87	(Germany) Uwe Rahn	Borussia Mönchengladbach	24
1987–88	(Germany) Jürgen Klinsmann	VfB Stuttgart	19
1988–89	(Germany) Thomas Allofs	1. FC Köln	17
1988–89	(Germany) Roland Wohlfarth (1)	Bayern Munich	17
1989–90	(Norway) Jørn Andersen	Eintracht Frankfurt	18
1990–91	(Germany) Roland Wohlfarth (2)	Bayern Munich	21
1991–92	(Germany) Fritz Walter	VfB Stuttgart	22
1992–93	(Germany) Ulf Kirsten (1)	Bayer Leverkusen	20
1992–93	(Ghana) Tony Yeboah (1)	Eintracht Frankfurt	20
1993–94	(Germany) Stefan Kuntz (2)	1. FC Kaiserslautern	18
1993–94	(Ghana) Tony Yeboah (2)	Eintracht Frankfurt	18
1994–95	(Germany) Mario Basler	Werder Bremen	20
1994–95	(Germany) Heiko Herrlich	Borussia Mönchengladbach	20
1995–96	(Germany) Fredi Bobic	VfB Stuttgart	17
1996–97	(Germany) Ulf Kirsten (2)	Bayer Leverkusen	22
1997–98	(Germany) Ulf Kirsten (3)	Bayer Leverkusen	22
1998–99	(Germany) Michael Preetz	Hertha BSC	23
1999–2000	(Germany) Martin Max (1)	1860 Munich	19
2000–01	(Bosnia and Herzegovina) Sergej Barbarez	Hamburger SV	22
2000–01	(Denmark) Ebbe Sand	Schalke 04	22
2001–02	(Brazil) Márcio Amoroso	Borussia Dortmund	18
2001–02	(Germany) Martin Max (2)	1860 Munich	18
2002–03	(Spain) Thomas Christiansen	VfL Bochum	21
2002–03	(Brazil) Giovane Élber	Bayern Munich	21
2003–04	(Brazil) Aílton	Werder Bremen	28
2004–05	(Slovakia) Marek Mintál	1. FC Nürnberg	24
2005–06	(Germany) Miroslav Klose	Werder Bremen	25
2006–07	(Greece) Theofanis Gekas	VfL Bochum	20
2007–08	(Italy) Luca Toni	Bayern Munich	24
2008–09	(Brazil) Grafite	VfL Wolfsburg	28
2009–10	(Bosnia and Herzegovina) Edin Džeko	VfL Wolfsburg	22
2010–11	(Germany) Mario Gómez	Bayern Munich	28
2011–12	(Netherlands) Klaas-Jan Huntelaar	Schalke 04	29
2012–13	(Germany) Stefan Kießling	Bayer Leverkusen	25
2013–14	(Poland) Robert Lewandowski (1)	Borussia Dortmund	20
2014–15	(Germany) Alexander Meier	Eintracht Frankfurt	19
2015–16	(Poland) Robert Lewandowski (2)	Bayern Munich	30
2016–17	(Gabon) Pierre-Emerick Aubameyang	Borussia Dortmund	31
2017–18	(Poland) Robert Lewandowski (3)	Bayern Munich	29
2018–19	(Poland) Robert Lewandowski (4)	Bayern Munich	22
2019–20	(Poland) Robert Lewandowski (5)	Bayern Munich	34
2020–21	(Poland) Robert Lewandowski (6)	Bayern Munich	41
2021–22	(Poland) Robert Lewandowski (7)	Bayern Munich	35
2022–23	(Germany) Niclas Füllkrug	Werder Bremen	16
2022–23	(France) Christopher Nkunku	RB Leipzig	16
2023–24	(England) Harry Kane (1)	Bayern Munich	36
2024–25	(England) Harry Kane (2)	Bayern Munich	26
2025–26	(England) Harry Kane (3)	Bayern Munich	36

== Multiple winners ==
Rank	Player	Wins
1	(Poland) Robert Lewandowski	7
1	(Germany) Gerd Müller	7
3	(Germany) Karl-Heinz Rummenigge	3
3	(Germany) Ulf Kirsten	3
3	(England) Harry Kane	3
6	(Ghana) Tony Yeboah	2
6	(Germany) Jupp Heynckes	2
6	(Germany) Dieter Müller	2
6	(Germany) Klaus Allofs	2
6	(Germany) Lothar Emmerich	2
6	(Germany) Stefan Kuntz	2
6	(Germany) Roland Wohlfarth	2
6	(Germany) Martin Max	2

== See also ==
- List of Bundesliga top scorers
- Capocannoniere
- Premier League Golden Boot
- Bola de Prata (Portugal)
- List of La Liga top scorers
- Pichichi Trophy
- List of Süper Lig top scorers
- European Golden Shoe
- List of Ligue 1 top scorers
