= Kurrat (surname) =

Kurrat is a German surname. Notable people with the surname include:

- Dieter Kurrat (1942–2017), German footballer and coach
- Hans-Jürgen Kurrat (born 1944), German footballer, brother of Dieter
- Klaus-Dieter Kurrat (born 1955), German sprinter
