= List of Bundesliga top scorers =

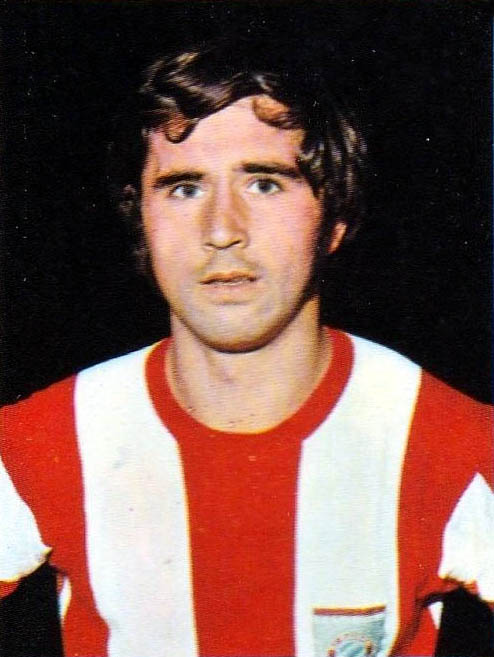
Gerd Müller has scored the most goals in Bundesliga history with 365.

Since the Bundesliga's introduction at the beginning of the 1963–64 season, a total of 57 players have scored 100 or more goals in the competition. The most successful goalscorer is Gerd Müller, becoming the first player to score 100 Bundesliga goals in the 1969–70 season, finishing his career with 365 goals. Harry Kane is the fastest player to reach 100 goals. With the exception of Aílton, each of the players listed represented their national team at least once.

Gerd Müller has been the Bundesliga's top scorer since 1970. Previous record scorers were Lothar Emmerich (1966–70), Timo Konietzka (1965–66) and Uwe Seeler (1964–65).

The most recent player to score 100 goals in the Bundesliga was Serge Gnabry, who scored his centennial goal on 25 October 2026. Of the active players still in the Bundesliga, Patrik Schick is the closest to making this list, having scored 99 Bundesliga goals.

== Bundesliga players with 100 or more goals ==
Key

- **Bold** shows players still playing in the Bundesliga.
- Italics show players still playing professional football in other leagues.

As of matches played 22 November 2026

Rank	Player	Goals	Apps	Ratio	First	Last	Club(s) (goals/apps)
1	(Germany) Gerd Müller	365	427	0.85	1965	1979	Bayern
2	(Poland) Robert Lewandowski	312	384	0.81	2010	2022	Dortmund (74/131), Bayern (238/253)
3	(Germany) Klaus Fischer	268	535	0.50	1968	1988	1860 Munich (28/60), Schalke (182/295), Köln (31/96), Bochum (27/84)
4	(Germany) Jupp Heynckes	220	369	0.60	1965	1978	M’gladbach (195/283), Hannover (25/86)
5	(Germany) Manfred Burgsmüller	213	447	0.48	1969	1990	Essen (32/74), Dortmund (135/224), Nürnberg (12/34), Bremen (34/115)
6	(Peru) Claudio Pizarro	197	490	0.40	1999	2020	Bremen (109/250), Bayern (87/224), Köln (1/16)
7	(Germany) Ulf Kirsten	181	350	0.52	1990	2003	Leverkusen
8	(Germany) Stefan Kuntz	179	449	0.40	1983	1999	Bochum (47/120), Uerdingen (32/94), K'lautern (75/170), Bielefeld (25/65)
9	(Germany) Dieter Müller	177	303	0.58	1973	1986	Offenbach (0/2), Köln (159/248), Stuttgart (14/30), Saarbrücken (4/23)
9	(Germany) Klaus Allofs	177	424	0.42	1975	1993	Düsseldorf (71/169), Köln (88/177), Bremen (18/78)
11	(Germany) Mario Gómez	170	328	0.52	2004	2019	Stuttgart (78/168), Bayern (75/115), Wolfsburg (17/45)
12	(Germany) Hannes Löhr	166	381	0.44	1964	1977	Köln
13	(Germany) Karl-Heinz Rummenigge	162	310	0.52	1974	1984	Bayern
14	(Germany) Bernd Hölzenbein	160	420	0.38	1967	1981	Frankfurt
15	(Germany) Fritz Walter	157	348	0.45	1983	1996	Mannheim (55/129), Stuttgart (102/216), Bielefeld (0/3)
16	(Germany) Marco Reus	156	391	0.40	2009	2024	M’gladbach (36/97), Dortmund (120/294)
17	(Germany) Thomas Müller	150	503	0.30	2008	2025	Bayern
18	(Germany) Thomas Allofs	148	378	0.39	1978	1992	Düsseldorf (57/182), K'lautern (61/126), Köln (30/70)
19	(Germany) Stefan Kießling	144	403	0.36	2003	2018	Nürnberg (13/59), Leverkusen (131/344)
20	(Croatia) **Andrej Kramarić**	141	330	0.43	2016	2026	**Hoffenheim**
20	(Germany) Bernd Nickel	141	426	0.33	1968	1983	Frankfurt
22	(Germany) Uwe Seeler	137	239	0.57	1963	1972	Hamburg
23	(Germany) Horst Hrubesch	136	224	0.61	1975	1985	Essen (38/48), Hamburg (96/159), Dortmund (2/17)
24	(Brazil) Giovane Élber	133	260	0.51	1994	2005	Stuttgart (41/87), Bayern (92/169), M’gladbach (0/4)
25	(Germany) Rudi Völler	132	232	0.57	1980	1996	1860 Munich (9/33), Bremen (97/137), Leverkusen (26/62)
26	(Germany) Michael Zorc	131	463	0.28	1981	1998	Dortmund
27	(Germany) Karl Allgöwer	129	338	0.38	1980	1991	Stuttgart
28	(Germany) Dieter Hoeneß	127	288	0.44	1977	1987	Bayern (102/224), Stuttgart (25/64)
28	(Bosnia and Herzegovina) Vedad Ibišević	127	344	0.37	2006	2020	Aachen (6/24), Hoffenheim (43/92), Stuttgart (33/86), Hertha (45/138), Schalke (0/4)
30	(Germany) Martin Max	126	396	0.32	1989	2004	M’gladbach (22/142), Schalke (33/109), 1860 Munich (51/112), Rostock (20/33)
31	(Germany) Georg Volkert	125	410	0.30	1965	1981	Nürnberg (37/136), Hamburg (62/214), Stuttgart (26/60)
32	(Germany) Frank Mill	123	387	0.32	1976	1996	Essen (3/19), M’gladbach (71/153), Dortmund (47/187), Düsseldorf (2/28)
33	(Germany) Herbert Laumen	121	267	0.45	1965	1974	M’gladbach (97/186), Bremen (18/60), K'lautern (6/21)
33	(Germany) Miroslav Klose	121	307	0.39	2000	2011	K'lautern (44/120), Bremen (53/89), Bayern (24/96)
33	(Germany) Lothar Matthäus	121	464	0.26	1979	2000	M’gladbach (36/162), Bayern (85/302)
36	(Germany) Roland Wohlfarth	120	287	0.42	1981	1997	Duisburg (1/17), Bayern (119/254), Bochum (0/16)
37	(Germany) Bernd Rupp	119	274	0.43	1965	1974	M’gladbach (50/119), Bremen (23/58), Köln (46/97)
37	(Germany) Ronnie Worm	119	380	0.31	1972	1985	Duisburg (71/231), Braunschweig (48/149)
39	(Germany) Pierre Littbarski	116	406	0.29	1978	1993	Köln
40	(Germany) Lothar Emmerich	115	183	0.63	1963	1969	Dortmund
41	(Germany) Reiner Geye	113	485	0.23	1971	1986	Düsseldorf (66/195), K'lautern (47/290)
42	(Germany) Kevin Kurányi	111	275	0.40	2001	2016	Stuttgart (40/99), Schalke (71/162), Hoffenheim (0/14)
43	(Germany) Jürgen Klinsmann	110	221	0.50	1984	1997	Stuttgart (79/156), Bayern (31/65)
43	(Germany) Andreas Möller	110	429	0.26	1986	2004	Frankfurt (33/115), Dortmund (71/228), Schalke (6/86)
45	(Germany) Jürgen Grabowski	109	441	0.25	1965	1980	Frankfurt
46	(Germany) Klaus Toppmöller	108	204	0.53	1973	1979	K'lautern
46	(Germany) Fredi Bobic	108	285	0.38	1994	2005	Stuttgart (69/148), Dortmund (17/56), Hannover (14/27), Hertha (8/54)
48	(Germany) Uwe Rahn	107	318	0.34	1980	1993	M’gladbach (81/227), Köln (13/43), Hertha (5/21), Düsseldorf (5/15), Frankfurt (3/12)
49	(Brazil) Aílton	106	219	0.48	1998	2007	Bremen (88/169), Schalke (14/29), Hamburg (3/13), Duisburg (1/8)
49	(Switzerland) Stéphane Chapuisat	106	228	0.46	1991	1999	Uerdingen (4/10), Dortmund (102/218)
49	(Germany) Christian Schreier	106	331	0.32	1981	1992	Bochum (35/98), Leverkusen (63/203), Düsseldorf (8/30)
52	(Germany) Bruno Labbadia	103	328	0.31	1987	2000	Hamburg (11/41), K'lautern (20/67), Bayern (28/82), Köln (15/41), Bremen (18/63), Bielefeld (11/34)
53	(England) **Harry Kane**	102	104	0.98	2023	2026	**Bayern**
53	(Germany) Timo Werner	102	260	0.39	2013	2025	Stuttgart (13/95), Leipzig (89/165)
55	(Germany) Marco Bode	101	379	0.27	1989	2002	Bremen
56	(Germany) **Serge Gnabry**	100	268	0.37	2016	2026	Bremen (11/27), Hoffenheim (10/22), **Bayern** (79/219)
56	(Germany) Thomas von Heesen	100	378	0.26	1980	1997	Hamburg (99/368), Bielefeld (1/10)
Minimum 100 goals

== Most Bundesliga goals by club ==
Current Bundesliga clubs and players who hold the club record are shown in bold.

As of matches played 22 November 2026.

Rank	Club	Player	Goals	Apps	Ratio	First	Last
1	**Bayern Munich**	(Germany) Gerd Müller	365	427	0.85	1965	1979
2	**Borussia Mönchengladbach**	(Germany) Jupp Heynckes	195	283	0.69	1965	1978
3	**Schalke 04**	(Germany) Klaus Fischer	182	295	0.62	1970	1981
4	**Bayer Leverkusen**	(Germany) Ulf Kirsten	181	350	0.52	1990	2003
5	**1. FC Köln**	(Germany) Hannes Löhr	166	381	0.44	1964	1977
6	**Eintracht Frankfurt**	(Germany) Bernd Hölzenbein	160	420	0.38	1967	1981
7	**TSG Hoffenheim**	(Croatia) **Andrej Kramarić**	141	330	0.43	2016	2026
8	**Hamburger SV**	(Germany) Uwe Seeler	137	239	0.57	1963	1972
9	**Borussia Dortmund**	(Germany) Manfred Burgsmüller	135	224	0.60	1976	1983
10	**VfB Stuttgart**	(Germany) Karl Allgöwer	129	338	0.38	1980	1991
11	**Werder Bremen**	(Peru) Claudio Pizarro	109	250	0.44	1999	2020
12	1. FC Kaiserslautern	(Germany) Klaus Toppmöller	108	204	0.53	1973	1979
13	**RB Leipzig**	(Germany) Timo Werner	89	165	0.54	2016	2025
14	Hertha BSC	(Germany) Michael Preetz	84	196	0.43	1997	2003
14	Eintracht Braunschweig	(Germany) Lothar Ulsaß	84	201	0.42	1964	1971
16	Rot-Weiss Essen	(Netherlands) Willi Lippens	79	172	0.46	1966	1976
17	1. FC Nürnberg	(Germany) Heinz Strehl	76	174	0.44	1963	1969
18	**SC Freiburg**	(Italy) **Vincenzo Grifo**	72	278	0.26	2019	2026
18	Hannover 96	(Germany) Hans Siemensmeyer	72	278	0.26	1965	1974
20	Fortuna Düsseldorf	(Germany) Klaus Allofs	71	169	0.42	1975	1981
20	MSV Duisburg	(Germany) Ronnie Worm	71	231	0.31	1972	1979
22	VfL Wolfsburg	(Bosnia and Herzegovina) Edin Džeko	66	111	0.59	2007	2010
22	1860 Munich	(Germany) Rudolf Brunnenmeier	66	119	0.55	1963	1968
24	VfL Bochum	(Germany) Hans-Joachim Abel	60	144	0.42	1977	1982
25	Bayer Uerdingen	(Germany) Friedhelm Funkel	59	254	0.23	1975	1989
26	Waldhof Mannheim	(Germany) Fritz Walter	55	129	0.43	1983	1987
27	Kickers Offenbach	(Germany) Erwin Kostedde	52	93	0.56	1972	1975
28	Arminia Bielefeld	(Poland) Artur Wichniarek	45	152	0.30	1999	2009
29	**FC Augsburg**	(Austria) **Michael Gregoritsch**	42	145	0.29	2017	2026
30	**Mainz 05**	(Germany) Jonathan Burkardt	41	136	0.30	2018	2025
31	Wuppertaler SV	(Germany) Günter Pröpper	39	87	0.45	1972	1975
31	Wattenscheid 09	(Senegal) Souleyman Sané	39	117	0.33	1990	1994
33	Karlsruher SC	(Germany) Emanuel Günther	37	126	0.29	1980	1985
34	Rot-Weiß Oberhausen	(Germany) Lothar Kobluhn	36	107	0.34	1969	1973
35	Hansa Rostock	(Sweden) Magnus Arvidsson	27	155	0.17	1999	2005
36	FC St. Pauli	(Germany) André Golke	25	98	0.26	1988	1991
Minimum 25 goals

== See also ==
- List of Bundesliga top scorers by season
- List of Bundesliga hat-tricks
- Bundesliga records and statistics
- Pichichi Trophy
- Premier League Golden Boot
- Capocannoniere
- List of Süper Lig top scorers
- List of Eredivisie top scorers
- List of Ukrainian Premier League top scorers
- List of Portugal Premier League top scorers
- List of Russian Premier League top scorers
- List of Ligue 1 top scorers
- List of top international association football goal scorers by country
