= Niedersachsenstadion =

Football stadium in Hanover, Germany

Coordinates: 52°21′36″N 9°43′52″E

Heinz-von-Heiden-Arena

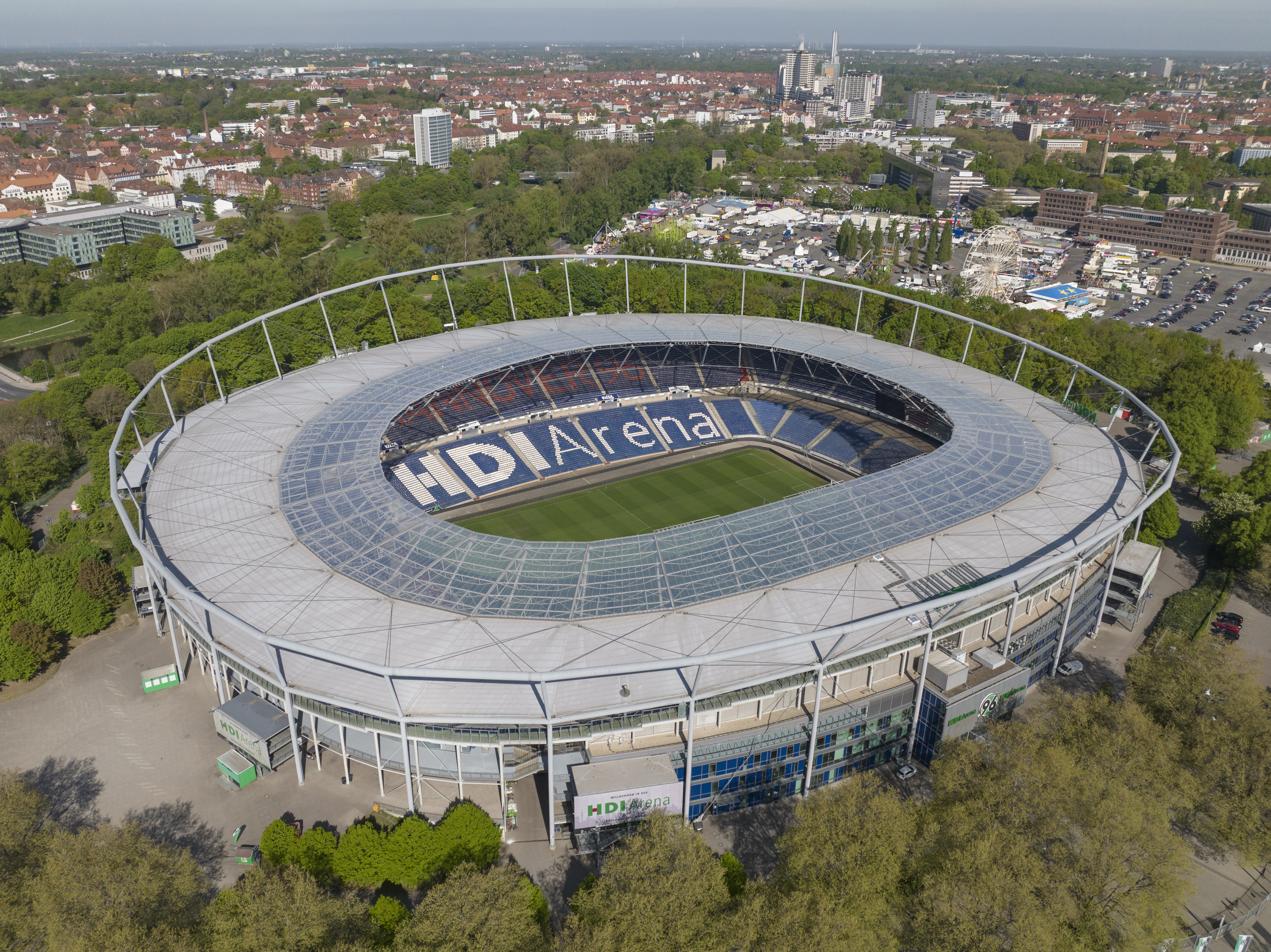
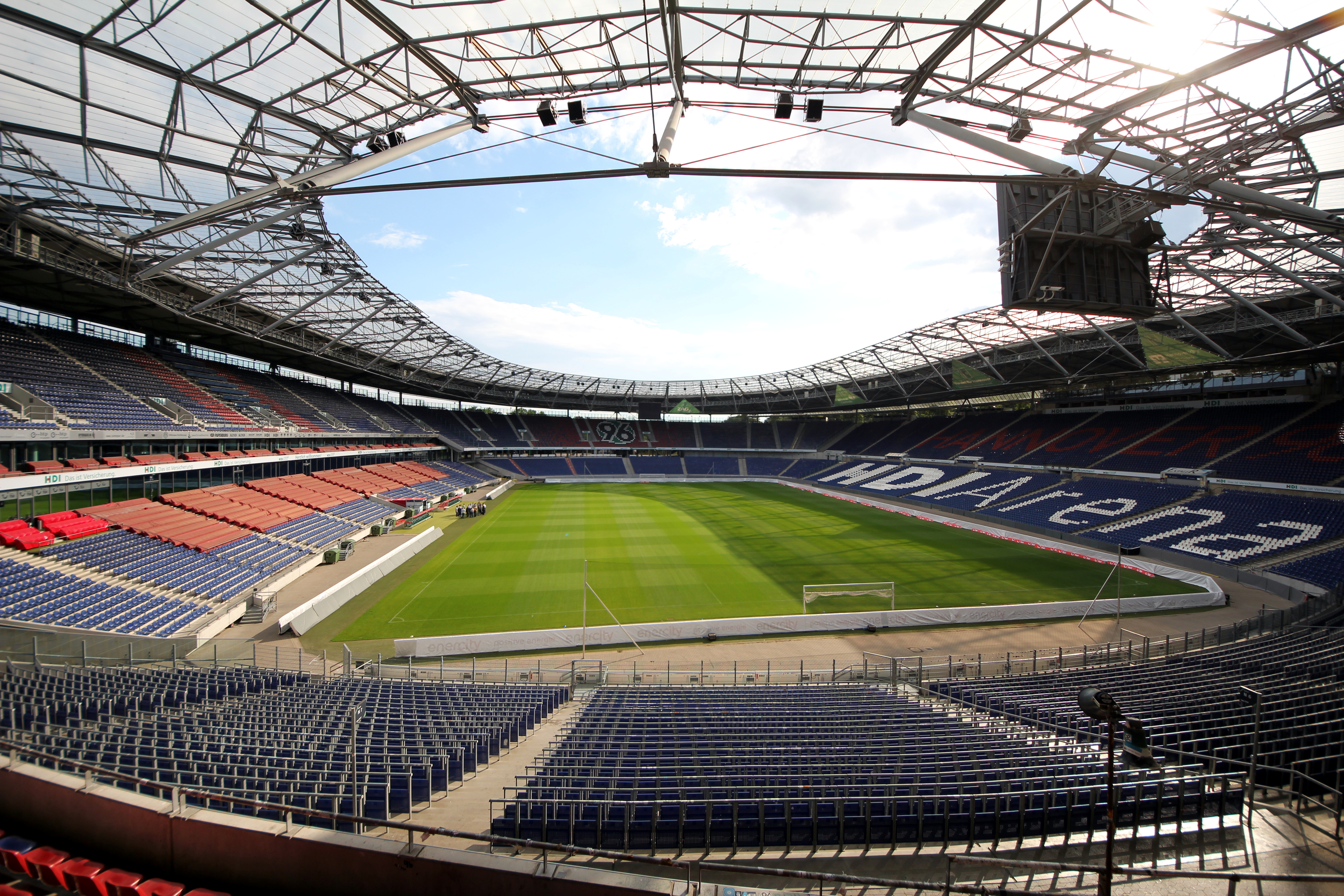
- Interactive map of Heinz-von-Heiden-Arena
- Former names: Niedersachsenstadion (1954–2002); AWD-Arena (2002–2013); HDI-Arena (2013–2022)
- Location: Hanover, Germany
- Operator: Hannover 96 Arena GmbH & Co. KG
- Capacity: 49,000
- Surface: Grass

Construction
- Opened: 26 September 1954
- Cost: € 82.8 million (for redevelopment)
- Architects: Schulitz & Partner Architects

Tenants
- Hannover 96 (1959–present); TSV Havelse (2021–2022); VfB Oldenburg (alternate venue, 2022–present); Germany national football team (selected matches)

Website
- https://www.heinzvonheiden-arena.de/

Niedersachsenstadion (German pronunciation: [ˈniːdɐzaksn̩ˌʃtaːdi̯ɔn], lit. 'Lower Saxony Stadium') is a football stadium in Hanover, Lower Saxony, Germany, which is home to 2. Bundesliga football club Hannover 96.

The original 86,000-capacity stadium was completed in 1954 and has since been rebuilt several times for various major football events. Today it has 49,000 covered seats. During the 2006 FIFA World Cup the stadium was named FIFA World Cup Stadium, Hanover.

Through a sponsorship deal, the stadium's official name is currently Heinz-von-Heiden-Arena [haɪnts fɔn ˈhaɪdn̩ʔaˌʁeːnaː]. Between 2002 and 2013 a similar arrangement saw the stadium renamed as the AWD-Arena [ˌʔaːveːˈdeːʔaˌʁeːnaː]; from 2013 to 2022 the stadium was named HDI-Arena [ˌhaːdeːˈʔiːʔaˌʁeːnaː].

== History ==
The stadium was built from 1952 to 1954, with an original capacity of 86,000. Huge amounts of debris from the houses in Hanover destroyed during World War II were used as the foundations of the stadium, with a total construction cost of 4 million Deutschmark. The stadium officially opened on 26 September 1954.

Hannover 96 moved permanently to the stadium from the Eilenriedestadion in 1959. Other local clubs, such as Arminia Hannover, OSV Hannover, TSV Havelse and Sportfreunde Ricklingen have also played matches there. In addition, the stadium has hosted numerous international matches, 4 (old) league championship games (in 1955, 1957, 1958 and 1961), 2 DFB-Supercup finals (in 1991 and 1992) and 8 DFB-Pokal finals (in 1962, 1963, 1965, 1970, 1972, 1975, 1977 and 1979).

From 2002 to 2013, the stadium carried the name of financial service provider AWD. From 2013 to 2022, it was named after insurance company HDI. Since 2022, the naming rights are held by construction company Heinz von Heiden.

On 17 November 2015, the stadium was due to host an international friendly between Germany and the Netherlands. However, the match was postponed two hours before kick off following reports of a "concrete security threat" and "intention to ignite explosives". The stadium and surrounding areas were evacuated, though no explosives were found.

TSV Havelse played in the stadium in the 2021–22 3. Liga since their regular home stadium, the Wilhelm-Langrehr-Stadion in Garbsen, did not meet 3. Liga requirements. Similarly, VfB Oldenburg will initially play their evening and winter home matches in the 2022–23 3. Liga at the stadium since their home stadium, the Marschweg-Stadion in Oldenburg, currently lacks floodlights and a heated pitch, and is bound to noise regulation ordinances for matches after 18:30. The club aims to fix these problems and move back to Oldenburg as soon as possible.

== International football tournaments ==
All times local (CEST)

=== 1974 FIFA World Cup ===
The stadium was one of the nine venues chosen for (West) Germany's first hosting of the World Cup. This event saw the number of seats increase to 38,000, which entailed a decrease in the overall capacity to 60,400. In addition, the upper rank of the west grandstand was completely roofed. These alterations cost 26million DM. Newly modified, the arena featured in both the first and second group phase.

The following games were played at the stadium during the World Cup of 1974:

Date	Time	Team	Result	Team	Round	Attendance
15 June 1974	16:00	Uruguay	0–2	Netherlands	Group 3	53,000
19 June 1974	19:30	Uruguay	1–1	Bulgaria	Group 3	12,000
26 June 1974	19:30	Brazil	1–0	East Germany	Group A (2nd round)	58,463
30 June 1974	16:00	Argentina	1–2	Brazil	Group A (2nd round)	38,000

=== 1988 European Championship ===
When Germany hosted its second international tournament, the stadium was again chosen as a venue. By now, due to the conversion of 8,000 terrace spots into single seating, the capacity stood at 55,000. It hosted two group matches:

Date	Time	Team	Result	Team	Round	Attendance
11 June 1988	15:30	Denmark	2–3	Spain	Group 1	60,366
15 June 1988	20:15	Republic of Ireland	1–1	Soviet Union	Group 2	38,308

=== 2006 FIFA World Cup ===
The stadium was one of the venues for the 2006 FIFA World Cup. However, due to FIFA sponsorship contracts, the arena was officially named FIFA World Cup Stadium Hanover (German: FIFA WM Stadion Hannover) during the World Cup. The stadium also had to convert its standing areas into seating, thus reducing the capacity for the tournament to 43,000, before being converted back after the games.

The following games were played at the stadium during the World Cup of 2006:

Date	Time	Team	Result	Team	Round	Attendance
12 June 2006	21:00	Italy	2–0	Ghana	Group E	43,000
16 June 2006	21:00	Mexico	0–0	Angola	Group D	43,000
20 June 2006	16:00	Costa Rica	1–2	Poland	Group A	43,000
23 June 2006	21:00	Switzerland	2–0	South Korea	Group G	43,000
27 June 2006	21:00	Spain	1–3	France	Round of 16	43,000

== Modern redevelopment ==
Although the stadium has seen many changes through the years, none were as extensive and impacting as the redevelopment of 2003–04 by Schulitz & Partner Architects, which cost €65 million.

For many years before, there had been much controversy within the club's fanbase over suggestions for building a new football arena. Eventually this led to the decision to preserve and comprehensively redevelop the existing stadium in 1997–98. When Germany was somewhat unexpectedly awarded the hosting of the 2006 FIFA World Cup, the major stadium work was finally put into action.

During 2003–04, major parts of the stadium were rebuilt; this reduced the maximum capacity to 49,951 (of which around 8,000 are standing spaces). Before 2003, the stadium had had high floodlight masts (referred to by locals as "toothbrushes"), track and field facilities inclusive and about 60% was open plan. The redevelopments transformed the stadium completely into a football arena, and removed about 70% of the previous building. The roof and about 25% of the area at the outer edges of the west grandstand were demolished, as were the north, south and east grandstands.

Instead of the previous scoreboards, the arena gained two modern video boards; and the old floodlight masts were replaced with 160 modern single headlights, which were integrated into the roof structure, supplying a light density of 1500 lux.

The pitch, under which a high performance drainage system and a cabin ground heating system was installed, was moved closer to the spectators than ever. With the removal of the track and field facilities, the pitch was moved directly to the west grandstand, and the remaining grandstands were then built around it. This necessitated the stands behind the goals to be designed so that the upward gradient gradually increases from west to east, creating a rather peculiar asymmetry, as the original west grandstand possessed such small angles of inclination and the new east grandstand was as constructed as steeply as possible.

The new inner roof was constructed using ETFE (ethylene tetrafluoroethylene) to allow sunlight through, thus allowing the grass the grow naturally, whilst also protecting all spectators from bad weather . This care for the pitch helps avoid the constant need to re-lay it, as in many other roofed stadiums, and was designed by Hanke Loköter who also helped with the construction of the Allianz Arena .

The new business and corporate packages of the AWD-Arena are comparable to the press area in the east grandstand. There are approximately 1,250 business seats, 29 VIP boxes for 10–12 people and 96 press places.

Work on the stadium finished ahead of schedule in December 2004. The first football match played following the redevelopment was on 23 January 2005, when Hannover 96 lost 3–0 to Bayer Leverkusen in the Bundesliga.

In June 2008, the stadium hosted the 2008 Hannover Sevens, the European Sevens championship in rugby union.

On 15 November 2009, the stadium was filled to capacity as the funeral site for 32-year-old Hannover 96 goalkeeper Robert Enke, who had died as a result of suicide on 10 November.

The stadium is one of few actual stadiums to be named in FIFA 12 when it was released on 28 September 2011.

== Other uses ==
Aside from football, the stadium was also the scene of several German athletics championships, the German Turnfest (a gymnastics festival), field handball finals, concerts, rugby and American football.

Since the performances of the Rolling Stones in 1982, the stadium has developed into the leading open-air concert venue in Northern Germany. After the stadium underwent extensive redevelopment in 2003–04, the open air tradition was revived again with a concert by the Rolling Stones in the new arena. Madonna performed at the stadium during her Confessions Tour in August 2006 for an audience of 40,000. Other performers who held a concert at the venue include Michael Jackson in 1988 as part of his Bad World Tour, Bon Jovi in 1996 for his These Days Tour, Status Quo in 2006 and U2 in 2010 during their U2 360° Tour with total 56,494 audience and Kasabian as support act.

Artists with more than two concerts at the venue
Artist	Dates	Tour	Notes
The Rolling Stones	6 & 7 June 1982	Tattoo You Tour	
The Rolling Stones	23 & 24 May 1990	Urban Jungle Tour	
The Rolling Stones	22 June 1995	Voodoo Lounge Tour	
The Rolling Stones	19 July 2006	A Bigger Bang Tour	
Phil Collins	17 & 18 July 1990	Seriously, Live! World Tour	
Phil Collins	3, 4, 6 & 7 September 1994	Both Sides of the World Tour	
Phil Collins	14 & 15 June 2019	Still Not Dead Yet Live!	
Genesis	7 June 1987	Invisible Touch Tour	
Genesis	10, 11 & 13 July 1992	We Can't Dance Tour	
Genesis	23 June 2007	Turn It On Again Tour	
Pink Floyd	25 June 1988	A Momentary Lapse of Reason Tour	
Pink Floyd	16 & 17 August 1994	The Division Bell Tour	
Tina Turner	4 June 1990	Foreign Affair Tour	
Tina Turner	29 May 1996	Wildest Dreams Tour	
Tina Turner	3 July 2000	Twenty Four Seven Tour	with John Fogerty as support act
Metallica	31 August 1991	Wherever We May Roam Tour	as part of Monsters of Rock 1991
Metallica	19 May 1993	Nowhere Else to Roam Tour	
AC/DC	31 August 1991	Razors Edge World Tour	as part of Monsters of Rock 1991
AC/DC	17 June 2001	Stiff Upper Lip World Tour	with Megadeth as support act
Coldplay	25 August 2009	Viva la Vida Tour	
Coldplay	22 September 2012	Mylo Xyloto Tour	with Charli XCX & Marina and the Diamonds as support acts
Coldplay	16 June 2017	A Head Full of Dreams Tour	
Herbert Grönemeyer	3 June 2007	12 Tour	
Herbert Grönemeyer	4 June 2011	Schiffsverkehr Tour	
Bruce Springsteen and the E Street Band	28 May 2013	Wrecking Ball Tour	
Bruce Springsteen and the E Street Band	5 July 2024	Springsteen and E Street Band 2023-25 Tour	
Robbie Williams	27 July 2013	Take the Crown Stadium Tour	with Olly Murs as support act
Robbie Williams	11 July 2017	The Heavy Entertainment Show Tour	with Erasure as support act
Robbie Williams	30 June 2025	Britpop Tour	with The Lottery Winners as support act
Linkin Park	16 June 2025	From Zero World Tour	
Scorpions	5 July 2025	60 Years of Scorpions tour	with Judas Priest, Alice Cooper, Bülent Ceylan and Rosy Vista as support acts
Post Malone	5 September 2025	Big Ass Stadium Tour	with Jelly Roll as support act
