= Wilhelm Sturm =

German footballer (1940–1996)

Personal information
- Date of birth: 8 February 1940
- Place of birth: Bochum, Germany
- Date of death: 5 November 1996 (aged 56)
- Height: 1.79 m (5 ft 10 in)
- Position: Midfielder

Senior career*
Years	Team	Apps	(Gls)
–1961	Union Günnigfeld		
1961–1971	Borussia Dortmund	239	(22)

International career
1964	West Germany	1	(0)
- * Club domestic league appearances and goals

Wilhelm 'Willi' Sturm (8 February 1940 – 5 November 1996) was a German football player. He spent 8 seasons in the Bundesliga with Borussia Dortmund. He represented West Germany once, in a friendly against Finland.

== Honours ==
Borussia Dortmund

- UEFA Cup Winners' Cup: 1966
- Oberliga 1962–63
- Bundesliga runner-up: 1965–66
- DFB-Pokal: 1965; finalist 1963
