= Bernhard Wessel =

German footballer (1936–2022)

Personal information
- Date of birth: 20 August 1936
- Place of birth: Sendenhorst, Westphalia, Prussia, Germany
- Date of death: 25 June 2022 (aged 85)
- Height: 1.75 m (5 ft 9 in)
- Position: Goalkeeper

Senior career*
Years	Team	Apps	(Gls)
1958–1959	TSG Rheda		
1959–1969	Borussia Dortmund	107	(0)

Managerial career
- 1968–1970: VfL Schwerte
- * Club domestic league appearances and goals

Bernhard Wessel (20 August 1936 – 25 June 2022) was a German footballer who played as a goalkeeper, most notably for Borussia Dortmund.

== Honours ==
Borussia Dortmund

- German football championship: 1963
- DFB-Pokal: 1965
- European Cup Winners' Cup: 1966
