= Independence Arena (Floriana) =

Sports venue in Floriana, Malta

Independence Ground
- Ix-Xagħra tal-Furjana
- Interactive map of Independence Ground
- Full name: Independence Arena
- Location: Floriana, Malta
- Coordinates: 35°53′40″N 14°30′19″E
- Owner: Government of Malta
- Operator: Floriana

Construction
- Opened: 1888

Independence Arena (also known as Ix-Xagħra tal-Furjana) was a multi-use stadium in Floriana, Malta. The stadium has fallen in a state of disrepair and is now used as a parking. The stadium was used mostly for football matches and was the home training pitch of Floriana. The stadium held 3,000 people.

== Background and description ==
=== History ===
When Malta was a crown colony of the United Kingdom, the Arena was mainly used for training purposes by the British Military in preparation of important ceremonies. The grandstand, which is still present to this say, was erected in anticipation of Malta's Independence celebrations. Indeed, on 21 September 1964 the Maltese flag was hosted for the first time at the stadium. This also explains why the stadium was named the Independence Arena and why it is held in fond regard by the Maltese public in general.

=== Future ===
Over the years, Floriana expressed their willingness to develop the stadium on more than one occasion. During a supporters rally held on 22 August 2024, Floriana unveiled plans for a new 4,000 all-seater football stadium.

== See also ==
- List of football stadiums in Malta
