= Lothar Kobluhn =

German footballer (1943–2019)

Personal information
- Date of birth: 12 April 1943
- Place of birth: Germany
- Date of death: 21 January 2019 (aged 75)
- Position: Midfielder

Senior career*
Years	Team	Apps	(Gls)
1963–1974	Rot-Weiß Oberhausen		
1974–1976	SG Wattenscheid 09		
- * Club domestic league appearances and goals

Lothar Kobluhn (12 April 1943 – 21 January 2019) was a German professional footballer who played as a midfielder. In the 1970–71 season, while playing for Rot-Weiß Oberhausen, he was the Bundesliga's top scorer, scoring 24 goals. Kobluhn had to wait 36 years for the top scorer trophy to be awarded because his club at the time, Rot-Weiß Oberhausen, was involved in the Bundesliga scandal. He finally received his award in 2007.

Kobluhn later played for SG Wattenscheid 09.

He died on 21 January 2019, aged 75. His elder brother Friedhelm Kobluhn was also a footballer.
