= Wolfgang Paul (footballer) =

German footballer (1940–2026)

Personal information
- Date of birth: 25 January 1940
- Place of birth: Olsberg, Germany
- Date of death: 28 June 2026 (aged 86)
- Place of death: Olsberg, Germany
- Height: 1.86 m (6 ft 1 in)
- Position: Libero

Youth career
- –1957: TuS Bigge 06

Senior career*
Years	Team	Apps	(Gls)
1957–1961	VfL Schwerte		
1961–1971	Borussia Dortmund	198	(7)
Medal record
Men's football
Representing West Germany
FIFA World Cup
Runner-up	1966 England
- * Club domestic league appearances and goals

Wolfgang Paul (German pronunciation: [ˈvɔlfɡaŋ ˈpaʊ̯l]; 25 January 1940 – 28 June 2026) was a German footballer who played as a libero.

Captaining Borussia Dortmund to the European Cup Winners Cup in 1966, Paul was included in Helmut Schön's West Germany squad for the 1966 FIFA World Cup. He never played a match for West Germany and had to retire early because of the effects an injury picked up in the late 1960s had to his game.

On 28 June 2026, Paul died from a "longstanding illness", at the age of 86.

== Honours ==
Borussia Dortmund

- UEFA Cup Winners' Cup: 1965–66
- Bundesliga runner-up: 1965–66
- DFB-Pokal: 1964–65; runner-up 1962–63

West Germany

- FIFA World Cup runner-up: 1966
