= Hans-Jürgen Kurrat =

German footballer

Personal information
- Date of birth: 7 July 1944 (age 82)
- Place of birth: Dortmund, Germany
- Height: 1.74 m (5 ft 9 in)
- Position: Striker

Senior career*
Years	Team	Apps	(Gls)
1963–1964	Borussia Dortmund	1	(1)
1964–1965	Rot-Weiss Essen		
1967–1968	Hammer SpVgg		
1968–1970	KSV Hessen Kassel		
1970–1972	DJK Gütersloh		
1973	Arminia Bielefeld		
1973–1974	SC Viktoria 04 Köln		
1974–1980	SpVgg Holzwickede		
- * Club domestic league appearances and goals

Hans-Jürgen Kurrat (born 7 July 1944 in Dortmund) is a retired German football striker.

His brother, Dieter, was also a former footballer.
