= Theodor Redder =

German footballer

Personal information
- Date of birth: 19 November 1941 (age 84)
- Place of birth: Werl, Germany
- Height: 1.78 m (5 ft 10 in)
- Position: Defender

Senior career*
Years	Team	Apps	(Gls)
- Preußen Werl
1962–1969	Borussia Dortmund	117	(2)

International career
1964	West Germany	1	(0)
- * Club domestic league appearances and goals

Theodor 'Theo' Redder (born 19 November 1941 in Werl) is a retired German football player. He spent six seasons in the Bundesliga with Borussia Dortmund. He represented West Germany in one friendly.

== Honours ==
- UEFA Cup Winners' Cup winner: 1965–66
- Oberliga winner 1962–63
- Bundesliga runner-up: 1965–66
- DFB-Pokal winner: 1964–65
- DFB-Pokal finalist: 1962–63
