= Reinhold Wosab =

German footballer (1938–2026)

Personal information
- Date of birth: 25 February 1938
- Place of birth: Marl, Gau Westphalia-North, Germany
- Date of death: 18 February 2026 (aged 87)
- Place of death: Bad Kreuznach, Rhineland-Palatinate, Germany
- Height: 1.76 m (5 ft 9 in)
- Positions: Striker; midfielder; defender

Senior career*
Years	Team	Apps	(Gls)
1958–1962	SpVgg Saxonia Marl		
1962–1971	Borussia Dortmund	227	(74)
1971–1973	VfL Bochum	59	(9)
1973–1975	Rot-Weiss Lüdenscheid		
1975–1979	SpVgg Marl		
- * Club domestic league appearances and goals

Reinhold Wosab (25 February 1938 – 18 February 2026) was a German professional footballer. He spent ten seasons in the Bundesliga with Borussia Dortmund and VfL Bochum.

== Career ==
Wosab scored 60 Bundesliga goals for Borussia Dortmund, in addition to 14 in 1962–63, the last season before a unified national league.

In 1965, Wosab scored a "ghost goal" against Karlsruher SC, when his shot hit the outside of the goalpost but went through a hole in the net.

In the 1965–66 Bundesliga season, Wosab scored both goals in an away win for Borussia Dortmund at Bayern Munich, the first meeting between the two teams. In total, he played four games and scored five goals against Bayern.

He was a member of the squad that won the 1966 European Cup Winners' Cup final.

ESPN recognised him in 2020 as one of the highest scoring defenders in the history of major European leagues.

== Later life and death ==
After the end of his career, Wosab served in the management of Borussia Dortmund. From 1987 to 2018, Wosab and his wife Doris ran the company "Goly-Pokale" in Alzey-Heimersheim. The company manufactures trophies and honorary awards made of cast metal, glass and acrylic, as well as medals, pins and engravings; the customers include German and international football awards.

Wosab died after a long illness on 18 February 2026, one week before his 88th birthday.

== Career statistics ==
Appearances and goals by club, season and competition
Club	Season	League			DFB-Pokal		DFB-Ligapokal		Europe		Other (Note: 1962–63 includes the West German football championships.)		Total	
Club	Season	Division	Apps	Goals	Apps	Goals	Apps	Goals	Apps	Goals	Apps	Goals	Apps	Goals
SpVgg Saxonia Marl	1958–59	Verbandsliga Westfalen			—		—		—		—			
SpVgg Saxonia Marl	1959–60	Verbandsliga Westfalen			—		—		—		—			
SpVgg Saxonia Marl	1960–61	Verbandsliga Westfalen			—		—		—		—			
SpVgg Saxonia Marl	1961–62	Verbandsliga Westfalen			—		—		—		—			
Borussia Dortmund	1962–63	Oberliga West	29	14	4	2	—		—		7	2	40	18
Borussia Dortmund	1963–64	Bundesliga	22	5	1	0	—		8	6	—		31	11
Borussia Dortmund	1964–65	Bundesliga	22	10	5	3	—		3	0	—		30	13
Borussia Dortmund	1965–66	Bundesliga	20	5	1	0	—		1	0	—		22	5
Borussia Dortmund	1966–67	Bundesliga	25	15	2	0	—		0	0	—		27	15
Borussia Dortmund	1967–68	Bundesliga	30	12	3	1	—		—		—		33	13
Borussia Dortmund	1968–69	Bundesliga	28	2	0	0	—		—		—		28	2
Borussia Dortmund	1969–70	Bundesliga	29	9	2	0	—		—		—		31	9
Borussia Dortmund	1970–71	Bundesliga	22	2	2	0	—		—		—		24	2
VfL Bochum	1971–72	Bundesliga	34	5	3	0	—		—		—		37	5
VfL Bochum	1972–73	Bundesliga	25	4	4	1	2	0	—		—		31	5
Rot-Weiss Lüdenscheid	1973–74	Regionalliga West	31	15	—		—		—		—		31	15
Rot-Weiss Lüdenscheid	1974–75	Verbandsliga Westfalen			2	1	—		—		—			
SpVgg Marl	1975–76	Bezirksliga			—		—		—		—			
SpVgg Marl	1976–77	Landesliga Westfalen			—		—		—		—			
SpVgg Marl	1977–78	Landesliga Westfalen			—		—		—		—			
SpVgg Marl	1978–79	Verbandsliga Westfalen			—		—		—		—			
Career total					29	8	2	0	12	6	7	2		

== Honours ==
Borussia Dortmund

- UEFA Cup Winners' Cup: 1965–66
- West German football championship: 1963
- Bundesliga runner-up: 1965–66
- DFB-Pokal: 1964–65; finalist 1962–63
