= Jürgen Schütz =

German footballer

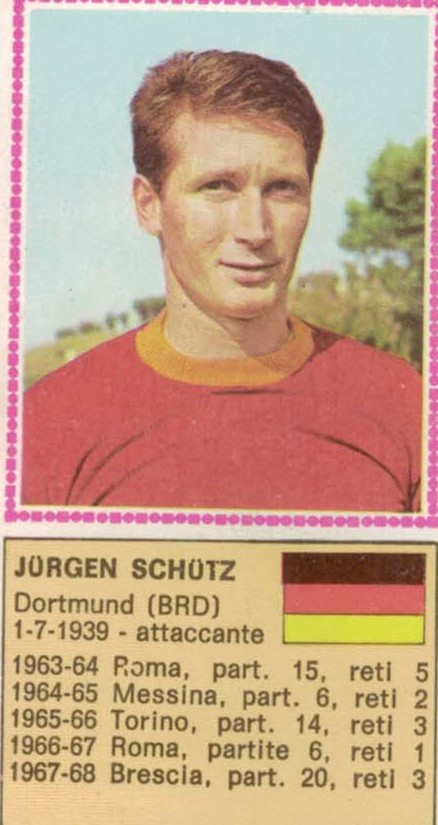

Personal information
- Date of birth: 1 July 1939
- Place of birth: Dortmund, Germany
- Date of death: 19 March 1995 (aged 55)
- Height: 1.78 m (5 ft 10 in)
- Position: Midfielder

Senior career*
Years	Team	Apps	(Gls)
1959–1963	Borussia Dortmund	114	(98)
1963–1964	Roma	15	(5)
1964–1965	Messina	6	(2)
1965–1966	Torino	14	(3)
1966–1967	Roma	6	(1)
1967–1968	Brescia	20	(3)
1968–1969	1860 Munich	20	(6)
1969–1972	Borussia Dortmund	73	(26)
1972–1974	Rot-Weiss Lüdenscheid		

International career
1960–1963	Germany	6	(2)
- * Club domestic league appearances and goals

Jürgen Schütz (1 July 1939 – 19 March 1995) was a German professional footballer who played as a midfielder. He spent four seasons in the Bundesliga with 1860 Munich and Borussia Dortmund. Schütz also represented Germany in six friendlies. He died of laryngeal cancer.

== Honours ==
Borussia Dortmund

- Bundesliga: 1963
- DFB-Pokal runner-up: 1963
