= Friedhelm Konietzka =

German football player and manager (1938–2012)

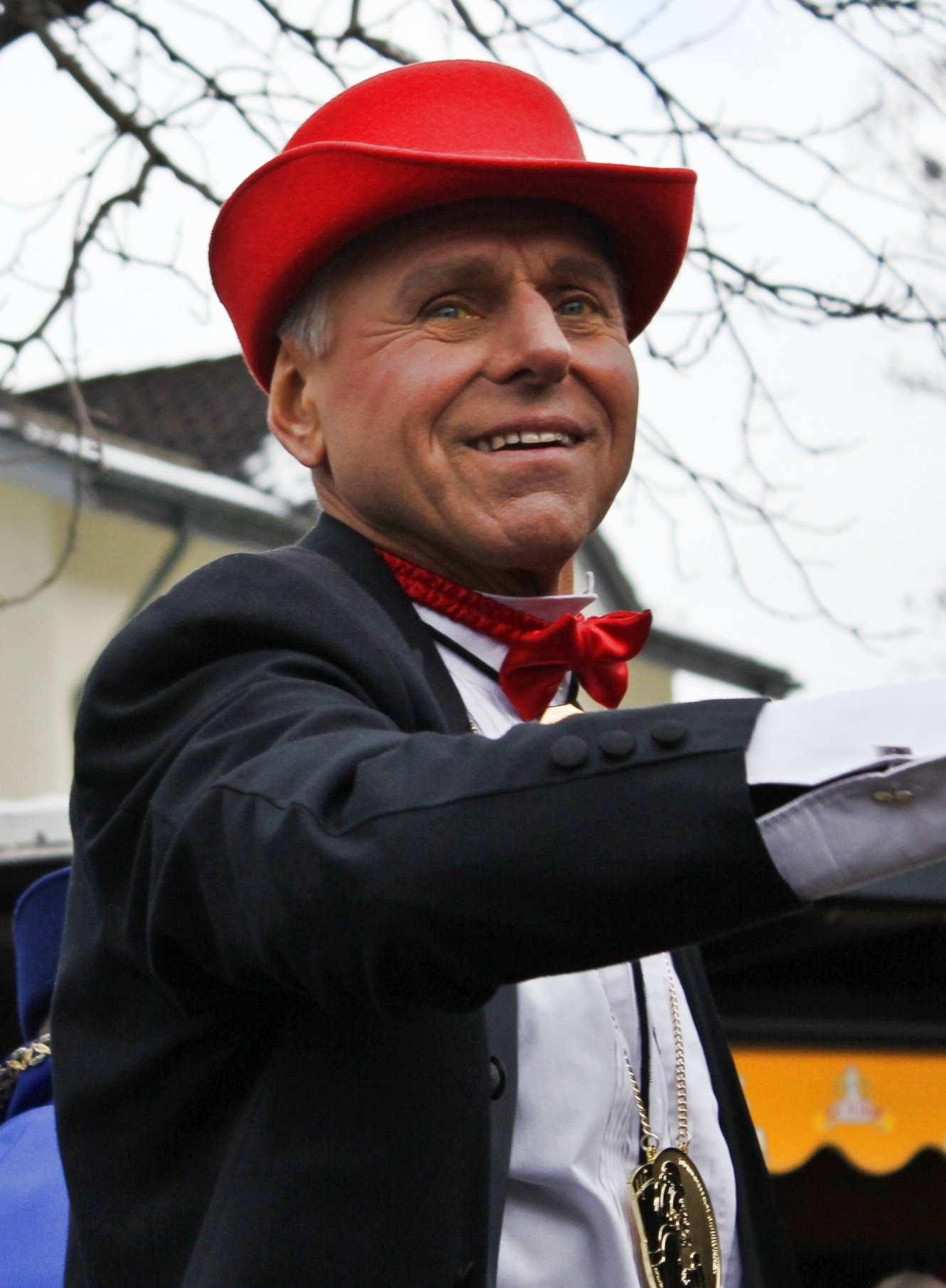
- Friedhelm Konietzka in 2012

Personal information
- Full name: Friedhelm Konietzka
- Date of birth: 2 August 1938
- Place of birth: Lünen, Germany
- Date of death: 12 March 2012 (aged 73)
- Place of death: Brunnen, Switzerland
- Height: 1.77 m (5 ft 10 in)
- Position: Striker

Youth career
- –1958: VfB 08 Lünen

Senior career*
Years	Team	Apps	(Gls)
1958–1965	Borussia Dortmund	163	(121)
1965–1967	1860 Munich	47	(30)
1967–1971	FC Winterthur		

International career
1962–1965	West Germany	9	(3)

Managerial career
- 1971–1978: FC Zürich
- 1978–1980: Young Boys
- 1980–1982: Grasshoppers
- 1982–1983: Hessen Kassel
- 1983–1984: Bayer Uerdingen
- 1984: Borussia Dortmund
- 1985–1986: Grasshoppers
- 1987–1988: FC Zürich
- 1990–1991: Bayer Uerdingen
- 1993–1994: FC Luzern
- * Club domestic league appearances and goals

Friedhelm "Timo" Konietzka (2 August 1938 – 12 March 2012) was a German professional football player and manager who played as a striker. He earned his nickname "Timo" due to a supposed resemblance to the Soviet commander Semyon Timoshenko.

== Biography ==
Konietzka was born in Lünen, Province of Westphalia, and started his football career at his hometown club VfB 08 Lünen. In his youth (for five years since the age of 14) he worked in a coal mine. Max Merkel, coach of Borussia Dortmund at that time, discovered his talent when Konietzka was 20 and included him in the Dortmund squad. Together with fellow striker Jürgen Schütz, he formed the most dangerous attack of the Oberliga West. Konietzka played a total of 100 Bundesliga matches for Borussia Dortmund and TSV 1860 Munich and scored 72 goals, being the second best scorer of the league from 1964 to 1966 in the process. He was also capped nine times (three goals) for Germany between 1962 and 1965. Despite Konietzka's fine goalscoring record in the German league, Germany national team manager Sepp Herberger thought of him as too inconsistent, which could be one of the reasons Konietzka never featured regularly for the national side.

He won the German championship with Dortmund against 1. FC Köln in the last final before the introduction of the Bundesliga in 1963.

Konietzka earned his place in football history books when he scored the very first goal of the newly founded Bundesliga in the first minute of a match between Werder Bremen and Borussia Dortmund on 24 August 1963 (at 16:59 German time, as the game had started slightly earlier than scheduled). His biggest successes as a player were a DFB-Pokal title with Dortmund in 1965 and championship titles with Dortmund in 1963 and TSV 1860 Munich in 1966.

His coaching career included stints with Borussia Dortmund, Bayer Uerdingen, FC Zürich, BSC Young Boys and Grasshopper Club Zürich. He won three Swiss championships with FC Zürich between 1974 and 1976 and reached the semi-final of the 1976–77 European Cup, where his Zürich side was knocked out by English champions Liverpool. As coach of BSC Young Boys he twice reached the final of the Swiss Cup between 1978 and 1980.

Konietzka's wife is named Claudia. He took Swiss citizenship in 1988. With help of euthanasia-organisation Exit International, he chose to end his life at the age of 73 in Brunnen, Canton of Schwyz. He had been suffering from cancer prior to his death on 12 March 2012.

== Honours ==
=== Player ===
Borussia Dortmund

- West German champions: 1963
- DFB-Pokal: 1964–65

1860 Munich

- Bundesliga: 1965–66

=== Manager ===
FC Zürich

- Nationalliga A: 1973–74, 1974–75, 1975–76

Grasshoppers

- Nationalliga A: 1981–82
