= Gerhard Cyliax =

German footballer

Personal information
- Date of birth: 23 August 1934
- Place of birth: Dortmund, Germany
- Date of death: 17 May 2008 (aged 73)
- Position: Defender

Senior career*
Years	Team	Apps	(Gls)
1955–1957	Westfalia Herne		
1957–1959	SC Preußen Münster		
1959–1968	Borussia Dortmund	177	(22)
- * Club domestic league appearances and goals

Gerhard Cyliax (23 August 1934 – 17 May 2008) was a German footballer who played as a defender for Borussia Dortmund.

== Honours ==
=== Club ===
Borussia Dortmund

- German football championship: 1963
- DFB-Pokal: 1964–65
- European Cup Winners' Cup: 1965–66
