= Lothar Emmerich =

German footballer (1941–2003)

- Emmerich for Borussia Dortmund in 1966

Personal information
- Date of birth: 29 November 1941
- Place of birth: Dorstfeld, Germany
- Date of death: 13 August 2003 (aged 61)
- Place of death: Hemer, Germany
- Height: 1.78 m (5 ft 10 in)
- Positions: Forward; winger

Senior career*
Years	Team	Apps	(Gls)
1960–1969	Borussia Dortmund	215	(126)
1969–1972	K Beerschot VAV	68	(42)
1972–1974	Austria Klagenfurt	58	(41)
1974–1976	1. FC Schweinfurt 05	64	(37)
1976–1977	Würzburger FV	42	(25)
1978	Kickers Würzburg	25	(9)
Total		472	(280)

International career
1966	West Germany	5	(2)

Managerial career
- 1981–1982: SpVgg Bayreuth
- 1983–1984: Mainz 05
- 1986: SSV Reutlingen
- 1986–1987: Eintracht Bad Kreuznach
- 1988–1990: KSV Klein-Karben
- 1992–1996: SC Idar-Oberstein
- 1996–1997: SG Weinsheim
- 1997–1999: TuS Kirchweiler
Medal record
Men's football
Representing West Germany
FIFA World Cup
Runner-up	1966 England
- * Club domestic league appearances and goals

Lothar "Emma" Emmerich (29 November 1941 – 13 August 2003) was a German football player and manager who played as a forward. He was born in Dortmund-Dorstfeld and died in Hemer from cancer.

He won five caps for West Germany in 1966, four of which were during that year's World Cup.

Emmerich scored 115 goals in only 183 Bundesliga matches.

== Career statistics ==
=== Club ===
Appearances and goals by club, season and competition
Club	Season	League			Cup		Europe		Total	
Club	Season	Division	Apps	Goals	Apps	Goals	Apps	Goals	Apps	Goals
Borussia Dortmund	1960–61	Oberliga	17	7	—		—		17	7
Borussia Dortmund	1961–62	Oberliga	11	4	—		—		11	4
Borussia Dortmund	1962–63	Oberliga	4	0	—		—		4	0
Borussia Dortmund	1963–64	Bundesliga	29	16	1	0	7 (Note: Appearances in European Cup)	1	37	17
Borussia Dortmund	1964–65	Bundesliga	26	10	5	4	3 (Note: Appearances in Inter-Cities Fairs Cup)	0	34	14
Borussia Dortmund	1965–66	Bundesliga	34	31	1	0	9 (Note: Appearances in European Cup Winners' Cup)	14	44	45
Borussia Dortmund	1966–67	Bundesliga	34	28	2	2	2	0	38	30
Borussia Dortmund	1967–68	Bundesliga	27	18	3	1	—		30	19
Borussia Dortmund	1968–69	Bundesliga	33	12	1	0	—		34	12
Borussia Dortmund	Total		215	126	13	7	21	15	249	148
K. Beerschot VAV	1969–70	Belgian First Division	30	29			—		30	29
K. Beerschot VAV	1970–71	Belgian First Division	26	5			—		26	5
K. Beerschot VAV	1971–72	Belgian First Division	12	7			—		12	7
K. Beerschot VAV	Total		68	41			—		68	41
Austria Klagenfurt	1972–73	Austrian National Liga	29	20			—		29	20
Austria Klagenfurt	1973–74	Austrian National Liga	29	21			—		29	21
Austria Klagenfurt	Total		58	41			—		58	41
1. FC Schweinfurt 05	1974–75	2. Bundesliga	30	16	1	2	—		31	18
1. FC Schweinfurt 05	1975–76	2. Bundesliga	34	21	1	0	—		35	21
1. FC Schweinfurt 05	Total		64	37	2	2	—		66	39
Würzburger FV	1976–77	2. Bundesliga	37	24	0	0	—		37	24
Würzburger FV	1977–78	2. Bundesliga	5	1	2	0	—		7	1
Würzburger FV	Total		42	25	2	0	—		44	25
Würzburger Kickers	1977–78	2. Bundesliga	25	9	0	0	—		25	9
Career total			472	279	17	9	21	15	510	303

=== International ===
Appearances and goals by national team and year
National team	Year	Apps	Goals
West Germany	1966	6	2
Total		6	2

== Honours ==
Borussia Dortmund

- German football championship: 1963
- DFB-Pokal: 1964–65
- European Cup Winners' Cup: 1965–66

Germany

- FIFA World Cup Runner-up: 1966

Individual

- Bundesliga top scorer: 1965–66, 1966–67
- Belgian First Division top goalscorer: 1969–70
