= Dieter Kurrat =

German footballer and coach

Personal information
- Date of birth: 15 May 1942
- Place of birth: Dortmund, Germany
- Date of death: 27 October 2017 (aged 75)
- Place of death: Holzwickede, Germany
- Height: 1.62 m (5 ft 4 in)
- Positions: Midfielder; defender

Youth career
- FC Merkur
- Borussia Dortmund

Senior career*
| Years | Team | Apps | (Gls) |
| 1960–1974 | Borussia Dortmund | 309 | (17) |
| 1974–1976 | SV Holzwickede | | |

International career
| 1960 | West Germany U18 | 6 | (0) |
| 1965 | West Germany U23 | 1 | (0) |

Managerial career
- 1973: Borussia Dortmund
- 1974–1976: SV Holzwickede
- * Club domestic league appearances and goals

Dieter 'Hoppi' Kurrat (15 May 1942 – 27 October 2017) was a German football player and coach. His brother, Hans-Jürgen Kurrat, also played football professionally.

== Career ==
As a player, he spent nine seasons in the Bundesliga (a German professional association football league) with Borussia Dortmund. Nicknamed "Hoppy", he became a club legend, winning the German Championship, the DFB Cup, in 1965 and the European Cup Winner's Cup in 1966.

== Death ==
Kurrat died on 27 October 2017.

== Honours ==
- UEFA Cup Winners' Cup winner: 1965–66
- Bundesliga runner-up: 1965–66
- DFB-Pokal winner: 1964–65; finalist 1962–63
