= 1964–65 DFB-Pokal =

Tournament details
- Country: West Germany
- Teams: 32

Final positions
- Champions: Borussia Dortmund
- Runners-up: Alemannia Aachen

Tournament statistics
- Matches played: 32

The 1964–65 DFB-Pokal was the 22nd season of the annual German football cup competition. It began on 16 January 1965 and ended on 22 May 1965. 32 teams competed in the tournament of five rounds. In the final Borussia Dortmund defeated Alemannia Aachen 2–0.

== Matches ==
=== First round ===
16 January 1965
1. FC Nürnberg	2 – 0	1. FC Köln
Rot-Weiß Oberhausen	5 – 0	TSG Ulm 1846
1. FC Kaiserslautern	3 – 0	Karlsruher SC
Westfalia Herne	3 – 4	Tennis Borussia Berlin	(AET)
VfR Frankenthal	0 – 5	VfB Stuttgart
Altonaer FC 93	0 – 5	Hannover 96
Hertha BSC	1 – 5	Eintracht Braunschweig
VfL Wolfsburg	3 – 4	TSV 1860 München
Preußen Münster	0 – 1	Borussia Dortmund
VfL Osnabrück	1 – 3	Alemannia Aachen
1. FSV Mainz 05	1 – 0	SV Werder Bremen
KSV Hessen Kassel	0 – 2	Hamburger SV
SuS Northeim	0 – 1	Meidericher SV	(AET)
TSV Schwaben Augsburg	5 – 7	FC Schalke 04	(AET)
Eintracht Frankfurt	2 – 1	Borussia Neunkirchen
Kickers Offenbach	2 – 4	VfR Wormatia Worms

=== Round of 16 ===
6 February 1965
Eintracht Frankfurt	1 – 2	FC Schalke 04
1. FSV Mainz 05	2 – 2	TSV 1860 München	(AET)
VfR Wormatia Worms	0 – 2	VfB Stuttgart
1. FC Nürnberg	3 – 1	Hamburger SV
1. FC Kaiserslautern	1 – 3	Hannover 96
Meidericher SV	0 – 1	Eintracht Braunschweig
Tennis Borussia Berlin	1 – 2	Borussia Dortmund
Rot-Weiß Oberhausen	0 – 1	Alemannia Aachen

==== Replay ====
17 February 1965
TSV 1860 München	1 – 2	1. FSV Mainz 05

=== Quarter-finals ===
27 February 1965
Eintracht Braunschweig	0 – 2	Borussia Dortmund
FC Schalke 04	4 – 2	VfB Stuttgart
Alemannia Aachen	2 – 1	Hannover 96
1. FSV Mainz 05	0 – 3	1. FC Nürnberg

=== Semi-finals ===
17 April 1965

Borussia Dortmund	4 – 2	1. FC Nürnberg
Emmerich 2'; Konietzka 7', 75'; Wosab 72'		Greif 54'; Wild 65'

Rote Erde, Dortmund
Attendance: 31,500
Referee: Schulenburg (Hamburg)

17 April 1965

Alemannia Aachen	4 – 3 (a.e.t.)	FC Schalke 04
Breuer 28', 100'; Nacken 60'; Martinelli 66'		Gerhardt 27'; Koslowski 47'; Bechmann 52'

Old Tivoli, Aachen
Attendance: 32,000
Referee: Sparing (Kassel)

=== Final ===
22 May 1965
16:00 CET

Borussia Dortmund	2–0	Alemannia Aachen
Schmidt 10'; Emmerich 18'	Report

Niedersachsenstadion, Hanover
Attendance: 55,000
Referee: Rudibert Jacobi (Heidelberg)
