= Aki Schmidt =

German footballer and manager (1935–2016)

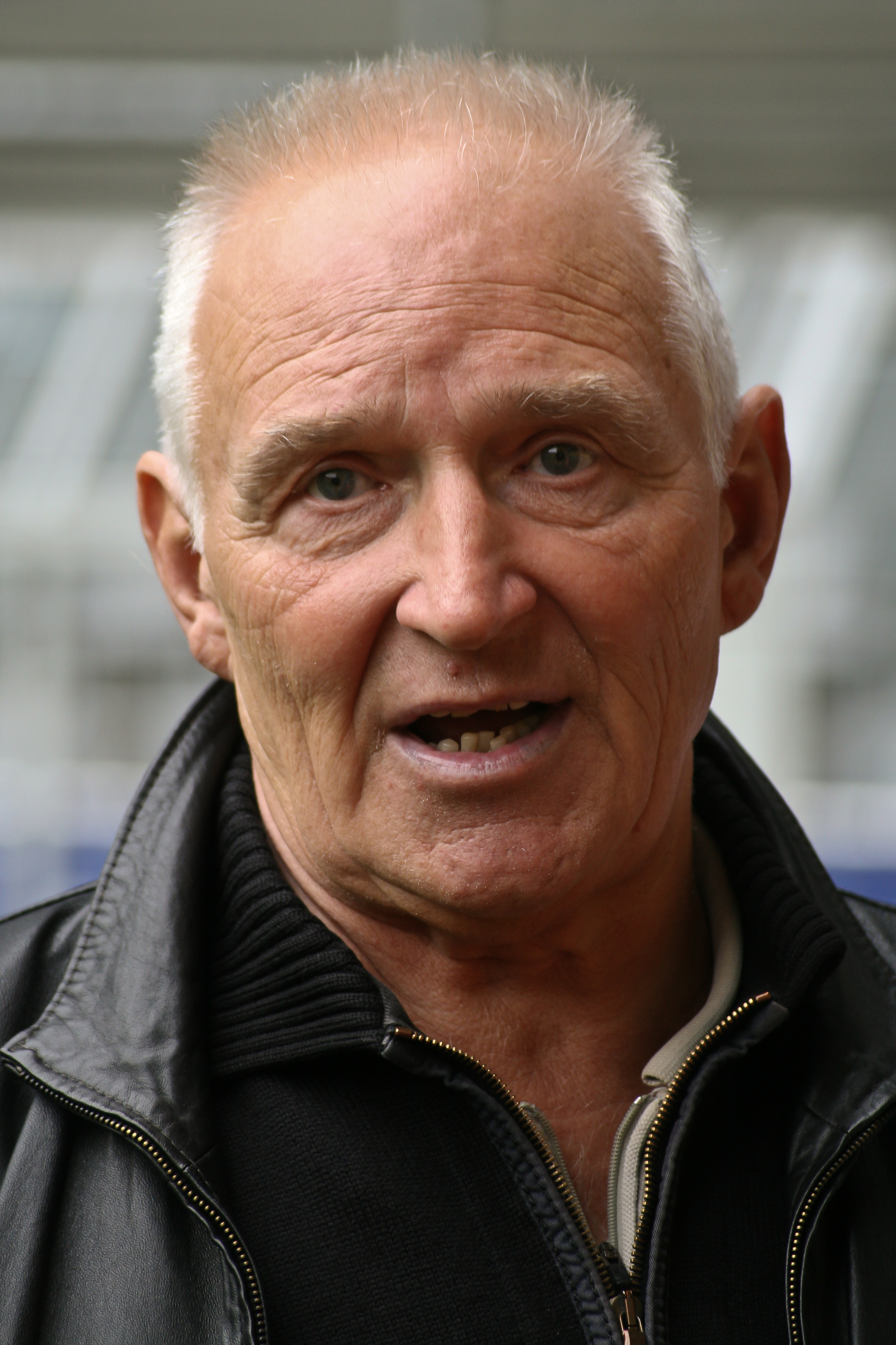
- Aki Schmidt in 2005

Personal information
- Full name: Alfred Schmidt
- Date of birth: 5 September 1935
- Place of birth: Dortmund, Germany
- Date of death: 11 November 2016 (aged 81)
- Place of death: Dortmund, Germany
- Position: Midfielder

Senior career*
Years	Team	Apps	(Gls)
1956–1968	Borussia Dortmund	163	(67)

International career
1957–1964	West Germany	25	(8)

Managerial career
- 1968–1970: SSV Jahn Regensburg
- 1970–1971: Kickers Offenbach
- 1971–1972: Preußen Münster
- 1972–1974: FK Pirmasens
- 1975–1976: SSV Jahn Regensburg
- * Club domestic league appearances and goals

Alfred "Aki" Schmidt (5 September 1935 – 11 November 2016) was a German football player and manager.

Schmidt played as attacking midfielder for Borussia Dortmund from 1956 to 1968, winning the German Cup in 1965 and the UEFA Cup Winners' Cup in 1966. In total, he played for Dortmund 276 times, scoring 67 times.

He played for the Germany national football team 25 times between 1957 and 1964 and was a member of the team that finished fourth at the 1958 FIFA World Cup in Sweden.

Schmit was manager of Kickers Offenbach between 1970 and 1971, winning the DFB-Pokal in 1970.

Until his death, he served as the fan correspondent of Borussia Dortmund.

== Honours ==
=== Club ===
Borussia Dortmund

- German football championship: 1957, 1963
- DFB-Pokal: 1964–65
- European Cup Winners' Cup: 1965–66

=== Managerial ===
Kickers Offenbach

- DFB-Pokal: 1969–70
