= 1992 in association football =

The following are some of the association football events of the year 1992 throughout the world.

== Events ==
- 5 May – A provisional tribune crashes in the Stade Armand Cesari in Bastia, Corsica during the semi-final of the Coupe de France between Bastia SC and Olympique de Marseille. Eighteen people die, while 2.300 fans get injured.
- 9 May – Liverpool wins 2–0 over Sunderland to claim the FA Cup.
- 17 June – The Copa Libertadores is won by São Paulo FC after the defeat of Newell's Old Boys 3–2 via a penalty shootout after a final aggregate score of 1–1.
- 26 June – In Euro 1992, Denmark surprisingly won 2–0 over Germany at Nya Ullevi, Gothenburg, Sweden.
- 30 June – Due to financial problems Dutch club FC Wageningen is disestablished, after having played its last match one month earlier against NAC Breda in the Eerste Divisie.
- France wins the right to host for a second time the Football World Cup in the year 1998: Football World Cup 1998
- 10 July – The Major Indoor Soccer League ceases operation after 14 seasons in the United States.
- 9 September – Dick Advocaat makes his debut as the manager of Dutch national team, as the successor of Rinus Michels, with a 2–3 friendly defeat against Italy in Eindhoven.
- 14 October – Marco van Basten makes his last appearance for the Dutch national team, earning his 58th cap against Poland. Gerald Vanenburg (42nd) and Berry van Aerle (35th) also play their last match for the Dutch, while Arthur Numan makes his debut in the World Cup qualifier in De Kuip, Rotterdam.
- 12 December – São Paulo FC wins the Intercontinental Cup in Tokyo, Japan by defeating Spain's FC Barcelona (1–2). Raí scores twice for the Brazilians.

== Winner club national championships ==
=== Africa ===
- Egypt – Zamalek

=== Asia ===
- Qatar – Al-Ittihad
- South Korea – POSCO Atoms

=== Europe ===
- Denmark – Lyngby BK
- England - Leeds United
- France - Olympique de Marseille
- Germany – VfB Stuttgart
- Italy – A.C. Milan
- Netherlands – PSV Eindhoven
- Portugal – FC Porto
- Republic of Ireland – Shelbourne
- Scotland – Rangers
- Spain – FC Barcelona
- Sweden – AIK
- Turkey – Beşiktaş

=== North America ===
- Canada – Winnipeg Fury (CSL)
- Mexico – León
- United States
  - APSL – Colorado Foxes
  - Professional Cup – Colorado Foxes

=== South America ===
- Argentina
  - Clausura – Newell's Old Boys
  - Apertura – Club Atlético Boca Juniors
- Bolivia – Bolívar
- Brazil – Flamengo
- Ecuador – El Nacional
- Paraguay – Cerro Porteño

== International tournaments ==
- African Cup of Nations in Senegal ( 12–26 January 1992)
  1. Ivory Coast
  2. Ghana
  3. Nigeria
- UEFA European Football Championship in Sweden ( 10–26 June 1992)
  1. Denmark
  2. Germany
  3. —
- Baltic Cup in Liepāja, Latvia ( 10–12 July 1992)
  1. Lithuania
  2. Latvia
  3. Estonia
- Olympic Games in Barcelona, Spain (24 July – 8 August 1992)
  1. Spain
  2. Poland
  3. Ghana

== Births ==
- 1 January
  - Daniel Kofi Agyei, Ghanaian footballer
  - Michael Tambak, Dutch footballer
  - Jack Wilshere, English footballer
- 6 January
  - Nika Dzalamidze, Georgian international footballer
  - Kita, Brazilian international footballer (died 2015)
- 7 January: Eric Reverter, Spanish footballer
- 8 January: Apostolos Vellios, Greek international footballer
- 9 January: Edon Hasani, Albanian youth international
- 10 January: Christian Atsu, Ghanaian footballer (died 2023)
- 11 January: Nick Harel, Mauritian international footballer
- 13 January: Santiago Arias, Colombian international footballer
- 18 January: Obinna Nwachukwu, Nigerian international footballer
- 20 January: Jorge Zárate, Mexican club footballer
- 22 January: Vincent Aboubakar, Cameroonian international footballer
- 23 January: Oliver Mohr, Austrian footballer
- 28 January: Valeri Sarmont, Russian footballer
- 30 January: Darvin Watson, Caymanian footballer
- 2 February: Kevin Feiersinger, German footballer
- 7 February: Sergi Roberto, Spanish international
- 11 February: Mfundo Nsele, South African footballer
- 18 February: Mahatma Gandhi, Brazilian footballer
- 19 February: Niels Vets, Belgian footballer
- 20 February: Jaime Turégano, Spanish footballer
- 21 February: Phil Jones, English international
- 23 February:
  - Terry Hawkridge, English club footballer
  - John Steven Rivera, Colombian footballer
- 29 February
  - Francesco Gazo, Italian footballer
  - Jawad El Yamiq, Moroccan footballer
  - Guido Herrera, Argentinian footballer
  - Perry Kitchen, American soccer player
  - Saphir Taïder, French-Algerian footballer
- 2 March: Malte Grashoff, German footballer
- 4 March:
  - Erik Lamela, Argentine footballer
  - Bernd Leno, German footballer
- 10 March: Adrien Ménager, French footballer
- 17 March: Nkosinathi Ogle, South African footballer
- 20 March: Matias Caseras, Uruguayan footballer
- 27 March: Pedro Obiang, Spanish-Equatoguinean footballer
- 28 March: Sergi Gómez, Spanish footballer
- 10 April: Sadio Mané, Senegalese footballer
- 14 April: Frederik Sørensen, Danish footballer
- 15 April: John Guidetti, Swedish footballer
- 17 April: Shkodran Mustafi, German footballer
- 20 April:
  - Kristian Álvarez, Mexican footballer
  - Marko Meerits, Estonian footballer
- 30 April:
  - Aljoscha Hyde, German-Ghanaian footballer
  - Marc-André ter Stegen, German footballer
- 1 May: Matěj Vydra, Czech footballer
- 3 May: Hervenogi Unzola, German footballer
- 17 May: Amro Tarek, Egyptian footballer
- 18 May: Brian Idowu, Nigerian footballer
- 20 May: Gerónimo Rulli, Argentine footballer
- 22 May: Syaiful Indra Cahya, Indonesian footballer
- 27 May: Jeison Murillo, Colombian footballer
- 31 May: Jil Ludwig, German footballer
- 9 June: Leonardo, Brazilian footballer
- 15 June: Mohamed Salah, Egyptian footballer
- 28 June: Oscar Hiljemark, Swedish footballer
- 4 July
  - Ángel Romero, Paraguayan footballer
  - Óscar Romero, Paraguayan footballer
- 5 July: Alberto Moreno, Spanish footballer
- 6 July: Seedy Bah, Gambian footballer
- 7 July: Sebastian Doro, German footballer
- 9 July: Jil Strüngmann, German footballer
- 17 July: Denis Prychynenko, Ukrainian-German footballer
- 22 July: Mama Bah-Yéré, Beninese international footballer
- 23 July: Danny Ings, English footballer
- 24 July:
  - Dionatan Teixeira, Brazilian-born Slovak footballer (d. 2017)
  - Vando (Vando Jorge Lopes Da Costa Neto), São Toméan footballer
- 28 July: Gabriel Viana, Portuguese footballer
- 29 July: Djibril Sidibé, French international
- 2 August: Lionel Essono, Cameroonian footballer
- 7 August: Wout Weghorst, Dutch international footballer
- 10 August: Naguib Chakouri, French footballer
- 12 August: Mark Engberink, Dutch footballer
- 15 August: João Paulo, Portuguese footballer
- 16 August: Amian Clement, Ivorian footballer
- 18 August: Chris N'Goyos, French footballer
- 20 August:
  - Andrei Peteleu, Romanian junior international
  - Deniss Rakels, Latvian international
- 2 September: Emiliano Martínez, Argentine international footballer
- 9 September: Ibrahim Olanrewaju, Nigerian footballer
- 13 September: Johan Svantesson, Swedish footballer
- 15 September: Akil Grier, England-born footballer
- 17 September: Stuart Bannigan, Scottish footballer
- 19 September: Samet Hasan Yıldıran, Turkish footballer
- 26 September: Georgios Kapnopoulos, Greek footballer
- 27 September: Granit Xhaka, Swiss international footballer
- 20 October: Mattia De Sciglio, Italian footballer
- 24 October: Giannis Dosis, Greek footballer
- 3 November: Willi Orban, German-born Hungarian international footballer
- 7 November: Tnoy Andrew, US Virgin Islands footballer
- 27 November: Andrey Mishkevich, Russian footballer
- 30 November: Thijs van Hofwegen, Dutch footballer
- 7 December: Martine Schon, Luxembourger footballer
- 13 December: Mory-Fallo Keïta, Guinean footballer
- 14 December: Ryo Miyaichi, Japanese footballer
- 24 December: Serge Aurier, Ivorian footballer
- 30 December: William Aho Abou, Ivorian footballer

== Deaths ==
=== February ===
- 17 February – Delio Morollón (54), Spanish footballer
- 24 February – August Lešnik (77), Croatian footballer

=== April ===
- 2 April – Juanito (37), Spanish footballer

=== September ===
- 12 September – Emilio Recoba (88), Uruguayan defender, last surviving winner of the 1930 FIFA World Cup
- 16 September – Larbi Ben Barek (78), Moroccan-French footballer

=== December ===
- 1 December – Anton Malatinský (72), Slovak football player and coach
