= Svantesson =

Svantesson is a surname. Notable people with the surname include:

- Svante Svantesson Banér (1624–1674), Swedish noble
- Sten Svantesson Bielke (1598–1638), statesman of the Swedish Empire
- Nils Svantesson Sture (born 1543), Swedish diplomat and soldier during the reign of Erik XIV of Sweden
- Elisabeth Svantesson (born 1967), Swedish politician of the Moderate Party
- Ian Svantesson (born 1993), American soccer player
- Jan-Olof Svantesson (born 1944), professor of linguistics at Lund University, Sweden
- Johan Svantesson (born 1992), Swedish footballer
- Lars Svantesson (born 1933), Swedish former freestyle swimmer
- Tobias Svantesson (born 1963), former professional tennis player from Sweden

== See also ==
- Santesson
- Svendsen
