= Ménager =

Ménager is a surname. Notable people with the surname include:

- Adrien Ménager (born 1991), French footballer
- Constant Ménager (1889–1970), French road bicycle racer
- Laurent Menager (1835–1902), Luxembourg composer, choirmaster, organist, and conductor
