= Yere =

Yere is both a given name and surname. Notable people with the name include:

- Mama Bah-Yéré (born 1992), Beninese footballer
- Menzie Yere (born 1983), Papua New Guinean rugby league footballer
- Yere Goud (born 1971), Indian cricketer

== See also ==
- "Yere faga", a 2017 song by Oumou Sangaré from the album Mogoya
