= Mussa Kaba =

German footballer (born 2008)

Personal information
- Date of birth: 17 November 2008 (age 17)
- Place of birth: Bielefeld, Germany
- Height: 1.96 m (6 ft 5 in)
- Positions: Midfielder; centre-back

Team information
- Current team: Borussia Dortmund
- Number: 48

Youth career
- –2025: Borussia Dortmund

Senior career*
Years	Team	Apps	(Gls)
2025–	Borussia Dortmund II	8	(0)
2026–	Borussia Dortmund	0	(0)

International career^{‡}
2024–	Germany U17	16	(1)
- * Club domestic league appearances and goals as of 23 September 2026 ‡ National team caps and goals as of 15 November 2025

Mussa Kaba (born 17 November 2008) is a German professional footballer who plays as a midfielder and centre-back for Bundesliga club Borussia Dortmund.

== Club career ==
As a youth player, Kaba joined the youth academy of Bundesliga side Borussia Dortmund, helping the club's under-17 team win the league title. Ahead of the 2025–26 season, he was promoted to their reserve team.

== International career ==
Kaba is a Germany youth international. During November 2025, he played for the Germany national under-17 football team at the 2025 FIFA U-17 World Cup.

== Style of play ==
Kaba plays as a defensive midfielder, central midfielder and centre-back. Spanish news website Vavel wrote in 2025 that he "is brilliant in aerial duels, he is strong, he is excellent at tackling and intercepting, and his passing is also incredibly accurate".

== Career statistics ==
=== Club ===
As of match played 1 March 2026

Appearances and goals by club, season and competition
Club	Season	League			Cup		Europe		Other		Total	
Club	Season	Division	Apps	Goals	Apps	Goals	Apps	Goals	Apps	Goals	Apps	Goals
Borussia Dortmund II	2025–26	Regionalliga West	6	0	—		—		2 (Note: Appearances in Premier League International Cup)	0	8	0
Borussia Dortmund	2025–26	Bundesliga	0	0	—		0	0	—		0	0
Borussia Dortmund	2026–27	Bundesliga	0	0	0	0	0	0	0	0	0	0
Borussia Dortmund	Total		0	0	0	0	0	0	0	0	0	0
Career total			6	0	0	0	0	0	2	0	8	0
