= Amian =

Amian is both a given name and a surname. Notable people with the name include:

- Amian Clement (born 1992), Ivorian footballer
- Kelvin Amian (born 1998), French footballer
