= Hamzath Mohamadou =

German footballer (born 2011)

Personal information
- Date of birth: 11 March 2011 (age 15)
- Place of birth: Wolfsburg, Germany
- Positions: Left winger; attacking midfielder

Team information
- Current team: Borussia Dortmund U19
- Number: 29

Youth career
- Years: Team
- –2024: VfL Wolfsburg
- 2024–: Borussia Dortmund

Hamzath Mohamadou (born 11 March 2011) is a German footballer who plays as a left winger and attacking midfielder for the under-19 team of Bundesliga club Borussia Dortmund.

== Club career ==
Born in Wolfsburg, Mohamadou is a youth product of VfL Wolfsburg, from which he joined Borussia Dortmund in 2024.

In the black and yellow's academy, he soon made headline with the youth teams.

As he establishing himself as a regular performer with the club's under-17 during the 2025–26 season while still aged only 14, he also played two games with the under-19 in the Youth League. He scored his first goal in the competition on 12 December 2025 during a 4–0 win over Bodø/Glimt, making him the youngest to do so that season at 14 years and 274 days, trailing only Max Dowman overall.

Despite being sidelined through injury at the end of the 2025–26 season, he signed a contract extension with the club until 2028. He was then already mentioned as a first team player with Dortmund for the following 2026–27 season, as reports of interest from the likes of Paris Saint-Germain and Real Madrid started emerging.

== Style of play ==
A right-footed forward with notable technical skills, allowing him to easily dribble and control the ball on offense, his preferred position is that of an inverted winger, coming from the left flank.

He has been compared to the likes of former BVB superstar Ousmane Dembélé.

== Personal life ==
Born and raised in Germany, Mohamadou also has Beninese origins. He is the younger brother of Akram-Dine Mohamadou, who first made headlines with Wolfenbüttel in the 2025–26 Oberliga Niedersachsen.
