= Leonardo Ramos =

Leonardo Ramos may refer to:

- Leonardo Ramos (footballer, born 1969), Uruguayan footballer
- Leonardo Ramos (footballer, born 1989), Argentine footballer
- Leonardo Ramos dos Santos (born 1992), Brazilian footballer
