= Hervenogi Unzola =

German footballer

Personal information
- Full name: Hervenogi Unzola
- Date of birth: 3 May 1992 (age 34)
- Place of birth: Germany
- Height: 1.82 m (6 ft 0 in)
- Position: Left back

Youth career
- 2006–2009: Bayer 04 Leverkusen
- 2009: Viktoria Köln
- 2010–2011: Borussia Dortmund

Senior career*
Years	Team	Apps	(Gls)
2010–2013	Borussia Dortmund II	18	(1)
2013–2014	Sportfreunde Lotte	4	(0)
2014–2017	SC Verl	78	(0)
2017–2018	Rot-Weiss Essen	17	(0)
2018–2019	Wattenscheid 09	18	(0)

International career
2009–2010	Germany U18	7	(0)
- * Club domestic league appearances and goals as of 20:31, 29 July 2019 (UTC)

Hervenogi Unzola is a German football defender who most recently played for SG Wattenscheid 09.

On 24 July 2013, he joined Sportfreunde Lotte in Regionalliga West. A year later he signed for SC Verl.
