= Liam Kanté =

Croatian footballer (born 2010)

Personal information
- Full name: Liam Claude Kanté
- Date of birth: 22 June 2010 (age 16)
- Place of birth: Zagreb, Croatia
- Position: Defender

Team information
- Current team: Borussia Dortmund U19
- Number: 30

Youth career
- –2024: NK HAŠK 1903 Zagreb
- 2024–2026: Lokomotiva Zagreb
- 2026–: Borussia Dortmund

International career^{‡}
Years	Team	Apps	(Gls)
2024–2025	Croatia U15	6	(1)
2025–	Croatia U16	2	(0)
- ‡ National team caps and goals as of 18 May 2025

Liam Claude Kanté (born 22 June 2010) is a Croatian footballer who plays as a defender for the under-19 team of Bundesliga club Borussia Dortmund.

== Early life ==
Kanté was born on 22 June 2010 in Zagreb, Croatia. The son of French footballer Manuel Kanté, he is of Malian descent through his father.

== Club career ==
As a youth player, Kanté joined the academy of Croatian side NK HAŠK 1903 Zagreb. Following his stint there, he joined the youth academy of Croatian side Lokomotiva Zagreb ahead of the 2022–23 season. Subsequently, he joined the youth academy of German side Borussia Dortmund during May 2026.

== International career ==
Kanté is a Croatia youth international. On 21 October 2025, he debuted for the Croatia national under-16 football team during a 1–1 home friendly draw with the Slovenia national under-16 football team.

== Style of play ==
Kanté plays as a defender. Known for his speed, he is left-footed.
