= Joane Gadou =

French footballer (born 2007)

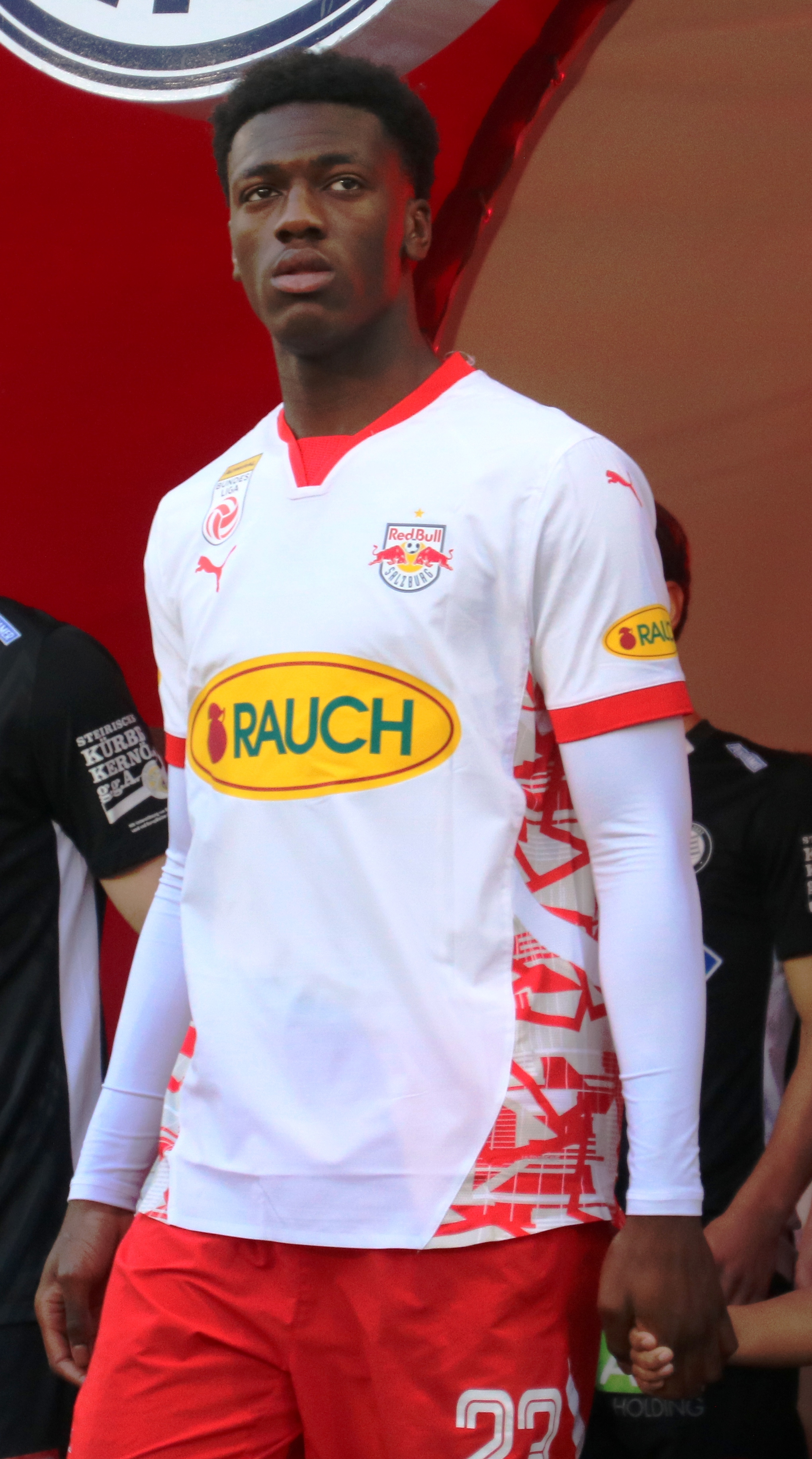
- Gadou with Red Bull Salzburg in 2025

Personal information
- Full name: Kouakou Henry-Joane Aaron Aimerick Gadou
- Date of birth: 17 January 2007 (age 19)
- Place of birth: Aubervilliers, France
- Height: 1.95 m (6 ft 5 in)
- Position: Centre-back

Team information
- Current team: Borussia Dortmund
- Number: 22

Youth career
- 2013–2020: ES Nangis
- 2020–2024: Paris Saint-Germain

Senior career*
Years	Team	Apps	(Gls)
2024–2026	Red Bull Salzburg	40	(0)
2024	→ FC Liefering (loan)	1	(0)
2026–	Borussia Dortmund	8	(0)

International career^{‡}
2022	France U16	4	(0)
2023–2024	France U17	14	(1)
2023	France U18	4	(0)
2024–	France U19	8	(0)
2026–	France U21	2	(0)
- * Club domestic league appearances and goals as of 20:30, 31 October 2026 (UTC) ‡ National team caps and goals as of 21:00, 3 October 2026 (UTC)

Kouakou Henry-Joane Aaron Aimerick Gadou (born 17 January 2007) is a French professional footballer who plays as a centre-back for Bundesliga club Borussia Dortmund.

In 2024, Gadou was named by English newspaper The Guardian as one of the best players born in 2007 worldwide.

== Club career ==
=== Early career ===
Born in Aubervilliers, Seine-Saint-Denis, Gadou's first youth team was ES Nangis in Nangis, Seine-et-Marne. Although a forward in his early days with the club, he was gradually moved down the pitch by his coaches, initially to midfield and finally to the defense, due to his great stature.

Gadou was eventually recruited by the Paris Saint-Germain Academy in 2020, with scouts discovering him when he played in the second departmental division for ES Nangis.

In the 2022–23 season, despite being only 16 years of age, Gadou was playing with the PSG under-19s in the Championnat National U19 and the UEFA Youth League, notably starting in PSG's defeat in the final of the former competition. In the second half of 2023, Le Parisien described Gadou as one of the "great hopes of the Parisian academy", and L'Équipe called him "one of the most promising French players in his position".

On 7 January 2024, Gadou was included in Paris Saint-Germain's first-team matchday squad for the first time, ahead of a Coupe de France match against Revel. He made his debut in a Ligue 1 squad on 1 March 2024, replacing the injured Danilo Pereira before a match against Monaco. Four days later, he was named in a UEFA Champions League squad for a match against Real Sociedad.

With the under-19s, Gadou achieved success in the Championnat National U19, starting in the 3–1 win over Auxerre in the final on 16 June 2024. On 7 August 2024, he made his senior debut for PSG in a 2–2 draw against Sturm Graz in a friendly.

In August 2024, it was reported by L'Équipe and RMC Sport that Gadou had declined to sign a professional contract with PSG, and that he would be sold during the ongoing transfer window.

=== Red Bull Salzburg ===
On 3 September 2024, Gadou signed for Austrian Bundesliga club Red Bull Salzburg on a three-year contract. A fee of €10 million (not including bonuses) circulated in the media, making it PSG's record sale for a player younger than 18.

=== Borussia Dortmund ===
On 12 May 2026, Gadou signed a five-year contract with Bundesliga side Borussia Dortmund.

== International career ==
Gadou has represented France at youth international level. At the 2023 UEFA European Under-17 Championship, he was one of two players (alongside Mathys Niflore) in the France under-17s to play one age group above. France went on to finish as runners-up of the tournament.

At the 2023 Lafarge Foot Avenir in Limoges, Gadou was part of the France under-18 squad that won the competition. He was the captain of the France under-17s that participated at the 2024 UEFA European Under-17 Championship.

== Style of play ==
Standing at a height of 1.95 m, Gadou plays as a centre-back and is right-footed. Le Parisien has described him as "tall, athletic, and not clumsy with the ball at his feet", adding that he is "efficient in both penalty areas". France under-17s head coach Jean-Luc Vannuchi described Gadou as a "force of nature", saying that he "combines power and speed, while being interesting with his use of the ball". He is both "capable of playing short [and] playing long", according to Vannuchi.

PSG youth coach Xavier Merguet likened Gadou's play style to that of former PSG player and academy graduate Tanguy Nianzou. Although often compared to fellow PSG product El Chadaille Bitshiabu due to their similar heights, Yohan Cabaye, assistant director of the PSG Academy, asserts that they are different players with different strengths, highlighting Gadou's efficiency in one-on-one situations and above-average speed.

== Personal life ==
Born in France, Gadou is of Ivorian descent.

== Career statistics ==
As of match played 31 October 2026

Appearances and goals by club, season and competition
Club	Season	League			National cup (Note: Includes Austrian Cup)		Europe		Other		Total	
Club	Season	Division	Apps	Goals	Apps	Goals	Apps	Goals	Apps	Goals	Apps	Goals
Red Bull Salzburg	2024–25	Austrian Bundesliga	21	0	1	0	0	0	3 (Note: Appearances in FIFA Club World Cup)	0	25	0
Red Bull Salzburg	2025–26	Austrian Bundesliga	19	0	3	0	11 (Note: Four appearances in UEFA Champions League, seven appearances in UEFA Europa League)	0	—		33	0
Red Bull Salzburg	Total		40	0	4	0	11	0	3	0	58	0
FC Liefering (loan)	2024–25	2. Liga	1	0	0	0	—		—		1	0
Borussia Dortmund	2026–27	Bundesliga	8	0	1	0	3 (Note: Appearances in UEFA Champions League)	0	1 (Note: Appearance in Franz Beckenbauer Supercup)	0	13	0
Career total			49	0	5	0	14	0	4	0	72	0

== Honours ==
Paris Saint-Germain U19

- Championnat National U19: 2023–24

France U17

- UEFA European Under-17 Championship runner-up: 2023

France U18

- Lafarge Foot Avenir: 2023
