= Borussia Dortmund Youth Sector =

- Full name: Ballspielverein Borussia 09 e.V. Dortmund
- President: Hans-Joachim Watzke
- Head of youth academy: Paul Schaffran
- Website: www.bvb.de
Home colours	Away colours	Third colours

Borussia Dortmund Youth Sector is the youth set-up of Borussia Dortmund. The club's youth academy, officially known as the Nachwuchsleistungszentrum (NLZ), is based at the club's training centre in Brackel, Dortmund. It comprises teams from under-9 to under-19 level, while the under-23 team serves as the final development stage between the youth academy and professional football.

Paul Schaffran has been head of the youth academy since July 2025, with former professional footballer Thomas Broich serving as sporting director. Former academy director Lars Ricken, himself a Borussia Dortmund youth graduate and former Germany international, became the club's managing director for sport in May 2024.

The academy has produced numerous players who later established themselves in the Bundesliga and at international level, including Eike Immel, Michael Zorc, Lars Ricken, Marcel Schmelzer, Marco Reus, Mario Götze and Kevin Großkreutz. Götze and Großkreutz were members of the Germany squad that won the 2014 FIFA World Cup, with Götze scoring the winning goal in the final.

== Organization ==
Borussia Dortmund's youth academy is based at the club's training centre in Brackel, adjacent to the training facilities of the professional team. The youth development structure comprises teams from under-9 level through to the under-23 team. The academy facilities include a youth residence, the Footbonaut, fitness facilities and educational programmes intended to support the players alongside their sporting development.

=== Training facilities and education ===
A youth residence was opened at the Brackel training centre in February 2014 to accommodate academy players from outside the Dortmund area. Located directly at the youth training facilities, it provides accommodation for 22 players.

The club maintains a network of educational partners to combine competitive football with schooling. Borussia Dortmund began cooperating with the Geschwister-Scholl-Gesamtschule in August 2014 and with the Goethe-Gymnasium Dortmund in 2015. Both schools became part of the DFB's Elite School of Football network in January 2017. During the 2016–17 season, the Konrad-Klepping-Berufskolleg was added as an educational partner, allowing academy players to pursue additional educational qualifications; it joined the Elite School of Football network in March 2019.

Educational and social support is provided by club staff and personnel working with the partner schools, including tutoring for academy players. Borussia Dortmund also operates its own transport service for players living in the wider region, with more than 30 drivers transporting them from school to training in Brackel and back home.

=== BVB Evonik Football Academy ===
Alongside its youth academy, the club operates the BVB Evonik Football Academy, which was launched as the BVB Evonik Fußballschule in the summer of 2011. The original programme offered football camps for boys and girls aged seven to 13 at the club's former training ground Im Rabenloh.

The programme subsequently developed into the BVB Evonik Football Academy. Its current course programme is open to boys and girls aged four to 13 and ranges from introductory activities for younger children to football courses for particularly talented players. The academy also offers holiday and development programmes at locations outside Dortmund.

=== International partnerships ===
Borussia Dortmund began expanding its youth development activities internationally during the 2010s. The club established partnerships and development programmes abroad through which it shared its training philosophy, coaching methods and expertise in youth development. These initiatives have included cooperation with local clubs and schools, coaching education, football camps and longer-term academy programmes.

An early example was the cooperation established in 2014 with the United States youth clubs Cincinnati United and La Roca Futbol Club. The partnerships included the exchange of training methods and coaching expertise as well as annual training camps conducted by Borussia Dortmund coaching staff.

Over the following years, Borussia Dortmund expanded these activities into a broader international network of academies and youth development partnerships. In 2023, the AMM Foundation became the club's official youth development partner in India, with the cooperation covering academy structures, player development, coach education and organisational development.

In 2024, Borussia Dortmund entered into a long-term partnership with the RIS Swiss Section – Deutschsprachige Schule Bangkok, whose existing football programme was developed into BVB International Academy Thailand. The cooperation includes a permanently based BVB coach as well as training and development programmes for players and coaches.

Further educational partnerships followed with the German European School Singapore in February 2025 and the German International School Sydney in May 2025. At the time of the Sydney agreement, Borussia Dortmund also reported existing partnerships with German schools in Shanghai, Tokyo, Singapore, Bangkok and Hong Kong.

In February 2026, the club launched BVB International Academy Ghana in Accra in partnership with Accra Shooting Stars FC. Based at Achimota School and offering programmes for boys and girls aged six to 18, it became Borussia Dortmund's first International Academy in Africa and a member of the club's global International Academy network.

== Youth teams ==
=== Under-19 ===
The team currently competes in the U19 DFB-Nachwuchsliga and the UEFA Youth League. It also participates in the DFB-Pokal der Junioren, the Under 19 Westphalian Cup and the Premier League International Cup. Felix Hirschnagl has been the head coach since July 2025.

As of 10 August 2026

Note: Flags indicate national team as defined under FIFA eligibility rules; some limited exceptions apply. Players may hold more than one non-FIFA nationality.

No.	Pos.	Nation	Player
1	GK	GER	Julien Froese
2	DF	GER	Niklas König
3	DF	GER	Semih Kaymak
4	DF	GER	Jan-Luca Riedl
5	DF	GER	Lenni Strößner
6	MF	GER	Luke Fahrenhorst
7	FW	GER	Fadi Zarqelain
8	MF	GER	Tom Faust
9	FW	GER	Ahmad Najdi
10	MF	POL	Justin Hoy (captain)
11	MF	GER	Marwan-Omir Mirza
12	GK	GER	Paul Hannig
13	DF	SUI	Miguel Adje
17	FW	GER	Peniel Poba

No.	Pos.	Nation	Player
18	DF	GER	Roméo Ritter
19	MF	GER	Mats Brauckmann
20	MF	GER	Luis Alaze
21	MF	GRE	Christos Kostoglou
22	GK	GER	Jan-Mattis Wehrbein
23	MF	LUX	Enzo Duarte
24	FW	GER	Johann Jaensch
26	FW	GER	Lyon Tepic
27	FW	GER	Keron Hagemann
28	FW	ISL	Bjarki Garðarsson
29	FW	GER	Hamzath Mohamadou
30	DF	CRO	Liam Kanté
37	DF	GER	Levin Vogt
40	MF	GER	Till Burkhardt

=== Under-17 ===
The team currently competes in the U17 DFB-Nachwuchsliga and the Under 17 Westphalian Cup. Karsten Gorges has been the head coach since July 2026.

As of 20 August 2025

Note: Flags indicate national team as defined under FIFA eligibility rules; some limited exceptions apply. Players may hold more than one non-FIFA nationality.

No.	Pos.	Nation	Player
1	GK	GER	Bennet Birtner
2	DF	GRE	Ben Hermann
3	DF	TUR	Emre Kirar
4	DF	GRE	Georgios Zisopoulos (captain)
5	DF	GER	Maximilian Nass
6	MF	GER	Maximilian Klingenheben
7	FW	GER	Janis Tunkel
8	MF	MAR	Ilyas Arzini
9	FW	GER	Athanasios Grammozis
10	MF	GER	Niclas Goldberg
11	FW	GER	Jonas Schwarzer
12	GK	GER	Finn van der Hoeck
13	DF	GER	Emil Lorenscheit

No.	Pos.	Nation	Player
14	DF	GER	Nathaniel Owusu
15	DF	GER	Davis Okojie
16	MF	GER	Tim Bakary Bojang
17	MF	NGR	Chinedu Jibunor
18	FW	GER	Edon Qetinaj
19	FW	GER	Adriano Bejta
20	MF	SRB	Nikola Jekic
21	DF	GER	Septimus Bah
22	GK	GER	Jayden Kusi
23	FW	GER	Jonas Chowaniec
24	MF	GRE	Georgios Telidis
25	FW	GER	Adam Braham

== Current technical staff ==
Role	Under-19	Under-17
Head coach	(Germany) Felix Hirschnagl	(Germany) Karsten Gorges
Assistant coach	(Germany) Julian Koch (Germany) Sahin Kösecik	(Italy) Sandro Stuppia
Goalkeeper coach	(Germany) Tobias Ritz	(Germany) Michael Strzys

== Honours ==
- Under 19 championship

Winners (9): 1993–94, 1994–95, 1995–96, 1996–97, 1997–98, 2015–16, 2016–17, 2018–19, 2021–22
Runners-up (3): 2008–09, 2022–23, 2023–24

- Under 17 championship

Winners (8): 1983–84, 1992–93, 1995–96, 1997–98, 2013–14, 2014–15, 2017–18, 2023–24
Runners-up (7): 1998–99, 2000–01, 2005–06, 2006–07, 2007–08, 2015–16, 2018–19

- Under 19 Bundesliga West

Winners (6): 2008–09, 2015–16, 2016–17, 2021–22, 2022–23, 2023–24
Runners-up (3): 2017–18, 2018–19, 2019–20

- Under 17 Bundesliga West

Winners (6): 2007–08, 2013–14, 2014–15, 2015–16, 2017–18, 2018–19
Runners-up (6): 2006–07, 2010–11, 2016–17, 2019–20, 2022–23, 2023–24

- DFB-Pokal der Junioren

Runners-up (2): 2008–09, 2021–22

- NRW-Ligapokal der Junioren

Winners (1): 2021–22

- Under 19 Westphalia Cup

Winners (5): 2006–07, 2007–08, 2009–10, 2011–12, 2014–15
Runners-up (2): 2012–13, 2021–22

- Under 17 Westphalia Cup

Winners (5): 2006–07, 2008–09, 2013–14, 2023–24, 2025–26
Runners-up (4): 2011–12, 2012–13, 2015–16, 2017–18

== International youth graduates ==
This is a list of players who have made at least one appearance for a Borussia Dortmund youth team and have represented their country at full international level.

As of 6 October 2026

Name	National football team	Notes
Augustine Ahinful	Ghana	
Mathis Albert	United States	
Mihail Aleksandrov	Bulgaria	
Enis Alushi	Kosovo	
Etienne Amenyido	Togo	
Viktor Angelov	North Macedonia	
Jacob Bruun Larsen	Denmark	
Dženis Burnić	Bosnia and Herzegovina	
Vladimir But	Russia	
Cole Campbell	United States	
Nnamdi Collins	Germany	
Kerem Demirbay	Germany	Winner Confederations Cup 2017
Enzo Duarte	Luxembourg	
Marvin Ducksch	Germany	
Jeremy Dudziak	Tunisia	
Julien Duranville	Belgium	
Chris Führich	Germany	
Bashiru Gambo	Ghana	
Sergio Gómez	Spain	
Daniel Gordon	Jamaica	
Jon Gorenc Stanković	Slovenia	
Mario Götze	Germany	Winner World Cup 2014
Kevin Großkreutz	Germany	Winner World Cup 2014
Eike Immel	Germany	Winner European Championship 1980; Runner-up World Cup 1982 & World Cup 1986
Samuele Inácio	Italy	
Alexander Isak	Sweden	
Issa Issa	Lebanon	
Helmut Kapitulski	Germany	
Erdal Keser	Turkey	
August Lenz	Germany	
Filippo Mane	Italy	
Orel Mangala	Belgium	
Youssoufa Moukoko	Germany	
Patrick Njambe	Cameroon	
David Odonkor	Germany	Runner-up European Championship 2008; Third-place World Cup 2006
Yasin Öztekin	Turkey	
Immanuel Pherai	Suriname	
Christian Pulisic	United States	Winner CONCACAF Nations League 2021, 2023, & 2024
Luca Reggiani	Italy	
Marco Reus	Germany	
Giovanni Reyna	United States	Winner CONCACAF Nations League 2021, 2023, & 2024
Lars Ricken	Germany	Runner-up World Cup 2002
Antonio Rüdiger	Germany	Winner Confederations Cup 2017
Nuri Şahin	Turkey	
Kosi Saka	(Democratic Republic of the Congo) DR Congo	
Jadon Sancho	England	Runner-up European Championship 2020
Marcel Schmelzer	Germany	
Ibrahim Tanko	Ghana	
Sebastian Tyrała	Poland	
Miroslav Votava	Germany	Winner European Championship 1980
Michael Zorc	Germany	

== Fritz Walter Medal ==
First awarded in 2005, the Fritz Walter Medal is a series of annual awards given by the German Football Association to German youth footballers. The following youth graduates have won the medal.

As of 10 August 2026

Year	Category	Medal	Player
2005	Under 18	Gold	Marc-André Kruska
2005	Under 17	Bronze	Sebastian Tyrała
2009	Under 17	Gold	Mario Götze
2010	Under 18	Gold	Mario Götze
2012	Under 19	Gold	Antonio Rüdiger
2015	Under 17	Gold	Felix Passlack
2018	Under 17	Bronze	Luca Unbehaun
2021	Under 19	Silver	Ansgar Knauff
2021	Under 17	Gold	Youssoufa Moukoko
2023	Under 19	Gold	Youssoufa Moukoko
2023	Under 17	Gold	Paris Brunner

1: Tyrała began his career with the Germany national youth football team. Later he switched to Poland.
