= Enzo dos Santos =

Luxembourgish footballer (born 2009)

Personal information
- Full name: Enzo de Pina Duarte dos Santos
- Date of birth: 28 January 2009 (age 17)
- Place of birth: Luxembourg
- Height: 1.86 m (6 ft 1 in)
- Position: Midfielder

Team information
- Current team: Borussia Dortmund
- Number: 44

Youth career
- 2017–2019: FC Blo-Wäiss Izeg
- 2020–2025: Swift Hesperange
- 2025–: Borussia Dortmund

Senior career*
Years	Team	Apps	(Gls)
2026–	Borussia Dortmund II	0	(0)
2026–	Borussia Dortmund	0	(0)

International career^{‡}
2024–2025	Luxembourg U16	4	(0)
2024–2026	Luxembourg U17	5	(1)
2025–	Luxembourg	10	(0)
- * Club domestic league appearances and goals as of 18 March 2026 ‡ National team caps and goals as of 16 November 2026

Enzo de Pina Duarte dos Santos (born 28 January 2009) is a Luxembourgish professional footballer who plays as a midfielder for Bundesliga club Borussia Dortmund and the Luxembourg national team.

== Club career ==
Son of Cape Verdean goalkeeper Cadabra, dos Santos is a youth product of Swift Hesperange in Luxembourg, before moving to the youth academy of German club Borussia Dortmund in January 2025, whilst already reporting offers from other big European clubs. There he soon proved his talent and versatility in the midfield, establishing himself as Dortmund under-17's playmaker. Ahead of the 2026–27 season, dos Santos was promoted to the senior squad. On 19 August 2026, he signed a professional long-term contract with Borussia.

== International career ==
Born in Luxembourg, dos Santos also has Cape Verdean origins per his father. He is a youth international for Luxembourg, having played for the under-16 and under-17.

In March 2025, he was first called to the Luxembourg senior team for two friendlies against Sweden and Switzerland. He was by then potentially only 72 hours short of beating Vincent Thill's precocity record, which would have made him Luxembourg's second youngest ever international. But he did not play neither in the 1–0 beating of Sweden nor in the 3–1 loss to Switzerland.

He was selected again by Luc Holtz the following June, for two other friendlies, making his debut against the Republic of Ireland on 10 June 2025.

== Career statistics ==
=== Club ===
As of match played 18 March 2026

Appearances and goals by club, season and competition
Club	Season	League			Cup		Europe		Other		Total	
Club	Season	Division	Apps	Goals	Apps	Goals	Apps	Goals	Apps	Goals	Apps	Goals
Borussia Dortmund II	2025–26	Regionalliga West	—		—		—		2 (Note: Appearances in Premier League International Cup)	0	2	0
Career total			0	0	0	0	0	0	2	0	2	0
