= Luca Reggiani =

Italian footballer (born 2008)

Personal information
- Date of birth: 9 January 2008 (age 18)
- Place of birth: Modena, Italy
- Height: 1.94 m (6 ft 4 in)
- Position: Centre-back

Team information
- Current team: Borussia Dortmund
- Number: 49

Youth career
- 2013–2016: Castelvetro Calcio
- 2016–2024: Sassuolo
- 2024–: Borussia Dortmund

Senior career*
Years	Team	Apps	(Gls)
2025–	Borussia Dortmund II	4	(0)
2026–	Borussia Dortmund	9	(1)

International career^{‡}
2022–2023	Italy U15	10	(2)
2023–2024	Italy U16	11	(1)
2024–2025	Italy U17	13	(2)
2025	Italy U18	1	(0)
2026–	Italy U19	3	(0)
2026–	Italy	1	(0)
Medal record
Men's football
Representing Italy
FIFA U-17 World Cup
Third place	2025 Qatar
- * Club domestic league appearances and goals as of 5 September 2026 ‡ National team caps and goals as of 7 June 2026

Luca Reggiani (born 9 January 2008) is an Italian professional footballer who plays as a defender for Bundesliga club Borussia Dortmund and the Italy national team.

== Early life ==
Reggiani was born on 9 January 2008. Born in Modena, Italy, he started playing football at the age of five. Growing up, he regarded Italy international Giorgio Scalvini as his football idol.

== Club career ==
At the age of eight, Reggiani joined the youth academy of Italian side Sassuolo. In 2024, he joined the youth academy of German side Borussia Dortmund, where he played in the UEFA Youth League and helped the under-17 team win the league title.

On 7 February 2026, Reggiani made his senior debut for Borussia Dortmund as a late substitute in a 2–1 away win over Wolfsburg in the Bundesliga. On 17 February, he started his first match in a 2–0 win over Atalanta in the Champions League knockout play-offs. A month later, on 14 March, he scored his first Bundesliga goal in a 2–0 win over Augsburg. A week later, on 20 March, he signed his first long-term professional contract with the club.

== International career ==
Reggiani is an Italy youth international. During November 2024 and March 2025, he played for the Italy national under-17 football team, which finished in third place at the 2025 FIFA U-17 World Cup.

In May 2026, he was one of the players who were called up with the Italy national senior squad by interim head coach Silvio Baldini, for the friendly matches against Luxembourg and Greece on 3 and 7 June 2026, respectively. He made his debut for the national team in a substitute appearance against Greece, but was subsequently sent off in the 68th minute.

== Style of play ==
Reggiani plays as a defender and is right-footed. Italian news website La Giovane Italia wrote in 2024 that he "stands out for his attention and aggressiveness in marking... Despite being gifted with an excellent height... he can boast good parameters in terms of speed and pace".

== Career statistics ==
=== Club ===
As of match played 5 September 2026

Appearances and goals by club, season and competition
Club	Season	League			DFB-Pokal		Europe		Other		Total	
Club	Season	Division	Apps	Goals	Apps	Goals	Apps	Goals	Apps	Goals	Apps	Goals
Borussia Dortmund II	2025–26	Regionalliga West	4	0	—		—		4 (Note: Appearances in Premier League International Cup)	0	8	0
Borussia Dortmund	2025–26	Bundesliga	8	1	0	0	1 (Note: Appearances in UEFA Champions League)	0	—		9	1
Borussia Dortmund	2026–27	Bundesliga	1	0	1	0	0	0	—		2	0
Borussia Dortmund	Total		9	1	1	0	1	0	—		11	1
Career total			13	1	1	0	1	0	4	0	19	1

=== International ===
As of match played 7 June 2026

Appearances and goals by national team and year
National team	Year	Apps	Goals
Italy	2026	1	0
Total		1	0

== Honours ==
Italy U17

- FIFA U-17 World Cup third place: 2025
