= Mathis Albert =

American soccer player (born 2009)

Personal information
- Full name: Mathis Albert
- Date of birth: May 21, 2009 (age 17)
- Place of birth: Greenville, South Carolina, US
- Height: 1.79 m (5 ft 10 in)
- Positions: Winger; attacking midfielder

Team information
- Current team: Borussia Dortmund
- Number: 41

Youth career
- Carolina Elite Soccer Academy
- San Diego Surf
- –2024: LA Galaxy
- 2024–: Borussia Dortmund

Senior career*
Years	Team	Apps	(Gls)
2025–	Borussia Dortmund II	10	(1)
2026–	Borussia Dortmund	2	(0)

International career^{‡}
2023	United States U15	3	(1)
2024	United States U16	1	(2)
2024–2026	United States U17	10	(3)
2026–	United States U19	1	(0)
2026–	United States	5	(1)
- * Club domestic league appearances and goals as of October 17, 2026 ‡ National team caps and goals as of November 14, 2026

Mathis Albert (born May 21, 2009) is an American professional soccer player who plays as a winger and attacking midfielder for Bundesliga club Borussia Dortmund and the United States national team.

== Club career ==
Albert was born on May 21, 2009, in Greenville, South Carolina. Albert was born to a French father and an American mother of German descent, giving him citizenship to both countries through Jus sanguinis (right of blood). As a youth player, he joined the academy of American side LA Galaxy. Albert received interest from Dutch and French sides while playing for the club. He started training with their reserve team ahead of the 2024 season. In 2024, he joined the youth academy of German side Borussia Dortmund.

Albert was a member of the Dortmund squad that competed in the 2025 FIFA Club World Cup, becoming, at the age of 16 years and 27 days, the youngest player of the tournament, although he never came off the bench. On April 26, 2026, at 16 years and 340 days old, he became the youngest American to play in the Bundesliga by coming onto the pitch in the final minutes of the 4–0 win against SC Freiburg. This surpassed the previous American record held by Giovanni Reyna who was 17 years and 2 months old at debut.

== International career ==
Albert is a United States youth international. He has played for the United States national under-15 team, the United States national under-16 team, and the United States national under-17 team.

Albert was one of the 16 players who were called up for the March 2026 friendlies by United States under-19 team head coach Gonzalo Segares. He made his debut with the United States under-19 team in a 4–0 victory over Wales under-19 team on March 28, 2026.

In September 2026, Albert received his first call up to the United States national team by head coach Mauricio Pochettino for friendly matches against Peru, Chile, Mexico, and Canada. He made his senior debut on September 26 in a 4–1 win over Peru, coming on as a substitute and quickly drawing a penalty call that Malik Tillman converted. On September 29, in a 4―2 win over Chile, he broke the record of Christian Pulisic to become the youngest American goalscorer in history at 17 years and 131 days old. His record would only last four days, after it was broken by Cavan Sullivan in a 3―0 win over Mexico on October 3.

== Style of play ==
Albert is right-footed. He is known for his speed and for his dribbling ability.

== Career statistics ==
=== Club ===
As of match played October 17, 2026

Appearances and goals by club, season and competition
Club	Season	League			DFB-Pokal		Europe		Other		Total	
Club	Season	Division	Apps	Goals	Apps	Goals	Apps	Goals	Apps	Goals	Apps	Goals
Borussia Dortmund II	2025–26	Regionalliga West	9	1	—		—		5 (Note: Appearances in Premier League International Cup)	2	14	3
Borussia Dortmund	2025–26	Bundesliga	1	0	0	0	0	0	—		1	0
Borussia Dortmund	2026–27	Bundesliga	1	0	1	0	0	0	0	0	2	0
Borussia Dortmund	Total		2	0	1	0	0	0	0	0	3	0
Career total			11	1	1	0	0	0	5	2	17	3

=== International ===
As of match played November 14, 2026

Appearances and goals by national team and year
National team	Year	Apps	Goals
United States	2026	5	1
Total		5	1

Scores and results list United States' goal tally first, score column indicates score after each Albert goal.

List of international goals scored by Mathis Albert
No.	Date	Venue	Opponent	Score	Result	Competition
1	29 September 2026	Energizer Park, St. Louis, United States	Chile	4–2	4–2	Friendly
