= Justin Lerma =

Ecuadorian footballer (born 2008)

Personal information
- Full name: Justin Armando Lerma Soliz
- Date of birth: 5 May 2008 (age 18)
- Place of birth: Guayaquil, Ecuador
- Position: Attacking midfielder

Team information
- Current team: Borussia Dortmund

Youth career
- 2017–2019: Guayaquil City
- 2021–2024: Independiente del Valle

Senior career*
Years	Team	Apps	(Gls)
2024–2026	Independiente del Valle	30	(1)
2026–	Borussia Dortmund	0	(0)

International career^{‡}
2024	Ecuador U15	8	(4)
2024–2025	Ecuador U17	7	(3)
2024–2025	Ecuador U20	4	(0)
- * Club domestic league appearances and goals as of 31 May 2026 ‡ National team caps and goals as of 11 April 2025

Justin Armando Lerma Soliz (born 5 May 2008) is an Ecuadorian professional footballer who plays as an attacking midfielder for Bundesliga club Borussia Dortmund.

== Club career ==
Born in Guayaquil, Lerma started his career with Guayaquil City at the age of 8. Later he joined Independiente Del Valle academy. In April 2024 at the age of fifteen he was promoted to the Independiente del Valle's first team. He was an unused substitute in Copa Libertadores group stage match against San Lorenzo on 10 April 2024. He was 15 and because of his appearance and a well-developed physique for his age, thousands of users have joked about whether he is really 15 years old or not. A video with his statements has become a real viral phenomenon with more than 2 million views. He made his professional debut with Independiente Del Valle in a 2–2 Ecuadorian Serie A draw with Universidad Católica on 14 April 2024.

In May 2024, Lerma's transfer to German club Borussia Dortmund was announced. However, due to his young age, the player did not move to Germany until mid-2026, as such transfers are only permitted for adult players. In June 2026, he signed a contract with the club until 2031.

== Career statistics ==
As of match played 9 May 2026

Appearances and goals by club, season and competition
Club	Season	League			National cup		Continental		Other		Total	
Club	Season	Division	Apps	Goals	Apps	Goals	Apps	Goals	Apps	Goals	Apps	Goals
Independiente del Valle	2024	LigaPro Serie A	11	0	0	0	0	0	—		11	0
Independiente del Valle	2025	LigaPro Serie A	9	0	1	0	1 (Note: Appearance in Copa Sudamericana)	0	—		11	0
Independiente del Valle	2026	LigaPro Serie A	8	1	0	0	0	0	—		8	1
Independiente del Valle	Total		28	1	1	0	1	0	—		31	1
Borussia Dortmund	2026–27	Bundesliga	0	0	0	0	0	0	0	0	0	0
Career total			28	1	1	0	1	0	0	0	31	1
