= Jaime Turégano =

Spanish footballer

Jaime
Personal information
- Full name: Jaime Turégano González
- Date of birth: 20 February 1992 (age 34)
- Place of birth: Madrid, Spain
- Height: 1.83 m (6 ft 0 in)
- Position: Left-back

Team information
- Current team: Trival Valderas

Youth career
- Atlético Pinto

Senior career*
Years	Team	Apps	(Gls)
2010–2013	Atlético Pinto	76	(6)
2013–2014	Alcorcón B	31	(5)
2014–2015	Alcorcón	2	(0)
2014–2015	→ Lealtad (loan)	23	(0)
2015–2017	Atlético Pinto	61	(7)
2017–2020	Las Rozas	87	(15)
2020–2021	Móstoles	12	(0)
2021–2022	Atlético Pinto		
2023–2024	Cala Pozuelo		
2024–	Trival Valderas	6	(0)
- * Club domestic league appearances and goals as of 13 October 2024

Jaime Turégano González, simply known as Jaime (born 20 February 1992), is a Spanish professional footballer who plays as a left-back for Trival Valderas.

== Football career ==
Born in Madrid, Jaime made his senior debuts with local Atlético de Pinto in the 2010–11 season, in the Tercera División. On 16 July 2013 he rescinded his link with the club and joined neighbouring AD Alcorcón, being initially assigned to the reserves also in the fourth level.

On 18 January 2014 Jaime made his first appearance with the main squad, playing the last four minutes of a 4–0 away rout of CD Tenerife in the Segunda División. On 18 August he moved to CD Lealtad of the Segunda División B.
