= John Steven Rivera =

Colombian footballer (born 1992)

John Stiven Rivera
Personal information
- Full name: John Stiven Rivera Murillo
- Date of birth: 23 February 1992 (age 34)
- Place of birth: Cali, Colombia
- Height: 1.70 m (5 ft 7 in)
- Position: Midfielder

Youth career
- América de Cali

Senior career*
Years	Team	Apps	(Gls)
2014–2018	América de Cali	18	(0)
2016–2017	→ Ñublense (loan)	6	(0)
2018	Jaguares de Córdoba	2	(0)
2019	Universitario Popayán	13	(1)
2019–2020	Boca Juniors Cali		
2021	Delfines del Este		
2021	Atlántico		
- * Club domestic league appearances and goals

John Stiven Rivera Murillo (born 23 February 1992) is a Colombian professional footballer who plays as a midfielder.

== Teams ==
- (Colombia) América de Cali 2014–2016
- (Chile) Ñublense 2016–2017
- (Colombia) Jaguares de Córdoba 2018
- (Colombia) Universitario Popayán 2019
- (Colombia) Boca Juniors de Cali 2019–2020
- (Dominican Republic) Delfines del Este 2021
- (Dominican Republic) Atlántico 2021
