= Francesco Gazo =

Italian footballer

Personal information
- Date of birth: 29 February 1992 (age 34)
- Place of birth: Varese, Italy
- Height: 1.74 m (5 ft 9 in)
- Position: Midfielder

Team information
- Current team: Lazzate

Youth career
- –2005: Azzate Calcio Mornago
- –2009: Varese
- 2009–2011: AlbinoLeffe

Senior career*
Years	Team	Apps	(Gls)
2011–2015	AlbinoLeffe	64	(0)
2011–2012	→ Pro Vercelli (loan)	0	(0)
2012	→ Prato (loan)	8	(0)
2015–2017	Varese	37	(0)
2017–2019	Pro Patria	68	(0)
2019–2020	Seregno	26	(1)
2020–2023	Città di Varese	55	(0)
2024–	Paradiso	15	(0)
2024–	Lazzate		
- * Club domestic league appearances and goals as of 20 July 2024

Francesco Gazo (born 29 February 1992) is an Italian footballer who plays for Lazzate.

== Club career ==
Born in Varese, Lombardy, Gazo started his career at Azzate Calcio Mornago and then at A.S. Varese 1910. In August 2009 he was signed by another Lombard club AlbinoLeffe of Serie B, re-joining former teammate Nicholas Allievi. He spent 2 seasons in the reserve team from 2009 to 2011. In 2011, he was signed by Lega Pro Prima Divisione club Pro Vercelli and was a player on the reserve team as an overage player. On 13 January 2012 he was signed by Prato.

Gazo returned to AlbinoLeffe in 2012, relegating the club to the Prime Divisione. The club failed to win the promotion playoffs in 2014.

On 13 July 2019, he joined Serie D club Seregno.
