= Vando =

São Toméan footballer

Personal information
- Full name: Vando Jorge Lopes Da Costa Neto
- Date of birth: 24 July 1992 (age 34)
- Position: Midfielder

Team information
- Current team: UDRA

Senior career*
Years	Team	Apps	(Gls)
–2015	Praia Cruz		
2016–	UDRA		

International career^{‡}
2015–	São Tomé and Príncipe	5	(0)
- * Club domestic league appearances and goals ‡ National team caps and goals as of 24 March 2018

Vando Jorge Lopes Da Costa Neto (born 24 July 1992), simply known as Vando, is a São Toméan footballer who plays as a midfielder for UD Rei Amador and the São Tomé and Príncipe national team.

== International career ==
Vando made his international debut for São Tomé and Príncipe in 2015.
