= Mark Engberink =

Dutch footballer

Personal information
- Full name: Mark Engberink
- Date of birth: 12 August 1992 (age 34)
- Place of birth: Enschede, Netherlands
- Height: 1.76 m (5 ft 9 1/2 in)
- Position: Left back

Youth career
- LSV Lonneker
- –2014: FC Twente

Senior career*
| Years | Team | Apps | (Gls) |
| 2013–2014 | FC Twente | 0 | (0) |
| 2013–2014 | Jong FC Twente | 8 | (0) |
| 2014–2015 | Heracles | 3 | (0) |
| 2015–2017 | RKC | 37 | (0) |
| 2017–2019 | HSC '21 | 1 | (0) |
- * Club domestic league appearances and goals as of 2 September 2017

Mark Engberink (born 12 August 1992) is a Dutch retired footballer who played as a left back.

== Club career ==
He formerly played for FC Twente and Heracles Almelo. In 2015, the player from Lonneker signed a one-year contract with RKC.

Engberink, who grew up in Lonneker, descended in amateur football, when he joined Derde Divisie side HSC '21 in summer 2017. He quit football in 2019 to focus on his career outside of the sport.
