= Santesson =

Santesson is a Swedish surname. People of interest called Santesson are:

- Hans Stefan Santesson (1914–1975) American writer and editor of science fiction and fantasy literature
- Anton Santesson (b. 1994) Swedish ice hockey player
- Awa Santesson-Sey (b. 1997) Swedish singer
- Nils Santesson (1873–1960) Swedish sculptor, writer and pewterer
