= Nick Harel =

Mauritian footballer

Personal information
- Date of birth: 11 January 1992 (age 34)
- Place of birth: Port Louis, Mauritius
- Position: Midfielder

Team information
- Current team: Bolton City

Senior career*
Years	Team	Apps	(Gls)
2015–	Bolton City		

International career^{‡}
2017–2018	Mauritius	6	(0)
- * Club domestic league appearances and goals as of 09:15, 15 March 2018 (UTC) ‡ National team caps and goals as of 09:15, 15 March 2018 (UTC)

Nick Harel (born 11 January 1992) is a Mauritian international footballer who plays for Bolton City as a midfielder.

== Career ==
He has played club football for Bolton City.

He made his international debut for Mauritius in 2017.
