= William Aho Abou =

Ivorian professional footballer

Personal information
- Full name: William Aho Abou
- Date of birth: 30 December 1992 (age 33)
- Place of birth: Anyama, Ivory Coast
- Height: 1.77 m (5 ft 9 1/2 in)
- Position: Midfielder

Senior career*
Years	Team	Apps	(Gls)
2009–2012	Montpellier B	49	(0)
2012–2013	Arles-Avignon	9	(0)
- * Club domestic league appearances and goals as of 03:55, 27 May 2016 (UTC)

William Aho Abou (born 30 December 1992) is an Ivorian professional footballer, who recently played as an attacking midfielder for Arles-Avignon.
