= 2026–27 Borussia Dortmund season =

Borussia Dortmund
2026–27 season
- Chairman: Lars Ricken (CEO)
- Head coach: Niko Kovač
- Stadium: Westfalenstadion
- Bundesliga: 2nd
- DFB-Pokal: Round of 16
- Franz Beckenbauer Supercup: Runners-up
- UEFA Champions League: League phase
- Top goalscorer: League: Felix Nmecha (4); All: Serhou Guirassy (8)
- Highest home attendance: 81,365 (6 matches)
- Lowest home attendance: 77,500 v Villarreal
- Average home league attendance: 81,365
Home colours	Away colours	Third colours

The 2026–27 season is the 118th season in the existence of Borussia Dortmund, and the club's 51st consecutive season in the top flight of German football. In addition to the domestic league, the club is competing in the DFB-Pokal, Franz Beckenbauer Supercup and the UEFA Champions League.

This is the first season since 2018–19 without midfielder Julian Brandt, who departed for Eredivisie side Ajax after the end of his contract.

== Players ==
=== First team squad ===
As of 1 September 2026

Note: Flags indicate national team as defined under FIFA eligibility rules; some limited exceptions apply. Players may hold more than one non-FIFA nationality.

No.	Pos.	Nation	Player
1	GK	SUI	Gregor Kobel
3	DF	GER	Waldemar Anton (third captain)
4	DF	GER	Nico Schlotterbeck (vice-captain)
5	DF	ALG	Ramy Bensebaini
7	MF	ENG	Jobe Bellingham
8	MF	GER	Felix Nmecha
9	FW	GUI	Serhou Guirassy
14	MF	GER	Maximilian Beier
17	MF	AUT	Carney Chukwuemeka
18	MF	ENG	Ethan Nwaneri (on loan from Arsenal)
19	MF	GRE	Konstantinos Karetsas
20	MF	AUT	Marcel Sabitzer
21	FW	POR	Fábio Silva
22	DF	FRA	Joane Gadou
23	DF	GER	Emre Can (captain)

No.	Pos.	Nation	Player
24	DF	SWE	Daniel Svensson
25	MF	NED	Joey Veerman
26	DF	NOR	Julian Ryerson
28	MF	ECU	Justin Lerma
30	GK	GER	Patrick Drewes
31	GK	GER	Silas Ostrzinski
33	GK	GER	Alexander Meyer
36	DF	BRA	Kauã Prates
39	DF	ITA	Filippo Mané
40	FW	ITA	Samuele Inácio
41	FW	USA	Mathis Albert
44	MF	LUX	Enzo dos Santos
45	MF	GRE	Giannis Konstantelias
48	MF	GER	Mussa Kaba
49	DF	ITA	Luca Reggiani

=== Out on loan ===
Note: Flags indicate national team as defined under FIFA eligibility rules; some limited exceptions apply. Players may hold more than one non-FIFA nationality.

No.	Pos.	Nation	Player
2	DF	BRA	Yan Couto (at Como until 30 June 2027)
32	GK	GER	Diant Ramaj (at Copenhagen until 30 June 2027)

No.	Pos.	Nation	Player
42	DF	GER	Almugera Kabar (at NEC until 30 June 2027)

== Transfers ==
=== In ===
No.	Pos.	Player	Transferred from	Fee	Date	Source
16	FW	(Belgium) Julien Duranville	(Switzerland) Basel	Loan return	1 July 2026	
37	FW	(United States) Cole Campbell	(Germany) TSG Hoffenheim	Loan return	1 July 2026	
38	MF	(Germany) Kjell Wätjen	(Germany) VfL Bochum	Loan return	1 July 2026	
—	GK	(Germany) Diant Ramaj	(Germany) 1. FC Heidenheim	Loan return	1 July 2026	
22	DF	(France) Joane Gadou	(Austria) Red Bull Salzburg	€19,500,000	1 July 2026	
28	MF	(Ecuador) Justin Lerma	(Ecuador) Independiente del Valle	€4,000,000	1 July 2026	
19	MF	(Greece) Konstantinos Karetsas	(Belgium) Genk	€30,000,000	3 August 2026	
36	DF	(Brazil) Kauã Prates	(Brazil) Cruzeiro	€7,000,000	12 August 2026	
45	MF	(Greece) Giannis Konstantelias	(Greece) PAOK	€26,000,000	17 August 2026	
25	MF	(Netherlands) Joey Veerman	(Netherlands) PSV	€22,000,000	18 August 2026	
18	MF	(England) Ethan Nwaneri	(England) Arsenal	Loan	1 September 2026	

=== Out ===
No.	Pos.	Player	Transferred to	Fee	Date	Source
6	MF	(Turkey) Salih Özcan	(Turkey) Beşiktaş	Free transfer	1 July 2026	
10	MF	(Germany) Julian Brandt	(Netherlands) Ajax	Free transfer	1 July 2026	
25	DF	(Germany) Niklas Süle	(Germany) SV Tiefenbach	Free transfer	1 July 2026	
16	FW	(Belgium) Julien Duranville	(France) Lyon	€5,000,000	2 July 2026	
37	FW	(United States) Cole Campbell	(Germany) SV Elversberg	€6,000,000	9 July 2026	
38	MF	(Germany) Kjell Wätjen	(Denmark) Midtjylland	€2,500,000	13 July 2026	
27	FW	(Germany) Karim Adeyemi	(Spain) Barcelona	€22,000,000	23 July 2026	
2	DF	(Brazil) Yan Couto	(Italy) Como	Loan	6 August 2026	
42	DF	(Germany) Almugera Kabar	(Netherlands) NEC	Loan	14 August 2026	
32	GK	(Germany) Diant Ramaj	(Denmark) Copenhagen	Loan	17 August 2026	
47	DF	(Algeria) Elias Benkara	(Germany) Greuther Fürth	Loan	28 August 2026	

== Friendlies ==
=== Pre-season ===
On 26 June 2026, it was announced that Borussia Dortmund would face Arsenal in the annual Emirates Cup.

18 July 2026 Friendly	Rot-Weiß Oberhausen	1−3	Borussia Dortmund	Oberhausen, Germany
17:00 CEST (UTC+2)	Kesim 5'; Winter (yellow card) 44'	Report	Lerma 45'; Guirassy 55'; Yamamoto 78'; Ritter (yellow card) 83'	Stadium: Niederrheinstadion; Attendance: 7,359; Referee: Thibaut Scheer

25 July 2026 Friendly	Fortuna Düsseldorf	2–1	Borussia Dortmund	Düsseldorf, Germany
13:00 CEST (UTC+2)	Schleusener 49'; Slimani 79'	Report	Albert 20'; Riedl (yellow card) 45+1'	Stadium: Merkur Spiel-Arena; Attendance: 23,300; Referee: Jonah Besong

29 July 2026 BVB Evonik Japan Tour	Cerezo Osaka	1–0	Borussia Dortmund	Osaka, Japan
21:00 JPT (UTC+9)	Sakuragawa 8'	Report	Ritter (yellow card) 89'	Stadium: Yodoko Sakura Stadium; Attendance: 25,000; Referee: Masuya Ueda (Japan)

1 August 2026 BVB Evonik Japan Tour	FC Tokyo	0–1	Borussia Dortmund	Tokyo, Japan
21:00 JPT (UTC+9)		Report	Ritter (yellow card) 31'; Silva 54'; Couto (yellow card) 78'	Stadium: Japan National Stadium; Attendance: 32,498; Referee: Koji Takasaki (Japan)

9 August 2026 Emirates Cup	Arsenal	2–3 (5–4 p)	Borussia Dortmund	London, England
14:00 BST (UTC+1)	Gabriel (yellow card) 45'; Nwaneri 54'; Gyökeres 69' (pen.)	Report	Inácio 7'; Karetsas 29'; Gadou 58'	Stadium: Emirates Stadium; Referee: Chris Kavanagh (England)
	Penalties
	Gabriel Jesus (penalty scored); Vieira (penalty scored); Hincapié (penalty scored); Martinelli (penalty scored); Nwaneri (penalty scored)		(penalty scored) Sabitzer; (penalty scored) Karetsas; (penalty scored) Yamamoto; (penalty missed) Albert; (penalty scored) Chukwuemeka

15 August 2026 Friendly	Borussia Dortmund	2–2	Roma	Dortmund, Germany
17:30 CEST (UTC+2)	Ryerson 12'; Guirassy 28'	Report	Dybala 4', (yellow card) 65'; Cristante 9'; Rensch (yellow card) 13'	Stadium: Signal Iduna Park; Attendance: 81,365; Referee: Robin Braun (Germany)

== Competitions ==
=== Overall record ===
Competition	First match	Last match	Starting round	Final position	Record							
Competition	First match	Last match	Starting round	Final position	Pld	W	D	L	GF	GA	GD	Win %
Bundesliga	29 August 2026	22 May 2027	Matchday 1	TBD	10	7	3	0	17	7	+10	70.00
DFB-Pokal	1 September 2026	TBD	First round	TBD	2	2	0	0	8	2	+6	100.00
Franz Beckenbauer Supercup	22 August 2026		Final	Runners-up	1	0	0	1	1	2	−1	0.00
UEFA Champions League	8 September 2026	TBD	League phase	TBD	4	3	0	1	7	5	+2	75.00
Total					17	12	3	2	33	16	+17	70.59

Last updated: 21 November 2026
Source: Soccerway

=== Bundesliga ===
==== League table ====
Pos	Team	Pld	W	D	L	GF	GA	GD	Pts	Qualification or relegation
1	Borussia Dortmund	10	7	3	0	17	7	+10	24	Qualification for the Champions League league phase
2	Bayern Munich	10	6	4	0	30	10	+20	22	Qualification for the Champions League league phase
3	SC Freiburg	10	7	1	2	21	10	+11	22	Qualification for the Champions League league phase
4	RB Leipzig	10	7	0	3	32	14	+18	21	Qualification for the Champions League league phase
5	Bayer Leverkusen	10	6	1	3	24	17	+7	19	Qualification for the Europa League league phase (Note: The 2026–27 DFB-Pokal winners also qualify for the Europa League league stage (or the sixth-placed team if the DFB-Pokal winners finish in the top five of the Bundesliga). If the DFB-Pokal winners finish in the top six of the Bundesliga, the Conference League spot will be passed to the seventh-placed team.)

Updated to match(es) played on 21 November 2026. Source: Bundesliga
Rules for classification: 1) Points; 2) Goal difference; 3) Goals scored; 4) Head-to-head aggregate results; 5) Head-to-head away goals scored; 6) Away goals scored; 7) Play-off at neutral site.
(Rules 4–6 only apply after all home-and-away matches have been played between the tied teams. Rule 7 only applies after the completion of the season.)

==== Results summary ====
Overall								Home						Away					
Pld	W	D	L	GF	GA	GD	Pts	W	D	L	GF	GA	GD	W	D	L	GF	GA	GD
10	7	3	0	17	7	+10	24	4	1	0	10	3	+7	3	2	0	7	4	+3

Last updated: 21 November 2026.
Source: DFB

==== Results by round ====
Round	1	2	3	4	5	6	7	8	9	10	11	12	13	14	15	16	17	18	19	20	21	22	23	24	25	26	27	28	29	30	31	32	33	34
Ground	H	A	H	A	H	A	H	A	H	A	H	A	H	A	H	A	H	A	H	A	H	A	H	A	H	A	H	A	H	A	H	A	H	A
Result	W	W	W	W	D	D	W	D	W	W																								
Position	5	3	2	1	2	2	2	2	2	1																								
Points	3	6	9	12	13	14	17	18	21	24																								

Updated to match(es) played on 21 November 2026. Source: DFB
A = Away; H = Home; W = Win; D = Draw; L = Loss

==== Matches ====
The league fixtures were released on 2 July 2026.

29 August 2026 1	Borussia Dortmund	2–0	Hamburger SV	Dortmund
18:30 CEST (UTC+2)	Guirassy 9'; Konstantelias 45+1'; Ryerson (yellow card) 58'; Inácio (red card) 77'; Svensson (yellow card) 85'	Report	Sambi Lokonga (yellow card) 21'	Stadium: Signal Iduna Park; Attendance: 81,365; Referee: Felix Zwayer

5 September 2026 2	TSG Hoffenheim	2–3	Borussia Dortmund	Sinsheim
15:30 CEST (UTC+2)	Kabak (yellow card) 40'; Avdullahu 45'; Hajdari (yellow card) 45+3'; Lemperle 54'; Burger (yellow card) 63'; Kramarić (yellow card) 80'	Report	Guirassy 61'; Silva 66'; Reggiani (yellow card) 76'; Beier (yellow card) 78'; Hajdari 86' (o.g.)	Stadium: Rhein-Neckar-Arena; Attendance: 30,150; Referee: Matthias Jöllenbeck

12 September 2026 3	Borussia Dortmund	3–0	SC Paderborn	Dortmund
15:30 CEST (UTC+2)	Silva 5'; Bellingham (yellow card) 66'; Nmecha 80', 89'	Report	Ulrich (yellow card) 39'	Stadium: Signal Iduna Park; Attendance: 81,365; Referee: Harm Osmers

19 September 2026 4	VfB Stuttgart	0–1	Borussia Dortmund	Stuttgart
18:30 CEST (UTC+2)	Demirović (yellow card) 13'; Stiller (yellow card) 17'	Report	Schlotterbeck (yellow card) 32'; Veerman (yellow card) 47'; Gadou (yellow card) 57'; Beier 70'; Bellingham (yellow card) 81'; Ryerson (yellow card) 82'	Stadium: MHPArena; Attendance: 60,000; Referee: Tobias Stieler

9 October 2026 5	Borussia Dortmund	2–2	Werder Bremen	Dortmund
20:30 CEST (UTC+2)	Svensson 80'; Schlotterbeck 85'; Veerman (yellow card) 90+2'; Nmecha (yellow card) 90+4'	Report	Reis 88'; Stalmach (yellow card) 90'; Füllkrug 90+2'	Stadium: Signal Iduna Park; Attendance: 81,365; Referee: Christian Dingert

17 October 2026 6	Union Berlin	0–0	Borussia Dortmund	Berlin
15:30 CEST (UTC+2)	Haberer (yellow card) 33'; Rothe (yellow card) 35'; Skarke (yellow card) 63'	Report	Nwaneri (yellow card) 1'; Anton (yellow card) 8'; Guirassy (yellow card) 14'	Stadium: Stadion An der Alten Försterei; Attendance: 22,012; Referee: Daniel Schlager

24 October 2026 7	Borussia Dortmund	1–0	Eintracht Frankfurt	Dortmund
18:30 CEST (UTC+2)	Beier 80'	Report	Collins (yellow card) 58'; Chaïbi (yellow card) 63'	Stadium: Signal Iduna Park; Attendance: 81,365; Referee: Sven Jablonski

31 October 2026 8	Bayern Munich	2–2	Borussia Dortmund	Munich
18:30 CET (UTC+1)	Laimer 38', (yellow card) 74'; Stanišić (yellow card) 53'; Kane (penalty missed) 56'; Upamecano 66'	Report	Bellingham (yellow card) 6'; Guirassy 60'; Silva 89'	Stadium: Allianz Arena; Attendance: 75,000; Referee: Tobias Stieler

7 November 2026 9	Borussia Dortmund	2–1	SV Elversberg	Dortmund
15:30 CET (UTC+1)	Nmecha (yellow card) 22', (goal) 55', 71'; Silva (yellow card) 60'; Anton (yellow card) 76'	Report	Günther (yellow card) 65'; Futkeu 81'	Stadium: Signal Iduna Park; Attendance: 81,365; Referee: Harm Osmers

21 November 2026 10	Borussia Mönchengladbach	0–1	Borussia Dortmund	Mönchengladbach
15:30 CET (UTC+1)	Uno (yellow card) 32'; Diks (yellow card) 72'	Report	Gadou (yellow card) 16'; Nmecha 80'	Stadium: Borussia-Park; Attendance: 54,546; Referee: Robert Hartmann

29 November 2026 11	Borussia Dortmund	v	Bayer Leverkusen	Dortmund
19:30 CET (UTC+1)		Report		Stadium: Signal Iduna Park

6 December 2026 12	Schalke 04	v	Borussia Dortmund	Gelsenkirchen
15:30 CET (UTC+1)		Report		Stadium: Veltins-Arena

12 December 2026 13	Borussia Dortmund	v	FC Augsburg	Dortmund
15:30 CET (UTC+1)		Report		Stadium: Signal Iduna Park

19 December 2026 14	RB Leipzig	v	Borussia Dortmund	Leipzig
18:30 CET (UTC+1)		Report		Stadium: Red Bull Arena

8 January 2027 15	Borussia Dortmund	v	Mainz 05	Dortmund
20:30 CET (UTC+1)		Report		Stadium: Signal Iduna Park

12 January 2027 16	1. FC Köln	v	Borussia Dortmund	Cologne
20:30 CET (UTC+1)		Report		Stadium: RheinEnergieStadion

16 January 2027 17	Borussia Dortmund	v	SC Freiburg	Dortmund
15:30 CET (UTC+1)		Report		Stadium: Signal Iduna Park

23 January 2027 18	Hamburger SV	v	Borussia Dortmund	Hamburg
18:30 CET (UTC+1)		Report		Stadium: Volksparkstadion

29–31 January 2027 19	Borussia Dortmund	v	TSG Hoffenheim	Dortmund
--:-- CET (UTC+1)		Report		Stadium: Signal Iduna Park

5–7 February 2027 20	SC Paderborn	v	Borussia Dortmund	Paderborn
--:-- CET (UTC+1)		Report		Stadium: Home Deluxe Arena

12–14 February 2027 21	Borussia Dortmund	v	VfB Stuttgart	Dortmund
--:-- CET (UTC+1)		Report		Stadium: Signal Iduna Park

19–21 February 2027 22	Werder Bremen	v	Borussia Dortmund	Bremen
--:-- CET (UTC+1)		Report		Stadium: Weserstadion

26–28 February 2027 23	Borussia Dortmund	v	Union Berlin	Dortmund
--:-- CET (UTC+1)		Report		Stadium: Signal Iduna Park

2–4 March 2027 24	Eintracht Frankfurt	v	Borussia Dortmund	Frankfurt
--:-- CET (UTC+1)		Report		Stadium: Deutsche Bank Park

5–7 March 2027 25	Borussia Dortmund	v	Bayern Munich	Dortmund
--:-- CET (UTC+1)		Report		Stadium: Signal Iduna Park

12–14 March 2027 26	SV Elversberg	v	Borussia Dortmund	Spiesen-Elversberg
--:-- CET (UTC+1)		Report		Stadium: Ursapharm-Arena

19–21 March 2027 27	Borussia Dortmund	v	Borussia Mönchengladbach	Dortmund
--:-- CET (UTC+1)		Report		Stadium: Signal Iduna Park

2–4 April 2027 28	Bayer Leverkusen	v	Borussia Dortmund	Leverkusen
--:-- CEST (UTC+2)		Report		Stadium: BayArena

9–11 April 2027 29	Borussia Dortmund	v	Schalke 04	Dortmund
--:-- CEST (UTC+2)		Report		Stadium: Signal Iduna Park

16–18 April 2027 30	FC Augsburg	v	Borussia Dortmund	Augsburg
--:-- CEST (UTC+2)		Report		Stadium: WWK Arena

23–25 April 2027 31	Borussia Dortmund	v	RB Leipzig	Dortmund
--:-- CEST (UTC+2)		Report		Stadium: Signal Iduna Park

7–9 May 2027 32	Mainz 05	v	Borussia Dortmund	Mainz
--:-- CEST (UTC+2)		Report		Stadium: Mewa Arena

14–16 May 2027 33	Borussia Dortmund	v	1. FC Köln	Dortmund
--:-- CEST (UTC+2)		Report		Stadium: Signal Iduna Park

22 May 2027 34	SC Freiburg	v	Borussia Dortmund	Freiburg
15:30 CEST (UTC+2)		Report		Stadium: Europa-Park Stadion

=== DFB-Pokal ===
The first round draw was held on 6 June 2026.

1 September 2026 First round	Hamburg-Eimsbütteler BC	0–5	Borussia Dortmund	Hamburg
20:45 CEST (UTC+2)	Nawaz (yellow card) 72'	Report	Wrede 33' (o.g.); Svensson 36'; Inácio 41', 45+2'; Silva 59'	Stadium: Volksparkstadion; Attendance: 45,917; Referee: Tom Bauer

27 October 2026 Second round	Borussia Dortmund	3–2	Werder Bremen	Dortmund
20:45 CET (UTC+1)	Guirassy 6'; Chukwuemeka 17'; Veerman (yellow card) 49'; Ryerson (yellow card) 64'; Sabitzer 90+3'	Report	Pieper (yellow card) 24'; Arthur (yellow card) 57'; Füllkrug 65' (pen.), 68'	Stadium: Signal Iduna Park; Attendance: 81,365; Referee: Robert Schröder

2 December 2026 Round of 16	Eintracht Frankfurt	v	Borussia Dortmund	Frankfurt
20:45 CET (UTC+1)		Report		Stadium: Deutsche Bank Park

=== Franz Beckenbauer Supercup ===
22 August 2026 Final	Borussia Dortmund	1–2	Bayern Munich	Dortmund
20:30 CEST	Silva 75'; Bensebaini (red card) 90'	Report	Brown 28'; Díaz (yellow card) 45+1'; Olise 45+1'	Stadium: Signal Iduna Park; Attendance: 81,365; Referee: Daniel Schlager

=== UEFA Champions League ===
==== League phase ====
The league phase draw was held on 27 August 2026.

Pos	Team	Pld	W	D	L	GF	GA	GD	Pts	Qualification
10	(Portugal) Sporting CP	4	3	0	1	8	4	+4	9	Advance to knockout phase play-offs (seeded)
11	(Spain) Real Betis	4	3	0	1	8	6	+2	9	Advance to knockout phase play-offs (seeded)
12	(Germany) Borussia Dortmund	4	3	0	1	7	5	+2	9	Advance to knockout phase play-offs (seeded)
13	(Germany) Bayern Munich	4	2	2	0	12	5	+7	8	Advance to knockout phase play-offs (seeded)
14	(Germany) VfB Stuttgart	4	2	1	1	7	4	+3	7	Advance to knockout phase play-offs (seeded)

Updated to match(es) played on 4 November 2026. Source: UEFA
Rules for classification: League phase tiebreakers

Round	1	2	3	4	5	6	7	8
Ground	H	A	A	H	A	H	A	H
Result	W	L	W	W				
Position	12	18	13	12				
Points	3	3	6	9				

Updated to match(es) played on 4 November 2026. Source: UEFA
A = Away; H = Home; W = Win; D = Draw; L = Loss

8 September 2026 1	Borussia Dortmund (Germany)	3–2	(Spain) Villarreal	Dortmund, Germany
21:00 CEST (UTC+2)	Anton (yellow card) 38'; Veiga 53' (o.g.); Guirassy 80', 85' (pen.)	Report	Navarro (yellow card) 38'; Cardona (yellow card) 42'; Mouriño 66', (yellow card) 84'; Guirassy 90+3' (o.g.)	Stadium: Westfalenstadion; Attendance: 77,500; Referee: Simone Sozza (Italy)

14 October 2026 2	Bodø/Glimt (Norway)	1–0	(Germany) Borussia Dortmund	Bodø, Norway
21:00 CEST (UTC+2)	Sjøvold 52'	Report	Gadou (yellow card) 13'; Silva (yellow card) 25'	Stadium: Aspmyra Stadion; Attendance: 7,885; Referee: Urs Schnyder (Switzerland)

20 October 2026 3	Sabah (Azerbaijan)	1–2	(Germany) Borussia Dortmund	Baku, Azerbaijan
20:45 AZT (UTC+4)	Solvet (yellow card) 22'; McCarthy 39', (yellow card) 57'; Lepinjica (yellow card) 49'; Zedadka (yellow card) 89'	Report	Guirassy 10', 53'	Stadium: Olympic Stadium; Attendance: 47,221; Referee: Javier Alberola Rojas (Spain)
Note: The match was played at Olympic Stadium in Baku, instead of Sabah's regular stadium, Bank Respublika Arena in Masazir, which did not meet UEFA requirements.

4 November 2026 4	Borussia Dortmund (Germany)	2–1	(Spain) Real Betis	Dortmund, Germany
21:00 CET (UTC+1)	Ryerson (yellow card) 38'; Bensebaini (yellow card) 45+4'; Silva 49'; Karetsas 72'; Veerman (yellow card) 78'; Bellingham (yellow card) 79'	Report	Natan (yellow card) 44'; Gómez (yellow card) 64'; Ruibal 67'; Ortiz (yellow card) 88'; Isco (yellow card) 90+3'	Stadium: Westfalenstadion; Attendance: 81,365; Referee: Serdar Gözübüyük (Netherlands)

24 November 2026 5	Arsenal (England)	v	(Germany) Borussia Dortmund	London, England
20:00 GMT (UTC±0)		Report		Stadium: Emirates Stadium

9 December 2026 6	Borussia Dortmund (Germany)	v	(Italy) Inter Milan	Dortmund, Germany
21:00 CET (UTC+1)		Report		Stadium: Westfalenstadion

19 January 2027 7	Aston Villa (England)	v	(Germany) Borussia Dortmund	Birmingham, England
20:00 GMT (UTC±0)		Report		Stadium: Villa Park

27 January 2027 8	Borussia Dortmund (Germany)	v	(Greece) AEK Athens	Dortmund, Germany
21:00 CET (UTC+1)		Report		Stadium: Westfalenstadion

== Statistics ==
=== Appearances and goals ===
No.	Pos	Nat	Player	Total		Bundesliga		DFB-Pokal		Franz Beckenbauer Supercup		Champions League	
No.	Pos	Nat	Player	Apps	Goals	Apps	Goals	Apps	Goals	Apps	Goals	Apps	Goals
Goalkeepers
1	GK	(Switzerland) SUI	Gregor Kobel	15	0	9	0	1	0	1	0	4	0
30	GK	(Germany) GER	Patrick Drewes	0	0	0	0	0	0	0	0	0	0
31	GK	(Germany) GER	Silas Ostrzinski	0	0	0	0	0	0	0	0	0	0
33	GK	(Germany) GER	Alexander Meyer	1	0	0	0	1	0	0	0	0	0
Defenders
3	DF	(Germany) GER	Waldemar Anton	16	0	9	0	2	0	1	0	4	0
4	DF	(Germany) GER	Nico Schlotterbeck	10	1	7	1	1	0	0	0	2	0
5	DF	(Algeria) ALG	Ramy Bensebaini	8	0	1+3	0	0	0	1	0	3	0
22	DF	(France) FRA	Joane Gadou	15	0	8+1	0	1	0	1	0	2+2	0
23	DF	(Germany) GER	Emre Can	0	0	0	0	0	0	0	0	0	0
24	DF	(Sweden) SWE	Daniel Svensson	16	2	9	1	1+1	1	1	0	4	0
26	DF	(Norway) NOR	Julian Ryerson	15	0	6+2	0	2	0	1	0	3+1	0
36	DF	(Brazil) BRA	Kauã Prates	3	0	0+1	0	0+1	0	0	0	0+1	0
39	DF	(Italy) ITA	Filippo Mané	3	0	1+1	0	1	0	0	0	0	0
49	DF	(Italy) ITA	Luca Reggiani	2	0	0+1	0	0+1	0	0	0	0	0
Midfielders
7	MF	(England) ENG	Jobe Bellingham	15	0	7+2	0	1	0	1	0	2+2	0
8	MF	(Germany) GER	Felix Nmecha	16	4	8+1	4	2	0	1	0	3+1	0
14	MF	(Germany) GER	Maximilian Beier	16	2	6+3	2	1+1	0	0+1	0	2+2	0
17	MF	(Austria) AUT	Carney Chukwuemeka	10	1	2+2	0	1+1	1	0	0	1+3	0
18	MF	(England) ENG	Ethan Nwaneri	12	0	4+3	0	0+1	0	0	0	0+4	0
19	MF	(Greece) GRE	Konstantinos Karetsas	12	1	3+4	0	0+1	0	1	0	2+1	1
20	MF	(Austria) AUT	Marcel Sabitzer	13	1	2+6	0	1+1	1	0+1	0	1+1	0
25	MF	(Netherlands) NED	Joey Veerman	15	0	5+3	0	2	0	0+1	0	4	0
28	MF	(Ecuador) ECU	Justin Lerma	0	0	0	0	0	0	0	0	0	0
44	MF	(Luxembourg) LUX	Enzo dos Santos	0	0	0	0	0	0	0	0	0	0
45	MF	(Greece) GRE	Giannis Konstantelias	2	1	1	1	0	0	0+1	0	0	0
48	MF	(Germany) GER	Mussa Kaba	0	0	0	0	0	0	0	0	0	0
Forwards
9	FW	(Guinea) GUI	Serhou Guirassy	14	8	8	3	1	1	1	0	3+1	4
21	FW	(Portugal) POR	Fábio Silva	15	6	3+5	3	1+1	1	0+1	1	3+1	1
40	FW	(Italy) ITA	Samuele Inacio	5	2	0+2	0	1	2	1	0	1	0
41	FW	(United States) USA	Mathis Albert	2	0	0+1	0	1	0	0	0	0	0
Players transferred/loaned out during the season

Last updated: 7 November 2026
Source: Competitions

=== Goalscorers ===
Rank	Pos.	No.	Nat.	Player	Bundesliga	DFB-Pokal	Franz Beckenbauer Supercup	Champions League	Total
1	FW	9	(Guinea)	Serhou Guirassy	3	1	0	4	8
2	FW	21	(Portugal)	Fábio Silva	3	1	1	1	6
3	MF	8	(Germany)	Felix Nmecha	4	0	0	0	4
4	MF	14	(Germany)	Maximilian Beier	2	0	0	0	2
4	DF	24	(Sweden)	Daniel Svensson	1	1	0	0	2
4	FW	40	(Italy)	Samuele Inácio	0	2	0	0	2
7	DF	4	(Germany)	Nico Schlotterbeck	1	0	0	0	1
7	MF	17	(Austria)	Carney Chukwuemeka	0	1	0	0	1
7	MF	19	(Greece)	Konstantinos Karetsas	0	0	0	1	1
7	MF	20	(Austria)	Marcel Sabitzer	0	1	0	0	1
7	MF	45	(Greece)	Giannis Konstantelias	1	0	0	0	1
Own goals					1	1	0	1	3
Totals					16	8	1	7	32

=== Assists ===
Rank	Pos.	No.	Nat.	Player	Bundesliga	DFB-Pokal	Franz Beckenbauer Supercup	Champions League	Total
1	FW	21	(Portugal)	Fábio Silva	2	0	0	2	4
2	MF	7	(England)	Jobe Bellingham	2	1	0	0	3
2	MF	14	(Germany)	Maximilian Beier	3	0	0	0	3
2	MF	25	(Netherlands)	Joey Veerman	1	1	0	1	3
2	DF	26	(Norway)	Julian Ryerson	0	3	0	0	3
6	FW	9	(Guinea)	Serhou Guirassy	2	0	0	0	2
6	MF	19	(Greece)	Konstantinos Karetsas	2	0	0	0	2
6	MF	20	(Austria)	Marcel Sabitzer	1	1	0	0	2
9	DF	3	(Germany)	Waldemar Anton	1	0	0	0	1
9	MF	17	(Austria)	Carney Chukwuemeka	1	0	0	0	1
9	DF	24	(Sweden)	Daniel Svensson	0	0	1	0	1
Totals					15	6	1	3	25
