= Chris N'Goyos =

Footballer (born 1992)

Personal information
- Full name: Chris Igor N'Goyos
- Date of birth: 18 August 1992 (age 34)
- Place of birth: Paris, France
- Height: 1.80 m (5 ft 11 in)
- Position: Striker

Senior career*
Years	Team	Apps	(Gls)
2011–2012	Tours B	27	(8)
2012–2013	Orléans	4	(2)
2013–2014	RFC Huy	11	(2)
2014–2015	Saint-Pryvé Saint-Hilaire	20	(10)
2015–2016	Chartres	16	(3)
2016–2018	Bourges 18	27	(2)
2018	US Châteauneuf-sur-Loire	3	(0)

International career
2013–2014	Central African Republic	4	(0)
- * Club domestic league appearances and goals as of 21:14, 2 May 2020 (UTC)

Chris Igor N'Goyos (born 18 August 1992) is a professional footballer who plays as a striker. Born in France, he played for the Central African Republic national team.

== Career ==
Born in Paris, N'Goyos has played for Tours B, Orléans, RFC Huy, Saint-Pryvé Saint-Hilaire, Chartres, Bourges 18, and US Châteauneuf-sur-Loire.

== International career ==
N'Goyos made his international debut for the Central African Republic in 2013.
