= Mfundo Nsele =

South African footballer

Personal information
- Date of birth: 11 February 1992 (age 34)
- Place of birth: Thokozani, Pietermaritzburg
- Position: Midfielder

Team information
- Current team: African Warriors F.C.
- Number: 13

Youth career
- Maritzburg City

Senior career*
Years	Team	Apps	(Gls)
2007–2010	Lamontville Golden Arrows	47	(2)
2010–2012	Bloemfontein Celtic	45	(4)
2012–2014	AmaZulu	23	(2)
2014–2015	Royal Eagles F.C.	14	(2)
2015–2016	Thanda Royal Zulu F.C.	8	(1)
2015–2016	African Warriors F.C.	9	(2)
- * Club domestic league appearances and goals

Mfundo Nsele is a midfielder who plays for African Warriors F.C. in the South African Premier Soccer League.
