= Ibrahim Olanrewaju =

Nigerian footballer

Personal information
- Full name: Ibrahim Olanrewaju Obayomi
- Date of birth: 9 September 1992 (age 34)
- Place of birth: Lagos, Nigeria
- Height: 1.90 m (6 ft 3 in)
- Position: Forward

Team information
- Current team: Marítimo B
- Number: 33

Senior career*
Years	Team	Apps	(Gls)
2009–2011	Crown		
2011–2012	Marítimo	6	(1)
2011–	Marítimo B	75	(4)
- * Club domestic league appearances and goals as of 30 October 2016

Ibrahim Olanrewaju Obayomi (born 9 September 1992) is a Nigerian football player who plays for Marítimo B.

== Club career ==
He made his Primeira Liga debut for Marítimo on 21 August 2011 as a second-half substitute in a 0–2 loss to Braga.
