= Jil Strüngmann =

German association football player

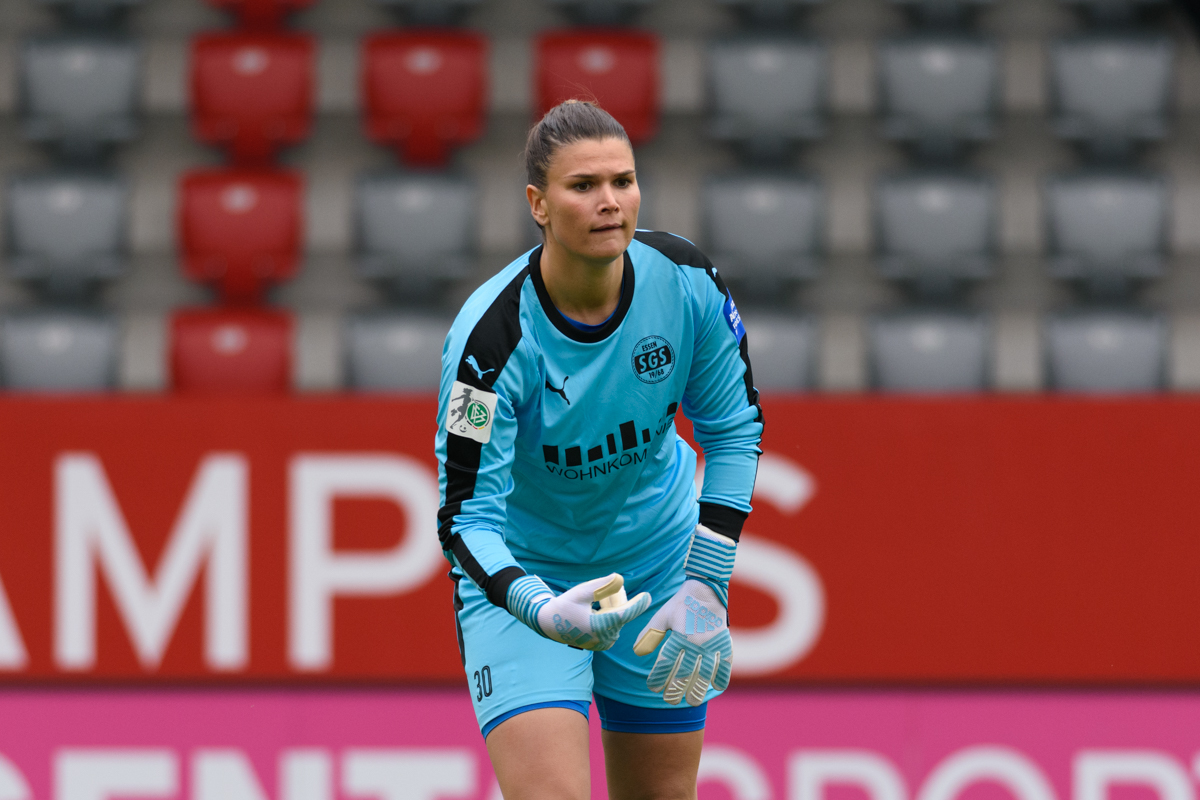

Personal information
- Date of birth: 9 July 1992 (age 33)
- Place of birth: Oberhausen, Germany
- Height: 1.80 m (5 ft 11 in)
- Position: Goalkeeper

Senior career*
Years	Team	Apps	(Gls)
2009–2013	SGS Essen II	17	(0)
2010–2013	SGS Essen	1	(0)
2014–2018	SGS Essen II	11	(0)
2014–2018	SGS Essen	1	(0)
- * Club domestic league appearances and goals

Jil Strüngmann (born 9 July 1992) is a retired former German footballer who played for SGS Essen.

== Post career ==
Strüngmann since retiring from football has been the goalkeeper coach of SV Budberg's U17 women's team since 2020.
