= Matias Caseras =

Uruguayan footballer (born 1992)

Personal information
- Date of birth: March 20, 1992 (age 34)
- Place of birth: Colonia del Sacramento, Uruguay
- Height: 1.68 m (5 ft 6 in)
- Position: Midfielder

Team information
- Current team: Plaza Colonia
- Number: 5

Youth career
- Nacional

Senior career*
Years	Team	Apps	(Gls)
2013–	Plaza Colonia	121	(4)
2018	→ Kyoto Sanga (loan)	2	(0)
- * Club domestic league appearances and goals as of 7 October 2019

Matias Caseras (born March 20, 1992) is a Uruguayan professional footballer born in Colonia del Sacramento, who plays as a midfielder for Plaza Colonia.

== Career ==
After starting with Club Nacional U19, he signed with Plaza Colonia in 2011.

On 1 January 2018 he was loaned to Japanese football club Kyoto Sanga until 11 July 2018, where he returned back to Plaza Colonia.

On 1 April 2021 Caseras was transferred to Villa Teresa.

On 17 February he was transferred from Villa Teresa to Buhos ULVR FC until his departure on 1 January 2023.

Currently Caseras is without a club.
