= Akil Grier =

Footballer (born 1992)

Personal information
- Full name: Akil Akeme Anthony Jumaane Grier
- Date of birth: 15 September 1992 (age 34)
- Place of birth: Birmingham, England
- Position: Midfielder

Senior career*
Years	Team	Apps	(Gls)
2011–2012	West Bromwich Albion	0	(0)
2012	Halesowen Town	2	(0)
2012	Östersund		
2012–2013	Hednesford Town	0	(0)
2015	Stourbridge (triallist)	0	(0)
2016	Coleshill Town		
2017–2018	Radcliffe		

International career
2011–2012	Saint Kitts and Nevis	2	(0)
- * Club domestic league appearances and goals

Akil Akeme Anthony Jumaane Grier (born 15 September 1992) is a former professional footballer who played as a midfielder. Born in England, he represented Saint Kitts and Nevis at international level.

== Early and personal life ==
Born in Birmingham, England, Grier attended Aston Manor Academy.

== Club career ==
Grier played for West Bromwich Albion, Halesowen Town, Östersund, Hednesford Town, Stourbridge, Coleshill Town and Radcliffe.

At Stourbridge he made one Worcestershire Senior Cup appearance in July 2015 as a triallist.

He signed for Coleshill Town in November 2016.

== International career ==
Grier made his international debut for Saint Kitts and Nevis in 2011, and has appeared in FIFA World Cup qualifying matches.

== Later life ==
In February 2019, Grier was sentenced to five years in prison for rape.
