= Oliver Mohr =

Austrian footballer

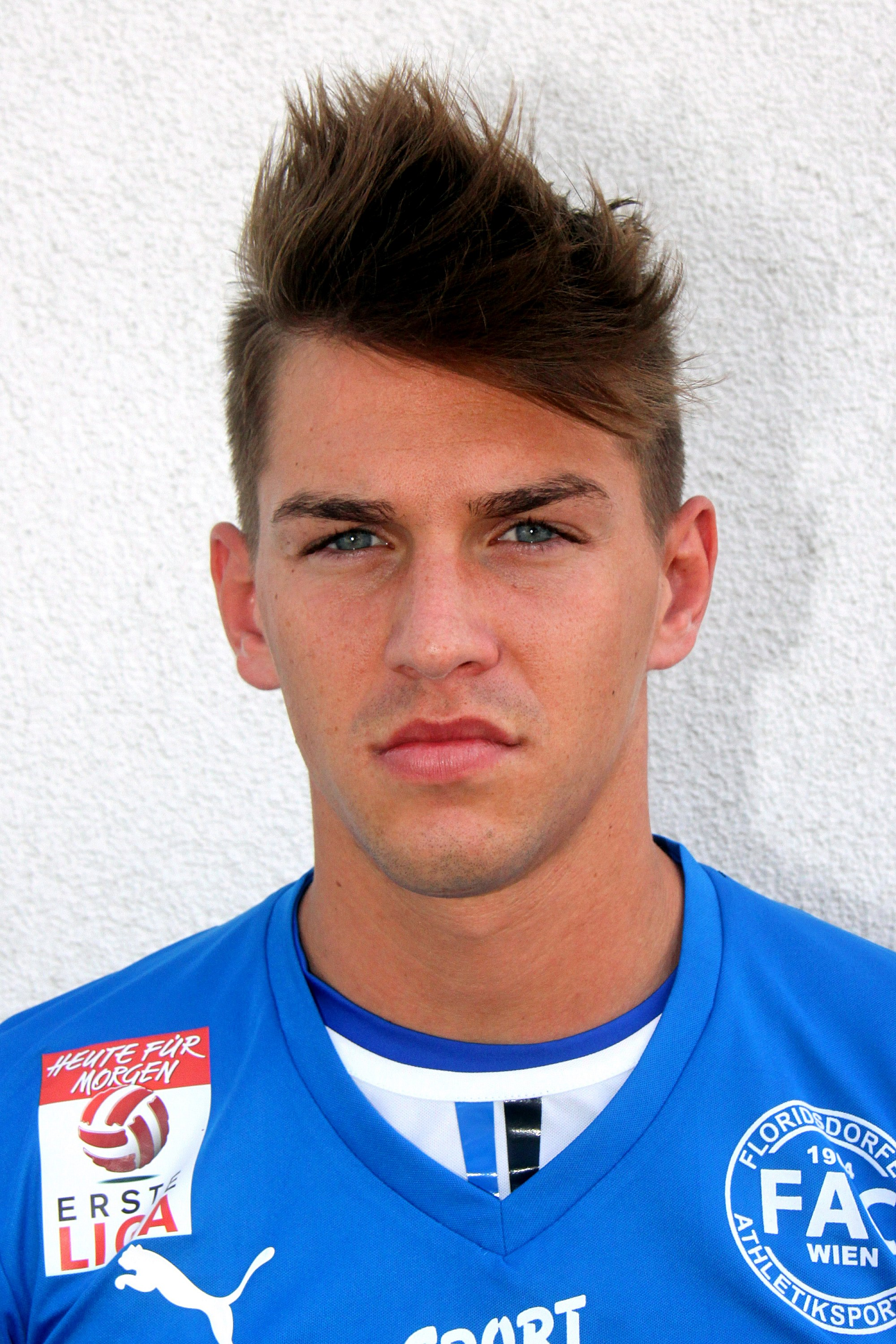
- Oliver Mohr in 2014

Personal information
- Date of birth: January 23, 1992 (age 34)
- Place of birth: Wien, Austria
- Height: 1.79 m (5 ft 10 in)
- Positions: Left back; centre back; defensive midfielder

Team information
- Current team: FCM Traiskirchen
- Number: 8

Youth career
- 1999–2009: Rapid Wien

Senior career*
Years	Team	Apps	(Gls)
2009–2013	Rapid Wien II	43	(0)
2011–2012	→ Floridsdorfer AC (loan)	36	(0)
2012	→ SV Horn (loan)	9	(0)
2013	→ Floridsdorfer AC (loan)	6	(0)
2013–2016	Floridsdorfer AC	46	(1)
2016–2018	FCM Traiskirchen	43	(0)
2018–2020	SV Stripfing	44	(1)
2020–	FCM Traiskirchen	9	(3)

International career
2008	Austria U17	1	(0)
- * Club domestic league appearances and goals as of 01:19, 17 January 2021 (UTC)

Oliver Mohr (born January 23, 1992) is an Austrian footballer who currently plays as a defender for FCM Traiskirchen.
