= Issa Issa =

Footballer (born 1984)

Personal information
- Full name: Issam Al-Edrissi
- Date of birth: 12 September 1984 (age 42)
- Place of birth: Beirut, Lebanon
- Height: 1.85 m (6 ft 1 in)
- Position: Midfielder

Team information
- Current team: VfB Frohnhausen
- Number: 20

Youth career
- 1992–1994: Schwarz-Weiss Essen
- 1994–2000: FC Schalke 04
- 2000–2001: Rot-Weiss Essen
- 2001–2003: Borussia Dortmund

Senior career*
Years	Team	Apps	(Gls)
2003–2005	Borussia Dortmund II	44	(6)
2006–2008	SV Lippstadt 08	78	(25)
2008–2009	Hammer SpVg	31	(4)
2010	SV Meppen	5	(0)
2010–2011	SG Wattenscheid 09	30	(10)
2011–2012	Sportfreunde Siegen	32	(4)
2012–2014	KFC Uerdingen 05	73	(37)
2015	1. FC Bocholt	3	(0)
2016	FSV Duisburg	16	(6)
2016–2018	ASV Wuppertal	55	(61)
2018–	VfB Frohnhausen	88	(24)

International career
2004	Lebanon	3	(0)
- * Club domestic league appearances and goals as of 11 December 2022

Issam Al-Edrissi (Arabic: عصام الإدريسي; born 12 September 1984), commonly known as Issa Issa (Arabic: عيسى عيسى), is a footballer who plays as a midfielder for German club VfB Frohnhausen. Born in Lebanon, Issa moved to Germany at an early age; he represented Lebanon internationally.

== Club career ==
Issa began his career 1992 in Germany, at Schwarz-Weiss Essen's youth side, before joining local rivals FC Schalke 04 in 1994. Six years later, he was scouted by Rot-Weiss Essen. Issa played in the U19s, and was promoted to the first team in the winter season.

After his first professional season for Rot-Weiss Essen, Issa joined Borussia Dortmund II for €150,000. He scored six goals in 44 appearances for Borussia Dortmund II in four years, before moving to SV Lippstadt 08 in 2006, where he scored 25 goals in 78 games. In 2008, Issa signed for Hammer SpVg, where he scored four goals in 31 matches. He was released one year later, and signed for SV Meppen after six months without a club, on 26 January 2010. After half a season, Issa signed in summer 2010 for SG Wattenscheid 09.

== International career ==
Issa represented the Lebanon national team at international level, playing three matches in 2004.

== Personal life ==
Issa's younger brother Khaled currently plays for Rot-Weiss Essen U17, and presented formerly the youth of NK Croatia Essen and Schwarz-Weiss Essen.
