= Mahatma Gandhi (footballer) =

Brazilian footballer (born 1992)

Personal information
- Full name: Mahatma Gandhi Heberpio Mattos Pires
- Date of birth: 18 February 1992 (age 34)
- Place of birth: Goiânia, Goiás, Brazil
- Height: 1.79 m (5 ft 10 in)
- Position: Defender

Senior career*
Years	Team	Apps	(Gls)
2011–2017	Atlético Goianiense	11	(0)
2016	→ Trindade (loan)	1	(0)
2016	→ Goiânia (loan)	4	(0)
2017	→ Iporá (loan)	0	(0)
Total		16	(0)
- * Club domestic league appearances and goals

Mahatma Gandhi Heberpio Mattos Pires (born 18 February 1992), is a Brazilian former professional footballer who played as a defender.

== Club career ==
The name 'Mahatma Gandhi' was derived from the Indian political ethicist Mahatma Gandhi. Gandhi's parents were inspired by the Indian leader's philosophy of non-violence and named their son after him.

In 2011, Gandhi joined Atlético Clube Goianiense. His debut season in the Serie A came in 2011, but he spent most of his time on the bench. He made seven Serie A appearances in 2012. In 2013, he played four matches for Serie B, but did not get a chance to play in 2014. He was part of the 2014 Campeonato Goiano winning team, where he made five appearances in the state league.

On December 1, 2017, he played his last match for Goiânia and retired from professional football.
