= Mory-Fallo Keïta =

Belgian-Guinean footballer (born 1992)

Mory Keïta
- Keïta with Olympic Charleroi

Personal information
- Full name: Mory-Fallo Keïta
- Date of birth: 13 December 1992 (age 33)
- Place of birth: Conakry, Guinea
- Height: 1.90 m (6 ft 3 in)
- Position: Forward

Youth career
- 2002–2005: FC Boly Coleah
- 2005–2006: Elephants de Coleah
- 2006–2007: Baraka Djoma SSG
- 2007–2010: Sporting Charleroi

Senior career*
Years	Team	Apps	(Gls)
2010–2013	Sporting Charleroi	4	(0)
2011–2012	→ Virton (loan)	14	(4)
2013–2014	Olympic Charleroi	28	(18)
2015–2016	Wiltz 71	17	(5)
2016–2017	La Louvière	12	(5)
2017	Atlanta Silverbacks	11	(3)
2018	Patro Eisden		
2018–2019	Wiltz 71	12	(6)
2019	Al Akhdar		
2019	Kawkab Marrakech		
2020–2022	Ashanti Golden Boys		
- * Club domestic league appearances and goals

Mory-Fallo Keïta (born 13 December 1992) is a Guinean professional footballer who plays as a forward.

== Club career ==
Keïta with Sporting Charleroi

Keïta with Olympic Charleroi

=== Youth career ===
Mory began his footballing career at the age of 12 with his hometown, Conakry-based local side, FC Boly Coleyah. In 2005, he began playing for another local side, Elephants de Coleyah. He signed a one-year contract in 2006 with Baraka Djoma SSG and represented the Conakry-based side at various levels. He first moved out of Guinea in 2007 to Belgium where he began plying his trade with the junior sides of Belgian giants, Sporting Charleroi

=== Charleroi ===
Impressed with his brilliant display for the junior sides of the Charleroi-based side, the club management decide to promote the player to the senior side in 2007. He made his debut for the senior side on 3 February 2011 in a 2–0 win over Beerschot AC. He made 4 appearances in the 2010–11 Belgian Pro League.

=== Virton ===
He moved on loan to Belgian Division 3 side, Virton in 2011. He made his Belgian Second Amateur Division debut and scored his first goal in the competition on 24 August 2011 in a 1–0 win over Royal Football Club Huy. He scored 10 goals in 16 appearances in the 2011–12 Belgian Division 3 season before completing his one-year loan period at the Huy-based club.

=== Olympic de Charleroi ===
He moved back Charleroi in 2013 where he signed a one-year contract with Belgian Division 3 side, Olympic Charleroi. He scored 18 goals in 28 appearances in the 2013–14 Belgian Division 3. He was highly praised for his performances as he had earned his form back after a long unsuccessful period of time and a number of injuries.

=== Wiltz 71 ===
He moved out of Belgium in 2015 after a five-year long spell to Luxembourg where he signed a one-year contract with Wiltz-based side, FC Wiltz 71. He made his Luxembourg National Division on 2 August 2015 in a 6–0 loss against F91 Dudelange and scored his first goal in the competition on 27 September 2015 in a 1–0 win over FC UNA Strassen He scored 5 goals in 20 appearances in the 2015–16 Luxembourg National Division.

=== Return to Wiltz 71 ===
A few hours before the closing of the summer transfer market, Keïta re-joined FC Wiltz 71 after a short period at Belgian club Patro Eisden Maasmechelen. He played 14 games and scored 6 goals before he left at the end of 2018.

=== Al Akhdar ===
In the winter 2018–19, it was reported that Keïta had signed with Al Akhdar SC in Libya. He confirmed in an interview in February 2019, that the club had invited him, paid for everything and he had signed a six-months contract with an option for one further year. However, he also announced in the interview, that he was waiting for his work visa.

=== Kawkab Marrakech ===
On 25 July 2019 it was confirmed, that Keïta had joined Moroccan club Kawkab Marrakech.

=== Ashanti Golden Boys ===
In 2020, Keïta returned to Guinea where he signed with Guinée Championnat National club Ashanti Golden Boys.
