= Eric Reverter =

Spanish footballer

Personal information
- Full name: Eric Reverter Castellet
- Date of birth: 7 January 1992 (age 34)
- Place of birth: Sabadell, Spain
- Height: 1.77 m (5 ft 9 1/2 in)
- Position: Winger

Team information
- Current team: Sant Cugat

Youth career
- 1998–2000: Barberà Andalucía
- 2000–2005: Barcelona
- 2005–2006: Terrassa
- 2006–2008: Albacete
- 2008–2010: Josep Gené
- 2010–2011: Hospitalet

Senior career*
Years	Team	Apps	(Gls)
2011–2013	Sabadell B	48	(13)
2012–2014	Sabadell	4	(0)
2013–2014	→ Olot (loan)	29	(1)
2014–2015	Levante B	14	(3)
2015–2016	Olot	15	(1)
2016–2017	Europa	10	(1)
2017–	Sant Cugat		
- * Club domestic league appearances and goals as of 2 September 2018

Eric Reverter Castellet (born 7 January 1992) is a Spanish professional footballer who plays for Sant Cugat EFC as a left winger.

== Club career ==
Born in Sabadell, Barcelona, Catalonia, Reverter finished his formation with CE L'Hospitalet, but started appearing as a senior with neighbouring CE Sabadell FC's reserve team. On 21 October 2012 he made his professional debut with the latter, playing the last eight minutes in a 0–1 away loss against UD Las Palmas in the Segunda División championship.

On 22 July 2013, after only 86 minutes of action in the league, Reverter signed with UE Olot from Segunda División B, on loan.
