= August Lenz =

German footballer

Personal information
- Date of birth: 29 November 1910
- Date of death: 5 December 1988 (aged 78)
- Position: Forward

Senior career*
Years	Team	Apps	(Gls)
- Borussia Dortmund

International career
1935–1938	Germany	14	(9)
- * Club domestic league appearances and goals

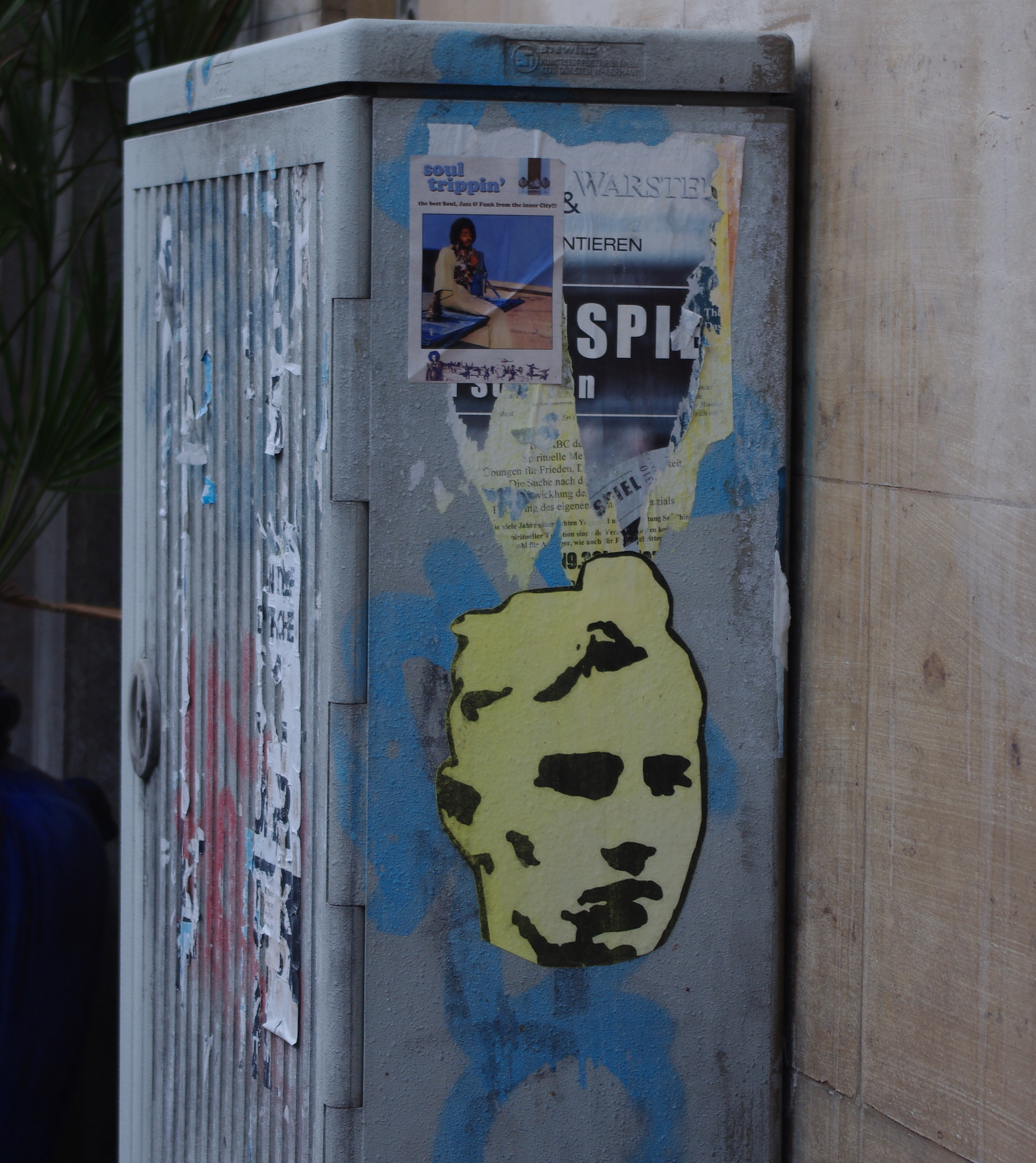
August Lenz

August Lenz (29 November 1910 – 5 December 1988) was a German international footballer.

In his first five appearances for the Germany national team he scored six goals, later his goalscoring tally dried up but he made nine goals in 14 matches. He was also part of Germany's squad at the 1936 Summer Olympics.
