= Martine Schon =

Luxembourgish footballer

Personal information
- Date of birth: 7 December 1992 (age 33)
- Position: Forward

Senior career*
Years	Team	Apps	(Gls)
2018–2023	AS Wincrange	45	(13)

International career^{‡}
2020–2022	Luxembourg	5	(0)
- * Club domestic league appearances and goals as of 31 May 2024 ‡ National team caps and goals as of 21 February 2022

Martine Schon (born 7 December 1992) is a Luxembourgish footballer who played as a forward for Dames Ligue 1 club AS Wincrange and the Luxembourg women's national team.

== International career ==
Schon made her senior debut for Luxembourg on 20 September 2020 during a 0–3 friendly loss against Bulgaria.
