= Valeri Sarmont =

Ukrainian-born Russian footballer

Personal information
- Full name: Valeri Nikolayevich Sarmont
- Date of birth: 28 January 1992 (age 34)
- Place of birth: Dniprodzerzhynsk, Ukraine
- Height: 1.90 m (6 ft 3 in)
- Position: Defender

Youth career
- SDYuSShOR-5 Yunost Kaliningrad

Senior career*
Years	Team	Apps	(Gls)
2012	Baltika Kaliningrad	0	(0)
2013–2015	Rominta Gołdap		
2015–2017	Baltika Kaliningrad	33	(2)
2018–2019	Luki-Energiya Velikiye Luki	23	(2)
- * Club domestic league appearances and goals

Valeri Nikolayevich Sarmont (Russian: Валерий Николаевич Сармонт; born 28 January 1992) is a Russian former professional footballer who played as a defender.

== Club career ==
He made his debut in the Russian Football National League for FC Baltika Kaliningrad on 31 August 2015 in a game against FC Sibir Novosibirsk.
