= Gabriel Viana =

Portuguese footballer

Personal information
- Full name: Vítor Gabriel Lourenço Viana
- Date of birth: 28 July 1992 (age 34)
- Place of birth: Deão, Viana do Castelo, Portugal
- Height: 1.77 m (5 ft 9 1/2 in)
- Position: Midfielder

Team information
- Current team: Correlhã

Youth career
- 2002–2009: Vianense
- 2009–2010: Leixões
- 2010–2011: Rio Ave

Senior career*
Years	Team	Apps	(Gls)
2011	AD Oliveirense	12	(0)
2012–2013	Trofense	1	(0)
2013	→ Espinho (loan)	4	(0)
2013–2014	Vianense	9	(0)
2014–2015	Ponte da Barca	23	(0)
2015–	Correlhã	5	(0)
- * Club domestic league appearances and goals as of 3 July 2016

Vítor Gabriel Lourenço Viana (born 28 July 1992) is a Portuguese footballer who plays for Associação Cultural e Desportiva da Correlhã, as a midfielder.
