= Sebastian Doro =

German footballer

Personal information
- Date of birth: July 7, 1992 (age 34)
- Place of birth: Potsdam, Germany
- Position: Defensive midfielder

Team information
- Current team: TV Oberfrohna

Youth career
- Teltower FV
- SV Babelsberg 03
- –2009: Energie Cottbus
- 2009–2011: 1899 Hoffenheim

Senior career*
Years	Team	Apps	(Gls)
2011–2012	Carl Zeiss Jena	2	(0)
2012–2014	FSV Zwickau	12	(0)
2014–2015	FSV Zwickau II	8	(0)
2015–2018	TSV Crossen		
2018–2020	SSV Fortschritt Lichtenstein		
2020–	TV Oberfrohna		
- * Club domestic league appearances and goals as of 5 April 2014

Sebastian Doro (born July 7, 1992) is a German footballer who plays as a defensive midfielder for TV Oberfrohna.

== Career ==
Doro played youth football for SV Babelsberg 03, Energie Cottbus, and later 1899 Hoffenheim. In 2011, he returned east to sign for Carl Zeiss Jena, where he made his professional debut in a 3. Liga match against Kickers Offenbach, as a substitute for Christoph Siefkes. After Jena were relegated to the Regionalliga Nordost at the end of the 2011–12 season, Doro left the club, signing for FSV Zwickau of the same division.
