= Jil Ludwig =

German football player

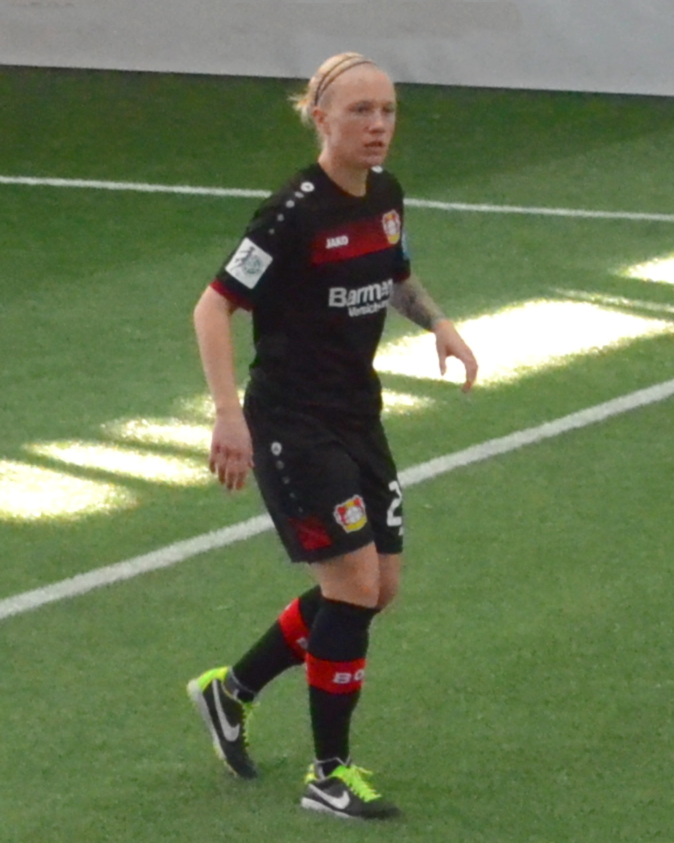

Personal information
- Date of birth: 31 May 1992 (age 34)
- Position: Midfielder

Jil Ludwig (born 31 May 1992) is a retired German footballer who played as a midfielder for Bayer 04 Leverkusen.
