= Niels Vets =

Belgian footballer

Personal information
- Full name: Niels Vets
- Date of birth: 19 February 1992 (age 34)
- Place of birth: Bonheiden, Belgium
- Height: 1.86 m (6 ft 1 in)
- Position: Centre back

Youth career
- Pijpelheide
- Peulis
- Lierse SK

Senior career*
Years	Team	Apps	(Gls)
2010–2012	Lierse SK	0	(0)
2012	→ KV Turnhout (loan)	12	(0)
2012–2013	→ Fortuna Sittard (loan)	13	(0)
2013–2015	Fortuna Sittard	12	(0)
2015–2016	Rupel Boom	2	(0)
- * Club domestic league appearances and goals

Niels Vets (born 19 February 1992 in Bonheiden) is a retired Belgian professional footballer who played as a centre back.

== Career ==
Niels began his career with Lierse, and in 2012 was loaned out to KV Turnhout. After a new loan spell with Fortuna Sittard in 2013, he signed a permanent deal with the club.

Injuries restricted his playing time, and in December 2015, he signed a contract with K. Rupel Boom FC.
