= Nkosinathi Ogle =

South African soccer player

Personal information
- Full name: Nathi Edwin Ogle
- Date of birth: 17 March 1992 (age 34)
- Place of birth: Port Edward, South Africa
- Height: 1.68 m (5 ft 6 in)
- Positions: Midfielder; striker

Youth career
- Orlando Pirates

Senior career*
Years	Team	Apps	(Gls)
–2009	University of Pretoria	19	(9)
2009–2010	Mpumalanga Black Aces	15	(12)
2010–2012	Thanda Royal Zulu	24	(13)
2012–2013	Golden Arrows	17	(2)
2013–	Moroka Swallows	9	(0)
- * Club domestic league appearances and goals as of 17:09, 21 October 2013 (UTC)

Nkosinathi Ogle (born 17 March 1990) is a South African professional soccer player, who plays for Premier Soccer League club Moroka Swallows as a midfielder and striker.
