= Malte Grashoff =

German footballer

Personal information
- Date of birth: 2 March 1992 (age 34)
- Place of birth: Stade, Germany
- Height: 1.86 m (6 ft 1 in)
- Position: Midfielder

Youth career
- 1996–1997: TSV Schwarme
- 1997–2002: MTV Riede
- 2002–2006: Werder Bremen
- 2006–2009: SC Weyhe
- 2009–2011: Werder Bremen

Senior career*
Years	Team	Apps	(Gls)
2011–2013	Werder Bremen II	50	(2)
2013–2014	Preußen Münster	0	(0)
2014–2015	VfB Oldenburg	14	(1)
2015	BSV Schwarz-Weiß Rehden	11	(0)
2015–2019	KSV Baunatal	89	(5)
Total		174	(12)
- * Club domestic league appearances and goals

Malte Grashoff (born 2 March 1992) is a German former professional footballer who played as a midfielder.

== Career ==
=== Youth ===
Grashoff played for local MTV Riede before moving to Werder Bremen at the age of 10. After four years at Werder Bremen he joined SC Weyhe, a smaller club in Lower Saxony. After his third year there, in which he achieved promotion to the Under 17 Bundesliga with the club's U17 side, he returned to Werder Bremen. He became a regular starter for the Werder's U19 side in his second year, helping the side become runners-up in the Under 19 Bundesliga North/Northeast. He was promoted to Werder Bremen II along with many of his U19 teammates.

=== Senior ===
Grashoff and made his debut for the Werder Bremen reserve team in September 2011, as a substitute for Lennart Thy in a 3. Liga match against SpVgg Unterhaching. He signed for Preußen Münster in July 2013.

He ended his professional career in 2015 after a stint with BSV Schwarz-Weiß Rehden and joined Hessenliga club KSV Baunatal. He played for Delbrücker SC from 2019 to 2021 and for Landesliga club SuS Bad Westernkotten in the 2021–22 season before re-joining his youth club MTV Riede in 2022.

== Personal life ==
Grashoff moved to Paderborn with his partner after his time at Rehden and was still living there in 2022. In 2022 they were expecting a second child.
