= Andrey Mishkevich =

Russian footballer

Personal information
- Full name: Andrey Alexandrovich Mishkevich
- Date of birth: 27 November 1992 (age 33)
- Place of birth: Volgograd, Russia
- Height: 1.86 m (6 ft 1 in)
- Position: Goalkeeper

Team information
- Current team: FC SKA-Khabarovsk (GK coach)

Youth career
- VKOR Volgograd
- FC Rotor Volgograd

Senior career*
Years	Team	Apps	(Gls)
2010–2011	FC Zhemchuzhina-Sochi	2	(0)
2012	FC Sokol Saratov	3	(0)
2012–2014	FC Olimpia Volgograd	29	(0)
2014	FC MITOS Novocherkassk	0	(0)
2014–2015	FC Angusht Nazran	18	(0)
2015–2016	FC Biolog Novokubansk	26	(0)
2017	FC Rotor Volgograd	3	(0)
2017	FC Afips Afipsky	0	(0)

Managerial career
- 2021–2022: FC Rotor-2 Volgograd (GK coach)
- 2022–2024: FC SKA-Khabarovsk-2 (GK coach)
- 2024–: FC SKA-Khabarovsk (GK coach)
- * Club domestic league appearances and goals

Andrey Alexandrovich Mishkevich (Russian: Андре́й Алекса́ндрович Мишке́вич; born 27 November 1992) is a Russian professional association football coach and a former player. He is the goalkeeping coach with FC SKA-Khabarovsk.

== Club career ==
He made his Russian Football National League debut for FC Zhemchuzhina-Sochi on 27 October 2010 in a game against FC Volga Nizhny Novgorod.
