= Samet Hasan Yıldıran =

Turkish footballer

Personal information
- Full name: Samet Hasan Yıldıran
- Date of birth: 19 September 1992 (age 34)
- Place of birth: Ünye, Turkey

Team information
- Current team: Aksaray 1989 SK

Youth career
- 2002–2006: Ünyespor
- 2006–2012: Samsunspor

Senior career*
Years	Team	Apps	(Gls)
2012	Samsunspor	8	(1)
2012–2013	Ünyespor	7	(0)
2013–2014	Yeni Diyarbakırspor	8	(2)
2014–2015	Kızılcabölükspor	10	(0)
2015–	Aksaray 1989 SK		
- * Club domestic league appearances and goals

Samet Hasan Yıldıran (born 19 September 1992) is a Turkish footballer who plays for Aksaray 1989 SK. He made his Süper Lig debut on 18 March 2012.
