= João Paulo (footballer, born 1992) =

Portuguese footballer

Personal information
- Full name: João Paulo Moreira dos Santos
- Date of birth: 15 August 1992 (age 34)
- Place of birth: Vale de Cambra, Portugal
- Height: 1.72 m (5 ft 8 in)
- Position: Midfielder

Team information
- Current team: Oliveirense

Youth career
- 2003–2005: Futsal
- 2005–2006: Valecambrense
- 2006–2011: Oliveirense

Senior career*
Years	Team	Apps	(Gls)
2011–	Oliveirense	1	(0)
2012	→ Cesarense (loan)	12	(0)
2013	→ Milheiroense (loan)	12	(0)
2014–2015	→ São Roque (loan)		
2015	→ Carregosense (loan)	11	(1)
2015–2016	→ São Roque (loan)	19	(3)
- * Club domestic league appearances and goals as of 14 August 2016

João Paulo Moreira dos Santos (born 15 August 1992) known as João Paulo, is a Portuguese footballer who plays for U.D. Oliveirense as a midfielder.

== Career ==
On 30 December 2012, João Paulo made his professional debut with Oliveirense in a 2012–13 Segunda Liga game against Leixões and played 12 minutes.
