= Thijs van Hofwegen =

Dutch footballer

Personal information
- Full name: Thijs van Hofwegen
- Date of birth: 30 November 1992 (age 33)
- Place of birth: Haarlemmermeer, Netherlands
- Height: 1.84 m (6 ft 1/2 in)
- Position: Defensive midfielder

Youth career
- DSOV
- RKVV Velsen
- IJVV Stormvogels
- Haarlem
- AZ
- 2011–2013: Jong Utrecht

Senior career*
Years	Team	Apps	(Gls)
2013–2014	Utrecht	2	(0)
2014–2016	NEC	0	(0)
2017	Jong FC Twente	5	(1)
2018	TEC	9	(0)
2018–2019	Quick Boys		
- * Club domestic league appearances and goals as of 12 October 2023

Thijs van Hofwegen (born 30 November 1992), is a Dutch retired footballer who played as a defensive midfielder. He formerly played for FC Utrecht and NEC.

== Career ==
Van Hofwegen started playing football at amateur outfit DSOV in Vijfhuizen and played for several clubs in his early years. He made his professional debut for Utrecht in 2013. He was then handed a contract by NEC in 2014, but after a heavy knee injury he ended up with Jong FC Twente.

In January 2018 he joined amateur side TEC, only to leave them for Quick Boys a half year later. He announced his departure from the club and his intentions to open a fashion shop en sports project in Bali in February 2019.
