= Giannis Dosis =

Greek footballer

Personal information
- Full name: Ioannis Dosis
- Date of birth: 24 October 1992 (age 34)
- Place of birth: Katerini, Greece
- Height: 1.79 m (5 ft 10 in)
- Position: Left-back

Team information
- Current team: Doxa Drama

Youth career
- Pierikos

Senior career*
Years	Team	Apps	(Gls)
2011–2014	Kavala		
2014–2015	Pierikos	21	(0)
2015–2016	Agrotikos Asteras	5	(0)
2016–2017	APE Langada		
2017	Pydna Kitros		
2017–2018	Volos		
2018–2019	Agrotikos Asteras		
2019–2020	Trikala	25	(0)
2020–2021	Pierikos	7	(0)
2021–2022	Tilikratis		
2022–	Doxa Drama	0	(0)
- * Club domestic league appearances and goals as of 12 May 2021

Giannis Dosis (Greek: Γιάννης Ντόσης; born 24 October 1992) is a Greek professional footballer who plays as a left-back for Doxa Drama.

== Honours ==
Volos

- Gamma Ethniki: 2017–18
