= Tnoy Andrew =

United States Virgin Islands footballer

Personal information
- Date of birth: 7 November 1992 (age 34)
- Place of birth: All Saints, Antigua and Barbuda
- Height: 1.75 m (5 ft 9 in)
- Position: Right-back

Team information
- Current team: Swetes FC

Senior career*
Years	Team	Apps	(Gls)
2011–2013	Young Warriors		
2013–2015	Bassa S.C.		
2015–	Swetes FC		

International career^{‡}
2015–	US Virgin Islands	13	(0)
- * Club domestic league appearances and goals ‡ National team caps and goals as of 1 March 2020

Tnoy Andrew (born 7 November 1992) is a footballer from the US Virgin Islands who plays as a defender for Swetes FC and the United States Virgin Islands national soccer team.

== Career ==
=== International career ===
Andrew made his senior international debut on 22 March 2015 in a 1–0 victory over Barbados during World Cup qualifying.

== Career statistics ==
=== International ===
As of match played 16 November 2019

National team	Year	Apps	Goals
US Virgin Islands	2015	2	0
US Virgin Islands	2016	3	0
US Virgin Islands	2018	3	0
US Virgin Islands	2019	5	0
Total		13	0
