= Naguib Chakouri =

French professional footballer (born 1992)

Personal information
- Date of birth: 10 August 1992 (age 34)
- Place of birth: France
- Height: 1.80 m (5 ft 11 in)
- Position: Defender

Team information
- Current team: Istres
- Number: 26

Senior career*
Years	Team	Apps	(Gls)
2012–	Istres	0	(0)
- * Club domestic league appearances and goals as of 10:37, 1 September 2012 (UTC)

Naguib Chakouri (born 10 August 1992) is a French professional footballer who currently plays as a defender for Ligue 2 side Istres. He made his professional debut in the 1–2 Coupe de la Ligue defeat to Clermont Foot on 7 August 2012.
