= Aljoscha Hyde =

German-Ghanaian footballer

Personal information
- Full name: Aljoscha Lartey Hyde
- Date of birth: 30 April 1992 (age 34)
- Place of birth: Langenhagen, Germany
- Height: 1.80 m (5 ft 11 in)
- Position: Defender

Team information
- Current team: SV Ramlingen-Ehlershausen
- Number: 3

Youth career
- –2003: SV Linden 07
- 2003-2004: Hannover 96
- 2004-2006: SV Arminia Hannover
- 2006–2007: SC Langenhagen
- 2008–2011: Werder Bremen

Senior career*
Years	Team	Apps	(Gls)
2011–2012	Werder Bremen II	13	(0)
2012–2013	SC Wiedenbrück	13	(0)
2013–2014	SV Wilhelmshaven	26	(0)
2014–2015	OSV Hannover		
2015–2018	Hannoverscher SC	67	(15)
2018–2020	SC Hemmingen-Westerfeld	9	(3)
2020	Hannoverscher SC	2	(0)
2020–2022	SC Hemmingen-Westerfeld	23	(1)
2022–	SV Ramlingen-Ehlershausen	13	(2)
- * Club domestic league appearances and goals as of 09:39, 18 November 2022 (UTC)

Aljoscha Lartey Hyde (born 30 April 1992) is a German-Ghanaian footballer who plays as a defender for Oberliga Niedersachsen club SV Ramlingen-Ehlershausen.

== Career ==
Hyde made his professional debut for Werder Bremen II in the 3. Liga on 21 January 2012, starting the match against Rot-Weiß Erfurt which finished as a 1–1 home draw.

In 2018 he left Hannoverscher SC to join SC Hemmingen-Westerfeld.
