= Georgios Kapnopoulos =

Greek footballer

Personal information
- Date of birth: 26 September 1992 (age 34)
- Place of birth: Kokkinokhoma, Kavala, Greece
- Height: 1.72 m (5 ft 8 in)
- Position: Central midfielder

Youth career
- Kavala

Senior career*
| Years | Team | Apps | (Gls) |
| 2010–2011 | Kavala | 1 | (0) |
| 2011–2012 | Panetolikos | 0 | (0) |
| 2012–2013 | Kavala | 1 | (0) |
| 2013–2014 | Vyzantio Kokkinochoma | 25 | (3) |
| 2014–2015 | Apollon Pontus | 0 | (0) |

International career
| 2011–2012 | Greece U19 | 1 | (0) |
- * Club domestic league appearances and goals as of April 2012

Georgios Kapnopoulos (Greek: Γεώργιος Καπνόπουλος; born 26 September 1992) is a Greek footballer.

== Career ==
Born in Kokkinokhoma, Pangaio, Kavala, Kapnopoulos began his playing career with Kavala.
