= Obinna Nwachukwu =

Nigerian footballer

Personal information
- Date of birth: 18 January 1992 (age 34)
- Position: Midfielder

Team information
- Current team: Heartland

Senior career*
Years	Team	Apps	(Gls)
2010–	Heartland		

International career^{‡}
2012–	Nigeria	5	(0)
- * Club domestic league appearances and goals as of 2 August 2012 ‡ National team caps and goals as of 21 June 2013

Obinna NwachukwuLosten (born 18 January 1992) is a Nigerian international footballer who plays for Heartland, as a midfielder.

== Career ==
Nwachukwu has played club football for Heartland.

He made his international debut for Nigeria in 2012.
