= Lionel Essono =

Cameroonian football player

Personal information
- Full name: Lionel Otto Essono
- Date of birth: 2 August 1992 (age 34)
- Place of birth: Cameroon
- Height: 1.75 m (5 ft 9 in)
- Positions: Left midfielder; left back

Team information
- Current team: New Stars Douala

Senior career*
Years	Team	Apps	(Gls)
2011–2012	San Roque		
2012–2013	Fokikos	50	(0)
2013–2014	Kissamikos		
2014–2015	Atromitos	0	(0)
2014–2015	→ Chania (loan)	21	(1)
2017	Canon Yaoundé		
2018–2019	Eding Sport		
2019–	New Stars Douala		
- * Club domestic league appearances and goals as of 9 July 2017 (UTC)

Lionel Essono (born 2 August 1992) is a Cameroonian football player who plays for New Stars Douala.
