= Adrien Ménager =

French footballer (born 1991)

Personal information
- Date of birth: 10 March 1991 (age 35)
- Place of birth: Pithiviers, France
- Height: 1.81 m (5 ft 11 in)
- Position: Midfielder

Team information
- Current team: Saint-Pryvé Saint-Hilaire FC

Youth career
- 2006–2010: Châteauroux

Senior career*
| Years | Team | Apps | (Gls) |
| 2010–2013 | Châteauroux | 7 | (0) |
| 2014– | Saint-Pryvé Saint-Hilaire FC | 72 | (2) |
- * Club domestic league appearances and goals as of 21:02, 4 February 2018 (UTC)

Adrien Ménager (born 10 March 1991) is a French professional footballer who plays as a midfielder for Saint-Pryvé Saint-Hilaire FC.

== Career ==
Ménager made his professional debut with Châteauroux on 10 May 2011, coming on as a substitute for Romain Grange in the 1–2 defeat to Angers.
