= Amian Clement =

Ivorian football player

Personal information
- Date of birth: 16 August 1992 (age 34)
- Place of birth: Abidjan, Ivory Coast
- Height: 1.78 m (5 ft 10 in)
- Position: Defender

Youth career
- 2010–2011: Sporting Covilhã

Senior career*
Years	Team	Apps	(Gls)
2011–2014	Sporting Covilhã	13	(0)
2012–2013	→ Anadia (loan)	20	(2)
2014–2015	Moimenta da Beira	16	(1)
2015	Lusitano FCV	8	(0)
2015–2016	AD Nogueirense	17	(1)
2016–2017	Praiense	30	(2)
2017–2018	Vizela	15	(0)
2018–2019	Varzim	6	(0)
- * Club domestic league appearances and goals as of 22:30, 21 October 2019 (UTC)

Amian Clement (born 16 August 1992) is an Ivorian football player.

== Club career ==
He made his professional debut in the Segunda Liga for Sporting Covilhã on 13 February 2011 in a game against Estoril.
