= Mama Bah-Yéré =

Beninese footballer

Personal information
- Full name: Sanni Mama Bah-Yéré
- Date of birth: 22 July 1992 (age 34)
- Place of birth: Parakou, Benin
- Height: 1.77 m (5 ft 10 in)
- Position: Left back

Team information
- Current team: ASPAC FC

Senior career*
Years	Team	Apps	(Gls)
2016–2019	Buffles du Borgou		
2019	Lobi Stars	0	(0)
2019–	ASPAC FC		

International career^{‡}
2017	Benin	8	(0)
- * Club domestic league appearances and goals as of 20:49, 13 June 2024 (UTC) ‡ National team caps and goals as of 20:49, 13 June 2024 (UTC)

Sanni Mama Bah-Yéré (born 22 July 1992) is a Beninese international footballer who plays for ASPAC FC, as a left back.
