= Leonardo (footballer, born June 1992) =

Brazilian footballer

Personal information
- Full name: Leonardo Ramos dos Santos
- Date of birth: 9 June 1992 (age 34)
- Place of birth: Ourinhos, Brazil
- Height: 1.86 m (6 ft 1 in)
- Position: Forward

Senior career*
Years	Team	Apps	(Gls)
2010–2012	Dinamo Minsk	30	(6)
2012–2013	Dila Gori	14	(1)
2013–2014	SKA-Energiya Khabarovsk	12	(0)
2014–2015	Samtredia	9	(1)
2015	Hapoel Bnei Lod	3	(0)
- * Club domestic league appearances and goals

Leonardo Ramos dos Santos, known as Leonardo (born 9 June 1992) is a Brazilian former professional footballer who played as a forward.

== Career ==
=== Dinamo Minsk ===
Leonardo was born in Ourinhos. He made his league debut against Naftan on 19 June 2010. He scored his first league goal against Vitebsk on 21 May 2011, scoring in the 69th minute.

=== Dila Gori ===
Leonardo made his league debut against WIT Georgia on 31 October 2012. He scored his first league goal against Chikhura on 18 May 2013, scoring in the 30th minute.

=== SKA-Energiya Khabarovsk ===
Leonardo made his league debut against Torpedo Moskva on 18 July 2013.

=== Samtredia ===
Leonardo made his league debut against Dinamo Zugdidi on 25 October 2014. He scored his first league goal against Merani Martvili on 22 May 2015, scoring in the 83rd minute.

=== Hapoel Bnei Lod ===
Leonardo made his league debut against Maccabi Kiryat Gat on 31 August 2015.

== Career statistics ==
Appearances and goals by club, season and competition
Club	Season	League			National cup		Continental		Other		Total	
Club	Season	Division	Apps	Goals	Apps	Goals	Apps	Goals	Apps	Goals	Apps	Goals
Dinamo Minsk	2010	Belarusian Premier League	6	0	1	0	3	0	–		10	0
Dinamo Minsk	2011	Belarusian Premier League	19	6	2	0	–		–		21	6
Dinamo Minsk	2012	Belarusian Premier League	5	0	0	0	–		–		5	0
Dinamo Minsk	Total		30	6	3	0	3	0	0	0	!36	6
Dila Gori	2012–13	Umaglesi Liga	14	1	2	0	–		1	0	17	1
SKA-Energiya Khabarovsk	2013–14	Russian National League	12	0	2	1	–		–		14	1
Samtredia	2014–15	Umaglesi Liga	9	1	4	0	–		–		13	1
Hapoel Bnei Lod	2014–15	Liga Leumit	1	0	0	0	–		–		1	0
Career total			66	8	11	1	3	0	1	0	81	9
