= Johan Svantesson =

Swedish footballer

Personal information
- Date of birth: 13 September 1992 (age 34)
- Place of birth: Sweden
- Height: 1.84 m (6 ft 0 in)
- Position: Forward

Youth career
- Levene/Skogslund IF
- Vara SK

Senior career*
Years	Team	Apps	(Gls)
2010–2011	Vara SK	42	(36)
2012–2013	Gefle IF	4	
2015	IF VP Uppsala	9	(2)
2016	Melbourne University SC	10	(5)
2017–2021	Reymersholms IK	76	(22)
- * Club domestic league appearances and goals

Johan Svantesson (born 13 September 1992) is a Swedish former professional footballer.

Svantesson started his footballing career in Levene/Skogslund IF and Vara SK, two football clubs based in Vara, Sweden, the latter competing in Division 4. In December 2011 he was signed to Gefle IF, moving to Gävle after the new year.

He suffered two consecutive injuries during the 2012 season, with a sprain in April followed by a rough tackle a few months later. These injuries caused long-term pain, leaving him benched for the 2013 season and eventually resulting in him terminating his contract and leaving professional football in September 2013.

After leaving professional football he began studying economics in Uppsala. He continued playing football outside the elite scene, playing in IF VP Uppsala in 2015 and Melbourne University SC in 2016 during an exchange year in Melbourne. After returning to Sweden he moved to Stockholm, where he joined the Division 4 team Reymersholms IK and played from 2017 until 2021, the year where Reyersholm was promoted to Division 3.

Svantesson currently works at Norron Asset Management, where he is the portfolio manager of the Sustainable Equity strategy.
