= Murach =

Murach may refer to:

- Michael Murach (1911–1941), German amateur welterweight boxer
- Heinz Murach (1926–2007), German football coach
- Murach (Schwarzach), a river of Bavaria, Germany, tributary of the Schwarzach
- Niedermurach, a municipality in the district of Schwandorf in Bavaria, Germany
