= Borussia Dortmund =

Association football club in Germany

- Full name: Ballspielverein Borussia 09 e. V. Dortmund
- Nicknames: Die Borussen (The Prussians); Die Schwarzgelben (The Black and Yellow)
- Short name: BVB
- Founded: 19 December 1909; 116 years ago
- Stadium: Signal Iduna Park
- Capacity: 81,365
- President: Hans-Joachim Watzke
- CEO: Lars Ricken
- Head coach: Niko Kovač
- League: Bundesliga
- 2025–26: Bundesliga, 2nd of 18
- Website: bvb.de
| Home colours | Away colours | Third colours |

Borussia Dortmund
- Traded as: SDAX
- Headquarters: Dortmund

Ballspielverein Borussia 09 e. V. Dortmund, often known simply as Borussia Dortmund (German pronunciation: [boˈʁʊsi̯a ˈdɔʁtmʊnt]) or by its initialism BVB (pronounced [ˌbeːfaʊ̯ˈbeː]), or just Dortmund by international fans, is a German professional sports club based in Dortmund, North Rhine-Westphalia. It is best known for its men's professional football team, which plays in the Bundesliga, the top tier of the German football league system.

Founded in 1909 by eighteen football players from Dortmund, they are nicknamed Die Schwarzgelben (The Black and Yellow), for the colours used in the club's crest. They hold a long-standing rivalry with Ruhr neighbours Schalke 04, against whom they contest the Revierderby. They also contest Der Klassiker with FC Bayern Munich. Dortmund is the largest sports club by membership in Germany after FC Bayern Munich, with about 218,000 members, making Borussia Dortmund the fifth largest sports club by membership in the world. The club also has a women's handball team. Since 1974, Dortmund have played their home games at the Westfalenstadion; the stadium is the largest in Germany, with the Yellow Wall, a standing terrace in the South Stand, the largest of its kind in Europe. Dortmund has also the highest average attendance of any association football club in the world.

Dortmund is the second most decorated German football team; domestically, they have eight league championships, five DFB-Pokal, and six DFL-Supercup titles. Internationally, they won the UEFA Champions League in 1997, the European Cup Winners' Cup in 1966, and the Intercontinental Cup in 1997, in addition to being the runners-up in the Champions League in 2013 and 2024 and in the UEFA Cup (now the UEFA Europa League) in 1993 and 2002.

Under the directorship of Michael Zorc in the 2010s, Dortmund cultivated a reputation for spotting and developing young talent, and have remained focused on developing a youth system. As of 2024, Dortmund had the second most revenue across football clubs in Germany, and the 12th most revenue across all football teams in the world, per Deloitte's Football Money League.

== History ==
=== Foundation and early years ===
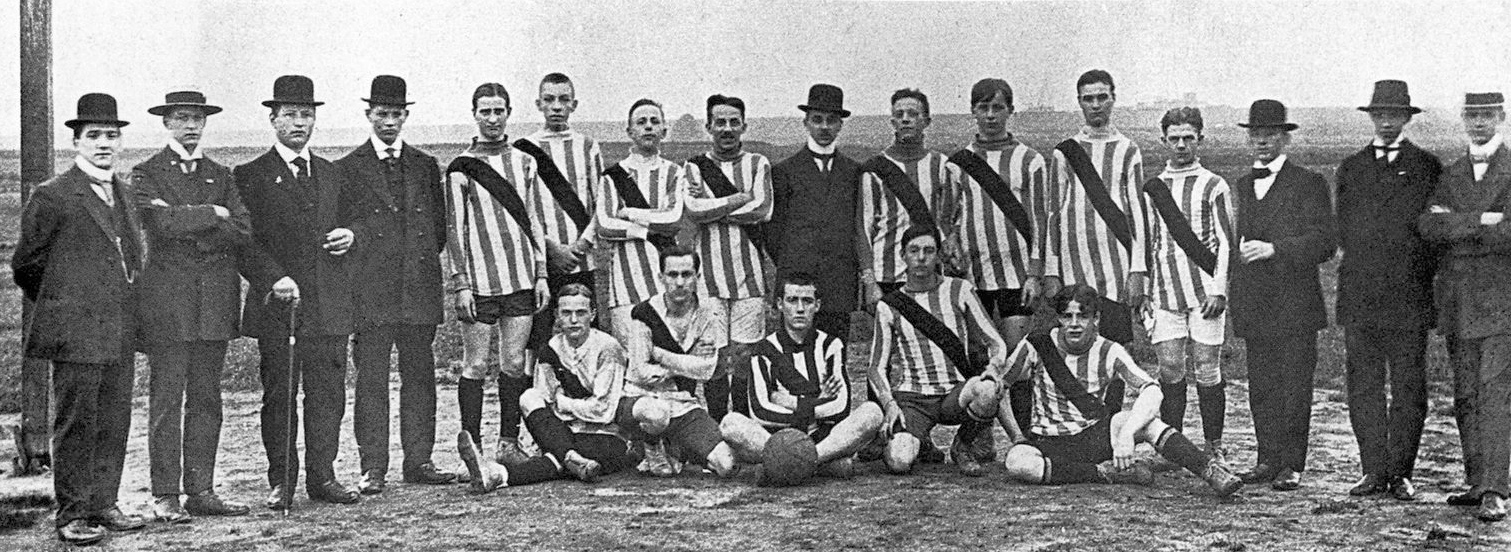
Borussia Dortmund in 1913

The club was founded on 19 December 1909 by a group of young men unhappy with the Catholic church-sponsored Trinity Youth, where they played football under the guidance of the local parish priest. The priest, Father Dewald was blocked at the door when he tried to break up the organising meeting being held in a room of the local pub, Zum Wildschütz. The founders were Franz and Paul Braun, Henry Cleve, Hans Debest, Paul Dziendzielle, Franz, Julius and Wilhelm Jacobi, Hans Kahn, Gustav Müller, Franz Risse, Fritz Schulte, Hans Siebold, August Tönnesmann, Heinrich and Robert Unger, Fritz Weber and Franz Wendt. The name Borussia is Latin for Prussia but was taken from Borussia beer from the nearby Borussia brewery in Dortmund. The team began playing in blue and white striped shirts with a red sash, and black shorts. In 1913, they donned the black and yellow stripes for the first time.

Over the next decades the club had only modest success playing in local leagues. They came close to bankruptcy in 1929 when an attempt to boost the club's fortunes by signing some paid professional footballers failed miserably and left the team deep in debt. They survived only through the generosity of a local supporter who covered the team's shortfall out of his own pocket.

The 1930s saw the rise of the Third Reich, which restructured sports and football organisations throughout the nation to suit the regime's goals. Borussia's president was replaced when he refused to join the Nazi Party, and a couple of members who surreptitiously used the club's offices to produce anti-Nazi pamphlets were executed in the last days of the war. The club did have greater success in the newly established Gauliga Westfalen, but would have to wait until after the Second World War to make a breakthrough. It was during this time that Borussia developed its intense rivalry with Schalke 04 of suburban Gelsenkirchen, the most successful side of the era (see Revierderby). Like every other organisation in Germany, Borussia was dissolved by the Allied occupation authorities after the war in an attempt to distance the country's institutions from its recent Nazi past. There was a short-lived attempt to merge the club with two others – Werksportgemeinschaft Hoesch and Freier Sportverein 98 – as Sportgemeinschaft Borussia von 1898, but it was as Ballspiel-Verein Borussia (BVB) that they made their first appearance in the national league final in 1949.

=== First national titles ===
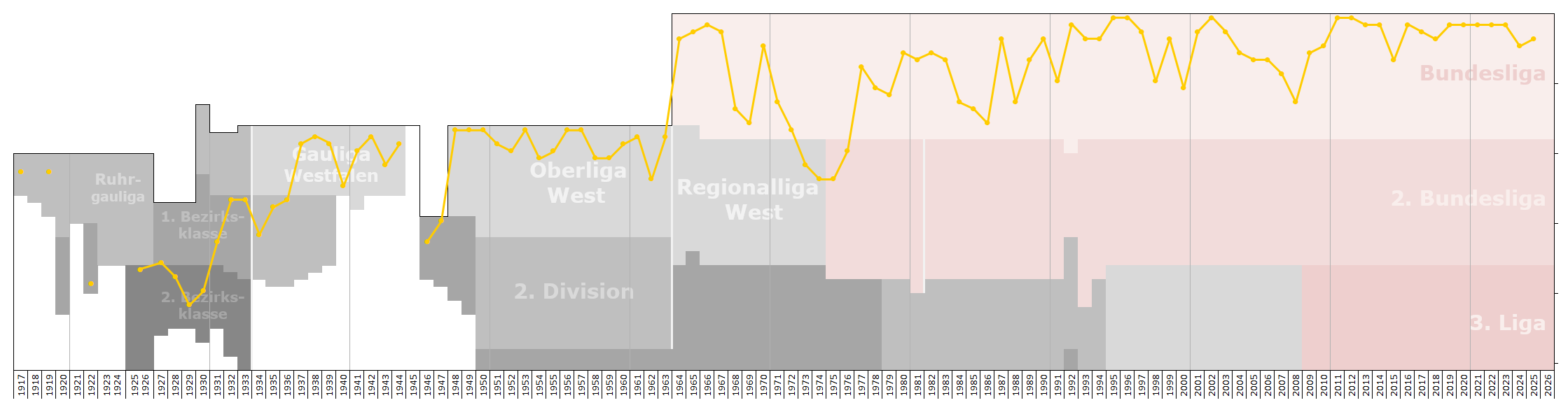
Historical chart of Borussia Dortmund league performance

Between 1946 and 1963, Borussia featured in the Oberliga West, a first division league which dominated German football through the late 1950s. In 1949, Borussia reached the final in Stuttgart against VfR Mannheim, which they lost 2–3 after extra time. The club claimed its first national title in 1956 with a 4–2 win against Karlsruher SC. One year later, Borussia defeated Hamburger SV 4–1 to win their second national title. After this coup, the three Alfredos (Alfred Preißler, Alfred Kelbassa and Alfred Niepieklo) were legends in Dortmund. In 1963, Borussia won the last edition of the German Football Championship (before the introduction of the new Bundesliga) to secure their third national title.

=== Bundesliga debut ===
In 1962, the DFB met in Dortmund and voted to establish a professional football league in Germany, to begin play in August 1963 as the Bundesliga. Borussia Dortmund earned its place among the first sixteen clubs to play in the league by winning the last pre-Bundesliga national championship. Runners-up 1. FC Köln also earned an automatic berth. Dortmund's Friedhelm Konietzka scored the first-ever Bundesliga goal a minute into the match, which they would eventually lose 2–3 to Werder Bremen.

In 1965, Dortmund won its first DFB-Pokal. In 1966, Dortmund won the European Cup Winners' Cup 2–1 against Liverpool in extra time, with the goals coming from Sigfried Held and Reinhard Libuda. In the same year, however, the team lost their top position on the Bundesliga by losing four of their last five league games and finishing second, three points behind champions 1860 München, most of whose success came on the strength of the play of Konietzka, recently transferred from Dortmund.

The 1970s were characterised by financial problems, relegation from the Bundesliga in 1972, and the opening of the Westfalenstadion, named after its home region Westphalia in 1974. The club returned to the Bundesliga in 1976.

Dortmund continued to have financial problems through the 1980s. BVB avoided being relegated in 1986 by winning a third decisive playoff game against Fortuna Köln after finishing the regular season in 16th place. Dortmund did not have any significant success again until a 4–1 DFB-Pokal win in 1989 against Werder Bremen. It was Horst Köppel's first trophy as a manager. Dortmund then won the 1989 DFL-Supercup 4–3 against rivals Bayern Munich.

=== Golden age – the 1990s ===
After a tenth-place finish in the Bundesliga in 1991, manager Horst Köppel was sacked and manager Ottmar Hitzfeld was hired.

In 1992, Hitzfeld led Borussia Dortmund to a second-place finish in the Bundesliga, and would have won the title had VfB Stuttgart not won their last game to become champions instead.

Along with a fourth-place finish in the Bundesliga, Dortmund made it to the 1993 UEFA Cup final, which they lost 6–1 on aggregate to Juventus. In spite of this result, Borussia walked away with DM25 million under the prize money pool system in place at the time for German sides participating in the Cup. Thanks to the prize money, Dortmund was able to sign players who later brought them numerous honours in the 1990s.

Under the captaincy of 1996 European Footballer of the Year Matthias Sammer, Borussia Dortmund won back-to-back Bundesliga titles in 1995 and 1996. Dortmund also won the DFL-Supercup against Mönchengladbach in 1995 and 1. FC Kaiserslautern in 1996.

In 1996–97 the team reached its first European Cup final. In a memorable match at the Olympiastadion in Munich, Dortmund faced the holders Juventus. Karl-Heinz Riedle put Dortmund ahead, shooting under goalkeeper Angelo Peruzzi from a cross by Paul Lambert. Riedle then made it two with a bullet header from a corner kick. In the second half, Alessandro Del Piero pulled one back for Juventus with a back heel. Then 20-year-old substitute and Dortmund-born Lars Ricken latched onto a through pass by Andreas Möller. Only 16 seconds after coming on to the pitch, Ricken chipped Peruzzi in the Juventus goal from over 20 yards out with his first touch of the ball. With Zinedine Zidane unable to make an impression for Juventus against the close marking of Lambert, Dortmund lifted the trophy with a 3–1 victory. Hitzfeld's successful managerial reign then ended, with Nevio Scala being appointed as his successor.

Dortmund then beat Brazilian club Cruzeiro 2–0 in the 1997 Intercontinental Cup final to become world club champions. Borussia Dortmund were the second German club to win the Intercontinental Cup, after Bayern Munich in 1976.

As defending champions, Dortmund reached the Champions League semi-final in 1998. The team was missing key players from the start of the season when they played Real Madrid in the 1998 semi-final. Sammer's career was shortened by injury and only played three first team games after the 1997 Champions League win. Lambert had left in November to return to play in Scotland. Möller missed the first leg as did Kohler who missed both games in the tie. Real won the first leg 2–0 at home. Dortmund played better in the second leg, but did not take their chances. The club exited 2–0 on aggregate.

=== 21st century and Borussia "goes public" ===
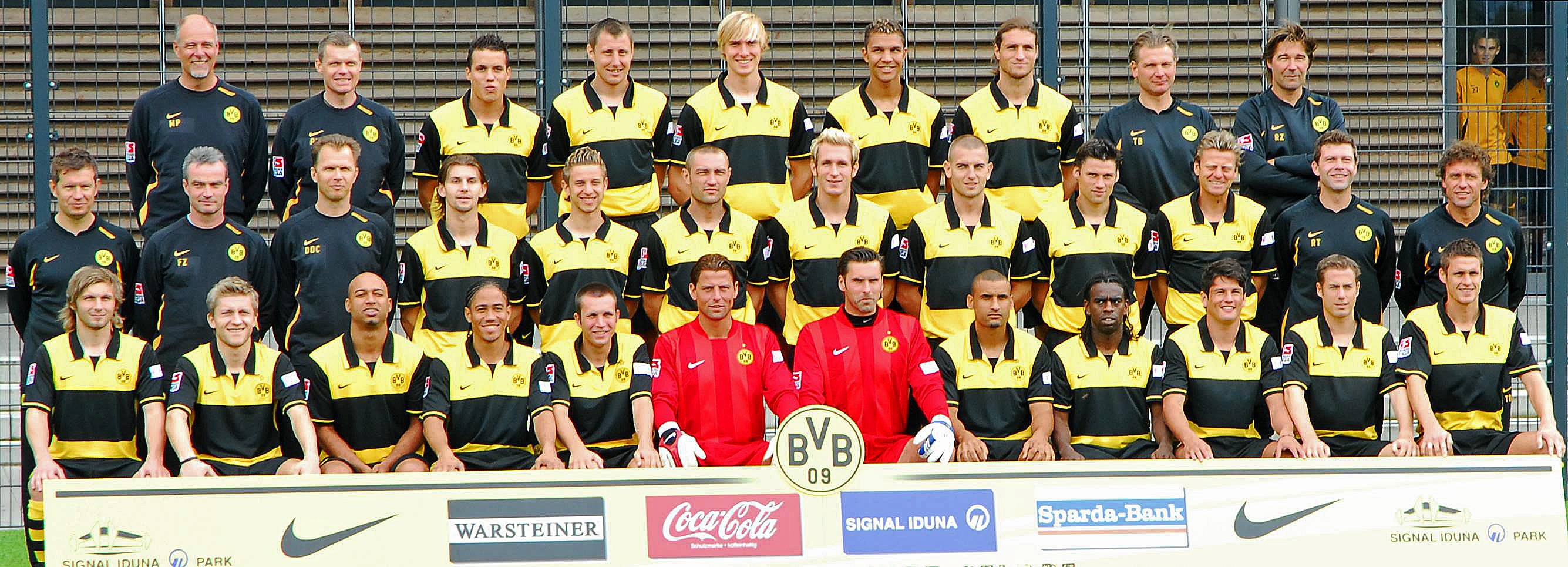
Borussia Dortmund in 2007

In October 2000, Borussia Dortmund became the first publicly traded club on the German stock market.

In 2002, Borussia Dortmund won their third Bundesliga title. Dortmund had a remarkable run at the end of the season to overtake Bayer Leverkusen, securing the title on the final day. Manager Matthias Sammer became the first person in Borussia Dortmund history to win the Bundesliga as both a player and manager. In the same season, Borussia lost the final of the 2001–02 UEFA Cup to the Dutch club Feyenoord.

Dortmund's fortunes then steadily declined for several years. Poor financial management led to a heavy debt load and the sale of their Westfalenstadion grounds. The situation was compounded by failure to advance in the 2003–04 UEFA Champions League, when the team was eliminated on penalties in the qualifying rounds by Club Brugge. In 2003, Bayern Munich loaned €2 million to Dortmund for several months to pay their payroll. Borussia again came close to bankruptcy in 2005, with the original €11 value of its shares having dropped by over 80% on the Frankfurt Stock Exchange.

At this time Hans-Joachim Watzke was appointed CEO and streamlined the club. The response to the crisis included a 20% pay cut for all players. In 2006, in order to reduce debt, the Westfalenstadion was renamed "Signal Iduna Park" after a local insurance company. The naming rights agreement ran until 2021.

Dortmund suffered a miserable start to the 2005–06 season, but rallied to finish seventh. The club was unable gain a place in the UEFA Cup via the Fair Play draw. The club's management indicated that the club again showed a profit; this was largely related to the sale of David Odonkor to Real Betis and Tomáš Rosický to Arsenal.

In the 2006–07 season, Dortmund unexpectedly faced serious relegation trouble for the first time in years. Dortmund went through three coaches, and appointed Thomas Doll on 13 March 2007, after dropping to just one point above the relegation zone. Christoph Metzelder also left Borussia Dortmund on a free transfer.

In the 2007–08 season, Dortmund finished 13th in the Bundesliga table, but reached the DFB-Pokal final against Bayern Munich, where they lost 2–1 in extra time. The final appearance qualified Dortmund for the UEFA Cup, because Bayern had already qualified for the Champions League. Thomas Doll resigned on 19 May 2008 and was replaced by Jürgen Klopp.

=== Klopp era and return to prominence ===
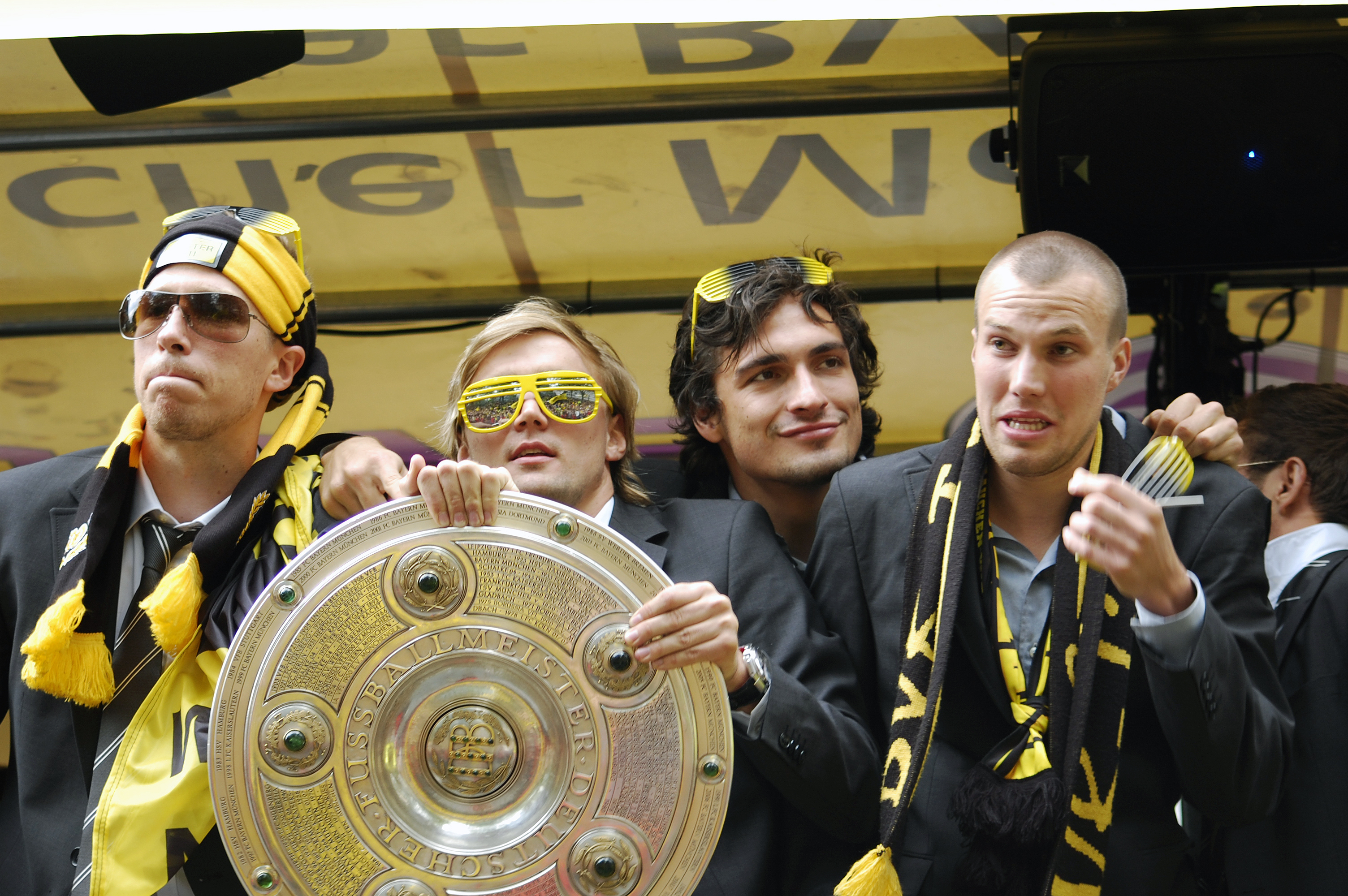
Borussia Dortmund players celebrate winning the Bundesliga in 2011.

In the 2009–10 season, Klopp's Dortmund improved on the season before, finishing fifth in the Bundesliga to qualify for the UEFA Europa League. The team missed an opportunity to qualify for the Champions League when they did not beat eighth-place VfL Wolfsburg and 14th-place SC Freiburg in the final two matches of the campaign.

Entering the 2010–11 season, Dortmund fielded a young and vibrant roster. On 4 December 2010, Borussia became Herbstmeister ("Autumn Champion"), an unofficial accolade going to the league leader at the winter break. They did this three matches before the break, sharing the record for having achieved this earliest with Eintracht Frankfurt (1993–94) and 1. FC Kaiserslautern (1997–98). On 30 April 2011, the club beat 1. FC Nürnberg 2–0 at home, while second-place Bayer Leverkusen lost, leaving Dortmund eight points clear with two games to play. This championship equalled the seven national titles held by rivals Schalke 04, and guaranteed a spot in the 2011–12 Champions League group stages.

One year later, Dortmund successfully defended of its Bundesliga title with a win over Borussia Mönchengladbach, again on the 32nd match day. By the 34th and final match day, Dortmund had set a new record with the most points—81—gained by a club in one Bundesliga season. The club's fifth Bundesliga title and eighth German championship overall placed it third in total national titles, allowing the club to wear two stars above its crest in recognition of the team's five Bundesliga titles. The club capped its successful 2011–12 season by winning the double for the first time, beating Bayern 5–2 in the final of the DFB-Pokal. Borussia Dortmund are one of four German clubs to win the Bundesliga and DFB-Pokal double, along with Bayern Munich, 1. FC Köln and Werder Bremen. The club was voted Team of the Year 2011 at the annual Sportler des Jahres (German Sports Personality of the Year) awards.

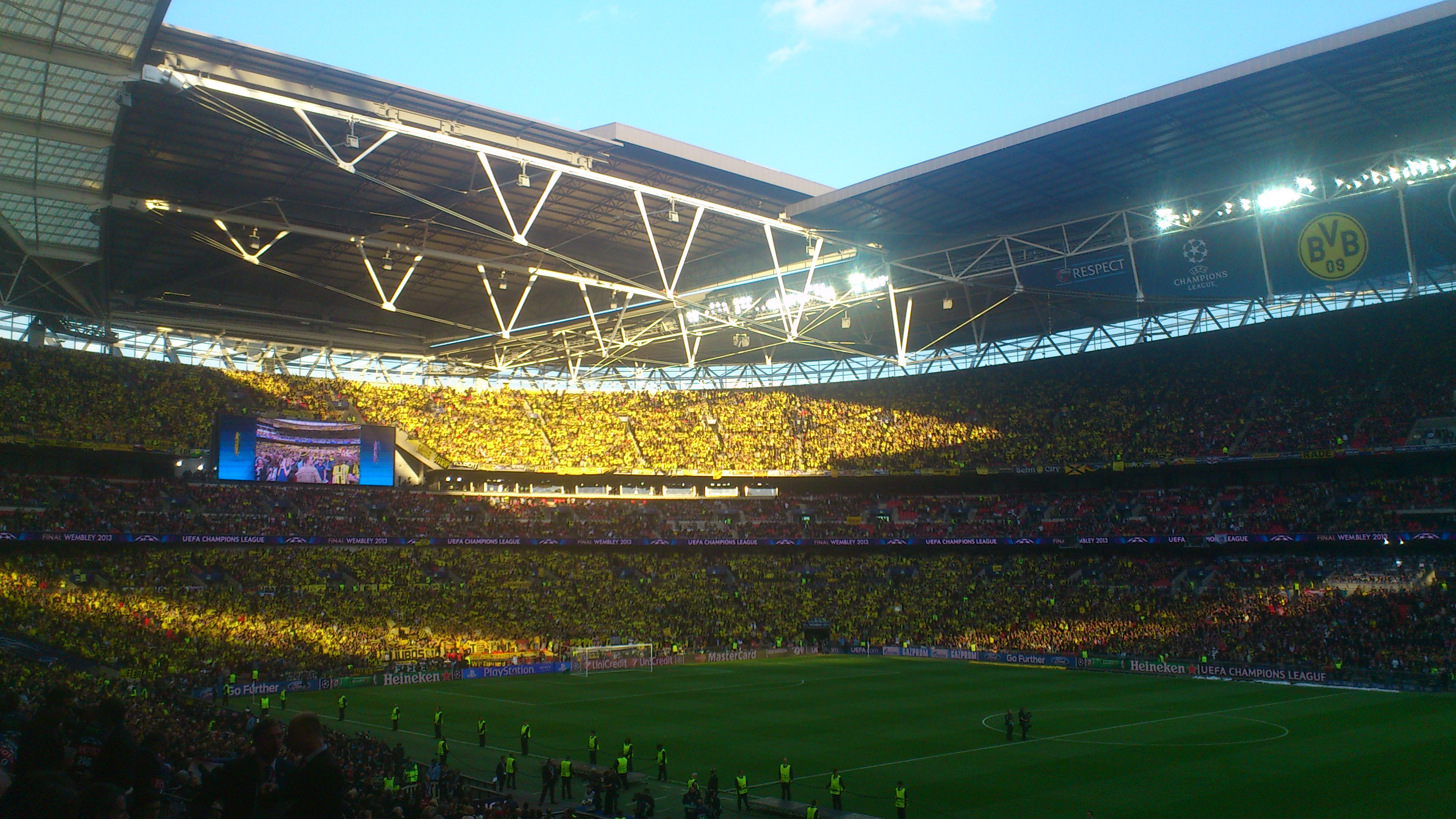
Borussia Dortmund fans at Wembley Stadium during the 2013 Champions League final

Borussia Dortmund ended the 2012–13 season in second place in the Bundesliga, finishing second to Bayern Munich which had set a league record of 91 points. In the UEFA Champions League, Dortmund defeated Real Madrid in the semi-finals, winning the home leg 4–1 and losing the away leg 0–2 to advance on aggregate goals. Dortmund played in their second UEFA Champions League final against Bayern Munich in the first ever all-German club final at Wembley Stadium on 25 May 2013, which they lost 2–1.

In the 2013–14 season, Borussia Dortmund won the 2013 DFL-Supercup 4–2 against rivals Bayern Munich. The 2013–14 season started with a five-game winning streak for Dortmund, their best start to a season. Despite a promising start, however, their season saw injuries to several key players, seeing them stoop as low as fourth place in the table, and with a depleted squad could go only as far as the quarter-finals of the Champions League, losing 3–2 on aggregate to Real Madrid. Nevertheless, Dortmund ended their season on a high note by finishing second in the Bundesliga and reaching the 2014 DFB-Pokal final, losing 0–2 to Bayern in extra time.

Dortmund begun their 2014–15 season by defeating Bayern in the 2014 DFL-Supercup 2–0. However, this victory did not affect the squad's solidity in performance at the start of the ensuing season, with Dortmund recording various results such as a 0–1 loss to Hamburger SV and two 2–2 draws against VfB Stuttgart and Bundesliga newcomers Paderborn 07. During the winter, Dortmund fell to the bottom of the table on multiple occasions, but escaped the relegation zone after four consecutive wins in February. On 15 April 2015, Jürgen Klopp announced that after seven years, he would be leaving Dortmund. Four days later, Dortmund announced that Thomas Tuchel would replace Klopp at the end of the season. Klopp's final season, however, ended on high note, rising and finishing seventh after facing relegation, gaining a DFB-Pokal final with VfL Wolfsburg and qualifying for the 2015–16 Europa League.

=== Post-Klopp era ===
In the 2015–16 season, Dortmund started off winning 4–0 against Borussia Mönchengladbach on the opening day, followed by five-straight wins which took them to the top of the Bundesliga. After the eighth matchday, they were surpassed by Bayern Munich following an unlucky draw with 1899 Hoffenheim. Dortmund kept their performances up, winning 24 out of 34 league games and becoming the best Bundesliga runner-up team of all time. In the Europa League, they advanced to the quarter-finals, getting knocked out by a Jürgen Klopp-led Liverpool in a dramatic comeback at Anfield, where defender Dejan Lovren scored a late goal to make it 4–3 to Liverpool and 5–4 on aggregate. In the 2015–16 DFB-Pokal, for the third-straight year, Dortmund made it to the competition final, but lost to Bayern Munich on penalties.

On 11 April 2017, three explosions occurred near the team's bus on its way to a Champions League match against AS Monaco at the Signal Iduna Park. Defender Marc Bartra was injured, and taken to hospital. Dortmund lost the game 2–3 to AS Monaco. Dortmund manager Tuchel blamed the loss on the ignorant decision by UEFA. UEFA said that the team made no objection to playing, and that the decision was made in compliance with the club and local law enforcement. In the second leg, Dortmund lost 1–3, leaving the aggregate score at 3–6, causing them to be eliminated from that year's UEFA Champions League. On 26 April, Dortmund defeated Bayern Munich 3–2 in Munich to advance to the 2017 DFB-Pokal final, Dortmund's fourth consecutive final and fifth in six seasons. On 27 May, Dortmund won the 2016–17 DFB-Pokal 2–1 over Eintracht Frankfurt with the winner coming from a penalty converted by Pierre-Emerick Aubameyang.

Ahead of the 2017–18 season, Thomas Tuchel stepped down as manager. The Dortmund board made a decision to hire Peter Bosz as the new manager and head coach. Although Bosz got off to a record-breaking start in the team's first 7 games, what followed was 20 games without a win, after which he was relieved of his staff role. Peter Stöger was announced as the interim coach. During the January window of the same season, Aubameyang and Bartra both left the club. Stöger bought Manuel Akanji of FC Basel for a fee of €21.5 million and Michy Batshuayi on a six-month loan from Chelsea. Stöger coached Dortmund for the rest of the season, granting them a fourth-place finish in the Bundesliga before stepping down at the end of the season.

In the summer of 2018, Dortmund appointed former OGC Nice coach, Lucien Favre as their manager/head coach. After a very busy transfer window for the team, seeing eight new players arrive at the club for the first team squad, Dortmund performed strongly, chasing Bayern Munich for the title race down to the last matchday, narrowly missing out on the league title by two points and earning Lucien Favre a contract extension. A four-part Amazon Prime Video documentary series was created, about the same season, named Inside Borussia Dortmund.

The next season, Dortmund announced a few big-name signings with the intent of winning the Bundesliga title. Although they won the DFL Supercup, this was their only silverware of the season. After a scrappy first half of the season, they changed their tactics and made a few more transfers in the January Window. They were eliminated in both the DFB-Pokal and the UEFA Champions League as well. Due to the COVID-19 pandemic in Germany, the season stopped abruptly. Once the season restarted, Dortmund looked better, but their performances were not enough to stop a dominant Bayern Munich side from winning the Bundesliga title. They finished the 2019–20 season in second place after beating RB Leipzig in matchweek 33 due to a brace from Erling Haaland.

Dortmund got off to a rather shaky start in the 2020–21 season. They lost the DFL-Supercup and had an inconsistent set of results in the Champions League and the Bundesliga. After a 5–1 defeat to Stuttgart in Matchday 11, Lucien Favre was relieved of his managerial duties. Assistant manager Edin Terzić was placed as the caretaker for the rest of the season. Under Terzić, Dortmund finished third on the final matchday of the Bundesliga and was eliminated in the quarter-finals of the Champions League in a match against Manchester City. The team then won the DFB-Pokal, defeating RB Leipzig 4–1 in the final.

Marco Rose was appointed manager for the 2021–22 season, with Terzić being appointed as the club's new technical director. Rose lead the club to a second-place finish in the league, but was sacked ahead of the 2022–23 season with Terzić being reappointed as manager. Before the final match day of that season, Dortmund were top of the league table, though they later lost the Bundesliga title on goal difference to Bayern Munich after a 2–2 home draw against Mainz.

After selling star player Jude Bellingham to Real Madrid for €103 million, Dortmund had a disappointing Bundesliga campaign in the 2023–24 season, finishing fifth, but experienced more success in the UEFA Champions League, knocking out PSV Eindhoven, Atlético Madrid and PSG in the knockout stages to reach the final for the first time in eleven years, where they lost 2–0 to Real Madrid.

Shortly before the end of the season, BVB management announced that the military weapons manufacturer Rheinmetall would be the future sponsor. The partnership includes the use of high-reach advertising space, marketing rights as well as event and hospitality offers in the stadium and on the club premises and a payment of one million euro per year until 2027 by Rheinmetall. The sponsorship has been heavily criticised by BVB fans.

In the 2024–25 season, BVB reached the quarter-finals of the 2025 FIFA Club World Cup, where they were defeated by Real Madrid.

== Crest ==
1945–1964

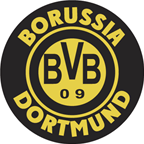
1964–1974

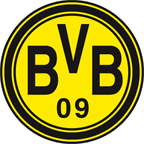
1974–1976 and 1978–1993

1976–1978

1993–present

2012–present

== Club identity and supporters ==
Supporters of Borussia Dortmund are widely seen as politicised, but divided. During the late 1980s to early 2000s, Dortmund terraces included far‑right hooligan factions (notably the Borussenfront), and antisemitic songs and racist chants were commonplace. From the early 2000s, a more progressive ultra movement began to reclaim the Südtribüne, supported by fan projects promoting anti-racism and democracy. Nonetheless, in 2012, the Borussenfront reappeared with increased activity. In 2013, two fan liaison officers were assaulted at a match in Donetsk, and in 2015, a documentary critical of right-wing extremism triggered threats and banners from hooligan factions. A new group, 0231 RIOT, emerged, combining violent members of existing ultra groups and engaging in antisemitic chants, graffiti, and threats before disbanding in 2017. Some of its members later joined a newer hooligan group called Northside.

In 2018, tensions escalated between left-leaning ultras and right-wing hooligans. On 24 March, members of Northside confronted younger ultras from The Unity at their headquarters, demanding an end to anti-racist and political messaging on the Südtribüne. On 10 November, during a high-profile match against Bayern Munich, far-right figures Sven Kahlin and Timo K., associated with violent and neo-Nazi networks, entered Block 13 and intimidated ultras into shaking hands as a show of dominance. They were accompanied by other Northside hooligans, and chants of "Sieg Heil" were reported. Borussia Dortmund officials said they intended to ban both men. The intimidation was part of a broader attempt to "de-politicise" fan culture by suppressing progressive messaging.

Concurrently, from the early 2000s onwards, BVD's Fan‑Projekt worked to expel extremist elements and establish "Kick Racism Out" street‑football outreach and youth education programmes. As of the 2020s, all officially recognised BVB fan clubs must sign statutes rejecting far‑right ideologies and affirming Germany's constitution; violators face stadium bans or loss of membership. The club and its supporters organise regular educational trips to former concentration camps (since 2008 for Dachau and 2011 for Auschwitz) and have donated over €1 million to Holocaust remembrance institutions such as Yad Vashem. Initiatives like "No Beer for Racists", which distribute coasters across Dortmund's pubs, further embed anti‑xenophobia messaging in fan culture.

== Grounds ==
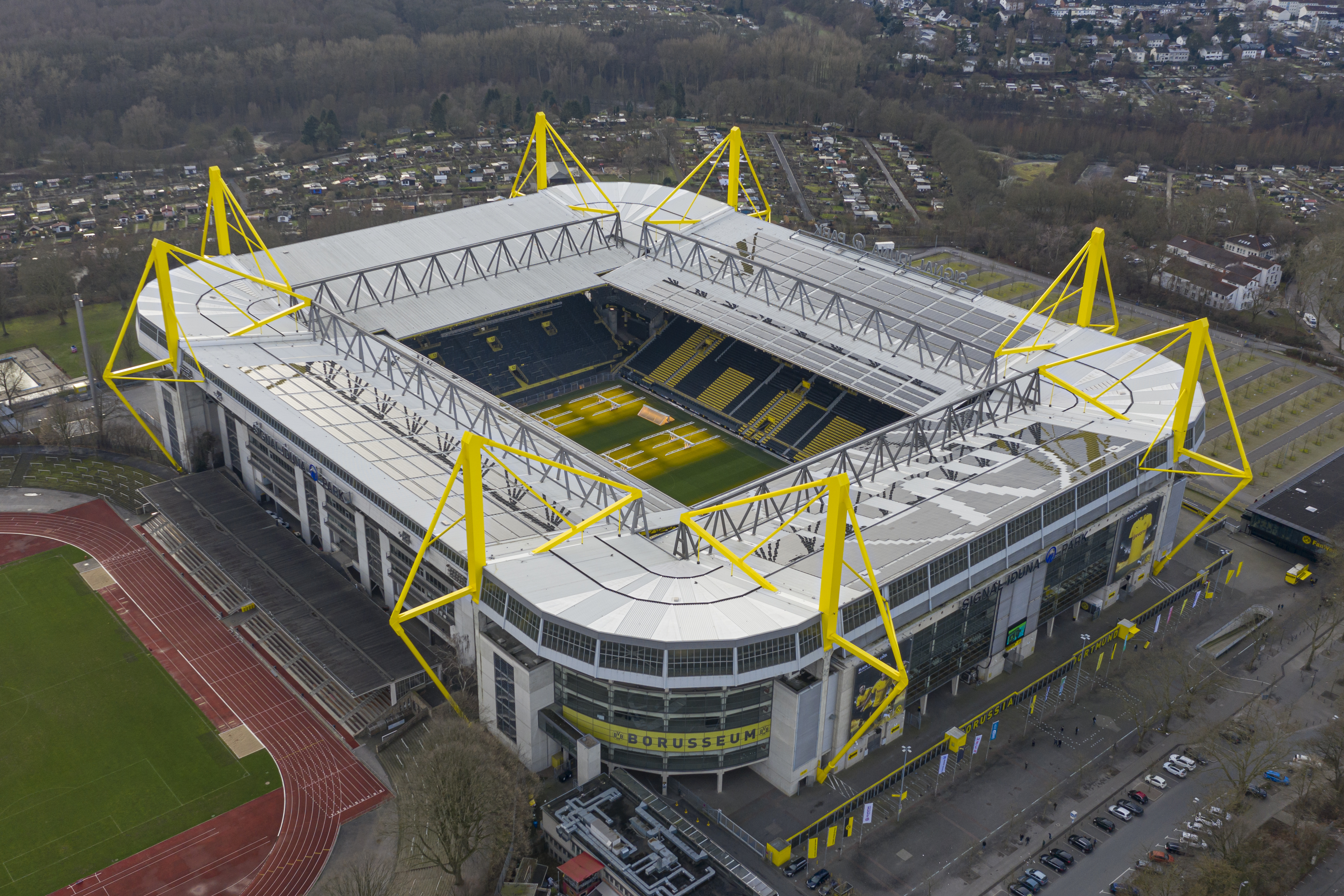
Signal Iduna Park is the biggest stadium in Germany.

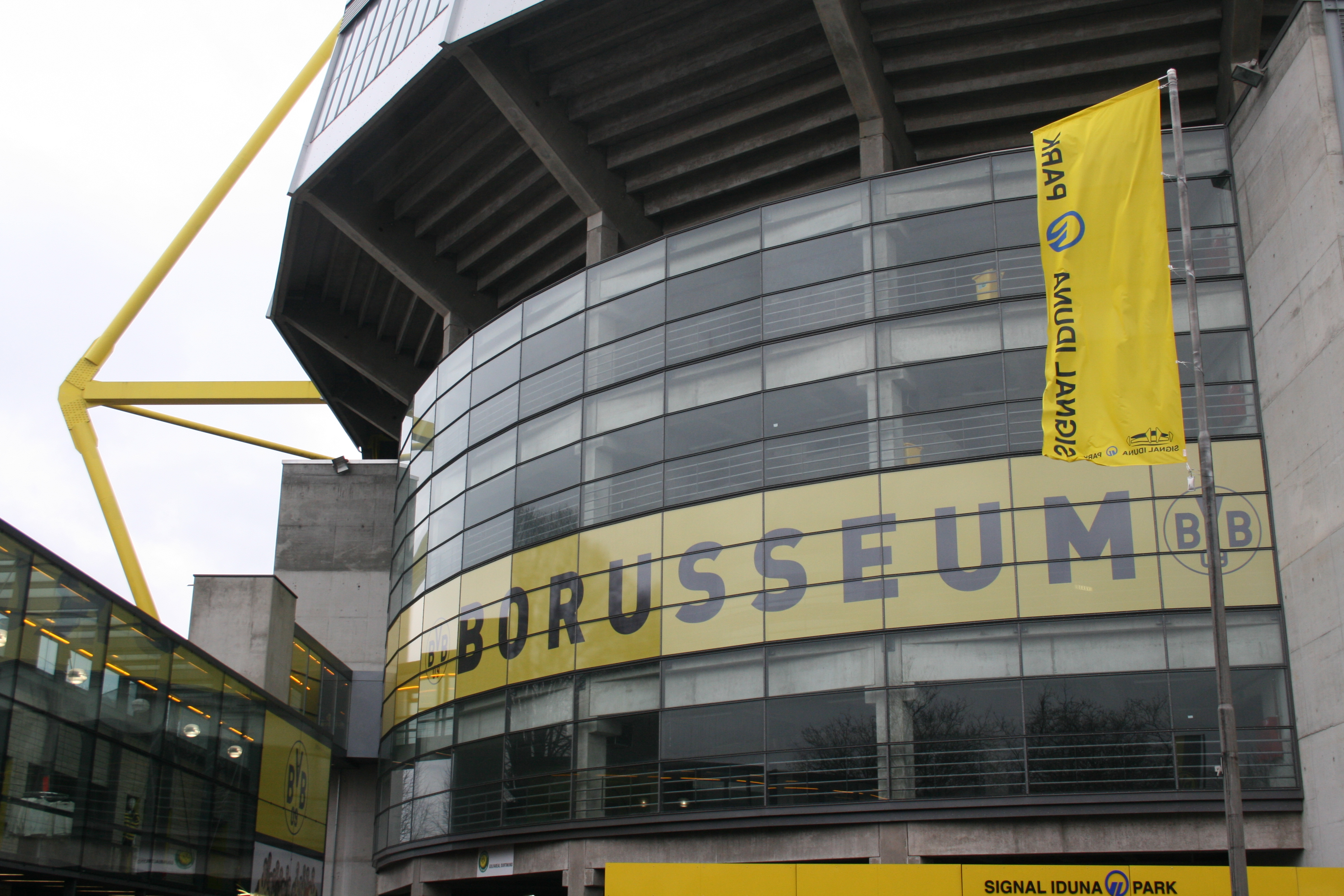
The Borusseum, a museum about Borussia Dortmund

=== Stadiums ===
The Westfalenstadion is the home stadium of Borussia Dortmund, Germany's largest stadium and the seventh-largest in Europe. The stadium was named "Signal Iduna Park" after insurance company Signal Iduna purchased the rights to name the stadium until 2021. This name, however, could not be used when hosting FIFA and UEFA events, since these governing bodies have policies forbidding corporate sponsorship from companies that are not official tournament partners. During the 2006 World Cup, the stadium was referred to as "FIFA World Cup Stadium, Dortmund", while in UEFA club matches, it is known as "BVB Stadion Dortmund". The stadium currently hosts up to 81,359 spectators (standing and seated) for league matches and 65,829 seated spectators for international matches. For these, the characteristic southern grandstand is re-equipped with seats to conform to FIFA regulations.

In 1974, the Westfalenstadion replaced the Stadion Rote Erde, which is located next door and serves now as the stadium of Borussia Dortmund II. After the increasing popularity of Borussia Dortmund in the 1960s, it became obvious that the traditional ground was too small for the increasing number of Borussia Dortmund supporters. The city of Dortmund, however, was not able to finance a new stadium and federal institutions were unwilling to help. But in 1971, Dortmund was selected to replace the city of Cologne, which was forced to withdraw its plans to host games in the 1974 World Cup. The funds originally set aside for the projected stadium in Cologne were thus re-allocated to Dortmund, and a new stadium became reality.

The Westfalenstadion has undergone several renovations throughout the years to increase the size of the stadium, including an expansion of the stadium for the 2006 World Cup. In 2008, the Borusseum, a museum about Borussia Dortmund, opened in the stadium. In 2011, Borussia Dortmund agreed to a partnership with Q-Cells. The company installed 8,768 solar cells on the roof of the Westfalenstadion to generate up to 860,000 kWh per year.

Borussia Dortmund has the highest average attendance of any football club worldwide. In 2014, it was estimated that each of the club's home games was attended by around 1,000 British spectators, drawn to the team by its low ticket prices compared to the Premier League.

=== Training ground ===
Borussia Dortmund's training ground and academy base Hohenbuschei is located in Brackel, a district of Dortmund. Inside the complex, there are physical fitness and rehabilitation robotics areas, physiotherapy and massage rooms, and remedial and hydrotherapy pools. The facility also includes sauna rooms, steam rooms and weight rooms, classrooms, conference halls, offices for the BVB front office, a restaurant, and a TV studio to interview the BVB professional footballers and coaching staff for BVB total!, the channel owned by the club. On the grounds, there are five grass pitches, two of which have under-soil heating, one artificial grass field, three small grass pitches and a multi-functional sports arena. The site covers a total area of 18,000 m^{2} (190,000 sq ft). In addition, the club owns a Footbonaut, a training robot, which is effectively a 14 m^{2} (150 sq ft) training cage.

The training complex and youth performance centre, located in Hohenbuschei, will be expanded in stages until 2021. In addition, the Sports Business Office will be entirely rebuilt from scratch. The planned construction, which will cost up to 20 million euros, will make BVB the best-equipped football club in the country with regards to infrastructure.

In the Strobelallee Training Centre, the BVB Evonik Football Academy has an outstanding training venue exclusively at its disposal. Among others, the Bundesliga-team used to prepare for their matches on the club's former training ground.

== Organisation and finance ==
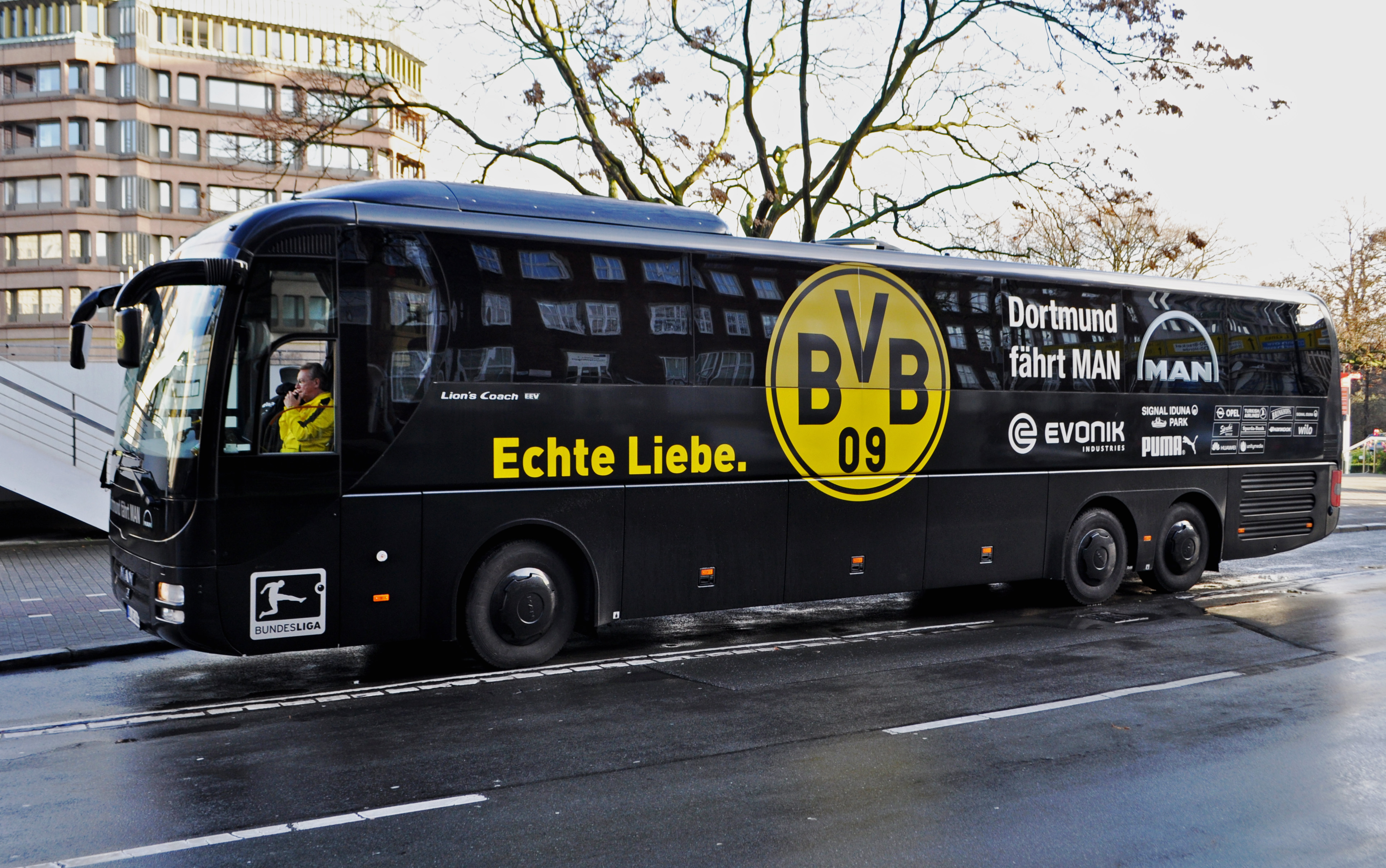
The Borussia Dortmund team bus provided by sponsor MAN

Borussia Dortmund e.V. is represented by its management board and a board of directors consisting of president Dr. Reinhard Rauball, his proxy and vice-president Gerd Pieper, and treasurer Dr. Reinhold Lunow.

Professional football at Dortmund is run by the organisation Borussia Dortmund GmbH & Co. KGaA. This corporation model has two types of participators: at least one partner with unlimited liability and at least one partner with limited liability. The investment of the latter is divided into stocks. The organisation Borussia Dortmund GmbH is the partner with unlimited liability and is responsible for the management and representation of Borussia Dortmund GmbH & Co. KGaA. Borussia Dortmund GmbH is fully owned by the sports club, Borussia Dortmund e.V. This organizational structure was designed to ensure that the sports club has full control over the professional squad.

The stock of Borussia Dortmund GmbH & Co. KGaA was floated on the stock market in October 2000 and is listed in the General Standard of Deutsche Börse AG. Borussia Dortmund GmbH & Co. KGaA became the first and, so far, the only publicly traded sports club on the German stock market. 4.61% of Borussia Dortmund GmbH & Co. KGaA is owned by the sports club, Borussia Dortmund e.V.; 8.24% by Bernd Geske; and 67.24% widely spread shareholdings. Hans-Joachim Watzke is the CEO and Thomas Treß is the CFO of the GmbH & Co. KGaA. Michael Zorc as sporting director is responsible for the first team, the coaching staff, the youth and junior section, and scouting. The supervisory board consists, among others, of politicians Werner Müller and Peer Steinbrück.

According to the 2015 Deloitte's annual Football Money League, BVB generated revenues of €262 million during the 2013–14 season. This figure excludes player transfer fees, VAT and other sales-related taxes.

| Season | 2014–15 | 2015–16 | 2016–17 | 2017–18 | 2018–19 | 2019–20 | 2020–21 | 2021–22 | 2022–23 | 2023–24 |
|---|---|---|---|---|---|---|---|---|---|---|
| Total revenue (€ mn.) | 276 | 376 | 406 | 536 | 490 | 410 | 350 | 414 | 491 | 607 |
| Net profit (€ mn.) | 5 | 29 | 8 | 28 | 17 | −44 | −73 | −33 | 11 | 49 |
| Total Assets (€ mn.) | 387 | 425 | 479 | 478 | 500 | 518 | 451 | 455 | 512 | 590 |
| Total Equity (€ mn.) | 286 | 310 | 312 | 336 | 355 | 305 | 233 | 281 | 283 | 327 |
| Number of employees | | | | 804 | 833 | 902 | 806 | 827 | 923 | 1,017 |

The shareholder structure of Borussia Dortmund GmbH & Co. KGaA
1. Free float 67.24 (64.3%)
2. Bernd Geske 8.24 (7.88%)
3. Evonik Industries AG 8.19 (7.83%)
4. SIGNAL IDUNA 5.98 (5.72%)
5. PUMA SE 5.32 (5.09%)
6. Ralph Dommermuth Beteiligungen GmbH 5.03 (4.81%)
7. BVB 09 e.V. Dortmund 4.61 (4.41%)

=== Current management and board ===
As of 1 January 2023

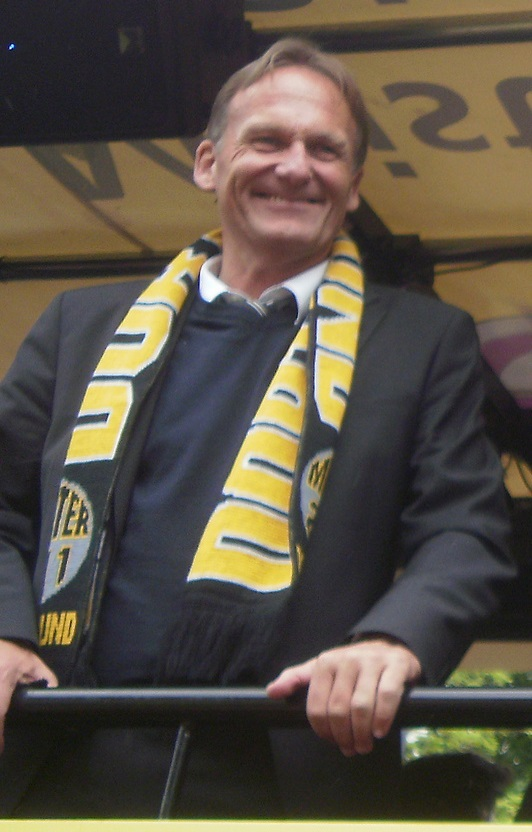
Chairman Aki Watzke

Borussia Dortmund GmbH & Co. KGaA
| Member | Position |
|---|---|
| Hans-Joachim Watzke | Chairman of the management managing director for sport, communications and human resources |
| Carsten Cramer | Managing director for sales, marketing and digitalization |
| Thomas Treß | Managing director for organisation, finance and facilities |
| Sebastian Kehl | Segment director for sport |
| Sascha Fligge | Segment director for communications |
| Corinna Timmermann | Segment director for human resources |
| Dr. Christian Hockenjos | Segment director for organisation |
| Mark Stahlschmidt | Segment director for finance and facilities |
Supervisory board
| Member | Note |
| Christian Kullmann | Chairman of the supervisory board Chairman of the executive board of Evonik Industries, Essen |
| Ulrich Leitermann | Vice chairman and chairman of the managing boards of group parent companies of the Signal Iduna Group |
| Judith Dommermuth | Managing partner of JUVIA Verwaltungs GmbH, Cologne |
| Bernd Geske | Managing partner of Bernd Geske Lean Communication, Meerbusch; Major shareholder of Borussia Dortmund GmbH & Co. KGaA |
| Bodo Löttgen | Member in the state parliament (Landtag) of North Rhine-Westphalia |
| Dr. Reinhold Lunow | Internist, medical director and partner of Internistische Naturheilkundliche Gemeinschaftspraxis, Bornheim treasurer of Ballspielverein Borussia 09 e. V. Dortmund since 20 November 2005 |
| Dr. Bernhard Pellens | Professor of International Corporate Accounting at Ruhr University Bochum; Academic Director of the Institute of Management (ifu) at Ruhr University Bochum; Honorary Professor at Tongji University in Shanghai, China |
| Silke Seidel | Chief executive officer of Dortmunder Stadtwerke Aktiengesellschaft; Managing Director of Hohenbuschei Beteiligungsgesellschaft mbH, Westfalentor 1 GmbH and Dortmund Logistik GmbH |

== Kits and sponsorship ==
Dortmund's main advertising partner and current shirt sponsor is Vodafone, not Evonik. Since the 2012–13 season, the main equipment supplier has been Puma. The contract is currently valid. The club announced a deal with Opel to be the first-ever sleeve sponsor from the 2017–18 season.

In addition, there are three different levels of partners: BVBChampionPartner includes, among others, Opel, bwin, Brinkhoff's, Wilo, Hankook and EA Sports; BVBPartner includes, among others, MAN, Eurowings, Coca-Cola, Ruhr Nachrichten, REWE and Aral; and BVBProduktPartner includes, among others, ofo, Westfalenhallen and TEDi.

Since 2012, Brixental in the Kitzbühel Alps in Austria is a BVB sponsor as well; furthermore, the region is host of one of the annual summer training camps.

=== Sponsors ===
Manufacturer
| Period | Brand | Source |
| 1974–1990 | Adidas | |
| 1990–2000 | Nike | |
| 2000–2004 | Goool.de | |
| 2004–2009 | Nike | |
| 2009–2012 | Kappa | |
| 2012– | Puma | |

Shirt Sponsor
| Period | Sponsor | Source |
| 1974–1976 | City of Dortmund | |
| 1976–1978 | Samson | |
| 1978–1980 | Prestolith | |
| 1980–1983 | UHU | |
| 1983–1986 | Arctic | |
| 1986–1997 | Die Continentale | |
| 1997–2000 | s.Oliver | |
| 2000–2006 | E.ON | |
| 2006–2007 | ! | |
| 2007–2020 | Evonik | |
| 2020–2025 | 1&1 Ionos (Bundesliga matches only); Evonik (DFB Pokal and UEFA competitions only) | |

Sleeve Sponsor
| Period | Sponsor | Source |
| 2017–2022 | Opel | |
| 2022 – | GLS | |

1: As a result of restructuring, the RAG business areas of chemicals, energy and real estate were transferred to a new business entity, but the company name was still unknown at that time. Placeholder in 2005–2006 was an artwork of an exclamation mark of the painter Otmar Alt.

== Controversy ==
Shortly before the end of the 2023–24 season, BVB management announced that the military weapons manufacturer Rheinmetall would be joining as a sponsor. The BVB fan council criticized the decision and was not previously informed by BVB GmbH. Borussia Dortmund's fan department published a statement denying media reports that there was a democratic agreement or even a vote by the fans in connection with the Rheinmetall deal.

Thomas Kessen, spokesman for the Unser Kurve fan alliance, clearly criticized the deal. "Here you have to say, it's basically the same mechanism as in Qatar. It's sportswashing," said Kessen. "Rheinmetall is happy to be able to paint a little black and yellow on blood-soaked names. And Aki Watzke is happy about several million in income. It can't be beaten in terms of shabbiness."

Federal minister Robert Habeck (A90/Greens) justified a football club's deal with Rheinmetall and said that we live in a dangerous world and that the "understandable reluctance" in public dealings with the arms industry is no longer tenable and correct.

== Charity ==
Borussia Dortmund has raised money for charity for various causes. On 17 May 2011, Borussia Dortmund held a charity game for the 2011 Japan earthquake and tsunami against "Team Japan". Ticket sales from the game and €1 million from Dortmund's main sponsor Evonik went to charity for Japan earthquake and tsunami victims. In November 2012, Borussia Dortmund KGaA founded a charitable trust called leuchte auf, to give important social projects financial help. The trust's logo is a star consisting of the streets which meet at Dortmund's Borsigplatz, where the club was founded. On 6 July 2013, Borussia Dortmund held a charity game to raise money for 2013 German flood victims in the German states of Saxony and Saxony-Anhalt.

In March 2020, Borussia Dortmund, Bayern Munich, RB Leipzig, and Bayer Leverkusen, the four German UEFA Champions League teams for the 2019–20 season, collectively gave €20 million to Bundesliga and 2. Bundesliga teams that were struggling financially during the COVID-19 pandemic.

Since 1996, during Advent, Borussia Dortmund players visit the children's hospital in Dortmund where the players meet with the patients and give them gifts.

== Players ==
=== Current squad ===
As of 1 September 2026

Note: Flags indicate national team as defined under FIFA eligibility rules; some limited exceptions apply. Players may hold more than one non-FIFA nationality.

| No. | Pos. | Nation | Player |
|---|---|---|---|
| 1 | GK | SUI | Gregor Kobel |
| 3 | DF | GER | Waldemar Anton (third captain) |
| 4 | DF | GER | Nico Schlotterbeck (vice-captain) |
| 5 | DF | ALG | Ramy Bensebaini |
| 7 | MF | ENG | Jobe Bellingham |
| 8 | MF | GER | Felix Nmecha |
| 9 | FW | GUI | Serhou Guirassy |
| 14 | MF | GER | Maximilian Beier |
| 17 | MF | AUT | Carney Chukwuemeka |
| 18 | MF | ENG | Ethan Nwaneri (on loan from Arsenal) |
| 19 | MF | GRE | Konstantinos Karetsas |
| 20 | MF | AUT | Marcel Sabitzer |
| 21 | FW | POR | Fábio Silva |
| 22 | DF | FRA | Joane Gadou |
| 23 | MF | GER | Emre Can (captain) |

| No. | Pos. | Nation | Player |
|---|---|---|---|
| 24 | DF | SWE | Daniel Svensson |
| 25 | MF | NED | Joey Veerman |
| 26 | DF | NOR | Julian Ryerson |
| 28 | MF | ECU | Justin Lerma |
| 30 | GK | GER | Patrick Drewes |
| 31 | GK | GER | Silas Ostrzinski |
| 33 | GK | GER | Alexander Meyer |
| 36 | DF | BRA | Kauã Prates |
| 39 | DF | ITA | Filippo Mane |
| 40 | FW | ITA | Samuele Inácio |
| 41 | FW | USA | Mathis Albert |
| 44 | MF | LUX | Enzo dos Santos |
| 45 | MF | GRE | Giannis Konstantelias |
| 48 | MF | GER | Mussa Kaba |
| 49 | DF | ITA | Luca Reggiani |

=== Out on loan ===
Note: Flags indicate national team as defined under FIFA eligibility rules; some limited exceptions apply. Players may hold more than one non-FIFA nationality.

| No. | Pos. | Nation | Player |
|---|---|---|---|
| 2 | DF | BRA | Yan Couto (at Como until 30 June 2027) |
| 32 | GK | GER | Diant Ramaj (at Copenhagen until 30 June 2027) |

| No. | Pos. | Nation | Player |
|---|---|---|---|
| 42 | DF | GER | Almugera Kabar (at NEC until 30 June 2027) |
| 47 | DF | ALG | Elias Benkara (at Greuther Fürth until 30 June 2027) |

=== Club captains ===
Since 1963, 19 players have held the position of club captain for Borussia Dortmund. The first club captain after the introduction of the Bundesliga was Alfred Schmidt, who was captain from 1963 to 1965. The longest-serving captain Michael Zorc, who was club captain from 1988 to 1998, has the distinction of having won the most trophies as captain; he won two Bundesliga titles, one DFB-Pokal, three DFL-Supercups and one UEFA Champions League. The current club captain is Emre Can, who took over after Marco Reus stepped down from his role as the club's captain for the 2023–24 season.

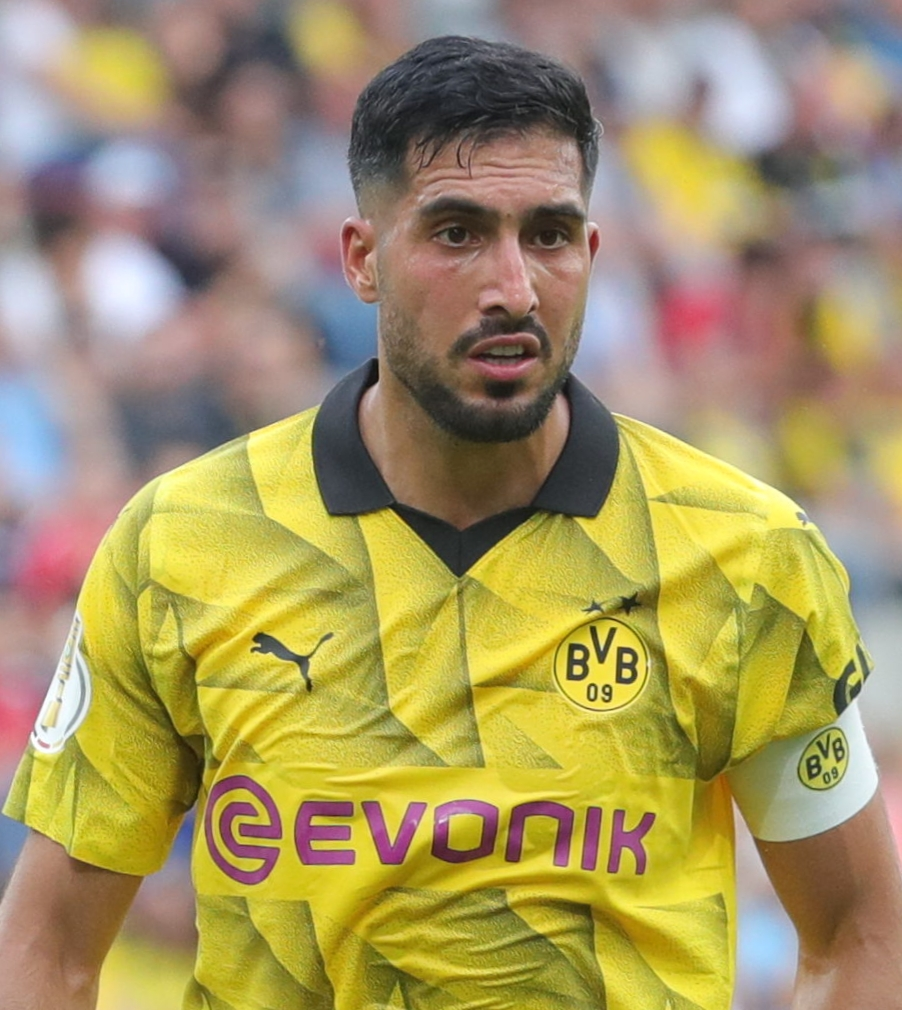
Emre Can, the current club captain

| Dates | Player | Notes |
|---|---|---|
| 1963–1965 | (Germany) Alfred Schmidt | First club captain in the Bundesliga era |
| 1965–1968 | (Germany) Wolfgang Paul | |
| 1968–1971 | (Germany) Sigfried Held | |
| 1971–1974 | (Germany) Dieter Kurrat | |
| 1974–1977 | (Germany) Klaus Ackermann | |
| 1977–1979 | (Germany) Lothar Huber | |
| 1979–1983 | (Germany) Manfred Burgsmüller | |
| 1983–1985 | (Germany) Rolf Rüssmann | |
| 1985–1987 | (Germany) Dirk Hupe | |
| 1987–1988 | (Germany) Frank Mill | |
| 1988–1998 | (Germany) Michael Zorc | Longest-serving captain in Borussia Dortmund's history |
| 1998–2003 | (Germany) Stefan Reuter | |
| 2003–2004 | (Germany) Christoph Metzelder | |
| 2004–2008 | (Germany) Christian Wörns | |
| 2008–2014 | (Germany) Sebastian Kehl | |
| 2014–2016 | (Germany) Mats Hummels | |
| 2016–2018 | (Germany) Marcel Schmelzer | |
| 2018–2023 | (Germany) Marco Reus | |
| 2023– | (Germany) Emre Can | |

== Non-playing staff ==
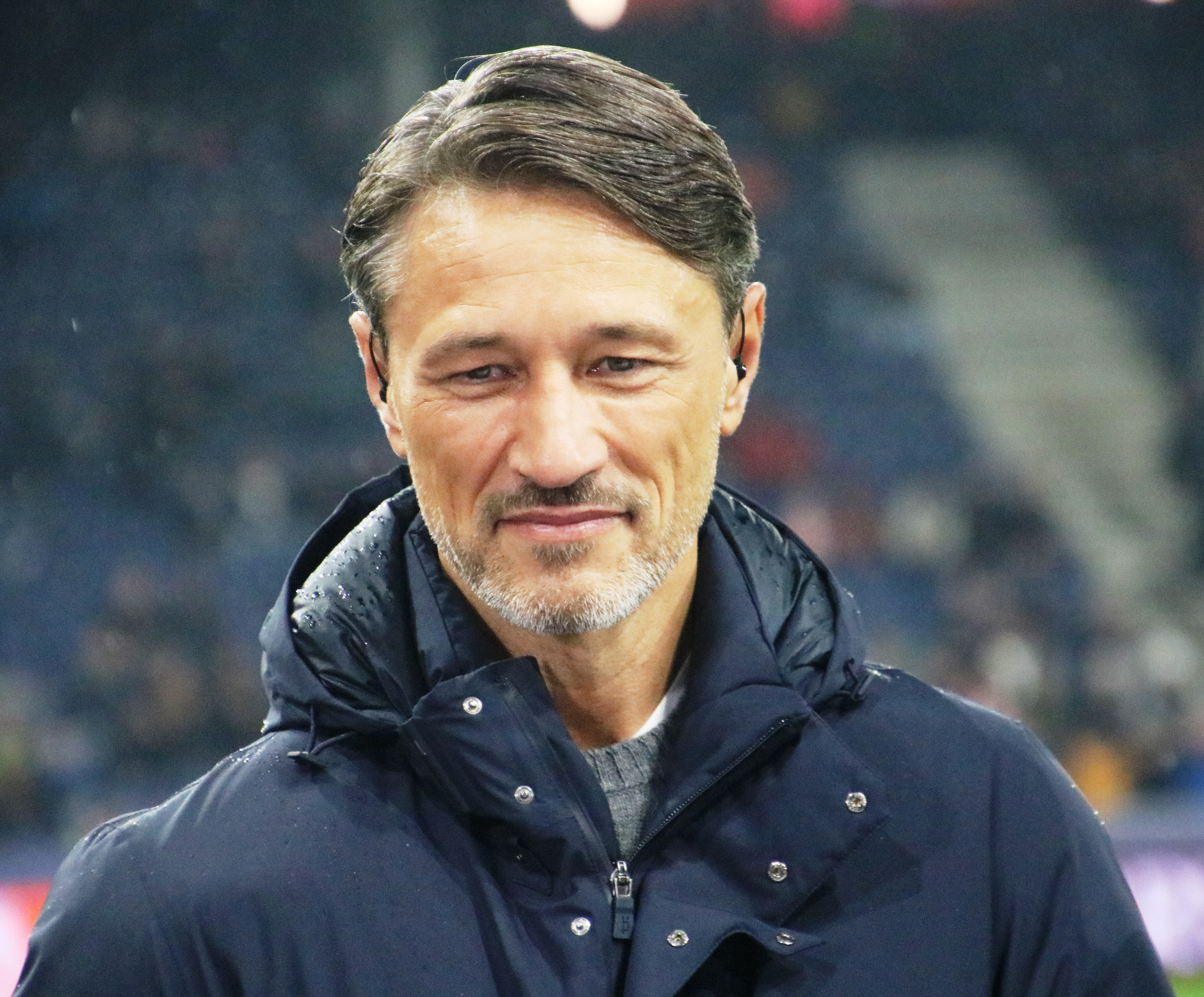
Head coach Niko Kovač

As of 2 February 2025

| Name | Position | Source |
Coaching staff
| (Croatia) Niko Kovač | Head coach | |
| (Croatia) Robert Kovač (Croatia) Filip Tapalović | Assistant coach | |
| (England) Stephen Rands | First-team coach | |
| (Germany) Matthias Kleinsteiber (Germany) Jan Reckert | Goalkeeper coach | |
Athletic department
| (Germany) Mathias Kolodziej | Athletic coach | |
| (Germany) Dennis Morschel | Athletic coach | |
| (Brazil) Marcelo Martins | Athletic coach | |
| (Germany) Andreas Gerg | Athletic coach | |
| (Germany) Noah Tegatz | Athletic coach | |
| (Austria) Georg Schulz | Athletic coach | |
Medical department
| (Germany) Dr. Markus Braun (Germany) Dr. Lars Lippelt (Germany) Dr. Daniel Hirte | First team doctor | |
| (Germany) Thorben Voeste | Physiotherapist | |
| (Germany) Bjarne Bürgel | Physiotherapist | |
| (Germany) Peter Kuhnt | Physiotherapist | |
| (Germany) Frank Zöllner | Physiotherapist | |
| (Germany) Michael Becker | Physiotherapist | |
| (Germany) Michael Arndt | Osteopath | |
| (Germany) Dr. Philipp Laux | Sport psychologist | |
| (Germany) Mathias Kolodziej (Germany) Tim Kübel | Sports scientist | |
| (Germany) Marius Kirmse | Nutritionist | |
| (Germany) Sebastian Märker | Lead academy physiotherapist | |
| (Germany) Dennis Morschel | Rehabilitation coach | |
| (Germany) Andreas Gerg | Rehabilitation coach | |
Scouting & recruitment
| (Germany) Arne Niehörster | Team manager | |
| (Germany) Kai-Norman Schulz | Coordinator sports technology | |
| (Bosnia and Herzegovina) Mario Barić | Chief analyst | |
| (Germany) Serdar Ayar (Germany) Frank Rutemöller | Match analyst | |
| (Germany) Bastian Schulz | Head of scouting | |
| (France) Laurent Busser (Germany) Sebastian Krug | Chief scout | |
| (Germany) Thomas Schramm | Scout | |
| (Germany) Serdar Ayar | Scout | |
| (Germany) Benjamin Frank | Scout | |
| (Germany) Alen Terzić | Scout | |
| (Portugal) Miguel Moreira | Scout | |
| (Germany) Dustin Heun | Scout | |
| (Germany) Jan Heidermann | Scout | |
| (Germany) Konstantin Georgiadis | Scout | |
| (Germany) Heiner Finke | Youth chief scout | |
Organisation & management
| (Germany) Lars Ricken | Managing director sport | |
| (Germany) Ole Book | Sporting director | |
| (Germany) Ingo Preuß | Head of reserve-team football | |
| (Germany) Wolfgang Springer | Head of youth department | |
| (Germany) Matthias Sammer | External advisor | |
| (Singapore) Suresh Letchmanan | Head of BVB Asia Pacific Pte. Ltd. | |
| (Germany) Benjamin Wahl | Head of BVB China | |
| (Germany) Patrick Owomoyela | International ambassador | |
| (Germany) Karl-Heinz Riedle | International ambassador | |
| (Germany) Roman Weidenfeller | International ambassador | |
| (Germany) Norbert Dickel | Stadium announcer | |
| (Germany) Sigfried Held | Supporter liaison officer | |
| (Germany) Frank Gräfen | Kit manager | |

=== Head coaches ===
In July 1935, Fritz Thelen became the club's first full-time head coach, but was not available in the first months of the season, forcing Dortmund player and Germany international Ernst Kuzorra to take over instead. In 1966, Willi Multhaup led his side to the European Cup Winners' Cup, the first German team to win a European trophy. Horst Köppel was the coach to bring major silverware to the club for the first time in over 20 years, winning the DFB-Pokal in 1989.

Ottmar Hitzfeld is the club's most successful coach, having won both the Bundesliga and Supercup twice. In 1997, Dortmund had waited for continental success for over 30 years; Hitzfeld crowned his period with an unexpected triumph and won the Champions League. Dortmund won the Intercontinental Cup in 1997 and head coach Nevio Scala became the first and, so far, only non-native speaker to win a major title. In 2001–02, Matthias Sammer, a former BVB player, brought the league title back to Dortmund. In 2008–09, the club approached Mainz 05 head coach Jürgen Klopp. He won the club's seventh championship title in 2010–11. In his fourth season, Dortmund won the Bundesliga and the DFB-Pokal to complete the first league and cup double in the club's history. Successor Thomas Tuchel won the 2016–17 DFB-Pokal.

On 22 May 2018, Lucien Favre was confirmed as the new head coach of the club for the 2018–19 season. He won the 2019 DFL-Supercup on 3 August 2019.

On 12 December 2020, Dortmund suffered a 5–1 defeat against VfB Stuttgart. Favre was fired the next day.

| No. | Nationality | Head coach | From | Until | Honours won |
|---|---|---|---|---|---|
| 1 | (Germany) | Ernst Kuzorra (interim) | July 1935 | Aug 1935 | |
| 2 | (Germany) | Fritz Thelen | Sept 1935 | June 1936 | |
| 3 | (Germany) | Ferdinand Swatosch | July 1936 | May 1939 | |
| 4 | (Germany) | Willi Sevcik | June 1939 | unknown | |
| 5 | (Germany) | Fritz Thelen | 10 January 1946 | 31 July 1946 | |
| 6 | (Germany) | Ferdinand Fabra | 1 August 1946 | 31 July 1948 | 1 Oberliga West |
| 7 | (Austria) | Eduard Havlicek | 1 August 1948 | 31 July 1950 | 2 Oberliga West |
| 8 | (Germany) | Hans-Josef Kretschmann | 1 August 1950 | 31 July 1951 | |
| 9 | (Germany) | Hans Schmidt | 1 August 1951 | 31 July 1955 | 1 Oberliga West |
| 10 | (Germany) | Helmut Schneider | 1 August 1955 | 31 July 1957 | 2 Oberliga West, 2 Championships |
| 11 | (Germany) | Hans Tauchert | 1 August 1957 | 24 June 1958 | |
| 12 | (Austria) | Max Merkel | 14 July 1958 | 31 July 1961 | |
| 13 | (Germany) | Hermann Eppenhoff | 1 August 1961 | 30 June 1965 | 1 Championship, 1 Cup |
| 14 | (Germany) | Willi Multhaup | 1 July 1965 | 30 June 1966 | 1 European Cup Winners' Cup |
| 15 | (Germany) | Heinz Murach | 1 July 1966 | 10 April 1968 | |
| 16 | (Germany) | Oswald Pfau | 18 April 1968 | 16 December 1968 | |
| 17 | (Germany) | Helmut Schneider | 17 December 1968 | 17 March 1969 | |
| 18 | (Germany) | Hermann Lindemann | 21 March 1969 | 30 June 1970 | |
| 19 | (Germany) | Horst Witzler | 1 July 1970 | 21 December 1971 | |
| 20 | (Germany) | Herbert Burdenski | 3 January 1972 | 30 June 1972 | |
| 21 | (Germany) | Detlev Brüggemann | 1 July 1972 | 31 October 1972 | |
| 22 | (Germany) | Max Michallek | 1 November 1972 | 1 March 1973 | |
| 23 | (Germany) | Dieter Kurrat | 1 March 1973 | 30 June 1973 | |
| 24 | (Hungary) | János Bédl | 1 July 1973 | 14 February 1974 | |
| 25 | (Germany) | Dieter Kurrat | 14 February 1974 | 30 June 1974 | |
| 26 | (Germany) | Otto Knefler | 1 July 1974 | 1 February 1976 | |
| 27 | (Germany) | Horst Buhtz | 1 February 1976 | 30 June 1976 | |
| 28 | (Germany) | Otto Rehhagel | 1 July 1976 | 30 April 1978 | |
| 29 | (Germany) | Carl-Heinz Rühl | 1 July 1978 | 29 April 1979 | |
| 30 | (Germany) | Uli Maslo | 30 April 1979 | 30 June 1979 | |
| 31 | (Germany) | Udo Lattek | 1 July 1979 | 10 May 1981 | |
| 32 | (Germany) | Rolf Bock (interim) | 11 May 1981 | 30 June 1981 | |
| 33 | (Socialist Federal Republic of Yugoslavia) | Branko Zebec | 1 July 1981 | 30 June 1982 | |
| 34 | (Germany) | Karl-Heinz Feldkamp | 1 July 1982 | 5 April 1983 | |
| 35 | (Germany) | Helmut Witte (interim) | 6 April 1983 | 30 June 1983 | |
| 36 | (Germany) | Uli Maslo | 1 July 1983 | 23 October 1983 | |
| 37 | (Germany) | Helmut Witte (interim) | 23 October 1983 | 31 October 1983 | |
| 38 | (Germany) | Heinz-Dieter Tippenhauer | 31 October 1983 | 15 November 1983 | |
| 39 | (Germany) | Horst Franz | 16 November 1983 | 30 June 1984 | |
| 40 | (Germany) | Timo Konietzka | 1 July 1984 | 24 October 1984 | |
| 41 | (Germany) | Reinhard Saftig (interim) | 25 October 1984 | 27 October 1984 | |
| 42 | (Germany) | Erich Ribbeck | 28 October 1984 | 30 June 1985 | |
| 43 | (Hungary) | Pál Csernai | 1 July 1985 | 20 April 1986 | |
| 44 | (Germany) | Reinhard Saftig | 21 April 1986 | 30 June 1988 | |
| 45 | (Germany) | Horst Köppel | 1 July 1988 | 30 June 1991 | 1 Cup, 1 Supercup |
| 46 | (Germany) | Ottmar Hitzfeld | 1 July 1991 | 30 June 1997 | 2 Championships, 2 Supercups, 1 Champions League |
| 47 | (Italy) | Nevio Scala | 1 July 1997 | 30 June 1998 | 1 Intercontinental Cup |
| 48 | (Germany) | Michael Skibbe | 1 July 1998 | 4 February 2000 | |
| 49 | (Austria) | Bernd Krauss | 6 February 2000 | 13 April 2000 | |
| 50 | (Germany) | Udo Lattek (interim) | 14 April 2000 | 30 June 2000 | |
| 51 | (Germany) | Matthias Sammer | 1 July 2000 | 30 June 2004 | 1 Championship |
| 52 | (Netherlands) | Bert van Marwijk | 1 July 2004 | 18 December 2006 | |
| 53 | (Germany) | Jürgen Röber | 19 December 2006 | 12 March 2007 | |
| 54 | (Germany) | Thomas Doll | 13 March 2007 | 19 May 2008 | |
| 55 | (Germany) | Jürgen Klopp | 1 July 2008 | 30 June 2015 | 2 Championships, 1 Cup, 2 Supercups |
| 56 | (Germany) | Thomas Tuchel | 1 July 2015 | 30 May 2017 | 1 Cup |
| 57 | (Netherlands) | Peter Bosz | 1 July 2017 | 10 December 2017 | |
| 58 | (Austria) | Peter Stöger | 10 December 2017 | 30 June 2018 | |
| 59 | (Switzerland) | Lucien Favre | 1 July 2018 | 13 December 2020 | 1 Supercup |
| 60 | (Germany) | Edin Terzić (interim) | 13 December 2020 | 30 June 2021 | 1 Cup |
| 61 | (Germany) | Marco Rose | 1 July 2021 | 20 May 2022 | |
| 62 | (Germany) | Edin Terzić | 23 May 2022 | 13 June 2024 | |
| 63 | (Turkey) | Nuri Şahin | 14 June 2024 | 22 January 2025 | |
| 64 | (Germany) | Mike Tullberg (interim) | 22 January 2025 | 2 February 2025 | |
| 65 | (Croatia) | Niko Kovač | 2 February 2025 | | |

== Records ==
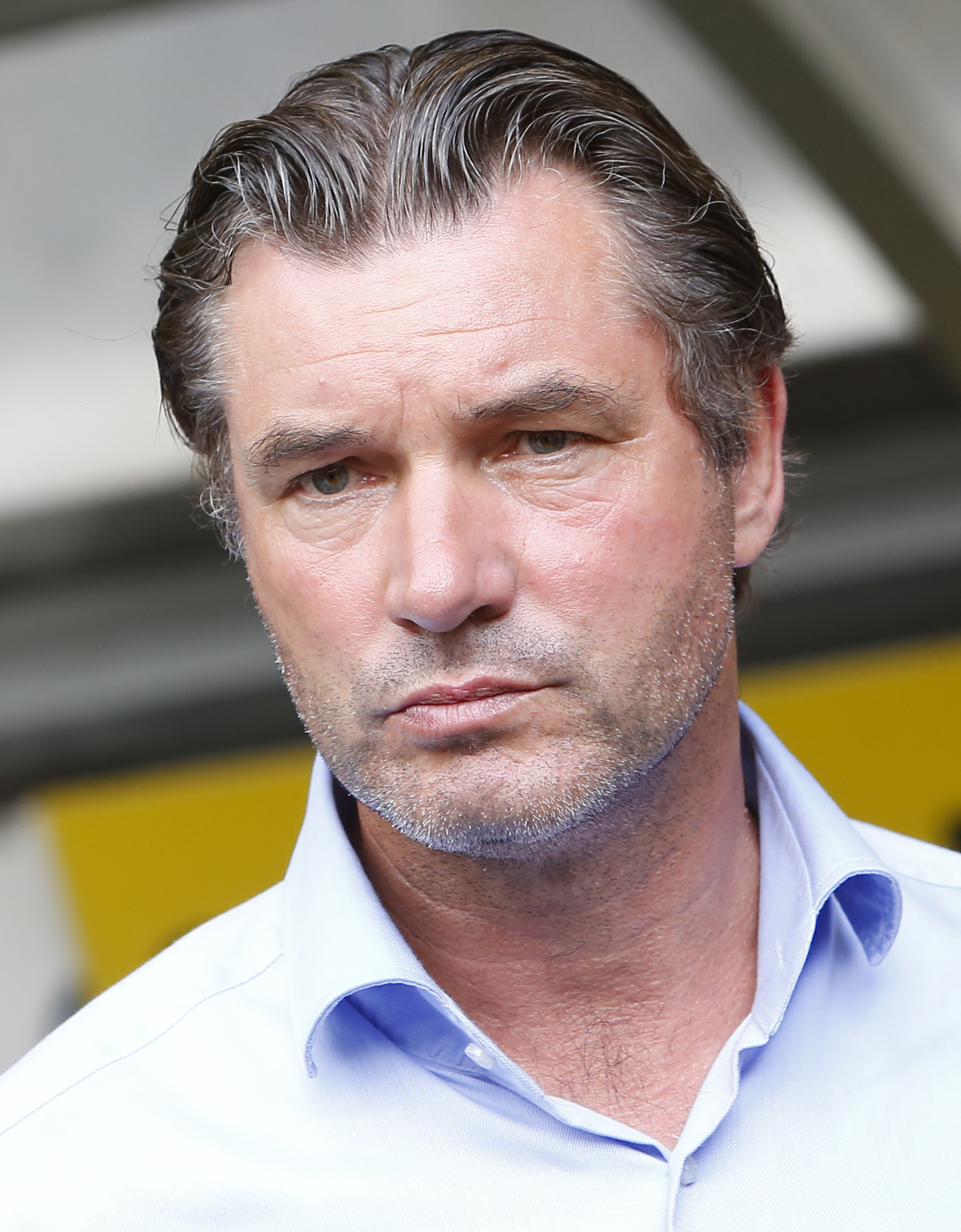
Michael Zorc has the most appearances for the club.

Borussia Dortmund's name is attached to a number of Bundesliga and European records:

- The Borussia Dortmund player with the most appearances is Michael Zorc, with 572 in all competitions.
- The Borussia Dortmund player with the most goals is Alfred Preissler, with 177 in all competitions.
- The most goals ever in a UEFA Champions League match (12) occurred when Dortmund beat Legia Warsaw 8–4 in the 2016–17 season.
- Youssoufa Moukoko became the youngest player in Bundesliga history (aged 16 years and 1 day) when he appeared for Borussia Dortmund against Hertha BSC on 21 November 2020.
- Moukoko also became the youngest player in UEFA Champions League history (aged 16 years and 18 days) when he was subbed on for Dortmund against Zenit Saint Petersburg on 8 December 2020.
- Moukoko became both the youngest goalscorer in Bundesliga history and the youngest player to score for Dortmund (aged 16 years and 28 days) after netting against Union Berlin on 18 December 2020.
- Dortmund was on the receiving end of the worst loss ever in a Bundesliga match when they suffered a 12–0 defeat away to Borussia Mönchengladbach on 29 April 1978.
- BVB and Bayern Munich were carded a record of 15 times (3 for Dortmund, 12 for Bayern) in a match played on 7 April 2001.
- The most penalties given in a Bundesliga match was five, in a game played between Borussia Mönchengladbach and Dortmund on 9 November 1965.
- The first goal ever scored in Bundesliga play was by Dortmund's Friedhelm Konietzka against Werder Bremen; however, Werder Bremen won 3–2.
- Former Borussia Dortmund striker Pierre-Emerick Aubameyang is one of only three players, the others being Klaus Allofs and Robert Lewandowski, to have scored at least once in ten straight Bundesliga matchdays. He was also the first player ever to score at least once in the first eight matchdays of a Bundesliga season, and formerly held the record for most Bundesliga goals in a single season by a foreign player (31 in 2016–17).

== Honours ==
| Type | Competition | Titles | Seasons |
|---|---|---|---|
| Domestic | German Champions/Bundesliga | 8 | 1956, 1957, 1963, 1994–95, 1995–96, 2001–02, 2010–11, 2011–12 |
| Domestic | DFB-Pokal | 5 | 1964–65, 1988–89, 2011–12, 2016–17, 2020–21 |
| Domestic | DFL-Supercup | 6 | 1989, 1995, 1996, 2013, 2014, 2019 |
| Continental | UEFA Champions League | 1 | 1996–97 |
| Continental | UEFA Cup Winners' Cup | 1 | 1965–66 |
| Worldwide | Intercontinental Cup | 1 | 1997 |

=== Regional ===
- Oberliga West/West German Championship:
  - Winners: 1947–48, 1948–49, 1949–50, 1952–53, 1955–56, 1956–57 (record)
  - Runners-up: 1960–61, 1962–63
- Westphalia Cup:
  - Winners: 1947

=== Individual trophies ===
Ballon d'Or

- 1996: Matthias Sammer

Golden Boy

- 2011: Mario Götze
- 2020: Erling Haaland
- 2023: Jude Bellingham

== UEFA club coefficient ranking ==
As of 8 May 2026

| Rank | Nation | Team | Points |
|---|---|---|---|
| 8 | (Spain) | Barcelona | 113.250 |
| 9 | (Germany) | Bayer Leverkusen | 105.000 |
| 10 | (Spain) | Atlético Madrid | 104.750 |
| 11 | (Germany) | Borussia Dortmund | 100.750 |
| 12 | (England) | Chelsea | 99.250 |
| 13 | (Italy) | Roma | 97.750 |
| 14 | (Portugal) | Benfica | 90.000 |

== Affiliated clubs ==
The following clubs are currently affiliated with Borussia Dortmund:

- (India) Hyderabad
- (Thailand) Buriram United
- (Australia) Marconi Stallions
- (Japan) Iwate Grulla Morioka
- (Vietnam) Hoa Binh
- (Canada) BVB International Academy Waterloo
- (Greece) Aris Thessalonikis
- (Indonesia) Persib Bandung
- (United States) Pittsburgh Steelers

== Women's team ==
Borussia Dortmund also has a women's team. The women's team currently competes in the Regionalliga, one of the regional leagues in the third tier of the German women's football league system.

== Bombing attack on the team bus ==
About ten days after the attack, police arrested Sergei Wenergold, who had purchased three financial derivatives known as put options and sought to profit from a fall in Borussia Dortmund's share price. According to federal police, the transaction could have earned him nearly €4 million. Capital described the incident as "the first stock market attack in history." In 2018, Wenergold was sentenced to 14 years in prison.

== See also ==
- Borussia Dortmund II
- Borussia Dortmund (women)
- Borussia Dortmund Youth Sector
- List of Borussia Dortmund seasons
- List of world champion football clubs
