= Katzbach =

Katzbach may refer to:

- Katzbach (Kraichbach), a river in Baden-Württemberg, Germany, tributary of the Kraichbach
- Katzbach (Schwarzach), a river of Bavaria, Germany, tributary of the Schwarzach being itself a tributary of the Naab
- Kaczawa (German: Katzbach), a river in the Lower Silesian Voivodeship in Poland
- Katzbach Mountains, a mountain range in the Western Sudetes in Poland
- Battle of the Katzbach, on 26 August 1813, a major battle of the Napoleonic Wars
- Katzbach Railway, a branch line in southwestern Germany
