= Stephen Rands =

English football coach and analyst

Personal information
- Full name: Stephen Rands
- Date of birth: 25 February 1985 (age 41)
- Place of birth: Hull, England

Team information
- Current team: Borussia Dortmund (first-team coach)

Managerial career
- Years: Team
- 2007–2008: Barnsley (analyst)
- 2008–2011: Scunthorpe United (head analyst)
- 2011–2018: Manchester City (head of analysis)
- 2018–2019: Derby County (coach-analyst)
- 2019–2021: Swansea City (head of analysis)
- 2021–2024: Nottingham Forest (chief analyst)
- 2024: Leicester City (first-team coach)
- 2025–: Borussia Dortmund (first-team coach)

Stephen "Steve" Rands (born 25 February 1985) is an English football coach and former performance analyst who currently serves as a first-team coach for Bundesliga club Borussia Dortmund.

He has held coaching and analytical roles at several English clubs, including Manchester City, Nottingham Forest, and Leicester City.

== Career ==
=== Early career ===
Rands began his career in 2007 at Barnsley. During his tenure, the club reached the FA Cup semi-finals (2007–08) with notable victories over Chelsea and Liverpool. In 2008, he moved to Scunthorpe United as Head Analyst. During his three-year period at the club, Scunthorpe reached the EFL Trophy final and achieved promotion to the EFL Championship via the play-offs in 2009.

=== Manchester City ===
Rands spent seven years at Manchester City (2011–2018), where he eventually served as Head of Analysis. During his time at the club, he contributed to three Premier League title-winning seasons under three different managers: Roberto Mancini (2011–12), Manuel Pellegrini (2013–14), and Pep Guardiola (2017–18). The club also achieved three EFL Cup successes during this period.

=== Derby County and Swansea City ===
In 2018, Rands joined Frank Lampard's staff at Derby County as a Coach-Analyst. Lampard praised his contribution, stating: "When it comes to analysis, I believe he is at the top, top end of his game." During this season, Derby reached the Championship play-off final.

Rands subsequently joined Steve Cooper at Swansea City, where the club achieved consecutive play-off finishes in 2020 and 2021.

=== Nottingham Forest and Leicester City ===
Rands followed Cooper to Nottingham Forest in 2021 as Chief Analyst. In his first season, the club achieved promotion to the Premier League via the Championship play-offs. In July 2024, he was appointed First Team Coach at Leicester City.

=== Borussia Dortmund ===
In February 2025, Rands moved to Bundesliga club Borussia Dortmund as a First Team Coach, joining the staff of manager Niko Kovač.

== Research and philosophy ==
Rands is an advocate for the "Coach-Analyst" model, which integrates tactical video analysis directly into pitch-side coaching. In 2022, he discussed the evolution of the role, arguing that the separation of these departments was becoming less common in elite football.

He has also contributed to academic literature on the subject. In 2022, he co-authored a peer-reviewed study in the Sports Innovation Journal titled "Assessing the Efficacy of Video Telestration in Aiding Memory Recall Among Elite Professional Football Players," which examined how visual tools enhance tactical retention.
