= Murach (Schwarzach) =

River in Germany

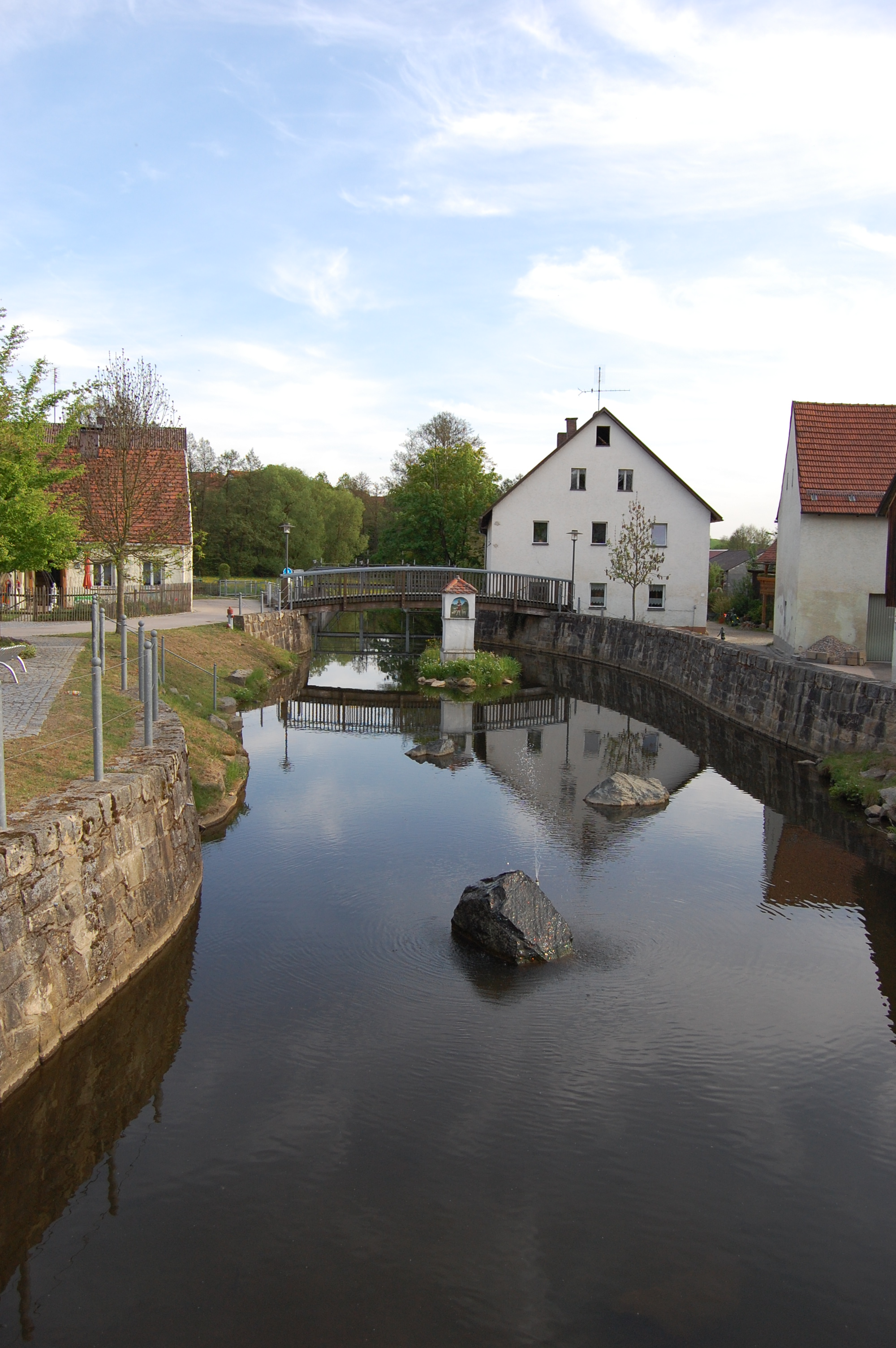
- The Murach in Teunz

Location
- Country: Germany
- State: Bavaria

Physical characteristics
- Mouth
  - location: Schwarzach
  - coordinates: 49.4001°N 12.3101°E
- Length: 34.0 km (21.1 mi)
- Basin size: 124 km^{2} (48 sq mi)

Basin features
- Progression: Schwarzach→ Naab→ Danube→ Black Sea

Murach is a river of Bavaria, Germany. It is a right tributary of the Schwarzach near Zangenstein (a part of Schwarzhofen).

== See also ==
- List of rivers of Bavaria
