= Katzbach (Schwarzach) =

River in Germany

Location
- Country: Germany
- State: Bavaria

Physical characteristics
- Source
  - location: West of Schömersdorf, a district of Teunz
  - coordinates: 49.4885°N 12.3355°E
- Mouth
  - location: At Willhof (a district of Altendorf) into the Schwarzach
  - coordinates: 49.4169°N 12.2660°E

Basin features
- Progression: Schwarzach→ Naab→ Danube→ Black Sea

Katzbach is a river of Bavaria, Germany.

The Katzbach springs west of Schömersdorf (a district of Teunz). It is a right tributary of the Schwarzach at Willhof (a district of Altendorf).

The Camino de Santiago leads past parts of the Katzbach.

== See also ==
- List of rivers of Bavaria
