= Heinz Murach =

German football coach (1926–2007)

Personal information
- Date of birth: 7 April 1926
- Place of birth: Gelsenkirchen, Germany
- Date of death: 8 May 2007 (aged 81)

Managerial career
- Years: Team
- 1966–1968: Borussia Dortmund
- 1968–1972: SG Eintracht Gelsenkirchen
- 1972: Rot-Weiß Oberhausen
- 1974: SpVgg Erkenschwick
- 1975–1976: SC Westfalia Herne

Heinz Murach (7 April 1926 – 8 May 2007) was a German football coach. In the late 1960s and early 1970s he was active in the Bundesliga with Borussia Dortmund and Rot-Weiß Oberhausen. In the later 1970s, he worked with SpVgg Erkenschwick and SC Westfalia Herne in the second division. In 1971, he led Eintracht Gelsenkirchen to the best result in the club's history.

== Career ==
Murach was born in Gelsenkirchen. He started his coaching career in August 1953 as the coach of Lower Saxony. From March 1956 until 1959 he worked with the Athletics Association Westphalia. He then was the coach of the football association Lower Rhine.

=== 1960s ===
He joined European Cup winners Borussia Dortmund in 1966 as the successor of Willi Multhaup. While coach of Borussia, the team roster included players such as Lothar Emmerich, Sigfried Held and Reinhard Libuda. They did not win the championship, but came third in the Bundesliga.

In the following Bundesliga season Borussia began well, but soon started to lose consistency. By mid-season Borussia was only in tenth place. In January 1968 Murach chose not to extend his contract. Murach led Borussia with a 2–1 home victory over Hertha BSC in the semi-finals of the DFB-Pokal, but in the subsequent Easter Tournament in Vienna, the team faced two consecutive defeats. Murach then resigned and was replaced by Oßwald Pfau. At the end of the season Borussia finished 14th.

=== 1970s ===
Murach then coached Eintracht Gelsenkirchen, which had fallen to the third division the previous season due to point deductions for the use of an unregistered player. He revived the team by leading it in 1971 to fifth place – the best finish in club history – and a year later to a safe mid-table.

On the 21st match day of the 1972–73 season, Murach was hired by the Bundesliga side Rot-Weiß Oberhausen and began coaching there in addition to his duties at Eintracht Gelsenkirchen. Murach followed Günter Brocker and Friedhelm Kobluhn, becoming the third coach that season. Despite Murach's leadership, Rot-Weiß Oberhausen remained last.

The following season, he remained with Rot-Weiß Oberhausen and led the club to second place in the Regionalliga West SG Wattenscheid 09, which entitled them to participate in the Bundesliga promotion round. There they finished in third place behind Tennis Borussia Berlin and FC Augsburg. They faced such a bad financial situation at that time that Murach obtained a legal attachment order to protect his salary.

Early in the 1974–75 season, Murach joined the second division SpVgg Erkenschwick. This engagement lasted only two weeks, however. SpVgg was only two points away from the relegation zone in the 14th place, and in November Murach was replaced by his predecessor Fritz Langner. Murach's last major engagement came in the 1975–76 season when he was hired by Westfalia Herne, also a second Bundesliga club. In the first season, he led the team to tenth place. The following season, he was replaced just after the start of the second half by Ivica Horvat, when Westfalia was only two points away from the relegation zone in 15th place. Horvat led the team to secure eleventh place.

Heinz Murach was a professional teacher at the Grillo-Gymnasium in Gelsenkirchen, where he lived after his retirement.

== Teams coached ==
- 1966–1968: Borussia Dortmund
- 1968–1972: SG Eintracht Gelsenkirchen
- 1972–1972: Rot-Weiß Oberhausen
- 1974–1974: SpVgg Erkenschwick
- 1975–1976: SC Westfalia Herne
