= Footbonaut =

Football training machine

The Footbonaut is a football training machine which fires balls at different speeds and trajectories at players, who must control and pass the ball into a highlighted square. In addition to honing ball skills, the machine is designed to improve a player's reaction time.

== Development ==
Footbonaut was invented by Christian Güttler in Berlin, Germany. The machine is also described as a robotic cage. The Footbanaut, which costs $3.5 million is as large as an apartment with a cube shape and is capable of firing balls from a range of 360 degrees at different speeds and trajectories toward the training players. The players, who are standing inside a circle, must control the ball and pass it through one of 72 gates.

Mario Götze's winning goal of the 2014 FIFA World Cup Final has been credited to his years of practice using Footbonaut. It was reported that German team TSG 1899 Hoffenheim achieved its highest finish in the Bundesliga for five years - ninth place - after using the contraption. There are three clubs currently using Footbonaut in their training.
