= Schwarzach (Naab) =

River in Germany

- The bridge Frankenthalbrücke over the Schwarzach

Location
- Countries: Germany; Czech Republic
- State (DE): Bavaria
- Region (CZ): Plzeň

Physical characteristics
- Mouth
  - location: Naab
  - coordinates: 49.3934°N 12.1529°E
- Length: 95.0 km (59.0 mi)
- Basin size: 841 km^{2} (325 sq mi)

Basin features
- Progression: Naab→ Danube→ Black Sea

Schwarzach (German pronunciation: [ˈʃvaʁtsax]; Czech: Nemanický potok) is a river of Czech Republic and Bavaria, Germany. It is a left tributary of the Naab. It passes through Waldmünchen, Rötz and Neunburg vorm Wald, and flows into the Naab near Schwarzenfeld.

== See also ==
- List of rivers of Bavaria
- List of rivers of the Czech Republic
