= FC Bayern Munich in international football =

German club in European football

FC Bayern Munich in international football competitions
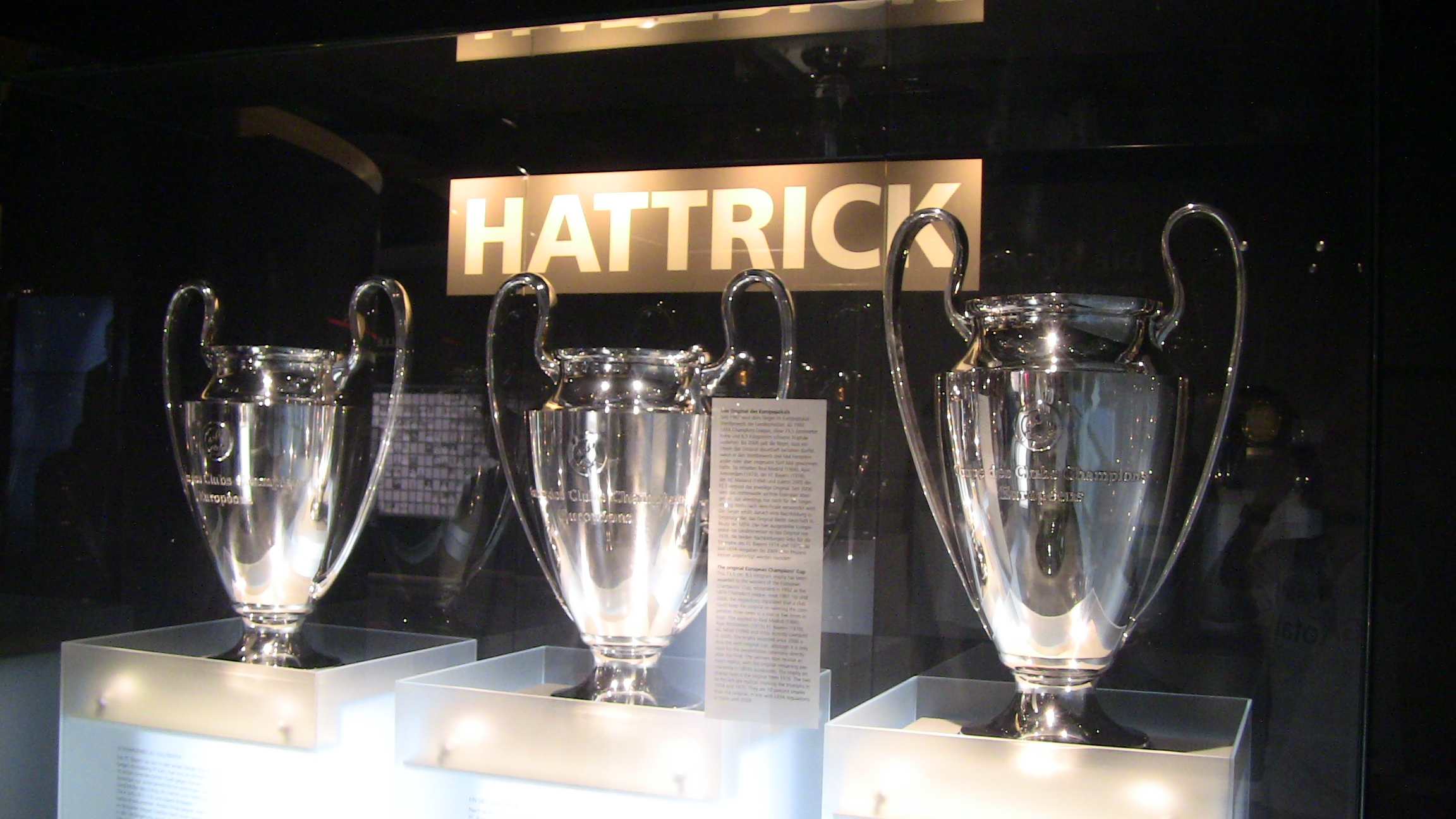
- The three consecutive European Cup trophies won by the club between 1974 and 1976, on display in the club's museum
- Club: FC Bayern Munich
- Seasons played: 59
- Most appearances: Thomas Müller (174)
- Top scorer: Robert Lewandowski (71)
- First entry: 1962–63 Inter-Cities Fairs Cup
- Latest entry: 2026–27 UEFA Champions League

Titles
- Champions League: 6: 1974; 1975; 1976; 2001; 2013; 2020
- Europa League: 1: 1996
- Cup Winners' Cup: 1: 1967
- Super Cup: 2: 2013; 2020
- Intercontinental Cup: 2: 1976; 2001
- FIFA Club World Cup: 2: 2013; 2020

Fußball-Club Bayern München e. V., commonly known as FC Bayern Munich or simply Bayern Munich, is an association football club based in the city of Munich in Bavaria, Germany. Founded in 1900, they have been competing in UEFA competitions since the 1960s and have become one of the most successful teams in Europe, winning eight major continental trophies including six European Cup/Champions League titles and are ranked joint third among all clubs across the continent in this regard. Bayern are by far Germany's most successful international representatives: no other teams from that nation have won Europe's premier competition more than once, or have more than two trophy wins overall.

By winning the Intercontinental Cup in 1976 and 2001, and the FIFA Club World Cup in 2013 and in 2020 (played in February 2021 due to the COVID-19 pandemic), Bayern were recognised as world champions of that year.

== History ==
=== 1960s ===
Bayern were not one of the major teams in West Germany in the years following the end of World War II and the partition of the nation, and had been treated unfavourably by the Nazi regime due to the Jewish origins of their founders prior to 1945. They were inaugural members of the Oberliga Süd in 1945 but never finished higher than 3rd in that region so were not eligible to compete for the overall championship, which gave access to the new European Cup from 1955. Bayern finished behind city rivals TSV 1860 Munich in the 1962–63 campaign and were not invited to join the nationwide Bundesliga which had was due to start the following season – the organisers invited other clubs who had finished lower as they did not want more than one entrant per city. However, the club did take part in a European competition for the first time in that 1962–63 season, reaching the quarter-finals of the Inter-Cities Fairs Cup (a non-UEFA competition which at that time was organised by invitation for clubs in cities which hosted trade fairs, although its qualification path later became more closely associated with placings in each national league and is considered the forerunner of the UEFA Cup). They had already won the national cup in 1956–57, but the European Cup Winners' Cup would not be introduced until three years later.

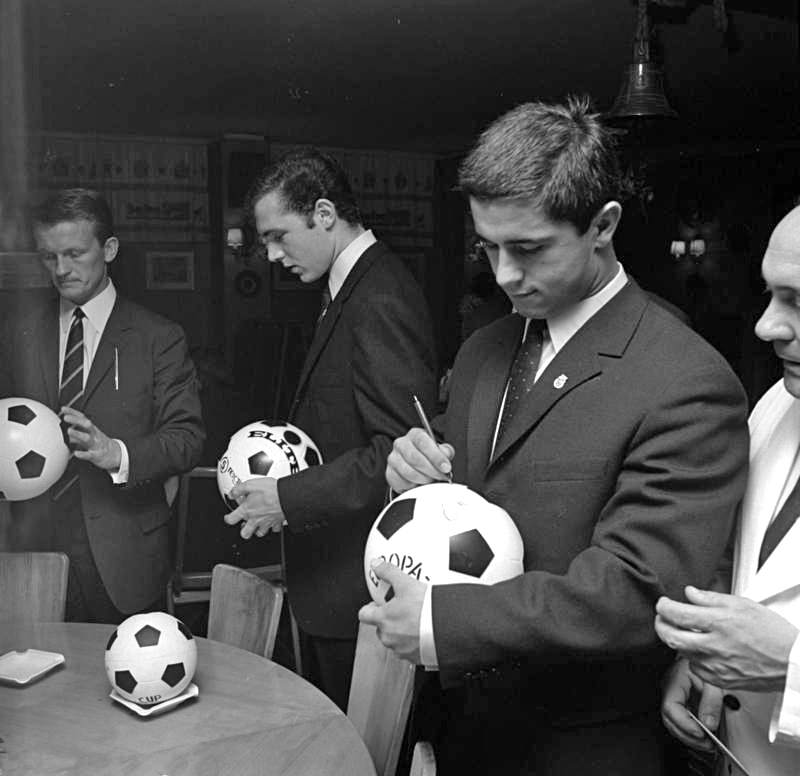
Bayern players Werner Olk, Franz Beckenbauer and Gerd Müller sign memorabilia following their win in the 1967 European Cup Winners' Cup Final

Under coach Zlatko Čajkovski, Bayern gained promotion to the Bundesliga for the 1965–66 season and finished third (1860 were champions). That year they also won the Cup again, so entered a UEFA competition for the first time, namely the 1966–67 European Cup Winners' Cup. They went on to lift that trophy, beating Scottish club Rangers 1–0 after extra time in the final. Bayern were fortunate in that the match was played in Bavaria, with the contest in Nuremberg (Franconia) being almost a home tie, and also benefitted from their opponents' chaotic preparations: Rangers had eliminated the holders and fellow Germans Borussia Dortmund in an earlier round, but had since dispensed with the services of two prolific forwards who took the blame for a shock defeat in the Scottish Cup in January 1967, instead relying on a converted defender who did not have the quality required to overcome the Bayern resistance. The winning side contained several young local talents – goalkeeper Sepp Maier, sweeper Franz Beckenbauer and striker Gerd Müller who would become recognised as world-class in their positions, plus midfielder Franz Roth (scorer of the only goal in 1967) and reserve defender Hans-Georg Schwarzenbeck – all of whom would be integral to the spell of great success about to be enjoyed by the club.

1967 European Cup Winners' Cup final

31 May 1967	Bayern Munich (West Germany)	1–0 (a.e.t.)	(Scotland) Rangers	Städtisches Stadion, Nuremberg
19:30	Roth 109'	Report		Attendance: 69,480; Referee: Concetto Lo Bello (Italy)

In their attempt to retain the Cup Winners' Cup, Bayern lost to eventual winners A.C. Milan in the semi-finals, but won their first double in 1969. They were eliminated from the 1969–70 European Cup at the first hurdle as French team Saint-Etienne overturned a 2–0 deficit from Germany to win 3–0 at their own stadium, contributing to the departure of head coach Branko Zebec (who was later acknowledged as having laid many of the foundations of what was to follow) - but also was said to be unstable due to a drinking problem. His successor Udo Lattek, who had been recommended to the club by Beckenbauer, recruited Paul Breitner and Uli Hoeneß, another two important additions to the squad. Ironically, it was Beckenbauer who blamed Lattek later on for "playing tennis with teammembers on the day of an important match which we lost consequently" (in the first of his "autobiographies", called "Einer wie ich"), and is thought to have masterminded the switch to Dietmar Cramer, his former coach at age 17 in the "Youth National Team".

=== 1970s ===
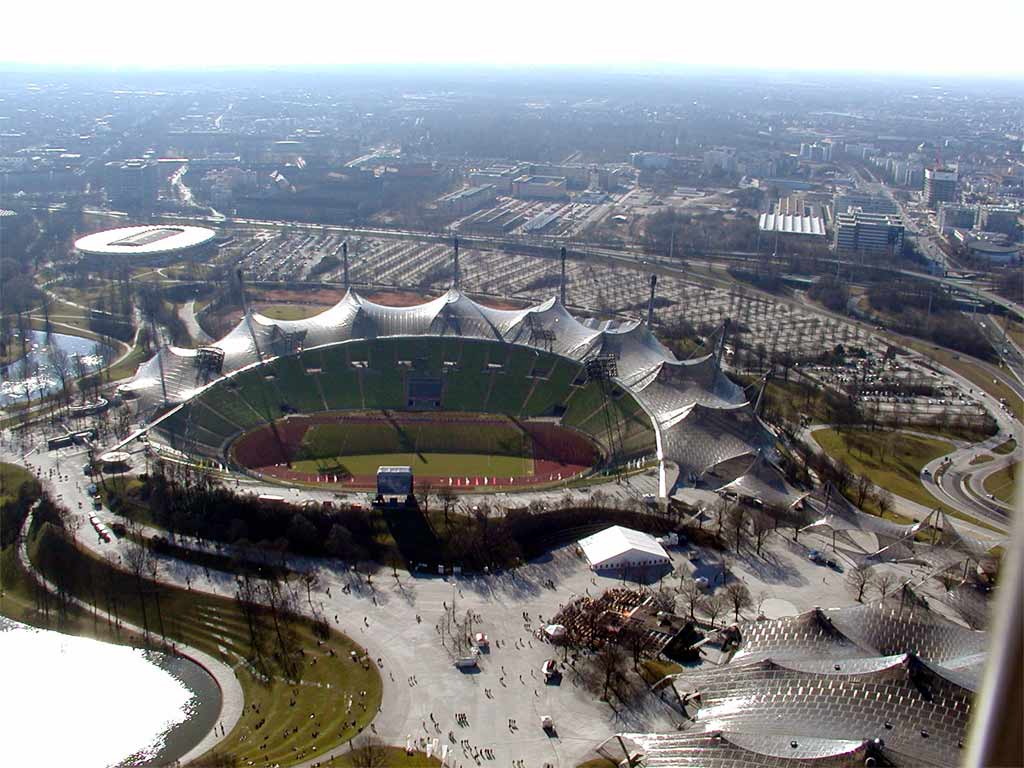
Bayern moved into the Olympiastadion in 1972

Bayern took part in the Fairs Cups for the second and final time in 1970–71, beating Rangers again before bowing out to Liverpool in the quarter-finals. They won the domestic Cup that year, and advanced to the semi-finals of the subsequent 1971–72 European Cup Winners' Cup, gaining revenge on Liverpool but this time losing out to Rangers, whose turn it was to lift the trophy. However, on the domestic front they secured their second Bundesliga championship, having finished behind Borussia Mönchengladbach for the past two years. That summer would be significant for two reasons: the West Germany team, dominated by Bayern and Mönchengladbach players, won the 1972 UEFA European Championship in Belgium. Having lost to England after extra time in the 1966 FIFA World Cup Final and to Italy in a famous semi-final in the 1970 FIFA World Cup, the dominant Euro victory demonstrated that this group of German players now had the capability to triumph on the biggest stage. Secondly, the 1972 Summer Olympic Games were held in Munich, with Bayern moving into its main arena from the much smaller Grünwalder Stadion after the events were over, giving the club a stadium to match their ambitions of dominance.

In 1972–73, Bayern reached the last eight before losing to holders Ajax, who would go on to retain their title. However, the Bundesliga was successfully defended, and another opportunity in the European Cup beckoned in 1973–74. That campaign was almost a very short one, with a penalty shootout required to overcome Swedish semi-professionals Åtvidaberg in the first round (Bayern were sufficiently impressed with the opposition's Conny Torstensson to sign him a short time later). Subsequent rounds behind the Iron Curtain, including a narrow hard-fought 7–6 victory over East Germans Dynamo Dresden for the 'true German Championship', brought the club to their first Champions Cup final, to be staged at Heysel Stadium in Brussels, the same venue as West Germany's Euro victory. The opposition, Atlético Madrid, were known for their defensive strength, and the 90 minutes ended goalless. When Atlético scored with only five minutes of extra time remaining it seemed like Bayern's dream was over, but a Schwarzenbeck goal with a shot from 30 yards in the last minute meant the tie was saved and a replay was needed. 48 hours later, Bayern produced a superior performance, Hoeneß and Müller each scoring twice, and the 4–0 result brought European football's biggest prize to Bavaria, and indeed to Germany, for the first time.

1974 European Cup final

First match

15 May 1974	Bayern Munich (West Germany)	1–1 (a.e.t.)	(Spain) Atlético Madrid	Heysel Stadium, Brussels
20:00 (CEST)	Schwarzenbeck 120'	Report	Aragonés 114'	Attendance: 48,722; Referee: Vital Loraux (Belgium)

Replay

17 May 1974	Atlético Madrid (Spain)	0–4	(West Germany) Bayern Munich	Heysel Stadium, Brussels
20:00 CEST		Report	Hoeneß 28', 82'; Müller 56', 69'	Attendance: 23,283; Referee: Alfred Delcourt (Belgium)

Two months after the European Cup victory, Bayern's players formed the spine of the West Germany national team which won the 1974 FIFA World Cup on home soil, defeating bitter rivals the Netherlands in the final held in Munich. Beckenbauer, 'Der Kaiser' was the captain and the goals were scored by Breitner and Müller. The outcome represented a shift in power away from the Dutch, whose clubs had participated in the past five European Cup finals but would not be involved again for 14 years.

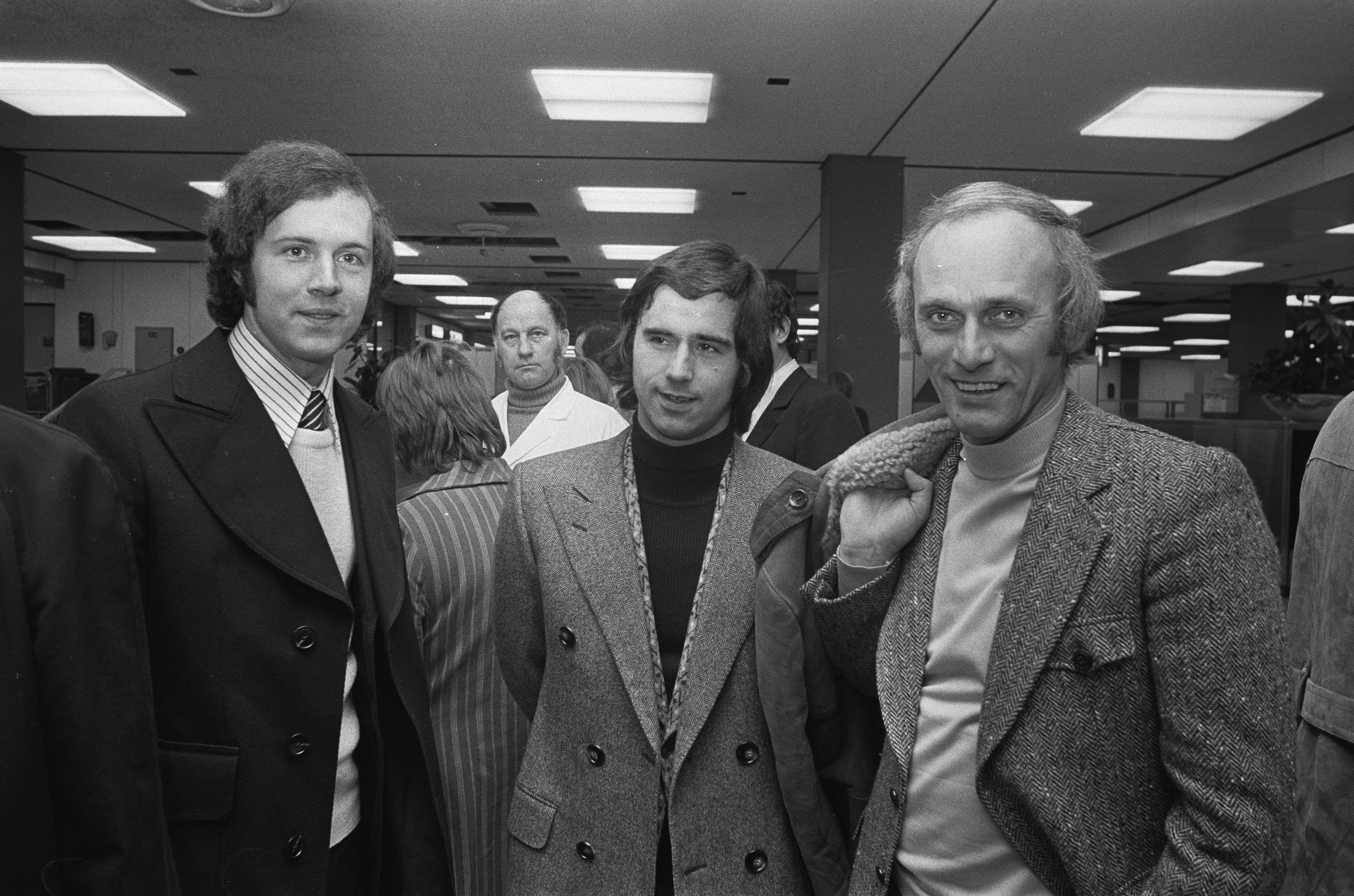
Franz Beckenbauer, Gerd Müller and coach Udo Lattek at Schiphol Airport for a European Cup tie with Ajax, 1973

Bayern and Cup Winners' Cup holders 1. FC Magdeburg of East Germany proved unable to find suitable dates for a European Super Cup meeting. The East's national team had recorded a shock win over the West when they met in the group stage of the World Cup a few months earlier, but when the draw for the second round of the 1974–75 European Cup brought those very teams together by chance, it was again Bayern representing the West who came out on top, although not without problems after falling behind in the first leg.

With Dettmar Cramer newly installed as head coach after parting company with Lattek in January 1975, they progressed past two further opponents including Saint-Etienne to set up a meeting with Leeds United in the Paris final. The result was a 2–0 win for Bayern with goals by Roth and Müller, but the event would be unfavourably remembered for some brutal challenges by the Leeds players and several debatable decisions by the French referee in Bayern's favour including a disallowed goal. This led some English fans to riot in frustration, using broken seats as missiles within the stadium and continuing to damage property in the city through the night.

Domestically, Gladbach won the title and Bayern finished only 10th; they were minus Breitner who had moved to Real Madrid, although their future star Karl-Heinz Rummenigge had joined the club and was an unused substitute in Paris. The following season, the club played in the European Super Cup for the first time, but lost both legs of the tie to Dynamo Kyiv.

1975 European Cup final

28 May 1975	Bayern Munich (West Germany)	2–0	(England) Leeds United	Parc des Princes, Paris
20:15 CEST	Roth 71'; Müller 81'	Report		Attendance: 48,374; Referee: Michel Kitabdjian (France)

1975 European Super Cup

First leg

9 September 1975	Bayern Munich (West Germany)	0–1	(Soviet Union) Dynamo Kyiv	Olympiastadion, Munich
		Report	Blokhin 66'	Attendance: 30,000; Referee: Sergio Gonella (Italy)

Second leg

6 October 1975	Dynamo Kyiv (Soviet Union)	2–0	(West Germany) Bayern Munich	Republican Stadium, Kyiv
	Blokhin 40', 53'	Report		Attendance: 105,000; Referee: Dogan Babacan (Turkey)

Bayern again made little challenge for the domestic title, eventually finishing third as the key players passed their physical peak and lost some of their hunger having won every trophy they could; however, encouraged by the promise of big win bonuses in the competition, Bayern reached the European Cup final once again, defeating Real Madrid in the semis (with Müller and the referee assaulted on the pitch by a spectator at the end of the first leg) to face Saint Etienne in Glasgow. Roth scored the only goal in the second half to bring the trophy home for a third time in succession (following Real Madrid and Ajax in this achievement which allowed them to keep the trophy permanently), while the French team asserted afterwards that it was only the unusual square goalposts at Hampden Park which prevented them from scoring when their attempts struck the crossbar on two occasions. Bayern Munich were represented by four of the West Germany side in the UEFA Euro 1976 Final that summer in Belgrade, but the national squad were also slightly past their absolute best and lost on penalties to Czechoslovakia.

1976 European Cup final

12 May 1976	Bayern Munich (West Germany)	1–0	(France) Saint-Étienne	Hampden Park, Glasgow
20:15 BST	Roth 57'	Report		Attendance: 54,670; Referee: Károly Palotai (Hungary)

Bayern lost their second Super Cup match to Anderlecht that August, but took part in the Intercontinental Cup for the first time, having ceded their 1974 invitation to Atlético Madrid and been unable to find mutually suitable fixture dates with their South American Libertadores Cup-winning counterparts in 1975 (it has also been suggested there was a reluctance to play against Argentinian sides, as would have happened in both those years, due to violence in previous editions). The opposition in November and December 1976 was Brazil's Cruzeiro; Bayern secured a 2–0 first leg lead in a snowy Munich – inevitably Gerd Müller was a scorer, along with Jupp Kapellmann – and held on for a goalless draw across the Atlantic Ocean a month later in front of a crowd of 117,000 at the Mineirão to become the world champions (at the time that title was unofficial, but was retrospectively awarded as such by FIFA in 2017).

1976 European Super Cup

First leg

17 August 1976	Bayern Munich (West Germany)	2–1	(Belgium) Anderlecht	Olympiastadion, Munich
	Müller 58', 88'	Report	Haan 16'	Attendance: 41,000; Referee: Ken Burns (England)

Second leg

30 August 1976	Anderlecht (Belgium)	4–1	(West Germany) Bayern Munich	Parc Astrid, Brussels
	Rensenbrink 20', 82'; Van der Elst 25'; Haan 59'	Report	Müller 63'	Attendance: 35,000; Referee: Paul Schiller (Austria)

1976 Intercontinental Cup

First leg

23 November 1976	Bayern Munich (West Germany)	2–0	(Brazil) Cruzeiro	Olympiastadion, Munich
	Müller 80'; Kapellmann 82'	Report		Attendance: 22,000; Referee: Luis Pestarino (Argentina)

Second leg

21 December 1976	Cruzeiro (Brazil)	0–0	(West Germany) Bayern Munich	Mineirão, Belo Horizonte
		Report		Attendance: 123,715; Referee: Pat Partridge (England)

A West German club reached the 1977 European Cup Final, but it was Lattek's Gladbach who did so; their loss to Liverpool signalled the start of a period of dominance in that competition by English teams. Bayern had finally relinquished their grip on the trophy at the quarter-final stage, losing to Dynamo Kyiv. Gerd Müller was the competition's top scorer for the fourth time. Domestically they dropped down to 7th, scraping into the UEFA Cup for the first time, but then were eliminated by fellow Bundesliga club Eintracht Frankfurt in the early rounds of that tournament; between the two legs of the tie (already all but lost with a heavy 4–0 deficit) Bayern engaged in an unusual 'trainer exchange' with the opposition, with Dettmar Cramer going west to Frankfurt am Main and Gyula Lóránt east to Munich, but despite this change, they finished the 1977–78 season at home in a historic low placing of 12th, meaning there would be no European football at all in the next campaign. It was the end of that era, but it would not be the club's last spell of success by any means.

Aided by the return of Paul Breitner, it took Bayern and coach Pál Csernai little more than a year to re-establish themselves as a force, finishing 4th in the 1978–79 Bundesliga to qualify for the 1979–80 UEFA Cup, where they reached the semi-finals, beating 1. FC Kaiserslautern then losing to the eventual winners Frankfurt – all the semi-finalists were from West Germany, a unique situation which in combination with the presence of Hamburger SV in the European Cup final demonstrated the quality of their league at that time. Bayern regained the Bundesliga championship, but Rummenigge was their sole representative on the field as the West Germany team won UEFA Euro 1980, such was the strength across several of their clubs. This period also saw what would prove to be an important off-field appointment as Uli Hoeneß, forced to retire early from playing due to injury, was installed as general manager.

=== 1980s ===
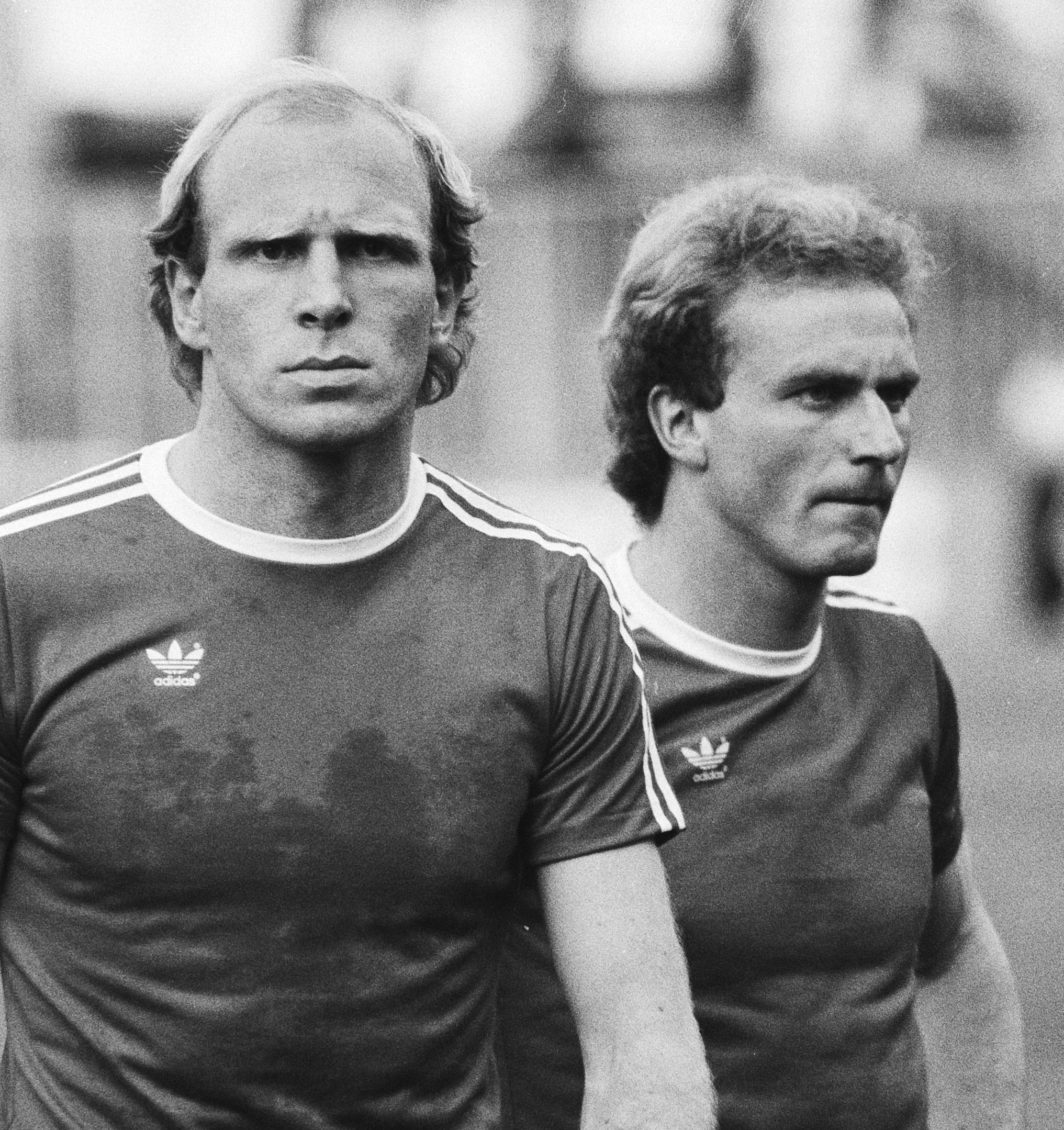
Obvious disappointment on the faces of Dieter Hoeneß (left) and Karl-Heinz Rummenigge as the 1982 European Cup Final slips away from them.

Another semi-final was reached in 1981, this time back in the Champions Cup, and again the club who knocked them out – Liverpool, on away goals – won the trophy.

Bayern held off Hamburg for another domestic title and access to the 1981–82 European Cup, and went all the way to the final in Rotterdam. In a surprise outcome, the final was lost to English opposition, but rather than holders Liverpool (eliminated by CSKA Sofia who had then lost to Bayern) the victors were surprise package Aston Villa, who had never been in contention for a continental final previously and would never be again in the decades to follow, had changed manager a few months before the final and finished 11th in their domestic league, the lowest ever position by a European champion (surpassing Bayern's own 10th place in 1975). Bayern were unable to get past Villa's defence despite the Birmingham side having to substitute experienced goalkeeper Jimmy Rimmer with rookie Nigel Spink in the opening minutes. Along with Rummenigge, Bernd Dürnberger and Udo Horsmann were survivors from the 1976 final.

1982 European Cup final

26 May 1982	Aston Villa (England)	1–0	(West Germany) Bayern Munich	Feijenoord Stadion, Rotterdam
20:15 CEST	Withe 67'	Report		Attendance: 46,000; Referee: Georges Konrath (France)

That summer, West Germany reached another World Cup final with three Bayern players – Breitner, Rummenigge and Wolfgang Dremmler – on the pitch in Madrid but again they were left disappointed as Italy won 3–1. Hamburg took back the domestic title, although Bayern did win the German Cup and were among the favourites for the 1982–83 European Cup Winners' Cup; however after getting the better of England's Tottenham Hotspur they were eliminated in the quarter-finals by Aberdeen after the small Scottish club managed by Alex Ferguson scored two goals in quick succession to turn the tie on its head on their way to lifting the trophy. They also lost to the eventual English winners of the 1983–84 UEFA Cup (Tottenham) and the 1984–85 Cup Winners' Cup (Everton, in a dramatic semi-final).

The club had returned to winning ways at home, and had won two successive championships and on their way to a third when they progressed through the rounds of the 1986–87 European Cup, disposing of four strong rivals: PSV, Austria Wien, Anderlecht and Real Madrid (the first leg of which featured an assault on Lothar Matthäus by Juanito, and the second a hail of missiles onto the pitch from the Spanish supporters with the tie lost) – to meet FC Porto in the final. By this time English clubs had been banned from competing after the events of Heysel in 1985, removing one opponent of likely high strength from the draw. The Portuguese club had little European pedigree aside from being runners-up in the Cup Winners' Cup three years earlier, and as in 1982, Bayern were installed as favourites. Although they had lost Karl-Heinz Rummenigge to the Italian team Inter Milan in a record deal which was essential to restore the club's financial security, the side now included his brother Michael, and also contained four members of the West Germany team – Norbert Eder, Lothar Matthäus, Dieter Hoeneß (younger sibling of Uli) and Andy Brehme – which had lost another World Cup final in Mexico the previous summer (where the club's Belgian goalkeeper Jean-Marie Pfaff was nominated the best in the tournament) and so were desperate to avoid more heartache, as well as more experienced in big events than the Portuguese team. Another Germany regular and Bayern youth product Klaus Augenthaler had already been left disappointed when he was suspended for the encounter. They were also coached again by Udo Lattek, who had an important role in their 1970s success, and had by far the majority of the support in Vienna, only 400 kilometres (250 mi) from Munich. Despite these seemingly favourable circumstances, and taking the lead on the night through youngster Ludwig Kögl, Bayern were unable to hold their advantage and Porto scored two skillful goals in three minutes late in the game to transform the outcome and take the prize, breaking a pattern of no team having to score more than once in the past decade of finals to win. The defeat of the Bayern team that was assembled relatively inexpensively from within Germany was said to have caused Uli Hoeneß to switch focus onto attracting international stars in an attempt to revive the club's fortunes.

1987 European Cup final

27 May 1987	Bayern Munich (West Germany)	1–2	(Portugal) Porto	Praterstadion, Vienna
20:15 CEST	Kögl 25'	Report	Madjer 77'; Juary 80'	Attendance: 57,500; Referee: Alexis Ponnet (Belgium)

Brehme and Matthäus soon also departed for Italy (specifically Inter), and after suffering a defeat to the Netherlands on home soil in the UEFA Euro 1988 tournament, they were in the national side which won the World Cup in that nation in 1990. Led by Franz Beckenbauer as coach, serving Bayern players Stefan Reuter, Jürgen Kohler, Raimond Aumann, Hans Pflügler, Olaf Thon and Augenthaler were also in that World Cup winning squad, although the moves of defenders Reuter and Kohler to Italy in 1991 (along with several more German players) meant that Bayern had to reinforce their back line again.

Under Jupp Heynckes as coach, the team reached the semi-finals of the UEFA Cup in 1989 and the European Cup in 1990 and 1991, with their conquerors Napoli, Milan and Red Star Belgrade winning the title on each occasion - extra time had been needed for Milan to beat Bayern on away goals, while Red Star progressed due to an unfortunate own goal by Augenthaler in the last minute. Outside official UEFA competitions, German reunification took place in this period, and in November 1990 Bayern played in the commemorative single-game Deutschland-Cup as reigning champions of the West, losing 1–0 to the 1990 East German title holders Dynamo Dresden at their home ground.

=== 1990s ===
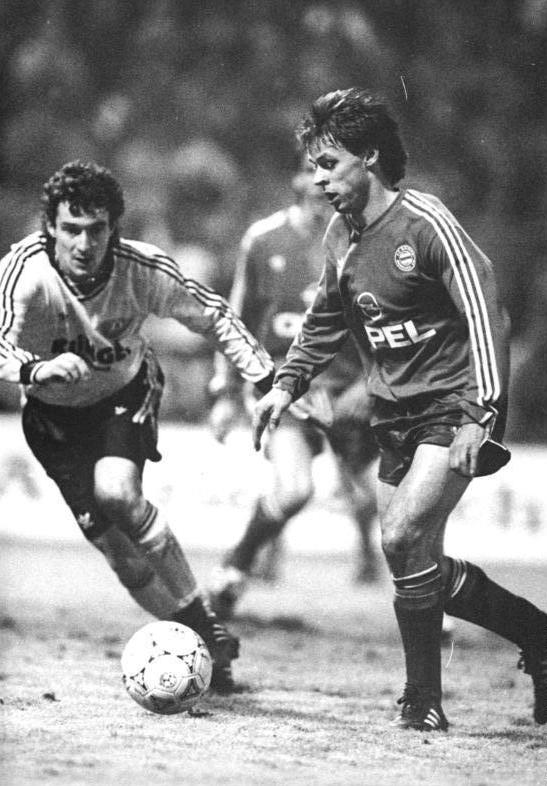
Olaf Thon of Bayern takes on Dynamo Dresden in the unofficial 'Deutschland Cup', 1990

Only one Bundesliga title was collected in a transitional period between 1990 and 1996. After a record-equalling margin of loss (6–2) in the first leg of their defeat at the hands of Denmark's B 1903 in the 1991–92 UEFA Cup's early rounds, the club did not qualify for Europe at all the following year, and in 1993 suffered elimination from the same competition by Norwich City, who became the first English team to win at the Olympiastadion. Matthäus returned to Bavaria in 1992 and the club also picked up some of the most promising talents from around Germany, including goalkeeper Oliver Kahn, defenders Christian Ziege, Markus Babbel, Thomas Helmer and midfielder Mehmet Scholl, plus Brazilian Jorginho who would win the World Cup while at the club in 1994. Franz Beckenbauer and Karl-Heinz Rummenigge were also invited to rejoin the club in an executive capacity. Bayern's first experience of the new-style UEFA Champions League in the 1994–95 season was ended in the semi-finals by eventual winners Ajax, coached by Louis van Gaal, who did not lose a match in any competition that year.

In that year's domestic campaign, Bayern finished 6th and only qualified for the 1995–96 UEFA Cup due to Mönchengladbach, who were one place higher, also winning the Pokal and entering the Cup Winners' Cup. That good fortune was capitalised upon, as new signing Jürgen Klinsmann became the competition's leading striker with a record haul of 15 goals helping the club past rivals including FC Barcelona. Despite this, poor domestic results led to coach Otto Rehhagel losing his position before the two-legged final against Girondins Bordeaux; Beckenbauer, who had taken on the role of club president after winning the title as coach in 1993–94, stepped back onto the bench temporarily. Wins in both legs, each featuring a strike from Scholl, sealed a 5–1 aggregate victory over the French team who had only entered the UEFA Cup via the UEFA Intertoto Cup, the pre-season qualifying competition. As well as the first continental title in 20 years, claiming the UEFA Cup after the Cup Winners' Cup and the Champions Cup meant that Bayern became only the third club to win each of those three main UEFA competitions, after Juventus and Ajax. That summer, Germany became European champions again, with several of Bayern's contingent (other than Matthäus who was not selected and Kahn who stayed on the bench throughout) playing prominent roles in the triumph in England. A year after their UEFA Cup final, Former Bordeaux full-back Bixente Lizarazu moved to Bayern after a short spell at Athletic Bilbao.

1996 UEFA Cup final

First leg

1 May 1996	Bayern Munich (Germany)	2–0	(France) Bordeaux	Olympiastadion, Munich
20:00 CEST	Helmer 34'; Scholl 60'	Report		Attendance: 63,000; Referee: Serge Muhmenthaler (Switzerland)

Second leg

15 May 1996	Bordeaux (France)	1–3	(Germany) Bayern Munich	Parc Lescure, Bordeaux
20:45 CEST	Dutuel 76'	Report	Scholl 53'; Kostadinov 65'; Klinsmann 78'	Attendance: 36,000; Referee: Vadim Zhuk (Belarus)

Nevertheless, winning a fourth European Cup remained an ongoing priority. The elite competition was revamped to include runners-up in addition to league champions, later being expanded further, which meant prominent clubs like Bayern would rarely fail to qualify, but would now have to face multiple contenders from the other top leagues to reach the latter stages whereas in the past a favourable draw and results elsewhere could make progression more straightforward. The final year of solely champions being invited, 1996–97, concluded with the final at Munich's Olympiastadion. Bayern could only look on with envy as German rivals Borussia Dortmund lifted the coveted Henkelpott in their first appearance in the final with a victory over Juventus, with the Dortmund team including the ex-Bayern pair Kohler and Reuter (they and three other teammates had also formerly played for Juventus). Bayern had the consolation of winning the Bundesliga under Giovanni Trapattoni, but they were eliminated from the next edition of the Champions League by Dortmund and lost the league crown to newly-promoted Kaiserslautern, coached by Rehhagel.

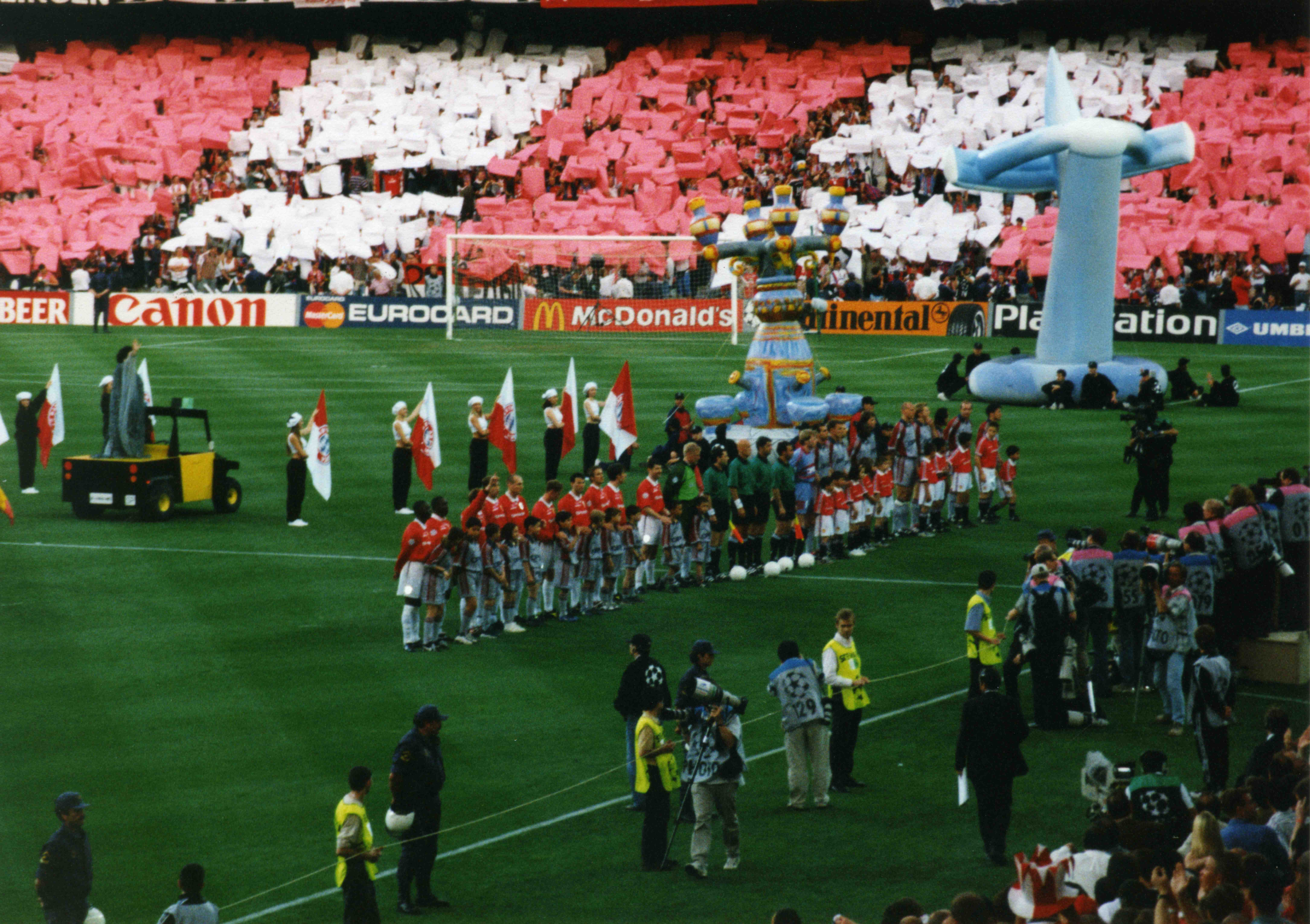
Teams line up prior to the 1999 UEFA Champions League Final (Bayern Munich in grey)

If those were disappointing outcomes, worse was to follow. In the 1998–99 UEFA Champions League, Bayern topped a tough group containing Alex Ferguson's Manchester United and a Barcelona team coached by van Gaal, eliminating the latter, then easily defeated Kaiserslautern and narrowly overcame Dynamo Kyiv to set up a rematch with Manchester United in the final at Camp Nou, the first time the occasion would feature two clubs who had not won their domestic league or the Champions Cup the previous season. Leading through an early free-kick from Mario Basler, Bayern (without Lizarazu and leading forward Giovane Élber through injury) squandered chances to extend their lead but seemed to have done enough for a 1–0 win going into stoppage time. However, the English side, also missing important midfielders through suspension, found an equaliser from a corner kick in the 91st minute, quickly forced another corner and scored again. Bayern had no time or energy to respond, and the cup was on its way to Old Trafford. The dramatic circumstances of the defeat left several players distraught, while the club and supporters had to come to terms with a third narrow loss in a European Cup final. A few weeks later they lost the 1999 DFB-Pokal Final to Werder Bremen on penalties, although the Bundesliga title had been reclaimed by a huge margin weeks before the Barcelona showpiece.

1999 UEFA Champions League final

26 May 1999	Manchester United (England)	2–1	(Germany) Bayern Munich	Camp Nou, Barcelona
20:45 CEST	Sheringham 90+1'; Solskjær 90+3'	Report	Basler 6'	Attendance: 90,245; Referee: Pierluigi Collina (Italy)

=== 2000s ===
Bayern bounced back immediately in the 1999–2000 season, winning a league and cup double and only losing in the semi-finals of the Champions League to eventual winners Real Madrid, whom they had already defeated heavily twice in the group stage. When the same teams met again at the same point in the 2000–01 edition, Bayern secured a 1–0 victory at the Bernabéu through Élber, who also scored in the return leg (as he had in a 'revenge' win over Manchester United in the quarter-final) to secure another final berth.

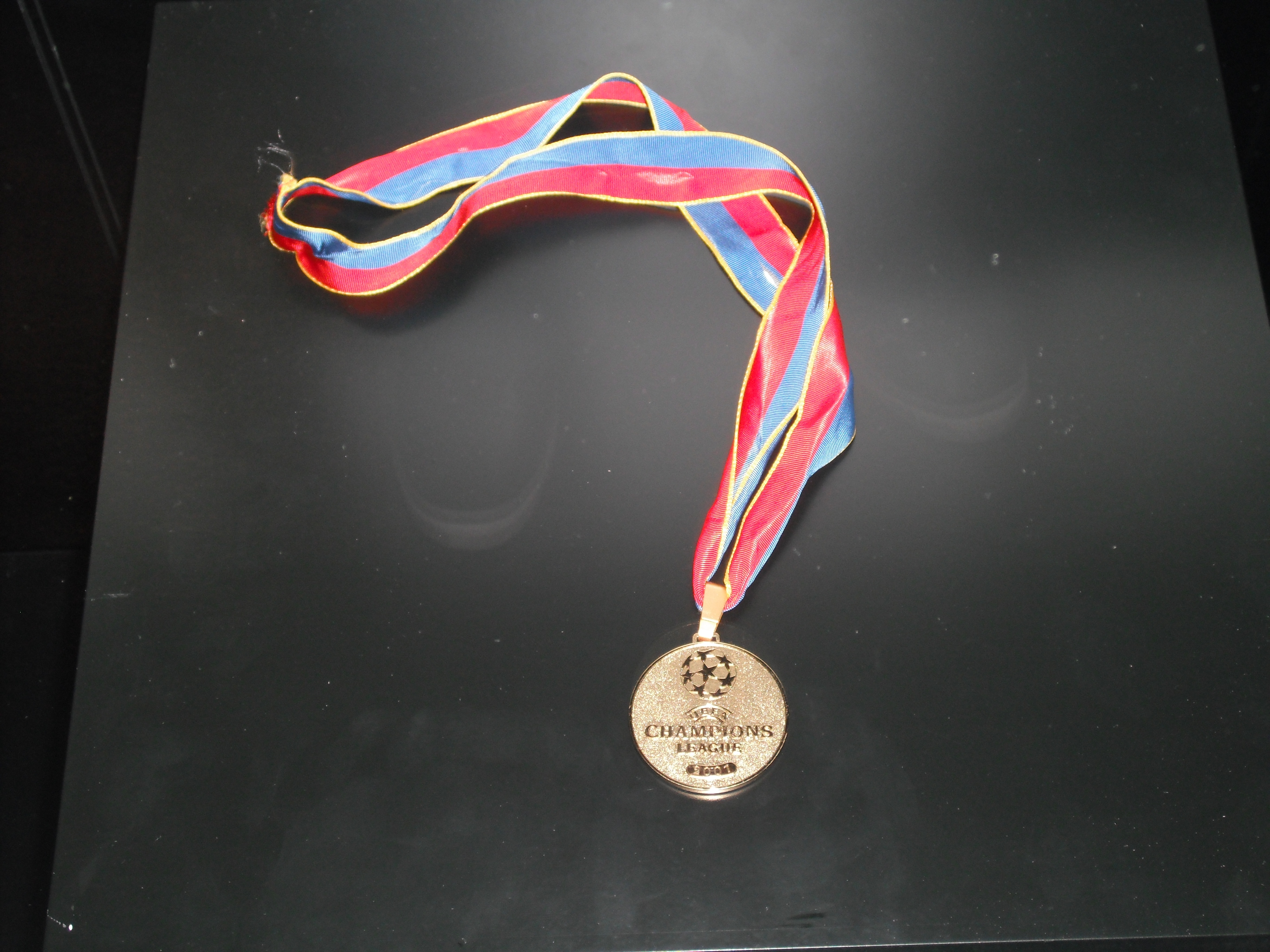
Mehmet Scholl's 2001 Champions League winner's medal, on display at the club museum.

While Bayern, had just sealed a third league title in a row, appeared cursed not to win the European Cup again – in contrast to the Bayern-luck which was perceived to benefit them in domestic competitions such as their two most recent league titles, won on the final day by the narrowest of margins – their opponents at the San Siro showdown would be Valencia, the team beaten by Madrid in the 2000 final, therefore it was something of a 'battle of the losers' (the first time the previous two beaten finalists had met) with one club to be redeemed and another to suffer a second misfortune in quick succession. The match was a tense affair, ending 1–1 after extra time with both goals from penalty kicks (Bayern's from Stefan Effenberg in the second half after Scholl failed to score from one in the first period), leading to a shootout in which Kahn saved three of Valencia's seven attempts for a 5–4 victory, the end of a 25-year wait to lift the 'big ears cup' for a fourth time, and a sense of both triumph and relief for the players and head coach Ottmar Hitzfeld who had been involved two years earlier (by contrast, for Hitzfeld's counterpart Héctor Cúper it was his third defeat in major European finals in as many years).

2001 UEFA Champions League final

23 May 2001	Bayern Munich (Germany)	1–1 (a.e.t.) (5–4 p)	(Spain) Valencia	San Siro, Milan
20:45 CEST	Effenberg 50' (pen.)	Report	Mendieta 3' (pen.)	Attendance: 79,000; Referee: Dick Jol (Netherlands)
	Penalties
	Paulo Sérgio (penalty missed); Salihamidžic (penalty scored); Zickler (penalty scored); Andersson (penalty missed); Effenberg (penalty scored); Lizarazu (penalty scored); Linke (penalty scored)		(penalty scored) Mendieta; (penalty scored) Carew; (penalty missed) Zahovic; (penalty missed) Carboni; (penalty scored) Baraja; (penalty scored) Kily González; (penalty missed) Pellegrino

Bayern lost the 2001 UEFA Super Cup to Liverpool (whose team contained their former players Markus Babbel and Dietmar Hamann) but won the 2001 Intercontinental Cup over Boca Juniors in Tokyo through a goal from Samuel Kuffour in extra time to be named world champions for a second time. French international Lizarazu became the first player to be simultaneously a European and World champion at club and international level (the feat would later be emulated in 2011 by the Spanish players of Barcelona; Bayern's previous Champions Cup stalwarts were no longer reigning European international title holders by the time they won the Intercontinental Cup in late 1976). Bayern relinquished the Bundesliga title to Dortmund, and in the Champions League it was Real Madrid who prevailed in their latest battle, in the quarter-finals – the Spaniards again went on to claim the trophy, overcoming Germans Bayer Leverkusen (who had finished above Bayern Munich in the domestic league) in the final. These Bayern-Madrid matches strengthened a continental rivalry between the two famous clubs as the meetings between them became more frequent; however, they have never met in a final.

2001 UEFA Super Cup

24 August 2001	Bayern Munich (Germany)	2–3	(England) Liverpool	Stade Louis II, Monaco
20:45 CEST	Salihamidžic 57'; Jancker 82'	Report	Riise 23'; Heskey 45'; Owen 46'	Attendance: 13,824; Referee: Vítor Melo Pereira (Portugal)

2001 Intercontinental Cup

27 November 2001	Bayern Munich (Germany)	1–0 (a.e.t.)	(Argentina) Boca Juniors	National Stadium, Tokyo
19:20 JST	Kuffour 109'	Report		Attendance: 51,360; Referee: Kim Milton Nielsen (Denmark)

Despite the national team going through a poor spell by their standards, due in part to the leading clubs such as Bayern choosing to bring in established foreign imports rather than developing young local players from their Junior team, Germany unexpectedly reached the 2002 FIFA World Cup Final – Bayern's representatives were defender Thomas Linke, midfielder Jens Jeremies, forward Carsten Jancker and goalkeeper Kahn, who won the Golden Ball as the tournament's best player, the first in his position to win it and also the first from the club, eclipsing the heroes of the past generation in that respect. Germany's other star in 2002 was Michael Ballack who transferred to Bayern from Leverkusen immediately after the tournament. Despite a good scoring rate for Bayern, Élber was not selected for the Brazil squad which won the competition.

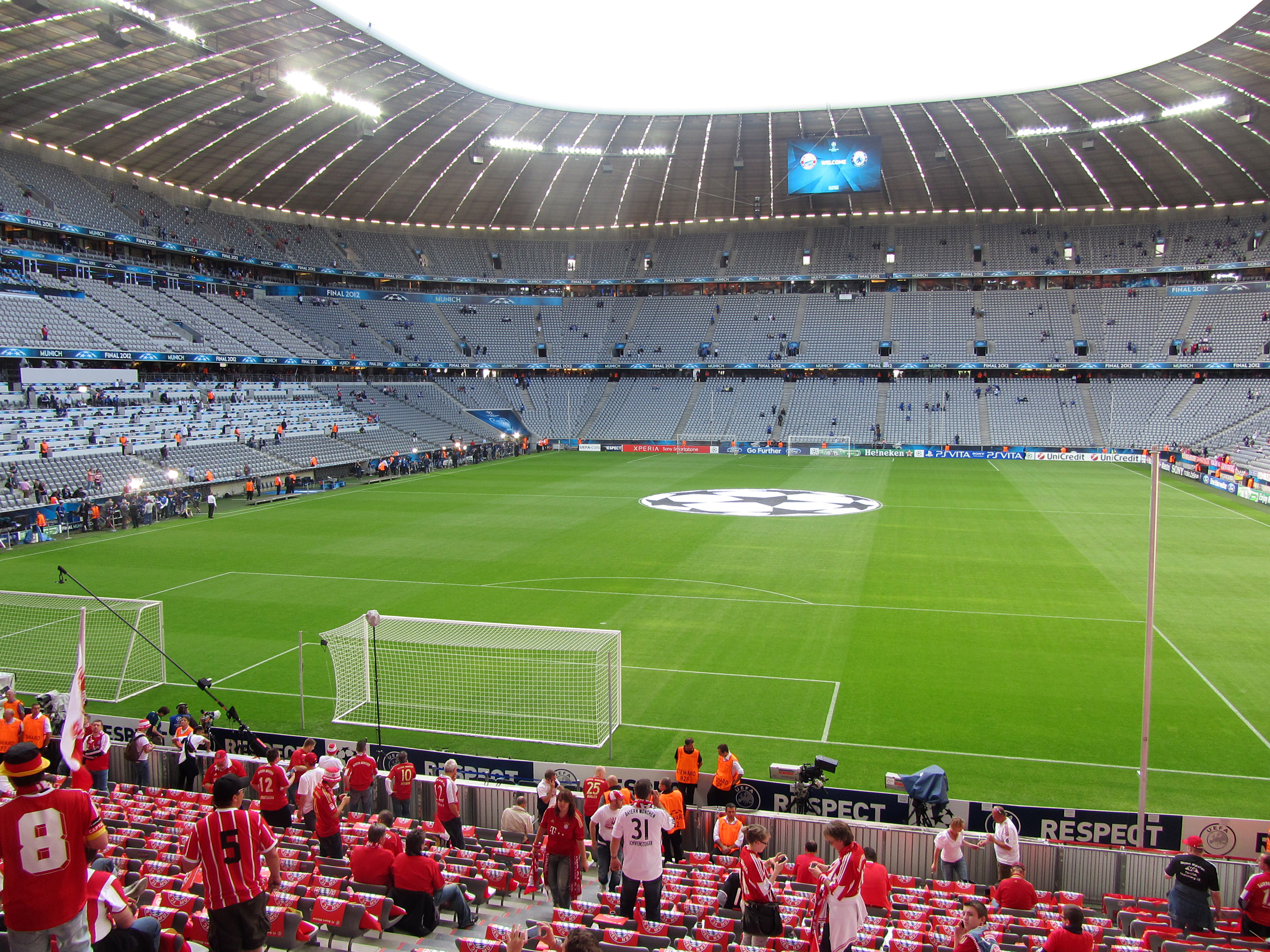
The club moved to the Allianz Arena in 2005

Bayern won three German doubles in the next four seasons, but failed to reach the last four in the Champions League. In 2005 the club moved from the Olympiastadion to the new Allianz Arena, built for the 2006 FIFA World Cup to be held in Germany, giving a significant increase in capacity for home matches as well as moving the spectators closer to the playing field for improved atmosphere. At the World Cup, a Germany squad including young Bavarians Bastian Schweinsteiger and Phillipp Lahm, as well as Lukas Podolski who joined Bayern from 1. FC Köln later that summer, lost to winners Italy in the semi-finals but defeated Portugal to claim the bronze medal. The 2006–07 season was a disappointment as Bayern again failed to make much impact in Europe (losing to Italian opposition in Milan) and finished fourth at home, out of the Champions League places. Installed as favourites for the 2007–08 UEFA Cup, they overcame Aberdeen after waiting 25 years to meet the Scots again, but lost to Zenit Saint Petersburg in the semi-finals; the Russians defeated another Scottish team, Rangers, in the final. Bayern returned to winning ways domestically with another double, but surrendered both trophies in 2008–09 and once more went no further than the last eight in the Champions League.

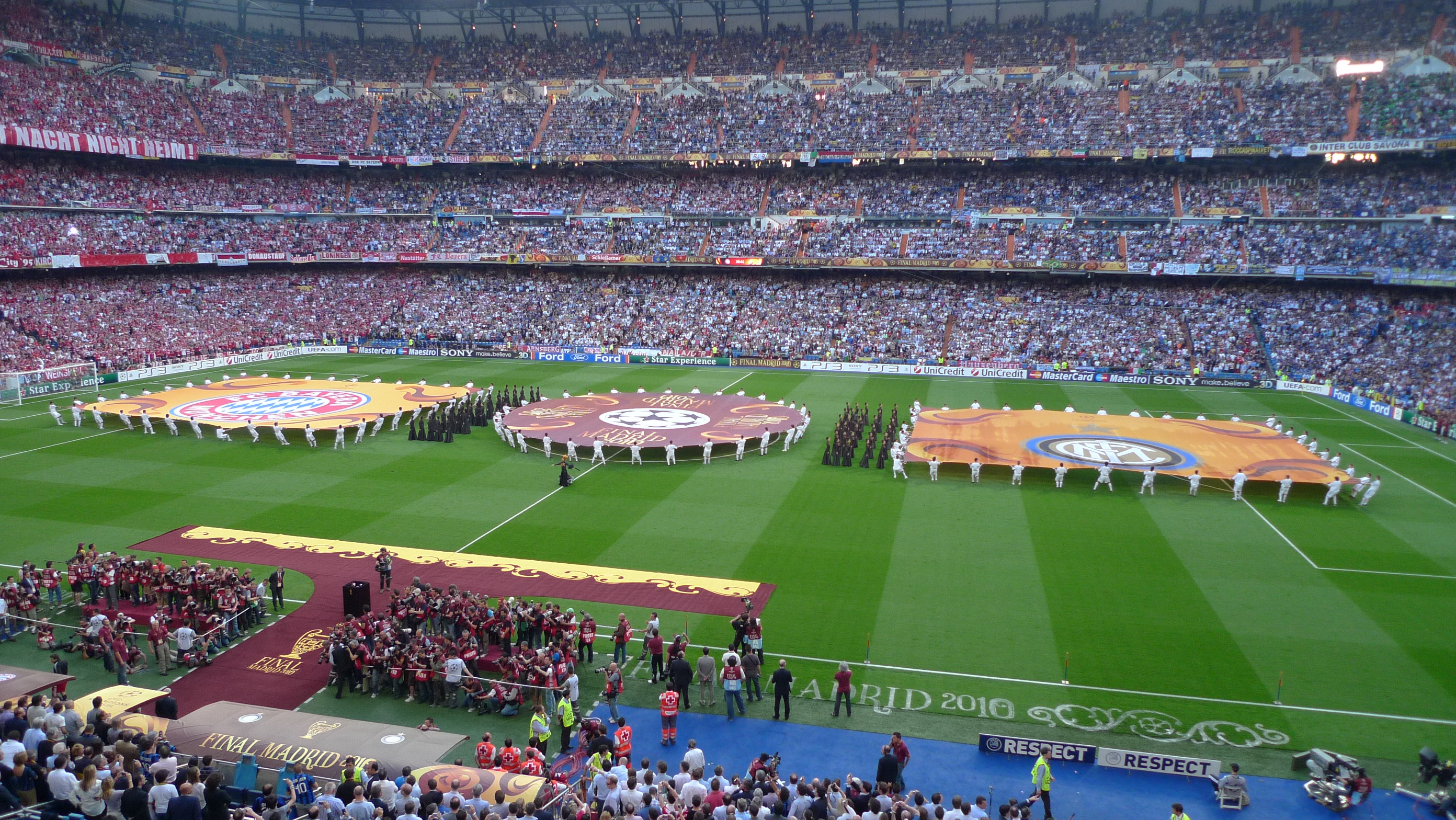
Pre-match ceremony of the 2010 UEFA Champions League Final between Bayern and Inter Milan

Louis van Gaal became Bayern head coach in summer 2009, spending large sums on forwards Mario Gómez and Arjen Robben, adjusting Schweinsteiger's role and installing youngsters Holger Badstuber and Thomas Müller into the line-up, while allowing players like Podolski and Lúcio to depart. The changes brought not only another domestic double but improvement in the Champions League – another final was reached with the possibility of a historic treble, but the tactics of Jose Mourinho's Inter Milan (featuring Lúcio in defence) proved superior with a 2–0 win in Madrid, and it was the Italian club which claimed a treble of their own.

2010 UEFA Champions League final

22 May 2010	Bayern Munich (Germany)	0–2	(Italy) Internazionale	Santiago Bernabéu, Madrid
20:45 CEST		Report	Milito 35', 70'	Attendance: 73,490; Referee: Howard Webb (England)

At the 2010 FIFA World Cup, the numerous Bayern players in the Germany squad would be left disappointed again as they finished 3rd, losing 1–0 in the semi-final to Spain, who had also defeated Germany by the same scoreline in the UEFA Euro 2008 Final. The club's Dutch players Robben and Mark van Bommel were on the losing side in both finals. Thomas Müller was the winner of the Golden Boot with five goals and was the 'best young player', while Schweinsteiger and Lahm were named in the tournament's Dream Team.

=== 2010s ===
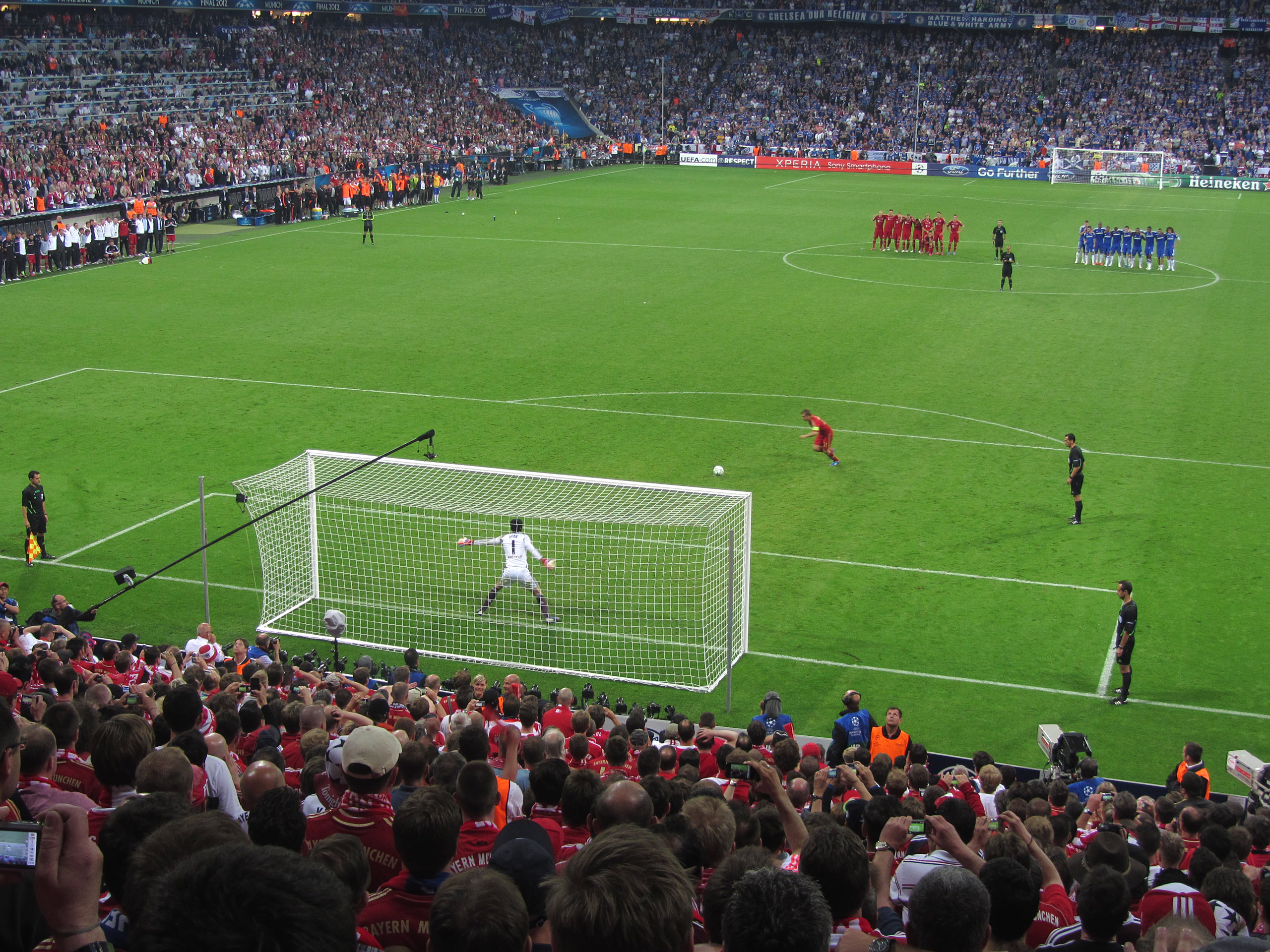
Bayern's Phillip Lahm runs up to take his penalty during the shootout in the 2012 UEFA Champions League Final

In 2010–11, Bayern dropped to third in the Bundesliga and made an early exit from the Champions League, with holders Inter again ending their hopes. Van Gaal departed and was replaced by Jupp Heynckes for another spell in charge.

In 2011–12, after eliminating Real Madrid on penalties in the Champions League semi-final, they lost both the title race and the cup final to Borussia Dortmund by the time of the continental final against Chelsea – to be held at the Allianz Arena. Home advantage appeared to have made the difference when Thomas Müller scored the opening goal with only seven minutes left to play, but Didier Drogba equalised for Chelsea five minutes later. No further goals were scored during extra time, with Arjen Robben having a penalty saved for the home side in the first period, so penalties were needed: after three kicks had been saved, Drogba took his opportunity to win the cup for Chelsea. It was another bitter blow in Bayern Munich's long history of contrasting fortunes.

2012 UEFA Champions League final

19 May 2012	Bayern Munich (Germany)	1–1 (a.e.t.) (3–4 p)	(England) Chelsea	Allianz Arena, Munich
20:45 CEST	Müller 83'	Report	Drogba 88'	Attendance: 62,500; Referee: Pedro Proença (Portugal)
	Penalties
	Lahm (penalty scored); Gómez (penalty scored); Neuer (penalty scored); Olic (penalty missed); Schweinsteiger (penalty missed)		(penalty missed) Mata; (penalty scored) David Luiz; (penalty scored) Lampard; (penalty scored) Cole; (penalty scored) Drogba

As on previous occasions, Bayern returned stronger from a setback. After gaining a small revenge over Dortmund to win the 2012 DFL-Supercup, they reclaimed the Bundesliga title in style, losing only once and breaking multiple records during the campaign. In Europe, they eliminated Arsenal, Juventus and Barcelona by increasing margins (a 7–0 aggregate over the Catalans) to reach a tenth Champions League final, to be staged at Wembley Stadium in London.

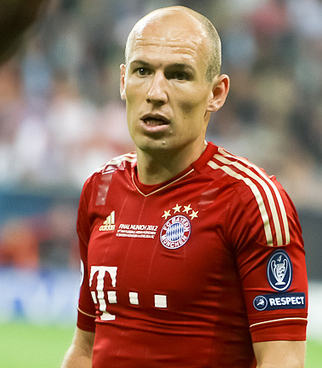
Arjen Robben featured in three Champions League finals for the club, missing a penalty in 2012 then scoring the winning goal in 2013

Their opponents would be familiar: Borussia Dortmund, in the first all-German final in the competition's history (there had previously been one all-Spanish, one all-Italian and one all-English final since the competition invited multiple entrants in the late 1990s). Most of Bayern's squad for the final remained the same as the previous year, and they were slight favourites due to their dominant domestic form. Mario Mandžukić scored the opening goal in the second half, swiftly equalised by Dortmund through a penalty. The contest seemed to be moving towards extra time when Franck Ribéry set up Arjen Robben in the 89th minute, and the Dutchman found the net. Dortmund had little time to respond, and the match ended 2–1 to give Bayern the prize for a fifth time. The following week, Bayern defeated Stuttgart in the 2013 DFB-Pokal final to complete the treble (or a quadruple including the DFL-Supercup), an unprecedented feat in German football and only achieved seven times previously in other leagues across Europe.

2013 UEFA Champions League final

25 May 2013	Borussia Dortmund (Germany)	1–2	(Germany) Bayern Munich	Wembley Stadium, London
19:45 BST	Gündoğan 68' (pen.)	Report	Mandžukić 60'; Robben 89'	Attendance: 86,298; Referee: Nicola Rizzoli (Italy)

Three months later, the 2013 UEFA Super Cup saw a rematch between Bayern, now coached by Pep Guardiola, and Chelsea (who had dropped out of their Champions League defence at the group stage but gone on to win the 'Europa League', as the UEFA Cup had now been rebranded). After a 1–1 draw on 90 minutes they shared two more goals in extra time, Bayern equalising in the last minute. Penalties were required again, and this time Chelsea missed their last while Bayern scored all five, to add the Super Cup to the club's trophy cabinet for the first time. However, they had already missed the chance to make a clean sweep in the 2013 calendar year when Dortmund won the 2013 DFL-Supercup. As European champions, Bayern moved straight to the semi-final stage of the FIFA Club World Cup which in 2013 was held in Morocco. They defeated Asian representatives Guangzhou Evergrande 3–0 to progress to the final, and saw off the host nation's Raja Casablanca (who had unexpectedly eliminated the South American champions Atlético Mineiro) in the final to be crowned world champions for a third time. As in the European Cup and the Intercontinental Cup, they were the first German club to lift the World Club Cup.

2013 UEFA Super Cup

30 August 2013	Bayern Munich (Germany)	2–2 (a.e.t.) (5–4 p)	(England) Chelsea	Eden Arena, Prague
20:45 CEST	Ribéry 47'; Martínez 120+1'	Report	Torres 8'; Hazard 93'	Attendance: 17,686; Referee: Jonas Eriksson (Sweden)
	Penalties
	Alaba (penalty scored); Kroos (penalty scored); Lahm (penalty scored); Ribéry (penalty scored); Shaqiri (penalty scored)		(penalty scored) David Luiz; (penalty scored) Oscar; (penalty scored) Lampard; (penalty scored) Cole; (penalty missed) Lukaku

2013 FIFA Club World Cup final

21 December 2013	Bayern Munich (Germany)	2–0	(Morocco) Raja Casablanca	Stade de Marrakech, Marrakesh
19:30 UTC±0	Dante 7'; Thiago 22'	Report		Attendance: 37,774; Referee: Sandro Ricci (Brazil)

Bayern retained both the Bundesliga and the German Cup in 2014 in dominant fashion, but lost their grip on the Champions League after a heavy defeat to Real Madrid, who again went on to win it (exactly as had transpired in 2002). That summer, Germany won the 2014 FIFA World Cup: serving Bayern players Manuel Neuer, Philipp Lahm, Jérôme Boateng, Toni Kroos, Thomas Müller and Bastian Schweinsteiger played the entirety of the final against Argentina, substitute Mario Götze scored the winning goal, and the club's former players Mats Hummels and Miroslav Klose were also involved. Neuer was named as best goalkeeper, and was in the Dream Team along with Kroos and Müller.

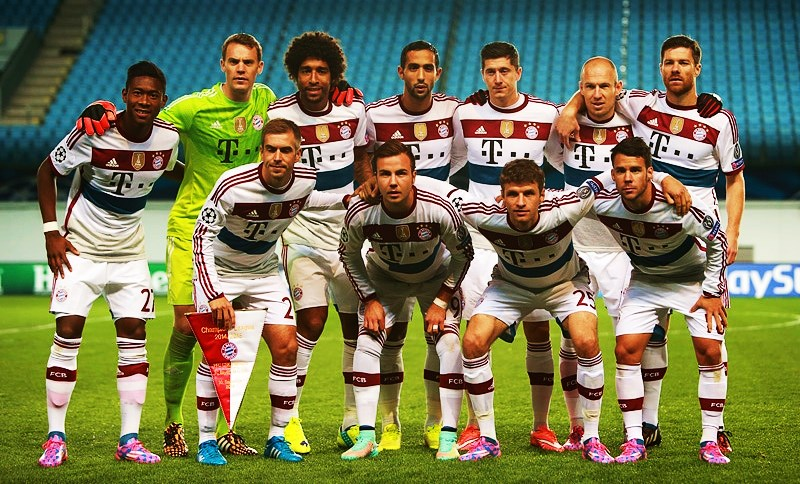
Bayern line up for a Champions League match in Russia, 2014 (at that point still displaying the gold shield of reigning World Champions on their jerseys)

In the wake of Germany's World Cup victory, the next four campaigns all followed similar patterns to 2013–14 for Bayern Munich: with their attack led by Robert Lewandowski, triumph in the domestic League by a large margin (an ongoing record sequence of six titles in a row was claimed), but defeated by Spanish opposition in the later stages of the Champions League (falling to winners Barcelona in 2015, to runners-up Atlético Madrid in 2016 – in the clubs' first meeting since the 1974 final – and to winners Real Madrid in both 2017 and 2018). Thomas Müller's Champions League goal tally stood at 42 by the end of 2017–18, a club record in that competition ahead of Lewandowski but some way behind namesake Gerd's overall total of 67 in all competitions.

Bayern had another player to add to their list of World Cup winning players in 2018 when Corentin Tolisso, the club's record signing at €41.5 million, was in the France squad which won the tournament in Russia, with Germany having failed to qualify from the group stage. That international failure was mirrored in the Champions League, with Bayern's 2018–19 involvement ending with a home defeat at the hands of Liverpool in the Round of 16, the earliest exit since 2010–11; Dortmund and Schalke also suffered heavy losses to English opposition at the same stage.

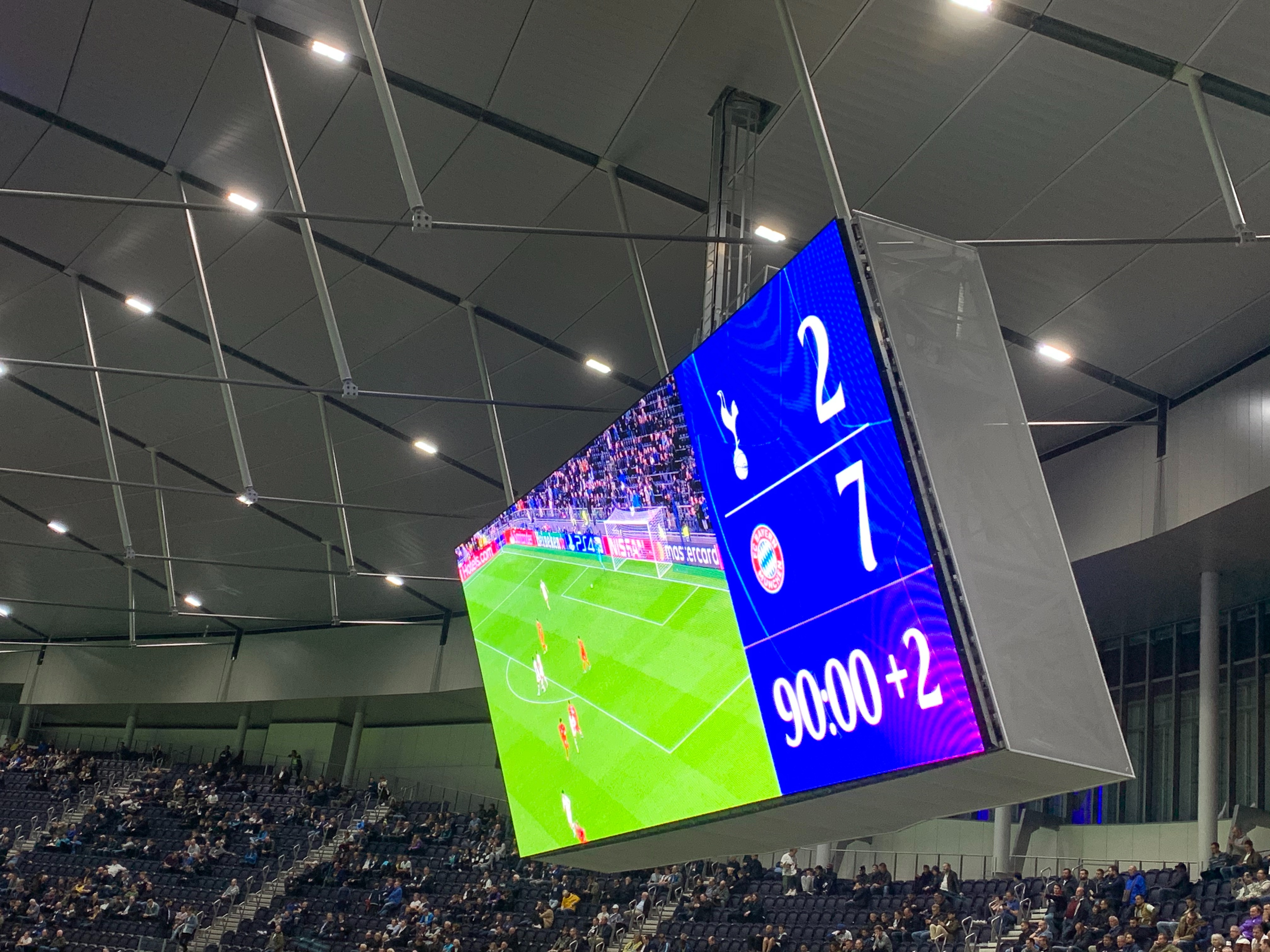
Scoreboard from the Tottenham Hotspur Stadium where Bayern defeated the home side 7–2 in October 2019, one of several dominant performances en route to winning the 2020 UEFA Champions League final, with a 100% record of victories from 11 fixtures

Bayern were notably strong in the 2019–20 Champions League autumn fixtures, finishing the group stage with a 100% record for the first time. Their goal difference from the six matches was 24–5, including a 7–2 away victory over Tottenham Hotspur with Serge Gnabry scoring four, and a 6–0 win over Red Star on the road, in which Robert Lewandowski matched Gnabry's total and set a UEFA individual record: his four goals were all scored in a 15-minute spell. Their domestic form was not as consistent until Hansi Flick (a member of the 1987 European Cup Final team) took over as head coach, dropping only two Bundesliga points after mid-December. The good European showings continued into the knockout stages with a 7–1 aggregate win over Chelsea (the two legs played five months apart due to the COVID-19 pandemic in Europe) followed by an 8–2 victory over Barcelona to reach the semi-finals in a single match played in Lisbon as part of an altered format for the closing stages due to the pandemic – the result being the Catalans' heaviest ever defeat in Europe and the first time they had conceded as many goals in any competition since 1946, plus the first occasion that Bayern had scored eight in Europe since 1983 and the first time since 2003 that any team had scored as many in the Champions League. With the domestic league and cup already secured, the team went on to comfortably beat Lyon 3–0 in the semi-finals and then defeat Paris Saint-Germain 1–0 in the final with a goal from Kingsley Coman (a former PSG player), thus conquering its sixth European Cup and second continental treble. Additionally, Bayern became the first team to claim any European competition with a 100% winning record.

2020 UEFA Champions League final

23 August 2020	Paris Saint-Germain (France)	0–1	(Germany) Bayern Munich	Estádio da Luz, Lisbon
20:00 UTC+1		Report	Coman 59'	Attendance: 0 (Note: The later stages of the competition, held in August 2020, were played behind closed doors due to the COVID-19 pandemic in Europe.); Referee: Daniele Orsato (Italy)

=== 2020s ===
Bayern met six-time Europa League winners Sevilla in the 2020 UEFA Super Cup. The game was tightly contested, and Sevilla pulled ahead early in the game thanks to a Lucas Ocampos penalty. Bayern equalised through Leon Goretzka and saw two goals disallowed by the Video assistant referee system in the second half with Manuel Neuer making a crucial save from Youssef En-Nesyri. In extra time, Javi Martínez scored the decisive goal with a header to bring the trophy to Munich for a second time. Amid ongoing COVID-19 restrictions across the world, the match was also the first major football event to feature spectators, albeit in limited numbers.

2020 UEFA Super Cup

24 September 2020	Bayern Munich (Germany)	2–1 (a.e.t.)	(Spain) Sevilla	Puskás Aréna, Budapest
21:00 CEST	Goretzka 34'; Martínez 104'	Report	Ocampos 13' (pen.)	Attendance: 15,180; Referee: Anthony Taylor (England)

Bayern met Mexican club Tigres UANL, representing CONCACAF as the reigning champions of the CONCACAF Champions League in the 2020 FIFA Club World Cup. It was the first time a team from the CONCACAF region played in the final. The final was originally scheduled to be played in December 2020, but was moved to February due to the impact of the COVID-19 pandemic on the scheduling of the various continental club competitions. Bayern Munich won the match 1–0 for their second FIFA Club World Cup title and fourth club world championship. With the win, Bayern became the second European team to complete a sextuple (six trophies in a year) after Barcelona in 2009; they had won a continental treble in the previous season, along with their domestic and continental super cups in the 2020–21 campaign.

2020 FIFA Club World Cup final

11 February 2021	Bayern Munich (Germany)	1–0	(Mexico) Tigres UANL	Education City Stadium, Al Rayyan
21:00 AST	Pavard 59'	Report		Attendance: 7,411; Referee: Esteban Ostojich (Uruguay)

Having safely negotiated the group stage in the autumn, when Champions League ties resumed in early 2021, a re-match of the previous final at the quarter-final stage saw Paris Saint-Germain exact some revenge over Bayern. Their 3–2 first leg win in Munich was the first time the holders had lost an international game since 2019 (a run of 21 victories and one draw); a 1–0 victory for the Germans in Paris was not enough, with elimination on away goals (in the last season that rule would be in use). A ninth successive Bundesliga title ensured the club made a swift return to the competition.

The 2021–22 UEFA Champions League campaign was a disappointing one: despite dominating their group, which included Barcelona, and finishing with a maximum 18 points, Bayern were eliminated in the quarter-finals by underdogs Villarreal 1–2 on aggregate and were knocked out at that stage for the second year in a row. As in previous years, a Bundesliga title meant the Bavarians would return to the competition the following year.

== Records ==
=== UEFA annual ranking ===
The table below shows the points gained by Bayern Munich over the past ten seasons, according to the UEFA coefficient, and the club's ranking among clubs across Europe – this is used primarily for qualification seeding purposes in the continental tournaments for the upcoming season.

As of end of 2025–26 season.

==== Five-year points ====
Club	Points gained in season					5 years	
Club	2021–22	2022–23	2023–24	2024–25	2025–26	Total	Rank
(Germany) Bayern Munich	26.000	27.000	28.000	27.250	39.250	147.500	1
(Spain) Real Madrid	30.000	29.000	34.000	24.500	27.000	144.500	2
(France) Paris Saint-Germain	19.000	19.000	23.000	33.500	37.500	132.000	3
(England) Liverpool	33.000	19.000	20.000	29.500	28.500	130.000	4
(Italy) Internazionale	18.000	29.000	20.000	40.250	19.750	127.000	5

==== Ten-year points ====
Club	Points gained in season										Bonus points	10 years	
Club	2016–17	2017–18	2018–19	2019–20	2020–21	2021–22	2022–23	2023–24	2024–25	2025–26	Bonus points	Total	Rank
(Germany) Bayern Munich	22.000	29.000	20.000	36.000	27.000	26.000	27.000	28.000	27.250	39.250	0	281.500	1
(Spain) Real Madrid	33.000	32.000	19.000	17.000	26.000	30.000	29.000	34.000	24.500	27.000	0	271.500	2
(England) Manchester City	18.000	22.000	25.000	25.000	35.000	27.000	33.000	28.000	14.750	22.750	0	250.500	3
(France) Paris Saint-Germain	20.000	19.000	19.000	31.000	24.000	19.000	19.000	23.000	33.500	37.500	0	245.000	4
(Spain) Barcelona	23.000	25.000	30.000	24.000	20.000	15.000	9.000	23.000	36.250	30.000	0	235.250	5

=== Results summary by competition ===
As of 6 November 2026

Competition	Record							
Competition	Pld	W	D	L	GF	GA	GD	Win %
UEFA Champions League / European Cup	426	257	84	85	911	429	+482	60.33
UEFA Europa League / UEFA Cup	68	39	13	16	151	82	+69	57.35
UEFA Cup Winners' Cup	39	19	14	6	67	36	+31	48.72
UEFA Super Cup	7	2	1	4	9	14	−5	28.57
Inter-Cities Fairs Cup	13	6	3	4	25	15	+10	46.15
Intercontinental Cup	3	2	1	0	3	0	+3	66.67
FIFA Club World Cup	9	7	0	2	24	6	+18	77.78
Total	565	332	116	117	1,190	582	+608	58.76

=== Overall results by season ===
As of 6 November 2026

Season	Competition	Round	Opposition	First leg	Second leg	Agg.	Ref.
1962–63	Fairs Cup	First round	(Switzerland) Basel XI	3–0 (A)	(Note: Basel XI withdrew after the first leg.)	3–0	
1962–63	Fairs Cup	Second round	(Republic of Ireland) Drumcondra	6–0 (H)	0–1 (A)	6–1	
1962–63	Fairs Cup	Quarter-final	(Socialist Federal Republic of Yugoslavia) Dinamo Zagreb	1–4 (H)	0–0 (A)	1–4	
1966–67	Cup Winners' Cup	First round	(Czechoslovakia) Tatran Presov	1–1 (A)	3–2 (H)	4–3	
1966–67	Cup Winners' Cup	Second round	(Republic of Ireland) Shamrock Rovers	1–1 (A)	3–2 (H)	4–3	
1966–67	Cup Winners' Cup	Quarter-final	(Austria) Rapid Wien	0–1 (A)	2–0 (H) (Note: After extra time.)	2–1	
1966–67	Cup Winners' Cup	Semi-final	(Belgium) Standard Liège	2–0 (H)	3–1 (A)	5–1	
1966–67	Cup Winners' Cup	Final	(Scotland) Rangers	1–0 (N)			
1967–68	Cup Winners' Cup	First round	(Greece) Panathinaikos	5–0 (H)	2–1 (A)	7–1	
1967–68	Cup Winners' Cup	Second round	(Portugal) Vitória de Setúbal	6–2 (H)	1–1 (A)	7–3	
1967–68	Cup Winners' Cup	Quarter-final	(Spain) Valencia	1–1 (A)	1–0 (H)	2–1	
1967–68	Cup Winners' Cup	Semi-final	(Italy) Milan	0–2 (A)	0–0 (H)	0–2	
1969–70	European Cup	First round	(France) Saint-Étienne	2–0 (H)	0–3 (A)	2–3	
1970–71	Fairs Cup	First round	(Scotland) Rangers	1–0 (H)	1–1 (A)	2–1	
1970–71	Fairs Cup	Second round	(England) Coventry City	6–1 (H)	1–2 (A)	7–3	
1970–71	Fairs Cup	Third round	(Netherlands) Sparta Rotterdam	2–1 (H)	3–1 (A)	5–2	
1970–71	Fairs Cup	Quarter-final	(England) Liverpool	0–3 (A)	1–1 (H)	1–4	
1971–72	Cup Winners' Cup	First round	(Czechoslovakia) Škoda Plzeň	1–0 (A)	6–1 (H)	7–1	
1971–72	Cup Winners' Cup	Second round	(England) Liverpool	0–0 (A)	3–1 (H)	3–1	
1971–72	Cup Winners' Cup	Quarter-final	(Romania) Steaua București	1–1 (A)	0–0 (H)	1–1 (Note: Away goals rule applied.)	
1971–72	Cup Winners' Cup	Semi-final	(Scotland) Rangers	1–1 (H)	0–2 (A)	1–3	
1972–73	European Cup	First round	(Turkey) Galatasaray	1–1 (A)	6–0 (H)	7–1	
1972–73	European Cup	Second round	(Cyprus) Omonia Nicosia	9–0 (H)	4–0 (A)	13–0	
1972–73	European Cup	Quarter-final	(Netherlands) Ajax	0–4 (A)	2–1 (H)	2–5	
1973–74	European Cup	First round	(Sweden) Åtvidaberg	3–1 (H)	1–3 (A)	4–4 (Note: Bayern won 4–3 in a penalty shoot-out.)	
1973–74	European Cup	Second round	(East Germany) Dynamo Dresden	4–3 (H)	3–3 (A)	7–6	
1973–74	European Cup	Quarter-final	(Bulgaria) CSKA Sofia	4–1 (H)	1–2 (A)	5–3	
1973–74	European Cup	Semi-final	(Hungary) Újpest Dózsa	1–1 (A)	3–0 (H)	4–1	
1973–74	European Cup	Final	(Spain) Atlético Madrid	1–1 (N)	4–0 (R) (N)	4–0	
1974–75	European Cup	Second round (Note: Received a bye in the First round as defending champions.)	(East Germany) 1. FC Magdeburg	3–2 (H)	2–1 (A)	5–3	
1974–75	European Cup	Quarter-final	(Soviet Union) Ararat Yerevan	2–0 (H)	0–1 (A)	2–1	
1974–75	European Cup	Semi-final	(France) Saint-Étienne	0–0 (A)	2–0 (H)	2–0	
1974–75	European Cup	Final	(England) Leeds United	2–0 (N)			
1975	Super Cup	Final	(Soviet Union) Dynamo Kyiv	0–1 (H)	0–2 (A)	0–3	
1975–76	European Cup	First round	(Luxembourg) Jeunesse Esch	5–0 (A)	3–1 (H)	8–1	
1975–76	European Cup	Second round	(Sweden) Malmö FF	0–1 (A)	2–0 (H)	2–1	
1975–76	European Cup	Quarter-final	(Portugal) Benfica	0–0 (A)	5–1 (H)	5–1	
1975–76	European Cup	Semi-final	(Spain) Real Madrid	1–1 (A)	2–0 (H)	3–1	
1975–76	European Cup	Final	(France) Saint-Étienne	1–0 (N)			
1976	Super Cup	Final	(Belgium) Anderlecht	2–1 (H)	1–4 (A)	3–5	
1976	Intercontinental Cup	Final	(Brazil) Cruzeiro	2–0 (H)	0–0 (A)	2–0	
1976–77	European Cup	First round	(Denmark) Køge	5–0 (A)	2–1 (H)	7–1	
1976–77	European Cup	Second round	(Czechoslovakia) Baník Ostrava	1–2 (A)	5–0 (H)	6–2	
1976–77	European Cup	Quarter-final	(Soviet Union) Dynamo Kyiv	1–0 (H)	0–2 (A)	1–2	
1977–78	UEFA Cup	First round	(Norway) Mjøndalen	8–0 (H)	4–0 (A)	12–0	
1977–78	UEFA Cup	Second round	(Bulgaria) Marek Dupnitsa	3–0 (H)	0–2 (A)	3–2	
1977–78	UEFA Cup	Third round	(West Germany) Eintracht Frankfurt	0–4 (A)	1–2 (H)	1–6	
1979–80	UEFA Cup	First round	(Czechoslovakia) Bohemians Prague	2–0 (A)	2–2 (H)	4–2	
1979–80	UEFA Cup	Second round	(Denmark) AGF	2–1 (A)	3–1 (H)	5–2	
1979–80	UEFA Cup	Third round	(Socialist Federal Republic of Yugoslavia) Red Star Belgrade	2–0 (H)	2–3 (A)	4–3	
1979–80	UEFA Cup	Quarter-final	(West Germany) 1. FC Kaiserslautern	0–1 (A)	4–1 (H)	4–2	
1979–80	UEFA Cup	Semi-final	(West Germany) Eintracht Frankfurt	2–0 (H)	1–5 (A)	3–5	
1980–81	European Cup	First round	(Greece) Olympiacos	4–2 (A)	3–0 (H)	7–2	
1980–81	European Cup	Second round	(Netherlands) Ajax	5–1 (H)	1–2 (A)	6–3	
1980–81	European Cup	Quarter-final	(Czechoslovakia) Baník Ostrava	2–0 (H)	4–2 (A)	6–2	
1980–81	European Cup	Semi-final	(England) Liverpool	0–0 (A)	1–1 (H)	1–1	
1981–82	European Cup	First round	(Sweden) Öster	1–0 (A)	5–0 (H)	6–0	
1981–82	European Cup	Second round	(Portugal) Benfica	0–0 (A)	4–1 (H)	4–1	
1981–82	European Cup	Quarter-final	(Romania) Universitatea Craiova	2–0 (A)	1–1 (H)	3–1	
1981–82	European Cup	Semi-final	(Bulgaria) CSKA Sofia	3–4 (A)	4–0 (H)	7–4	
1981–82	European Cup	Final	(England) Aston Villa	0–1 (N)			
1982–83	Cup Winners' Cup	First round	(Soviet Union) Torpedo Moscow	1–1 (A)	0–0 (H)	1–1	
1982–83	Cup Winners' Cup	Second round	(England) Tottenham Hotspur	1–1 (A)	4–1 (H)	5–2	
1982–83	Cup Winners' Cup	Quarter-final	(Scotland) Aberdeen	0–0 (H)	2–3 (A)	2–3	
1983–84	UEFA Cup	First round	(Cyprus) Anorthosis	1–0 (A)	10–0 (H)	11–0	
1983–84	UEFA Cup	Second round	(Greece) PAOK	0–0 (A)	0–0 (H) (Note: Bayern won 9–8 in a penalty shoot-out.)	0–0	
1983–84	UEFA Cup	Third round	(England) Tottenham Hotspur	1–0 (H)	0–2 (A)	1–2	
1984–85	Cup Winners' Cup	First round	(Norway) Moss	4–1 (H)	2–1 (A)	6–2	
1984–85	Cup Winners' Cup	Second round	(Bulgaria) Trakia Plovdiv	4–1 (H)	0–2 (A)	4–3	
1984–85	Cup Winners' Cup	Quarter-final	(Italy) Roma	2–0 (H)	2–1 (A)	4–1	
1984–85	Cup Winners' Cup	Semi-final	(England) Everton	0–0 (H)	1–3 (A)	1–3	
1985–86	European Cup	First round	(Poland) Górnik Zabrze	2–1 (A)	4–1 (H)	6–2	
1985–86	European Cup	Second round	Austria Wien	4–2 (H)	3–3 (A)	7–5	
1985–86	European Cup	Quarter-final	(Belgium) Anderlecht	2–1 (H)	0–2 (A)	2–3	
1986–87	European Cup	First round	(Netherlands) PSV Eindhoven	2–0 (A)	0–0 (H)	2–0	
1986–87	European Cup	Second round	Austria Wien	2–0 (H)	1–1 (A)	3–1	
1986–87	European Cup	Quarter-final	(Belgium) Anderlecht	5–0 (H)	2–2 (A)	7–2	
1986–87	European Cup	Semi-final	(Spain) Real Madrid	4–1 (H)	0–1 (A)	4–2	
1986–87	European Cup	Final	(Portugal) Porto	1–2 (N)			
1987–88	European Cup	First round	(Bulgaria) CSKA Sofia	4–0 (H)	1–0 (A)	5–0	
1987–88	European Cup	Second round	(Switzerland) Neuchâtel Xamax	1–2 (A)	2–0 (H)	3–2	
1987–88	European Cup	Quarter-final	(Spain) Real Madrid	3–2 (H)	0–2 (A)	3–4	
1988–89	UEFA Cup	First round	(Poland) Legia Warsaw	3–1 (H)	7–3 (A)	10–4	
1988–89	UEFA Cup	Second round	(Czechoslovakia) DAC	3–1 (H)	2–0 (A)	5–1	
1988–89	UEFA Cup	Third round	(Italy) Internazionale	0–2 (H)	3–1 (A)	3–3	
1988–89	UEFA Cup	Quarter-final	(Scotland) Heart of Midlothian	0–1 (A)	2–0 (H)	2–1	
1988–89	UEFA Cup	Semi-final	(Italy) Napoli	0–2 (A)	2–2 (H)	2–4	
1989–90	European Cup	First round	(Scotland) Rangers	3–1 (H)	0–0 (A)	3–1	
1989–90	European Cup	Second round	(Albania) 17 Nëntori Tirana	3–1 (H)	3–0 (A)	6–1	
1989–90	European Cup	Quarter-final	(Netherlands) PSV Eindhoven	2–1 (H)	1–0 (A)	3–1	
1989–90	European Cup	Semi-final	(Italy) Milan	0–1 (A)	2–1 (H)	2–2	
1990–91	European Cup	First round	(Cyprus) APOEL	3–2 (A)	4–0 (H)	7–2	
1990–91	European Cup	Second round	(Bulgaria) CSKA Sofia	4–0 (H)	3–0 (A)	7–0	
1990–91	European Cup	Quarter-final	(Portugal) Porto	1–1 (H)	2–0 (A)	3–1	
1990–91	European Cup	Semi-final	(Socialist Federal Republic of Yugoslavia) Red Star Belgrade	1–2 (H)	2–2 (A)	3–4	
1991–92	UEFA Cup	First round	(Republic of Ireland) Cork City	1–1 (A)	2–0 (H)	3–1	
1991–92	UEFA Cup	Second round	(Denmark) B 1903	2–6 (A)	1–0 (H)	3–6	
1993–94	UEFA Cup	First round	(Netherlands) Twente	4–3 (A)	3–0 (H)	7–3	
1993–94	UEFA Cup	Second round	(England) Norwich City	1–2 (H)	1–1 (A)	2–3	
1994–95	Champions League	Group B	(France) Paris Saint-Germain	0–2 (A)	0–1 (H)	2nd	
1994–95	Champions League	Group B	(Ukraine) Dynamo Kyiv	1–0 (H)	4–1 (A)	2nd	
1994–95	Champions League	Group B	(Russia) Spartak Moscow	1–1 (A)	2–2 (H)	2nd	
1994–95	Champions League	Quarter-final	(Sweden) IFK Göteborg	0–0 (H)	2–2 (A)	2–2	
1994–95	Champions League	Semi-final	(Netherlands) Ajax	0–0 (H)	2–5 (A)	2–5	
1995–96	UEFA Cup	First round	(Russia) Lokomotiv Moscow	0–1 (H)	5–0 (A)	5–1	
1995–96	UEFA Cup	Second round	(Scotland) Raith Rovers	2–0 (A) (Note: Played at Easter Road in Edinburgh.)	2–1 (H)	4–1	
1995–96	UEFA Cup	Third round	(Portugal) Benfica	4–1 (H)	3–1 (A)	7–2	
1995–96	UEFA Cup	Quarter-final	(England) Nottingham Forest	2–1 (H)	5–1 (A)	7–2	
1995–96	UEFA Cup	Semi-final	(Spain) Barcelona	2–2 (H)	2–1 (A)	4–3	
1995–96	UEFA Cup	Final	(France) Bordeaux	2–0 (H)	3–1 (A)	5–1	
1996–97	UEFA Cup	First round	(Spain) Valencia	0–3 (A)	1–0 (H)	1–3	
1997–98	Champions League	Group E	(Turkey) Beşiktaş	2–0 (H)	2–0 (A)	1st	
1997–98	Champions League	Group E	(Sweden) IFK Göteborg	3–1 (A)	0–1 (H)	1st	
1997–98	Champions League	Group E	(France) Paris Saint-Germain	5–1 (H)	1–3 (A)	1st	
1997–98	Champions League	Quarter-final	(Germany) Borussia Dortmund	0–0 (H)	0–1 (A)	0–1	
1998–99	Champions League	2QR	(Federal Republic of Yugoslavia) Obilić	4–0 (H)	1–1 (A) (Note: Played at Partizan Stadium, Belgrade.)	5–1	
1998–99	Champions League	Group D	(Denmark) Brøndby	1–2 (A)	2–0 (H)	1st	
1998–99	Champions League	Group D	(England) Manchester United	2–2 (H)	1–1 (A)	1st	
1998–99	Champions League	Group D	(Spain) Barcelona	1–0 (H)	2–1 (A)	1st	
1998–99	Champions League	Quarter-final	(Germany) 1. FC Kaiserslautern	2–0 (H)	4–0 (A)	6–0	
1998–99	Champions League	Semi-final	(Ukraine) Dynamo Kyiv	3–3 (A)	1–0 (H)	4–3	
1998–99	Champions League	Final	(England) Manchester United	1–2 (N)			
1999–2000	Champions League	Group 1F	(Netherlands) PSV Eindhoven	2–1 (H)	1–2 (A)	1st	
1999–2000	Champions League	Group 1F	(Spain) Valencia	1–1 (H)	1–1 (A)	1st	
1999–2000	Champions League	Group 1F	(Scotland) Rangers	1–1 (A)	1–0 (H)	1st	
1999–2000	Champions League	Group 2C	(Norway) Rosenborg	1–1 (A)	2–1 (H)	1st	
1999–2000	Champions League	Group 2C	(Ukraine) Dynamo Kyiv	2–1 (H)	0–2 (A)	1st	
1999–2000	Champions League	Group 2C	(Spain) Real Madrid	4–2 (A)	4–1 (H)	1st	
1999–2000	Champions League	Quarter-final	(Portugal) Porto	1–1 (A)	2–1 (H)	3–2	
1999–2000	Champions League	Semi-final	(Spain) Real Madrid	0–2 (A)	2–1 (H)	2–3	
2000–01	Champions League	Group 1F	(Sweden) Helsingborg	3–1 (A)	0–0 (H)	1st	
2000–01	Champions League	Group 1F	(Norway) Rosenborg	3–1 (H)	1–1 (A)	1st	
2000–01	Champions League	Group 1F	(France) Paris Saint-Germain	0–1 (A)	2–0 (H)	1st	
2000–01	Champions League	Group 2C	(France) Lyon	1–0 (H)	0–3 (A)	1st	
2000–01	Champions League	Group 2C	(England) Arsenal	2–2 (A)	1–0 (H)	1st	
2000–01	Champions League	Group 2C	(Russia) Spartak Moscow	1–0 (H)	3–0 (A)	1st	
2000–01	Champions League	Quarter-final	(England) Manchester United	1–0 (A)	2–1 (H)	3–1	
2000–01	Champions League	Semi-final	(Spain) Real Madrid	1–0 (A)	2–1 (H)	3–1	
2000–01	Champions League	Final	(Spain) Valencia	1–1 (Note: Bayern won 5–4 in a penalty shoot-out.) (N)			
2001	Super Cup	Final	(England) Liverpool	2–3 (N)			
2001	Intercontinental Cup	Final	(Argentina) Boca Juniors	1–0 (N)			
2001–02	Champions League	Group 1H	(Czech Republic) Sparta Prague	0–0 (H)	1–0 (A)	1st	
2001–02	Champions League	Group 1H	(Russia) Spartak Moscow	3–1 (A)	5–1 (H)	1st	
2001–02	Champions League	Group 1H	(Netherlands) Feyenoord	2–2 (A)	3–1 (H)	1st	
2001–02	Champions League	Group 2A	(England) Manchester United	1–1 (H)	0–0 (A)	2nd	
2001–02	Champions League	Group 2A	(France) Nantes	1–0 (A)	2–1 (H)	2nd	
2001–02	Champions League	Group 2A	(Portugal) Boavista	0–0 (A)	1–0 (H)	2nd	
2001–02	Champions League	Quarter-final	(Spain) Real Madrid	2–1 (H)	0–2 (A)	2–3	
2002–03	Champions League	3QR	(Federal Republic of Yugoslavia) Partizan	3–0 (A)	3–1 (H)	6–1	
2002–03	Champions League	Group 1G	(Spain) Deportivo La Coruña	2–3 (H)	1–2 (A)	4th	
2002–03	Champions League	Group 1G	(France) Lens	1–1 (A)	3–3 (H)	4th	
2002–03	Champions League	Group 1G	(Italy) Milan	1–2 (H)	1–2 (A)	4th	
2003–04	Champions League	Group A	(Scotland) Celtic	2–1 (H)	0–0 (A)	2nd	
2003–04	Champions League	Group A	(Belgium) Anderlecht	1–1 (A)	1–0 (H)	2nd	
2003–04	Champions League	Group A	(France) Lyon	1–1 (A)	1–2 (H)	2nd	
2003–04	Champions League	Round of 16	(Spain) Real Madrid	1–1 (H)	0–1 (A)	1–2	
2004–05	Champions League	Group C	(Israel) Maccabi Tel Aviv	1–0 (A)	5–1 (H)	2nd	
2004–05	Champions League	Group C	(Netherlands) Ajax	4–0 (H)	2–2 (A)	2nd	
2004–05	Champions League	Group C	(Italy) Juventus	0–1 (A)	0–1 (H)	2nd	
2004–05	Champions League	Round of 16	(England) Arsenal	3–1 (H)	0–1 (A)	3–2	
2004–05	Champions League	Quarter-final	(England) Chelsea	2–4 (A)	3–2 (H)	5–6	
2005–06	Champions League	Group A	(Austria) Rapid Wien	1–0 (A)	4–0 (H)	2nd	
2005–06	Champions League	Group A	(Belgium) Club Brugge	1–0 (H)	1–1 (A)	2nd	
2005–06	Champions League	Group A	(Italy) Juventus	2–1 (H)	1–2 (A)	2nd	
2005–06	Champions League	Round of 16	(Italy) Milan	1–1 (H)	1–4 (A)	2–5	
2006–07	Champions League	Group B	(Russia) Spartak Moscow	4–0 (H)	2–2 (A)	1st	
2006–07	Champions League	Group B	(Italy) Internazionale	2–0 (A)	1–1 (H)	1st	
2006–07	Champions League	Group B	(Portugal) Sporting CP	1–0 (A)	0–0 (H)	1st	
2006–07	Champions League	Round of 16	(Spain) Real Madrid	2–3 (A)	2–1 (H)	4–4	
2006–07	Champions League	Quarter-final	(Italy) Milan	2–2 (A)	0–2 (H)	2–4	
2007–08	UEFA Cup	First round	(Portugal) Belenenses	1–0 (H)	2–0 (A)	3–0	
2007–08	UEFA Cup	Group F	(Serbia) Red Star Belgrade	3–2 (A)		1st	
2007–08	UEFA Cup	Group F	(England) Bolton Wanderers	2–2 (H)		1st	
2007–08	UEFA Cup	Group F	(Portugal) Braga	1–1 (A)		1st	
2007–08	UEFA Cup	Group F	(Greece) Aris	6–0 (H)		1st	
2007–08	UEFA Cup	Round of 32	(Scotland) Aberdeen	2–2 (A)	5–1 (H)	7–3	
2007–08	UEFA Cup	Round of 16	(Belgium) Anderlecht	5–0 (A)	1–2 (H)	6–2	
2007–08	UEFA Cup	Quarter-final	(Spain) Getafe	1–1 (H)	3–3 (A)	4–4	
2007–08	UEFA Cup	Semi-final	(Russia) Zenit Saint Petersburg	1–1 (H)	0–4 (A)	1–5	
2008–09	Champions League	Group F	(Romania) Steaua București	1–0 (A)	3–0 (H)	1st	
2008–09	Champions League	Group F	(France) Lyon	1–1 (H)	3–2 (A)	1st	
2008–09	Champions League	Group F	(Italy) Fiorentina	3–0 (H)	1–1 (A)	1st	
2008–09	Champions League	Round of 16	(Portugal) Sporting CP	5–0 (A)	7–1 (H)	12–1	
2008–09	Champions League	Quarter-final	(Spain) Barcelona	0–4 (A)	1–1 (H)	1–5	
2009–10	Champions League	Group A	(Israel) Maccabi Haifa	3–0 (A)	1–0 (H)	2nd	
2009–10	Champions League	Group A	(Italy) Juventus	0–0 (H)	4–1 (A)	2nd	
2009–10	Champions League	Group A	(France) Bordeaux	1–2 (A)	0–2 (H)	2nd	
2009–10	Champions League	Round of 16	(Italy) Fiorentina	2–1 (H)	2–3 (A)	4–4	
2009–10	Champions League	Quarter-final	(England) Manchester United	2–1 (H)	2–3 (A)	4–4	
2009–10	Champions League	Semi-final	(France) Lyon	1–0 (H)	3–0 (A)	4–0	
2009–10	Champions League	Final	(Italy) Internazionale	0–2 (N)			
2010–11	Champions League	Group E	(Italy) Roma	2–0 (H)	2–3 (A)	1st	
2010–11	Champions League	Group E	(Switzerland) Basel	2–1 (A)	3–0 (H)	1st	
2010–11	Champions League	Group E	(Romania) CFR Cluj	3–2 (H)	4–0 (A)	1st	
2010–11	Champions League	Round of 16	(Italy) Internazionale	1–0 (A)	2–3 (H)	3–3	
2011–12	Champions League	Play-off	(Switzerland) Zürich	2–0 (H)	1–0 (A)	3–0	
2011–12	Champions League	Group A	(Spain) Villarreal	2–0 (A)	3–1 (H)	1st	
2011–12	Champions League	Group A	(England) Manchester City	2–0 (H)	0–2 (A)	1st	
2011–12	Champions League	Group A	(Italy) Napoli	1–1 (A)	3–2 (H)	1st	
2011–12	Champions League	Round of 16	(Switzerland) Basel	0–1 (A)	7–0 (H)	7–1	
2011–12	Champions League	Quarter-final	(France) Marseille	2–0 (A)	2–0 (H)	4–0	
2011–12	Champions League	Semi-final	(Spain) Real Madrid	2–1 (H)	1–2 (A)	3–3 (Note: Bayern won 3–1 in a penalty shoot-out.)	
2011–12	Champions League	Final	(England) Chelsea	1–1 (Note: Bayern lost 4–3 in a penalty shoot-out.) (N) (Note: The 2012 UEFA Champions League final was played at Bayern's home stadium, the Allianz Arena but this had been pre-arranged and it was technically a neutral venue.)			
2012–13	Champions League	Group F	(Spain) Valencia	2–1 (H)	1–1 (A)	1st	
2012–13	Champions League	Group F	(Belarus) BATE Borisov	1–3 (A)	4–1 (H)	1st	
2012–13	Champions League	Group F	(France) Lille	1–0 (A)	6–1 (H)	1st	
2012–13	Champions League	Round of 16	(England) Arsenal	3–1 (A)	0–2 (H)	3–3	
2012–13	Champions League	Quarter-final	(Italy) Juventus	2–0 (H)	2–0 (A)	4–0	
2012–13	Champions League	Semi-final	(Spain) Barcelona	4–0 (H)	3–0 (A)	7–0	
2012–13	Champions League	Final	(Germany) Borussia Dortmund	2–1 (N)			
2013	Super Cup	Final	(England) Chelsea	2–2 (N) (Note: Bayern won 5–4 in a penalty shoot-out.)			
2013	Club World Cup	Semi-final	(China) Guangzhou Evergrande	3–0 (N)			
2013	Club World Cup	Final	(Morocco) Raja Casablanca	2–0 (N)			
2013–14	Champions League	Group D	(Russia) CSKA Moscow	3–0 (H)	3–1 (A)	1st	
2013–14	Champions League	Group D	(England) Manchester City	3–1 (A)	2–3 (H)	1st	
2013–14	Champions League	Group D	(Czech Republic) Viktoria Plzeň	5–0 (H)	1–0 (A)	1st	
2013–14	Champions League	Round of 16	(England) Arsenal	2–0 (A)	1–1 (H)	3–1	
2013–14	Champions League	Quarter-final	(England) Manchester United	1–1 (A)	3–1 (H)	4–2	
2013–14	Champions League	Semi-final	(Spain) Real Madrid	0–1 (A)	0–4 (H)	0–5	
2014–15	Champions League	Group E	(England) Manchester City	1–0 (H)	2–3 (A)	1st	
2014–15	Champions League	Group E	(Russia) CSKA Moscow	1–0 (A)	3–0 (H)	1st	
2014–15	Champions League	Group E	(Italy) Roma	7–1 (A)	2–0 (H)	1st	
2014–15	Champions League	Round of 16	(Ukraine) Shakhtar Donetsk	0–0 (A)	7–0 (H)	7–0	
2014–15	Champions League	Quarter-final	(Portugal) Porto	1–3 (A)	6–1 (H)	7–4	
2014–15	Champions League	Semi-final	(Spain) Barcelona	0–3 (A)	3–2 (H)	3–5	
2015–16	Champions League	Group F	(Greece) Olympiacos	3–0 (A)	4–0 (H)	1st	
2015–16	Champions League	Group F	(Croatia) Dinamo Zagreb	5–0 (H)	2–0 (A)	1st	
2015–16	Champions League	Group F	(England) Arsenal	0–2 (A)	5–1 (H)	1st	
2015–16	Champions League	Round of 16	(Italy) Juventus	2–2 (A)	4–2 (H)	6–4	
2015–16	Champions League	Quarter-final	(Portugal) Benfica	1–0 (H)	2–2 (A)	3–2	
2015–16	Champions League	Semi-final	(Spain) Atlético Madrid	0–1 (A)	2–1 (H)	2–2	
2016–17	Champions League	Group D	(Russia) Rostov	5–0 (H)	2–3 (A)	2nd	
2016–17	Champions League	Group D	(Spain) Atlético Madrid	0–1 (A)	1–0 (H)	2nd	
2016–17	Champions League	Group D	(Netherlands) PSV Eindhoven	4–1 (H)	2–1 (A)	2nd	
2016–17	Champions League	Round of 16	(England) Arsenal	5–1 (H)	5–1 (A)	10–2	
2016–17	Champions League	Quarter-final	(Spain) Real Madrid	1–2 (H)	2–4 (A)	3–6	
2017–18	Champions League	Group B	(Belgium) Anderlecht	3–0 (H)	2–1 (A)	2nd	
2017–18	Champions League	Group B	(France) Paris Saint-Germain	0–3 (A)	3–1 (H)	2nd	
2017–18	Champions League	Group B	(Scotland) Celtic	3–0 (H)	2–1 (A)	2nd	
2017–18	Champions League	Round of 16	(Turkey) Beşiktaş	5–0 (H)	3–1 (A)	8–1	
2017–18	Champions League	Quarter-final	(Spain) Sevilla	2–1 (A)	0–0 (H)	2–1	
2017–18	Champions League	Semi-final	(Spain) Real Madrid	1–2 (H)	2–2 (A)	3–4	
2018–19	Champions League	Group E	(Portugal) Benfica	2–0 (A)	5–1 (H)	1st	
2018–19	Champions League	Group E	(Netherlands) Ajax	1–1 (H)	3–3 (A)	1st	
2018–19	Champions League	Group E	(Greece) AEK Athens	2–0 (A)	2–0 (H)	1st	
2018–19	Champions League	Round of 16	(England) Liverpool	0–0 (A)	1–3 (H)	1–3	
2019–20	Champions League	Group B	(England) Tottenham Hotspur	7–2 (A)	3–1 (H)	1st	
2019–20	Champions League	Group B	(Greece) Olympiacos	3–2 (A)	2–0 (H)	1st	
2019–20	Champions League	Group B	(Serbia) Red Star Belgrade	3–0 (H)	6–0 (A)	1st	
2019–20	Champions League	Round of 16	(England) Chelsea	3–0 (A)	4–1 (H)	7–1	
2019–20	Champions League	Quarter-final	(Spain) Barcelona	8–2 (N) (Note: Played as a single match in Lisbon, Portugal in an amended format due to delays caused by the COVID-19 pandemic in Europe.)			
2019–20	Champions League	Semi-final	(France) Lyon	3–0 (N)			
2019–20	Champions League	Final	(France) Paris Saint-Germain	1–0 (N)			
2020	Super Cup	Final	(Spain) Sevilla	2–1 (N)			
2020	Club World Cup	Semi-final	(Egypt) Al Ahly	2–0 (N)			
2020	Club World Cup	Final	(Mexico) Tigres UANL	1–0 (N)			
2020–21	Champions League	Group A	(Spain) Atlético Madrid	4–0 (H)	1–1 (A)	1st	
2020–21	Champions League	Group A	(Austria) Red Bull Salzburg	6–2 (A)	3–1 (H)	1st	
2020–21	Champions League	Group A	(Russia) Lokomotiv Moscow	2–1 (A)	2–0 (H)	1st	
2020–21	Champions League	Round of 16	(Italy) Lazio	4–1 (A)	2–1 (H)	6–2	
2020–21	Champions League	Quarter-final	(France) Paris Saint-Germain	2–3 (H)	1–0 (A)	3–3	
2021–22	Champions League	Group E	(Spain) Barcelona	3–0 (A)	3–0 (H)	1st	
2021–22	Champions League	Group E	(Ukraine) Dynamo Kyiv	5–0 (H)	2–1 (A)	1st	
2021–22	Champions League	Group E	(Portugal) Benfica	4–0 (A)	5–2 (H)	1st	
2021–22	Champions League	Round of 16	(Austria) Red Bull Salzburg	1–1 (A)	7–1 (H)	8–2	
2021–22	Champions League	Quarter-final	(Spain) Villarreal	0–1 (A)	1–1 (H)	1–2	
2022–23	Champions League	Group C	(Italy) Internazionale	2–0 (A)	2–0 (H)	1st	
2022–23	Champions League	Group C	(Spain) Barcelona	2–0 (H)	3–0 (A)	1st	
2022–23	Champions League	Group C	(Czech Republic) Viktoria Plzeň	5–0 (H)	4–2 (A)	1st	
2022–23	Champions League	Round of 16	(France) Paris Saint-Germain	1–0 (A)	2–0 (H)	3–0	
2022–23	Champions League	Quarter-final	(England) Manchester City	0–3 (A)	1–1 (H)	1–4	
2023–24	Champions League	Group A	(England) Manchester United	4–3 (H)	1–0 (A)	1st	
2023–24	Champions League	Group A	(Denmark) Copenhagen	2–1 (A)	0–0 (H)	1st	
2023–24	Champions League	Group A	(Turkey) Galatasaray	3–1 (A)	2–1 (H)	1st	
2023–24	Champions League	Round of 16	(Italy) Lazio	0–1 (A)	3–0 (H)	3–1	
2023–24	Champions League	Quarter-final	(England) Arsenal	2–2 (A)	1–0 (H)	3–2	
2023–24	Champions League	Semi-final	(Spain) Real Madrid	2–2 (H)	1–2 (A)	3–4	
2024–25	Champions League	League phase	(Croatia) Dinamo Zagreb	9–2 (H)		12th	
2024–25	Champions League	League phase	(England) Aston Villa	0–1 (A)		12th	
2024–25	Champions League	League phase	(Spain) Barcelona	1–4 (A)		12th	
2024–25	Champions League	League phase	(Portugal) Benfica	1–0 (H)		12th	
2024–25	Champions League	League phase	(France) Paris Saint-Germain	1–0 (H)		12th	
2024–25	Champions League	League phase	(Ukraine) Shakhtar Donetsk	5–1 (A)		12th	
2024–25	Champions League	League phase	(Netherlands) Feyenoord	0–3 (A)		12th	
2024–25	Champions League	League phase	(Slovakia) Slovan Bratislava	3–1 (H)		12th	
2024–25	Champions League	Knockout phase play-off	(Scotland) Celtic	2–1 (A)	1–1 (H)	3–2	
2024–25	Champions League	Round of 16	(Germany) Bayer Leverkusen	3–0 (H)	2–0 (A)	5–0	
2024–25	Champions League	Quarter-final	(Italy) Internazionale	1–2 (H)	2–2 (A)	3–4	
2025	Club World Cup	Group C	(New Zealand) Auckland City	10–0 (N)		2nd	
2025	Club World Cup	Group C	(Argentina) Boca Juniors	2–1 (N)		2nd	
2025	Club World Cup	Group C	(Portugal) Benfica	0–1 (N)		2nd	
2025	Club World Cup	Round of 16	(Brazil) Flamengo	4–2 (N)			
2025	Club World Cup	Quarter-final	(France) Paris Saint-Germain	0–2 (N)			
2025–26	Champions League	League phase	(England) Chelsea	3–1 (H)		2nd	
2025–26	Champions League	League phase	(Cyprus) Pafos	5–1 (A)		2nd	
2025–26	Champions League	League phase	(Belgium) Club Brugge	4–0 (H)		2nd	
2025–26	Champions League	League phase	(France) Paris Saint-Germain	2–1 (A)		2nd	
2025–26	Champions League	League phase	(England) Arsenal	1–3 (A)		2nd	
2025–26	Champions League	League phase	(Portugal) Sporting CP	3–1 (H)		2nd	
2025–26	Champions League	League phase	(Belgium) Union Saint-Gilloise	2–0 (H)		2nd	
2025–26	Champions League	League phase	(Netherlands) PSV Eindhoven	2–1 (A)		2nd	
2025–26	Champions League	Round of 16	(Italy) Atalanta	6–1 (A)	4–1 (H)	10–2	
2025–26	Champions League	Quarter-final	(Spain) Real Madrid	2–1 (A)	4–3 (H)	6–4	
2025–26	Champions League	Semi-final	(France) Paris Saint-Germain	4–5 (A)	1–1 (H)	5–6	
2026–27	Champions League	League phase	(Norway) Bodø/Glimt	5–0 (H)			
2026–27	Champions League	League phase	(Norway) Viking	3–3 (A)			
2026–27	Champions League	League phase	(England) Arsenal	2–2 (H)			
2026–27	Champions League	League phase	(Spain) Atlético Madrid	2–0 (A)			
2026–27	Champions League	League phase	(France) Lille				
2026–27	Champions League	League phase	(Czech Republic) Slavia Prague				
2026–27	Champions League	League phase	(England) Manchester United				
2026–27	Champions League	League phase	(Spain) Real Betis				

=== Overall results by opponent and country ===
As of 6 November 2026

Country	Club	Pld	W	D	L	GF	GA	GD
Albania	17 Nëntori Tirana	2	2	0	0	6	1	5
Subtotal		2	2	0	0	6	1	5
Argentina	Boca Juniors	2	2	0	0	3	1	2
Subtotal		2	2	0	0	3	1	2
Armenia	Ararat Yerevan (Note: All matches played as representatives of the Soviet Union.)	2	1	0	1	2	1	1
Subtotal		2	1	0	1	2	1	1
Austria	Austria Wien	4	2	2	0	10	6	4
Austria	Rapid Wien	4	3	0	1	7	1	6
Austria	Red Bull Salzburg	4	3	1	0	17	5	12
Subtotal		12	8	3	1	34	12	22
Belarus	BATE Borisov	2	1	0	1	5	4	1
Subtotal		2	1	0	1	5	4	1
Belgium	Anderlecht	12	7	3	2	25	14	11
Belgium	Club Brugge	3	2	1	0	6	1	5
Belgium	Standard Liège	2	2	0	0	5	1	4
Belgium	Union Saint-Gilloise	1	1	0	0	2	0	2
Subtotal		18	12	4	2	38	16	22
Brazil	Cruzeiro	2	1	1	0	2	0	2
Brazil	Flamengo	1	1	0	0	4	2	2
Subtotal		3	2	1	0	6	2	4
Bulgaria	CSKA Sofia	8	6	0	2	23	8	15
Bulgaria	Marek Dupnitsa	2	1	0	1	3	2	1
Bulgaria	Trakia Plovdiv	2	1	0	1	4	3	1
Subtotal		12	8	0	4	30	13	17
China	Guangzhou Evergrande	1	1	0	0	3	0	3
Subtotal		1	1	0	0	3	0	3
Croatia	Dinamo Zagreb (Note: Includes matches played as representatives of Yugoslavia.)	5	3	1	1	17	6	11
Subtotal		5	3	1	1	17	6	11
Cyprus	Anorthosis	2	2	0	0	11	0	11
Cyprus	APOEL	2	2	0	0	7	2	5
Cyprus	Omonia	2	2	0	0	13	0	13
Cyprus	Pafos	1	1	0	0	5	1	4
Subtotal		7	7	0	0	36	3	33
Czech Republic	Sparta Prague	2	1	1	0	1	0	1
Czech Republic	Viktoria Plzeň (Note: Includes matches played as representatives of Czechoslovakia.)	6	6	0	0	22	3	19
Czech Republic	Baník Ostrava (Note: All matches played as representatives of Czechoslovakia.)	4	3	0	1	12	4	8
Czech Republic	Bohemians Prague	2	1	1	0	4	2	2
Subtotal		14	11	2	1	39	9	30
Denmark	AGF	2	2	0	0	5	2	3
Denmark	B 1903	2	1	0	1	3	6	−3
Denmark	Brøndby	2	1	0	1	3	2	1
Denmark	Copenhagen	2	1	1	0	2	1	1
Denmark	Køge	2	2	0	0	7	1	6
Subtotal		10	7	1	2	20	12	8
Egypt	Al Ahly	1	1	0	0	2	0	2
Subtotal		1	1	0	0	2	0	2
England	Arsenal	16	8	4	4	33	20	13
England	Aston Villa	2	0	0	2	0	2	−2
England	Bolton Wanderers	1	0	1	0	2	2	0
England	Chelsea	7	4	2	1	18	11	+7
England	Coventry City	2	1	0	1	7	3	4
England	Everton	2	0	1	1	1	3	−2
England	Leeds United	1	1	0	0	2	0	2
England	Liverpool	9	1	5	3	8	12	−4
England	Manchester City	8	3	1	4	11	13	−2
England	Manchester United	13	6	5	2	21	16	5
England	Norwich City	2	0	1	1	2	3	−1
England	Nottingham Forest	2	2	0	0	7	2	5
England	Tottenham Hotspur	6	4	1	1	16	7	9
Subtotal		71	30	21	20	128	94	34
France	Bordeaux	4	2	0	2	6	5	1
France	Lens	2	0	2	0	4	4	0
France	Lille	2	2	0	0	7	1	6
France	Lyon	9	5	2	2	14	9	5
France	Marseille	2	2	0	0	4	0	4
France	Nantes	2	2	0	0	3	1	2
France	Paris Saint-Germain	18	9	1	8	26	24	2
France	Saint-Étienne	5	3	1	1	5	3	2
Subtotal		44	25	6	13	69	47	22
Germany	Bayer Leverkusen	2	2	0	0	5	0	5
Germany	Borussia Dortmund	3	1	1	1	2	2	0
Germany	Dynamo Dresden (Note: All matches played as representatives of East Germany.)	2	1	1	0	7	6	1
Germany	Eintracht Frankfurt (Note: All matches played as representatives of West Germany.)	4	1	0	3	4	11	−7
Germany	1. FC Kaiserslautern (Note: Includes matches played as representatives of West Germany.)	4	3	0	1	10	2	8
Germany	1. FC Magdeburg	2	2	0	0	5	3	2
Subtotal		17	10	2	5	33	24	9
Greece	AEK Athens	2	2	0	0	4	0	4
Greece	Aris	1	1	0	0	6	0	6
Greece	Olympiacos	6	6	0	0	19	4	15
Greece	Panathinaikos	2	2	0	0	7	1	6
Greece	PAOK	2	0	2	0	0	0	0
Subtotal		13	11	2	0	36	5	31
Hungary	Újpest	2	1	1	0	4	1	3
Subtotal		2	1	1	0	4	1	3
Israel	Maccabi Haifa	2	2	0	0	4	0	4
Israel	Maccabi Tel Aviv	2	2	0	0	6	1	5
Subtotal		4	4	0	0	10	1	9
Italy	Atalanta	2	2	0	0	10	2	8
Italy	Fiorentina	4	2	1	1	8	5	3
Italy	Internazionale	11	5	2	4	16	13	3
Italy	Juventus	10	5	2	3	17	10	7
Italy	Lazio	4	3	0	1	9	3	6
Italy	Milan	10	1	3	6	8	17	−9
Italy	Napoli	4	1	2	1	6	7	−1
Italy	Roma	6	5	0	1	17	5	12
Subtotal		51	24	20	17	91	62	29
Luxembourg	Jeunesse Esch	2	2	0	0	8	1	7
Subtotal		2	2	0	0	8	1	7
Mexico	Tigres UANL	1	1	0	0	1	0	1
Subtotal		1	1	0	0	1	0	1
Morocco	Raja Casablanca	1	1	0	0	2	0	2
Subtotal		1	1	0	0	2	0	2
Netherlands	Ajax	10	3	4	3	20	19	1
Netherlands	Feyenoord	3	1	1	1	5	6	−1
Netherlands	PSV Eindhoven	9	7	1	1	16	7	9
Netherlands	Sparta Rotterdam	2	2	0	0	5	2	3
Netherlands	Twente	2	2	0	0	7	3	4
Subtotal		26	15	6	5	53	37	16
New Zealand	Auckland City	1	1	0	0	10	0	10
Subtotal		1	1	0	0	10	0	10
Norway	Bodø/Glimt	1	1	0	0	5	0	5
Norway	Mjøndalen	2	2	0	0	12	0	12
Norway	Moss	2	2	0	0	6	2	4
Norway	Rosenborg	4	2	2	0	7	4	3
Norway	Viking	1	0	1	0	3	3	0
Subtotal		10	7	3	0	33	9	24
Poland	Górnik Zabrze	2	2	0	0	6	2	4
Poland	Legia Warsaw	2	2	0	0	10	4	6
Subtotal		4	4	0	0	16	6	10
Portugal	Belenenses	2	2	0	0	3	0	3
Portugal	Benfica	14	10	3	1	36	10	26
Portugal	Boavista	2	1	1	0	1	0	1
Portugal	Braga	1	0	1	0	1	1	0
Portugal	Porto	7	3	2	2	14	9	5
Portugal	Sporting CP	5	4	1	0	16	2	14
Portugal	Vitória de Setúbal	2	1	1	0	7	3	4
Subtotal		33	21	9	3	68	25	43
Republic of Ireland	Cork City	2	1	1	0	3	1	2
Republic of Ireland	Drumcondra	2	1	0	1	6	1	5
Republic of Ireland	Shamrock Rovers	2	1	1	0	4	3	1
Subtotal		6	3	2	1	13	5	8
Romania	CFR Cluj	2	2	0	0	7	2	5
Romania	Steaua București	4	2	2	0	5	1	4
Romania	Universitatea Craiova	2	1	1	0	3	1	2
Subtotal		8	5	3	0	15	4	11
Russia	CSKA Moscow	4	4	0	0	10	1	9
Russia	Lokomotiv Moscow	4	3	0	1	9	2	7
Russia	Rostov	2	1	0	1	7	3	4
Russia	Spartak Moscow	8	5	3	0	21	7	14
Russia	Zenit Saint Petersburg	2	0	1	1	1	5	−4
Russia	Torpedo Moscow	2	0	2	0	1	1	0
Subtotal		22	13	6	3	49	19	30
Scotland	Aberdeen	4	1	2	1	9	6	3
Scotland	Celtic	6	4	2	0	10	4	6
Scotland	Heart of Midlothian	2	1	0	1	2	1	1
Scotland	Raith Rovers	2	2	0	0	4	1	3
Scotland	Rangers	9	4	4	1	9	6	3
Subtotal		23	12	8	3	34	18	16
Serbia	Obilic (Note: All matches played as representatives of FR Yugoslavia (Serbia and Montenegro).)	2	1	1	0	5	1	4
Serbia	Partizan	2	2	0	0	6	1	5
Serbia	Red Star Belgrade	7	4	1	2	19	9	10
Subtotal		11	7	2	2	30	11	19
Slovakia	DAC	2	2	0	0	5	1	4
Slovakia	Slovan Bratislava	1	1	0	0	3	1	2
Slovakia	Tatran Presov	2	1	1	0	4	3	1
Subtotal		5	4	1	0	12	5	7
Spain	Atlético Madrid	9	5	2	2	15	5	10
Spain	Barcelona	16	11	2	3	38	20	18
Spain	Deportivo La Coruña	2	0	0	2	3	5	−2
Spain	Getafe	2	0	2	0	4	4	0
Spain	Real Madrid	30	13	4	13	48	49	−1
Spain	Sevilla	3	2	1	0	4	2	2
Spain	Valencia	9	3	4	2	9	9	0
Spain	Villarreal	4	2	1	1	6	3	3
Subtotal		75	36	16	23	127	97	30
Sweden	Helsingborg	2	1	1	0	3	1	2
Sweden	IFK Göteborg	4	1	2	1	5	4	1
Sweden	Malmö FF	2	1	0	1	2	1	1
Sweden	Åtvidaberg	2	1	0	1	4	4	0
Sweden	Öster	2	2	0	0	6	0	6
Subtotal		12	6	3	3	20	10	10
Switzerland	Basel	4	3	0	1	12	1	11
Switzerland	Basel XI	1	1	0	0	3	0	3
Switzerland	Neuchâtel Xamax	2	1	0	1	3	2	1
Switzerland	Zürich	2	2	0	0	3	0	3
Subtotal		9	7	0	2	21	3	18
Turkey	Beşiktaş	4	4	0	0	12	1	11
Turkey	Galatasaray	4	3	1	0	12	3	9
Subtotal		8	7	1	0	24	4	20
Ukraine	Dynamo Kyiv (Note: Includes matches played as representatives of the Soviet Union.)	12	7	1	4	19	13	6
Ukraine	Shakhtar Donetsk	3	2	1	0	12	1	11
Subtotal		15	9	2	4	31	14	17
Country	Club	Pld	W	D	L	GF	GA	GD
Total		565	332	116	117	1,190	582	608

== See also ==
- German football clubs in European competitions
- History of the European Cup and UEFA Champions League
- List of FC Bayern Munich seasons
- List of FC Bayern Munich records and statistics
