= Jan Ruiter =

Dutch footballer (born 1946)

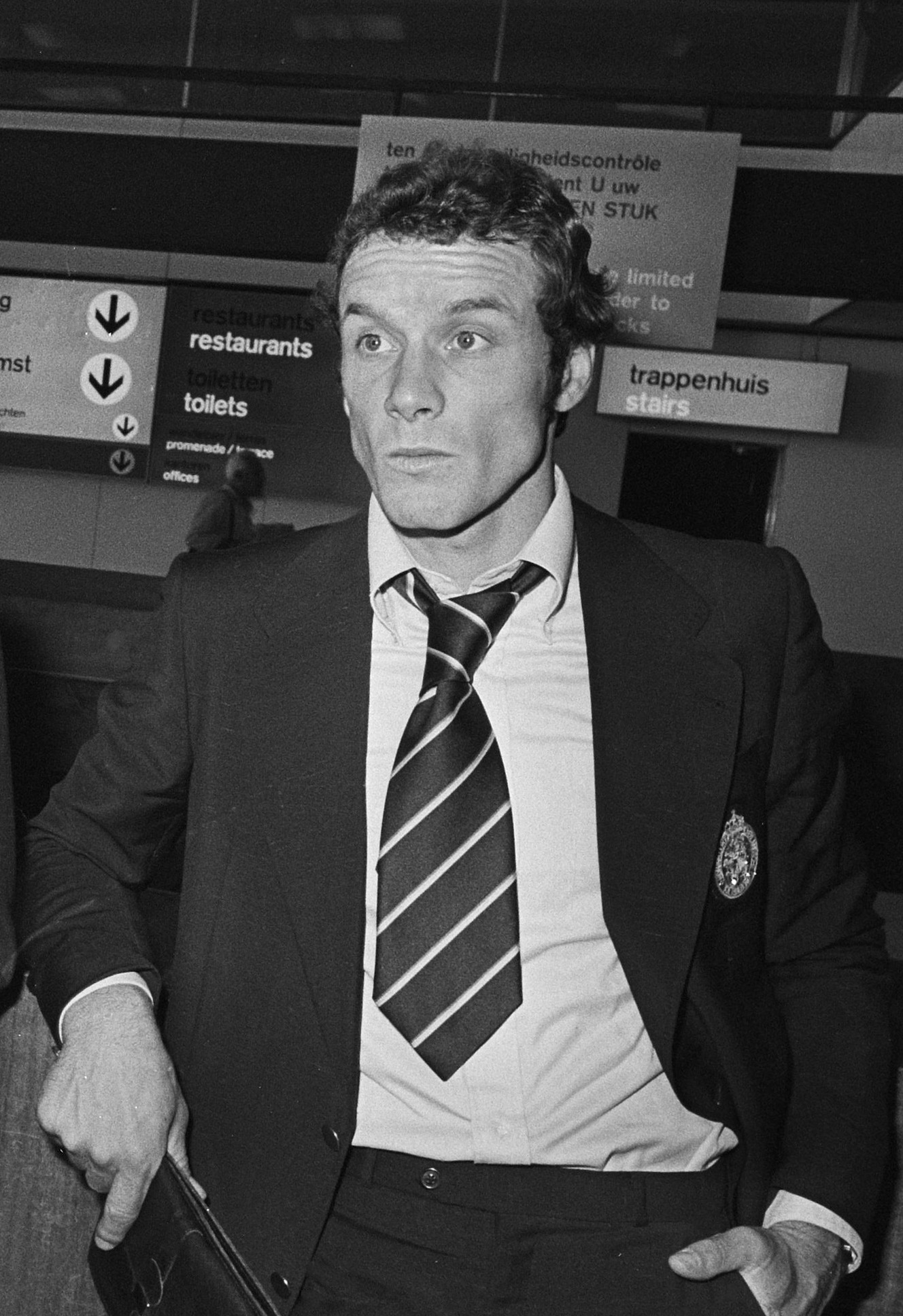
- Ruiter in 1976

Personal information
- Date of birth: 24 November 1946 (age 79)
- Place of birth: Enkhuizen, Netherlands
- Position: Goalkeeper

Senior career*
| Years | Team | Apps | (Gls) |
| 1967–1971 | FC Volendam | | |
| 1971–1977 | Anderlecht | | |
| 1977–1983 | R.W.D. Molenbeek | | |
| 1983–1984 | Beerschot | | |
| 1984–1985 | Royal Antwerp | 22 | (0) |

International career
| 1976 | Netherlands | 1 | (0) |

Managerial career
- 1989: Berchem
Medal record
Representing Netherlands
UEFA European Championship
| Third place | 1976 Yugoslavia |
- * Club domestic league appearances and goals

Jan Ruiter (Dutch pronunciation: [jɑn ˈrœytər]; born 24 November 1946) is a Dutch former professional footballer who played as a goalkeeper.

== Career ==
Ruiter was born in Enkhuizen, North Holland. During his club career he played for FC Volendam, R.S.C. Anderlecht, R.W.D. Molenbeek, K. Beerschot V.A.C. and Royal Antwerp FC. He earned one cap for the Netherlands national team, and was included in their squad for the 1976 UEFA European Football Championship. While at Anderlecht he played as they won the 1976 European Cup Winners' Cup Final.

He later managed Berchem.

== Honours ==
=== Player ===
FC Volendam

- Eerste Divisie: 1969–70

Anderlecht

- Belgian First Division: 1971–72, 1973–74
- Belgian Cup: 1971–72, 1972–73, 1974–75, 1975–76
- Belgian League Cup: 1973, 1974
- European Cup Winners' Cup: 1975–76; runner-up 1976–77
- European Super Cup: 1976
- Amsterdam Tournament: 1976
- Jules Pappaert Cup: 1977
- Belgian Sports Merit Award: 1978
