= 1976 European Super Cup =

- Second leg matchday program
| Bayern Munich | Anderlecht |
| (West Germany) | (Belgium) |
| 3 | 5 |
- on aggregate

First leg
| Bayern Munich | Anderlecht |
| 2 | 1 |
- Date: 17 August 1976
- Venue: Olympiastadion, Munich
- Referee: Ken Burns (England)
- Attendance: 41,000

Second leg
| Anderlecht | Bayern Munich |
| 4 | 1 |
- Date: 30 August 1976
- Venue: Emile Verséstadion, Brussels
- Referee: Paul Schiller (Austria)
- Attendance: 35,000

The 1976 European Super Cup was played between 1975–76 European Cup Winners' Cup winners Anderlecht of Belgium and 1975–76 European Cup winners Bayern Munich of West Germany, with Anderlecht winning 5–3 on aggregate.

It was difficult to pick a clear favourite, although in retrospect Bayern Munich (who had won three European cups in a row) were past their prime, while Anderlecht were younger and hungrier.

At the Olympiastadion, in front of 41,000 fans, Bayern went behind due to a goal by Arie Haan, scored in the 16th minute, who was good at taking advantage of a shot that hit the post of the German goal. However, Bayern came back thanks to a nice brace by Gerd Müller, with goals in the 58th and 88th minutes.

At the Stade Émile Versé in Anderlecht, Bayern's game got off to a bad start from the middle of the first half. The Bavarians quickly fell behind in the 20th minute, following a fine goal by Rob Rensenbrink, who headed in a pass from about forty meters away. The goal by the Dutchman from Anderlecht was followed five minutes later by a second goal by François Van der Elst, who was able to take advantage of an uncertain exit by Sepp Maier. Less than a quarter of an hour into the second half, one of the other Dutch players on the Belgian team, Arie Haan, scored the third goal. His run through three Germans in the Bayern area was followed by a powerful right-footed shot that went past Maier to his left. The Germans managed to close the gap thanks to a goal of Gerd Müller in the 63rd minute. But it was too late to turn the tide of the game, and with less than ten minutes left in regulation time, Rensenbrink scored his second goal of the match, making the score 4–1 in favor of the home team.

And so Anderlecht won the Super Cup for the first time (two years later they would do it again). Bayern, on the other hand, lost the chance to win the trophy for the second time in a row (defeated by Dynamo Kiev in 1975).

== First leg ==
17 August 1976

| Bayern Munich (West Germany) | 2–1 | (Belgium) Anderlecht |
|---|---|---|
| Müller 58', 88' | Report | Haan 16' |

Olympiastadion, Munich
Attendance: 41,000
Referee: Ken Burns (England)

| Bayern Munich | Anderlecht |

| GK | 1 | (West Germany) Sepp Maier |
| DF | | (West Germany) Jupp Kapellmann |
| DF | | (West Germany) Udo Horsmann |
| DF | | (West Germany) Hans-Georg Schwarzenbeck |
| MF | | (West Germany) Franz Beckenbauer (c) |
| MF | | (West Germany) Rainer Künkel |
| MF | | (West Germany) Bernd Dürnberger |
| MF | | (West Germany) Karl-Heinz Rummenigge |
| FW | | (West Germany) Gerd Müller |
| FW | | (West Germany) Uli Hoeneß |
| MF | | (Sweden) Conny Torstensson |
Manager:
(West Germany) Dettmar Cramer

| GK | 1 | (Netherlands) Jan Ruiter |
| DF | 2 | (Belgium) Gilbert Van Binst (c) |
| DF | 3 | (Belgium) Hugo Broos |
| DF | 4 | (Belgium) Erwin Vandendaele |
| MF | 5 | (Belgium) Jean Dockx | Substituted off |
| DF | 6 | (Netherlands) Arie Haan |
| MF | 7 | (Belgium) François Van der Elst |
| MF | 8 | (Belgium) Franky Vercauteren |
| MF | 9 | (Netherlands) Peter Ressel |
| FW | 10 | (Belgium) Ludo Coeck |
| FW | 11 | (Netherlands) Rob Rensenbrink |
Substitutes:
| DF | | (Belgium) Michel De Groote | Substituted on |
Manager:
(Belgium) Raymond Goethals

== Second leg ==
30 August 1976

| Anderlecht (Belgium) | 4–1 | (West Germany) Bayern Munich |
|---|---|---|
| Rensenbrink 20', 82'; Van der Elst 25'; Haan 59' | Report | Müller 63' |

Parc Astrid, Brussels
Attendance: 35,000
Referee: Paul Schiller (Austria)

| Anderlecht | Bayern Munich |

| GK | 1 | (Netherlands) Jan Ruiter |
| MF | 2 | (Belgium) François Van der Elst |
| DF | 3 | (Belgium) Hugo Broos |
| DF | 4 | (Belgium) Erwin Vandendaele (c) |
| MF | 5 | (Belgium) Jean Dockx | Substituted off |
| DF | 6 | (Netherlands) Arie Haan |
| MF | 7 | (Belgium) Franky Vercauteren |
| MF | 8 | (Netherlands) Peter Ressel |
| FW | 9 | (England) Duncan McKenzie |
| FW | 10 | (Belgium) Ludo Coeck |
| FW | 11 | (Netherlands) Rob Rensenbrink |
Substitutes:
| DF | | (Belgium) Michel De Groote | Substituted on |
Manager:
(Belgium) Raymond Goethals

| GK | (West Germany) Sepp Maier |
| DF | (Sweden) Björn Andersson |
| DF | (West Germany) Udo Horsmann |
| DF | (West Germany) Hans-Georg Schwarzenbeck |
| MF | (West Germany) Franz Beckenbauer (c) |
| MF | (West Germany) Jupp Kapellmann |
| MF | (West Germany) Bernd Dürnberger |
| MF | (West Germany) Karl-Heinz Rummenigge |
| FW | (West Germany) Gerd Müller |
| FW | (West Germany) Uli Hoeneß | Substituted off |
| MF | (Sweden) Conny Torstensson |
Substitutes:
| MF | (West Germany) Rainer Künkel | Substituted on |
Manager:
(West Germany) Dettmar Cramer

== See also ==
- 1976–77 European Cup
- 1976–77 European Cup Winners' Cup
- 1976–77 FC Bayern Munich season
- FC Bayern Munich in international football
- R.S.C. Anderlecht in European football
