= 1976–77 FC Bayern Munich season =

12th season of Bayern Munich in the Bundesliga

Bayern Munich
1976–77 season
- Chairman: Wilhelm Neudecker
- Manager: Dettmar Cramer
- Stadium: Olympiastadion
- Bundesliga: 7th
- DFB-Pokal: Quarter-finals
- European Cup: Quarter-finals
- European Super Cup: Runners-up
- Intercontinental Cup: Winners
- Top goalscorer: League: Gerd Müller (28); All: Gerd Müller (48)
Home colours	Away colours

The 1976–77 FC Bayern Munich season was the club's 12th season in Bundesliga.

== Review and events ==
The club won the 1976 Intercontinental Cup against Cruzeiro, the winner of 1976 Copa Libertadores. In the 1976–77 European Cup the three-time defending champion Bayern was defeated in the Quarterfinals by FC Dynamo Kyiv. Furthermore, Bayern was unsuccessful in domestic competitions and was also defeated in the 1976 European Super Cup by R.S.C. Anderlecht.

== Match results ==
=== Legend ===
Win Draw Loss

=== Bundesliga ===
14 August 1976 1	Bayern Munich	2–1	Fortuna Düsseldorf	Munich
15:30 CET	Dürnberger 70'; Müller 74'	Report	Bommer 3'; Kriegler (yellow card)	Stadium: Olympic Stadium; Attendance: 36,000; Referee: Hermann Schröder

21 August 1976 2	MSV Duisburg	5–2	Bayern Munich	Duisburg
15:30 CET	Seliger 33'; Thies 21'; Bregman 8'; Dietz 63'; Schneider 87'	Report	Torstensson 2'; Rummenigge 69'; Müller (yellow card)	Stadium: Wedaustadion; Attendance: 33,000; Referee: Eckhard Jensen

27 August 1976 3	Bayern Munich	2–2	Eintracht Braunschweig	Munich
15:30 CET	Hoeneß 60'; Dürnberger 62'	Report	Hollmann 52'; Frank 77'; Handschuh (yellow card)	Stadium: Olympic Stadium; Attendance: 35,000; Referee: Gerd Hennig

4 September 1976 4	Hertha BSC	1–1	Bayern Munich	Berlin
15:30 CET	Szymanek 86' (pen.); Kliemann (yellow card)	Report	Hoeneß 33'; Maier (yellow card); Kapellmann (yellow card)	Stadium: Olympic Stadium; Attendance: 65,000; Referee: Walter Eschweiler

10 September 1976 5	Bayern Munich	9–0	Tennis Borussia Berlin	Munich
20:00 CET	Kapellmann 23'; Rummenigge 30', 77', 89'; Müller 35', 39', 48', 57', 85'; Schwarzenbeck (yellow card)	Report		Stadium: Olympic Stadium; Attendance: 15,000; Referee: Heinz Quindeau

18 September 1976 6	VfL Bochum	5–6	Bayern Munich	Bochum
15:30 CET	Ellbracht 24', 43'; Kaczor 39', 80'; Pochstein 53'	Report	Rummenigge 55'; Schwarzenbeck 57'; Müller 63', 74' (pen.); Hoeneß 75', 89'	Stadium: Stadion an der Castroper Straße; Attendance: 17,000; Referee: Walter Horstmann

25 September 1976 7	Bayern Munich	4–1	1. FC Köln	Munich
15:30 CET	Rummenigge 9'; Hoeneß 41', 78'; Dürnberger 79'; Torstensson (yellow card)	Report	Overath 60'	Stadium: Olympic Stadium; Attendance: 77,850; Referee: Ferdinand Biwersi

2 October 1976 8	Borussia Dortmund	3–3	Bayern Munich	Dortmund
15:30 CET	Vöge 60'; Erwin Kostedde 80'; Hartl 89'; Schwarze (yellow card); Meyer (yellow card)	Report	Rummenigge 44', 77'; Müller 54'; Andersson (yellow card)	Stadium: Westfalenstadion; Attendance: 53,800; Referee: Volker Roth

9 October 1976 9	Bayern Munich	0–7	Schalke 04	Munich
15:30 CET		Report	Fischer 11', 46', 67', 82'; Kremers 44'; Dubski 64'; Abramczik 74'	Stadium: Olympic Stadium; Attendance: 50,000; Referee: Günter Linn

23 October 1976 10	Werder Bremen	2–3	Bayern Munich	Bremen
15:30 CET	Weist 36'; Röber 88'	Report	Müller 19'; Rummenigge 68'; Geils 73' (o.g.)	Stadium: Weserstadion; Attendance: 38,000; Referee: Karl-Heinz Fork

30 October 1976 11	Bayern Munich	6–2	Hamburger SV	Munich
15:30 CET	Müller 35', 61', 82', 89' (penalty missed) 38'; Torstensson 49'; Kapellmann 73'	Report	Reimann 43' (yellow card); Björnmose 54'	Stadium: Olympic Stadium; Attendance: 35,000; Referee: Paul Kindervater

6 November 1976 12	1. FC Kaiserslautern	1–1	Bayern Munich	Kaiserslautern
15:30 CET	Pirrung 51'; Meier (yellow card); Riedl (yellow card)	Report	Müller 36'; Kapellmann (yellow card); Schwarzenbeck (yellow card)	Stadium: Betzenbergstadion; Attendance: 32,000; Referee: Rainer Waltert

13 November 1976 13	Bayern Munich	5–1	1. FC Saarbrücken	Munich
15:30 CET	Müller 31', 89' (pen.); Dürnberger 50'; Beckenbauer 66'; Hoeneß 77'	Report	Cremer 22' (pen.)	Stadium: Olympic Stadium; Attendance: 21,000; Referee: Eckhard Jensen

20 November 1976 14	Rot-Weiß Essen	1–4	Bayern Munich	Essen
15:30 CET	Bast 79'	Report	Müller 21', 76'; Beckenbauer 50'; Hoeneß 78'	Stadium: Georg-Melches-Stadion; Attendance: 15,000; Referee: Hermann Schröder

27 November 1976 15	Karlsruher SC	1–2	Bayern Munich	Karlsruhe
15:30 CET	Struth 60' (pen.)	Report	Horsmann 41' (yellow card); Rummenigge 50'	Stadium: Wildparkstadion; Attendance: 46,000; Referee: Wolf-Dieter Ahlenfelder

4 December 1976 16	Bayern Munich	0–3	Eintracht Frankfurt	Munich
15:30 CET		Report	Nickel 30'; Hölzenbein 74' (pen.), 77'	Stadium: Olympic Stadium; Attendance: 25,000; Referee: Walter Horstmann

12 November 1976 17	Borussia Mönchengladbach	1–0	Bayern Munich	Mönchengladbach
15:30 CET	Simonsen 52'	Report	Dürnberger (yellow card)	Stadium: Bökelbergstadion; Attendance: 34,500; Referee: Volker Roth

15 January 1977 18	Fortuna Düsseldorf	0–0	Bayern Munich	Düsseldorf
15:30 CET		Report	Kapellmann (yellow card); Schenk (yellow card)	Stadium: Rheinstadion; Attendance: 38,000; Referee: Jan Redelfs

22 January 1977 19	Bayern Munich	2–2	MSV Duisburg	Munich
15:30 CET	Müller 33'; Torstensson 58'	Report	Worm 6', 9'	Stadium: Olympic Stadium; Attendance: 18,000; Referee: Ferdinand Biwersi

29 January 1977 20	Eintracht Braunschweig	1–0	Bayern Munich	Braunschweig
15:30 CET	Handschuh 49'	Report	Torstensson (yellow card)	Stadium: Eintracht-Stadion; Attendance: 30,000; Referee: Wilfried Hilker

5 February 1977 21	Bayern Munich	1–0	Hertha BSC	Munich
15:30 CET	Gruber 83'	Report	Nigbur (yellow card); Grau (yellow card)	Stadium: Olympic Stadium; Attendance: 18,000; Referee: Werner Burgers

12 February 1977 22	Tennis Borussia Berlin	3–1	Bayern Munich	Berlin
15:30 CET	Wendt 43', 76'; Baake 52'	Report	Kirschner 83'	Stadium: Olympic Stadium; Attendance: 40,000; Referee: Rainer Waltert

26 February 1977 23	Bayern Munich	1–1	VfL Bochum	Munich
15:30 CET	Künkel 26'	Report	Kaczor 13'	Stadium: Olympic Stadium; Attendance: 16,000; Referee: Walter Niemann

5 March 1977 24	1. FC Köln	3–0	Bayern Munich	Cologne
15:30 CET	van Gool 8', 17'; Beckenbauer 57' (o.g.)	Report		Stadium: Müngersdorfer Stadion; Attendance: 60,000; Referee: Walter Engel

12 March 1977 25	Bayern Munich	1–2	Borussia Dortmund	Munich
15:30 CET	Künkel 20'; Gruber (yellow card)	Report	Erwin Kostedde 29'; Huber 89'; Votava (yellow card)	Stadium: Olympic Stadium; Attendance: 27,000; Referee: Eckhard Jensen

19 March 1977 26	Schalke 04	0–0	Bayern Munich	Gelsenkirchen
15:30 CET		Report	Kirschner (yellow card); Torstensson (yellow card); Kapellmann (yellow card)	Stadium: Parkstadion; Attendance: 70,200; Referee: Theo Antz

26 March 1977 27	Bayern Munich	1–0	Werder Bremen	Munich
15:30 CET	Roth 66'; Beckenbauer (penalty missed) 83'	Report		Stadium: Olympic Stadium; Attendance: 24,000; Referee: Gerd Hennig

1 April 1977 28	Hamburger SV	5–0	Bayern Munich	Hamburg
15:30 CET	Zaczyk 19'; Reimann 21'; Memering 55'; Volkert 67' (pen.); Steffenhagen 73'	Report	Gruber (yellow card)	Stadium: Volksparkstadion; Attendance: 51,000; Referee: Werner Burgers

7 April 1977 29	Bayern Munich	3–0	1. FC Kaiserslautern	Munich
20:00 CET	Müller 1'; Rummenigge 9'; Önal 57'	Report	Riedl (yellow card)	Stadium: Olympic Stadium; Attendance: 19,000; Referee: Volker Roth

16 April 1977 30	1. FC Saarbrücken	6–1	Bayern Munich	Saarbrücken
15:30 CET	Stegmayer 21', 40', 60', 75'; Denz 80'; Schuster 88'	Report	Müller 70'	Stadium: Ludwigsparkstadion; Attendance: 39,000; Referee: Wolf-Dieter Ahlenfelder

23 April 1977 31	Bayern Munich	5–1	Rot-Weiß Essen	Munich
15:30 CET	Beckenbauer 4'; Müller 55', 59', 84' (pen.), 86'; Rummenigge (yellow card)	Report	Hrubesch 64'; Bast (yellow card); Mill (yellow card)	Stadium: Olympic Stadium; Attendance: 15,000; Referee: Heinz Quindeau

7 May 1977 32	Bayern Munich	5–0	Karlsruher SC	Munich
15:30 CET	Torstensson 37'; Kapellmann 42', 88' (yellow card); Müller 67'; Hoeneß 89'	Report		Stadium: Olympic Stadium; Attendance: 28,000; Referee: Karl-Heinz Fork

14 May 1977 33	Eintracht Frankfurt	2–1	Bayern Munich	Frankfurt
15:30 CET	Nickel 34'; Hölzenbein 52'; Grabowski (yellow card)	Report	Rummenigge 32'; Gruber (yellow card); Müller (yellow card); Schwarzenbeck (yellow card)	Stadium: Waldstadion; Attendance: 60,000; Referee: Winfried Walz

21 May 1977 34	Bayern Munich	2–2	Borussia Mönchengladbach	Munich
15:30 CET	Müller 36'; Wittkamp 90' (o.g.)	Report	Heynckes 20'; Stielike 22'	Stadium: Olympic Stadium; Attendance: 77,500; Referee: Ferdinand Biwersi

=== DFB-Pokal ===
10 August 1976 1st Round	Hannover 96 II	0–10	Bayern Munich	Oberhausen
CET	Fidorra (yellow card)	Report	Dürnberger 9', 21', 71'; Müller 12', 64' (pen.); Schwarzenbeck 15'; Müssel 48' (o.g.); Kapellmann 53'; Hoeneß 59', 82'	Stadium: Niederrheinstadion; Attendance: 10,600; Referee: Gerhard Kaiser

16 October 1976 2nd Round	Bayern Munich	5–1	Hamburger SV	Munich
CET	Kapellmann 31'; Rummenigge 59'; Torstensson 71', 80'; Hoeneß 89'	Report	Hidien 41'	Stadium: Olympic Stadium; Attendance: 26,000; Referee: Walter Engel

18 December 1976 3rd Round	Bayern Munich	10–1	TV Unterboihingen	Munich
CET	Roth 9' (yellow card); Müller 12', 40' (pen.), 48', 56' (pen.), 79'; Seneca 25'; Hoeneß 72'; Weiß 83'; Rummenigge 84'	Report	Großmann 68'	Stadium: Olympic Stadium; Attendance: 8,500; Referee: Horst Stumpf

8 January 1977 Round of 16	Bayern Munich	5–3	FC Bayern Munich II	Munich
CET	Müller 18', 24', 27', 80'; Künkel 45'	Report	Reisinger 13'; Kirschner 29'; Önal 76'; Gruber (yellow card)	Stadium: Olympic Stadium; Attendance: 6,500; Referee: Herbert Möckel

19 February 1977 Quarter-finals	Hertha BSC	4–2 (a.e.t.)	Bayern Munich	Berlin
CET	Granitza 51' (pen.), 100'; Horr 107'; Gersdorff 116' (yellow card)	Report	Kapellmann 6'; Weiß 95'; Gruber (yellow card)	Stadium: Olympic Stadium; Attendance: 42,000; Referee: Paul Kindervater

=== European Cup ===
14 September 1976 1st Round	Køge BK (Denmark)	0–5	(West Germany) Bayern Munich	Køge
19:00 CET		Report	Torstensson 3', 23'; Müller 19', 33'; Dürnberger 63'	Stadium: Køge Stadion; Attendance: 38,000; Referee: Albert Victor (Luxembourg)

29 September 1976 1st Round	Bayern Munich (West Germany)	2–1 (7–1 agg.)	(Denmark) Køge BK	Munich
20:00 CET	Beckenbauer 7'; Torstensson 74'	Report	Poulsen 34'	Stadium: Olympic Stadium; Attendance: 25,000; Referee: Alojzy Jarguz (Poland)

20 October 1976 Round of 16	Baník Ostrava (Czechoslovakia)	2–1	(West Germany) Bayern Munich	Ostrava
17:00 CET	Lorenc 11'; Lička 27'	Report	Müller 53'	Stadium: Bazaly; Attendance: 31,000; Referee: Robert Helies (France)

3 November 1976 Round of 16	Bayern Munich (West Germany)	5–0 (6–2 agg.)	(Czechoslovakia) Baník Ostrava	Munich
20:00 CET	Müller 15', 49' (yellow card) 82'; Rummenigge 37'; Kapellmann 71'; Torstensson 74'; Horsmann (yellow card) 70'	Report		Stadium: Olympic Stadium; Attendance: 60,000; Referee: Dušan Maksimovíc (Serbia)

2 March 1977 Quarter-finals	Bayern Munich (West Germany)	1–0	(Soviet Union) Dynamo Kyiv	Munich
20:00 CET	Künkel 43'	Report		Stadium: Olympic Stadium; Attendance: 75,000; Referee: Antonio José Garrido Da Silva (Portugal)

16 March 1977 Quarter-finals	Dynamo Kyiv (Soviet Union)	2–0 (2–1 agg.)	(West Germany) Bayern Munich	Kiev
18:00 CET	Buryak 83' (pen.); Slobodyan 88'	Report	Gruber (yellow card) 61'	Stadium: Republican Stadium; Attendance: 110,000; Referee: Erich Linemayr (Austria)

=== European Super Cup ===
17 August 1976 Final	Bayern Munich (West Germany)	2–1	(Belgium) Anderlecht	Munich
20:00 CET	Müller 58', 88'	Report	Haan 16'	Stadium: Olympiastadion; Attendance: 41,000; Referee: Kenneth Burns (England)

30 August 1976 Final	Anderlecht (Belgium)	4–1 (5–3 agg.)	(West Germany) Bayern Munich	Brussels
20:00 CET	Rensenbrink 20', 82' (yellow card); Van der Elst 25'; Haan 59'	Report	Müller 63'	Stadium: Constant Vanden Stock Stadium; Attendance: 31,000; Referee: Paul Schiller (Austria)

=== Intercontinental Cup ===
23 November 1976 Final	Bayern Munich (West Germany)	2–0	(Brazil) Cruzeiro	Munich
20:00 CET	Müller 80'; Kappellmann 82'	Report		Stadium: Olympiastadion; Attendance: 22,000; Referee: Luis Pestarino (Argentina)

21 December 1976 Final	Cruzeiro (Brazil)	0–0 (0–2 agg.)	(West Germany) Bayern Munich	Belo Horizonte
20:00 CET		Report		Stadium: Mineirão; Attendance: 123,715; Referee: Patrick Patridge (England)
