= 1975–76 FC Bayern Munich season =

11th season of Bayern Munich in the Bundesliga

Bayern Munich
1975–76 season
- Chairman: Wilhelm Neudecker
- Manager: Dettmar Cramer
- Stadium: Olympiastadion
- Bundesliga: 3rd
- DFB-Pokal: Semi-finals
- European Cup: Winners
- European Super Cup: Runners-up
- Intercontinental Cup: Withdrew
- Top goalscorer: League: Gerd Müller (23); All: Gerd Müller (35)
| Home colours | Away colours | Third colours |

The 1975–76 FC Bayern Munich season was the club's 11th season in Bundesliga.

== Review and events ==
In Glasgow, the club defeated AS Saint-Étienne to win the 1976 European Cup Final, with Roth scoring the winning goal. Bayern became the third club to win the trophy in three consecutive years. However, Bayern was unsuccessful in domestic competitions and was also defeated in the 1975 European Super Cup by FC Dynamo Kyiv.

== Squad ==
Note: Flags indicate national team as defined under FIFA eligibility rules; some limited exceptions apply. Players may hold more than one non-FIFA nationality.

| No. | Pos. | Nation | Player |
|---|---|---|---|
| — | GK | GER | Sepp Maier |
| — | GK | GER | Hugo Robl |
| — | DF | GER | Franz Beckenbauer |
| — | DF | GER | Udo Horsmann |
| — | DF | GER | Hans-Georg Schwarzenbeck |
| — | DF | GER | Jupp Kapellmann |
| — | DF | DEN | Johnny Hansen |
| — | DF | SWE | Björn Andersson |
| — | DF | GER | Bernd Förster |
| — | DF | GER | Günther Weiß |
| — | DF | GER | Richard Mamajewski |
| — | MF | GER | Bernd Dürnberger |
| — | MF | GER | Sepp Weiß |

| No. | Pos. | Nation | Player |
|---|---|---|---|
| — | MF | GER | Franz Roth |
| — | MF | GER | Rainer Zobel |
| — | MF | GER | Karl-Heinz Rummenigge |
| — | MF | SWE | Conny Torstensson |
| — | MF | GER | Ludwig Schuster |
| — | MF | GER | Franz Michelberger |
| — | MF | DEN | Kjeld Seneca |
| — | FW | GER | Gerd Müller |
| — | FW | GER | Uli Hoeneß |
| — | FW | GER | Klaus Wunder |
| — | FW | GER | Jürgen Marek |
| — | FW | GER | Rainer Künkel |
| — | FW | GER | Edmund Kaczor |

== Match results ==
=== Legend ===
Win Draw Loss

=== Bundesliga ===
| 9 August 1975 1 | Bayern Munich | 1–1 | Eintracht Braunschweig | Munich |
| 15:30 CET | Torstensson 83' | Report | Gersdorff 44' | Stadium: Olympic Stadium; Attendance: 37,000; Referee: Walter Eschweiler |

| 16 August 1975 2 | Karlsruher SC | 1–2 | Bayern Munich | Karlsruhe |
| 15:30 CET | Trenkel 53'; Fuchs (yellow card) | Report | Dürnberger 37'; Rummenigge 57' | Stadium: Wildparkstadion; Attendance: 46,000; Referee: Günter Linn |

| 22 August 1975 3 | Bayern Munich | 4–0 | Werder Bremen | Munich |
| 20:00 CET | Dürnberger 51'; Zobel 65'; Müller 71', 75' | Report | Assauer (penalty missed) 89' | Stadium: Olympic Stadium; Attendance: 27,000; Referee: Ferdinand Biwersi |

| 27 August 1975 4 | Bayer 05 Uerdingen | 2–1 | Bayern Munich | Krefeld |
| 20:00 CET | Köstner 68', 75'; Lübeke (yellow card) | Report | Müller 58'; Weiß (yellow card) | Stadium: Grotenburg-Stadion; Attendance: 23,000; Referee: Karl-Heinz Pickeri |

| 30 August 1975 5 | Bayern Munich | 5–0 | Fortuna Düsseldorf | Munich |
| 15:30 CET | Müller 20'; Zobel 41'; Rummenigge 53'; Beckenbauer 58', 83' | Report | | Stadium: Olympic Stadium; Attendance: 40,000; Referee: Walter Engel |

| 6 September 1975 6 | FC Schalke 04 | 2–2 | Bayern Munich | Gelsenkirchen |
| 15:30 CET | Sobieray 25'; Kremers 68'; Thiele (yellow card); Dubski (yellow card) | Report | Rummenigge 36' (yellow card); Zobel 86'; Kapellmann (yellow card) | Stadium: Parkstadion; Attendance: 72,000; Referee: Volker Roth |

| 13 September 1975 7 | Bayern Munich | 3–1 | Kickers Offenbach | Munich |
| 15:30 CET | Müller 42' (pen.), 68' (yellow card); Rummenigge 57'; Dürnberger (yellow card) | Report | Schmidradner 78'; Rausch (yellow card) | Stadium: Olympic Stadium; Attendance: 28,000; Referee: Rainer Waltert |

| 20 September 1975 8 | Borussia Mönchengladbach | 4–1 | Bayern Munich | Mönchengladbach |
| 15:30 CET | Stielike 15'; Simonsen 56'; Dietmar Danner 64'; Jensen 81'; Wittkamp (yellow card) | Report | Marek 75'; Schuster (yellow card) | Stadium: Bökelbergstadion; Attendance: 34,500; Referee: Ferdinand Biwersi |

| 27 September 1975 9 | Bayern Munich | 3–1 | Hannover 96 | Munich |
| 15:30 CET | Roth 18', 75'; Torstensson 61' | Report | Hayduk 82'; Höfer (yellow card) | Stadium: Olympic Stadium; Attendance: 48,000; Referee: Manfred Wichmann |

| 4 October 1975 10 | 1. FC Kaiserslautern | 2–1 | Bayern Munich | Kaiserslautern |
| 15:30 CET | Toppmöller 34', 85'; Meier (yellow card) | Report | Wunder 38'; Dürnberger (yellow card) | Stadium: Betzenbergstadion; Attendance: 34,000; Referee: Walter Eschweiler |

| 25 October 1975 11 | Bayern Munich | 1–0 | Hamburger SV | Munich |
| 15:30 CET | Kapellmann 13' (yellow card) | Report | Björnmose (yellow card) | Stadium: Olympic Stadium; Attendance: 52,000; Referee: Peter Gabor |

| 31 October 1975 12 | MSV Duisburg | 1–1 | Bayern Munich | Duisburg |
| 20:00 CET | Dietz 6'; Schneider (yellow card) | Report | Zobel 65'; Torstensson (yellow card) | Stadium: Wedaustadion; Attendance: 30,000; Referee: Herbert Lutz |

| 8 November 1975 13 | Bayern Munich | 5–1 | Rot-Weiß Essen | Munich |
| 15:30 CET | Wunder 18', 83'; Torstensson 50'; Dürnberger 71' (pen.); Rummenigge 76' | Report | Lippens 84'; Bast (penalty missed) 29' | Stadium: Olympic Stadium; Attendance: 17,200; Referee: Volker Roth |

| 15 November 1975 14 | VfL Bochum | 3–1 | Bayern Munich | Bochum |
| 15:30 CET | Trimhold 27'; Tenhagen 30'; Fromm 74' | Report | Kapellmann 80' (yellow card) | Stadium: Stadion an der Castroper Straße; Attendance: 28,000; Referee: Walter Horstmann |

| 22 November 1975 15 | Eintracht Frankfurt | 6–0 | Bayern Munich | Frankfurt |
| 15:30 CET | Wenzel 40' (pen.); Nickel 17', 61'; Grabowski 28'; Hölzenbein 40'; Neuberger 45' | Report | | Stadium: Waldstadion; Attendance: 55,000; Referee: Walter Eschweiler |

| 29 November 1975 16 | Bayern Munich | 1–2 | 1. FC Köln | Munich |
| 15:30 CET | Rummenigge 15'; Dürnberger (penalty missed) 59'; Beckenbauer (yellow card); Marek (yellow card) | Report | Strack 41'; Neumann 69' (yellow card); Konopka (yellow card); Cullmann (yellow card) | Stadium: Olympic Stadium; Attendance: 30,000; Referee: Jan Redelfs |

| 6 December 1975 17 | Hertha BSC | 2–1 | Bayern Munich | Berlin |
| 15:30 CET | Beer (penalty missed) 29'; Szymanek 69'; Horr 71'; Kliemann (yellow card) | Report | Kapellmann 8'; Horsmann (yellow card) | Stadium: Olympic Stadium; Attendance: 45,000; Referee: Manfred Wichmann |

| 17 January 1976 18 | Eintracht Braunschweig | 1–1 | Bayern Munich | Braunschweig |
| 15:30 CET | Hollmann 82'; Merkhoffer (yellow card) | Report | Roth 53'; Kapellmann (yellow card); Schwarzenbeck (yellow card) | Stadium: Eintracht-Stadion; Attendance: 38,000; Referee: Karl-Heinz Fork |

| 24 January 1976 19 | Bayern Munich | 2–0 | Karlsruher SC | Munich |
| 15:30 CET | Hoeneß 20'; Roth 55' | Report | | Stadium: Olympic Stadium; Attendance: 26,000; Referee: Wolf-Dieter Ahlenfelder |

| 7 February 1976 20 | Werder Bremen | 0–0 | Bayern Munich | Bremen |
| 15:30 CET | | Report | Müller (yellow card) | Stadium: Weserstadion; Attendance: 25,000; Referee: Rainer Waltert |

| 14 February 1976 21 | Bayern Munich | 2–0 | Bayer 05 Uerdingen | Munich |
| 15:30 CET | Müller 54' (pen.); Rummenigge 85' | Report | | Stadium: Olympic Stadium; Attendance: 7,000; Referee: Herbert Lutz |

| 21 February 1976 22 | Fortuna Düsseldorf | 1–1 | Bayern Munich | Düsseldorf |
| 15:30 CET | Hesse 1' | Report | Beckenbauer 65'; Horsmann (yellow card) | Stadium: Rheinstadion; Attendance: 31,000; Referee: Karl-Heinz Picker |

| 6 March 1976 23 | Bayern Munich | 3–2 | FC Schalke 04 | Munich |
| 15:30 CET | Kapellmann 26'; Dürnberger 37'; Müller 41' (pen.) | Report | Gede 50'; Sobieray 62' (yellow card) | Stadium: Olympic Stadium; Attendance: 25,000; Referee: Jan Redelfs |

| 13 March 1976 24 | Kickers Offenbach | 2–2 | Bayern Munich | Offenbach |
| 15:30 CET | Rausch 29'; Held 72'; Bitz (yellow card) | Report | Müller 8'; Roth 47' | Stadium: Stadion am Bieberer Berg; Attendance: 25,000; Referee: Manfred Wichmann |

| 20 March 1976 25 | Bayern Munich | 4–0 | Borussia Mönchengladbach | Munich |
| 15:30 CET | Schwarzenbeck 7'; Hoeneß 10', 59'; Müller 64' (pen.) | Report | | Stadium: Olympic Stadium; Attendance: 75,000; Referee: Walter Horstmann |

| 27 March 1976 26 | Hannover 96 | 2–2 | Bayern Munich | Hannover |
| 15:00 CET | Lüttges 45', 47' | Report | Kapellmann 16'; Dürnberger 79' | Stadium: Niedersachsenstadion; Attendance: 48,500; Referee: Paul Kindervater |

| 10 April 1976 27 | Bayern Munich | 3–4 | 1. FC Kaiserslautern | Munich |
| 15:30 CET | Kapellmann 6' (yellow card); Roth 52'; Hoeneß 54'; Zobel (yellow card) | Report | Toppmöller 44', 62', 81'; Riedl 57' | Stadium: Olympic Stadium; Attendance: 43,000; Referee: Klaus Ohmsen |

| 17 April 1976 28 | Hamburger SV | 0–1 | Bayern Munich | Hamburg |
| 15:30 CET | | Report | Müller 74' | Stadium: Volksparkstadion; Attendance: 62,000; Referee: Paul Kindervater |

| 1 May 1976 29 | Bayern Munich | 3–0 | MSV Duisburg | Munich |
| 15:30 CET | Müller 39', 63', 72' | Report | | Stadium: Olympic Stadium; Attendance: 22,000; Referee: Eckhard Jensen |

| 8 May 1976 30 | Rot-Weiß Essen | 3–3 | Bayern Munich | Essen |
| 15:30 CET | Burgsmüller 55', 65'; Hrubesch 74' (pen.) | Report | Müller 72' (pen.), 75'; Beckenbauer 81'; Rummenigge (yellow card) | Stadium: Georg-Melches-Stadion; Attendance: 25,000; Referee: Herbert Lutz |

| 15 May 1976 31 | Bayern Munich | 4–0 | VfL Bochum | Munich |
| 15:30 CET | Beckenbauer 33'; Künkel 52'; Müller 56', 82' (pen.) | Report | Tenhagen (yellow card) | Stadium: Olympic Stadium; Attendance: 26,000; Referee: Gert Meuser |

| 29 May 1976 32 | Bayern Munich | 1–1 | Eintracht Frankfurt | Munich |
| 15:30 CET | Horsmann 58'; Beckenbauer (yellow card); Schwarzenbeck (yellow card); Rummenigge (yellow card) | Report | Grabowski 59'; Weidle (yellow card); Körbel (yellow card) | Stadium: Olympic Stadium; Attendance: 35,000; Referee: Peter Gabor |

| 4 April 1976 33 | 1. FC Köln | 1–0 | Bayern Munich | Cologne |
| 15:30 CET | Konopka 77' | Report | | Stadium: Müngersdorfer Stadion; Attendance: 58,000; Referee: Ferdinand Biwersi |

| 12 June 1976 34 | Bayern Munich | 7–4 | Hertha BSC | Munich |
| 15:30 CET | Müller 3', 18', 23' (pen.), 31', 84'; Künkel 37'; Rummenigge 40' | Report | Weiner 72'; Szymanek 82', 87', 89' | Stadium: Olympic Stadium; Attendance: 21,000; Referee: Wilfried Hilker |

=== DFB-Pokal ===
| 1 August 1975 1st Round | Bayern Munich | 3–1 | 1. FC Saarbrücken | Munich |
| CET | Müller 46', 73' (pen.); Schwarzenbeck 50'; Horsmann (yellow card) | Report | Cremer 41' | Stadium: Olympic Stadium; Attendance: 14,000; Referee: Heinz Aldinger |

| 18 October 1975 2nd Round | Bünder SV | 0–3 | Bayern Munich | Herford |
| CET | | Report | Schuster 15'; Roth 52'; Beckenbauer 79' | Stadium: Friedrich-Ludwig-Jahn-Stadion; Attendance: 22,000; Referee: Dieter Stäglich |

| 13 December 1975 3rd Round | Bayern Munich | 3–0 | Tennis Borussia Berlin | Munich |
| CET | Torstensson 16'; Müller 60'; Rummenigge 82' | Report | | Stadium: Olympic Stadium; Attendance: 12,000; Referee: Heinz Kettenbach |

| 31 January 1976 Round of 16 | FK Pirmasens | 0–2 | Bayern Munich | Pirmasens |
| CET | | Report | Müller 55'; Schwarzenbeck 70' | Stadium: Sportpark Husterhöhe; Attendance: 18,000; Referee: Hans-Joachim Weyland |

| 3 April 1976 Quarterfinals | 1. FC Köln | 2–5 | Bayern Munich | Cologne |
| CET | Müller 10', 67' | Report | Horsmann 6'; Müller 27', 57', 60'; Hoeneß 34' | Stadium: Müngersdorfer Stadion; Attendance: 50,000; Referee: Roth |

| 4 May 1976 Semifinals | Hamburger SV | 2–2 (a.e.t.) | Bayern Munich | Hamburg |
| CET | Björnmose 53'; Nogly 115'; Hidien (yellow card) | Report | Rummenigge 71'; Beckenbauer 94'; Andersson (yellow card) | Stadium: Volksparkstadion; Attendance: 52,000; Referee: Hermann Schröder |

| 1 June 1976 Semifinals | Bayern Munich | 0–1 | Hamburger SV | Munich |
| CET | Müller (penalty missed) 83' | Report | Eigl 90'; Björnmose (yellow card) | Stadium: Olympic Stadium; Attendance: 55,000; Referee: Günter Linn |

=== European Cup ===
| 17 September 1975 1st Round | Jeunesse Esch (Luxembourg) | 0–5 | (West Germany) Bayern Munich | Esch-sur-Alzette |
| 19:30 CET | | Report | Zobel 29', 35'; Schuster 63'; Rummenigge 69', 78' | Stadium: Stade de la Frontière; Attendance: 15,739; Referee: Alexis Ponnet (Belgium) |

| 1 October 1975 1st Round | Bayern Munich (West Germany) | 3–1 (8–1 agg.) | (Luxembourg) Jeunesse Esch | Munich |
| 20:00 CET | Schuster 30', 83', 88' | Report | Zwally 86' | Stadium: Olympic Stadium; Attendance: 8,000; Referee: Zdenek Jelinek (Czechoslovakia) |

| 22 October 1975 Round of 16 | Malmö FF (Sweden) | 1–0 | (West Germany) Bayern Munich | Malmö |
| 19:00 CET | Andersson 27' | Report | | Stadium: Malmö Stadion; Attendance: 23,000; Referee: Vladimir Rudnev (Russia) |

| 5 November 1975 Round of 16 | Bayern Munich (West Germany) | 2–0 (2–1 agg.) | (Sweden) Malmö FF | Munich |
| 20:00 CET | Dürnberger 59' (pen.); Torstensson 77' | Report | | Stadium: Olympic Stadium; Attendance: 47,000; Referee: Tzwetan Petrov Stanev (Bulgaria) |

| 3 March 1976 Quarter-finals | Benfica (Portugal) | 0–0 | (West Germany) Bayern Munich | Lisbon |
| 22:30 CET | | Report | Kapellmann (yellow card) 56' | Stadium: Estádio da Luz (1954); Attendance: 70,000; Referee: John Robertson P. Gordon (Scotland) |

| 17 March 1976 Quarter-finals | Bayern Munich (West Germany) | 5–1 (5–1 agg.) | (Portugal) Benfica | Munich |
| 20:00 CET | Dürnberger 50', 55'; Rummenigge 68'; Müller 73', 83' | Report | Barros 70'; Toni (yellow card) 17' | Stadium: Olympic Stadium; Attendance: 74,500; Referee: Hilmi Ok (Turkey) |

| 31 March 1976 Semi-finals | Real Madrid (Spain) | 1–1 | (West Germany) Bayern Munich | Madrid |
| 21:00 CET | Martínez 7' | Report | Müller 42' | Stadium: Santiago Bernabéu Stadium; Attendance: 111,000; Referee: Erich Linemayr (Austria) |

| 14 April 1976 Semi-finals | Bayern Munich (West Germany) | 2–0 (3–1 agg.) | (Spain) Real Madrid | Munich |
| 20:00 CET | Müller 9', 31' | Report | Amaro (yellow card) 60' (yellow-red card) 90+1' | Stadium: Olympic Stadium; Attendance: 78,000; Referee: Clive Thomas (Wales) |

| 12 May 1976 Final | Bayern Munich (West Germany) | 1–0 | (France) Saint-Étienne | Glasgow |
| 20:15 CET | Roth 57' | Report | | Stadium: Hampden Park; Attendance: 54,864; Referee: Károly Palotai (Hungary) |

=== European Super Cup ===
| 9 September 1975 Final | Bayern Munich (West Germany) | 0–1 | (Soviet Union) Dynamo Kyiv | Munich |
| CET | | Report | Blokhin 66' | Stadium: Olympic Stadium; Attendance: 30,000; Referee: Sergio Gonella (Italy) |

| 6 October 1975 Final | Dynamo Kyiv (Soviet Union) | 2–0 (3–0 agg.) | (West Germany) Bayern Munich | Kiev |
| 19:00 CET | Blokhin 40', 53' | Report | | Stadium: Republican Stadium; Attendance: 105,000; Referee: Dogan Babacan (Turkey) |
