= 1977–78 FC Bayern Munich season =

13th season of Bayern Munich in the Bundesliga

Bayern Munich
1977–78 season
- Chairman: Wilhelm Neudecker
- Manager: Dettmar Cramer; Gyula Lóránt
- Stadium: Olympiastadion
- Bundesliga: 12th
- DFB-Pokal: Third round
- UEFA Cup: Round of 16
- Top goalscorer: League: Gerd Müller (24); All: Gerd Müller (32)

The 1977–78 FC Bayern Munich season was the club's 13th season in Bundesliga.

== Review and events ==
Bayern Munich placed 12th in the domestic competition, its worst Bundesliga result ever. In the UEFA Cup they were defeated by Eintracht Frankfurt 6–1 on aggregate in the Round of 16. To make things even worse, Bayern were knocked out by an unheralded side Homburg in the DFB-Pokal.

== Match results ==
=== Legend ===
Win Draw Loss

=== Bundesliga ===
6 August 1977 1	VfB Stuttgart	3–3	Bayern Munich	Stuttgart
15:30 CET	Müller 17' (pen.), 53' (pen.); Elmer 33'	Report	Janzon 36'; Müller 43', 89'; Oblak (yellow card)	Stadium: Neckarstadion; Attendance: 71,000; Referee: Dieter Dreher

13 August 1977 2	Bayern Munich	4–2	FC St. Pauli	Munich
15:30 CET	Müller 12', 32' (pen.), 37', 80'; Rausch (yellow card)	Report	Tune-Hansen 43'; Gerber 45'	Stadium: Olympiastadion; Attendance: 34,000; Referee: Heinz Quindeau

17 August 1978 3	Fortuna Düsseldorf	4–2	Bayern Munich	Düsseldorf
20:00 CET	K. Allofs 49', 52'; Zimmermann 82'; Hickersberger 86'	Report	Janzon 45'; Müller 66'	Stadium: Rheinstadion; Attendance: 50,000; Referee: Ferdinand Biwersi

27 August 1977 4	Bayern Munich	0–3	1. FC Köln	Munich
15:30 CET		Report	Schwarzenbeck 5' (o.g.); D. Müller 57'; Konopka 83'	Stadium: Olympiastadion; Attendance: 50,000; Referee: Walter Horstmann

31 August 1977 5	Werder Bremen	1–1	Bayern Munich	Bremen
15:30 CET	Röber 62'	Report	Niedermayer 68'	Stadium: Weserstadion; Attendance: 32,000; Referee: Rainer Waltert

3 September 1977 6	Bayern Munich	1–1	VfL Bochum	Munich
15:30 CET	Müller 61' (pen.)	Report	Tenhagen 12'; Schwemmle (yellow card)	Stadium: Olympiastadion; Attendance: 19,300; Referee: Medardus Luca

10 September 1977 7	Bayern Munich	3–2	Eintracht Braunschweig	Munich
15:30 CET	Müller 14', 73'; Hoeneß 44'; Oblak (yellow card); Rausch (yellow card)	Report	Hollmann 20'; Breitner 72'; Borg (yellow card); Popivoda (yellow card)	Stadium: Olympiastadion; Attendance: 35,000; Referee: Wolf-Dieter Ahlenfelder

17 September 1977 8	1. FC Saarbrücken	2–1	Bayern Munich	Saarbrücken
15:30 CET	Lorant 4' (pen.) (yellow card); H. Traser 85'	Report	Müller 7'; Oblak (yellow card); Rausch (yellow card); Kappellmann (red card) 88'	Stadium: Ludwigsparkstadion; Attendance: 34,000; Referee: Gerd Henning

24 September 1977 9	Bayern Munich	7–1	Schalke 04	Munich
15:30 CET	Schwarzenbeck 24' (yellow card); Weiß (red card) 28'; Dürnberger 30'; Hoeneß 59'; Niedermayer 73'; Müller 79' (yellow card); Rummenigge 85'; Bongartz 90' (o.g.)	Report	Abramczik 36'	Stadium: Olympiastadion; Attendance: 70,000; Referee: Gert Meuser

4 October 1977 10	Hamburger SV	2–2	Bayern Munich	Hamburg
15:30 CET	Keller 69'; Reimann 78'	Report	Dürnberger 61'; Hoeneß 83'	Stadium: Volksparkstadion; Attendance: 55,000; Referee: Walter Engel

12 October 1977 11	Bayern Munich	3–0	Borussia Dortmund	Munich
22:00 CET	Augenthaler 20'; Müller 35' (penalty missed) 49'; Rummenigge 75'	Report		Stadium: Olympiastadion; Attendance: 20,000; Referee: Walter Horstmann

22 October 1977 12	Borussia Mönchengladbach	2–0	Bayern Munich	Mönchengladbach
15:30 CET	Heynckes 9', 48'	Report	Schwarzenbeck (yellow card)	Stadium: Bökelbergstadion; Attendance: 35,200; Referee: Jan Redelfs

29 October 1977 13	Bayern Munich	0–2	Hertha BSC	Munich
15:30 CET	Oblak (yellow card)	Report	Grau 29'; Gersdorff 89'	Stadium: Olympiastadion; Attendance: 19,000; Referee: Dr. Dieter Stäglich

5 November 1977 14	MSV Duisburg	6–3	Bayern Munich	Duisburg
15:30 CET	Dietz 20', 49', 76', 78'; Worm 83'; Stolzenburg 85'	Report	Künkel 24'; Müller 44' (pen.), 57'; Kappellmann (yellow card)	Stadium: Wedaustadion; Attendance: 20,000; Referee: Volker Roth

12 November 1977 15	Bayern Munich	1–3	1860 Munich	Munich
15:30 CET	Rummenigge 31' (red card) 90'; Rausch (yellow card)	Report	Scheller 46', 90' (pen.); Kohlhäufl 84'; Glavovic (yellow card)	Stadium: Grünwalder Stadion; Attendance: 77,573; Referee: Ferdinand Biwersi

26 November 1977 16	Eintracht Frankfurt	4–0	Bayern Munich	Frankfurt
15:30 CET	Hölzenbein 4'; Wenzel 38'; Kraus 56'; Grabowski 75'; Müller (yellow card); Weidle (yellow card)	Report	Schwarzenbeck (yellow card); Kappellmann (yellow card)	Stadium: Waldstadion; Attendance: 43,000; Referee: Rainer Waltert

3 December 1977 17	Bayern Munich	4–2	1. FC Kaiserslautern	Munich
15:30 CET	Roth 3'; Müller 29' (pen.); Hoeneß 70', 89'; Kappellmann (yellow card)	Report	Stickel 67'; Wendt 80'	Stadium: Olympiastadion; Attendance: 20,000; Referee: Werner Burgers

10 December 1977 18	Bayern Munich	2–0	VfB Stuttgart	Munich
15:30 CET	Augenthaler 77'; Müller 83'	Report	Förster (yellow card)	Stadium: Olympiastadion; Attendance: 37,000; Referee: Günter Linn

17 December 1977 19	FC St. Pauli	0–0	Bayern Munich	Hamburg
15:30 CET		Report		Stadium: Wilhelm-Koch-Stadion; Attendance: 17,000; Referee: Medardus Luca

7 January 1978 20	Bayern Munich	0–0	Fortuna Düsseldorf	Munich
15:30 CET		Report	Hickersberger (yellow card)	Stadium: Olympiastadion; Attendance: 12,986; Referee: Eckhard Jensen

14 January 1978 21	1. FC Köln	2–0	Bayern Munich	Cologne
15:30 CET	Neumann 58' van Gool 74'	Report	Oblak (yellow card)	Stadium: Müngersdorfer Stadion; Attendance: 53,000; Referee: Volker Roth

21 January 1978 22	Bayern Munich	3–1	Werder Bremen	Munich
15:30 CET	Rausch 16'; Rummenigge 29'; Müller 61'	Report	Bracht 57'	Stadium: Olympiastadion; Attendance: 12,000; Referee: Walter Eschweiler

28 January 1978 23	VfL Bochum	2–1	Bayern Munich	Bochum
15:30 CET	Bast 75', 85'	Report	Rausch 88'; Horsmann (yellow card)	Stadium: Stadion an der Castroper Straße; Attendance: 31,000; Referee: Walter Engel

4 February 1978 24	Eintracht Braunschweig	1–1	Bayern Munich	Braunschweig
15:30 CET	Breitner 75'; Dremmler (yellow card)	Report	Rummenigge 51'; Horsmann (yellow card)	Stadium: Eintracht-Stadion; Attendance: 18,000; Referee: Rainer Waltert

11 February 1978 25	Bayern Munich	7–1	1. FC Saarbrücken	Munich
15:30 CET	Müller 24', 44'; Niedermayer 35', 62'; Hoeneß 51'; Rummenigge 63'; Künkel 82'	Report	Lorant 90' (pen.) (yellow card)	Stadium: Olympiastadion; Attendance: 10,500; Referee: Wolf-Dieter Ahlenfelder

18 February 1978 26	Schalke 04	3–2	Bayern Munich	Gelsenkirchen
15:30 CET	Fischer 5'; Abramczik 42', 55'; Lütkebohmert (yellow card)	Report	Rummenigge 51'; Müller 79' (pen.); Niedermayer (yellow card)	Stadium: Parkstadion; Attendance: 35,000; Referee: Klaus Ohmsen

25 February 1978 27	Bayern Munich	2–0	Hamburger SV	Munich
15;30 CET	Hoeneß 6'; Müller 89' (pen.)	Report	Magath (yellow card)	Stadium: Olympiastadion; Attendance: 23,000; Referee: Gerd Henning

4 February 1978 28	Borussia Dortmund	1–1	Bayern Munich	Dortmund
15:30 CET	Geyer 51'; Wagner (yellow card) a	Report	Janzon 84'; Müller (yellow card); Augenthaler (yellow card); Niedermayer (yellow card)	Stadium: Westfalenstadion; Attendance: 44,622; Referee: Medardus Luca

11 March 1978 29	Bayern Munich	1–1	Borussia Mönchengladbach	Munich
15:30 CET	Müller 36'	Report	Del'Haye 87'	Stadium: Olympiastadion; Attendance: 48,000; Referee: Jan Redelfs

18 March 1978 30	Hertha BSC	3–1	Bayern Munich	Berlin
15:30 CET	Nüssing 11'; Sidka 69'; Brück 90' (pen.)	Report	Oblak 84'; Rummenigge (yellow card)	Stadium: Olympiastadion; Attendance: 28,000; Referee: Werner Burgers

1 April 1978 31	Bayern Munich	3–2	MSV Duisburg	Munich
15:30 CET	Hoeneß 16', 22'; Rummenigge 42'	Report	Worm 54'; Bücker 88'; Büsser (yellow card)	Stadium: Olympiastadion; Attendance: 17,000; Referee: Jörg Glasneck

8 April 1978 32	1860 Munich	1–1	Bayern Munich	Munich
15:30 CET	Vöhringer 68'; Scheller (yellow card)	Report	Hoeneß 59'; Augenthaler (yellow card)	Stadium: Olympiastadion; Attendance: 60,000; Referee: Walter Horstmann

22 April 1978 33	Bayern Munich	2–1	Eintracht Frankfurt	Munich
15:30 CET	Hoeneß 11'; Müller 81' (pen.)	Report	Nickel 18'	Stadium: Olympiastadion; Attendance: 19,700; Referee: Paul Kindervater

29 April 1978 34	1. FC Kaiserslautern	5–0	Bayern Munich	Kaiserslautern
15:30 CET	Toppmöller 20', 58' (pen.), 78'; Wendt 30'; Geye 74'	Report		Stadium: Betzenbergstadion; Attendance: 25,000; Referee: Günther Risse

=== DFB-Pokal ===
10 August 1977 Round 1	1. FC Saarbrücken	1–2	Bayern Munich	Saarbrücken
CET	Traser 35'	Report	Müller 71' (pen.); Künkel 88'; Rausch (yellow card)	Stadium: Ludwigsparkstadion; Attendance: 30,000; Referee: Paul Kindervater

19 August 1977 Round 2	Bayern Munich	3–1	Eintracht Trier	Munich
CET	Künkel 15'; Müller 47', 87' (pen.); Horsmann (yellow card)	Report	Hermandung 30'	Stadium: Olympiastadion; Attendance: 7,216; Referee: Klaus Clajus

15 October 1977 Round 3	FC 08 Homburg	3–1	Bayern Munich	Homburg
CET	Hodel 47'; Schwickert 63'; Lenz 80'	Report	Müller 55'; Augenthaler (yellow card)	Stadium: Waldstadion Homburg; Attendance: 20,000; Referee: Walter Eschweiler

=== UEFA Cup ===
==== First round ====
14 September 1977 First leg	Bayern Munich (West Germany)	8–0	(Norway) Mjøndalen IF	Munich
CET	Oblak 16'; Rummenigge 36', 40', 46'; Hoeneß 53'; Müller 57', 73', 81'	Report		Stadium: Olympiastadion; Attendance: 6,500; Referee: Josef Poucek (Czech Republic)

28 September 1977 Second leg	Mjøndalen IF (Norway)	0–4 (0–12 agg.)	(West Germany) Bayern Munich	Oslo
CET		Report	Rausch 17'; Gruber 52'; Künkel 62'; Niedermayer 64'	Stadium: Ullevaal Stadion; Attendance: 7,000; Referee: John Hunting (England)

==== Second round ====
19 October 1977 First leg	Bayern Munich (West Germany)	3–0	(Bulgaria) PFC Marek Dupnitsa	Munich
CET	Müller 44'; Rummenigge 50', 64'	Report		Stadium: Olympiastadion; Attendance: 12,000; Referee: Paul Bonett (Malta)

2 November 1977 Second leg	PFC Marek Dupnitsa (Bulgaria)	2–0 (2–3 agg.)	(West Germany) Bayern Munich	Dupnitsa
CET	Petrov 32'; Pargov 37'	Report		Stadium: Bonchuk Stadium; Attendance: 40,000; Referee: Ertugrul Dilek (Turkey)

==== Third round ====
23 November 1977 First leg	Eintracht Frankfurt (West Germany)	4–0	(West Germany) Bayern Munich	Frankfurt
CET	Grabowski 23'; Hölzenbein 37'; Kraus 66'; Skala 67'	Report		Stadium: Waldstadion; Attendance: 26,000; Referee: Nicolae Rainea (Rumania)

7 December 1977 Second leg	Bayern Munich (West Germany)	1–2 (1–6 agg.)	(West Germany) Eintracht Frankfurt	Munich
CET	Rummenigge 3'	Report	Wenzel 83'; Hölzenbein 86' (yellow card)	Stadium: Olympiastadion; Attendance: 13,000; Referee: Cesare Gussoni (Italy)
