= 1975 European Cup final =

- Match programme cover
- Event: 1974–75 European Cup
Bayern Munich	Leeds United
(Germany)	(England)
2	0
- Date: 28 May 1975
- Venue: Parc des Princes, Paris
- Referee: Michel Kitabdjian (France)
- Attendance: 48,374

The 1975 European Cup final was a football match between Bayern Munich of West Germany and Leeds United of England, played on 28 May 1975 at the Parc des Princes in Paris. It was the final match of the 1974–75 season of Europe's premier cup competition, the European Cup. Bayern Munich were appearing in their second final; they had won the previous season's competition, beating Spanish team Atlético Madrid 4–0 in a replay after the first match finished 1–1. Leeds were appearing in their first final.

As defending champions of the European Cup, Bayern Munich received a bye in the first round, while Leeds progressed through four rounds to reach the final. Bayern's matches were generally close affairs. They beat Soviet team Ararat Yerevan 2–1 on aggregate in the quarter-finals and won their semi-final tie against French team Saint-Étienne 2–0 on aggregate. Leeds matches ranged from close affairs to comfortable victories. They beat Hungarian team Újpest 5–1 on aggregate in the second round, while they beat Barcelona of Spain 3–2 on aggregate in the semi-final.

Watched by a crowd of 48,374, Leeds had the best of the opening exchanges of the match and had two appeals for a penalty kick turned down by the referee Michel Kitabdjian. Bayern suffered two injuries in the first half, to defender Björn Andersson and striker Uli Hoeneß, following strong tackles by Leeds players. A Peter Lorimer goal for Leeds in the 62nd minute was disallowed, when Billy Bremner was adjudged to be offside. Franz Roth scored in the 71st minute for Bayern and Gerd Müller extended the lead ten minutes later, to secure a 2–0 victory for Bayern.

It was Bayern's second consecutive victory in the competition, although they failed to retain their Bundesliga title, finishing in 10th place. Riots by the Leeds fans during the match led to UEFA banning the club from European competition for four years, although this was reduced to two years on appeal.

== Background ==
Bayern Munich were appearing in what would be their second of three consecutive European Cup finals, all of which they would win. The Bavarian side contained many great players such as Franz Beckenbauer, Gerd Müller and Uli Hoeneß, who had featured heavily in West Germany's 1974 World Cup victory the previous season, and as such were heavy favourites. In the 1974–75 Bundesliga season, Bayern had a serious slump after winning the previous three German championships. This was said to be caused by motivational deficits, especially as six of the Bayern players also won the 1972 European Championship and the 1974 World Cup. To boot, at the start of the season Paul Breitner moved to Real Madrid.

Bayern became the domestically worst-performing winner of the European Champions Cup up to then, finishing only 10th in the Bundesliga with a negative goal difference. Only Aston Villa would do domestically worse in the year of their European title win. In 1982, when they defeated Bayern 1–0 in the final, the team from Birmingham finished 11th in the First Division but a positive goal difference. For Bayern coach Dettmar Cramer, who took over from Udo Lattek early in the season, this was the first of three international club titles. He remained without domestic silverware. Franz Roth scored for the second time in a European final, after the Cup Winners' Cup final in 1967, putting Bayern ahead 1–0 in this final, and drew level with Sandro Mazzola from Italy's Inter Milan, who achieved this in the champions' finals 1964 and 1967.

For Leeds United – only the second English club to reach the final after Manchester United in 1968, and the second team in history to reach the finals of all three European cup competitions after FC Barcelona – the game was the climax of the "glory years" of the team built by former manager Don Revie. Among the stars of the team were the Scottish internationals Billy Bremner and Peter Lorimer. This would be the club's last appearance in a major cup final until they reached the 1996 League Cup final.

Like Bayern Munich, Leeds also had a rather poor season domestically; the experienced, but now aging side had finished only 9th in the First Division. Thus, only the winner of the final between Bayern and Leeds would be entitled to participate in the European Cup competition the following season.

== Route to the final ==
Bayern Munich				Round	Leeds United			
Opponent	Agg.	1st leg	2nd leg		Opponent	Agg.	1st leg	2nd leg
Bye				First round	(Switzerland) Zürich	5–3	4–1 (H)	1–2 (A)
(East Germany) 1. FC Magdeburg	5–3	3–2 (H)	2–1 (A)	Second round	(Hungary) Újpesti Dózsa	5–1	2–1 (A)	3–0 (H)
(Soviet Union) Ararat Yerevan	2–1	2–0 (H)	0–1 (A)	Quarter-finals	(Belgium) Anderlecht	4–0	3–0 (H)	1–0 (A)
(France) Saint-Étienne	2–0	0–0 (A)	2–0 (H)	Semi-finals	(Spain) Barcelona	3–2	2–1 (H)	1–1 (A)

== Match ==
=== Summary ===
Leeds United dominated most of the match and had a number of near misses, while Bayern created few chances. The match became controversial for several hotly contested refereeing decisions.

After three minutes, Bayern's Swedish international defender Björn Andersson had his leg broken by Terry Yorath while the ball was not in play, which was described by German international Uli Hoeneß as the "most brutal foul I think I have ever seen". Yorath was not sent off. Andersson was replaced by Sepp Weiß, and only played a handful more matches for Bayern. In the 23rd minute, Bayern captain Franz Beckenbauer was in his own penalty box on the ground and rested on his left arm which subsequently came into contact with the ball. The Leeds players appealed for a penalty, which the French referee Michel Kitabdjian denied. More controversial, however, was when the referee denied Leeds a penalty in the 34th minute after Beckenbauer tripped Allan Clarke, who was attacking the Bayern goal from the left wing and seemed ready to round Bayern goalkeeper Sepp Maier. The first half also saw Uli Hoeneß suffer a serious knee injury in the 37th minute after turning awkwardly on the pitch, which would ultimately bring his career to a premature end in 1979 at the age of 27, at which time he began his career in club management; he went on to become president of Bayern. He was replaced in this match by one-time German international Klaus Wunder.

In the 62nd minute, Billy Bremner was denied from five metres by a close reflex save of Sepp Maier in the Bayern goal. Less than a minute later a goal by Peter Lorimer was disallowed, due to Bremner being in a tight passive offside position in front of the goal at the six-yard box. The linesman who did not flag for offside returned to the half-way line, and referee Michel Kitabdjian pointed to the centre circle (indicating a goal and the restart of play from a kick off) before Beckenbauer convinced the referee to discuss the possibility of offside with the linesman. Thereupon, the referee indicated offside against Bremner. This decision caused riots to break out with Leeds fans believing 'they were really being cheated'.

After a match interruption Roth finished off a counter-attack in the 71st minute by taking the lead for Bayern after a short pass from Conny Torstensson. Ten minutes later another counter led to a second goal for Bayern through Gerd Müller after a cross from the right side by Jupp Kapellmann.

Violence after match, which included "skirmishes in the city and damage to private property" according to journalist Geoffrey Green, as well as damage to a £50,000 camera and a lost eye and a broken arm to German media workers, caused UEFA to consider abandonment of European competition altogether. The violence saw Leeds banned from Europe for four years, reduced to two years on appeal.

=== Details ===
28 May 1975
19:15 CET

Bayern Munich (West Germany)	2–0	(England) Leeds United
Roth 71'; Müller 81'	Report

Parc des Princes, Paris
Attendance: 48,374
Referee: Michel Kitabdjian (France)

Bayern Munich	Leeds United

GK	1	(West Germany) Sepp Maier
RB	2	(West Germany) Bernd Dürnberger
CB	4	(West Germany) Hans-Georg Schwarzenbeck	(yellow card) 20'
CB	5	(West Germany) Franz Beckenbauer (c)
LB	3	(Sweden) Björn Andersson		(substituted off) 4'
RM	8	(West Germany) Rainer Zobel
CM	7	(Sweden) Conny Torstensson
LM	6	(West Germany) Franz Roth
RF	10	(West Germany) Uli Hoeneß		(substituted off) 42'
CF	9	(West Germany) Gerd Müller
LF	11	(West Germany) Jupp Kapellmann
Substitutes:
FW	12	(West Germany) Klaus Wunder		(substituted on) 42'
MF	13	(West Germany) Sepp Weiß		(substituted on) 4'
FW	14	(West Germany) Karl-Heinz Rummenigge
DF	15	(West Germany) Bernd Förster
GK	16	(West Germany) Hugo Robl
Manager:
(West Germany) Dettmar Cramer

GK	1	(Scotland) David Stewart
RB	2	(England) Paul Reaney	(yellow card) 7'
CB	6	(England) Norman Hunter	(yellow card) 83'
CB	5	(England) Paul Madeley
LB	3	(Scotland) Frank Gray
RM	7	(Scotland) Peter Lorimer
CM	4	(Scotland) Billy Bremner (c)
CM	10	(Republic of Ireland) Johnny Giles
LM	11	(Wales) Terry Yorath		(substituted off) 80'
CF	8	(England) Allan Clarke
CF	9	(Scotland) Joe Jordan
Substitutes:
GK	12	(Wales) Glan Letheren
DF	13	(England) Trevor Cherry
DF	14	(England) Peter Hampton
MF	15	(Scotland) Eddie Gray		(substituted on) 80'
FW	16	(England) Duncan McKenzie
Manager:
(England) Jimmy Armfield

== Legacy ==
The controversy surrounding the final is still manifested in the chant "We are the Champions, Champions of Europe" – amid a feeling that their club was cheated of victory in this match – by fans of Leeds United.

Bayern remained one of Europe's top clubs and would go on to victory in the 1976 final, completing a hat-trick of wins – but would have to wait until 2001 for their fourth title. Leeds were eliminated in the semi-finals by eventual runners-up Valencia CF in the same season, Leeds' best performance in the competition since 1974–75. As of 2025–26, they have not appeared in the competition since.

The appearance of an English club in the final for only the second time preceded a period of dominance by English clubs, with wins for Liverpool (1977, 1978, 1981 and 1984), Nottingham Forest (1979 and 1980) and Aston Villa (1982) in subsequent finals.

== See also ==
- 1974–75 FC Bayern Munich season
- 1974–75 Leeds United F.C. season
- 1975 European Cup Winners' Cup final
- 1975 European Super Cup
- 1975 UEFA Cup final
- FC Bayern Munich in international football
- Leeds United F.C. in European football
