= 1974–75 FC Bayern Munich season =

10th season of Bayern Munich in the Bundesliga

Bayern Munich
1974–75 season
- Chairman: Wilhelm Neudecker
- Manager: Udo Lattek until January, Dettmar Cramer from January
- Stadium: Olympiastadion
- Bundesliga: 10th
- DFB-Pokal: Third round
- European Cup: Winners
- European Super Cup: Withdrew
- Intercontinental Cup: Withdrew
- Top goalscorer: League: Gerd Müller (23); All: Gerd Müller (30)
| Home colours | Away colours |

The 1974–75 FC Bayern Munich season was the club's 10th season in Bundesliga.

== Review and events ==
After a poor first half of the 1974–75 season Udo Lattek was replaced by Dettmar Cramer. In Paris, the club defeated Leeds United with two late goals from Franz Roth and Gerd Müller.

== Squad ==
Note: Flags indicate national team as defined under FIFA eligibility rules; some limited exceptions apply. Players may hold more than one non-FIFA nationality.

| No. | Pos. | Nation | Player |
|---|---|---|---|
| — | GK | GER | Sepp Maier |
| — | GK | GER | Hugo Robl |
| — | DF | DEN | Johnny Hansen |
| — | DF | GER | Hans-Georg Schwarzenbeck |
| — | DF | GER | Franz Beckenbauer |
| — | DF | GER | Jupp Kapellmann |
| — | DF | SWE | Björn Andersson |
| — | DF | GER | Bernd Förster |
| — | DF | GER | Günther Weiß |
| — | DF | GER | Gernot Rohr |
| — | DF | GER | Richard Mamajewski |

| No. | Pos. | Nation | Player |
|---|---|---|---|
| — | MF | GER | Karl-Heinz Rummenigge |
| — | MF | SWE | Conny Torstensson |
| — | MF | GER | Rainer Zobel |
| — | MF | GER | Bernd Dürnberger |
| — | MF | GER | Franz Roth |
| — | MF | GER | Sepp Weiß |
| — | MF | GER | Erwin Hadewicz |
| — | FW | GER | Franz Michelberger |
| — | FW | GER | Gerd Müller |
| — | FW | GER | Uli Hoeneß |
| — | FW | GER | Klaus Wunder |

== Match results ==
=== Legend ===
Win Draw Loss

=== Bundesliga ===
| 24 August 1974 1 | Kickers Offenbach | 6–0 | Bayern Munich | Frankfurt |
| 15:30 CET | Schäfer 19'; Schwemmle 31'; Kostedde 49', 70'; Held 57'; Bihn 89' | Report | Müller (yellow card) | Stadium: Waldstadion; Attendance: 35,000; Referee: Klaus Ohmsen |

| 31 August 1974 2 | Bayern Munich | 2–1 | Hertha BSC | Munich |
| 15:30 CET | Schwarzenbeck 43'; Hoeneß 69' | Report | Magnusson 83'; Brück (yellow card) | Stadium: Olympic Stadium; Attendance: 38,000; Referee: Günter Linn |

| 11 September 1974 3 | VfB Stuttgart | 1–2 | Bayern Munich | Stuttgart |
| 15:30 CET | Brenninger 82'; Weidmann (yellow card); Zech (yellow card) | Report | Roth 51'; Wunder 69'; Kapellmann (yellow card); Hoeneß (yellow card) | Stadium: Neckarstadion; Attendance: 68,000; Referee: Paul Kindervater |

| 14 September 1974 4 | Bayern Munich | 6–3 | 1. FC Köln | Munich |
| 15:30 CET | Zobel 10'; Wunder 33' (pen.); Beckenbauer 54'; Kapellmann 69' (pen.); Müller 82'; Rummenigge 89'; Schwarzenbeck (yellow card) | Report | Müller 1'; Simmet 21'; Löhr 28' (pen.); Overath (yellow card); Flohe (yellow card); Cullmann (yellow card) | Stadium: Olympic Stadium; Attendance: 36,000; Referee: Heinz Quindeau |

| 21 September 1974 5 | Wuppertaler SV | 3–1 | Bayern Munich | Wuppertal |
| 15:30 CET | Pröpper 18'; Gerber 50'; Jung 60' (yellow card); Theodor Homann (yellow card) | Report | Hoeneß 69' | Stadium: Stadion am Zoo; Attendance: 22,000; Referee: Jan Redelfs |

| 28 September 1974 6 | Bayern Munich | 0–2 | FC Schalke 04 | Munich |
| 15:30 CET | | Report | Abramczik 68'; Lütkebohmert 89' | Stadium: Olympic Stadium; Attendance: 73,000; Referee: Walter Horstmann |

| 5 October 1974 7 | Eintracht Braunschweig | 3–1 | Bayern Munich | Braunschweig |
| 15:30 CET | Ristić 7'; Bründl 39' (pen.); Gersdorff 47'; Handschuh (yellow card) | Report | Hoeneß 84'; Schwarzenbeck (yellow card); Roth (yellow card) | Stadium: Eintracht-Stadion; Attendance: 38,000; Referee: Wilfried Hilker |

| 9 October 1974 8 | Bayern Munich | 2–0 | Werder Bremen | Munich |
| 20:00 CET | Hoeneß 19'; Kapellmann 63' | Report | | Stadium: Olympic Stadium; Attendance: 15,000; Referee: Gerd Hennig |

| 12 October 1974 9 | Borussia Mönchengladbach | 1–2 | Bayern Munich | Mönchengladbach |
| 15:30 CET | Wittkamp 36' | Report | Wunder 71'; Torstensson 73'; Müller (yellow card); Dürnberger (yellow card) | Stadium: Bökelbergstadion; Attendance: 34,500; Referee: Walter Engel |

| 19 October 1974 10 | Bayern Munich | 2–1 | Eintracht Frankfurt | Munich |
| 15:30 CET | Müller 60', 67' | Report | Hölzenbein 15' | Stadium: Olympic Stadium; Attendance: 60,000; Referee: Hans-Joachim Weyland |

| 2 November 1974 11 | Tennis Borussia Berlin | 2–2 | Bayern Munich | Berlin |
| 15:30 CET | Bittlmayer 31'; Eggert 87' | Report | Hoeneß 47'; Rummenigge 86' | Stadium: Olympic Stadium; Attendance: 14,837; Referee: Karl-Heinz Fork |

| 9 November 1974 12 | Bayern Munich | 2–5 | 1. FC Kaiserslautern | Munich |
| 15:30 CET | Wunder 27'; Müller 66' (pen.) | Report | Schwarz 35'; Riedl 47'; Sandberg 59'; Pirrung 81'; Toppmöller 88'; Bitz (yellow card) | Stadium: Olympic Stadium; Attendance: 25,000; Referee: Walter Eschweiler |

| 16 November 1974 13 | MSV Duisburg | 2–1 | Bayern Munich | Duisburg |
| 14:30 CET | Lehmann 16' (yellow card); Büssers 37' | Report | Müller 64'; Maier (yellow card) | Stadium: Wedaustadion; Attendance: 31,000; Referee: Walter Horstmann |

| 23 November 1974 14 | Bayern Munich | 2–2 | Rot-Weiß Essen | Munich |
| 15:30 CET | Müller 40', 85'; Wunder (yellow card) | Report | Burgsmüller 18'; Dörre 34'; Lorant (yellow card) | Stadium: Olympic Stadium; Attendance: 20,000; Referee: Klaus Ohmsen |

| 29 November 1974 15 | VfL Bochum | 3–0 | Bayern Munich | Bochum |
| 20:00 CET | Kaczor 7'; Balte 15' (pen.), 51' | Report | Schwarzenbeck (yellow card); Kapellmann (yellow card); Müller (yellow card) | Stadium: Stadion an der Castroper Straße; Attendance: 34,000; Referee: Peter Gabor |

| 7 December 1974 16 | Bayern Munich | 4–0 | Fortuna Düsseldorf | Munich |
| 15:30 CET | Müller 35', 38', 90'; Kapellmann 83' | Report | | Stadium: Olympic Stadium; Attendance: 13,000; Referee: Diedrich Basedow |

| 14 December 1974 17 | Hamburger SV | 1–0 | Bayern Munich | Hamburg |
| 15:30 CET | Hidien 43' (yellow card) | Report | | Stadium: Volksparkstadion; Attendance: 57,000; Referee: Rainer Waltert |

| 25 January 1975 18 | Bayern Munich | 2–3 | Kickers Offenbach | Munich |
| 15:30 CET | Müller 16'; Rummenigge 24' | Report | Ritschel 33' (pen.); Beckenbauer 59' (o.g.); Hickersberger 66'; Held (yellow card) | Stadium: Olympic Stadium; Attendance: 38,000; Referee: Jan Redelfs |

| 1 February 1975 19 | Hertha BSC | 4–1 | Bayern Munich | Berlin |
| 15:30 CET | Beckenbauer 9' (o.g.); Beer 47', 85'; Sidka 61'; Kliemann (penalty missed) 88'; Grau (yellow card) | Report | Rummenigge 12'; Förster (yellow card) | Stadium: Olympic Stadium; Attendance: 80,000; Referee: Hans-Joachim Weyland |

| 15 February 1975 20 | Bayern Munich | 1–1 | VfB Stuttgart | Munich |
| 15:30 CET | Rummenigge 57'; Schwarzenbeck (yellow card); Zobel (yellow card) | Report | Ohlicher 45'; Entenmann (yellow card); Stickel (yellow card) | Stadium: Olympic Stadium; Attendance: 63,000; Referee: Gerd Hennig |

| 22 February 1975 21 | 1. FC Köln | 1–0 | Bayern Munich | Cologne |
| 15:30 CET | Flohe 4' (pen.) | Report | Hansen (yellow card) | Stadium: Radrennbahn; Attendance: 28,000; Referee: Günter Linn |

| 1 March 1975 22 | Bayern Munich | 3–1 | Wuppertaler SV | Munich |
| 15:30 CET | Hoeneß 17'; Müller 26' (pen.); Schwarzenbeck 72' | Report | Dupke 81'; Miß (yellow card) | Stadium: Olympic Stadium; Attendance: 40,000; Referee: Gert Meuser |

| 8 March 1975 23 | FC Schalke 04 | 2–2 | Bayern Munich | Gelsenkirchen |
| 20:00 CET | Fischer 35'; Kremers 35' | Report | Müller 75', 83'; Schwarzenbeck (yellow card) | Stadium: Parkstadion; Attendance: 70,300; Referee: Peter Gabor |

| 22 March 1975 24 | Bayern Munich | 1–0 | Eintracht Braunschweig | Munich |
| 15:30 CET | Müller 48' | Report | Grzyb (yellow card) | Stadium: Olympic Stadium; Attendance: 32,000; Referee: Rainer Waltert |

| 27 March 1975 25 | Werder Bremen | 0–2 | Bayern Munich | Bremen |
| 15:30 CET | | Report | Roth 62'; Hoeneß 89'; Kapellmann (yellow card); Zobel (yellow card) | Stadium: Weserstadion; Attendance: 40,000; Referee: Walter Eschweiler |

| 13 April 1975 26 | Bayern Munich | 1–1 | Borussia Mönchengladbach | Munich |
| 15:30 CET | Müller 90' (pen.) | Report | Kulik 80' | Stadium: Olympic Stadium; Attendance: 72,000; Referee: Volker Roth |

| 5 April 1975 27 | Eintracht Frankfurt | 2–0 | Bayern Munich | Frankfurt |
| 15:30 CET | Körbel 40' (pen.); Nickel 84'; Trinklein (yellow card) | Report | Müller (yellow card); Kapellmann (yellow card) | Stadium: Waldstadion; Attendance: 58,400; Referee: Paul Kindervater |

| 19 April 1975 28 | Bayern Munich | 3–1 | Tennis Borussia Berlin | Munich |
| 15:30 CET | Müller 4', 18' (pen.); Andersson 8' | Report | Rumor 52'; Schulz (yellow card) | Stadium: Olympic Stadium; Attendance: 72,000; Referee: Wilfried Hilker |

| 3 May 1975 29 | 1. FC Kaiserslautern | 0–1 | Bayern Munich | Kaiserslautern |
| 15:30 CET | | Report | Hoeneß 74'; Kapellmann (yellow card); Dürnberger (yellow card) | Stadium: Betzenbergstadion; Attendance: 36,000; Referee: Gerd Hennig |

| 10 May 1975 30 | Bayern Munich | 2–1 | MSV Duisburg | Munich |
| 15:30 CET | Torstensson 31'; Müller 77' | Report | Bücker 82' | Stadium: Olympic Stadium; Attendance: 22,000; Referee: Hermann Schröder |

| 24 May 1975 31 | Rot-Weiß Essen | 2–2 | Bayern Munich | Essen |
| 15:30 CET | Wörmer 67'; Lippens 83' | Report | Roth 3', 57' | Stadium: Georg-Melches-Stadion; Attendance: 27,000; Referee: Diedrich Basedow |

| 31 May 1975 32 | Bayern Munich | 2–1 | VfL Bochum | Munich |
| 15:30 CET | Schwarzenbeck 54'; Müller 79'; Roth (yellow card) | Report | Holz 39' | Stadium: Olympic Stadium; Attendance: 25,000; Referee: Wolfgang Dittmer |

| 7 June 1975 33 | Fortuna Düsseldorf | 6–5 | Bayern Munich | Düsseldorf |
| 15:30 CET | Seel 35'; Kriegler 41'; Geye 56'; Baltes 59'; Brei 63'; Herzog 72' | Report | Kapellmann 29'; Müller 38', 40', 42'; Torstensson 69' | Stadium: Rheinstadion; Attendance: 32,000; Referee: Walter Horstmann |

=== DFB-Pokal ===
| 7 September 1974 1st Round | Bayern Munich | 3–2 | VfB Stuttgart | Munich |
| CET | Rummenigge 16'; Müller 76'; Hoeneß 80' | Report | Ettmayer 58'; Stickel 61' | Stadium: Olympic Stadium; Attendance: 20,000; Referee: Roth |

| 25 October 1974 2nd Round | Bayern Munich | 2–0 | Rot-Weiß Oberhausen | Munich |
| CET | Müller 55'; Hentschel 59' (o.g.) | Report | | Stadium: Olympic Stadium; Attendance: 3,500; Referee: Dettmer |

| 8 February 1975 3rd Round | Bayern Munich | 2–3 | MSV Duisburg | Munich |
| CET | Andersson 66'; Roth 75' | Report | Bruckmann 39'; Thies 55'; Schneider 61' | Stadium: Olympic Stadium; Attendance: 15,000; Referee: Walter Engel |

=== European Cup ===
| 23 October 1974 Round of 16 | Bayern Munich (West Germany) | 3–2 | (East Germany) 1. FC Magdeburg | Munich |
| 20:00 CET | Müller 51' (pen.), 63'; Wunder (yellow card) 68'; Enge 69' (o.g.) | Report | Hansen 1' (o.g.); Sparwasser 44'; Seguin (yellow card) 26' | Stadium: Olympic Stadium; Attendance: 63,349; Referee: Alberto Michelotti (Italy) |

| 6 November 1974 Round of 16 | 1. FC Magdeburg (East Germany) | 1–2 (3–5 agg.) | (West Germany) Bayern Munich | Magdeburg |
| 20:00 CET | Sparwasser 56' | Report | Müller 22', 55'; Maier (yellow card) 20'; Wunder (yellow card) 70' | Stadium: Ernst-Grube-Stadion; Attendance: 33,734; Referee: Erich Linemayr (Austria) |

| 5 March 1975 Quarter-finals | Bayern Munich (West Germany) | 2–0 | (Soviet Union) FC Ararat Yerevan | Munich |
| 20:00 CET | Hoeneß 78'; Torstensson 83' | Report | Sarkisian (yellow card) 26' | Stadium: Olympic Stadium; Attendance: 60,000; Referee: Milivoje Gugulovic (Serbia) |

| 5 March 1975 Quarter-finals | FC Ararat Yerevan (Soviet Union) | 1–0 (1–2 agg.) | (West Germany) Bayern Munich | Yerevan |
| 20:00 CET | Andreasyan 35'; Gevorkian (yellow card) 64' | Report | | Stadium: Hrazdan Stadium; Attendance: 70,000; Referee: Theodorus Boosten (Netherlands) |

| 9 April 1975 Semi-finals | Saint-Étienne (France) | 0–0 | (West Germany) Bayern Munich | Saint Étienne |
| 20:30 CET | | Report | Wunder (yellow card) 70' | Stadium: Stade Geoffroy-Guichard; Attendance: 35,210; Referee: Walter Hungerbühler (Switzerland) |

| 24 April 1975 Semi-finals | Bayern Munich (West Germany) | 2–0 (2–0 agg.) | (France) Saint-Étienne | Munich |
| 20:00 CET | Beckenbauer 2'; Dürnberger 69' (yellow card) 1' | Report | Piazza (yellow card) 1' | Stadium: Olympic Stadium; Attendance: 72,000; Referee: Charles Corver (Netherlands) |

| 28 May 1975 Final | Bayern Munich (West Germany) | 2–0 | (England) Leeds United | Paris |
| 20:15 CET | Schwarzenbeck (yellow card) 22'; Roth 71'; Müller 83' | Report | Reaney (yellow card) 11'; Hunter (yellow card) 80' | Stadium: Parc des Princes; Attendance: 50,000; Referee: Michel Kitabdjian (France) |
