= 1975 European Super Cup =

Bayern Munich	Dynamo Kyiv
(West Germany)	(Soviet Union)
0	3
- on aggregate

First leg
Bayern Munich	Dynamo Kyiv
0	1
- Date: 9 September 1975
- Venue: Olympiastadion, Munich
- Referee: Sergio Gonella (Italy)
- Attendance: 30,000

Second leg
Dynamo Kyiv	Bayern Munich
2	0
- Date: 6 October 1975
- Venue: Republican Stadium, Kyiv
- Referee: Doğan Babacan (Turkey)
- Attendance: 105,000

The 1975 European Super Cup was played on 9 September and 6 October 1975 between the 1974–75 European Cup winners Bayern Munich of West Germany, and the 1974–75 European Cup Winners' Cup winners Dynamo Kyiv of the Soviet Union. Dynamo won 3–0 on aggregate.

== Match details ==
=== First leg ===
9 September 1975

Bayern Munich (West Germany)	0–1	(Soviet Union) Dynamo Kyiv
	Report	Blokhin 66'

Olympiastadion, Munich
Attendance: 30,000
Referee: Sergio Gonella (Italy)

Bayern Munich	Dynamo Kyiv

GK	1	(West Germany) Sepp Maier
DF	8	(West Germany) Rainer Zobel
DF	2	(West Germany) Udo Horsmann
DF	3	(West Germany) Hans-Georg Schwarzenbeck
DF	5	(West Germany) Franz Beckenbauer (c)
MF	6	(West Germany) Sepp Weiß
MF	4	(West Germany) Bernd Dürnberger	(substituted off) 46'
MF	10	(West Germany) Karl-Heinz Rummenigge
FW	9	(West Germany) Gerd Müller
FW	7	(West Germany) Jupp Kapellmann
FW	11	(West Germany) Klaus Wunder
Substitutes:
MF		(West Germany) Franz Roth	(substituted on) 46'
Manager:
(West Germany) Dettmar Cramer

GK	1	(Soviet Union) Yevhen Rudakov
DF	6	(Soviet Union) Volodymyr Troshkin
DF	4	(Soviet Union) Mykhaylo Fomenko
DF	5	(Soviet Union) Stefan Reshko
DF	3	(Soviet Union) Valeriy Zuyev
MF	2	(Soviet Union) Anatoliy Konkov
MF	7	(Soviet Union) Oleksandr Damin
MF	10	(Soviet Union) Leonid Buryak
MF	9	(Soviet Union) Viktor Kolotov (c)
FW	8	(Soviet Union) Petro Slobodyan
FW	11	(Soviet Union) Oleh Blokhin
Substitutes:
Manager:
(Soviet Union) Valeriy Lobanovskyi

=== Second leg ===
6 October 1975

Dynamo Kyiv (Soviet Union)	2–0	(West Germany) Bayern Munich
Blokhin 40', 53'	Report

Republican Stadium, Kyiv
Attendance: 105,000
Referee: Doğan Babacan (Turkey)

Dynamo Kyiv	Bayern Munich

GK	1	(Soviet Union) Yevhen Rudakov
DF	6	(Soviet Union) Volodymyr Troshkin
DF	4	(Soviet Union) Mykhaylo Fomenko
DF	5	(Soviet Union) Stefan Reshko
DF	3	(Soviet Union) Valeriy Zuyev
MF	2	(Soviet Union) Anatoliy Konkov
MF	7	(Soviet Union) Volodymyr Muntyan
MF	9	(Soviet Union) Leonid Buryak
MF	10	(Soviet Union) Volodymyr Veremeyev
FW	8	(Soviet Union) Volodymyr Onyshchenko (c)
FW	11	(Soviet Union) Oleh Blokhin
Substitutes:
Manager:
(Soviet Union) Valeriy Lobanovskyi

GK	1	(West Germany) Sepp Maier
DF	7	(West Germany) Sepp Weiß
DF	2	(West Germany) Udo Horsmann
DF	3	(West Germany) Hans-Georg Schwarzenbeck
DF	5	(West Germany) Franz Beckenbauer (c)
MF	6	(West Germany) Franz Roth
MF	4	(West Germany) Bernd Dürnberger	(substituted off) 70'
MF	8	(West Germany) Ludwig Schuster	(substituted off) 78'
FW	11	(West Germany) Klaus Wunder
FW	9	(West Germany) Jupp Kapellmann
FW	10	(West Germany) Karl-Heinz Rummenigge
Substitutes:
DF	12	(Denmark) Johnny Hansen	(substituted on) 70'
FW	13	(Sweden) Conny Torstensson	(substituted on) 78'
Manager:
(West Germany) Dettmar Cramer

== See also ==
- 1975–76 European Cup
- 1975–76 European Cup Winners' Cup
- 1975–76 FC Bayern Munich season
- FC Bayern Munich in international football
- FC Dynamo Kyiv in European football
