= 1973–74 FC Bayern Munich season =

9th season of Bayern Munich in the Bundesliga

Bayern Munich
1973–74 season
- Chairman: Wilhelm Neudecker
- Manager: Udo Lattek
- Stadium: Olympiastadion
- Bundesliga: 1st (champions)
- DFB-Pokal: Semi-finals
- European Cup: Winners
- Top goalscorer: League: Gerd Müller (30); All: Gerd Müller (43)
Home colours	Away colours

The 1973–74 FC Bayern Munich season was the club's ninth season in Bundesliga.

== Review and events ==
Udo Lattek led Bayern to their fourth German championship and won the European Cup final against Atlético Madrid 4–0 after a replay.

== Squad ==
Note: Flags indicate national team as defined under FIFA eligibility rules; some limited exceptions apply. Players may hold more than one non-FIFA nationality.

No.	Pos.	Nation	Player
—	GK	GER	Sepp Maier
—	GK	GER	Walter Modick
—	GK	GER	Hugo Robl
—	DF	DEN	Johnny Hansen
—	DF	GER	Franz Beckenbauer
—	DF	GER	Hans-Georg Schwarzenbeck
—	DF	GER	Jupp Kapellmann
—	DF	GER	Gernot Rohr
—	DF	GER	Herbert Zimmermann
—	MF	GER	Franz Roth
—	MF	GER	Rainer Zobel
—	MF	GER	Bernd Dürnberger

No.	Pos.	Nation	Player
—	MF	SWE	Conny Torstensson
—	MF	GER	Bernd Gersdorff
—	MF	GER	Erwin Hadewicz
—	MF	GER	Georg Weiß
—	FW	GER	Gerd Müller
—	FW	GER	Uli Hoeneß
—	FW	GER	Wilhelm Hoffmann
—	FW	GER	Edgar Schneider
—	FW	DEN	Viggo Jensen
—	FW	YUG	Dušan Jovanović
—	FW	DEN	Torben Hansen
—	FW	GER	Norbert Ivangean

== Match results ==
=== Legend ===
Win Draw Loss

=== Bundesliga ===
11 August 1973 1	Bayern Munich	3–1	Fortuna Düsseldorf	Munich
15:30 CET	Hoeneß 25'; Zobel 81'; Beckenbauer 90'; Schwarzenbeck (yellow card)	Report	Seel 47'; Brei (yellow card)	Stadium: Olympic Stadium; Attendance: 45,000; Referee: Heinz Quindeau

18 August 1973 2	Fortuna Köln	0–3	Bayern Munich	Cologne
15:30 CET		Report	Breitner 32'; Hoeneß 52'; Dürnberger 81'	Stadium: Radrennbahn; Attendance: 24,000; Referee: Walter Horstmann

22 August 1973 3	Bayern Munich	2–0	Rot-Weiß Essen	Munich
20:00 CET	Müller 60' (pen.), 72'	Report		Stadium: Olympic Stadium; Attendance: 35,000; Referee: Jürgen Schumann

25 August 1973 4	Hertha BSC	2–2	Bayern Munich	Berlin
15:30 CET	Müller 26'; Hermandung 61'	Report	Müller 66'; Dürnberger 75'; Gersdorff (yellow card); Kapellmann (yellow card)	Stadium: Olympic Stadium; Attendance: 73,500; Referee: Hans-Joachim Weyland

1 September 1973 5	Bayern Munich	3–0	Wuppertaler SV	Munich
15:30 CET	Breitner 53'; Kapellmann 72'; Hoeneß 88'	Report		Stadium: Olympic Stadium; Attendance: 38,000; Referee: Peter Gabor

12 February 1973 6	FC Schalke 04	5–5	Bayern Munich	Gelsenkirchen
15:30 CET	Budde 11', 13'; Kremers 18'; Kremers 41' (pen.), 45' (pen.)	Report	Müller 38', 44' (pen.), 51', 68'; Dürnberger 64'	Stadium: Parkstadion; Attendance: 47,000; Referee: Herbert Lutz

15 September 1973 7	Bayern Munich	2–2	Werder Bremen	Munich
15:30 CET	Schwarzenbeck 37'; Müller (penalty missed) 30' 68'	Report	Røntved 22'; Görts 48'	Stadium: Olympic Stadium; Attendance: 32,000; Referee: Udo Zuchantke

22 September 1973 8	Hannover 96	3–1	Bayern Munich	Hannover
15:00 CET	Reimann 11' (pen.), 31', 42'; Siemensmeyer (yellow card); Denz (yellow card)	Report	Roth 65'; Zobel (yellow card); Rohr (yellow card)	Stadium: Niedersachsenstadion; Attendance: 60,000; Referee: Hans Hillebrand

29 September 1973 9	Bayern Munich	2–2	Eintracht Frankfurt	Munich
15:30 CET	Dürnberger 31', 32'; Breitner (yellow card); Kapellmann (yellow card)	Report	Nickel 34'; Hölzenbein 49'; Weidle (yellow card)	Stadium: Olympic Stadium; Attendance: 74,000; Referee: Gerd Siepe

17 October 1973 10	1. FC Köln	4–3	Bayern Munich	Cologne
15:30 CET	Overath 10', 42' (yellow card); Flohe 36' (yellow card); Löhr 60'	Report	Schwarzenbeck 21'; Hoeneß 34'; Roth 80'; Müller (yellow card)	Stadium: Radrennbahn; Attendance: 28,000; Referee: Jan Redelfs

17 October 1973 11	Bayern Munich	4–2	MSV Duisburg	Munich
15:30 CET	Schwarzenbeck 11'; Müller 42' (pen.), 64' (pen.); Hoeneß 86'	Report	Wunder 22'; Dietz 25'	Stadium: Olympic Stadium; Attendance: 15,000; Referee: Gert Meuser

20 October 1973 12	1. FC Kaiserslautern	7–4	Bayern Munich	Kaiserslautern
15:30 CET	Pirrung 43', 61', 73'; Toppmöller 58'; Diehl 84'; Laumen 87', 89'; Bitz (yellow card)	Report	Gersdorff 5', 12' (red card) 76'; Müller 36', 57'	Stadium: Betzenbergstadion; Attendance: 35,000; Referee: Horst Bonacker

27 October 1973 13	Bayern Munich	3–0	VfB Stuttgart	Munich
15:30 CET	Hoffmann 6'; Roth 45'; Hoeneß 89'; Zobel (yellow card)	Report	Brenninger (penalty missed) 22'; Handschuh (yellow card); Weidmann (yellow card); Zech (yellow card)	Stadium: Olympic Stadium; Attendance: 38,000; Referee: Kurt Tschenscher

3 November 1973 14	VfL Bochum	0–1	Bayern Munich	Bochum
15:30 CET	Walitza (yellow card); Versen (yellow card); Tenhagen (yellow card)	Report	Hoeneß 20'; Schwarzenbeck (yellow card); Hoffmann (yellow card)	Stadium: Stadion an der Castroper Straße; Attendance: 32,000; Referee: Jan Redelfs

10 November 1973 15	Bayern Munich	4–1	Hamburger SV	Munich
15:30 CET	Müller 32', 71', 83' (pen.); Dürnberger 85'; Schwarzenbeck (yellow card)	Report	Krause 14'	Stadium: Olympic Stadium; Attendance: 38,000; Referee: Günter Linn

17 November 1973 16	Kickers Offenbach	2–2	Bayern Munich	Offenbach
15:30 CET	Ritschel 48'; Kostedde 53'	Report	Roth 7'; Hoeneß 90' (yellow card); Zobel (yellow card)	Stadium: Stadion am Bieberer Berg; Attendance: 25,000; Referee: Gerhard Schulenburg

8 December 1973 17	Bayern Munich	4–3	Borussia Mönchengladbach	Munich
15:30 CET	Roth 4'; Müller 20' (yellow card); Zobel 23'; Hoeneß 64'	Report	Wimmer 6'; Jensen 18'; Bonhof 88'	Stadium: Olympic Stadium; Attendance: 65,000; Referee: Walter Engel

5 January 1974 18	Fortuna Düsseldorf	4–2	Bayern Munich	Düsseldorf
15:30 CET	Geye 36'; Köhnen 55', 60'; Herzog 89'	Report	Hoeneß 17'; Zobel 80'	Stadium: Rheinstadion; Attendance: 62,000; Referee: Walter Horstmann

12 January 1974 19	Bayern Munich	5–1	Fortuna Köln	Munich
15:30 CET	Müller 4', 42', 70'; Schwarzenbeck 32'; Dürnberger 47'	Report	Kucharski 17'	Stadium: Olympic Stadium; Attendance: 18,000; Referee: Wolfgang Dittmer

19 January 1974 20	Rot-Weiß Essen	0–1	Bayern Munich	Essen
15:30 CET		Report	Torstensson 68'	Stadium: Georg-Melches-Stadion; Attendance: 28,000; Referee: Herbert Kollmann

26 January 1974 21	Bayern Munich	3–1	Hertha BSC	Munich
15:30 CET	Beckenbauer 36'; Dürnberger 48'; Müller 66'	Report	Hermandung 69'	Stadium: Olympic Stadium; Attendance: 20,000; Referee: Hans Hillebrand

2 February 1974 22	Wuppertaler SV	1–4	Bayern Munich	Wuppertal
15:30 CET	Kohle 17' (pen.); Stöckl (yellow card)	Report	Hoeneß 32', 59'; Breitner 53'; Roth 83'; Müller (yellow card)	Stadium: Stadion am Zoo; Attendance: 28,000; Referee: Volker Roth

9 February 1974 23	Bayern Munich	5–1	FC Schalke 04	Munich
15:30 CET	Hoeneß 31'; Müller 34', 77', 88'; Roth 81'	Report	Kremers 90'; Kremers (yellow card)	Stadium: Olympic Stadium; Attendance: 68,000; Referee: Klaus Ohmsen

2 March 1974 24	Werder Bremen	1–1	Bayern Munich	Bremen
15:30 CET	Bracht 30'	Report	Hoeneß 74'; Schwarzenbeck (yellow card)	Stadium: Weserstadion; Attendance: 30,000; Referee: Paul Kindervater

9 March 1974 25	Bayern Munich	5–1	Hannover 96	Munich
15:30 CET	Breitner 12'; Roth (penalty missed) 39'; Beckenbauer 56'; Müller 75'; Hansen 76'; Hoeneß 77'	Report	Reimann 74'; Herbeck (yellow card); Denz (yellow card)	Stadium: Olympic Stadium; Attendance: 12,000; Referee: Günter Linn

16 March 1974 26	Eintracht Frankfurt	1–1	Bayern Munich	Frankfurt
15:30 CET	Grabowski 18' (pen.)	Report	Müller 79'	Stadium: Waldstadion; Attendance: 62,000; Referee: Hans-Joachim Weyland

23 March 1974 27	Bayern Munich	4–1	1. FC Köln	Munich
15:30 CET	Müller 6'; Hoffmann 29'; Breitner 56' (pen.); Kapellmann 78'	Report	Flohe 13'; Hein (yellow card)	Stadium: Olympic Stadium; Attendance: 55,000; Referee: Ferdinand Biwersi

30 March 1974 28	MSV Duisburg	0–4	Bayern Munich	Duisburg
15:30 CET		Report	Beckenbauer 22'; Müller 59'; Hoeneß 65'; Schwarzenbeck 84'	Stadium: Wedaustadion; Attendance: 34,000; Referee: Walter Engel

6 April 1974 29	Bayern Munich	1–1	1. FC Kaiserslautern	Munich
15:30 CET	Breitner (penalty missed) 65'; Schwarzenbeck 74'; Roth (yellow card)	Report	Sandberg 58'	Stadium: Olympic Stadium; Attendance: 35,000; Referee: Klaus Overberg

20 April 1974 30	VfB Stuttgart	1–1	Bayern Munich	Stuttgart
15:30 CET	Stickel 43'	Report	Müller 51' (yellow card); Beckenbauer (yellow card)	Stadium: Neckarstadion; Attendance: 72,000; Referee: Gerhard Schulenburg

27 April 1974 31	Bayern Munich	4–0	VfL Bochum	Munich
15:30 CET	Roth 4'; Müller 17'; Hoeneß 37'; Zobel 52'	Report		Stadium: Olympic Stadium; Attendance: 18,000; Referee: Jürgen Schumann

4 May 1974 32	Hamburger SV	0–5	Bayern Munich	Hamburg
15:30 CET		Report	Schwarzenbeck 18'; Breitner 31', 53'; Zobel 60'; Hoeneß 80' (pen.)	Stadium: Volksparkstadion; Attendance: 55,000; Referee: Horst Bonacker

11 May 1974 33	Bayern Munich	1–0	Kickers Offenbach	Munich
15:30 CET	Müller 75'	Report		Stadium: Olympic Stadium; Attendance: 22,000; Referee: Diedrich Basedow

18 May 1974 34	Borussia Mönchengladbach	5–0	Bayern Munich	Mönchengladbach
15:30 CET	Heynckes 30', 45'; Simonsen 34'; Bonhof 41'; Köstner 71'	Report		Stadium: Bökelbergstadion; Attendance: 34,500; Referee: Ferdinand Biwersi

=== DFB-Pokal ===
10 December 1973 1st Round	Bayern Munich	3–1	MSV Duisburg	Munich
14:30 CET	Hoeneß 27'; Müller 51' (pen.), 62'	Report	Seliger 88'; Lehmann (yellow card)	Stadium: Olympic Stadium; Attendance: 6,000; Referee: Heinz Nickel

15 December 1973 Round of 16	Werder Bremen	1–2	Bayern Munich	Bremen
15:30 CET	Görts 48'	Report	Schwarzenbeck 46' (yellow card); Torstensson 78'; Müller (yellow card)	Stadium: Weserstadion; Attendance: 28,000; Referee: Ferdinand Biwersi

16 February 1974 Quarterfinals	Bayern Munich	3–2	Hannover 96	Munich
15:30 CET	Müller 24', 35', 71' (yellow card)	Report	Siemensmeyer 75'; Kasperski 80'	Stadium: Olympic Stadium; Attendance: 10,000; Referee: Gerd Hennig

13 April 1974 Semifinals	Eintracht Frankfurt	3–2	Bayern Munich	Frankfurt
15:30 CET	Hölzenbein 49'; Grabowski (penalty missed) 64'; Rohrbach 68'; Kalb 90' (pen.)	Report	Hoeneß 60'; Breitner 62' (pen.)	Stadium: Waldstadion; Attendance: 62,000; Referee: Heinz Aldinger

=== European Cup ===
19 September 1973 1st Round	Bayern Munich (West Germany)	3–1	(Sweden) Åtvidabergs FF	Munich
20:00 CET	Müller 3', 72'; Olsson 68' (o.g.)	Report	Dürnberger 66' (o.g.)	Stadium: Olympic Stadium; Attendance: 28,279; Referee: Josef Placek (Czechoslovakia)

3 October 1973 1st Round	Åtvidabergs FF (Sweden)	3–1 (4–4 agg.) (3–4 p)	(West Germany) Bayern Munich	Åtvidaberg
19:30 CET	Torstensson 7', 72'; Wallinder 15' (yellow card)	Report	Hoeneß 60'	Stadium: Kopparvallen; Attendance: 9,251; Referee: John Keith Taylor (England)
	Penalties
	Torstensson (penalty scored); Almqvist (penalty scored); Magnusson (penalty scored); Karlsson (penalty missed); Franzén (penalty missed)		(penalty scored) Kapellmann; (penalty missed) Gersdorff; (penalty scored) Müller; (penalty scored) Hoeneß; (penalty scored) Beckenbauer

24 October 1973 Round of 16	Bayern Munich (West Germany)	4–3	(East Germany) Dynamo Dresden	Munich
20:00 CET	Hoffmann 17'; Dürnberger 26'; Roth 71'; Müller 83'	Report	Hansen 13' (o.g.) Sachse 36'; Heidler 42'	Stadium: Olympic Stadium; Attendance: 47,918; Referee: Robert Holley Davidson (Scotland)

7 November 1973 Round of 16	Dynamo Dresden (East Germany)	3–3 (7–6 agg.)	(West Germany) Bayern Munich	Dresden
17:30 CET	Wätzlich 42'; Schade 54'; Häfner 56'; Geyer (yellow card) 87'	Report	Hoeneß 10', 12'; Müller 60'; Hansen (yellow card) 72'; Dürnberger (yellow card) 89'	Stadium: Rudolf-Harbig-Stadion; Attendance: 35,334; Referee: Robert Wurtz (France)

5 March 1974 Quarter-finals	Bayern Munich (West Germany)	4–1	(Bulgaria) CSKA Sofia	Munich
20:00 CET	Torstensson 8', 88'; Beckenbauer 33' (yellow card) 20'; Müller 65'	Report	Mihailov 24'; Vasilev (yellow card) 66'; Kolev (yellow card) 66'; Iankov (red card) 88'	Stadium: Olympic Stadium; Attendance: 70,000; Referee: Sanchez Ibanez (Spain)

20 March 1974 Quarter-finals	CSKA Sofia (Bulgaria)	2–1 (3–5 agg.)	(West Germany) Bayern Munich	Sofia
18:30 CET	Kolev 28'; Vasilev (yellow card) 66'; Denev 48'; Nikodimov (yellow card) 59'	Report	Breitner 30' (pen.); Torstensson (yellow card) 59'	Stadium: Bulgarian Army Stadium; Attendance: 70,000; Referee: John Carpenter (Ireland)

10 April 1974 Semi-finals	Újpesti Dózsa (Hungary)	1–1	(West Germany) Bayern Munich	Budapest
18:00 CET	Fazekas 18'; Harsányi (yellow card) 27'	Report	Torstensson 38'; Zobel (yellow card) 30'	Stadium: Szusza Ferenc Stadium; Attendance: 78,426; Referee: Sergio Gonella (Italy)

24 April 1974 Semi-finals	Bayern Munich (West Germany)	3–0 (4–1 agg.)	(Hungary) Újpesti Dózsa	Munich
20:00 CET	Torstensson 33'; Horváth 70' (o.g.); Müller 81'	Report		Stadium: Olympic Stadium; Attendance: 72,628; Referee: Pavel Kazakov (Soviet Union)

15 May 1974 Final	Atlético Madrid (Spain)	1–1 (a.e.t.)	(West Germany) Bayern Munich	Brussels
20:15 CET	Aragonés 114'; Irureta (yellow card)	Report	Schwarzenbeck 120'	Stadium: Heysel Stadium; Attendance: 72,628; Referee: Vital Loraux (Belgium)

17 May 1974 Final replay	Atlético Madrid (Spain)	0–4	(West Germany) Bayern Munich	Brussels
20:00 CET	Eusebio (yellow card) 51'; Benegas (yellow card) 73'	Report	Hoeneß 28', 82'; Müller 56', 69' (yellow card) 29'	Stadium: Heysel Stadium; Attendance: 23,325; Referee: Alfred Delcourt (Belgium)
