= 1976 European Cup final =

- Match programme cover
- Event: 1975–76 European Cup
Bayern Munich	Saint-Étienne
(West Germany)	(France)
1	0
- Date: 12 May 1976
- Venue: Hampden Park, Glasgow
- Referee: Károly Palotai (Hungary)
- Attendance: 54,864

The 1976 European Cup final was a football match held at Hampden Park, Glasgow, on 12 May 1976, that saw Bayern Munich of West Germany defeat Saint-Étienne of France 1–0. This was the third consecutive European Cup title for Bayern, making them the third club to achieve this feat, following Real Madrid and Ajax.

== Route to the final ==
(West Germany) Bayern Munich				Round	(France) Saint-Étienne			
Opponent	Agg.	1st leg	2nd leg		Opponent	Agg.	1st leg	2nd leg
(Luxembourg) Jeunesse Esch	8–1	5–0 (A)	3–1 (H)	First round	(Denmark) Kjøbenhavns Boldklub	5–1	2–0 (A)	3–1 (H)
(Sweden) Malmö FF	2–1	0–1 (A)	2–0 (H)	Second round	(Scotland) Rangers	4–1	2–0 (H)	2–1 (A)
(Portugal) Benfica	5–1	0–0 (A)	5–1 (H)	Quarter-finals	(Soviet Union) Dynamo Kyiv	3–2	0–2 (A)	3–0 (H)
(Spain) Real Madrid	3–1	1–1 (A)	2–0 (H)	Semi-finals	(Netherlands) PSV Eindhoven	1–0	1–0 (H)	0–0 (A)

== Match ==
=== Summary ===
The match took place at Hampden Park in Glasgow, a city that already had seen Saint-Étienne defeat local team Rangers during the competition. Les Verts were playing against Bayern Munich, a team hoping to win a third consecutive European Cup.

The game began with Gerd Müller finding the back of the net after Bernd Dürnberger won the ball in his own half and went on a 50-metre solo run; however, Müller's effort was disallowed for offside by the Hungarian referee Károly Palotai. In the 37th minute, Uli Hoeneß took a shot, but it did not worry goalkeeper Ivan Ćurković. Saint-Étienne had plenty of chances to score, though; at the 34th minute Dominique Bathenay's shot hit the crossbar, with Bayern's keeper Sepp Maier beaten. Five minutes later, Jacques Santini connected with a cross from Christian Sarramagna, but his header hit the crossbar too. After the final, French fans called Hampden Park's goalposts "les poteaux carrés" (English: the square posts).

After the start of the second half, Bayern were more confident. In the 57th minute, Franz Beckenbauer passed to Gerd Müller, who was tackled by Osvaldo Piazza and the referee gave a free-kick to the German team from 20 metres out, just left of the penalty arc. Franz Beckenbauer tipped the ball to Roth on his right who scored half high into the left side of the goal. After this, les Verts tried everything. Manager Robert Herbin chose to substitute Sarramagna for Dominique Rocheteau, but to no avail.

At the end of the match, Saint-Étienne's players were crying, because they felt that they had been unlucky, but their supporters were congratulating them, and their return in France was heroic, even though they were defeated.

=== Details ===
12 May 1976
20:15 BST

Bayern Munich (West Germany)	1–0	(France) Saint-Étienne
Roth 57'	Report

Hampden Park, Glasgow
Attendance: 54,864
Referee: Károly Palotai (Hungary)

Bayern Munich	Saint-Étienne

GK	1	(West Germany) Sepp Maier
DF	2	(Denmark) Johnny Hansen
DF	3	(West Germany) Udo Horsmann
DF	4	(West Germany) Hans-Georg Schwarzenbeck
DF	5	(West Germany) Franz Beckenbauer (c)
MF	6	(West Germany) Franz Roth
FW	7	(West Germany) Karl-Heinz Rummenigge
MF	8	(West Germany) Bernd Dürnberger
FW	9	(West Germany) Gerd Müller
FW	10	(West Germany) Uli Hoeneß
MF	11	(West Germany) Jupp Kapellmann
Substitutes:
GK		(West Germany) Hugo Robl
Manager:
(West Germany) Dettmar Cramer

GK	1	(Socialist Federal Republic of Yugoslavia) Ivan Ćurković
DF	2	(France) Gérard Janvion
DF	3	(France) Pierre Repellini
DF	4	(Argentina) Osvaldo Piazza
DF	5	(France) Christian Lopez
MF	6	(France) Dominique Bathenay
MF	7	(France) Patrick Revelli
MF	8	(France) Jean-Michel Larqué (c)
FW	9	(France) Hervé Revelli
MF	10	(France) Jacques Santini
FW	11	(France) Christian Sarramagna	(substituted off) 83'
Substitutes:
FW	13	(France) Dominique Rocheteau	(substituted on) 83'
GK	16	(France) Jean Castaneda
Manager:
(France) Robert Herbin

== See also ==
- 1975–76 FC Bayern Munich season
- 1976 European Cup Winners' Cup final
- 1976 European Super Cup
- 1976 UEFA Cup final
- FC Bayern Munich in international football
