= Letheren =

Letheren is a surname. Notable people with the surname include:

- Glan Letheren (1956–2024), Welsh footballer
- Kyle Letheren (born 1987), Welsh footballer
- Mark Letheren (born 1971), English actor
