= Dušan Jovanović (footballer, born 1946) =

Serbian footballer (born 1946)

Dušan Jovanović Душан Јовановић
Personal information
- Full name: Dušan Jovanović
- Date of birth: 4 November 1946
- Place of birth: Belgrade, Serbia, Yugoslavia
- Date of death: 1 October 2013 (aged 66)
- Height: 1.81 m (5 ft 11 in)
- Position: Forward

Senior career*
Years	Team	Apps	(Gls)
1963–1969	Željezničar		
1971–1973	OFK Beograd		
1973	Bayern Munich	2	(0)
1974	Röchling Völklingen		
1974–76	FK Sarajevo		
- * Club domestic league appearances and goals

Dušan Jovanović (Serbian Cyrillic: Душан Јовановић; 4 November 1946 – 1 October 2013) was a Serbian footballer. He was known for having a brief stint with Bayern Munich in 1973 as well as playing for FK Željezničar Sarajevo in his native Yugoslavia throughout the 1960s.

== Career ==
In 1963, at the age of 16, Jovanović was a member of FK Željezničar Sarajevo, for whom he had played in the Yugoslav First League until 1967 and again in the 1968–69 season. With the club, he also took part in the 1965–66 Intertoto Cup where the club leading the group stage with Jovanović played in all three games. Despite this, the club was taken out of the competition by the Yugoslav FA and runners-up SC Leipzig advanced to the quarterfinals. In the competition for the revived Mitropa Cup, he made two appearances on 4 December 1968 in a 1–0 victory against Honvéd Budapest and the semi-final first leg against TJ Sklo Union Teplice on 21 May 1969, which ended in a 1–1 draw. From 1971 to 1973, he played for league rivals OFK Belgrade, with whom he twice finished third in the championship.

With his talents impressing clubs abroad, Jovanović was a member of the Bayern Munich squad during the first half of the 1973–74 season. He was one of three foreign players at the beginning of the season, along with the Danes Johnny Hansen and Viggo Jensen, two of whom were allowed to play in a competitive match at the same time. After the signing of Swedish forward Conny Torstensson, who had impressed in the first-round duel in the 1973–74 European Cup against his former club Åtvidabergs FF, which was only decided on penalties, in mid-November 1973 after the end of the Allsvenskan season, Jovanović's chances of playing diminished. With the exception of two appearances in friendly matches, he was denied a competitive match for the Bavarians. At the turn of 1974, he therefore went to the Regionalliga Southwest club SV Röchling Völklingen. He then returned to Yugoslavia, where he joined the First League club FK Sarajevo and played for them from 1974 to 1976 before retiring.
