= Glan Letheren =

Welsh footballer (1956–2024)

Personal information
- Date of birth: 1 May 1956
- Place of birth: Dafen, Carmarthenshire, Wales
- Date of death: 6 June 2024 (aged 68)
- Position: Goalkeeper

Youth career
- –1973: Leeds United

Senior career*
Years	Team	Apps	(Gls)
1973–1977	Leeds United	1	(0)
1976–1977	→ Scunthorpe United (loan)	27	(0)
1977–1979	Chesterfield	63	(0)
1979–1981	Swansea City	21	(0)
1981–1982	Blackpool	0	(0)
1982	Oxford City		
1982–1983	Scarborough		
1983–1984	Bangor City		
1984–1986	Llanelli Town		
- * Club domestic league appearances and goals

Glan Letheren (1 May 1956 – 6 June 2024) was a Welsh professional footballer who played in the Football League as a goalkeeper.

== Club career ==
Hailing from Dafen, Carmarthenshire, Letheren started his career at Leeds United. On 24 October 1973, he made his senior debut in a 0–0 draw against Hibernian in the UEFA Cup. Afterwards, he was on the bench during the 1975 European Cup final against Bayern Munich.

He later played for Scunthorpe United, Chesterfield, Swansea City, Blackpool, Oxford City, Scarborough, Bangor City and Llanelli Town.

== International career ==
Letheren represented Wales under-23 team in two matches. Despite being called up to the Wales senior team, he never achieved a full international cap.

== Coaching career ==
Following his retirement from playing, Letheren transitioned into coaching and scouting roles, contributing his goalkeeping expertise to teams such as Leeds United, Swansea City, Exeter City, Chester City, Leicester City and the Football Association of Wales, as well as being the manager of the Wales women's national team. Additionally, he ventured abroad to work in Australia, Haiti, and St. Lucia.

== Outside football ==
Letheren was also a successful cricketer in the South Wales Cricket Association, playing mainly for Dafen Welfare CC, as a medium pace bowler and middle order batsman.

== Personal life ==
Letheren's son Kyle also became a professional football goalkeeper. He was also called up and remained uncapped by Wales at senior level.

Letheren died on 6 June 2024, aged 68. He had been diagnosed with primary peritoneal carcinoma in May 2023.
