= Gerd Schwickert =

German footballer (1949–2022)

Personal information
- Date of birth: 14 August 1949
- Date of death: 22 November 2022 (aged 73)
- Position: Midfielder

Senior career*
Years	Team	Apps	(Gls)
1973–1974	SV Alsenborn		
1974–1976	Mainz 05		
1976–1979	FC Homburg		
1979–1983	SV Neckargerach		
1983–1986	FC Homburg		

Managerial career
- 1987: FC Homburg
- 1987: Borussia Neunkirchen
- 1987–1988: FC Homburg
- 1989: FC Homburg (caretaker)
- 1990–1992: FC Homburg
- 1993–1994: Eintracht Trier
- 1995–1996: Borussia Neunkirchen
- 1996–1998: SC Freiburg (scout)
- 1998–1999: FC Augsburg
- 2000–2002: SV Wehen
- 2003–2004: SV Elversberg
- 2007–2017: SC Freiburg (scout)
- * Club domestic league appearances and goals

Gerd Schwickert (14 August 1949 – 22 November 2022) was a German football player and manager who played as a midfielder.
