= Herbert Meyer (footballer) =

German footballer

Personal information
- Date of birth: 12 June 1948 (age 78)
- Place of birth: Bremen, Germany
- Height: 1.78 m (5 ft 10 in)
- Position: Defender

Youth career
- –1968: Werder Bremen

Senior career*
| Years | Team | Apps | (Gls) |
| 1968–1971 | Werder Bremen | 32 | (0) |
| 1971–1974 | Kickers Offenbach | 89 | (3) |
| 1974–1976 | Hannover 96 | 55 | (0) |
| 1976–1980 | Borussia Dortmund | 79 | (2) |
| Total | | 255 | (5) |
- * Club domestic league appearances and goals

Herbert Meyer (born 12 June 1948, in Bremen) is a German former footballer who made a total of 201 appearances in the Bundesliga during his playing career.
