= Uwe Bracht =

German footballer (1953–2016)

Personal information
- Date of birth: 10 July 1953
- Place of birth: Bremen, Germany
- Date of death: 11 November 2016 (aged 63)
- Height: 1.72 m (5 ft 8 in)
- Position: Midfielder

Youth career
- -1969: ATS Buntentor
- 1969-1971: Werder Bremen

Senior career*
Years	Team	Apps	(Gls)
1971–1984	Werder Bremen	309	(26)
1986–1988	VfB Oldenburg		
1988–1989	Bremer SV		
- * Club domestic league appearances and goals

Uwe Bracht (10 July 1953 – 11 November 2016) was a German professional footballer who played as a midfielder. He spent eleven seasons in the Bundesliga with SV Werder Bremen.

Born in Bremen, Bracht began playing professional football with Werder. He flourished under manager Otto Rehhagel, helping the club to a runner's-up finish during the 1982–83 season. Bracht suffered a serious achilles tendon injury in late 1983, and would be unable to play football for a year.

Bracht died in 2016 at the age of 63.

== Honours ==
Werder Bremen

- Bundesliga runner-up: 1982–83
