= Ludwig Schuster =

German footballer

Personal information
- Date of birth: March 30, 1951 (age 75)
- Place of birth: Ludwigshafen, West Germany
- Position: Midfielder

Youth career
- –1970: Südwest Ludwigshafen

Senior career*
Years	Team	Apps	(Gls)
1970–1971	1. FC Nürnberg	5	(0)
1971–1975	Bayern Hof		
1975–1976	Bayern Munich	7	(0)
1976–1978	1. FC Saarbrücken	40	(3)
1978–1981	Fortuna Köln	62	(13)
1981–1982	FC Biel-Bienne		

International career
1968–1970	West Germany Youth	8	(0)
Medal record
Bayern Munich
Runner-up	European Super Cup	1975
Winner	European Cup	1976
- * Club domestic league appearances and goals

Ludwig Schuster (born March 30, 1951) is a German former football midfielder who played for 1. FC Nürnberg, FC Bayern Hof, FC Bayern Munich, 1. FC Saarbrücken and Fortuna Köln.

== Honours ==
- Regionalliga Süd champion: 1971, with 1. FC Nürnberg
- Regionalliga Süd runner-up: 1972, with FC Bayern Hof
- Bundesliga third place: 1976, with FC Bayern Munich
- European Cup winner: 1976, with FC Bayern Munich
- Intercontinental Cup winner: 1976 (did not play), with FC Bayern Munich
