= Reinhard Meier =

German footballer (1946–2020)

Personal information
- Date of birth: 11 March 1946
- Place of birth: Wiesbaden, Germany
- Date of death: 25 November 2020 (aged 74)
- Height: 1.74 m (5 ft 8 1/2 in)
- Position: Defender

Senior career*
Years	Team	Apps	(Gls)
1969–1973	SV Alsenborn		
1973–1981	1. FC Kaiserslautern	184	(21)
- * Club domestic league appearances and goals

Reinhard Meier (11 March 1946 – 25 November 2020) was a German football player. He spent eight seasons in the Bundesliga with 1. FC Kaiserslautern.

== Honours ==
- DFB-Pokal finalist: 1975–76, 1980–81
- Bundesliga 3rd place: 1978–79, 1979–80
