= Rainer Künkel =

German footballer

Personal information
- Date of birth: 9 April 1950 (age 76)
- Place of birth: Breidenbach, West Germany
- Position: Forward

Youth career
- –1966: FV 1920 Wiesenbach
- 1966–1970: FV 09 Breidenbach

Senior career*
Years	Team	Apps	(Gls)
1970–1974	Hessen Kassel	107	(32)
1974–1976	SV Darmstadt 98	41	(29)
1976–1978	Bayern Munich	33	(6)
1978–1980	1. FC Saarbrücken	64	(33)
1980–1984	Viktoria Köln		
1984–1985	SC 1919 Gladenbach		
1985–1988	VfL Marburg		
1988–1989	VfL 1911 Biedenkopf		
1989–1991	SV 1924 Allendorf		
1991–1992	VfL Marburg		
1992–1993	VfL 1911 Biedenkopf		
- * Club domestic league appearances and goals

Rainer Künkel (born 9 April 1950 in Breidenbach, Hesse) is a German former footballer.
