= Werner Schneider =

German footballer

Personal information
- Date of birth: July 26, 1954 (age 72)
- Positions: Defender; midfielder

Youth career
- Viktoria Buchholz
- Eintracht Duisburg 1848

Senior career*
Years	Team	Apps	(Gls)
1971–1977	MSV Duisburg	157	(7)
1977–1981	Borussia Dortmund	122	(7)
1981–1983	Hertha BSC	60	(4)
1983–	Viktoria Goch		
- * Club domestic league appearances and goals

Werner Schneider (born July 26, 1954) is a German former football player. He spent 12 seasons in the Bundesliga with MSV Duisburg, Borussia Dortmund and Hertha BSC.

== Honours ==
- DFB-Pokal finalist: 1975.
