= Klaus Wunder =

German footballer (1950–2024)

Personal information
- Date of birth: 13 September 1950
- Place of birth: Erfurt, Thuringia, East Germany
- Date of death: 16 January 2024 (aged 73)
- Place of death: Hemmingen
- Height: 1.76 m (5 ft 9 in)
- Position: Striker

Senior career*
Years	Team	Apps	(Gls)
1969–1971	Arminia Hannover		
1970–1974	MSV Duisburg	94	(32)
1974–1976	Bayern Munich	43	(7)
1976–1978	Hannover 96	75	(33)
1978–1980	Werder Bremen	56	(12)

International career
1970–1972	West Germany Amateur	20	(6)
1972–1973	West Germany U23	5	(4)
1972–1974	West Germany B	3	(0)
1973	West Germany	1	(0)
- * Club domestic league appearances and goals

Klaus Wunder (13 September 1950 – 16 January 2024) was a German professional footballer who played as a striker. For Bayern Munich, he was part of the club's European Cup victory in 1974–75. He earned one cap for the Germany national team and also represented West Germany at the 1972 Summer Olympics. He was given the nickname "Caesar".

== Biography ==
Wunder was born in Erfurt, East Germany but his parents fled to West Germany when he was four years old.

He started playing football for Arminia Hannover before joining MSV Duisburg where he made his Bundesliga debut in 1971. In 1972 he represented West Germany at the Olympic games in Munich. In September 1973, he received his only cap for Germany as a substitute for Jürgen Grabowski in a 1–0 win against the Soviet Union. In 1974, he signed for champions Bayern Munich for a club record transfer fee of between 400,000 and 700,000 Deutsche Marks. In his one season at Bayern, he won the European Cup, coming on as a substitute for the seriously injured Uli Hoeness in the final against Leeds United. In December 1975 he moved to Hannover 96 and later played for Werder Bremen. After his retirement from football, he ran a tennis and squash club in Hemmingen.

Wunder died on 16 January 2024, at the age of 73.

== Honours ==
Bayern Munich

- European Cup: 1974–75
