= Björn Andersson (footballer, born 1951) =

Swedish footballer

Personal information
- Full name: Björn Olaf Bertil Andersson
- Date of birth: 20 July 1951 (age 75)
- Place of birth: Perstorp, Sweden
- Height: 1.77 m (5 ft 10 in)
- Position: Defender

Team information
- Current team: IS Halmia (youth coordinator)

Senior career*
Years	Team	Apps	(Gls)
1970–1974	Östers IF	101	(1)
1974–1977	FC Bayern Munich	47	(1)
1977–1979	Östers IF	40	(1)
1980–1981	Markaryds IF	34	(0)
1982–1984	Vallentuna BK		

International career
1968–1969	Sweden U19	8	(0)
1970–1973	Sweden U21	14	(0)
1972–1977	Sweden	28	(1)

Managerial career
- 1980–1981: Markaryds IF
- 1982–1983: Vallentuna BK
- 1995–2009: FC Bayern Munich (youth)
- 2011–2013: IFK Hässleholm (assistant)
- 2014–: IS Halmia (youth coordinator)
- * Club domestic league appearances and goals

Björn Olaf Bertil Andersson (born 20 July 1951) is a Swedish former professional footballer who played as a defender. He is best remembered for representing Bayern Munich and was part of their European Cup victory in 1975. A full international between 1972 and 1977, he won 28 caps and scored one goal for the Sweden men's national football team and represented his country at the 1974 FIFA World Cup.

He is currently a youth coordinator at IS Halmia.

== Career statistics ==
=== International ===
Appearances and goals by national team and year

National team	Year	Apps	Goals
Sweden	1972	2	0
Sweden	1973	5	0
Sweden	1974	10	0
Sweden	1975	2	0
Sweden	1976	6	1
Sweden	1977	3	0
Total		28	1

Scores and results list Sweden's goal tally first, score column indicates score after each Andersson goal.

List of international goals scored by Björn Andersson
No.	Date	Venue	Opponent	Score	Result	Competition	Ref.
1	16 June 1976	Råsunda Stadium, Solna, Sweden	Norway	1–0	2–0	1978 FIFA World Cup qualification	

== Honours ==
Bayern Munich

- European Cup: 1974–75, 1975–76
- Intercontinental Cup: 1976

Östers IF

- Allsvenskan: 1978
