= Udo Horsmann =

German footballer

Personal information
- Date of birth: 30 March 1952 (age 74)
- Place of birth: Beckum, West Germany
- Position: Defender

Senior career*
Years	Team	Apps	(Gls)
1973–1975	SpVgg Beckum		
1975–1983	Bayern Munich	229	(20)
1983–1984	Rennes	32	(0)
1984–1985	1. FC Nürnberg	13	(0)
1985–1986	1860 Munich	34	(6)
Total		308	(26)
- * Club domestic league appearances and goals

Udo Horsmann (born 30 March 1952) is a German former footballer who played as a defender for Bayern Munich and was part of their European Cup winning team in 1976.

== Honours ==
Bayern Munich

- European Cup: 1975–76
- European Cup finalist: 1981–82
- Intercontinental Cup: 1976
- Bundesliga: 1979–80, 1980–81
- DFB-Pokal: 1981–82
