= Sepp Weiß =

German footballer

Personal information
- Full name: Josef Weiß
- Date of birth: 13 March 1952 (age 74)
- Place of birth: Freising, West Germany
- Height: 1.80 m (5 ft 11 in)
- Position: Midfielder

Youth career
- 1960–1968: TSV 1868 Nandlstadt
- 1968–1971: Bayern Munich

Senior career*
Years	Team	Apps	(Gls)
1971–1974	Bayern Munich (A)		
1974–1978	Bayern Munich	37	(0)
1978–1980	Würzburger FV	74	(1)
1980–1981	SpVgg Bayreuth	30	(0)
1981–1982	FC Vilshofen		

Managerial career
- 1990–1991: SpVgg Landshut
- * Club domestic league appearances and goals

Sepp Weiss (born 13 March 1952) is a German footballer who played for Bayern Munich and was part of their European Cup victory in 1975.

Weiss made 37 appearances in the Bundesliga for Bayern Munich before moving to Würzburger FV and SpVgg Bayreuth where he would make 104 appearances in the 2. Bundesliga.

== Honours ==
=== Club ===
Bayern Munich

- European Cup: 1974–75
- Intercontinental Cup: 1976
