= Franz Roth =

German footballer

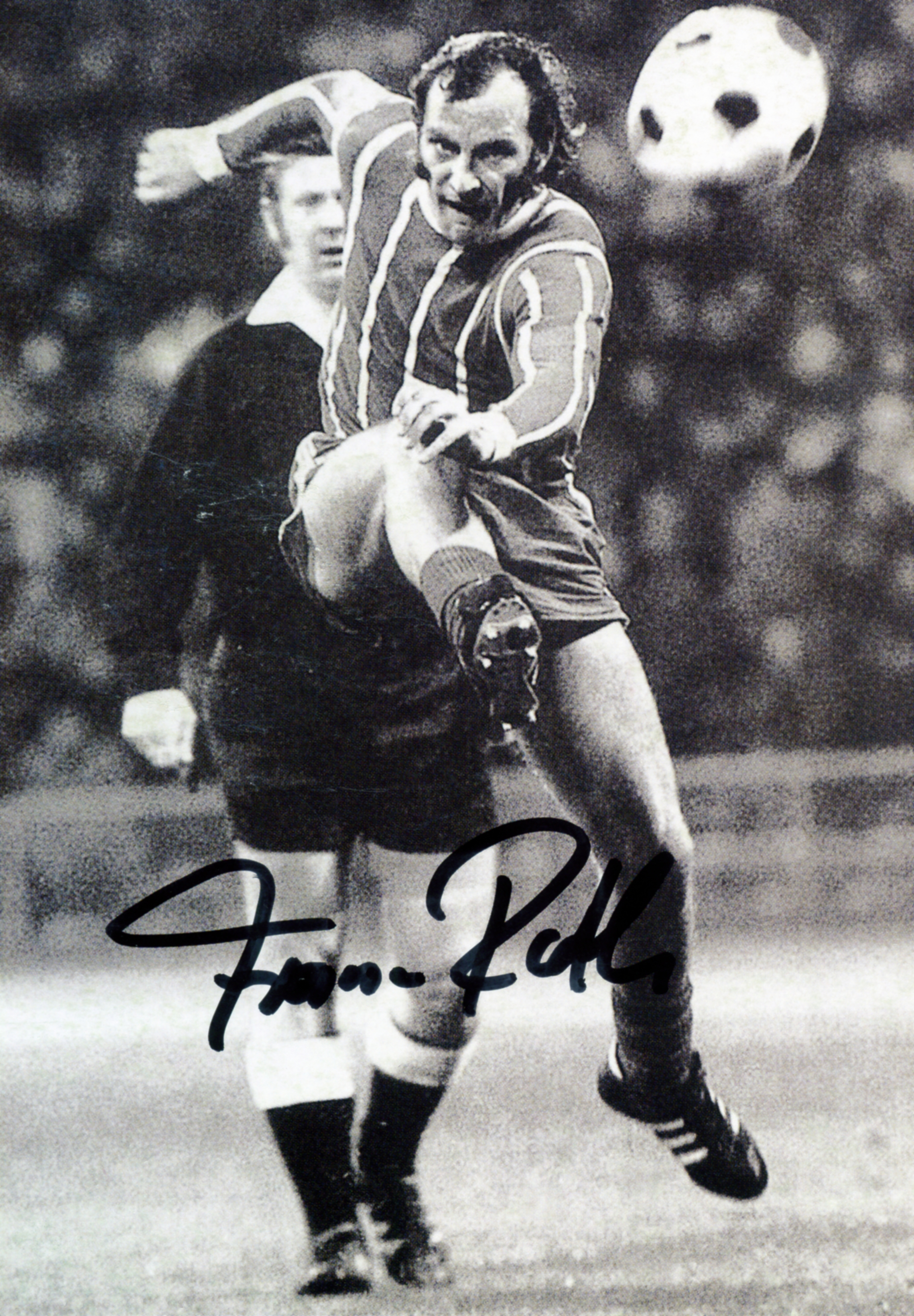
- Bulle Roth playing for Bayern.

Personal information
- Date of birth: 27 April 1946 (age 80)
- Place of birth: Memmingen, Germany
- Height: 1.79 m (5 ft 10 in)
- Position: Midfielder

Youth career
- –1964: TSV Bertoldshofen
- 1964–1966: SpVgg Kaufbeuren

Senior career*
Years	Team	Apps	(Gls)
1966–1978	FC Bayern Munich	322	(72)
1978–1979	SV Casino Salzburg	31	(1)
1980	SV Sandhausen	8	(0)
1980–1985	TSV Mindelheim		
Total		371	(73)

International career
1967–1970	West Germany	4	(0)
1969	West Germany U-23	1	(0)
- * Club domestic league appearances and goals

Franz "Bulle" Roth (born 27 April 1946 in Memmingen) is a former German footballer. He earned four caps for the Germany national football team and was nicknamed "the Bull" due to his physical playing style.

== Career ==
Roth was a big game player and had a knack of scoring important goals in massive games for Bayern Munich. He scored the only goal of the 1967 European Cup Winners' Cup Final against Rangers in extra time, which was enough to give Bayern victory, and their first triumph in European competition. He opened the scoring in the 1975 European Cup Final win over Leeds United, a game in which Roth won the midfield battle against Billy Bremner. Roth scored for the third time in the final of a European competition, with his 57th-minute strike against AS Saint-Étienne 1976 European Cup Final enough to give Bayern a 1–0 victory, and retain the European Cup for the third straight season.

On the domestic scene he scored 72 goals in 322 West German top-flight matches. With Roth FC Bayern won 4 Bundesliga titles.

Roth is one of the most decorated players in Bayern's history and has been voted into their Hall of Fame.

== Honours ==
- Bundesliga: 1968–69, 1971–72, 1972–73, 1973–74
- DFB-Pokal: 1965–66, 1966–67, 1968–69, 1970–71
- European Cup: 1973–74, 1974–75, 1975–76
- UEFA Cup Winners' Cup: 1966–67
- Intercontinental Cup: 1976
