= Dettmar Cramer =

German football manager (1925–2015)

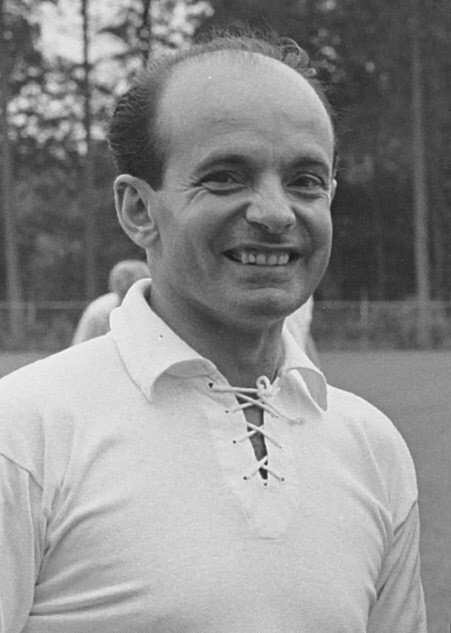
- Cramer in 1963

Personal information
- Date of birth: 4 April 1925
- Place of birth: Dortmund, Germany
- Date of death: 17 September 2015 (aged 90)
- Place of death: Reit im Winkl, Germany

Managerial career
- Years: Team
- 1960–1963: Japan (technical advisor)
- 1964–1966: West Germany (assistant)
- 1971–1974: Egypt
- 1974: United States
- 1974: Hertha BSC
- 1975–1977: Bayern Munich
- 1977–1978: Eintracht Frankfurt
- 1978–1981: Al-Ittihad
- 1981–1982: Aris Thessaloniki
- 1982–1985: Bayer Leverkusen
- 1984–1985: Malaysia
- 1991–1992: South Korea U-23 (technical advisor)
- 1997: Thailand
Medal record
Men's football
Representing Egypt (as manager)
African Games
Bronze medal – third place	1973
Africa Cup of Nations
Third place	1974

Dettmar Cramer (4 April 1925 – 17 September 2015) was a German football manager who led Bayern Munich to the 1975 and 1976 European Cups. He was born in Dortmund. Cramer is commonly considered to be the father of modern football in Japan and was a member of the Order of the Sacred Treasure, 3rd Class. He coached the Egypt national football team and also briefly coached the United States national team.

== Career ==
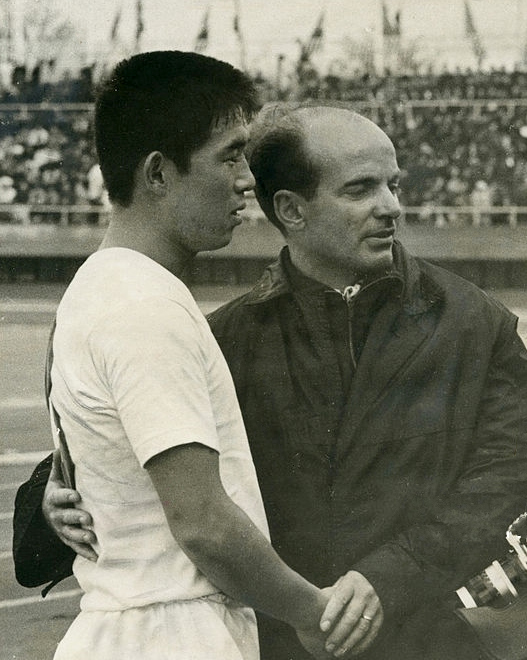
Ryuichi Sugiyama and Cramer at the 1964 Olympics

Known as the "Football Professor", because of his attention to detail and also as "Napoleon" because of his diminutive 1.61 meter stature, Cramer began his career at Viktoria Dortmund and Germania Wiesbaden. The beginning of his managerial career led him to clubs such as Teutonia Lippstadt, VfL Geseke, FC Paderborn, and TuS Eving-Lindenhorst. At the turn of the year 1948–49, Cramer found himself in the service of the German Football Association (DFB) for the first time. Until 1963 he served with the designation as Head Coach for Western Germany under the DFB in Duisburg.

Little known, Cramer attempted to make the jump into a career in journalism at this point. He became lead editor for sports for West German television station ZDF. Feeling largely isolated from the football world, Cramer decided to call it quits after only six months on the job. Afterward he was sent by the DFB to Japan to serve as a football instructor.

In order to strengthen its national team ahead of the Tokyo Olympic Games four years later, the Japan Football Association had the idea in 1960 of bringing in a foreign professional coach. Cramer was ultimately selected for this role. Through Cramer's coaching and leadership, and the efforts of his players, the Japan national team achieved a surprise upset over Argentina at the Tokyo Olympics. The significance of this result was not lost on Cramer who saw it as a confirmation that Japanese football was vastly improving. Cramer's efforts were not limited to the national team, as he also formulated and implemented policies for general development. The foundation of a first national league, the training of other coaches, and the strengthening of the national team would all contribute to Japan's success at the Mexico City Olympics four years later, where Japan would take home the bronze medal.

On 1 January 1964, Cramer returned to West Germany to serve as an assistant to West Germany national coach Helmut Schön. In this capacity he was a part of the coaching staff at the World Cup in 1966, where West Germany lost in the final to England. His talents were highly regarded by FIFA (Federation Internationale de Football Association), which contracted him as a coach from 1967 to 1974 and sent him on a tour of the globe. During this time, Cramer also ran the 1st FIFA Coaching Course in Japan in 1969, and sowed the seeds for a coach training structure in Japan. Additionally, on 1 August 1974, Cramer was selected by the United States Soccer Federation to become the head coach of the United States national team.

During his time in national team service, Cramer received numerous coaching offers from West German clubs in the Bundesliga, although he consistently turned them down. Then, on 16 January 1975, he took over the reins as manager of West German giants FC Bayern Munich. At the beginning, Cramer faced heavy criticism in Munich, mostly because of his passive management style. With rumors of a sacking swirling around Cramer, he was strongly backed by team captain Franz Beckenbauer, who felt indebted to him because of his insistence that Beckenbauer be allowed to join the West Germany U19 national team after initially being banned for impregnating a girl out of wedlock; He served as best man at Beckenbauer's wedding in 1966.

Cramer led Bayern to victory in the 1975 and 1976 European Champions Cup, in addition to capturing the 1976 Intercontinental Cup. The 1976 Bundesliga season, however, saw Bayern unable to recapture their form and, after a season that saw them fail to defend their domestic title, Cramer was forced to resign his position. Cramer was involved in a trade between Bayern and Eintracht Frankfurt, which saw him take the top spot at Frankfurt, while Frankfurt coach Gyula Lóránt made his way to Bayern. Neither club was happy with the trade, as Bayern finished a club worst 12th in the table, while Frankfurt's results were mediocre at best. As a result, the club parted ways with him on 30 June 1978.

Not until the 1982–83 season did Cramer find himself employed in the Bundesliga again, this time with club Bayer Leverkusen. At Leverkusen he managed to lead the club to their first top 9 finish in the league during his second year in charge. Failure to build on that accomplishment led to his dismissal after his third season in charge. Never to coach in the Bundesliga again, Cramer instead found coaching positions with various international clubs and associations around the world. In 2002 Cramer officially announced his retirement from football. In 2005, he was inducted into the Japan Football Hall of Fame.

== Personal life ==
Cramer served in World War II as a Senior Lieutenant with a German paratrooper division. For his international achievements, Cramer was awarded two honorary doctorates in addition to being presented with the Bundesverdienstkreuz (Federal Cross of Merit) in Germany. In 1971, Emperor Hirohito also personally presented him with membership in the Order of the Sacred Treasure for his service to Japan. Furthermore, Cramer was an honorary chieftain in the Native American Sioux and Mohican tribes. Cramer died at the age of 90 on 17 September 2015.

== Honours ==
Egypt

- Palestine Cup of Nations: 1972
- African Games bronze medal: 1973
- Africa Cup of Nations third place: 1974

FC Bayern Munich

- European Cup: 1974–75, 1975–76
- Intercontinental Cup: 1976

Individual

- France Football 40th Greatest Manager of All Time: 2019
- Inducted into Japan Football Hall of Fame

== Career statistics ==
As of 6 May 2012

Team	From	To	Record				
Team	From	To	G	W	D	L	Win %
Hertha BSC	1 July 1974	9 July 1974	0	0	0	0	—
United States	1 August 1974	16 January 1975	2	0	0	2	0.00
Bayern Munich	16 January 1975	27 November 1977	136	63	31	42	46.32
Eintracht Frankfurt	9 December 1977	30 June 1978	23	11	3	9	47.83
Saudi Arabia	3 September 1978	1 December 1980	17	6	6	5	35.29
Al-Ittihad	3 September 1978	1 December 1980					
Aris	1 December 1980	30 May 1981					
Bayer Leverkusen			108	36	30	42	33.33
Total			286	116	70	100	40.56

== See also ==
- Farewell, My Dear Cramer

Awards and achievements
Preceded by Udo Lattek	European Cup Winning Coach; 1974–75 & 1975–76	Succeeded by Bob Paisley
