= Bernd Dürnberger =

German footballer (born 1953)

Personal information
- Full name: Bernhard Dürnberger
- Date of birth: 17 September 1953 (age 73)
- Place of birth: Kirchanschöring, West Germany
- Height: 1.74 m (5 ft 9 in)
- Position: Midfielder

Youth career
- SV Kirchanschöring
- –1972: ESV Freilassing

Senior career*
Years	Team	Apps	(Gls)
1972–1985	Bayern Munich	375	(38)
Total		375	(38)

International career
1971–1972	West Germany Youth	15	(8)
1972	West Germany Amateur	1	(0)
1975–1980	West Germany B	5	(1)
- * Club domestic league appearances and goals

Bernhard "Bernd" Dürnberger (born 17 September 1953) is a German former professional footballer. A defensive midfielder, he played for thirteen seasons with Bayern Munich, from 1972 to 1985, winning eleven major trophies. Thus, together with Heinz Stuy, the goalkeeper of the golden era of AFC Ajax, he holds the record for being the player having won the most major club titles without having ever played for the national team of his country. He played in a total of 375 Bundesliga games and scored 38 goals. He never earned an international cap at senior level but appeared 78 times (9 goals) in the European cup competitions for Bayern Munich.

== Honours ==
Bayern Munich

- Bundesliga: 1972–73, 1973–74, 1979–80, 1980–81, 1984–85
- DFB-Pokal: 1981–82, 1983–84
- European Cup: 1973–74, 1974–75, 1975–76
- Intercontinental Cup: 1976
