= Jupp Kapellmann =

German footballer

Personal information
- Full name: Hans-Josef Kapellmann
- Date of birth: 19 December 1949 (age 76)
- Place of birth: Bardenberg, West Germany
- Height: 1.72 m (5 ft 8 in)
- Positions: Full-back; midfielder

Youth career
- 1957–1968: SC 1930 Bardenberg

Senior career*
Years	Team	Apps	(Gls)
1968–1970	Alemannia Aachen	42	(8)
1970–1973	1. FC Köln	91	(11)
1973–1979	Bayern Munich	165	(17)
1979–1981	1860 Munich	40	(0)
Total		338	(36)

International career
1967–1968	West Germany Youth	7	(1)
1969–1973	West Germany U-23	6	(0)
1972–1975	West Germany B	3	(0)
1973–1974	West Germany	5	(0)
Medal record
Men's football
Representing West Germany
FIFA World Cup
Winner	1974 West Germany
- * Club domestic league appearances and goals

Hans-Josef "Jupp" Kapellmann (born 19 December 1949 in Bardenberg) is a former West German footballer who played as a defender or midfielder.

Shining begin his career with recently promoted side Alemannia Aachen in a Bundesliga runner-up season in 1968–69. Kapellmann left Aachen for 1. FC Köln a year later, after Aachen were relegated from the Bundesliga. Kapellmann was a proven regular in midfield with 1. FC Köln until 1973, finishing in second place in both the Bundesliga and in the German Cup in 1972–73 with the side in his final season. Due to his in-form performances for the side, he was snapped up by FC Bayern Munich with his new club paying Köln 802,000 Deutsche Mark (a Bundesliga record at that time) for Kapellmann's services. Mainly used as defender later on in his career, Kapellmann was part of the European Cup-winning squads of Bayern in 1973–74, 1974–75, and also in 1975–76. He also won the Bundesliga title in 1973–74 and the Intercontinental Cup in 1976 with Die Bayern, but played the last forty of his 338 Bundesliga matches (36 goals) for local rival TSV 1860 Munich, with whom he spent two seasons after joining the club in 1979.

For West Germany, Jupp Kapellmann appeared in five games in between 1973 and 1974, but could not land himself a regular spot in the squad. In 1974, he was part of the host-nation-squad for the FIFA World Cup, watching his team lift the trophy from the bench.

After retiring, Kapellmann became a doctor for Orthopedic surgery in the Bavarian town of Rosenheim, where he currently resides and practises.

== Honours ==
Bayern Munich

- Bundesliga: 1973–74
- European Cup: 1973–74, 1974–75, 1975–76
- Intercontinental Cup: 1976

1. FC Köln

- DFB-Pokal: Runner-up 1970–71, 1972–73

Germany

- World Cup: 1974
