= Hans-Georg Schwarzenbeck =

German footballer

Georg Schwarzenbeck
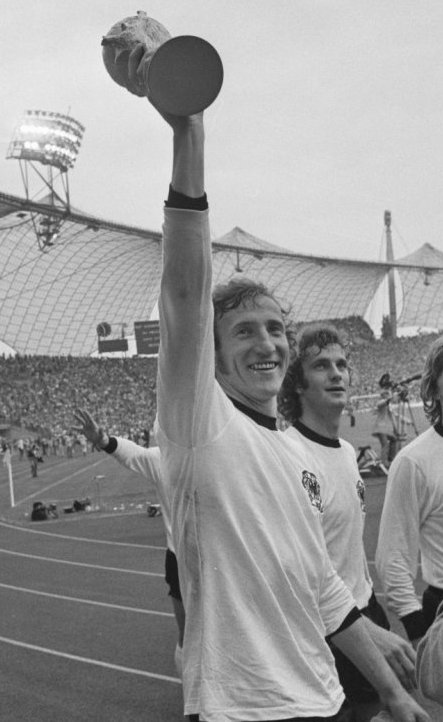
- Schwarzenbeck holding the FIFA World Cup trophy with West Germany in 1974

Personal information
- Full name: Hans-Georg Schwarzenbeck
- Date of birth: 3 April 1948 (age 78)
- Place of birth: Munich, Germany
- Height: 1.83 m (6 ft 0 in)
- Position: Centre-back

Youth career
- 1961–1962: Sportfreunde München
- 1962–1966: Bayern Munich

Senior career*
Years	Team	Apps	(Gls)
1966–1981	Bayern Munich	416	(21)

International career
1969–1971	West Germany U-23	2	(0)
1971–1978	West Germany	44	(0)
Medal record
Men's football
Representing West Germany
FIFA World Cup
Winner	1974 West Germany
UEFA European Championship
Winner	1972 Belgium
Runner-up	1976 Yugoslavia
- * Club domestic league appearances and goals

Hans-Georg "Katsche" Schwarzenbeck (born 3 April 1948) is a German former professional footballer who played as a defender. He played in the Bundesliga from 1966 to 1981, appearing in 416 matches for Bayern Munich. He won six German league championships, three German Cups, one European Cup Winners' Cup (defeating Rangers F.C. in the final), and three consecutive European Cups (1974 defeating Atlético Madrid, 1975 defeating Leeds United, 1976 defeating AS Saint-Étienne).

In the 1974 final, Schwarzenbeck scored the equalising goal in the European Cup final match against Atlético Madrid in the last minute of extra time with a long-range effort. Bayern won the replay 4–0 two days later.

Schwarzenbeck played 44 times for Germany between 1971 and 1978. His greatest success was the victory in the 1974 World Cup, West Germany defeating the Netherlands 2–1 in the final. He also helped the national team to victory in the 1972 European Championship, defeating the USSR in the final, and to the final of the 1976 tournament, losing to Czechoslovakia on penalty kicks in the final, after extra time.

== Honours ==
=== Club ===
Bayern Munich

- Bundesliga: 1968–69, 1971–72, 1972–73, 1973–74, 1979–80
- DFB-Pokal: 1966–67, 1968–69, 1970–71
- European Cup: 1973–74, 1974–75, 1975–76
- European Cup Winners' Cup: 1966–67
- Intercontinental Cup: 1976

=== International ===
West Germany

- FIFA World Cup: 1974
- UEFA European Championship: 1972

=== Individual ===
- World XI: 1972
- Bayern Munich All-time XI

== See also ==
- List of one-club men

Sporting positions
Preceded by Gerd Müller	Bayern Munich captain 1979–1980	Succeeded by Paul Breitner
