= 1972–73 FC Bayern Munich season =

8th season of Bayern Munich in the Bundesliga

Bayern Munich
1972–73 season
- Chairman: Wilhelm Neudecker
- Manager: Udo Lattek
- Stadium: Olympiastadion; Grünwalder Stadion
- Bundesliga: 1st (champions)
- DFB-Pokal: Quarter-finals
- DFB-Ligapokal: Group stage
- European Cup: Quarter-finals
- Top goalscorer: League: Gerd Müller (36); All: Gerd Müller (67)

The 1972–73 FC Bayern Munich season was the club's eighth season in Bundesliga.

== Team kit ==
| Home | Away | Away 2 | Away 3 |

== Squad ==
Note: Flags indicate national team as defined under FIFA eligibility rules; some limited exceptions apply. Players may hold more than one non-FIFA nationality.

| No. | Pos. | Nation | Player |
|---|---|---|---|
| — | GK | GER | Sepp Maier |
| — | GK | YUG | Zlatko Škorić |
| — | GK | GER | Manfred Seifert |
| — | DF | DEN | Johnny Hansen |
| — | DF | GER | Paul Breitner |
| — | DF | GER | Franz Beckenbauer |
| — | DF | GER | Hans-Georg Schwarzenbeck |
| — | DF | GER | Gernot Rohr |
| — | DF | GER | Günther Rybarczyk |
| — | DF | GER | Herbert Zimmermann |
| — | MF | GER | Franz Roth |
| — | MF | GER | Rainer Zobel |

| No. | Pos. | Nation | Player |
|---|---|---|---|
| — | MF | GER | Bernd Dürnberger |
| — | MF | GER | Wolfgang Sühnholz |
| — | MF | GER | Martin Wildgruber |
| — | MF | GER | Matthias Obermeier |
| — | MF | GER | Georg Weiß |
| — | FW | GER | Uli Hoeneß |
| — | FW | GER | Gerd Müller |
| — | FW | GER | Franz Krauthausen |
| — | FW | GER | Wilhelm Hoffmann |
| — | FW | GER | Edgar Schneider |
| — | FW | GER | Hans Jörg |

== Match results ==
=== Legend ===
Win Draw Loss

=== Bundesliga ===
| Pos | Team | Pld | W | D | L | GF | GA | GD | Pts | Qualification or relegation |
|---|---|---|---|---|---|---|---|---|---|---|
| 1 | Bayern Munich (C) | 34 | 25 | 4 | 5 | 93 | 29 | +64 | 54 | Qualification to European Cup first round |
| 2 | 1. FC Köln | 34 | 16 | 11 | 7 | 66 | 51 | +15 | 43 | Qualification to UEFA Cup first round |
| 3 | Fortuna Düsseldorf | 34 | 15 | 12 | 7 | 62 | 45 | +17 | 42 | Qualification to UEFA Cup first round |
| 4 | Wuppertaler SV | 34 | 15 | 10 | 9 | 62 | 49 | +13 | 40 | Qualification to UEFA Cup first round |
| 5 | Borussia Mönchengladbach | 34 | 17 | 5 | 12 | 82 | 61 | +21 | 39 | Qualification to Cup Winners' Cup first round |

Source: www.dfb.de
Rules for classification: 1) points; 2) goal difference; 3) number of goals scored.
(C) Champions

| 16 September 1972 1 | Rot-Weiß Oberhausen | 0–5 | Bayern Munich | Oberhausen |
| 15:30 CET | | Report | Müller 4', 45', 78'; Schwarzenbeck 38'; Hollmann 11' (o.g.) | Stadium: Niederrheinstadion; Attendance: 10,000; Referee: Gerhard Schulenburg |

| 20 September 1972 2 | Bayern Munich | 2–1 | Werder Bremen | Munich |
| 20:00 CET | Schneider 25'; Müller 46'; Roth (penalty missed) 50' | Report | Weist 60' | Stadium: Stadion an der Grünwalder Straße; Attendance: 25,000; Referee: Hans-Joachim Weyland |

| 23 September 1972 3 | Eintracht Braunschweig | 0–2 | Bayern Munich | Braunschweig |
| 15:30 CET | | Report | Hoffmann 58'; Müller 73' | Stadium: Eintracht-Stadion; Attendance: 17,000; Referee: Karl-Heinz Fork |

| 30 September 1972 4 | Bayern Munich | 4–0 | Hertha BSC | Munich |
| 15:30 CET | Müller 9', 15'; Hoeneß 52'; Beckenbauer 76' (pen.) | Report | | Stadium: Olympic Stadium; Attendance: 40,000; Referee: Rudolf Schröck |

| 4 October 1972 5 | Wuppertaler SV | 1–1 | Bayern Munich | Wuppertal |
| 20:00 CET | Kohle 49' | Report | Dürnberger 79' | Stadium: Stadion am Zoo; Attendance: 37,200; Referee: Jan Redelfs |

| 7 October 1972 6 | Bayern Munich | 5–0 | Schalke 04 | Munich |
| 15:30 CET | Hoffmann 20', 65'; Müller 27'; Roth 38'; Hoeneß 87' | Report | | Stadium: Olympic Stadium; Attendance: 68,000; Referee: Klaus Ohmsen |

| 14 October 1972 7 | Eintracht Frankfurt | 2–1 | Bayern Munich | Frankfurt |
| 15:30 CET | Weidle 52'; Hölzenbein 75' | Report | Beckenbauer (penalty missed) 38'; Müller 68' | Stadium: Waldstadion; Attendance: 42,000; Referee: Paul Kindervater |

| 21 October 1972 8 | Bayern Munich | 3–0 | Borussia Mönchengladbach | Munich |
| 15:30 CET | Müller 24', 48'; Hoeneß 66' | Report | | Stadium: Olympic Stadium; Attendance: 74,000; Referee: Ferdinand Biwersi |

| 28 October 1972 9 | VfB Stuttgart | 0–1 | Bayern Munich | Stuttgart |
| 15:30 CET | | Report | Hoeneß 18' | Stadium: Neckarstadion; Attendance: 59,500; Referee: Kurt Tschenscher |

| 31 October 1972 10 | Bayern Munich | 2–0 | MSV Duisburg | Munich |
| 20:00 CET | Müller 23' (pen.); Roth 50' | Report | | Stadium: Olympic Stadium; Attendance: 35,000; Referee: Herbert Lutz |

| 4 November 1972 11 | Hamburger SV | 0–2 | Bayern Munich | Hamburg |
| 15:30 CET | | Report | Hoeneß 83', 84' | Stadium: Volksparkstadion; Attendance: 34,000; Referee: Hans-Joachim Weyland |

| 11 November 1972 12 | Bayern Munich | 7–2 | Hannover 96 | Munich |
| 15:30 CET | Müller 4' (pen.), 63', 67', 80'; Krauthausen 22', 71'; Breitner 84' | Report | Siemensmeyer 26', 33' | Stadium: Olympic Stadium; Attendance: 22,000; Referee: Manfred Wichmann |

| 18 November 1972 13 | 1. FC Kaiserslautern | 3–1 | Bayern Munich | Ludwigshafen am Rhein |
| 15:30 CET | Hošić 38', 40'; Seel 59' | Report | Roth 88' | Stadium: Südweststadion; Attendance: 60,000; Referee: Diedrich Basedow |

| 21 November 1972 14 | Bayern Munich | 3–2 | Fortuna Düsseldorf | Munich |
| 20:00 CET | Hoeneß 55', 61'; Beckenbauer 69' | Report | Biesenkamp 47'; Geye 50' | Stadium: Olympic Stadium; Attendance: 61,000; Referee: Walter Horstmann |

| 25 November 1972 15 | VfL Bochum | 0–2 | Bayern Munich | Bochum |
| 15:30 CET | | Report | Hoeneß 42'; Müller 90' | Stadium: Stadion an der Castroper Straße; Attendance: 27,000; Referee: Günter Linn |

| 2 December 1972 16 | Bayern Munich | 3–1 | Kickers Offenbach | Munich |
| 15:30 CET | Müller 48', 62'; Beckenbauer 76' | Report | Held 90' | Stadium: Olympic Stadium; Attendance: 32,000; Referee: Gerd Siepe |

| 16 December 1972 17 | 1. FC Köln | 2–1 | Bayern Munich | Cologne |
| 15:30 CET | Cullmann 10'; Kapellmann 90' | Report | Müller (penalty missed) 18'; Krauthausen 18' | Stadium: Radrennbahn; Attendance: 28,000; Referee: Ferdinand Biwersi |

| 20 January 1973 18 | Bayern Munich | 5–3 | Rot-Weiß Oberhausen | Munich |
| 15:30 CET | Hollmann 4' (o.g.); Hoffmann 7'; Müller 12' (pen.), 68'; Hoeneß 72' | Report | Wilbertz 58'; Tenhagen 74'; Kobluhn 75' (pen.) | Stadium: Olympic Stadium; Attendance: 18,000; Referee: Wolfgang Dittmer |

| 27 January 1973 19 | Werder Bremen | 1–0 | Bayern Munich | Bremen |
| 15:30 CET | Hasebrink 48' | Report | | Stadium: Weserstadion; Attendance: 30,000; Referee: Peter Gabor |

| 3 February 1973 20 | Bayern Munich | 3–0 | Eintracht Braunschweig | Munich |
| 15:30 CET | Hoffmann 28'; Hoeneß 72'; Müller 76' | Report | | Stadium: Olympic Stadium; Attendance: 13,000; Referee: Hans-Joachim Weyland |

| 10 February 1973 21 | Hertha BSC | 2–5 | Bayern Munich | Berlin |
| 15:30 CET | Horr (penalty missed) 12'; Müller 62' (pen.); Müller 78' (pen.) | Report | Müller 25' (pen.); Hoffmann 41', 60'; Zobel 69'; Hoeneß 79' | Stadium: Olympic Stadium; Attendance: 60,000; Referee: Heinz Quindeau |

| 17 February 1973 22 | Bayern Munich | 4–1 | Wuppertaler SV | Munich |
| 15:30 CET | Hoeneß 3'; Müller 16'; Dürnberger 48'; Hoffmann 65' | Report | Kohle 12' (pen.) | Stadium: Olympic Stadium; Attendance: 22,000; Referee: Walter Horstmann |

| 12 February 1973 23 | Schalke 04 | 1–1 | Bayern Munich | Gelsenkirchen |
| 15:30 CET | Ehmke 48' | Report | Hoeneß 46' | Stadium: Glückauf-Kampfbahn; Attendance: 33,000; Referee: Gerhard Schulenburg |

| 10 March 1973 24 | Bayern Munich | 3–1 | Eintracht Frankfurt | Munich |
| 15:30 CET | Schneider 26'; Breitner 65'; Beckenbauer 66' | Report | Hofmeister 42' | Stadium: Olympic Stadium; Attendance: 18,000; Referee: Diedrich Basedowg |

| 17 March 1973 25 | Borussia Mönchengladbach | 0–3 | Bayern Munich | Mönchengladbach |
| 15:30 CET | | Report | Hansen 28'; Krauthausen 37'; Zobel 63' | Stadium: Bökelbergstadion; Attendance: 34,500; Referee: Klaus Ohmsen |

| 24 March 1973 26 | Bayern Munich | 5–1 | VfB Stuttgart | Munich |
| 15:30 CET | Schneider 22'; Beckenbauer 30'; Breitner 77'; Müller 80' (pen.), 84' | Report | Handschuh 59' | Stadium: Olympic Stadium; Attendance: 33,000; Referee: Peter Gabor |

| 31 March 1973 27 | MSV Duisburg | 2–0 | Bayern Munich | Duisburg |
| 15:30 CET | Worm 25'; Wunder 70' | Report | | Stadium: Wedaustadion; Attendance: 33,000; Referee: Walter Horstmann |

| 7 April 1975 28 | Bayern Munich | 1–0 | Hamburger SV | Munich |
| 15:30 CET | Müller 74' | Report | | Stadium: Olympic Stadium; Attendance: 16,000; Referee: Gerd Hennig |

| 28 April 1973 29 | Hannover 96 | 1–3 | Bayern Munich | Hannover |
| 15:00 CET | Stegmeyer 36' | Report | Roth 27'; Müller 58'; Hoeneß 65' | Stadium: Niedersachsenstadion; Attendance: 48,000; Referee: Gerd Siepe |

| 5 May 1973 30 | Bayern Munich | 6–0 | 1. FC Kaiserslautern | Munich |
| 15:30 CET | Hoeneß 5'; Müller 18', 29' (pen.), 48', 66' (pen.), 79' | Report | | Stadium: Olympic Stadium; Attendance: 28,000; Referee: Karl-Heinz Fork |

| 19 May 1973 31 | Fortuna Düsseldorf | 0–0 | Bayern Munich | Düsseldorf |
| 15:30 CET | | Report | | Stadium: Rheinstadion; Attendance: 45,000; Referee: Gerhard Schulenburg |

| 26 May 1973 32 | Bayern Munich | 5–1 | VfL Bochum | Munich |
| 15:30 CET | Müller 31', 54'; Dürnberger 58'; Breitner 73'; Hoffmann 90' | Report | Hartl 8' | Stadium: Olympic Stadium; Attendance: 13,000; Referee: Norbert Fuchs |

| 2 June 1973 33 | Kickers Offenbach | 0–3 | Bayern Munich | Offenbach |
| 15:30 CET | | Report | Roth 45'; Müller 83'; Beckenbauer 87' | Stadium: Stadion am Bieberer Berg; Attendance: 30,000; Referee: Eberhard Schmoock |

| 9 June 1973 34 | Bayern Munich | 1–1 | 1. FC Köln | Munich |
| 15:30 CET | Hoeneß 80' | Report | Hein 50' | Stadium: Olympic Stadium; Attendance: 50,000; Referee: Rudolf Schröck |

=== DFB-Pokal ===
| 9 December 1972 1st Round | HSV Barmbeck-Uhlenhorst | 1–4 | Bayern Munich | Hamburg |
| 14:00 CET | Greif 68' | Report | Hoffmann 2'; Breitner 23'; Zobel 57'; Müller 80' | Stadium: Rothenbaum; Attendance: 9,883; Referee: Gerd Hennig |

| 20 December 1972 1st Round | Bayern Munich | 7–0 | HSV Barmbeck-Uhlenhorst | Munich |
| 20:00 CET | Müller 3', 52', 86' (pen.); Dürnberger 12'; Hoeneß 55', 57', 88' | Report | | Stadium: Olympic Stadium; Attendance: 3,000; Referee: Klaus Overberg |

| 3 March 1973 Round of 16 | Rot-Weiß Oberhausen | 1–2 | Bayern Munich | Oberhausen |
| 15:30 CET | Hollmann (penalty missed) 45'; Jakobs 89' | Report | Schneider 71'; Dürnberger 74' | Stadium: Niederrheinstadion; Attendance: 6,000; Referee: Herbert Lutz |

| 14 March 1973 Round of 16 | Bayern Munich | 3–1 | Rot-Weiß Oberhausen | Munich |
| 20:00 CET | Müller 22', 47'; Zobel 50' | Report | Tenhagen 73' | Stadium: Olympic Stadium; Attendance: 3,000; Referee: Gert Meuser |

| 14 April 1973 Quarterfinals | Kickers Offenbach | 2–2 | Bayern Munich | Offenbach |
| 15:30 CET | Theis 28'; Skala 37' | Report | Schwarzenbeck 7', 88' | Stadium: Stadion am Bieberer Berg; Attendance: 30,000; Referee: Kurt Tschenscher |

| 18 April 1973 Quarterfinals | Bayern Munich | 2–4 | Kickers Offenbach | Munich |
| 20:00 CET | Hansen 69'; Müller 72' (pen.) | Report | Held 37', 44'; Schäfer 58'; Ritschel 88' | Stadium: Olympic Stadium; Attendance: 15,000; Referee: Walter Eschweiler |

=== DFB-Ligapokal ===
| 2 August 1972 Group Stage 1 | 1860 Munich | 1–3 | Bayern Munich |
| 20:00 |

| 13 August 1972 Group Stage 2 | VfB Stuttgart | 2–3 | Bayern Munich |
| 17:00 |

| 16 August 1972 Group Stage 3 | Bayern Hof | 4–1 | Bayern Munich |

| 19 August 1972 Group Stage 4 | Bayern Munich | 1–2 | VfB Stuttgart |
| 17:00 |

| 23 August 1972 Group Stage 5 | Bayern Munich | 5–3 | 1860 Munich |
| 20:00 |

| 3 September 1972 Group Stage 6 | Bayern Munich | 4–5 | Bayern Hof |
| 15:00 |

=== European Cup ===
| 13 September 1972 1st Round | Galatasaray (Turkey) | 1–1 | (West Germany) Bayern Munich | Istanbul |
| 20:00 CET | Ünder 55' | Report | Müller 66' | Stadium: İnönü Stadium; Attendance: 40,000; Referee: Aurelio Angonese (Italy) |

| 27 September 1972 1st Round | Bayern Munich (West Germany) | 6–0 (7–1 agg.) | (Turkey) Galatasaray | Munich |
| 20:00 CET | Müller 14', 78'; Hoeneß 29'; Schneider 35'; Beckenbauer 76' (pen.); Roth 88' | Report | Ünder (yellow card) 21'; Sipahi (yellow card) 57' | Stadium: Olympic Stadium; Attendance: 70,000; Referee: Santos Fernando Leite (Portugal) |

| 24 October 1972 Round of 16 | Bayern Munich (West Germany) | 9–0 | (Cyprus) Omonia | Munich |
| 20:00 CET | Müller 14', 37', 54', 73', 74'; Hoeneß 25'; Roth 42'; Schneider 69', 82' | Report | Andreou (yellow card) 1' | Stadium: Olympic Stadium; Attendance: 25,000; Referee: Michal Jursa (Czechoslovakia) |

| 26 October 1972 Round of 16 | Omonia (Cyprus) | 0–4 (0–13 agg.) | (West Germany) Bayern Munich | Augsburg |
| 20:00 CET | | Report | Roth 29'; Müller 42', 66'; Hoffmann 50'; Paul Breitner (yellow card) 83' | Stadium: Rosenaustadion; Attendance: 20,000; Referee: Josef Placek (Czechoslovakia) |

| 7 March 1973 Quarterfinals | Ajax (Netherlands) | 4–0 | (West Germany) Bayern Munich | Amsterdam |
| 20:15 CET | Haan 53', 70'; G. Mühren 68'; Cruyff 89' | Report | Roth (yellow card) 2' | Stadium: Olympic Stadium; Attendance: 65,000; Referee: Rudolf Scheurer (Switzerland) |

| 21 March 1973 Quarterfinals | Bayern Munich (West Germany) | 2–1 (2–5 agg.) | (Netherlands) Ajax | Munich |
| 20:15 CET | Schwarzenbeck (yellow card) 16'; Krol 30' (o.g.); Müller 39' | Report | Keizer 8' (yellow card) 60' | Stadium: Olympic Stadium; Attendance: 77,000; Referee: Kenneth Howard Burns (England) |
