= Bundesliga records and statistics =

Bundesliga records

The Bundesliga was founded as the top tier of German football at the start of the 1963–64 season. The following is a list of records attained in the Bundesliga since the league's inception.

Statistics are accurate as of the 2026–27 season.

== Club records ==
=== Titles ===
- Highest number of titles won: 34 (Note: Source: kicker.de - Choosable league table for every season) (Note: Total titles for Bayern are 35, but the first German title in 1932 came in the pre-Bundesliga era.) by Bayern Munich (1968–69, 1971–72, 1972–73, 1973–74, 1979–80, 1980–81, 1984–85, 1985–86, 1986–87, 1988–89, 1989–90, 1993–94, 1996–97, 1998–99, 1999–2000 2000–01, 2002–03, 2004–05, 2005–06, 2007–08, 2009–10, 2012–13, 2013–14, 2014–15, 2015–16, 2016–17, 2017–18, 2018–19, 2019–20, 2020–21, 2021–22, 2022–23, 2024–25, 2025–26)

=== Champions ===
- Highest number of games left when becoming champions: 7 by Bayern Munich (2013–14)
- Earliest point of time in a year for a team to be crowned champions: 25 March by Bayern Munich (2013–14)
- Latest point of time in a year for a team to be crowned champions: 28 June by Bayern Munich (1971–72)
- Highest number of matchdays being league leaders: 858 by Bayern Munich
- Highest number of matchdays being league leaders in a season: 34 by Bayern Munich (1968–69, 1972–73, 1984–85, 2007–08, 2012–13 and 2025–26)
- Lowest number of matchdays being league leaders in a season for the champions: 1 by Bayern Munich (1985–86)
- Lowest number of seasons before becoming champions after being promoted: 1 by 1. FC Kaiserslautern (Promotion: 1997; Champions: 1997–98)
- Lowest number of seasons before getting relegated for the champions: 1 by 1. FC Nürnberg (Champions: 1967–68; Relegation: 1968–69)

=== Points ===
- Highest number of points: 4,238 by Bayern Munich
- Highest number of points in a season: 91 by Bayern Munich (2012–13)
- Highest number of points in a season for the runners-up: 78 by Borussia Dortmund (2015–16)
- Highest number of points in a season opening half: 47 by Bayern Munich (2013–14 and 2025–26)
- Highest number of points in a season closing half: 49 by Bayern Munich (2012–13 and 2019–20)
- Highest number of points in a season away: 47 by Bayern Munich (2012–13)
- Highest number of points in a season at home: 49 (Note: Converted to 3 points) by Schalke 04 (33:1) (1971–72), Bayern Munich (33:1) (1972–73) and VfL Wolfsburg (2008–09)
- Highest percentage of total possible points in a season: 89.22 by Bayern Munich (2012–13) (91 points out of a possible 102)
- Highest percentage of total possible points in a season opening half: 92.16 by Bayern Munich (2013–14 and 2025–26) (47 points out of a possible 51)
- Highest percentage of total possible points in a season closing half: 96.08 by Bayern Munich (2012–13 and 2019–20) (49 points out of a possible 51)
- Highest percentage of total possible points in a season at home: 96.08 by Schalke 04 (1971–72), Bayern Munich (1972–73) and VfL Wolfsburg (2008–09) (49 points out of a possible 51) (Based on 16 wins and a draw with 3 points per win)
- Highest percentage of total possible points in a season away: 92.16 by Bayern Munich (2012–13) (47 points out of a possible 51)
- Biggest lead in points after a season opening half: 11 by Bayern Munich (45) upon VfL Wolfsburg (34) (2014–15) and Bayern Munich (47) upon Borussia Dortmund (36) (2025–26)
- Biggest margin of points between champions and runners-up: 25 between Bayern Munich (91) and Borussia Dortmund (66) (2012–13)
- Lowest margin of points between champions and runners-up: 0 points, +3 goal difference between 1. FC Köln (+45) and Borussia Mönchengladbach (+42) (1977–78). Both finished with 48 points.
- Highest percentage of points difference between champions and runners-up: 27.47 between Bayern Munich (91) and Borussia Dortmund (66) (2012–13)
- Highest points per game average: 2.04 by Bayern Munich (4,238 points in 2,078 games)
- Highest points per game average (at least 5 seasons): 2.04 by Bayern Munich (4,238 points in 2,078 games)
- Highest points per game average in a season: 2.68 by Bayern Munich (2012–13)
- Lowest number of points: 10 by Tasmania Berlin
- Lowest number of points in a season: 10 by Tasmania Berlin (8:60) (1965–66)
- Lowest number of points in a season opening half: 4 by Tasmania Berlin (3:31) (1965–66)
- Lowest number of points in a season closing half: 4 by Hannover 96 (4:30) (1985–86)
- Lowest number of points in a season away: 0 by 1. FC Nürnberg (1983–84)
- Lowest number of points in a season at home: 4 by Greuther Fürth (2012–13)
- Highest number of points in a calendar year: 93 by Bayern Munich (2013)
- Highest percentage of total possible points in a calendar year: 93.94 by Bayern Munich (2013) (93 points out of a possible 99)

=== Wins and losses ===
- Highest number of wins: 1,265 by Bayern Munich
- Highest number of wins in a season: 29 by Bayern Munich (2012–13 and 2013–14)
- Highest number of wins in a season opening half: 15 by Bayern Munich (2013–14, 2015–16 and 2025–26)
- Highest number of wins in a season closing half: 16 by Bayern Munich (2012–13 and 2019–20)
- Highest number of wins in a season away: 15 by Bayern Munich (2012–13)
- Highest number of wins in a season at home: 16 by Schalke 04 (1971–72), Bayern Munich (1972–73) and VfL Wolfsburg (2008–09)
- Lowest number of losses: 14 by Preußen Münster
- Lowest number of losses in a season: 0 by Bayer Leverkusen (2023–24)
- Lowest number of losses in a season opening half: 0 by Hamburger SV (1982–83), Bayern Munich (1988–89, 2013–14, 2014–15 and 2025–26), Bayer Leverkusen (2009–10 and 2023–24) and TSG Hoffenheim (2016–17)
- Lowest number of losses in a season closing half: 0 by Eintracht Frankfurt (1976–77), Bayern Munich (1986–87, 2012–13 and 2019–20), Borussia Dortmund (2011–12) and Bayer Leverkusen (2023–24)
- Lowest number of losses in a season away: 0 by Bayern Munich (1986–87, 2012–13 and 2025–26) and Bayer Leverkusen (2023–24 and 2024–25)
- Lowest number of losses in a season at home (30 games): 0 by Hamburger SV (1963–64) and Werder Bremen (1964–65)
- Lowest number of losses in a season at home (34 games): 0
  - 1860 Munich (1965–66)
  - Bayern Munich (1970–71 to 1973–74, 1980–81, 1983–84, 1996–97, 1998–99, 2001–02, 2007–08, 2016–17 and 2020–21)
  - MSV Duisburg (1970–71)
  - Schalke 04 (1970–71)
  - Eintracht Frankfurt (1971–72, 1973–74 and 2020–21)
  - 1. FC Köln (1972–73 and 1987–88)
  - Hertha BSC (1974–75 and 1977–78)
  - Eintracht Braunschweig (1975–76)
  - Hamburger SV (1981–82, 1982–83 and 1995–96)
  - 1. FC Kaiserslautern (1981–82 and 1994–95)
  - Werder Bremen (1982–83, 1984–85, 1985–86 and 1992–93)
  - Borussia Mönchengladbach (1983–84)
  - Karlsruher SC (1992–93)
  - Bayer Leverkusen (1999–2000 and 2023–24)
  - VfL Wolfsburg (2008–09 and 2014–15)
  - Borussia Dortmund (2008–09, 2015–16 and 2016–17)
  - Hannover 96 (2011–12)
  - TSG Hoffenheim (2016–17)
  - Union Berlin (2022–23)
- Lowest number of losses in a season at home (38 games): 0 by 1. FC Kaiserslautern (1991–92) and Borussia Dortmund (1991–92)
- Highest number of losses: 717 by Eintracht Frankfurt
- Highest number of losses in a season: 28 by Tasmania Berlin (1965–66)
- Highest number of losses in a season opening half: 15 by Tasmania Berlin (1965–66)
- Highest number of losses in a season closing half: 13 by Tasmania Berlin (1965–66) and FC St. Pauli (1996–97)
- Highest number of losses in a season at home: 13 by Greuther Fürth (2012–13), Hannover 96 (2015–16) and Darmstadt 98 (2023–24)
- Highest number of losses in a season away: 17 by 1. FC Nürnberg (1983–84)
- Lowest number of wins in a season: 2 by Tasmania Berlin (1965–66) and Wuppertaler SV (1974–75)
- Lowest number of wins in a season opening half: 0 by 1. FC Nürnberg (2013–14)
- Lowest number of wins in a season closing half: 0 by Wuppertaler SV (1974–75) and Hannover 96 (1985–86)
- Lowest number of wins in a season at home: 0 by Greuther Fürth (2012–13)
- Lowest number of wins in a season away: 0
  - Tasmania Berlin (1965–66)
  - Karlsruher SC (1965–66, 1967–68 and 1976–77)
  - Borussia Neunkirchen (1967–68)
  - Borussia Dortmund (1967–68 and 1978–79)
  - Hannover 96 (1969–70, 1971–72 and 2018–19)
  - Alemannia Aachen (1969–70)
  - Arminia Bielefeld (1971–72)
  - Rot-Weiß Oberhausen (1972–73)
  - Hertha BSC (1972–73 and 1982–83)
  - Wuppertaler SV (1974–75)
  - VfB Stuttgart (1974–75 and 2000–01)
  - VfL Bochum (1975–76)
  - Tennis Borussia Berlin (1976–77)
  - Rot-Weiss Essen (1976–77)
  - Bayern Munich (1977–78)
  - Eintracht Braunschweig (1979–80)
  - Bayer 05 Uerdingen (1980–81)
  - Fortuna Düsseldorf (1981–82)
  - MSV Duisburg (1981–82)
  - 1. FC Nürnberg (1983–84 and 2018–19)
  - Kickers Offenbach (1983–84)
  - Eintracht Frankfurt (1986–87 and 1995–96)
  - FC 08 Homburg (1986–87)
  - SV Waldhof Mannheim (1986–87)
  - FC St. Pauli (1988–89 and 2001–02)
  - Dynamo Dresden (1992–93)
  - SG Wattenscheid 09 (1993–94)
  - Borussia Mönchengladbach (1998–99 and 2004–05)
  - 1. FC Köln (2003–04)
  - SC Freiburg (2003–04)
  - Schalke 04 (2020–21)
  - Greuther Fürth (2021–22)
- Highest winning percentage: 60.88 by Bayern Munich (1,265 wins in 2,078 games)
- Highest winning percentage (at least 5 seasons): 60.88 by Bayern Munich (1,265 wins in 2,078 games)
- Highest losing percentage: 82.35 by Tasmania Berlin (28 losses in 34 games)
- Highest percentage of wins in a season: 85.29 by Bayern Munich (2012–13 and 2013–14) (29 wins in 34 games)
- Highest percentage of wins in a season opening half: 88.24 by Bayern Munich (2013–14, 2015–16 and 2025–26) (15 wins in 17 games)
- Highest percentage of wins in a season closing half: 94.12 by Bayern Munich (2012–13 and 2019–20) (16 wins in 17 games)
- Highest number of wins in a debut season: 20 by Bayern Munich (1965–66) and RB Leipzig (2016–17)
- Highest number of wins in a calendar year: 30 by Bayern Munich (2013)
- Highest percentage of wins in a calendar year: 90.90 by Bayern Munich (2013) (30 wins in 33 games)
- Lowest number of losses in a calendar year: 0 by Bayern Munich (2013)

=== Goals ===
- Highest number of goals scored: 4,736 by Bayern Munich
- Highest number of goals scored in a season: 122 by Bayern Munich (2025–26)
- Highest number of goals scored in a season opening half: 66 by Bayern Munich (2025–26)
- Highest number of goals scored in a season closing half: 56 by Bayern Munich (2025–26)
- Highest number of goals scored in a season at home: 69 by Bayern Munich (1971–72)
- Highest number of goals scored in a season away: 54 by Bayern Munich (2025–26)
- Lowest number of conceded goals: 52 by Preußen Münster
- Lowest number of conceded goals in a season: 17 by Bayern Munich (2015–16)
- Lowest number of conceded goals in a season away: 7 by Bayern Munich (2012–13)
- Lowest number of conceded goals in a season at home: 5 by Werder Bremen (1992–93)
- Lowest number of conceded goals in a season opening half: 4 by Bayern Munich (2014–15)
- Lowest number of conceded goals in a season closing half: 9 by Bayern Munich (2015–16)
- Best goal difference: +2,471 by Bayern Munich
- Best goal difference in a season: +86 by Bayern Munich (2025–26)
- Best goal difference in a season away: +38 by Bayern Munich (2013–14)
- Best goal difference in a season at home: +49 by Bayern Munich (1972–73 and 2025–26)
- Best goal difference in a season opening half: +53 by Bayern Munich (2025–26)
- Best goal difference in a season closing half: +44 by Bayern Munich (2019–20)
- Lowest number of goals scored: 15 by Tasmania Berlin
- Lowest number of goals scored in a season: 15 by Tasmania Berlin (1965–66)
- Lowest number of goals scored in a season away: 7 by Tasmania Berlin (1965–66)
- Lowest number of goals scored in a season at home: 8 by Tasmania Berlin (1965–66)
- Lowest number of goals scored in a season opening half: 8 by Tasmania Berlin (1965–66) and Eintracht Frankfurt (1988–89)
- Lowest number of goals scored in a season closing half: 7 by Tasmania Berlin (1965–66)
- Highest number of conceded goals: 3,070 by Werder Bremen
- Highest number of conceded goals in a season: 108 by Tasmania Berlin (1965–66)
- Highest number of conceded goals in a season away: 70 by Kickers Offenbach (1983–84)
- Highest number of conceded goals in a season at home: 46 by Tasmania Berlin (1965–66)
- Highest number of conceded goals in a season opening half: 58 by Tasmania Berlin (1965–66)
- Highest number of conceded goals in a season closing half: 53 by Kickers Offenbach and Fortuna Düsseldorf (both 1983–84)
- Worst goal difference: −397 by VfL Bochum
- Worst goal difference in a season: −93 by Tasmania Berlin (1965–66)
- Worst goal difference in a season away: −55 by Tasmania Berlin (1965–66) and Kickers Offenbach (1983–84)
- Worst goal difference in a season at home: −38 by Tasmania Berlin (1965–66)
- Worst goal difference in a season opening half: −50 by Tasmania Berlin (1965–66)
- Worst goal difference in a season closing half: −43 by Tasmania Berlin (1965–66)
- Scoring in every game of the season (30 games): 1. FC Köln (1963–64)
- Scoring in every game of the season (34 games): Bayern Munich (2012–13, 2020–21, 2021–22 and 2025–26)
- Highest number of clean sheets in a season: 22 by Bayern Munich (2014–15)
- Highest number of clean sheets in a season opening half: 13 by Bayern Munich (2014–15)
- Highest number of clean sheets in a season away: 12 by Bayern Munich (2012–13)
- Highest number of wins with a clean sheet in a season: 21 by Bayern Munich (2012–13)
- Highest number of wins by at least 2 goals in a season: 23 by Bayern Munich (2012–13)
- Biggest loss at home: 0–9 by Tasmania Berlin against MSV Duisburg (matchday 27 of 1965–66)
- Biggest win at home: 12–0 by Borussia Mönchengladbach against Borussia Dortmund (matchday 34 of 1977–78)
- Highest number of goals in one half: 10 by Borussia Dortmund against Arminia Bielefeld (matchday 12 of 1982–83),
- Highest number of goalless draws in a season: 9 by 1. FC Köln (2014–15)
- Lowest number of touches in a game before a goal by the scoring team: 1 by TSG Hoffenheim (matchday 2 of 2015–16) (Note: Kevin Volland scored the fastest goal ever with 9.2 seconds (Bellarabi's goal was at 9.5), but the Bundesliga only counts the first digit and so they share the record with 9 seconds each.)
- Lowest number of shots on goal in a game by one team: 0 by Werder Bremen (matchday 8 of 2014–15)

=== Runs ===
- Highest number of consecutive seasons in the Bundesliga: 62 by Bayern Munich
- Highest number of consecutive seasons in the Bundesliga since the start of the league: 55 by Hamburger SV
- Highest number of consecutive titles: 11 by Bayern Munich (2012–13 to 2022–23)
- Highest number of consecutive wins: 19 by Bayern Munich (matchday 9 to 27 of 2013–14)
- Highest number of consecutive wins in a season: 19 by Bayern Munich (matchday 9 to 27 of 2013–14)
- Highest number of consecutive wins in a debut season: 8 by RB Leipzig (matchday 6 to 13 of 2016–17)
- Highest number of consecutive wins from start of the season: 10 by Bayern Munich (2015–16)
- Highest number of consecutive wins from start of the season closing half: 14 by Bayern Munich (2012–13)
- Highest number of consecutive wins away: 11 by Bayern Munich (matchday 11 to 27 of 2013–14 and matchday 16 to 34 of 2019–20)
- Highest number of consecutive wins at home: 26 by Bayern Munich (matchday 16 of 1971–72 to matchday 32 of 1972–73)
- Highest number of consecutive wins at home in a season: 16 by Bayern Munich (matchday 2 to 32 of 1972–73)
- Highest number of consecutive wins at home from start of the season: 16 by Bayern Munich (1972–73)
- Highest number of consecutive games unbeaten: 53 by Bayern Munich (matchday 10 of 2012–13 to matchday 28 of 2013–14)
- Highest number of consecutive games unbeaten in a season: 34 by Bayer Leverkusen (matchday 1 to 34 of 2023–24)
- Highest number of consecutive games unbeaten from start of the season: 34 by Bayer Leverkusen (2023–24)
- Highest number of consecutive games unbeaten from start of the season closing half: 17 by Eintracht Frankfurt (1976–77), Bayern Munich (1986–87, 2012–13 and 2019–20), Borussia Dortmund (2011–12) and Bayer Leverkusen (2023–24)
- Highest number of consecutive games unbeaten from debut: 13 by RB Leipzig (2016–17)
- Highest number of consecutive games unbeaten away: 37 by Bayer Leverkusen (matchday 2 of 2023–24 to matchday 7 of 2025–26)
- Highest number of consecutive games unbeaten at home: 73 by Bayern Munich (matchday 31 of 1969–70 to matchday 4 of 1974–75)
- Highest number of consecutive games unbeaten in season opening halves: 56 by Bayern Munich (matchday 10 of 2012–13 to matchday 14 of 2015–16)
- Highest number of consecutive games scoring at least one goal: 87 by Bayern Munich (matchday 22 of 2019–20 to matchday 6 of 2022–23)
- Highest number of consecutive games scoring at least one goal from debut: 14 by Wuppertaler SV (1974–75)
- Highest number of consecutive games scoring at least two goals: 26 by Bayern Munich (matchday 27 of 2024–25 to matchday 18 of 2025–26)
- Highest number of consecutive games scoring at least three goals: 9 by RB Leipzig (matchday 10 to 18 of 2019–20)
- Highest number of consecutive games scoring at least one goal away: 54 by Bayern Munich (matchday 2 of 2019–20 to matchday 5 of 2022–23)
- Highest number of consecutive games scoring at least one goal at home: 65 by Bayern Munich (matchday 23 of 2019–20 to matchday 17 of 2023–24)
- Highest number of consecutive games scoring at least one goal in a season: 34 by Bayern Munich (2012–13, 2020–21, 2021–22 and 2025–26)
- Highest number of consecutive wins with a clean sheet away: 6 by Bayern Munich (matchday 14 to 24 of 2012–13)
- Highest number of consecutive wins with a clean sheet away from start of the season: 5 by Bayern Munich (2012–13)
- Highest number of consecutive games with a clean sheet: 9 by VfB Stuttgart (matchday 34 of 2002–03 to matchday 8 of 2003–04)
- Highest number of consecutive games with a clean sheet in a season: 8 by Bayern Munich (matchday 17, 12 and 18 to 23 of 1998–99 and matchday 2 to 9 of 2011–12) and VfB Stuttgart (matchday 1 to 8 of 2003–04)
- Highest number of consecutive games with a clean sheet from start of the season: 8 by VfB Stuttgart (2003–04)
- Highest number of consecutive games with a clean sheet at home: 9 by VfL Bochum (matchday 8 to 24 of 2003–04)
- Highest number of consecutive games with a clean sheet away: 6 by 1. FC Köln (matchday 6 to 16 of 2009–10) and Bayern Munich (matchday 14 to 24 of 2012–13 and matchday 4 to 15 of 2014–15)
- Highest number of consecutive minutes without conceding: 884 by VfB Stuttgart (minute 76 of matchday 33 of 2002–03 to minute 59 of matchday 9 of 2003–04)
- Highest number of consecutive minutes without conceding away: 658 by Bayern Munich (from minute 46 of matchday 12 to minute 75 of matchday 26 of 2012–13)
- Highest number of consecutive games without a win: 31 by Tasmania Berlin (matchday 2 to 32 of 1965–66)
- Highest number of consecutive games without a win from start of the season: 17 by 1. FC Nürnberg (2013–14)
- Highest number of consecutive games without a win from start of the season closing half: 17 by Wuppertaler SV (1974–75) and Hannover 96 (1985–86)
- Highest number of consecutive games without a win away: 38 by Schalke 04 (matchday 14 of 2019–20 to matchday 21 of 2022–23)
- Highest number of consecutive games without a win at home: 23 by Greuther Fürth (matchday 1 to 33 of 2012–13 and matchday 2 to 13 of 2021–22)
- Highest number of consecutive games losing: 12 by Greuther Fürth (matchday 3 to 14 of 2021–22)
- Highest number of consecutive games losing from start of the season: 6 by Fortuna Düsseldorf (1991–92), Mainz 05 (2020–21) and Borussia Mönchengladbach (2026–27)
- Highest number of consecutive games losing from start of the season closing half: 7 by Hannover 96 (2009–10)
- Highest number of consecutive games losing away: 29 by 1. FC Nürnberg (matchday 11 of 1982–83 to matchday 34 of 1983–84)
- Highest number of consecutive games losing at home: 8 by Tasmania Berlin (matchday 3 to 17 of 1965–66) and Hansa Rostock (matchday 2 to 15 of 2004–05)
- Highest number of consecutive games losing at home from start of the (home) season: 8 by Hansa Rostock (2004–05)
- Highest number of consecutive games without scoring: 10 by 1. FC Köln (matchday 15 to 24 of 2001–02)
- Highest number of consecutive minutes without scoring: 1,033 by 1. FC Köln (from minute 31 of matchday 14 to minute 74 of matchday 25 of 2001–02)
- Highest number of consecutive games without scoring from start of the season: 5 by VfL Bochum (1979–80) and Hamburger SV (2014–15)
- Highest number of consecutive minutes without scoring from start of the season: 507 by Hamburger SV (from minute 1 of matchday 1 to minute 57 of matchday 6 of 2014–15)
- Highest number of consecutive seasons with all games sold out: 10 by Bayern Munich (2007–08 to 2016–17)
- Highest number of consecutive seasons with all home games sold out: 12 by Bayern Munich (2007–08 to 2018–19) (Note: Source: kicker.de - Choosable attendance tables for every season)
- Highest number of consecutive seasons with all away games sold out: 11 by Bayern Munich (2006–07 to 2016–17)
- Highest number of consecutive seasons with at least one sold out game: 52 by Bayern Munich (1968–69 to 2019–20)
- Highest number of consecutive seasons with at least one sold out home game: 37 by Bayern Munich (1983–84 to 2019–20)
- Highest number of consecutive seasons with at least one sold out away game: 52 by Bayern Munich (1968–69 to 2019–20)
- Highest number of consecutive sold out games: 361 by Bayern Munich (matchday 20 of 2006–07 to matchday 6 of 2017–18)
- Highest number of consecutive sold out home games: 224 by Bayern Munich (matchday 21 of 2006–07 to matchday 25 of 2019–20)
- Highest number of consecutive sold out away games: 196 by Bayern Munich (matchday 22 of 2005–06 to matchday 5 of 2017–18)
- Highest number of consecutive games unbeaten in a calendar year: 33 by Bayern Munich (2013) (30 wins and 3 draws)

=== Participations ===
- Highest number of seasons in the Bundesliga: 62 by Bayern Munich and Werder Bremen
- Highest percentage of possible seasons in the Bundesliga: 96.88 by Bayern Munich and Werder Bremen
- Lowest number of relegations since the debut in the Bundesliga: 0 by Bayern Munich (since 1965–66), Bayer Leverkusen (since 1979–80), TSG Hoffenheim (since 2008–09), FC Augsburg (since 2011–12), RB Leipzig (since 2016–17), Union Berlin (since 2019–20) and SV Elversberg (since (2026–27)
- Lowest number of seasons in the Bundesliga since the league debut: 1 by Preußen Münster (1963–64), Tasmania 1900 Berlin (1965–66), Fortuna Köln (1973–74), Blau-Weiß Berlin (1986–87), VfB Leipzig (1993–94), SSV Ulm (1999–2000) and SV Elversberg (2026–27)
- Highest number of promotions to the Bundesliga: 8 by Arminia Bielefeld (1970, 1978, 1980, 1996, 1999, 2002, 2004 and 2020) and 1. FC Nürnberg (1978, 1980, 1985, 1998, 2001, 2004, 2009 and 2018)
- Highest number of relegations from the Bundesliga: 9 by 1. FC Nürnberg (1968–69, 1978–79, 1983–84, 1993–94, 1998–99, 2002–03, 2007–08, 2013–14 and 2018–19)

=== Attendances ===
- All-time highest home attendance: 44,795,770 by Borussia Dortmund
- All-time highest home attendance per game: 48,903 by Borussia Dortmund (in 916 Home games)
- Highest attendance in a season at home: 1,381,700 by Borussia Dortmund (2015–16)
- Highest average attendance per home game in a season: 81,226 by Borussia Dortmund (2015–16)
- Highest percentage of possible attendance in a home season: 100 by SC Freiburg (1995–96 and 2016–17), 1. FC Kaiserslautern (1997–98), Bayer Leverkusen (2002–03 to 2004–05), Mainz 05 (2004–05) and Bayern Munich (2005–06 and 2007–08 to 2018–19)
- Highest percentage of possible attendance in an away season: 100 by Bayern Munich (1999–2000, 2000–01, 2003–04, 2004–05, 2006–07 to 2016–17 and 2018–19)
- Highest percentage of possible attendance in a season: 100 by Bayern Munich (2007–08 to 2016–17 and 2018–19)
- Highest number of seasons with all games sold out: 11 by Bayern Munich (2007–08 to 2016–17 and 2018–19)
- Highest number of seasons with all home games sold out: 13 by Bayern Munich (2005–06 and 2007–08 to 2018–19)
- Highest number of seasons with all away games sold out: 16 by Bayern Munich (1999–2000, 2000–01, 2003–04, 2004–05, 2006–07 to 2016–17 and 2018–19)
- Highest number of seasons with at least one sold out game: 55 by Bayern Munich (1965–66, 1966–67, 1968–69 to 2019–20 and 2021–22)
- Highest number of seasons with at least one sold out game away: 54 by Bayern Munich (1965–66, 1966–67 and 1968–69 to 2019–20)
- Highest number of seasons with at least one sold out game at home: 50 by Bayern Munich (1965–66, 1966–67, 1970–71, 1972–73, 1974–75 to 1981–82, 1983–84 to 2019–20 and 2021–22)
- Highest number of sold out games: 792 by Bayern Munich
- Highest number of sold out games away: 474 by Bayern Munich
- Highest number of sold out games at home: 318 by Bayern Munich
- Highest percentage of sold out games: 57.14 by RB Leipzig (16 out of 28)
- Highest percentage of sold out games (at least 5 seasons): 44.85 by Bayern Munich (792 out of 1,766)
- Highest percentage of sold out home games: 71.43 by RB Leipzig (10 out of 14)
- Highest percentage of sold out home games (at least 5 seasons): 55.19 by Mainz 05 (101 out of 183)
- Highest percentage of sold out away games: 53.68 by Bayern Munich (474 out of 883)

== Player and manager records ==
Bold names are of those, who are currently active in the Bundeliga (in the respective category, which their records are relevant to). For example: A player only, if he is still playing and not, if he is, for example, coaching at the moment.

=== Appearances ===
- Highest number of appearances as a player and coach combined: 1,038 by Jupp Heynckes (369 as a player and 669 as a coach)
- Highest number of appearances as a coach: 836 by Otto Rehhagel
- Highest number of appearances as a player: 602 by Charly Körbel (played in 93.19% of his possible 646 games)
- Highest number of appearances for one club as a player and coach combined: 742 by Thomas Schaaf (262 as a player and 480 as a coach) for Werder Bremen
- Highest number of appearances as a coach for one club: 493 by Otto Rehhagel for Werder Bremen
- Highest number of appearances as a player for one club: 602 by Charly Körbel for Eintracht Frankfurt
- Highest number of appearances as a player for one club having not played for another club: 602 by Charly Körbel for Eintracht Frankfurt
- Highest number of appearances for a foreign player: 490 by Claudio Pizarro
- Youngest age for a player to appear: 16 years and 1 day by Youssoufa Moukoko for Borussia Dortmund against Hertha BSC (matchday 8 of 2020–21)
- Oldest age for a player to appear: 43 years and 184 days by Klaus Fichtel for Schalke 04 against Werder Bremen (matchday 34 of 1987–88)
- Youngest age for a coach to appear: 24 years and 47 days by Bernd Stöber for 1. FC Saarbrücken against 1. FC Köln (matchday 10 of 1976–77)
- Youngest age for a coach to appear (appointed as head coach): 28 years and 205 days by Julian Nagelsmann for TSG Hoffenheim against Werder Bremen (matchday 21 of 2015–16)
- Oldest age for a coach to appear: 74 years and 184 days by Alfred Schulz for Werder Bremen against VfB Stuttgart (matchday 34 of 1977–78)
- Oldest age for a player making his debut appearance: 38 years and 171 days by Richard Kress for Eintracht Frankfurt against 1. FC Kaiserslautern (matchday 1 of 1963–64)
- Oldest age for a coach making his debut appearance: 60 years and 36 days by Willi Multhaup for Werder Bremen against Borussia Dortmund (matchday 1 of 1963–64)
- Highest number of seasons with all games played: 13 by Sepp Maier
- Highest number of seasons with all games played for one club: 13 by Sepp Maier for Bayern Munich
- Highest number of seasons with all games played for one club, having not played for another club: 13 by Sepp Maier for Bayern Munich
- Highest number of seasons as a player and coach combined: 37 by Otto Rehhagel (8 as a player and 29 as a coach)
- Highest number of seasons as a player: 22 by Klaus Fichtel
- Highest number of seasons as a player for one club: 19 by Klaus Fichtel for Schalke 04, Manfred Kaltz for Hamburger SV and Charly Körbel for Eintracht Frankfurt
- Highest number of seasons as a player for one club having not played for another club: 19 by Charly Körbel for Eintracht Frankfurt
- Highest number of seasons as a coach: 29 by Otto Rehhagel
- Highest number of seasons for one club as a player and coach combined: 31 by Thomas Schaaf (15 as a player and 16 as a coach) for Werder Bremen
- Highest number of seasons as a coach for one club: 16 by Thomas Schaaf for Werder Bremen
- Highest number of different clubs coached: 8 by Jörg Berger (Fortuna Düsseldorf, Hannover 96, Eintracht Frankfurt, 1. FC Köln, Schalke 04, Karlsruher SC, Hansa Rostock and Arminia Bielefeld), Felix Magath (Hamburger SV, Werder Bremen, Eintracht Frankfurt, VfB Stuttgart, Bayern Munich, VfL Wolfsburg, Schalke 04 and Hertha BSC) and Otto Rehhagel (Kickers Offenbach, Werder Bremen, Borussia Dortmund, Arminia Bielefeld, Fortuna Düsseldorf, Bayern Munich, 1. FC Kaiserslautern and Hertha BSC)
- Highest number of different clubs played for: 7 by Michael Spies (VfB Stuttgart, Karlsruher SC, Borussia Mönchengladbach, Hansa Rostock, Hamburger SV, Dynamo Dresden and VfL Wolfsburg) and Sebastian Polter (VfL Wolfsburg, 1. FC Nürnberg, Mainz 05, Union Berlin, VfL Bochum, Schalke 04 and Darmstadt 98)
- Highest number of substitutions onto the field: 169 by Claudio Pizarro
- Highest number of substitutions from the field: 191 by Thomas Müller
- Highest number of substitutions from the field in a season: 29 by Patrick Herrmann (2013–14)
- Highest number of different players fielded in a season: 36 by Felix Magath for VfL Wolfsburg (2011–12)
- Lowest number of days as a coach before being sacked: 18 by Robert Körner at 1. FC Nürnberg (from 25 March to 12 April 1969)
- Youngest age for a player to reach 100 appearances: 20 years and 203 days by Timo Werner for RB Leipzig against 1. FC Köln (matchday 5 of 2016–17)
- Most coaches for one club in a season: 5 for Kickers Offenbach (1970–71), MSV Duisburg (1977–78) and Schalke 04 (2020–21)

=== Goals ===
- Highest number of goals scored: 365 by Gerd Müller
- Highest number of goals scored at home: 250 by Gerd Müller
- Highest number of goals scored away: 126 by Robert Lewandowski
- Highest number of goals scored for one club: 365 by Gerd Müller for Bayern Munich
- Highest number of goals scored for one club, playing for no other club: 365 by Gerd Müller for Bayern Munich
- Highest number of goals scored in a season: 41 by Robert Lewandowski (2020–21)
- Highest number of goals scored in a season at home: 27 by Gerd Müller (1972–73) and Robert Lewandowski (2020–21)
- Highest number of goals scored in a season away: 19 by Robert Lewandowski (2021–22)
- Highest number of goals scored in the opening half of a season: 22 by Robert Lewandowski (2020–21) and Harry Kane (2023–24)
- Highest number of goals scored in the closing half of a season: 23 by Gerd Müller (1971–72)
- Highest number of goals scored in a calendar year: 43 by Robert Lewandowski (2021)
- Highest number of goals scored in a league debut season: 36 by Harry Kane (2023–24)
- Highest number of goals scored in a game: 6 by Dieter Müller for 1. FC Köln against Werder Bremen (matchday 3 of 1977–78)
- Highest number of goals scored in a game by a substitute: 5 by Robert Lewandowski for Bayern Munich against VfL Wolfsburg (matchday 6 of 2015–16)
- Highest number of goals scored in first 100 appearances: 102 by Harry Kane
- Highest number of Top Scorer awards: 7 by Gerd Müller (1966–67, 1968–69, 1969–70, 1971–72 to 1973–74 and 1977–78) and Robert Lewandowski (2013–14, 2015–16 and 2017–18 to 2021–22)
- Highest number of Top Scorer awards for one club: 7 by Gerd Müller for Bayern Munich (1966–67, 1968–69, 1969–70, 1971–72 to 1973–74 and 1977–78)
- Highest number of goals scored by a foreign player: 312 by Robert Lewandowski
- Highest number of goals scored by a foreign player in a season: 41 by Robert Lewandowski (2020–21)
- Shortest elapsed timespan before a goal scored: 8 seconds by Robin Fellhauer for Augsburg against Bayern Munich (matchday 5 of 2026–27)
- Shortest elapsed timespan before a goal scored with the opposition kicking off: 9 seconds by Kevin Volland for TSG Hoffenheim against Bayern Munich (matchday 2 of 2015–16)
- Shortest elapsed timespan before a goal scored by a debutant: 17 seconds by Miloš Jojić for Borussia Dortmund against Eintracht Frankfurt (matchday 21 of 2013–14)
- Shortest elapsed timespan before a goal scored by a substitute: 13 seconds by Uwe Wassmer for SC Freiburg against Bayer Leverkusen (matchday 7 of 1996–97)
- Shortest elapsed timespan until a scored hat-trick: 4 minutes by Robert Lewandowski for Bayern Munich against VfL Wolfsburg (between minute 51 and 55 of matchday 6 of 2015–16)
- Shortest elapsed timespan until four goals scored: 6 minutes by Robert Lewandowski for Bayern Munich against VfL Wolfsburg (between minute 51 and 57 of matchday 6 of 2015–16)
- Shortest elapsed timespan until five goals scored: 9 minutes by Robert Lewandowski for Bayern Munich against VfL Wolfsburg (between minute 51 and 60 of matchday 6 of 2015–16)
- Youngest goalscorer: Youssoufa Moukoko for Borussia Dortmund against Union Berlin at 16 years and 28 days (matchday 13 of 2020–21)
- Oldest goalscorer: Claudio Pizarro for Werder Bremen against RB Leipzig at 40 years and 227 days (matchday 34 of 2018–19)
- Highest number of penalties scored: 53 by Manfred Kaltz (from 60 attempts)
- Highest number of goals scored by a goalkeeper: 26 by Hans-Jörg Butt (all penalties)
- Highest number of goals scored by a goalkeeper from open play: 1 by Jens Lehmann for Schalke 04 against Borussia Dortmund (matchday 20 of 1997–98), Frank Rost for Werder Bremen against Hansa Rostock (matchday 29 of 2001–02) and Marwin Hitz for FC Augsburg against Bayer Leverkusen (matchday 22 of 2014–15)
- Highest number of goals scored as a substitute: 34 by Nils Petersen
- Highest number of goals scored as a substitute in a season: 12 by Paco Alcácer (2018–19)
- Highest number of games without scoring before first goal: 266 by Dietmar Schwager (first goal on matchday 1 of 1973–74 in his 267th game)
- Highest number of games without scoring for an outfield player: 203 by Dennis Diekmeier
- Highest number of clean sheets by a goalkeeper in a season: 21 by Manuel Neuer (2015–16)
- Highest number of clean sheets by a goalkeeper: 248 by Manuel Neuer (in 549 games)
- Highest number of own goals scored: 6 by Manfred Kaltz and Nikolče Noveski
- Highest number of goals conceded by a goalkeeper: 829 by Eike Immel (in 534 games)
- Longest range from which a goal was scored: 82 metres by Moritz Stoppelkamp for SC Paderborn against Hannover 96 (matchday 4 of 2014–15)
- Most consecutive seasons with at least one goal scored: 16 by Willi Neuberger (1966–67 to 1981–82), Bernd Nickel (1967–68 to 1982–83), Holger Fach (1981–82 to 1996–97), Michael Zorc (1982–83 to 1997–98), Olaf Thon (1984–85 to 1999–2000) and Mats Hummels (2008–09 to 2023–24)

=== Assists ===
- Highest number of assists: 178 by Thomas Müller
- Highest number of assists in a season: 21 by Thomas Müller (2019–20) (Note: Although several sources stated Kevin De Bruyne held the Bundesliga assist record with 21 (with VfL Wolfsburg in 2014–15), this number has been disputed and in 2020, the Bundesliga website officially credited Müller with the record, placing De Bruyne's tally at 19 assists.)
- Highest number of assists in a season opening half: 13 by Thomas Müller (2021–22)

=== Championships ===
- Highest number of championships won overall: 13 by Thomas Müller and Manuel Neuer
- Highest number of championships won as a player: 13 by Thomas Müller and Manuel Neuer
- Highest number of championships won overall with one club: 13 by Thomas Müller and Manuel Neuer with Bayern Munich
- Highest number of championships won as a foreign player: 10 by David Alaba and Robert Lewandowski
- Highest number of championships won as a coach: 8 by Udo Lattek
- Highest percentage of possible championships as a coach: 100 by Pep Guardiola (3 championships in 3 seasons), Hansi Flick (2 championships in 2 seasons) and Vincent Kompany (2 championships in 2 seasons)
- Highest percentage of possible championships as a coach (at least 5 seasons): 53.33 by Udo Lattek (8 championships in 15 seasons) (Note: Not counting 1991 (1 game for 1. FC Köln as interim (he was sporting director at Köln at this particular moment in time) and 2000 (he was hired 5 games before the end of the season to prevent Borussia Dortmund of relegation, which he eventually went on doing), but counting 1970 (he was hired at 14 March 1970, but his then to be team was in a good position in the championship and had all chances but winning the league crown, which they actually didn't) and 1992–93 (in which he was sacked after the opening half by Schalke 04).)
- Highest number of championships won as both a player and coach: 8 by Jupp Heynckes (4 as a player and 4 as a coach)
- Youngest age for a coach to win a championship: 34 years and 241 days by Matthias Sammer
- Oldest age for a coach to win a championship: 73 years and 3 days by Jupp Heynckes
- Highest number of different clubs to become champions with as a player and coach combined: 3 by Felix Magath (Hamburger SV, Bayern Munich and VfL Wolfsburg)
- Highest number of different clubs to become champions with as a coach: 2 by Max Merkel (1860 Munich and 1. FC Nürnberg), Udo Lattek (Bayern Munich and Borussia Mönchengladbach), Hennes Weisweiler (Borussia Mönchengladbach and 1. FC Köln), Branko Zebec (Bayern Munich and Hamburger SV), Otto Rehhagel (Werder Bremen and 1. FC Kaiserslautern), Ottmar Hitzfeld (Borussia Dortmund and Bayern Munich) and Felix Magath (Bayern Munich and VfL Wolfsburg)
- Highest number of different clubs to become champions with as a player: 2 by August Starek (1. FC Nürnberg and Bayern Munich), Ludwig Müller (1. FC Nürnberg Borussia Mönchengladbach), Herbert Zimmermann (Bayern Munich and 1. FC Köln), Franz Beckenbauer (Bayern Munich and Hamburger SV), Holger Willmer (1. FC Köln and Bayern Munich), Karl Del'Haye (Borussia Mönchengladbach and Bayern Munich), Kurt Niedermayer (Bayern Munich and VfB Stuttgart), Ludwig Kögl (Bayern Munich and VfB Stuttgart), Bruno Labbadia (1. FC Kaiserslautern and Bayern Munich), Markus Schupp (1. FC Kaiserslautern and Bayern Munich), Stefan Reuter (Bayern Munich and Borussia Dortmund), Karlheinz Riedle (Werder Bremen and Borussia Dortmund), Matthias Sammer (VfB Stuttgart and Borussia Dortmund), Jürgen Kohler (Bayern Munich and Borussia Dortmund), Harald Schumacher (1. FC Köln and Borussia Dortmund), Andreas Brehme (Bayern Munich and 1. FC Kaiserslautern), Andreas Buck (VfB Stuttgart and 1. FC Kaiserslautern), Ciriaco Sforza (1. FC Kaiserslautern and Bayern Munich), Michael Ballack (1. FC Kaiserslautern and Bayern Munich), Andreas Reinke (1. FC Kaiserslautern and Werder Bremen), Marco Reich (1. FC Kaiserslautern and Werder Bremen), Valérien Ismaël (Werder Bremen and Bayern Munich), Markus Babbel (Bayern Munich and VfB Stuttgart), Ludovic Magnin (Werder Bremen and VfB Stuttgart), Zvjezdan Misimović (Bayern Munich and VfL Wolfsburg), Christian Gentner (VfB Stuttgart and VfL Wolfsburg), Mario Gómez (VfB Stuttgart and Bayern Munich), Markus Feulner (Bayern Munich and Borussia Dortmund), Antônio da Silva (VfB Stuttgart and Borussia Dortmund), Mario Götze (Borussia Dortmund and Bayern Munich), Robert Lewandowski (Borussia Dortmund and Bayern Munich), Serdar Tasci (VfB Stuttgart and Bayern Munich), Mats Hummels (Borussia Dortmund and Bayern Munich), Ivan Perišić (Borussia Dortmund and Bayern Munich), Josip Stanišić (Bayern Munich and Bayer Leverkusen) and Jonathan Tah (Bayer Leverkusen and Bayern Munich)
- Highest finishing position for a coach in a debut season (not including 1963–64): 1 by Branko Zebec with Bayern Munich (1968–69), Ernst Happel with Hamburger SV (1981–82), Franz Beckenbauer with Bayern Munich (1993–94), (Note: Franz Beckenbauer took over from Erich Ribbeck after the opening half of the 1993–94 season on 28 December 1993 (first training on 7 January 1994).) Louis van Gaal with Bayern Munich (2009–10), Pep Guardiola with Bayern Munich (2013–14), Carlo Ancelotti with Bayern Munich (2016–17), Hansi Flick with Bayern Munich (2019–20) and Vincent Kompany with Bayern Munich (2024–25)
- Highest finishing position for a coach in a debut season never been in the Bundesliga whatsoever before (not including 1963–64): 1 by Branko Zebec with Bayern Munich (1968–69), Ernst Happel with Hamburger SV (1981–82), Louis van Gaal with Bayern Munich (2009–10), Pep Guardiola with Bayern Munich (2013–14), Carlo Ancelotti with Bayern Munich (2016–17), Hansi Flick with Bayern Munich (2019–20) and Vincent Kompany with Bayern Munich (2024–25)
- Highest finishing position for a foreign coach in a debut season never been active in Germany whatsoever before: 1 by Ernst Happel with Hamburger SV (1981–82), Louis van Gaal with Bayern Munich (2009–10), Pep Guardiola with Bayern Munich (2013–14) and Carlo Ancelotti with Bayern Munich (2016–17)
- Highest finishing position for a coach in a debut season with a new club (not including 1963–64): 1 by Branko Zebec with Bayern Munich (1968–69) and Hamburger SV (1978–79), Udo Lattek with Borussia Mönchengladbach (1975–76), Ernst Happel with Hamburger SV (1981–82), Franz Beckenbauer with Bayern Munich (1993–94), (Note: Franz Beckenbauer was sporting director of Bayern Munich at the time he took over, so technically it was not at a new club, but he hasn't been coaching before in the Bundesliga, so coachingwise it was a new club.) Giovanni Trapattoni with Bayern Munich (1996–97), (Note: First season of Giovanni Trapattoni's second spell at Bayern Munich.) Otto Rehhagel with 1. FC Kaiserslautern (1997–98), (Note: Otto Rehhagel had been with 1. FC Kaiserslautern the season before, but that was in the 2. Bundesliga, so after he gained promotion with the club, the whole club was new to the Bundesliga (although having been to the Bundesliga in former times).) Ottmar Hitzfeld with Bayern Munich (1998–99), Felix Magath with Bayern Munich (2004–05), Louis van Gaal with Bayern Munich (2009–10), Pep Guardiola with Bayern Munich (2013–14), Carlo Ancelotti with Bayern Munich (2016–17), Niko Kovač with Bayern Munich (2018–19), Hansi Flick with Bayern Munich (2019–20), (Note: Hansi Flick took over from Niko Kovač after matchday 10 of the 2019–20 season on 3 November 2019 (first match on 9 November 2019).) Julian Nagelsmann with Bayern Munich (2021–22), Thomas Tuchel with Bayern Munich (2022–23) (Note: Thomas Tuchel took over from Julian Nagelsmann after matchday 25 of the 2022–23 season on 24 March 2023 (first match on 1 April 2023).) and Vincent Kompany with Bayern Munich (2024–25)
- Highest number of different clubs to win titles with as a coach in a debut season for the club: 2 by Branko Zebec with Bayern Munich (1968–69) and Hamburger SV (1978–79)
- Highest number of points for a coach in a debut season: 90 by Pep Guardiola with Bayern Munich (2013–14)
- Highest average of points per game for a coach: 2.52 by Pep Guardiola (257 points in 102 games)
- Becoming champion as a player and a coach: Helmut Benthaus (as a player with 1. FC Köln and as a coach with VfB Stuttgart), Jupp Heynckes (as a player with Borussia Mönchengladbach and as a coach with Bayern Munich), Franz Beckenbauer (as a player with Bayern Munich and Hamburger SV and as a coach with Bayern Munich), Matthias Sammer (as a player with VfB Stuttgart and as a player and coach with Borussia Dortmund), Thomas Schaaf (as a player and coach with Werder Bremen), Felix Magath (as a player with Hamburger SV and as a coach with Bayern Munich and VfL Wolfsburg), Niko Kovač (as a player and coach with Bayern Munich), Hansi Flick (as a player and coach with Bayern Munich) and Xabi Alonso (as a player with Bayern Munich and as a coach with Bayer Leverkusen)

=== Wins and losses ===
- Highest number of wins for a player: 377 by Manuel Neuer (still active)
- Highest number of wins for a player for one club: 362 by Thomas Müller with Bayern Munich
- Highest number of losses as a player: 221 by Bernard Dietz
- Highest number of losses as a player for one club: 220 by Charly Körbel for Eintracht Frankfurt (1972–73 to 1990–91)

=== Runs ===
- Highest number of consecutive titles, overall: 11 by Manuel Neuer and Thomas Müller (2012–13 to 2022–23) (all with Bayern Munich)
- Highest number of consecutive titles as a player: 11 by Manuel Neuer and Thomas Müller (2012–13 to 2022–23) (all with Bayern Munich)
- Highest number of consecutive titles as a coach: 3 by Udo Lattek (1971–72 to 1973–74 and 1984–85 to 1986–87), Ottmar Hitzfeld (1998–99 to 2000–01) and Pep Guardiola (2013–14 to 2015–16) (all titles with Bayern Munich)
- Highest number of different clubs to win consecutive titles with overall: 2 by August Starek with 1. FC Nürnberg (1967–68) and Bayern Munich (1968–69) and Josip Stanišić with Bayern Munich (2022–23) and Bayer Leverkusen (2023–24)
- Highest number of different clubs to win consecutive titles with as a player: 2 by August Starek with 1. FC Nürnberg (1967–68) and Bayern Munich (1968–69) and Josip Stanišić with Bayern Munich (2022–23) and Bayer Leverkusen (2023–24)
- Highest number of consecutive titles as a coach from debut season: 3 by Pep Guardiola with Bayern Munich (2013–14 to 2015–16)
- Highest number of consecutive titles as a coach from debut season with a new club: 3 by Ottmar Hitzfeld (1998–99 to 2000–01) and Pep Guardiola (2013–14 to 2015–16) (both with Bayern Munich)
- Highest number of consecutive games scoring in: 16 by Gerd Müller for Bayern Munich (23 goals from matchday 6 to 25 of 1969–70) (Note: Gerd Müller was not included in the squad for the 14th matchday; matchdays 18, 19 and 24 had been rescheduled and were all played after Müller's streak.)
- Highest number of consecutive games (and matchdays) scoring in from start of the season: 11 by Robert Lewandowski for Bayern Munich (16 goals from matchday 1 to 11 of 2019–20)
- Highest number of consecutive matchdays scoring in: 11 by Robert Lewandowski for Bayern Munich (16 goals from matchday 1 to 11 of 2019–20)
- Highest number of consecutive games (and matchdays) scoring in from debut for a new club: 6 by Mohamed Zidan for Mainz 05 (6 goals from matchday 20 to 25 of 2011–12)
- Highest number of consecutive home games scoring in: 13 by Robert Lewandowski for Bayern Munich (24 goals from matchday 12 of 2020–21 to matchday 5 of 2021–22) (Note: Robert Lewandowski was not included in the squad for the 28th and 30th matchdays of the 2020–21 season due to injury.)
- Highest number of consecutive goals scored by penalties: 17 by Hans-Jörg Butt for Hamburger SV (1999 to 2001)
- Highest number of consecutive conceded goals by penalties from first penalty against him: 18 by Sepp Maier for Bayern Munich
- Highest number of consecutive top scorer awards: 5 by Robert Lewandowski of Bayern Munich (2017–18 to 2021–22)
- Highest number of consecutive games played: 442 by Sepp Maier (matchday 1 of 1966–67 to matchday 34 of 1978–79)
- Highest number of consecutive games played for one club: 442 by Sepp Maier for Bayern Munich (matchday 1 of 1966–67 to matchday 34 of 1978–79)
- Highest number of consecutive games played for one club, playing for no other club: 442 by Sepp Maier for Bayern Munich (matchday 1 of 1966–67 to matchday 34 of 1978–79)
- Highest number of consecutive seasons with all games played: 13 by Sepp Maier (1966–67 to 1978–79)
- Highest number of consecutive games played playing all minutes: 245 by Sepp Maier (matchday 28 of 1971–72 to matchday 34 of 1978–79)
- Highest number of consecutive games played playing all minutes by an outfield player: 241 by Manfred Binz (matchday 28 of 1986–87 to matchday 25 of 1993–94) (Note: Matchday 27 of 1986–87 was played between matchday 28 and 29)
- Highest number of consecutive games won as a player from debut in the Bundesliga: 10 by Robert Kovač (1996–97) and Isaac Vorsah (2008–09)
- Highest number of consecutive games won as a player when scoring in them: 87 by Thomas Müller (2011 to 2019)
- Highest number of consecutive games unbeaten as a player: 56 by Jérôme Boateng (2012 to 2014)
- Highest number of consecutive games unbeaten as a player from debut in the Bundesliga: 39 by Javi Martínez (2012 to 2014)
- Highest number of consecutive games unbeaten as a coach: 36 by Ernst Happel (matchday 17 of 1981–82 to matchday 18 of 1982–83)
- Highest number of consecutive games unbeaten as a coach from debut in the Bundesliga: 28 by Pep Guardiola (matchday 1 to 28 of 2013–14)
- Highest number of consecutive games unbeaten as a coach from debut at a new club: 28 by Pep Guardiola (matchday 1 to 28 of 2013–14) with Bayern Munich
- Longest period of time unbeaten as a player: 2 years and 93 days by Jérôme Boateng (28 October 2012 to 29 January 2015)
- Highest number of consecutive games with a clean sheet by a goalkeeper: 9 by Timo Hildebrand for VfB Stuttgart (matchday 34 of 2002–03 to matchday 8 of 2003–04)
- Highest number of consecutive games with a clean sheet by a goalkeeper in a season: 8 by Oliver Kahn for Bayern Munich (matchday 17, 12 and 18 to 23 of 1998–99), Timo Hildebrand for VfB Stuttgart (matchday 1 to 8 of 2003–04) and Manuel Neuer for Bayern Munich (matchday 2 to 9 of 2011–12)
- Highest number of consecutive games with a clean sheet by a goalkeeper from start of the season: 8 by Timo Hildebrand for VfB Stuttgart (2003–04)
- Highest number of consecutive minutes without conceding by a goalkeeper: 884 by Timo Hildebrand for VfB Stuttgart (minute 76 of matchday 33 of 2002–03 to minute 59 of matchday 9 of 2003–04)
- Highest number of consecutive games with a clean sheet by a goalkeeper from debut: 4 by Timo Horn for 1. FC Köln (matchday 1 to 4 of 2014–15)
- Highest number of consecutive minutes without conceding by a goalkeeper from debut: 365 by Timo Horn for 1. FC Köln (minute 1 of matchday 1 to minute 6 of matchday 5 of 2014–15)
- Highest number of consecutive seasons as coach for one club: 15 by Thomas Schaaf for Werder Bremen (1999 to 2013)
- Highest number of consecutive appearances as coach for one club: 480 by Otto Rehhagel for Werder Bremen (1981–82 to 1994–95)
- Highest number of consecutive seasons overall: 22 by Klaus Fichtel (1965–66 to 1987–88)
- Highest number of consecutive seasons as a player: 22 by Klaus Fichtel (1965–66 to 1987–88)
- Highest number of consecutive seasons as a player for one club: 19 by Charly Körbel for Eintracht Frankfurt (1972–73 to 1990–91)
- Highest number of consecutive seasons as a player for one club, having not played for another club: 19 by Charly Körbel for Eintracht Frankfurt (1972–73 to 1990–91)
- Highest number of consecutive seasons as a coach: 15 by Otto Rehhagel for Werder Bremen (1981–82 to 1994–95) and Bayern Munich (1995 to 1996) and Thomas Schaaf for Werder Bremen (1999 to 2013)
- Highest number of consecutive seasons as a coach for one club: 15 by Thomas Schaaf for Werder Bremen (1999 to 2013)
- Highest number of consecutive seasons as a coach from league debut: 15 by Thomas Schaaf for Werder Bremen (1999 to 2013)
- Highest number of consecutive seasons as a coach for one club from league debut: 15 by Thomas Schaaf for Werder Bremen (1999 to 2013)
- Longest period of time as a coach for one club: 14 years and 5 days by Thomas Schaaf for Werder Bremen (10 May 1999 to 14 May 2013)
- Longest period of time as a coach for one club from league debut: 14 years and 5 days by Thomas Schaaf for Werder Bremen (10 May 1999 to 14 May 2013)
- Longest period of time as a coach for one club, including relegations: 15 years and 364 days by Volker Finke for SC Freiburg (1 July 1991 until 30 June 2007) (spell included 5 seasons in 2. Bundesliga)

=== Cards ===
- Highest number of cards received: 121 by Stefan Effenberg (114 yellow, 4 yellow-red and 3 red cards)
- Highest number of yellow-red cards received: 7 by Luiz Gustavo
- Highest number of straight red cards received: 5 by Jens Nowotny, Torsten Wohlert, Maurizio Gaudino, Vedad Ibišević, Fernando Meira and Jérôme Boateng
- Highest number of red cards received overall: 9 by Dominik Kohr
- Highest number of red cards received in a season: 3 by Bernhard Trares (1994–95), Marcelo Bordon (2001–02), Josip Šimunić (2006–07), Aleksandar Vasoski (2006–07), Luiz Gustavo (2013–14), Granit Xhaka (2015–16), Jean-Philippe Gbamin (2016–17), Maxence Lacroix (2021–22 and 2023–24) and Piero Hincapié (2022–23)
- Highest number of yellow cards received: 114 by Stefan Effenberg
- Highest number of yellow cards received in a season: 17 by Klaus Gjasula (2019–20)
- Shortest elapsed timespan before receiving a red card: 43 seconds (after being substituted onto the pitch) by Marcel Titsch-Rivero of Eintracht Frankfurt (matchday 34 of 2010–11)
- Shortest elapsed timespan before receiving a red card, following the second booking: 12 minutes (into the game) by Mame Biram Diouf of Hannover 96 (matchday 10 of 2013–14)

=== Penalties ===
- Highest number of penalties made: 53 by Manfred Kaltz (out of 60 attempts)
- Highest number of made penalties with no miss: 16 by Hans-Joachim Abel and Max Kruse
- Highest number of missed penalties: 12 by Gerd Müller (out of 63 attempts)
- Highest number of saved penalties: 7 by Koen Casteels and Oliver Baumann

== League records ==
=== Goals ===
- Highest number of goals scored in a season: 1,097 in 306 games (1983–84) (3.58 goals per game)
- Lowest number of goals scored in a season: 790 in 306 games (1989–90) (2.58 goals per game)
- Highest number of goals scored on a single matchday: 53 (matchday 32 of 1983–84)
- Lowest number of goals scored on a single matchday: 11 (matchday 26 of 1989–90 and matchday 20 of 1998–99)

=== Results ===
- Highest number of wins away on a single matchday: 7 (matchday 2 of 2010–11)
- Most frequent result: 1–1 (12% of all matches)
- Highest number of goals in a game: 12 at
  - Borussia Mönchengladbach 12–0 Borussia Dortmund (matchday 34 of 1977–78)
  - Borussia Dortmund 11–1 Arminia Bielefeld (1982–83)
  - Bayern Munich 11–1 Borussia Dortmund (1971–72)
  - Borussia Dortmund 9–3 1. FC Kaiserslautern (1963–64)
  - 1. FC Köln 8–4 Tennis Borussia Berlin (1976–77)

=== Penalties ===
- Highest number of penalties awarded in a game: 5 at Borussia Mönchengladbach v. Borussia Dortmund (3 for Gladbach and 2 for Dortmund) (matchday 5 of 1965–66)
- Highest number of missed penalties in a game: 3 at 1. FC Nürnberg v. Eintracht Braunschweig (2 by Braunschweig and 1 by Nürnberg) (matchday 22 of 2013–14)
- Highest number of missed penalties in a game, no penalties made: 3 at 1. FC Nürnberg v. Eintracht Braunschweig (2 by Braunschweig and 1 by Nürnberg) (matchday 22 of 2013–14)

=== Attendances ===
- Highest attendance in a game: 88,075 by Hertha BSC against 1. FC Köln (matchday 6 of 1969–70)
- Lowest attendance in a game: 827 by Tasmania Berlin against Borussia Mönchengladbach (matchday 19 of 1965–66) (Note: Does not include matches played behind closed doors as a result of the COVID-19 pandemic.)
- Highest average attendance per game in a season: 45,116 in 2011–12
- Highest attendance in a season: 13.805.496 in 2011–12
- Highest number of sold out games in a season: 169 in 2010–11
- Highest percentage of sold out games in a season: 55.23 in 2010–11

=== Matches ===
- Most frequent matchup: 118 times, Bayern Munich v. Werder Bremen (in 59 seasons)
- Highest number of matches played in a season: 380 (1991–92, with 20 teams competing)
- Lowest number of matches played in a season: 240 (1963–64 and 1964–65, with 16 teams competing)

=== Cards ===
- Highest number of red cards on a single matchday: 8 (matchday 3 of 2013–14)
- Highest number of cards in a game: 13 (10 yellow cards, 2 straight red cards and 1 red card for second booking), Borussia Dortmund v. Bayern Munich (matchday 28 of 2000–01)
- Highest number of red cards in a season: 98 (1994–95)

=== Finances ===
- Highest total revenue: €3,244,330,000 (2015–16)
- Highest operational profit: €695,160,000 (2015–16)
- Highest profit: €206,183,000 (2015–16)
- Highest transfer fee paid: €100 million for Harry Kane (2023 from Tottenham Hotspur to Bayern Munich)
- Highest transfer fee received: €130 million for Ousmane Dembélé (2017 from Borussia Dortmund to Barcelona)
- Highest transfer fee for a move between Bundesliga clubs: €55 million for Nathaniel Brown (2026 from Eintracht Frankfurt to Bayern Munich)
