= Erwin Hadewicz =

German footballer

Personal information
- Date of birth: 2 April 1951 (age 75)
- Place of birth: Ellwangen, West Germany
- Height: 1.75 m (5 ft 9 in)
- Position: Midfielder

Team information
- Current team: VfB Stuttgart (scout)

Youth career
- 1968–1969: SV Reindelbach
- 1969–1970: TSV Ellwangen
- 1970–1973: VfR Aalen

Senior career*
Years	Team	Apps	(Gls)
1973–1975	FC Bayern Munich	19	(0)
1975–1983	VfB Stuttgart	233	(18)
1983–1985	FC Baden		
1985–1986	VfR Aalen		

International career
1978	West Germany B	2	(0)

Managerial career
- 1985–1987: VfR Aalen
- 1989–1990: VfR Aalen
- * Club domestic league appearances and goals

Erwin Hadewicz (born 2 April 1951) is a retired German football player. He spent nine seasons in the Bundesliga with FC Bayern Munich and VfB Stuttgart. As of May 2011, he works as a scout for VfB Stuttgart.

== Honours ==
- European Cup winner: 1973–74
- Bundesliga champion: 1973–74
