= 1973–74 Bundesliga =

11th season of the Bundesliga

Bundesliga
- Season: 1973–74
- Dates: 11 August 1973 – 18 May 1974
- Champions: Bayern Munich; 4th Bundesliga title 5th German title
- Relegated: SC Fortuna Köln; Hannover 96
- European Cup: FC Bayern Munich
- Cup Winners' Cup: Eintracht Frankfurt
- UEFA Cup: Borussia Mönchengladbach; Fortuna Düsseldorf; 1. FC Köln; Hamburger SV (losing DFB-Pokal finalists to Frankfurt)
- Goals: 1,069
- Average goals/game: 3.49
- Top goalscorer: Jupp Heynckes (30); Gerd Müller (30)
- Biggest home win: M'gladbach 7–1 Wuppertal (26 January 1974); M'gladbach 6–0 Schalke (1 September 1973); Frankfurt 6–0 Essen (30 March 1974)
- Biggest away win: Hamburg 0–5 FC Bayern (4 May 1974)
- Highest scoring: K'lautern 7–4 FC Bayern (11 goals) (20 October 1973)

The 1973–74 Bundesliga was the 11th season of the Bundesliga, West Germany's premier football league. It began on 11 August 1973 and ended on 18 May 1974. FC Bayern Munich were the defending champions.

== Competition modus ==
Every team played two games against each other team, one at home and one away. Teams received two points for a win and one point for a draw. If two or more teams were tied on points, places were determined by goal difference and, if still tied, by goals scored. The team with the most points were crowned champions while the two teams with the fewest points were relegated to their respective 2. Bundesliga divisions.

== Team changes to 1972–73 ==
Eintracht Braunschweig and Rot-Weiß Oberhausen were relegated to the Regionalliga after finishing in the last two places. Both teams were replaced by Fortuna Köln and Rot-Weiss Essen, who won their respective promotion play-off groups.

== Team overview ==
Location of teams in Bundesliga 1973–74

Club	Ground	Capacity
Hertha BSC Berlin	Olympiastadion	100,000
VfL Bochum	Ruhrstadion	40,000
SV Werder Bremen	Weserstadion	32,000
MSV Duisburg	Wedaustadion	38,500
Fortuna Düsseldorf	Rheinstadion	59,600
Rot-Weiss Essen	Georg-Melches-Stadion	40,000
Eintracht Frankfurt	Waldstadion	87,000
Hamburger SV	Volksparkstadion	80,000
Hannover 96	Niedersachsenstadion	86,000
1. FC Kaiserslautern	Stadion Betzenberg	42,000
1. FC Köln	Radrennbahn Müngersdorf	29,000
SC Fortuna Köln	Radrennbahn Müngersdorf	29,000
Borussia Mönchengladbach	Bökelbergstadion	34,500
FC Bayern Munich	Olympiastadion	70,000
Kickers Offenbach	Bieberer Berg	30,000
FC Schalke 04	Parkstadion	70,000
VfB Stuttgart	Neckarstadion	53,000
Wuppertaler SV	Stadion am Zoo	28,000

== League table ==
Pos	Team	Pld	W	D	L	GF	GA	GD	Pts	Qualification or relegation
1	Bayern Munich (C)	34	20	9	5	95	53	+42	49	Qualification to European Cup first round
2	Borussia Mönchengladbach	34	21	6	7	93	52	+41	48	Qualification to UEFA Cup first round
3	Fortuna Düsseldorf	34	16	9	9	61	47	+14	41	Qualification to UEFA Cup first round
4	Eintracht Frankfurt	34	15	11	8	63	50	+13	41	Qualification to Cup Winners' Cup first round
5	1. FC Köln	34	16	7	11	69	56	+13	39	Qualification to UEFA Cup first round
6	1. FC Kaiserslautern	34	15	8	11	80	69	+11	38	
7	Schalke 04	34	16	5	13	72	68	+4	37	
8	Hertha BSC	34	11	11	12	56	60	−4	33	
9	VfB Stuttgart	34	12	7	15	58	57	+1	31	
10	Kickers Offenbach	34	11	9	14	56	62	−6	31	
11	Werder Bremen	34	9	13	12	48	56	−8	31	
12	Hamburger SV	34	13	5	16	53	62	−9	31	Qualification to UEFA Cup first round (Note: As Eintracht Frankfurt qualified for the Cup Winners' Cup, their UEFA Cup spot was transferred to DFB-Pokal runners-up Hamburger SV.)
13	Rot-Weiss Essen	34	10	11	13	56	70	−14	31	
14	VfL Bochum	34	9	12	13	45	57	−12	30	
15	MSV Duisburg	34	11	7	16	42	56	−14	29	
16	Wuppertaler SV	34	8	9	17	42	65	−23	25	
17	Fortuna Köln (R)	34	8	9	17	46	79	−33	25	Relegation to 2. Bundesliga
18	Hannover 96 (R)	34	6	10	18	50	66	−16	22	Relegation to 2. Bundesliga

Source: www.dfb.de
Rules for classification: 1) points; 2) goal difference; 3) number of goals scored.
(C) Champions; (R) Relegated

== Results ==
Home \ Away	BSC	BOC	SVW	DUI	F95	RWE	SGE	HSV	H96	FCK	KOE	FKO	BMG	FCB	KOF	S04	VFB	WSV
Hertha BSC	—	4–2	0–0	2–4	2–0	1–1	2–1	2–1	4–2	3–1	2–2	1–1	3–4	2–2	2–2	1–0	1–0	3–0
VfL Bochum	2–1	—	0–0	3–0	3–3	1–2	1–1	2–0	3–1	2–2	0–2	2–0	1–1	0–1	4–1	2–5	0–0	2–1
Werder Bremen	4–1	1–0	—	1–2	0–0	1–1	1–2	1–1	3–3	3–1	4–2	2–0	2–3	1–1	0–2	2–1	1–1	3–0
MSV Duisburg	1–1	0–0	3–1	—	0–1	1–0	1–1	0–0	1–1	2–1	5–1	1–3	1–2	0–4	4–0	2–0	1–0	0–0
Fortuna Düsseldorf	1–1	1–1	1–1	2–1	—	3–0	1–0	2–0	2–0	2–5	3–0	5–1	1–0	4–2	3–3	0–1	2–0	2–0
Rot-Weiss Essen	3–2	2–2	3–1	4–2	1–4	—	6–3	1–1	1–1	3–3	1–1	0–2	2–6	0–1	1–2	2–5	3–3	2–1
Eintracht Frankfurt	2–0	3–1	1–1	3–0	2–1	6–0	—	1–0	1–1	3–1	2–1	4–2	1–0	1–1	2–2	2–1	4–3	1–0
Hamburger SV	0–2	5–0	3–0	2–0	1–3	2–3	4–2	—	1–4	0–2	3–1	4–0	1–0	0–5	0–0	5–2	1–0	2–1
Hannover 96	3–1	1–2	0–1	2–2	1–2	1–2	0–0	2–2	—	4–2	1–0	1–1	0–2	3–1	2–3	0–1	3–0	1–1
1. FC Kaiserslautern	3–1	0–2	2–2	2–1	3–2	0–0	1–4	1–4	2–1	—	1–2	2–1	2–4	7–4	3–0	4–0	4–0	4–0
1. FC Köln	3–4	2–2	2–0	5–1	4–2	3–2	1–1	1–2	2–1	3–1	—	5–0	0–1	4–3	2–0	3–1	5–2	0–0
Fortuna Köln	3–3	2–2	1–3	3–0	1–1	1–3	3–2	3–0	2–2	3–3	0–2	—	3–5	0–3	2–1	1–1	1–0	2–1
Borussia Mönchengladbach	1–1	2–0	3–1	3–2	1–2	2–2	0–0	6–1	4–3	2–2	1–1	3–1	—	5–0	5–1	6–0	3–1	7–1
Bayern Munich	3–1	4–0	2–2	4–2	3–1	2–0	2–2	4–1	5–1	1–1	4–1	5–1	4–3	—	1–0	5–1	3–0	3–0
Kickers Offenbach	1–1	2–2	4–0	2–0	3–0	1–1	5–2	2–5	2–1	2–3	1–2	4–0	2–3	2–2	—	1–2	2–1	0–1
Schalke 04	3–0	3–1	4–2	0–1	4–2	3–1	3–1	3–1	3–1	3–3	2–2	6–1	2–0	5–5	0–2	—	2–3	4–2
VfB Stuttgart	2–0	2–0	2–2	0–1	0–0	0–3	3–1	3–0	5–1	3–4	2–1	2–1	6–1	1–1	4–0	3–0	—	2–2
Wuppertaler SV	2–1	2–0	4–1	2–0	2–2	2–0	1–1	3–0	2–1	2–4	1–3	0–0	2–4	1–4	1–1	1–1	3–4	—

Source: DFB
Legend: Blue = home team win; Yellow = draw; Red = away team win.

== Top goalscorers ==
30 goals

- (Germany) Jupp Heynckes (Borussia Mönchengladbach)
- (Germany) Gerd Müller (FC Bayern Munich)

21 goals

- (Germany) Klaus Fischer (FC Schalke 04)
- (Germany) Klaus Toppmöller (1. FC Kaiserslautern)

19 goals

- (Sweden) Roland Sandberg (1. FC Kaiserslautern)

18 goals

- (Germany) Uli Hoeneß (FC Bayern Munich)

17 goals

- (Germany) Hermann Ohlicher (VfB Stuttgart)
- (Germany) Dieter Müller (1. FC Köln)

16 goals

- (Germany) Reiner Geye (Fortuna Düsseldorf)
- (Germany) Hannes Löhr (1. FC Köln)
- (Germany) Günter Pröpper (Wuppertaler SV)

== Champion squad ==
FC Bayern Munich
Goalkeeper: Sepp Maier (34).

Defenders: Franz Beckenbauer (34 / 4); Hans-Georg Schwarzenbeck (33 / 7); Johnny Hansen (Denmark) (32 / 1); Paul Breitner (26 / 7); Gernot Rohr (3).
Midfielders: Uli Hoeneß (34 / 18); Franz Roth (33 / 8); Rainer Zobel (28 / 5); Jupp Kapellmann (20 / 2); Erwin Hadewicz (12); Viggo Jensen (Denmark) (5).
Forwards: Gerd Müller (34 / 30); Bernd Dürnberger (30 / 8); Conny Torstensson (Sweden) (16 / 1); Wilhelm Hoffmann (15 / 2); Bernd Gersdorff (12 / 2); Edgar Schneider (7); Herbert Zimmermann (1).
(league appearances and goals listed in brackets)

Manager: Udo Lattek.

On the roster but have not played in a league game: Walter Modick; Hugo Robl; Georg Weiß; Torben Hansen; Norbert Ivangean; Dušan Jovanović (Socialist Federal Republic of Yugoslavia) .

== See also ==
- 1973–74 DFB-Pokal
