= Uli Hoeneß =

German football player and executive

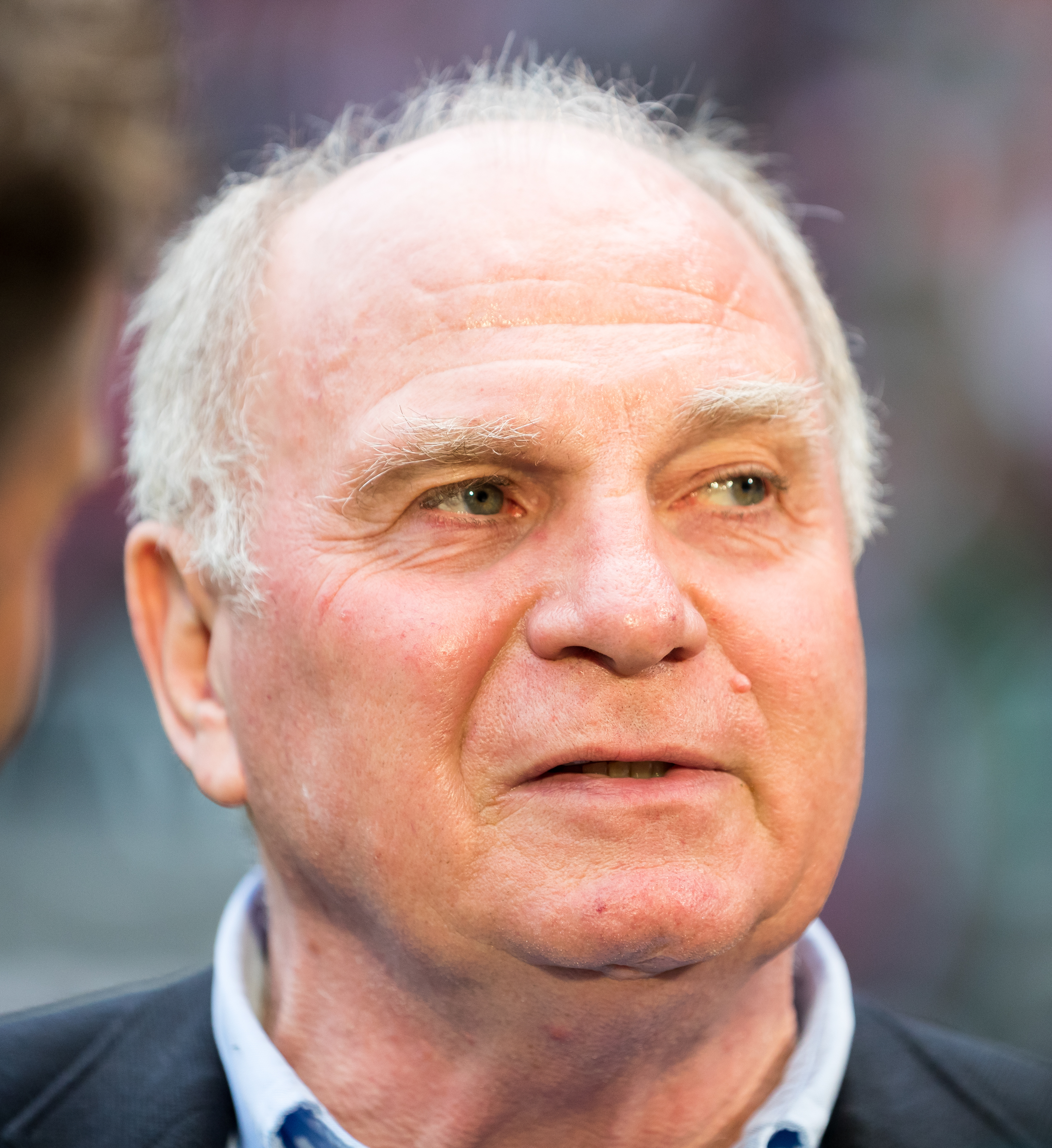
- Hoeneß in 2019

Personal information
- Full name: Ulrich Hoeneß
- Date of birth: 5 January 1952 (age 74)
- Place of birth: Ulm, West Germany
- Height: 1.81 m (5 ft 11 in)
- Position: Forward

Team information
- Current team: Bayern Munich (honorary president)

Youth career
- 1959–1965: VfB Ulm
- 1965–1970: TSG Ulm 1846

Senior career*
Years	Team	Apps	(Gls)
1970–1979	Bayern Munich	239	(86)
1978–1979	→ 1. FC Nürnberg (loan)	11	(0)
Total		250	(86)

International career
1968–1970	West Germany Youth	17	(5)
1969–1972	West Germany Amateur	22	(3)
1971–1973	West Germany U23	2	(1)
1972–1976	West Germany	35	(5)
Medal record
Men's football
Representing West Germany
FIFA World Cup
Winner	1974 West Germany
UEFA European Championship
Winner	1972 Belgium
Runner-up	1976 Yugoslavia
- * Club domestic league appearances and goals

Ulrich "Uli" Hoeneß (German pronunciation: [ˈuli ˈhøːnɛs]; born 5 January 1952) is a German football executive and former professional player who played as a forward. He played for West Germany at one World Cup and two European Championships, winning one tournament of each competition. During his playing career, he was primarily associated with Bayern Munich, where he won three Bundesliga titles and three European Cups.

Hoeneß later served as Bayern Munich's general manager for 30 years until 2009 and eventually as the club's president from 2009 to 2014 and from 2016 to 2019. In 2014, he pleaded guilty to tax evasion, ultimately serving 18 months in prison for the offence.

== Early life and education ==
Ulrich Hoeneß was born on 5 January 1952 in Ulm, Württemberg-Baden, West Germany. He grew up in a conservative, Catholic-influenced family as the son of master butcher Erwin Hoeneß and his wife, Paula, in Ulm. He attended the Hans-Multscher-Grundschule before transferring to the Schubart-Gymnasium, both located in Ulm. Along with his younger brother Dieter, who also later became a professional footballer and manager, he began playing football in the youth department of VfB Ulm. He later transferred to TSG Ulm 1846 (now SSV Ulm 1846). At the age of 15, he became captain of the DFB's school selection team. During training camps of the South German A-Youth team at the Schöneck sports school in Baden, he shared a room with Paul Breitner for the first time. A close friendship developed between the player from the Baden-Württemberg youth selection and the player from the Bavaria selection. Later, they moved into their first shared apartment in the Munich district of Trudering. In 1971, Hoeneß graduated from the Schubart-Gymnasium in Ulm. He was exempted from military service because wearing a combat helmet caused him head and knee pain.

Hoeneß graduated with an average grade of 2.4. Initially, he intended to study business administration in the winter semester of 1971–72. At the time, to be admitted to this program at LMU Munich, applicants needed an average grade of at least 3.0. However, non-Bavarian applicants were penalized with a one-grade reduction. As a result, Hoeneß was unable to study this subject there (though he could elsewhere). He decided to study English and history for teaching instead but dropped out after two semesters.

== Club career ==
In 1970, he played as a left-sided forward with amateur club TSG Ulm 1846 and was recruited by Udo Lattek, then manager of Bundesliga club Bayern Munich. Hoeneß immediately made an impact, scoring six times in 31 matches as the Bavarians finished in second position behind Borussia Mönchengladbach, and adding the domestic cup.

During his eight-and-a-half-year stint with Bayern, Hoeneß enjoyed great success, winning a total of eight major titles, including three league titles and as many European Cups. In the 1973–74 edition of the latter competition, the final replay against Atlético Madrid, he produced one of his most outstanding performances, scoring two goals in the 4–0 victory. However, in the final of the following year's European Cup suffered an injury to his right knee from which he never fully recovered.

In late 1978, Hoeneß was loaned to Bayern's neighbors 1. FC Nürnberg, where it was hoped he could get more match practice. His recovery failed, however, and he was forced to hang up his boots at the age of just 27. He had appeared in 250 matches in Germany's top division, netting 86 times.

== International career ==
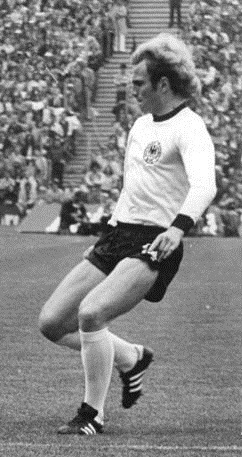
Hoeneß with the Germany national team, 1974

Hoeneß played 35 times for West Germany. His debut came on 29 March 1972; he scored the final goal in a 2–0 friendly win in Hungary.

As one of six Bayern players in the German squad, Hoeneß won both UEFA Euro 1972 and the 1974 FIFA World Cup. In the final of the latter, against Holland, he committed a foul on Johan Cruyff in the opening minute that led to a goal from the subsequent penalty, but West Germany came from behind to win 2–1. He also played with the national side in Euro 1976 in Yugoslavia, where he missed the decisive West German shot in the penalty shootout loss against Czechoslovakia, skying it over the crossbar. He would be the only German player to miss a penalty in a shootout at the European Championships until Thomas Müller, Mesut Özil and Bastian Schweinsteiger all missed against Italy in the quarterfinals of UEFA Euro 2016.

Hoeneß had retained his amateur status until 1972, allowing him to take part in that year's Summer Olympic Games. There, he played alongside future Bayern coach Ottmar Hitzfeld as West Germany failed to qualify for the semifinals of the tournament, losing 3–2 to East Germany, a match in which Hoeneß scored his only goal of the tournament. This historic match was also the first between West Germany and East Germany.

== Bayern Munich management ==
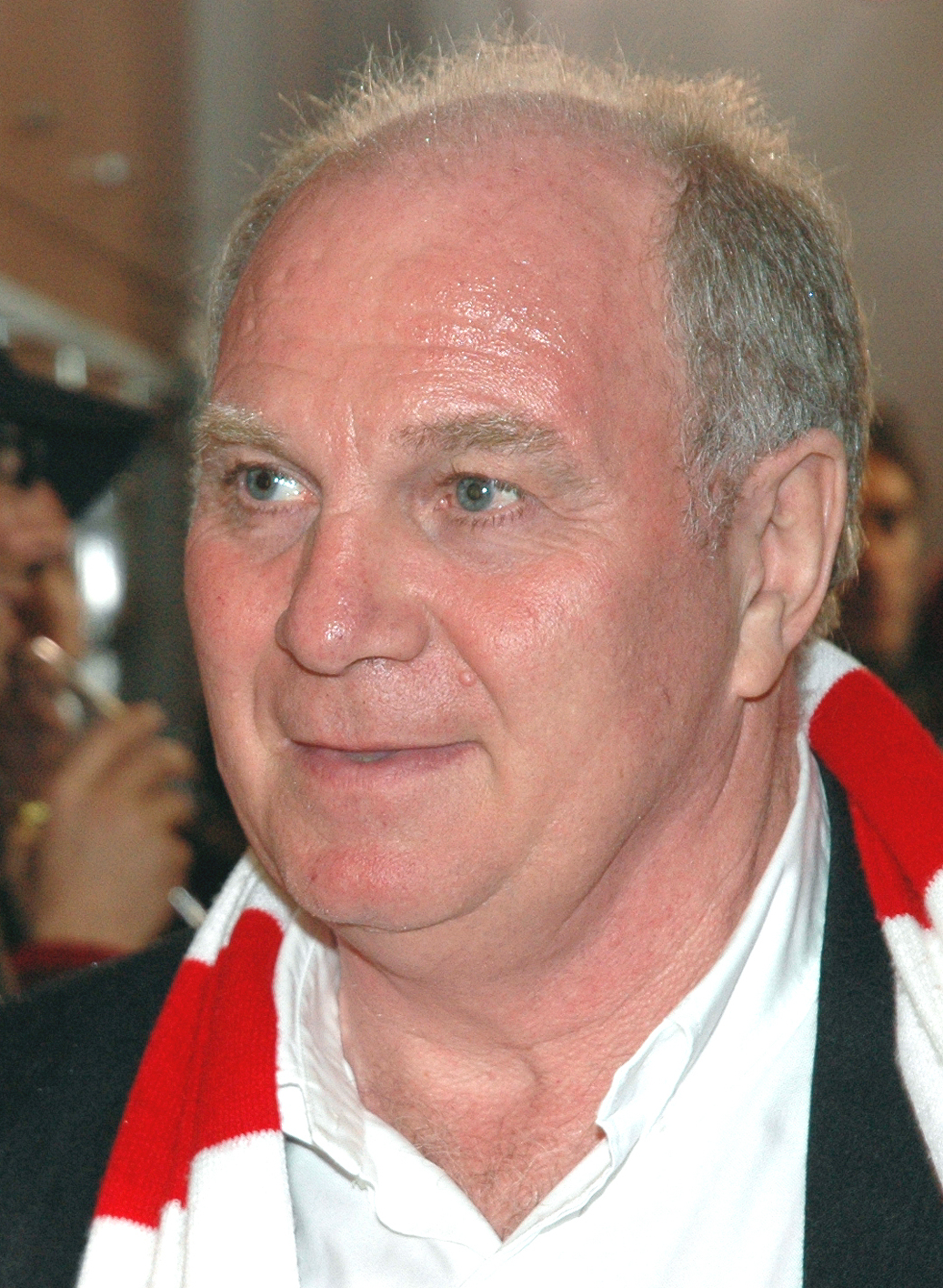
Hoeneß in 2013

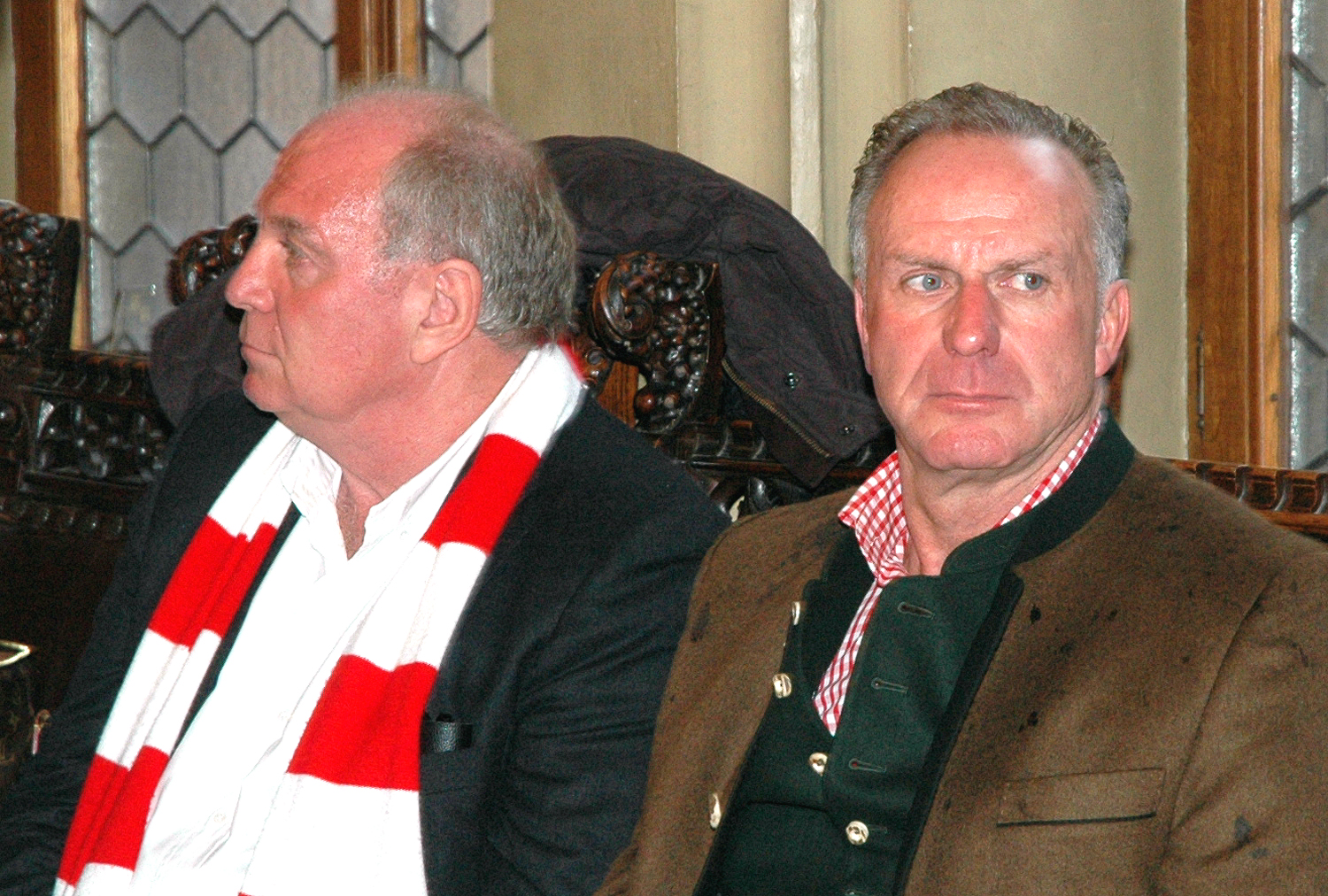
Hoeneß (left) with Karl-Heinz Rummenigge in 2013

Immediately after retiring as a player in May 1979, Hoeneß was appointed commercial/general manager of Bayern Munich. On 27 November 2009, after 30 years as general manager, Hoeneß was elected president of the club. During his tenure, the club experienced strong growth in revenue and stature. Between 2002 and 2005, Bayern also built a state-of-the-art stadium, the Allianz Arena, at a cost of €340 million. Hoeneß was one of the catalysts for the building of the stadium.

In August 2016, Hoeneß announced that he would seek re-election to the post of president of Bayern Munich. He was re-elected in November 2016 with more than 97% of the votes, as there were no other candidates for the position.

On 1 May 2019, Hoeneß celebrated 40 years of working for Bayern's management. When he started on 1 May 1979, Bayern had twelve employees, 12 million Deutschmarks in revenue, and 8 million marks of debt. In November 2018, Bayern had over 1,000 employees and their revenue had risen to €657.4 million.

On 15 November 2019, Hoeneß retired as Bayern's president and was succeeded by Herbert Hainer. Hoeneß spent 49 years at Bayern, both as a player and in management of the club.

== Personal life ==
Hoeneß and his wife Susanne have two children, Sabine and Florian, and have been married for over 40 years. Hoeneß is the son of a master butcher and now co-owns HoWe Wurstwaren KG, a Nuremberg-based bratwurst factory. Hoeneß's younger brother Dieter also had a very successful career as a player in the Bundesliga and for the West Germany national team. Hoeneß's nephew Sebastian is a head coach for Bundesliga club VfB Stuttgart.

On 17 February 1982, Hoeneß was the sole survivor of the crash of a light aircraft in which three others died. He was on his way to a West Germany national team friendly. Sleeping in the rear of the plane, he sustained only minor injuries.

Hoeneß has provided financial assistance, either personally or through organizing benefit games, to other German league teams such as FC St. Pauli, Hertha BSC, Borussia Dortmund, 1860 München and Hansa Rostock.

Hoeneß has helped former Bayern players such as Sebastian Deisler (depression), Breno (depression), and Gerd Müller (alcoholism) in times of need.

=== Tax evasion and imprisonment ===
In April 2013, it was reported that Hoeneß was being investigated for tax evasion. He was reported to have held a Swiss bank account for the purpose of evading taxes due on investment income and to owe between €3.2 million and €7 million in taxes to the German state. The reports came after journalists "gained access to a document meant only for internal use by tax officials." Prosecutors from Munich carried out raids in offices of two Bavarian tax offices after Hoeneß filed a complaint. Despite increasing public criticism, Hoeneß remained in his position as president and chairman of the supervisory board of Bayern Munich.

Hoeneß was accused of tax evasion, and his trial began on 10 March 2014. The Bayern München AG supervisory board had a "unanimous opinion" that Hoeneß should continue in his role despite being sent to trial. During the trial, he admitted to evading 28.5 million euros in taxes. He was subsequently found guilty of seven serious counts of tax evasion and sentenced to three and a half years in prison on 13 March 2014. The following day, he resigned from his roles as President of Bayern Munich e.V. and chairman of the board of Bayern Munich AG and announced that he would not be appealing his sentence.

Hoeneß was to serve his sentence at Landsberg Prison. Hoeneß submitted a request to be confined to a different prison, however, he reported to Landsberg on 2 June 2014. During the first two weeks of his sentence, Hoeneß was housed in a larger cell with a cellmate "for medical reasons" and to help adjust to life behind bars. After the initial two weeks, he was moved into a single cell. On 2 January 2015, Hoeneß was granted day release. He had to return to prison at 6 p.m. every night.

There was an alleged attempt to extort €200,000 from Hoeneß under the threat of violence to him and his family. A man was arrested in connection with the scheme. His imprisonment ended on 29 February 2016.

== Career statistics ==
Club	Season	League			Cup		Continental		Other		Total		Ref.
Club	Season	League	Apps	Goals	Apps	Goals	Apps	Goals	Apps	Goals	Apps	Goals	Ref.
Bayern Munich	1969–70	Bundesliga	0	0	1	0	0	0	—		1	0	
Bayern Munich	1970–71	Bundesliga	31	6	6	0	7	1	—		44	7	
Bayern Munich	1971–72	Bundesliga	34	13	5	3	8	1	—		47	17	
Bayern Munich	1972–73	Bundesliga	34	17	6	3	6	2	—		46	22	
Bayern Munich	1973–74	Bundesliga	34	18	4	2	10	6	—		48	26	
Bayern Munich	1974–75	Bundesliga	28	8	3	1	7	3	—		38	12	
Bayern Munich	1975–76	Bundesliga	17	4	5	1	5	1	—		27	6	
Bayern Munich	1976–77	Bundesliga	27	9	4	4	8	0	2	0	41	13	
Bayern Munich	1977–78	Bundesliga	30	11	2	0	6	1	—		38	12	
Bayern Munich	1978–79	Bundesliga	4	0	2	0	—		—		6	0	
Bayern Munich	Totals		239	86	38	14	57	15	2	0	336	115	—
1. FC Nürnberg (loan)	1978–79	Bundesliga	11	0	1	0	—				12	0	
Career totals			250	86	39	14	57	15	2	0	348	115	—

== Honours ==
Bayern Munich

- Bundesliga: 1971–72, 1972–73, 1973–74
- DFB-Pokal: 1970–71
- European Cup: 1973–74, 1974–75, 1975–76
- Intercontinental Cup: 1976

West Germany

- FIFA World Cup: 1974
- UEFA European Championship: 1972; runner-up: 1976

Individual

- UEFA European Championship Team of the Tournament: 1972
- kicker Bundesliga Team of the Season: 1973–74

== Political positions and activism ==
In his country, Hoeneß publicly opposed the right-wing populist and extremist political party AfD in 2024, emphasizing his rejection of political movements that could tend towards National Socialism. In an interview with the 'FAZ,' he expressed concern about the popularity of the AfD and strongly emphasized that a return to such ideological tendencies as during the Nazi era should never be tolerated. Hoeneß underscored the importance of political activism, even in areas like sports, and called for action against extremist tendencies. He mentioned that he regularly watches n-tv and is particularly moved by documentaries about the Nazi era, including the concentration and extermination camps. These experiences evidently shape his political stance and his commitment to democratic values.

== Literature ==
- Juan Moreno: Uli Hoeneß: Ein Mann sieht Rot. Piper Verlag, München 2014, ISBN 978-3-492-05660-1.
- Patrick Strasser: Hier ist Hoeneß! Riva, München 2010, ISBN 978-3-86883-048-4.
- Peter Bizer: Uli Hoeneß. Nachspiel. Mensch, Macher, Mythos. Ellert & Richter Verlag, Hamburg 2014, ISBN 978-3-8319-0565-2.
- Christoph Bausenwein: Das Prinzip Uli Hoeneß. Ein Leben in Widersprüchen. Verlag Die Werkstatt, Göttingen 2014, ISBN 978-3-7307-0123-2.
- Petja Posor: Der Fall Hoeneß als Skandal in den Medien. Anschlusskommunikation, Authentisierung und Systemstabilisierung. Universitätsverlag Konstanz, Konstanz 2015, ISBN 978-3-86764-594-2.
