= Hans Jörg =

German footballer

Personal information
- Date of birth: 4 November 1950 (age 75)
- Position: Striker

Youth career
- –1973: FC Kempten

Senior career*
Years	Team	Apps	(Gls)
1972–1973	FC Bayern Munich	3	(0)
1973–1981	FC Augsburg	182	(52)
- * Club domestic league appearances and goals

Hans Jörg (born 4 November 1950) is a retired German football player. He spent one season in the Bundesliga with FC Bayern Munich.

== Honours ==
- Bundesliga champion: 1972–73
