= Willi Hoffmann =

German footballer (born 1948)

Personal information
- Date of birth: 23 March 1948 (age 78)
- Place of birth: Germany
- Position: Striker

Senior career*
Years	Team	Apps	(Gls)
–1971	SSV Ulm 1846		
1971–1974	FC Bayern Munich	55	(14)
1974–1977	FC Augsburg	92	(32)
- * Club domestic league appearances and goals

Willi Hoffmann (born 23 March 1948) is a retired German football player. He spent three seasons in the Bundesliga with FC Bayern Munich. After his time in Munich he spent several years with second division side Augsburg before returning to his hometown Göppingen.

== Honours ==
- European Cup winner: 1973–74
- Bundesliga champion: 1971–72, 1972–73, 1973–74
