= Reiner Hollmann =

German footballer (born 1949)

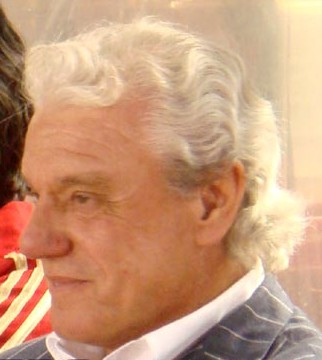

Personal information
- Date of birth: 30 September 1949 (age 77)
- Place of birth: Walsum, West Germany
- Height: 1.78 m (5 ft 10 in)
- Position: Defender

Senior career*
Years	Team	Apps	(Gls)
1970–1973	Rot-Weiß Oberhausen	91	(9)
1973–1984	Eintracht Braunschweig	305	(27)
Total		396	(36)

International career
1970–1972	West Germany Amateur	13	(1)
1975–1977	West Germany B	2	(0)

Managerial career
- 1984–1985: MTV Gifhorn
- 1988–1992: 1. FC Kaiserslautern (assistant)
- 1992–1993: Carl Zeiss Jena
- 1993–1994: Galatasaray
- 1994–1995: 1. FC Saarbrücken
- 1995–1997: Al Ahly
- 1997–1998: Carl Zeiss Jena
- 1998–1999: Al Hilal
- 1999–2000: Al-Nasr
- 2000–2001: Al-Kuwait
- 2001–2002: Al-Shaab
- 2002–2004: Al Shabab
- 2004–2006: Al Wahda
- 2006–2007: Al-Nasr
- 2007: Al-Wakrah
- 2008: Zamalek
- * Club domestic league appearances and goals

Reiner Hollmann (born 30 September 1949) is a German former football player and now manager.

== Playing career ==
Before coming to Duisburg, Hollmann was in the youth section of Eintracht Duisburg. He played from 1970 to 1984 for Rot-Weiß Oberhausen and Eintracht Braunschweig in 350 games in the Bundesliga scoring 33 goals.

He took part in the 1972 Summer Olympics in Munich.

In 1977, Hollmann was playing for Bundesliga side Eintracht Braunschweig against 1. FC Kaiserslautern. When protesting against a penalty kick he thought it was not justified, the referee unintentionally knocked him unconscious, and Hollmann woke up in the ambulance.

== Coaching career ==
After his playing career, Hollmann worked as a football coach. His greatest success as a coach was winning the Turkish Super Cup and the Turkish League with Galatasaray for the 1993–94 season. Further coaching positions were, amongst other clubs, 1. FC Saarbrücken, FC Carl Zeiss Jena and Al Ahly (Cairo).

For several years he has been in the United Arab Emirates where he has worked with Al Nasr, Al Shabab (Dubai) and Al Wahda (Abu Dhabi).
