= 1972–73 Bundesliga =

10th season of the Bundesliga

Bundesliga
- Season: 1972–73
- Dates: 16 September 1972 – 9 June 1973
- Champions: Bayern Munich; 3rd Bundesliga title 4th German title
- Relegated: Eintracht Braunschweig; Rot-Weiß Oberhausen
- European Cup: FC Bayern Munich
- Cup Winners' Cup: Borussia Mönchengladbach
- UEFA Cup: 1. FC Köln; Fortuna Düsseldorf; Wuppertaler SV; VfB Stuttgart
- Goals: 1,031
- Average goals/game: 3.37
- Top goalscorer: Gerd Müller (36)
- Biggest home win: M'gladbach 6–0 Bochum (23 February 1973); Hamburg 6–0 Oberhausen (28 April 1973); FC Bayern 6–0 K'lautern (5 May 1973)
- Biggest away win: Oberhausen 0–5 FC Bayern (16 September 1972); Wuppertal 0–5 M'gladbach (5 May 1973)
- Highest scoring: FC Bayern 7–2 Hannover (9 goals) (11 November 1972)

The 1972–73 Bundesliga was the tenth season of the Bundesliga, West Germany's premier football league. It began on 16 September 1972 and ended on 9 June 1973. FC Bayern Munich were the defending champions.

== Competition modus ==
Every team played two games against each other team, one at home and one away. Teams received two points for a win and one point for a draw. If two or more teams were tied on points, places were determined by goal difference and, if still tied, by goals scored. The team with the most points were crowned champions while the two teams with the fewest points were relegated to their respective Regionalliga divisions.

== Team changes to 1971–72 ==
Borussia Dortmund were relegated to the Regionalliga after finishing in 17th place. They were accompanied by Arminia Bielefeld, who were demoted by the DFB for playing a key role in the 1971 match fixing scandal (although their playing record would have relegated them anyway). Both teams were replaced by Wuppertaler SV and Kickers Offenbach, who won their respective promotion play-off groups.

== Team overview ==
Location of teams in Bundesliga 1972–73

Club	Ground	Capacity
Hertha BSC Berlin	Olympiastadion	100,000
VfL Bochum	Ruhrstadion	40,000
Eintracht Braunschweig	Eintracht-Stadion	38,000
SV Werder Bremen	Weserstadion	32,000
MSV Duisburg	Wedaustadion	38,500
Fortuna Düsseldorf	Rheinstadion	59,600
Eintracht Frankfurt	Waldstadion	87,000
Hamburger SV	Volksparkstadion	80,000
Hannover 96	Niedersachsenstadion	86,000
1. FC Kaiserslautern	Stadion Betzenberg	42,000
1. FC Köln	Radrennbahn Müngersdorf	29,000
Borussia Mönchengladbach	Bökelbergstadion	34,500
FC Bayern Munich	Olympiastadion	70,000
FC Bayern Munich	Stadion an der Grünwalder Straße (Note: Bayern Munich played only the first match at this stadium.)	44,300
Rot-Weiß Oberhausen	Niederrheinstadion	30,000
Kickers Offenbach	Bieberer Berg	30,000
FC Schalke 04	Glückauf-Kampfbahn	35,000
VfB Stuttgart	Neckarstadion	53,000
Wuppertaler SV	Stadion am Zoo	28,000

== League table ==
Pos	Team	Pld	W	D	L	GF	GA	GD	Pts	Qualification or relegation
1	Bayern Munich (C)	34	25	4	5	93	29	+64	54	Qualification to European Cup first round
2	1. FC Köln	34	16	11	7	66	51	+15	43	Qualification to UEFA Cup first round
3	Fortuna Düsseldorf	34	15	12	7	62	45	+17	42	Qualification to UEFA Cup first round
4	Wuppertaler SV	34	15	10	9	62	49	+13	40	Qualification to UEFA Cup first round
5	Borussia Mönchengladbach	34	17	5	12	82	61	+21	39	Qualification to Cup Winners' Cup first round
6	VfB Stuttgart	34	17	3	14	71	65	+6	37	Qualification to UEFA Cup first round (Note: As Borussia Mönchengladbach qualified for the Cup Winners' Cup and DFB-Pokal runners-up 1. FC Köln had already qualified for the UEFA Cup via league placement, M'gladbach's spot was transferred to sixth-placed team VfB Stuttgart.)
7	Kickers Offenbach	34	14	7	13	61	60	+1	35	
8	Eintracht Frankfurt	34	15	4	15	58	54	+4	34	
9	1. FC Kaiserslautern	34	12	10	12	58	68	−10	34	
10	MSV Duisburg	34	12	9	13	53	54	−1	33	
11	Werder Bremen	34	12	7	15	50	52	−2	31	
12	VfL Bochum	34	11	9	14	50	68	−18	31	
13	Hertha BSC	34	11	8	15	53	64	−11	30	
14	Hamburger SV	34	10	8	16	53	59	−6	28	
15	Schalke 04	34	10	8	16	46	61	−15	28	
16	Hannover 96	34	9	8	17	49	65	−16	26	
17	Eintracht Braunschweig (R)	34	9	7	18	33	56	−23	25	Relegation to Regionalliga
18	Rot-Weiß Oberhausen (R)	34	9	4	21	45	84	−39	22	Relegation to Regionalliga

Source: www.dfb.de
Rules for classification: 1) points; 2) goal difference; 3) number of goals scored.
(C) Champions; (R) Relegated

== Results ==
Home \ Away	BSC	BOC	EBS	SVW	DUI	F95	SGE	HSV	H96	FCK	KOE	BMG	FCB	RWO	KOF	S04	VFB	WSV
Hertha BSC	—	2–0	3–0	2–1	0–0	2–3	3–1	2–1	2–1	4–1	1–1	3–1	2–5	3–1	2–5	3–0	5–1	0–1
VfL Bochum	2–1	—	2–2	2–0	2–1	2–2	2–1	3–3	2–0	3–0	2–4	3–0	0–2	2–2	2–3	2–0	3–1	2–2
Eintracht Braunschweig	2–1	0–2	—	1–0	1–1	1–2	2–1 (Note: The Eintracht Braunschweig v Eintracht Frankfurt match from 31 October 1972 was suspended after 45 minutes (half-time) and a score of 3–0 due to poor visibility caused by heavy fog. The replay took place on 28 November 1972 and finished with a score of 2–1.)	1–1	3–2	0–0	2–0	0–0	0–2	3–1	2–2	1–1	1–0	0–1
Werder Bremen	1–1	5–2	4–2	—	0–2	1–3	2–0	1–4	3–1	5–1	2–1	1–1	1–0	1–0	0–0	2–0	0–2	0–1
MSV Duisburg	2–1	0–1	3–2	1–2	—	0–0	2–1	3–0	3–1	3–4	1–1	2–2	2–0	4–1	4–0	0–1	0–1	0–0
Fortuna Düsseldorf	3–1	1–1	2–0	2–1	2–1	—	2–2	2–2	0–1	2–1	3–2	1–3	0–0	3–1	2–0	1–1	6–1	2–1
Eintracht Frankfurt	2–2	4–1	1–0	2–2	1–3	2–1	—	2–1	2–0	3–1	5–0	3–0	2–1	2–1	0–3	4–2	2–1	2–1
Hamburger SV	4–0	2–1	1–0	2–2	1–2	2–1	3–1	—	2–0	2–2	0–0	1–3	0–2	6–0	1–0	0–1	2–0	2–2
Hannover 96	2–0	1–1	2–1	2–2	3–3	2–2	2–1	3–2	—	2–3	0–0	1–2	1–3	3–2	1–1	1–0	3–1	1–1
1. FC Kaiserslautern	2–2	2–2	3–0	3–1	0–0	1–1	0–1	2–2	2–1	—	2–1	3–1	3–1	6–2	3–1	2–0	2–1	1–1
1. FC Köln	4–0	2–1	4–3	1–0	3–1	1–0	3–1	2–1	3–3	2–0	—	3–1	2–1	3–1	1–1	3–0	5–1	1–1
Borussia Mönchengladbach	2–2	6–0	4–0	3–1	4–3	2–3	0–2	6–1	3–1	6–2	5–2	—	0–3	4–1	3–2	4–1	3–4	2–1
Bayern Munich	4–0	5–1	3–0	2–1	2–0	3–2	3–1	1–0	7–2	6–0	1–1	3–0	—	5–3	3–1	5–0	5–1	4–1
Rot-Weiß Oberhausen	2–1	1–1	0–1	2–3	4–0	0–3	1–0	3–1	1–0	3–1	2–2	1–3	0–5	—	2–1	2–1	2–2	2–1
Kickers Offenbach	0–0	4–0	1–0	2–1	4–1	1–1	3–2	2–1	2–1	2–2	2–3	2–1	0–3	4–0	—	2–0	1–3	3–1
Schalke 04	1–1	2–0	0–1	1–2	1–1	3–1	3–2	2–0	3–1	2–2	2–2	2–2	1–1	3–0	6–1	—	2–0	1–2
VfB Stuttgart	4–0	4–0	4–0	2–1	3–4	2–2	2–2	2–1	2–0	3–1	3–1	3–0	0–1	3–0	4–2	6–2	—	4–2
Wuppertaler SV	4–1	3–0	2–1	1–1	5–0	1–1	1–0	5–1	0–4	2–0	2–2	0–5	1–1	3–1	4–3	4–1	4–0	—

Source: DFB
Legend: Blue = home team win; Yellow = draw; Red = away team win.

== Top goalscorers ==
36 goals

- (Germany) Gerd Müller (FC Bayern Munich)

28 goals

- (Germany) Jupp Heynckes (Borussia Mönchengladbach)

21 goals

- (Germany) Günter Pröpper (Wuppertaler SV)

19 goals

- (Germany) Erwin Kostedde (Kickers Offenbach)

18 goals

- (Germany) Hans Walitza (VfL Bochum)

17 goals

- (Germany) Uli Hoeneß (FC Bayern Munich)
- (Germany) Klaus Wunder (MSV Duisburg)

16 goals

- (Germany) Reiner Geye (Fortuna Düsseldorf)

14 goals

- (Germany) Klaus Budde (Fortuna Düsseldorf)
- (Germany) Willi Reimann (Hannover 96)

== Champion squad ==
FC Bayern Munich
Goalkeeper: Sepp Maier (34).

Defenders: Franz Beckenbauer (34 / 6); Johnny Hansen (Denmark) (34 / 1); Hans-Georg Schwarzenbeck (34 / 1); Paul Breitner (32 / 4); Gernot Rohr (3); Günther Rybarczyk (2).
Midfielders: Uli Hoeneß (34 / 17); Franz Roth (32 / 5); Franz Krauthausen (29 / 4); Rainer Zobel (28 / 2).
Forwards: Gerd Müller (33 / 36); Bernd Dürnberger (31 / 3); Wilhelm Hoffmann (24 / 9); Edgar Schneider (16 / 3); Hans Jörg (3); Herbert Zimmermann (1).
(league appearances and goals listed in brackets)

Manager: Udo Lattek.

On the roster but have not played in a league game: Manfred Seifert; Zlatko Škorić (Socialist Federal Republic of Yugoslavia) ; Matthias Obermeier; Georg Weiß; Wolfgang Sühnholz; Martin Wildgruber.

== See also ==
- 1972–73 DFB-Pokal
