= Johnny Hansen (footballer, born 1943) =

Danish footballer

Personal information
- Full name: Johnny Terney Hansen
- Date of birth: 14 November 1943 (age 82)
- Place of birth: Vejle, Denmark
- Height: 1.80 m (5 ft 11 in)
- Position: Right back

Senior career*
Years	Team	Apps	(Gls)
1962–1968	Vejle Boldklub	150	(1)
1968–1970	1. FC Nürnberg	55	(5)
1970–1976	FC Bayern Munich	164	(7)
1976–1978	Vejle Boldklub	64	(3)
Total		433	(16)

International career
1965–1978	Denmark	45	(3)
- * Club domestic league appearances and goals

Johnny Terney Hansen (born 14 November 1943) is a Danish former professional footballer who played as a defender. He most notably played six years as a professional for German club Bayern Munich, with whom he won multiple domestic and international titles. He played 45 matches and scored three goals for the Denmark national football team between 1965 and 1978, and won the 1967 Danish Player of the Year award.

== Biography ==
Johnny Terney Hansen was born in Vejle, and started his career in local top-flight club Vejle Boldklub. He debuted for the Danish national team in September 1965, and instantly commanded a place in the national team starting line-up. Having been named Danish Player of the Year in 1967, he moved abroad to play professionally in 1968. He signed with 1. FC Nürnberg in the top-flight German Bundesliga. As the Danish national team was restricted to amateur players, Hansen was dropped from the national team.

After two years in Nuremberg, the club had been relegated, and Hansen moved on to Bundesliga club Bayern Munich in 1970. At Bayern, he became a regular starter in the right fullback position. His time at Bayern Munich was very successful. In Hansen's first year at the club, they won the 1971 DFB-Pokal cup trophy, and finished second in the Bundesliga. As the Danish rule of amateurism was abolished in 1971, Hansen returned to the national team.

Hansen was the first player to score in a Bundesliga match at the Olympic Stadium in Munich in June 1972 when Bayern secured the Championship with a 5–1 win over runner up against Schalke 04. The game was the last round of the 1972 Bundesliga, when Bayern and FC Schalke 04 decided the championship between them, in front of 79.012 spectators. Bayern won 5–1. In the following years, Bayern swept the Bundesliga, winning the 1972, 1973 and 1974 championships. For three consecutive seasons (1974 to 1976), the club also won the international European Cup tournament each year. Hansen followed the 1975 final from his sickbed, but played in the 1974 and 1976 finals. In 1976, Hansen also helped Bayern Munich win the Intercontinental Cup.

After eight seasons in Germany, Hansen returned to Vejle Boldklub in 1976. He won the 1977 Danish Cup and 1978 Danish championship with Vejle, before retiring at the end of the 1978 season. He played a total 214 games for Vejle.

== Honours ==
=== Club ===
Bayern

- DFB-Pokal: 1970–71
- Bundesliga: 1971–72, 1972–73, 1973–74
- European Cup: 1973–74, 1974–75, 1975–76
- Intercontinental Cup: 1976
- Danish Cup: 1976–77
- Danish championship: 1978

=== Individual ===
- Danish Player of the Year: 1967
