= Rainer Zobel =

German footballer and manager

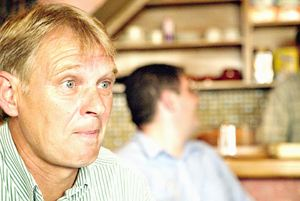

Personal information
- Date of birth: 3 November 1948 (age 77)
- Place of birth: Wrestedt, Germany
- Height: 1.76 m (5 ft 9 in)
- Position: Midfielder

Senior career*
Years	Team	Apps	(Gls)
1968–1970	Hannover 96	66	(4)
1970–1976	Bayern Munich	180	(19)
1976–1977	Lüneburger SK		

International career
1972	West Germany B	1	(0)

Managerial career
- 1987–1990: Eintracht Braunschweig (assistant)
- 1990–1992: Stuttgarter Kickers
- 1992–1993: 1. FC Kaiserslautern
- 1994: 1. FC Nürnberg
- 1996–1997: Tennis Borussia Berlin
- 1998–2000: Al Ahly
- 2000–2001: Stuttgarter Kickers
- 2002: Bani Yas
- 2002–2003: El-Ittihad El-Iskandary
- 2004–2005: Persepolis
- 2006: Sharjah
- 2006–2007: ENPPI
- 2008: FC Dinamo Tbilisi
- 2009–2010: Moroka Swallows
- 2013: FC Milsami
- 2013–2015: El Gouna
- 2016–2017: Wenden 1920
- 2018–: Lüneburger SK Hansa
- * Club domestic league appearances and goals

Rainer Zobel (born 3 November 1948) is a German football manager and former player.

== Playing career ==
Zobel was born in Wrestedt. He played for FC Bayern Munich during the 1970s.

== Coaching career ==
In 2005, Zobel was head coach of Persepolis F.C. in Iran's Premier Football League. He was named as coach of Moroka Swallows, a South African team from Johannesburg and signed on 17 July 2009 a one-year contract.

== Honours as a player ==
Bayern Munich

- Bundesliga: 1972–73, 1973–74
- DFB-Pokal: 1970–71
- European Cup: 1973–74, 1974–75, 1975–76
- Intercontinental Cup: 1976
