= Reiner Geye =

German footballer

Personal information
- Date of birth: 22 November 1949
- Place of birth: Duisburg, West Germany
- Date of death: 8 August 2002 (aged 52)
- Place of death: Mainz, Germany
- Height: 1.85 m (6 ft 1 in)
- Position: Striker

Senior career*
| Years | Team | Apps | (Gls) |
| 1970–1977 | Fortuna Düsseldorf | 195 | (66) |
| 1977–1986 | 1. FC Kaiserslautern | 290 | (47) |
| Total | | 485 | (113) |

International career
| 1972–1974 | West Germany | 4 | (1) |
- * Club domestic league appearances and goals

Reiner Geye (born 22 November 1949 in Duisburg; died 8 August 2002 in Mainz) was a German football player.

His career started with TuS Duisburg 48/99 and Eintracht Duisburg. From 1968 he played for Fortuna Düsseldorf. Between 1971 and 1986 he played in the German Bundesliga for Fortuna Düsseldorf and 1. FC Kaiserslautern in 485 matches, in which he scored 113 goals.

He also won four caps for West Germany (one goal) in the 1970s.

In later years, he served as honorary vice chairman and manager (until 1996) of 1. FC Kaiserslautern.

Geye died of liver disease at age 52.

== Honours ==
- DFB-Pokal finalist: 1980–81
