= New National Stadium =

New National Stadium may refer to:

- New Laos National Stadium
- New National Stadium (Asunción)
- New National Stadium (Tokyo)
