= 1987 Rous Cup =

Tournament details
- Dates: 19–26 May
- Teams: 3 (from 2 confederations)
- Venue: 2 (in 2 host cities)

Final positions
- Champions: Brazil
- Runners-up: England
- Third place: Scotland

Tournament statistics
- Matches played: 3
- Goals scored: 4 (1.33 per match)
- Attendance: 198,097 (66,032 per match)

The 1987 Rous Cup was the third staging of the Rous Cup annual international football match that increased the teams from the two rivals of England and Scotland to increase the competition experience for FA to invite Brazil.

Brazil successfully pursued the 1987 cup by defeating Scotland in the final game to take the trophy. This was the last game that the Hampden Park square goalposts were used.

== Results ==
All times listed are British Summer Time (UTC+1)

=== England vs Brazil ===
19 May 1987
20:00

England	1–1	Brazil
Lineker 35'	Report	Mirandinha 36'

Wembley Stadium, London
Attendance: 92,000
Referee: Michel Vautrot (France)

England
Brazil

GK	1	Peter Shilton (Southampton)
DF	2	Gary Stevens (Everton)
DF	5	Tony Adams (Arsenal)
DF	6	Terry Butcher (Rangers)
DF	3	Stuart Pearce (Nottingham Forest)
MF	4	Peter Reid (Everton)
MF	7	Bryan Robson (Manchester United) (c)
MF	8	Chris Waddle (Tottenham Hotspur)
FW	10	Gary Lineker (Barcelona)	(substituted off) 76'
FW	9	Peter Beardsley (Newcastle United)
MF	11	John Barnes (Watford)
Substitutions:
FW		Mark Hateley (Milan)	(substituted on) 76'
Manager:
Bobby Robson

GK	1	Carlos (Corinthians)
DF	2	Josimar (Botafogo)	(yellow card) 47'
DF	3	Geraldão (Porto) (c)
MF	5	Ricardo Rocha (Guarani)
MF	6	Douglas (Cruzeiro)
DF	4	Nelsinho (São Paulo)
FW	9	Müller (São Paulo)
MF	10	Silas (São Paulo)		(substituted off) 82'
FW	11	Mirandinha (Palmeiras)
MF	7	Edu Marangon (Portuguesa)		(substituted off) 82'
MF	8	Valdo (Grêmio)
Substitutions:
MF	15	Dunga (Santos)		(substituted on) 82'
MF	17	Raí (São Paulo)		(substituted on) 82'
Manager:
Carlos Alberto Silva

=== Scotland vs England ===
23 May 1987
15:00

Scotland	0–0	England
	Report

Hampden Park, Glasgow
Attendance: 64,713
Referee: Dieter Pauly (West Germany)

GK	1	Jim Leighton (Aberdeen)
DF	2	Richard Gough (Tottenham Hotspur)
DF	3	Murdo MacLeod (Celtic)
MF	4	Paul McStay (Celtic)
DF	5	Alex McLeish (Aberdeen)
DF	6	Willie Miller (Aberdeen)
FW	7	Ally McCoist (Rangers)
MF	8	Roy Aitken (Celtic) (c)
FW	9	Brian McClair (Celtic)	(substituted off) 58'
MF	10	Neil Simpson (Aberdeen)
MF	11	Ian Wilson (Leicester City)
Substitutions:
FW		Charlie Nicholas (Arsenal)	(substituted on) 58'
Manager:
Andy Roxburgh

GK	1	Chris Woods (Rangers)
DF	2	Gary Stevens (Everton)
DF	3	Stuart Pearce (Nottingham Forest)
MF	4	Glenn Hoddle (Tottenham Hotspur)
DF	5	Mark Wright (Southampton)
DF	6	Terry Butcher (Rangers)
MF	7	Bryan Robson (Manchester United) (c)
MF	8	Steve Hodge (Tottenham Hotspur)
FW	9	Mark Hateley (Milan)
FW	10	Peter Beardsley (Newcastle United)
MF	11	Chris Waddle (Tottenham Hotspur)
Manager:
Bobby Robson

=== Scotland vs Brazil ===
26 May 1987
20:00

Scotland	0–2	Brazil
	Report	Raí 51'; Valdo 60'

Hampden Park, Glasgow
Attendance: 41,384
Referee: Luigi Agnolin (Italy)

Scotland
Brazil

GK	1	Andy Goram (Oldham Athletic)
DF	2	Richard Gough (Tottenham Hotspur)
DF	3	Murdo MacLeod (Celtic)
MF	4	Roy Aitken (Celtic) (c)
DF	5	Alex McLeish (Aberdeen)
DF	6	Willie Miller (Aberdeen)
MF	7	Paul McStay (Celtic)
MF	8	Jim McInally (Dundee United)	(substituted off) 58'
FW	9	Ally McCoist (Rangers)
MF	10	Ian Wilson (Leicester City)
FW	11	Davie Cooper (Rangers)
Substitutions:
FW		Brian McClair (Celtic)	(substituted on) 58'
Manager:
Andy Roxburgh

GK	1	Carlos (Corinthians)
DF	2	Josimar (Botafogo)
DF	3	Geraldão (Porto) (c)
MF	4	Ricardo Rocha (Guarani)
MF	5	Douglas (Cruzeiro)
DF	6	Nelsinho (São Paulo)
FW	7	Müller (São Paulo)
MF	8	Raí (São Paulo)
FW	9	Mirandinha (Palmeiras)
MF	10	Edu Marangon (Portuguesa)
MF	11	Valdo (Grêmio)
Manager:
Carlos Alberto Silva

== Final standings ==
Team	Pld	W	D	L	GF	GA	GD	Pts
Brazil	2	1	1	0	3	1	+2	3
England	2	0	2	0	1	1	0	2
Scotland	2	0	1	1	0	2	–2	1

1987 Rous Cup
tournament winners

Brazil

== Goalscorers ==
1 goal

- (Brazil) Mirandinha
- (Brazil) Raí
- (Brazil) Valdo
- (England) Gary Lineker
