= Estadio Nacional del Paraguay =

Stadium in Asunción, Paraguay

Estadio National del Paraguay
- Location: Asunción, Paraguay
- Owner: Asunción
- Operator: Asunción
- Capacity: 47,128

Construction
- Groundbreaking: 2026 (planned)
- Opened: 2028 (planned)

Tenant
- Paraguay national football team (planned)

The Estadio National del Paraguay, also known as the New National Stadium, is a multi-purpose stadium in Asunción, Paraguay. It will be a venue for Paraguay's group stage match during the 2030 FIFA World Cup and it is planned to hold around 47,128 spectators.

== History ==
The design of the stadium was first mentioned in 2023 after the 2030 FIFA World Cup bid was accepted, when a preliminary concept of the stadium was unveiled.

In July 2024, it was announced that construction is planned to begin in 2026, and the stadium is scheduled to open in 2028.

== See also ==
- List of football stadiums in Paraguay
