= Hampden Park square goalposts =

Pair of goalposts in Scotland for football matches

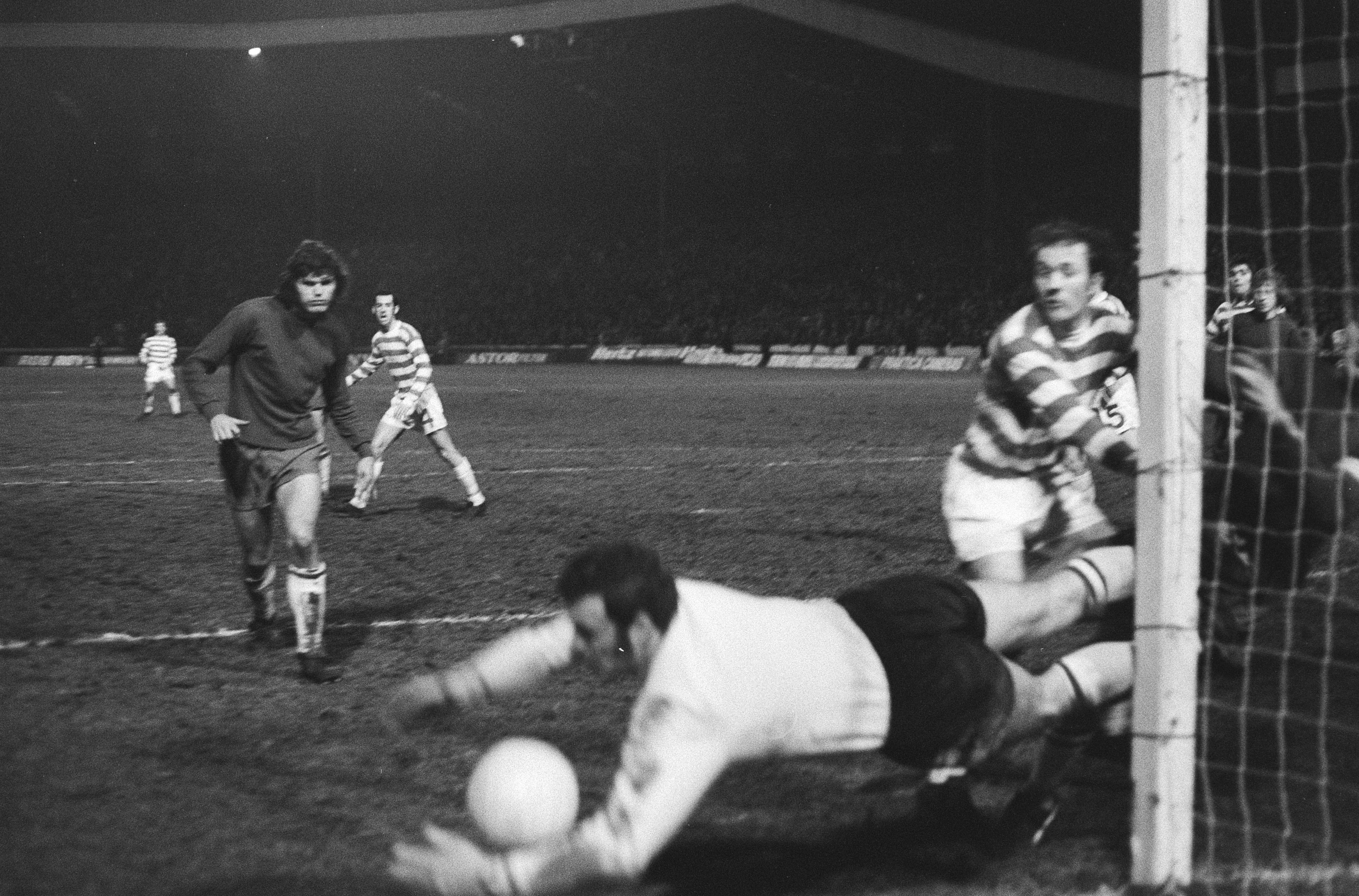
One of the square goalposts seen at the 1971 European Cup match between Celtic and Ajax played at Hampden Park

The Hampden Park square goalposts were a pair of goalposts used at Hampden Park in Glasgow, Scotland, for football matches. The goalposts were noted as being wooden and square shaped rather than the usual metal and rounded shape of football goalposts. They were used from 1903 until 1987 when FIFA banned their use. They now reside in the museum of AS Saint-Étienne at Stade Geoffroy-Guichard in Saint-Étienne, France.

== History ==
Hampden Park was opened in 1903 as the home of Queen's Park and the Scotland national football team. They installed square goalposts which were standard at the time. From 1964, stadiums started installing round goalposts but Hampden retained its square ones. The original goalposts installed in 1903 remained at Scotland's national stadium until the ban on their use.

The square goalposts caused controversy at the 1976 European Cup Final between France's Saint-Étienne and West Germany's Bayern Munich. During the first half of the match, Saint-Étienne's Dominique Bathenay shot against the face of the crossbar, and a header by Jacques Santini hit the edge of the goalpost and went back into play. Saint-Étienne alleged that had the posts been round, in at least one of the two incidents the ball would have bounced into the goal, but instead they lost the match 1–0. They gained the nickname in France of "Les Poteaux Carrés" (English: The Square Posts), which was referred to as the "French excuse". A number of Saint-Étienne fan groups and cafes around the club named themselves after the Hampden goalposts.

== Ban ==
In 1987, FIFA banned any non-rounded goalposts from being used on the grounds that cylindrical shaped posts encouraged more goals. Queen's Park were unable to alter the square posts to the new requirements as it would have compromised the wooden posts' structural integrity. Accordingly, Hampden's square goalposts were removed and the last game they were used in was the 1987 Rous Cup match between Scotland and Brazil. They went up for auction and were sold to a consortium for £6,200. The consortium bought the goalposts to prevent them being sold to people who wished to break them up. The goalposts were stored on the roof of The Farmer's Boy pub in Kidderminster, Worcestershire, England, until 1993. In 1995, it was announced they would be returned to Scotland to be part of the new Scottish national football museum following Hampden Park's redevelopment. Whilst the museum was being built, they were housed at the Glasgow Transport Museum.

In 2013, Saint-Étienne contacted the Scottish Football Association with a request to buy them. The goalposts were purchased by Saint-Étienne for €20,000 to be displayed at their new museum after restoration. In 2016, the curator of the museum put in a request to UEFA for the posts to be used in the UEFA Euro 2016 Final.
