= 2030 FIFA World Cup bids =

Football World Cup host nation bids

The 2030 FIFA World Cup bidding process resulted in the Fédération Internationale de Football Association (FIFA) selecting the joint bid as the location for the 2030 FIFA World Cup: Morocco, Portugal, and Spain as the host nations. Additionally, Argentina, Paraguay, and Uruguay will serve as nations that open the event, as a commemoration of the 100th anniversary of the first World Cup.

== Host selection ==
FIFA launched the bidding process in 2022. As hosts of the 2022 and 2026 editions respectively, the 2030 FIFA World Cup could not be hosted by a member of the Asian AFC or the North American CONCACAF.

Hosts are required to have at least fourteen all-seater stadiums with a capacity of 40,000, with a minimum of seven being pre-existing. The opening match and final must take place in an 80,000-seat stadium, while the semi-finals must take place in a 60,000-seat stadium. Hosts must also have at least 72 suitable training site options for team base camps, four suitable venue-specific training site options per stadium, in addition to two suitable referee base camp training site options, all with suitable accommodation. The FIFA Council also regulates requirements relating to broadcasting sites, competition-related event sites, as well as accommodation. In addition, FIFA has stated that sustainability, environmental protections and human rights are also factors considered by the council, along with governmental support, the organisational model to be used, besides provisions for the establishment of a "legacy fund".

== Bids ==
=== Spain–Portugal–Morocco ===
After two years of discussions between the Royal Spanish Football Federation and the Portuguese Football Federation, the two federations announced in October 2020 their plans to submit a joint bid. The agreement was ratified by the presidents of both federations the following June, and gained support from the heads of state and government of both countries. The Ukrainian Association of Football joined in October 2022 as a potential host for group stage matches during the tournament, despite the ongoing Russian invasion of Ukraine. Backed by the CAF, the Royal Moroccan Football Federation, who independently announced their intention to bid, also joined Spain and Portugal's bid in March 2023.

Spain hosted the 1982 World Cup, Euro 1964, and co-hosted Euro 2020, Portugal hosted Euro 2004, Ukraine co-hosted Euro 2012, while Morocco has hosted AFCON 1988 and WAFCON 2022. Fifteen potential venues across thirteen cities in peninsular Spain and the Canary Islands were shortlisted with the intention of downselecting to eleven venues for the tournament; the Santiago Bernabéu Stadium in Madrid could host the tournament's opening match and final. Six venues in Morocco were selected for the bid, including five existing venues and a new 93,000-seat stadium. Fouzi Lekjaa, president of the Royal Moroccan Football Federation stated his intention for the final to be played in Casablanca. He added that the three federations of Morocco, Spain and Portugal would convene on 18 October to discuss the scheduling of World Cup matches. After the meeting, the three federations agreed to present their letter of intent to host the 2030 FIFA World Cup on 28 October, following the formal procedure of the bidding process. Lekjaa stated that the three countries would also host the FIFA Club World Cup in 2029, which would confirm their readiness one year before the main event.

=== Uruguay–Argentina–Chile–Paraguay ===
The Argentine and Uruguayan Football Association announced in July 2017 their joint bid, following years of planning, celebrating the centennial of the first World Cup hosted by Uruguay in 1930, and the bicentennial of the country's first constitution. National team players Luis Suárez of Uruguay and Lionel Messi of Argentina presented commemorative shirts promoting the bid at a highly publicised press conference that September. The Paraguayan Football Federation subsequently joined the bid that October, while the Football Federation of Chile joined in February 2019. Argentina, Chile, Paraguay, and Uruguay have all hosted the Copa América. Argentina, Chile, and Uruguay have hosted the FIFA World Cup, while Argentina and Chile have hosted Copa América Femenina. Eighteen stadiums across thirteen host cities are being considered as venues for the tournament: sixteen existing venues and a new stadium in Luque, Paraguay, where the headquarters of CONMEBOL are located.

=== Evaluation report ===
On 30 November 2024, 13 days before the vote, the evaluation report was released. The Morocco–Portugal–Spain bid scored higher than the Argentina–Paraguay–Uruguay bid.

==== Evaluation score ====
2030 FIFA World Cup evaluation report
Bidding nation(s)	Evaluation score
Morocco, Portugal and Spain	4.2/5
Argentina, Paraguay and Uruguay	3.6/5

==== Voting ====
The vote to ratify Spain, Portugal, and Morocco as main hosts of the 2030 FIFA World Cup alongside Argentina, Paraguay, and Uruguay took place during the Q4 2024 FIFA Congress meeting on 11 December.

2024 Extraordinary FIFA Congress 11 December 2024 – Zürich, Switzerland (Note: The FIFA extraordinary congress was held online.)
Nation	Round 1
Morocco, Spain, Portugal	Acclamation

== Abandoned bids ==
=== Egypt–Greece–Saudi Arabia ===
Currently, an AFC member cannot host the 2030 edition, as Qatar hosted the 2022 edition. However, FIFA President Gianni Infantino alluded to potential rule changes allowing Asian countries to bid. Saudi Arabia planned a cross-confederation bid with UEFA member Greece and CAF member Egypt, after considering a bid with Italy or Morocco. In recent years, the three nations have developed strong political, economic, and military ties.

Greece originally bid with Bulgaria, Romania and Serbia for Euro 2028 and the 2030 World Cup. Despite the approval of the countries' governments, culminating in the bid's announcement in February 2019, a memorandum of understanding being signed in April, and an official announcement a few weeks before the start of the 2022 FIFA World Cup in Qatar, the bid was abandoned in 2022 when Greece joined Saudi Arabia instead. Saudi Arabia sought to further develop its diplomatic and military relations with Greece, and offered to fund the construction of new stadiums in Greece for the tournament. The proposal attracted controversy for accusations of sportswashing Saudi Arabia's poor human rights record, and the country's unfavourable summer climate. Egypt's sports minister Ashraf Sobhy and Egyptian Football Association President Hany Abo Rida both expressed interest in hosting, but in April 2023, Sobhy revealed that Egypt was not planning a bid. By June, planning for the bid ceased. On 1 September 2023 media reported Saudi Arabia to switch its FIFA World Cup focus from a 2030 joint bid to a 2034 sole bid.

=== United Kingdom–Ireland ===
As early as 2015, the English Football Association (FA) expressed interest in bidding. UEFA endorsed a possible English or pan-British bid, as President Aleksander Čeferin saw a British bid as the "wisest" option to consolidate efforts to realise a European-hosted World Cup into. The FA ultimately embarked on pan-British bid in 2018, joining with the football associations of Scotland, who sought an opportunity to redevelop Hampden Park, Wales and Northern Ireland. The Republic of Ireland's football association also joined in late 2018. The proposal enjoyed broad political support from the British Parliament, who later reserved £2.8 million for a potential bid, and the governments of the Republic of Ireland, Scotland, Wales and Northern Ireland. However, in January 2022, the five football associations announced that they would instead bid to host Euro 2028, leading to the abandonment of the World Cup bid shortly after.

=== Other bids ===
Cameroonian politician Joshua Osih made a potential joint bid with neighbouring central African nations part of his failed 2018 presidential election campaign, which attracted interest from Angola, the Central African Republic, the Republic of the Congo, the Democratic Republic of the Congo, Gabon and Nigeria. South Korean President Moon Jae-in expressed hope that a World Cup jointly hosted by North and South Korea would help improve relations in the region; the Korea Football Association would later extend a co-hosting offer to China and Japan, with Moon's approval. In addition, the Presidents of Colombia, Ecuador and Peru publicly announced their intentions to submit a joint bid, Football Australia explored a bid with Sydney 2000 bid chief Rod McGeoch, and the UNAF endorsed any potential joint North African bid. None of these efforts resulted in bids.
