= Hampden Park =

Association football stadium in Glasgow, Scotland

- Scottish Gaelic: Pàirc Hampden
- Scotland's National Stadium
- Official logo of Hampden Park

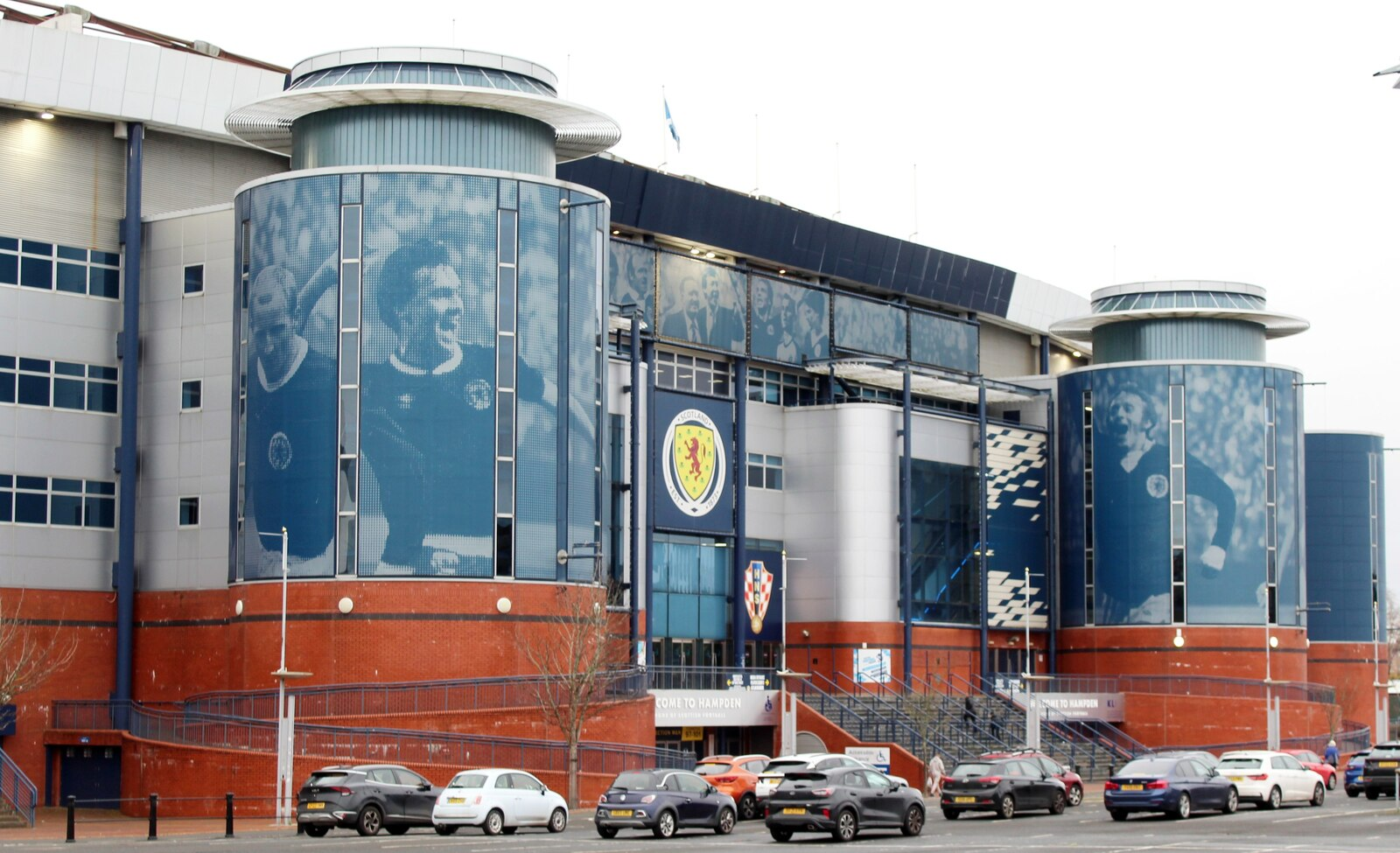
- Exterior view of Hampden Park, November 2024; UEFA

- Location in Glasgow
- Full name: Barclays Hampden
- Location: Mount Florida, Glasgow, Scotland
- Coordinates: 55°49′33″N 4°15′7″W
- Owner: Scottish Football Association
- Capacity: 51,866 (football); 44,000 (athletics)
- Surface: Natural grass surface
- Record attendance: 149,547 (Scotland v. England, 17 April 1937)
- Field size: 115 yd × 75 yd (105 m × 69 m)
- Public transit: Mount Florida; King's Park; Buchanan

Construction
- Opened: 31 October 1903; 123 years ago
- Renovated: 1999; 27 years ago
- Architect: Jim Clydesdale (1999)

Tenants
- Queen's Park F.C. (1903–2021; 2023–2025); Scotland national team (1906–present); Glasgow Tigers (1969–1972); Celtic F.C. (1994–1995); Scottish Claymores (1998–2004); Rangers F.C. (2024)

Website
- www.hampdenpark.co.uk

Hampden Park (/ˈhɑːmdən/ HAHM-dən; Scottish Gaelic: Pàirc Hampden), currently known as Barclays Hampden for sponsorship reasons, is a football stadium in the Mount Florida area of Glasgow, Scotland. It is the national stadium of football in Scotland and home of the Scotland national football team. Hampden Park is owned by the Scottish Football Association (SFA), and regularly hosts the semi-finals and finals of the Scottish Cup and Scottish League Cup. The largest stadium in the world by capacity from its opening 1903 until 1950, Hampden Park is the 11th-largest football stadium in the United Kingdom, and the second-largest football stadium in Scotland. The stadium retains all attendance records recorded in European football.

A UEFA category four stadium, Hampden Park has hosted six European finals including the 1960 European Cup final between Real Madrid and Eintracht Frankfurt which, with a crowd of 127,621 in attendance, is the highest ever recorded attendance for a European Cup final. The stadium houses the offices of the Scottish Football Association (SFA) and Scottish Professional Football League (SPFL) and has hosted three European Cup/Champions League finals, two Cup Winners' Cup finals and a UEFA Cup final. It has hosted other sporting events including the 2012 Olympic Games and the 2014 Commonwealth Games (also hosting the 2014 Commonwealth Games closing ceremony). Scotland was one of the eleven host countries of the Euro 2020 tournament with the stadium hosting the round of 16 matches and will host matches of Euro 2028, of which Scotland is again one of the host countries.

A stadium on the present site opened on 31 October 1903, with a capacity in excess of 100,000. This was increased between 1927 and 1937, reaching a peak of 150,000. The record attendance of 149,415, for Scotland v England in 1937, is the European record for an international football match. Tighter safety regulations meant that the capacity was reduced to 81,000 in 1977. The stadium has been fully renovated since then, with the most recent significant work being completed in 1999. Ahead of the 2014 Commonwealth Games, Hampden Park underwent modifications to the stadium to include a running track and other features required for hosting the games.

== History ==
=== Three Hampdens ===
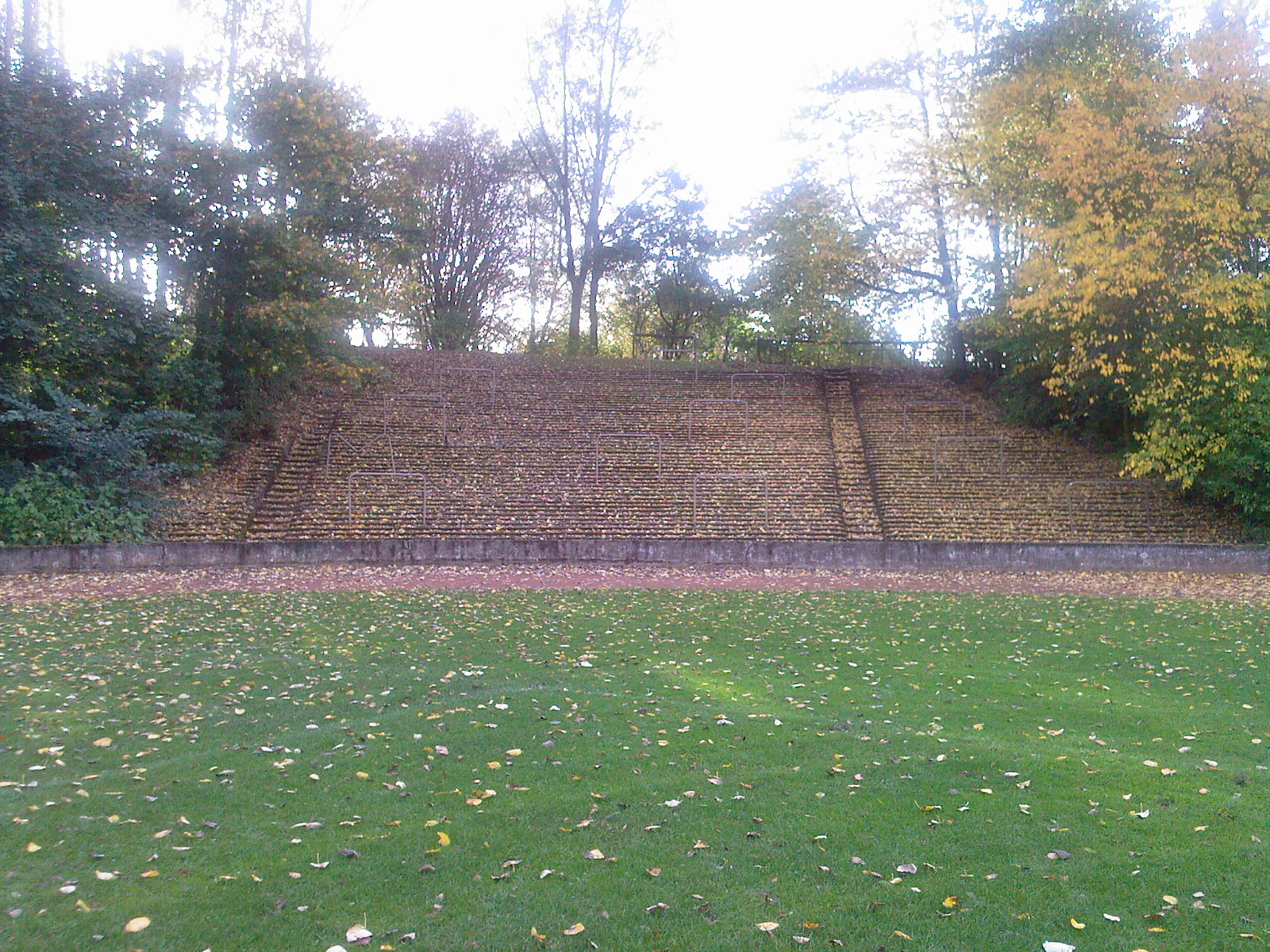
The remains of Cathkin Park, which was the site of the second Hampden Park.

Queen's Park, the oldest club in Scottish football, first played at a venue called Hampden Park on 25 October 1873. That ground was overlooked by a nearby terrace named after Englishman John Hampden, who fought for the roundheads in the English Civil War. It hosted the first Scottish Cup Final, played in 1874, and a Scotland v England match in 1878.

The club moved to the second Hampden Park, 150 yards from the original, because the Cathcart District Railway planned a new line through the site of the ground's western terrace. A lawn bowling club at the junction of Queen's Drive and Cathcart Road marks the site of the first Hampden. The second Hampden Park opened in October 1884. It became a regular home to the Scottish Cup Final, but Celtic Park shared some of the big matches including the Scotland v England fixture in 1894.

In the late 1890s, Queen's Park requested more land for development of the second Hampden Park. This was refused by the landlords, which led to the club seeking a new site. Henry Erskine Gordon agreed to sell 12 acres of land off Somerville Drive to Queen's Park in November 1899. James Miller designed twin grandstands along the south side of the ground with a pavilion wedged in between. The natural slopes were shaped to form banks of terracing, designed by Archibald Leitch. Construction of the new ground took over three years to complete; during the process, a disaster occurred at Ibrox in which part of the wooden terraces collapsed. In response, the terraces at Hampden were firmly set in the earthwork and innovative techniques were used to control spectators.

Third Lanark A.C. took over the second Hampden Park in 1903 and renamed it Cathkin Park after their previous ground of the same name. The club rebuilt the ground from scratch due to a failure to agree a fee for the whole stadium which resulted in Queen's Park removing the pavilion and other fittings (which they owned, while the ground itself was leased). During the first season following the move (1903–04, in which they finished as champions), Third Lanark played several of their home matches at the new Hampden while work was carried out on Cathkin Park. Third Lanark went out of business in 1967 and Cathkin Park is now a public park with much of the original terracing still evident.

In the stadium's first match on 31 October 1903 Queen's Park defeated Celtic 1–0 in the Scottish Football League, having played eight of their first nine league matches away from home and the other at the old Cathkin Park awaiting its opening. The first Scottish Cup Final played at the ground was an Old Firm match in 1904, attracting a record Scottish crowd of 64,672. The first Scotland v England match at the ground was played in April 1906 with 102,741 people in attendance, which established Hampden as the primary home of the Scotland team. Hampden Park was the biggest stadium in the world from the time of its opening until it was surpassed by the Maracanã in 1950. Along with Celtic Park and Ibrox, the city of Glasgow possessed the three largest football stadia in the world at the time Hampden opened.

=== Record attendances ===
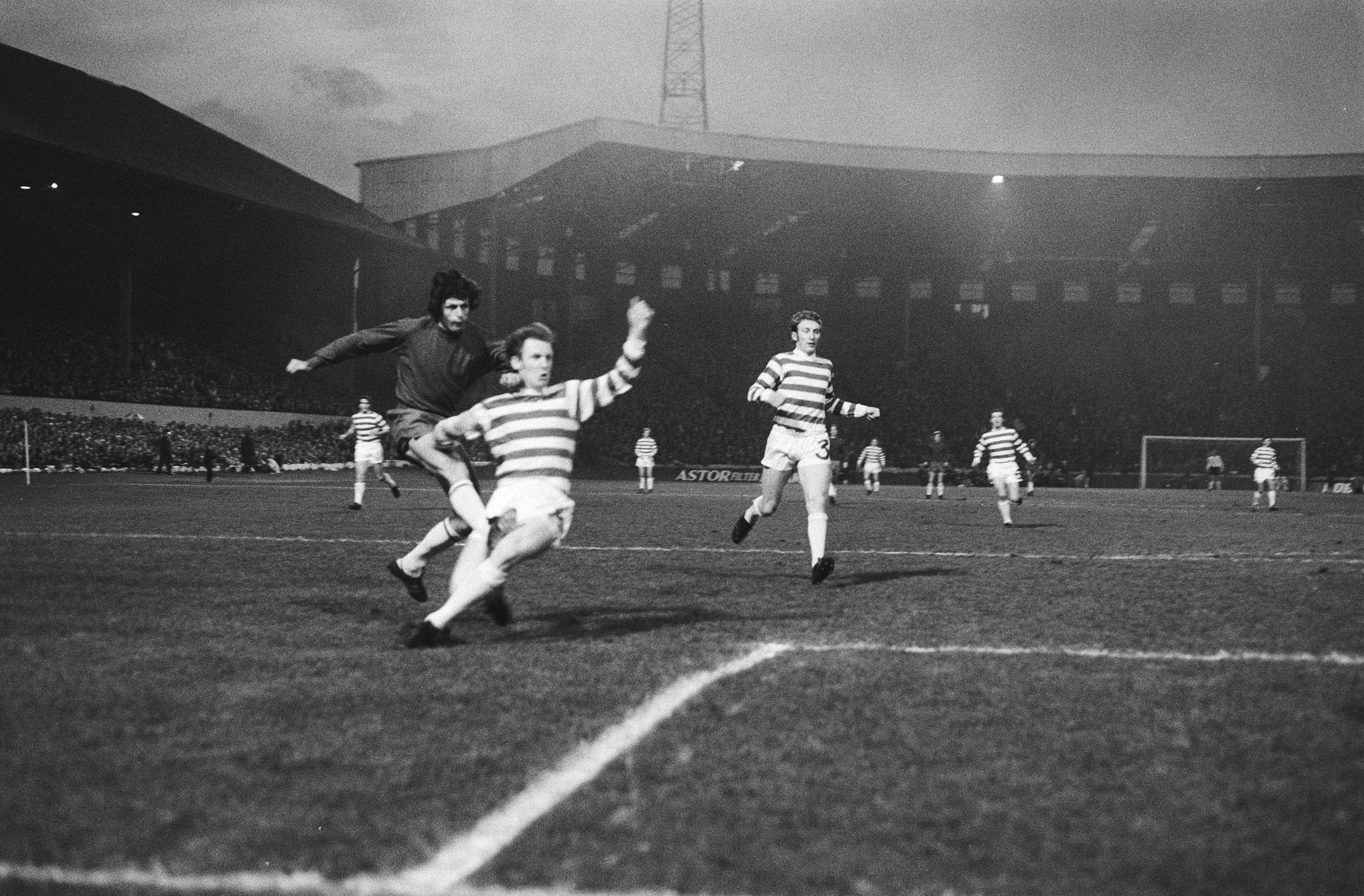
Celtic F.C. v AFC Ajax, 1971

Attendances continued to increase during the remainder of the 1900s, as 121,452 saw the 1908 Scotland v England match. The two Old Firm matches played for the 1909 Scottish Cup Final attracted a total of 131,000. After the second match there was a riot because there was confusion over what would happen next when the second match also ended in a draw. The fans believed that the replay would be played to a conclusion and demanded that a period of extra time be played. The Scottish Cup trophy was withheld as Hampden was not in a fit condition to host a second replay. In response to the riot, the Scottish Football Association decided to stop using Hampden as the Scottish Cup Final venue.

Queen's Park conducted extensive ground improvements after the 1909 riot. A new world record of 127,307 were in attendance to see Scotland play England in 1912. A fire in 1914 destroyed the pavilion, which was replaced by a four-storey structure with a press box on the roof. The Scottish Cup Final returned to Hampden in 1920, when a large crowd of 95,000 saw Kilmarnock win the cup against Albion Rovers. Record crowds attended the 1925 Scottish Cup Final, a 5–0 win for Celtic against Rangers, and the 1927 Scotland v England match, England's first win in the stadium. Hampden became the de facto sole venue of the Scottish Cup Final after 1925 and Queen's Park purchased more land in 1923 to bring the total to 33 acres. 25,000 places were added to the terraces and rigid crush barriers were installed in 1927.

World record crowds attended Scotland matches against England in 1931 and 1933. In 1933, Austria, who had beaten Scotland 5–0 in Vienna in 1931, became the first foreign national side to visit Hampden Park. After intervention from the Glasgow Corporation in 1935 regarding public order and safety of the huge, ever-increasing crowds attending matches in the city, Queen's Park and Hampden defeated a rival bid from Rangers and Ibrox – which itself already had a capacity well over 100,000 – to enlarge the ground at the expense of the club, in exchange for becoming the official venue for the Scotland v England fixture and the Cup Final (and collect a designated portion of gate receipts from these matches), while the city would provide improvements in transport provision and other infrastructure to support the regular influx of spectators to the venue. This work increased the official theoretical capacity of the ground to 183,388 in 1937, but the SFA were only allowed to issue 150,000 tickets for games. The 1937 Scotland v England match had an official attendance of 149,415, but at least 20,000 more people entered the ground without tickets. A week later the 1937 Scottish Cup Final between Celtic and Aberdeen drew an official crowd of 147,365, with 20,000 more people locked outside; this stood as a world record for a club match until 1963. The 1938 and 1939 cup finals were contested by provincial sides and did not test the new capacity, but the England match of 1939 attracted 149,269.

=== Wartime ===
During the Second World War, matches at heavily attended grounds were initially prohibited due to the fear of aerial bombing by the Luftwaffe. Scottish national league and cup competitions were suspended for the duration of the war, but regional league and cup competitions were established in their place. Attendance was initially restricted to 50 percent of capacity; therefore, when 75,000 attended a wartime cup final in May 1940, it was the maximum permitted. The Parashots, a forerunner of the Home Guard, set up a command post at Lesser Hampden in 1940. A government official presented an order demanding that both the Hampden and Lesser Hampden pitches be ploughed and used to plant vegetables, but the Queen's Park committee chose to ignore the order and the government did not pursue it. Wartime internationals were played at Hampden, and 91,000 saw Scotland beat England 5–4 on 18 April 1942.

=== Post-war ===
After the Second World War ended in 1945, Hampden started to host Scotland matches more frequently. Before then, Hampden had only hosted 15 matches against England and one match each against Austria and Czechoslovakia. During the post-war attendance boom, Hampden was the only stadium big enough to host the crowds who wanted to see the team. Matches that would have ordinarily attracted a crowd of 40,000 were being attended by nearly 100,000. A fire on 25 December 1945 destroyed the stadium press box and damaged offices. The press box was replaced with a plainer two-storey structure that overhung the pitch. The Hampden fixture list was also expanded by the new Scottish League Cup competition. In 1947, Rangers defeated Aberdeen in the first League Cup Final, a year after a 135,000 crowd watched the last edition of its wartime predecessor, the Southern League Cup, played between the same teams. The capacity of the ground was officially cut to 135,000 following the Burnden Park disaster in Bolton in March 1946, but before that reduction was confirmed, 139,468 watched the Scotland v England Victory International on 13 April of that year.

The re-entry of the Home Nations into FIFA in 1947 was marked by a match between a Great Britain and a Rest of Europe select on 10 May 1947. Great Britain won 6–1 and 130,000 people attended. Unusually, a league match between Third Lanark and Hibernian was played immediately afterwards at Hampden because Cathkin Park was undergoing repair work. The first FIFA World Cup qualification match played at Hampden was a 2–0 win for Scotland against Wales on 9 November 1949; this match was also part of the 1950 British Home Championship. The win appeared to guarantee Scotland qualification for the 1950 FIFA World Cup because the top two finishers in the Championship were offered places in the tournament, but the SFA decreed that they would only send a team if they were British champions. Scotland only needed a draw against England at Hampden to meet that condition but lost 1–0.

The Coronation Cup, a competition to mark the Coronation of Queen Elizabeth II, was held in Glasgow during May 1953. Four major clubs from each of Scotland and England were invited, with the Old Firm clubs playing their matches at Hampden. Celtic and Hibernian progressed to the final, and a crowd of 117,060 saw Celtic win 2–0.

Scotland hosted the Magical Magyars of Hungary in December 1954 in front of 113,506 fans. The Scots put up a good fight against one of the most outstanding teams in the world at the time, but eventually lost 4–2. Scotland qualified for the 1958 FIFA World Cup by defeating Spain, including Luis Suarez, Ladislao Kubala and Alfredo Di Stéfano, at Hampden.

=== 1960s and 1970s ===
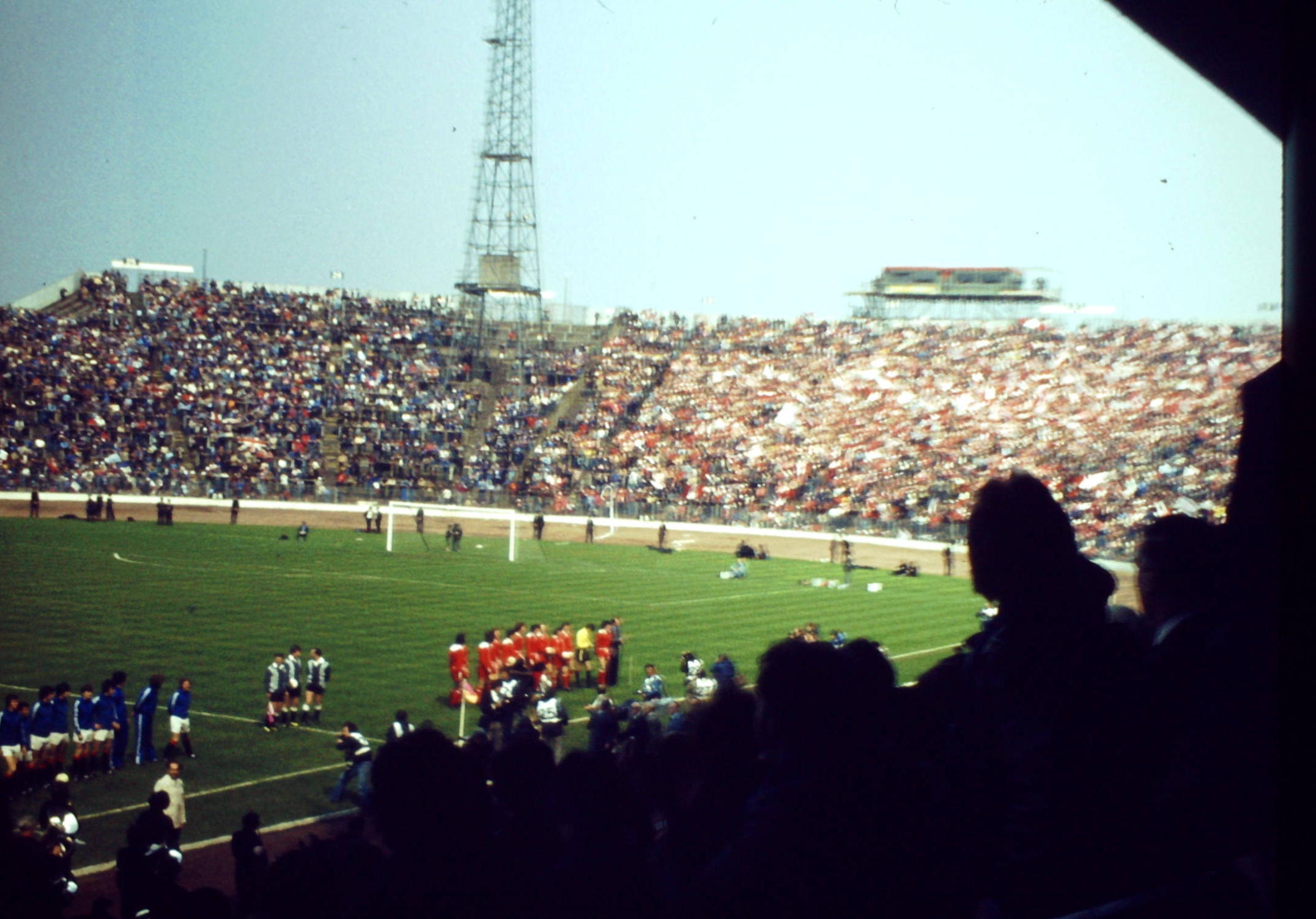
Aberdeen and Rangers teams line up before the 1978 Scottish Cup Final at Hampden.

Hampden hosted the 1960 European Cup Final; Real Madrid defeated Eintracht Frankfurt 7–3 with 130,000 people in attendance. Floodlights were installed at Hampden in 1961 and were inaugurated with a friendly match between Eintracht Frankfurt and Rangers. The ground then also hosted the 1962 and 1966 finals of the European Cup Winners' Cup. The attendances for each of these finals was less than 50,000, and the SFA did not offer to host another European final until the 1976 European Cup Final, in which Bayern Munich defeated St Etienne. St Etienne believed that two of their efforts which hit the square crossbar and rebounded into play would have resulted in goals if it had been round, and the French club subsequently bought the goalposts and displayed them in their museum.

After Celtic won the 1967 European Cup Final, the home leg of their Intercontinental Cup tie against Racing Club was held at Hampden. Celtic won 1–0 at Hampden, but lost the tie after a play-off in Montevideo. In 1970, Celtic played in the semi-finals of the European Cup against English league champions, Leeds United. Celtic chose to move their home leg of the tie from their Celtic Park home to Hampden, which had a far greater capacity. A crowd of 136,505, a record for any match in UEFA competition, saw Celtic win 2–1 (3–1 on aggregate) to advance to the 1970 European Cup Final. Celtic also played European Cup ties against Ajax and Rosenborg at Hampden during the 1970s.

A fire was deliberately started in the south stand in October 1968, destroying offices, 1,400 seats and one of the team dressing rooms. The fire caused the 1968–69 Scottish League Cup Final to be postponed until April. By 1970 Hampden was starting to age as a stadium. Wembley had been revamped for the 1966 World Cup, while other major stadia were being constructed for tournaments. Public safety was emphasized after the Ibrox disaster of January 1971, when 66 spectators were crushed to death. A benefit match was played at Hampden, while the Safety of Sports Grounds Act 1975 compelled stadium authorities to obtain licences from local officials, impose crowd segregation and restrict attendances. Pittodrie and Ibrox were converted into all-seater stadiums, while Hampden's capacity was reduced to 81,000.

Scotland secured qualification for the 1974 FIFA World Cup at Hampden, with a 2–1 victory over Czechoslovakia. Kenny Dalglish scored the winning goal against England in 1976 by nutmegging Ray Clemence. In 1977, Scotland again won against Czechoslovakia to move towards qualification for the 1978 FIFA World Cup. Scotland played a friendly match against world champions Argentina in 1979; the talented, 18-year-old Diego Maradona scored a goal in a 3–1 win for the visitors.

=== 1990s re–development ===
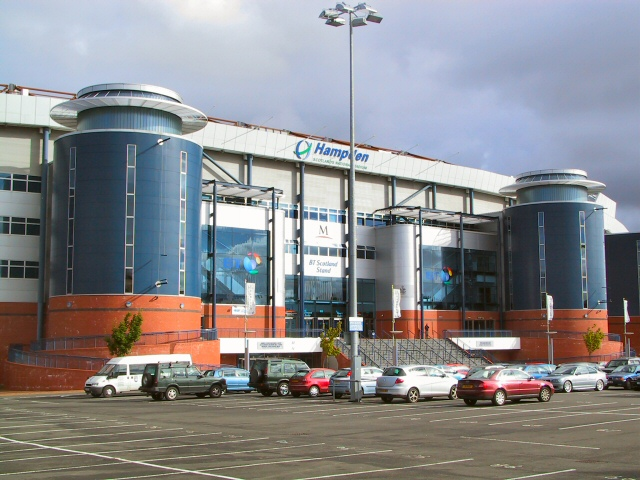
Exterior of Hampden's South Stand, which was opened in 1999

During the late 1970s, it became apparent that the facilities at Hampden were in need of renewal. As an amateur club, Queen's Park could not possibly fund the works, while Glasgow District Council withdrew funding and the UK Government decided not to fund it either. Queen's Park considered selling Hampden, but a public appeal and minor repair work kept the stadium open during the 1980s. The riot after the 1980 Scottish Cup Final prompted reforms, as alcohol was banned from football stadia in Scotland.

The first phase of the redevelopment involved the demolition of the North Stand, the concreting of all terraces and the building of a block of turnstiles around the upper section of the East Terrace. This work, begun in October 1981 and completed in 1986, reduced the capacity to 74,370 and cost £3 million. A second phase had been planned to begin in 1988, but the release of the Taylor Report caused the plans to be redrawn and the proposed costs escalated to £25 million. Scotland hosted the 1989 FIFA Under-16 World Cup, with the Scots contesting the final against Saudi Arabia at Hampden. In 1987, the square goalposts that had been used since the stadium opened were banned by FIFA.

After the cancellation of the annual Scotland v England fixture in 1989, questions were raised as to whether Scottish football required a separate national stadium. Rangers proposed Ibrox as an alternative venue, while Murrayfield was about to be redeveloped without public funding. None of these arguments impressed the National Stadium committee, which consisted of the SFA, Scottish Football League and Queen's Park. The West Terrace was converted to seating in 1991 for only £700,000, but this left two terraces and therefore disqualified Hampden from hosting FIFA World Cup qualification matches.

The UK Government eventually provided a grant of £3.5 million in 1992, which allowed work to begin on a £12 million project to convert Hampden into an all-seater stadium. The last match played in front of the sloping terraces was the 1992 Scottish League Cup Final. Within a year, the east and north parts of the ground had been converted from terracing to seats, and the partially rebuilt Hampden was re-opened for a friendly match between Scotland and Netherlands on 23 March 1994. It was then also used for the later stages of the 1993–94 Scottish Cup competition. As the capacity of the old South Stand had been limited to 4,500, the total capacity of Hampden had been reduced to approximately 37,000. With Celtic Park also undergoing extensive redevelopment to become all-seater, Celtic spent the 1994–95 season groundsharing at Hampden, at a cost of £500,000 rent.

The final stage of the renovation began in November 1997, with its £59 million cost funded by the National Lottery. There was a cost overrun and a fraud squad investigated alleged financial irregularities. The South Stand was replaced and the stadium was re-opened for the 1999 Scottish Cup Final. The ground now has a capacity of 51,866. Queen's Park retained ownership of the ground, with the SFA holding a lease that ran until 2020.

=== Recent history ===
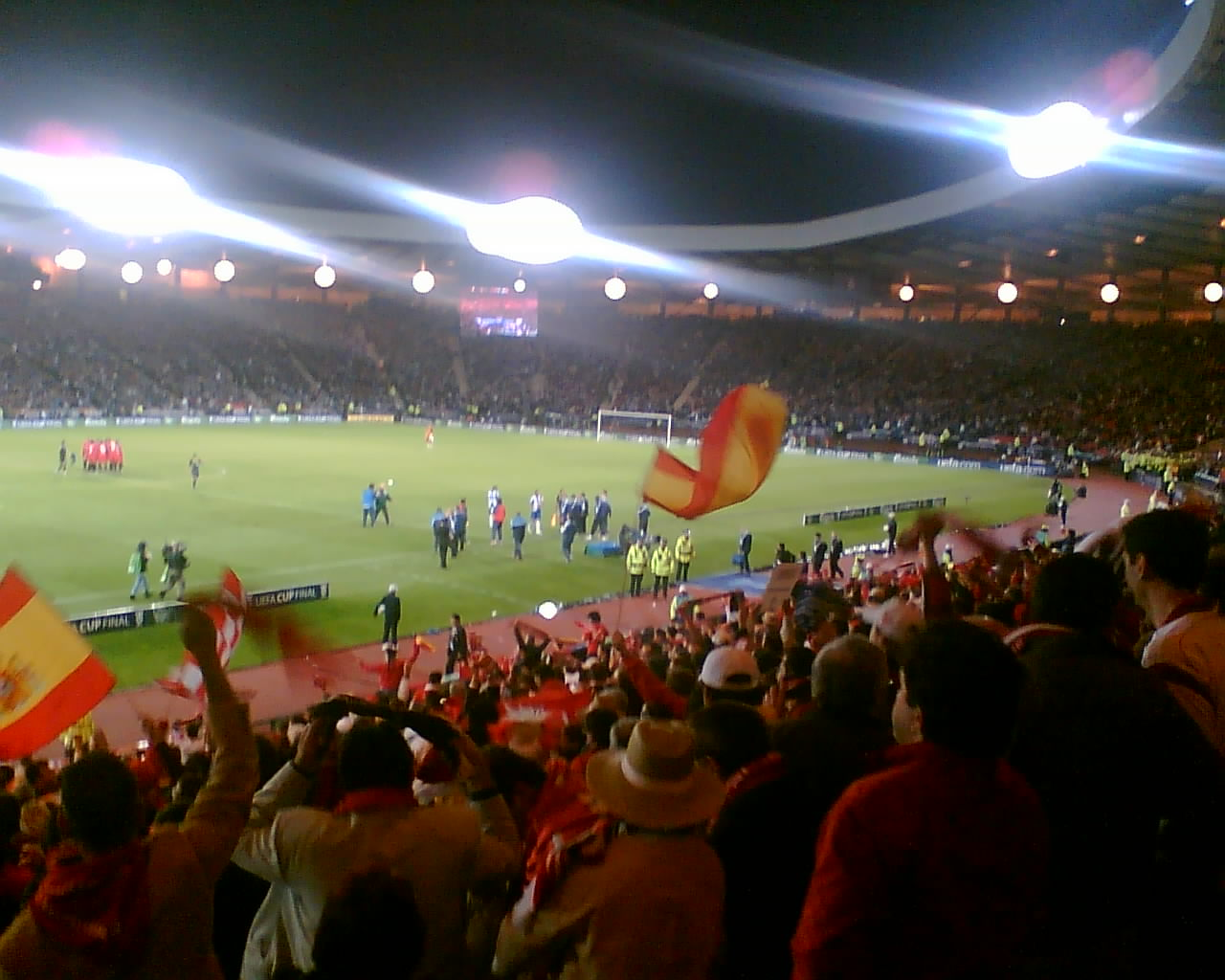
Hampden hosted the 2007 UEFA Cup final

Real Madrid were again victorious when Hampden Park hosted the 2002 UEFA Champions League Final, defeating Bayer Leverkusen, with Zinedine Zidane scoring the winning goal with a left-foot volley. Hampden then hosted the 2007 UEFA Cup Final and was one of the venues for football at the 2012 Summer Olympics, hosting three matches in the men's tournament and five in the women's tournament. One of the matches was delayed after the North Korean team protested against the flag of South Korea being used mistakenly to represent their players. Later in 2012, a Scotland women's national football team game was played at Hampden for the first time, when it hosted the first leg of a European Championship qualifying playoff against Spain.

Hampden was temporarily converted into an athletics stadium for the 2014 Commonwealth Games. It hosted its last international game before the conversion work on 15 November 2013 and Queen's Park temporarily played their home games at the Excelsior Stadium in Airdrie. Due to the works being carried out at the Olympic Stadium, the 2014 London Grand Prix was renamed the Glasgow Grand Prix and hosted by Hampden. The conversion works involved the removal of eight rows of seating, which reduced the capacity to 44,000. Hampden was converted back into a football stadium after the Commonwealth Games.

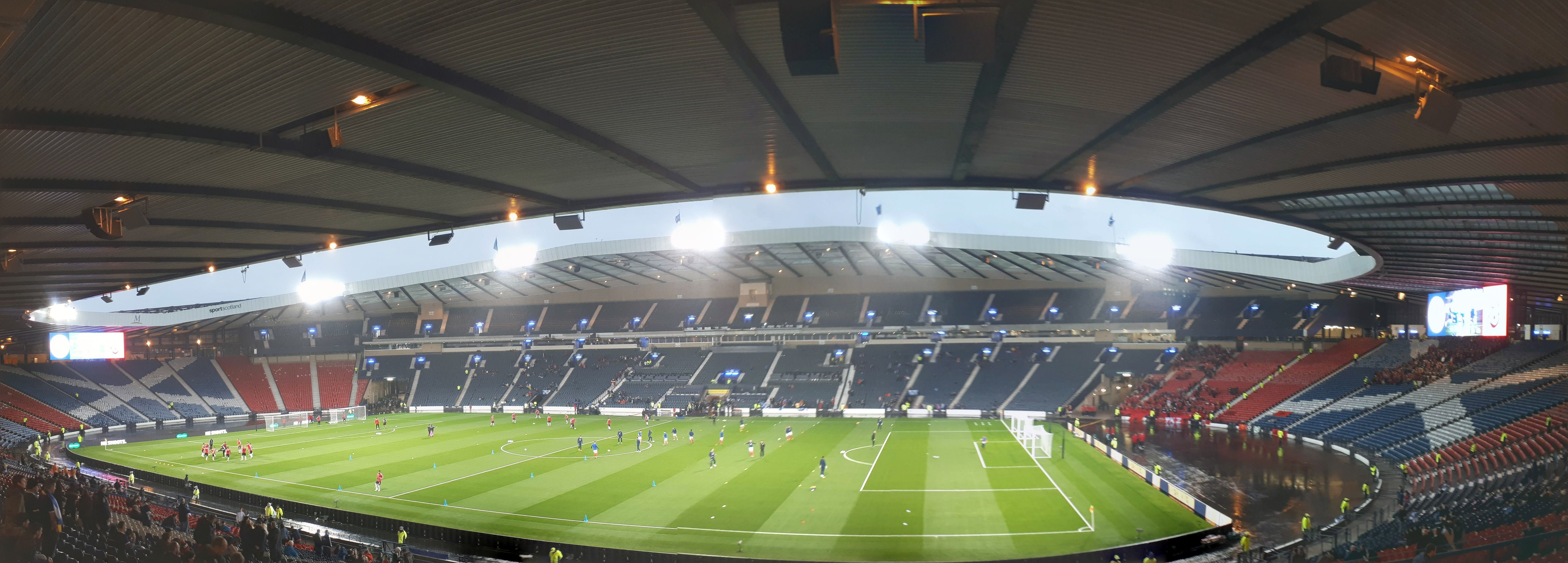
Interior of Hampden Park pitch, 2018

With their lease on Hampden due to expire in 2020, the SFA canvassed opinion from its member clubs about where Scotland games should be played. In September 2018, the SFA announced an agreement to purchase Hampden from Queen's Park. As part of the deal, Lesser Hampden was redeveloped and became the home stadium for Queen's Park. As of August 2020, the SFA had taken ownership of Hampden and a new facility was under construction at Lesser Hampden. Architects drew up plans in 2020 for a major redevelopment of Hampden, but this was contingent on a 2030 World Cup bid that did not materialise.

Queen's Park played their last match at Hampden on 20 March 2021, as their lease expired at the end of that month. Queen's Park temporarily moved back into Hampden for the 2023–24 season, having agreed a deal with the SFA to rent the stadium while allowing the Scotland national teams to use Lesser Hampden as a training pitch. In August 2024, Rangers played four home matches at Hampden (including a UEFA Champions League qualifier), due to delays with a construction project at Ibrox.

The SFA registered its interest in hosting a European club final at Hampden in either 2026 or 2027, but was unsuccessful. Naming rights were sold for the first time in December 2025, with the stadium becoming officially known as Barclays Hampden.

== Tournament matches ==
=== UEFA Euro 2020 ===
In September 2014, Hampden was one of 13 venues chosen to host matches in the UEFA Euro 2020 tournament. It held three group games and one round of sixteen match, with attendances restricted to 25% of its capacity due to the COVID-19 pandemic.

Date	Time	Team #1	Score	Team #2	Round	Attendance
14 June 2021	14:00	Scotland	0–2	Czech Republic	Group D	9,847
18 June 2021	17:00	Croatia	1–1	Czech Republic	Group D	5,607
22 June 2021	20:00	Croatia	3–1	Scotland	Group D	9,896
29 June 2021	20:00	Sweden	1–2 (a.e.t)	Ukraine	Round of 16	9,221

=== UEFA Euro 2028 ===
After a proposed bid for the 2030 World Cup was dropped, the SFA instead entered a multinational bid to host some UEFA Euro 2028 games at Hampden that was successful.

Date	Time (BST)	Team #1	Result	Team #2	Round	Spectators
10 June 2028	--:--	A3	–	A4	Group A	
13 June 2028	--:--	Scotland if Qualified	–	F2	Group F	
17 June 2028	--:--	Scotland if Qualified	–	F3	Group F	
21 June 2028	--:--	F4	–	Scotland if Qualified	Group F	
26 June 2028	--:--	Winner Group F	–	3rd Group A/B/C	Round of 16	
1 July 2028	--:--	Winner Match 44	–	Winner Match 43	Quarter-finals	

== Hampden Roar ==
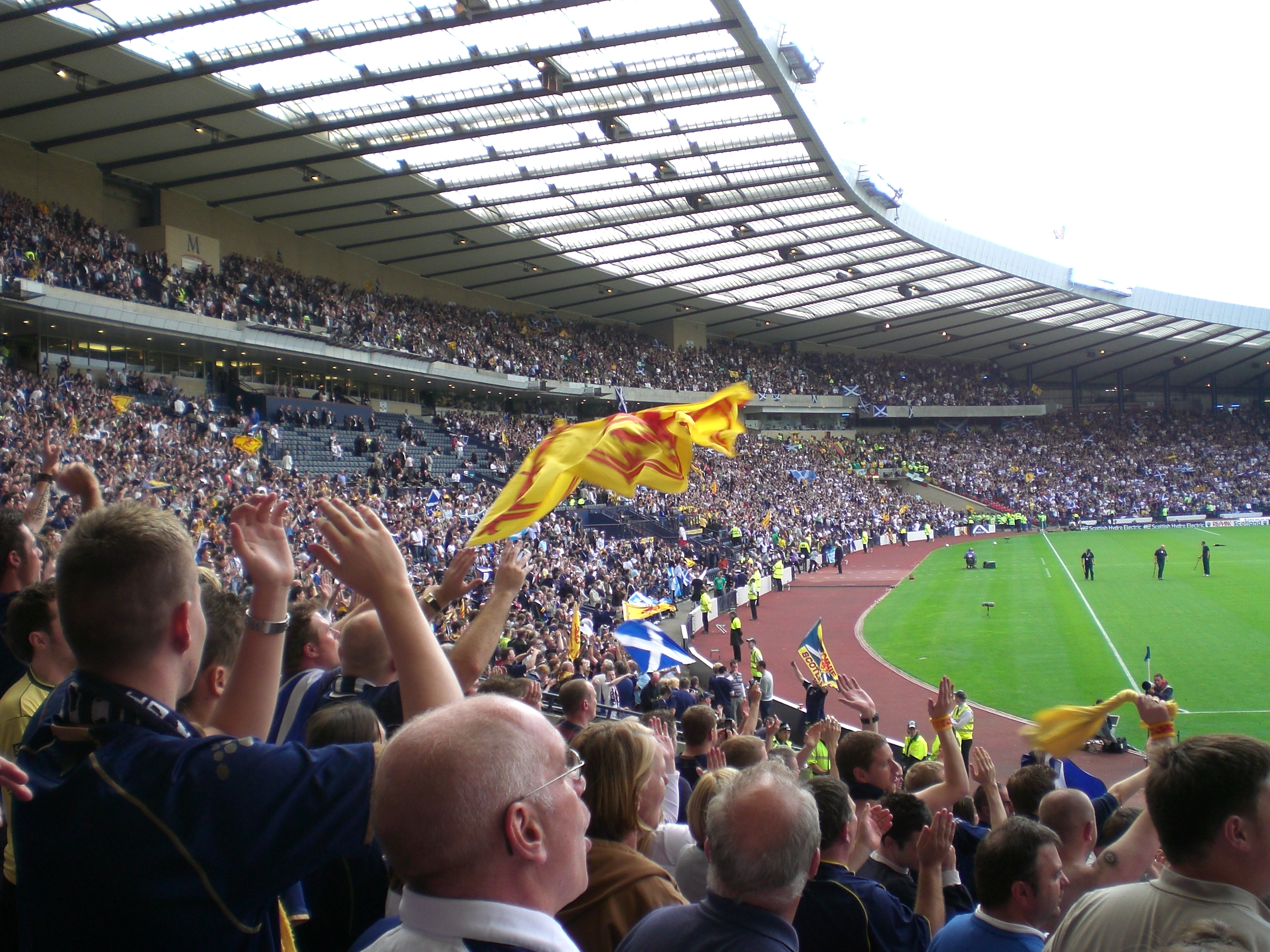
Scotland fans inside Hampden Stadium

The football match crowd at Hampden were renowned for creating the Hampden Roar and trying to terrify opposing teams. The stadium's capacity exceeded 100,000 from the early 1900s until the 1980s and the Roar could be heard whenever Scotland scored an important goal. After the renovation of the stadium and the reduced capacities, the roar has become more muted.

The Hampden Roar was first noticed in a game against England in 1929. Scotland, who had played the second half with ten players due to an injury to Alex Jackson, equalised in the final minute with a goal from Alec Cheyne direct from a corner kick. The roar that followed the goal was so loud that Jackson, who was a mile away in the Glasgow Victoria Infirmary, could tell that Scotland had scored.

The phrase Hampden Roar is also used as rhyming slang; People from Glasgow may ask "What's the Hampden?" ("What's the score?", idiom for "What's happening / what's going on?").

In April 2018, the stadium operating company commissioned a study into the noise levels produced at Hampden during an Old Firm match. This found a peak noise level of 115 decibels, after goals were scored, and 109 decibels when the teams first came onto the field. These findings were much higher than those recorded in a 2014 study of Premier League grounds (maximum of 84 decibels), but well short of the world record set by a National Football League match at the Arrowhead Stadium in Kansas City (142 decibels).

== Structure and facilities ==
Hampden is an all-seated bowl stadium, although the ground is split into four geographic sections, officially known as the North, East, South and West Stands. Due to the dominance of the Old Firm within Scottish football and their regular qualification for cup matches played at Hampden, the East and West stands are commonly known as the Celtic and Rangers ends. The East Stand has 12,800 seats on a single tier of 53 rows. The two end stands are up to 140 metres away from the pitch, due to Hampden retaining its bowl shape after it was redeveloped. This distance is almost as great as if Hampden included an athletics track, although the distance between the pitch and the two side stands is more comparable to a normal football stadium.

The South Stand is the main stand of the stadium, as it holds the technical areas, dressing rooms, indoor warm-up area, executive boxes, lounges and media facilities. It has been sponsored by BT Scotland since 1998. The South Stand is also the only part of the stadium split into two tiers, although there is also a small gallery above the North Stand that has 290 seats and access to lounges. The North Stand accommodates 9,100 spectators in 46 rows. The total capacity of the stadium is 51,866. The capacity was temporarily reduced to 44,000 for the 2014 Commonwealth Games, as the running track raised the field level by 1.9 metres.

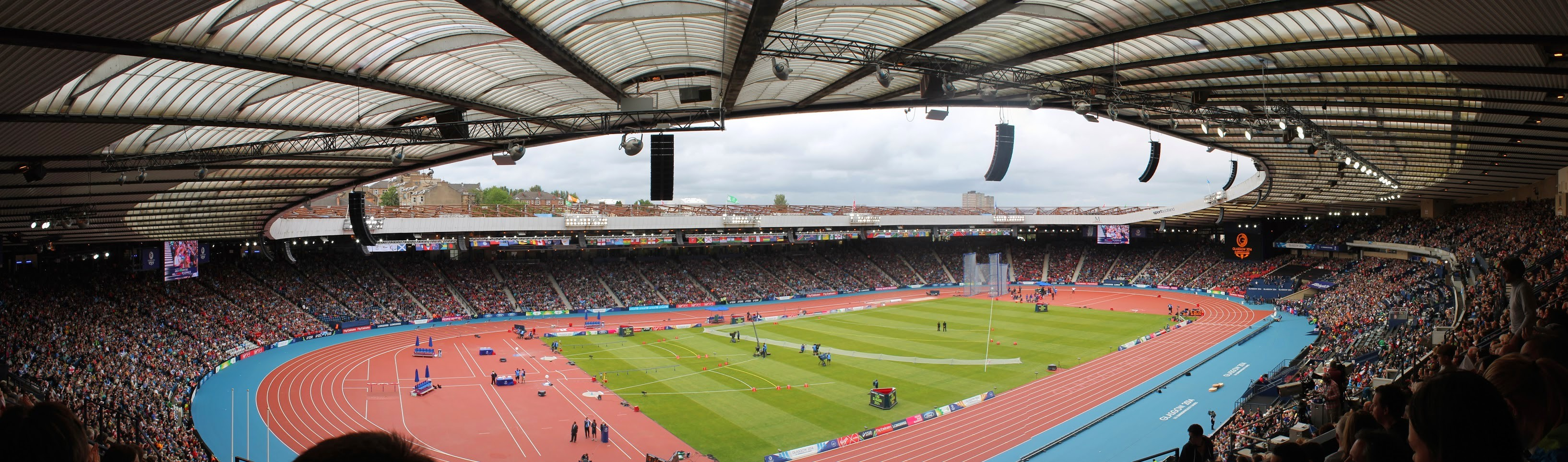
Panoramic view of Hampden Park during the 2014 Commonwealth Games

The redeveloped Hampden holds UEFA category four status. The Scottish Football Museum, which opened in 2001, is located within Hampden. Part of the museum is the Scottish Football Hall of Fame. A distinctive feature of the old Hampden, the press box which sat on the roof of the old South Stand, is also exhibited at the museum. The offices of the Scottish Football Association and the Scottish Professional Football League are located within Hampden.

Lesser Hampden is a football stadium located immediately beside the western end of Hampden Park. The ground was constructed in the early 1920s after additional ground was purchased to expand the main stadium. Queen's Park proposed in 1990 to sell off Lesser Hampden to fund redevelopment works on the main stadium, but this was rejected by planners. Lesser Hampden was refurbished for use as a warm-up area during the 2014 Commonwealth Games. When the SFA took ownership of Hampden, new stands were constructed at Lesser Hampden for it to be used again as a football stadium.

== Other uses ==
=== Sports other than football ===
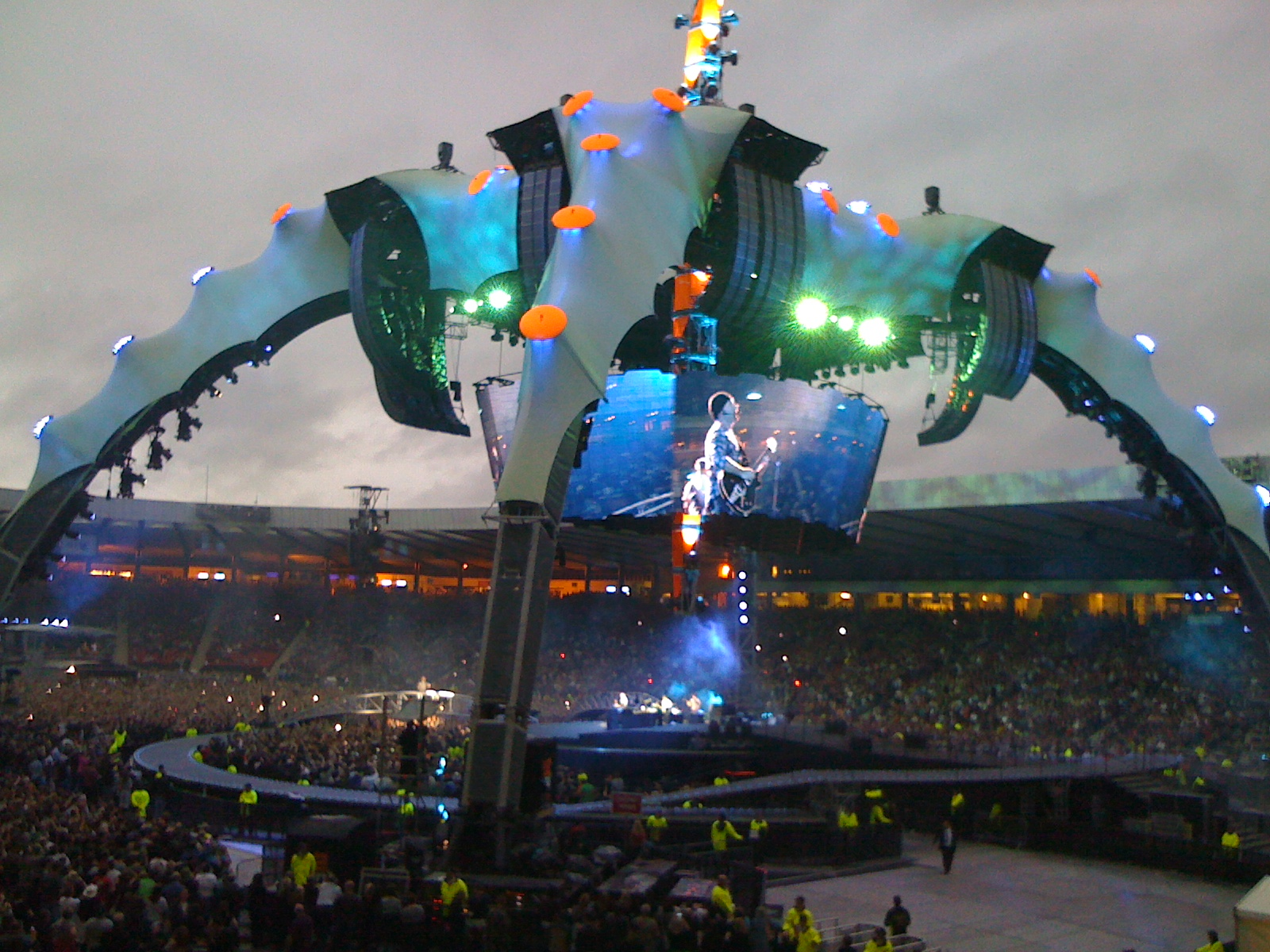
U2 in concert at Hampden in August 2009, as part of the 360° Tour. The pitch was damaged by the concert, resulting in a postponement of a Queen's Park football match.

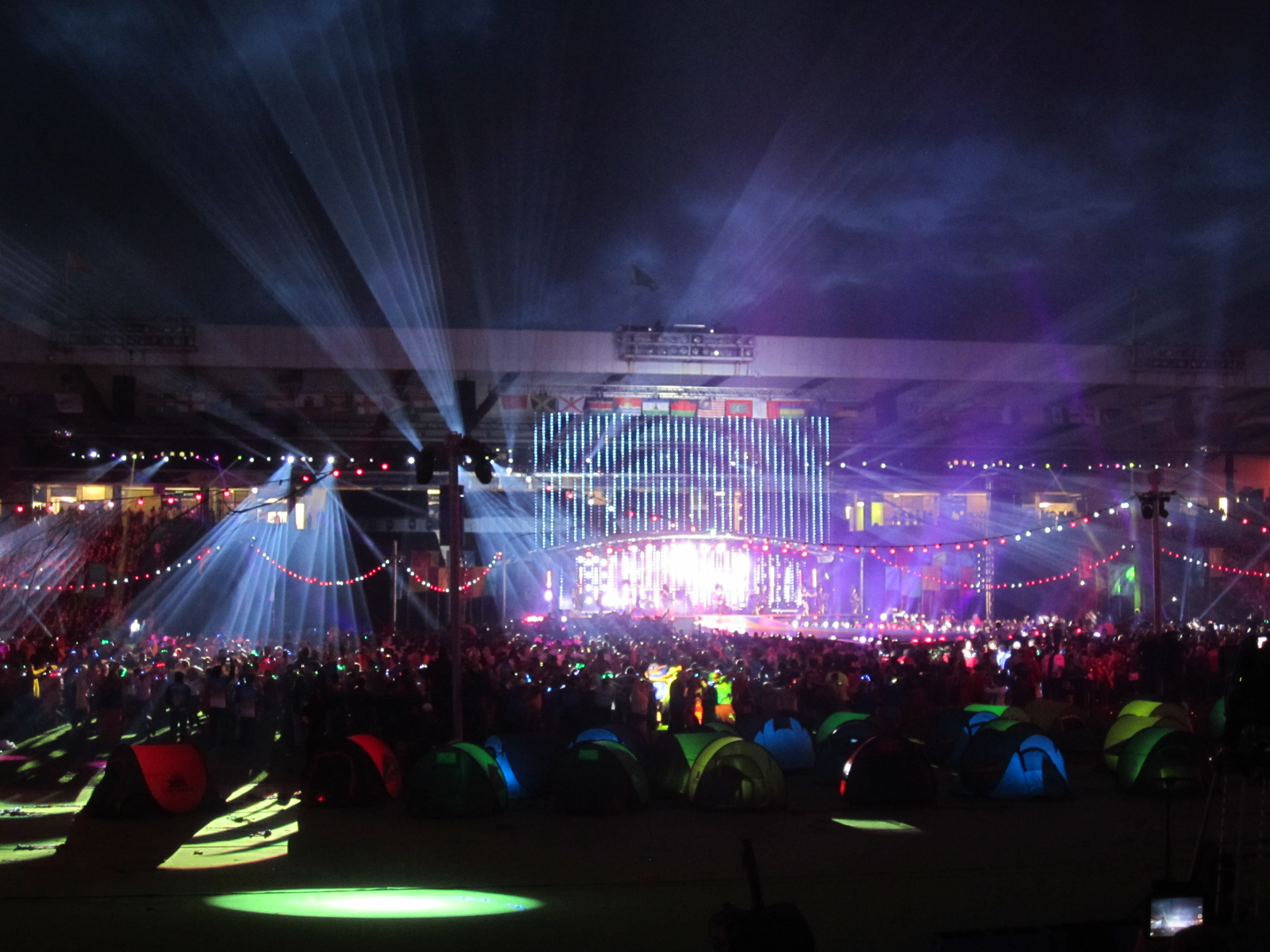
Hampden Park hosted the 2014 Commonwealth Games closing ceremony

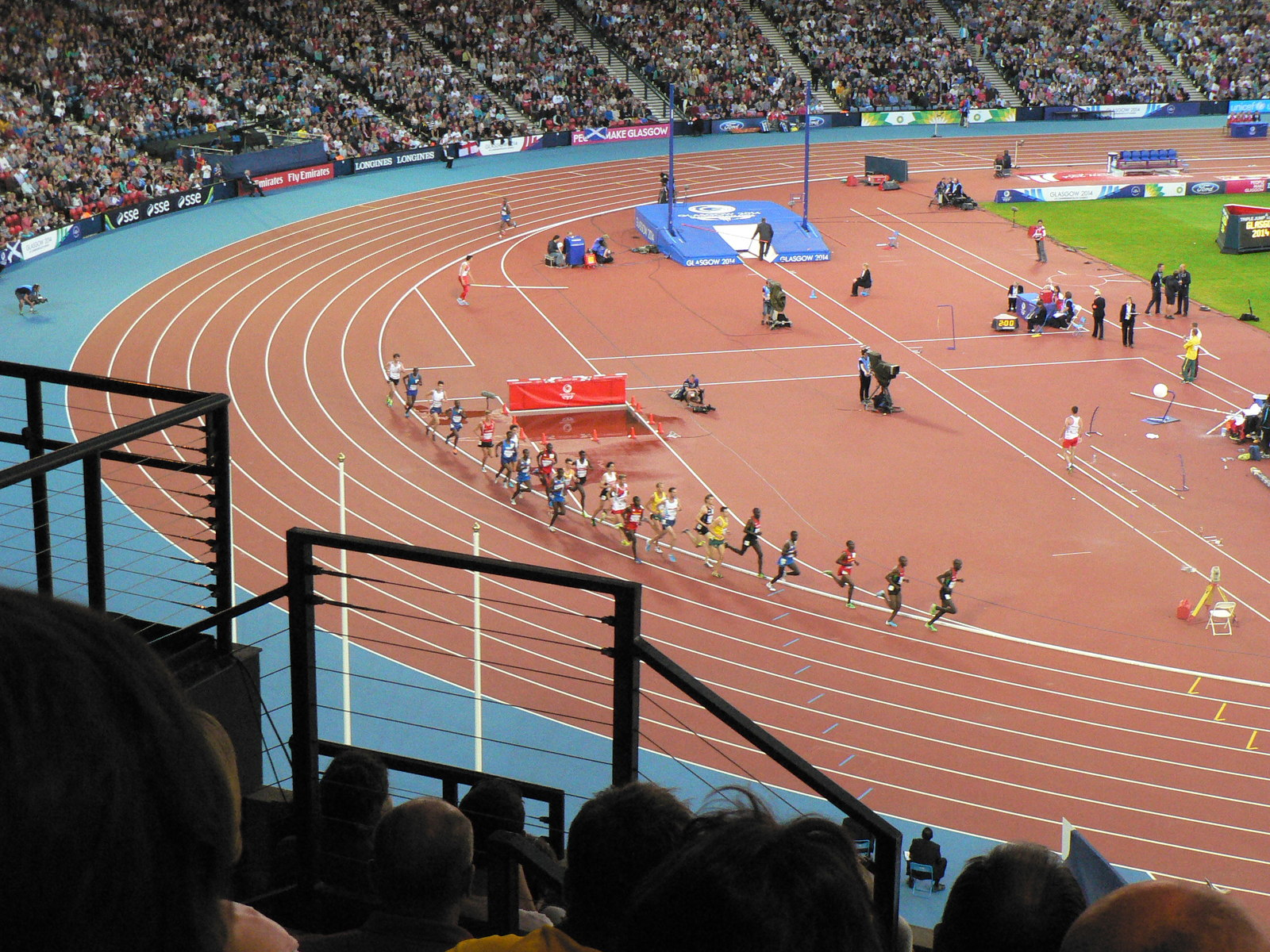
The stadium played host to the Athletics events during the 2014 Commonwealth Games

Hampden Park has held four full rugby union international matches. The first was in 1906, when the Scottish Rugby Union chose to play their match against the touring South Africans at Hampden because no rugby ground could satisfy the demand to see the visitors. A crowd of over 30,000 saw Scotland win 6–0. The redeveloped Hampden served as one of the 1999 Rugby World Cup venues, over 90 years later. Scotland played Romania in a friendly match before the tournament and South Africa played Uruguay in a tournament pool match. The only rugby union international played at Hampden since then was in November 2004, between Scotland and Australia.

Hampden also hosted a club rugby union match between Glasgow Warriors and Edinburgh Rugby on 22 December 2024, the first leg of their tie in the United Rugby Championship and 1872 Cup. Glasgow triumphed 33–14 in front of 27,538 fans, a Warriors home record.

Hampden hosted the Scottish Amateur Athletics Association championships during the 1920s and 1930s, with the original Meadowbank Stadium used as an alternative venue. Eric Liddell won the 110, 220 and 440 yard dashes in the 1924 championship. His last competition in Britain was the 1925 championship, when he won the 220 yards race for a record fifth time. Hampden was temporarily converted to stage the athletics events for the 2014 Commonwealth Games. It was also used for the closing ceremony.

Suzanne Lenglen, the French professional tennis player, played an exhibition match against Vivian Dewhurst at Hampden in 1927. A crowd of 10,000 saw that match and another between male players Howard Kinsey and Karel Koželuh.

During the Second World War, American armed forces based in Scotland played games of softball, baseball and American football at Hampden. American football returned to Hampden in 1998, when the NFL Europe team Scottish Claymores shared home games between Hampden and Murrayfield. World Bowl XI was held at Hampden in 2003, but after the 2004 season the Claymores folded and were replaced by the Hamburg Sea Devils.

Hampden was the home of the Glasgow Tigers speedway team from 1969 until 1972. Poor crowds, escalating costs and the refusal of the city council to allow music to be played at events contributed to the team moving to Cliftonhill, in Coatbridge. Glasgow Tigers' Svein Kaasa was killed during a race at Hampden Park on 29 September 1972.

The redeveloped Hampden was the venue for a boxing card headlined by former world champion Mike Tyson in June 2000. Tyson knocked down Lou Savarese after just 12 seconds of the fight, which the referee stopped after 38 seconds. The fight ended in farce as the referee, who had been attempting to separate the two fighters, was also knocked down by Tyson. The disappointed crowd booed Tyson out of the ring, while former fighters Jim Watt and Barry McGuigan criticised his actions. After the fight, Tyson claimed that he wanted to eat the children of world champion Lennox Lewis, which also drew criticism.

=== Uses other than sport ===
The 50th anniversary Conventicle of the Boys' Brigade, which had been founded in Glasgow by William Alexander Smith, was staged at Hampden in 1933. 130,000 people were inside the ground, while another 100,000 stood outside singing Psalms. American evangelical Christian missionary Billy Graham had an "All Scotland Crusade" during the spring of 1955. The major outdoor event of the tour was at Hampden, where a crowd of 100,000 heard him speak.

==== Concerts ====
Genesis and Paul Young performed in the first concert at Hampden, in 1987. The Rolling Stones played there in 1990, during their Urban Jungle Tour. Since the redevelopment of Hampden was completed in 1999, many acts have performed there, including The Rolling Stones, Tina Turner, Rod Stewart, Bon Jovi, Eagles, Oasis, George Michael, the Red Hot Chili Peppers, Neil Diamond, Take That, AC/DC, Bruce Springsteen, Coldplay, Pink, Paul McCartney, Rihanna, The Stone Roses, Gerry Cinnamon and Beyoncé. The damage caused to the Hampden pitch by a U2 concert in August 2009 forced a Queen's Park league match to be postponed. Ed Sheeran was the first act in history to perform at the Hampden three times on a single tour.

Date	Performer(s)	Opening act(s)	Tour/Event	Attendance	Notes
26 June 1987	Genesis	Paul Young	Invisible Touch Tour		
9 July 1990	The Rolling Stones	Gun	Urban Jungle Tour		
3 July 1999	Rod Stewart	The Proclaimers, Bjorn Again, Babylon Zoo			
7 July 2000	Tina Turner	John Fogerty	Twenty Four Seven Tour		
8 June 2001	Bon Jovi	Matchbox Twenty, Delirious?	One Wild Night Tour		
22 July 2001	Eagles		An Evening With the Eagles		
4 August 2001	Robbie Williams		Weddings, Barmitzvahs & Stadiums Tour		
5 August 2001	Robbie Williams		Weddings, Barmitzvahs & Stadiums Tour		
24 June 2003	Eminem	D12, Xzibit, Cypress Hill	Anger Management Tour		
21 June 2005	U2	Black Rebel Motorcycle Club, Interpol	Vertigo Tour	53,395 / 53,395	
29 June 2005	Oasis	Super Furry Animals	Don't Believe the Truth Tour		
3 June 2006	Bon Jovi	Nickelback	Have a Nice Day Tour	42,488 / 42,488	
23 June 2006	Eagles		Farewell I Tour		
25 August 2006	The Rolling Stones	The Charlatans	A Bigger Bang Tour		
1 September 2006	Robbie Williams	Basement Jaxx	Close Encounters Tour		
2 September 2006	Robbie Williams	Basement Jaxx	Close Encounters Tour		
17 June 2007	George Michael	Sophie Ellis-Bextor	25 Live	53,024 / 53,024	
5 July 2007	Rod Stewart	The Pretenders	Rockin' in the Round Tour		
23 August 2007	Red Hot Chili Peppers	Biffy Clyro, Reverend and the Makers	Stadium Arcadium World Tour	38,519 / 40,000	
5 June 2008	Neil Diamond		2008 World Tour		
21 June 2008	Bon Jovi	The Feeling	Lost Highway Tour	39,756 / 39,756	
19 June 2009	Take That	The Saturdays, James Morrison, The Script	Take That Present:The Circus Live		
20 June 2009	Take That	The Saturdays, James Morrison, The Script	Take That Present:The Circus Live		
21 June 2009	Take That	The Saturdays, James Morrison, The Script	Take That Present:The Circus Live		
30 June 2009	AC/DC	The Answer, The Subways	Black Ice World Tour	52,000 / 52,000	
4 July 2009	Eagles		Long Road Out of Eden Tour		
14 July 2009	Bruce Springsteen and the E Street Band		Working on a Dream Tour	50,544 / 50,544	
18 August 2009	U2	Glasvegas, The Hours	U2 360° Tour	50,917 / 50,917	
16 September 2009	Coldplay	Jay-Z, White Lies	Viva la Vida Tour		
20 June 2010	Paul McCartney	Sharleen Spiteri	Up and Coming Tour		
26 June 2010	P!nk		The Funhouse Summer Carnival		
22 June 2011	Take That	Pet Shop Boys	Progress Live	152,024 / 152,024	
23 June 2011	Take That	Pet Shop Boys	Progress Live	152,024 / 152,024	
24 June 2011	Take That	Pet Shop Boys	Progress Live	152,024 / 152,024	
2 July 2011	Neil Diamond		World Tour 2011		
18 June 2013	Bruce Springsteen and the E Street Band		Wrecking Ball World Tour	44,000 / 46,988	
25 June 2013	Robbie Williams	Olly Murs	Take the Crown Stadium Tour		
26 June 2013	Robbie Williams	Olly Murs	Take the Crown Stadium Tour		
3 July 2013	Bon Jovi	We Were Promised Jetpacks	Because We Can	34,733 / 34,733	
28 June 2015	AC/DC	Vintage Trouble	Rock or Bust World Tour	50,335 / 50,335	
1 June 2016	Bruce Springsteen and the E Street Band		The River Tour (2016)	45,330 / 45,330	
7 June 2016	Coldplay	Alessia Cara, Lianne La Havas	A Head Full of Dreams Tour	48,526 / 48,526	
27 June 2016	Rihanna	Big Sean, Alan Walker	Anti World Tour		
7 July 2016	Beyoncé	Chloe x Halle, Ingrid	The Formation World Tour	46,058 / 46,058	
24 June 2017	The Stone Roses	Primal Scream, Steve Mason			
1 June 2018	Ed Sheeran	Anne-Marie, Jamie Lawson	÷ Tour	152,024 / 152,024	
2 June 2018	Ed Sheeran	Anne-Marie, Jamie Lawson	÷ Tour	152,024 / 152,024	
3 June 2018	Ed Sheeran	Anne-Marie, Jamie Lawson	÷ Tour	152,024 / 152,024	
9 June 2018	Beyoncé & Jay-Z	Nasty P	On the Run II Tour	37,963 / 37,963	
22 June 2019	P!nk	Vance Joy, Bang Bang Romeo, KidCutUp	Beautiful Trauma World Tour	102,273 / 102,273	
23 June 2019	P!nk	Vance Joy, Bang Bang Romeo, KidCutUp	Beautiful Trauma World Tour	102,273 / 102,273	
16 June 2022	Ed Sheeran	DYLAN, Maisie Peters	+–=÷x Tour		
17 June 2022	Ed Sheeran	DYLAN, Maisie Peters	+–=÷x Tour		
26 June 2022	Liam Gallagher	Kasabian, Goat Girl	C’mon You Know Tour		
2 July 2022	Calvin Harris	MK, Disciples, Arielle Free		52,000	
16 July 2022	Gerry Cinnamon	The Charlatans, Jake Bugg, The Snuts		50,000/ 50,000	
17 July 2022	Gerry Cinnamon	Travis, Jake Bugg, Vistas		50,000/ 50,000	
23 August 2022	Coldplay	H.E.R., Nina Nesbitt	Music of the Spheres World Tour	106,209 / 106,209	
24 August 2022	Coldplay	London Grammar, Nina Nesbitt	Music of the Spheres World Tour	106,209 / 106,209	
23 July 2023	Red Hot Chili Peppers	The Roots; King Princess	Global Stadium Tour		
17 June 2024	Foo Fighters	Courtney Barnett; Honeyblood	Everything or Nothing at All Tour		
28 June 2024	Pink	Gayle; KidCutUp; The Script	Pink Summer Carnival		
29 June 2024	Pink	Gayle; KidCutUp; The Script	Pink Summer Carnival		
26 June 2025	Lana Del Rey	Banks	Lana Del Rey's 2023–2025 tour		
1 July 2025	Chris Brown	Bryson Tiller	Breezy Bowl XX	36,923 / 36,923	
8 July 2025	Kendrick Lamar; SZA	Mustard	Grand National Tour	43,686	
12 June 2026	Take That	The Script; Belinda Carlisle	The Circus Live – Summer 2026		
13 June 2026	Take That	The Script; Belinda Carlisle	The Circus Live – Summer 2026		
25 June 2026	Metallica	Gojira; Knocked Loose	M72 World Tour		

== Records ==
The highest attendance recorded at Hampden for a football match was 149,415, for a 1937 British Home Championship tie between Scotland and England. This is still a European record for an international match. The 1937 Scottish Cup Final between Celtic and Aberdeen drew an official crowd of 147,365, a world record for a club match, with 20,000 more people locked outside. Hampden set world attendance records that year which have only been surpassed by the Maracanã, and it still holds all the major European records. The European Cup match between Celtic and Leeds United in 1970 was attended by 136,505, which is a UEFA competition record.

Since the redevelopment of Hampden was completed in 1999, the capacity for sporting events is now limited to 51,866. Attendances for concerts can be higher than this as people are allowed onto the pitch area. In 2009, more people attended concerts at Hampden than football matches. While Queen's Park played at the ground, Hampden regularly had crowds of below 1,000 for their matches in the lower divisions of the Scottish football league system.

== Transport ==
The nearest railway stations are Mount Florida and King's Park. Both stations are served by trains from Glasgow Central on the Cathcart Circle Lines. First Glasgow operate several bus routes in the area surrounding Hampden. There is a stadium car park immediately behind the south stand, but for major events this is only available to permit holders.

== See also ==
- Stadium relocations in Scottish football
- European club finals held at Hampden

Preceded by Neckarstadion; Stuttgart	European Cup; Final venue 1960	Succeeded by Wankdorf Stadium; Bern
Preceded by Two-legged final	European Cup Winners' Cup; Final venue 1962	Succeeded by De Kuip; Rotterdam
Preceded by Wembley Stadium; London	European Cup Winners' Cup; Final venue 1966	Succeeded by Städtisches Stadion; Nuremberg
Preceded by Parc des Princes; Paris	European Cup; Final venue 1976	Succeeded by Stadio Olimpico; Rome
Preceded by San Siro; Milan	UEFA Champions League; Final venue 2002	Succeeded by Old Trafford; Manchester
Preceded by Philips Stadion; Eindhoven	UEFA Cup; Final venue 2007	Succeeded by City of Manchester Stadium; Manchester
